= List of Australian comics creators =

This is a list of Australian comics creators. Although comics have different formats, this list covers creators of editorial cartoons, comic books, graphic novels, and comic strips, along with early innovators. The list presents authors with Australia as their country of origin, although they may have published or now be resident in other countries. For other countries, see List of comic creators.

== Editorial cartoonists ==
Australian professional cartoonists work for commercially published newspapers and journals, as well as in Australian comics, children's illustration, and animation. Many of these artists have their work collected and published as books.

- Dean Alston
- Michael Atchison
- David Blumenstein
- Jason Chatfield
- Patrick Cook
- Stan Cross
- John Ditchburn
- William Ellis Green
- Robert Hannaford
- Geoff "Jeff" Hook
- Eleri Mai Harris
- Jessica Harwood
- Judy Horacek
- Arthur Horner
- Mark Knight
- Sean Leahy
- Bill Leak
- Mary Leunig
- Michael Leunig
- Andrew Marlton
- Neil Matterson
- Stewart McCrae
- George Molnar
- Alan Moir
- Dillon Naylor
- Peter Nicholson
- Pat Oliphant
- Ward O'Neill
- Bruce Petty
- Geoff Pryor
- Paul Rigby
- Victoria Roberts
- D.H. Souter
- John Spooner
- Ron Tandberg
- Andrew Weldon
- Cathy Wilcox

== Comic book and comic strip creators ==
Australian comic book and strip artists and writers:

=== A ===
- Hart Amos – (The Lost Patrol, Devil Doone, Kidnap Cavern, Hurricane Hardy, Air Hawk and the Flying Doctors)
- Rachel Ang - (I Ate The Whole World To Find You)
- Patrick Alexander – (Pink Chickens, Raymondo Person, The Wraith).

=== B ===
- Marcelo Baez – (Diabla)
- Jimmy Bancks – (Ginger Meggs)
- Fil Barlow – (Inkspots, Zooniverse)
- Scott Beattie – (The Seven Swords)
- Paul Bedford – (The LisT)
- Phil Belbin – (Peril on Venus, Climax Comics, The Raven, The Early Birds)
- Andrez Bergen – (Tales to Admonish, Magpie, Bullet Gal, Trista & Holt, Tobacco-Stained Mountain Goat)
- Moira Bertram – (Jo, Flameman)
- David Blumenstein – (Nakedfella Comics, Herman, The Legal Labrador, #takedown)
- Paul Bradford – (Astral Crusaders, Witch Hunters, Undercurrent, Silent but Deadly)
- Maurice Bramley – (The Phantom Commando, The Fast Gun)

=== C ===
- Bernard Caleo – (Tango, The False Impressionists)
- Eddie Campbell – (Bacchus, From Hell)
- Gerald Carr – (Vampire!, Vixen, The Dirty Digger)
- Gary Chaloner – (Jackaroo, Red Kelso, Will Eisner's John Law)
- W. Chew 'Chewie' Chan – (Iron Man, Buckaroo Banzai and Cthulhu Tales)
- Queenie Chan – (The Dreaming)
- Peter Chapman – (The Phantom Ranger, Sir Falcon, The Shadow)
- Jason Chatfield – (continued Ginger Meggs since 2007)
- Keith Chatto – (Destiny Scott, The Lone Wolf, Air Hawk and the Flying Doctors, The Phantom)
- Con Chrisoulis – (Clans, Rebel Rebel: The Graphic Biography of David Bowie, Tales of The Smiths)
- R.B. Clark – (Boofhead)
- Darren Close – (Killeroo)
- Noel Cook – (Kokey Koala)
- Trudy Cooper – (Oglaf, artist, co-creator and co-writer of Platinum Grit)
- Stan Cross – (The Potts & Wally and the Major)

=== D ===
- Wynne W. Davies – (Percy the Pommy)
- David de Vries – (Cyclone!, Dark Horse Down Under, The Phantom)
- John Dixon – (The Crimson Comet, Air Hawk and the Flying Doctors, Captain Strato)
- Les Dixon – (Bluey and Curley, Phill Dill)
- Michal Dutkiewicz – (Batman Forever, Lost in Space)
- Will Dyson – (early political cartoonist)

=== E ===
- Tony Edwards – (Captain Goodvibes)
- Sarah Ellerton – (Inverloch)
- Anton Emdin – (Cruel World)
- Ken Emerson – (Bush Folks, The Warrumbunglers)
- Hal English – (Red Steele, Cobra Woman)

=== F ===
- Jules Faber – (Sporadic, Golgotha)
- George Finey – (early cartoonist)
- Sarah Firth – (Eventually Everything Connects)
- Roger Fletcher – (Torkan)
- Adam Ford – (Jutchy ya ya, Man bites Dog, The Book of Job, The Amazing Atavistic Adventures of the Fish, Neuronn: the Creature from a Human Brain)
- Hayden Fryer – (Cobber, Darkest Night, Nothing Serious, Full Moon, Billy: Demon Slayer)

=== G ===
- May Gibbs – (Bib and Bub)
- Nicki Greenberg – (The Great Gatsby: a graphic adaptation, Tango)
- Alex Gurney – (Stiffy and Mo, Bluey and Curley)

=== H ===
- George Hall – (Reverie)
- Peta Hewitt – (Terinu)
- Yaroslav Horak – (Chandor, Brenda Starr, James Bond, The Mask, Jet Fury)
- Marie "Mollie" Horseman – (Pam)
- Sarah Howell – (Squishface Studio)
- Simon Hanselmann (aka Simon James) – (Shucka shucka, Girl mountain, Horse Mania / Poofter Basher (split cassingle), Megg and Mogg)

=== J ===
- Scott Johnson – (Hip Pocket)
- Eric Jolliffe – (Andy, Saltbush Bill, Witchetty's Tribe)
- Garth Jones – (Killeroo: Road Rage)
- Phil Judd – (Pet Therapy)

=== K ===
- Shaun Keenan - (Fractured Shards, Xtreme Champion Tournament, Terralympus, Sisters of Blood, Knight, Talos of Sparta)
- James Kemsley – (writer/artist of Ginger Meggs, 1948–2007)

=== L ===
- Lee Lai – (Stone Fruit, Cannon)
- Daniel Lawson – (Azerath, Contractually Obligated, Killeroo:Scars, Colt)
- Len Lawson – (The Lone Avenger)
- Percy Leason - (political cartoonist)
- Peter Ledger – (Carlos McLlyr, Sisterhood of Steel)
- Glenn Lumsden – (Cyclone!, The Phantom)
- Carl Lyon - (Black McDermitt, Wally and the Major)

=== M ===
- Paul Mason – (The Phantom, Kid Phantom (Frew Publications), The Eldritch Kid: Bone War (Gestalt Comics), The Soldier Legacy (Black House Comics))
- Arthur Mather – (Captain Atom, Sergeant Pat, Secret Agent X9, Flynn of the FBI)
- Shane McCarthy – (Detective Comics, Transformers)
- Stewart McKenny – (The Watch)
- Norman McMurray - (Fish and Chips, Googles)
- Emile Mercier – (Supa Dupa Man, Wocko the Beaut, Doc McSwiggle, Search for the Gnu-Gnah)
- Syd Miller – (Chesty Bond, Aminalaughs, Us Girls, Rod Craig)
- Joan Morrison - (Morrison Girls)

=== N ===
- Dillon Naylor – (Da 'n Dill, Batrisha, A Brush With Darkness)
- Tony Newton – (Foolproof Comics)
- Wayne Nichols – (The X-Files, Orphan Black, Incredible Hulk: Giant-Size, Exiles, Star Wars: The Force Unleashed.)
- Syd Nicholls – (Fatty Finn, Middy Malone)

=== O ===
- Kathleen O'Brien – (Wanda (Wanda the War Girl))
- Gavin L. O'Keefe – (Phantastique, Jonny Flathead)
- Pat Oliphant – (political cartoonist)
- Mandy Ord – (Brick Dog, Sensitive Creatures, Dirty Little Creep, Ordinary Eyeball)

=== P ===
- Jason Paulos - (Hairbutt the Hippo, Eeek!)
- Maria Pena – (Fox Comics, Passionate Nomads)
- Craig Phillips – (Finch!)
- Tad Pietrzykowski - (Cyclone!, Dark Nebula, Golden Age Southern Cross)
- Lloyd Piper – (Wolf, Ginger Meggs)
- Reginald Pitt - (Silver Starr, Yarmak - The Jungle King)
- Stanley Pitt – (Anthony Fury, Silver Starr, Captain Power, Yarmak - Jungle King)

=== R ===
- Dean Rankine – (Holy Cow! Christian Comics, Grossgirl and Boogerboy)
- Virgil Reilly – (Silver Flash, Invisible Avenger)
- Norm Rice – (Powerman, Steele Carewe, Rice and Shine, Bluey and Curley)
- Madeleine Rosca – (Hollow Fields manga)
- Dan Russell – (Darky, the Kid from the Snowy River)
- Jim Russell – (The Potts)

=== S ===
- Allan Salisbury - (Snake Tales)
- Nicola Scott – (Birds of Prey (DC Comics), Star Wars titles (Dark Horse), Angel titles (IDW Publishing), Dead Year High (Penguin Books), Season of the Witch (Image Comics), Halloween Man)
- Christopher Sequeira – (Iron Man (in Marvel Comics' 'Astonishing Tales'), Justice League Adventures (DC Comics), 9/11: Artists Respond Vol. II (DC Comics), Cthulhu Tales (Boom! Studios), Dark Detective: Sherlock Holmes (Black House Comics), Pulse of Darkness, Rattlebone: The Pulp-Faced Detective, Mister Blood, Deadlock & Doc Morton, Bold Action, The Borderlander, Jonny Flathead: Agent of MONSTA. Editor Tides of Hope (Supernova Pop Culture Expo, 2011)-
- Mark Sexton – (Bug & Stump)
- Lee Sheppard – (Cactus Island)
- Lee Slattery – (Bacchus, Dee Vee, Everybody Loves The Lizardman)
- Jozef Szekeres – (Elfquest WaveDancers (original series), Safety-Belt Man, Dart, Dawn, Oblagon, Underwater Love.)

=== T ===
- Shaun Tan – (The Lost Thing, The Arrival)
- Tom Taylor – (Injustice: Gods Among Us (DC Comics), The Deep: Here Be Dragons (Gestalt Publishing), Star Wars: Invasion (Dark Horse Comics), Earth-Two (DC Comics))
- Ben Templesmith – (30 Days of Night, Star Wars Comics)
- Ian C. Thomas – (Moth & Tanuki (in OzTAKU and Mania), Ratty Things (Mania), The Ink, Xuan Xuan, Maelstrom (also in Reverie), Busker Jim (City Extra))
- Andie Tong – (Spectacular Spider-Man UK, The Batman Strikes! and Tangent: Superman's Reign, Tron: Betrayal.)

=== V ===
- Sheldon Vella
- Ron Vivian – (continued Ginger Meggs)

=== W ===
- Monty Wedd – (Foreign Legion, Bert and Ned, Captain Justice, The Scorpion, Kent Blake and King Comet, Space Rangers)
- Paul Wheelahan – (The Raven, The Panther)
- Cecil 'Unk' White – (The Adventures of Blue Hardy, Freckles)
- Colin Wilson – (Strips, 2000AD, La Jeunesse de Blueberry, Dans L'Ombre du Soleil, Point Blank)
- Ashley Wood – (Cyclone Comics Quarterly, Dark Horse Down Under, Popbot)
- Paul Woods - (Insert Brain Here)

== See also ==
- Comics in Australia
