= Comics in Australia =

Australian comics
- Earliest publications: 1908
- Languages: Australian English

Australian comics have been published since 1908 and Australian comics creators have gone to produce influential work in the global comics industry (especially in American comics).

== History ==
=== 1900s ===
Vumps, the first Australian comic equivalent to British boy's papers, such as Boy's Own, Chum and The Gem was published in September 1908. It featured illustrations, with the text printed below and lasted only one issue.

=== 1910s ===
On 7 October 1911 coloured comics appeared in The Comic Australian, a weekly publication containing jokes and poetry, which continued for 87 issues until June 1913. In 1916 a small format children's paper, The Golden Age commenced. It featured three pages of strips and cartoons, including Algy & Kitty by B. Ericsson. The publication ceased in 1917.

=== 1920s ===
On 7 August 1920 the first continuing Australian comic strip, You & Me, drawn by Stan Cross, appeared in Smith's Weekly. In August 1925 the Sydney Sunday Times comic supplement was issued. It featured strips including The Two Rogues, by L. de Konigh; Fish & Chips by Norman McMurray and The Strange Adventures of Percy the Pom by Wynne Davies. The 13 November 1921 saw the first issue of Us Fellas, by Jimmy Bancks, in the Sunbeams Page of the Sunday Sun, this comic strip introduced the character of Ginger Meggs, the longest running Australian comic strip. The first Sunbeams (Ginger Meggs) Annual appeared in 1924, and continued to appear each Christmas for the next 35 years.

A number of other children's papers, such as Pals, The Boy's Weekly and Cobbers, were released during this period. All contained a few strips but were mainly text and articles.

The Society of Australian Black and White Artists was formed in Sydney in 1924, and still exists today as the Australian Cartoonists Association.

=== 1930s ===
Following the demise of Pals the Australian comic book market was dominated by British comic papers until late 1931 with the launch of the first Australian comic book, The Kookaburra. The Kookaburra featured characters such as Bloodthirsty Ben and Callous Claude; The Mulga Merrymakers, Perky Pete the Prospector; and Lucy Lubra the Artful Abo! On 20 May 1934 another Australian comic was published Fatty Finn's Weekly, featuring Fatty Finn by Syd Nicholls. The rest of the comic only featured Australian artists with other strips such as Basso the Bear and Pam and Pospsy Penguin by Hotpoint and Ossie by George Little. While there was text below each frame, the panels contained word balloons.

In the late 1930s the market began to be saturated by the release of reprints of US strips popularised by the women's magazines, The New Idea (Buck Rogers, Boy's Adventure World, Felix the Cat, Hurricane Hawk) and The Woman's Mirror (The Phantom). At the same time another US reprint genre, the tabloid format reprints of Sunday pages and supplements, printed overseas at minimal cost, emerged onto the market. Publications included International Comics, Colour Comics and Wags featuring Buck Rogers, Tarzan, Dick Tracy and early works by Will Eisner.

By 1939 there were political protests about the dumping of overseas magazines and comics in Australia, on behalf of the local industry.

=== 1940s ===
With the onset of World War II the Australian Government placed a ban on the importation of American comics and syndicated proofs. As a result, the local comic book industry flourished. Following the war, Australia incurred a huge national debt: local publishers found they had a captive market as import restrictions continued to be enforced, at the same time the modern American style comic book (mostly sans color) was adopted. In its Golden Age Australian talent produced exciting creations such as Yarmak, Captain Atom, Tim Valour, Crimson Comet, The Panther, The Raven, The Lone Wolf, The Phantom Ranger and many others. September 1948 saw the debut of The Phantom by Frew Publications, the longest continuously published comic book.

=== 1950s ===
This was a decade of recession for the Australian comic market, with production costs rising the prices of local comics rose. Comics faced increased public scrutiny, with censorship of comics beginning in 1954, competition from television (1956) and the re-introduction of American comic imports (1959).

=== 1960s ===
The 1960s saw the demise of the few locally produced titles that had managed to survive the recession in comic book publishing in the previous decade. Sales of reprints such as The Phantom and the Walt Disney titles continued to strengthen, with readers beginning to focus on new American imports, particularly the burgeoning Marvel Comics line.

=== 1970s ===
In the 1970s there was a resurgence in local comic activity, drawing inspiration from the explicit and politicised American underground comic scene, although mainly associated with radical journals such as Revolution, High Times and Nation Review. Few comic books were published with the exception of Cobber Comics in 1971 and Strange Tales (which featured Captain Goodvibes, the work of Tony Edwards) in 1974. Gerald Carr revived the Australian adventure style comic book also in 1974 with the best selling Vampire!, coinciding with the horror comic boom of the times, followed by Brainmaster and Vixen (1977) and Fire Fang (1982). Vixen became Australia's first comic book superheroine.

=== 1980s ===
Since the 1980s there have been fewer local reprints and more direct importing of foreign comics. On the local front new material started with the release of Tad Pietrzykowski's graphic novel The Dynamic Dark Nebula in 1982. Oz Comics in 1983 which debuted The Southern Squadron and the popular Reverie anthology comic lasting seven issues that was distributed nationally..

Later in the mid-1980s many more anthology comic titles appeared, forming the basis for the modern Australian self-publishing community. Three notable ones were Fox Comics, which began in Melbourne in 1985 and lasted for five years and 26 issues. Phantastique from Sydney in 1986 lasted only four issues, as it was in the style of Underground comix but with mainstream distribution – it generated national publicity from opponents Fred Nile and John Laws. (Contributors included Christopher Seqiera and Leigh Blackmore). Cyclone! also from Sydney in 1985 was a more traditional superhero comic with an Australian flavour, it ran for eight issues as an anthology and then another five as Southern Squadron focusing on its most popular feature (plus other spin offs including The Jackaroo and The Dark Nebula as well as a 1990s revival – over thirty related comics were published in the series).

=== 1990s ===
During the 1990s, Australian creators continued to place their work in Australian newsagents via distributors such as Gordon & Gotch, to diminishing success. Popular Australian comic books of the era include Dillon Naylor's Da 'n Dill (1993), Hairbutt the Hippo (1989), Platinum Grit (1993) and Dee Vee (1997).

The 1990s also saw an explosion of comics in zine form due to easy availability of photocopiers and cheap postage. Many artists who began by self-publishing photocopied black-and-white comics at this time have continued on to become popular illustrators and graphic novelists, including Mandy Ord, Ben Hutchings, Anton Emdin and Jules Faber.

Australian artists/writers also began to regularly produce work for overseas comics companies, a development made easier by the internet, as a tool for both scouting talent and sending deliverables quickly (which was previously only possible by use of fax machines). These include Wayne Nichols, Nicola Scott, Ben Templesmith, Tom Taylor, Michal Dutkiewicz, Jozef Szekeres, Marcus Moore, Julie Ditrich, and Doug Holgate.

=== 2000s ===
In the 2000s, a significant market for Australian comic creators was commercial Australian children's magazines. Dillon Naylor led the way with Da 'N' Dill and the popular Batrisha the Vampire Girl in K Zone. Other artists with regular work in these markets included Patrick Alexander, Jase Harper, Rich Warwick, Dean Rankine, Damien Woods and Ian C. Thomas.

In 2007 Julie Ditrich and Jozef Szekeres launched the Comics and Graphic Novel Portfolio for and with the Australian Society of Authors, which focuses on interests and needs for the comic and graphic novelist, both writers and artists, covering topics such as standardized contracts approved by the ASA for both creator owned comics/GNs and work-for-hire.

=== 2010s ===
In the 2010s, online comics and graphic novels became another form in which Australian comics creators made their presence felt overseas, Nicki Greenberg, Mandy Ord, Pat Grant, Simon Hanselmann, Ariel Ries, Shaun Keenan, Stephen Kok, Dan Feuerriegel and Gavin Aung Than being examples of this.

More permanent venues, retailers and galleries devoted to independent comics work also began to appear, including Squishface Studio, Silent Army Storeroom and Santa Clara in Melbourne, and Junky Comics in Brisbane.

== Australian comic book publishers ==
=== Reprint publishers ===
From the 1940s through the 1970s, many local reprints and translations of American – as well as British, European, and South American – comics were published in Australia. Since the 1980s there have been fewer local reprints and more direct importing of foreign comics.

- Atlas Publications (1948 – c. 1958) — newspaper strip reprints as well as American comics from such publishers as American Comics Group (ACG). Published original Australian comics such as Captain Atom (not to be confused with the Charlton/DC character), a full-color comic by Australians Arthur Mather and Jack Bellew (as John Welles).
- Ayers & James (1940s – 1970s) — known for Classics Illustrated reprints, although they published thousands of other comics, including Disney and other funny animal comics, and Westerns.
- Federal Publishing Company a.k.a. Federal Comics and Australian Edition DC (1983–1986) — reprinted contemporary DC, Marvel (taking over the license from Yaffa), Charlton, and Hanna-Barbera comics, occasionally dipping into a backlist of stories acquired from K.G. Murray.
- Frew Publications (1948–present) — Lee Falk's The Phantom reprints
- Gredown (c. 1975 – 1984) — published diverse range of magazine-size reprint comics, predominantly horror (from Eerie magazine) but also Western, science fiction, and other genres.
- Horwitz Publications (c. 1950 – c. 1966) — predominantly published American war, Western, and crime reprints, mainly from Timely/Atlas/Marvel. In the late 1950s, published some original Australian comics, notably adaptations of its Carter Brown novels, but also The Phantom Commando, created by John Dixon, but mostly worked on by Maurice Bramley, who drew it until 1956.
- K.G. Murray Publishing Company a.k.a. Murray Publishers Pty Ltd (1947–1983) — Australia's dominant comics publisher for forty years, reprinted DC Comics titles via imprints which included Colour Comics, Planet Comics, and Murray Comics. Started out publishing original Australian material, including Moira Bertram's Flameman, Albert De Vine's High Compression, and Hart Amos The Lost Patrol.
- Larry Cleland a.k.a. Cleland (1946 – c. 1957) — owned by Vee Publishing Co. Mainly Fawcett Comics reprints, then Charlton Comics, after Fawcett's 1953 demise. In 1954, published what was probably Australia's first adult comic, the controversial, short-lived Steven Carlisle, by Keith Chatto.
- Cleveland Publishing (1953–2020) a publishing company, run John Patrick ‘Jack’ Atkins. It predominately published digest paperback fiction. In October 1950 Cleveland Press (Cleveland Publishing) issued their first comic, The Twilight Ranger, written by Michael Noonan and illustrated by Keith Chatto. In 1956 they introduced their trademark 100-page comic, King Sized Comics, using reprint material, which included Frank Frazetta's Johnny Comet and Rick Yager's Buck Rogers. The comic was regularly issued until late 1959. Cleveland Press also issued a pocketbook sized series of western, romance and war comics, Silhouette. They were one of the last major Australian publishers to print original Australian comics.
- Newton Comics (1975–1976) — published Marvel Comics reprints, part of Maxwell Newton's eccentric short-lived publishing empire based around the tabloid the Melbourne Sunday Observer.
- Otter Press (1998–present) — contemporary publisher of Simpsons Comics reprints, as well as selected children's and humor titles
- Yaffa Publishing Group (1960s – c. 1983) — reprint collections of American newspaper strips and comics (including those originally published by Archie Comics, Charlton Comics, and Skywald), as well as Australian comics originally created for other publishers (such as John Dixon's Catman). Many 1960s Yaffa comics featured original covers and occasional interior art by Australian artist Keith Chatto. By the late 1960s, was republishing duplicate reprints of the defunct Horwitz Publications comics. Through its Page Publications imprint, published Marvel Comics reprints.

=== Publishers of original content ===
In the 1940s, following the banning of the importation of American comics, a number of Australian publishing companies were formed producing comic books, using local comic book artists. Most of which disappeared in the 1950s as a result of import bans being lifted, a censorship campaign, and the introduction of television. The predominant publishing companies during this time included:

- Fitchett Bros. Pty Ltd, established in 1936 in Melbourne, after the end of the Second World War the company was acquired by Southdown Press.
- Frank Johnson Publications, established in 1941 in Sydney by Frank Johnson and closing in 1950
- Hoffmann, established in 1943 in Adelaide by Henry Edward Hoffman and closing in 1949
- Offset Printing Company (OPC), established in New South Wales.
- NSW Bookstall Company Pty Ltd, established in 1940

Since the late 1970s, the comic scene in Australia has been largely driven by self-publishers who created, printed and distributed their own books, with a few publishers who were willing to publish the work of others gradually emerging. Of these, some companies, such as Phosphorescent Comics and Gestalt Publishing, managed to become professional publishers of Australian comics and graphic novels.

- Black House Comics
- Blackglass Press
- Blood & Thunder Publishing Concern
- Cardigan Comics — imprint of cartoonist Bernard Caleo, publishes Tango
- COMICS2MOVIES — Australia's premier award-winning comic and graphic novel publisher
- Dee Vee Press — publisher of anthology and one-shots, featuring creators such as Eddie Campbell, Marcus Moore, Gary Chaloner, Mandy Ord, and Daren White
- Flying Tiger Comics
- Generation – published Generation annual manga anthology
- FrankenComics – imprint of comic creator Frank Candiloro, published over 30 comics since 2010.
- Gestalt Publishing — Australia's largest independent graphic novel publishing house
- Giramondo Publishing — Co-publisher (with Top Shelf) of Pat Grant's Blue graphic novel
- Kiseki – publisher of bimonthly manga anthology
- Milk Shadow Books – publisher of underground comics, art and writing
- Ozone — Killeroo and Darren Close
- Oztaku – manga artist collective, former publisher
- Phosphorescent Comics — Published The Watch, Dunwich, and other titles. Active in the mid-2000s.
- Reverie Publications – publisher of anthology, firstly in 1985 and then re-established in 2018.
- Sequence Comics – Edited and largely written by Christopher Sequeira included such titles as The Borderlander co-written by Steve Proposch and illustrated by W Chew Chan and Mr Blood illustrated by Jan Scherpenhuizen
- STaB Comics
- Storm Publishing

Since 2002 international publishers have increasingly begun to publish graphic novels by Australian comic creators, beginning with The Five Mile Press (Dillon Naylor) and Slave Labor Graphics (J. Marc Schmidt, Jason Franks) and, more recently, Allen & Unwin (Nicki Greenberg, Mandy Ord, Bruce Mutard), Scholastic (Shaun Tan), TokyoPop (Queenie Chan, Madeleine Rosca), Seven Seas Entertainment (Sarah Ellerton), and Finlay Lloyd (Mandy Ord).

== Awards ==
- From 1984 to present, The Stanley Awards (run by the Australian Cartoonists' Association) had a separate category for Adventure /Illustrated Strip Artist (between 1984 and 1999). This award was subsequently merged with the Comic Strip Cartoonist Award until 2010, when the category was reinstated as Comic Book Artist Award.
- The OzCon Awards were also an important recognition of Australian comic creators from their inception in 1991, until the OzCons ceased.
- The Kanga Awards were a much sought after recognition of Home-grown Australia Self-Publishing in the mid to late nineties.
- The Ledger Awards, created in 2004 by Gary Chaloner in honour of famed Australian artist Peter Ledger, to recognize excellence in Australian comic art and publishing, ran until 2007. This was reborn from 2013 and retrospective awards were given for the years missed.

== Conventions ==
The first true Australian Comic Convention was Comicon I (June 1979) held at RMIT in Melbourne. Comicon II (June 14–16, 1980) followed at the Sheraton Hotel in Melbourne, and Comicon III (1981) was held in Sydney.

The Australian Comic-Book Convention was held on 16–18 January 1986 at the Sydney Opera House, featuring international guests for the first time, including Jim Steranko and Will Eisner, who allowed the Spirit to be depicted as a koala while Spider-Man was a kangaroo. The convention was organised by three principles – Peter Mitris, Richard Rae, and former Federal Publishing licensing consultant Peter Greenwood (who is now based in Los Angeles as a worldwide licensing manager for classic television). They had hoped to turn it into an annual event based on San Diego Comic-Con, but a lack of corporate sponsorship for such a large event caused it to be a one-off.

It was the forerunner of the many later OzCon conventions, held from 1992 to 1998 in Sydney, with an additional event in Melbourne in 1997, and the comicfest! events, again in Sydney from 2000 to 2002.

Supanova Expo is Australia's largest con. It has been held in Sydney and Brisbane each year since 2002 and 2003 respectively and growing to include Perth and Melbourne since 2008. It features, in addition to comic books, a mix of current TV pop cultures, from science fiction and fantasy to anime and manga. It features special guest comic book writers and artists and actors from currently in-vogue series, movies and anime, as well as special effects creators.

== Collections ==
National Library of Australia

- www.wnichols.com, 2005 – Site contains updates relating to comic book artist Wayne Nichols' work, galleries and a bio.
- Australian Comics Collection, 1930s–1950s (51 boxes, ~550 issues), includes items formerly in the collections of Mick Stone and Graham McGee.
- John Ryan collection of Australian comic books, ca. 1940–1960 (9.25 m. / 66 boxes + 2 fol. Items)
- McGee collection of Australian comic books, ca. 1940–1960 (312 boxes + 5 fol. Items)
- Archie Comics, 1987–1993 (25 boxes)
- Michael Hill Collection of Australian Comics, 1990–2000 (435 items)
- Nick Henderson Zine Collection, 1980–2010, ca. 2000 vols., including many comic zines
- Nick Henderson Comic Collection, 1960s–1990s, ca. 350 items, includes Australian and Australian reprints of American comics
- Geoff Pryor collection of cartoons and drawings, 1978– (ca. 7290 drawings)
- George Molnar collection, 1955–1991 (ca. 2472 drawings)
- Alan Moir collection of cartoons and drawings, 1972–2009 (2008 drawings)
- Ward O'Neill collection, 1987–2007 (716 drawings)
- Stan Cross Archive of cartoons and drawings, 1912–1974 (4937 drawings + 71 photographs)
- Judy Horacek collection of cartoons, 1996–2006 (80 drawings)
- Matilda collection, 1981–1993 (ca. 270 cartoons, ca. 500 photographs, 2 sculptures, ca. 2 posters)
- Stewart McCrae cartoon collection, ca. 1963–1980 (648 drawings)
- Cartoons by WEG, 1970–1990 (104 drawings)
- John Spooner cartoon collection, 1989–2008 (58 drawings)
- Arthur Horner Collection of political cartoons, (211 drawings)
- Percy Deane Collection, ca. 1910–1930 (68 pen and ink drawings) caricatures of Australian politicians published in The Bulletin, by cartoonists such as Sir David Low, Livingston Hopkins, Tom Glover and Dennis Connelly.
- Comic artists and illustrators oral history project, 1995–, (8 digital audio tapes) interviewer, Ros Bowden
- Papers of Nan Fullarton, circa 1940-circa 1969 (4.7 m, 6 boxes). Papers of Nan Fullarton, author, illustrator, comic strip artist and ballet costume designer.
- Papers of Stan Cross, 1880s–1980s (0.56 m, 4 boxes)

State Library of New South Wales

- The Andrew M. Potts Australian independent comic book and fanzine collection, 1989–2003 (3 boxes, 172 items)
- Collection of Australian reprints of American and English comics, 1940–1967 (58 boxes)
- Bulletin drawings, 1886–1960 (18,070 drawings), artists include Norman Lindsay, Sir David Low, George Lambert, Geoffrey Townshend, and Unk White.
- Australian Black and White Artists' Club Collection of cartoons and caricature drawings, 1920s; 1943–1991 (approximately 4,000 drawings, watercolour sketches, duotone prints, bromide negatives and bromide prints)
- Cartoons and caricatures of current events and public figures by Livingston Hopkins and Austin O. Spare, ca. 1893–1909 (117 drawings and 1 reproduction on 21 sheets)
- Caricatures and cartoons by Bill Leak, ca. 1987–1991 (100 drawings)

State Library of Victoria

- Kevin Patrick Collection of Australian Comics, 1970–2005 (~170 titles)
- Sarah Howell Collection of Australian comics (~152 titles)

== See also ==
- List of Australian comics creators

== Sources ==
- Burrows, Toby and Stone, Grant (eds.). "Comics in Australia and New Zealand: the collections, the collectors, the creators". New York; Norwood [S. Aust.]: Haworth Press, c1994. ISBN 1-56024-664-2
- Crook, Edgar. 'Comic capers in the National Library', in "NLA News", January 2005, Volume XV Number 4. Canberra: National Library of Australia, 2005.
- Harker, Margot 'Cultural pariahs : The National Library of Australia's collection of Australian romance comics', in ‘’The National Library Magazine’’, March 2009
- Harker, Margot ‘Preaching purity’, in ‘’The National Library Magazine’’, June 2009
- Nugent, Ann, ‘From Fatty Finn to the Phantom’, ‘’NLA News’’, June 1996, Volume VI, Number 9
- Patrick, Kevin. Heroes & villains: Australian comics and their creators. Melbourne: State Library of Victoria, 2006. ISBN 0-9775064-4-4
- Ryan, John. Panel by Panel: a History of Australian Comics. Stanmore, N.S.W.: Cassell Australia, 1979. ISBN 0-7269-7376-9
- Shiell, Annette (ed.). Bonzer: Australian Comics 1900-1990s. Redhill South, Vic.: Elgua Media, 1998. ISBN 1-876677-00-7 / 1876677066
- Maynard, Amy. "The Melbourne Scene: A Case Study of Comics Production, City Spaces, and The Creative Industries".
