= Squishface Studio =

Co-working space for comic artists and illustrators in Brunswick, Australia

- Status: Active
- Founded: 2011
- Founders: Ben Hutchings; Sarah Howell; David Blumenstein; Marta Tesoro; Arran McKenna; Sacha Bryning
- Country of origin: Australia
- Headquarters location: South Melbourne, Australia
- Key people: Ben Hutchings; Sarah Howell; David Blumenstein; Chris Gooch; Jess Parker; Clea Chiller
- Publication types: Comics
- Fiction genres: Anthology; Humor; autobiographical; nonfiction
- Official website: squishfacestudio.com

Squishface Studio is a co-working space for comic artists and illustrators in South Melbourne, Australia. It was founded in Brunswick, Australia in November 2011 by Ben Hutchings, Sarah Howell, David Blumenstein, Marta Tesoro, Arran McKenna and Sacha Bryning, and formally opened to the public on January 26, 2012. As of 2024, Howell, Blumenstein and Hutchings continue to be resident artists.

Squishface is known as a community hub for comics in Australia; it is the only permanent comics maker space in the country and one of few in the world that is open to the public. It also publishes comics; three editions of the anthology Squishzine Brunstown have been released. The first won a Bronze Ledger award in 2015. It published its first book, Squishbook: Make comics with Squishface Studio and friends, in 2024.

== History ==
In 2011, eight Melbourne comic artists were invited by the National Gallery of Victoria to spend a month in residency at the NGV Studio space at Federation Square. Two were Sarah Howell and Ben Hutchings, who decided, along with four other local comic artists, to establish a permanent space that would function in a similar way.

The original Squishface Studio was located at 309 Victoria St, Brunswick, and was a single room shop front in which eight to twelve artists were typically resident at any given time. It was previously a bridal shop.

Squishface Studio is now located at Studio Hall in South Melbourne, on the grounds of St Kilda Southport Uniting Church. It supports itself financially by memberships and running classes.

== Studio activities ==
The studio's major events are the Squishface Coaster Show (a parody of the Linden Postcard Show), Squishface anniversary events and the monthly drawing night (first Wednesday of each month). At different times the studio has also held Ladies' Drawing Auxiliary, a showcase for the work of non-male comics makers, book launches, children's classes and exhibitions.

Squishface has also been heavily involved in the Homecooked Comics Festival, which was run for several years by Squishface artists Sarah Howell and Clea Chiller and was then passed on to Black Inc publicity and marketing manager Marian Blythe.

In 2023, Squishbook: Make comics with Squishface Studio and friends, "a how-to-make-comics book, and a why-you-should-make-comics book", was crowdfunded, and received support from the City of Melbourne. The book was officially published in 2024. Contributors include David Blumenstein, Alex e Clark, Patrick Alexander, performer Nicholas J. Johnson and screenwriter Warwick Holt.

In 2024 Squishface held the first Emerald Hill Comics Festival at their South Melbourne location.

== Resident artists ==
The following artists have been resident in the studio.

- Ben Hutchings
- Sarah Howell
- David Blumenstein
- Marta Tesoro
- Arran McKenna
- Sacha Bryning
- Jo Waite
- Scarlette Baccini
- Patrick Alexander
- Lily Mae Martin
- Laura Renfrew
- Scott Reid
- Jess Parker
- Teags Humm
- Alexander Trevisan
- Agathe de Gennes
- Jase Harper
- Lucy Fekete
- Haydn Kwan
- Natalie Britten
- Samantha Ee
- Danny Stanley
- Chris Gooch
- Grace Reeves
- Eleri Mai Harris
- Emily Hearn
- Mark Ingram
- Drew Turketo
- Ele Jenkins
- Ive Sorocuk
- Alex Clark
- Jonathan Vyssaritis
- Lauren (Hills) Bedggood
- Rebecca Clements
- Andrea Crisp
- Sophia Parsons Cope
- Clea Chiller
- Simon Howe
- Marlo Mogensen
- Verity Sathasivam
- Simon Wall
- Nicola Mitchell
- Martin Nixon
- Tom Winspear
- Ariel Ries
- Sam Emery
- Sarah Firth
- Issey Fujishima
- Priscilla Ong
- Vicky Nguyen
- Tom Vaughn

== Projects worked on at the studio ==
- Jase Harper's graphic novel Awkwood
- Chris Gooch's graphic novels Bottled
- Ben Hutchings' graphic novels The Invisible War, Mini-Mel and Timid Tom, Avanti! Tutta and Follow Your Gut
- Squishbook: Make comics with Squishface Studio and friends
- Photographer/filmmaker Kasper Voogt created a portrait series of Squishface Studio artists.

== See also ==
- Comics in Australia
- List of Australian comics creators

== Sources ==
- Squishface Studio, About
- Blumenstein, David. "Squishface Studio: A Physical Hub for Comics in Melbourne".
- Caterson, Simon. "Chris Gooch’s debut graphic novel; Monkey Grip for Millennials", Daily Review (Dec 30, 2017).
- Maynard, Amy. "The Melbourne Scene: A Case Study of Comics Production, City Spaces, and The Creative Industries".
- Blumenstein, David. "Stanleys 2013: The Australian Cartoonists Association conference (part 1)" (Oct 29, 2013).
- Squishface Studio, "Squishface Studio's response to Australia Council cuts" (26 June 2015).
