= Inverloch =

Inverloch may refer to:

- Inverloch, Victoria, a seaside town in Victoria, Australia
- Inverloch (webcomic), a webcomic
- Inverloch Castle, the pub Inverloch Arms, and Inverloch, Scotland, fictional places in Les Spectres d'Inverloch
