= Hairbutt the Hippo =

Australian comic book series

Publication information
- Publisher: Rat Race Comix
- First appearance: Hairbutt the Hippo #1
- Created by: Jason Paulos

In-story information
- Species: hippopotamus

Hairbutt the Hippo is an Australian comic book series by Jason Paulos. It was published by Rat Race Comix, that stars an anthropomorphic hippopotamus named Hairbutt, who works as a private detective. Along with Paulos, Bodine Amerikah wrote several Hairbutt the Hippo stories while Paulos illustrated them.

Paulos created his first Hairbutt the Hippo comic in 1991. In 2001 the character's similarities with an American comic book character called Hip Flask, also an anthropomorphic hippopotamus private detective, led Hairbutt co-creator Bodine Amerikah and Darren Close of OzComics to accuse Hip Flask creator Richard Starkings of plagiarism. Starkings replied that he created Hip Flash without any knowledge of Hairbutt, and that their similarities were a bizarre coincidence.
