= Ian C. Thomas =

Ian C. Thomas (born 1963), a.k.a. Ian T., is a long-term Australian comics artist, cartoonist, and musician. He created Australia's first minicomic (in 1978), produced Maelstrom (1982) and contributed to the early Australian anthology Reverie, as well as a comic strip about a busker in Melbourne newspaper City Extra.

Ian T's recent work has appeared widely in Australian comics, including OzTAKU (Moth & Tanuki black-and-white series), The Ink music comic, Xuan Xuan, Pirates, Tango, literary journal Going Down Swinging, and the books Operation Funnybone, and Beginnings (2012). Among other comics, he drew Dillon Naylor's Rock 'N' Roll Fairies for Total Girl magazine (Sept. 2005-Aug. 2006) and a Moth & Tanuki colour series for Mania magazine (Jan.-Summer 2007).

He is a professional member of the Australian Cartoonists' Association .

Ian T is also the musical artist known as Busker's Dog, named after a character in the earlier comic strip. First album "Sea to City" was released in 2022. It features guests including Tom Haran and Peter Lacey, and was mastered by Scott Hull at Masterdisk.
