= Noel Cook =

New Zealand artist (1896–1981)

- Born: Wilfred Noel Uppadine Cook; 1896; Foxton, New Zealand
- Died: 1981 (aged 84–85); London, England
- Occupations: Cartoonist, comics artist, artist

Wilfred Noel Uppadine Cook (1896–1981) was a New Zealand artist, illustrator, cartoonist and comics artist and a pioneer of science fiction comics. He worked in New Zealand, Australia and England.

== Biography ==
Cook was born in Foxton, of English and Māori descent; his great-grandfather was Te Rauparaha. He worked as a commercial artist and drew cartoons in his spare time for the Sydney Bulletin, while working in clerical positions and as an assistant town clerk in Tauranga. During World War 1 he served in France with the 15th Reinforcement and was wounded at Messines. He moved to Australia in the early 1920s. During World War II he served in the Australian Camouflage Unit.

== Career ==
Cook trained under Trevor Lloyd at the Auckland Weekly News and New Zealand Herald, and was cartoonist for the New Zealand Observer. He moved to Australia along with other New Zealand cartoonists George Finey, and Cecil 'Unk' White; there he worked as a freelance illustrator for Smith's Weekly and the Sydney Bulletin. He created a number of comics and comic strips:

- Roving Peter - one of the first sci-fi comic strips depicting space exploration. It was published in the 1920s in The Sunday Times
- Lost in Space
- Planet of Fear
- Adrift in Space
- Cosmic Calamity
- Bobby and Betty - published from 1933 in The Daily Telegraph
- Kokey Koala - a superhero comic published between 1947 and 1955
- Pirate Planet and Peril Planet - sci-fi comics in the 1940s
- The Blue Ray (1946)

He was also known as an Australian cartoonist and artist. During his time in Australia he was art editor at the Daily Telegraph and magazines Bachelor Girl and Australian Women's Weekly.

After moving to England in 1950 he became art editor for Amalgamated Press, the largest publisher of comics in the UK. In later life he turned to painting exhibiting 24 works at New Zealand House in London in 1969, followed by other exhibitions. An exhibition of his comic artwork was held at the Auckland Art Gallery in 1979. He died in London in 1981, survived by his wife Irene and son Peter, named after his comic character.

Cook is notable for creating early science fiction comics. His Māori heritage had less influence on his career than for another Māori cartoonist Harry Dansey.
