= Red Leaves / 紅葉 =

English and Japanese bilingual literary magazine

- Front-cover design for Red Leaves / 紅葉 #002, spoken-word edition
- Editor: Kirk Marshall, Yasuhiro Horiuchi
- Frequency: Annual
- Publisher: A Cowboy Named Molasses Publishing
- Founded: 2010
- Country: Australia / Japan
- Based in: Melbourne / Tokyo
- ISSN: 1836-9073

Red Leaves / 紅葉 is an English-language and Japanese bilingual literary magazine.

== Description ==
Based out of Melbourne, Australia and Tokyo, Japan, Red Leaves / 紅葉 is edited by writers Kirk Marshall and Yasuhiro Horiuchi, and designed by Liberty Browne. The inaugural issue was translated by Sunny Suh, Asami Nishimura and Joo Whan Suh. The journal is produced independently through the small press imprint, A Cowboy Named Molasses Publishing, and was first published and launched in May, 2010, during the 2010 Emerging Writers' Festival in Melbourne. It featured contributions from thirty writers, including Ivy Alvarez, Toby Litt, Nathaniel Rich, Nicholas Hogg, Travis Jeppesen, Eric Dando, Patrick Holland, Jeremy Balius, Mandy Ord, Hirofumi Sugimoto, Daisuke Suzuki, Kenji Siratori, Keiji Minato, Kuniharu Shimizu, Tokihiko Araki and Iris Yamashita. The magazine is released as an anthology annually and showcases short fiction, manga, creative non-fiction and poetry. It is concerned with exhibiting the work of emerging and established authors, with an aesthetic focus on experimental narrative, cultural transnationalism and cross-cultural poetics. The second issue, a spoken-word collection, would be released in 2013.
