= Afterburn (2025 film) =

2025 action film

- Theatrical release poster
- Directed by: J. J. Perry
- Screenplay by: Matt Johnson; Nimród Antal
- Based on: Afterburn by Scott Chitwood; Paul Ens
- Produced by: Toby Jaffe; Neal H. Moritz; Steve Richards; Kevin Weisberg; Ryan D. Adams; Clay Pecorin
- Starring: Dave Bautista; Olga Kurylenko; Kristofer Hivju; Samuel L. Jackson
- Cinematography: José David Montero
- Edited by: Luke Dunkley
- Music by: Roque Baños
- Production companies: Endurance Media; Original Film; Dogbone Entertainment
- Distributed by: Inaugural Entertainment; Endurance Media
- Release date: September 19, 2025 (United States)
- Running time: 105 minutes
- Countries: United States; Spain; Slovakia
- Language: English
- Budget: $56.7 million
- Box office: $1.3 million

Afterburn is a 2025 post-apocalyptic action film directed by J. J. Perry and written by Matt Johnson and Nimród Antal. It stars Dave Bautista, Samuel L. Jackson, Olga Kurylenko and Kristofer Hivju. It is based on the Red 5 Comics graphic novel of the same name by Scott Chitwood, Paul Ens, and Wayne Nichols. The story is set a decade after the Earth's technology was decimated by a solar flare. Original development began in 2018, then halted, and restarted in 2024.

== Plot ==
Six years after the Earth is devastated by a solar flare, Jake works for August Valentine, the self-proclaimed King of England, retrieving valuable pre-flare objects. In return, August funds Jake's dream of repairing a boat that he wishes to live on.

In exchange for having his men finish the job for a reluctant Jake, August requests him to travel into France to retrieve the Mona Lisa with the help of Drea, a member of a rebellion against the tyrannical warlord General Volkov. Chased by Volkov's forces, the two discover it in a vault at Ouvrage Simserhof, a fort on the Maginot Line. It's revealed that the Mona Lisa that Jake is after is actually an American atomic bomb, sister to Fat Man and Little Boy, sought by both August and Volkov. After Volkov captures the Mona Lisa, Jake boards his train, steals the bomb's stop plug, and escapes as Drea blows up a railroad bridge, derailing the train and killing Volkov.

Jake brings the stop plug to August and urges him not to recover the bomb from the gorge where it had ended up. August keeps up his end of the deal and Jake sets sail with Drea with whom he had fallen in love.

In a mid-credits scene, August visits a vault and hangs the stop plug on the real Mona Lisa.

== Cast ==
- Dave Bautista as Jake, an ex-soldier who works as a treasure hunter seeking pre-flare objects for powerful clients, among these being the Mona Lisa.
- Samuel L. Jackson as August Valentine, the "King of England" who is trying to rebuild the country. He is a frequent client of Jake's and hires him to recover the Mona Lisa
- Eden Epstein as Minister Fuentes, art collector representative for August.
- Olga Kurylenko as Drea, a freedom fighter.
- Kristofer Hivju as General Volkov, a warlord who rules part of France.

== Production ==
In March 2008, it was reported Tobey Maguire was attached to co-produce Afterburn, an adaptation of the comic of the same name by Scott Chitwood and Paul Ens published by Red 5 Comics, alongside Neal H. Moritz' Original Film. In September of that year, it was reported that Ryan Kavanaugh and Relativity Media had come aboard to produce Afterburn.

In November 2010, it was reported that Gerard Butler had entered negotiations to star in Afterburn with Antoine Fuqua in negotiations to direct. In April 2012, it was announced that Tommy Wirkola would direct with Fuqua having left the project to instead direct Butler in Olympus Has Fallen. On February 15, 2018, it was reported that Jung Byung-gil would direct the film, from a script by Matt Johnson and Nimród Antal with revisions by William N. "Bill" Collage;

By February 2024, Byung-gil and Butler dropped out; J. J. Perry was hired as the new director while Dave Bautista and Samuel L. Jackson were set as the leads with the Antal/Johnson script retained.

=== Filming ===
Principal photography began on May 10, 2024, in Bratislava, Slovakia. Filming wrapped on June 27. José David Montero serves as the cinematographer.

=== Post-production ===
In May 2025, Fourth Chance Productions was awarded $7.7 million by an arbitrator over fraud tied to the financing of the project after backer of the movie, Tristian Peter, was found to have defrauded the company and breached a purchase agreement in which he committed $7.5 million toward the production of the movie in exchange for an executive producer credit. Luke Dunkley edited the film.

=== Music ===
Roque Baños composed the score for the film.

== Release ==
Afterburn was first released in the Middle East, Germany, Austria, the Netherlands, and Israel on August 21, 2025, before being released in the United States on September 19.

== Reception ==
=== Critical response ===
According to film critic review aggregator site Rotten Tomatoes, it holds a Tomatometer rating of 10% based on 10 reviews and a Popcornmeter rating of 58% based on 50+ reviews, with Mark Keizer of MovieWeb writing; "J.J. Perry saddles Bautista with a severely underdeveloped example of the reluctant hero archetype, preferring that he punch, shoot and drive his way through a wasteland of action movie clichés rendered in relentless blacks and grays" and Hernán Ferreirós of La Nación (Argentina) writing; "It couldn't be more linear, and yet the story manages to get bogged down in every moment where there aren't grenades exploding in people's faces".
