= Ivy Alvarez =

Filipina-Australian poet, editor, and reviewer

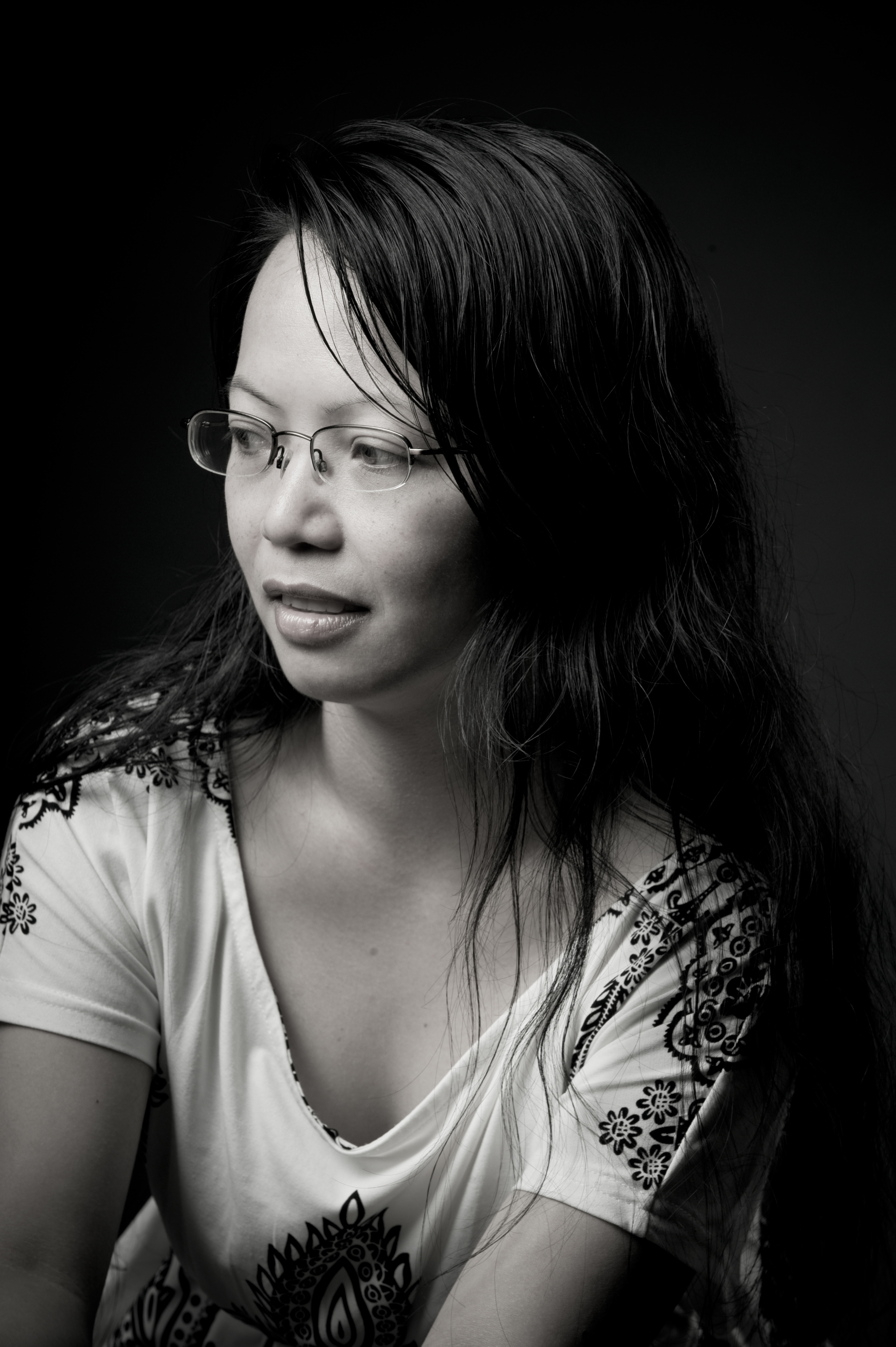
- Website: www.ivyalvarez.com

Ivy Alvarez is a New Zealand–based Filipina Australian poet, editor, and reviewer. Alvarez has had her work featured in various publications in Australia, Canada, England, the Philippines, New Zealand, Ireland, Russia, Scotland, Wales, the US, South Africa, and online.

== Early years ==
Alvarez was born in the Philippines and grew up in Tasmania, Australia. While studying English at the University of Tasmania, she was published in various literary journals and anthologies, and subsequently became the reviews editor of Cordite Poetry Review, an Australian online poetry journal.

== Literary career ==
In 2000, she won the Great Age Melbourne Writers Festival Poetry Slam. She moved to Aberdeen in 2002 and lived in Dublin between 2003 and 2004. In 2004, she was awarded a bursary from the Scottish Arvon Foundation and became the Special Poetry Guest to Dublin's Trinity College/Florida International University poetry summer program. She moved to Cardiff in 2004. During the same year, her poem "earth", which first appeared in the anthology Moorilla Mosaic: Contemporary Tasmanian Writing, was included in the Australian/Pacific Region Literacy Placement Test for Scholarships. Alvarez was awarded fellowships from MacDowell Colony (New Hampshire, USA) and Hawthornden Castle (Scotland) in 2005.

In 2006, she edited A Slice of Cherry Pie, a chapbook anthology inspired by David Lynch's TV show, Twin Peaks. That same year, she received a grant from Wales Arts International which enabled her to travel to Sydney and participate in The Red Room Company's "The Poetry Picture Show".

Her first poetry collection, Mortal, was released in 2006 by US publisher Red Morning Press. Craig Santos Perez, writing for Boxcar Poetry Review, called it "an incredible first collection" whose "casual tone, visceral imagery, and surprising figurative language keeps the reader engaged throughout."

In late 2006, Alvarez received The Australia Council Literature Board grant for poetry. She was invited on a writing residency by Fundación Valparaíso in Spain for April 2008, followed by a writing residency at the Booranga Writers Centre at Charles Sturt University in Wagga Wagga, New South Wales.

Alvarez was a Visiting Lecturer at the University of Chester in 2010 and a featured reader at Worcester College and Winchester University.

In May 2011, she spent two weeks at the Seoul Art Space (Yeonhui) and gave readings as a member of the Oz-Ko Tour of Korea. Her poem "Hold" was published and discussed in the Poetry Workshop section of The Guardian on 4 November 2011.

Alvarez has been a guest at numerous writing festivals, including the National Young Writers' Festival in Newcastle, New South Wales. As a performer of her work, she has been Artiste-in-Residence for Australia's SBS radio and TV network. Her poetry has been featured on the audio compilations FlightPaths, Going Down Swinging and You Have Been Chosen. In addition to poetry, she also writes plays, articles, and reviews. Alvarez was awarded funding for her second poetry manuscript from both the Australia Council and the Welsh Academy.

== Publications ==
Novel in verse

- Disturbance (Seren Books, 2013)

Poetry collections

- Food for Humans (Melbourne: Slow Joe Crow Press, 2002)
- catalogue: life as tableware (Wales: The Private Press, 2004)
- What's wrong (Wales: The Private Press, 2004)
- Mortal (Washington, DC: Red Morning Press, 2006)
- One Dozen Poison Hay(na)ku (2013)
- The Everyday English Dictionary (Paekakariki Press, 2016)

=== Edited volumes ===
- A Slice of Cherry Pie (The Private Press / Half Empty/Half Full, 2006)
- We Don’t Stop Here (The Private Press, 2008)
- The Chained Hay(na)ku Project (co-editor) (Meritage Press, 2010)

=== Anthology contributions ===
- Moorilla Mosaic (Bumble-bee Press, 2001)
- Father Poems (Anvil Publishing, 2004)
- The First Hay(na)ku Anthology (Meritage Press / xPress(ed), 2005)
- OBAN 06 (NZ Electronic Poetry Centre, 2006)
- NaPoWriMo (Big Game Books, 2006)
- From the Garden of the Gods (Sun Rising Press, 2006)
- The Musculature of Small Birds (Shadowbox Press, 2007)
- Brilliant Coroners (Phoenicia Publishing imprint, 2007)
- The Sex Mook: What is Our Sex? (Vignette Press, 2007)
- Letters to the World: Women Poets Anthology (Red Hen Press, 2008)
- The Best Australian Poems 2009 (Black Inc., 2009)
- Hair (Sydney: Trunk, 2009)
- Red Leaves / 紅葉 #001 (A Cowboy Named Molasses Publishing, 2010)
- Voice of Women in Wales (Wales Women's National Coalition, 2010)
- Fire On Her Tongue (Two Sylvias Press, 2011)
- In Their Cups (Melbourne Poets Union, 2011)
- A Face to Meet the Faces (University of Akron Press, 2012)
