= The Phoenix Requiem =

- Cover of Volume One
- Author(s): Sarah Ellerton
- Website: https://www.seraph-inn.com/phoenix.html
- Current status/schedule: Complete
- Launch date: September 27, 2007
- End date: March 16, 2011
- Genre(s): Drama, Fantasy, Romance

The Phoenix Requiem is a dystopic fantasy webcomic written and drawn by Sarah Ellerton, author and artist of Inverloch, which takes place in a setting similar to Victorian-era England. The comic's first pages was published on September 27, 2007, and the final pages were published on March 16, 2011. During its run, The Phoenix Requiem updated with 2-3 new pages on Mondays and Thursdays.

Ellerton described The Phoenix Requiem as "the story of one man trying to forget the ghosts of his past against a backdrop of a Victorian-era world, where magic, long lost to the people, may be returning."

== Plot summary ==
The story begins when Jonas Faulkner is found unconscious with two gunshot wounds in the woods outside the small town of Esk. He is nursed back to health by Anya Katsukova, a doctor-in-training, and the two became friends. Around the same time Jonas arrives a supernatural plague begins to affect the town of Esk, killing several of its inhabitants. Meanwhile, Robyn Hart, a former soldier who holds unreciprocated romantic feelings for Anya, begins seeing ghostly apparitions around the town.

During a ride in the forest, Jonas, Anya, Robyn, and their friend Petria encounter a "spirit," one of the beings from the ancient past who have been imprisoned for many centuries before the events of the story take place. Upon returning to the village, they are interrogated by an investigator from another city, Patrick Armand, who has been following Jonas since he was released from a mental hospital. Armand reveals that the plague in Esk had also befallen every other town Jonas had been through.

While working with her superior, Doctor Blythe, to find a cure for the spreading plague, Anya is visited again by a spirit. That night, she encounters a "shade", a monstrous manifestation of a person who has died a traumatic death, and the following morning, the plague had spread to a large number of people. Doctor Blythe sends Anya on an urgent mission to the medical research committee in Aubeny with data they have collected on the plague, to try to find a solution. However, the medical committee in Aubeny is indifferent to her findings, attributing the plague to food contamination instead while citing reports of the same plague from another town. She is dismissed outright when she mentions the shades.

Meanwhile, back in Esk, Robyn is attacked by a shade one night. He determines to fight back as the plague continues to spread and more shades appear, attacking the priest and threatening to overrun the town. A messenger is sent overnight on horseback to bring help to the escalating situation.

== Major characters ==
- Anya Katsukova

Anya Katsukova, is a nurse training to be a doctor. She is characterized as skeptical about the existence of magic, spirits and hellions, however, her beliefs began to change as the story progresses.

- Jonas Faulkner

Jonas Faulkner arrived in Esk after being severely wounded by gunshot for unknown reasons. He has a connection to otherworldly spirits, and is suspected by many characters of being somehow responsible for the plague that is occurring at the time of the story.

- Robyn Hart

Robyn is a former soldier who works as a herder of caribou at the time of the story. He is romantically interested in Anya. He claims that he has been able to see ghosts and other abnormal things for several months, with increased frequency around Jonas; as a result, he appears to be deeply distrustful of Jonas. He is close friends with Petria Grey.

- Petria Grey

Petria was abandoned at a young age by her parents, and survived by doing odd jobs around town; it is suggested that Robyn Hart has taken care of her in the past.

- Patrick Armand

A police officer who came to Esk looking for Jonas. He appears to believe Jonas responsible for the plague that is spreading.

== Reception ==
The Phoenix Requiem was nominated for 11 awards at the 2008 Web Cartoonists' Choice Awards, including Outstanding Comic. Top Web Comics has put Phoenix Requiem as the most popular webcomic on their site as of September 2008. Like its predecessor Inverloch, The Phoenix Requiem has received praise for its artwork. On the other hand, it was criticized early on for the slow pacing of its first volume. Richard Pulfer of Broken Frontier called the first volume of the comic "a fantastic-looking online graphic novel moving at a snail's pace," but stated that as the comic has progressed the characters have become more dynamic and the story more profound.

In 2008, The Phoenix Requiem won the award for Best Art in Frumph.net's WebComic Readers Choice Awards.
