= Tango (comics) =

Australian comic anthology

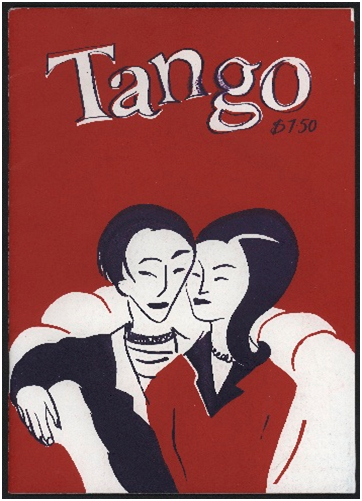
- Tango, first issue cover, 1997

Publication information
- Publisher: Cardigan Comics
- Schedule: irregular
- Format: Ongoing series
- Publication date: 1997 to 2009
- No. of issues: 9
- ISSN: 1833-2102

Creative team
- Artist(s): Bernard Caleo, Anita Baĉić, Robert De Graauw, Nicki Greenberg, Bruce Mutard, Mandy Ord, Jo Waite
- Editor: Bernard Caleo

Tango was a comics anthology published in Melbourne, Australia by Cardigan Comics, with nine issues of Tango, published intermittently from 1997 to 2009, and an additional compilation The Tango Collection, published in 2009 by Allen & Unwin.

== Overview ==
Tango is described as "the Australian romance comics anthology". Each issue features contributions by comic artists living and working in Melbourne and other parts of Australia and New Zealand. The first three issues of Tango were large format publications, inspired by large format anthologies from the United States such as the early issues of RAW. Later issues became smaller in format, and beginning with the fourth issue in 2001 (Tango Quatro), each has been sub-titled with a theme of "Love and ...". Respectively, the themes for issues four through nine have been: 'Love and Death', 'Love and the Senses', 'Love and Sex', 'Love and Sedition' 'Love and Food', and 'Love and War'. Drawing on contributions from the first eight issues of Tango, Allen and Unwin published The Tango Collection in 2009. In 2017-2018 the State Library of Victoria featured 'Tango' in its ongoing exhibition about the history of the book, 'The Mirror of the World'.

== The Creator of Tango ==
Bernard Caleo was the creator and editor of Tango, as well as being a contributor to each issue. Caleo is also a performer, speaker, interviewer, blogger and general promoter of comics and comic talent in Melbourne and more broadly in Australia and New Zealand.

== Origins ==
Spurred by the disappearance of an earlier Australian comic anthology, Fox Comics, Caleo wanted to provide a vehicle for both experienced and new comic artists to demonstrate and develop their talents. The chosen theme of romance is intended to evoke associations with both love and adventure.

== Issues ==
There were nine issues of Tango, with the last issue Tango 9: Love and War published in December 2009.

=== Tango ===
Published: 1997
Edited by: Bernard Caleo
Cover: Anita Baĉić
pp. 44

Stories	Artists
'If that Face of yours could only talk'	... Timothy Caleo and Bernard Caleo
'Now that my Girlfriend's moved out (1996)'	... Virginia Woolf-Whistle
'Killing Time'	... Rachel Martin
'The Cyman Guide to Romance'	... Simon Mealings
'Laundromat Love (1987)'	... Philip Bentley and Min Simas
'Crush'	... Mandy Ord
'Seymour'	... Robert De Graauw
'Persephone'	... Adam Possamaï and Samantha Fabry
'Closet Man'	... Mark Holsworth
'Daily Life Beat'	... Mary Anne Caleo
'Dream Girl'	... Virginia Woolf-Whistle
'Unrequited'	... Bill King and Bernard Caleo
'The Greatest Thing'	... Martin Trengove
'Hairy Comics Talk'	... Bruce Woolley and Bernard Caleo
'Starry Starry Night'	... Kirrily Schell
'I know I'm not to blame'	...Jonathan Marshall
'Oyle on Stone'	... Jo Waite
'Heart Burn'	... Bernard Caleo and John Murphy
'A work of Love'	... Caroline Lee
untitled	... Peter Fraser
'The Cyclops' Cry'	... Bernard Caleo
untitled	... Mandy Ord
'Wish you were here'	... Tolley
'Saturday night (1995)'	... Bernard Caleo
untitled	... Caroline Lee
'It was inevitable...'	... Stephen Dodds
'The Birds'	... Anne Radvansky
'I'm dreaming about cats (1992)'	... Lucy McCallum
'Page from the book about cats'	... Lucy McCallum

=== Two to Tango ===
Published: 1998
Edited by: Bernard Caleo
Cover: Anita Baĉić
pp. 56

Stories	Artists
'Spat'	... Mandy Ord
'The Search'	... Stuart Thomas
'Winter 98'	... Brendan Boyd
'Sweet Tooth'	... Nathalie Fernbach
'Now That My Girlfriend's Gone Overseas'	... Virginia Woolf-Whistle
'A Miniature Love'	... Adam Possamaï and Samantha Fabry
'They Haven't Seen Moves...'	... Daniel Schlusser
'Passing Glances'	... Rachel Martin
'Personal'	... Stuart Thomas
'Stakeout'	... Bruce Mutard
'Beastly Romance'	... Lily Hibberd
'Oh Bill'	... John Ryan
'Discovery'	... Peter Jetnikoff
'A~~i~~nt Love ~~Grand~~ a Bummer'	... Angela Savage
'Never Suede'	... Andy Symons and Marty Trengove
' Toast'	... Nicki Greenberg
'People, Underwater'	... Chloe Hooper
'The Stupid Monk'	... Night Song
'This is a Work of Love 2'	... Caroline Lee
'Aaaah Romance'	... Raina Savage
'Francis Bear'	... Gregory Mackay
'Tania and Me'	... Anna Valdor
'Too Long'	... Don Walker and Brendan Boyd
'Am Not! Are too!'	... Fi McKerrell and Tolley
'Spand-X and Gen-eric'	... Jeff Bow and John Murphy
'The Slow Train to your Heart'	... Bernard Caleo
'A Friend of a Friend...'	... Daniel Wolff
'Memories'	... Stuart Thomas
'The Last Supper'	... Daniel Aleppy
'Seymour'	... Robert De Graauw
'Wildest Dreams'	... Christopher and Jonathan Marshall
'Dead Letter Dropped'	... Richard Varbre
'In Your Face – Love Bites'	... Alex Rowe

=== Tango One Two Three ===
Published: 1999
Edited by: Bernard Caleo, Jo Waite and Adam Possamaï
Cover: Anita Baĉić
pp. 60

Stories	Artists
'In Melbourne Tonight'	... John Ryan
'Love Rides the Tram!'	... Susan Butcher and Carol Wood
'Love Pride & Destiny'	... Dillon Naylor
'Saturday Night in Melbourne'	... Jonathan Marshall
'Anatomizing Robert Burton'	... Bernard Caleo
'Anabella the 21st Century Dyke...'	... Sarah Lowe
'Four Seasons'	... Bruce Mutard
'A Passing Romance'	... Michael Fikaris
'Two-Page Traffic'	... Mandy Ord
'Sometime About Half-Past January'	... Daniel Wolff
'Laura and Steve'	... Robert De Graauw
'Feeling Distant'	... Brendan Boyd
'Our Public Building'	... Tim Danko
'Galatea'	... Adam Possamaï and Greg Gates
'Wishful Thinking'	... Andrew Symons and Martin Trengove
'Melbourne; City of Love'	... Jo Waite
'Unrequited Love'	... Q-ray
'Bad Hair Day'	... Jeff Bow and John Murphy
'We Be Deepe and Intelloctual'	... Lily Hibberd
'The Hard Path'	... Tolley
'Wish You Were Here...'	... Louise & Tony Single
'Life, Knife, Wife'	... Hama & Caleo
'Love Hurts'	... Naomi Trengove

=== Tango Quatro: Love and Death ===
Published: 2001
Edited by: Bernard Caleo
Cover: Anita Baĉić
pp. 100

Stories	Artists
'Form'	... Peter Jetnikoff
'Teen Death'	... Andy Symons and Marty Trengove
'MAPS'	... Jo Kasch
'The Goldfish Affair'	... Jenny Nestor
'Sonnet to Orpheus Part 1'	... Rachel Martin
'Wax Lyrical Comes Home'	... Drew Arthurson and Alf Shenoy
'First Impressions'	... Stewart McKenny, Amelita Wardell and Damien Shanahan
'Go Home'	... Bernard Caleo
'We'll Still Be Friends'	... Jared Lane
'The Uncut Hair of Graves'	... Adam Ford
'Love and Death'	... Peter Savieri
'Inanimate Objects in My Life'	... Michael Fikaris
'The Reserve'	... Gregory Mackay
'Untitled'	... Jonathon Marc Schmidt
'The Death of Montagovitch'	... Adam Possamaï and Alphia Inesedy
'A Bedtime Story'	... Louise Single, Michael Power and Tony Single
'Jim's Courage'	... David van Royen
'What Happened to Semele'	... Daniel Schlusser and Michael Camilleri
'Family Affair'	... Arlan Collins
'Did You Love It?'	... Kieran Mangan
'Till Death Do Us Part'	... Naomi Trengove
'Heartland Interlude'	... Brendan Boyd
'Sarah'	... Daniel McKeown
'Sum Holes'	... Tim Danko
'Adventures in Soulworld'	... Tim J Monley
'Sonnet to Orpheus Part 2'	... Daniel Wolff
'Love and Death'	... Jeff Bow and John Murphy
'Forgive'	... Bernard Caleo
'Soul Mates'	... Tolley
'In the Woods'	... Michael Camilleri
'Today Tomorrow'	... Jared Lane
'Seymour'	... Robert De Graauw
'Insomnia'	... Peter Jetnikoff
'Pigeon Man'	... Mandy Ord
'My Best Friend Josh'	... Virginia Woolf-Whistle
'12 Steps'	... Nicki Greenberg

=== Tango Five: Love and the Senses ===
Published: 2002
Edited by: Bernard Caleo
Cover: Anita Baĉić
pp. 142

Stories	Artists
'New Fresh Peach Fragrance'	... Bowb
'Sniff Sniff'	... Bernie Slater
'The Smell of Love'	... Andrew Weldon
'Jonquils Rainer'	... Mora Mathews
'Heaven Scent'	... Daniel McKeown and Jeremy Macpherson
'Stop Making Scents'	... Tolley
'On the Way'	... Michael Fikaris and Aaron O'Donnell
'She Recognised Him by His Smell'	... Mandy Ord
'Lovegloss'	... Rachael Baez and Marcelo Baez
'The Love Soup; or What Bosch did not Paint'	... Adam Possamaï and Alphia Possamaï-Inesedy
'Taste of Transgression'	... Donald Brooker
'Bad Taste?'	... Stephen Dodds
'Never Go to Bed Angry'	... Nicki Greenberg
'Seymour'	... Robert De Graauw
'Phoenix Meat Co.'	... Kirrily Schell
'beautiful jessica'	... Jonathon Marc Schmidt
'Heat Peter'	... Jetnikoff
'The Correction Centre'	... Steve Pike and Ka-Yin
'Warning!'	... Kieran Mangan
'Mendhi'	... Jenny Tyers
'Pillar of Salt'	... Jonathan Marshall
'Small Moments'	... Talitha Nonveiller
'Doggy Balls Forever!'	... Lindsay Arnold
'Fecundity'	... Anna Simic
'On Sight'	... Gregory Mackay
'Short Sighted Blues'	... Stefan Neville and Clayton Noone
'The Blind Date'	... Simon Turnbull
'Moeb's Cafe'	... Brendan Boyd
'Love at First'	... Shaggy
'Maybe Give it a Few More Months'	... David Blumenstein
'The Big Here'	... Mark Scillio and Bernard Caleo
'Find Your Dreams'	... Zeljko Radic
'...and I saw Love'	... G. Dante Sapienza
'Futbol et amor'	... Zeldz Magnoonis
'Sounds of Life through a Hollow Shell'	... Darran Jordan and Brian Jordan
'Sound Proof Room'	... Tim Danko
'Ear Facts'	... Anton Emdin
'Listen to Your Father!'	... Edo Fuijkschot
'The Tower'	... Jo Waite
'For Amelita'	... Stewart McKenny
'The Sounds of Romance'	... John Murphy
'Valentine and Isabelle'	... Isaac Miller, Ben Dewey and Carolyn Fraser
'The greatest Happiness is to be found in Longing'	... Tamara Wightson
'Foot-notes'	... Neale Blanden
'The Inner Ear'	... Suzanne Connolly and Jenny Nestor

=== Tango Six: Love and Sex ===
Published: 2005
Edited by: Bernard Caleo
Cover: Anita Baĉić
pp. 146

Stories	Artists
'The First Step'	... Thomas Gerhardt and Edo Fuijkschot
'"I Love You" in the Dark'	... Mike Delight
'It Was Day One of the New Millennium'	... Jared Lane
'All I Need'	... Shea Goodall
'Love is Blind'	... Phil Spinks
'Root Rat'	... Daniel Aleppy
'Medicine'	... Bruce Mutard
'Communication'	... Brendan Boyd
'Bargain'	... Peter Jetnikoff
'A Conversation of Heads'	... Nick Smith
'Celebrities and Pig Fat'	... Mandy Ord
'Caroline No!'	... Dave Hodson
'1001 Night Stands'	... Arthur Norman and Bernard Caleo
'You Can't Love in a Vacuum Part 1'	... John Murphy
'În Carne Şi Oase (In Flesh and Blood)'	... Adina Pintilie and Tolley
'Let Yourself...'	... Daren White
'Life Mirrored Through the Window's Soul'	... Darran Jordan and Brian Jordan
'Mating for Life'	... Ian C. Thomas
'Fool for Love'	... David Bird and Michael Nason
'Lament'	... Danny Matier and Somoin Ellz
'A New Life'	... Daniel McKeown and Jeremy Macpherson
'Three and a Half Weeks in May'	... Jonathon Marc Schmidt
'Sad are the Horny Comic Book Men'	... Andrew Weldon
'Erotic De Pizza of Love'	... Neale Blanden
'Take It or Leave It'	... Bernadette Trench-Thiedman
'Away'	... Michael Camilleri
'You Can't Love in a Vacuum Part 2'	... John Murphy
'The Amorous Adventures of Jane Digby Part 3'	... Philip Bentley and Angelo Madrid
'Just Because I'm Impotent Doesn't Mean I Don't Have Love to Give'	... Tony Camilleri
'Shadowdance'	... Talitha Nonveiller
'Lost and Found'	... Tolley
'Love and Sex'	... Stephen Dodds
'The Kindness of Strangers'	... Jo Waite
'Sexual Role-Playing for Bored Couples'	... Robert De Graauw
'Fertile Grounds'	... Edward J. Grug III
'One Day at a Cafe'	... Trav Burch, Stewart McKenny and Alan Smithee
'Perchance to Dream'	... Michael Michalandos, Tim McEwan and Andrew Phillips
'Love and Sex?'	... Richard Varbre
'The Pornographer's Trowsers'	... Bernard Caleo
'Love Egg'	... Kirrily Schell
'What Next Will Interrupt Us?'	... Bernard Caleo and Mark Scillio

=== Tango Seven: Love and Sedition ===
Published: 2007
Edited by: Bernard Caleo
Cover: Anita Baĉić
pp. 152

Stories	Artists
'Crossed Wires'	... Owen Heitmann
'What is Sedition?'	... David Blumenstein
'Love, Raed'	... Jason Franks and J. Marc Schmidt
'*Lucky Extract 'After the Funeral''	... Jo Waite
'no more fish in the sea'	... Glenn Smith
'Pigeon Coup'	... Nicole Skeltys and Aaron Doty
'Angry Butler Priests in Love'	... Tim Danko
'Appeal'	... Peter Jetnikoff
'Gunning for the Buddha'	... Bernard Caleo
'The Land Without Art'	... Brian Jordan and Darran Jordan
'Between the Thin Blue Line and Love'	... Nick Arnold
'Flyboy'	... Jason Franks with J. Marc Schmidt and Yuriko Sekine
'The Charles Atlas Guide to Love'	... Mat Adams
'Splatterheads'	... Glenn Pearce
'Love and Politics'	... Angela Savage and Bernard Caleo
'The Shining Silver Path'	... Tim Molloy
'End of Days'	... Tolley
'Hubba Hubba Hubba'	... Kirrily Schell
'Love and Sedition: a syllogism'	... Eloïse Bowden
'A Thousand Untold Words'	... Rodney Hamilton and Tania Rook
'Submergibles'	... Bernadette Trench-Thiedman
'Sometimes you should just tell your television how you really feel'	... Mandy Ord
'Next time you're smashing the state, don't go breaking my heart'	... Owen Heitmann
'Miscreant'	... Phil Spinks
'A Momentary Lapse of Unreason'	... Robert de Graauw
'Gorgeous George'	... Colleen Boyle
'Las Antipodas'	... Nicki Greenberg
'Back in the USSR'	... Brendan Boyd
'Qui Yue – Autumn Moon'	... Edo Fuijkschot
'Living Forwards'	... Sean M Elliott
'Sex and Seadition'	... Dave Hodson
'Down and Out in Paris'	... John Murphy
'A Child's Guide to Sedition'	... Mark Scillio and Bernard Caleo
'Maralinga Jones'	... Michael Camilleri
'Abba'	... Bruce Mutard

=== Tango Eight: Love and Food ===
Published: 2008
Edited by: Bernard Caleo
Cover: Anita Baĉić
pp. 242

Stories	Artists
'The Butter Fruit Tree'	... Zeldz Magoonis
'Love and Chinese Food'	... Aaron Doty
'Sweet Talk'	... Ian C. Thomas
'Food for Thought'	... Brendan J Boyd
'Twistie of Fate'	... Daniel Reed
'Flight'	... Colleen Burke
'A Humble and Afflicted Individual'	... Philip Bentley and David Bird
'True Blue Tales No. 229, #258, No. 37, #36'	... Simon Barnard
'Dinner's Over'	... Brendan Halyday
'Returning the Gift'	... Tim Molloy
'The Way to a Man's Heart'	... Bobby. N
'Limpid Biscuit: Part 1'	... Michael Camilleri
'Love vs. Food / Food vs. Love'	... Scott Matthews
'We Love Food – But Not As Much As We Love Each Other'	... Gina Monaco and Glenn Smith
'Cupcakes'	... Maude Farrugia
'Blood and Bone'	... Zackary Blackstone
'True Blue Tales No. 56, #47, No. 161, #35'	... Simon Barnard
'Lettuce Hearts'	... Miranda Burton
'The Adventures of the Genre Brothers'	... Bernard Caleo
'Madonna of the Pump'	... Colleen Boyle
'Choc Lovin'!'	... Gina Hanrahan and Shane Miller
'You'd be so nice to come home to'	... Richard Butler
'All-Consuming Love'	... Adi Firth
'Bitter Fruit'	... Nick Arnold
'Pretzel'	... Kirrily Schell
'For Natasha'	... Angela Savage and Bernard Caleo
'A Good Provider'	... Mandy Ord
'Gluten Free'	... Anthony Woodward
'Crispy Bacon'	... Andrew Fulton
'Digestion'	... Peter Jetnikoff
'Limpid Biscuit: Part 2'	... Michael Camilleri
'The Soak'	... Philip Spinks
'A Certain Hunger'	... Robert de Graauw
'The Food of Love'	... Dave Hodson
'Having You for Dinner'	... Will Tait
'Pizza Plus Banana Makes Rhesus Happy'	... James James
'Minimum Chips and a Bonk, Thanks'	... Neale Blanden
'Clichéd. Soppy. Heartfelt – for the most part, anyway'	... Paul Bedford, Matt Emery and Fleur Andrews
'Love and Sausage'	... Pat Grant
'Love and Food: some moments'	... Andrew Weldon
'Food, Love and the Grocery Separator'	... Paul Oslo Davis
'What's in a Sauce'	... Stephen Kok and Judy Teh
'Considerations in the Preparation of Food'	... Mark Scillio and Bernard Caleo
'Simple Pleasures: a guide to good fruit salad'	... Rodney Hamilton and Tania Rook
'Original Duplicate'	... Michael Fikaris
'Forbidden Fruit'	... Darran Jordan
'Beautiful People Covered in Blood'	... Gordon Reece
'Road to You'	... Goran Fak
'Damsel in Distress'	... Jason Franks and J. Marc Schmidt
'20,000 Leagues Under the C.B.D.'	... John Murphy
'They don't love like we do'	... Nicki Greenberg
'The Whaler'	... Simon Barnard
'Eat the Guests / Nudibranks Feeding / Breakfast Monkey'	... Scott Wright
'Why I Love Weeties'	... Rod Tokely and Glenn Lumsden
'Soul Food'	... Sean M Elliott
'The Cookie Lady'	... Meissa Reidy
'The Healing Pear'	... Tania Rook
'Thick and Thin'	... Bruce Mutard
'The Value of Saffron'	... Jenny Nestor
'A Recipe for Love'	... Adi Firth
'Anty Social Behaviour'	... Tolley
'Hot Plates'	... Toby Morris
'Seconds from Disaster!!!'	... Jo Waite
'Limpid Biscuit: Conclusion'	... Michael Camilleri
'Backword z'	... Bernard Caleo

=== Tango Nine: Love and War ===
Published: 2009
Edited by: Bernard Caleo
Cover: Peter Ra
pp. 346

Stories	Artists
'Nanna May's Backyard'	... Daniel Reed
'Mission to Mars'	... Anthony Woodward
'Something'	... Simon Barnard
'Cold Blood on the Trail of a Supply Column Chapter 1'	... Tim Danko
'Vulnerable'	... Keith Cameron and Brendan J Boyd
'The Necessity of Passion'	... Mandy Ord
'Great Love Battles'	... Adi Firth
'The Adventures of Electron'	... Max Denishensky and Andrew Weldon
'There and Back Again'	... Bruno Herfst
'A Recipe for Disaster'	... Paul Bedford and Ren El Hopsum
'Directions for my Conflicted Heart'	... Photocopied House
'Right to Life'	... Steve Colloff
'When Old Princep Shot the Archduke'	... J Marc Schmidt
'Things I Love and What They'd be Like if I Lived During War'	... Chris Chinchilla
'Underneath'	... Claire Murphy and Christine Rogers
'Cold Blood on the Trail of a Supply Column Chapter 2'	... Tim Danko
'Arrivals and Departures at 41 Cedar Drive'	... Robert De Graauw
'Love and War'	... John Murphy
'Love and War'	... Jo Waite
'One Love, One Heart'	... Marita Obst and Luke Pickett
'The 2 to 6 Shift'	... Kevin Janner and Bernard Caleo
'Soldier of Fortune'	... Michael Camilleri
'Nowhere to Hide'	... Ian C Thomas
'Love and Larvae'	... Mirranda Burton
'Large Inarticulate Monster Seeks Cold Metal Robot'	... Nick Arnold
'Born to Sorrow 2, The Second Bit'	... Aaron O'Donnell
'untitled'	... Zeldz Magnoonis
'War Games'	... Lisa Wardle
'A Simple Act of Preservation'	... Chris Downes
'Homefront'	... Greg Holfeld
'3000'	... Bernard Caleo and Tolley
'All Quiet on the Western Front: an adaptation'	... Tom Bonin
'Tanks'	... Andrew Fulton
'Ellewin & Arlbard'	... Jessica McLeod and Edward J Grugg III
'Monster Hands'	... Kate Geyer
'The War Within'	... Ed Siemienkowicz
'A Life'	... Michael Fikaris
'Cold Blood on the Trail of a Supply Column Chapter 3'	... Tim Danko
'When New Love Conquers Old Wars'	... Yvette Wroby
'Lyrebird Now'	... Bernadette Trench-Thiedman
'Title Fight'	... Nicki Greenberg
'untitled'	... Jayt Buchanan
'The Queen and the Soldier'	... Aaron Doty
'Love & Ruin'	... Adam Falloon
'Astyanax'	... Jen Breach and Trev Wood
'Orphans'	... Zackary Blackstone
'Love During Wartime?'	... Earl Leonard and Andrew Isaac
'Love is the Bomb'	... Scott Matthews
'Crush'	... Richard Butler
'Me, Myself and STIs'	... Sam Wallman
'Letter from Home'	... Owen Heitmann
'Corpsecar'	... Tim Molloy
'Love and War with Max and Tilly'	... Katy Knighton
'Love and Spandex'	... Liz Argall and Ben Hutchings
'All's Fair'	... Jason Franks
'The Last Soldier'	... Rocco Bosco and Darran Jordan
'Cold Blood on the Trail of a Supply Column Chapter 4'	... Tim Danko
'Strength'	... Peter Jetnikoff
'The Geneva Conventions on Love'	... Angela Savage and Bernard Caleo
'Kookabarry'	... David Follett
'Love and War'	... Bobby. N
'Smoking'	... Kirrily Schell
'A Brief History of Love and War'	... Peader Thomas
'Jan 1945 or Not Quite 14'	... Ann Van Dyk and Mel Rowsell
'Love has No Borders'	... Edo Fuijkschot
'A Humble and Afflicted Individual Returns'	... Phillip Bentley and David Bird
'Lovin' and Fightin''	... Oslo Davis
'Love and War'	... Neale Blanden
'Johno, Just Loving Wartime!'	... Snugwell
'Francis Bear'	... Gregory Mackay
'Xyla'	... Carl Morgan
'Loving Family'	... Pawel Zawislack
'In the Beginning'	... Bruce Mutard
'Love + War'	... Dave Hodson
'Shroom Love'	... Glenn Pearce
'Love and War and Icypoles'	... Chris Lassig
'Cupids'	... Maude Farrugia
'Love in the Time of Coppola'	... Edward and Claire Murphy
'Backword'	... Bernard Caleo
