= Fireballs (band) =

Australian psychobilly band

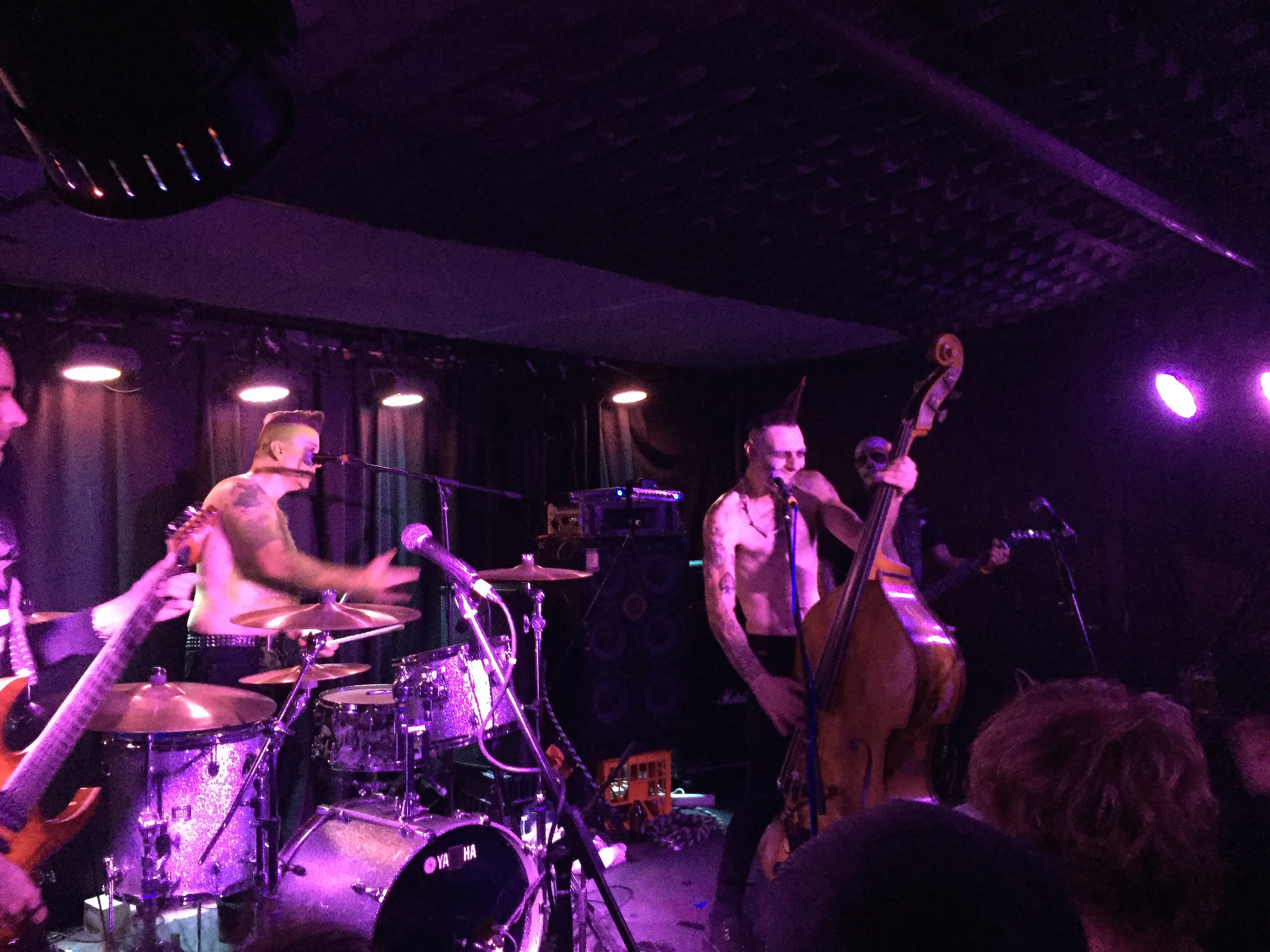
- At the Bendigo Hotel, Collingwood, January 2015

Background information
- Origin: Melbourne, Victoria, Australia
- Genres: Rockabilly; heavy metal; psychobilly; rock
- Years active: 1990–1997; 2005–present
- Labels: Blistered Finger/Shock; MDS; Rapido; Independent
- Members: Eddie Fury (Drums, lead vocals) Joe Phantom (bass, vocals) Dylan Villain (guitar) Pete Speed (guitar)
- Past members: Matt Healy

Fireballs are an Australian psychobilly band formed in May 1990 by Eddie Fury on drums and vocals, Matt Healy on guitar and Joe Phantom on bass and vocals. The trio issued three albums, Terminal Haircut (1992), Life Takes too Long (June 1994) and So Bad It's Good (1996), before disbanding in October 1997. The original line-up reformed in November 2005, after an eight-year absence, to support Mötley Crüe and Motörhead at the Blackjack festival in Perth. They subsequently played shows around Australia and Japan, and in 2007 Healy was replaced by Pete Speed and Dylan Villain, both on guitar. They released an album, Hellrider on 2010.

== History ==
Fireballs were formed in May 1990 in Melbourne by Eddie Fury on drums and vocals, Matt "Black" Healy on guitar and Joe Phantom on bass and vocals. Australian musicologist, Ian McFarlane, described how their, "style based around slap happy rockabilly roots welded to hyperactive speed metal guitar riffs and gravity-defying mohawk haircuts, [they] appealed to metal, punk and Cramps fans alike. The [group] had the distinction of breaking house attendance records at a number of inner-city Melbourne pubs."

Their first album, Terminal Haircut, appeared in 1992, it was produced by Bob Witherow for Blistered Finger Records/Shock Records. In June 1994 they issued their second album, Life Takes too Long, on MDS Records. McFarlane observed, "the subject matter of the band's songs ran the gamut of fast cars ('Go Go Go'), aliens and horror films ('Spaceman Rock'n'Roll'), sex ('Bondage'), drugs ('Something to Think About') and not much else." They also played at the Big Day Out in 1995.

According to The Age's Michael Dwyer, they played up to 400 shows a year and "broke enough house attendance records to warrant their own Fire Department file." The Fireballs are the titular subject in a series of three comics by Dillon Naylor from 1996 to 1997. McFarlane reflected, "[they] focused on the band's ridiculously hectic lifestyle with plenty of guaranteed laughs." Naylor had also provided graphics for the group since their formation. Their next album, So Bad Its Good (July 1996); McFarlane opined, "contained a feast of distorted guitars, bone-rattling percussion and sprinting bass lines."

In October 1997 the pace of touring and other pressures caused the band to split. During their tenure they had supported tours by Dick Dale, the Supersuckers, Kiss, The 5.6.7.8's, Porno for Pyros, Midnight Oil and Primus. Eight years after disbanding, in November 2005, they reunited to support Mötley Crüe at the Blackjack festival in Perth. In 2007 Healy was replaced by Pete Speed and Dylan Villain, both on guitar. The group continued to play occasional shows and released another album, Hellrider (2010). As from August 2016 they had resumed after an enforced hiatus due to a work place injury to Phantom, "[he] got injured 18 months ago and his work’s stuffed him around, basically. He pinched a nerve in his neck so they've put him on light duties." Paul Miles of What's My Scene caught their gig in November 2017, "as part of their national tour with Tiger Army."

== Members ==
- Eddie Fury – drums, lead vocals
- Matt Healy – guitar
- Joe Phantom – bass, vocals
- Pete Speed – guitar
- Dylan Villain – guitar

== Discography ==
=== Albums ===
- Terminal Haircut (1992) – Blistered Finger Records/Shock Records
- Life Takes too Long (1995) – MDS
- So Bad It's Good (1996) – MDS
- Hellrider (2010)

=== Extended plays ===
- Fall of the Damned (1993)
- Fireballs (1997)

=== Singles ===
- Don't Bother Me (1995)
- So Bad It's Good (1996)
- Voodoo (1996)

=== Comics ===
- Fireballs, issue 1 – written and illustrated by Dillon Naylor (1996)
- Fireballs, issue 2 – written and illustrated by Dillon Naylor (1997)
- Fireballs, issue 3 – written and illustrated by Dillon Naylor (1997)

== See also ==
- List of psychobilly bands
