= Frew Publications =

Australian comic book publisher

Frew Publications Pty. Ltd.
- Founded: 1948
- Founder: Ron Forsyth, Jim Richardson, Jack Eisen, Peter Watson
- Country of origin: Australia
- Headquarters location: Unit 13, 77-79 Bourke Road Alexandria, New South Wales
- Key people: Glenn Ford and Rene White; Dudley Hogarth (Publisher)
- Publication types: Comics
- Fiction genres: Adventure
- Official website: https://www.phantomcomic.com.au/

Frew Publications is an Australian comic book publisher, known for its long-running reprint series of Lee Falk's The Phantom. Frew formerly published other comics, including Falk's earlier creation Mandrake the Magician.

== History ==
Frew Publications was founded in 1948 by Ron Forsyth, Lawford 'Jim' Richardson, Jack Eisen, and Peter Watson, with each contributing 500 Australian pounds to establish the publisher. The name "Frew" is an acronym made from the surnames of the four founders, Forsyth, Richardson, Eisen, and Watson. Eisen and Watson withdrew from the company before the first publication was issued.

Forsyth and Richardson approached Yaffa Syndicate the Australian representative of King Features Syndicate about producing an Australian comic book issue of The Phantom. The agreement was conditional that Frew could not print any stories that was currently running in other publications, nor any story soon after it had appeared in the Australian Woman's Mirror. The first edition of The Phantom, "The Slave Traders", published by Frew debuted on 9 September 1948. The first two issues were not numbered and printed in a landscape format, with the staples were on the short edge of the cover. The third issue, "Mr Hog", was the first to be numbered and reverted to the traditional portrait format.

Between 1949 and 1958 Frew also published comics including Popeye, The Phantom Ranger, The Shadow (an Australian creation not to be confused with the American version of The Shadow), Sir Falcon, Catman and Super Yank Comics, peaking to a total of thirty titles in the mid 1950s. One of its local titles, which apparently lasted only one issue, was The Suicide Squad, which predated the DC Comics group by seven years (which its creator Robert Kanigher had stole the title). In the early 1960s due to the influx of imported American titles Frew reduced their publications to a single title, The Phantom.

In November 1978 Frew published its first Swedish Phantom adventure entitled "The Ghost" (Issue #730), although it was not until January 1983 that another Swedish story appeared, "The Tiger from Rangoon" (Issue #763).

In 1987 Forsyth and Richardson engaged Jim Shepherd as a consultant, the following year he was employed as its managing director. Shepherd and Forsyth's son, Peter subsequently bought all the shares in the company. In 1995 Shepherd purchased Forsyth's shareholdings, becoming the sole owner of Frew Publications.

In 1990 Frew published the first ever Australian created Phantom adventure, "Rumble in the Jungle" (Issue #951A), with art by Keith Chatto and the story by Jim Shepherd. Chatto and Shepherd produced another two Phantom stories "Return of the Singh Brotherhood" (Issue #962) and "The Kings Cross Connection" (Issue #1000). Shepherd also wrote another story "The Search for Byron", published March 1996 (Issue #1131), which was illustrated by Glenn Ford.

On the 15 April 2013 Shepherd died of a heart attack at his Sydney home, at age eighty. He is survived by his wife Judith, who was also the senior editor at Frew Publications and son, Stephen. In 2016, the company and licence was purchased by Glenn Ford and Rene White

Frew has a tradition of using their own cover art, created specially for the publisher. Cover artists have included Tommy Hughes, Keith Chatto, Terry Welsby (credited as "Tessa"), Glenn Ford, Antonio Lemos, Meg Coates, Terry Lee, Paul Agnew, Jason Frazer, Jeremy MacPherson, Wai-Chew Chan, and Shane Foley Jamie Johnson.

In 2017, some of the classic Frew characters were revived in new adventures in a new series of Giantsize Phantom. Stories include:

- "Sir Falcon: Riddles in Armour and Black" by Shane Foley
- "The Phantom Ranger: Phantoms" by Shane Foley
- "Sir Falcon": "The Stolen Chronicle" by Shane Foley
- "Planetman" by Shane Foley
- "Planetman" by Christopher Sequeira, Massimo Gamberi, and Luca Giorgi
- "The Shadow" by Jeremy MacPherson
- "The Phantom Ranger" by Felmang and Max Fish

== The Phantom publishing chronology ==
The following section is a publishing chronology for the years when Frew used original titles. The first edition of The Phantom was issued in Australia in 1948 and it has today reached an estimated circulation of 25000 units. As of 2007, Frew sales figures place The Phantom's distribution above all other contemporary comic books sold in Australia. It also places first in duration of publication: in 2006 Frew celebrated 70 years of continuity, longer than any other Australian comics syndicate.

=== 1948 ===
Edition Number	Production Code	Official Title	Frew Working Title	Writer	Artist
1	D9	The Slave Traders	Enter the Phantom	Lee Falk	Raymond Moore
2	D28	Queen Asta of Trondeley	In the Tiger's Lair	Lee Falk	Wilson McCoy
3	D29	Mister Hog	Smashing the Crime Ring	Lee Falk	Wilson McCoy
4	D30	Romance Pt 2	The Phantom versus the Jewel Thieves	Lee Falk	Wilson McCoy
5	D15	The Phantom's Treasure	The Phantom's Treasure Stolen	Lee Falk	Raymond Moore

=== 1949 ===
Edition Number	Production Code	Official Title	Frew Working Title	Writer	Artist
6	D1	The Singh Brotherhood Pt 2	The Phantom's Revenge	Lee Falk	Lee Falk, Raymond Moore
7	D13	The Game of Alvar Pt 2	The Phantom versus the Gun Runners	Lee Falk	Raymond Moore
8	D2	The Sky Band Pt 2	Death to the Sky Band	Lee Falk	Raymond Moore
9	D8	Fishers of Pearls	The Pearl Pirates	Lee Falk	Raymond Moore
10	D12	The Seahorse Pt 1	The Phantom versus the Spy Ring	Lee Falk	Raymond Moore
11	D12	The Seahorse Pt 2	On Bleak Island	Lee Falk	Raymond Moore
12	D7	The Shark's Nest	The Shark's Nest	Lee Falk	Raymond Moore
13	D11	The Golden Circle Pt 1	The Phantom's Dilemma	Lee Falk	Raymond Moore
14	D11	The Golden Circle Pt 2	Golden Circle Pt 2	Lee Falk	Raymond Moore
15	D11	The Golden Circle Pt 3	The Poison Gas Chamber	Lee Falk	Raymond Moore
16	D6	Adventure in Algiers	Adventure in Algiers	Lee Falk	Raymond Moore
17	D10	The Mysterious Girl Pt 1	Kidnapped in Egypt	Lee Falk	Raymond Moore

=== 1950 ===
Edition Number	Production Code	Official Title	Frew Working Title	Writer	Artist
18	D10	The Mysterious Girl Part 2	Trapped Under the Sea	Lee Falk	Raymond Moore
19	S12	The Golden Princess	The Golden Princess	Lee Falk	Wilson McCoy
20	S8	Castle in the Clouds Pt 2	The Phantom versus the Old Man of the Mountains	Lee Falk	Raymond Moore, Wilson McCoy
20	S9	The Ismani Cannibals	The Ismani Cannibals	Lee Falk	Wilson McCoy
21	D5	The Prisoner of the Himalayas Pt 1	The Kidnapped Bride	Lee Falk	Raymond Moore
22	D5	The Prisoner of the Himalayas Pt 2	Sentenced to Death	Lee Falk	Raymond Moore
23	D14	Diana Aviatrix Lost Pt 1	Jungle Victory	Lee Falk	Raymond Moore
24	D14	Diana Aviatrix Lost Pt 2	The Phantom's Triumph	Lee Falk	Raymond Moore
25	D22	The Maharajah's Daughter Pt 1	The Kidnapped Maharajah	Lee Falk	Wilson McCoy
26	D22	The Maharajah's Daughter Pt 2	The Royal Prisoner	Lee Falk	Wilson McCoy
27	D16	The Phantom Goes to War Pt 1	The Phantom Goes to War	Lee Falk	Raymond Moore, Wilson McCoy
28	D16	The Phantom Goes to War Pt 2	The Red Invaders	Lee Falk	Raymond Moore, Wilson McCoy

=== 1951 ===
Edition Number	Production Code	Official Title	Frew Working Title	Writer	Artist
29	D16	The Phantom Goes to War Pt 3	Death to the Invaders	Lee Falk	Raymond Moore, Wilson McCoy
30	D16	The Phantom Goes to War Pt 4	The Hero of Oolan	Lee Falk	Raymond Moore, Wilson McCoy
31	S10	Hamid the Terrible Pt 1	Hamid the Terrible	Lee Falk	Wilson McCoy
32	S10	Hamid the Terrible Pt 2	The Sultan's Prisoner	Lee Falk	Wilson McCoy
33	D17	Bent Beak Broder	Bent Beak and the Phantom Mark	Lee Falk	Wilson McCoy
34	D18	The Phantom's Engagement	The Phantom's Engagement	Lee Falk	Wilson McCoy
35	S11	The Young Phantom, The Childhood of the Phantom	The Young Phantom	Lee Falk	Wilson McCoy
36	S15	King of Beasts	King of Beasts	Lee Falk	Raymond Moore
37	S16	The Scarlett Sorceress	The Kidnapped Princess	Lee Falk	Raymond Moore, Wilson McCoy
38	S14	Queen Pera the Perfect	The Reluctant Bridegroom	Lee Falk	Raymond Moore
39	S18	The Dragon God	The Dragon God	Lee Falk	Raymond Moore
40	S13	The Strange Fisherman	The Strange Fisherman	Lee Falk	Wilson McCoy

=== 1952 ===
Edition Number	Production Code	Official Title	Frew Working Title	Writer	Artist
41	D24	Lago the Lake God	Underwater Doom	Lee Falk	Wilson McCoy
42	D25	The Wild Girl	The Lion Woman	Lee Falk	Wilson McCoy
43	S1	The League of Lost Men	The League of Lost Men	Lee Falk	Raymond Moore
44	S4	The Beachcomber	The Beachcomber	Lee Falk	Raymond Moore
45	S2	The Precious Cargo of Colonel Winn	The Precious Cargo of Colonel Winn	Lee Falk	Raymond Moore
46	D41	Whirlpool Channel	Whirlpool Channel	Lee Falk	Wilson McCoy
47	D27	Princess Valerie Pt 1	Princess Valerie Pt 1	Lee Falk	Raymond Moore, Wilson McCoy
48	D27	Princess Valerie Pt 2	The Phantom versus the Hairy Twins	Lee Falk	Raymond Moore, Wilson McCoy
49	S21	The Haunted Castle	The Haunted Castle	Lee Falk	Raymond Moore, Wilson McCoy
50	D42	The Tiger Girl	The Tiger Girl	Lee Falk	Wilson McCoy
51	S3	The Fire Goddess	The Fire Goddess	Lee Falk	Raymond Moore
52	D39	The White Monkey	The White Monkey	Lee Falk	Wilson McCoy
53	D32	The Lady Luck Part 1	The Lady Luck Part 1	Lee Falk	Wilson McCoy

=== Notes ===
==== Unnumbered editions ====
The following Frew editions were without edition numbers when issued. For ease of reference, official Frew archivists have assigned them either an 'A' or a 'B' as per their publishing date:

- 1
- 2
- 65A
- 76A
- 76B
- 817A
- 825A
- 840A
- 858A

==== Untitled editions ====
In editions 43-47, 49-821 and 823-828 no story title appeared on the front cover. Frew did not alter the official titles, which in most instances appeared at the start of the story.

==== Missing edition ====
Due to an accident in production, edition number 330 was never issued. Edition number 331 was substituted in its place. A retro "replica" #330 was later issued together with the 2019 Annual Special (#1830).

==== Exclusions ====
List is restricted to pure Phantom comic books; supplementary Frew editions and associated publications have been excluded.
