= David Blumenstein =

Cartoonist (b. 1980)

David Blumenstein (born 1980) is a service designer, writer, cartoonist and animation director based in Melbourne. He is a founding member of Squishface Studio, a co-share workspace for comic artists.

== Animation ==
Blumenstein's film Shit Party was a selection of the 2002 Melbourne International Film Festival.

He directed the short animated film Herman, the Legal Labrador in 2004; it starred Shaun Micallef, Katrina Mathers, Loc Nghe and Santo Cilauro. He later directed the music video The Happiest Boy for The Bedroom Philosopher, segments of the C31 anthology series Take One and the animated series Be A Man.

He worked as a storyboard artist on the children's series Wakkaville and Jar Dwellers SOS, and as an animator on the children's series Dogstar and the adult animated series Pacific Heat.

In 2014 he was one of a group of animators selected for the Designing Dreams Studio, an initiative of ACMI and DreamWorks.

== Comics ==
In 2012, Blumenstein co-founded Squishface Studio, Australia's first open comics studio, which functions as a workplace, retail space and classroom. It supports itself through workshops and memberships. He was also part of the Caravan of Comics, a cartoonist tour of North America.

In 2013, he won an award for Graphic Short Story in Melbourne's Lord Mayor's Creative Writing Awards for a piece called The Bolt Report. Blumenstein wrote the piece in epistolary voice, as his school-aged younger brother, Tristian, completing a media studies assignment. The piece was subsequently attacked by its subject, conservative commentator Andrew Bolt. Blumenstein later continued writing in Tristian's voice for pieces published at Daily Review and The Lifted Brow.

He also illustrated a comics piece written by Paul Owen covering the Australian federal election for Guardian Australia.

In 2015, Blumenstein wrote #takedown: My evening on a pier with pick-up artists and protesters, a book about professional pickup artist Julien Blanc, who was heavily protested, and eventually ejected from the country, while on a controversial tour of Australia.

After submitting a piece by Tristian to the Senate inquiry into George Brandis' funding cuts to the Australia Council for the Arts in 2015, Blumenstein was warned that making a submission purporting to be from a non-existent person could find him in contempt of Senate. He withdrew Tristian's submission but made one himself on behalf of Squishface Studio.

Blumenstein wrote Free Money, Please in 2019 and released it simultaneously on Medium and zco.mx. It is a graphic essay about cryptocurrency and passive income.

He is deputy president of the Australian Cartoonists' Association. In December 2019 a complaint was made against him by member Rod Emmerson following a cartoon/Twitter thread Blumenstein published drawing a link between News Corp's vilification of minorities and the atrocities that follow.

In January 2020 The Guardian published Why Los Angeles is Scientology's perfect city – an illustrated guide, a non-fiction comic about the city of Los Angeles and the Church of Scientology.

Squishbook: Make comics with Squishface Studio and friends! (2024) was edited by Blumenstein and received a Highly Commended in the 2025 Victorian Premier's Literary Awards.

In 2025 Blumenstein was featured in the Behind The Lines cartoon exhibition at the Museum of Australian Democracy.

== Other media ==
In 2014 Blumenstein was interviewed by comedian/writer Justin Heazlewood for the book Funemployed, which is about the financial challenges that face artists working in Australia. He also appeared on the subsequent ABC radio series of the same name.

Blumenstein co-hosted a podcast in 2017 called Pitchface in which he and co-host Adam Wajnberg pitch creative and business ideas. He has also appeared on podcasts including xDiscipline and Graphic Nature.

In 2020 he wrote about government communications on COVID-19 for ArtsHub.

== Design career ==
Currently Blumenstein works as a service designer and visual communicator. He was hired in 2015 as a founding designer in the IAG Labs, and spoke about his drawing, prototyping and design work at the UX Australia conference in 2017.

== Bibliography ==
- Herding Kites: A Celebration of Australian Writing (2008), by Michael Williams (Editor)
- Sciensatics, Going Down Swinging, no.30, 2010, p. 72-75 (ISSN 0157-3950)
- Showman? : the Bret Braddock adventures (2011), Nakedfella Productions
- Showman? : the Bret Braddock adventures. vol. 2 : overtime approved (2013)
- Tristian Oversees : France, England and America Thru the Eyes of Australia's Youngest Political Journalist (2016), Nakedfella Productions, ISBN 978-0-9873912-2-3
- #takedown: My evening on a pier with pick-up artists and protesters (2015), Pikitia Press, ISBN 978-0-9873912-2-3
- What we Tell Them: A story Book by Mr Tony Abbott (2019)
- š! #37 'Down Down Under' (š!, #37) by Kuš! (Editor)
- Squishbook : Make comics with Squishface Studio and friends! (2024), David Blumenstein (Editor)
- Cartoonists for Palestine (2024)

== Personal life ==
Blumenstein is married to Squishface Studio artist Sarah Howell.
