= Craig Phillips (cartoonist) =

New Zealand author and artist

Craig Phillips (born in Australia, 1974) is a New Zealand-based author and illustrator.

== Career ==
Craig Phillips has worked as a professional illustrator for the US and Australian publishing industries for twenty years. His client list includes Random House, Scholastic, Simon and Schuster, Hachette, Hardie Grant, Bloomsbury, Oxford University Press and many more. His work has appeared in art anthologies such as The Society of Illustrators Annual, Spectrum Fantastic Art Annual and Luerzers 200 Best Illustrators Worldwide, and has been exhibited at the Museum of American Illustration. Phillips also worked on Neil Gaiman's American Gods in 2017. Phillips has created illustrations for book publishers and poster art for Queens of the Stone Age, The Hives, Foo Fighters, with work appearing in the books The Art Of Modern Rock (published by Chronicle Books).

== Comics ==
Phillips' earliest solo comics were the cult comics Finch! from Little Hammer Studio in 2002. His first mainstream graphic novel, Giants, Trolls, Witches, Beasts: Ten Tales from the Deep Dark Woods, published by Allen & Unwin, was the recipient of the Russell Clark Award for Illustration at the New Zealand Book Awards for Children and Young Adults 2018 and a Gold Ledger Award, as well as being named a Notable Book in the Children's Book Council of Australia Awards. Then followed the first two graphic novels in the series The Adventures of Jack Scratch, the Bande Dessinee style adventures of a pirate cat - Jack Scratch - The Quest for the Hiss-paniola and Jack Scratch - The Curse of the Kraken.

== Children's books ==
Phillips co-wrote (with Rebekah Lipp) and illustrated the best selling picture book, Aroha's Way - A Children's Guide through Emotions, which has appeared in the Nielsen Bestsellers List many times and ranked #3 in the Whitcoulls Kids' Top 50 Books List 2020. Aroha's Way is a picture book for children around uncomfortable emotions; fear, apprehension, worrying thoughts and nervousness with ways to manage them, and has been recommended by University of Auckland Professor, Peter O'Connor for discussing anxiety in an educational setting. It has been translated into Te Reo Māori, Aroha Te Whai Ora - He mahere piropiro mā te tamariki, by Karena Kelly. He co-founded Wildling Books in 2018 with Rebekah Lipp, in order to have full creative freedom to create beautiful and meaningful books for children.

Other Aroha Friend series titles include:

Let It Go - Emotions are energy in motion encourages children to explore what emotions - sadness, anger, shame and fear - feel like in their body and help to find a unique way to release them.

Aroha Knows helps children think about how they feel in nature and how that effects wellbeing. Part of the price is donated to Trees that Count.
