= Andrew Weldon =

Australian cartoonist

Andrew Weldon is an Australian cartoonist and illustrator based in Melbourne.

== Career ==
Andrew Weldon is a cartoonist and illustrator based in Melbourne, Australia. He has been a cartoonist for The Big Issue since 2006. His cartoons have also appeared in The Sydney Morning Herald, The Age, The Australian, Tango, The New Yorker, The Spectator, and Private Eye.

He has written and illustrated children's books including The Kid With The Amazing Head (Penguin 1998) and Clever Trevor's Stupendous Inventions (Penguin 1999). Collections of his gag cartoons, I'm So Sorry Little Man, I Thought You Were A Hand-Puppet and If You Weren't a Hedgehog...If I Weren't a Hemophiliac were published by Allen & Unwin. He also illustrated the Don't Look Now series, written by Paul Jennings.

== Selected publications ==
=== Author and illustrator ===
- I'm So Sorry Little Man, I Thought You Were A Hand-Puppet. Allen & Unwin, 2002. ISBN 978-1865087825.
- Really-It's Not You, It's Me: Cartoons About Love, Sex and Relationships. Riverhead Trade, 2006. ISBN 978-1594481970.
- If You Weren't a Hedgehog...If I Weren't a Hemophiliac: 232 Cartoons. Allen & Unwin, 2009. ISBN 9780740790393.
- The Kid with the Amazing Head. Puffin, 2016. ISBN 9780143309161.
- Clever Trevor's Stupendous Inventions. Puffin, 2016. ISBN 978-0143309154.

=== Illustrator ===
- Jordan, Mary Ellen. Lazy Daisy, Cranky Frankie: Bedtime on the Farm. Albert Whitman & Company, 2013. ISBN 978-0807544006.
- Jennings, Paul. Don't Look Now Book 1: Falling For It and The Kangapoo Key Ring. Allen & Unwin, 2015. ISBN 978-1743311233.
- Jennings, Paul. Don't Look Now Book 2: A Magician Never Tells and Elephant Bones. Allen & Unwin, 2015. ISBN 978-1743311400.
- Jennings, Paul. Don't Look Now Book 3: Hair Cut and Just a Nibble. Allen & Unwin, 2015. ISBN 978-1743311417.
- Jennings, Paul. Don't Look Now Book 4: Hobby Farm and Seeing Red. Allen & Unwin, 2016. ISBN 978-1743311424.
- Cece, Adam. The Extremely Weird Thing that Happened in Huggabie Falls. Text Publishing, 2018. ISBN 9781925603484.
- Greenslade, Tosh. The Scomo Diaries: My First Eighteen Months at the Coalface. Penguin, 2020. ISBN 9781760899080.
