= Nicki Greenberg =

Australian artist

- Born: 6 October 1974 (age 51); Melbourne, Australia
- Known for: Comics artist, Illustrator
- Notable work: The Great Gatsby: a graphic novel adaptation
- Website: nickigreenberg.com

Nicki Greenberg is a Melbourne-based Australian comic artist and illustrator.

== Early life ==
Greenberg had early success when in 1990, at the age of fifteen, she published The Digits, a series of twelve books featuring her fingerprints as characters. The books sold over 380,000 copies in Australia and New Zealand.

== Career ==
Her graphic novel adaptation of F. Scott Fitzgerald's The Great Gatsby (The Great Gatsby: A Graphic Adaptation) was published in 2007 by Allen & Unwin in Australia and by Penguin in Canada. Her graphic adaptation of Hamlet was published by Allen & Unwin in 2010.

She has written and illustrated a number of other children's books, including Squids Suck (2005), Antonia Cutlass Walks the Plank (2006), and Operation Weasel Ball (2007). Greenberg is a regular contributor to the regular Australian comics anthology Tango, edited by Bernard Caleo and published by Cardigan Comics.

In 2009, Greenberg's work appeared in Super Heroes and Schlemiels: Jews and Comic Art, an exhibition of comic art at the Jewish Museum of Australia in Melbourne. She has been interviewed by The New Yorker in its on-line cartoon forum, by Jennifer Byrne on ABC1 television, and as part of The Book Show on ABC radio.
