= Ward O'Neill =

Australian cartoonist

Ward O’Neill (born 1951) is an Australian illustrator, caricaturist and cartoonist, who has contributed to a variety of newspapers, including The London Daily Mail, The Australian, Sydney Morning Herald, National Times, the Bulletin and Australian Financial Review. His credits include Walkley Awards for illustration in 1982, 1984 and 1986.In 2018 he was awarded the Prix International at the Saint-Just—le- Martel Salon.
