= Wayne Nichols =

Australian comic book artist (born 1978)

Wayne Nichols (born 22 June 1978) is an Australian comic book artist, best known for his work in the American comic book industry. He has illustrated titles for major publishers including Marvel Comics (The Incredible Hulk, Exiles), IDW Publishing (Orphan Black, The X-Files) and Dark Horse Comics (Star Wars: The Force Unleashed, Falling Skies).

Nichols has also worked in concept art, storyboarding and commercial illustration for Australian and International clients including H&M, Apple Music, MTV, Jacobs Creek, Crown Casino, Coca-Cola, MasterCard, Telstra and the Royal Australian Air Force.

In 2008 he developed character and environment designs and pencilled the four-issue comic series Afterburn for Red 5 Comics. The series was later adapted into the action film Afterburn, starring Dave Bautista and Samuel L. Jackson.

Nichols is based in Brisbane, Australia.

== Early life ==
Nichols was born in Adelaide, Australia. He developed an interest in comics and illustration at an early age before pursuing professional work in the comic book industry.

== Career ==
Nichols began working in the American comic book industry in the early 2000s. He produced artwork for several titles published by Marvel Comics including The Incredible Hulk and Exiles.

He later worked with IDW Publishing on licensed comic series including Orphan Black and The X-Files.

Nichols also co-illustrated the graphic novel adaptation of Star Wars: The Force Unleashed for Dark Horse Comics.

In 2008, Nichols created character and environment designs and pencilled the four-issue comic series Afterburn for Red 5 Comics. The series was later adapted into the action film Afterburn.

== Exhibitions & public artwork ==
=== 2016 ===
Marvel: Creating the Cinematic Universe

Queensland Gallery of Modern Art (GOMA), Brisbane. “Homage to Spider-Man”, Original mural artwork designed for the exhibition.

=== 2019 ===
Marvel: Journey of Heroes

Melbourne Central exhibition celebrating Marvel's 80th anniversary. Original Marvel artwork featured alongside Australian comic artists.

=== 2025 ===
Deadpool × Wrexham Down Under Tour

Marvel Stadium, Melbourne. Original Deadpool and Wolverine Artwork created for the Wrexham AFC tour promotion.

=== 2026 ===
Ed Sheeran “Loop Tour”

Marvel Stadium, Melbourne. Large-scale promotional artwork depicting Ed Sheeran and Marvel's Thor.

== Selected bibliography ==
- Giant-Size Incredible Hulk #1 (Marvel Comics)
- Exiles: Days of Then and Now (Marvel Comics)
- Bill and Ted Roll The Dice #1-4 (Opus Comics)
- Orphan Black (IDW Publishing)
- The X-Files X-Mas Special (IDW Publishing)
- Star Wars: The Force Unleashed (Dark Horse Comics)
- Jurassic Park Adult Coloring Book Graphic Novel (Dark Horse Comics)
- Afterburn (Red 5 Comics)
- F.V.Z.A. (Radical Comics)
- Ryder On The Storm (Radical Comics)
- Echoes: An Inktober Tribute Collection (Wayne Nichols Comics)
