= Mandy Ord =

Australian artist (born 1974)

- Born: 1974 (age 51–52); Sydney, NSW
- Education: Bachelor of Visual Arts, Australian National University (ANU) Canberra School of Art, Canberra, ACT
- Known for: Illustrator/Cartoonist

Mandy Ord (born 1974) is a Melbourne-based comic artist. Her work has appeared in The Age, Meanjin, The Australian Rationalist magazine, Voiceworks, Tango, Going Down Swinging and Red Leaves / 紅葉. Since 2009 Ord has also had a regular comic strip published in Trouble (magazine). In 2004, she was nominated for the Ledger Award for Small Press Title of the Year for her comic Dirty Little Creep.

Ord's earliest published work was in her own book Wilnot in 1994. Her first graphic novel was a collaboration with Amber Carvan, Brick Dog and Other Stories 2002, followed by her first solo graphic novel Rooftops 2007, published by Findlay Lloyd. Ord is also the author of minicomics Ordinary Eyeball (2006) and Sensitive Creatures (2004).

Ord's book, When One Person Dies the Whole World Is Over, was longlisted for the 2020 Stella Prize.

== Works ==
- Brick Dog and Other Stories co-author with Amber Carvan (2002)
- Rooftops: A graphic novel (2007)
- Sensitive Creatures (2nd Ed, 2011)
- NY: A graphic story (2013)
- Chalk Boy, illustrator, (2018)
- Galápagos (2018)
- When One Person Dies the Whole World Is Over (2019)
