= Total Girl =

Australian children's magazine

- Categories: Tween girls
- Frequency: Monthly
- Publisher: Nuclear Media
- Founded: 2002
- Country: Australia
- Based in: Sydney
- Language: English
- Website: www.totalgirl.com.au
- ISSN: 1839-0471

Total Girl is a monthly Australian tween girls magazine, the magazine targeting girl age 6-13 years. The magazine was launched in 2002.

The magazine focuses on fashion and celebrities and offers information about the latest entertainment and feature stories on current issues and events.

== See also ==
- K-Zone
- List of magazines in Australia
