= Dillon Naylor =

- Born: 1968 (age 57–58)
- Occupations: Cartoonist, Illustrator, Toy designer
- Years active: 2001 - present
- Notable work: Batrisha the Vampire Girl, Rock 'n' Roll Fairies, Da 'n' Dill

Dillon Naylor (born 1968) is an Australian cartoonist, illustrator and toy designer. He is the creator of the comic strip Batrisha the Vampire Girl, which appeared for six years in the children's magazine K-Zone and was the basis for two children's books. Other comic strips include Rock 'n' Roll Fairies which appeared in the children's magazine Total Girl, and Camilla and Mike which appears in the educational magazine Challenge.

Naylor's comic series published through his own publishing imprint Cowtown Comics have included Da 'n' Dill (a long-running showbag insert, and a newspaper strip in the Sydney Sun-Herald from 2001 to 2008), Pop Culture & Two Minute Noodles and the official Martin & Molloy comic. Naylor's extensive work in designing and illustrating music posters includes work for the Beastie Boys and the Fireballs. He provided cover art and a comic book for Satellite's debut album, Wicked Wanda (1995).

Naylor has released a graphic novel collection of his early horror and rock 'n' roll art, A Brush With Darkness, and a collection of his Da 'n' Dill showbag comics, both through Australian publisher, Milk Shadow Books.

Naylor's artistic influences include the work of Carl Barks (creator of Scrooge McDuck) and Hergé (creator of The Adventures of Tintin), and the classic horror comic anthologies published by EC Comics.

Naylor lives in Melbourne, Victoria, Australia. He is married and has two children.

== Selected works ==
- Naylor, Dillon. The strange exchange student (Batrisha book). Rowville, Victoria : Five Mile Press, 2003. ISBN 1-74124-042-5
- Naylor, Dillon. The slippery shadow (Batrisha book). Rowville, Victoria : Five Mile Press, 2003. ISBN 1-74124-041-7
- Naylor, Dillon. Da 'n' Dill - The Showbag Years. Milk Shadow Books, 2013. ISBN 978-0-9874976-1-1
- Naylor, Dillon. Batrisha and the Creepy Caretaker. Margate Beach, Qld.: Comicoz, 2021. ISBN 978-0-9943623-5-3
- Naylor, Dillon (with Ian C. Thomas) Rock 'N' Roll Fairies: the complete graphic novel. Margate Beach, Qld.: Comicoz, 2023. ISBN 978-0-9806535-4-0
