= Black House Comics =

Australian independent comic book publisher

- Founded: 2008
- Founder: Baden Kirgan
- Country of origin: Australia
- Headquarters location: Sydney, New South Wales
- Key people: Baden Kirgan, Christopher Sequeira, Phil Cornell, Dave Elsey, Paul Mason, Bruce Mutard, Jason Franks, Jason Fischer, Jason Paulos
- Publication types: Comics, Graphic Novels, Pulp Fiction
- Fiction genres: Fantasy, science fiction, crime, horror
- Official website: Official website

Black House Comics was an Australian independent comic book and graphic novel publisher. Publisher Baden Kirgan started the company in 2008 when he decided to create an "Australia Vertigo" comics arm within his commercially successful printing company—Jeffries Printing Services. The original idea was to publish dark stories within multiple genres in a quality print product. Black House Comics' signature title was The Dark Detective: Sherlock Holmes.

The books were distributed in Australia to newsagents through Gordon and Gotch, and internationally via the Black House Comics online distribution arm blackboox.net.

Black House Comics ceased trading in 2014, although many of its titles continue to be published either independently or by other companies.

== Comics Books ==
=== The Dark Detective: Sherlock Holmes ===
This ongoing original series is set in Victorian England and features the world's most famous detective. The stories redefine gothic Victoriana with their fusion of the traditional Sherlock Holmes character and world with 1960’s British Hammer House of Horror supernatural style stories, The creators are lifelong Sherlock Holmes aficionados. There are currently seven comic books on offer, and many more scheduled to be published. Writer: Christopher Sequeira. Artist: Phil Cornell. Cover Artist: Dave Elsey. Published: 2008 - 2012.

=== Eeek! ===
Eeek! is an ongoing all Australian retro-horror anthology series in the spirit of the black and white comics magazines published in the USA during the 1950s, 60s and 70s. There are currently five comic books in print with additional ones scheduled for publication in 2012 and beyond. The first five books are also published in graphic novel format. Writer / Artist: Jason Paulos. Cover Artist: Jason Paulos. Published: 2010 - 2012.

=== Pay Through the Soul ===
This anthology collection of satirical web cartoon strips about Cloud Bitch and several other unique characters from a parallel universe comment on the state of our world and our social relationships. Writer / Artist: M Emery. Published: 2011.

=== The Soldier Legacy ===
This ongoing series follows a Digger serving in the New Guinea jungle during World War II who dons a mask and takes on "The Soldier" superhero persona to honour a fallen friend who died saving his life. It also follows the Digger's grandson in modern times who has donned his grandfather's mask to fight a different war against the rising gang activity and street violence in the suburbs. There are currently three issues available, and others scheduled for publication. Writer / Artist: Paul Mason. Published: 2011 - 2012.

=== The Twilight Age ===
This five-part miniseries is about an FBI agent, Justin Barnett, on the trail of the vicious blood-drinking serial killer dubbed "Dracula" by the press and the public. The story takes place during a plague that spreads around the world destroying humanity. Writer / Artist: Jan Scherpenhuizen. Published: 2008 - 2009.

== Graphic novels ==
=== Criminal Element ===
This anthology features ten stories about crimes and the criminals who commit them, and includes stories of gangsters, demons, burglars, nurses, hitmen, saboteurs, slavers, and bounty hunters. Editor: Jason Franks. Writers: Various. Artists: Various. Cover Artist: Jason Paulos. Published: 2012.

=== The Dark Detective: Sherlock Holmes ===
The first book in this upcoming graphic novel collection collects the first four issues of the comic book series. Writer: Christopher Sequeira. Artist: Phil Cornell. Cover Artist: Dave Elsey. Published: 2011.

=== Eeek! Volume 2 ===
This graphic novel collects the first five comic books in the series. Volume 1 is published by Asylum Press in the USA. Writer: Jason Paulos. Artist: Jason Paulos and other contributors. Cover Artist: Jason Paulos. Published: 2012.

=== The Guzumo Show ===
This satirical comic strip collection examines how racism, sexism, homophobia, religion, politics, misogyny and misanthropy perpetuate the modern social landscape, and how ridiculous human beings can be. Writer / Artist: M Emery Published: 2010

=== McBlack ===
Set in a dystopian sci-fi world, this is the story of Whiteface McBlack, a former private dick – as well as a ghost, part demon and complete psychopath – who gave up his old life to pursue his true calling—murder, sabotage, theft and arson. Writer / Artist: Jason Franks. Published: 2011.

=== A Mind of Love ===
This graphic novel centres on an adult book store clerk's obsession with a waitress, and is an exploration of how modern men have harnessed technology and porn to gratify their lust at the expense of their humanity. Writer / Artist: Bruce Mutard. Published: 2010.

== Magazines ==
=== Terra ===
This is a triannual newsstand magazine featuring serialised stories by many of Australia's most talented comics creators, which brings together a diverse range of science fiction, fantasy, horror and crime stories. Editor: Jason Franks. Contributors: Various. Published: 2012.

== Pulp Fiction Novellas ==
=== After the World ===
This series of novellas is set in a post zombie-apocalypse universe. Each novella is self-contained but part of the same universe. Titles include: Killable Hours, Gravesend, Corpus Christi, Army Corpse, and the anthology Pack Rules. Writers: Jason Fischer, Clay Blakehills, Jason Franks and others. Cover Artist: Jason Paulos. Published: 2010 - 2012.

== Media ==
The Soldier Legacy appeared in a Youi Insurance commercial, which began screening on Australian television in October 2011.

Black House Comics publisher Baden Kirgan appeared as a judge on Beauty and the Geek Australia in a superhero costuming challenge. The segment aired on 27 October 2011.

== Other ==
The Dark Detective: Sherlock Holmes cover artist Dave Elsey won an Academy Award in 2011 for Best Special Effects Makeup for The Wolfman.

Jason Paulos was nominated for an Aurealis Award for Best Illustrated Book or Graphic Novel in 2010 for Eeek! Weird Tales of Suspense.

Black House Comics was one of the sponsors of the inaugural Australian Society of Authors (ASA) Comics Masterclass, featuring Colleen Doran, which was held in Sydney in November 2011.
