= Patrick Alexander (cartoonist) =

Australian cartoonist

- Born: Western Australia, Australia
- Occupations: Cartoonist, writer, artist, publisher, designer
- Writing career
- Pen name: PA, Patch, Panic
- Genres: humour, gag humour
- Website: chickennation.com

Patrick Alexander, sometimes going by the alias Reid, is an Australian cartoonist. Though known for comics such as Raymondo Person, The Wraith, Pink Chickens, Mania, Krash, and AAAAAAAH, Alexander has also collaborated on various Dark Horse Comics publications.

== Career ==
Alexander is known for his creations, Raymondo Person, The Wraith, Pink Chickens, which ran for thirteen issues of the Australian kids magazine, Mania from 2001 until 2002 before being replaced by Tobias & Jube which continued in the kids magazine, Krash between 2005 and 2006. Alexander then moved to Sydney and was employed as a deputy editor for Total Gamer.

Alexander then was employed by Eegra, a video gaming website, to produce a weekly webcomic.

In 2011 a copy of Alexander's AAAAAAAH received a degree of popularity at the Dark Horse Comics offices, which led the publisher Mike Richardson to engage him to work for them. Alexander's creations have appeared in Dark Horse Presents #1 (April 2011 -AAAAAAAH and Personally Quiz), #2 (June 2011 - The Wraith); #3 (August 2011 - Indecisive Man) and #4 (September 2011 - Teenagers). Alexander has described The Wraith as a character "partly based on Othello, although with some changes and additions". More recently his works were included in Dark Horse Presents #22 (March 2012 - Villianman); #26 (July 2013 - Steggy Wilmot and Spimps); #28 (September 2013 - Mrs Plopsworth's Kitchen) which is described as "somehow manages to be adorable and disturbing at the same time, although words like 'surreal', 'endearing', 'hilarious', and 'grotesque' could apply as well."; and #36 (May 2013 - Bunbun and Sadhead and Job Interview).

More recently Alexander has done Australian political comics, including for Crikey, and a piece, You Can't Waste Your Vote!, explaining the Australian preferential voting system.
