= Darren Close =

Australian comics creator

Darren Close is an Australian comics creator. He has primarily self-published comics about his character Killeroo for the last 20 years, most recently the GANGWARS anthology He also founded the OzComics website, which later became a weekly drawing challenge on Facebook. Among other achievements, the website held an auction to raise funds to help Gary Friedrich, co-creator of the supernatural motorcyclist, Ghost Rider, after he was countersued by publisher Marvel when he tried to regain rights to the character.
