= Keith Chatto =

Australian illustrator and cartoonist (1924–1992)

- Born: Ronald Keith Chatto; 1924; Kogarah, New South Wales, Australia
- Died: 22 October 1992 (aged 67–68)
- Occupations: Cartoonist, writer, illustrator
- Writing career
- Genres: Adventure, crime, westerns, Pulp Fiction

Ronald Keith Chatto (1924 – 22 October 1992) was an Australian comic book artist and writer. He was the first Australian illustrator to draw a full-length episode of The Phantom comic.

== Biography ==
Keith Chatto was born at Kogarah, New South Wales in 1924, the son of an accountancy clerk. Chatto was educated at Kogarah Primary School, Canterbury High School and Sydney Grammar School. His father, an accountant for Smith's Weekly, showed his son's sketches to the art staff at the magazine, where he was invited by Jim Russell to attend weekly art classes. On leaving school Chatto found work with the art department of Greater Union Theatres then drawing aircraft recognition charts for the Australian Air Training Corps before enlisting with the RAAF.

Following his demobilisation in 1946 he had his first comic strip published, Destiny Scott, in the mid-week children's section of the Sydney Morning Herald on 26 June 1946. Also, in 1947, Chatto produced two comic strips for a nudist magazine, The Australian Sunbather, which was published by Ashworth Publications. When Destiny Scott ended he contributed to the All-Australian Comics group on Bunny Allen, The Glamour Girl and The Buccaneer.

He had an eye for a good line and a very good talent at drawing women. Some of his strips, like Glamour Girl and Wanda Dare, were good examples of his art. I don't mean to say he was a 'perv', or anything like that, but he captured women well.

— Jim Russell

In 1949 Chatto created The Lone Wolf for Atlas Publications, which was later drawn by Yaroslav Horak, and in 1954 created Steven Carlisle for Larry Cleland Publishing Company. By 1955 Chatto branched out to other forms of commercial art including magazine illustrations, record sleeves and cover illustrations for pulp fiction novels, where in the 1950s he was produced upwards of six covers a week. He also worked on The Twilight Ranger and El Lobo at Cleveland Publishing.

I began working exclusively for Cleveland Publishing Company, at first illustrating and designing pocket book covers. At one period about this time, I was producing an average of six full colour covers each and every week for various publishers. [Jack Atkins] commissioned me to illustrate a radio serial written by Michael Noonan, called The Twilight Ranger. I had to adapt for the comic book Michael's scripts and illustrate them.

— Keith Chatto

With the introduction of television Chatto left the comic book industry to become a freelance film producer and cine cameraman. He continued to work in the comics field on a part-time basis drawing comic book covers for Page Publications and a series of Skippy comics in 1967. Unfortunately the comic book was produced after the television series had peaked in popularity. In mid 1977 he began drawing the Sunday version of Air Hawk and the Flying Doctors, having previously ghosted the strip for a short period in 1972.

In 1990 saw the publication of the first Australian-written and drawn full-length Phantom story, Rumble in the Jungle, with Chatto providing the illustrations and Jim Shepherd the storyline. Chatto followed this by illustrating two more Phantom stories, Return of the Singh Brotherhood and The Kings Cross Connection in 1992, again collaborations with Shepherd.

Chatto died of cancer on 22 October 1992 at the age of 67.
