= Inverloch (webcomic) =

Webcomic by Sarah Ellerton

- Volume 1
- Author: Sarah Ellerton
- Website: https://www.seraph-inn.com/inverloch.html
- Current status/schedule: Complete
- Launch date: 2003
- End date: 2007
- Publisher: Seven Seas Entertainment (dropped)
- Genre: Fantasy

Inverloch is a series of five fantasy graphic novels authored by Sarah Ellerton drawn in a cel-shaded manga style. Inverloch was initially published as a webcomic with new content introduced several pages at a time from 2003 to 2007. Three volumes have seen print with the first three volumes currently available from IndyPlanet and with the first two originally published by Seven Seas Entertainment. Inverloch received several nominations in the 2005, 2006 and 2007 Web Cartoonists' Choice Awards, winning the Outstanding Fantasy Comic category in 2005. During its web publication Inverloch was highly rated at both Topwebcomics and buzzComix online comic rating sites.

The story of Inverloch follows the journey of Acheron and his companions to find the whereabouts of the elf Kayn'dar. It was scripted in December 2003, although it was constantly edited and refined throughout its production.

== Background, production and style ==
=== Background ===
Inverloch author Sarah Ellerton was already an experienced artist before she began the project, and says she chose to create a webcomic as a means of improving her art. Ellerton wrote out the script for the entire comic ahead of time, in December 2003, as a five-volume series. She began illustrating the comic in June 2004, updating twice a week with several new pages uploaded per update, and finished the comic in 2007.

After finishing Inverloch, Ellerton began work on a second webcomic (the plot and setting of which are unrelated to those of Inverloch), called The Phoenix Requiem. That comic, like Inverloch, consists of five volumes and has a total of 800 pages; the last page was published on March 17, 2011.

=== Production ===
To create each page of Inverloch, Ellerton planned out the panels with sketches on paper and then drew and colored them in Adobe Photoshop using a Wacom graphics tablet. She drew each panel individually, rearranging, resizing, and organizing them in Photoshop. Each page is in book format, and the size and shapes of the panels within each page varies.

Volume 1 of Inverloch was published in print form on May 15, 2006. Ellerton redrew the first five pages for the published version, saying that the artistic style had changed since those pages were originally produced. Volume 2 was published on November 15, 2006.

== Synopsis ==
=== Volume 1 ===
Inverloch is set in a high fantasy world with three known races, all of which typically live separately and are at odds with one another: humans, elves, and da'kor. Da'kor are anthropomorphic animals with elements of goats and wolves, standing about four feet tall in adulthood but decidedly more dangerous in a fight than humans.

The story begins when Acheron, a young da'kor, forms an unlikely friendship with Shiara, an elf. When Shiara reveals to him that her childhood love, Kayn'dar, disappeared twelve years earlier, Acheron promises to find him for her. When he explains to his mother that he will be leaving, it becomes apparent to him that his mother, brother, and uncle all know something about Kayn'dar, but are unwilling to tell him. Before leaving, Acheron also visits his uncle Selak, who gives him a pendant that was once owned by Kayn'dar.

=== Volume 2 ===
Acheron first sets out to find Lei'ella, an elven woman whom one of the da'kor says can help him find Kayn'dar. While searching for her in the human town of Strathwood, he is assaulted by Berard, a human criminal who captures da'kor to use in gladiatorial fighting rings. At that moment Lei'ella appears and rescues him, after which he explains his goal and she agrees to join him. From there they travel to Rhyll, where Acheron catches a thief named Varden trying to steal from him; Varden claims that he must now serve Acheron, according to the "thieves' code," and Acheron allows him to join their group. At Lei'ella's suggestion, they go to Aydensfell, a city inhabited by humans who have traces of elven blood and study magic. The Archmage of Aydensfell tells Acheron that he should seek someone named Silvah, rather than Kayn'dar, and allows a young mage named Neirren to join them.

=== Volume 3 ===
The group then travels to a city called Muirfold to search for Silvah. In the city they split up to ask about his whereabouts, and Acheron is captured by Berard, who had been following them. To rescue Acheron and prevent Berard from following them in the future, Varden approaches Berard and requests to fight Acheron in the gladiatorial ring. There, Varden wounds Acheron with a poisoned blade to make him appear dead, and kills Berard. They then take Acheron out of the city, where he eventually reawakens.

=== Volume 4 ===
From there, the group finds an old watchtower and enters it, ultimately finding Silvah, a white-haired elf, inside. Silvah explains to them that Kayn'dar had been killed, and that he is living in the watchtower to perfect his magical abilities in order to avenge Kayn'dar. The group leaves the watchtower, and then Lei'ella explains to the group that because Silvah is a white-haired and golden-eyed elf like her but can still use magic (whereas Lei'ella, like most elves of that variety, has no magical abilities), then "Silvah" must be Kayn'dar, since before disappearing Kayn'dar had been famous as the only white-haired elf to possess magical powers. They return to the watchtower to confront Silvah, and Lei'ella accuses him of throwing away the only hope for elves such as themselves. Angered, and worried about his secret getting out, Silvah stabs Lei'ella, and then flees with Raul, the former archmage who is now involved in Silvah's plan. Acheron is able to heal Lei'ella using Kayn'dar's pendant, which possesses the memories and spirit of Kayn'dar.

Once recovered, Lei'ella explains to the group that both she and Kayn'dar are "severed elves": elves who were born without their connection to nature, and thus are mortal like humans and unable to use magic. Kayn'dar, however, was able to use magic as a child, and thus had been seen as a savior for the severed elves.

=== Volume 5 ===
The group returns to Aydensfell, the city of mages, and the Archmage explains to them that the kidnapping of Kayn'dar had, in fact, been orchestrated by himself and Raul, as an attempt to learn more about elven healing magic. When the experiment had failed, Raul and "Silvah," the personality that inhabited Kayn'dar's body, had left and become reclusive. Acheron, Lei'ella, Varden, and Neirren decide to go back to the forest of Inverloch and seek aid from the elves. They determine that, if there is a way to overcome Silvah and restore Kayn'dar's soul, they will first have to get him away from Raul's influence.

In the forest, Lei'ella soon feels the presence of Raul, alone, and Neirren goes out to face him, telling the rest of the group to continue on without her. They go on and find Silvah at the ruins of Inverloch, preparing a spell that will sever all elves from nature. Also at the ruins is Shiara, powerless to stop Silvah. Together, they begin to fight Silvah, hoping to wear him down to the point that he is unable to cast the spell. Meanwhile, Neirren defeats Raul, and before he dies she absorbs his memories and knowledge into herself. She goes to where the others are fighting Silvah, and helps Silvah kill Acheron.

When Acheron dies, Silvah suddenly stops fighting, and collapses. When he awakens, he identifies himself as Kayn'dar, and has all of Acheron's memories. He reveals to the others the details of his kidnapping twelve years before: Raul had, as an experiment, caused Kayn'dar's spirit and the spirit of Silvah, a da'kor, to exchange bodies. Kayn'dar's spirit had entered Silvah's body and become Acheron. Silvah, the da'kor whose spirit had taken Kayn'dar's body, desired revenge against the elves who had killed his father, which is why he had ultimately desired to sever all the elves. When he killed Acheron, Silvah's spirit had also died, allowing Kayn'dar's spirit to return to its elven body and thus restoring Kayn'dar.

With Silvah and Raul dead, the group retires to the elven city. Varden and Lei'ella eventually leave for Muirfold to start a life together, and Neirren, armed with Raul's knowledge, returns to Aydensfell to pursue her magical studies. Shiara is, at first, angry at Kayn'dar for killing Acheron, for whom she had had strong feelings, but eventually realizes Kayn'dar still is Acheron.

== Translations ==
- Inverloch has been translated into eight languages: Finnish, French, Polish, Spanish, Arabic, Italian, German and Russian.

== Reception ==
In a review of the first Inverloch volume, IGN's A.E. Sparrow stated that Inverloch is "a great story that I'm sure I'll be reading and re-reading for some time, both online and in print," rating the book a "must have".

Inverloch has been nominated for a large number of Web Cartoonists' Choice Awards, winning three awards. In 2005, Inverloch won the "Outstanding Fantasy Comic" category, tying with The Order of the Stick. In 2006, Inverloch was nominated in twelve categories, winning the "Outstanding Long Form Comic" award. In 2007, Inverloch tied with Gunnerkrigg Court, winning in the "Outstanding Environment Design" category.

== Books ==
- Ellerton, Sarah (May 15, 2006). Inverloch: Volume 1. Seven Seas Entertainment. ISBN 1-933164-13-1.
- Ellerton, Sarah (November 15, 2006). Inverloch: Volume 2. Seven Seas Entertainment. ISBN 1-933164-27-1.

== Notes ==
Preceded by Count Your Sheep	Web Cartoonists' Choice Awards: Outstanding Fantasy Comic; 2005	Succeeded by The Order of the Stick
Preceded by Alpha Shade	Web Cartoonists' Choice Awards: Outstanding Long Form Comic; 2006	Succeeded by The Order of the Stick
Preceded by Copper	Web Cartoonists' Choice Awards: Outstanding Environment Design; 2007	Succeeded by Girl Genius
