= Bernard Caleo =

Bernard Caleo (born Melbourne, 25 May 1968 (age 58)) is a Melbourne-based Australia comic artist, comic book editor, performer, and presenter.

== Background ==
He worked part-time at the Melbourne Museum for fifteen years as a public programs officer running activities and performances.

== Comics and performance ==
He was the editor of Tango, a comics anthology series which was published irregularly from 1997 to 2009. He also runs Cardigan Comics, the publishing company which publishes Tango. As a comic artist, Caleo contributes to Tango, as well as producing a webcomic called "I Knew Him". Collaborating with Erica Wagner and Elizabeth MacFarlane, Caleo began the Publishing enterprise 'Twelve Panels Press', which translated and published Jan Bauer's graphic novel 'The Salty River' in 2015.

He is also the author of the comics Yell Ole!, later called False Impressionists (Bernard Caleo and Brendan Tolley, Imaginate, 1993-), Café Ghetto (Bernard Caleo and John Murphy, Santa Madonna Publications, 1998–2000), and Caleo & Khandekar's homage to Hergé : the element of surprise (Bernard Caleo and Khandekar, Polluxman, 1996). In 2009, Caleo contributed comic work to the Melbourne incarnation of Super Heroes and Schlemiels: Jews and Comic Art which appeared at the Jewish Museum of Australia in Melbourne.

The play The Great Game by Katherine Connolly, in which Caleo portrayed Frederick Baranaby, 'the strongest man in the British Empire' played in Melbourne at La Mama Theatre in 2014. He played English scientist Michael Faraday for Faraday’s Candle, a one-man show for CSIRO in 2011/12. In 2008, Caleo and collaborator Bruce Woolley wrote and performed Miracleman, a stage adaptation of the Alan Moore Marvelman comic series.

== Film ==
In 2012, collaborating with filmmaker Daniel Hayward, Caleo made a feature documentary called Graphic Novels! Melbourne! focussing on the long-form comics work of Nicki Greenberg, Mandy Ord, Pat Grant and Bruce Mutard. It premiered in a laneway in Carlton in November 2012 and at the Angoulême International Comics Festival in France in February 2013.

== Awards ==
- Creative Fellow at the State Library of Victoria, 2014
- Melbourne Fringe Festival Award
- Platinum Ledger Award for contributions to Australian comic book culture, 2016
