= 2016 in comics =

Notable events of 2016 in comics. It includes any relevant comics-related events, deaths of notable comics-related people, conventions and first issues by title.

== Events ==
DC Rebirth is a 2016 relaunch by DC Comics of its entire line of ongoing monthly superhero comic books.

=== February ===
- February 25: In The Hague, a statue of Marnix Rueb's comic character Haagse Harry is inaugurated.
- February 28: During the Stripdagen in Rijswijk, Maaike Hartjes wins the Stripschapprijs and publisher Strip2000 wins the P. Hans Frankfurtherprijs. Publishing company VanderHout & Co wins the Bulletje en Boonestaakschaal.

=== April ===
- April 18: Al Jaffee makes the Guinness Book of Records for being the oldest active cartoonist in the world.

=== May ===
- May 3: Iranian cartoonist Atena Farghadani, jailed in 2014 over a cartoon offending the Iranian government, is finally released from prison thanks to international sympathy campaigns for her cause.
- May 13: French cartoonist Piem is named Commander in the Ordre National du Mérite.

=== June ===
- June 3–12 For the first time the Stripdagen in Haarlem lasts a week, rather than just a weekend.

=== July ===
- July 27: Belgian comic artist Marc Sleen receives the Honorary Sign of the Flemish Community.
- Image comic Morning Glories by Nick Spencer and Joe Eisma concludes its second season and goes on hiatus following the publication of issue #50.

=== August ===
- Cancellation of the Dutch children's and comics magazine Taptoe

=== September ===
- September 27: Dutch cartoonist Peter van Straaten wins his fifth Inktspotprijs for Best Political Cartoon.
- September 28: DC Comics writer Greg Rucka confirms that Wonder Woman is canonically bisexual. This makes her the first U.S. superhero to be officially bisexual.

=== October ===
- Artist Fred Dewilde publishes Mon Bataclan, a personal account of the November 2015 Paris attacks, which he experienced firsthand at the Bataclan Theatre in Paris, nearly one year earlier.

=== November ===
- Dutch journalist/comic artist Robin Vinck and publisher Seb van der Kaaden launch the Stripjournaal Podcast, a news podcast on which they discuss and interview people and events regarding the Dutch-Belgian comic industry.

=== Specific date unknown ===
- Julia Gfrörer publishes her graphic novel Laid Waste.
- Caricaturist and illustrator Edward Sorel releases his graphic novel Mary Astor's Purple Diary: The Great American Sex Scandal of 1936, about Hollywood actress Mary Astor.
- French comic writer Jean-David Morvan and South Korean artist Kim Jung Gi publish the biographical graphic novel McCurry, NYC, 911 about photojournalist Steve McCurry.

== Exhibitions ==
- January 28–April 17: "Our Comics Ourselves: Identity, Expression, and Representation in Comic Art", Interference Archive (Brooklyn, New York) — artists include Cathy Guisewite, Julie Doucet, Kelly Sue DeConnick, Phoebe Gloeckner, Sheri S. Tepper, Carol Tyler, and Leela Corman; exhibition later toured to George Mason University and the Thomas J. Dodd Research Center on the University of Connecticut, Storrs Campus
- March 2–May 7: "The ZAP Show: A Cultural Revolution", Society of Illustrators (New York City) — featuring the work of R. Crumb, S. Clay Wilson, Robert Williams, Victor Moscoso, Spain Rodriguez, Rick Griffin, and Paul Mavrides; curated by Monte Beauchamp

== Conventions ==
- January 26–31: Angoulême International Comics Festival (Angoulême, France)
- April 23: FLUKE Mini-Comics & Zine Festival (40 Watt, Athens, Georgia)
- March 5: New York Comic Book Marketplace (Penn Plaza Pavilion, New York City)
- March 5–6: STAPLE! (Marchesa Hall and Theater, Austin, Texas)
- March 18–20: Chicago Comic & Entertainment Expo (McCormick Place Complex, Chicago, Illinois)
- March 24–26: Salt Lake Comic Con FanXperience (Salt Palace Convention Center, Salt Lake City, Utah)
- March 25–27: WonderCon Los Angeles (Los Angeles Convention Center, Los Angeles, California)
- May 26–29: MegaCon (Orange County Convention Center, Orlando, Florida)
- April 2–3: MoCCA Arts Festival (Metropolitan West, New York City)
- April 7–10: Emerald City Comicon (Washington State Convention Center, Seattle, Washington)
- April 9–10: Small Press and Alternative Comics Expo (Northland Performing Arts Center, Columbus, Ohio)
- April 14-16: International Comic Arts Forum (University of South Carolina, Columbia, South Carolina) — guests include Cece Bell, Michael Chaney, Howard Cruse, Dominique Goblet, Sanford Green, Gary Jackson, and Keith Knight
- April 16–17: East Coast Comicon (Meadowlands Exposition Center, Meadowlands, New Jersey)
- April 23: FLUKE Mini-Comics & Zine Festival (40 Watt, Athens, Georgia)
- May 14–15: Toronto Comic Arts Festival (Toronto Reference Library, Toronto, Canada)
- May 13–15: Motor City Comic Con (Suburban Collection Showplace, Novi, Michigan)
- May 14: Comica Comiket: The Independent Comics Market (House of Illustration, London, England) — part of "Comica London Weekender"; features the "drawing parade" Cavalcade of Celebrity Cartoonists
- May 21: East Coast Black Age of Comics Convention (The Enterprise Center, Philadelphia, Pennsylvania)
- June 2–5: Phoenix Comicon (Phoenix Convention Center, Phoenix, Arizona)
- June 3–5: Fan Expo Dallas (Kay Bailey Hutchison Convention Center, Dallas, Texas)
- June 11–12: Chicago Alternative Comics Expo [CAKE] (Center on Halsted, Chicago, Illinois) — special guests: Chester Brown, Tyrell Cannon, Ezra Claytan Daniels, Sammy Harkham, Cathy G. Johnson, Patrick Kyle, Laura Park, Trina Robbins, Leslie Stein
- June 17–19: Heroes Convention (Charlotte Convention Center, Charlotte, North Carolina)
- June 18–19: St. Louis Comicon (St. Charles Convention Center, St Louis, Missouri)
- July 21–24: San Diego Comic-Con (San Diego Convention Center, San Diego, California)
- July 29–31: Wizard World Columbus (Greater Columbus Convention Center, Columbus, Ohio)
- August 24–27: Wizard World Chicago (Donald E. Stephens Convention Center, Rosemont, Illinois)
- September 2–5: Dragon Con (Atlanta, Georgia)
- September 2–4: Baltimore Comic-Con (Baltimore Convention Center, Baltimore, Maryland)
- September 17–18: Small Press Expo (Bethesda North Marriott Hotel & Conference Center, North Bethesda, Maryland)
- September 24–25: Rhode Island Independent Publishing Expo (RIPE) (Providence Public Library, Providence, RI) — third iteration of this event
- October 6–9: New York Comic Con (Jacob K. Javits Convention Center, New York City)
- October 8–9: Alternative Press Expo (San Jose Convention Center, San Jose, California)
- October 8: Comica Comiket (The Lightbox, Woking, Surrey, England) — Drawing Parade; guests include Peter Hampson, son of Frank Hampson
- October 13–16: Cartoon Crossroads Columbus (CXC) (Columbus, Ohio) — special guests Bruce Worden, Derf Backderf, Garry Trudeau, Sergio Aragonés, Raina Telgemeier, Nate Beeler, Charles Burns, Ann Telnaes, Ronald Wimberly, Stan Sakai, Mark Osborne, Keith Knight, Julia Gfrörer, Lalo Alcaraz, John Canemaker, Brandon Graham, Jay Hosler, Ben Katchor, Ed Koren, Sacha Mardou, Seth, Carol Tyler, Scottie Young
- October 28–30: Comikaze Expo (Los Angeles Convention Center)
- October 29–30: Massachusetts Independent Comics Expo [MICE] (Lesley's University Hall, Porter Square, Cambridge, Massachusetts)
- November 2–3: WES Feminist Comic Con (Forman Christian College, Lahore, Pakistan) — first annual event
- November 5: CAB/Comic Arts Brooklyn (Our Lady of Mt. Carmel Church & Wythe Hotel, Brooklyn, New York)
- November 11–13: Rhode Island Comic Con (Rhode Island Convention Center, Providence, Rhode Island)
- December 3–4: Comic Arts Los Angeles (Think Tank Gallery, Los Angeles, California) — featured guests: Sam Bosma, Matt Furie

== Deaths ==
=== January ===
- January 2: Zdravko Zupan, Serbian comics artist (Zuzuko, Munja, Disney comics) dies at age 65.
- January 11: Franco Oneta, Italian comics artist (Zembla) dies at age 82.
- January 14: Shaolin, Brazilian TV comedian and cartoonist, dies at age 44 from a heart attack after being involved in a car accident.
- January 17: Hansrudi Wäscher, Swiss-German comics artist (Sigurd, Akim, Tibor) dies at age 87.
- January 19: Mike Docherty, Scottish comics artist and animator (worked on Conan the Barbarian), dies at age 60.
- January 21: Willem Dolphyn, Belgian comics artist (Jan Zonder Vrees), dies at age 80.
- January 26: Bernard Cookson, British cartoonist (Punch), dies from cancer at age 79.
- January 29: Linus Maurer, American cartoonist and comics artist (Old Harrigan, Abracadabra), dies at age 90.

=== February ===
- February 1: Antoon Mortier, Belgian painter and comic artist, dies at age 96.
- February 2: Bob Elliott, American comedian (Bob & Ray) and comics writer (Mad Magazine), dies at age 92.
- February 3: Jack Elrod, American comics artist (Mark Trail, continued The Ryatts), dies at age 91.
- February 8: Piet Zeeman, Dutch comics writer, editor and translator (Disney comics, wrote for Sjors & Sjimmie, Jan, Jans en de Kinderen), dies at age 58.
- February 21: John Caldwell, American gag cartoonist (Mad), dies at age 69.
- February 23: Angel Gabriele, American comics artist and publisher (Space Giants), dies at age 59.
- February: Alvin Buenaventura, American comic book publisher (Buenaventura Press and Pigeon Press), dies at age 39.

=== March ===
- March 5: Alberto Dose, Argentine comics artist (El Cimmarón), dies at age 68.
- March 7:
  - Scott Goodall, British comic book writer (Fishboy), dies at age 80.
  - Paul C. Ryan, American comics artist (Marvel Comics), dies at age 65.
- March 15: Augie Scotto, American comics artist (worked for Charlton Comics, Cross Publications, Hillman Comics, New Heroic Comics, Timely Comics, PS Magazine and DC Comics), dies at age 88.
- March 16: He Youzhi, Chinese comics artist, dies as age 94.
- March 18: Klaus Vonderwerth, German cartoonist and comics artist (Albert, Ako, Kybert, Ruf 110), dies at age 80.
- March 25: Ken Barr, Scottish cover painter and occasional interior artist of American comics and comic magazines, dies at age 83.

=== April ===
- April 2: Gallieno Ferri, Italian comics artist (Zagor) dies at age 87.
- April 3: Dick Hodgins, Jr., American comics artist (Half Hitch, continued Henry), dies at age 85.
- April 6: Oto Reisinger, Croatian animator, illustrator, cartoonist and comics artist (Štefekove pustolovine) dies at age 89.
- April 8: William Hamilton, American cartoonist and playwright (The New Yorker), dies at age 76.
- April 8: Paul Fung Jr., American comics artist (Continued Blondie), dies at age 93.
- April 19: Frits Klein, Dutch comics artist (Bokke Heidehipper, Gurbe), dies at age 91.
- April 21: Siem Praamsma, Dutch comics artist (Humpo Hotsflots, Jochem Jofel), dies at age 95.
- April 27: William Hamilton, American cartoonist (The New Yorker), is killed in a car accident at age 76.
- April 27: V.T. Thomas, aka Toms, Indian comics artist (Boban and Molly), dies at age 86.
- April 28: René Hausman, Belgian comics artist (Lalyna), dies at age 80.
- April 29: Jok Church, American comics artist (You Can With Beakman and Jax), dies at age 66 from a heart attack.

=== May ===
- May 2: Cleet Boris, French comics artist (Super-Héros) dies at age 53.
- May 5: Siné, French cartoonist (Charlie Hebdo, Siné Mensuel), dies at age 87.
- May 14: Darwyn Cooke, Canadian animator and comics artist (DC Comics), dies of cancer at age 53.
- May 22: George Wildman, American comics artist (Popeye, Disney comics, Hanna-Barbera comics, Warner Bros. comics), dies at age 88.
- May 24: Mell Lazarus, American cartoonist (Miss Peach, Momma), dies at age 89.
- May 26: Julio Berríos, A.K.A. Juber, Chilean comics artist (Hombres en la Jungla, Khanda, El Hijo de la Montaña, Tolák, Taori, Pichinahuel, Firewall, Disney comics), dies at age 84.
- May 27: Frank Modell, American cartoonist (The New Yorker), dies at age 98.

=== June ===
- June 1: Anatol Kovarsky, A.K.A. Akov, Russian-American painter, cartoonist and illustrator (The New Yorker), dies at age 97.
- June 19: Rodolfo Zalla, Argentine-Brazilian comics artist (Jacaré Mendonça, Johnny Pecos), dies at age 85.
- June 22: Peter Chapman, Australian comic artist (worked on The Shadow), dies at age 91.
- June 23: Julio Schiaffino, Argentine comic artist (Choripán, Hot Shot Hamish and Mighty Mouse, assisted on El Eternauta, continued Joe Zunda, El Marcianero and Buster Pike), dies at age 79 or 80.
- June 25: Manfred Deix, Austrian cartoonist and comic strip artist, dies at age 66.
- June 26: Angel Nadal Quirch, Spanish comics artist (Pasquale, Disney comics, Rolf Kauka comics, continued Buster Capp), dies at age 85.
- June 27: Fred Wagner, American comics artist (continued Catfish, Grin and Bear It and Animal Crackers), dies at age 75..

=== July ===
- July 3: Albert Survie, Dutch comics artist (De Vleermuis), dies at age 75.
- July 4: Didier Savard, French comics artist (Dick Hérisson, Léonid Beaudragon), dies at age 65.
- July 5: Nine Culliford, Belgian comic book colourist and wife of Peyo (The Smurfs), dies at age 86.
- July 8: Frank Dickens, British cartoonist (Bristow), dies at age 84.
- July 9: Geneviève Castrée, Canadian cartoonist, illustrator, and musician, dies from pancreatic cancer at age 35.
- July 9: Lothar Dräger, German comics writer (Digedags, Abrafaxe), dies at age 89.
- July 16: Carlos Nine, Argentine comics artist, dies at age 72.
- July 26: Coen van Hunnik, Dutch comics artist (Olle Kapoen), dies at age 90.
- July 27: Jack Davis, American comics artist (Mad), dies at age 91.
- July 27: Brett Merhar, American comics artist (Free For All), dies at age 46.
- July 27: Richard Thompson, American comics artist, (Cul de Sac), dies at age 58.
- July 29: Guy Dessicy, Belgian comic book colorist (Studio Hergé), dies at age 92. He was also head of Publiart, a commercial agency specializing in comic book merchandising and co-founder of the Belgian Comic Strip Center.

=== August ===
- August 4: Gaspar Saladino, American comics letterer (DC Comics), dies at age 88.
- August 7: Jean Sanitas, French writer, journalist and comics writer (Zor et Mlouf, continued Bob Mallard), dies at age 88.
- August 17: Víctor Mora, Spanish comic book writer (Capitán Trueno, El Jabato), dies at age 85.
- Specific date in August unknown: Jukka Murtosaari, Finnish animator and comics artist (Jake, Disney comics, worked on Moomins comics), dies at age 53.

=== September ===
- September 7: Sparky Moore, American animator and comics artist (western comics, Disney comics, Zorro, The Big Bad Wolf, continued Scamp, Winnie the Pooh), dies at age 91.
- September 24: Joonas, Finnish comic artist (Joonas, Tooper, Unto Uneksija, Kaista, Hirnu, Oloneuvos, V. Vaivainen, Leo ja Kaverit), dies at age 87.
- September 25: Fernando Puig Rosado, Spanish cartoonist and comics artist, dies at age 85.
- September 30: Ted Benoît, French comics artist (Ray Banana, continued Blake & Mortimer), dies at age 69.

=== October ===
- October 8: Lyn Chevli, American comics artist (co-founder of Tits & Clits Comix), dies at age 84.
- October 10: Carlos Roose Silva, Peruvian comics artist ('Pachochín, el Chupatintas), dies at age 87.
- October 12: Benoît Gillain, Belgian-French comics artist (Bouby, Bonux-Boy), dies at age 78.
- October 22: Steve Dillon, British comics artist (Judge Dredd, Hellblazer), dies at age 54.
- October 23: Jack Chick, American comics artist (Chick tracts), dies at age 92.
- October 27: Ton Beek, Dutch comics artist (Birre Beer) dies at age 90.

=== November ===
- November 1: Dave Broadfoot, Canadian comedian and comics writer (Sergeant Renfrew), dies at age 90.
- November 1: Carlos Alberto Santos, Portuguese comics artist (historical comics), dies at age 73.
- November 4: John Gillatt, British comics artist (Billy's Boots), dies at age 87.
- November 5: Averardo Ciriello, Italian comics artist (erotic comics), dies at age 98.
- November 6: Marc Sleen, Belgian comics artist (The Adventures of Nero, Piet Fluwijn en Bolleke, De Lustige Kapoentjes, Doris Dobbel, Oktaaf Keunink, De Ronde van Frankrijk), dies at age 93.
- November 12: Jerry Dumas, American cartoonist and comics writer (Beetle Bailey, Boner's Ark, Sam and Silo), dies at age 86.
- November 19: Gino Gavioli, Italian comics artist and animator (Vita da Cani, Paco y Manolito), dies at age 93.
- November 22: Alfredo Brasioli, Italian comic artist (Lippi e Lia, Ulix, De Bello Gallico), dies at age 81.
- November 27: Micharmut, Spanish comics artist (Futurama), dies at age 63.

=== December ===
- December 2: Liliana Fantoni, Italian comics artist (collaborator of her father Guido Fantoni and brother Mario Fantoni), dies at age 96.
- December 4: Marcel Gotlib, French comics artist (Gai-Luron, Les Dingodossiers, Superdupont, Rubrique-à-Brac, Hamster Jovial, Pervers Pépère), dies at age 82.
- December 8: Peter van Straaten, Dutch comics artist and political cartoonist (Vader & Zoon), dies at age 81.
- December 15: Christian Lippens, French comic artist (Les Fabuleux Exploits d'Eddy Merckx, assisted on Michel Vaillant, Julie Wood), dies at age 86.
- December 20: Mix & Remix, Swiss cartoonist (L'Hebdo, Siné Hebdo), dies at age 58.
- December 23: Paul Peter Porges, Austrian-American comics artist (Mad Magazine), dies at age 89.
- December 23: Zdenko Svirčić, Croatian comics artist (Gusari na Atlantiku, U ledenoj pustinji), dies at age 92.
- December 25: Núria Pompeia, Spanish comics artist (Nosotras: Las mujeres objeto-ras, La Educación de Palmira, La Liberadas and Ramoneta), dies at age 85.
- December 26: Duck Edwing, American comics artist (Mad Magazine), dies at age 81 or 82.
- December 27: John Calnan, American comics artist (worked for DC Comics), dies at age 84.
- December 28–29: Raymond Burki, Swiss political cartoonist, dies at age 67.
- December 29: Emilio Uberti, Italian comics artist (Kociss, Diabolik), illustrator, film director and documentary maker, dies at age 84.
- December 30: Roger Leiner, Luxembourgian cartoonist and comics artist (Superhjemp), dies at age 61.
- December 30: Giovanni Degli Esposti Venturi, Italian comics artist and illustrator (La Viuda (Lady X - Lust's Captive),Sexo, amor y fantasías, Los Duelistas, La Psy), dies at age 52.

=== Specific date unknown ===
- Bernard Linssen, Belgian comics artist (Les Aventures de Tumak, Chroniques Gorilles), dies at age 49 or 50.

== First issues by title ==
Aether & Empire
Released April by Blue Juice Comics. Writer: Mike Horan Artist: Bong Ty Dazo

Batgirl and the Birds of Prey
Released July by DC Comics. Writers: Julie Benson and Shawna Benson Artist: Claire Roe

Civil War II
Released June by Marvel Comics. Writer: Brian Michael Bendis Artist: David Marquez

Dept H
Released April by Dark Horse Comics. Writer & Artist: Matt Kindt Colorist: Sharlene Kindt

Fourth Planet
Released April by Chapterhouse Comics. Writer: Fred Kenndedy Artist: Miko Maciaszek

The Flintstones
Released June by DC Comics. Writer & Artist: Mark Russell and Steve Pugh Colorist: Chris Chuckry

James Bond 007: Hammerhead
Released September by Dynamite Entertainment. Writer: Andy Diggle Artist: Luca Casalanguida

Kill or Be Killed
Released August by Image Comics. Writer: Ed Brubaker Artist: Sean Phillips

The Land That Time Forgot
Released July by American Mythology Productions. Writer: Mike Wolfer Artist: Giancarlo Caracuzzo

Motor Girl
Released November by Abstract Studio. Writer & Artist: Terry Moore

Resident Alien: The Man with No Name
Released September by Dark Horse Comics. Writer: Paul Hogan Artist: Steve Parkhouse

La Sagesse des mythes
Released September by Glénat Editions. Writers: Luc Ferry and Clotilde Bruneau. Artistic director: Didier Poli

Space Battle Lunchtime
Released May by Oni Press. Writer & Artist: Natalie Riess
