= El Jabato =

El Jabato (lit. "The young wild boar") is the hero of a series of Spanish comic books, created in 1958 by the writer Víctor Mora and illustrated mainly by Francisco Darnís. El Jabato's themes and cast of characters were similar to those of the other series created by Mora, Capitán Trueno, although El Jabato is set in ancient Rome, while Capitán Trueno was a knight-errant of the Middle Ages.

El Jabato concerns the adventures of two Iberian warriors, El Jabato and a giant, gluttonous sidekick, Taurus, who are taken from their native lands by the invading Roman armies. A third character (the girl), named Claudia, a Roman girl who eventually embraces Christianity, is also introduced in the first issue of the series.

A fourth character was subsequently added. This was Fideo de Mileto (Phideus of Miletus), a very minor Greek poet who torments Taurus with his endless verses, with which he narrates the adventures of his friends. Fideo carries a lyre (which Taurus has attempted to destroy more than once), and fights his enemies with his musical powers. Even later, more characters were added: a boy named Tai-Li, a tiger named Bambú, and a monkey named Bongo.

The series was immensely popular in Spain, especially during the time of the dictatorship. The main series had an uninterrupted run for 381 issues, before it was affected by the Spanish comic-book crisis that eventually affected all Spanish titles. In addition to the main series another magazine (El Jabato Extra) run for 51 issues plus one special. El Jabato also had an additional series of adventures published inside the magazine "El Capitán Trueno Extra", between the issues 176 and 333.

In 1989 it was adapted into a video game.

== See also ==
- Víctor Mora
- Ambrós
- Comic
- Capitán Trueno
- Spanish comics
- Knights of the Broken Pixels
