= Ambrós =

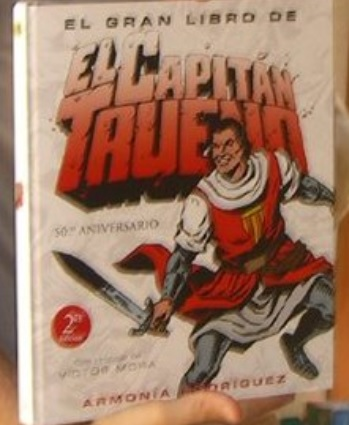
- Capitán Trueno, the most popular Spanish comic to date was illustrated for most of its history by Ambrós.
- Born: 31 August 1913; Albuixech
- Died: 30 September 1992 (aged 79); Barcelona
- Occupation: Cartoonist

Miguel Ambrosio Zaragoza (31 August 1913 – 30 September 1992), better known as Ambrós, was a comic strip cartoonist, most famous for the comic book series Capitán Trueno (Captain Thunder).

== Career ==
Ambrós started his professional life as a teacher, and taught children until the end of the Spanish Civil War. After Franco took over in 1939, he quit teaching, due to political and moral reasons; he did not want to be a mouthpiece for Falangist ideals. He went to work with his parents in the fields instead.

In 1946, he met with Juan Puerto, founder of the Editorial Valenciana. Ambrós showed him the comic that he had been working on, El Guerrero del Antifaz (The Masked Warrior), and, impressed, Puerto opened the possibility for Ambrós to draw some humorous comic strips for his editorial. In the same year, Ambrós left Albuixech for Barcelona, where he began to make a living drawing comics for an array of small magazines, including his adventure series Dos Yanquís en África (Two Yankees in Africa), published by Bergis Mundial, and a range of comics for the weekly magazine, Chispa.

His first substantial success came when he was asked to illustrate the series El Caballero Fantasma, (the Ghost Horseman,) written by Federico Amorós. Published by Grafidea, the series followed a character with noticeable similarities to el Zorro. Things hit a halt when another publisher, Saturn, demanded that the character be killed, as they had already a series named El Caballero Fantasma. Rather than stop publishing the series, Amorós carried it on, but from the perspective of the Ghost Horseman's protégé, El Jinete Fantasma (The Ghost Rider.) Rather than damage sales, as had been expected, sales went through the roof. Due to the success of El Jinete Fantasma, Ambrós was rewarded by a contract with the famous Editorial Bruguera. While working for Bruguera, he illustrated Pulgarcito's La nave del tiempo (The Time Ship), of which ten annuals were published.

His greatest fame yet was to come in 1956, when he was approached with the job of developing and illustrating Capitán Trueno from the synopsis provided by the writer, Víctor Mora. Capitán Trueno was published both in Pulgarcito magazine and as a biweekly comic book. After the 22nd edition, a new Capitán Trueno comic book was published every week, pushing Ambrós into a frenetic work schedule. Until the 35th edition, Ambrós did all illustration on his own, but thereafter, he was assisted in the creation of many editions (36, 38–45, 47-168 and 173–175) by a colourist by the name of Beaumont. Capitán Trueno occupied a central place in Pulgarcito magazine also. Shifting 350,000 copies at its peak, it achieved an unequalled level of popularity for a Spanish comic.

However, this success did not bear any financial reward for Ambrós, who was working hard. Thus, he quit Capitán Trueno after edition 175. In 1960, he moved to Paris to try to start a career as a painter, but he failed to find fortune and returned to Spain in 1964, where he would work for Bruguera yet again. Although he did not want to start drawing Capitán Trueno again, preferring to draw Tarzan and Rintintin comic strips and to illustrate the magazine's short stories, he was obliged to draw 'Trueno Extra' comic books from September 1964 onwards. He would only illustrate three editions. He left Bruguera in 1965 and started to work for the Editorial Valenciana, for whom he drew many comic strips, including El Corsario de Hierro, (The Iron Privateer), another Víctor Mora character.

In 1981, Ambrós retired from the world of comic books, and, except for a one-off edition of Capitán Trueno for Editorial Toutain's History of Comics, he would never return. He received the Gran Premio del Salón del Cómic prize for his contribution to comics in 1989, and he would die three years later.
