= Virgil Reilly =

Australian painter & cartoonist (1892–1974)

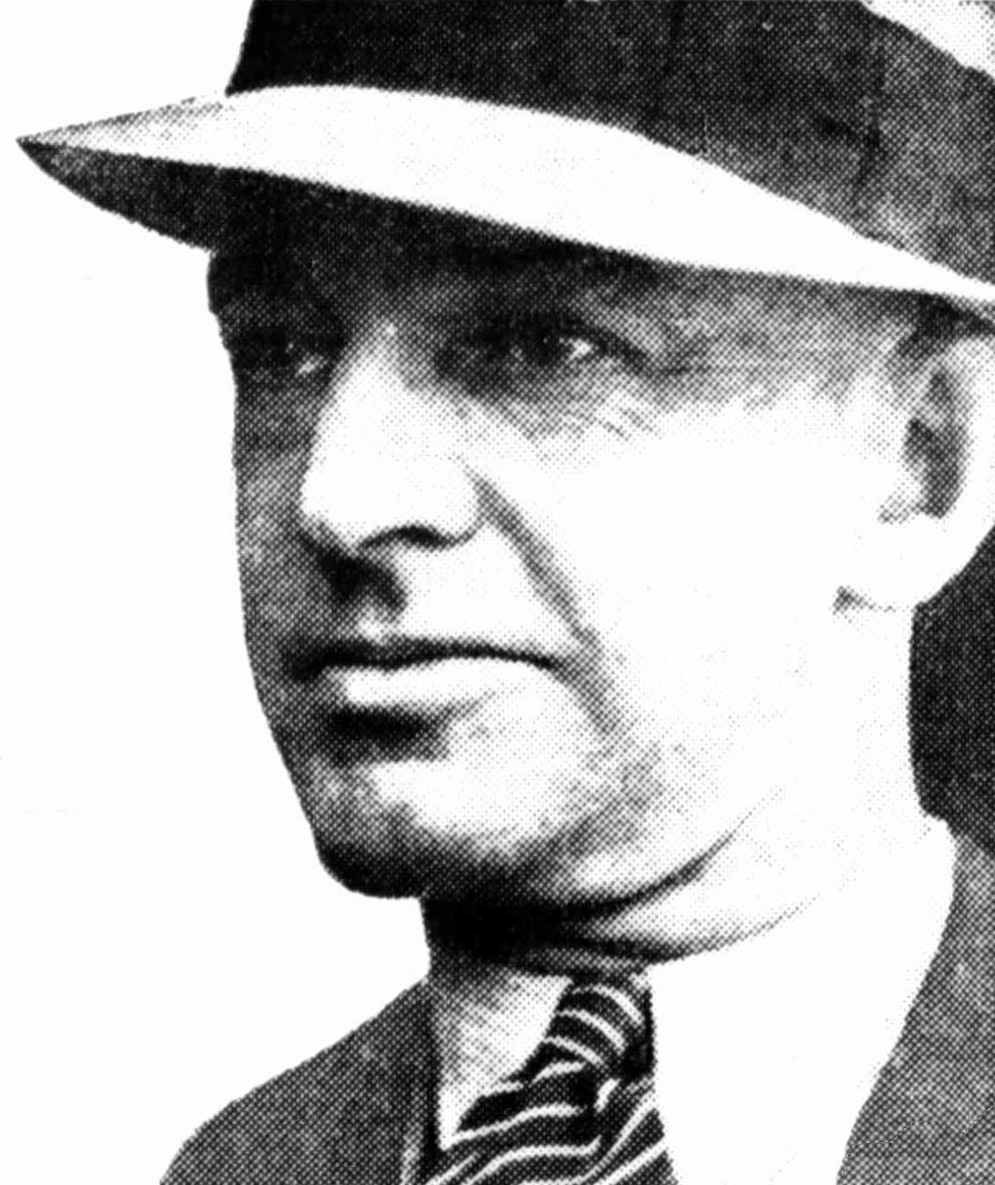
- Virgil Reilly, photograph published in the Truth newspaper (Sydney), 2 November 1941.
- Born: Virgil Gavan Reilly; 29 November 1892; Charlton, Victoria, Australia
- Died: 23 January 1974 (aged 81); Sydney, Australia
- Occupations: Cartoonist, comic book/strip artist, illustrator
- Writing career
- Pen name: Virgil
- Period: 1910 – c. 1958

Signature
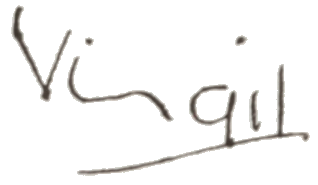

Virgil Reilly (29 November 1892 – 23 January 1974), was an Australian cartoonist, comic book artist and illustrator. In a long and varied career, he was one of Australia's most famous newspaper and magazine artists and a prolific comic-book illustrator. He was known as 'Virgil', the name he signed on his work. While working for Smith's Weekly during the inter-war years he became well known for his cartoons of glamorous and seductive young women that became known as 'Virgil's girls'. During World War II he continued to draw cartoons featuring sensual and assertive young women for the Sunday Telegraph and contributed cover art, patriotic cartoons and paintings for the Australian Women's Weekly. In the late-1940s and 1950s Reilly was a prolific and successful comic-book artist, known for his fictional creations such as 'Silver Flash' and the 'Rocket Squadron', as well as his depictions of actual naval battles.

== Biography ==
=== Early life ===
Virgil Gavan Reilly was born on 29 November 1892 at Charlton in the mallee country of north-west Victoria, the son of John Gavan Reilly and Mayne (née Collins), the second-born of five children in the family. His father was the local postmaster who also wrote poetry. In July 1895 John Reilly, by then living at Creswick in central Victoria, was declared to be insolvent, caused by the "continued illness of wife, illness and death in family, and pressure of creditors". By 1904 Virgil was being educated at South Melbourne College. Virgil's father later found work as a journalist.

Virgil Reilly began to develop his artistic skills after he fractured his back. He "took up drawing" to relieve the boredom while he was recuperating in bed.

=== Staff and freelance jobs ===
Virgil Reilly's first staff position was with the Truth newspaper in Melbourne, owned and edited by John Norton. He answered the newspaper's advertisement "for an artist who could do likenesses", which essentially involved court work, sketching defendants and witnesses. Reilly worked for Truth for about two years, but he "eventually got sacked" because his drawings were "too refined" for Norton.

From about 1910 Reilly worked as a commercial artist for a motion picture advertising firm in Melbourne. During that period he was a participant in the creation of cinema advertisements, featuring a combination of live-action and drawn animation. The animated sequences were some of the earliest examples of Australian animation films, producing "lightning sketches" by means of a stop-motion animation process. One surviving example from 1910 was an advertisement for the Collins Street draper, George's Fine Furs; live-action sequences showed models wearing the fur coats and hats, followed by animated sequences of the artist's hand creating, at speed, intricate drawings of women wearing the fashionable apparel.

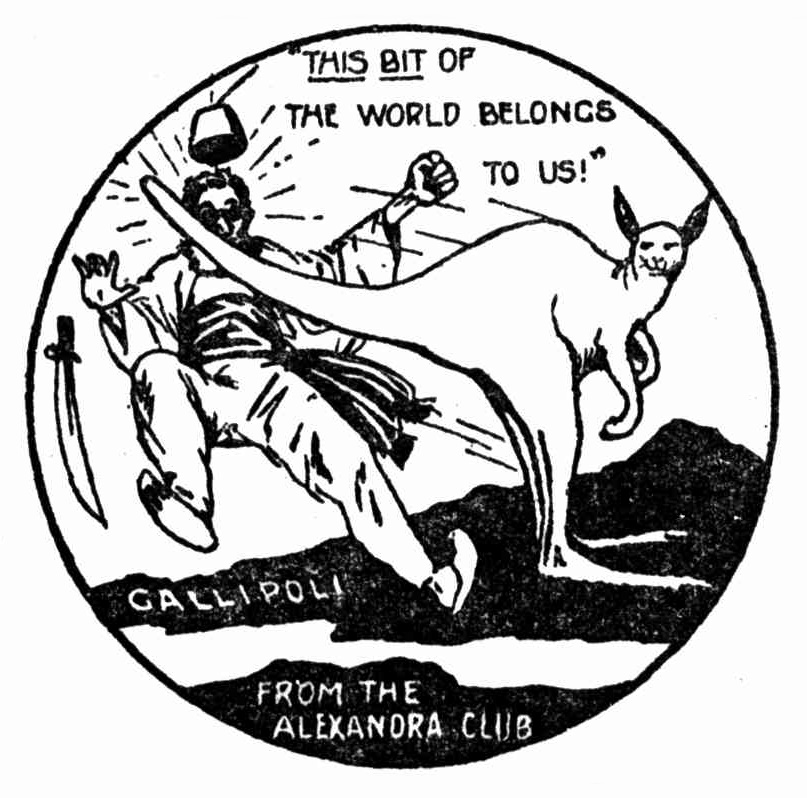
Reilly's patriotic cartoon for the Alexandra Club's 1915 'Christmas billies' campaign.

Reilly contributed images to a short story entitled 'Good Doctor Haman', written by J. H. Monk, published on 1 July 1913 in the Sydney-based literary magazine, The Lone Hand. By 1914 Reilly was a member of the Victorian Artists' Society. At the Society's annual masquerade "revel" in June 1914, he attended in the costume of a "Futurist Pierrot".

A painting by Virgil Reilly was used for the cover of the 14 July 1915 "war issue" of The Sydney Mail. The image featured a cowering woman and a small child covered by the menacing shadow of an armed German officer wearing a spiked helmet. Another patriotic image by Reilly, of a soldier comforting a weeping woman, was published on the October 1915 cover of The Lone Hand.

In September 1915 the Alexandra Club in Melbourne, a private members club for women, launched a patriotic campaign to send twenty thousand billycans filled with donated gifts to the Australian troops serving overseas during World War I. The idea behind the 'Christmas billies' scheme was that the contents of each billy would be surprise Christmas gifts for the recipients at the front. The billycans were sold for sixpence, to be packed with gifts and returned to the Alexandra Club for despatch to the soldiers. Each of the billycans had a khaki label on which was printed a cartoon by the "young Melbourne artist named Virgil". The cartoon depicted a kangaroo striking a Turkish soldier with its tail, on a background of a map of the Gallipoli peninsula, with text reading "This bit of the world belongs to us!". Reilly also contributed drawings for the printed programs of charity events in Melbourne during the war-years.

From early in his career Reilly signed his artworks with a distinctive signature, 'Virgil'. The artist was a man of short stature; in later life he referred to himself as "one of Sydney’s oldest leprechauns".

=== To Sydney ===
In about 1917 Reilly was persuaded to relocate to Sydney by the journalist Roy Evans, who at that time was working for the theatrical firm of J. and N. Tait. In Sydney Reilly was engaged by Fordyce Wheeler, the advertising manager of Sun Newspapers Ltd. Wheeler took an innovative approach to his role and actively encouraged "pictorial and black and white work" in advertisements. Wheeler offered Reilly a job "doing moving picture work"; during the period from about 1918 to 1920 Reilly was employed to draw advertising graphics for motion picture releases. His images advertising feature films were published in both The Sun newspaper in Sydney and The Herald in Melbourne.

While he was working for Wheeler, Reilly met a photographer named Hugh Williamson. Williamson invited Reilly to his home at Richmond, west of Sydney at the foot of the Blue Mountains, where Reilly met Williamson's younger sister, Dorothy. Reilly and Dorothy Josephine Williamson, aged 17 years, were married in April 1918 in Sydney. It was remarked in a report of the marriage that "the bridegroom is well known in Sydney as a cartoonist and an exponent of black and white work". The couple had four children, all boys, born between 1920 and 1926.

During the period working for The Sun, Reilly received a salary of £5 a week. At this time he also rented a studio in Burdekin House in Macquarie Street for the purpose of doing commissioned portraits.

In December 1924 Reilly lodged a patent in the United States Patent Office for an "optical apparatus for use in the hand reproduction of drawings, photographs, and other illustrations or designs".

=== Smith's Weekly ===
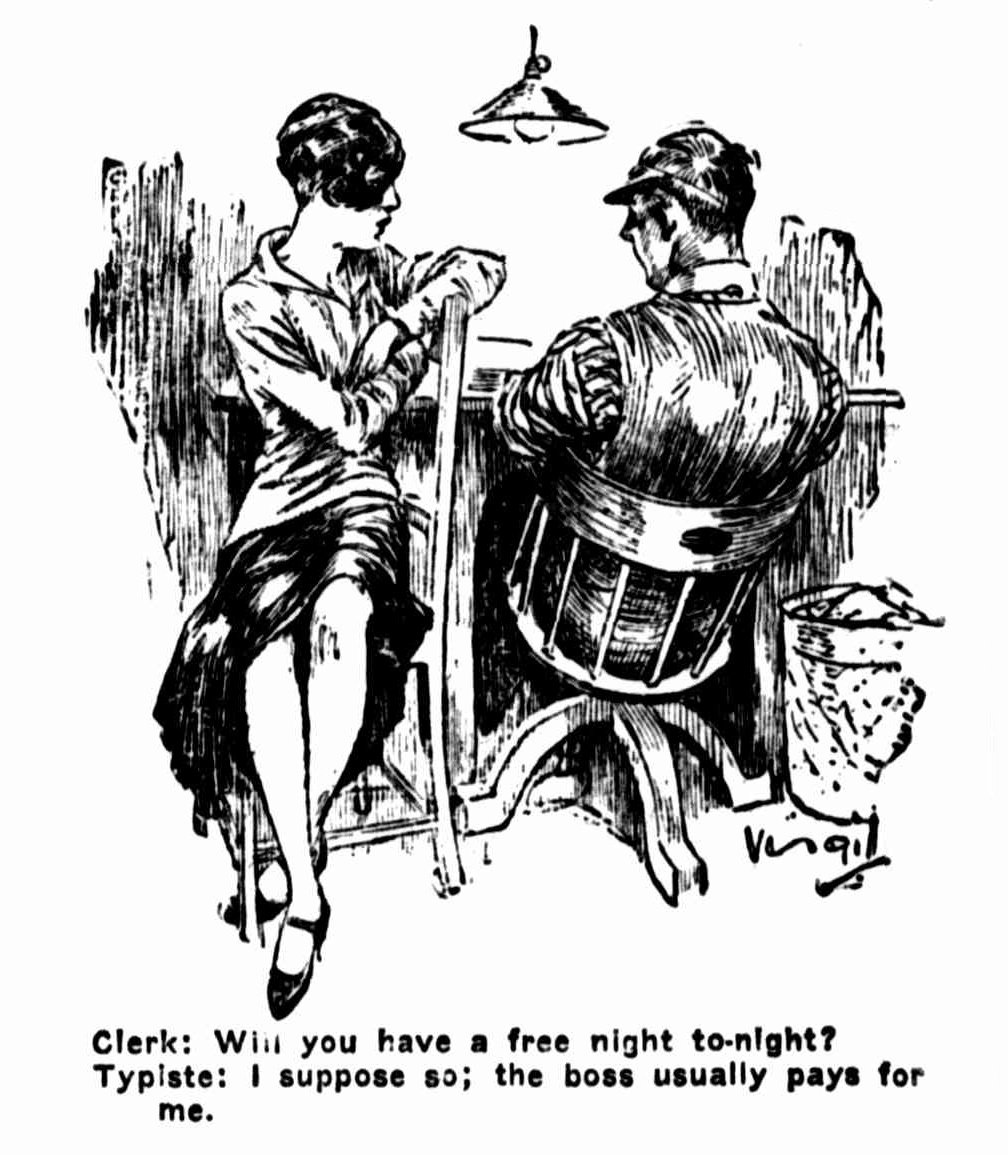
Clerk: Will you have a free night to-night? Typiste: I suppose so; the boss usually pays for me. (from Smith's Weekly, 19 June 1926).

From about January 1924 Reilly began to contribute drawings to Smith's Weekly, the independent Sydney tabloid newspaper which gave prominence to cartoons and illustrations in its pages. During most of 1924 his contributions consisted of drawings to illustrate articles, often with dramatic themes with similarities to his motion picture advertising work. Reilly was also creating illustrations for advertisements during this period.

From the beginning of 1925 Reilly's contributions to Smith's Weekly began to increase in both the number and variety of his drawings, an indication he had been employed as a staff artist by that stage. In the first edition of Smith's Weekly for 1925, four of his drawings were published, including two article illustrations and a Dad and Dave cartoon. The fourth drawing to be included in the issue of 3 January 1925 was an early example of what was to become Reilly's trademark style for the next eighteen years. The drawing is a cartoon depicting a boss and stylish young woman, newly employed as a typist: "Boss (dictating): 'Am I too fast for you?'; New Typiste: 'Good heavens, no! My last employer used to dictate with me sitting on his knee'".

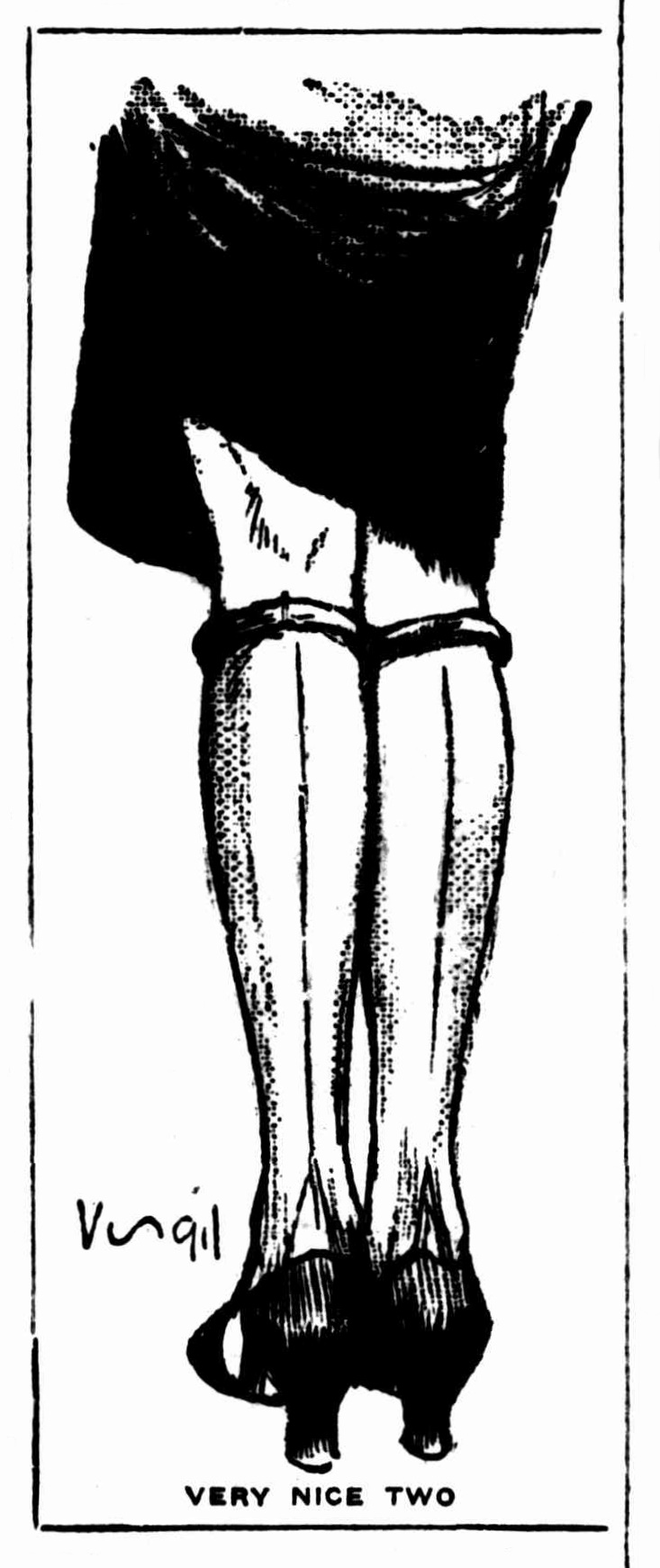
'Very Nice Two', cartoon by Virgil Reilly, Smith's Weekly, 2 January 1926.

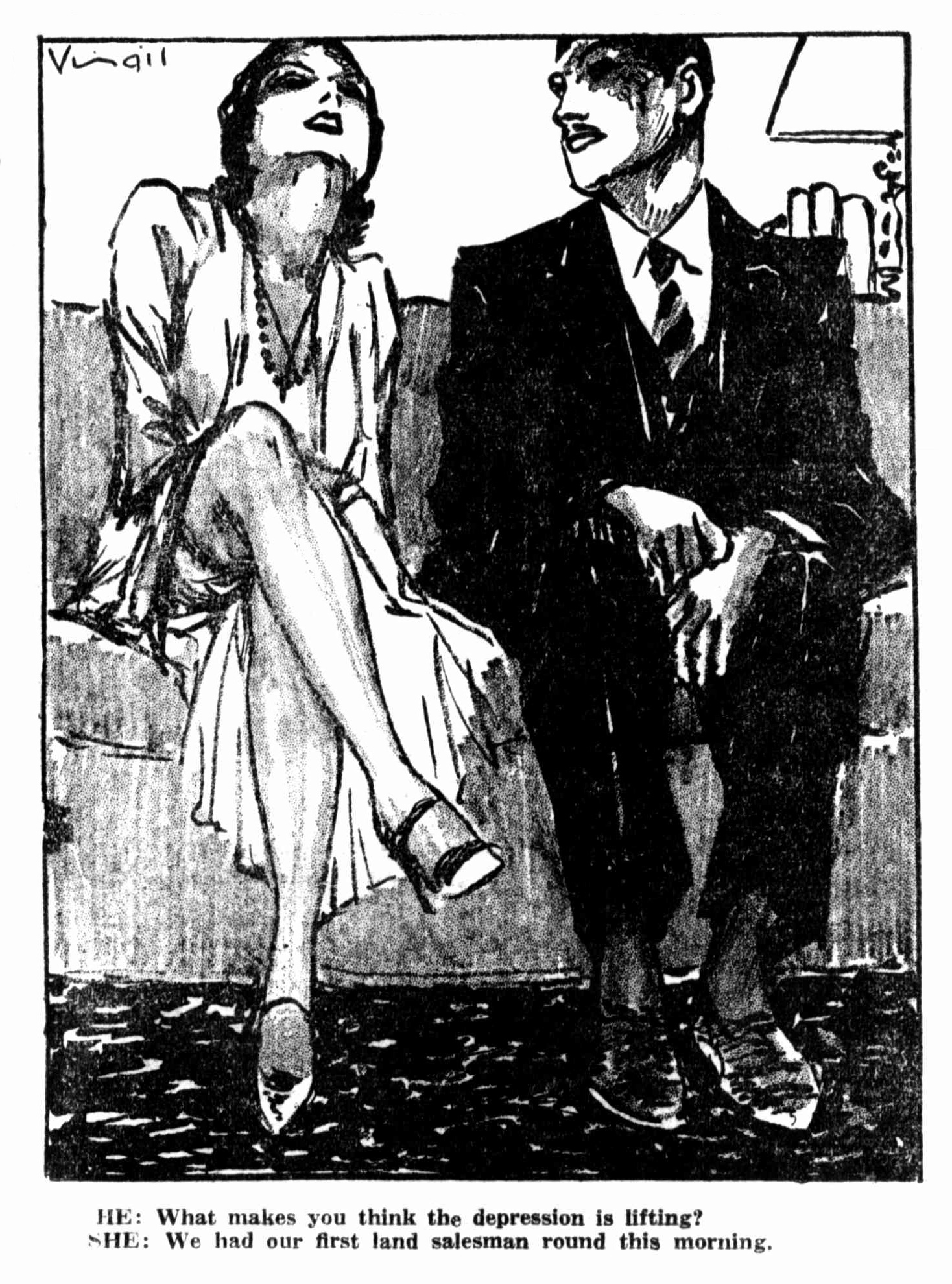
He: What makes you think the depression is lifting?
She: We had our first land salesman round this morning."
(from Smith's Weekly, 12 March 1932).

In a 1972 interview Reilly spoke of Smith's Weekly as "the great newspaper university" where he "learned about life". During 1925 Virgil Reilly's drawings published in Smith's Weekly included illustrations for articles, as well as portraits and cartoons on a number of subjects. Increasingly interspersed amongst his contributions were cartoons featuring young women, a theme that progressively predominated in his illustrations for Smith's.

With his drawings of sultry young women, Reilly had found his niche. By 1926 they represented the majority of his contributions. By the late 1920s Reilly's series of erotically-charged cartoons of confident and sensual young women in Smith's Weekly began to be known as 'Virgil's girls'. Reilly's work in this mode has been described as "brisk, detailed pen drawings that included one or two of his seductive 'flappers' cheerfully flirting or discussing divorce". His popular depictions of self-assured and saucy young women were the Australian cultural parallels of the American Gibson Girls and the later Petty Girls. Reilly became one of Australia's best-known newspaper artists, due primarily to the popularity of his 'Virgil girl' images. In 1933, during divorce proceedings, Reilly stated that his wife Dorothy had been the inspiration for his drawings and "almost invariably was his model".

From February 1928 Reilly began a collaboration with poet and journalist Kenneth Slessor, who also worked for Smith's Weekly, with Reilly's drawings presented alongside Slessor's poetry. The partnership between Slessor and Reilly was maintained on a semi-regular basis until November 1933. Many of Slessor's poems were social observations with a focus on women, which was a perfect fit with Reilly's preferred output during that period. The poem 'The Green Rolls Royce', published in August 1928, was the first in a series under the title of 'Darlinghurst Nights'. The series' title was discontinued after October 1928, though two poems during October 1930 bore the collective title of 'New Darlinghurst Nights'. Forty-one of Slessor's poems, previously published in Smith's Weekly between 1928 and 1931, each with Reilly's original illustrations, were collected in a single volume called Darlinghurst Nights, published in 1931 by Frank C. Johnson.

Reilly also occasionally drew cartoons of political and social criticism for Smith's. In July 1931, at the height of the Great Depression, he drew a cartoon critical of Jack Lang, Premier of New South Wales. An article in March 1933 reporting on the persecution of Jews in the early months of Nazi Germany incorporated an illustration by Reilly, depicting a German soldier seated on a large helmet, with crushed Jewish corpses beneath. In May 1934 Reilly drew a cartoon satirising the British Royal family.

In January 1931 Virgil Reilly, of 66 Boronia Road, Bellevue Hill, initiated bankruptcy proceedings and all persons having claims against him were required to provide proof of the debt. Dividends of one shilling in the pound were declared at various intervals over the next several years, payable through an appointed Trustee's office. It was asserted in 1933 that Reilly's financial problems had arisen from his purchase of a total of nine motor vehicles in the space of ten years. By about 1933 Reilly was receiving a salary of £26 a week from Smith's Weekly, but at that time he had debts amounting to £3,600 "due to bad investments" and his salary "was taken and instalments paid each week off his debts". He claimed that sometimes all that remained of his wages was nine shillings a week. In addition to his salaried work with Smith's Weekly, Reilly also occasionally took on freelance work such as advertising; under the deed of arrangement his creditors had claims to a substantial proportion of his salary, but "they had agreed not to take any outside money that he earns".

In late 1933 Virgil and Dorothy Reilly went through divorce proceedings, the details of which were published in various newspapers. In about May 1933 Dorothy had formed a relationship with Fordyce Wheeler, the 64-year-old advertising manager and a director of Sun Newspapers Ltd. Dorothy had met Wheeler through her husband. On July 7, after the affair had become known to him, Reilly followed his wife to Wheeler's home in Edgecliffe and in company with three other persons, watched the house all night until they saw Mrs. Reilly emerge at eight o'clock the next morning. Reilly petitioned for divorce on the ground of adultery, with Wheeler named as the co-respondent, and the matter came before the Divorce Court on 19 December 1933. Justice Boyce accepted the evidence that adultery had occurred and dismissed Dorothy's cross-petition alleging her husband's "cruelty and habitual drunkenness". Boyce granted a decree nisi and ordered the co-respondent Wheeler to pay the costs of the petition. By consent between the parties, guardians were appointed for the four children of the marriage, with "the parents to have reasonable equal access, to be arranged by the guardians". The counsel for Mrs. Reilly requested that the period for making the divorce absolute be shortened to three months, stating "that Wheeler desired to marry" his client, but the judge refused the request.^{[A]}

In September 1934 Reilly became engaged to Ruth 'Petah' King, a business-woman with a hosiery and lingerie shop in the Imperial Arcade. The couple married in January 1935 in Sydney.

In December 1934 Reilly participated in the inaugural exhibition by the Painter-Etchers and Graphic Art Society.

In September 1936 a film featuring Virgil Reilly at work, called 'How Virgil Draws Those Girls', was shown at the Sydney State Theatrette. The short feature, which included live-action and animated sequences, showed Reilly at his drawing-board, "sketching several of the types of Australian girls that made him famous"; the subject of his drawing "springs miraculously to life" and the girl, in human form, walks across the screen.

=== Consolidated Press ===
In 1938 Reilly left Smith's Weekly and joined the staff of Frank Packer's company, Consolidated Press, which published The Daily Telegraph and The Australian Women's Weekly. In January 1938 a full-page 'Virgil girl' drawing was used in the launch of the Daily Telegraph Home Magazine, a new supplement to the Monday edition of the newspaper. In March 1938 an article by Reilly entitled 'How I Judged a Beauty Contest' was published in the Home Magazine, illustrated by a detailed drawing by the artist, based on a "South Coast beauty contest" he had recently judged.

From February 1938 until September 1941 Virgil Reilly was amongst a select number of artists whose paintings were regularly used to illustrate the cover of the Australian Women's Weekly. Reilly's covers included a numbered series of seven paintings of 'Typical Australian Girls', as well as patriotic subjects and portraits of members of the British Royal family. From 1941 onwards the magazine increasingly began to use colour photographs for its cover-image.

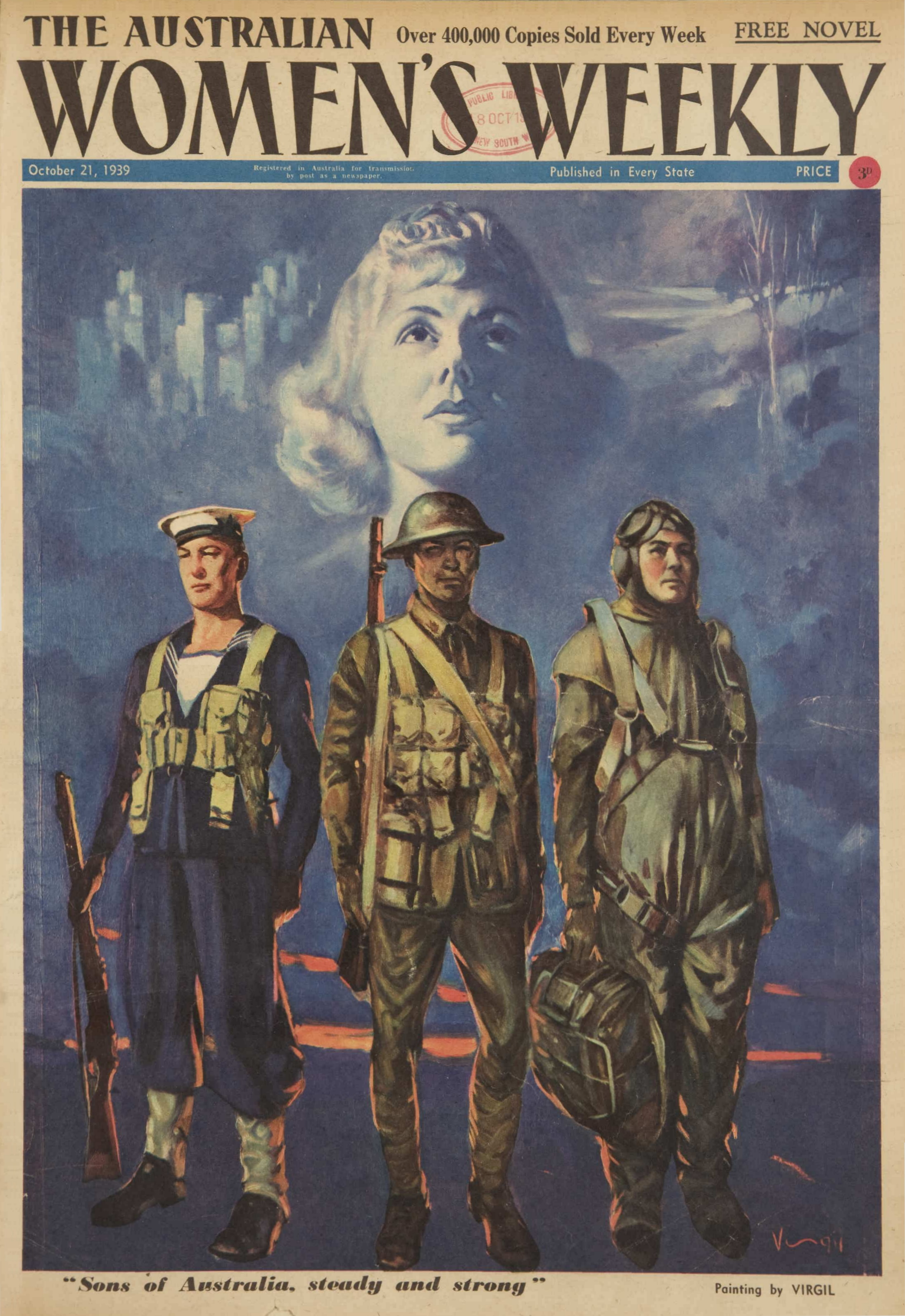
The cover of The Australian Women's Weekly 21 October 1939; painting by Virgil Reilly.

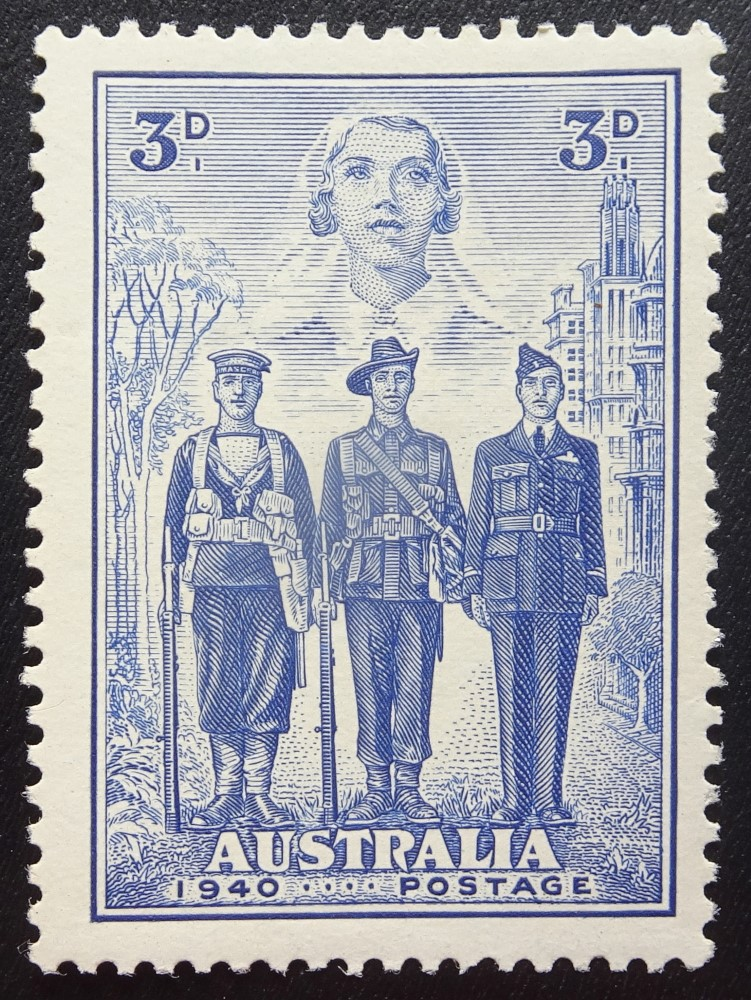
One of the four Australian Armed Forces stamps (three pence value), inspired by Reilly's painting.

The cover of the 21 October 1939 issue of the Australian Women's Weekly, in the early months of the Second World War, was one of Reilly's patriotic cover designs. The image depicted three members of the Australian armed forces standing to attention – a sailor, soldier and airman; in the background was a woman's face flanked by images illustrative of the city and the countryside.^{[B]} Reilly commented on the meaning of the image: "My idea was to show the Australian woman representing the home and family with her protectors, the three armed forces of the Commonwealth". Reilly's painting inspired an Australian stamp design, issued in four denominations in July 1940. The stamp design by Frank D. Manley was the first stamp from a British Empire country to commemorate participation in the World War II. It followed most aspects of Reilly's design, but replaced the archetypal woman's face with the head and shoulders of a nurse.

From November 1939 a regular weekly column entitled 'No Man's Land' appeared in the Australian Women's Weekly. The column featured military-related news items as well as regular patriotic and political cartoons by Virgil Reilly. The column continued until June 1940, though Reilly's contributions ceased after February 1940.

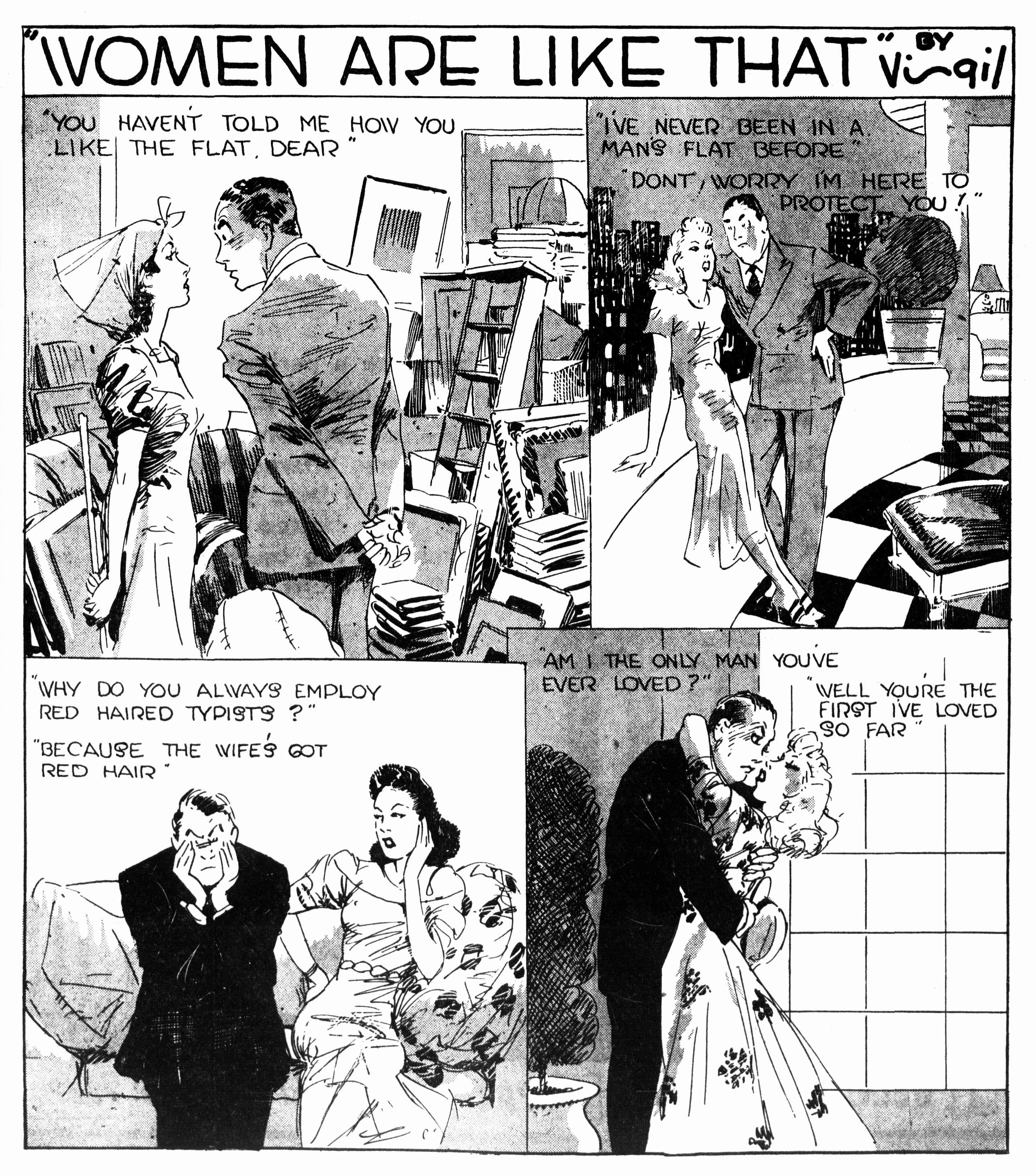
'Women Are Like That', cartoons by Virgil Reilly (published in the Sunday Telegraph, 8 September 1940).

From December 1939 until January 1941 Reilly produced a regular set of themed cartoons for the Sunday Telegraph (the Sunday edition of the Daily Telegraph). The groups of cartoons were based around his 'Virgil girl' images, with a loose drawing style and titles such as 'How to Get in the Doghouse', 'The Bride Wore White', 'Between Us Girls' and 'Feminine Foolishness'. Between January 1941 to June 1941 a cartoon feature by Reilly entitled 'The Virgil Girl' was regularly published in the Sunday Telegraph. Compared to his earlier work for the Telegraph, these were more finished, single-image cartoons. In May and June 1941 'The Virgil Girl' appeared as painted images in the colour pictorial section of the Sunday Telegraph.

By about 1940, Reilly's marriage to Petah King had begun to experience difficulties. Reilly later claimed, "we got broken up because my wife started to associate with a man". After a series of "violent rows" Petah became ill and her doctor advised that the couple should live apart "to give her a chance to recover". Reilly went to a hotel and Petah lived at Meudon Flats in Elizabeth Bay. Eventually the couple reunited and set up a home at 'Grantham' in St. Neot's Avenue, Potts Point. In September 1941 Reilly again accused Petah of seeing the man; the couple had "another violent row" and Reilly left the home. Reilly claimed Petah had told him, "I have a man's outlook, and I want to be free... I do not want to live with any man. I want to be a free agent". In October Petah King (Reilly) issued a summons to her husband to answer a charge of assault. Reilly's address in the information before the court was Macleay Street, Potts Point (or alternately, care of the Daily Telegraph offices in Pulsford Chambers in Castlereagh Street). When the parties appeared in court, the magistrate urged them to confer and negotiate a common agreement rather than give evidence against each other in court. During an adjournment in the case this was achieved, with Reilly and his wife consenting "to mutual undertakings not to molest each other".

By late 1942, Reilly and Petah were living in separate flats "in the block of posh flats known as Cambrian Place" at 36a Macleay Street in Potts Point (he on the sixth floor and she on the third). After disturbances during the Christmas period between Virgil and Petah (involving banging on doors, "bad language" and "crockery being broken"), the agent filed applications to evict both from their flats. Reilly challenged his eviction notice and in January 1943 the magistrate in the Paddington Court denied the agent's application. In March 1943 details of Reilly's failing second marriage were again made public when he filed a suit for the restitution of his marriage, and then a week later submitted a petition for the dissolution of the marriage, alleging his wife's adultery "with a man named Farmer". At that time Reilly was still living at Cambrian Place and was described as an artist "well known throughout Australia for his renditions of slinky cuties in diaphanous garb". After several months Reilly filed a second marriage restitution order, which Petah failed to comply with, as a result of which a decree nisi for dissolution of the marriage was granted in September 1941. The divorce between Virgil and Petah Reilly was finalised in July 1944.

Reilly's eldest son Gavan had enlisted in the A.I.F. in July 1940. Gavan Reilly was killed in December 1942 during an attack on a Japanese defensive position at Sanananda Point near Buna in New Guinea. Reilly was initially informed that his son had died in an ambush from a sniper's bullet. In about October 1943 the artist received a letter from Fred Oughton, who had served with Gavan, describing "the true facts of his son's gallant sacrifice". Gavan Reilly had been badly wounded by machine-gun fire during an advance against a heavily-defended Japanese position. Mortally wounded, he called out to his companions "that he was done, and not attempt to get him", but "the boys continued to crawl toward him". Realising the extreme danger for the men attempting to reach him, Gavan "pulled a hand-grenade from his webbing, pulled the pin, and placed it beneath his body, thus ending his life to save his comrades". In the letter to Gavan's father, Oughton described the action of his comrade and friend as one "that marked him for ever as a gallant, courageous man, and a hero in the true sense of the word". In April 1944 Reilly's 18-year-old son Jervis, together with two other young men, died in a car accident near Pitt Town.

In 1944 the Australian Women's Weekly arranged with the Naval Board for three of the magazine's representatives – the war correspondent Reg Harris, photographer Jack Hickson and artist Virgil Reilly – to spend several weeks aboard naval ships on service in the south-west Pacific. Reilly's contributions to the special Naval edition of the Women's Weekly in September 1944 were paintings of an operation being carried out in the sick bay of the H.M.A.S. Shropshire, a portrait of an ack-ack gunner and a depiction of the wireless room of the H.M.A.S. Australia. Reilly also wrote an article for the issue, recording his impressions and observations of the young men serving on the naval vessels.

After the surrender of Japan in August 1945, Reilly was sent to Singapore for the Daily Telegraph, from where he sent an article and drawings for the newspaper.

=== Comics and newspaper work ===
In April 1940, the Australian government banned the importation of magazines and comics which were considered to "of no literary value". The publications affected were mostly of American origin. The purpose of the ban was to conserve the dollar currency exchange and was a part of wider import restrictions of goods from non-sterling countries to assist the war effort. The import restrictions had a far-reaching effect on publishing businesses in Australia. Local writers and illustrators were given new opportunities for staff and freelance work to meet the demand for reading material to replace the foreign publications. The import restrictions remained in place until 1959.

In 1947 two comic books illustrated by Virgil Reilly, featuring the character 'Texas Cody', were published by Joseph Swanson Wilkinson for Colorgravure Publications (the book publishing division of The Herald and Weekly Times Ltd.) – Texas Cody and the Treasure Hunters and Texas Cody and the Phantom of the Sand Dunes. From about May 1947 to January 1948 Reilly illustrated the 'Chesty Bond' advertising cartoon-strip, created in 1940 by his colleagues from the Smith's Weekly days, artist Syd Miller and advertising man Ted Moloney. Miller had passed the 'Chesty Bond' comic-strip to illustrator 'Will' Mahoney in July 1945, who in turn passed it to Reilly in May 1947. Cec Linaker took over the illustrations in February 1948.

In September 1950 in Sydney, Reilly married Florence ('Anna') Shanahan (née Collins), formerly of Adelaide. It was Virgil's third marriage and Anna's second. The reception was held at Hampton Court in King's Cross and was attended by "former war correspondent colleagues, newspaper columnists and brother artists". The couple lived in a flat at Potts Point.^{[C]}

In the years 1950 to 1954, Reilly produced the illustrations for a succession of serialised novels, a short story and articles published in Truth newspaper (in both the Sydney and Brisbane editions). They were:

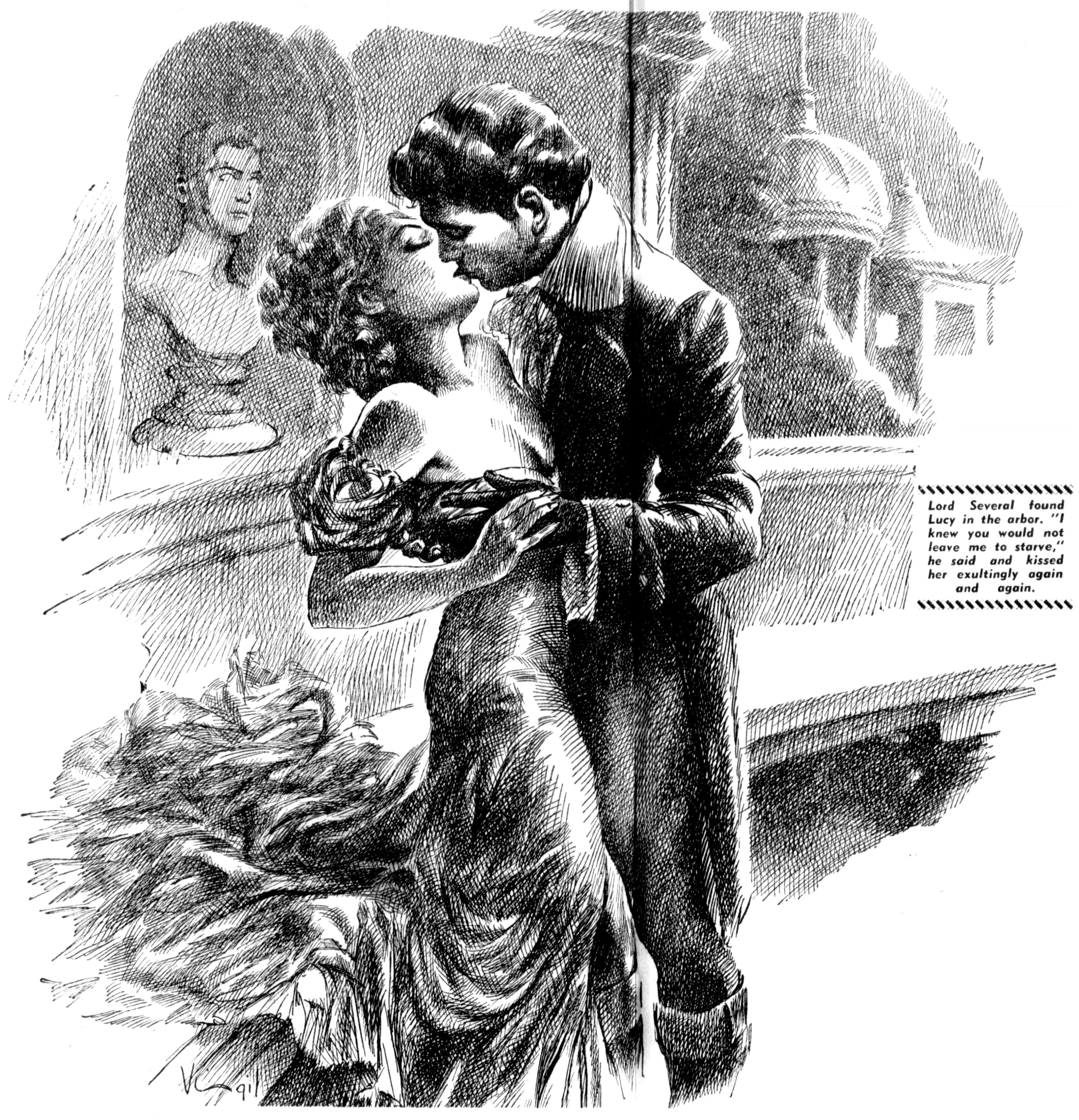
Illustration by Virgil Reilly for the fifth instalment of the serialised novel, 'Royal Madhouse', published in Truth (Sydney), 19 November 1950.

- How Dark! My Lady!, a "fictionalised biography" of "the life and loves" of William Shakespeare, written by the prolific English writer Ursula Bloom (using the nom de plume 'Sheila Burns'); serialised from April to October 1950.
- Royal Madhouse, a "romantic serial... set against the fantastic, glittering backdrop of the licentious days of the Regency period", written by Ursula Bloom (as 'Sheila Burns'); serialised from October 1950 to April 1951.
- Caroline, "a tale of love and intrigue against the glittering backdrop of pre-French Revolution Paris", written by the French writer Jacques Laurent (as 'Cecil Saint-Laurent'); serialised from April 1951 to January 1952.
- The Passionate Poet, the "romantic story" of Lord Byron, written by English writer Madeleine Bingham (as 'Julia Mannering'); serialised from January to June 1952.
- Katrina, "a thrilling romance" set in Russia in the early 18th century about "a peasant girl who rose from poverty to the court of the Czar", written by English writer Jeramie Paiton; serialised from June to October 1952.
- A series of articles by the American journalist Quentin Reynolds, describing "celebrated cases defended by the ace American criminal lawyer, Samuel Leibowitz"; serialised from November to December 1952.
- King's Favorite: The Story of Nell Gwyn, set during the Restoration of the Stuart monarchy in England ("a lively and licentious period"), written by Fenella Strong; serialised from January to April 1953.
- Josephine, the story of "the lustrous Creole beauty", Joséphine de Beauharnais, who married Napoleon Bonaparte, written by Fenella Strong; serialised from May to August 1953.
- Kiss Me Again, Stranger, a short story by English novelist Daphne du Maurier, serialised in September 1953.
- Loves of the Eighth Henry, the story of Henry VIII and his six wives, by Ursula Bloom (under another of her pen-names, Lozania Prole), serialised from September 1953 to January 1954.
- Sayonara, a Japanese-American love story by American writer James Michener; serialised from February to May 1954.
- Death is a Trotter, "a fast-moving thriller of the trotting game" written by the Sydney journalist, Dick Wordley; serialised from May to August 1954.

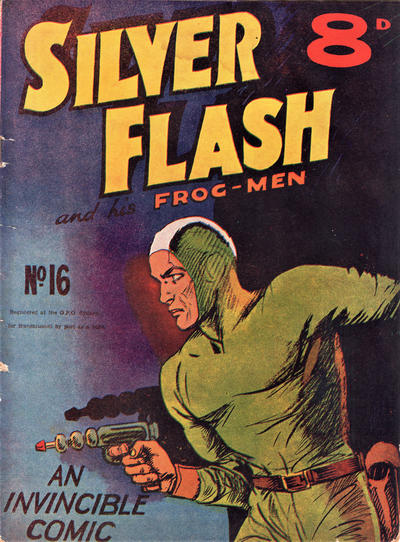
The cover of Silver Flash and his Frog-men, No. 16 (about 1951).

In 1950 Reilly began to illustrate the comic-book Silver Flash and his Frog-men for Invincible Press (a magazine and book publishing company established by Ezra Norton, the proprietor of the Truth and Daily Mirror newspapers). The Silver Flash series of comic books ran for 54 monthly issues, from June 1950 until 1955. In 1955 it was transferred to Calvert Publishing, appearing as Captain Silver Flash (for just three issues, also illustrated by Reilly). The 'Silver Flash' comics featured underwater adventures incorporating science-fiction elements, with the hero Silver Flash (described as the "atom-age Robin Hood of the sea") and his frog-men crew (consisting of 'Guns', 'Pilot', 'Frogface' and 'Tadpole') fighting evil forces from their "jet submarine" based in the centre of the Sargasso Sea. Their adventures included battles against strange sea creatures and encounters with villains such as Vulcan, Queen of the Lizardmen and Dr. Clytron.

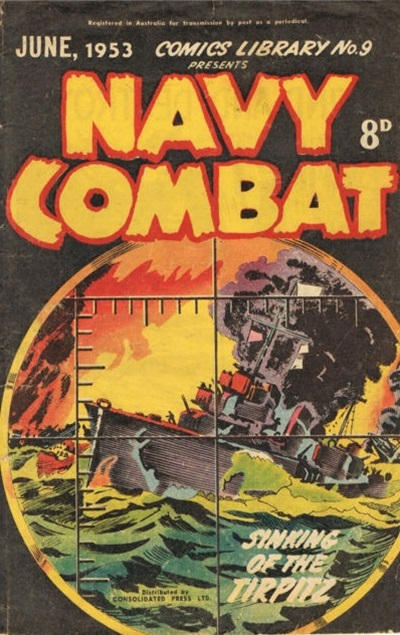
The cover of Comics Library: Navy Combat, No. 9 (June 1953), 'Sinking of the Tirpitz'.

In 1950, as he was starting to create Silver Flash for Invincible Press, Reilly also illustrated the first six issues of The Invisible Avenger for another comic book publisher, Ayers & James, before work pressures forced him to pass the title to Peter Chapman. 'The Invisible Avenger' was a malevolent Chinese scientist, with the power of invisibility, bent on exterminating the "white races" of the world. From November 1950 Reilly began drawing another comic-book series for Ayers & James, 'Punch' Perkins of the Fighting Fleet, published in their Red Circle Series. The comic underwent two name-changes (featuring 'Punch' Perkins and Rocket Squadron) under the overall title of Fighting Fleet Comics, which ran for 22 issues until 1954. The 'Fighting Fleet' series of comics featured 'Punch' Perkins, an Australian naval officer handy with his fists (issues 1-15) and a top-secret unit of the Royal Australian Air Force called Rocket Squadron (issues 16-22). Their enemies were a succession of fiendish overlords, such as Admiral Mong and his Mongoloid invasion fleet, determined to overrun Australia. The covers for the comic titles drawn by Reilly for Ayers & James were generally not his own work. They were occasionally credited to 'Jayar', and are crudely drawn compared to Reilly's Invincible Press covers.

During the early to mid-1950s, Reilly was probably "one of the busiest and most prolific" of Australia's comic artists, illustrating upwards of 48 pages of material per month. From 1952 Ayers & James published a series called Comics Library, though material drawn by Reilly only appeared in every third issue under the title of Navy Combat. Issue No. 3 (December 1952) featured a Rocket Squadron story, but the remainder of the issues drawn by Reilly focussed on depictions of actual naval battles – examples include: 'Sinking of the Tirpitz' (Issue No. 9, June 1953); 'The Battle of the Plate' (Issue No. 18, March 1954); 'The Story of the 3 Sydneys' (Issue No. 21, June 1954) and 'The Battle of the Coral Sea' (Issue No. 24, September 1953). In 1954-5 Approved Publications (associated with Ayers & James) published four comics illustrated by Reilly under the title True Navy Combat: 'The Story of HMAS Australia' (December 1954), 'The Story of H.M.A.S. Perth' (May 1955), 'Atlantic Convoy' (September 1955) and 'Jap Submarines in Sydney Harbour' (November 1955). Reilly also illustrated a number of issues of the Combat comic series for Calvert Publishing in the mid-1950s. Reilly's 'Navy Combat' stories were reprinted in anthology collections up until 1974.

In 1955 and 1956, Reilly illustrated two bushranger biographies written by the author and popular historian, Frank Clune, Martin Cash and Captain Melville (both published by Angus & Robertson). In 1957 he illustrated another of Clune's books, Scandals of Sydney Town. During his working life Reilly also drew illustrations for Kenneth G. Murray's Man magazine, published between 1936 and 1974.

In 1958 Reilly won the inaugural Walkley Award for the 'Best Piece of Creative Artwork or Cartoon' for an illustration published in Sydney's Daily Mirror newspaper. His award-winning artwork was a sentimental drawing commemorating Legacy Week, showing the ghost of a soldier embracing his schoolgirl daughter who is laying a wreath to his memory.

=== Later life ===
In 1968 a fire destroyed Reilly's Potts Point flat, which he shared with his wife Anna. Afterwards a group of Sydney artists established a 'Virgil Fund' to assist with his financial recovery.

Florence ('Anna') Reilly died on 8 June 1972 in the Royal North Shore Hospital in St. Leonards, Sydney, aged 67 years.

Virgil Reilly died of a cerebral hæmorrhage on 23 January 1974 in Sydney, aged 81 years.

== Gallery ==
A selection of images by Virgil Reilly
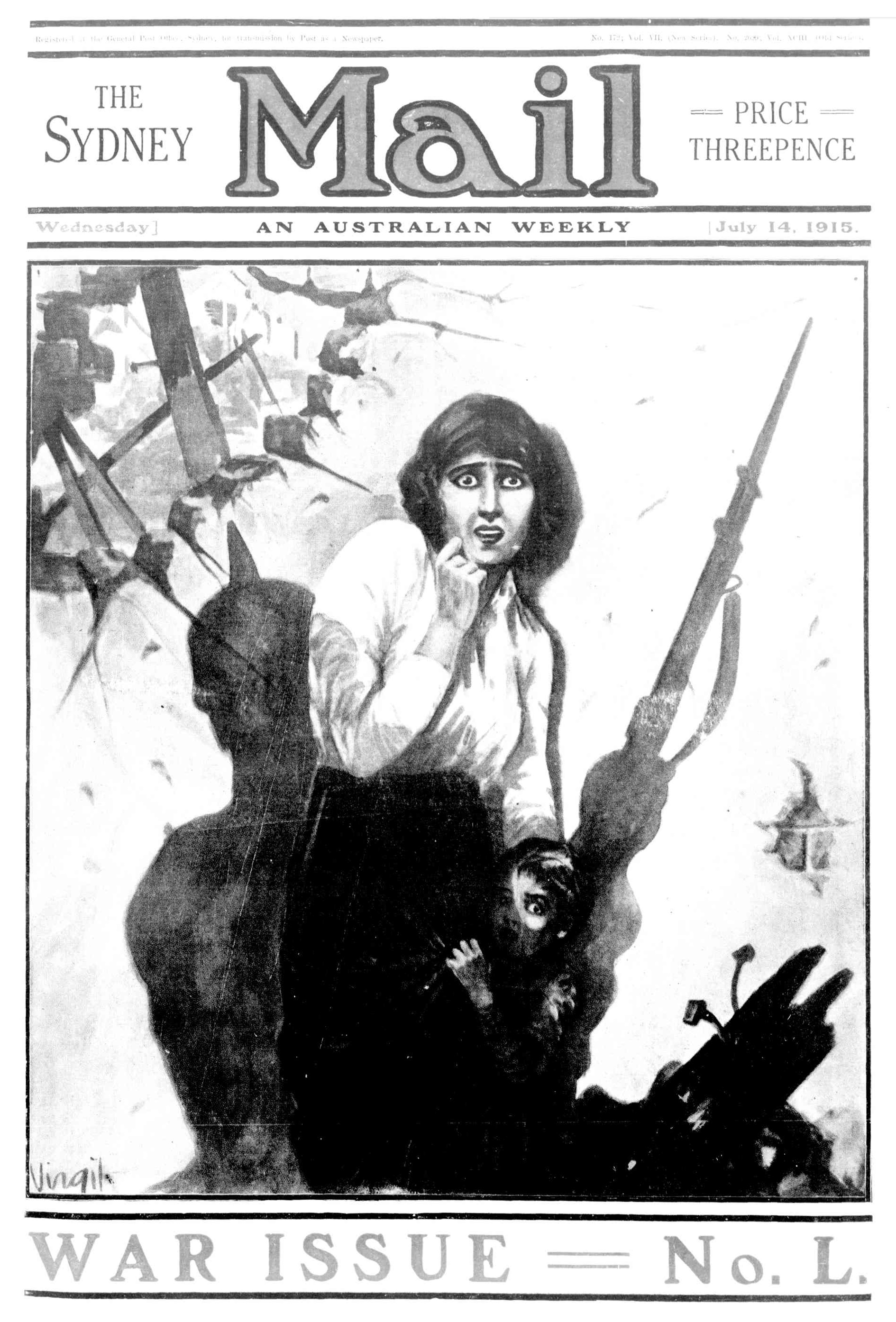
The cover of The Sydney Mail, 14 July 1915.

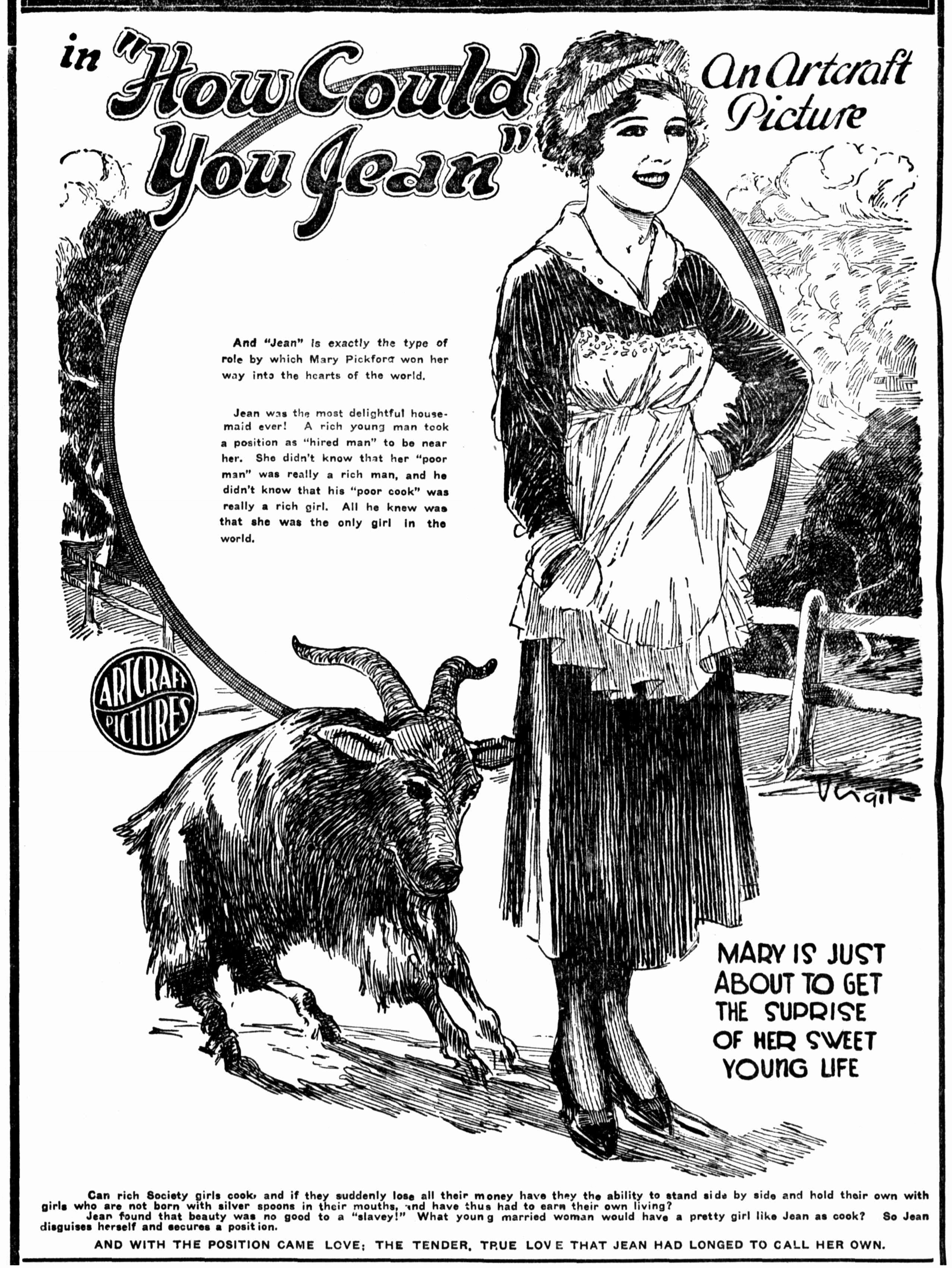
'How Could You Jean', movie advertisement, The Sun (Sydney), 8 August 1920.

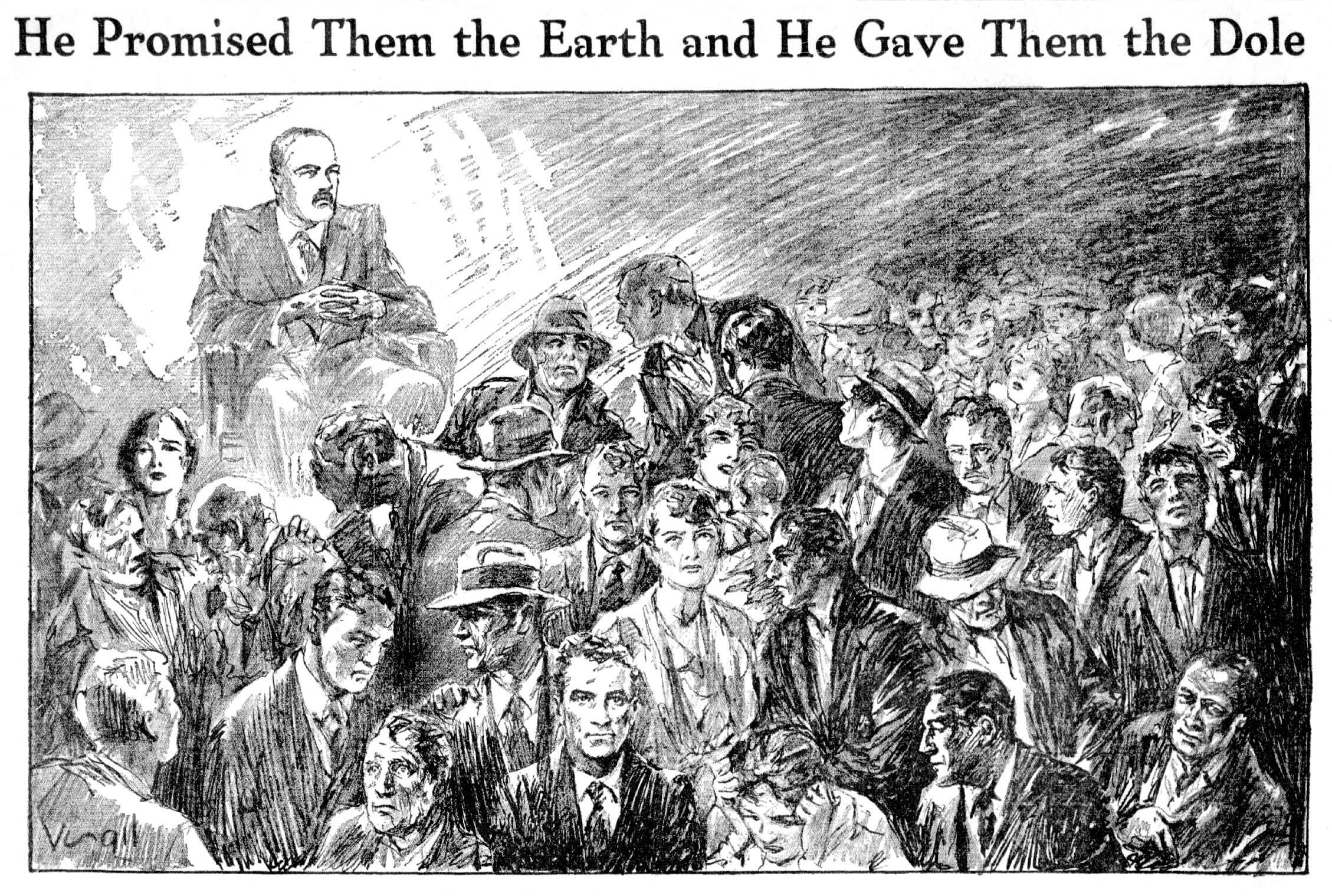
'He Promised Them the Earth and He Gave Them the Dole' (Smith's Weekly, 18 July 1931); featuring a drawing of Jack Lang, Premier of New South Wales during the Great Depression.

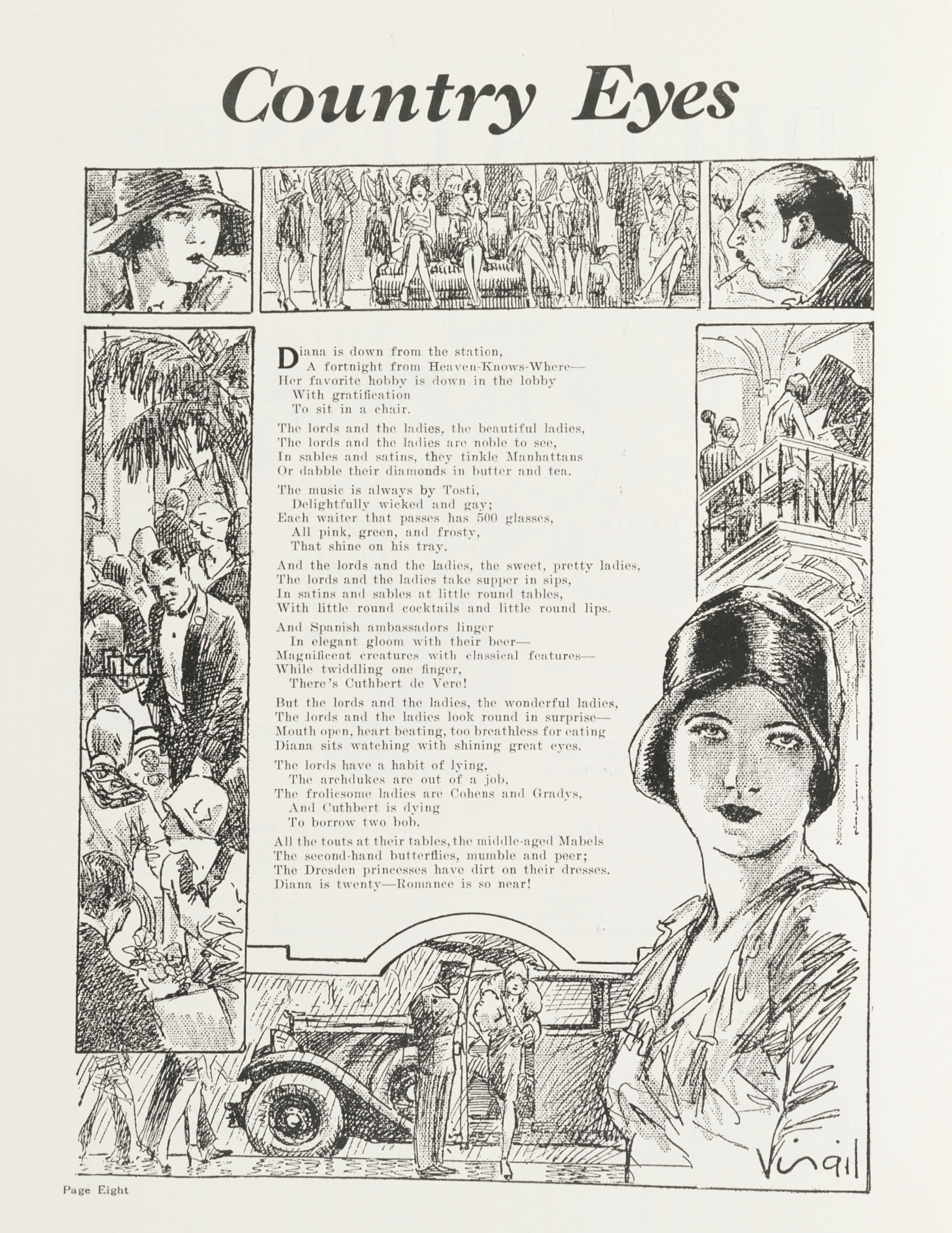
'Country Eyes', page 8 of Darlinghurst Nights by Kenneth Slessor (poetry) and Virgil Reilly (illustrations), published in 1933.

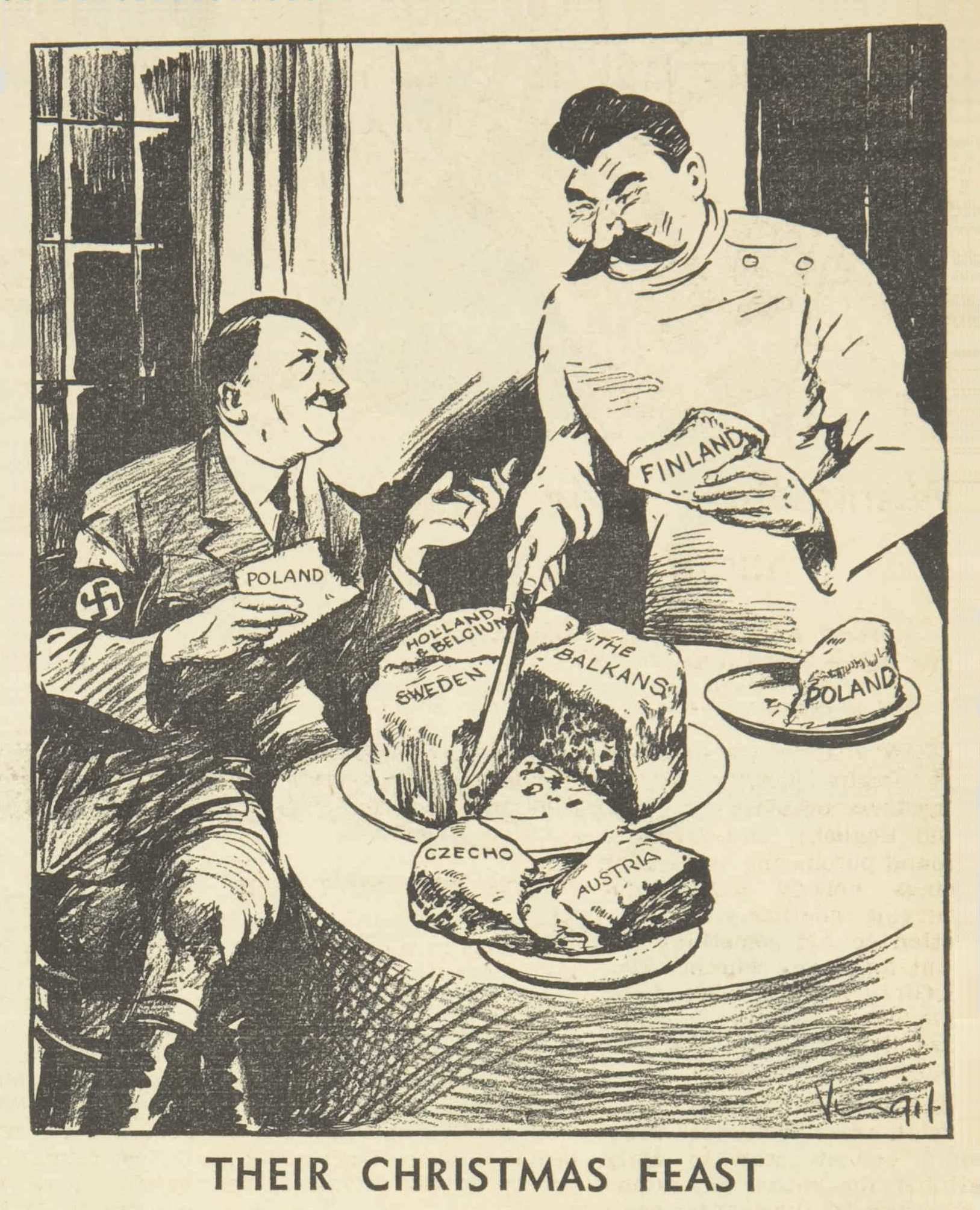
'Their Christmas Feast', political cartoon published in The Australian Women's Weekly, 23 December 1939.

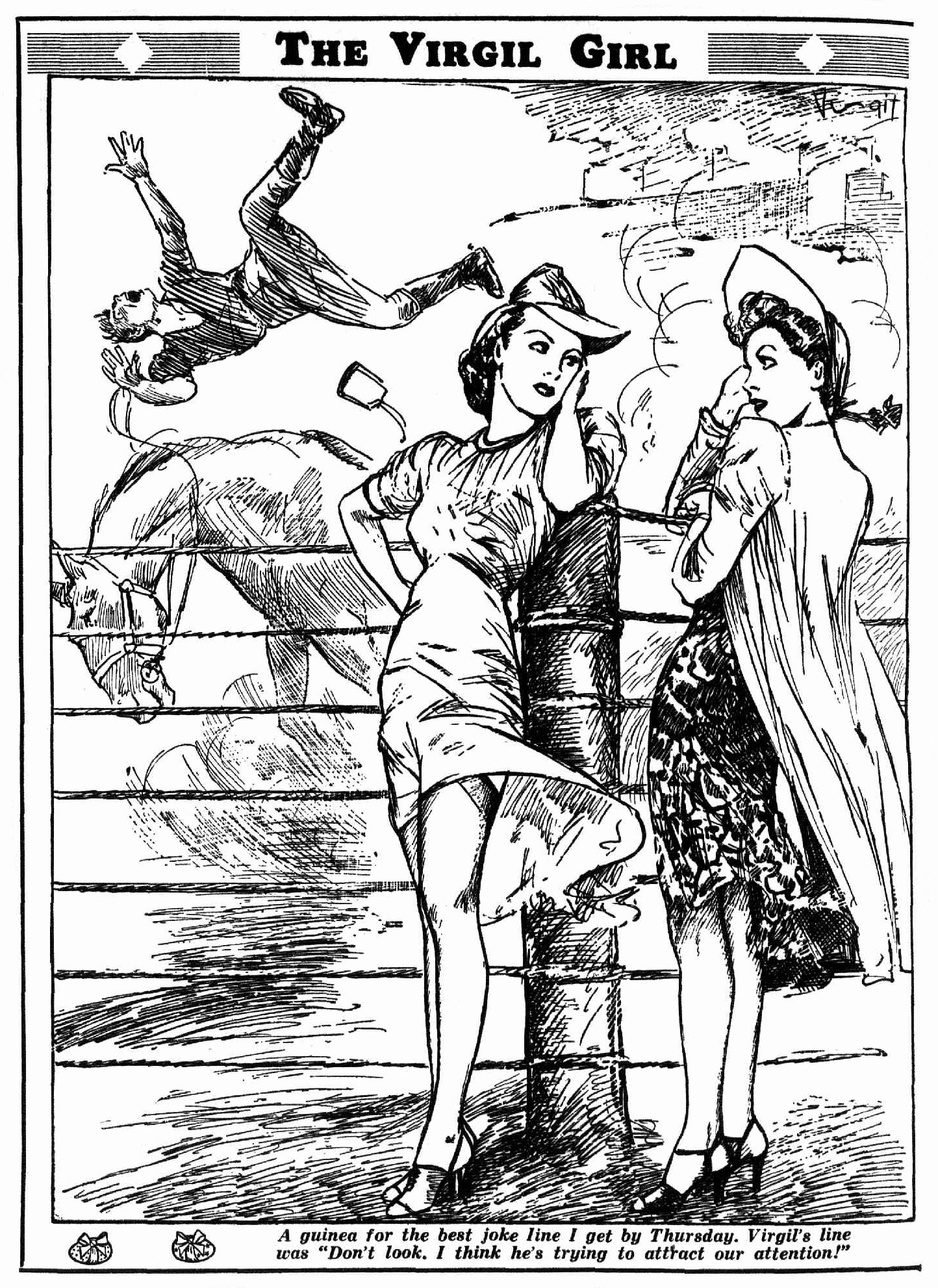
'The Virgil Girl': "Don't look. I think he's trying to attract our attention!" [published in The Daily Telegraph (Sydney), 13 April 1941].

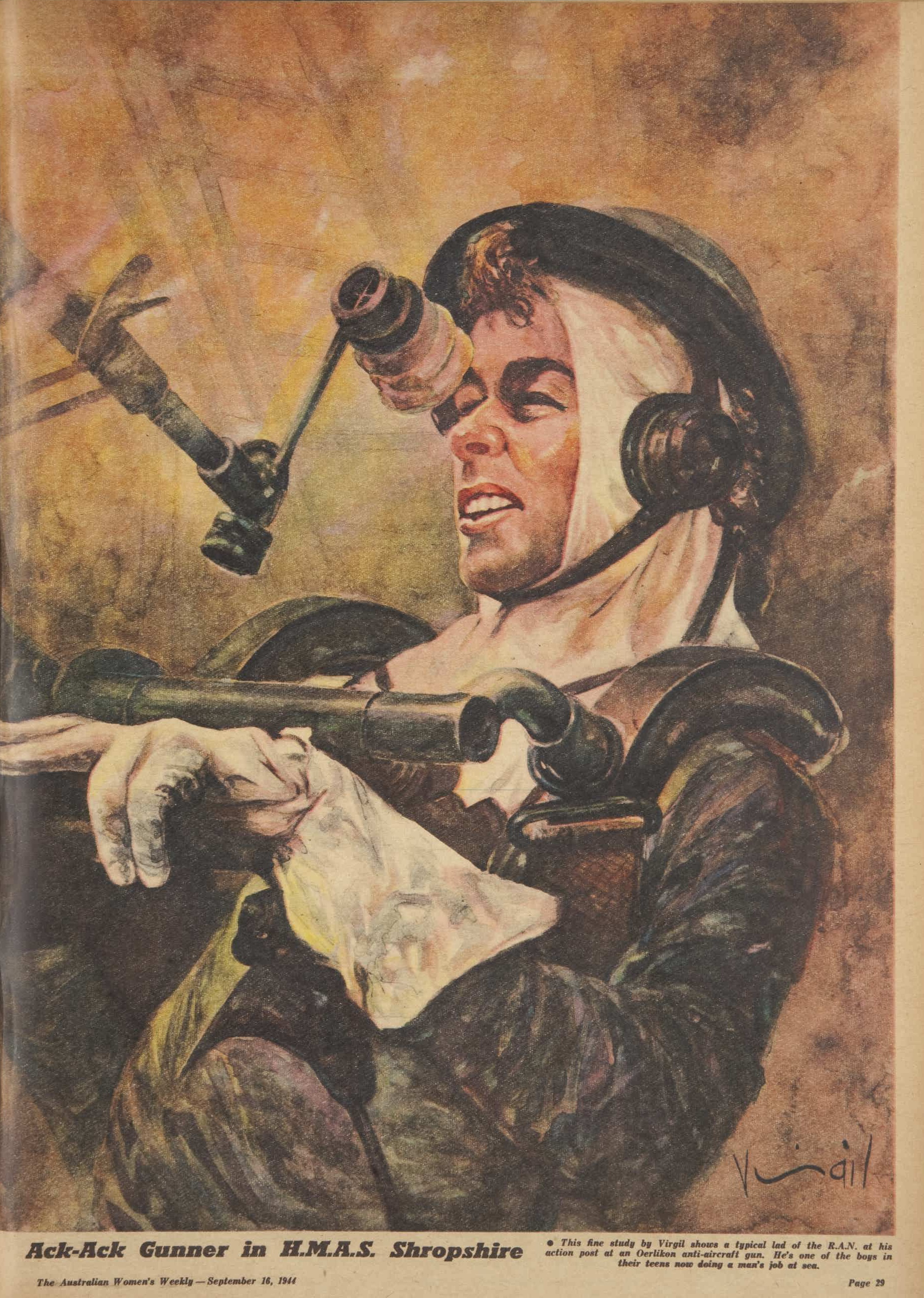
'Ack-Ack Gunner in H.M.A.S. Shropshire', published in The Australian Women's Weekly, 16 September 1944.

== Publications ==
- Kenneth Slessor & Virgil Reilly (1931), Darlinghurst Nights and Morning Glories: Being 47 Strange Sights Observed from Eleventh Storeys, in a Land of Cream Puffs and Crime, by a Flat-Roof Professor: and here set forth in Sketch and Rhyme, Sydney: Frank C. Johnson (ISBN 978-0-207-14246-8).
- Frank Clune (author) & Virgil Reilly (illustrator) (1955), Martin Cash: The Last of the Tasmanian Bushrangers, Sydney: Angus and Robertson.
- Frank Clune (author) & Virgil Reilly (illustrator) (1956), Captain Melville, Sydney: Angus and Robertson.
- Frank Clune (author) & Virgil Reilly (illustrator) (1957), Scandals of Sydney Town.
- Kenneth Slessor (author); Julian Croft (ed.); Virgil Reilly, Frank Dunne & Joan Morrison (illustrators) (1983), Backless Betty from Bondi, Sydney: Angus & Robertson (ISBN 978-0-207-14494-3). A compilation of poems by Slessor, originally published from February 1928 to November 1933 in Smith's Weekly, with artwork by Reilly and two other Smith's Weekly artists; a companion volume to Darlinghurst Nights.

== Notes ==
A.Fordyce Wheeler married Dorothy Reilly (née Williamson) on 26 June 1934, "little more than an hour" after the decree absolute was granted which finalised her divorce from Virgil Reilly. The couple were married in the Woollahra Registry Office, followed by a "wedding breakfast" at the Hotel Australia. During the festivities at the hotel a telegram from Reilly arrived for his former wife, which read: "Wishing you every happiness. 'Destiny' was a great waltz in its day". Dorothy and Fordyce Wheeler had one child from the marriage. A. F. Fordyce Wheeler died at St. Vincent's private hospital in Sydney in February 1937, aged 68 years, after an operation to amputate his left leg ("which had been troubling him for some time"). Dorothy Wheeler married two more times: in January 1940 to Dr. James Collins (who died in February 1942) and in November 1944 to Thomas Gilchrist. Dorothy Gilchrist died in June 1954 at Hurstville.

B.The figures in Reilly's October 1939 Woman's Weekly cover were based on actual people, modelled for the painting by the artist's second wife, Petah King (Reilly) and three servicemen (one of whom was Reilly's eldest son). Each of the three young men painted by Reilly did not survive the war. Squadron-Leader Arthur Norman Hick died of injuries received in an aircraft accident in England in June 1941. Leading-Seaman Charles Henry Bruce was a gunlayer on the British troop transport Ceramic, which was sunk by a German U-boat in the Atlantic in December 1942, with all hands lost. Reilly's eldest son Gavan had joined the A.I.F. and was killed in December 1942 during an attack on a Japanese defensive position near Buna in New Guinea.

C.Reilly's marriage in 1950 to Florence ('Anna') Shanahan (née Collins) was his third and final marriage. Several references claim Virgil Reilly married five times (for example, Kerr), but this is unsupported by the facts. During the 1972 oral history recording by Hazel de Berg, Reilly himself states he was married three times (refer 0m:55s, Session 1).
