= Peter Chapman (cartoonist) =

- Born: Peter Thomas Chapman; 23 April 1925; Cammeray, New South Wales, Australia
- Died: 22 June 2016 (aged 91); Narrabri, New South Wales, Australia
- Occupations: Artist, cartoonist, illustrator
- Writing career
- Period: 1944–1971

Peter Chapman (23 April 1925 – 22 June 2016) was an Australian comic book writer and illustrator. His most notable works were The Phantom Ranger, The Shadow and Sir Falcon.

Peter Thomas Chapman was born in Cammeray, North Sydney on 23 April 1925. He began drawing at age seven, when he was diagnosed with polio, and eventually studied art at East Sydney Technical College. At the college he met Phil Belbin and studied under William Dobell, Edmund Arthur Harvey, Lyndon Dadswell, Douglas Dundas and Geoffrey Keith Townsend.

In 1944 he was employed by Frank Johnson Publications, where he produced numerous comic strips including Jungle Patrol, Steve Conrad, Rocky Ned, Diana Hastings and Captain Jerry Winter, which appeared in Magpie Comics. Captain Jerry Winter, was initially an independent cargo ship operator before the character transitioned to Gem Comics where changed into a science fiction theme, running for over two dozen issues. Chapman's early works showed his inexperience however improved over time, to his covers for later issues of Gem Comics. Chapman took over the writing of The Invisible Avenger from French writer, Eddie Brooker, and after six issues the illustration work from Virgil Reilly due to workload pressures, where it was renamed Invisible Avenger Comics and included a number of other Chapman-created strips including The Blue Ghost and Cometman. The Invisible Avenger/Invisible Avenger Comics ran for 26 issues until 1952.

Chapman also worked for K.G. Murray Publishing Company on titles such as Derek Prentice before eventually became a freelance comic artist with Frew Publications, where he took over the writing and illustration of The Phantom Ranger. The Phantom Ranger was originally created by British expatriate artist, Jeff Wilkinson, and released in October 1949. The Phantom Ranger became the basis for a 1952 radio serial starring Charles ‘Bud’ Tingwell. In the early 1950s Chapman took over the writing and drawing of The Shadow, another creation by Wilkinson (the first issue of which was published in May 1950 by Frew and the final issue, #76 in December 1960). He worked on artwork The Phantom in the 1950s and 1960s. Chapman also created, wrote and illustrated Sir Falcon, which was heavily based on the Phantom. Sir Falcon was first published in August 1954 and ran for 55 issues until 1963. He also illustrated a number of other short-lived titles for Frew, including The Green Skeleton, Suicide Squad, Scoop Scott and Go-Bal - King of the Jungle.

Chapman left Frew in the early 1960s, turning to illustration, and becoming a designer at John Sands, illustrating greeting cards, games and calendars. In 1971, he moved to Narrabri, where he built himself a house and studio. He continued to work freelance, and also taught at the local TAFE college. In April 2016 he was inducted into the Australian Comics Hall of Fame and presented with a Ledger Award for his lifetime contributions to the Australian comic book industry.

Chapman died on 22 June 2016, at his home in Narrabri, at the age of 91.
