= Peter van Straaten =

Dutch cartoonist and comics artist (1935–2016)

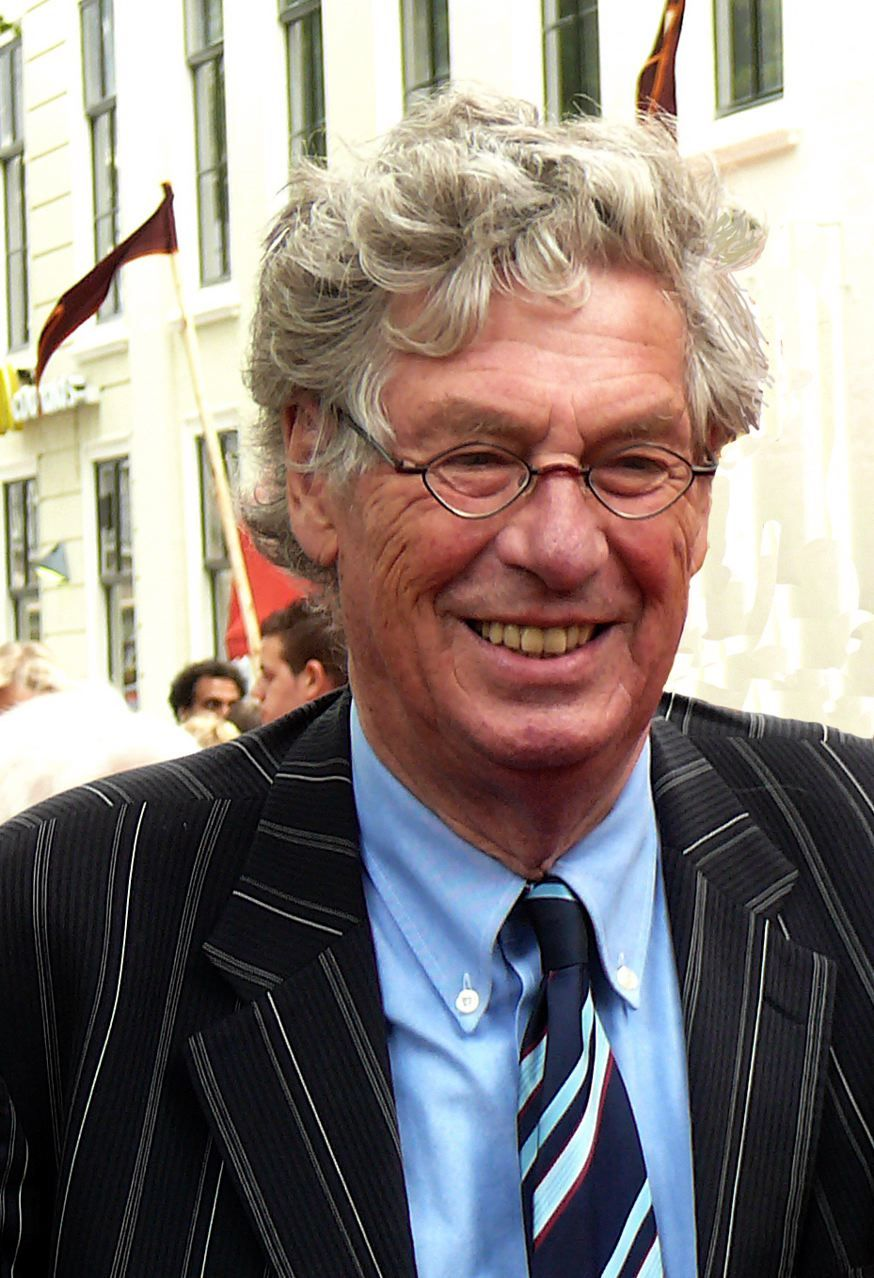
- Born: 25 March 1935; Arnhem, Netherlands
- Died: 8 December 2016 (aged 81); Amsterdam, Netherlands
- Occupations: Cartoonist; comics artist
- Years active: 1958–2016
- Known for: Vader & Zoon

Peter van Straaten (25 March 1935 – 8 December 2016) was a Dutch cartoonist and comics artist. He is best known for his political cartoons as well as his satirical observations of everyday people. He also had a newspaper comic strip Vader & Zoon, which ran in Het Parool for almost two decades.

== Biography ==
Van Straaten was born in Arnhem in the Netherlands on 25 March 1935. His elder brother Gerard also became a well-known illustrator. Van Straaten studied at the Gerrit Rietveld Academie in Amsterdam and started his career on 26 July 1958 for the Dutch newspaper Het Parool, where he illustrated news reports. Later he also drew political cartoons. From 1968 to 1987 he published a daily comic strip, Vader & Zoon (Father and Son), which became a huge success and inspired a television series.

Van Straaten is best known for his gag cartoons based on observational comedy. His series Dagelijks Leven (Daily Life) depicts people in amusing recognizable everyday situations. The series Doe ik 't goed? (Am I doing well?) centered on gags about people having sex and men usually having trouble satisfying their female partners. Between 1984 and 2000 he drew a weekly comic strip about a single woman called Agnes. His work was featured in comic books and a yearly calendar, Peter's Zeurkalender (Peter's Nagging Calendar, a pun on the word zeuren (to nag) and scheurkalender (a calendar where one can rip off one page a day to read a joke)). Van Straaten's cartoons have been published in Het Parool, Humo, Penthouse and Vrij Nederland.

== Later life and death ==
In February 2012, Van Straaten announced that he was no longer drawing cartoons for Het Parool. Two years later, in July 2014, he also cancelled his weekly cartoon for Vrij Nederland. He announced his retirement on 2 August 2016 and died four months later on 8 December in Amsterdam, at the age of 81.

== Awards ==
He won the 1983 Stripschapprijs and also won the Inktspotprijs five times, in 1994, 1997, 2003, 2011 and 2016. In 2006, he received the Gouden Ganzenveer, in 2009 he was appointed a Knight in the Order of the Netherlands Lion and in 2010 he won the Jacobus van Looyprijs. He received an honorary doctorate from Leiden University in 2011.
