= Bernard Cookson =

- Born: 3 January 1937; Manchester, England
- Died: 26 January 2016 (aged 79)
- Known for: Satirical cartoons; regular contributor to Punch magazine
- Spouse: Franky Cookson
- Website: cooksonscartoons.com

Bernard Cookson (3 January 1937 – 26 January 2016) was a British cartoonist and illustrator.

== Early life ==
Bernard Cookson was born in Manchester, England in 1937.

== Career ==
Shortly after attending the Manchester School of Art from 1953 to 1956, Cookson became a visualizer for an advertising company. He worked as an RAF Photographic Interpreter while deployed in Cyprus during his National Service.

Cookson saw his first cartoon published in 1965, in the Daily Mirror. He took over Eric Burgin’s TV strip, The Nightelys, after the illustrator died in 1966. Cookson's cartoons were published in many publications including the London Evening News, the Sporting Life, the Daily Express, the Sun, the Mail on Sunday, The Oldie and The Spectator. He was also a regular contributor to Punch. He has written comedy sketches for The Two Ronnies, Dave Allen and Tommy Cooper, alongside fellow cartoonist Stan 'Mac' McMurtry. Cookson illustrated for over 20 books by various authors, such as Maria Perry, William Donaldson, and John Timpson. He published and illustrated for his own books, Wine Lovers and ‘Til Divorce Us Do Part. He published his last novel, The Fifth Day, in 2009.

Cookson said of his work: "One of the most common questions people ask is: 'do you do the captions as well?' Perhaps they imagine that I just draw a picture, in the hope that it will become funny if someone puts a suitably funny caption below".

Bernard Cookson died in January 2016, after a long battle with cancer. He is survived by his wife Franky, and a son in Perth, Australia.
