= The Shadow (Frew Publications) =

Australian comic title

The Australian Shadow comic book was first published in May 1950 by Frew Publications and ran for two series in Australia. The final issue in the second series was #168, which makes The Shadow the second longest-running comic title in Australia.

The Shadow is a London-based crime fighter who is the secret identity of Jimmy Gray. Jimmy Gray had the additional identity of Limpy Olsen, a member of the underworld.

The character was created by Jeff Wilkinson, who wrote and drew the first 12 issues of the first series. From issue #13, the title was written and drawn by Peter Chapman. The initial series was cancelled with issue #23, but a second series was launched in 1955, starting the numbering from #1.

Peter Chapman was again the artist and writer for this new series from the first issue until #63 in 1959, when he left Frew Publications. From #64, the title reprinted previously published stories by Chapman and Wilkinson. From #74, the publisher was listed as Tricho Publications, and from #157, the publisher was Page Publications.

The Shadow was also translated into Portuguese and reprinted in La Selva's Selecoes Juvenis, where he was known as "O Sombra". Reprints and new stories were also included in RGE's Aguia Negra comic.

In 2017, reprints of older stories began in a new series of Giantsize Phantom, with new adventures starting in issue #6
