= Núria Pompeia =

Spanish journalist, writer and literary critic

Núria Vilaplana i Buixons (1931 – 25 December 2016), better known as Núria Pompeia, was a Catalan Spanish cartoonist, graphic humorist, journalist in the Catalan and Castilian languages, and a Catalan writer in Catalan.

Born and raised in Dreta de l'Eixample neighborhood, she studied art at the Escola Massana in Barcelona. She published her first cartoons in Oriflama in 1969. Her drawings often denoted social class, the bourgeoisie, or criticism of sexism. In more laid-back humor magazines, she also depicted censorship in a comic manner. Pompeia published novels and short stories, and worked in journalism. She died in Barcelona on 25 December 2016, aged 85.

== Selected works ==
=== Comics and graphic humor ===
- Maternasis, 1967
- Y fueron felices comiendo perdices , 1970
- Pels segles dels segles, 1971
- La educación de Palmira, 1972
- Mujercitas, 1975
- Cambios y Recambios, 1991

=== Narrative ===
- Cinc cèntims, 1981 (short stories)
- Mals endreços, 1997 (short stories)
- Inventari de l’últim dia, 1986 (novel)

== Awards ==
- 2000: Gold Medal of the City of Barcelona for Artistic Merit
- 2007: Creu de Sant Jordi
