= WES Feminist Comic Con =

The WES Feminist Comic Con is an annual event held by the Women Empowerment Society from Forman Christian College in Lahore, Pakistan. The two day event focuses on bringing together fans from around the country, with a focus on celebrating women, either as the characters or as the creators in comic books, films, and other forms of media. The WES Feminist Comic Con first took place on 2 November 2016, at Forman Christian College, and is scheduled to take place again on 17 and 18 November 2017.

== History ==
The WES Feminist Comic Con was first organised by the Women Empowerment Society at Forman Christian College in 2016. The event featured several events, including panels discussing comic books and feminism with writers, actors, and illustrators. In addition, the Comic Con featured several stalls, gaming opportunities, and events for fanart and cosplaying purposes. The event received support and was overall successful.

== Locations ==
Number	Date	Location	Guests	Notable Events
1	2-3 November 2016	Forman Christian College	Meesha Shafi; Khaya Ahmad; Moneeza Burney; Nigar Nazar; Amna Saleem; Maria Khan; Wasiq Harris	Panels; Fandom Trivia, Fan Art Competition; Cosplay Competition; Video Gaming
2	17-18 November 2017	Forman Christian College	Maria Unera; Noman Mateen; Khaya Ahmed; Mehreen Arsalan	Panels; Fandom Trivia; Scavenger Hunt; Open Mic; Cosplay Competition; Video Gaming; Meme War; Lip Sync Battle; Workshops
