= Frank Modell =

American cartoonist (1917–2016)

- Born: Franklyn Bruce Modell; September 6, 1917; Philadelphia, US
- Died: May 27, 2016 (aged 98); Guilford, Connecticut, US
- Education: Philadelphia Museum School of Industrial Art
- Occupation: Cartoonist
- Known for: contributed over 1,400 cartoons to The New Yorker

Franklyn Bruce Modell (September 6, 1917 – May 27, 2016) was an American cartoonist who contributed over 1,400 cartoons to The New Yorker during a period of over 50 years from 1946.

Franklyn Bruce Modell was born on September 6, 1917, in Philadelphia. During his childhood, he discovered his passion for drawing and sketching, a fascination that intensified during a period of quarantine due to scarlet fever. Following his graduation from West Philadelphia High School, Modell initially aimed to pursue a career in illustration.

He was a graduate of the Philadelphia Museum School of Industrial Art, after which he served in the US Army in World War II in a signal radio intelligence company as a sergeant.

Frank Modell embarked on a career as a freelance illustrator, cartoonist, and writer. His breakthrough came when he caught the attention of Jim Geraghty, the art director of the New Yorker, who recognized Modell's potential after reviewing his cartoon samples.

Modell died on May 27, 2016, at his home in Guilford, Connecticut.
