= Vader & Zoon =

Dutch newspaper gag-a-day comic strip

Vader en Zoon
- Vader (left) and Zoon (right)
- Author(s): Peter van Straaten
- Current status/schedule: Terminated.
- Launch date: November 12, 1968
- End date: 1987
- Syndicate(s): Het Parool
- Genre(s): Gag-a-day, Humor comics, Satirical comics

Vader & Zoon (Father & Son) was a Dutch newspaper gag-a-day comic strip, drawn by Peter van Straaten. It was published in Het Parool from November 12, 1968 until 1987 and Van Straaten's most famous and popular work.

== Concept ==
Vader & Zoon centers around a conservative, square father and the generation gap between him and his progressive, intellectual, socially conscious young son. It captured the zeitgeist of the late 1960s and early 1970s and poked fun at many political and social themes. Apart from the father and son there were no notable recurring characters. The strip was published in a text comics format, being one of the last Dutch comics to be so, as the format lost popularity in the 1960s.

Originally the strip was published weekly, but due to its popularity it started appearing three times a week and eventually daily. The cartoons were published in pocket books by company Van Gennep.

== Adaptations ==
Vader & Zoon was so popular at the time that the Dutch TV channel AVRO adapted it into a TV sitcom in 1974. Guus Hermus played the part of Vader, while Gees Linnebank acted as his son.
