= Víctor Mora (comics) =

Spanish comic book writer

- Born: 6 June 1931; Barcelona, Spain
- Died: 17 August 2016 (aged 85); Barcelona, Spain
- Occupation: Comic book writer

Víctor Mora (6 June 1931 – 17 August 2016) was a Spanish comic book writer.

Born in Barcelona, Mora created and wrote the series Capitán Trueno, El Jabato, Dani Futuro (art by Carlos Giménez), El Cosaco Verde, and El Corsario de Hierro, Chroniques de l'innomé Collection Pilote, drawn by Luis García.

== Sources ==
- (in Spanish) Entrevista con Víctor Mora
