= Capitán Trueno =

Publication information
- Publisher: Editorial Bruguera
- First appearance: 1956
- Created by: Víctor Mora; Miguel Ambrosio Zaragoza

El Capitán Trueno (lit. "Captain Thunder") is the hero of a series of Spanish comic books, created in 1956 by the writer Víctor Mora and illustrated mainly by Miguel Ambrosio Zaragoza (Ambrós). The comics were published continuously between 1956 and 1968, with Trueno eventually becoming the most popular Spanish hero comic of all time: at its height it sold more than 170,000 copies every week. The series was inspired by Hal Foster's Prince Valiant.

The character is depicted as a 12th-century knight-errant. His love interest is a Viking princess from Thule.

== Publication history ==
The comic was first published in 1956. Portions of the comic books have also been published in several Latin American countries, Italy (as "Capitan Tuono"), Greece (having its own title "ΤΡΟΥΕΝΟ", by Nikolaos Deligiorgis editions), Portugal and France. The series suffered some limited censorship during the dictatorship. Censors were concerned, for example, that Capitán Trueno and Sigrid were traveling around the world unburdened by matrimonial ties (vínculos matrimoniales).

== Characters and story ==
El Capitán Trueno is a 12th-century knight-errant, assisted by his faithful companions the cunning adolescent Crispín and the huge gourmand Goliath. His eternal dame is Sigrid of Thule, an energetic Viking princess who takes part in many of the adventures of the trio. In successive books, Capitán Trueno and his friends travel the whole world, while enforcing justice and freedom against bullies and tyrants. They never use more violence than necessary.

== In other media ==
=== Film ===
The character appears in the 2011 film Capitán Trueno y el Santo Grial (a.k.a. Captain Thunder and The Holy Grail), directed by Antonio Hernández, with actor Sergio Peris-Mencheta in the lead role.

=== Video game ===
A video game was released by Dinamic Software for the ZX Spectrum, Amstrad CPC and MSX.

== Popular culture ==
El Capitán Trueno has been the subject of several popular songs; by Asfalto, in their eponymous 1978 debut album, and by Spanish pop veteran Miguel Bosé in his song "El Hijo del Capitan Trueno" (Captain Thunder's Son) from his 2001 album Sereno.
