= Maurice Bramley =

New Zealand-born Australian cartoonist

- Born: Maurice William Bramley; 11 September 1898; New Plymouth, New Zealand
- Died: 15 June 1975 (aged 76); Canberra, Australian Capital Territory, Australia
- Occupations: Cartoonist, illustrator
- Writing career
- Period: 1934–1989

Maurice Bramley (11 September 1898 – 15 June 1975), was a New Zealand born Australian cartoonist and commercial artist.

== Biography ==
Maurice William Bramley was born in New Plymouth, New Zealand, on 11 September 1898, the eldest son of William Bramley. He migrated to Australia in the mid-1920s, settling in Sydney. Bramley came to prominence as a commercial artist/illustrator during the 1930s, working principally for Sun Newspapers (later Associated Newspapers) magazines such as The World's News and Woman and Woman's Budget, before commencing his long association with the Transport Publishing Company (later Horwitz Publications) during the mid-1940s. John Ryan, in his Australian Comic anthology, Panel by Panel, describes Bramley as a "meticulous draftsman, whose detailed pen work and realistic drawings were a cut above many of the illustrators in the field." During the Second World War Bramley worked for the Department of National Service producing recruiting posters. One of which 'Join Us in a Victory Job' (published in 1943), was subsequently used as a postage stamp in 1991.

After the conclusion of his magazine illustration work, Bramley turned to comics, illustrating scores of comic book covers (and short filler stories) for Horwitz Publications' range of comics. These comics were predominantly US reprints, ranging from war (Combat Kelly, Sgt. Fury and his Howling Commandos), westerns (Kid Colt, Two-Gun Kid) (published from the late 1950s) to superhero titles (published in the early 1960s), drawing the 'silver age' of Marvel superheroes, such as Iron Man, Thor and The Incredible Hulk.

As well as Horwitz and Page Publications comic covers, he worked on issues of Frogman, Navy Combat and The Phantom Commando, taking over the later from John Dixon. Dixon was only able to write the first three issues before handing the responsibility over to Bramley, who continued to draw it on an irregular schedule until 1965. Toby Burrows in Comics in Australia and New Zealand describes him as follows, "As a straight illustrator, Bramley, can more than hold his own with those artists mentioned above [ Monty Wedd, John Dixon, Hart Amos, Stanley Pitt, Vernon Hayles, Moira Bertram and Phil Belbin], and in some cases a lot better". Bramley later drew some entire issues of Page Publications' The Fast Gun in the early 1970s.

=== Personal ===
Bramley married Adele ('Dell') Violet Cox-Taylor on 19 August 1925, using her likeness for many of the women featured in his pulp novel cover illustrations. From the 1950s until the early 1960s Bramley lived in Tuross Head, on the New South Wales coast, where he used many of the residents as models for characters appearing within his comics. Bramley appears to have retired from the commercial art field by the early to mid-1960s, although examples of his comic book westerns remained in print (principally used as 'showbag fillers') until the early 1970s. Bramley moved to the Australian Capital Territory, for medical reasons, where he later died on 15 June 1975.
