= Air Hawk =

Air Hawk or variation, may refer to:

== Film ==
- Airhawk, a 1981 Australian film based on the comic Air Hawk and the Flying Doctors
- Air Hawks, a 1935 U.S. aviation science-fiction film
- The Air Hawk, a 1924 U.S. silent aviation adventure film

== Fictional characters ==
- Jim "Air" Hawk, the titular fictional character from Air Hawk and the Flying Doctors
- Jim "Airhawk" Hawk, the titular character from Airhawk

== Other uses ==
- Air Hawk and the Flying Doctors, Australian comic strip also known as "Air Hawk"

== See also ==
- Hawkair, Canadian regional airline
- Hawk Air, British air taxi firm operating from Ipswich Airport
- Hawk (disambiguation)
- Air (disambiguation)
