= Damn the torpedoes =

Damn the torpedoes may refer to:

- A quotation attributed to David Farragut, referring to an order given at the Battle of Mobile Bay
- Damn the Torpedoes (album), a 1979 album by Tom Petty & the Heartbreakers
- Damn the Torpedoes, a 1971 book by J. E. Macdonnell
- Damn the Torpedoes: Naval Incidents of the Civil War, a 1989 book by the son of Adolph A. Hoehling (homonym.)
- Damn the Torpedoes, a 1990 book by Paul Hellyer
