= TV Soap =

Fortnightly soap opera magazine

- The cover of the final issue
- Editor: Vesna Petropoulos
- Categories: Television, soap opera
- Frequency: Fortnightly (from 2000)
- Circulation: 149,000 (Dec 2019 – Dec 2020)
- Publisher: nextmedia
- Founder: Ben Mitchell
- First issue: September 1984
- Final issue: December 2020
- Country: Australia
- Based in: New South Wales
- Language: English
- Website: www.tvsoap.com.au
- OCLC: 899365890

TV Soap was a fortnightly magazine covering American, Australian and UK daytime and primetime soap operas, published in Australia. TV Soap was founded by Ben Mitchell and launched in September 1984, as a rival to TV Week. It was one of four magazines launched that year by Magazine Promotions. TV Soap followed a similar formula to Soap Opera Digest, which was published in the United States. After closing, TV Soap was relaunched in June 1989 and acquired by Horwitz Publications. With its circulation increasing, TV Soap proclaimed that it was "Australasia's No. 1 soap opera magazine" and several spin-offs were published, including Daytime TV. In 2000, Vesna Petropoulos was appointed editor and TV Soap went from being published monthly to fortnightly. For six years, the TV Soap Golden Boomerang Awards were held in California. nextmedia ceased publication of the magazine in 2020 and the last issue of TV Soap was published in December.

== History ==
TV Soap was first published in September 1984, priced at $1.50. It was one of 28 new magazines launched in 1984, and one of four published by Magazine Promotions, owned by John Fairfax and Sons. Its founding editor was journalist and writer Ben Mitchell. TV Soap joined the television magazine market and was an immediate rival to TV Week, which had a circulation of 845,000. They were also joined by TV Star which launched in December 1984. All three magazines covered commercial television and soap opera stars, with TV Soap following a similar formula to US magazine Soap Opera Digest. During the six months to September 1985, TV Soap had a circulation of 66,658 copies.

By 1989, the magazine had closed, however, in June of that year, TV Soap was relaunched, having been purchased by Michael Mohi's publishing group. It was later acquired by Horwitz Publications. By 1992, TV Soap had a circulation of 85,082. TV Soap and TV Hits had a combined circulation of 190,000, while their rival TV Week posted a loss of 145,803. By 1993, TV Soap claimed to be "Australasia's No. 1 soap opera magazine". It now featured both Australian and US soap opera news, lift-out posters, and news pieces about actors from Hollywood. Dennis Pryor of The Age thought the layout was similar to the "hectic rapidity of image-shift you get in television commercials." TV Soap's circulation was 82,386 in the audit released in 1994. After feedback from readers, Horwitz launched a spin-off titled Daytime TV, which covered daytime soaps, gossip and celebrities. It was also edited by Mitchell.

In 1996, the magazine's circulation had risen to 85,751. That year saw Australian actress Melissa Bell, who appeared in Neighbours and E Street, write a column for the publication in which she discussed her personal life and fellow actors. The magazine also hosted the TV Soap Celebrity Cruise, which sailed from Sydney Harbour with actors including Bell, Emma Harrison and Rebekah Elmaloglou on board. In 1998, TV Soap rose in circulation to 96,786 sales a month. During the year, nextmedia launched a competing magazine titled Soap World. Pop television magazines suffered a decline in circulation by 2000 and TV Soap fell ten per cent to 93,000. TV Soap now mostly featured articles on US soaps The Bold and the Beautiful, Days of Our Lives, and The Young and the Restless, but it also covered Australian and UK soaps. David Knox of TV Tonight observed that The Bold & the Beautiful featured on every cover.

Vesna Petropoulos was appointed editor of TV Soap in 2000, while Horwitz was acquired by nextmedia. The magazine also went from being published monthly to fortnightly. Petropoulos co-created the TV Soap Golden Boomerang Awards, which were held at the Beverly Wilshire Hotel until 2006. The awards celebrated the best of daytime soap operas and were voted for by readers. Other spin-off magazines were created, including Soap News, New Zealand TV Update, and 25 Years of The Bold and The Beautiful. By the end of 2016, TV Soap reached 186,000 readers, an increase of 34.8%.

On 27 November 2020, reporters for Mediaweek and TV Tonight confirmed that the 7 December 2020 Collectors Edition issue of TV Soap was its last. Nextmedia stated: "After what has been an amazing journey, the difficult decision has been made to cease publishing TV Soap in December 2020. The team would like to thank its loyal fans and readers who have made producing this magazine a reality over the last 30 years." From December 2019 to December 2020, the last year of its publication, TV Soap posted a 7.2% increase in readership for a final total of 149,000.
