= Phil Belbin =

- Born: Phillip Bertram Johstone Belbin; 9 August 1925; Beecroft, New South Wales, Australia
- Died: 1993 (aged 67–68)
- Occupations: Artist, cartoonist, illustrator, film producer
- Writing career
- Pen name: Humph; Fillini; Pittsburgh; Duke
- Period: 1940–1974

Phil Belbin (1925–1993) was an Australian artist, illustrator, cartoonist and amateur cinematographer. He is probably best known for creating what soon became known as the "Candy" multi-colour livery for the State Rail Authority in the 1980s. He is still regarded as one of Australia's leading steam enthusiasts, and had an extensive personal collection of several small steam locos; loco name plates; builder's plates and other railway memorabilia. His legacy lives on through his extensive film collection which he took in the final two decades of NSWGR steam.

== Biography ==
Phillip Bertram Johnstone Belbin, born in Beecroft, New South Wales on 9 August 1925. Belbin was a descendant of Lieutenant George Johnston, purported to be the first man ashore when the First Fleet arrived in Port Jackson in 1788. His great-grandmother, Margaret Peacock, with her husband, George Peacock established the business which was the fore-runner of the Henry Jones-IXL Jam business. His grandmother, Amanda 'Fanny' Johnston, donated £3,000 towards the building of Stanmore station. Belbin's father died when he was only three months old and he was raised by his mother and grandmother in Leura, before the family moved in 1932 to Cremorne Point.

As a young child he was said to have eagerly waited for butcher's deliveries, as he used the white wrapping paper to draw pictures on. Belbin was inspired by the works of Australian artist, Arthur Rackham, and saved money to purchase his books. At the age of eleven he produced his first comic book, Perry Dale. His first published work was a calendar for a metallurgist when he was thirteen. At fourteen he attended classes at the Black and White Club. Belbin studied art at East Sydney Technical College for two years, where his artwork impressed his teachers and the famous, controversial artist William Dobell. Belbin had further training for one year at Sydney's The Sun newspaper as an intern in 1942. Belbin enlisted in the Royal Australian Air Force in 1943 and served with the 77 Squadron, as an armourer, in the Pacific Islands during the Second World War.

Following his demobilisation in March 1946, he was recommended to publisher Frank Johnson by cartoonist and fellow artist, Peter Chapman. In 1946 Frank Johnson Publications published Belbin's first comic, The Raven. The Raven was a mysterious flyer 'whose name strikes terror into the hearts of criminals around the world'. The first issue of The Raven appeared in the Johnson comic, Triumph, in September 1946. Belbin drew Ace Bradley for the first issue of Gem Comics but this character gave way to additional stories of The Raven. He also illustrated the Bryant editions of Treasure Island and Little Women.

Belbin was then approached by the K.G. Murray Publishing Company (publishers of the Man magazine titles - an innocent 1950s version of Playboy Magazines), and in 1947 he began creating cartoons, comic strips and artwork for the company. The association with K. G Murray continuing for thirty years. In April 1948 K.G. Murray introduced comic strips, drawn by Belbin, based on the latest RKO Pictures, the first of which was The Secret Life of Walter Mitty. Others included The Bishop's Wife, Fort Apache, The Miracle of the Bells and The Velvet Touch. In April 1949 Belbin produced a new comic strip, The Adventures of Flash Cain (a private detective), with many of the scripts by Ray Heath. This was followed by Kath King of Kismet Cove (a female writer and reporter) in August 1951, scripted by Sydney Ockenden, which continued until October 1953. His other comic creations included Ace Bradley, Jimmy Smart (1957) and Peril on Venus(1948). Belbin was also a freelancer for other publishers and advertising agencies.

Belbin's work appeared in publications such as Reader's Digest, where he was the first Australian to illustrate Reader's Digest Condensed Books, and commissions from clients included Hawker De Havilland, the Flying Doctor Service, McDonnell Douglas, York Museum, the British National Railway Museum, Union Pacific Railroad, the State Rail Authority, and American Trains magazine. Belbin also fully illustrated a 75th anniversary history book for the Royal Australian Navy and provided illustrations for Biological Science : The Web of Life, a text book produced by the Australian Academy of Science.

Between the 1940s and the 1970s Belbin produced numerous cover illustrations for a variety of pulp fiction and paperback titles on behalf of Frank Johnson and Horwitz Publishing, including the Famous Detective, Surefire Western, Phantom and Star books.

In 1969 Belbin developed the newspaper strip, The Earlybirds, which centred on a team of flying, female trouble-shooters, most of the artwork from this comic eventually appeared as part of an Air Hawk adventure. In the 1970s he was the Art Director for Gredown Pty Ltd, run by Greg Murray (son of Kenneth G. Murray - K.G. Murray Publishing Company) painting covers for the company's range of science-fiction, western and horror comics.

In 1974 Belbin was awarded a 'Citation of Merit' by the New York Society of Illustrators and in 1984 he was elected as a fellow by the Royal Society of Arts, London.

In 1982 he was commissioned by State Rail Authority to introduce a new livery to all SRA fleet including their rolling stock. In 1990 he released his first video, Days of Steam : Authentic Workings on New South Wales Railways 1949-1970, a compilation of footage from his private film collection. This was followed by a posthumous release of a second video installation entitled Days of Steam 2 : The Final Years of Steam on NSW Railways, which his sons dedicated to him. His sons have subsequently released a number of rail videos, utilising footage captured by Belbin.

== Personal life ==
In November 1947, Belbin married Cecily Johnson and they had two sons, Graeme and Bruce. Belbin died in early 1993, at the age of 68, as a result of Motor Neurone disease.

== Bibliography ==
- Belbin, Phillip; Wheelahan, Paul (1940). The Raven. Young's Merchandising Co.
- Belbin, Phillip (1950). The Adventures of Flash Cain. K.G. Murray Publishing Co.
- Nash, Paul; Belbin, Phillip (1950). Jimmy Smart. K.G. Murray publishing Co.
- Wordley, Dick; Phil Belbin (Illustrator) (1953). Tasmanian Adventure. Adventure Productions.
- Stokes, Norman; Belbin, Phillip (Illustrator) (1977). The Ostrat Poems. Wentworth Books. ISBN 978-0-85587-110-9.
- Belbin, Phil; Burke, David (1982). Changing Trains - A Century of Travel on the Sydney-Melbourne Railway. Methuen Australia Pty. Ltd. ISBN 978-0-454-00369-7.
- Belbin, Phil; Burke, David (1986). Full Steam Across the Mountains. Methuen Australia Pty. Ltd. ISBN 978-0-454-00278-2.
- Gillett, Ross; Belbin, Phillip (1986). The Royal Australian Navy : the first Seventy-Five Years. Child & Henry. ISBN 978-0-86777-002-5.
- Bentley, James; Belbin, Phil (Illustrator) (1988). Black Smoke, Blue Mountains - The History of the Zig Zag Railway. Robert Brown & Associates. ISBN 978-0-949267-58-0.

== Videography ==
- Ricketts, Paul; Belbin, Graeme; Belbin, Phillip; Belbin, Bruce (1991). Days of Steam : Authentic Workings on New South Wales Railways 1949-1970. Australian Broadcasting Corporation : Video Selection Australia (Distributor).
- Belbin, Graeme; Belbin, Bruce; Belbin, Phillip (1998) Days of Steam 2 : The Final Years of Steam on NSW Railways Belbin Video
- Belbin, Graeme; Belbin, Phillip (2002). Pioneers of Film : NSW Railways 1954-1967. Belbin Video.
- Belbin, Graeme; Belbin, Bruce; Belbin, Phillip (2007) Film Night : Steam in NSW Belbin Video
- 3801 Belbin Video
- Diesel Revival : The Incredible Return of Vintage Diesels in the 21st Century Belbin Video
- Sight and Sound of Steam Belbin Video
- Belbin, Graeme; Belbin, Phillip (2011), Forgotten Films : A Priceless Record of Australian Steam in the 1940s and 50s from 16MM Kodachrome Film, Belbin Video
