= Moira Bertram =

Australian artist (1913–1993)

- Born: 1913; Sydney, Australia
- Died: 1993 (aged 79–80)
- Occupations: Comic book/strip artist, illustrator,
- Writing career
- Pen name: Bert
- Period: 1945–1950s

Moira Bertram (1913–1993) was an Australian comic book artist and illustrator.

== Life and career ==
Moira Bertram was born in Sydney in 1913, the daughter of a Sydney wool shipper. She studied portrait painting under the noted Australian painter Antonio Dattilo Rubbo (1870–1955) during which time she also began writing and drawing comic books for her own amusement.

"When I was at school…I made up my mind to draw and write them [comics]. I was always very successful."

Still in her teens, Bertram's first published work was the fantasy-styled adventure strip, Jo, which debuted in Sydney's Daily Mirror newspaper on 8 January 1945.

“[I have been drawing/writing comics] since I was fourteen – I told the publishers I was sixteen for fear they wouldn't publish them."

Jo was a dancer who, with the aid of a magic cape, assisted her boyfriend Serge, an American fighter pilot. The strip quickly established Bertram's reputation as a vivid and imaginative cartoonist, her work characterised by her granite-jawed heroes and voluptuous, glamorous women.

According to Kevin Patrick, Bertram was "Unlike many of her male counterparts of the time," and "from the outset grasped the dynamic storytelling possibilities of the comic book page. Huge panels, inventive compositions and dizzying perspectives dominate her page layouts (many of which were prepared by her sister, Kathleen), while her use of over-the-top sound effects anticipates the comic book paintings of 1960s 'Pop' artists like Roy Lichtenstein."

According to Ingrid Unger, "Bertram developed a striking visual style that included a skillful use of changing angles for dramatic and humorous effect." "Bertram's stories are action-packed, without being excessively violent, and often contain humour. They feature strong women and a variety of other female characters."

After finishing work on the Daily Mirror, she signed a three-month contract with publisher Frank Johnson in June 1945, with Jo & Her Magic Cape subsequently appearing in a range of Frank Johnson Publications during 1945–46.

"Moira was a proud attractive person and the strength in her work showed in her personality. She had never married and when the comics' scene finally died, she did portraits and magazine illustrations for a number of publishers."

In 1949, Moira and her sister Kathleen (who did the lettering) turned to self-publishing their comic book Red Finnegan, which ran for four issues. In the 1950s she worked for companies, including Horwitz Press, Invincible Press (The Thrilling Adventures of Dan Eagle (c.1954), Army and romance comics, Bring Back My Love (c.1956), Army (c.1956), Campus Snobs (c.1959) and Rivals in Love(c.1959)) and Calvert Publishing (pulp books). Bertram additionally illustrated covers for 'Carter Brown' novels, and contributed stories to the 'Silhouette Romance Library' (Reigate Pty Ltd). She ended her comic book career in the late 1950s.

Another of her comic book creations was Flameman, published by K.G. Murray Publishing Company in 1946, which documented the adventures of a super-powered 'genie of the sun'.

John Ryan in the comic book anthology, Panel by Panel describes Bertram's work as "highly stylised and confident; her experiments with perspective include placing large shapes in the foreground to enhance the visual drama of a story, and placing the reader above the action."

Bertram died in 1993.
