= Peter Newell (disambiguation) =

Peter Newell (1862–1924), was an American artist and writer.

Peter Newell may also refer to:

- Peter Newell (architect) (1916–2010), Australian architect
- Peter Francis Newell (1915–2008), American college men's basketball coach and basketball instructional coach
- Pete Newell (gridiron football) (born Peter Newell, 1949), American former professional football defensive tackle
