= Unk White =

Australian cartoonist (1900–1986)

Cecil 'Unk' White
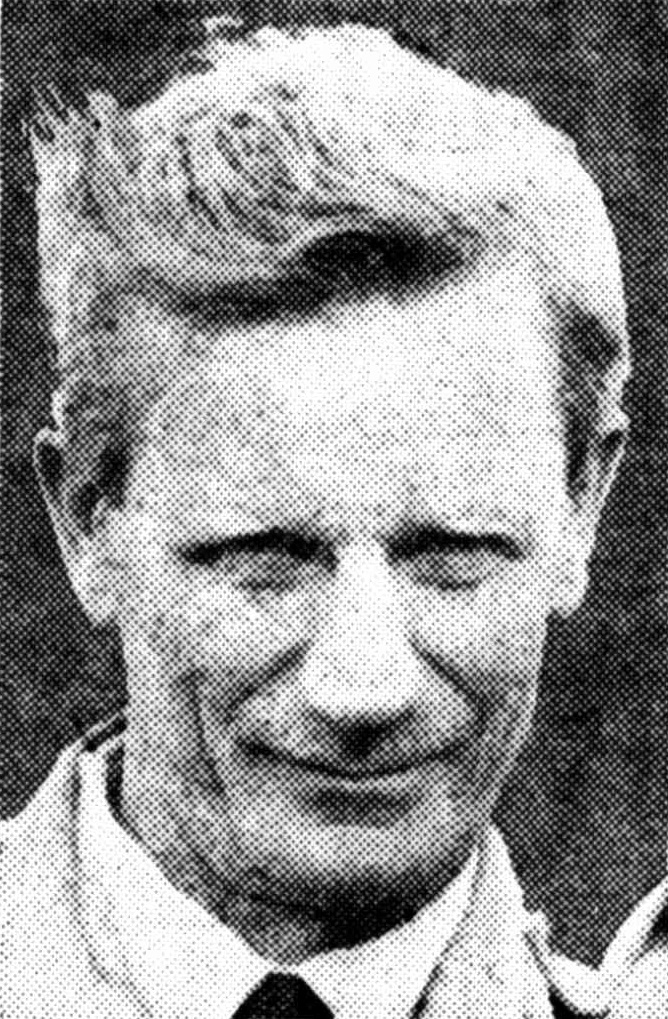
- 'Unk' White, photograph published in November 1947.
- Born: Cecil John White; 1900; Auckland, New Zealand
- Died: 6 March 1986 (aged 85–86); Sydney, Australia
- Occupations: Cartoonist, illustrator, artist
- Writing career
- Pen name: Unk

Cecil John White (1900 – March 1986), known under the pen name 'Unk' White, was an Australian cartoonist born in Auckland, New Zealand.

White came to Sydney in 1922 with the artists Joe and Guy Lynch and was soon immersed in the bohemian scene there.

He was a regular contributor to Australian magazines, notably Melbourne Punch and The Bulletin, also Smith's Weekly and Beckett's Budget.

White produced the comic strips, Freckles in 1928 and The Adventures of Blue Hardy for Pix magazine in 1938.

He was a foundation member of the Black and White Artists' Club and its first secretary.

In 1944 Unk was accredited as an official war artist and saw active service with the RAAF and Royal Navy in New Guinea, the Pacific and Japan.

He was also a highly regarded painter in watercolours.

From the late 1960s White drew many of the architectural drawings in the Rigby Sketchbook series.

== Publications ==
- Unk White's Laugh Parade Frank Johnson, Sydney 1940
- Unk White's Second Laugh Parade Frank Johnson, Sydney 1940
- Unk White's Giggles Pinnacle Press, Sydney 1943

Illustrations for The Sketchbook Series (published by Rigby Limited, Adelaide) included:

- The Rocks, Sydney by Olaf Ruhen, 1966
- Sydney Harbour Sketchbook by R. Sriber, 1968
- Auckland Sketchbook by M. H. Holcroft, 1969
- Norfolk Island Sketchbook by R. Sriber, 1969
- New England Sketchbook by Peter Newell, 1970
- Ballarat and Western Goldfields Sketchbook by John Béchervaise, 1970
- Bendigo and Eastern Goldfields Sketchbook by John Béchervaise, 1970
- Hawkesbury River Sketchbook by Frank Cayley 1970
- Blue Mountains Sketchbook by John Bechervaise, 1971
- Nineteenth Century Sydney Sketchbook by Tess van Sommers, 1974
- Paddington Sketchbook by Patricia Thompson 1975
- Queensland Sketchbook by Peter Newell, 1976
- Historic Sydney Sketchbook by Olaf Ruhen, Cedric Emanuel, Patricia Thompson, 1977 ISBN 0-7270-0276-7

== Oral history ==
An oral history interview with White, recorded in 1967, is available at the National Library of Australia.
