= Peter Newell (architect) =

Australian architect (1916–2010)

Peter Newell (1916–2010) was an Australian architect, who worked in the modernist tradition in Queensland and became an architectural critic.

== Early life and career ==
Peter Edward Newell was born on 30 September 1916 in Melbourne, Victoria. He trained as an architect in Melbourne, graduating with his B.Arch (with honours) from the University of Melbourne. He was a member of the editorial committee of the Royal Victorian Institute of Architects Students' Society journals, Smudges in 1937, along with Robin Boyd and Roy Simpson. In 1939 he proposed that work be reestablished on developing plans for small homes and this was picked up the Royal Victorian Institute of architects (RVIA) Small Homes Service (SHS).

== War Service ==
Newell enlisted in the Australian Army Engineers in 1942. He graduated from the School of Military Engineering in Sydney and then spent some of his military service during World War II in Queensland. He remained in Queensland following the War. He was discharged with the rank of Captain and married Betty Thelander in 1945.

== Architectural work in Queensland ==
Newell briefly worked for the firm of Addison and McDonald. He worked for Chambers and Ford, which later became Ford, Hutton and Newell in 1951 when he became a director in the firm. The partnership existed between 1951 and 1975. The Newell family moved to the suburb of St Lucia in Brisbane, where the University of Queensland had relocated. Newell used his own residence as a means of reaching clients attracted to his design aesthetic. He was instrumental in the modernist movement influencing the design of Queensland homes. He designed homes in Brisbane and the Gold Coast of Queensland with designs that were moving away from elevated Queenslanders to ones which were constructed on a slab, integrated indoor and outdoor living and used overhanging eaves to provide for outdoor terraces.

Newell lectured part time at the University of Queensland in the 1960s. Newell wrote several books describing the architecture of Queensland. Robin Boyd remarked that Newell introduced the Victorian tradition of painting exterior brickwork on Brisbane homes, influencing colour in homes in suburbs such as St Lucia.

== Later life ==
Newell took his master's degree in Architecture from the University of Queensland in 1988, with a thesis entitled The House in Queensland: From First Settlement to 1985.

He died on 21 May 2010 in Brisbane, Queensland.

Five boxes of Newell's papers are held in the University of Queensland Fryer Library. Many of his plans and drawings are held in the Fryer Library collection.

== Notable buildings ==
Christ Church, St Lucia (1949)

Winothulo, Roma - conversion to Memorial Club (1952)

Yindingi, 66 Channon St, Gympie (1959)

180 Harts Rd, Indooroopilly (1950s)

== Books ==
- Newell, Peter and White, Unk. (1967). Brisbane Sketchbook. Adelaide: Rigby.
- Newell, Peter and Jopson, Kevin. (1969). Gold Coast and Green Mountains Sketchbook. Adelaide: Rigby.
- Newell, Peter and White, Unk. (1970). New England Sketchbook. Adelaide: Rigby.
- Newell, Peter and Roberts, Ainslie. (1971). Tropical Sketchbook. Adelaide: Rigby.
- Newell, Peter and Jopson, Kevin. (1972). Darling Downs Sketchbook. Adelaide: Rigby.
- Newell, Peter, White, Unk, Jopson, Kevin and Roberts, Ainslie. (1976). Queensland Sketchbook. Adelaide: Rigby.
- Newell, P. (2001). The Art, Trade and Mystery of Building. Brisbane: Peter Newell.

== Other publications ==
Boyd, Robin and Newell, P. (1950). St Lucia: A Housing Revolution is Taking Place in Brisbane. Architecture, 106–109.

Newell, Peter. (1954). The Case for Contemporary Church Design. Church Chronicle, January 1, pp. 17–18.

Newell, P. (1959). Umbigumbi to the Gold Coast. Architecture in Australia, 48 (1), 70–73.

Newell, Peter. (1965). Rude Forefathers and Non Pedigree Architecture. Scarab, 1 (1).

Newell, Peter. (1969). The heritage architecture of Queensland. Journal of the Royal Historical Society of Queensland, 8: 737–747.

Newell, Peter. (1970). Development of the tropic house: Architecture in North Queensland. Journal of the Royal Historical Society of Queensland, 9(1): 162–168.

Newell, P. (1979). The origins and development of the Queensland house. Journal of the Royal Historical Society of Queensland, 10 (4), 18–28.
