= K.G. Murray Publishing Company =

Australian publishing company

- Founded: 1936
- Founder: Kenneth G. Murray
- Country of origin: Australia
- Headquarters location: Sydney
- Key people: Ken Murray; Chris Murray
- Publication types: Novels, comics, magazines
- Nonfiction topics: Sports, education
- Fiction genres: Crime, war, thrillers, romance, Western

K.G. Murray Publishing Company is an Australian publisher primarily known for its publication of DC reprint comics. Established in 1936 in Sydney, Australia by Kenneth "K. G." Murray, the company was a family-owned and run business until its sale to Australian Consolidated Press in 1973.

== History ==
Murray had previously worked in advertising for Gordon and Gotch, an Australian magazine distributor. Murray's first publication was Man, a men's magazine, in December 1936. It was printed on heavy art paper with thick, glossy card covers and squared spine. The 100 page magazine sold for the price of two shillings.

In 1936 K.G. Murray issued a pocket-sized magazine, Man Junior, a 96-page publication which sold for a shilling and contained no advertising. this was followed by The Insider, a serious foreign affairs journal (which was relatively short-lived), and Cavalcade, a more general-focus news digest. In 1938 K.G. Murray launched the Digest of Digests.

The commencement of World War II forced the suspension of Man Junior and Cavalcade, leaving only Man and Digest of Digests as K.G. Murray's only on-going publications. When the war ended Man Junior and Cavalcade resumed publication, but The Insider fell by the wayside.

In 1946 K.G. Murray introduced Adam, a pulp magazine of action, sport and adventure stories. The magazine blossomed over time and became noted for its lurid painted covers – many by Phil Belbin and Jack Waugh – featuring semi-naked women in various brands of peril.

The first edition of Australian House and Garden was in December 1948. It was put together in less than four months. The first editor was Beryl Guertner who was an enthusiast for interior design and gardening. She retired in 1973 when the company was taken over.

In 1951 K.G. Murray was spun off into Publishers Holdings Ltd, a company which was then floated on the Australian Stock Exchange.

In the 1950s Man and its stablemates came under terrible pressure as American girlie magazines flooded the Australian market. By then K.G. Murray had diversified into a range of titles covering a range of highly specialised areas of reader interest, ranging from hunting and fishing to motor racing and farming. For instance, the company purchased the Wheels automobile magazine in 1955. K.G. Murray also increased its number of men's magazine titles publishing Gals and Gags, Man's Life, Adventure Story and Man's Master Detective.

On 1 February 1972, Kenneth Murray retired as Managing Director while remaining on the Board until 1974. On 30 June 1973, Australian Consolidated Press Ltd completed an acquisition and took control of the company. In 1974 Man magazine ceased publication.

== Comics ==
In the late 1930s the Australian comic market began to be saturated by the release of reprints of US strips popularised by the women's magazines, The New Idea and The Woman's Mirror, together with reprints of Sunday pages and supplements, printed overseas at minimal cost. By 1939 there were political protests about the dumping of overseas magazines and comics in Australia, on behalf of the local industry and in June 1940 the Australian Government placed a ban on the importation of American comics and overseas syndicated reprints.

After the end of World War II, paper rationing was eased and US publication embargoes lifted. In 1946, K.G. Murray took advantage of these new opportunities and began publishing original Australian black and white comics. These included Flameman (c.1946), a superhero strip by Moira Bertram. High Compression (c.1947), an Italian Grand Prix mystery drawn by Albert De Vine and The Lost Patrol (c.1946), an adventure set in postwar New Guinea, written and drawn by Hart Amos.

In 1947, Murray introduced full colour content to Australian comics with Climax All Color Comic. The format was costly, but it established KG Murray and put pressure on its competitors. Early issues of Climax included Zatara tales (from US Action Comics), Murray's first DC super-hero reprints.

K.G. Murray also began publishing other US reprints such as Blackhawk and Captain Triumph. These characters whilst now associated with DC, were only acquired by DC after Quality Comics folded in 1956.

In mid-1947, Murray launched its first full DC reprint title, Superman All Color Comic, and went on to dominate the Australian comic reprint field. The series set new comic sales records in Australia, selling 150,000 copies at its peak. Within two years, the Color Comic description became the legendary branding for Australian black and white DC reprints. In 1949, Adventure Comics featuring Superboy was launched, but retitled Superboy from issue 6. The series reprinted the US Adventure Comics and Superboy.

Further new titles, Batman Comics (soon retitled Batman) and Super Adventure Comic, followed in mid-1950. Batman reprinted stories from Batman and Detective Comics, while Super Adventure Comic included Superman and Batman tales from World's Finest Comics, alongside Superboy stories

K.G. Murray also published reprints of DC Comics under a range of imprint titles including Climax Comics, Blue Star, Planet Comics and Murray Comics.

In 1959 the Australian government lifted import restrictions and US publications became available in Australia, resulting in the demand for locally produced American-style periodicals declining.

In 1973, Murray was acquired by Australian Consolidated Press (ACP) the publishing arm of the Packer empire. In 1974, Kerry Packer took control of ACP following his father's death. In 1979 a new short-lived "Murray Publishers" logo appeared, which was revamped into the "Murray the Cat" branding in mid-1980. In 1983, Kerry Packer purchased back all of the shares in ACP and turned it into a private company, selling the comics division to Federal Publishers.
