= Beryl Guertner =

Australian magazine editor and author

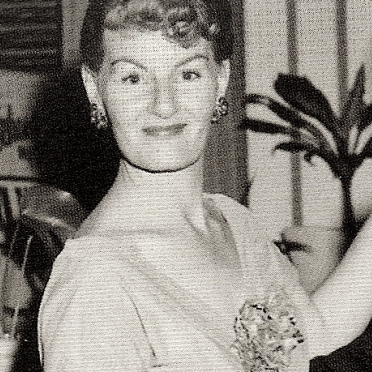
- in 1958
- Born: Beryl Annie Blanche Guertner; 22 October 1917; Paddington, New South Wales, Australia
- Died: 25 November 1981 (aged 64); Gosford, New South Wales, Australia
- Occupation: Magazine editor
- Employer: K.G. Murray Publishing Company
- Known for: Australian House and Garden
- Partner: Catherine (Kate) Warmoll

Beryl Annie Blanche Guertner (22 October 1917 – 25 November 1981) was an Australian magazine editor and author. She led Australian House and Garden for 25 years.

== Life ==
Guertner was born in 1917 in Paddington. Her parents were Maude (born Ireland) and her husband Eugene Henry Gürtner. Her mother was from Sydney and her father was a German immigrant cook and masseur. She was educated at a school in Wagga Wagga run by the Presentation Sisters. When she 21 she moved to the Sydney suburb of Mosman Bay and she went to work for the Daily Telegraph.

The first edition of Australian House and Garden was in December 1948. It was the idea of Ken Murray of the K.G. Murray Publishing Company and it had been put together in less than four months. The first editor was Guertner who was an enthusiast for interior design and gardening. The magazine championed the interior design advocate Marion Hall Best, the architects Robin Boyd and Harry Seidler and furniture designer Grant Featherston. The magazine included plans for complete small homes designed by W. Watson Sharp as well as suggesting the latest colours for interiors.

She was a member of the Society of Women Writers of New South Wales and she became its president in 1960. In the same year, her book Australian Book of Furnishing and Decorating was published.

Her magazine's long collaboration with the architect, W. Watson Sharp, led to, The Australian House and Garden Book of Orchids, a book by him that sold under the name of the magazine in 1969.

Guertner was editor of Australian House and Garden until 1973 when she retired. She had lived with Catherine (Kate) Warmoll from 1949 at Warrimoo. The two of them moved to live at MacMasters Beach beside Cockrone lagoon.

== Death and legacy ==
Guertner died in Gosford in 1981. An online version and a print edition of the magazine, she helped found, continues (2023).
