= Frank Johnson Publications =

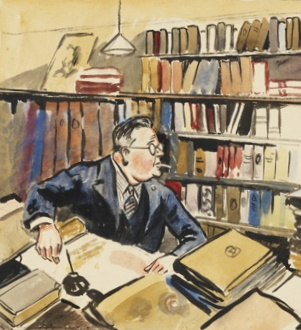
- Frank C. Johnson at his desk (c. 1945), bookplate caricature (detail) by N. M. Sherlock ('Lock').
- Founded: July 1941
- Founder: Frank Johnson
- Country of origin: Australia
- Headquarters location: Sydney, New South Wales
- Key people: Frank Johnson; A.C. Headley
- Publication types: Comics
- Fiction genres: science fiction, crime, adventure, war, super heros, thrillers, westerns
- Imprints: see list of titles below

Frank Johnson Publications was an Australian comic book and pulp magazine publisher in the 1940s and 1950s.

== History ==
=== Early publishing ventures ===
Frank Charles Johnson was born on 27 August 1898 at Glebe, the youngest of seven children of William Percy Johnson and Jeanne Amelie (née Turner).

Frank C. Johnson served in the A.I.F. during World War I, enlisting in September 1915. After the war had ended, before returning to Australia, Johnson worked for the London export bookseller, John Clark of 12 Ludgate Square, for three months from early May to early August 1919. Johnson's period of work experience in London was supported by the Australian military in order for him to receive clerical experience prior to his return to civilian life in Australia.

After returning from the war Johnson "entered the book-trade", finding a position with Dymock's Bookstore in Sydney. While still working for Dymocks, Johnson joined with Jack Lindsay and Kenneth Slessor to edit the quarterly literary journal Vision, which ran for four editions between May 1923 and February 1924. The poems and essays in Vision quarterly were ornamented by drawings of nymphs and satyrs by Norman Lindsay. The magazine served as a vehicle for an aesthetic philosophy supporting "the literary and artistic traditions rejected by European modernists". In December 1923 Johnson published an anthology called Poetry in Australia.

Frank Johnson married Adeleen Kathleen Rennix in 1926 in Sydney.

Johnson left Dymocks and launched his own publishing-business, at first under his own name and later as the Macquarie Head Press. Under these labels Johnson published a series of books by a number of Australian writers and artists. In late 1931 forty-one of Kenneth Slessor's poems, each of them illustrated by the artist Virgil Reilly and previously published in Smith's Weekly between 1928 and 1931, were published by Johnson in a single volume collection called Darlinghurst Nights. Johnson also published a book of lino cuts by the Melbourne artist, Jim Flett, as well as works by prominent Australian authors, including Dale Collins, Les Haylen, Dulcie Deamer, Lennie Lower, Les Robinson, W. S. Power, Colin Wills, Kurt Offenberg and J. A. R. McKellar.

In 1937 Johnson launched Tempo, a monthly magazine devoted "to music, stage, screen and dance-band news". In October 1937 Johnson was described as "perhaps Australia's most persistent publisher outside the bigger commercial houses".

=== Comic book publishing ===
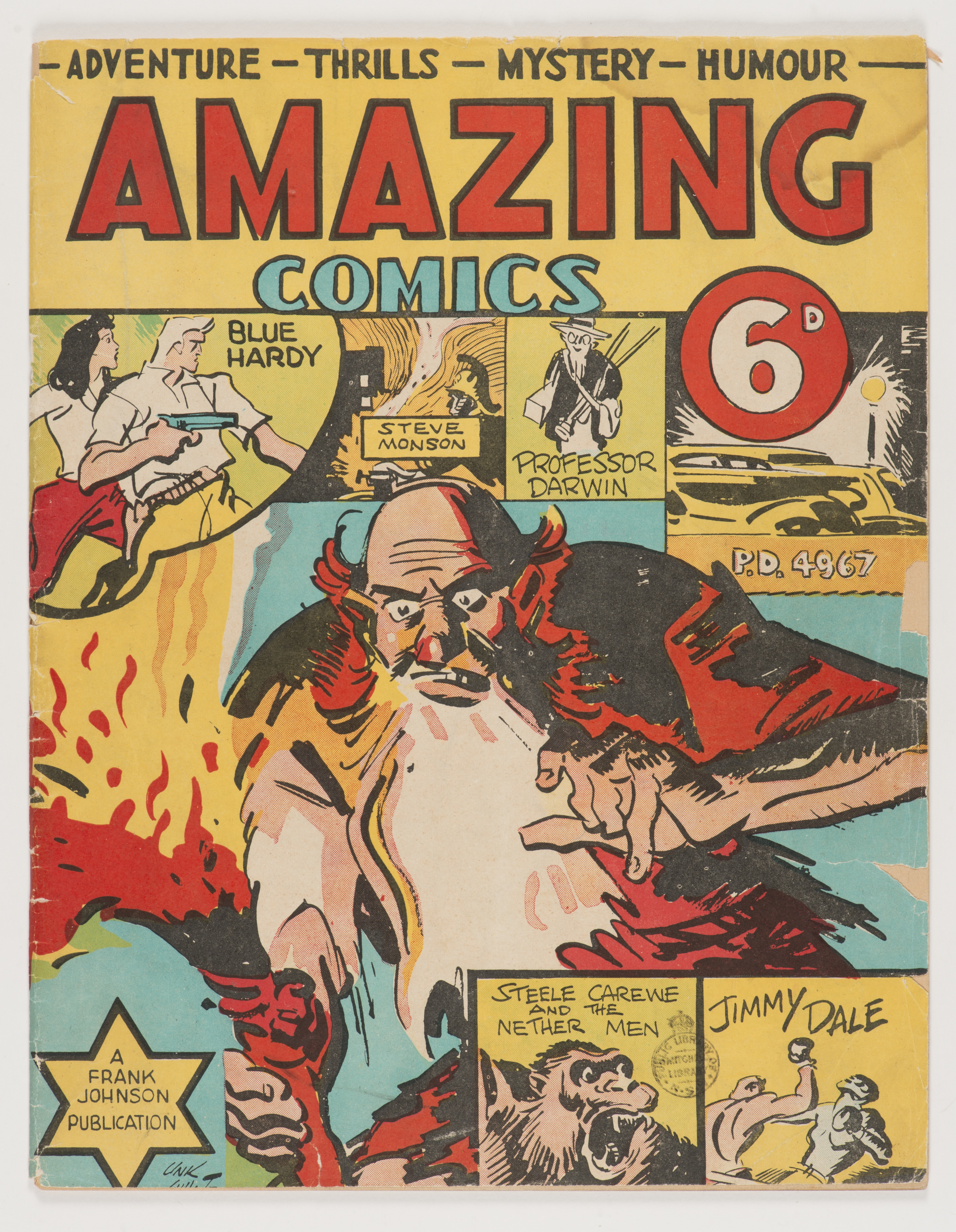
The cover of Amazing Comics, illustrated by Unk White (a Frank Johnson Publication).

In July 1940 the Australian Government facing a US dollar shortage enforced a series of trade regulations and banned the importation of American comic material. This ban created the opportunity for local publishers and artists to enter into the market, creating what has been described as "the richest period in Australian literary history; thousands of titles were produced, millions of copies sold, and dozens of authors found gainful employment". Despite wartime paper restrictions and lack of experienced comic book artists a local industry soon developed, with new publishing companies producing indigenous comic books. The first Frank Johnson Publication comic issued was Amazing, which was released in July 1941. Since wartime regulations prohibited the publication of new periodicals, Frank Johnson Publications published one-shot comics. They continued to release a new comic each week, which in order were Star, Marvel, Magic, Thrilling, Super, Mighty, Master, Victory, Winner, Conquer, Hero, Hot Shot, Crash, Thunder, Terrific, Ace, Bullet, Corker, Startling, Modern and Monster. They continued to change the title week after week and when they had exhausted their supply of titles they re-used the old titles by adding the prefix, 'New' (i.e. New Crash, New Magic etc.).

Essentially Frank Johnson Publications were publishing four different comics a month and releasing one each week, with the stories in Amazing carrying on in Thrilling, Victory and Hot Shot; the stories in Star continuing in Super, Winner, Crash and so on.

Most of the regular artists who worked for Frank Johnson Publications, were freelancers from The Bulletin, Smith's Weekly and other newspapers and included Unk White, Les Dixon, Norm Rice, Dan Russell, Bruce Cousins, Dick Alderton, Carl Lyon, Noel Cook, Frank Jessup, Rhys Williams, Ron Broadley, Phil Belbin, Stan Pitt, Gerard Lants, Moira Bertram, John Jensen, Peter Chapman, Lloyd Piper, Ralph Shelley and Emile Mercier.

Generally the regular artists were paid 30 shillings per page and were guaranteed four to six pages a week. For some this represented a full week's wages, for others, particularly those moonlighting, it meant additional income. Whilst some artists handled their own storylines, the bulk of the early comics were written by Alfred Charles Headley (A. C. Headley or Alf or Chuck). Essentially after an artist had brought in their pages from the previous week they would confer with him, who would type a synopsis of the new story on the spot. The artist would then break down the story and supply or modify the dialogue as they saw fit. A similar approach would be taken by Stan Lee at the Marvel Comics Group thirty years later.

Unk White was responsible for not only drawing the cover of the first comic but also the first adventure strip, 'Blue' Hardy and Diamond Eyed Pygmies.

Locally created comics, including Frank Johnson Publications, disappeared in the 1950s as a result of combined effect of import bans being lifted, a censorship campaign, and the introduction of television.

Frank Johnson's wife Adeleen died in 1941. In 1942 Johnson married Gwen Arton Davies in Sydney.

Frank C. Johnson died in January 1960 in Darlinghurst.

== Titles ==
- Adventure Comics (1946)
- Doctor Evil & the Robotman (1943–44)
- Famous Detective Stories (1946–54)
- Gem Comics (1946–50)
- Magpie Comics (1946)
- New Adventure (1949–50)
- The New Cracker (1945)
- Prendergast of the Silent Service (1944)
- Star Pocket (1942–45)
- True Pirate (1946–49)
- Wizard Comics (1946)
