= Airhawk =

- Based on: Air Hawk and the Flying Doctors by John Dixon
- Written by: Ron McLean
- Directed by: David Baker
- Starring: Eric Oldfield; Louise Howitt
- Music by: Gary Hardman
- Country of origin: Australia
- Original language: English

Production
- Producers: Ron McLean; Colin Eggleston
- Cinematography: Kevan Lind
- Running time: 92 mins
- Production company: Ron McLean Productions

Original release
- Release: 1981

Airhawk, also known as Star of the North, is a 1981 Australian television action film directed by David Baker and starring Eric Oldfield and Louise Howitt. It was based on the cartoon strip Air Hawk and the Flying Doctors by John Dixon.

== Premise ==
Outback pilot Jim Hawk investigates the murder of his brother, who had been involved in diamond mining in Queensland. He uncovers a plan to flood the market with diamonds.

== Cast ==
- Eric Oldfield as Jim Hawk
- Louise Howitt as Janet Grant
- Phillip Ross as Bob Fenton
- Michael Aitkens as The Cowboy
- Elli Maclure as Ellen Boulton
- David Robson as Warren Hawk
- Robbie McGregor as Hans
- Kate Sheil as Wendy
- Margaret Christensen as Mum Foster
- Lois Ramsey as Dorcas
- Myra De Groot as Aunt Ellie
- Allan Oberholzer as Carter
- Malcolm Cork as Wills
- Leo Wockner as Hal Matthews

== Production ==
The film was one of three low budget movies made by Ron McLean Productions, set up by writer Ron McLean in association with Colin Eggleston. It was partly financed by the Queensland Film Corporation.
