= Leonard Frank Meares =

Australian writer

Leonard Frank Meares (13 February 1921 – 4 February 1993) was an Australian writer of western fiction. He wrote over 700 Westerns for the Australian paperback publishers Cleveland and Horwitz using the pseudonym "Marshall McCoy", "Marshall Grover" "Ward Brennan" and "Glenn Murrell".

Among his most famous characters were "Larry & Stretch", Larry Valentine and Stretch Emerson. In the Nordic countries they were known as "Bill & Ben".
