= Horwitz Publications =

Australian publisher

Horwitz Publications Pty Ltd
- Founded: 1920
- Founder: Israel Horwitz; Ruth Horwitz
- Country of origin: Australia
- Headquarters location: Sydney, New South Wales
- Key people: Stanley Horwitz, Susan Horwitz
- Publication types: Novels, Comics, Magazines
- Nonfiction topics: Sports, Education
- Fiction genres: crime, war, thrillers, romance, Western
- Imprints: multiple [see below]
- Official website: horwitz.com.au

Horwitz Publications is an Australian publisher primarily known for its publication of popular and pulp fiction. Established in 1920 in Sydney, Australia by Israel and Ruth Horwitz, the company was a family-owned and -run business until the early 21st century. The company is most associated with their son Stanley Horwitz, who took over publishing operations in 1956. Stanley was eventually succeeded by his son Peter and daughter Susan, who was the company's director in the years 1987-2016.

== History ==
Horwitz started out publishing trade journals and sporting magazines (notably the Sporting Weekly newspaper), and moved into popular, pulp fiction, and comic books in the mid-20th century. It was exceedingly successful in genre fiction: crime, war, thrillers, and romance.

Horwitz ventured into paperbacks in the 1940s, under the imprint Transport Publishing Co, with series of 'Sporting Westerns' and 'Scientific Thrillers' and Australia's first science fiction magazine Thrills Incorporated (1950-2).

Between the 1950s to the 1990s, Horwitz published some of the most popular pulp fiction writers, including A.G. Yates a.k.a. Carter Brown and Marshall Grover, in numerous successful author and title series. Some of the pseudonymous author names were used by multiple writers under contract to Horwitz, which owned the names.

In 1965 Horwitz acquired the Ure Smith publishing firm and in 1972 Paul Hamlyn bought Ure Smith from Horwitz.

In 1973 the Australian Bookseller and Publisher's analysis of output showed that Horwitz headed the list of all Australian publishers by annual output with 192 titles (followed by Angus & Robertson with 180 titles and Rigby. with 153). In 1974 Horwitz was Australian owned, published paperback books and educational titles, and also operated Grahame's bookshops (Grahame Book Co Pty Ltd) and a "major library supply service".

== Comics ==
In the late 1950s, Horwitz published some original Australian comics, notably adaptations of its Carter Brown novels, but also "The Phantom Commando", created by John Dixon but mostly worked on by Maurice Bramley, who drew it until 1956. At its peak, Horwitz reportedly released up to 48 comics and 24 fiction titles each month, with print-runs of up to 250,000 copies. From c. 1950 – c. 1966, Horwitz published a large number of war, Western, and crime comics, predominantly reprints of American comics, sourced mainly from Timely/Atlas/Marvel. From the late 1970s Horwitz published the Australian edition of MAD magazine.

== Mysteries and military and naval thrillers ==
By the 1960s, Horwitz boasted a considerable number of successful authors and had built sufficient momentum to survive the lifting of import restrictions in 1958. As well as Carter Brown's crime thriller, one of Horwitz's most lasting successes was the naval adventure stories of J. E. Macdonnell. Both the Carter Brown and the MacDonnell series continued to be published into the 1980s. "In 1963, Horwitz had eight full-time and almost as many part-time writers punching out 45,000 word novels each month. While generating business for local writers and artists, the firm also acquired overseas material and reprinted them with title and cover changes, often complying with Australian censorship guidelines. James Gant, war correspondent, not only did war pulps, but 'non-fiction' titles such as Columbus (1971 Lancer paperback) and The Besieged (Sphere Books, 1972), a novel of Masada. Ex-naval officer J. E. Macdonnell focused on naval adventures, romance and spy thrillers, while W. R. Bennett wrote many air force adventures."

== Horror and Gothic thrillers ==
Although horror pulps were not as popular as detective and romance, Australian publishers still committed themselves to pushing out 'spine-tingling' titles in that genre. Horwitz also published several horror anthologies. Six were edited by Australian Charles Higham, who mixed horror with witchcraft, vampirism, ghosts and the occult. More often than not the stories he used were out of copyright tales by overseas writers such as Bram Stoker, Edgar Allan Poe, Charles Dickens, Guy de Maupassant, Sheridan Le Fanu and so on. Almost all the Horwitz horror covers were done by Australian artist Benier (Frank Bennier). Higham's anthologies for Horwitz include Tales of Terror (1961); Weird Stories (1961); Nightmare Stories (1962, which includes "The Mummy's Curse" by Horwitz house name James Workman, together with classics, and also unknowns like D.W. Preston)'; The Curse of Dracula and Other Terrifying Tales (1962); Spine-tingling Tales (1965, which prints Le Fanu's "Carmilla" under its movie title "Blood and Roses", and includes the little-known Flora Macdonald Mayor along with classic writers); and Tales of Horror (classic writers along with lesser-knowns such as August Muir, 1962). Spine-tingling Tales had a 2nd printing in 1965, though no evidence has emerged that other titles in the series were reissued.

Horwitz also published Groff Conklin's anthology Twisted, (originally published by Belmont 1962 and reprinted by Horwitz in 1963) and several horror novels under the 'James Dark' and 'James Workman' house names. Examples of the horror novels include "Throne of Satan", "The Witch Hunters" (1963) and Sweet taste of Venom (1963, as by Dark). Collections of horror stories also appeared including Shock Stories (1962, as by Workman); Terrifying Stories (1963, as by Dark); Horror Tales (1963, as by Dark).

In addition to these, Horwitz had a Gothic Library (1966-1977). Most of the titles for this series were written by 'Caroline Farr', a pseudonym of Australian writer Richard Wilkes-Hunter (though the first, The Intruder, was written by Lee Pattinson and other writers were known to have used the Caroline Farr house name, Carl Ruhen amongst them). (In the 1970s, US publishers Signet and New American Library issued many Caroline Farr titles, some reprinted from the Horwitz originals, others original, but still mainly authored by Wilkes-Hunter). Other writers in the Horwitz Gothic Library series apart from 'Farr' included Jane Gordon, Clara Coleman, Wilma Winthrop and Fiona Murray.

== James Workman and James Dark Thrillers ==
The James Workman mystery/thriller books, including sensational thrillers such as Havoc and Impact, and the James Dark books, such as Operation Scuba and Operation Octopus, written by various Australian authors, were directed primarily at the American pulp market, where they were released by New American Library and Signet Books.

== Recent years ==
Horwitz later published educational books and expanded its magazine publishing activities after it wound back its fiction activities in the late 20th century. In 2007 the company's website reported that it remained "a leading quality publisher of Australian consumer magazines". Its magazine division produced material for the adult, sporting, entertainment, audio visual and children’s markets. In 2007 the consumer magazines division of Horwitz Publications was acquired by the private equity group Wolseley Media, which was later known as nextmedia, and which was itself taken over by the Forum Media Group, an international media company headquartered in Munich, Germany.

Horwitz Publications has variously published under the names of Horwitz Publications Inc., Horwitz Publishing Inc. Pty. Ltd., Horwitz International, Inc., Horwitz Group Books Pty. Ltd. and Horwitz Grahame Pty. Ltd. Since 1960 it has been a registered Australian private company with the name Horwitz Publications Pty. Ltd.

== Multi-author series ==
- Sporting Western (1945–1950)
- Scientific Thriller (1948–1952)
- Period Novels (1950)
- Powder Smoke Westerns (1953)
- Western Saga Series (1954)
- Lion Books (1954–1955)
- Gold Star Books (1955–1956)
- Half Million Club (1955–1956)
- King Books (1955–1956)
- Triangle Books (1956)
- GI Books (1956–1957)
- Book of the Month (1958)
- Pocket Books (1959–1974), 1st series
- Name Author Series (1959–1966)
- Sovereign Series (1960)
- Commando/War (1960–1969)
- Four Square Series (1960–1964), British Four Square Books reprints
- Penguin (1961–1962), UK reprints
- Trident Westerns (1964–1966)
- Stag Modern Novels (1964–1965), mostly books originally published by Monarch Books, US
- Quest Books (1965–1969)
- Horwitz Australian Library (1965–1970)
- Mystery Books (1966)
- Caperbacks Series (1966–1968)
- Gothic Library (1966–1967)
- New American Library Series (1967–1968), US reprints
- Personality Series (1967–1968)
- Libido Series (1969)
- Adults Only (1969–1974), published under the Scripts imprint
- Adventure Classic (1970)
- Satyr Series (1970)
- Sea Adventure Library (1970)
- Pocket Books (1974–1981), 2nd series
- Stag Books (1976–1981)

This information appears in Graeme Flanagan's bibliography.

== Single-author series ==
- Carter Brown (1951–1984)
- Marc Brody (1955–1960)
- Dean Ballard Western (1956)
- K. T. McCall (1957–1965)
- John Laffin (1957–1958)
- James Gant (1957–1958)
- J. E. Macdonnell (1957–1989)
- Tod Conrad (1957–1965)
- Roger Hunt (1958–1963)
- Michael Own (1958–1967)
- Kid Colt Outlaw (1959)
- Wyatt Earp (1959)
- Johnny O'Hara (1959–1962)
- Gerry North (1959)
- Shane Douglas (1959–1975)
- John Wynnum (1959–1967)
- W. H. Williams (1959–1960)
- Ivan Southall (1959–1960)
- Willie Fennell (1959–1962)
- Alastair Mars (1959–1960)
- Alex Crane (1959), Alex Crane Suspense Stories
- W. R. Bennett (1960–1969)
- Kerry Mitchell (1960–1964)
- Richard Wilkes-Hunter (1960–1967)
- Ray Slattery (1961–1969)
- James Holledge (1961–1970)
- Karen Miller (1961–1963)
- James Dark (1962–1966)
- James Workman (1962–1968)
- John Slater (1962–1973)
- Rebecca Dee (1962–1963)
- Noni Arden (1963–1967)
- John Duffy (1963–1965)
- R. Charlott (1965), Army War series
- Jim Kent (1966–1976)
- Carl Ruhen (1966–1973)
- Marshall Grover (1967–1993)
- Teri Lester (1967–1968)
- Terry West (1969–1970)
- Ricki Francis (1970–1977)
- Stuart Hall (1970–1980)
- Adrian Gray (1971–1975)
- R.G. Hall (1971–1973)
- Alison Hart (1976–1977)

This list appears in Graeme Flanagan's bibliography.
