= Carter Brown =

Writer of detective fiction (1923–1985)

Alan Geoffrey Yates
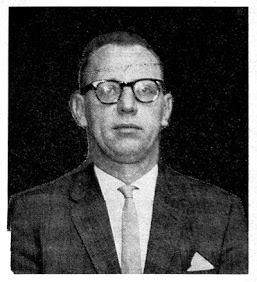
- Alan Geoffrey Yates visiting Finland in 1964.
- Born: 1 August 1923; Ilford England
- Died: 5 May 1985 (aged 61); Cremorne, Sydney, Australia
- Occupation: Novelist

The Blonde by Carter Brown Cover art by Robert E. McGinnis.

Carter Brown was the literary pseudonym of Alan Geoffrey Yates (1 August 1923 – 5 May 1985), an English-born Australian writer of detective fiction. Between 1954 and 1984 Yates published 215 ‘Carter Brown’ novels and some 75 novella-length stories.

== Early life ==
He was born on 1 August 1923 at Ilford, Essex, England, the only child of Harry Thomas Yates a railway clerk, and his wife Linda Annie, née Willingale. Alan worked for British Acoustic Films where he converted films from 35mm to 16mm.

Enlisting in the Royal Navy in September 1942, he served aboard Landing Craft Support (Large) 504 on operations that included the Normandy landings on June 6, 1944. After he was commissioned in February 1945, he spent eighteen months in the light cruiser, HMS Euryalus, in the East Indies Fleet and British Pacific Fleet where he first visited Australia. He was demobilised as a sub-lieutenant in England in January 1947.

On leave in Sydney in 1945 he had met 18-year-old Denise Sinclair MacKellar. They married on 3 June 1946 at St Chad’s Church of England, Cremorne, New South Wales. In England he went back to British Acoustic Films as a sound cameraman, a job he found unrewarding. He wrote some magazine articles and radio scripts that were rejected. The couple returned to Australia in 1948.

After working as a salesman, wine company clerk and newsagent supplier, Yates joined Qantas as a publicity writer where he produced their monthly flight magazine as well as the staff journal.

== Career ==
In his spare time he wrote a western, which was accepted by Invincible Press, where he was paid £20, or £1 per 1000 words. Soon he was also writing for Horwitz Publications where he authored horror, science-fiction and detective stories, published under the pen names of ‘Paul Valdez’ and ‘Tod Conway’. His publisher encouraged him to specialise on crime genre novellas and then full-length detective novels, the first of which was Murder is My Mistress (1954). These were published under the pseudonyms of ‘Peter Carter Brown’ and ‘Peter Carter-Brown’.

Horwitz lured him to become a full-time writer, offering him a contract that guaranteed a weekly income of £30 against royalties. In the mid-1950s Yates was turning out more than twenty books a year; they were also published in England and Finland. In 1958 the New American Library began to publish his novels (beginning with The Body) under the Signet label and with the author listed as Carter Brown, a name judged most suitable for the American market. Eventually his books were translated into fourteen languages, including German and Japanese.

Yates soon became a literary phenomenon. He wrote westerns under the pseudonym Todd Conway, and science fiction under Paul Valdez. He even found the time to write books under various versions of his own name as well as other pseudonyms, Dennis Sinclair and Sinclair MacKellar. But it was his pseudonym Peter Carter Brown then later, Carter Brown ('Peter' was dropped for the US market) who was to become the international best-selling pulp fiction author.

The early success of Carter Brown in the 1950s meant that Yates was contracted to produce one short novel and two long novels each month. In reality, Yates was prolific with 322 published Carter Brown novels, including multiple series variously featuring protagonists Mike Farrell, Andy Kane, Mavis Seidlitz, Lt. Al Wheeler, Rick Holman, Danny Boyd, Larry Baker, Zelda Roxanne, et al. Yet despite the enormity of his output, a 1963 profile in Pix magazine revealed he approached deadlines 'with the reluctance of a long-distance swimmer shivering on the brink of a cold, grey English Channel. In the manic depressive moments of the third night without sleep – when the deadline is long past and the mental block has set solid as concrete, the writer inevitably descends into self-analysis. He knows, of course, that it will be no more help than the last Dexedrine tablet but still clings to the hope that, somehow, sometime, he will find a way of avoiding the recurrence of his present situation.’

His books, originally published by Horwitz and Signet, were set in the United States and published throughout the anglophone world. In its obituary for Yates in 1985, The New York Times noted that he had written "some 30 detective novels with American backgrounds before ever having visited the United States ... He said he chose American settings because Australians preferred them."

A rumour spread at the height of his popularity that Yates was one of John F. Kennedy's favourite authors – a rumour which helped propel his sales even further in the North American market.

The novels were also popular in Europe where they were translated into French, Danish, Norwegian, Swedish, Russian, Finnish, German, Portuguese, Romanian, Dutch. In Asia, some of the novels were translated into Thai and Japanese.

Carter Brown's huge international success saw reportedly 120 million books in print, second only to The Bible in terms of the number of languages into which they were translated. The success of the books also spawned a comic book series, the 'Carter Brown Murder Mystery Hour' on radio, three French films, a Japanese TV series, and a French literary award for 'The most whiskies drunk in a single novel'.

In the early 1980s, Yates and Richard O'Brien of The Rocky Horror Show fame wrote a musical of The Stripper, described in classic Carter Brown terminology as 'the girl who says it all from the neck down'.

Yates died of a heart attack in 1985 in Sydney. In 1997, he was posthumously awarded a Ned Kelly, Australia's leading literary award for crime writing, for his lifelong contribution to the art.

== C. J. McKenzie ==
C. J. McKenzie, an editor for Horwitz, was commissioned to write ten of the Carter Brown novels while Yates was overseas in 1958. McKenzie also wrote crime books as Mike Boon and war novels as Michael Owen.

== Awards ==
- 1997 – Ned Kelly Award for Lifelong Contribution

== Series characters ==
=== Lt. Al Wheeler series ===
Homicide investigator in fictional Pine County, LA

1. The Wench Is Wicked (1956).
2. Blonde Verdict (1956). (US title The Brazen). When a lawyer drops dead at Al Wheeler's feet, poisoned with curare, nobody who knew the guy cares, so everyone is a suspect.
3. Delilah Was Deadly (1956).
4. No Harp For My Angel (1956).
5. Booty For A Babe (1956).
6. Eve, It's Extortion (1956). (US title "The Victim")
7. No Law Against Angels (1957). (US title "The Body")
8. Chorine Makes a Killing (1957).
9. Doll for the Big House (1957).
10. The Blonde (1958).
11. The Corpse (1958).
12. The Lover (1959).
13. The Mistress (1959).
14. The Dame (1959).
15. Passionate (1959).
16. Wanton (1959).
17. The Bombshell (1960). A previous shorter version was Doll for the Big House.
18. Desired (1960).
19. Lament for a Lousy Lover (1960). With Mavis Seidlitz.
20. Temptress (1960).
21. Exotic (1961).
22. Stripper (1961).
23. Tigress (1961).
24. Unorthodox Corpse (1961).
25. The Hellcat (1962). Trying to identify a pickled head in a jar lands Al Wheeler between an entitled family and a pair of gangsters, one dubbed "The Creeping Terror".
26. The Dumdum Murder (1962).
27. Angel! (1962).
28. Lady is Transparent (1962).
29. Girl in a Shroud (1963).
30. The Lady is Available (1963).
31. The Girl Who was Possessed (1963).
32. Dance of Death (1964).
33. Velvet Vixen (1964).
34. A Corpse for Christmas (1965).
35. Until Temptation Do Us Part (1967).
36. Plush-Lined Coffin (1967).
37. Deep Cold Green (1968).
38. The Up-Tight Blonde (1969).
39. Aseptic Murders (1972).
40. Born Loser (1973).
41. Burden of Guilt (1970).
42. Creative Murders (1971).
43. W.H.O.R.E.! (1971).
44. Clown (1972).
45. Night Wheeler (1974).
46. Wheeler Fortune (1974).
47. Wheeler, Dealer! (1975).
48. Hammer of Thor (1975).
49. Busted Wheeler (1979).
50. Death on the Downbeat (1980).
51. Model for Murder (1980).
52. Wicked Widow (1981)

=== Rick Holman series ===
"Troubleshooter for the Stars" based in Hollywood

1. Swingers (1961).
2. Zelda (1961).
3. Murderer Among Us (1962).
4. Jade-Eyed Jungle (1963).
5. White Bikini (1963).
6. Wind-Up Doll (1964).
7. The Never-Was Girl (1964).
8. Murder is a Package Deal (1964).
9. Who Killed Doctor Sex? (1964).
10. Girl From Outer Space (1965).
11. Nude With a View (1965).
12. Blonde on a Broomstick (1966).
13. No Tears from the Widow (1966).
14. Play Now ... Kill Later (1966).
15. Deadly Kitten (1967).
16. Long Time No Leona (1967).
17. Die Anytime, After Tuesday! (1969).
18. Flagellator (1969).
19. Streaked-Blonde Slave (1969).
20. The Hang-Up Kid (1970).
21. Good Year for Dwarfs? (1970).
22. Where Did Charity Go? (1970).
23. The Coven (1971).
24. Invisible Flamini (1971).
25. The Pornbroker (1972).
25. The Master (1973).
26. Phreak-Out (1973).
27. Negative in Blue (1974).
28. Star-Crossed Lover (1974).
29. Ride the Roller Coaster (1975).
30. Remember Maybelle? (1976).
31. See it Again, Sam (1979).
32. Phantom Lady (1980).
33. Wicked Widow (1981).
34. Blonde on the Rocks (1996).

=== Danny Boyd series ===
Private eye in New York

1. Tempt a Tigress (1958).
2. Suddenly by Violence (1959).
3. Terror Comes Creeping (1959).
4. Walk Softly, Witch (1959).
5. The Dream is Deadly (1960).
6. Graves, I Dig! (1960).
7. Wayward Wahine (1960).
8. Ever-Loving Blues (1961).
9. Sad-Eyed Seductress (1961).
10. The Savage Salome (1961).
11. Angel! (1962). With Al Wheeler.
12. The Ice-Cold Nude (1962).
13. Lover Don't Come Back (1962).
14. Nymph to the Slaughter (1963).
15. The Passionate Pagan (1963).
16. Silken Nightmare (1963).
17. Catch Me a Phoenix! (1965).
18. Sometime Wife (1965).
19. The Black Lace Hangover (1966).
20. House of Sorcery (1967).
21. The Mini-Murders (1968).
22. Murder is the Message (1969).
23. Only the Very Rich (1969).
24. The Coffin Bird (1970).
25. Sex Clinic (1971).
26. Manhattan Cowboy (1973).
27. So Move the Body (1973).
28. Early Boyd (1975).
29. Pipes are Calling (1976).
30. Savage Sisters (1976).
31. Strawberry-Blond Jungle (1979).
32. Rip-Off (1979)
33. Kiss Michelle Goodbye (1981).

=== Mavis Seidlitz series ===
Tough female private eye

1. A Bullet for my Baby (1955).
2. Honey, Here's Your Hearse! (1955).
3. Good-Morning Mavis (1957).
4. Loving and the Dead (1959).
5. None But the Lethal Heart (1959).
6. Lament for a Lousy Lover (1960). With Al Wheeler.
7. Tomorrow is Murder (1960).
8. Murder Wears a Mantilla (1962).
9. Bump and Grind Murders (1964).
10. Seidlitz and the Super Spy (1967).
11. Murder is so Nostalgk! (1972).
12. And the Undead Sing (1974).

=== Larry Baker series ===
1. Charlie Sent Me! (November 1963) [rewritten from Swan Song for a Siren, 1955]
2. No Blonde Is an Island (1965)
3. So What Killed the Vampire? (1966)
4. Had I But Groaned (1968)
5. True Son of the Beast! (1970)
6. The Iron Maiden (1975)

=== Randy Roberts series ===
1. Murder in the Family Way (August 1971)
2. The Seven Sirens (1972)
3. The Angry Amazons (1972) w/Danny Boyd
4. Murder on High (1973)
5. Sex Trap (1975)

=== Paul Donavan series ===
1 Donavan (February 1974)
2 Donavan's Day (1975)
3 Chinese Donavan (1976)
4 Donavan's Delight (1979)

=== Andy Kane series ===
1. The Lady's Alive! (August 1953)
2. The Hong Kong Caper (1962) [rewritten from "Blonde, Bad, and Beautiful", 1957]
3. Bird in a Guilt-Edged Cage (1963), (US and UK title The Guilt-Edged Cage (1962) [rewritten from "That's Piracy, My Pet", 1957]

=== Mike Farrell series ===
1. The Lady Is Chased (September 1954) Mike Farrell
2. The Million Dollar Babe (February 1961) [rewritten from "Cutie Cashed His Chips", 1955]
3. The Scarlet Flush (1963) [rewritten from "Ten Grand Tallulah and Temptation", 1957]

=== Mark Jordan series ===
1. Model for Murder (October 1953)
2. My Mermaid Murmurs Murder (1954)

=== Joe Kahn series ===
1. Honky-Tonk Homicide (January 1954)
2. Perfumed Poison (July 1954)

=== Ivor MacCullum series ===
1 Sweetheart You Slay Me (September 1952)
2 Blackmail Beauty (1953)

=== Max Dumas series ===
1. Deadly Miss (July 1958)
2. Goddess Gone Bad (September 1958)

=== Greg Ballard series ===
Secret agent of a private organisation known as SURVIVAL. Written as Dennis Sinclair

1. The Temple Dogs Guard My Fate (1969)
2. The Third Force (1976)
3. Blood Brothers (1976)
4. The Friends Of Lucifer (1977)

=== Carter Stanton series ===
Publisher of "The Sultan" and owner of "The Harem" key club.

- Murder in the Key Club (1962).

== Selected bibliography ==
=== Novels ===
Novelette Series

- The Lady Is Murder (Transport Publishing Co, 1951) By Peter Carter Brown
- Ssssh! She's a Killer (Transport Publishing Co, 1951) By Peter Carter Brown

Novel Series

- Venus Unarmed (Transport Publishing Co, 1954)
- The Lady Is Chased (Transport Publishing Co, 1954)
- Maid for Murder (Transport Publishing Co, 1955)
- Shamus, Your Slip Is Showing (Horwitz Publications Inc, 1955)
- The Two Timing Blonde (Horwitz Publications Inc, 1955)
- Curves for a Coroner (Horwitz Publications Inc, August 1955)

Numbered Series

1. A Bullet for My Baby (Horwitz Publications Inc, September 1955) Mavis Seidlitz
2. Swan Song for a Siren (Horwitz Publications Inc, September 1955) Joe Dunne Note: Revised in 1963 to Charlie Sent Me with character Larry Baker
3. Cutie Cashed His Chips (Horwitz Publications Inc, October 1955) Mike Farrel Note: Revised as The Million Dollar Babe in 1961.
4. Miss Called Murder (Horwitz Publications Inc, October 1955)
5. The Wench Is Wicked (Horwitz Publications Inc, November 1955)
6. Kiss and Kill (Horwitz Publications Inc, 1955)
7. Shroud for My Sugar (Horwitz Publications Inc, 1955)
8. Murder Is My Mistress (Horwitz Publications Inc, 1955)
9. Kiss Me Deadly (Horwitz Publications Inc, 1955)
10. Lead Astray (Horwitz Publications Inc, December 1955)
11. Death of a Doll (Horwitz Publications Inc, January 1956)
12. Murder By Miss-Demeanour (Horwitz Publications Inc, 1956)
13. Blonde Verdict (Horwitz Publications Inc, May 1956) Al Wheeler: Revised in 1960 to "The Brazen"
14. The Hoodlum Was a Honey (Horwitz Publications Inc, 1956) as Penthouse Passout (1953)
15. My Darling Is Deadpan (Horwitz Publications Inc, 1956)

Reprint By Demand Series

1. The Hoodlum Was a Honey (Horwitz Publications Inc, November 1958)
2. Lead Astray (Horwitz Publications Inc, December 1958)
3. My Darling Is Deadpan (Horwitz Publications Inc, January 1959)
4. Hi-Jack For Jill (Horwitz Publications Inc, February 1959)
5. Blonde, Beautiful, and – Blam! (Horwitz Publications Inc, March 1959)
6. No Halo For Hedy (Horwitz Publications Inc, 1959)

First Collectors' Series

- Dead Dolls Don't Cry : Widow Is Willing; Blackmail for a Brunette (Horwitz Publications)
- The Scarlet Flush (Horwitz, 1963)
- The Brazen, and The Stripper (Horwitz, 1981)
- Chill on Chili, Butterfly Nett, and Honky Tonk Homicide (Horwitz)

Second Collectors' Series

Double Editions

- Zelda, and The Wind-up Doll (Horwitz Grahame, 1982, c1961)

International Edition Series

1. The Body (Horwitz Publications Inc, January 1961) Revised from No Law Against Angels

=== Autobiography ===
- Ready when you are, C.B.! : the autobiography of Alan Yates alias Carter Brown (Macmillan, 1983)

=== Criticism ===
- Toni Johnson-Woods, 'The Promiscuous Carter Brown', in JASAL Special Issue, The Colonial Present, 2008, pp. 163–183. Available online
