= J. E. Macdonnell =

Australian writer

- Born: James Edmond Macdonnell; 3 November 1917; Mackay, Queensland, Australia
- Died: 13 September 2002 (aged 84); Buderim, Queensland, Australia
- Spouse: Valerie (1956–2002)
- Children: 3
- Writing career
- Pen name: James Edmond Macdonnell, James Macdonnell, J.E.M., Jim Macdonnell, J. Macdonnell, Macnell, James Macnell, James Dark, Kerry Mitchell, Michael Owen.
- Period: 1942–1989
- Genre: Fiction

James Edmond Macdonnell (3 November 1917 – 13 September 2002) was an Australian novelist. The covers of his novels declare him "Australia's leading novelist of the Navy" and "Australia's greatest novelist of the sea".

== Biography ==
James Edmond Macdonnell was born in 1917 in Mackay, Queensland and became one of Australia's most prolific writers of paperback novels. As a boy, he became determined to go to sea and read every seafaring book he could find. At age 13, while his family was still asleep, he took his brother's bike and rode some 80 miles from his home town to Brisbane in an attempt to see ships and the sea. Fortunately, he was found and returned to his family. He attended the Toowoomba Grammar School from 1931 to 1932. He served in the Royal Australian Navy for fourteen years, joining at age 17, advancing through all lower deck ranks and reaching the rank of commissioned gunnery officer. He began writing books while still in active service. The publicity biography on the back cover of Command! (1959) states that "he began with novels in 1942".

Macdonnell wrote stories for The Bulletin under the pseudonym "Macnell" and from 1948 to 1956 he was a member of The Bulletin staff. His first book, Fleet Destroyer – a collection of stories about life on the small ships – was published by The Book Depot, Melbourne, in 1945. Macdonnell began writing full-time for Horwitz in 1956, writing an average of a dozen books a year.

After leaving the navy, Macdonnell lived in St. Ives, Sydney and pursued his writing career. In 1988, he retired to Buderim on the Sunshine Coast in Queensland. He died peacefully in his sleep at a Buderim hospital in 2002. He is survived by his wife Valerie and his children Beth, Jane and Peter.

The radio play Wings Off the Sea was based on one of his stories.

== The Bulletin ==
Macdonnell's work for The Bulletin, using the pseudonym Macnell, includes the following:

Articles for The Bulletin
Title	Edition	Date	Page(s)
Neptune's Feet of Clay	Vol.70 no.3640	16 November 1949	22–23
A Shepherd at Sea	Vol.70 no.3646	28 December 1949	4, 20
Standby to Ram!	Vol.71 no.3696	13 December 1950	34–35, 42
The Insubordination of P.O. Brady (from Gimme the Boats)	Vol.71 no.3661	12 April 1950	4, 20–21
'Old Guns' : His Strange Disease	Vol.71 no.3669	7 June 1950	20, 22
A Lesson for Two (from Gimme the Boats)	Vol.71 no.3683	13 September 1950	21–22
International Incident	Vol.72 no.3715	25 April 1951	20, 22, 24, 32
The Chook Gets Hers	Vol.72 no.3747	5 December 1951	27, 39
Borrowed Braid	Vol.72 no.3748	12 December 1951	32–33, 36
Target Unidentified	Vol.73 no.3762	19 March 1952	16–17
The Drum	Vol.73 no.3764	2 April 1952	4, 14–15
Destroyer Operation (from Gimme the Boats)	Vol.73 no.3773	4 June 1952	4, 14–15
Submarining Off Sydney	Vol.73 no.3790	1 October 1952	4
Pity Requited 1952	Vol.73 no.3797	19 November 1952	20, 22
Untitled	Vol.74 no.3812	4 March 1953	
Open Sights	Vol.74 no.3817	8 April 1953	20
What You Learn in the Navy	Vol.82 no.4232	22 March 1961	16

== Publishers ==
- The Book Depot
- Ace Books
- Constable & Co. Ltd.
- Continental Printing Co. Ltd. (Hong Kong)
- Corgi Books
- Dent (London)
- Flammarion (France)
- Horwitz Publications
- Signet Books
- The Children's Press

== Works ==
J. E. Macdonnell wrote over 200 novels, in at least 7 different series under several versions of his own name and several pseudonyms:

- J. E. Macdonnell
- James Edmond Macdonnell
- James Macdonnell
- J.E.M.
- Jim Macdonnell
- J. Macdonnell
- James Macnell
- James Dark
- Kerry Mitchell
- Michael Owen.

James Dark was a Horwitz house pseudonym shared by several authors. Some believe that he may have written as James Workman, another Horwitz house pseudonym, as well. Macdonnell's work has been published in at least nine different languages.

=== Characters ===
Macdonnell's naval stories feature several recurring characters:

- Captain "Dutchy" Holland, D.S.O.
- Captain Peter Bentley, V.C.
- Captain Bruce Sainsbury, V.C.
- Jim Brady.
- XO Lieutenant Commander Robert Randall

Several books follow Jim Brady through the ranks from Able Seaman to Captain.

Recurring characters in other series include Commander Carton, a "tough, enterprising skipper" in the Crime Series, Mark Hood, an international spy, in the International Espionage series and Captain Mettle, V.C. in the three juvenile novels.

=== Series ===
Since J. E. Macdonnell wrote so many books, many of which were released numerous times in different guises, in different collections and in various countries, it is difficult to identify every published series but some can be clearly identified:

- J. E. Macdonnell Series.
- The Horwitz Australian Library.
- The Horwitz Sea Adventure Library or Horwitz Naval Series.
- The Classics Series.
- The Collector's Series.
- The Juvenile Books.
- The Medical Series.
- The Commander Carton Crime Series by Horwitz.
- The International Espionage Series.

The Collector's Series, and the Classics Series both comprise 141 books, with 2 differences between them other than the title sequence. The Collector's Series does not contain the book The Captain and the classic series does not contain the book Don't Gimme The Ships. Both of these series comprise books from the original Sea Adventure Series.

==== The Juvenile Books ====
Macdonnell wrote three juvenile works about the character Captain Mettle using the pseudonym James Macnell. They were published by Constable and The Children's Press. He wrote another entitled Colt and Co in the Valley of Gold as J. Macdonnell, which was published by Dent in 1960. This book was described in the wrapper notes as "the first of a new series" but no further titles were forthcoming.

Mettle at Woomera was re-released in paperback as Weapon Raid by Horwitz in 1979, using the name J. E. Macdonnell.

The Juvenile Books
Title	Year
Captain Mettle, V.C.	1955
Mettle Dives Deep	1956
Mettle at Woomera	1957
Colt and Co in the Valley of Gold	1960
Weapon Raid	1979

==== The Commander Carton Crime Series ====
Commander Carton is a retired R.N. captain who finds himself fighting crime.

The Crime Series
Title	Year
Commander Carton	1960
Alias Carton	1961

==== The Horwitz Naval Series ====
Published as J. E. Macdonnell.

The Horwitz Naval Series
No.	Title	Year	No.	Title	Year	No.	Title	Year	No.	Title	Year
1	Standby to Ram	1957	38	Broadsides!	1962	75	Hell Ship	1966	112	Circle of Fire	1970
2	Target Unidentified	1957	39	Battle Line	1962	76	The Convert	1966	113	For Valour	1971
3	Battle Ensign	1958	40	The Long Haul	1962	77	Wall of Fire	1966	114	Torrent of Fire	1971
4	Enemy in Sight	1959	41	Away Boarders	1962	78	The Unforgiving Sea	1967	115	Guns for God	1971
5	Command	1959	42	The First Lieutenant	1962	79	Down the Throat	1967	116	Damn the Torpedoes	1971
6	Alarm–EBoats!	1958	43	UBoat	1962	80	Combat Assignment	1967	117	First Command	1971
7	The Weak Link	1959	44	Flotilla Leader	1962	81	The Snake Boats	1967	118	Standing into Danger	1971
8	Presumed Sunk	1958	45	Sea Surgeon	1962	82	The Misfit	1967	119	Torpedo Junction	1971
9	Mutiny	1958	46	Abandon Ship!	1963	83	Behemoth	1967	120	The Worst Enemy	1971
10	Coffin Island	1958	47	Conflict	1963	84	Dit Spinner	1967	121	North West by North	1971
11	Frogman!	1958	48	Repel Boarders	1963	85	The Power and the Privilege	1968	122	Chain of Violence	1972
12	Killer Ship	1958	49	Not Under Command	1963	86	Rat Island	1968	123	Close Up	1972
13	Night Encounter	1958	50	Fire One!	1963	87	Petty Officer Brady	1968	124	False Colours	1972
14	Bilgewater	1958	51	Abandon and Destroy	1963	88	Valiant Mission	1968	125	The Brave Men	1972
15	The Secret Weapon	1959	52	The Buffer	1963	89	Full Fathom Five	1968	126	Point Blank	1972
16	Target Battleship	1959	53	Decision	1963	90	Approved to Scrap	1968	127	Most Immediate	1972
17	Dive! Dive! Dive!	1959	54	The Gun	1963	91	Attack and be Damned	1968	128	This Ship is Mine	1972
18	The Surgeon	1959	55	The Pawn	1964	92	Mission Hopeless	1968	129	The Trap	1972
19	The Gunner	1959	56	Sabotage	1964	93	Judas Rat	1968	130	The Verge of Hell	1972
20	The Captain	1960	57	The Betrayal	1964	94	High Command	1968	131	Blind into Doom	1972
21	Brood of the Eagle	1960	58	Collision Course	1964	95	HunterKiller	1968	132	Fire Storm	1973
22	The Recommend	1960	59	The Big Wind	1964	96	White Fury	1968	133	The Iron Claw	1973
23	The Coxswain	1960	60	Killer Group	1964	97	The Hammer of God	1968	134	Attack!	1973
24	The Challenge	1960	61	The Mistake	1964	98	Headlong into Hell	1968	135	A Council of Captains	1974
25	Convoy	1960	62	Course to Intercept	1964	99	Decoyed	1968	136	The Kill	1974
26	Find And Destroy	1960	63	Creeping Attack	1964	100	To the Death	1969	137	Court Martial	1975
27	Escort Ship	1960	64	The Jaws of Hell	1965	101	Execute!	1969	138	Operational Immediate	1975
28	Don't Gimme the Ships	1960	65	Close and Investigate	1965	102	Strike Force	1969	139	The Dark of the Night	1975
29	The Blind Eye	1961	66	Under Sealed Orders	1965	103	The Big Hunt	1969	140	Liberty Men	1976
30	Eagles Over Taranto	1961	67	Flashpoint	1965	104	Operation Jackal	1969	141	The Battle for Midway	1976
31	Fleet Destroyer	1961	68	White Death	1965	105	And the Heavens Spoke	1969	142	Big Bill the Bastard	1976
32	The Rocky	1961	69	The Deserter	1965	106	Not Wanted on Voyage	1970	143	Confirmed in Command	1976
33	The Lesson	1961	70	The Duel	1965	107	The Last Stand	1970	144	Standoff	1977
34	Clear for Action	1961	71	Whispering Death	1965	108	Object Destruction	1970	145	The Shadow	1977
35	Battle Fire	1961	72	Point of Departure	1966	109	Battle Hymn	1970	146	Death of a Destroyer	1977
36	The Ordeal	1961	73	Loom of Ice	1966	110	Died Fighting	1970	147	Valiant Occasions	1960
37	Sainsbury V.C.	1962	74	Foul Ground	1966	111	Fog Blind	1970			

==== The Classics Series ====
The classics series is a re-release of most titles from the Horwitz Naval Series. The covers were mainly coloured silver and as a result this series is also known as the silver series.

The Classics Series
No.	Title	No.	Title	No.	Title	No.	Title
1	Stand By To Ram	37	U-Boat	73	Wall of Fire	109	For Valour
2	Target Unidentified	38	Battle Fire	74	The Unforgiving Sea	110	Torrent of Fire
3	Battle Ensign	39	The Ordeal	75	Down The Throat	111	Guns For God
4	Enemy in Sight	40	Sainsbury, V.C.	76	Combat Assignment	112	Damn The Torpedoes!
5	Command	41	Broadsides!	77	The Misfit	113	Torpedo Junction
6	Alarm-E-Boats!	42	Flotilla Leader	78	The Snake Boats	114	First Command
7	The Weak Link	43	Abandon Ship	79	Attack And Be Damned	115	Standing into Danger
8	Presumed Sunk	44	Conflict	80	Behemoth	116	The Worst Enemy
9	Mutiny	45	Repel Boarders	81	Dit Spinner	117	Northwest By North
10	Coffin Island	46	Not Under Command	82	Approved To Scrap	118	Chain of Violence
11	Frogman	47	Fire One!	83	The Power & The Privilege	119	Close Up
12	Killer Ship	48	The Buffer	84	Rat Island	120	False Colours
13	Night Encounter	49	Decision	85	Petty Officer Brady	121	The Brave Men
14	The Secret Weapon	50	Abandon And Destroy	86	Valiant Mission	122	Point Blank
15	Target Battleship	51	The Pawn	87	Full Fathom Five	123	Most Immediate
16	Dive! Dive! Dive!	52	The Gun	88	Mission Hopeless	124	This Ship Is Mine
17	The Surgeon	53	Sabotage!	89	Judas Rat	125	The Trap
18	The Gunner	54	Collision Course	90	High Command	126	The Verge of Hell
19	The Captain	55	The Big Wind	91	Hunter-Killer	127	Blind into Doom
20	Brood of the Eagle	56	Killer Group	92	White Fury	128	Fire Storm
21	The Recommend	57	The Mistake	93	The Hammer of God	129	The Iron Claw
22	The Coxswain	58	Course To Intercept	94	Headlong into Hell	130	Attack!
23	The Challenge	59	Creeping Attack	95	Decoyed	131	A Council of Captains
24	Convoy	60	The Jaws of Hell	96	To The Death	132	The Kill
25	Find And Destroy	61	Close And Investigate	97	Execute!	133	Court Martial
26	The Blind Eye	62	Flashpoint	98	Strike Force	134	Big Bill The Bastard
27	Eagles Over Taranto	63	White Death	99	The Big Hunt	135	Confirmed in Command
28	Escort Ship	64	The Deserter	100	Operation Jackal	136	Operational Immediate
29	Fleet Destroyer	65	The Duel	101	And The Heavens Spoke	137	The Dark of the Night
30	The Rocky	66	Whispering Death	102	Not Wanted on Voyage	138	Liberty Men
31	The Lesson	67	Point of Departure	103	The Last Stand	139	The Shadow
32	Clear For Action	68	Loom of Ice	104	Object: Destruction	140	Standoff
33	Battle Line	69	Foul Ground	105	Battle Hymn	141	Death of a Destroyer
34	The Long Haul	70	Under Sealed Orders	106	Fog Blind		
35	Away Boarders!	71	Hell Ship	107	Died Fighting		
36	The First Lieutenant	72	The Convert	108	Circle of Fire		

==== The Collector's Series ====
The collector's series is another re-release of most titles from the Horwitz Naval Series. The covers were mainly coloured gold and as a result this series is also known as the gold series.

The Collector's Series
No.	Title	No.	Title	No.	Title	No.	Title
1	Stand By To Ram	37	Battle Fire	73	Under Sealed Orders	109	Guns For God
2	Target Unidentified	38	The Ordeal	74	Hell Ship	110	Damn The Torpedoes
3	Battle Ensign	39	Sainsbury, V.C.	75	The Convert	111	Torpedo Junction
4	Enemy in Sight	40	Flotilla Leader	76	Petty Officer Brady	112	First Command!
5	Command	41	Abandon Ship	77	Valiant Mission	113	Standing into Danger
6	Alarm-E-Boats!	42	Conflict	78	Down The Throat	114	The Worst Enemy
7	The Weak Link	43	Repel Boarders	79	Mission Hopeless	115	Northwest By North
8	Presumed Sunk	44	Not Under Command	80	Combat Assignment	116	Chain of Violence
9	Mutiny	45	Fire One!	81	Judas Rat	117	Close Up
10	Target Battleship	46	The Buffer	82	High Command	118	False Colours
11	Dive! Dive! Dive!	47	Decision	83	Approved To Scrap	119	The Brave Men
12	Coffin Island	48	Abandon And Destroy	84	Attack And Be Damned	120	Point Blank
13	Frogman	49	The Pawn	85	The Snake Boats	121	Most Immediate
14	Killer Ship	50	The Gun	86	Hunter-Killer	122	This Ship Is Mine
15	Night Encounter	51	Sabotage!	87	White Fury	123	The Trap
16	The Secret Weapon	52	Collision Course	88	Dit Spinner	124	The Verge of Hell
17	Brood of the Eagle	53	The Big Wind	89	The Hammer of God	125	Blind into Doom
18	The Surgeon	54	Killer Group	90	The Power & the Privilege	126	Fire Storm
19	The Gunner	55	The Mistake	91	Headlong into Hell	127	The Iron Claw
20	The Recommend	56	Course To Intercept	92	Full Fathom Five	128	Attack!
21	The Coxswain	57	Creeping Attack	93	Not Wanted on Voyage	129	A Council of Captains
22	The Challenge	58	The Jaws of Hell	94	To The Death	130	The Kill
23	Convoy	59	Close And Investigate	95	The Last Stand	131	Court Martial
24	Find And Destroy	60	Flashpoint	96	Execute!	132	Operational Immediate
25	The Blind Eye	61	White Death	97	Object Destruction	133	Big Bill The Bastard
26	Eagles Over Taranto	62	The Deserter	98	Strike Force	134	Confirmed in Command
27	Escort Ship	63	The Misfit	99	Battle Hymn	135	The Dark of the Night
28	Fleet Destroyer	64	The Duel	100	The Big Hunt	136	Liberty Men
29	The Rocky	65	Whispering Death	101	Fog Blind	137	The Shadow
30	The Lesson	66	Point of Departure	102	Operation Jackal	138	Standoff
31	Battle Line	67	Loom of Ice	103	Died Fighting	139	Death of a Destroyer
32	The Long Haul	68	Behemoth	104	And The Heavens Spoke	140	Wall of Fire
33	Away Boarders!	69	Foul Ground	105	Circle of Fire	141	Don't Gimme The Ships
34	The First Lieutenant	70	The Unforgiving Sea	106	Decoyed		
35	U-Boat	71	Rat Island	107	For Valour		
36	Clear For Action	72	Broadsides!	108	Torrent of Fire		

==== The International Espionage Series ====
This series was first published in America by Signet under the pseudonym James Dark. It was later published in Australia by Horwitz Publications as J. E. Macdonnell and some titles were changed. Additional titles were used for some non-English language versions, as well. The year shown reflects the original American year of publication. Australian titles are shown only where they differ.

The International Espionage Series
No.	American Title	Year	Australian Title
JD1	Come Die With Me	1965	
JD2	The Bamboo Bomb	1965	
JD3	Hong Kong Incident	1966	Assignment: Hong Kong
JD4	Assignment Tokyo	1966	Operation MissSat
JD5	Spy from the Deep	1966	
JD6	Operation Scuba	1967	Caribbean Striker
JD7	Throne of Satan	1967	Black Napoleon
JD8	The Sword of Genghis Khan	1967	
JD9	Spying Blind	1968	
JD10	Operation Octopus	1968	
JD11	Operation Ice Cap	1969	
JD12	The Invisibles (Note: The Australian series numbers both this book and The Reluctant Assassin as JD13. JD12 is omitted. This appears to be a printing error.)	1969	
JD13	Sea Scrape	1970	The Reluctant Assassin

==== The Medical Series ====
This series was published by Horwitz Publications under the name J. E. Macdonnell. At least some titles were published as part of the J. E. Macdonnell Series, along with other Macdonnell titles. They were also released as a separate series numbered MS1 – MS12. At least two titles were published under the pseudonym Kerry Mitchell. Macdonnell may have written other medical romance novels released by Horwitz under the name Kerry Mitchell, as well. The back cover of one edition says of Macdonnell, in part, "...In researching for this series of medical novels, he has witnessed more than fifty major surgical operations – and only fainted once...!"

The Medical Series
No.	Title	Year
MS1	A Pair of Hands	1960
MS2	The Scalpel	1961
MS3	Flight 425	1961
MS4	The Doctor's Challenge	1961
MS5	Outback Emergency	1962
MS6	Doctor on Approval	1962
MS7	Wrong Diagnosis	1962
MS8	Doctor Defiant	1962
MS9	Sea Surgeon	1963
MS10	The Doctor's Experiment	1963
MS11	Doctor on Test	1963
MS12	The Doctor's Mistake	1967

== Notes ==
2. Commander Brady, Published by Constable 1956, Reprinted 1956, Corgi Books 1957, Re-issued 1971. Although this book is credited with J.E. Macdonnell as writer. The style of writing does not seem to be his.
