= John Dixon (cartoonist) =

Australian comic book artist and writer (1929–2015)

- Born: 20 February 1929; Newcastle, New South Wales, Australia
- Died: 7 May 2015 (aged 86); Bonsall, California, United States of America
- Occupations: Cartoonist, writer, illustrator, graphic designer
- Writing career
- Pen name: John Dangar Dixon
- Genres: Adventure, crime, pulp fiction

John Dixon (20 February 1929 – 7 May 2015) was an Australian comic book artist and writer, best known for his comic strip creation, Air Hawk and the Flying Doctors (which ran from 1959 until 1986).

== Biography ==
John Dangar Dixon was born in Newcastle on 20 February 1929, the son of a school principal. After completing his education at Cook Hill Intermediate High he became a trainee window dresser at a softgoods company. He then became interested in art and obtained a position as an advertising agent with the same company. Dixon moved to Sydney in 1945. After doing various advertising jobs, Dixon was advised to turn to the comics profession. He heeded the advice and wrote and drew his first comic book story, called The Sky Pirates, and showed it to Sydney publisher Henry John Edwards. Edwards bought Dixon's story, which appeared in Edwards' flagship comic book, Action, and offered Dixon a full-time contract to produce comic books.

A lifelong aviation enthusiast, Dixon's first comic book was Tim Valour, whose title character was an adventure-seeking pilot, who got involved in science-fiction-styled adventures. Dixon subsequently changed direction, making Valour into an agent of the International Security Organisation, battling saboteurs and super-villains. During the Korean War Valour and his sidekick, Happy, were pressed into military service flying American Sabre jet fighters. Tim Valour was incredibly popular and appeared in three separate series (a total of 150 issues) for close to a decade. The first series ran for 38 issues, featured 6d and 8d cover prices and was published under the H. John Edwards imprint. The second series actually began with issue No. 10 and lasted 41 issues. Cover prices went from 8d to 9d and it was published under Edwards' Action Comics imprint. The final series, titled Tim Valour – Commander of the Flying Tigerhawks, began with issue No. 11 and featured 9d and 1/- (one shilling) cover prices. Two Tim Valour Specials were also published in the 1950s.

Dixon's next title was The Crimson Comet, loosely based on the US comic book superhero, Red Raven. One of Australia's few true superhero comics, The Crimson Comet was a private investigator, Ralph Rivers, who stripped off his trenchcoat to reveal his bright red costume and huge wings grafted to his back. First appearing in 1949, The Crimson Comet fought criminal masterminds and spies before Dixon passed the comic on to Albert de Vine, returning to the series in the early 1950s. The first Crimson Comet series ran for 73 issues, with cover prices ranging between 6d-9d, and was published under the H. John Edwards imprint. The second series, believed to begin with issue No. 14, ran for 18 issues and carried 9d and 1/- cover prices. This series was published under Edwards' Action Comics label.

Dixon also illustrated several issues of Biggles, the Australian-made comic book adaptation of Captain W.E. Johns' famed aviator. Published by Action Comics between 1953 and 1957, Dixon's work appeared in issues #61–75. Dixon was also in demand with other Australian publishers. Young's Merchandising commissioned him to create a science fiction superhero comic called Captain Strato in 1958, which lasted just three issues.

The following year, he created the wartime adventure series The Phantom Commando for Horwitz Publications. Dixon wrote and drew the first three issues, before he passed the title on to longtime Horwitz artist, Maurice Bramley.

Frew Publications held the license to publish locally drawn versions of the defunct American superhero, Catman. After an initial series, illustrated by Jeff Wilkinson, appeared in Super Yank Comics between 1951–52, Frew recruited Dixon to create a new solo Catman comic book. Dixon produced 12 issues of Catman between 1957 and 1959, which were later reprinted by Photo Type Press between 1960 and 1966.

He left comics to concentrate on his comic strip, Air Hawk and the Flying Doctor, which premiered in Perth's Weekend Mail on 30 May 1959 and was subsequently published by other Australian Sunday newspapers, Sydney Sun Herald (14 June 1959), The Sunday Mail (Brisbane) and the Sunday Mail. In May 1963, Air Hawk also became a daily strip (unlike most US adventure strips, the Sunday and daily continuity on Air Hawk were separate stories with Dixon writing them both). By 1967 the strip was appearing not only in every Australian state, but also in Britain, New Zealand and South Africa. Dixon continued the strip until 1986, and throughout the years he has worked with assistants including Mike Tabrett, Hart Amos, Paul Power and Keith Chatto.

In 1985 and 1986 he won the Stanley Award, for 'Best Adventure/Illustrated Strip' for his Air Hawk strip, and again in 1992 for his US comics work.

In 1986 he moved to Washington, D.C. in the United States, where he worked as art-director of a magazine, Defense and Foreign Affairs, for five years. When the magazine ceased production he moved to California, returning to comics for a short while, working on various titles (Bloodshot, Eternal Warrior, H.A.R.D. Corps, Shadowman and Doctor Solar, Man of the Atom) for US publisher Valiant Comics, then as an independent illustrator for New York's Voyager Communications and as a storyboard artist for film and videogames.

He drew sixteen stories of Agent Corrigan that were published in a Swedish comic book from 1997 to 2003.

In 2012 he was diagnosed as suffering from Lewy Body Dementia, a type of dementia closely associated with Parkinson's disease.

In 2014 he was honoured with a Platinum Ledger Award for Lifetime Achievement in Australian Comics.

On 18 April 2015 Dixon suffered a major stroke at his home in California and on 7 May he died, surrounded by family. He was survived by his wife Sue and children, Andrew and Jaydi, Cindy and Anne, and sister Sheila.
