= Hart Amos =

Australian cartoonist

- Born: Hartley Vincent Amos; 2 December 1916; Lindfield, New South Wales, Australia
- Died: 8 June 2000 (aged 83)
- Occupations: Cartoonist, illustrator
- Writing career
- Period: 1945–1977

Hart Amos (2 December 1916 – 8 June 2000), was an Australian comic strip writer and artist.

== Biography ==
Hartley Vincent Amos was born in Lindfield, New South Wales on 2 December 1916, the eldest son of an insurance company manager.

Amos attended Artarmon Public School and North Sydney Boys High School before joining the brewing firm of Tooth and Co. as a clerk in the firm's advertising department. In 1933 he enrolled at East Sydney Technical College where he studied life drawing and oil painting until the end of 1937. He was close friends with his cousin, Paul Brickhill (the best-selling author of The Great Escape, The Dam Busters, and Reach for the Sky) and Peter Finch (Academy Award winning actor).

== Later in life ==
Due to the shortage of work Amos joined the army in 1938, enlisting as a signaller in the 7th Field Artillery but eventually becoming the unit’s camouflager, serving in New Guinea and Borneo, and obtaining the rank of Lieutenant, before he was discharged on 21 December 1945. Still wanting a career in the art world he sold cartoons to Rydges and Quiz before worked freelance for K.G. Murray Publishing Company. Amos' first assignment for K.G. Murray was to draw a full comic book, The Lost Patrol. The strip dealt with Australian soldiers fighting in New Guinea against the Japanese, for which he was able to call upon his own first-hand experience. Amos went on to produce a further series of comics, including The Moon Mirror, Stark, The Stoneage Man, Kidnap Cavern, Queen of the Green Men and Hurricane Hardy, at which time he was offered the job of illustrating the Devil Doone comic strip, written by Ron Carson-Gold, which appeared in the Man Junior Magazine. Devil Doone was a soldier of fortune strip that had previously been handled for a brief period by June Mendoza and Carl Lyon. Amos took over the strip in April 1946 and continued to draw the monthly strip for 44 issues until the middle of 1969. Devil Doone was also reprinted in comic book form. Writing in Cartoonists in Australia (View Productions, 1983), Amos recalled: "During all this time...I had not taken a holiday and was slipping into the trap of work overload. And one morning the trap snapped shut...I hit a psychological block and found I couldn't draw a damn thing! Frightened stiff, I had to quit Murray magazines and ease off from the pressure of publishing deadlines."

After leaving K.G. Murray, Amos was persuaded to take on the illustration work for John Dixon's comic strip, Air Hawk and the Flying Doctors. His first pages for Air Hawk and the Flying Doctors appeared in March 1970 with his last one published in June 1977, when he decided to retire from comic strip illustrations.
