= Forum Media Group =

German media company

FORUM MEDIA GROUP GmbH
- Industry: Media, Publishing
- Founded: 1988
- Founder: Ronald Herkert
- Headquarters: Merching, Germany
- Products: books, magazines, loose leafes, forms, online portals, software, training, seminars, congresses
- Revenue: 110 million EUR (2017)
- Number of employees: 1,200 (2018)

The FORUM MEDIA GROUP (FMG) is an international media company headquartered near Munich (Germany) with leading professional publishing houses worldwide. In 2021, the FMG achieved a turnover of more than 100 million Euro and employed almost 1,100 employees in Europe, Asia, North America, and Australia.

Founded in 1988, The FORUM MEDIA GROUP companies also offer special interest publications, magazines, and events.

Since 1992, the FORUM MEDIA GROUP shows an average growth rate of total sales by 18% p.a. In 2017, the FMG ranked as 14th of Germany's "20 largest professional publishing houses".

== Publishing Houses ==
The core business areas of the FORUM MEDIA GROUP are information, education, and entertainment - especially for B2B customers. In the B2B area, the FMG publishing houses prepare professional information for very defined target groups. In addition to print media like books, magazines, loose leafes, and forms, the FMG portfolio contains a major share of digital media like online portals, software, DVDs, and newsletters.

The education units of the FMG media houses also organize conferences, seminars, and special trainings for business professionals. Some publishing houses of the FORUM MEDIA GROUP are also focussed on special interest products for B2C customers, e.g. Nextmedia in Sydney.

The FMG serves more than 20 national markets with publishing companies and branches in 18 countries.
