= Nextmedia =

Australian media company

- Formerly: Next Publishing
- Industry: Publishing
- Founded: 2007
- Headquarters: Sydney, Australia
- Key people: Arek Widawski (CEO)
- Products: Magazines
- Parent: Forum Media Group
- Website: www.nextmedia.com.au

Nextmedia Pty Limited (styled as nextmedia) is an Australian media company which publishes special interest magazines in the sport, humor, and hobby (among others). The company is headquartered in Sydney and owned by The Forum Media Group, a German-based B2B and B2C publisher.

Nextmedia is Australia's foremost special interest digital and print media publisher, and has become the country's fourth-largest magazine publishing group.

Nextmedia was established in 2008, as a new entrant to the special interest publishing sector. Nextmedia was managed by CEO David Gardiner and Commercial Director Bruce Duncan until 2018, when Duncan retired, Hamish Bayliss was appointed Managing Director, and David Gardiner 'stepped back' to a role as Executive Chairman. In 2020, Arek Widawski was appointed a CEO of Nextmedia.

== History ==
Nextmedia was founded in 2007 by acquiring the publishing assets of four companies:

- Horwitz Publications (founded 1960)
- Next Publishing (founded 1987)
- Chevron Publishing Group (founded 1988)
- Bluewater Publishing (founded 2006)

In 2013, Nextmedia itself was acquired by the Forum Media Group. Shortly thereafter, Nextmedia acquired the assets of Haymarket Media Pty Ltd.

In 2018, consumer computing and tech assets (including Atomic, Hyper, PC PowerPlay, and PC Tech & Authority) were sold to Future plc. Future subsequently acquired more consumer titles of Nextmedia including Australian Camera, Australian Guitar, Australian Hi-Fi, ProPhoto, and Sound+Image.

== Magazines ==
- Australian Muscle Car
- frankie
- FTBL
- Golf Australia
- Healthy Food Guide
- Inside Sport
- K-Zone
- Mad
- Motor Racing Australia
- Old Bike
- Tracks
- Total Girl
- V8 Supercars and V8 Bathurst

=== Out of print magazines ===
- Blunt
- GBA World (2002–2004)
- Geare
- Internet.AU
- MAX Magazine
- N64 Gamer
- Nintendo Gamer (2001–2003, 2007) *not to be confused with Nintendo Gamer (UK)
- Official Australian PlayStation Magazine (first edition)
- PC & Tech Authority
- PSW
- Smart Home Ideas
- Soap World
- Total Gamer
- TV Soap
- The Wiggles
- Waves
- Yen

== Websites ==
- IT News
- IT News Asia
- Digital Nation
- MyMagazines
- Techpartner News
