= Rigby (publisher) =

Australian book publisher

Rigby Limited was an Australian book publisher, based in Adelaide. Their output consisted largely, but not exclusively, of Australian subjects, especially non-fiction, by Australian writers and artists.

== History ==
=== The founder ===
William Charles Rigby (March 1834 – 14 July 1913) was born in London. His parents had intended for him the life of a hatter, but he was attracted to bookselling, so was apprenticed to Parker & Sons of London and Oxford, where George Robertson and Samuel Mullen (both became bookshop owners in Melbourne) were fellow workers. (Note: Not to be confused with the George Robertson of Angus & Robertson fame, this George Robertson founded Robertson & Co. of Little Collins Street, and Mullen founded Mullen, Melville, and Slade, which became Melville & Mullen. Robertson and Mullen first met while working in a bookshop in Dublin; Mullen, at least, later worked for Parker and Sons.)

Thinking to make his fortune on the goldfields of Victoria, he purchased the 48-ton lugger Gem, previously associated with a yachting club at Ryde, Isle of Wight, and in 1853 set out for the colonies with his young wife Harriet and their son, her parents (Mr and Mrs Caple), sister Fanny Caple and a crew of seven, presumably including a navigator/captain; thirteen in all. A large crowd gathered at Southampton to witness the departure of the tiny craft. The voyage was long and hard, a total of 18 weeks, and at one point they were driven ashore, possibly on Kangaroo Island, but managed to get her free without damage. They entered Port Phillip Bay, sailed up the Yarra River without benefit of a pilot, and without following pratique, formalizing the voyage after the event. The crew disembarked and without waiting for their pay made off for Ballarat.

Rigby had intended the Gem for service on the Yarra, but found her unsuited to the purpose (or was frustrated by years of litigation), and eventually the little vessel was sold by auction for a fraction of her value, perhaps ending up in the South Australian coastal shipping fleet.

Rigby spent six years at the diggings without making his fortune, then moved to Adelaide, where in 1859, with five cases of stock to a total value of £229 16 7d., he opened a book shop at 53 Hindley Street, in those days the premier shopping strip. Set into the pavement in front of his shop were blue and white tiles, proclaiming "W. C. Rigby — Bookseller, Stationer, and Newsagent". He had such an understanding of the literary tastes and commercial requirements of Adelaide that his business prospered and in 1875 he took the lease on vacant land at 74 King William Street, and erected a new building, artistically decorated with oil paintings which were periodically refreshed.

In 1901 he was able to purchase the King William Street property freehold from the Montefiore estate for £4,000. In 1909, at age 75, Rigby retired, and the business was sold to a limited liability company, registered in September 1909, retaining the name of the founder.

He died at his home "St Heliers", 40 Third Avenue, East Adelaide, and his remains interred at the West Terrace Cemetery.

==== Family ====
William Rigby married Harriet Caple at Greenwich, United Kingdom in 1852. They had one child born in London, before emigrating to Australia, and a further six children born in Australia. Three children died in infancy (Harry born in 1856, Charles born in 1860 and Ada born 1863). The children to survive to adulthood were as follows:

- William James Rigby (1853–1894) was born in London. He married Laura Cutchett in 1885, but they did not have any children. William Jr worked in his father's stationery business and pre-deceased his father.
- Mary Rigby (1848–1940) was born in Melbourne. She married Alexander Ringwood in 1883 and they had four children.
- Ada Rigby (1866–1939) was born in Adelaide. She married Friedrich Von Einem in 1913. They did not have any children.
- Lillian Rigby (1871–1926) was born in Adelaide. She married Max Meth (c. 1862 – 11 December 1947) in 1890. They had two children, including a son, Max W. Rigby-Meth, who was an actor in England.

Harriet Rigby née Caple died on 28 November 1872.

=== Rigby Limited ===
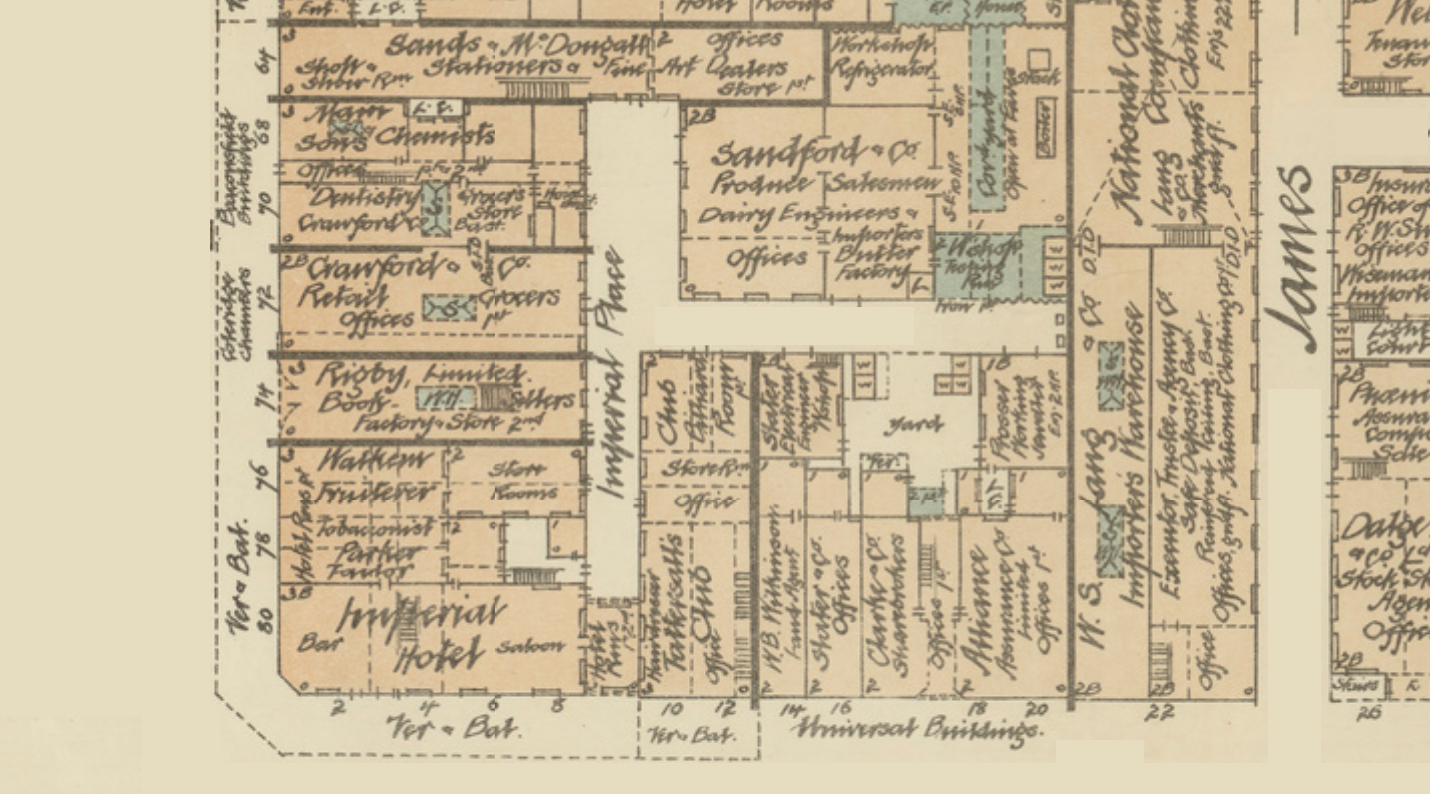
King Wm / Grenfell streets in 1911

J. M. Bath joined the firm in September 1912, and the proprietors decided to realise its value, and sell the lease, while selling the business to George Fraser, of Sands & McDougall, with an eye to amalgamating the two companies. As a result of the Great War of 1914–18 nothing eventuated and on 1 May 1917 Fraser sold his shares to Bath, who negotiated a 30-year lease of the King William Street property, then in 1924 sold the building and lease to Army and Navy Stores, Ltd. In the meantime Bath secured the lease on Sandford's warehouse behind the shop, on Imperial Place, from which premises business continued to expand.

In 1932 he purchased Herbert Small's Electrolux shop adjoining at 16 Grenfell Street, and the Rundle Street branch of Cole's Book Arcade. (Note: This was long after E. W. Cole's death, and the company's only outlet in Melbourne was a modest establishment on Swanston Street, the famous Book Arcade having been liquidated around 1925.)

Bath died in 1946 and V. M. Branson took over as managing director. The company began publishing textbooks for South Australian schools, followed by books of general interest by and for Australians. Branches were opened in Melbourne, Sydney and Brisbane in the 1950s, with an up-to-date distribution centre in James Place, Adelaide. A Perth office opened in 1962.

In 1965 Horwitz and Rigby merged to become Australia’s largest publisher.

In January 1967 Michael Page joined the company as its Publishing Manager. In 1973 the company changed owners and Branson left. During his reign the number of employees increased from 44 to over 200 and, towards the end, hundreds of new titles were published every year.

In 1977 the Paul Hamlyn Group, through its Octopus Books subsidiary, purchased 10.48 per cent of Rigby's capital from "the Adelaide-based Motors Group, ... owned by entrepreneur Mr. W. H. Hayes", which was opposed by "Australia's other local publishers".

By 1977 Rigby had become Australia's largest book publisher.

In 1978-79 Hamlyn Group RCI (James Hardie) took over Rigby. By 1984 all Rigby staff had been dismissed. It survived "for a while" as a subdivision of Reed Elsevier.

==== People ====
John Morley Bath (c. 1880 – 3 June 1946) became company secretary around 1917 and managing director from c. 1934.

Vernon Mostyn Branson (1908 – 21 June 1992) was manager from 1946, managing director from 1950 to 1973. He was author of

- V. M. Branson (1966) The Art of Ivor Hele
- V. M. Branson (1976) The Rigby Saga
- V. M. Branson (1981) The Golden Years of Apex 1956–1981 ISBN 9780909854102
- V. M. Branson, Bevan Rutt (1982) Lead with a Watchful Eye: The Silver Jubilee of Guide Dogs in Australia ISBN 9780867700244
- V. M. Branson (1983) Kooyonga 1923–1983, the Story of a Golf Club ISBN 9780959115208
- Trevor Goulding, V. M. Branson (1988) Landmarks of Adelaide, A Sketchbook ISBN 9780867700558
- Douglas Luck, V. M. Branson (1979) Sketches of Murray Bridge ISBN 9780959465204

also Clare and District Sketchbook (1974), Victor Harbor and District Sketchbook (1974), Southern Vales Sketchbook (1977), . . .

== Book series ==
- Alcheringa Series - published in association with Bill Onus's 1962 television series on ABC Television
- Australian Men of Letters
- Australian Pocket Books
- Colourful Australia Series
- Fast Tracks
- Humphrey B. Bear Book
- Opal Young
- Reading Rigby
- Rigby Books of Australia
- Rigby Field Guide Series
- Rigby Instant Books
- Rigby Jumbo Instant Books
- Rigby Moving Into Maths
- Rigby Opal Books
- Rigby Sketchbook Series
- Rigby Social Studies Series
- Rigby's Pageant of Australia
- Rigby's Reading Development Series
- Rigby Study Guide Series
- Seal Books
