= Air Hawk and the Flying Doctors =

Air Hawk and the Flying Doctor Sunday strip by Hart Amos, 1973

Air Hawk and the Flying Doctors was an Australian comic strip created by John Dixon. The strip began publication on 30 May 1959, premiering in the Saturday issue of Perth's Weekend Mail. It was subsequently published by other Australian Sunday newspapers, Sydney's The Sun-Herald (14 June 1959), Brisbane's The Sunday Mail and Adelaide's Sunday Mail. In May 1963, 'Air Hawk' also became a daily strip and unlike most US adventure strips, the Sunday and daily continuity on 'Air Hawk' were separate stories with Dixon writing them both. By 1967 the strip was appearing not only in every Australian state, but also in Britain, New Zealand, South Africa, France, and both North and South America. Dixon continued the strip until 1986. Dixon was assisted over the years by Mike Tabrett, Hart Amos (March 1970 – June 1977), and Keith Chatto (1977-onwards). Chatto had previously ghosted the daily strip for a short period in 1972 before he took over drawing the Sunday version of the strip in the middle of 1977.

In 1962 a series of Air Hawk and the Flying Doctors comics were published by Howitz Publications, the series however only ran for three issues. This was followed by another series of comics by Page Publications, reprinting episodes of the strip, with covers by Chatto. The Page series debuted in 1966, also only running for three issues, began with issue #20, but the title was altered to The Hawk and the Flying Doctors on the third issue. Although Dixon ceased the strip in 1986, the strip continued to be reprinted in the Sydney Morning Herald until the early 1990s.

The strip is set in the Australian outback, and follows the adventures of Jim Hawk, a former Royal Australian Air Force pilot flying and intelligent agent, who operates the Air Hawk Charter service from Alice Springs. The charter service worked in conjunction with the Royal Flying Doctor Service (RFDS). Dr Hal Mathews was a close friend of Jim Hawk who worked for the RFDS and Sister Janet Grant belonged to the Australian Inland Mission, whose medical clinic adjoined the air strip. In the mid-seventies, Jim Hawk was granted a franchise to supply a special Emergency Relief Unit. The Unit's function is to relieve any Flying Doctor base in need of assistance and to be available for special emergencies. Hal Mathews had been seconded to work with the Unit and Janet Grant was now his full-time assistant, with the change in responsibilities, the 'Doctors' part of the title was reverted to the singular. Routine charter operations were continuously disrupted by Jim Hawk's involvement in conflict with local and international villains.

== Reprints ==
In the 1980s Queensland comic enthusiast, Nat Karmichael, published John Dixon's Air Hawk Magazine. While the first few issues had small print runs of just 500 copies, later issues were being sold through newsagents. One issue was co-published with Cyclone! Comics, who released it as one of their 'Summer Specials'.

Selected storylines were reprinted in the book, John Dixon, Air Hawk and the Flying Doctor Volume 1, published by Comicoz in 2011.

A second volume John Dixon's Air Hawk and the Flying Doctor: A Second Volume, was published by Comicoz in late 2013.

== Adaptation ==
The comic book was adapted into the 1981 film Airhawk with Eric Oldfield as Jim Hawk.
