= Ken Emerson =

Australian cartoonist (1927 - 2010)

- Born: Kenneth Albert Emerson; 9 July 1927 Sydney, New South Wales
- Died: 12 February 2010 (aged 82)
- Area: Cartoonist
- Notable works: The Warrumbunglers; On The Rocks
- Awards: Stanley Award

Kenneth Albert Emerson (9 July 1927 – 12 February 2010) was an Australian cartoonist and comic strip creator. He is best known for writing the comic strips The Warrumbunglers (Note: The Warrumbunglers title is sometimes written with a hyphen (The Warrum-bunglers) but this is most likely a stylistic decision to fit the long title within one panel of the comic strip.) and On The Rocks. Emerson was the son-in-law of cartoonist Eric Jolliffe.

== Background ==
Emerson was born in Sydney, the son of Albert Emerson and his wife, Ruth (Booth), who had emigrated from Belfast. He had one brother, Alf. His father died from malaria, which he contracted whilst they were based in New Guinea. His mother remarried and had another son, Denis. He spent part of his youth working in central Queensland. After leaving school, Emerson experienced a wide range of jobs including greaser, surveyor's assistant, barman, stagehand, boilermaker's assistant and builder's labourer. He spent three years studying art at East Sydney Technical College before travelling to New Zealand, where his brother Alf had moved to. In New Zealand he worked in assorted jobs including as a freelance artist.

On his return to Sydney, Emerson subsequently became a full-time artist. His began as a commercial artist and photograph retoucher in advertising, then went on to television animation before returning to advertising, where he remained until 1976.

== Cartoonist ==
In May 1960 had a comic strip, Bush Folks, accepted by the Australian Woman's Mirror. In November 1960 the magazine was taken over by Australian Consolidated Press, following which it was merged with the Weekend. The two magazines had nothing in common and ended up being called Everybody's. The strip was dropped but Emerson continued to sell cartoons to the new magazine for several years before it folded late in 1967.

In 1967 Emerson began drawing the outback comic strip The Warrumbunglers, originally for The Sunday Telegraph, where it was dropped in July 1969 only to re-appear in The Sun-Herald in December 1969. It was dropped again in 1971 and didn't re-appear until May 1977 as one of the replacement strips for Fatty Finn. The Warrumbunglers became Australia's second-longest running comic strip; Emerson completed his last strip shortly before his death.

The Warrumbunglers featured numerous Australian animals, kangaroos, echidnas, bandicoots, goannas and koalas, as an anthropomorphic community. The strip's themes reflect mateship, tall tales and bush sayings.

In February 1974 Sydney's The Sun published Emerson's, pseudo-colonial convict comic strip, On The Rocks, where it ran until 2001. The strip featured the exploits of Floyd Fingal, a transported con-man, Major Upheaval, a paymaster with the New South Wales Rum Corps, the bumbling Colonial Governor and his hopeless aide, De Camp. In August 1975 it was bought by Brisbane's Sunday Mail and the name of the strip was changed to Ball and Chain. The strip continued in The Sun-Herald until late April 1988.

In 1986 Emerson was awarded the Stanley Award for best comic strip by the Australian Cartoonists' Association.

=== Ginger Meggs ===
Ginger Meggs is an iconic Australian comic strip. Following the deaths of its creator Jimmy Bancks in 1952 and his replacement Ron Vivian in 1973, Emerson was one of several artists who submitted drawings to take over the strip. The role, however, went to Lloyd Piper. When Piper died in 1984 Emerson again applied for the job and was appointed. As he already had two strips published in The Sun-Herald, he was asked to drop either The Warrumbunglers or On The Rocks in favour of Ginger Meggs. He declined, and the role was offered instead to James Kemsley.

== Personal ==
In 1956 he married Margaret 'Meg' Jolliffe (the daughter of Eric Jolliffe), whom he met whilst studying at the East Sydney Technical College. In 1963 they had a daughter, Jane, who is a graphic artist. Meg died in 1997 and Emerson died on 12 February 2010.

== Anthologies ==
- The Warrumbunglers
- On The Rocks
- The Warrumbunglers bushed! (1983)
- On The Rocks No. 2 (1983)
- The Warrumbunglers No. 3 (1984)
- On The Rocks No. 3 (1984)
