= Syd Nicholls =

Australian cartoonist (1896-1977)

Sydney Nicholls
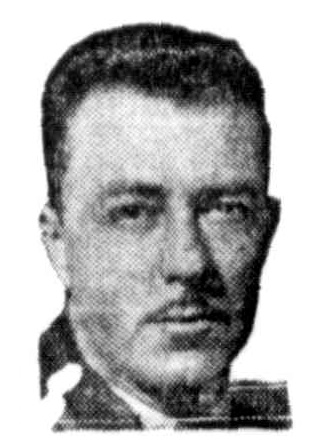
- Photograph of Syd Nicholls, published in 1934.
- Born: Sydney Wentworth Jordan; 20 December 1896; Frederick Henry Bay, Tasmania, Australia
- Died: 3 June 1977 (aged 80); Potts Point, New South Wales, Australia
- Occupations: Cartoonist, illustrator
- Spouse: Roberta Clarice Vickery
- Parent(s): Hubert George Jordan (father); Arabella Cluidunning (née Bartsche) (mother)
- Writing career
- Pen name: Syd Nicholls

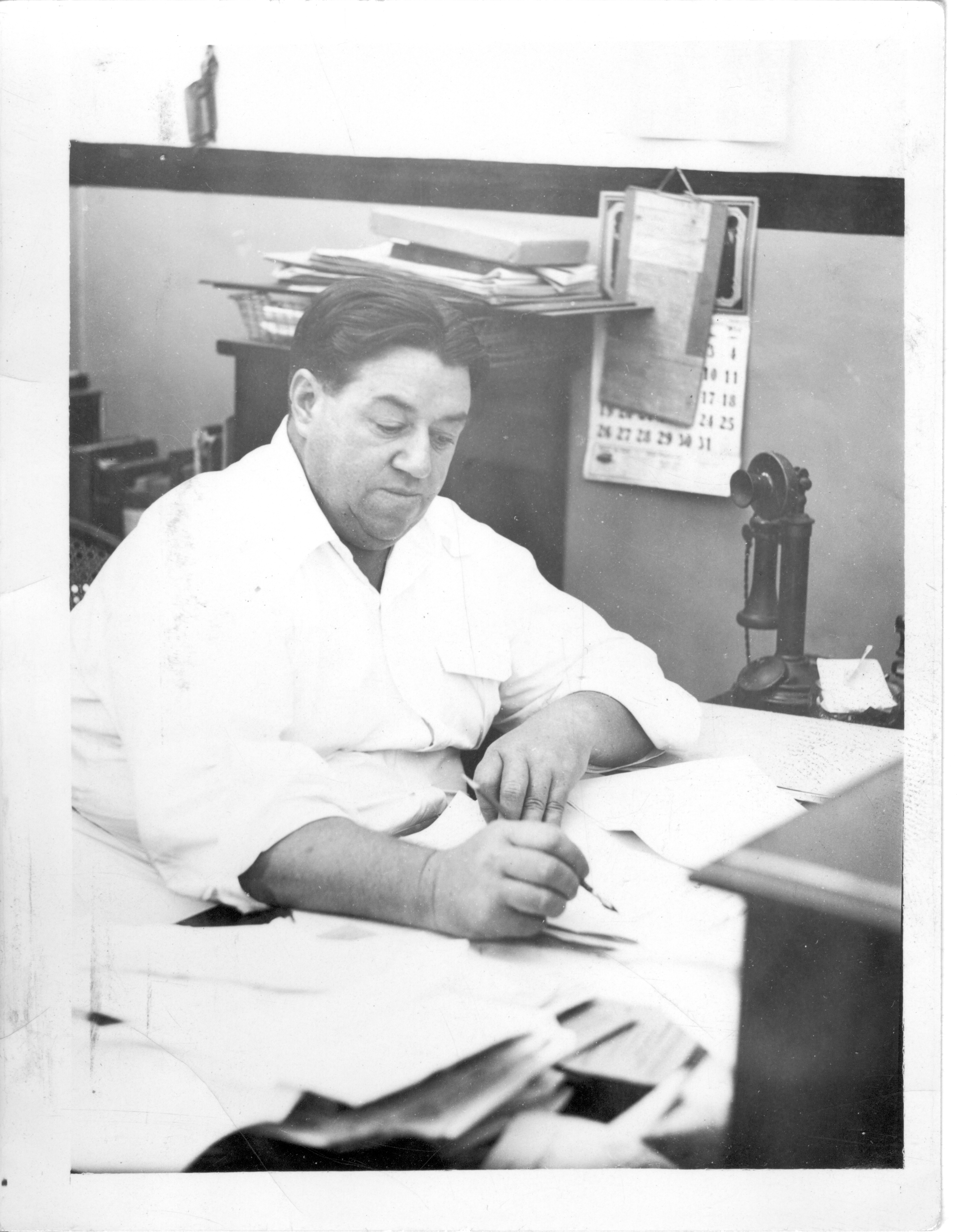
Nicholls at his desk, date unknown

Sydney 'Syd' Wentworth Nicholls (20 December 1896 – 3 June 1977) was an Australian cartoonist and commercial artist, best known for the long-running comic strip Fatty Finn.

== Biography ==
Syd Nicholls was born in Frederick Henry Bay, Tasmania on 20 December 1896, the son of a watchmaker Hubert George Jordan and his wife Arabella Cluidunning, née Bartsche. He adopted his stepfather's surname when his mother remarried in 1907. The family moved to New Zealand and Nicholls attended a wide variety of schools in New Zealand and New South Wales before taking his first job with the printing firm of W.E. Smith in 1910. He studied for seven years under Norman Carter and Antonio Dattilo Rubbo at the Royal Art Society of New South Wales.

His first published work appeared in the International Socialist in 1912, at the age of sixteen and by the time he was eighteen he was having cartoons accepted by The Bulletin, Australian Worker and Australasian Seaman's Journal. Politically committed, Nicholls contributed cartoons to Direct Action, the publication of the Industrial Workers of the World. In 1914 one of these cartoons was instrumental in the paper's editor, Tom Barker, being sentenced to 12 months in jail for 'publishing material prejudicial to recruitment'. Nicholls's art titles for Raymond Longford's film, The Sentimental Bloke in 1919, brought him work for other films. In 1920 he visited the US to study art-title designs for motion pictures. On his return to Sydney, he joined the staff of the Sydney Evening News in 1923 as senior artist. Sir Errol Knox, the editor, asked him to create a comic in colour for the Sunday News supplement to compete with Us Fellers drawn by Jimmy Bancks for the rival Sydney Sunday Sun.

Nicholls produced Fat and His Friends, first published on 16 September 1923. 'Initially presented as a Billy Bunterish comedy figure, complete with straw boater, Fatty Finn evolved . . . into a knockabout schoolboy innocently living out his days in a never-never urban world'. In August 1924 the title of the strip was changed to Fatty Finn, heralding a change in the strip's direction and the role of the main character. Fatty Finn came to be recognised as one of the best-drawn comics in Australia and vied with Ginger Meggs in popularity.

In 1927 a film called The Kid Stakes was produced by Tal Ordell, featuring Fatty Finn and his goat, Hector. The film also contained a segment showing Nicolls at his drawing board, creating his famous characters. Three coloured Fatty Finn Annuals were published during 1928–30. The strip survived the absorptions of the Sunday News into the Sunday Guardian (1930) and of the latter by the Sunday Sun (1931). Nicholls had twice tried, in 1928 and 1929, to introduce a dream sequence into Fatty Finn, involving pirates, cannibals and highwaymen, but was forced by Knox to return to his original comic style. Believing that there was public interest, Nicholls drew one of the world's first adventure strips, Middy Malone, but could find no publisher. In 1931 he went to New York, seeking an outlet for Middy Malone. He recalled in an interview in 1973 that, 'Trying to place my new adventure series I found that any time I tried to compete with the local boys . . . it was a closed shop'.

Back in Sydney, Nicholls again unavailingly offered Middy Malone to a number of newspapers. Sacked without explanation in May 1933, he decided to publish his own comic books. Middy Malone in the Lost World appeared in the late 1930s; other Middy Malone adventures and the Fatty Finn Weekly, tabloid-sized, sold well. Comic books by other artists quickly followed. Unable to compete with increasing paper costs and cheap, imported American comics, Nicholls's publishing company was put out of business in 1950. Nicholls and Fatty Finn returned to newspapers, in the Sunday Herald in December 1951. Following the merger (1953) of the Sunday Herald and Sunday Sun and Guardian, they continued in the new Sun-Herald. The rivalry with Ginger Meggs was rekindled.

At the district registrar's office, Paddington, on 29 August 1942 Nicholls had married Roberta Clarice Vickery, a 25-year-old commercial artist. After being involved in having the Sydney Press Club stripped of its licence, Nicholls was a founder (1939), president (1942–44) and vice-president (1947–49 and 1957–59) of the Journalists' Club. He also chaired the New South Wales authors' and artists' section of the Australian Journalists' Association. From the late 1940s his artwork aided the New South Wales Teachers' Federation in many of its campaigns.

A portrait of Nicholls was painted by fellow Journalists' Club member William Pidgeon who painted the portraits of practically every club president up to 1976.

== Death ==
While in a state of mental depression, Syd Nicholls fell to his death from the balcony next door to his tenth-floor Potts Point apartment on 3 June 1977.

== Bibliography ==
- Pitt, Stanley John; Ashley, Frank (1942). Anthony Fury. Consolidated Press.
- Ashley, Frank; Pitt, S. J. (Stanley John) (1946). Silver Starr. Apache Comics; Melbourne : Distributors: Gordon & Gotch (A/asia).
- Pitt, S. J. (Stanley John) (1949). Captain Power. Ayers and James Pty. Ltd.
- Ashley, Frank; Pitt, Reginald; Pitt, S. J. (Stanley John) (1949). Yarmak : Jungle King. Young's Merchandising Co : Sydney, NSW.
