= Lloyd Piper =

Australian cartoonist and art teacher

- Born: Lloyd William Piper; 31 October 1923 Cassilis, New South Wales, Australia
- Died: 5 September 1983 (aged 59) Australia
- Notable works: Catman; Wolfe; Ginger Meggs

Lloyd Piper (31 October 1923 – 5 September 1983) was an Australian cartoonist and art teacher, best known as the third artist to take on the iconic Australian comic strip, Ginger Meggs, which he drew from 1973 until his death in 1983.

== Biography ==
Lloyd William Piper was born on 31 October 1923 in Cassilis, New South Wales to Thomas William Piper and Alice Mabel née Byfield. He grew up in rural New South Wales during the Great Depression. At age nineteen Piper enrolled in the Australian Army, serving in the 2nd/2nd Australian Field Regiment in New Guinea from 1942 until 1946, he was discharged in November 1946. Following his war service he completed a Rehabilitation Training course and moved to Sydney.

Piper illustrated comic strips including Catman and Kalar the Caveman for Frew Publications' comic book, Super Yank Comics. Catman was a feline-styled caped crusader who, unlike the original American version of the character, had no secret identity or powers. The other noticeable difference was that Catman's sidekick was changed from a young girl, Kitten, to a young boy, Kit. Catman ran for 19 issues, between 1951 and 1952. According to Jim Shepherd (the late publisher and managing director of Frew Publications), "[Frew co-founder], Ron Forsyth had an almost strange habit of changing things in the imported titles he published. He didn't like females having or sharing top billing, hence his request to replace Kitten with Kit – but he probably also thought it might be some sort of plug for the young Phantom character, also known as Kit."

Piper also created Steel Barr for OPC's Hurricane in 1946 and Lemmy Loo as a filler strip for K.G Murray's Captain Triumph Comics (October 1949 – February 1950). Steel Barr was resurrected by Young's Merchandising in 1950, under the title Steel Barr and The Phantom Man. Australian comic book researcher, Kevin Patrick, describes Steel Barr as being "a granite-jawed District Commissioner who patrolled the African jungles, battling myriad threats while searching for his elusive opponent, The Phantom Man."

Piper subsequently became an advertising layout artist, working in the advertising industry for the next twenty two years. He also taught Graphic Design part-time, from 1970 until 1983, at the National Art School.

In October 1972 the Sunday Telegraph commissioned Piper to draw a comic strip, Wolfe, for which ran for six years before it was dropped in favour of a syndicated American superhero. Wolfe was a wandering adventurer. According to John Ryan, in his Australian Comic anthology, Panel by Panel, "Wolfe's strength was its strong story line and the fact Piper restricted his wanderings to Australia, giving readers an opportunity to identify with the various suburbs and country towns – and it was these aspects that attracted a large following for the strip." Following the death of Ron Vivian Piper was invited by Jimmy Bancks's family to take over the role of writing and illustrating Ginger Meggs, which was also published by the Sun Telegraph. Piper was the first of Bancks' successors permitted to sign his name to the strip. On 27 August 1977 the Ginger Meggs strip moved back to Sun Herald replacing long time rival comic strip, Fatty Finn. Piper claimed he kept as close as he could to the Bancks style with Ginger Meggs, and in an interview in 1983, stated "I have worked 30 years in advertising. I understand all the aspects of other peoples wants. I have striven to maintain Bancks' character, but admit that his sense of humour was so individual, his successors can hope for, but never really match it." He also told friends it was "just a job", and that "they don't pay me much and they get what they pay for".

== Personal life ==
In 1953 Piper married Essie Gwendoline 'Gwen' Armstrong and they had one son, John William Piper (born 1956). Piper died in a car accident on 5 September 1983.
