= Jason Chatfield =

- Born: 1984 (age 41–42); Perth, Western Australia, Australia
- Occupations: Cartoonist, illustrator, gag cartoonist, stand-up comedian, improv comedian, producer
- Website: www.jasonchatfield.com

Jason Chatfield (born 1984) is an Australian cartoonist and stand-up comedian, based in New York City. At 23 he became Australia's most widely syndicated cartoonist, appearing daily in over 120 newspapers in 34 countries. His art spans the disciplines of comic strip, gag cartoon, editorial cartoon, book illustration, caricature and commercial art. His work has appeared in The New Yorker, Variety, Airmail, WIRED, The Weekly Humorist, and Mad magazine. At 26 he was elected president of the Australian Cartoonists' Association, and later served as the 36th President of the National Cartoonists Society. He is the youngest person to hold both positions since the organizations began.

== Ginger Meggs ==
Chatfield took over writing and drawing the iconic internationally syndicated comic strip Ginger Meggs in 2007, becoming the strip's fifth artist, succeeding James Kemsley. Kemsley wrote to the Bancks family to secure approval for Chatfield to succeed him. Ginger Meggs is currently syndicated by Andrews McMeel Universal to 34 countries.

On 1 July 2011, the Perth Mint released a commemorative 1oz Silver Australian $1 coin to celebrate the 90th anniversary year of Ginger Meggs. The coin's design pays homage to Bancks’ 1945 Sunbeams Annual (Series 22) cover, which featured Ginger Meggs on the back of a kangaroo with his dog, Mike and his pet monkey, Tony. The obverse portrays the Ian Rank-Broadley effigy of Her Majesty Queen Elizabeth II, the 2011 year-date and is issued as legal tender under the Australian Currency Act 1965. There were 3000 coins produced in total. The coin was designed by Chatfield with the assistance of fellow Australian artist Peter Broelman. Stock at the mint sold out within an hour of the coin being announced.

Swiss company Redheads also released a limited edition of matchboxes featuring five custom Ginger Meggs designs, produced by Chatfield.

In January 2017, an online-only version of Ginger Meggs was launched under the name of "Instameggs". The site is designed for young fans to read the comic strip on their phone, scrolling vertically as they would on Instagram. Instameggs was eventually replaced by a daily feed on Instagram.

On 4 May 2021, Penguin Books released a hardback novelisation of Ginger Meggs, written by children's author Tristan Bancks and illustrated by Chatfield. The book contains 4 new stories based on the Ginger Meggs comic strip canon.

On 2 June 2021, to commemorate the centenary of the first appearance of Ginger Meggs, The Royal Australian Mint released a series of commemorative Australian $1 coins with Ginger Meggs designs from 1921 and 2021. The obverse portrays the Ian Rank-Broadley effigy of Her Majesty Queen Elizabeth II, the 2021 year-date and is issued as legal tender under the Australian Currency Act 1965.

On 7 September 2021, to commemorate the centenary of the first appearance of Ginger Meggs, a series of stamps was released by Australia Post. Ginger Meggs appears not just in the stamp designs but also in a host of philatelic products, including a minisheet, stamp pack, first day cover, a maxicard set and two stamp and coin covers, housing coins produced by the Royal Australian Mint.

== Comedy ==
Chatfield has performed stand-up comedy since 2007. He has performed and produced shows at the Melbourne International Comedy Festival (2008, 2009, 2011, 2012, 2013). He performs regularly in New York City and at clubs and colleges around the United States. He has been represented by CESD Talent Agency for voice acting work since 2015. He is managed by Avanti Talent Management.

He has appeared in multiple national commercials in the United States. In November and December 2020, he appeared the TV series on the Food Network, Buddy vs Christmas as a host and judge.

== Professional affiliations ==
National Cartoonists Society:

- 2015–2019: Vice President of National Cartoonists Society
- 2019–2023: President of National Cartoonists Society

Australian Cartoonists' Association:

- 2006-2008: WA Vice President of the Australian Cartoonists' Association.
- 2008-2010: Deputy President of the Australian Cartoonists' Association.
- 2010-2012: President of the Australian Cartoonists' Association.
- 2012-2014: Deputy President of the Australian Cartoonists' Association.
- 2014-2016: Deputy President of the Australian Cartoonists' Association.

== Awards and nominations ==
- 2005: Winner, Bill Mitchell Award for Best Young Australian Cartoonist at the Australian Cartoonists' Association Stanley Awards.
- 2008: Finalist, Gold Stanley (Cartoonist of the Year) at the Australian Cartoonists' Association Stanley Awards.
- 2008: Finalist, Comic Strip Artist of the Year at the Australian Cartoonists' Association Stanley Awards.
- 2008: Winner, Peoples' Choice Prize at the 'Behind the Lines' political cartooning exhibition at the National Gallery in Canberra.
- 2009: Finalist, Comic Strip Artist of the Year at the Australian Cartoonists' Association Stanley Awards.
- 2010: Finalist, Comic Strip Artist of the Year at the Australian Cartoonists' Association Stanley Awards.
- 2012: Finalist, Comic Strip Artist of the Year at the Australian Cartoonists' Association Stanley Awards.
- 2013: Finalist, Comic Strip Artist of the Year at the Australian Cartoonists' Association Stanley Awards.
- 2014: Finalist, Comic Strip Artist of the Year at the Australian Cartoonists' Association Stanley Awards.
- 2015: Finalist, Comic Strip Artist of the Year at the Australian Cartoonists' Association Stanley Awards.
- 2016: Finalist, Comic Strip Artist of the Year at the Australian Cartoonists' Association Stanley Awards.
- 2017: Finalist, Comic Strip Artist of the Year at the Australian Cartoonists' Association Stanley Awards.
- 2017: Finalist, Single Gag Cartoonist of the Year at the Australian Cartoonists' Association Stanley Awards.
- 2018: Finalist, Single Gag Cartoonist of the Year at the Australian Cartoonists' Association Stanley Awards.
- 2019: Finalist, Comic Strip Artist of the Year at the Australian Cartoonists' Association Stanley Awards.
- 2020: Finalist, Comic Strip Artist of the Year at the Australian Cartoonists' Association Stanley Awards.
- 2020: Finalist, Single Gag Cartoonist of the Year at the Australian Cartoonists' Association Stanley Awards.
- 2021: Finalist, Comic Strip Artist of the Year at the Australian Cartoonists' Association Stanley Awards.
- 2021: Finalist, Book Illustrator of the Year at the Australian Cartoonists' Association Stanley Awards.
- 2022: Winner, Open Category, 33rd Annual Rotary Cartoon Awards.
- 2023: Finalist, Single Gag Cartoonist of the Year at the Australian Cartoonists' Association Stanley Awards.
- 2024: Finalist, Newspaper/Magazine Illustrator of the Year at the National Cartoonists Society Reuben Awards.
- 2024: Finalist, Online Comics: Longform Cartoonist of the Year at the National Cartoonists Society Reuben Awards.
- 2026: Winner, Book Illustrator of the Year at the National Cartoonists Society Reuben Awards.
- 2026: Finalist, Book Illustrator of the Year at the Australian Cartoonists' Association Stanley Awards.
