= Charles Zwar =

Australian songwriter and composer

Charles Zwar (10 April 1911 (Note: In the Encyclopedia of the Musical Theatre, Stanley Green cites 1914 as Zwar's year of birth.) – 2 December 1989) was an Australian songwriter, composer, lyricist, pianist and music director who was largely associated with the British revue and musical comedy industries between the late-1930s and 1960s.

== Life and work ==
=== Early life ===
The youngest son of Mr and Mrs Charles Zwar of Broadford, Victoria (Australia), Charles Zwar (Jnr) was born on 10 April 1911. He was later educated in the Melbourne suburb of Williamstown, attending North Williamstown State Primary and Williamstown High School. During his childhood Zwar developed a passion for music, and is reported to have been a student of Mr G. W. McKeown. After completing his education at North Williamstown State Primary and Williamstown High he undertook a degree in Law and Arts at the University of Melbourne, where he was in residence at Trinity College from 1928 to 1932. He was frequently found at the piano in the student common room, making up topical songs and mixing the latest jazz tunes with classical music. Zwar was involved in student productions at the College and University as both a performer and music director. The earliest theatrical production he has been linked with was the 1933 revue Stude Prunes.

=== Career beginnings in Australia ===
1933 also saw Zwar make his first appearance on radio, being part of a 3AR programme of dance music that was interspersed with singing by Ella Riddell and comedy by Johnny Marks. Zwar's contributions saw him billed as a "novelty entertainer." His popularity with audiences saw him return to the airwaves several times over the next couple of months. His performances were not confined to the piano, however, with a Derby Week engagement at St Kilda seeing him billed as a singer.

Zwar's growing reputation also saw him invited to contribute additional lyrics for F. W. Thring's 1933 production of the T. Stuart Gurr and Varney Monk musical comedy Collits' Inn. Others involved in the creative aspects of the musical included George Wallace and Jock McLeod. The following year Zwar contributed most of the music and lyrics for another university revue, Swots Next (18 April) while also collaborating with J. C. Bancks (creator of comic strip Ginger Meggs) on the musical comedy, Blue Mountain Melody (1934). Produced by J. C. Williamsons, Zwar was given the opportunity to work closely with 'the Firm's' highly experienced music director, Andrew McGunn.

=== Move to the United Kingdom and later life ===
Zwar left Australia for Britain in 1936 on the same ship as children's author Isobel Ann Shead (1906–1985). They had met in Melbourne while Shead was working for the ABC 1933–1936, and later as presenter of a children's program on 3DB (Melbourne). In 1938, they married in Surrey, England. Both succeeded in establishing careers there, with Shead appointed to a series high-profile positions with the BBC, while Zwar carved out a career as a composer and musical director for musical comedies and revues that lasted more than three decades.

Zwar and Shead are believed to have separated in the early 1950s. In 1955 he remarried, his second wife being Diana Plunkett (1918–1992), a theatrical technician and manager at the Lyric Theatre Hammersmith. At the time of the marriage he was musical director of Sandy Wilson's musical The Buccaneer. The couple had one child, a daughter.

Zwar's longest and most successful collaboration was with writer/lyricist Alan Melville. He also wrote songs with Kenneth Leslie-Smith, Diana Morgan, Robert MacDermot (1910–1964) and Australian Lance Mulcahy. Although his professional career was almost exclusively in the United Kingdom, Zwar's music did make it to the US. He is included, for example in the credits for the 1960 Broadway revue, From A to Z (Plymouth Theatre). Premiering on 20 April, the show also included contributions from Woody Allen, Jerry Herman and Jay Thompson.

Zwar reconnected with the Australian theatre several times during the 1950s and 1960s, contributing material for such shows as Sweetest and Lowest: A Revue in Time (Minerva Theatre, Sydney; 5 December 1947); Metropolitan Merry-Go-Round (Metropolitan Theatre, Sydney; 12 February 1953); and the 1964 Phillip Theatre revue, Is Australia Really Necessary? (Syd; 3 Oct.).

Charles Zwar died on 2 December 1989 at Oxford, England.

== Music ==
Musical revues and musical comedies

- Stude Prunes (1933)
- Collits' Inn (1933)
- Swot Next (1934)
- Blue Mountain Melody (1934, with J. C. Bancks)
- Swinging the Gate (1940)
- Sky High (1942)
- Sweeter and Lower (1943, with Alan Melville)
- Sweetest and Lowest (1946)
- A La Carte (1947, with Alan Melville)
- One, Two Three (1947, with Alan Melville)
- The Lyric Revue (1951)
- Bet Your Life (1952, with Kenneth Leslie-Smith)
- Penny Plain (1952)
- At the Lyric (1953)
- John Murray Anderson's Almanac (1953)
- Metropolitan Merry-Go-round (1953, with Lance Mulcahy and Alan Melville)
- Marigold (1959, with Alan Melville)
- ...And Another Thing (1960)
- From A to Z (1960)
- Queen's Revue (1961)
- Out on a Limb (1961)
- All Square (1963)
- Is Australia Really Necessary? (1964)
- Hello Watford Goodbye (1965)
- The Station Master's Daughter (1968, with Frank Harvey)

NB: This list, sourced from the Australian Variety Theatre Archive, is incomplete.

Film scores

- Hullo, Fame! (1940, documentary)
- The Australian Army at War (1945, documentary)
- Eight Hundred Mile Voyage (1964, documentary)
- Before the Fringe (1967, television comedy series)
