= Tristan Bancks =

Australian children's and teen's author

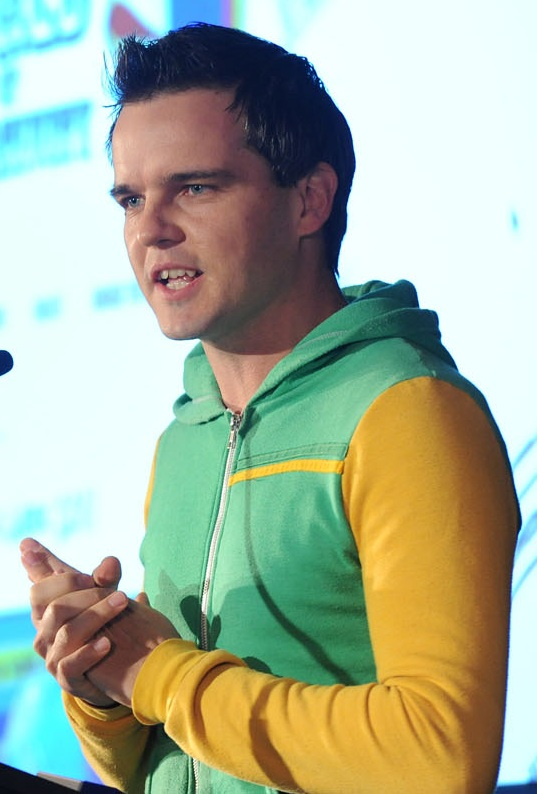
- Tristan Bancks at the Melbourne Writers Festival 2011
- Born: 21 December 1974 (age 51); Sydney, Australia
- Citizenship: Australian
- Occupations: Writer, Actor, Presenter
- Partner: Amber Melody
- Relatives: Jimmy Bancks (great uncle)
- Writing career
- Genre: Children's literature
- Notable awards: prime ministers literary awards, Queensland literary awards:

Tristan Bancks (21 December 1974) is an Australian children's and teen's author, with a background in filmmaking, presenting and acting. As an actor, he is known for his role as Tug O'Neale on Home and Away between 1992 and 1994.

== Biography ==
Bancks trained at Sydney's Q Theatre before landing a series regular role on Home and Away with his role being Tug O'Neale. After leaving Home and Away, he spent four years in London writing, researching and presenting television for ITV, BBC, Channel Four and Cable. He presented shows like Don't Try This at Home, Sussed, the second and third series of CITV's It's A Mystery and The Travel Channel.

In 1999, Tristan left London to return to Australia to appear in Ivan Sen's short drama Dust as well as Beneath Clouds and Remote Area Nurse. Since his return, Tristan has made a number of short films as writer and director, including adaptations of two award-winning stories – Sarah Armstrong's The Long Wet and John Campbell's The New Boots. Another film, Soar, screened at the London Film Festival, Clermont-Ferrand and Melbourne International Film Festival.

His latest short film, Every Day at School, was funded by SBS and Film Australia for their Change the World in Five Minutes campaign. It aims to inspire primary school classes all over the country to spend the first five minutes of every day changing the world in some small way.

For the past few years, he has been writing full-time. This include his 2009 release of Mac Slater Coolhunter 2: I Heart NY, which is the follow-up to The Rules of Cool. His other 2009 releases are the Nitboy books – Bug Out and Lift Off. His first Young Adult novel, It's Yr Life, co-written by former Home and Away actress and author Tempany Deckert, was released in June 2009. Tristan has also written eight short novels in Macmillan's Kids Inc. series, about kids setting up their own businesses and ventures.

In 2004, Bancks won at the Flickerfest International Short Film Festival for his direction in Soar.

Bancks was shortlisted for the Children's Book Award at the Queensland Literary Awards for Detention. He was shortlisted for the Young Adult Indie Award in 2023 for Cop & Robber.

He won the Young Australian Best Book Award for Fiction for Years 7–9 for Scar Town.

== Personal life ==
Bancks's great-great uncle, Jimmy Bancks, was the original creator of the Ginger Meggs comic in 1921; Tristan is the co-author of the 100th anniversary book edition of Ginger Meggs.

Bancks's sister, Kerryn Johnston, was previously a newsreader for WIN Television in Wollongong. He is married with two sons.

== Television ==
- Remote Area Nurse (2006) as Grub
- Beneath Clouds (2002) as Abduction Passenger
- Dust (1999/2000) as Mick
- It's a Mystery (1997/1999) as himself
- Home and Away (1992–1994) as Tug O'Neale

== Books ==
- Mac Slater Coolhunter 1: The Rules of Cool (2008)
- Mac Slater Coolhunter 2: I Heart NY (2009)
- Nitboy: Lift Off (2009)
- Nitboy: Bug Out (2009)
- It's Yr Life (with Tempany Deckert) (2009)
- My Life and Other Stuff I Made Up (2011)
- Galactic Adventures: First Kids in Space (2011)
- My Life and Other Stuff That Went Wrong (2014)
- Two Wolves (2014)
- My Life and Other Massive Mistakes (2015)
- On The Run (2015)
- My Life and Other Exploding Chickens (2016)
- The Fall (2017)
- My Life and Other Weaponized Muffins (2017)
- My Life and Other Failed Experiments (2018)
- Detention (2019)
- Ginger Meggs (with Jason Chatfield) (2021)
- Cop & Robber (2022)
- Scar Town (2023)
- Raised By Wolves (2026)
