= Robin Ordell =

Australian actor (1920–1945)

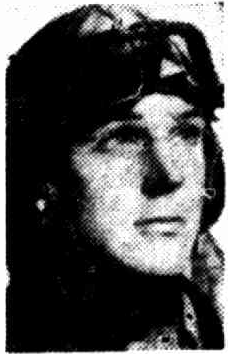
- Ordell in military uniform
- Born: 16 June 1920; Sydney, New South Wales, Australia
- Died: 3 February 1945 (aged 24); Europe
- Other name: Pop
- Occupation: Actor

Robin "Pop" Ordell DFC (16 June 1920 – 3 February 1945) was an Australian actor and radio announcer. He acted as a child in his father Tal's film The Kid Stakes, later working with the radio station 2GB as a teenager and adult. He was killed in the Second World War.

== Biography ==
=== Early life and acting career ===
Ordell was born in Sydney on 16 June 1920 to nurse Ethel Phillips and actor Tal Ordell. Tal had acted for around two decades before his son's birth.

In January 1927, aged six, Ordell was cast in his father's film The Kid Stakes as the main character, Fatty Finn. The Sunday Times described him as a "wistful looking youngster, with a direct heart appeal, and an uncanny instinct for his work. His sense of comedy and face play of varying emotions are delightful."

In the mid-1930s, Ordell began acting in radio plays for 2GB. He appeared as Peter Heywood in The Mutiny of the Bounty (1934) and as the boy in Murder at 2FC (1935). He appeared in other serials throughout the late 1930s like Raising a Family.

=== Radio announcing career ===
After graduating from Sydney Grammar School in 1937, Ordell joined 2GB as a junior radio announcer. In 1939, (Note: A May 1939 article from The Australian Women's Weekly says that Ordell assumed the position "a few weeks ago", while The Cumberland Argus and Fruitgrowers' Advocate wrote in June 1940 that Ordell had become a full-time radio announcer "nearly 18 months ago", indicating a date of around January 1939.) when Dick Fair was transferred from the early morning radio session (between 6:00 and 8:45 a.m.) to the evening programme, Ordell filled his place, becoming the youngest radio announcer in Australia at the time.

In June 1940, Ordell created The Youth Show, a programme on 2GB focusing on radio stars below the age of 21. It was broadcast throughout Australia.

=== Military service ===
In late 1941, Ordell underwent medical examinations and was accepted by the Royal Australian Air Force to serve as an airman in the Second World War. The Cumberland Argus and Fruitgrowers' Advocate explained that "always a flying fanatic, Robin has realised his boyhood ambitions, and holds high hopes of becoming a fighter pilot." On 25 April 1942, he enlisted in Woolloomooloo; Jack Davey replaced him as morning announcer on 2GB. During his service, Ordell trained as a pilot in Canada under the Empire Air Training Scheme and performed for other servicemen during posting in London. He was assigned to No. 100 Squadron RAF, serving as an Avro Lancaster bomber pilot.

On 3 February 1945, Ordell, a flight lieutenant, engaged in a bombing raid against industrial plants in Germany's Ruhr region. During the raid, he and five other crew members were killed in action when their plane was shot down. The only survivor, tail gunner J. Harper, was wounded and taken prisoner. Initially reported missing in action, Ordell's body was recovered and buried in Venraij before being interred in Mierlo War Cemetery after the war. In April 1946, he was posthumously awarded the Distinguished Flying Cross for "displaying the utmost fortitude, courage and devotion to duty."
