= Sunburnt Space Company =

Australian aerospace start-up

Sunburnt Space Co
- Type: Proprietary limited company
- Industry: Aerospace; suborbital launch services; microgravity payload services
- Founded: 11 November 2024; 21 months ago
- Founders: Brad Younger; Robin Biskupic; Sam Cain
- Headquarters: Brookvale, New South Wales, Australia
- Key people: Brad Younger, co-founder and CEO; Robin Biskupic, co-founder and chief engineer; Sam Cain, co-founder and program director

Sunburnt Space Co Pty Ltd is an Australian aerospace start-up based in Brookvale, New South Wales. The company is developing suborbital rockets and recoverable payload services for microgravity research, hardware qualification and technology demonstration flights. It is registered in Australia as SUNBURNT SPACE CO PTY LTD, an Australian private company with ABN 45 682 214 320 and ACN 682 214 320, active from 11 November 2024.The company has publicly described its initial business as providing frequent suborbital access to space-like conditions from White Cliffs, New South Wales, with customer payloads recovered after flight. Publicly named vehicles include Mini Meggs, Ginger Meggs and Meggs 11, with Mini Meggs described as the company's near-term suborbital vehicle and later vehicles described by the company as part of a progression toward higher-altitude and orbital services.

== History ==
Sunburnt Space Co was registered as an Australian private company on 11 November 2024. Local reporting by the Northern Beaches Advocate stated that the company was founded in November 2024 and was operating from a factory on Winbourne Road in Brookvale, New South Wales. The same report identified Brad Younger as founder and chief executive officer, and described the company as seeking to build a business around launching rockets and, eventually, commercial payloads.A Northern Beaches Council business profile described Younger as a rocketry enthusiast who was developing Sunburnt Space Co from Brookvale and aiming to build Australian rockets, beginning with Meggs Jr, an early prototype intended to reach the Kármán line. The company's own website lists Brad Younger as co-founder and CEO, Robin Biskupic as co-founder and chief engineer, and Sam Cain as co-founder and program director.In July 2025, company-distributed press material stated that Sunburnt Space Co would undertake its first test rockets from a site in regional New South Wales in partnership with Endeavour Aerospace at White Cliffs. In August 2025, the company reported two test firings of an aluminium rocket engine, including a short burn and a later failed test, which it said informed subsequent engine development.

In September 2025, the company issued a press release announcing a MiniMeggs test launch from White Cliffs, saying the flight had validated avionics, parachute and recovery systems and that a liquid-fuel vehicle called Mini Insanity was planned as a next milestone. In December 2025, the company published a separate account stating that it had launched and recovered its first rocket in October 2025 at White Cliffs, describing the flight as a validation of recovery, payload integration and site operations.

== Vehicles ==
=== Mini Meggs ===
Mini Meggs is the company's publicly identified near-term suborbital vehicle. In February 2026, Space Connect reported that Sunburnt Space's planned March 2026 campaign would use Mini Meggs, described as a 6 in (15 cm), two-stage suborbital rocket powered by an ethanol/nitrous oxide bipropellant engine. The same article described Mini Meggs as a reusable platform with later 2026 flights planned to reach up to 80 km (50 mi).The company's own materials describe Mini Meggs as the first commercial suborbital service vehicle in a larger vehicle family, intended to support monthly launch windows, 80 km and 120 km missions, customer cadence and flight heritage.

=== Ginger Meggs and Meggs 11 ===
Sunburnt Space Co's website and investor materials identify Ginger Meggs as a planned larger suborbital or high-suborbital vehicle and Meggs 11 as a planned orbital vehicle. In investor materials, the company described Ginger Meggs as planned from Q3 2028 and Meggs 11 as an orbital vehicle from 2030.

=== Meggs Jr ===
Earlier public material referred to Meggs Jr as a prototype aimed at breaking the Kármán line. A September 2025 company press release described Mini Insanity as a planned liquid-fuel rocket intended to demonstrate the company's liquid propulsion system at higher altitude. Later public-facing company materials emphasised Mini Meggs, Ginger Meggs and Meggs 11 as the primary named vehicle family.

== Launch sites and activity ==
Sunburnt Space Co has associated its early launch activity with White Cliffs, New South Wales, and with Endeavour Aerospace as a launch-site and operations partner. Aviation State Engagement Forum records show proposed temporary restricted airspace connected with Endeavour Aerospace and Sunburnt Space Co activity near Caradoc Station, approximately 12 nautical miles north-north-east of White Cliffs.An AvSEF consultation for November 2025 described a proposed sounding rocket launch with Sunburnt Space Co to 90,700 ft (27,600 m) near White Cliffs, with a main intended date of 3 November 2025 and later dates as weather contingencies.

In February 2026, Space Connect reported that Sunburnt Space had announced a 30 March to 3 April 2026 launch window for three Mini Meggs suborbital launches from White Cliffs. The article said the campaign would include one test flight and two customer payload missions, target altitudes of about 25 km (16 mi), and customer payloads from Metakosmos and Orbit2Orbit. An AvSEF consultation for the same period described proposed sounding rocket launches with Sunburnt Space Co from Caradoc Station to 87,000 ft (27,000 m), with launches intended on 30 March, 31 March and 1 April 2026 and later dates as weather contingencies.Subsequent AvSEF advisories recorded changes to the planned 2026 launch window, first from 30 March–3 April to 18–22 May 2026, and then from 18–22 May to 15–19 June 2026. A later AvSEF consultation opened in June 2026 proposed another rocket launch near White Cliffs on 28–30 September 2026, again with Endeavour Aerospace as the proponent.

== See also ==
- Sounding rocket
- Micro-g environment
