= The Kid Stakes =

1927 film

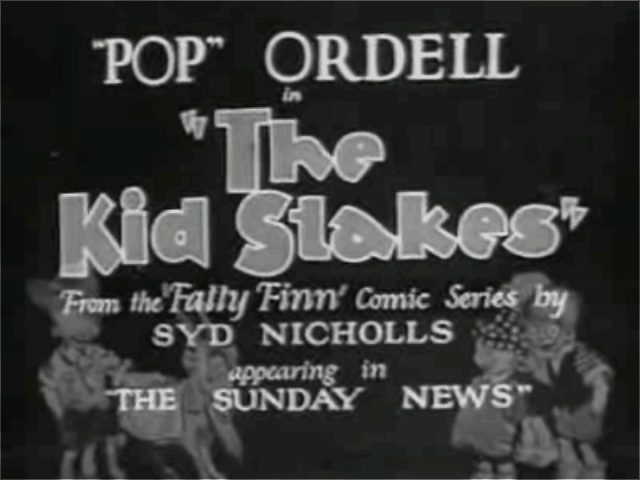
- The Kid Stakes title screen.
- Directed by: Tal Ordell
- Written by: Tal Ordell
- Based on: comic strip characters created by Syd Nicholls
- Produced by: Tal Ordell; Virgil Coyle
- Starring: Robin 'Pop' Ordell; Eileen Alexander; Frank Boyd; Leonard Durell; Syd Nicholls; Tad Ordell
- Cinematography: Arthur Higgins
- Production company: Ordell-Coyle Productions
- Release date: 9 June 1927
- Running time: 76 minutes
- Country: Australia
- Language: English
- Budget: £4,000

The Kid Stakes is a 1927 Australian silent comedy film written and directed by Tal Ordell.

The screenplay is based on characters created by Syd Nicholls in his comic strip, Fatty Finn.

== Plot summary ==
Fatty Finn is the six-year-old leader of a gang of kids in Woolloomooloo. They enter Fatty's pet goat Hector in the annual goat derby, but his rival Bruiser Murphy lets the goat loose before the race. After a series of adventures, Fatty finds the runaway goat and persuades a friendly aviator to fly him to the race-track in time for the main event.

== Cast ==
- Robin 'Pop' Ordell as Fatty Finn
- Charles Roberts as Tiny King
- Eileen Alexander as Madeline Twirt
- Ray Salmon as Jimmy Kelly
- Leonard Durell as Constable Claffey
- Frank Boyd as Bruiser Murphy
- Billy Ireland as Seasy
- Eileen Alexander as Madeline Twirt
- Jimmy Taylor as Horatio John Wart
- Tad Ordell as Radio race-caller
- Syd Nicholls as self
- David Nettheim as Baby in Pram

== Production ==
The majority of the shooting locations for The Kid Stakes were in Woolloomooloo and Potts Point in Sydney.

The film's finale, the goat race, however was filmed in Rockhampton, Queensland, because goat racing was illegal in New South Wales.

The role of Fatty Finn was played by Tal Ordell's six-year-old son Robin, known as 'Pop' Ordell.

== Reception ==
The film premiered at the Wintergarden Theatre in Brisbane on 9 June 1927. The now defunct weekly magazine, Pix, in its review states "Kid Stakes brings back the Sydney of the 1920s. They were all on parade; the ragged urchins, the brawling and the free-fisted characters of the waterfront."

Ordell sold the remake rights to England and had discussions to make a talking version in 1930. However this did not eventuate and Ordell never directed another feature.

Robin Ordell went on to become a star of Sydney radio in the 1930s. He then joined the Royal Australian Air Force and won a Distinguished Flying Cross (DFC). He was killed over the Netherlands in 1945 at about the age of 24.

The movie was thought lost until rediscovered in 1952. It was re-released two years later.

The Kid Stakes was remade as Fatty Finn in 1980.

== See also ==
- Cinema of Australia
- Ginger Meggs
