= Fatty Finn (film) =

- Directed by: Maurice Murphy
- Written by: Bob Ellis
- Produced by: Brian Rosen
- Starring: Ben Oxenbould; Rebecca Rigg; Jeremy Larsson; Martin Lewis
- Music by: Grahame Bond; Rory O'Donoghue
- Production companies: Childrens Film Corporation; Australian Film Commission; Finn Productions
- Distributed by: Hoyts
- Release date: 18 December 1980
- Running time: 91 minutes
- Country: Australia
- Language: English
- Budget: $350,000
- Box office: $1.064 million (Australia)

Fatty Finn is a 1980 Australian film, directed by Maurice Murphy and starring Ben Oxenbould with Rebecca Rigg. It is based on the 1930s cartoon-strip character, Fatty Finn, created by Syd Nicholls and is loosely based on the 1927 silent film, The Kid Stakes.

== Plot ==
Set in inner-city Woolloomooloo in Sydney, New South Wales in 1930, the neighbourhood nice guys are led by Fatty (real name Hubert Finn), an ambitious ten-year-old with an eye for making a quid. From shady frog jumping contests to a fixed goat race, Fatty uses his enterprise to raise enough money to buy a crystal set (radio without a separate power supply) that is worth seventeen shillings & sixpence (17/6), more than his Dad is able to save up in a year. Bruiser Murphy the bully and his gang try to stop him. Fatty uses his brains against his enemies' brawn to eventually triumph.

== Cast ==
- Ben Oxenbould as Hubert 'Fatty' Finn
- Rebecca Rigg as Tilly
- Jeremy Larsson as Headlights
- Martin Lewis as Skeet
- Hugo Grieve as Seasy
- Sandy Leask as Lolly Legs
- Greg Kelly as Bruiser Murphy
- Christopher Norton as Snootle
- Bert Newton as John Finn
- Noni Hazlehurst as Myrtle Finn
- Gerard Kennedy as Tiger Murphy
- Su Cruickshank as Mrs Murphy
- Lorraine Bayly as Maggie McGrath
- Bill Young as Officer Claffey
- Ross Higgins as Radio Announcer
- Peter Rowley as Chauffeur
- Frank Wilson as Lord Mayor
- Henri Szeps as Mr Zilch
- Peter Carroll as Teacher

== Production ==
Screenwriter Bob Ellis says it was his idea to make the film. He complained about interference from the film's producers, John Sexton and Yoram Gross, claiming Sexton in particular wanted a lot of changes, but changed his mind after David Puttnam praised Ellis's original draft. He later said of the film that "all the performances are dreadful, the conspicuous exception being Bert Newton's."

Of the $350,000 budget, $120,000 came from the Australian Film Commission.

The movie was set in Woolloomooloo but the area had changed a lot since then so was shot in and around Glebe. Filming took place in January and February 1980.

== Reception ==
=== Box office ===
Fatty Finn grossed $1.064 million at the box office in Australia.

=== Awards ===
The film was nominated for seven Australian Film Institute Awards in 1981 winning in the categories of 'Best Achievement in Costume Design' and 'Best Original Music Score'.
