= Blue Mountain Melody =

- Music: Charles Zwar
- Lyrics: Charles Zwar
- Book: Jimmy Bancks
- Productions: 1934 Sydney & Melbourne

Blue Mountain Melody (also seen as The Blue Mountains Melody) is a 1934 Australian musical comedy. The musical is set in and around Sydney, Australia; with scenes in the Blue Mountains, New South Wales, Palm Beach, New South Wales, and Kings Cross, New South Wales. It was a rare local musical produced by J. C. Williamson Ltd. The firm commissioned it following the success of Collits' Inn.

Blue Mountain Melody's original production featuring Madge Elliott and Cyril Ritchard opened at the Theatre Royal in Sydney in September 1934. The production moved to Melbourne at His Majesty's Theatre in November 1934.

Plans were announced to make a movie of it using the stage cast under the direction of Frederick Blackman. However the musical was not a notable success and Williamson did not produce another local original musical until The Sentimental Bloke in the early 1960s.

== Songs ==
- "Blue Mountain Melody"
- "I Can See a Picture"
- "Shadows"
- "Let's Relax"
- "Send Me a Telegram"
- "Palm Beach Girl"
- "Cooee"
- "How I Love You"
- "I'd Like to Be a Statue in the Park"
