= Virginia Vestoff =

American actress (1939–1982)

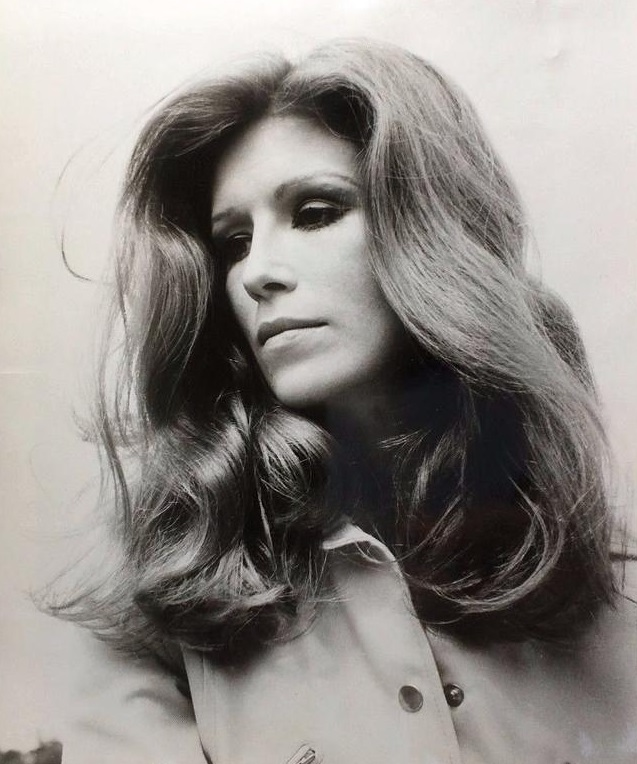
- Vestoff in 1972
- Born: December 9, 1939; New York City, U.S.
- Died: May 2, 1982 (aged 42); New York City, U.S.
- Occupations: Actress, singer
- Years active: 1959–1981
- Spouse: Marty Lefkoe (m. 1966; div. 1975)

Virginia Vestoff (December 9, 1939 – May 2, 1982) was an American actress and singer who appeared in film, television and on the stage. A native of New York City, she made her professional debut at the North Jersey Playhouse in 1958. She made her Broadway debut two years later in the musical revue From A to Z and performed frequently in both Broadway and Off-Broadway production in Manhattan during the 1960s and 1970s. In 1969 she was nominated for a Tony Award for her performance as Abigail Adams in the original production of the musical 1776; a part she later reprised in the 1972 film adaption of that show. On television she was a main cast member of several daytime dramas, including the roles of Dr. Althea Davis in The Doctors (1969-1970) and Samantha Drew Collins in Dark Shadows (1970-1971). She also portrayed Mrs. Frimple in the first season of PBS's 3-2-1 Contact (1980). She died from cancer in 1982 at the age of 42.

== Early life ==
The daughter of Valodja "Val" Vestoff (also given as Valedia Vestoff) and Peggy Foster Vestoff, Virginia L. Vestoff was born on December 9, 1939 in Manhattan. Her father was a Russian-born dancer who immigrated to the United States in order to tour in the Orpheum Circuit of vaudeville fame. Her mother was also a dancer and was born in Michigan. Composer Stephen Foster was her great-great uncle on her mother's side of the family. Her father was a well known dancer and dance teacher who was a featured performer in the original Broadway production of Cole Porter's Anything Goes. Her mother, under her stage name Peggy Vestoff, was also a dancer in that Broadway show.

Vestoff lived in Hell's Kitchen with her parents during her early childhood. Her father died in September 1947 a few months before her eighth birthday. Her mother died in March 1949 when she was nine years old. After the death of her parents, she was raised by her cousin Flora. She coped with the loss by acting, and took third prize on The Ted Mack Amateur Hour. At the age of 10 she performed in her first professional production as a member of the children's chorus with the New York City Opera.

While living with relatives, Vestoff attended the New York High School for the Performing Arts. At 15, she decided to move out and manage life on her own by attending Washington Irving High School and moonlighting as a salesgirl at a department store. However, Vestoff quit school early to tour with a dance company. The failure to graduate remained a personal regret to Vestoff throughout her life, which she countered with a thirst to self-educate, becoming an extensive reader.

== Early professional career ==
In the summer of 1958 Vestoff portrayed Nancy in North Jersey Playhouse's production of The Boy Friend; a role she also portrayed at the Corning Summer Theatre in Corning, New York. In the 1958-1959 season she starred as The Princess in North Shore Civic Music's touring production of Bambi Linn and Rod Alexander's revue Dance Jubilee: From Minstrel Days to Swing Time. She appeared in performances of this revue at the University of Massachusetts, the Lynn Memorial City Hall and Auditorium, Bay City Central High School in Michigan, Houston Music Hall in Texas, the Orpheum Theatre in Sioux City, Iowa, Jackson Municipal Auditorium in Mississippi, the War Memorial Auditorium in Nashville, the Municipal Auditorium in New Orleans, the Lyric Theatre in Allentown, PA, the Eastman Theatre in New York, and the FTL War Memorial in Florida.

In May 1959 Vestoff performed at the Off-Broadway Renata Theatre in Greenwich Village in the revue Fallout. She spent the summer of that year at the Tamiment resort performing with Dorothy Loudon and Bob Dishy in Fred Ebb's The Happy Medium (also known as Tiger, Tiger). In 1960 she starred in The Crystal Heart, a new musical by playwright William Archibald and composer Baldwin Bergersen at the East 74th Street Theater with Mildred Dunnock as her co-star. On March 26, 1960 she performed in the world premiere of the revue From A to Z at the Shubert Theatre in New Haven, Connecticut; a work directed by Christopher Hewett. The show's creative team included Woody Allen as one of its writers, and included music by multiple composers, among them Jerry Herman and Fred Ebb. After leaving New Haven it ran at the Forrest Theatre in Philadelphia prior to transferring to Broadway. It briefly ran at the Plymouth Theatre and marked Vestoff's Broadway debut.

In the summer of 1960 Vestoff portrayed May in Redhead at the Cape Cod Melody Tent with Patti Karr in the title role. On television she was interviewed by Mike Wallace in August 1961 on PM East/PM West for her work as a standby for the title role in the 1961 Broadway production of Irma La Douce; also performing excerpts from the show on that program. She ultimately played the part of Irma for a five week period during that show's Broadway run. When that production toured nationally in 1962 it starred Taina Elg as Irma La Douce with Vestoff as her standby. Vestoff notably performed the role at the National Theatre in Washington, D.C. on the night that it was attended by president John F. Kennedy and first lady Jacqueline Kennedy in January 1962 while Elg was recuperating from an illness. In September 1962 she starred in the revue Standing Room Only in St. Louis with Imogene Coca.

In 1963 Vestoff starred in the revues Medium Rare and Put It In Writing at the Happy Medium Theatre in Chicago. In 1964 she portrayed Guenevere in Camelot at Music Circus in New Jersey with Jack Washburn as Lancelot, and appeared Off-Broadway in Treva Silverman's And in This Corner at Upstairs at the Downstairs. On December 28, 1964 she created the role of Daisy Jenkins in the premiere of Jerome Coopersmith, Marian Grudeff and Raymond Jessel's musical Baker Street at the Shubert Theatre in Boston. She remained with the production when it transferred to the Broadway Theatre in New York in February 1965. She was also the understudy for the lead role of Irene Adler in Baker Street, and occasionally performed the role role while Inga Swenson was not able to perform.

Shortly before performing in Baker Street, Vestoff met her future husband, writer Morty Lefkoe, in late 1964, and married him just five months later in 1965. Lefkoe is the president and founder of the Lefkoe Institute and creator of the Lefkoe Method, a psychological process. They divorced in 1975.

== Later professional career ==
In 1965-1966 Vestoff starred opposite Bobby Short in a revue of Cole Porter's music, Ben Bagley's New Cole Porter Revue, Off-Broadway at the Square East Theatre in Greenwich Village. In June 1966 she reprised the role of Irma La Douce at the Green Hills Theatre in Pennsylvania. In 1966-1967 she appeared Off-Broadway at the Jan Hus Playhouse as the lead actress ("The Lady") in John Clifton's new musical Man with a Load of Mischief. She also starred in the 1967 television episode "We Interrupt This Season" as part of the NBC Experiment in Television program.

In 1968 Vestoff played Olivia in Love and Let Love, a new musical adaptation of Shakespeare's Twelfth Night by composer Stanley Jay Gelber, at the Sheridan Square Playhouse. That same year she was Constance Towers's understudy for the role of Anna in the New York City Center revival of The King and I, and performed in a workshop of Arthur Rubinte's Booth is Back in Town at Lincoln Center. In the summer of 1968 he performed the role of Madame Goodheart in the premiere of Howard Da Silva's After You, Mr. Hyde at the Goodspeed Opera House; also appearing at that theatre in the lead part of Majorie Taylor in Rodgers and Hammerstein's Allegro.

Vestoff's most famous stage role was that of Abigail Adams in the musical 1776; a role which she first performed in that work's world premiere at the National Theatre in Washington D.C. in February 1969. She played this role in the original Broadway cast at the 46th St Theatre, and in a special presentation of the musical at the White House for president Richard Nixon. The part garnered her a nomination for the Tony Award for Best Featured Actress in a Musical at the 23rd Tony Awards in 1969. She reprised this part in the 1972 film adaptation of that musical. While playing Abigail Adams on Broadway she joined the main cast of the daytime soap opera The Doctors as Dr. Althea Davis; a role previously played by Elizabeth Hubbard. She played this role from October 20, 1969 to June 20, 1970. When Vestoff left due to her unhappiness with the role, Hubbard returned to the role on October 1, 1970.

In 1970-1971 Vestoff was a main cast member of Dark Shadows in the role of Samantha Drew Collins. She portrayed the part of Emily in the 1971 film Such Good Friends directed by Otto Preminger. In 1972 she portrayed Eliza Doolittle in My Fair Lady at the Chateau de Ville Dinner Theatre in Massachusetts with Noel Harrison as Henry Higgins. On November 28, 1972 she and Raul Julia were the leads in the premiere of the musical Via Galactica which was performed for the grand opening of the newly built Uris Theatre on Broadway. She portrayed the role of Omaha, the girlfriend of Julia's character Gabriel Finn, in this production.

Vestoff subsequently appeared in the Broadway productions of Ogden Nash's Nash at Nine (1973), Henrik Ibsen's A Doll's House (1975, as Nora), and Richard Peaslee's Boccaccio (1975, as Giletta and the Abbess). In 1974 she portrayed both Amanda Prynne in Private Lives and Jenny in The Threepenny Opera at the Williamstown Theatre Festival. Off-Broadway she portrayed Jane in The Shortchanged Review (1976). She made several appearances at Joseph Papp's The Public Theater; including Molière's The Misanthrope (1977, as Celimene) and E. L. Doctorow's Drinks Before Dinner (1978).

In 1977 Vestoff starred as Helen in the two part episode "Kojak's Day" in season 4 of Kojak, and portrayed the part of Renee Carmody in the television film The Quinns. In 1978 she succeeded Gretchen Cryer as Heather Jones in the original Off-Broadway production of I'm Getting My Act Together and Taking It on the Road. That same year she portrayed Clarice Sloan in Robert Altman's film A Wedding. In 1979 she returned to Broadway as Daisy in Stewart Parker's Spokesong at the Circle in the Square Theatre; performing opposite John Lithgow as her character's boyfriend. In 1980 she portrayed the recurring role of Mrs. Frimple on PBS's 3-2-1 Contact, and appeared as Laurie Elliot in the NBC sitcom pilot Alone at Last. During her career she appeared in numerous television commercials, including Sure Deodorant, Geritol, Hamburger Helper, Sardo Bath Beads, and Bradlees.

== Death ==
Vestoff died in New York City on May 2, 1982, at the age of 42. The cause was cancer.

== Filmography ==
Year	Title	Role	Notes
1971	Such Good Friends	Emily Lapham	
1972	1776	Abigail Adams	
1978	A Wedding	Clarice Sloan	
