= Williamstown High School (Victoria) =

Coordinates: 37°51′44″S 144°53′41″E

- Williamstown, Victoria; Australia

Information
- Type: Public
- Motto: Hold Fast
- Established: October 1914
- Principal: Gino Catalano
- Years: 7–12 (VCE+VCAL)
- Enrollment: 1543
- Houses: Greenwich; Phillip; Hobson; Gellibrand
- Colours: Burgundy, yellow, black & blue
- Website: willihigh.vic.edu.au/index.php/

Williamstown High School is a public co-educational secondary school located in the Melbourne suburb of Williamstown. It is a multi-campus school with both campuses located within walking distance. Its two campuses, known as the Bayview Street and Pasco Street campuses, are within walking distance. It was one of Melbourne's first public secondary schools, founded in 1914.

== Campuses ==
=== Bayview Street Campus ===
Bayview St is the junior campus which houses students Years 7–9. It caters for approximately 750 students and employs around 75 staff members. The Bayview Street Campus was formerly the Point Gellibrand Girls School.

==== Sustainability ====
The School was redeveloped in 2005 to become a model for environmental education. The campus is the first high school in Victoria to receive a 5 Green Star rating by Green Building Council of Australia and has won several awards for its sustainable and clever design. While the schools' design was built with sustainability as its main factor, the curriculum to students is also heavily focused on the environment. The Jawbone marine sanctuary is located behind the school and plays a key role in the Marine education centre located in the school. The marine centre is staffed by a marine biologist and features 9 habitat displays, its role is to promote awareness to the delicate marine ecosystem. Some environmental features of the school include 57 solar panels, rainwater collection system for flushing toilets and irrigation, vegetable gardens, composting facilities, wetland area, built using plantation and recycled materials and a unique design layout for natural cooling/heating without the use of electricity.

=== Pasco Street Campus ===
The Pasco Campus is a historic site that provides education to Year 10 and VCE students. The Campus was built in 1875 and consists of buildings from different decades. The oldest building dates from 1867.

The Campus is split into the following blocks:

- S Block (Science Labs)
- A Block (Math and media classrooms, Administration office)
- L Block (Library, normal classrooms, computer labs, staff offices)
- P Block/Portables (Classrooms that range from French, English, History etc.)
- Q Block/Quadrangle (technology and normal classrooms, staff offices)

The students at Pasco are given many opportunities for their learning and their future. This includes:

- A range of VCE units and accelerated university studies
- Vocational Education and Training in Schools – (VETiS)
- Victorian Certificate of Applied Learning (VCAL) which is a school-based apprenticeship and an alternative pathway to VCE.

Facilities at Pasco include:

- Two drama and art performance areas: Soul City and the Centenary Theatre
- Photography Darkroom
- Fully equipped and modern science labs
- Recording studio and music rooms
- Computer labs
- Gym and basketball courts
- Wood technology room
- Year 12 Study centre

== Notable alumni ==
Notable individuals who studied at the school include:

- Aretha Brown, Indigenous youth activist
- Brian Grieve, botanist
- Ross A. Hull, radio engineer
- Alan Rawlinson, airman and fighter ace
- Charles Zwar, songwriter and musical director
- Callan Ward, Australian rules footballer
- Morgan Mitchell, runner
- Rachel Jarry, basketballer
- Molly Jovic, Netballer

== Notable staff ==
- George Furner Langley

== Centenary Theatre ==
In the 2015–16 School Improvement fund (state budget), $10 million was allocated to the school by the Victorian Government. The budget allocated $500,000 for the delivery of the school's Centenary Theatre project. Along with the fund from the (labor) government the school has been raising funds through community donations and fund-raising since 2012. It is estimated the school community to have raised $500,000 since August 2012. In 2013 and 2014 all new year 7 students received a reusable money donation box to collect loose change to help build the theatre. These red and blue boxes resulted in a competition for students with the chance to win a prize for the heaviest box. Building of the theatre commenced in 2015 and the project was completed and opened at the end of May 2017, in time for the yearly school production. The opening was held by Minister Noonan, the local MLA, School Council President Andrew Egan, and Principal Gino Catalano. The event was accompanied by entertainment by school students. The theatre or 'performing arts centre' seats 300 people, includes a dance studio and art gallery. The theatre is fully equipped with lighting, bathroom and kitchen facilities, full backstage rooms, curtains and more.

== Filming Venue ==
=== Your're Skitting Me (2012–2016) ===
The Australian TV series, 'You're Skitting Me' was filmed at Williamstown High School. The uniform worn by students features the school's motto 'Hold Fast' and the logo.

=== Upper Middle Bogan (2013–2016) ===
The Australian TV series, 'Upper Middle Bogan' featured Williamstown High School in the episode 'Sticking to Your Principals'. The school was portrayed as the school of 'Shaun Van Winkle'. The episode was filmed at the school's Bayview Campus.
