= Ross A. Hull =

Ross Amos Hull (c. 1902 – 14 September 1938) was an Australian–American radio engineer and experimenter who was for a time editor of the Australian Wireless Weekly and the ARRL magazine QST.

== Early life ==
Ross Hull was born in St Arnaud, Victoria, a son of (Presbyterian) Rev. Henry Tremlett Hull (1858 – 1 January 1933) and his wife Mabel Constance Josephine Hull (née Amos) (c. 1866 – 13 July 1931), and was educated at Williamstown High School and Ballarat College.

== Career ==
He trained as an architect, but had a keen interest in the rapidly developing field of wireless communication. He took a leading part in experiments which demonstrated the value of shorter wavelengths for commercial communication. He was first in Australia to relay (receive and rebroadcast) an overseas wireless programme, through 3LO shortly after it was opened. He was vice president of the Victorian Division of the Wireless Institute of Australia in 1923.

In 1925 Hull abandoned architecture and began practising in Sydney as a consulting radio engineer. He was elected Federal Secretary of the Wireless Institute and the Australian Radio Relay League. He was a key figure in ground-breaking communication experiments between the U.S. and Australia. In 1927 he went to the United States, to work with the headquarters staff of the American Radio Relay League on the production of the league's magazine QST, then director of the ARRL Experimental Laboratory.

Hull returned to Australia in 1929, to take up the post of technical editor of Wireless Weekly in Sydney. A year or two later he resumed his experimental and journalism work with ARRL at Hartford, Connecticut. He was particularly interested in UHF communication and built a radio-controlled glider. Early in 1938 he assumed American nationality and was appointed editor of QST. For over six months he was actively engaged in experiments in television, then was killed when he accidentally received a shock of 6,000 volts while experimenting with television apparatus in the laboratory of his summer residence at Vernon, Connecticut.
