= From A to Z =

Musical revue

- Program, Shubert Theatre, New Haven
- Music: Various
- Lyrics: Various
- Book: Woody Allen; Herbert Farjeon; Nina Warner Hook
- Basis: Revue
- Productions: 1960 Broadway

From A to Z is a musical revue with a book by Woody Allen, Herbert Farjeon, and Nina Warner Hook and songs by Jerry Herman, Fred Ebb, Mary Rodgers, Everett Sloane, Jay Thompson, Dickson Hughes, Jack Holmes, Paul Klein, Norman Martin, William Dyer, and Charles Zwar.

== Background ==
Hermione Gingold was asked to appear in a revue on Broadway by millionaires (and producers) Carroll Masterson and Harris Masterson and she asked her friend, Christopher Hewett to direct. Hewett in turn recruited some of the cast and crew from Tamiment (an entertainment camp run in the summer), including the young Jonathan Tunick, then a Juilliard student, as co-orchestrator with Jay Brower.

== Production ==
The revue had its out-of-town tryout at the Shubert Theatre, New Haven, Connecticut starting on March 26.

From A to Z opened on Broadway at the Plymouth Theatre on April 20, 1960 and closed on May 7, 1960 after 21 performances. Directed by Christopher Hewett and choreographed by Ray Harrison, the cast included Hermione Gingold, Stuart Damon, Bob Dishy, Larry Hovis, Virginia Vestoff, Alvin Epstein and Paula Stewart.

Although a critical and commercial failure, the show is notable in that it marked the Broadway debuts of writer Allen, lyricist Ebb, composer Herman, ("Also making their mainstream debuts: Fred Ebb and Woody Allen.") and performer Virginia Vestoff.

== Plot overview ==
In one sketch, Gingold and Epstein played two wealthy hypochondriacs who compare their X-rays.

== Songs ==
Act 1

- Best Gold - music and lyrics by Jerry Herman
- Pill Parade - music and lyrics by Jay Thompson
- Togetherness - music and lyrics by Dickson Hughes and Everett Sloane
- Balloons - music and lyrics by Jack Holmes
- Hire a Guy - music by Mary Rodgers, lyrics by Marshall Barer
- Interlude - music and lyrics by Jack Holmes
- I Said to Love - music by Paul Klein, lyrics by Fred Ebb
- Charlie - music and lyrics by Fred Ebb and Norman Martin
- The Sound of Schmaltz - music by William Dyer, lyrics by Don Parks

Act 2

- Grand Jury Jump - music by Paul Klein, lyrics by Fred Ebb
- South American Way - music by Norman Martin, lyrics by Norman Martin and Fred Ebb
- Time Step - music by Paul Klein, lyrics by Fred Ebb
- Red Shoes - music by Jack Holmes
- Four for the Road - music by Paul Klein, lyrics by Lee Goldsmith and Fred Ebb
- What Next? - music by Charles Zwar, lyrics by Alan Melville

== Reception ==
Brooks Atkinson in his The New York Times review noted that "There is no official writer; there is no house composer. Perhaps this is the reason the revue represents no point of view... Gingold is a comic of vast self-assurance who has very little variety." Atkinson praised the scenery and costumes ("Mr. Voelpel's costumes are also superb") and the performances of Alvin Epstein and Paula Stewart.

In its review roundup, The New York Times reported that "Only John McClain of the Journal-American gave hearty support to this new revue starring Hermione Gingold."

The Billboard reviewer noted that Gingold "displayed much keen sense of comedy; but one bright artist cannot make the production .... the scenes were not very titillating .... Musically, the individual songs were not distinctive."
