= Murder at 2FC =

- Genre: drama play
- Country of origin: Australia
- Language: English
- Home station: 2FC
- Written by: Edmund Barclay
- Recording studio: Sydney
- Original release: 1935

Murder at 2FC is a 1935 Australian radio play by Edmund Barclay. It was an adaptation of the British film Death at Broadcasting House with the action relocated to Australia - specially at the Sydney radio station 2FC run by the Australian Broadcasting Commission.

The play mixed fictional characters with real ones, including several top ABC executives.

== Premise ==
An actor is murdered while taking part in a live drama at radio station 2FC.

"Actually heard by thousands of listeners throughout the Commonwealth, a murder is committed in the heart of Sydney – such are the sensational facts in this most original Radio Mystery. The scene of the murder is in a Studio at National Station 2PC, and the victim an actor who is taking part in a broadcast play at the very moment of his death. Many famous Australian Radio Personalities are innocently involved in the crime, and some even suspected of complicity. Incidentally during the course of the play many fascinating details of broadcasting methods are revealed, and listeners are taken right behind the microphone. "

== Cast ==
- Ronald Morse as the author
- Vivian Edwards as the detective
- Nancye Stewart as Isobel Dryden
- Walter Plinge as the lover
- Mayne Linton as Leopold Dryden
- Robin Ordell as the boy
- Bert Barton as the doorman
- Charles Wheeler as Sydney Parsons
- Guy Bannister as Eric Masters
- H. G. Horner (State Manager of the ABC) as himself
- Reg Hawthorne (2FC control room operator) as himself
- Ewart Chapple (programme director) as himself
- James J. Donnelly (research department) as himself
- Heath Burdock (announcer) as himself
- Bryson Taylor (announcer) as himself
- Conrad Sharlton (studio manager) as himself
- Lawrence H. Cecil (dramatic producer) as himself
- Fred Wahite (conductor) as himself
- Oscar Lansbury (sound effects sect as himselfion)
- Professor Charteris (lecturer) as himself
- Rene Dixon (soubrette)
- Grace Quine (singer).
