= Fatty Finn =

Australian comic strip series

- comic strip c1920s
- Author: Syd Nicholls
- Launch date: 16 September 1923
- End date: July 1977
- Alternate name(s): Fat and his Friends
- Genre: Humor

Fatty Finn was a popular long-run Australian comic strip series, created in 1923 by Syd Nicholls. It ran in syndication until the creator's death in 1977.

== History ==
In 1923 Syd Nicholls, a senior artist at Sydney's Evening News, was asked by managing editor, Errol Knox, to produce a Sunday comic strip to compete with a popular strip in the rival Sunday Times, the hugely popular Us Fellers, produced by Jimmy Bancks. Knox reportedly requested a "domestic strip" stating that "The Sunday Times and Sunday Sun are both running a colour comic and we have to do something to compete". The strip was initially called Fat and His Friends and was first published in the Sunday News on 16 September 1923. Fat appeared as a Billy Bunterish almost bald, nasty schoolboy, complete with straw boater. Fat was usually the butt of his friend's jokes, with those early strips exhibiting much of the cruelty practised by children and reflecting a school system which believed in corporal punishment.

In August 1924 the title of the strip was changed to Fatty Finn, heralding a change in the strip's direction and the role of the main character, who evolved from an English boy lookalike into a knockabout schoolboy innocently living out his days in a never-never urban world. Over the next few years, Fatty gradually lost weight, gained a Boy Scout style uniform, a dog ('Pal'), a goat ('Hector') and permanent supporting characters including Headlights Hogan, Lollylegs, Bruiser and Mr. Claffey the policeman. Fatty adopted a more heroic role and the comic moved closer to the standard 'kid' strip with a distinct Australian flavour. In the opinion of Paul Byrnes, the curator of the National Film and Sound Archive, "Fatty Finn is highly influenced by C. J. Dennis’ classic story of a sentimental tough guy from a poor inner-city neighbourhood. Fatty is a half-pint version of the 'Bloke' with his own 'push' of tiny would-be toughs and molls, who already have a strong sense of how the world works." John Ryan, in his Australian Comic anthology, Panel by Panel, describes the strip as by the late 1920s having become the most visually pleasing strip in the country.

Nicholls' fine draftmanship and experimentation with long sweeping panels and tall, column-like frames were complemented by vibrant colouring.

— John Ryan

Fatty Finn came to be recognised as one of the best-drawn comics in Australia and vied with Ginger Meggs in popularity. Fatty Finn, although better drawn than Ginger Meggs, was less humorous, and ultimately less successful. Nicholls however became frustrated with the limitations of the strip and on 10 June 1928 he introduced an adventure theme by involving Fatty in fanciful tales of pirates, cannibals and highwaymen. The editor, Errol Knox, was not impressed and Nicholls reverted to the accepted style of comic. In June 1929 he introduced another adventure sequence but was again discouraged by Knox. In 1930 The Sunday News was amalgamated with The Sunday Guardian (which had become the home of Meggs) and the two comic characters were forced to co-exist in the one colour supplement. In 1931 Nicholls travelled to the United States returning in 1932, where having left enough to cover his absence, he continued producing Fatty Finn. In May 1933 he was sacked by his then editor, Eric Baume, without explanation. The last episode of Fatty Finn to run in the Sunday Sun appeared on 18 June 1933.

Nicholls subsequently teamed up with another artist, Stan Clements, to start the first ever locally produced weekly comic book. Fatty Finn's Weekly was launched on 20 May 1934 as a black and white eight tabloid pages of comics and text, with a spot colour cover. Fatty Finn made an appearance and Nicholls also contributed a center spread continuity strip called "Forest of Fear". The rest of the comic featured Australian artists only, with other strips such as Basso the Bear and Pam and Pospsy Penguin by 'Hotpoint' and Ossie by George Little. While there was text below each frame, the panels contained word balloons. The ninth issue is a series of coupons - three of which made the sender a member of "Fatty Finn's Club" (complete with membership certificate and a badge). Nicholls then approached Frank Packer, who took over the publishing of the comic in November 1934. Under the new management the size of the comic increased to sixteen pages, a red tint added to the covers and centrespread, and the price increased from 1d to 2d. Packer also added a US strip, Brick Bradford but did not increase the volume of comic strips instead padding out the additional pages with text. Nicholls disagreed with the direction that the comic book was taking. The comic struggled before folding in early 1935.

Fatty Finn was later published in the Sunday Guardian from 1934. When the Guardian folded the strip re-emerged in December 1951, after an absence of almost 20 years, when it appeared in the Sunday Herald. In 1953 following the merger of the Sunday Herald and Sunday Sun and Guardian, the strip continued in the new Sun-Herald. Nicholls never changed his style of drawing. For fifty years he went on drawing the strip in exactly the same 1920s style. The strip ran until Nicholls' death in 1977, with the last strip running in July 1977.

== Film adaptations ==
In 1927 a silent black and white film, The Kid Stakes, written and directed by Tal Ordell, was released featuring Fatty Finn and his goat, Hector. The film also contained a segment showing Nicolls at his drawing board, creating his famous characters. It was the first feature film to be based on an Australian comic strip.

In 1980 the strip was adapted into a feature film, Fatty Finn, directed by Maurice Murphy and starring Ben Oxenbould with Rebecca Rigg. The film grossed $1,064,000 at the box office in Australia and was nominated for seven Australian Film Institute Awards in 1981 winning in the categories of 'Best Achievement in Costume Design' and 'Best Original Music Score'. In the same year Sydney journalist and screenwriter Bob Ellis produced a book of the movie, The Adventures of Fatty Finn with illustrations taken from Nicholls' original drawings.
