= Man with a Load of Mischief =

- Music: John Clifton
- Lyrics: Ben Tarver; John Clifton
- Book: Ben Tarver
- Basis: the play by Ashley Dukes
- Productions: 1966 Off Broadway

Man with a Load of Mischief is a musical, with a book by Ben Tarver, music by John Clifton, and lyrics by Clifton and Tarver. It is based on the play by Ashley Dukes.

== Original production ==
Man with a Load of Mischief opened 6 November 1966 at the Jan Hus Playhouse, 351 East 74th Street, New York City. On 17 May 1967, it transferred to the Provincetown Playhouse, 139 MacDougal Street, where it closed on 4 June after 241 performances.

It was staged by Tom Gruenewald; setting and lighting by Joan Larkey; costumes by Volavkova; Choreography by Noel Schwartz; musical direction by Sande Campbell; orchestrations by Mr. Clifton; and produced by Donald H. Goldman.

== 1966 off-Broadway cast ==
- Innkeeper - Tom Noel
- His wife - Lesslie Nicol
- Lord - Raymond Thorne
- Man - Reid Shelton
- Lady - Virginia Vestoff
- Maid - Alice Cannon
