= Ron Vivian =

Australian cartoonist

- Born: Ronald Charles Vivian; 19 February 1914 Sydney, New South Wales, Australia
- Died: 5 September 1973 (aged 59) St Leonards, New South Wales, Australia
- Area: Cartoonist
- Notable works: Ginger Meggs

Ron Vivian (19 February 1914 – 5 September 1973) was an Australian cartoonist who is perhaps best known as having drawn Ginger Meggs after the original creator, Jimmy Bancks died in 1952.

== Biography ==
Ronald Charles Vivian was born on 19 February 1914 in Sydney, New South Wales, to Charles Cecil Vivian and Vida Francis.

Vivian enlisted in the Royal Australian Air Force (RAAF) in January 1942 and served in Australia and New Guinea during the Second World War. Vivian was awarded the 1939-45 Star, Pacific Star, War Medal 1939-45 and Australian Service Medal 1939-45. Upon his return he was appointed to the Victorian Air Board where he illustrated many RAAF magazines before returning to civilian life.

He worked as an artist for Sir Frank Packer's Australian Consolidated Press (ACP), drawing political cartoons for The Daily Telegraph, illustrations for The Australian Women's Weekly and other Consolidated Press publications. When Jim Bancks died suddenly of a heart attack in 1952, Packer held a competition among several artists to select a suitable person to continue to draw Ginger Meggs. Numerous artists submitted trial pages and in the end Vivian's entry was chosen over others including Dan Russell (whom Packer thought that his brother Jim Russell had drawn instead). He then drew the comic for ACP's Sunday Telegraph from April 1953 for the next twenty one years, until his death in early 1973. Vivian remained true to the Bancks style and concept and the only difference was the signature, with the strip carrying the identification 'Created by Bancks', as he was not permitted to put his name to the drawings.
