= Errol Galbraith Knox =

Australian newspaperman (1889–1949)

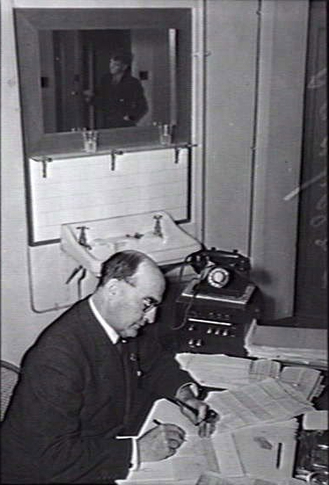
- Born: 25 June 1889; Glebe, New South Wales
- Died: 17 October 1949 (aged 60); Melbourne, Victoria
- Education: University of Sydney
- Military career
- Branch: First Australian Imperial Force; Second Australian Imperial Force
- Service years: 1915–1920, 1942–1944
- Rank: Brigadier
- Service number: VX91041
- Conflicts: First World War; Western Front; Occupation of the Rhineland; Second World War
- Awards: Knight Bachelor; Member of the Order of the British Empire; Mentioned in despatches

Sir Errol Galbraith Knox, MBE (25 June 1889 – 17 October 1949) was an Australian newspaperman. A graduate of the University of Sydney, he served in the Australian Flying Corps in the First World War. During the Second World War, he was the Army's director-general of public relations.

== Early life ==
Errol Galbraith Knox was born in the Sydney suburb of Glebe on 25 June 1889, the eighth child of Joseph Knox, a grocer, and his wife Elizabeth Jane née Drew. He was educated at Fort Street Public School, where he acquired the nickname "Knocker", and at the University of Sydney, where he studied for a Bachelor of Arts degree. While there, he served in the Sydney University Scouts. He left in 1910 to pursue a career in newspapers. He worked as a sub-editor for the Sunday Times in Sydney, which sent him the United States to learn his chosen craft with the Hearst organisation.

== First World War ==
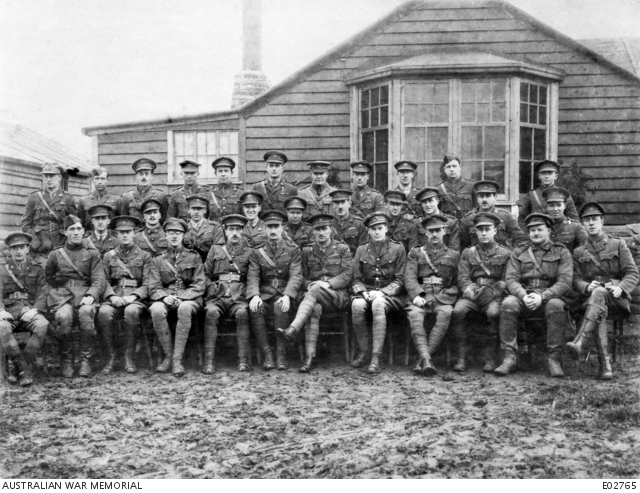
Group portrait of the officers of No. 3 Squadron, Australian Flying Corps. Knox is sitting in the front row, fifth from the left.

The outbreak of the First World War in 1914 caused Knox to return home, where he enlisted in the First Australian Imperial Force (AIF) in July 1915. He rose to become an acting company sergeant major before being commissioned as a second lieutenant on 24 September, and was assigned to the 12th Reinforcements of the 2nd Battalion. Following officer training, he embarked for the Egypt on the SS Medic on 9 January 1916. On 12 January 1917, he was promoted to lieutenant and transferred to No. 3 Squadron, Australian Flying Corps. He departed for France with the squadron on the RMS Saxonia on 27 March 1916. However, he was hospitalised with haemorrhoids on 26 April, and then with appendicitis, resulting in an operation on 8 June, and he did not return to France until 24 August 1917.

Promoted to captain on 1 January 1918, Knox was attached to the Royal Air Force as a staff officer in July 1918 and served with No. 15 Wing RAF and No. 22 Wing RAF. He was granted the temporary rank on major on 11 October and participated in the Allied occupation of the Rhineland after hostilities ended the following month. For his services, he was mentioned in despatches on 31 December 1918, and he became a Member of the Order of the British Empire on 3 June 1919. On 4 September 1919, he married Gertrude Mary Coore in a Roman Catholic ceremony (although he was brought up as a Presbyterian) in the Priory of our Lady of England in Thakeham. They had three children: Peter, Patricia and Pamela. He embarked for Australia with his wife on the SS Themistocles on 22 December. His AIF appointment was terminated on 18 May 1920, and he was officially transferred to the Reserve of Officers on 29 September.

== Between the wars ==
After the war, Knox resumed his career as a newspaper editor in Sydney, joining Smith's Weekly as a sub-editor in February 1920. He then became news editor of the Daily Telegraph. In 1922, he became the managing editor of the The Evening News. The paper was failing and circulation had dropped to 30,000 per day. By 1928, Knox had turned it around; circulation had increased to 125,000 copies per day and the annual dividend from 7 to 10 per cent. In 1931, The Evening News was acquired by Sir Hugh Denison's Associated Newspapers group, which closed it down, and Knox resigned.

Over the next few years, he edited or produced the Newspaper News, Who's Who in Australia and Medical Directory for Australia. He founded and partly owned To-Day, a monthly magazine. In 1937 he moved to Melbourne as editor of The Argus. He became its managing director in 1940. Sir Keith Murdoch, the chairman of directors of The Herald and Weekly Times later recalled that Knox "brought the Argus to financial strength from a position of collapse, and I do not know anyone else in Australia who could-have done it. This was due to his masterly technical capacities and qualities of character and industry, which were outstanding".

== Second World War ==
On 28 December 1942, Knox joined the Second Australian Imperial Force as Director General of Public Relations, with the rank of brigadier and the service number VX91041. In this role he oversaw the publicity and the work of war correspondents and the collection of material for military history. He travelled widely, to the front in New Guinea, and to the United States and United Kingdom in May to November 1943. However, his health declined. He relinquished the appointment and was transferred to the retired list on 31 January 1944.

== Later life ==
In March 1946, Knox was appointed a trustee of the National Museum of Victoria. He was a director of the Royal Prince Alfred Hospital in Sydney from 1925 to 1930 and in Melbourne was a board member of St Vincent's Hospital. He was a member of Melbourne metropolitan racing clubs and was chairman of Hanging Rock Racing Club. He bought a cattle and ship stud farm at Woodend, Victoria. He was knighted for his services in the 1949 New Year Honours.

Knox died from a coronary occlusion in Mount Saint Evin's Private Hospital in Melbourne on 17 October 1949. A requiem mass was held at St Patrick's Cathedral, Melbourne, celebrated by Archbishop Justin Simonds and presided over by Archbishop Daniel Mannix. Staff of The Argus (Melbourne) lined the footpath on Elizabeth Street. Among those present were the Premier of Victoria, Thomas Hollway, Lieutenant Generals Iven Mackay and Cyril Clowes, and newspapermen Sir Keith Murdoch and Hugh Syme. He was buried at Woodend Cemetery.
