= Ginger Meggs =

Australian comic strip

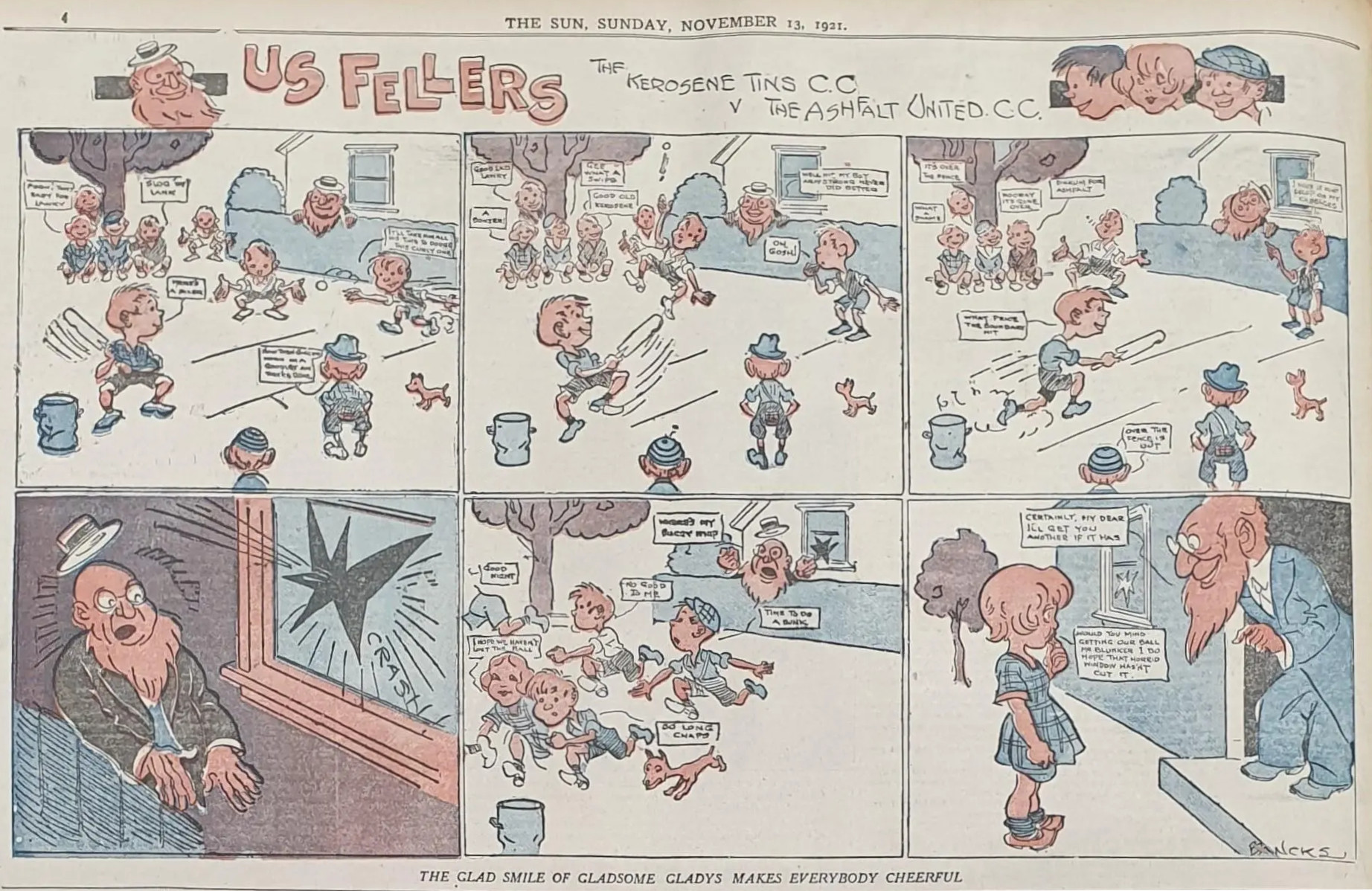
- First appearance of Ginger, 13 November 1921
- Author: Jimmy Bancks (1921–1952); Ron Vivian (1953-1973); Lloyd Piper(1973-1983); James Kemsley (1984-2007); Jason Chatfield (2007–2023)
- Website: www.gocomics.com/gingermeggs
- Current status/schedule: Current daily & Sunday strip
- Launch date: 13 November 1921
- End date: 13 August 2023
- Alternate name: Us Fellers
- Syndicate(s): Universal Press Syndicate/Universal Uclick/Andrews McMeel Syndication (2004–present)
- Genre: Humour

Ginger Meggs, created in 1921 by Jimmy Bancks, is one of Australia's most popular and the longest-running comic strip. The strip follows the escapades of a red-haired prepubescent mischief-maker who lives in an inner suburban working-class household. While employed at The Bulletin, Bancks submitted cartoons to the Sydney Sunday Sun, where he began his Us Fellers strip in 1921 in the "Sunbeams" section of the Sunday Sun. Ginger first appeared in Us Fellers on 13 November 1921, drawn by Bancks. When Bancks died on 1 July 1952 from a heart attack, Ron Vivian took over the strip (1953–1973), followed by Lloyd Piper (1973–1982), James Kemsley (1983–2007), and Jason Chatfield since 2007. In 2023, it was announced that the series would be discontinued.

== Publication history ==
Bancks created, wrote, drew, and syndicated Ginger Meggs from 1921 until 1952, when he died unexpectedly of a heart attack. After Bancks's death, there was a year's worth of strips to run while another artist was found.

Ron Vivian wrote and drew Ginger Meggs from 1953 until 1973.

Lloyd Piper wrote and drew Ginger Meggs from 1973 until 1983, when he died in a car accident.

James Kemsley wrote, drew and syndicated Ginger Meggs from 1984 to 2007. On 3 December 2007, Kemsley died at Bowral Hospital. In the 2008 Queen's Birthday Honour lists, the Australian Government posthumously recognised Kemsley for his efforts with the Medal of the Order of Australia.

Jason Chatfield wrote and drew Ginger Meggs from 2007 to 2023. It has since run in repeats online at GoComics.

The strip was the most widely syndicated Australian comic strip, appearing in over 120 newspapers in 34 countries. In 1997, a park in Valley Road, Hornsby, was officially named Ginger Meggs Park. Bancks had spent much time in the area during his childhood.

In September 2022, News Corporation removed all daily comic strips from their publications across Australia. Ginger Meggs ceased appearing in print as a daily strip as of 12 September. On 13 August 2023, Fairfax/Nine Media ran the final Ginger Meggs comic strip. They then made the decision to remove all comic strips from their publications. The collective decision by newspaper editors all over Australia in 2023 to no longer publish the Ginger Meggs comic forced Jason Chatfield to stop drawing Ginger Meggs. The strip ran for a total of 101 years and 9 months.

Australian Prime Minister Anthony Albanese called the decision “...just another step in the decline of modern media.”

== Commemoratives ==
In 1985, a postage stamp honouring Ginger or his creator was issued by Australia Post as part of a set of five commemorating children's books.

On 1 July 2011, the Perth Mint released a commemorative 1oz Silver Australian $1 coin to celebrate the 90th anniversary of Ginger Meggs. The coin features an homage to James C. Bancks' 1945 Sunbeams Annual (Series 22) cover, which featured Ginger Meggs on the back of a kangaroo with his dog, Mike and his pet monkey, Tony. The obverse portrays the Ian Rank-Broadley effigy of Her Majesty Queen Elizabeth II, the 2011 year-date and is issued as legal tender under the Australian Currency Act 1965. The coin was designed by current Ginger Meggs cartoonist, Jason Chatfield.

On 4 May 2021, to commemorate the 100th Anniversary of the first appearance of Ginger Meggs, a book was published by Penguin Random House. The 4-story novelisation was authored by Tristan Bancks, the great-grandnephew of Ginger Meggs creator, Jimmy Bancks, and was illustrated by current Ginger Meggs cartoonist Jason Chatfield.

On 2 June 2021, to commemorate the 100th Anniversary of the first appearance of Ginger Meggs, The Royal Australian Mint released a series of commemorative Australian $1 coins with Ginger Meggs designs from 1921 and 2021. The obverse portrays the Ian Rank-Broadley effigy of Her Majesty Queen Elizabeth II, the 2021 year-date and is issued as legal tender under the Australian Currency Act 1965.

On 7 September 2021, to commemorate the 100th Anniversary of the first appearance of Ginger Meggs, a series of stamps was released by Australia Post. Ginger Meggs appears not just in the stamp designs but also in a host of philatelic products, including a minisheet, stamp pack, first day cover, a maxicard set and two stamp and coin covers, housing coins produced by the Royal Australian Mint.

== In other media ==
=== Film ===
Ginger Meggs
- Directed by: Jonathan Dawson
- Written by: Michael Latimer
- Produced by: John Saxton
- Starring: Drew Forsythe; Garry McDonald
- Cinematography: John Seale
- Release date: 1982
- Country: Australia
- Language: English
- Budget: A$1.3 million
- Box office: A$990,000 (Australia)

Ginger Meggs is a 1982 Australian film based on the comic strip, starring Garry McDonald and Drew Forsythe.

The film was criticised for including rock songs on the soundtrack.

==== Cast ====
- Garry McDonald
- Drew Forsythe as Tiger Kelly
- Terry Camilleri as Mr Crackett
- John Clayton as Mr Wentworth
- Willie Fennell as Walter Fotheringay
- Harold Hopkins as Mr Fox

=== Stage musical ===
Ginger Meggs was also adapted into a stage musical which has been running since the early 1990s, distributed by David Spicer Productions.

=== Songs ===
- "Ginger Meggs: The Sunbeams Song" music by Henry T. Hayes and Billy Edwards (c1923)
- Ginger Meggs / words and music by Jack O'Hagan
- Just a Little Ginger Headed Feller, words and music by Mary Brett, arranged by Tom Davidson (1938)

== Bibliography ==
- A birthday celebration for Ginger Meggs: congratulations to the little Aussie battler, by Robert Holden (1986)
- The comic adventures of Ginger Meggs, created by Jimmy Bancks, written and drawn by James Kemsley (1986, ISBN 0-7316-0697-3)
- Further adventures of Ginger Meggs
- Ginger Meggs and Herbert the billy goat
- Ginger Meggs and the country cousin
- Ginger Meggs annual
- Ginger Meggs at large: based on the stories and characters of Bancks
- Ginger Meggs, created by Jimmy Bancks, written & drawn by Kemsley
- Ginger Meggs' lucky break
- Ginger Meggs meets the test, written by Bill Peach, illustrated by Dan Russell (1975, ISBN 0-207-13601-7)
- Ginger Meggs, written by Tristan Bancks, illustrated by Jason Chatfield (2021, ISBN 9781760147532)
