= Jimmy Bancks =

Australian cartoonist

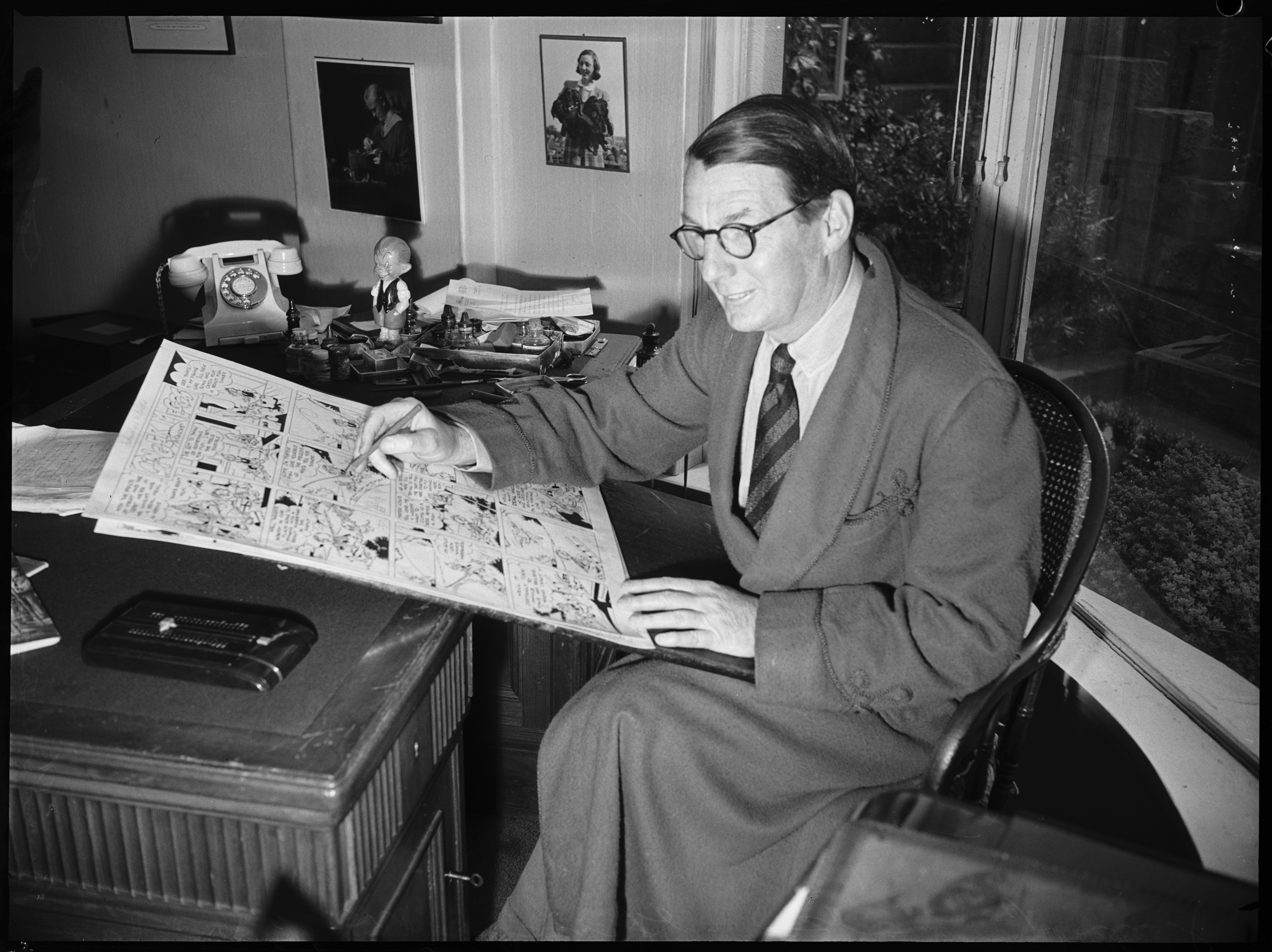
- Jimmy Bancks, photographed in October 1942.
- Born: James Charles Bancks; 10 May 1889 Enmore, New South Wales, Australia
- Died: 1 July 1952 (aged 63) Point Piper, New South Wales, Australia
- Areas: Comic artist, commercial artist, book illustrator,
- Notable works: Ginger Meggs

James Charles Bancks (10 May 1889 – 1 July 1952), commonly J. C. Bancks, was an Australian cartoonist and commercial artist, writer and illustrator best known for his comic strip Ginger Meggs.

== Biography ==
James Charles Bancks was born in Enmore, New South Wales, Australia on 10 May 1889, the son of an Irish railway worker, John Spencer Bancks. Bancks left school at the age of 14 and found employment with a finance company. His first illustrations were accepted and published by The Comic Australian in 1913, followed by The Arrow in 1914. This encouraged Bancks to submit work to The Bulletin, where he was offered a permanent position, which he accepted and remained until 1922. Throughout this period he was studying art under Dattilo Rubbo and Julian Ashton and supplying freelance cartoons to the Sunday Herald Sun.

He created Us Fellers (later Ginger Meggs) for the Sunday Sun and Sun News-Pictorial. Bancks created The Blimps for the Melbourne Sun in 1923, and this daily strip ran until 1925, the year he launched Mr Melbourne for the Sun News-Pictorial.

=== Personal life ===
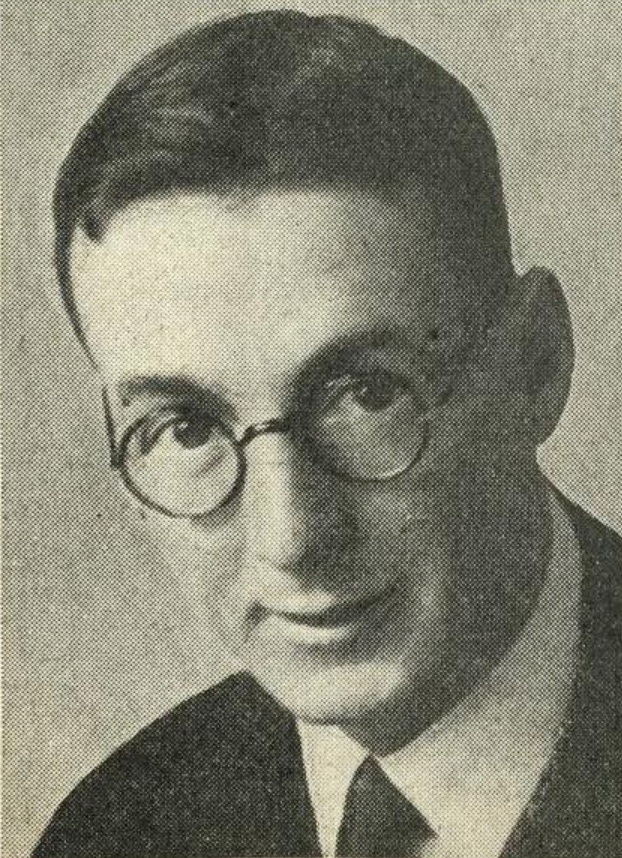
Jimmy Bancks as a young man

On 15 October 1931 Bancks married Jessie Nita Tait (daughter of theatrical entrepreneur, Edward Tait) at St Mark's Church, Darling Point. She first worked as fashion adviser to her father's enterprise, since 1933 she published the column "Fashion Parade" in Australian Women's Weekly. Jessie died in childbirth on 22 November 1936. In 1938 he married Patricia Quinan in Yuma, Arizona in the United States. Their adopted daughter, the artist Sheena Bancks, married the actor Michael Latimer.

Bancks died on 1 July 1952 from a heart attack at his home in Point Piper.

On 26 July 1997, the Mayor of Hornsby formally named a park in Hornsby after Bancks's character Ginger Meggs. The area had an association with Bancks because he used to spend time there in his childhood. The park is located on Valley Road, adjacent to a creek that was named Jimmy Bancks Creek.

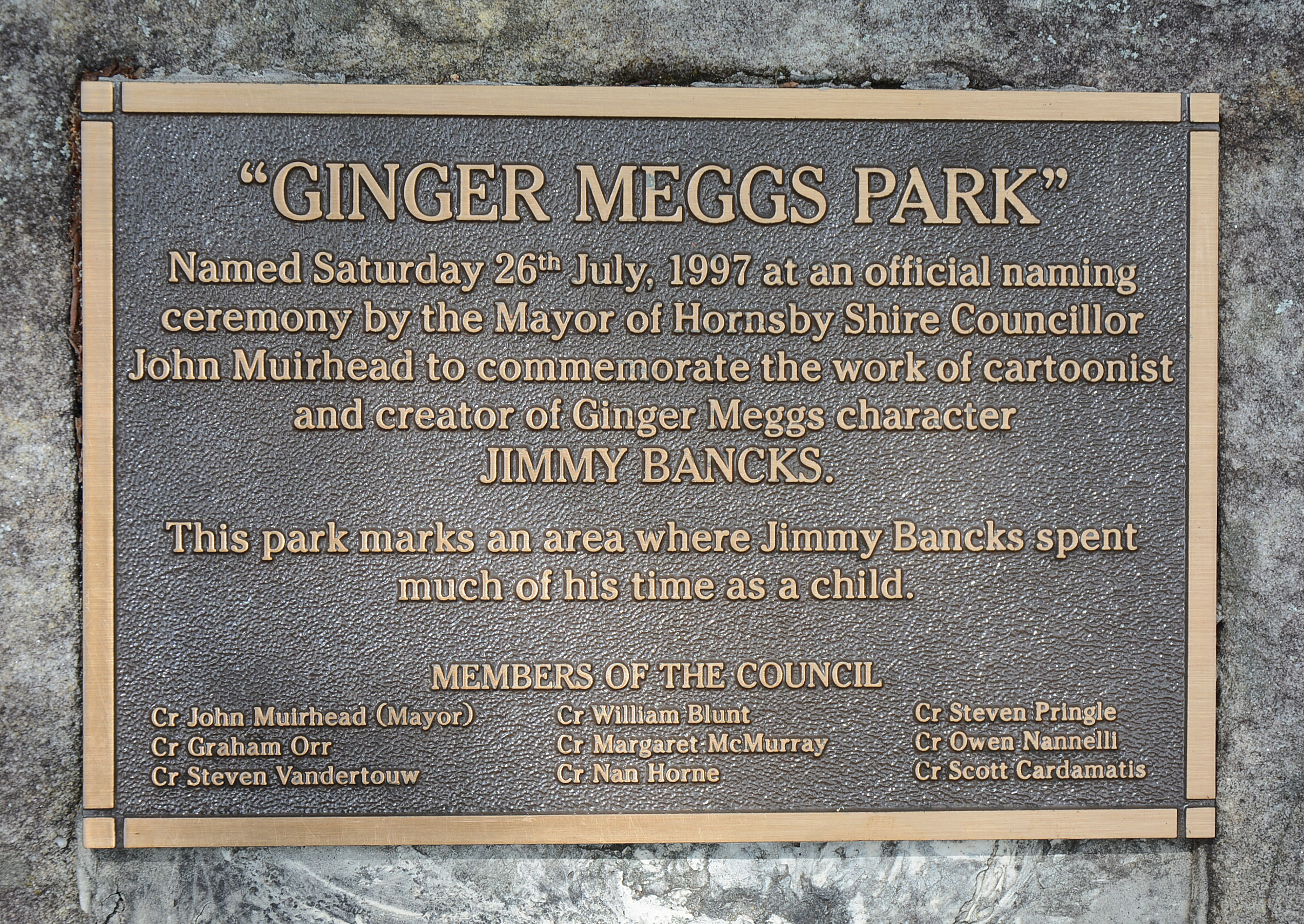
Plaque in Ginger Meggs Park, Hornsby, which was named after Bancks's character.

On 27 April 2023, a plaque to commemorate Bancks was formally unveiled at a ceremony at Woollahra Libraries attended by Councillor Richard Shields, Councillor Mary-Lou Jarvis, Kellie Sloane - Member for Vaucluse, Bancks' descendants, cartoonists, and Library local history staff. The plaque is to be installed at his longtime home in Point Piper. The Woollahra Council Plaque Scheme honours exceptional people or events associated with the local government area that have made a significant impact on life in the area or Australia as a nation. It was the 41st plaque in the library's Historical Plaque Scheme.

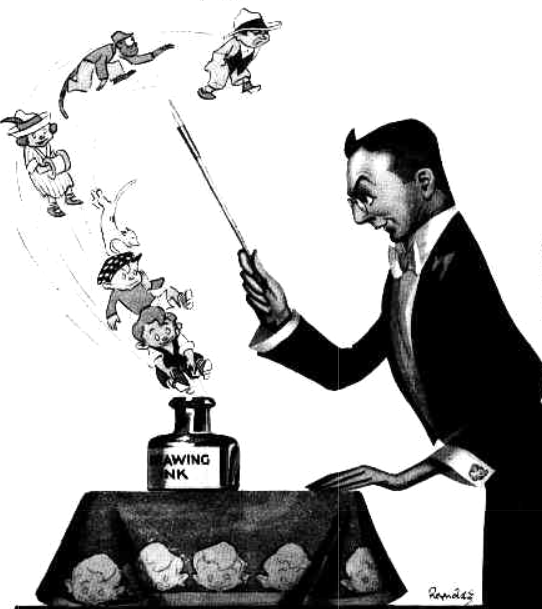
1928 caricature by Reynolds

== Selected writings ==
- Ginger Meggs (1922–1952) – cartoon
- Impressions of the Artists' Ball : In Line and in Rhythm (1922) – poetry
- The Sunshine Family : A Book of Nonsense for Girls and Boys (1923) – children's fiction
- Party Impressions (1929) – short story
- The Man Who Knew Mailey (1930) – short story
- Blue Mountains Melody (1934) – musical
