= Larry Kent =

Larry or Lawrence Kent may refer to:

- Larry Kent (actor) (1900–1967), American film actor and producer
- Larry Kent (filmmaker) (born 1937), Canadian filmmaker
- Larry Kent, a book series by Cleveland Publishing
