= Desmond Robert Dunn =

Australian author (1929–2003)

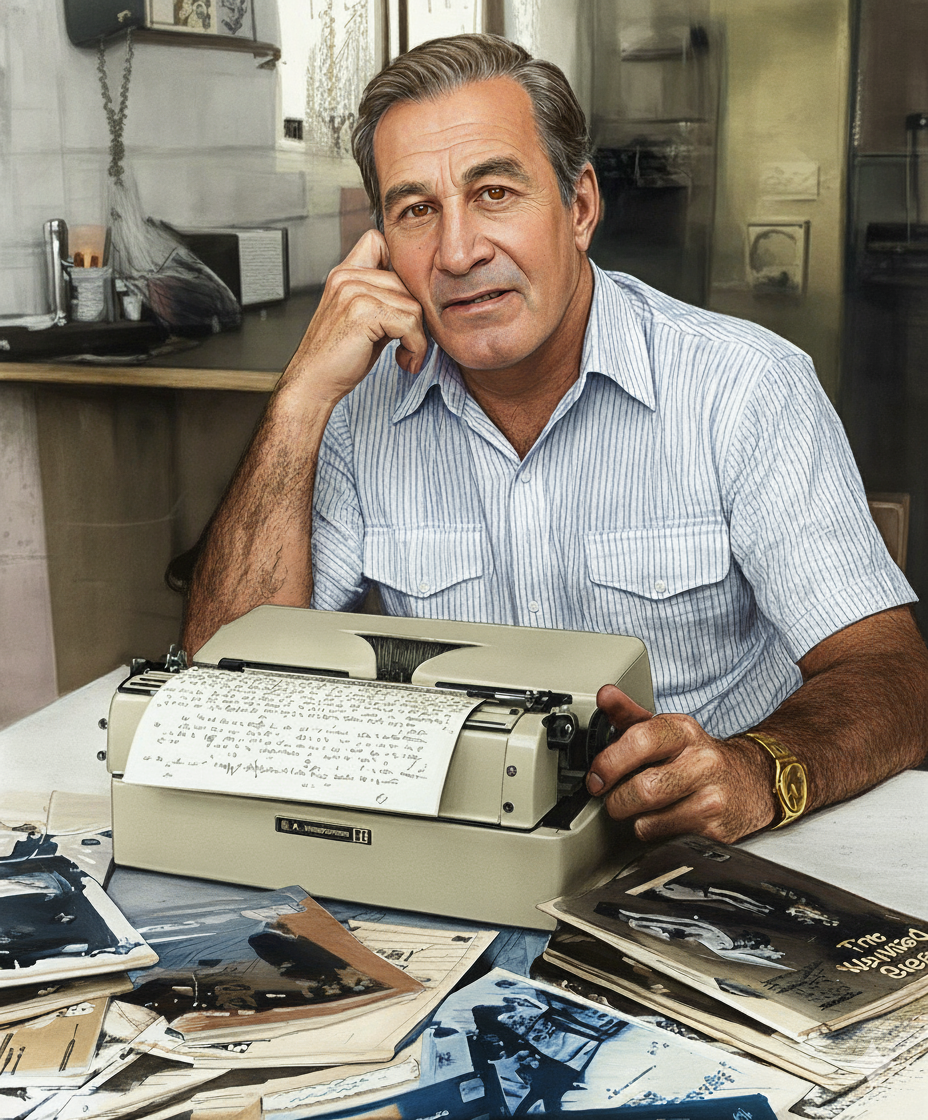
Desmond Robert Dunn at work

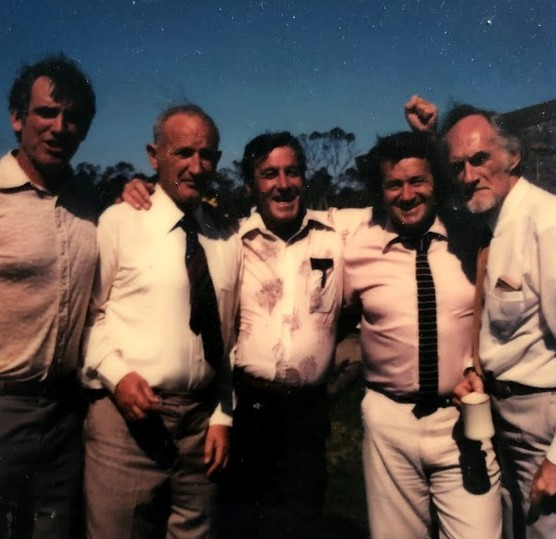
Les Atkins, Jack Atkins, Des Dunn, Paul Wheelahan and Stan Pitt

Desmond Robert Dunn (6 November 1929 – 5 May 2003) was an Australian author of crime fiction and western fiction.

== Background ==
Dunn was born Robert Desmond Dunn in Mackay, Queensland, but was known as Desmond Robert Dunn or Des Dunn. He was educated at St Joseph's Nudgee College in Queensland.

Dunn wrote fiction paperback novellas published by Cleveland Publishing from 1955 until 1989. He wrote four crime titles as Des R. Dunn in the mid-1950s. Dunn is also believed to have written up to 80 of the 290-300 titles of the well-known Larry Kent detective series.

Dunn is best known for his western novellas published under several pseudonyms. Dunn's pseudonyms included: Shad Denver, Gunn Halliday, Adam Brady, Brett Iverson, Matt Cregan, Sheldon B. Cole, Walt Renwick and Morgan Culp. He is known to have written over 500 titles using these pseudonyms. The great majority of Dunn's titles were 40,000 words long. Over a 34 year writing career it is estimated that he wrote between 24 and 30 million words; most of which was published.

Dunn married and divorced twice and had three children. Dunn died in Brisbane, Queensland aged 73.

== Bibliography ==
Dunn's publications under his name include:

- 'Desperate Call', (195-?), Silhouette Detective, Number 751, Cleveland Publishing, Sydney, Australia.
- 'Farewell to Peril', (195-?), Silhouette Detective, Number 750, Cleveland Publishing, Sydney, Australia.
- 'Go Lightly, Stranger', (195-?), Marlin Book, Number 570, Cleveland Publishing, Sydney, Australia.
- 'Night Crime', (195-?), New York Detective, Number 751, Cleveland Publishing, Sydney, Australia.

Dunn's publications as Shad Denver include:

- 'A Killer Can Die', (196-), Chisholm Western, Number 691, Cleveland Publishing, Sydney, Australia.
- 'A Notch Called Nero', (197-), Peacemaker Western, Number 216, Cleveland Publishing, Sydney, Australia.
- 'A Score to Settle', (198-), Cleveland Western, Number 2150, Cleveland Publishing, Sydney, Australia.
- 'A Town Divided', (1967), Phoenix Western, Number 271, Cleveland Publishing, Sydney, Australia.
- 'Along Came Munro', (196-), Big Horn Western, Number 347, Cleveland Publishing, Sydney, Australia.
- 'Amen for Fools', (1992), Bison Western, Number 1045, Cleveland Publishing, Sydney, Australia.
- 'Beholden to Kill', (196-), Santa Fe Western, Number 336, Cleveland Publishing, Sydney, Australia.
- 'Bible's Hireling', (196-), Chisholm Western, Number 687, Cleveland Publishing, Sydney, Australia.
- 'Big Man', (195-), Chisholm Western, Number 665, Cleveland Publishing, Sydney, Australia.
- 'Big Man Country', (196-), Winchester Western, Number 793, Cleveland Publishing, Sydney, Australia.
- 'Big Men Fall Hard', (196-), Arizona Western, Number 122, Cleveland Publishing, Sydney, Australia.
- 'Blood Hatred', (196-), Bison Western, Number 145, Cleveland Publishing, Sydney, Australia.
- 'Blood is the Spur', (1966), Bison Western, Number 346, Cleveland Publishing, Sydney, Australia.
- 'Blood on Big River', (196-), Cleveland Western, Number 1224, Cleveland Publishing, Sydney, Australia.
- 'Blood Valley', (196-), Pinto Western, Number 417, Cleveland Publishing, Sydney, Australia.
- 'Bloodlines Don't Lie', (1989), Bison Western, Number 952, Cleveland Publishing, Sydney, Australia.
- 'Boothill Branded', (196-), Condor Western, Number 226, Cleveland Publishing, Sydney, Australia.
- 'Boothill Debt', (196-), Chisholm Western, Number 686, Cleveland Publishing, Sydney, Australia.
- 'Boothill for Innocents', (196-), Sierra Western, Number 449, Cleveland Publishing, Sydney, Australia.
- 'Boothill Vengeance', (196-), Condor Western, Number 243, Cleveland Publishing, Sydney, Australia.
- 'Bounty in Blood', (196-), Winchester Western, Number 738, Cleveland Publishing, Sydney, Australia.
- 'Branded', (195-), Chisholm Western, Number 666, Cleveland Publishing, Sydney, Australia.
- 'Bring Him Back Dead', (196-), Chisholm Western, Number 706, Cleveland Publishing, Sydney, Australia.
- 'Bristow's Noon', (1968), Cleveland Classic, Number 132, Cleveland Publishing, Sydney, Australia.
- 'Buchanan', (1970), Cleveland Western, Number 1345, Cleveland Publishing, Sydney, Australia.
- 'Bullet Whipped', (196-), Winchester Western, Number 729, Cleveland Publishing, Sydney, Australia.
- 'Bullets at Broken Ridge', (196-), Bison Western, Number 116, Cleveland Publishing, Sydney, Australia.
- 'Call Me Mister!', (196-), Chisholm Western, Number 658, Cleveland Publishing, Sydney, Australia.
- 'Candidate for a Rope', (196-), Sierra Western, Number 447, Cleveland Publishing, Sydney, Australia.
- 'Code of a Rebel', (1970), Lobo Western, Number 279, Cleveland Publishing, Sydney, Australia.
- 'Colorado Spread', (196-), Bison Western, Number 305, Cleveland Publishing, Sydney, Australia.
- 'Cowards Die Twice', (1972), Iron Horse Western, Number 221, Cleveland Publishing, Sydney, Australia.
- 'Cut a Notch', (196-), Condor Western, Number 161, Cleveland Publishing, Sydney, Australia.
- 'Danby Territory', (196-), Santa Fe Western, Number 376, Cleveland Publishing, Sydney, Australia.
- 'Day of the Gun', (196-), Pinto Western, Number 413, Cleveland Publishing, Sydney, Australia.
- 'Dead Man's Gun', (195-), Chisholm Western, Number 674, Cleveland Publishing, Sydney, Australia.
- 'Deadly Calibre', (196-), Bison Western, Number 199, Cleveland Publishing, Sydney, Australia.
- 'Dean Takes Over', (196-), Bison Western, Number 142, Cleveland Publishing, Sydney, Australia.
- 'Death Rides Double', (196-), Arizona Western, Number 127, Cleveland Publishing, Sydney, Australia.
- 'Decision at Laramie' (196-), Coronado Western, Number 954, Cleveland Publishing, Sydney, Australia.
- 'Deputy', (195-), Chisholm Western, Number 667, Cleveland Publishing, Sydney, Australia.
- 'Deputy of Death', (1967), Cleveland Western, Number 1301, Cleveland Publishing, Sydney, Australia.
- 'Desperate Frontier', (196-), High Brand Western, Number 220, Cleveland Publishing, Sydney, Australia.
- 'Diablo Six Gun', (196-), Bison Western, Number 123, Cleveland Publishing, Sydney, Australia.
- 'Don't Bury Me Yet', (1987), Top Hand Western, Number 332, Cleveland Publishing, Sydney, Australia.
- 'Don't Push Your Luck', (1975), Lobo Western, Number 306, Cleveland Publishing, Sydney, Australia.
- 'Drygulcher's Doom', (196-), Pinto Western, Number 422, Cleveland Publishing, Sydney, Australia.
- 'Dudes Sometimes Dare', (196-), Cleveland Western, Number 1232, Cleveland Publishing, Sydney, Australia.
- 'Edge of Eden', (196-), Raw Hide Western, Number 432, Cleveland Publishing, Sydney, Australia.
- 'Everyone's Gunning for Gabriel', (1975), Winchester Western, Number 252, Cleveland Publishing, Sydney, Australia.
- 'False Law', (196-), Coronado Western, Number 980, Cleveland Publishing, Sydney, Australia.
- 'Fight or Run', (196-), Cleveland Western, Number 1624, Cleveland Publishing, Sydney, Australia.
- 'Flash Gannon', (195-), Chisholm Westerns, Number 651, Cleveland Publishing, Sydney, Australia.
- 'Fools Carve Notches', (196-), Rawhide Western, Number 431, Cleveland Publishing, Sydney, Australia.
- 'Godspeed', (1972), Bison Western, Number 622, Cleveland Publishing, Sydney, Australia.
- 'Goldplated Maverick', (196-), Bobcat Western, Number 130, Cleveland Publishing, Sydney, Australia.
- 'Gun Crazy Town', (196-), Arizona Western, Number 117, Cleveland Publishing, Sydney, Australia.
- 'Gun Creed', (196-), Bobcat Western, Number 124, Cleveland Publishing, Sydney, Australia.
- 'Gun Dean', (195-), Chisholm Western, Number 668, Cleveland Publishing, Sydney, Australia.
- 'Gun Elect', (196-), Sierra Western, Number 448, Cleveland Publishing, Sydney, Australia.
- 'Gun for a Deputy', (195-), Big Horn Western, Number 306, Cleveland Publishing, Sydney, Australia.
- 'Gun Gospellers', (1966), Condor Western, Number 194, Cleveland Publishing, Sydney, Australia.
- 'Gun Kid', (195-), Chisholm Western, Number 664, Cleveland Publishing, Sydney, Australia.
- 'Gun Prod', (196-), Sierra Western, Number 439, Cleveland Publishing, Sydney, Australia.
- 'Gun Ranny', (1971), Coronado Western, Number 1022, Cleveland Publishing, Sydney, Australia.
- 'Gun Shy', (196-), Sierra Western, Number 423, Cleveland Publishing, Sydney, Australia.
- 'Gun Stampede', (196-), Arizona Western, Number 137, Cleveland Publishing, Sydney, Australia.
- 'Gun Storm', (195-), Chisholm Western, Number 672, Cleveland Publishing, Sydney, Australia.
- 'Gun Without Mercy' (196-), Winchester Western, Number 735, Cleveland Publishing, Sydney, Australia.
- 'Gunfight on Main', (196-), Bison Western, Number 114, Cleveland Publishing, Sydney, Australia.
- 'Gunman's Altar', (196-), Top Hand Western, Number 131, Cleveland Publishing, Sydney, Australia.
- 'Gunplay to Eternity', (196-), Bison Western, Number 301, Cleveland Publishing, Sydney, Australia.
- 'Guns from Out of the Sun', (196-), Cleveland Western, Number 1019, Cleveland Publishing, Sydney, Australia.
- 'Gunsight Showdown', (196-), Sierra Western, Number 433, Cleveland Publishing, Sydney, Australia.
- 'Gun-Smart', (196-), Bison Western, Number 109, Cleveland Publishing, Sydney, Australia.
- 'Gunsmoke Terror', (195-), Bison Western, Number 170, Cleveland Publishing, Sydney, Australia.
- 'Gunther's Noose', (196-), Santa Fe Western, Number 355, Cleveland Publishing, Sydney, Australia.
- 'Had My Fill of Hate', (2017), Bison Western, Number 1587, Cleveland Publishing, Sydney, Australia.
- 'Hang a Dead Man', (1966), Santa Fe Western, Number 343, Cleveland Publishing, Sydney, Australia.
- 'Hard as Nails', (196-), Phoenix Western, Number 350, Cleveland Publishing, Sydney, Australia.
- 'Hate Filled Holster', (196-), Winchester Western, Number 727, Cleveland Publishing, Sydney, Australia.
- 'Hellion for Hire', (196-), Arizona Western, Number 118, Cleveland Publishing, Sydney, Australia.
- 'Hell's Acre', (197-), Phoenix Western, Number 315, Cleveland Publishing, Sydney, Australia.
- 'Hell's Hireling', (196-), Sierra Western, Number 456, Cleveland Publishing, Sydney, Australia.
- 'Here Lies a Loser', (1967), Bison Western, Number 434, Cleveland Publishing, Sydney, Australia.
- 'Heritage of Hate', (196-), Coronado Western, Number 934, Cleveland Publishing, Sydney, Australia.
- 'Hero's Hell', (195-), Big Horn Western, Number 320, Cleveland Publishing, Sydney, Australia.
- 'High Noon Corral', (196-), Coronado Western, Number 979, Cleveland Publishing, Sydney, Australia.
- 'Hold it, Mister!', (1970), Cleveland Western, Number 1249, Cleveland Publishing, Sydney, Australia.
- 'I Will Stand!', (1976), Winchester Western, Number 260, Cleveland Publishing, Sydney, Australia.
- 'In a Jackal's Dust', (1974), Bison Western, Number 655, Cleveland Publishing, Sydney, Australia.
- 'Invitation to Boot Hill', (196-), Cleveland Western, Number 1401, Cleveland Publishing, Sydney, Australia.
- 'Iron Man', (196-), Coronado Western, Number 964, Cleveland Publishing, Sydney, Australia.
- 'Johnny Lobo', (196-), Santa Fe Western, Number 300, Cleveland Publishing, Sydney, Australia.
- 'Johnny Revenge', (1966), Bison Western, Number 225, Cleveland Publishing, Sydney, Australia.
- 'Judge Not, Die Not!', (196-), Cleveland Western, Number 1451, Cleveland Publishing, Sydney, Australia.
- 'Kane', (196-), Coronado Western, Number 959, Cleveland Publishing, Sydney, Australia.
- 'Keep Off, Stranger', (196-), Arizona Western, Number 125, Cleveland Publishing, Sydney, Australia.
- 'Keep Shootin', (196-), Bison Western, Number 112, Cleveland Publishing, Sydney, Australia.
- 'Lanny Shan', (196-), Winchester Western, Number 809, Cleveland Publishing, Sydney, Australia.
- 'Last of the Tancreds', (1974), Pinto Western, Number 493, Cleveland Publishing, Sydney, Australia.
- 'Law for Hire', (195-), Big Horn Western, Number 330, Cleveland Publishing, Sydney, Australia.
- 'Left-Handed Law', (196-), Santa Fe Western, Number 318, Cleveland Publishing, Sydney, Australia.
- 'Long Trail of Diablo', (1970), Cleveland Classic, Number 98, Cleveland Publishing, Sydney, Australia.
- 'Lorimer's Day', (196-), Santa Fe Western, Number 361, Cleveland Publishing, Sydney, Australia.
- 'Man Behind the Gun', (196-), Bobcat Western, Number 154, Cleveland Publishing, Sydney, Australia.
- 'Man from Boot Hill', (196-), Bison Western, Number 164, Cleveland Publishing, Sydney, Australia.
- 'Man on His Own', (196-), Santa Fe Western, Number 337, Cleveland Publishing, Sydney, Australia.
- 'Mean Town', (196-), Coronado Western, Number 961, Cleveland Publishing, Sydney, Australia.
- 'Mister Big Gun', (196-), Bobcat Western, Number 125, Cleveland Publishing, Sydney, Australia.
- 'Mister Fast Gun', (195-), Chisholm Western, Number 663, Cleveland Publishing, Sydney, Australia.
- 'Mister, You Got Trouble', (197-), Arizona Western, Number 327, Cleveland Publishing, Sydney, Australia.
- 'Mourn the Valiant', (196-), Chisholm Western, Number 683, Cleveland Publishing, Sydney, Australia.
- 'Move on Deputy!', (195-), Big Horn Western, Number 308, Cleveland Publishing, Sydney, Australia.
- 'Never Back Down', (1975), Classic Western, Number 387, Cleveland Publishing, Sydney, Australia.
- 'Night Hawk', (196-), Sierra Western, Number 425, Cleveland Publishing, Sydney, Australia.
- 'None But the Fast', (196-), Sierra Western, Number 452, Cleveland Publishing, Sydney, Australia.
- 'Notches Along the Trail', (1966), Cleveland Western, Number 1238, Cleveland Publishing, Sydney, Australia.
- 'Notch-Hunter's Territory', (196-), Cleveland Western, Number 2254, Cleveland Publishing, Sydney, Australia.
- 'Notch-Hunter's Territory', (1991), Bison Western, Number 1025, Cleveland Publishing, Sydney, Australia.
- 'One Bullet, No More!', (1975), Classic Western, Number 370, Cleveland Publishing, Sydney, Australia.
- 'One Notch Too Many', (196-), Winchester Western, Number 782, Cleveland Publishing, Sydney, Australia.
- 'One Notch, One Noose', (196-), Pinto Western, Number 438, Cleveland Publishing, Sydney, Australia.
- 'Outlaw', (196-), Rawhide Western, Number 412, Cleveland Publishing, Sydney, Australia.
- 'Outlaw Country', (196-), Bobcat Western, Number 132, Cleveland Publishing, Sydney, Australia.
- 'Outlaw Justice', (196-), Bison Western, Number 117, Cleveland Publishing, Sydney, Australia.
- 'Owlhoot Decoy', (196-), Rawhide Western, Number 428, Cleveland Publishing, Sydney, Australia.
- 'Posse of the Damned', (196-), Rawhide Western, Number 457, Cleveland Publishing, Sydney, Australia.
- 'Preferably Dead', (196-), Chisholm Western, Number 685, Cleveland Publishing, Sydney, Australia.
- 'Proud Exile', (196-), Sierra Western, Number 445, Cleveland Publishing, Sydney, Australia.
- 'Raiders Yonder', (196-), Bison Western, Number 443, Cleveland Publishing, Sydney, Australia.
- 'Return to Laredo', (1974), Classic Western, Number 133, Cleveland Publishing, Sydney, Australia.
- 'Ride Any Trail', (1971), Bison Western, Number 608, Cleveland Publishing, Sydney, Australia.
- 'Ride or Hang', (196-), Arizona Western, Number 199, Cleveland Publishing, Sydney, Australia.
- 'Ride Roughshod', (196-), Chisholm Western, Number 680, Cleveland Publishing, Sydney, Australia.
- 'Ride Vaquero', (196-), Sierra Western, Number 441, Cleveland Publishing, Sydney, Australia.
- 'Sam Colby...Deceased', (197-), Peacemaker Western, Number 214, Cleveland Publishing, Sydney, Australia.
- 'Sam Harmon is Back!', (1979), Classic Western, Number 395, Cleveland Publishing, Sydney, Australia.
- 'Sam Houston is Back!', (197-), Cleveland Western, Number 1673, Cleveland Publishing, Sydney, Australia.
- 'Satan and a Gun', (196-), Bison Western, Number 221, Cleveland Publishing, Sydney, Australia.
- 'Savage Steel', (196-), Rawhide Western, Number 423, Cleveland Publishing, Sydney, Australia.
- 'Send for Blain', (196-), Condor Western, number 229, Cleveland Publishing, Sydney, Australia.
- 'Shoot to Kill', (196-), Condor Western, Number 125, Cleveland Publishing, Sydney, Australia.
- 'Short Walk to Boothill', (196-), Bison Western, Number 185, Cleveland Publishing, Sydney, Australia.
- 'Six-Gun Stampede', (196-), Santa Fe Western, Number 305, Cleveland Publishing, Sydney, Australia.
- 'Sons of Sin', (1966), Phoenix Western, Number 314, Cleveland Publishing, Sydney, Australia.
- 'Stacked Deck', (195-), Chisholm Western, Number 650, Cleveland Publishing, Sydney, Australia.
- 'Tehane's Territory', (1976), Iron Horse Western, Number 287, Cleveland Publishing, Sydney, Australia.
- 'Thane Dusang', (196-), Condor Western, Number 184, Cleveland Publishing, Sydney, Australia.
- 'The 11th Commandment', (196-), Cleveland Western, Number 1652, Cleveland Publishing, Sydney, Australia.
- 'The Back Shooter', (196-), Rawhide Western, Number 419, Cleveland Publishing, Sydney, Australia.
- 'The Bounty Man', (1975), Classic Western, Number 369, Cleveland Publishing, Sydney, Australia.
- 'The Curse', (196-), Top Hand Western, Number 219, Cleveland Publishing, Sydney, Australia.
- 'The Curse of Bade Alroe', (196-), Cleveland Western, Number 1233, Cleveland Publishing, Sydney, Australia.
- 'The Deadman's Hand', (198-), High Brand Western, Number 320, Cleveland Publishing, Sydney, Australia.
- 'The Delinquent Gun', (196-), Condor Western, Number 159, Cleveland Publishing, Sydney, Australia.
- 'The Devil's Acres', (1974), Classic Western, Number 171, Cleveland Publishing, Sydney, Australia.
- 'The Executioner', (1975), Phoenix Western, Number 299, Cleveland Publishing, Sydney, Australia.
- 'The Gun Fight', (196-), Condor Western, Number 166, Cleveland Publishing, Sydney, Australia.
- 'The Gunpackers', (197-), Big Horn Western, Number 364, Cleveland Publishing, Sydney, Australia.
- 'The Guns of Gideon', (1976), Classic Western, Number 373, Cleveland Publishing, Sydney, Australia.
- 'The Guthrie Guns', (1970), Bobcat Western, Number 335, Cleveland Publishing, Sydney, Australia.
- 'The Hotter Side of Hell', (1983), Bison Western, Number 935, Cleveland Publishing, Sydney, Australia.
- 'The Hungry Gun', (1973), Tumble Weed Western, Number 241, Cleveland Publishing, Sydney, Australia.
- 'The Hunt - and the Kill', (1973), Classic Western, Number 293, Cleveland Publishing, Sydney, Australia.
- 'The Judas', (196-), Coronado Western, Number 955, Cleveland Publishing, Sydney, Australia.
- 'The Last Guntrail', (196-), Sierra Western, Number 431, Cleveland Publishing, Sydney, Australia.
- 'The Last Shell', (196-), Santa Fe Western, Number 321, Cleveland Publishing, Sydney, Australia.
- 'The Limbo Trail', (1970), Cleveland Classic, Number 76, Cleveland Publishing, Sydney, Australia.
- 'The Man Behind the Gun', (196-), Bobcat Western, Number 154, Cleveland Publishing, Sydney, Australia.
- 'The Outlaw', (196-), Condor Western, Number 158, Cleveland Publishing, Sydney, Australia.
- 'The Peace Officer', (196-), Chisholm Western, Number 684, Cleveland Publishing, Sydney, Australia.
- 'The Price of Notches', (196-), Bison Western, Number 304, Cleveland Publishing, Sydney, Australia.
- 'The Requiem Trail', (196-), Santa Fe Western, Number 342, Cleveland Publishing, Sydney, Australia.
- 'The Star Target', (196-), Sierra Western, Number 424, Cleveland Publishing, Sydney, Australia.
- 'The Sundown Man', (1975), Classic Western, Number 387, Cleveland Publishing, Sydney, Australia.
- 'The Third Gun', (196-), Arizona Western, Number 105, Cleveland Publishing, Sydney, Australia.
- 'The Valiant Die', (196-), American Wild West, Number 29, Cleveland Publishing, Sydney, Australia.
- 'The Wild Bunch', (196-), Pinto Western, Number 409, Cleveland Publishing, Sydney, Australia.
- 'The Will of Isaac Dockery', (1976), Classic Western, Number 345, Cleveland Publishing, Sydney, Australia.
- 'The Young Gun', (196-), Coronado Western, Number 945, Cleveland Publishing, Sydney, Australia.
- 'They'll Come a Day', (197-), Pinto Western, Number 519, Cleveland Publishing, Sydney, Australia.
- 'Time to Kill', (1972), Classic Western, Number 393, Cleveland Publishing, Sydney, Australia.
- 'Tin Star Target', (196-), Sierra Western, Number 424, Cleveland Publishing, Sydney, Australia.
- 'Tombstone Testament', (1970), Peacemaker Western, Number 296, Cleveland Publishing, Sydney, Australia.
- 'Two for the Tall Tree', (1976), Classic Western, Number 342, Cleveland Publishing, Sydney, Australia.
- 'Walk Tall', (196-), Bobcat Western, Number 021, Cleveland Publishing, Sydney, Australia.
- 'Wear the Brand', (1976), Classic Western, Number 373, Cleveland Publishing, Sydney, Australia.
- 'When Tyler Came to Town', (196-), Bison Western, Number 294, Cleveland Publishing, Sydney, Australia.
- 'Where the Eagle Rides', (197-), Peacemaker Western, Number 231, Cleveland Publishing, Sydney, Australia.
- 'Why Hang Shanahan?', (1978), High Brand Western, Number 327, Cleveland Publishing, Sydney, Australia.
- 'Wild Gun', (1967), Arizona Western, Number 231, Cleveland Publishing, Sydney, Australia.
- 'Winchester '73', (196-), Sierra Western, Number 422, Cleveland Publishing, Sydney, Australia.
- 'Winchester Decision', (195-), Big Horn Western, Number 329, Cleveland Publishing, Sydney, Australia.
- 'You Asked for It!', (1998), Cleveland Western, Number 2568, Cleveland Publishing, Sydney, Australia.
- 'Your'e Buyin' Trouble, (196-), Chisholm Western, Number 742, Cleveland Publishing, Sydney, Australia.

Dunn's publications as Gunn Halliday include:

- 'A Bullet Waited', (196-), Winchester Western, Number 726, Cleveland Publishing, Sydney, Australia.
- 'A Bullet's Amen', (196-), Top Hand Western, Number 247, Cleveland Publishing, Sydney, Australia.
- 'A Town Without Law', (1970), Phoenix Western, Number 280, Cleveland Publishing, Sydney, Australia.
- 'Arizona Kid', (196-), Bobcat Western, Number 162, Cleveland Publishing, Sydney, Australia.
- 'Back Down, Mister', (196-), Bison Western, Number 158, Cleveland Publishing, Sydney, Australia.
- 'Bad Breed', (196-), Top Hand Western, Number 223, Cleveland Publishing, Sydney, Australia.
- 'Badge, Gun and Holder', (196-), Bison Western, Number 205, Cleveland Publishing, Sydney, Australia.
- 'Badge Without a Claim', (196-), Bison Western, Number 320, Cleveland Publishing, Sydney, Australia.
- 'Bannon', (197-), Cleveland Western, Number 1352, Cleveland Publishing, Sydney, Australia.
- 'Be Told!', (1975), Classic Western, Number 380, Cleveland Publishing, Sydney, Australia.
- 'Blood Colt", (195-), Chisholm Western, Number 662, Cleveland Publishing, Sydney, Australia.
- 'Boothill Justice', (196-), Coronado Western, Number 973, Cleveland Publishing, Sydney, Australia.
- 'Bound for Boothill', (197-), Bobcat Western, Number 192, Cleveland Publishing, Sydney, Australia.
- 'Bounty in Notches', (196-), Winchester Western, Number 765, Cleveland Publishing, Sydney, Australia.
- 'Brace Strang', (196-), Bison Western, Number 163, Cleveland Publishing, Sydney, Australia.
- 'Brad Kane', (196-), Arizona Western, Number 114, Cleveland Publishing, Sydney, Australia.
- 'Brand of a Badman', (1967), Arizona Western, Number 265, Cleveland Publishing, Sydney, Australia.
- 'Bullet Judgement', (196-), Sierra Western, Number 451, Cleveland Publishing, Sydney, Australia.
- 'Burn the Brand Deep', (196-), Bobcat Western, Number 198, Cleveland Publishing, Sydney, Australia.
- 'Challenge at Cannon Ridge', (196-), Condor Western, Number 203, Cleveland Publishing, Sydney, Australia.
- 'Cimarron Kid', (195-), Chisholm Western, Number 661, Cleveland Publishing, Sydney, Australia.
- 'Clage Colard', (196-), Coronado Western, Number 970, Cleveland Publishing, Sydney, Australia.
- 'Cordite Trail', (196-), Pinto Western, Number 424, Cleveland Publishing, Sydney, Australia.
- 'Cry Rope', (196-), Condor Western, Number 192, Cleveland Publishing, Sydney, Australia.
- 'Danton's Day', (196-), Cleveland Western, Number 1578, Cleveland Publishing, Sydney, Australia.
- 'Dead of Alive', (196-), Coronado Western, Number 949, Cleveland Publishing, Sydney, Australia.
- 'Death Rides its Own Trail', (196-), Bobcat Western, Number 278, Cleveland Publishing, Sydney, Australia.
- 'Devil's Playground', (196-), Pinto Western, Number 429, Cleveland Publishing, Sydney, Australia.
- 'Devil's Tie Rope', (1975), Cleveland Western, Number 1985, Cleveland Publishing, Sydney, Australia.
- 'Duane', (196-), Pinto Western, Number 468, Cleveland Publishing, Sydney, Australia.
- 'Everywhere Thunder', (1973), Bison Western, Number 636, Cleveland Publishing, Sydney, Australia.
- 'Fear Fever', (196-), Sierra Western, Number 428, Cleveland Publishing, Sydney, Australia.
- 'Feud at Pardon Point', (196-), Peacemaker Western, Number 180, Cleveland Publishing, Sydney, Australia.
- 'Fightin' Man', (196-), Arizona Western, Number 141, Cleveland Publishing, Sydney, Australia.
- 'First Bullet Counts', (196-), Chisholm Western, Number 695, Cleveland Publishing, Sydney, Australia.
- 'First Notch', (196-), Coronado Western, Number 952, Cleveland Publishing, Sydney, Australia.
- 'Gamble or Die', (196-), Bison Western, Number 156, Cleveland Publishing, Sydney, Australia.
- 'Gun Decision', (196-), Condor Western, Number 183, Cleveland Publishing, Sydney, Australia.
- 'Gun Rebel', (196-), Bison Western, Number 191, Cleveland Publishing, Sydney, Australia.
- 'Gun Thunder', (196-), Big Horn Western, Number 325, Cleveland Publishing, Sydney, Australia.
- 'Gunman's Gamble', (196-), Peacemaker Western, Number 162, Cleveland Publishing, Sydney, Australia.
- 'Guns of Cimarron', (196-), Bison Western, Number 155, Cleveland Publishing, Sydney, Australia.
- 'Guns of Hell's Country', (196-), Arizona Western, Number 237, 237, Cleveland Publishing, Sydney, Australia.
- 'Guns on Main Street', (197-), Bison Western, Number 308, Cleveland Publishing, Sydney, Australia.
- 'Gunslinger', (197-), Phoenix Western, Number 342, Cleveland Publishing, Sydney, Australia.
- 'Gunsmoke Legacy' (1967), Coronado Western, Number 991, Cleveland Publishing, Sydney, Australia.
- 'Hard Trail to Destiny', (1966), Coronado Western, Number 975, Cleveland Publishing, Sydney, Australia.
- 'Hate Dies Hard', (196-), Arizona Western, Number 126, Cleveland Publishing, Sydney, Australia.
- 'Heroes Die Fast', (196-), Condor Western, Number 164, Cleveland Publishing, Sydney, Australia.
- 'High Stakes', (196-), Condor Western, Number 172, Cleveland Publishing, Sydney, Australia.
- 'Hostage', (196-), Sierra Western, Number 462, Cleveland Publishing, Sydney, Australia.
- 'I Want Him Dead!', (1970), Bobcat Western, Number 339, Cleveland Publishing, Sydney, Australia.
- 'Impatient Gun', (195-), Big Horn Western, Number 319, Cleveland Publishing, Sydney, Australia.
- 'Just One More Notch', (1975), Lobo Western, Number 304, Cleveland Publishing, Sydney, Australia.
- 'Keep Driftin'', (196-), High Brand Western, Number 233, Cleveland Publishing, Sydney, Australia.
- 'Killer's Destiny', (196-), Top Hand Western, Number 261, Cleveland Publishing, Sydney, Australia.
- 'Last Stand Corral', (196-), Coronado Western, Number 976, Cleveland Publishing, Sydney, Australia.
- 'Lead Creased', (196-), Coronado Western, Number 953, Cleveland Publishing, Sydney, Australia.
- 'Litany for Losers', (196-), Santa Fe Western, Number 341, Cleveland Publishing, Sydney, Australia.
- 'Lobo Law Man', (196-), Bison Western, Number 218, Cleveland Publishing, Sydney, Australia.
- 'Loner with a Badge', (196-), Cleveland Western, Number 1234, Cleveland Publishing, Sydney, Australia.
- 'Loners Five', (196-), Bison Western, Number 483, Cleveland Publishing, Sydney, Australia.
- 'Loner's Limbo', (196-), Rawhide Western, Number 438, Cleveland Publishing, Sydney, Australia.
- 'Lynch Law' (196-), Pinto Western, Number 445, Cleveland Publishing, Sydney, Australia.
- 'Mark of a Man', (1971), Bison Western, Number 846, Cleveland Publishing, Sydney, Australia.
- 'Maverick Thunder', (196-), Big Horn Western, Number 332, Cleveland Publishing, Sydney, Australia.
- 'Nailed', (195-), Chisholm Western, Number 670, Cleveland Publishing, Sydney, Australia.
- 'Never a Quitter', (1975), Winchester Western, Number 255, Cleveland Publishing, Sydney, Australia.
- 'No Jury', (196-), Sierra Western, Number 450, Cleveland Publishing, Sydney, Australia.
- 'No Trail for Innocents', (197-), Top Hand Western, Number 311, Cleveland Publishing, Sydney, Australia.
- 'Not Without Hate', (196-), Big Horn Western, Number 337, Cleveland Publishing, Sydney, Australia.
- 'One Man - Two Shadows', (196-), High Brand Western, Number 232, Cleveland Publishing, Sydney, Australia.
- 'Outlaw Maverick', (196-), Sierra Western, Number 429, Cleveland Publishing, Sydney, Australia.
- 'Peace Day in Calamity', (196-), Big Horn Western, Number 340, Cleveland Publishing, Sydney, Australia.
- 'Quest for a Killer', (196-), Santa Fe Western, Number 320, Cleveland Publishing, Sydney, Australia.
- 'Range Boss', (196-), Santa Fe Western, Number 313, Cleveland Publishing, Sydney, Australia.
- 'Ride Like Hell', (196-), Bison Western, Number 233, Cleveland Publishing, Sydney, Australia.
- 'Ridin' Drag', (196-), Pinto Western, Number 412, Cleveland Publishing, Sydney, Australia.
- 'Riot an Rainbow Ridge', (1967), Arizona Western, Number 238, Cleveland Publishing, Sydney, Australia.
- 'Saddle Savage', (195-), Chisholm Western, Number 671, Cleveland Publishing, Sydney, Australia.
- 'Sagebrush Showdown', (196-), Bison Western, Number 254, Cleveland Publishing, Sydney, Australia.
- 'Satan's Challenge', (196-), Peacemaker Western, Number 184, Cleveland Publishing, Sydney, Australia.
- 'Satan's Outcast', (196-), Bison Western, Number 295, Cleveland Publishing, Sydney, Australia.
- 'Scars of Fury', (196-), Cleveland Western, Number 1237, Cleveland Publishing, Sydney, Australia.
- 'Six-Gun Lobo', (196-), Top Hand Western, Number 201, Cleveland Publishing, Sydney, Australia.
- 'Some Kill, Some Die', (1967), Arizona Western, Number 248, Cleveland Publishing, Sydney, Australia.
- 'Stopover at Boothill', (1975), Santa Fe Western, Number 412, Cleveland Publishing, Sydney, Australia.
- 'Sundown for Hellions', (1966), Big Horn Western, Number 339, Cleveland Publishing, Sydney, Australia.
- 'Tangle Fast', (196-), Coronado Western, Number 950, Cleveland Publishing, Sydney, Australia.
- 'The Damned and the Dead', (196-), Big Horn Western, Number 348, Cleveland Publishing, Sydney, Australia.
- 'The Day a Lawman Died', (196-), Cleveland Western, Number 1230, Cleveland Publishing, Sydney, Australia.
- 'The Fast Play', (195-), Big Horn Western, Number 315, Cleveland Publishing, Sydney, Australia.
- 'The Fast Rifle', (196-), Bison Western, Number 166, Cleveland Publishing, Sydney, Australia.
- 'The Fearless Gun', (196-), Bison Western, Number 160, Cleveland Publishing, Sydney, Australia.
- 'The Gun Travels North', (195-), Big Horn Western, Number 311, Cleveland Publishing, Sydney, Australia.
- 'The Hanging Man', (1969), Condor Western, Number 296, Cleveland Publishing, Sydney, Australia.
- 'The Hard Breed', (196-), High Brand Western, Number 249, Cleveland Publishing, Sydney, Australia.
- 'The Law of Lead', (196-), Santa Fe Western, Number 316, Cleveland Publishing, Sydney, Australia.
- 'The Lawman's Lead', (196-), Sierra Western, Number 430, Cleveland Publishing, Sydney, Australia.
- 'The Long Rope Incident', (196-), Winchester Western, Number 748, Cleveland Publishing, Sydney, Australia.
- 'The Man Who Came Back', (196-), Arizona Western, Number 748, Cleveland Publishing, Sydney, Australia.
- 'The Marshal's Gun', (196-), Sierra Western, Number 426, Cleveland Publishing, Sydney, Australia.
- 'The Searching Gun', (196-), Sierra Western, Number 427, Cleveland Publishing, Sydney, Australia.
- 'The Seventh Scar', (196-), Chisholm Western, Number 689, Cleveland Publishing, Sydney, Australia.
- 'The Wesley Bunch', (196-), Big Horn Western, Number 357, Cleveland Publishing, Sydney, Australia.
- 'The Young Hellion', (196-), Arizona Western, Number 192, Cleveland Publishing, Sydney, Australia.
- 'Three Graves', (196-), Coronado Western, Number 960, Cleveland Publishing, Sydney, Australia.
- 'Town for the Asking', (196-), Santa Fe Western, Number 331, Cleveland Publishing, Sydney, Australia.
- 'Town With No Law', (196-), Big Horn Western, Number 410, Cleveland Publishing, Sydney, Australia.
- 'Trail Scarred', (196-), Peacemaker Western, Number 186, Cleveland Publishing, Sydney, Australia.
- 'Two-Fisted Ramrod', (196-), Pinto Western, Number 428, Cleveland Publishing, Sydney, Australia.
- 'Walk Proud', (196-), Bob Cat Western, Number 142, Cleveland Publishing, Sydney, Australia.
- 'Warbag Breed', (1966), Arizona Western, Number 206, Cleveland Publishing, Sydney, Australia.
- 'Where Brands Don't Count', (196-), Bobcat Western, number 288, Cleveland Publishing, Sydney, Australia.
- 'Where Buzzards Feed', (196-), Pinto Western, Number 463, Cleveland Publishing, Sydney, Australia.
- 'Yellowstone', (196-), Rawhide Western, Number 414, Cleveland Publishing, Sydney, Australia.

Dunn's publications as Adam Brady include:

- 'Born to be Wild', (1973), Chisholm Western, Number 720, Cleveland Publishing, Sydney, Australia.
- 'Don't Send a Dude', (1981), Halliday Western, Number 13, Cleveland Publishing, Sydney, Australia.
- 'Drifter's Brand', (1980), Halliday Western, Number 10, Cleveland Publishing, Sydney, Australia.
- 'Fury of the .44', (1967), Cleveland Western, Number 2, Cleveland Publishing, Sydney, Australia.
- 'Halliday', (1967), Halliday Western, Number 1, Cleveland Publishing, Sydney, Australia.
- 'Name Your Bounty', (1973), Halliday Western, Number 7, Cleveland Publishing, Sydney, Australia.
- 'Put a Price On It!', (1982), Halliday Western, Number 17, Cleveland Publishing, Sydney, Australia.
- 'Ride for the Devil!', (1967), Bobcat Western, Number 295, Cleveland Publishing, Sydney, Australia.
- 'So Who's Arguin'?', (1982), Halliday Western, Number 16, Cleveland Publishing, Sydney, Australia.
- 'The Drifting Breed', (197-), Big Horn Western, Number 367, Cleveland Publishing, Sydney, Australia.
- 'The Final Flutter', (1974), Halliday Western, Number 9, Cleveland Publishing, Sydney, Australia.
- 'The Wayward Breed', (1981), Halliday Western, Number 12, Cleveland Publishing, Sydney, Australia.
- 'What'll It Be?', (1981), Halliday Western, Number 15, Cleveland Publishing, Sydney, Australia.
- 'Where Dust Won't Settle', (1980), Halliday Western, Number 14, Cleveland Publishing, Sydney, Australia.
- 'Why Men Die', (1967), Arizona Western, Number 294, Cleveland Publishing, Sydney, Australia.
- 'Why Not Hang Him?', (1981), Halliday Western, Number 11, Cleveland Publishing, Sydney, Australia.

Dunn's publications as Brett Iverson include:

- 'Back Trail to Hate', (1974), Arizona Western, Number 435, Cleveland Publishing, Sydney, Australia.
- 'Bible and Gun', (1967), Bison Western, Number 430, Cleveland Publishing, Sydney, Australia.
- 'Come Get Me!', (1958), Rawhide Western, Number 495, Cleveland Publishing, Sydney, Australia.
- 'Fool's Frontier', (196-), Cleveland Western, Number 990, Cleveland Publishing, Sydney, Australia.
- 'Guns from Out of the Sun', (1974), Cleveland Western, Number 127, Cleveland Publishing, Sydney, Australia.
- 'Hate Holds a Gun', (1958), Santa Fe Western, Number 393, Cleveland Publishing, Sydney, Australia.
- 'Jury Seven', (1976), Classic Western, Number 372, Cleveland Publishing, Sydney, Australia.
- 'No Shadows at Noon', (1965), Cleveland Western, Number 1026, Cleveland Publishing, Sydney, Australia.
- 'Outlaw's Bible', (1975), Arizona Western, Number 396, Cleveland Publishing, Sydney, Australia.
- 'Red River Crossing', (1975), Classic Western, Number 357, Cleveland Publishing, Sydney, Australia.

Dunn's publications as Matt Cregan include:

- 'A Killing at Quinto', (196-), Arizona Western, Number 178, Cleveland Publishing, Sydney, Australia.
- 'Big Man's Country', (196-), Santa Fe Western, Number 328, Cleveland Publishing, Sydney, Australia.
- 'Bounty for a Killer', (196-), Winchester Western, Number 763, Cleveland Publishing, Sydney, Australia.
- 'Code of Violence', (196-), Bison Western, Number 307, Cleveland Publishing, Sydney, Australia.
- 'Courage Wears a Star', (196-), Arizona Western, Number 115, Cleveland Publishing, Sydney, Australia.
- 'Coyotes Don't Rust', (196-), Condor Western, Number 156, Cleveland Publishing, Sydney, Australia.
- 'Deane', (196-), Raw Hide Western, Number 427, Cleveland Publishing, Sydney, Australia.
- 'Gun Scar', (196-), Condor Western, Number 176, Cleveland Publishing, Sydney, Australia.
- 'Hang High, Hang Long', (196-), Winchester Western, Number 764, Cleveland Publishing, Sydney, Australia.
- 'Homage to a Hellion', (196-), Arizona Western, Number 180, Cleveland Publishing, Sydney, Australia.
- 'Live High, Hang Long', (196-), Winchester Western, Number 764, Cleveland Publishing, Sydney, Australia.
- 'Mister Deputy', (196-), Bobcat Western, Number 111, Cleveland Publishing, Sydney, Australia.
- 'Showdown at Glory Creek', (196-), Condor Western, Number 207, Cleveland Publishing, Sydney, Australia.
- 'Stake-Out', (196-), Santa Fe Western, Number 324, Cleveland Publishing, Sydney, Australia.
- 'Stranger to Justice', (196-), Peacemaker Western, Number 210, Cleveland Publishing, Sydney, Australia.
- 'Sundown Mesa', (196-), Santa Fe Western, Number 736, Cleveland Publishing, Sydney, Australia.
- 'Tall Man's Code', (196-), Top Hand Western, Number 225, Cleveland Publishing, Sydney, Australia.
- 'The Gun Owl', (196-), Winchester Western, Number 732, Cleveland Publishing, Sydney, Australia.
- 'The Hole Card', (196-), Santa Fe Western, Number 301, Cleveland Publishing, Sydney, Australia.
- 'The Law of Hell', (196-), Bobcat Western, Number 103, Cleveland Publishing, Sydney, Australia.
- 'The Peace Star', (196-), Winchester Western, Number 734, Cleveland Publishing, Sydney, Australia.
- 'Time Out for Hanging', (196-), Coronado Western, Number 967, Cleveland Publishing, Sydney, Australia.
- 'Trail to Trouble', (196-), Top Hand Western, Number 227, Cleveland Publishing, Sydney, Australia.
- 'Two for Rope', (197-), Chisholm Western, Number 716, Cleveland Publishing, Sydney, Australia.

Dunn's publications as Sheldon B. Cole include:

- 'Boothill is Anywhere', (196-), Loner Western, Number 203, Cleveland Publishing, Sydney, Australia.
- 'Carne's Raiders', (1967), Pinto Western, Number 333, Cleveland Publishing, Sydney, Australia.
- 'Draw Fast - or Die', (196-), Loner Western, Number 213, Cleveland Publishing, Sydney, Australia.
- 'Firebrand Country', (1968), Loner Western, Number 225, Cleveland Publishing, Sydney, Australia.
- 'Gun for Gun', (196-), Loner Western, Number 222, Cleveland Publishing, Sydney, Australia.
- 'Kill or Hang!', (1967), Loner Western, Number 4, Cleveland Publishing, Sydney, Australia.
- 'Losers Don't Count', (1970), High Brand Western, Number 336, Cleveland Publishing, Sydney, Australia.
- 'Mask of a Man', (1980), Peacemaker Western, Number 288, Cleveland Publishing, Sydney, Australia.
- 'Name the Stakes', (196-), Loner Western, Number 226, Cleveland Publishing, Sydney, Australia.
- 'Only One Survives', (196-), Top Hand Western, Number 336, Cleveland Publishing, Sydney, Australia.
- 'Outcast Country', (196-), Loner Western, Number 206, Cleveland Publishing, Sydney, Australia.
- 'Somewhere - a Showdown', (198-), Sierra Western, Number 547, Cleveland Publishing, Sydney, Australia.
- 'Sundown comes Suddenly', (196-), Rawhide Western, Number 535, Cleveland Publishing, Sydney, Australia.
- 'The Buzzards are Gathering', (196-), Loner Western, Number 224, Cleveland Publishing, Sydney, Australia.
- 'The Guns of Gabriel', (196-), Loner Western, Number 218, Cleveland Publishing, Sydney, Australia.
- 'The Memory Trail', (1971), Loner Western, Number 18, Cleveland Publishing, Sydney, Australia.
- 'The Testament Trail', (196-), Loner Western, Number 214, Cleveland Publishing, Sydney, Australia.
- 'Where Guns Talk', (1967), Loner Western, Number 405, Cleveland Publishing, Sydney, Australia.

Dunn's publications as Walt Renwick include:

- 'Death Decides', (196-), Bison Western, Number 152, Cleveland Publishing, Sydney, Australia.
- 'Decide and Die', (196-), Bison Western, Number 152, Cleveland Publishing, Sydney, Australia.
- 'Draw, Damn You!, (196-), Pinto Western, Number 456, Cleveland Publishing, Sydney, Australia.
- 'Drop In, or Die!', (197-), Iron Horse Western, Number 292, Cleveland Publishing, Sydney, Australia.
- 'Gun Whipped', (196-), Sierra Western, Number 414, Cleveland Publishing, Sydney, Australia.
- 'He Came Back to Kill', (196-), Bison Western, Number 144, Cleveland Publishing, Sydney, Australia.
- 'Killers Three', (196-), Arizona Western, Number 171, Cleveland Publishing, Sydney, Australia.
- 'No Stranger to Trouble', (1967), Bison Western, Number 489, Cleveland Publishing, Sydney, Australia.
- 'Outlaw Medic' (196-), Top Hand Western, Number 224, Cleveland Publishing, Sydney, Australia.
- 'Reach Out - and Take', (196-), Peacemaker Western, Number 183, Cleveland Publishing, Sydney, Australia.
- 'The Hate of Rico Dean', (1960), Cleveland Classic, Number 204, Cleveland Publishing, Sydney, Australia.
- 'The Last Raw Hell', (196-), Pinto Western, Number 427, Cleveland Publishing, Sydney, Australia.
- 'The Losers', (196-), Santa Fe Western, Number 354, Cleveland Publishing, Sydney, Australia.
- 'The Wide Spread', (196-), Bobcat Western, Number 106, Cleveland Publishing, Sydney, Australia.

Dunn's publications as Morgan Culp include:

- 'Clem Dussard', (196-), Sundown Western, Number 1733, Cleveland Publishing, Sydney, Australia.
- 'Fargo', (196-), Fargo Classic Western, Number 1, Cleveland Publishing, Sydney, Australia.
- 'In for the Kill', (1983), The Avenger, Number 3, Cleveland Publishing, Sydney, Australia.
- 'Jay Ramon', (196-), Sundown Western, Number 1725, Cleveland Publishing, Sydney, Australia.
- 'Just Short of Hell', (1983), The Avenger, Number 2, Cleveland Publishing, Sydney, Australia.
- 'Tag Klein', (196-), Sundown Western, Number 1717, Cleveland Publishing, Sydney, Australia.
- 'The Avenger', (1983), The Avenger, Number 1, Cleveland Publishing, Sydney, Australia.
- 'The Faraday Brand', (1979), Sundown Western, Number 1741, Cleveland Publishing, Sydney, Australia.
