= Cleveland Publishing =

Australian publishing company

Cleveland Publishing was an Australian digest paperback fiction publishing company that operated between 1953 and 2019. The company was originally based at 276 Military Road, Cremorne, New South Wales.

== History ==
The company's founder was John Patrick 'Jack' Atkins – a former secretary of the New South Wales Democratic Labor Party. Les Atkins – John Atkin's son – took control of the company in 1979.

Cleveland Publishing published novellas (24,000 to 48,000 words) in a number of genres. At peak the company produced 18 titles – 12 originals and six reprints – per month. Print runs for individual titles peaked at 25,000 copies. In all, close to 10,000 titles were published.

The genres published included crime, romance, war and westerns. The first three genre titles that were published under a number of series included: the Detective series, the Larry Kent series & the Silhouette Detective series.

Other series that were published: the Enchanting series, the Diamond Library series, the Doctors and Nurses series, the Doctor Riley series, the Doctor Conway series, the Frontline series, the Raider series, the Commando series and the Patrol series.

== Westerns ==
The western genre was the company's mainstay product and included the following series:

- American Wild West
- Arizona Western
- The Avenger
- Big Horn Western
- Bison Western
- Bobcat Western
- Chisholm Western
- Classic Western
- Cleveland Western
- Condor Western
- Coronado Western
- Dollar Western
- Fighting Western
- Halliday Western
- High Brand Western
- Iron Horse Western
- Legends of the West
- Lobo Western
- Loner Western
- Peacemaker Western
- Phoenix Western
- Pinto Western
- Rawhide Western
- Santa Fe Western
- Sierra Western
- Sundown Western
- Texas Western
- Top Hand Western
- Tumbleweed Western
- Winchester Western

Authors that contributed significantly to the western genre included:

- Des Dunn
- Roger Green
- Keith Hetherington
- Richard Wilkes-Hunter
- Len Meares
- Paul Wheelahan

Each author was published under a number of pseudonyms.
