= Ben Raab =

American writer and producer

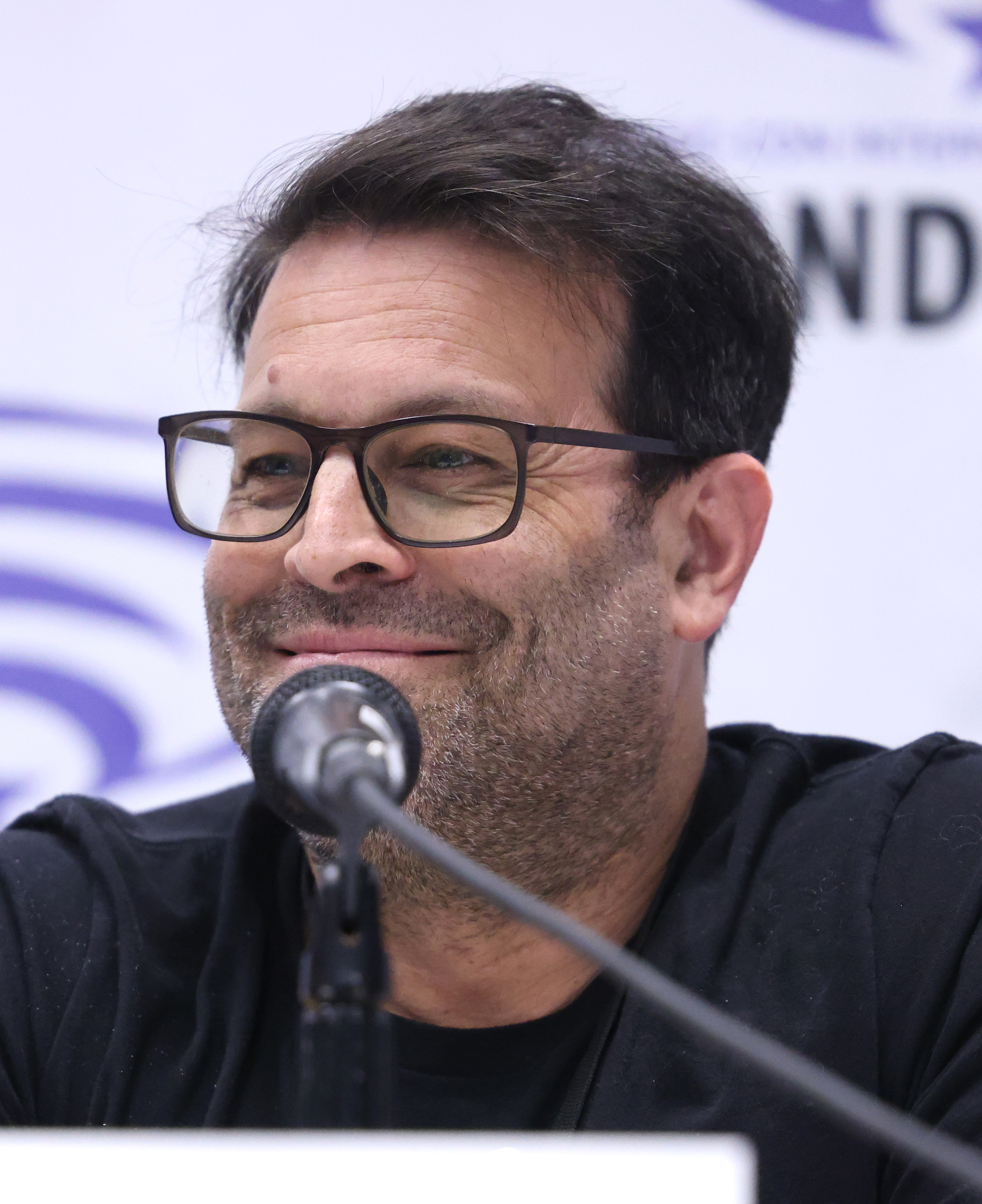
- Raab in 2026
- Born: Benjamin Raab; October 13, 1970 (age 56) New York City, New York
- Areas: Writer, Editor

Benjamin Raab (born October 13, 1970, in New York City, New York) is an American screenwriter, television producer, comic book writer and editor.

== Early life ==
Raab is a native of Cedarhurst, New York, and attended Lawrence High School. He graduated from the University of Michigan in 1992 with a bachelor's degree in English Literature and Composition.

== Career ==
Raab made his Marvel debut as an interviewer for artist Gary Kwapisz in Marvel Age Special: The Punisher Anniversary Magazine. In the letters section of X-Men vol. 2 #31, Raab was announced as the new assistant editor on X-Men books edited by Bob Harras, receiving that credit on several titles cover-dated April 1994 to September 1996, including X-Men, Uncanny X-Men, Wolverine, X-Force and Generation X. During that time, Raab also joined New York University's Stan-hattan Project. Administered by his editorial colleague James Felder, the project sought out and trained potential comic book writers.

Written work by Raab includes stints on The Phantom (both for Moonstone Books and Scandinavian publisher Egmont) and Excalibur (vol. 1 and 2) as well as the second of volume of X-Men/Alpha Flight and Union Jack with artist John Cassaday for Marvel Comics. For DC Comics, Raab penned a number of issues on Green Lantern following Judd Winick's run, co-wrote several Teen Titans-centric short stories and mini-series with Geoff Johns as well as The Human Race mini-series, the Elseworlds one-shot JLA: Shogun of Steel and several titles for the Wildstorm imprint. Later work includes the four-issue series Living in Infamy for Ludovico Technique, co-written with Deric A. Hughes, and the 96-page graphic novel The Phantom: Legacy, a retelling of the character's origin. In 2009, Raab served as the editor for The Phantom: Ghost Who Walks series by Moonstone Books. In 2012, Raab and artist Pat Quinn began self-publishing their 8-issue series Cryptopia, previously released as a one-shot via Image.

Raab and his writing partner Deric A. Hughes were staff writers on Warehouse 13 writing their first episode "Duped" which aired August 25, 2009. They penned seven episodes over the 5 season run and eventually became the producers on the final season. In 2015, Raab and Hughes joined Beauty & the Beast as supervising producers penning four episodes of the show. Following the series conclusion, they contributed to the 2016–2017 season of The Flash writing the episode "King Shark", before joining Season 3 as co-executive producers and writers. The duo subsequently joined the writing team of the third season of Scream and acted as writers and producers for the final season of Arrow.

== Bibliography ==
=== Marvel Comics ===
==== As editor ====
Assistant editor:

- X-Men vol. 2 #31–56 (1994–1996)
- Uncanny X-Men #311–336 (1994–1996)
- Wolverine vol. 2 #80–105 (1994–1996)
- X-Force #33–58 (1994–1996)
- Generation X #1–19 (1994–1996)
- Weapon X #1–4 (1995)
- The All-New Exiles vs. X-Men (one-shot, Ultraverse, 1995)
- The All-New Exiles #3 (as "X-Pert", Ultraverse, 1995)

Reprint editor:

- X-Men Archives #1–4 (1995)
- Wolverine: Triumphs and Tragedies (tpb, 164 pages, 1995, ISBN 0-7851-0157-8)

==== As writer ====
- The Avengers:
  - "A Bigger Man Than I..." (with Yancey Labat, co-feature in #375, 1994) collected in The Avengers: The Gathering Omnibus (hc, 1,152 pages, 2021, ISBN 1-302-92649-7)
  - "The Door: Synchronicity" (with Jeff Matsuda, co-feature in #382, 1995) collected in The Avengers: Taking A.I.M. (tpb, 504 pages, 2022, ISBN 1-302-93233-0)
  - "The Crossing" (script by Raab from a plot by Raab and Terry Kavanagh, art by Mike Deodato, Jr., in #393–394, 1995–1996) collected in The Avengers: The Crossing Omnibus (hc, 792 pages, 2012, ISBN 0-7851-6203-8)
  - "First Sign" (script by Raab from a plot by Raab and Terry Kavanagh, art by Mike Deodato, Jr., in #398–399, 1996) collected in The Avengers/Iron Man: First Sign (tpb, 344 pages, 2013, ISBN 0-7851-8496-1)
- X-Men: Time Gliders #1–4 (with Mike Gustovich (#1), David Boller (#2), John Hebert (#3) and Roman Morales (#4), 1995)
  - Series of promotional giveaway minicomics included with kids' meals at Hardee's fast-food restaurants.
- The Vision #3: "Visionary Dreams" (plot assist; written by Bob Harras, art by Manny Clark, 1995) collected in The Avengers: Ultron Unbound (tpb, 224 pages, 2015, ISBN 0-7851-9269-7)
- The All-New Exiles (Ultraverse):
  - "Out of the Frying Pan..." (dialogue assist; written by Terry Kavanagh, art by M. C. Wyman and Ken Lashley, in #1, 1995)
  - "Fresh Blood" (script by Raab from a plot by Terry Kavanagh, art by M. C. Wyman and Ken Lashley, in #2, 1995)
  - "Sixx of One..." (with M. C. Wyman, co-feature in #5, 1996)
- Daredevil:
  - "Smoky Mirrors" (with Shawn McManus, in #352, 1996) collected in Daredevil: Purgatory and Paradise (tpb, 504 pages, 2019, ISBN 1-302-91879-6)
  - "Weight of the World" (plot assist; written by Joe Kelly, art by Richie Acosta, in #373, 1998) collected in Daredevil: Widow's Kiss (tpb, 504 pages, 2015, ISBN 0-7851-9297-2)
- Marvel 2099:
  - X-Nation 2099:
    - "Vertigo" (co-written by Raab and Tom Peyer, art by Humberto Ramos, Roberto Flores and Mike S. Miller, in #3, 1996)
    - "X-Nation's Final Hour" (script by Raab from a plot by Raab and Terry Kavanagh, art by Eric Battle, in #4–6, 1996)
  - Fantastic Four 2099 #6–8 (script by Raab from a plot by Raab and Terry Kavanagh, art by Pasqual Ferry, 1996)
  - Spider-Man 2099 #45–46 (script by Raab from a plot by Raab and Terry Kavanagh, art by Mike McKone, 1996)
  - 2099: World of Tomorrow #1–8 (co-written by Raab and Joe Kelly, art by Pasqual Ferry, Jason Armstrong, David Brewer, Karl Moline (#3–4) and Yancey Labat (#4), 1996–1997)
- Uncanny Origins #1: "The Origin of Cyclops" (with Dave Hoover, anthology, 1996) collected in Uncanny Origins: Mutants and Monsters (tpb, 168 pages, 2019, ISBN 1-302-91983-0)
- What If...? vol. 2 (anthology):
  - "Arachnamorphosis" (with Ariel Olivetti, in #88, 1996)
  - "The Fantastic Farce" (with Mike S. Miller, in #89, 1996)
  - "The Traitor" (with Ariel Olivetti, in #-1, 1997)
- Black Knight: Exodus: "The Bond" (with Jim Cheung, one-shot, 1996)
  - Collected in Avengers/X-Men: Bloodties (hc, 216 pages, 2012, ISBN 0-7851-6127-9)
  - Collected in X-Men: The Rise of Apocalypse (tpb, 400 pages, 2016, ISBN 1-302-90069-2)
- X-Force Annual '96: "Denouement" (script by Raab from a plot by Terry Kavanagh, art by Ed Benes, co-feature, 1996) collected in Cable and X-Force: Onslaught! (tpb, 456 pages, 2019, ISBN 1-302-91619-X)
- Domino #1–3 (with David Perrin, 1997) collected in X-Men: Domino (tpb, 288 pages, 2018, ISBN 1-302-91226-7)
- Excalibur:
  - The Battle for Britain (tpb, 504 pages, 2022, ISBN 1-302-93446-5) includes:
    - "Portrait of the Artist" (with Randy Green, Rob Haynes, Casey Jones, and Aaron Lopresti, in #106, 1997)
    - "The Battle for Britain" (with Salvador Larroca, in #107–110, 1997)
    - "A True and Terrible Sacrifice" (with Rob Haynes and Casey Jones, in #-1, 1997)
    - "Broken Vows" (with Robert Stotz (#111) and Pete Woods, in #111–114, 1997)
    - "Missionaries" (with Mel Rubi, in #115, 1997)
    - Colossus: "A Most Dangerous Game" (with Bryan Hitch, one-shot, 1997)
    - New Mutants: Truth or Death #1–3 (with Bernard Chang, 1997–1998)
  - You are Cordially Invited (tpb, 512 pages, 2023, ISBN 1-302-95333-8) includes:
    - "Sins of the Past" (with Mel Rubi, in #116–117, 1998)
    - "Preludes and Nightmares" (with Mel Rubi and Jim Calafiore (#119), in #118–120, 1998)
    - "The Search" (with Trevor Scott and Dale Eaglesham (#122), in #121–123, 1998)
    - "Tying the Knot" (with Dale Eaglesham, in #124–125, 1998)
- Psylocke and Archangel: Crimson Dawn #1–4 (with Salvador Larroca, 1997)
- X-Men: The Trial of Gambit (tpb, 400 pages, 2016, ISBN 1-302-90070-6) includes:
  - X-Men vol. 2 #62–64: "Games of Deceit and Death" (script by Raab from a plot by Scott Lobdell, art by Carlos Pacheco, 1997)
  - Uncanny X-Men #345: "Moving On" (script by Raab from a plot by Scott Lobdell, art by Joe Madureira and Mel Rubi, 1997)
- Star Trek: Voyager #6–8: "Relicquest" (with Jesus Redondo, 1997)
- X-Men Unlimited (anthology):
  - "Primal" (with Mel Rubi, in #16, 1997) collected in Generation X: The Secret of M (tpb, 480 pages, 2023, ISBN 1-302-95173-4)
  - "Unforgiven" (with Jim Calafiore, in #19, 1998) collected in Excalibur: You are Cordially Invited (tpb, 512 pages, 2023, ISBN 1-302-95333-8)
  - "Lessons" (with Al Rio, in #23, 1999) collected in X-Men: The Magneto War (tpb, 504 pages, 2018, ISBN 1-302-91376-X)
- Journey into Mystery #514–516: "Shang-Chi, Master of Kung Fu" (with Brian Hagen, anthology, 1997–1998)
- X-Man: All Saints' Day (with Terry Dodson, graphic novel, 48 pages, 1997, ISBN 0-7851-0599-9)
- Wolverine #½: "Resolutions" (with Joe Phillips, Wizard, 1997) collected in Wolverine Omnibus Volume 6 (hc, 1,152 pages, 2025, ISBN 1-30296-431-3)
- X-Men/Alpha Flight vol. 2 #1–2 (with John Cassaday, 1998)
  - Collected in X-Men/Alpha Flight (hc, 280 pages, 2011, ISBN 0-7851-5513-9; tpb, 2016, ISBN 1-302-90025-0)
  - Collected in Alpha Flight by John Byrne Omnibus (hc, 1,248 pages, 2017, ISBN 1-302-90405-1)
- Union Jack #1–3 (with John Cassaday, 1998–1999) collected as Union Jack (tpb, 96 pages, 2002, ISBN 1-84653-419-4)
- Mutant X #13: "The Hunger" (with Mike S. Miller, 1999) collected in Mutant X: The Complete Collection Volume 1 (tpb, 480 pages, 2018, ISBN 1-302-91325-5)
- Uncanny X-Men Annual '99 (with Anthony Williams, 1999) collected in X-Men vs. Apocalypse: The Ages of Apocalypse (tpb, 288 pages, 2008, ISBN 0-7851-2264-8)
- X-Men: The Hellfire Club #1–4 (with Charlie Adlard, 2000)
- Excalibur vol. 2 #1–4 (with Pablo Raimondi, 2001) collected in Excalibur: You are Cordially Invited (tpb, 512 pages, 2023, ISBN 1-302-95333-8)

=== DC Comics ===
- Green Lantern:
  - Green Lantern 80-Page Giant #1: "Shepherd" (with Josh Hood, anthology, 1998)
  - DC First: Green Lantern/Green Lantern (with Jamal Igle and Pete Woods, one-shot, 2002)
  - Green Lantern Secret Files & Origins #3: "Hard-Loving Heroes" (with Jamal Igle, co-feature, 2002)
  - Green Lantern vol. 3 #165–175 (with Rick Burchett, Chris McLoughlin (#170), Jim Fern, Jamal Igle (#174) and Andy Smith (#175), 2003–2004)
- Batman 80-Page Giant #2: "The Lucky Break" (with Sal Buscema, anthology, 1999)
- Teen Titans by Geoff Johns Omnibus (hc, 1,440 pages, 2013, ISBN 1-4012-3693-6) includes:
  - Legends of the DC Universe 80-Page Giant #2: "Passenger 15B" (co-written by Raab and Geoff Johns, art by Justiniano, anthology, 2000)
  - Beast Boy #1–4 (co-written by Raab and Geoff Johns, art by Justiniano, 2000)
  - The Titans (co-written by Raab and Geoff Johns):
    - The Titans Annual: "The Way of the Warrior" (with Justiniano) and "Immortal Justice: The Legacy of Bushido" (with Rick Mays, 2000)
    - The Titans Secret Files & Origins #2 (co-features, 2000):
      - "Super Friends" (with Drew Johnson)
      - "Shifting Gears" (with Georges Jeanty)
      - "Who is Tara Markov?" (with Derec Aucoin)
- Young Justice: Sins of Youth (tpb, 320 pages, 2000, ISBN 1-56389-748-2) includes:
  - Sins of Youth: Aquaboy and Lagoon Man: "Turning Back the Tides of Time" (with Sunny Lee, one-shot, 2000)
  - Sins of Youth: Secret Files & Origins: "Crisis on Infantile Earths" (co-written by Raab and Geoff Johns, art by Carlo Barberi, co-feature, 2000)
- Secret Files & Origins Guide to the DC Universe 2000: "Teenage Super-Hero Dating Secrets" (with Adam Hughes, co-feature, 2000)
- Legend of the Hawkman #1–3 (with Michael Lark, 2000)
- Wonder Woman vol. 2 #162–163: "God Complex" (with Derec Aucoin, 2000)
- JLA: Shogun of Steel (with Justiniano, one-shot, Elseworlds, 2002)
- Action Comics #791: "The Invitation" (with Derec Aucoin, 2002)
- 9-11 Volume 2: "A Tale of Two Americans" (with Roger Robinson, anthology graphic novel, 224 pages, 2002, ISBN 1-56389-878-0)
- Green Arrow vol. 3 #23–25: "Black Circle: Urban Knights, Parts One, Three, Five" (with Charlie Adlard, 2003) collected in Green Arrow: Archer's Quest Omnibus Volume 1 (hc, 1,128 pages, 2025, ISBN 1-7995-0068-3)
- The Human Race #1–7: "Awakening" (with Justiniano, 2005)

==== Wildstorm ====
- Gen-Active #1–4, 6: "Evo and Bliss" (with Bryan Hitch (#1), Scott Williams (#2), Eric Canete (#3), Michael O'Hare (#4) and Richard Friend (#6), anthology, 2000–2001)
- Gen^{13}:
  - Gen^{13} vol. 2 #57–59 (with Ed Benes, 2000–2001)
  - Gen^{13} Annual '00: "Devil's Night, Part One" (with Kaare Andrews, 2000)
  - Gen^{13}: Medicine Song (with Brent Anderson, one-shot, 2001)
- Wildstorm Annual '00: "Devil's Night, Part Four" (with Jeff Moy, 2000)
- Jezebelle #1–6: "A Small Corner of Hell" (with Steve Ellis, 2001)
- Star Trek Special: "When the Stars Come A-Calling" (with John Lucas, anthology one-shot, 2001)

=== Other publishers ===
- Lee Falk's Fantomen (anthology, Egmont):
  - "Simsons bojor" ("The Temple") (with Joan Boix, in vol. 50 #16, 1999)
  - "Domedagssekten" ("The Doomsday Sect") (with César Spadari, in vol. 50 #20, 1999)
  - "Ödets spjut" ("The Spear of Destiny") (with Joan Boix, in vol. 51 #5, 10, 23 and 26, 2000)
  - "I maffians våld" ("Revenge of the Mafia") (with Romano Felmang, in vol. 52 #16, 2001)
  - "Hjälten" ("The Hero") (with Dan Davis, in vol. 52 #17, 2001)
  - "Den osynlige Fantomen" ("The Invisible Phantom") (with Paul Ryan, in vol. 52 #25, 2001)
  - "Det första uppdraget" ("The First Assignment") (with Roy Mann, in vol. 54 #4, 2003)
  - "Trollkarlens lärling" ("The Apprentice") (with Heiner Bade, in vol. 54 #20, 2003)
- Cryptopia (with Pat Quinn):
  - Image Introduces... Cryptopia (one-shot, Image, 2002)
  - Issues #2–3 (2012) were self-published digitally under the Wondermasons label.
  - Issues #4–5 (2020–2021) were self-published digitally via Comixology under the Wondermasons label.
- The Phantom (Moonstone Books):
  - The Phantom: The Ghost Who Walks (tpb, 172 pages, 2003, ISBN 1-933076-09-7) includes:
    - The Phantom: The Ghost Killer (with Fernando Blanco, graphic novel, 48 pages, 2002, ISBN 0-9710129-6-2)
    - The Phantom: The Singh Web (with Fernando Blanco, graphic novel, 48 pages, 2002, ISBN 0-9710129-7-0)
  - The Phantom: The Hunt (with Lou Manna, graphic novel, 48 pages, 2003, ISBN 0-9721668-4-X)
  - The Phantom vol. 5 (anthology):
    - The Phantom: Death in the Deep Woods (tpb, 120 pages, 2005, ISBN 1-933076-06-2) collects:
      - "Stones of Blood" (with Pat Quinn, in #1–2, 2003–2004)
      - "Curse of the Phantom" (with Nick Derington, in #3–4, 2004)
    - "The Aviatrix" (with Pat Quinn, in #7–8, 2005)
    - "Nanamaru" (with Rick Burchett, in #11, 2006)
  - The Phantom: Legacy and the Law (tpb, 176 pages, 2009, ISBN 1-933076-61-5) collects:
    - The Phantom: Legacy (with Pat Quinn, graphic novel, 96 pages, 2006, ISBN 1-933076-11-9)
    - The Phantom: Law of the Jungle (as editor; written by Joe Gentile, drawn by Paul Guinan, graphic novel, 72 pages, 2006, ISBN 1-933076-12-7)
  - The Phantom: Generations #1 (with Pat Quinn, anthology, 2009) collected in The Phantom: Generations (tpb, 376 pages, 2010, ISBN 1-933076-83-6)
  - The Phantom: Ghost Who Walks #5–12 (as editor; written by Mike Bullock, drawn by Silvestre Szilagyi and Bob Pedroza (#7), 2009–2010)
- Comiculture #1–2: "The Lost Tribe" (with Allen Gladfelter, anthology, Mad Science Media, 2002–2003)
- Vampirella vol. 2 #13–14: "Wilding Sanction, Parts 3 and 4" (with Mike Mayhew and Manuel García, Harris, 2002)
- Moonstone Monsters: Sea Creatures: "Croaked" (with Chris Burnham, anthology one-shot, Moonstone Books, 2003)
- Vampi: Vicious Rampage #1–2 (with Kevin Lau, Anarchy Studios, 2005)
- Living in Infamy #1–4 (co-written by Raab and Deric A. Hughes, art by Greg Kirkpatrick, Ludovico Technique, 2005–2006)
- 7 Brothers vol. 2 #1–5 (co-written by Raab and Deric A. Hughes, art by Edison George, Virgin, 2007–2008) collected as 7 Brothers: The Blood That Runs (tpb, 144 pages, 2008, ISBN 1-934413-14-3)
- Space Doubles: Set the Controls: "AKA" (co-written by Raab and Deric A. Hughes, art by Pat Quinn, story created for the tpb, 144 pages, Th3rd World Studios, 2008, ISBN 0-9818694-1-6)
- Warehouse 13 #1, 5 (co-written by Raab and Deric A. Hughes, art by Ben Morse, Dynamite, 2011–2012) collected as Warehouse 13 (tpb, 128 pages, 2012, ISBN 1-60690-272-5)
- Heavy Metal #283: "Der Fischerhaus" (co-written by Raab and Deric A. Hughes, art by Mike May, anthology, Heavy Metal Media, 2016)
- Love is Love (untitled one-page story, with Tristan Jones, anthology graphic novel, 144 pages, IDW Publishing, 2016, ISBN 1-63140-939-5)
- Dream Theater: Parasomnia: "A Broken Man" (co-written by Raab and Deric A. Hughes, art by Gianenrico Bonacorsi, anthology graphic novel, 128 pages, Z2 Comics, 2026, ISBN 979-8886561999)
- The Last Starfighter #1–5 (co-written by Raab and Deric A. Hughes, art by Willi Roberts, Mad Cave Studios, 2026)

Preceded by Tom DeFalco	Journey into Mystery writer 1997–1998	Succeeded by Scott Lobdell
Preceded by Warren Ellis	Excalibur writer 1997–1998, 2001	Succeeded by Chris Claremont
Preceded by Judd Winick	Green Lantern writer 2003–2004	Succeeded by Ron Marz
