= Secret Agent X-9 =

American newspaper comic strip

- Secret Agent X-9 art by Alex Raymond (1934).
- Author: Dashiell Hammett
- Illustrator: Alex Raymond
- Current status/schedule: Concluded daily & Sunday strip
- Launch date: January 22, 1934
- End date: February 10, 1996
- Alternate name: X-9
- Syndicate(s): King Features Syndicate
- Genre: Adventure

Secret Agent X-9 is a comic strip created by writer Dashiell Hammett (The Maltese Falcon) and artist Alex Raymond (Flash Gordon). Syndicated by King Features, it ran from January 22, 1934, until February 10, 1996.

== Premise and publication history ==
Daily strips by Al Williamson.

X-9 was initially an unnamed agent who worked for an anonymous agency. X-9 used the name "Dexter" in the first story ("It's not my name, but it'll do") and kept using it or being called by it in later stories, but acquired the name "Phil Corrigan" in the 1940s. Decades later, the strip was renamed Secret Agent Corrigan. The agency was also specifically identified as the FBI, but this would be downplayed in the '70s as the Bureau weathered bad publicity and was once more nameless.

After four stories by Hammett, Alex Raymond illustrated two stories written by Don W. Moore and one written by Leslie Charteris, who then wrote three more stories illustrated by Charles Flanders. After Charteris left the strip in 1936, scripts were credited to a King Features house name, "Robert Storm". Nicholas Afonsky drew the strip for most of 1938, followed by Austin Briggs until 1940.

Mel Graff took over the art in 1940 and began writing the strip as well in 1942, devising the name Phil Corrigan. The name Phil Corrigan was inspired by Phil Cardigan, a character in one of Graff's earlier comic strips, The Adventures of Patsy.

Graff also gave X-9 more of a personal life, introducing Belinda "Linda" Reed as Corrigan's gal Friday and early romantic interest in 1940. Wilda Dorre (later Dorray), a beautiful, blonde mystery novelist, debuted in late 1944 as a romantic rival. Corrigan finally chooses Wilda in 1947. Graff provides Linda a happy ending as well, as she marries Phil's younger brother, Bing, who was introduced in 1945 and is Phil's partner through 1947. Both female characters inspired popular songs: "Linda" written by Jack Lawrence and "Wilda" written by Graff. Wilda and Phil marry in 1950, and the two have a daughter, Philda, in 1952.

Graff also created a series of often grotesque villains with colorful names, including Blue-Jaw (introduced in 1944), Goldplate (1945), Liver-Lips (1946, 1947), and Grape-Eyes (1947). There was also Corrigan's criminal lookalike, Phil Haze (1946). Additionally, Corrigan encountered the beautiful criminal businesswoman Bargain Benny (1954) and the endearing rogue Prince Iguana (1953). Corrigan also had two professional colleagues in addition to his brother: Joe Florida (1948) and Joe Otterfoot (1952). Otterfoot is the rare depiction of a Native American in comic strips of this period in that he is portrayed as intelligent, competent, witty and attractive enough for a female painter to seek him out as a male model. He is also unique for having an interracial romance with that painter.

Graff was followed by artist Bob Lubbers, who used the pseudonym "Bob Lewis" and drew the strip from 1960 through 1966. From 1967 to 1979, the strip was written by Archie Goodwin and drawn by Al Williamson. After a few years, Goodwin eliminated Wilda with an off-panel divorce in order to free up Corrigan for romance with the various attractive women he encountered. The attractive and intelligent Karla Kopak appeared in a number of stories between 1974 and 1980. Making her the niece of Kalla Kopak, a character from the comic strip Brick Bradford, Goodwin tied the narratives of the two strips together. He also introduced a number of villains, including criminal matriarch Millicent Murkley (1967), hitman Joe Ice (1969), and Corrigan's nemesis, Doctor Seven (1971).

The strip's final artist was veteran George Evans, who wrote and drew it from 1980 to his retirement in 1996. Evans introduced two romantic interests for Corrigan: Anina Kreemar, the wealthy niece of Corrigan's bureau chief, and Corrigan's friendly rival Jennever Brand, a spirited female agent of a rival clandestine spy agency.

In 2000–2001, X-9 made a guest appearance in the Flash Gordon Sunday strip. One page was drawn by Evans, marking X-9's last appearance in newspaper comics.

=== Credits ===
- Dashiell Hammett (story) & Alex Raymond (art): Jan 22, 1934 - April 20, 1935
- Don W. Moore (story) & Alex Raymond (art): April 22 - Sept 21, 1935
- Leslie Charteris (story) & Alex Raymond (art): Sept 23 - Nov 16, 1935
- Leslie Charteris (story) & Charles Flanders (art): Nov 18, 1935 - March 28, 1936
- Robert Storm (story) & Charles Flanders (art): March 30, 1936 - April 9, 1938
- Robert Storm (story) & Nicholas Afonsky (art): April 11 - Nov 5, 1938
- Robert Storm (story) & Austin Briggs (art): Nov 7, 1938 - June 1, 1940
- Robert Storm (story) & Mel Graff (art): June 3, 1940 - 1945
- Mel Graff (story and art): 1945 - March 19, 1960
- Bob Lubbers (story and art): March 21, 1960 - Jan 28, 1967
- Archie Goodwin (story) & Al Williamson (art): Jan 30, 1967 - Feb 2, 1980
- George Evans (story and art): Feb 4, 1980 - Feb 10, 1996

== In comic books ==
Cover of Australian Secret Agent X-9 comic book.

Cover of Swedish Agent X9 magazine. Art by Rolf Gohs.

=== United States ===
The first comic-book story with X-9 produced in the U.S. was a serialized backup feature in the Flash Gordon book, in a quintet of five-page installments in issues #4–8 (1967). The first part ("The Key to Power") was written by Goodwin and drawn by Williamson. The other parts are uncredited. In June, 1988, a second series featuring X-9 titled "The Official Secret Agent" was published by Pioneer Comics, also featuring stories written by Goodwin and drawn by Williamson. It lasted seven issues.

=== Europe ===
Secret Agent X-9 has had a long history in European comic books. Agent X9, in Scandinavia and the Nordic countries, started in 1969 under the title X9 in Sweden. Its two backup titles were generally "Jungle Jim" and "The Phantom". In 1971 the magazine was renamed Agent X9 and retooled into an anthology title, publishing many different comics in frequent rotation, mostly around the themes of detectives, agents and adventures. After this, the feature "Secret Agent X-9" no longer appeared in every issue.

In Sweden, the various daily strip incarnations of the feature were published in parallel in the magazine, but received different titles, due to the art styles and appearances of the main character differing wildly. Raymond's and Lubbers' versions had the title Agent X9, Graff's version had the title Kelly vid FBI (Kelly at FBI), and Williamson's and Evans' versions had the title Agent Corrigan, as the strip already had been renamed in English.

The Agent X9 comic book has been published in the following countries:

- Sweden (Semic Press; as X9 until 1971): 1969–present
- Finland (as Agentti X9): 1973–1994, 2010
- Norway: 1974–2015, 2017–2019
- Denmark (Interpresse): 1976–2002
- West Germany: 1976–1977
- Netherlands: 1984–1985

During the 1980s, the Agent X9 editors requested more Secret Agent X-9 material from King Features since the newspaper stories were quickly published. King Features then began to supply the magazine with exclusive stories that have never been published elsewhere. Although these stories were made directly for comic magazines, they were produced in the regular daily strip format. The following produced stories for the Agent X9 magazine:

- Joe Gill (script) and Jack Sparling (art): two stories (1983)
- M. Gill (script) and Miguel A. Repetto (art): 30 stories (1985–1995)
- Dean Davis (script) and John Dixon (art): 16 stories (1997–2003)
- Mike W. Barr (script) and Mike Manley (art): two stories (2007–2009)

Unlike the previous stories, the Barr & Manley stories did not use a daily strip format.

=== Australia ===
An Australian comic book, Phil Corrigan: Secret Agent X9, was published by Atlas Publications between 1948 and 1956. It featured reprints of the newspaper strips.

== Films ==
Secret Agent X-9 (1945) movie poster.

Two film serials were produced featuring Agent X-9, one in 1937 and one in 1945. In the first, Scott Kolk plays Agent Dexter a.k.a. Agent X-9. One of his top assignments is to recover the crown jewels of Belgravia and to capture master thief Blackstone. Accompanying him is Shara Graustark (Jean Rogers), who has her own reasons and agenda. The second serial, Secret Agent X-9, stars a young Lloyd Bridges as Phil Corrigan/X-9. In the 13 chapters, American, Australian and Chinese agents join forces against the Nazis and Japanese to uncover and possess the formula that will help create a synthetic aviation fuel, code-named "722". Keye Luke co-stars as Chinese agent Ah Fong, Jan Wiley as Australian agent Lynn Moore, Victoria Horne as Japanese master spy Nabura and Benson Fong as Japanese scientist Dr. Hakahima. The three-country alliance is referred to as the United Nations, predating the term's use by the real-life organization.

== Radio ==
Secret Agent X-9 was adapted as a radio drama broadcast on BBC Radio 5 in January 1994, starring Stuart Milligan as X-9 and Connie Booth as Grace Powers. There were four episodes, adapted by Mark Brisenden and directed by Chris Wallis.

== Reprints ==
In 1976, Nostalgia Press published a trade paperback reprinting many of the early Hammett/Raymond strips, with an introduction by Bill Blackbeard. In 1983, International Polygonics published a trade paperback edition (ISBN 0-930330-05-6) of the original Dashiell Hammett/Alex Raymond strips that included an additional story scripted by Leslie Charteris and a foreword by William F. Nolan, author of Hammett: A Life on the Edge. In 1990, Kitchen Sink Press did a single volume reprint (ISBN 0-87816-077-9) of the Hammett/Raymond work on the strip.

Comics Revue magazine has reprinted many of the George Evans and Goodwin/Williamson strips.

From 2010 to 2013, IDW's imprint Library of American Comics published the Archie Goodwin/Al Williamson strips complete in five volumes. A sixth volume collected strips by George Evans. In 2015, IDW published a volume with the Hammett/Raymond strips.

== In popular culture ==
- The ID of the Agency Director in the 1975 TV movie Columbo: Identity Crisis states Phil Corrigan, Secret Agent X-9.
- The rock band Modest Mouse released a song entitled and about Secret Agent X-9 on their album Sad Sappy Sucker.
- In Kurt Vonnegut's novel Cat's Cradle, the character Franklin Hoenikker was known as Secret Agent X-9 in high school.
- The animated television series Samurai Jack featured a film noir homage episode featuring robot assassin X9.
- In Stephen King's novel Roadwork Secret Agent X-9 is mentioned.
- Former Secret Agent X-9 writer Archie Goodwin, in his 1970s revival of DC Comics' Manhunter, tipped his hat to Agent Corrigan and to James Bond, by assigning the Manhunter character Interpol case-file number 007X9.
- In "Topsy Turvy World", a third season story arc of The Rocky and Bullwinkle Show, the agent who picks up the protagonists for Captain Peachfuzz, now working at the Weather Bureau, is addressed as X-9.
- Secret Agent X-9 is cited as a possible origin for the slang term "X9" in Brazil, meaning "snitch".
