= The Phantom =

Comic strip

- First Sunday strip (May 28, 1939); art by Ray Moore
- Author: Lee Falk
- Current status/schedule: Running
- Launch date: February 17, 1936; 90 years ago
- Syndicate: King Features Syndicate
- Genre: adventure

The Phantom is an American adventure comic strip, first published by Lee Falk in February 1936. The main character, the Phantom, is a fictional costumed crime-fighter who operates from the fictional African country of Bangalla. The character has been adapted for television, film and video games.

The series began with a daily newspaper strip on February 17, 1936, followed by a color Sunday strip on May 28, 1939; both are still running as of 2026. In 1966, King Features stated that The Phantom was being published in 583 newspapers worldwide. At its peak, the strip was read by over 100 million people daily.

Falk worked on The Phantom until his death in 1999; since his death, the comic strip has been written by Tony DePaul. Since 2016, it has been drawn by Mike Manley (Monday–Saturday) and, since 2017, Jeff Weigel (Sunday). Previous artists on the newspaper strip include Ray Moore, Wilson McCoy, Bill Lignante, Sy Barry, George Olesen, Keith Williams, Fred Fredericks, Graham Nolan, Eduardo Barreto, Paul Ryan, and Terry Beatty. In the strip, the Phantom is 21st in a line of crime-fighters which began in 1536, when the father of British sailor Christopher Walker was killed during a pirate attack. Swearing an oath on the skull of his father's murderer to fight evil, Christopher began a legacy of the Phantom which would pass from father to son. Nicknames for the Phantom include "The Ghost Who Walks", "Guardian of the Eastern Dark" and "The Man Who Cannot Die".

Unlike many other superheroes, the Phantom has no superpowers; he relies on his strength, intelligence, skill at arms (he carries two holstered handguns, a revolver and a 1911 .45 autopistol, one on each hip, and is an expert marksman with both), and the myth of his immortality to take action against the forces of evil. The 21st Phantom is married to Diana Palmer; they met while he studied in the United States and they have two children, Kit and Heloise. He has a trained wolf named Devil and a horse named Hero, and like the 20 previous Phantoms he lives in the ancient Skull Cave.

The Phantom was the first fictional hero to wear the skintight costume which has become a hallmark of comic-book superheroes, and was the first shown in a mask with no visible pupils (another superhero standard). Comics historian Peter Coogan has described the Phantom as a "transitional" figure, since the Phantom has some of the characteristics of pulp magazine heroes such as The Shadow and the Spider and earlier jungle heroes such as Tarzan, as well as anticipating the features of comic book heroes such as Superman, Batman, and Captain America.

== Publication history ==
=== Creation ===
After the success of Mandrake the Magician, King Features Syndicate asked Falk to develop a new feature. His first effort was to write and draw a strip about King Arthur and his knights. When King Features rejected the strip, Falk developed the Phantom, a mysterious, costumed crime-fighter. He planned the first few months of the story, and drew the first two weeks as a sample.

Fascinated by myths and legends (such as King Arthur and El Cid) and the modern fictional characters Zorro, Tarzan and The Jungle Book's Mowgli, Falk envisioned the character as wealthy playboy Jimmy Wells by day and the crime-fighting Phantom by night. During his first story, "The Singh Brotherhood", before disclosing that Wells was the Phantom, Falk changed the setting to a jungle and made the Phantom an apparently immortal, mythic figure. Thinking that there were already too many characters called "the Phantom" (including The Phantom Detective and The Phantom of the Opera), Falk considered calling his hero "The Gray Ghost". However, he could not find a name he liked better and decided to stay with "The Phantom".

In the A&E American cable TV documentary The Phantom: Comic Strip Crusader, Falk explained that Greek busts inspired him to omit the Phantom's pupils when the character was wearing his mask. He incorrectly believed that ancient Greek busts had no pupils (they were painted on originally and faded with time), which he said gave them an "inhuman, awe-inspiring appearance." In an interview for Comic Book Marketplace, Falk said the Phantom's skin-tight costume was inspired by Robin Hood, who wore tights in films and onstage.

Falk was a Shakespeare enthusiast, and the comic included several references to Shakespeare. These include the third Phantom playing Juliet in the original premiere of Romeo and Juliet, as well as marrying Shakespeare's niece.

=== Newspaper strips ===
The Phantom began as a daily strip on February 17, 1936 with "The Singh Brotherhood", written by Falk and drawn by him for two weeks and then by Ray Moore (assistant to artist Phil Davis on Mandrake the Magician). That year, The Phantom was serialized in the Australian Woman's Mirror. A Sunday Phantom strip was added on May 28, 1939.

During World War II Falk joined the Office of War Information, where he became chief of the radio foreign-language division. Moore also served during the war and left the strip to his assistant, Wilson McCoy. When Moore returned he worked sporadically on the strip until 1949, when McCoy succeeded him. During McCoy's tenure, The Phantom appeared in thousands of newspapers worldwide and was smuggled by boat into Nazi-occupied Norway during the war; "Phantom" was a password for the Norwegian resistance movement.

McCoy died unexpectedly in 1961. Carmine Infantino and Bill Lignante (who later drew several Phantom stories for comic books) filled in before a successor was found in Sy Barry. During Barry's early years he and Falk modernized the strip, laying the foundation for what is considered the Phantom's modern look. Under Barry, Bangalla became a democracy and the character of President Lamanda Luaga was introduced. Barry worked on The Phantom for over 30 years until his 1994 retirement, drawing a total of about 11,000 strips.

His longtime assistant George Olesen remained on the strip as penciller, with Keith Williams inking the daily strip. The Sunday strip was inked by Eric Doescher until Fred Fredericks succeeded him in 1995.

Falk continued to script The Phantom and Mandrake until his death on March 13, 1999. His last daily Phantom strip story, "Terror at the Opera," was finished by his wife, Elizabeth. After Falk's death King Features cooperated with European comic publisher Egmont, publisher of the Swedish Fantomen magazine (which changed from publishing Phantom stories in comic-book format to providing the newspaper strip as well) by adapting their own Phantom comic-book stories into the strip format. Fantomen writers Tony DePaul and Claes Reimerthi alternated as writers of the newspaper strip after Falk died, with DePaul handling the daily strips and Reimerthi the Sunday ones. DePaul would later become the strip's sole writer. Some stories were adapted from those originally published in Fantomen.

In 2000, Olesen and Fredericks retired from the Sunday strip. It was continued by comic-book artist Graham Nolan, who had drawn three Fantomen covers. In early 2005 Olesen and Williams left the daily strip after Olesen retired, and artist Paul Ryan (who had worked on the Fantomen comic stories and had been a fan of the character since childhood) took over the daily strip. Ryan succeeded Nolan as artist on the Sunday strip in 2007. On July 31, 2011, Eduardo Barreto became the Sunday-page artist. He died after only a few months, and Ryan temporarily took over the Sunday page again on January 15, 2012 (which featured a memorial to Barreto). Ryan also did the following week's strip, before Terry Beatty became Barreto's replacement.

Ryan died at his home unexpectedly on March 7, 2016. Mike Manley succeeded Ryan as artist on The Phantom, beginning with the strip dated May 30, 2016.

Beatty stepped down as Sunday artist in 2017, and was replaced by Jeff Weigel.

=== Internationally ===
==== United States ====
The Phantom has had a number of publishers in the United States. During the 1940s the strips were reprinted in Ace Comics, published by David McKay Publications. Harvey Comics published The Phantom during the 1950s. In 1962 Gold Key Comics took over, followed by King Comics in 1966 and Charlton in 1969. By 1977, a total of 73 issues were published. Principal Phantom artists during this period were Bill Lignante, Don Newton, Jim Aparo and Pat Boyette. George Wilson drew several covers for the Gold Key series.

In 1943, Columbia Pictures released the 15-episode serial The Phantom starring Tom Tyler as "The Phantom" and Jeanne Bates as "Diana Palmer".

DC Comics published a Phantom comic book from 1988 to 1990. The initial May–August 1988 miniseries was written by Peter David, penciled by Joe Orlando, and inked by Dennis Janke. A subsequent series, written by Mark Verheiden and drawn by Luke McDonnell, ran for thirteen issues from March 1989 to March 1990. In the series, the Phantom fought racism, toxic dumping, hunger and modern-day piracy. According to Verheiden, the series ended as much because of licensing issues as falling sales. In the final panels of issue 13, the Phantom marries Diana.

In 1987, Marvel Comics published a four-issue miniseries written by Stan Lee and based on the Defenders of the Earth TV series. Another three-issue Marvel miniseries, The Phantom: The Ghost Who Walks (February–April 1995) followed which was written and drawn by David de Vries and Glenn Lumsden; it featured the 22nd Phantom with an updated, high-tech costume. Marvel later released a four-part miniseries (May–August 1995), pencilled by Spider-Man co-creator Steve Ditko, based on the Phantom 2040 TV series. One issue featured a pin-up by the original two Spider-Man signature artists, Ditko and John Romita, Sr.

In the United States and Australia, The Phantom was released in theaters as a major motion picture starring Billy Zane as “The Phantom/Kit Walker,” the 21st Phantom. Opened June 7, 1996 nationwide in the aforementioned markets.

Moonstone Books published Phantom graphic novels beginning in 2002. Five books, written by Tom DeFalco, Ben Raab and Ron Goulart with art by Mike Collins were published. In 2003, Moonstone introduced a Phantom comic-book series written by Raab, Rafael Nieves and Chuck Dixon, and drawn by Pat Quinn, Jerry DeCaire, Nick Derington, Rich Burchett, and EricJ. After eleven issues Mike Bullock took over the scripting, with Gabriel Rearte and Carlos Magno creating the artwork before Silvestre Szilagyi became the regular artist in 2007. Bullock's stories often feature topical issues, based on actual African conflicts. In a 2007 three-part story arc, "Invisible Children", the Phantom fights a fictional warlord called "Him" (loosely based on Joseph Kony).

In 2006, Moonstone published a retcon of the Phantom's origin, "Legacy", by Raab and Quinn. Three years later the company reintroduced the series as The Phantom: Ghost Who Walks, beginning with issue 0 (a retelling of the first Phantom's origin). The aim was to make the comic darker, grittier and more realistic, similar to the 1930s stories by Lee Falk and Ray Moore. It updated the Phantom, giving him modern accessories, and introduced a number of supporting characters and villains. In the series, the Phantom fights reality-based enemies such as modern terrorists, organ smugglers and Somali pirates.

Dynamite Entertainment introduced a monthly comic-book series, The Last Phantom, in August 2010. The series was written by Scott Beatty and drawn by Eduardo Ferigato, with covers painted by Alex Ross.

In 2013, the Phantom appeared in Dynamite's five-issue miniseries, Kings Watch. In the series, written by Jeff Parker and drawn by Marc Laming, the Phantom joins Flash Gordon and Mandrake the Magician to fight Ming the Merciless and prevent his attempt to take over the planet. It was followed by the 2015 five-issue miniseries King: The Phantom in which Lothar (the co-protagonist of the Mandrake titles) serves as the new Phantom whilst looking for the mantle's rightful heir. In 2016, started a new crossover of King Features characters (The Phantom, Mandrake the Magician, Flash Gordon, Prince Valiant, Jungle Jim), Kings Quest.

In 2014, Hermes Press announced that it would publish a Phantom comic-book miniseries with new content, written by Peter David and illustrated by Sal Velluto, scheduled for publication in November 2014. It debuted October 31, 2014. For Free Comic Book Day 2015, Hermes published a Phantom comic book with art by Bill Lignante and samples of the new miniseries.

In 2024, Mad Cave Studios published a new Flash Gordon comic book, a trade paperback of Marvel's Defenders of the Earth series, and launched a new series of the team. Mad Cave released an issue #0 for Free Comic Book Day 2025 written by Ray Fawkes and illustrated by Russell Mark Olson.

==== Nordic region ====
Egmont Publications has published original Phantom stories in a fortnightly Phantom comic book in Sweden as Fantomen, in Denmark and Norway as Fantomet and in Finland as Mustanaamio (Black Mask). The first issue of Fantomen was dated October 1950, and over 1,600 issues have been published. The first story created originally for Fantomen was published in 1963, and there are a total of over 900 Fantomen stories. The average Fantomen story is over 30 pages, compared to 20–24 pages for most American comics. Artists and writers who have created stories for Fantomen include Dick Giordano, Donne Avenell, Heiner Bade, David Bishop, Dai Darell, Georges Bess, Jaime Vallvé, Joan Boix, Tony DePaul, Ulf Granberg, Ben Raab, Rolf Gohs, Scott Goodall, Eirik Ildahl, Kari Leppänen, Hans Lindahl, Janne Lundström, Cesar Spadari, Bob McLeod, Jean-Yves Mitton, Lennart Moberg, Claes Reimerthi, Paul Ryan, Alex Saviuk, Graham Nolan, Romano Felmang and Norman Worker, and they have been nicknamed "Team Fantomen". The team have experimented with the character and his surroundings, with Singh Brotherhood leader Sandal Singh taking over as President of Bangalla and the Phantom and Diana having marriage problems. In particular, the team has elaborated on the Phantom's back story, producing a lot of historical stories for all twenty earlier Phantoms. In 2018, the Norwegian branch of Egmont issued a statement that the Norwegian Fantomet edition would get cancelled at the end of 2018, thus leaving the Swedish edition as the only remaining edition in Scandinavia. The Phantom has been a noticeable part of culture in Sweden especially. Between 1986 and 2010, there was even a "Fantomenland" (Phantom Land) at the Parken Zoo in Eskilstuna in Sweden. Due to the strips and comics being exported without a coloring guide, old Fantomet and Mustanaamio comics had the Phantom wearing a light blue costume.

==== Australia ====
In Australia, the Australian Woman's Mirror began publishing the strip in 1936 and Frew Publications has published a fortnightly Phantom comic book since 1948, celebrating sixty years of uninterrupted publication in September 2008. Although Frew's comic book primarily contains reprints from the newspaper strips, Fantomen (translated into English) and other Phantom comic books, it has occasionally included original stories drawn by Australian artists such as Keith Chatto. The editor-in-chief was Jim Shepherd until his death. Frew's The Phantom is the longest-running comic-book series with the character in the world, and Australia's bestselling comic book. Frew Phantom comics appear in a number of Sydney Royal Easter Show, Royal Adelaide Show, Brisbane Royal Exhibition (EKKA),Melbourne Show and Perth Royal Show showbags.

In 2013, publisher Jim Shepherd, who had bought the rights from the original owners during the late 1980s, died of a heart attack. Shepherd had taken over the company and introduced some minor changes to placate King Features, which had become unhappy at Frew's treatment of its character. Shepherd's changes included glossy covers (replacing the standard newsprint covers), brief editorials, regular 100-page specials and, most significantly, an annual special of between 200 and 300 pages which included multiple stories and a standalone "replica" reprint of a very early Frew edition. Shepherd also embarked on an ambitious project to reprint the entire backlist of Lee Falk stories in their original formats: Frew's reprints had often been heavily edited to fit its 32-page format. Following Shepherd's death, Frew and The Phantom were continued by Shepherd's wife Judith until she sold the business to artist Glenn Ford and Rene White in 2016. Since then, the new "Frew Crew" (with new publisher Dudley Hogarth) have introduced a range of innovations:

- Kid Phantom, a standalone quarterly all-colour, glossy comic book aimed at children, with original material, illustrated by Dr Paul Mason and written by Andrew Constant.
- Giant-Size Phantom, a standalone quarterly comic book series reprinting Frew's other characters from the 1950s as well as The Phantom. The title revives an earlier title published by Frew between 1957 and 1960.
- Phantom's World, a standalone quarterly comic book series which features Phantom stories from around the world, often seen for the first time in English, as well as original material.

==== New Zealand ====
King Features sold The Phantom to a number of New Zealand newspapers, included The New Zealand Herald. The Phantom also appeared in a successful comic from the Wellington-based Feature Publications during the 1950s. The Frew comics are also available in New Zealand. The Phantom wore a mustard-colored costume in older comics printed in New Zealand, due to also not receiving a coloring guide.

==== India ====
In India, The Phantom first appeared in The Illustrated Weekly of India in the 1950s. In 1964, the Indian publisher Indrajal Comics began publishing a Phantom comic book in English. Later Indrajal would also publish The Phantom in several Indian languages. Over the years, other Indian publishers have printed Phantom comic books, the most prominent being Diamond Comics, Euro Books (formerly Egmont Imagination India), and Rani Comics. The Telugu regional daily Eenadu published translated versions of Phantom comics during the early days of its Sunday supplements. Phantom is also published in Bengali and Hindi language in local newspapers. In Hindi it is published by Indrajal comics as character name Vetaal. They have also published it in Bengali as character name, Betaal.

In the early 1990s, Regal Publishers from Kerala started publishing Phantom comics in Malayalam Language. After a gap, Regal Publishers have again started publishing Phantom comics in Malayalam in 2019.

==== Other countries ====
Italian publisher Nerbini reprinted the Phantom strip in its weekly comic newspaper L’Avventuroso, starting in issue 101, September 13, 1936. In 1939, Roberto Lemmi and Emilio Fancelli started to produce some new stories.

Italian publisher Fratelli Spada produced original Phantom stories for their L'Uomo Mascherato (The Masked Man) series of comic books during the 1960s and 1970s. Contributing artists included Raul Buzzelli, Mario Caria, Umberto Sammarini ("Usam"), Germano Ferri, Senio Pratesi, Angelo R. Todaro, and Romano Felmang. Ferri, Usam, Felmang and Caria later worked for Fantomen. Brazilian publisher RGE and German publisher Bastei produced original Phantom stories for their comic books; in Brazil, the Phantom is known as o Fantasma, and wore a red costume until 1990 due to printing issues that prevented the purple from being properly reproduced.

In 1939, the Phantom appeared in the second story of the Yugoslav comic Zigomar, "Zigomar versus the Phantom", as an opponent and then an ally of the title character. In South Africa, The Phantom ran in Afrikaans newspapers as Die Skim. In the Republic of Ireland, the Phantom appeared in both the Irish Independent and Sunday Independent newspapers during the 1950s and 1960s.

Also in 1939, the Phantom appeared in Turkey as "Kizilmaske", which translates to "Red Mask" in Turkish, by publishers Tay Yayinlari. Originally, the publishers colored the hero's costume in red on the covers, and decided to stay with that color throughout the history of the comic in Turkey, rather than use the original purple coloring. Under the name "Kizilmaske" and with color covers drawn by Turkish artists, older Lee Falk stories of the Phantom has since appeared in Turkish comic books primarily in black and white.

=== Reprints ===
The entire run of the Phantom newspaper strip was reprinted in Australia by Frew Publications, and edited versions of most stories have been published in the Scandinavian Phantom comics. In the United States, the following Phantom stories (written by Lee Falk) have been reprinted by Nostalgia Press (NP), Pacific Comics Club (PCC) or Comics Revue (CR):

- "The Sky Band", Ray Moore, November 9, 1936, CR
- "The Diamond Hunters", Ray Moore, April 12, 1937, PCC
- "Little Tommy", Ray Moore, September 20, 1937, PCC
- "The Prisoner of the Himalayas", Ray Moore, February 7, 1938, NP
- "Adventure in Algiers", Ray Moore, June 20, 1938, CR
- "The Shark's Nest", Ray Moore, July 25, 1938, PCC
- "Fishers of Pearls", Ray Moore, November 7, 1938, CR
- "The Slave Traders", Ray Moore, January 30, 1939, CR
- "The Mysterious Girl", Ray Moore, May 8, 1939, CR
- "The Golden Circle", Ray Moore, September 4, 1939, PCC
- "The Seahorse", Ray Moore, January 22, 1940, PCC
- "The Game of Alvar", Ray Moore, July 29, 1940, PCC
- "Diana Aviatrix", Ray Moore, December 16, 1940, PCC
- "The Phantom's Treasure", Ray Moore, July 14, 1941, PCC
- "The Phantom Goes to War", Ray Moore and Wilson McCoy, February 2, 1942, PCC
- "The Slave Markets of Mucar", Sy Barry, August 21, 1961, CR

In its October 2009 issue, Comics Revue began reprinting the Sunday story "The Return of the Sky Band" in color.

As of August 2019, Hermes Press has reprinted sixteen volumes of Phantom dailies and five volumes of Phantom Sundays. Volumes nine and ten of the dailies also carry the color Sundays from 1949 to 1951, when the stories for dailies and Sundays were synchronized. In 2011 Hermes began reprinting the Complete Gold Key Volumes 1 and 2 with issues 1–17 and King's complete Phantom issues 18–28 comics side by side. The following year, it began reprinting the Charlton Years: Volume 1 through volume 5, issues 30–74. There was no issue 29, as Charlton started their series with issue 30) Hermes has also published a full-size Phantom Sunday Archives, 1939–1942.

== Other media ==
A live action serial titled The Phantom was released in 1943 stars Tom Tyler. As the alter ego of Kit Walker had not yet been introduced in the comic strip, the serial uses the moniker Geoffrey Prescott.

The 1986 animated series Defenders of the Earth is a team-up between The Phantom, Mandrake the Magician (another hero by Lee Falk), Lothar, and Flash Gordon.

The animated series Phantom 2040 ran for two series between 1994 and 1996. It follows the 24th Phantom.

A live action film of The Phantom was released in 1996, starring Billy Zane.

A live action mini-series, The Phantom, was released on Syfy in 2009 starring Ryan Carnes as the 22nd phantom.

As of 2026, a live action TV series of The Phantom is in production. The series will be produced and directed by Reginald Hudlin.

=== Tribal pop art ===
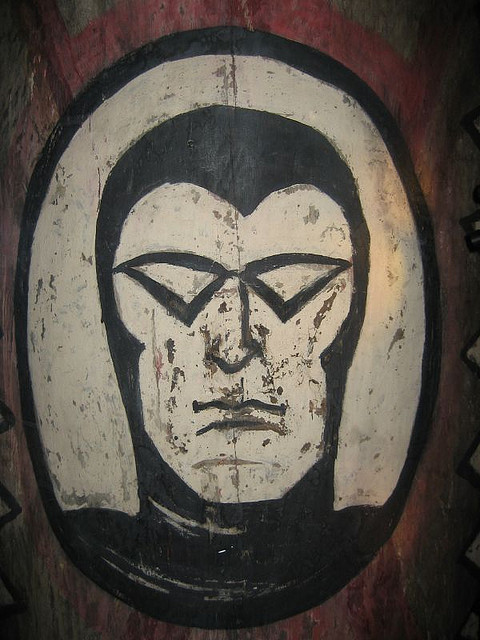
Photo of Phantom on shield

During World War II, soldiers received care packages containing comics. The soldiers stationed in Papua New Guinea shared these comics, and the Phantom became extremely popular among the tribes. The Papuan people who could read English would read the stories and share the images with others; by the 1970s, they were available in Tok Pisin. The character's image is often painted on ceremonial shields or alongside other tribal art. This is sometimes referred to as "tribal pop art".
