= Vallvé =

Vallvé is a Catalan surname. Notable people with the surname include:

- Jaime Vallvé (1928–2000), Spanish comic strip artist
- Rosa Francisca Dolors Molas Vallvé (1815–1876), Spanish Roman Catholic nun
- Roger Vallvé (1970–present), musician
