= Romano Felmang =

Italian artist (born 1941)

The Phantom by Romano Felmang

Romano Felmang (born 1941) is an Italian artist best known for his illustrations of American comic strip characters such as The Phantom and Flash Gordon.

Felmang was born in Rome. His first work, in 1962, was a Phantom story titled Kaniska, which was never published in its original form, but which gained him entry to the SPADA brothers, neighbors who published Italian comic books. He was drafted, however, before any of his stories could be published. In 1966, the SPADA brothers published his Phantom story Raiders of the Great King Tomb, and he has since drawn a large number of stories for them and for other publishers, featuring The Phantom, Flash Gordon, Rip Kirby, and Secret Agent X-9. Since 1987, he has produced many stories for SEMIC International. His work has been published in Italy, France, Norway, Denmark, Hungary, and Czechoslovakia, and in the United States he has drawn covers for Comics Revue.
