= Paul Ryan (cartoonist) =

American cartoonist (1949–2016)

- Born: September 23, 1949 Somerville, Massachusetts, U.S.
- Died: March 7, 2016 (aged 66)
- Area: Artist
- Notable works: D.P. 7 Fantastic Four; The Amazing Spider-Man; The Phantom

Paul Ryan (September 23, 1949 – March 7, 2016) was an American comic artist. He worked extensively for Marvel Comics and DC Comics on a number of super-hero comic book titles. He is best known for his 1991 to 1996 run as penciler on Fantastic Four, which represents his longest association with an individual comic book series. From 2005 until his death in 2016, Ryan penciled and inked the daily newspaper comic strip The Phantom for King Features Syndicate.

== Biography ==
=== Early years ===
Paul Ryan was born in Somerville, Massachusetts, in 1949. He attended St. Polycarp Grammar School in Somerville, and graduated from St. Mary of the Annunciation High School in 1967. He graduated from the Massachusetts College of Art in 1971 with a Bachelor of Fine Arts Degree in Graphic Design.

After graduation Ryan enlisted in the United States National Guard and was assigned to Fort Dix, New Jersey, for Basic Training and AIT (Advanced Individual Training) in automotive mechanics. He later attended Massachusetts Military Academy in Wakefield, Massachusetts, for officer training. Ryan was a member of his National Guard pistol team, studied karate and fencing in his younger days, and at one time took up archery and weight training.

As a young man, Ryan found a job in the Graphics Department of Metcalf & Eddy Engineering in Boston, where he worked for 11 years.

=== First steps in comics ===
According to a 2007 interview, "Ryan began his training [for a career in comic art] as a child, growing up in Somerville. He'd park himself in front of the television each night to watch George Reeves in the Adventures of Superman." Ryan began drawing one-page comic stories in grade school, inspired by his love of comics to create his own. He has said that as a youngster in the Silver Age, he was influenced by the work of Wayne Boring and Curt Swan on Superman. In 1961, Ryan became a big fan of the Fantastic Four of Stan Lee and Jack Kirby, having "bought the first issue at the tender age of 11." He has acknowledged that even as a youth he studied the work of Hal Foster, Sy Barry, Dan Barry, and Mac Raboy, adding "I'm pretty much influenced by anybody whose work I admire."

In 1983, in response to a general "open audition" offer from Charlton Comics, Ryan was finally prompted to write and draw his first full-scale comics story, which he titled "BREED". Charlton had recently instituted a program whereby they would publish the best of the work submitted by aspiring comic book artists in Charlton Bullseye. Payment would be in the form of 50 contributor copies of the printed piece. The artist would then have published work to show Marvel Comics or DC Comics in the hopes of landing a job with the "Big Two." Charlton accepted Ryan's story, encouraging him that a career in comics was within reach, but the title was cancelled before "BREED" saw print.

The remaining stories from Bullseye ended up in the hands of Bill Black of Americomics in Florida, and Black published "BREED" in Starmasters #1 (March 1984). This brought Ryan to the attention of comic book stores in the Boston area. When Marvel artist Bob Layton moved to Boston and needed an assistant, the employees at these stores recommended Paul Ryan to Layton. Ryan worked for Layton for a year doing his backgrounds, and through him met the editors and staff at Marvel. Layton is said to have played a vital role in Ryan's development. Ryan said that his only formal training in comics came in that 1983-1984 span, working as Bob Layton's assistant while also preparing his penciling samples for Marvel. By this time Ryan, having taken a circuitous route toward a career in comic art, was in his middle 30s.

Fantastic Four #358 (Nov. 1991), art by Paul Ryan

=== At Marvel Comics ===
Soon, Ryan was getting assignments of his own, starting with inking The Thing #27 (September 1985) and then moving on to penciling Iron Man #202, Squadron Supreme, The Eternals, and a Thor graphic novel.

In 1986, writer Mark Gruenwald and Ryan co-created D.P. 7 for Marvel's New Universe imprint. The series featured a then-uncommonly realistic view of what consequences could arise from having paranormal abilities. D.P. 7 has been called "a clear forerunner — both in tone and content — of the television series Heroes."

Ryan said that his favorite creative moment in comics was sitting down with Gruenwald and coming up with the look for D.P. 7: "At Mark’s direction we 'cast' our characters based on real people. This is something that I still do when confronted with new characters. When given a description of a character by the writer I look through various magazines for just the right look."

Rich Johnston of Bleeding Cool proclaimed D.P. 7 "a wonderful comic book, everything just seemed to gel together perfectly on that series, and on Quasar that followed it, and I was hooked. Paul had a classically clean style."

In 1987 Ryan drew The Amazing Spider-Man Annual #21 which featured the wedding of Spider-Man (Peter Parker) and Mary Jane Watson. Recalling years later his reaction to being assigned the wedding issue, Ryan admitted, "I was terrified! Excited, but knowing the historic and financial significance of this story for Marvel Comics, I couldn’t help but be a little nervous. Considering that I had only been in the business a minute and a half I should never have been given that assignment. Jim Shooter really took a chance with me. He asked. I accepted. He handed me the plot. I hope I didn’t disappoint him."

Ryan penciled the first six issues of Quasar in 1989–90, and also worked on a significant run of The Avengers. Recalling Ryan's work on the latter title, writer Jason Versaggi said that Ryan's "draft work seemed to seamlessly transition from the end of John Buscema's stints on those books in the '90s."

Other Marvel highlights included pencils for Avengers West Coast (shortly after inking John Byrne's art on several issues of that title) and Ravage 2099, a character he co-created with Stan Lee. He penciled art for Byrne's scripts on Iron Man for about a year beginning in 1991, including an arc called "The Dragon Seed Saga" which featured the Mandarin. In 1992, concurrent with comic book projects, Ryan took over the penciling on The Amazing Spider-Man Sunday comic strip written by Stan Lee, inked by Joe Sinnott, and distributed by King Features. He drew that feature for just over three years, for what might have been his largest audience of readers.

Of all his work for Marvel, Paul Ryan is most strongly associated with the Fantastic Four for his long run on their flagship title. Ryan said that when he was first offered the art assignment he actually declined, because he was reluctant to give up the Avengers to clear time in his schedule. He continued to think about the opportunity over a weekend, and finally concluded that he couldn't turn down the job of drawing his favorite Marvel title. Partnering with writer Tom DeFalco, and sometimes receiving a co-plotting credit, his first issue was #356 (Sept. 1991) and his last #414 (July 1996). He trailed only Jack Kirby and John Byrne in total number of Fantastic Four issues drawn. His run on Fantastic Four was ended abruptly by the Heroes Reborn event. Ryan recalled that he learned of his losing the F.F. and Jim Lee's taking over the title through the internet, and said, "This whole situation left a bad feeling with me toward Marvel. I was cast adrift after 11 years of loyal exclusivity."

=== At DC Comics and after ===
Shortly after Paul Ryan left Marvel, he moved over to DC Comics where he became the artist on Superman: The Man of Tomorrow and The Flash. That same year, he was one of the many creators who contributed to the Superman: The Wedding Album one-shot wherein the title character married Lois Lane. Ryan drew part of the Superman Red/Superman Blue one-shot which launched the storyline of the same name which ran through the various Superman titles. He penciled a Superman Annual and various Batman titles, as well as several fill-in assignments on other Superman titles. With writers Grant Morrison and Mark Millar, Ryan introduced the Jakeem Thunder character in The Flash vol. 2 #134 (Feb. 1998).

Paul Ryan and writer David Michelinie are the only comic book creators to have contributed to the wedding issues of both Spider-Man (Peter Parker) marrying Mary Jane Watson in The Amazing Spider-Man Annual #21 and Superman (Clark Kent) marrying Lois Lane in Superman: The Wedding Album.

"One of the greatest thrills I experienced working in comics was to be allowed to draw Superman," Ryan said about his time at DC. "To me, he was the first, best hero."

Egmont's Fantomen (Phantom) cover art by Paul Ryan

He was a contributing artist on the NASCAR/Superman custom comic and on Celebrating the Century, a stamp collecting book which DC produced for the United States Postal Service.

Ryan briefly returned to Marvel in 1999, teaming again with writer Tom DeFalco, this time on the Fantastic Five. The turn of the Millennium found Ryan working with Wildstorm, penciling one of the Left Behind graphic novels, and working with Crossgen as a fill-in artist on such titles as Ruse and Crux. Crossgen's recruitment of Ryan and other notable talent led DC Comics to consider that upstart publisher a significant threat in the comic book market.

Ryan's involvement with The Phantom began when a fan bidding on one of Ryan's eBay auctions in 2001 contacted him, and asked if he had ever considered working for a comics company outside the U.S. This fan had been an intern at Egmont Publishing, which produces The Phantom (Fantomen) comic in Sweden. Ryan told him he was interested, and was given the appropriate contact information. Soon, the publisher had samples from Ryan, and he quickly signed him on to Team Fantomen. Ryan became a regular contributor of covers and finished interior art to Fantomen for the next five years, a job which would position him well for his next major assignment.

=== The Phantom comic strip ===
The Phantom comic strip began as a weekday newspaper strip on February 17, 1936, with a color Sunday strip added in May 1939. It was originally written by creator Lee Falk, and when Falk died in 1999, Tony DePaul took over the writing duties. Paul Ryan was one of the several artists who have illustrated the character's comic strip adventures over the decades.

In 2005 then-current artist George Olesen announced his retirement. Jay Kennedy, editor-in-chief at King Features Syndicate, chose Ryan to assume the artist's role on the daily strips, beginning with those published in January of that year (Ryan had been the artist on King's Amazing Spider-Man strip a decade earlier). Then in October 2006 Graham Nolan, artist on The Phantom Sunday Strip, announced his intended departure from the series. Once again Kennedy called upon Ryan, who agreed to add the Sunday strip to his duties for King Features. His first Sunday appeared in newspapers on April 1, 2007. Ryan later wished to cut his workload and on July 31, 2011, Eduardo Barreto took over as artist for the Sunday strip. Following Barreto's sudden death in late 2011, Ryan returned to the Sunday feature briefly until a replacement, Terry Beatty, was found.

One of the many highlights of Ryan's time on The Phantom is the daily adventure that ran from August 24, 2009, until May 7, 2011. Called by DePaul in its entirety "The Death of Diana Palmer Walker", this epic storyline was considered at that time to be the longest in duration of all The Phantom newspaper plots. The recurring villain of the tale, Chatu, a.k.a. the Python, is a ruthless terrorist who seeks revenge on his nemesis by striking at someone close to the Phantom. Frew Publications later presented the entire story as "The Python Strikes Back," which comprised the 140-page issue number 1602 of their long-running reprint series The Phantom. (In May of 2021, DePaul and Manley began an adventure called To Wrack and Ruin at Gravelines, which was the first part of a much larger story that subsequently surpassed "The Death of Diana Palmer Walker" in length.)

DePaul credits Ryan with pitching the basis of another memorable story, "The Challenge", by posing the question, "What if someone challenged Guran for the right to be chief of the Bandar?" The story DePaul developed from that prompt ended with Guran still chief, but acknowledging the worthiness of his challenger, Kipawa, as a possible successor one day.

Rich Johnston praised Ryan for his artwork on The Phantom: "Here it seems he has come into his own, a richer and more luxurious style that is less tempered by the effects of Marvel or DC editorial with a greater influence from Europe."

Ryan's last Phantom strip was released on Saturday, May 28, 2016.

=== Working methods ===
Speaking about his work as a comic book penciler, Ryan described his process: "I read the stories and 'see' what it should look like in my mind, do a thumbnail sketch of the picture in my head and then go to full size drawing paper." Although known primarily for his pencil art for comic books, Ryan said that he preferred to ink his own pencils: "I have worked with some amazing inkers. Some inkers made my work look better than it was. Some other inkers... not so much. When I ink my pencils, the readers get to see what I can do."

The Phantom daily strip from 2006. Art by Paul Ryan.

On The Phantom, Ryan penciled and inked. When asked how long it takes to produce his daily comic strip, Ryan estimated "four hours to pencil a strip and three hours to ink it in, crafting lighting and shadows." Ryan began with penciling only the line work. "I work out the lighting, shadows and texture in the inking stage. I go in with the brush first and hit all the shadows and large dark areas. This helps define the page. Then I go in with a finer brush or pen to add details, texture or contour lines."

Ryan's art was characterized by a strong story-telling sense, careful attention to design and perspective, and solid knowledge of anatomy—on a strip that he at one time drew for publication 365 days a year. While Ryan kept reference books handy, he gave more credit to observation—and an artist's eye—for his knowledge of human anatomy as well as the structure of the world around us. "Whenever I'm in any situation, I'll constantly try to memorize things. I'll memorize a face, a room, and actually mentally outline everything." He also took particular notice of shadows.

Drawings of the real people in his life, such as family and friends, appeared in his comics. He said that his eye was especially drawn to the character expressed in older faces. "You see so much history in the face. And that's something I try to bring into the work."

Ryan confessed to having run around his neighborhood as a youngster with a makeshift Superman cape tied around his neck ("I got beat up a lot", he joked), and his emotional identification with comic characters continued into his professional years: "I find that while I'm illustrating a story I become so focused that I feel as if I'm [actually] in the story, taking the part of each of the characters as I draw them," Ryan said.

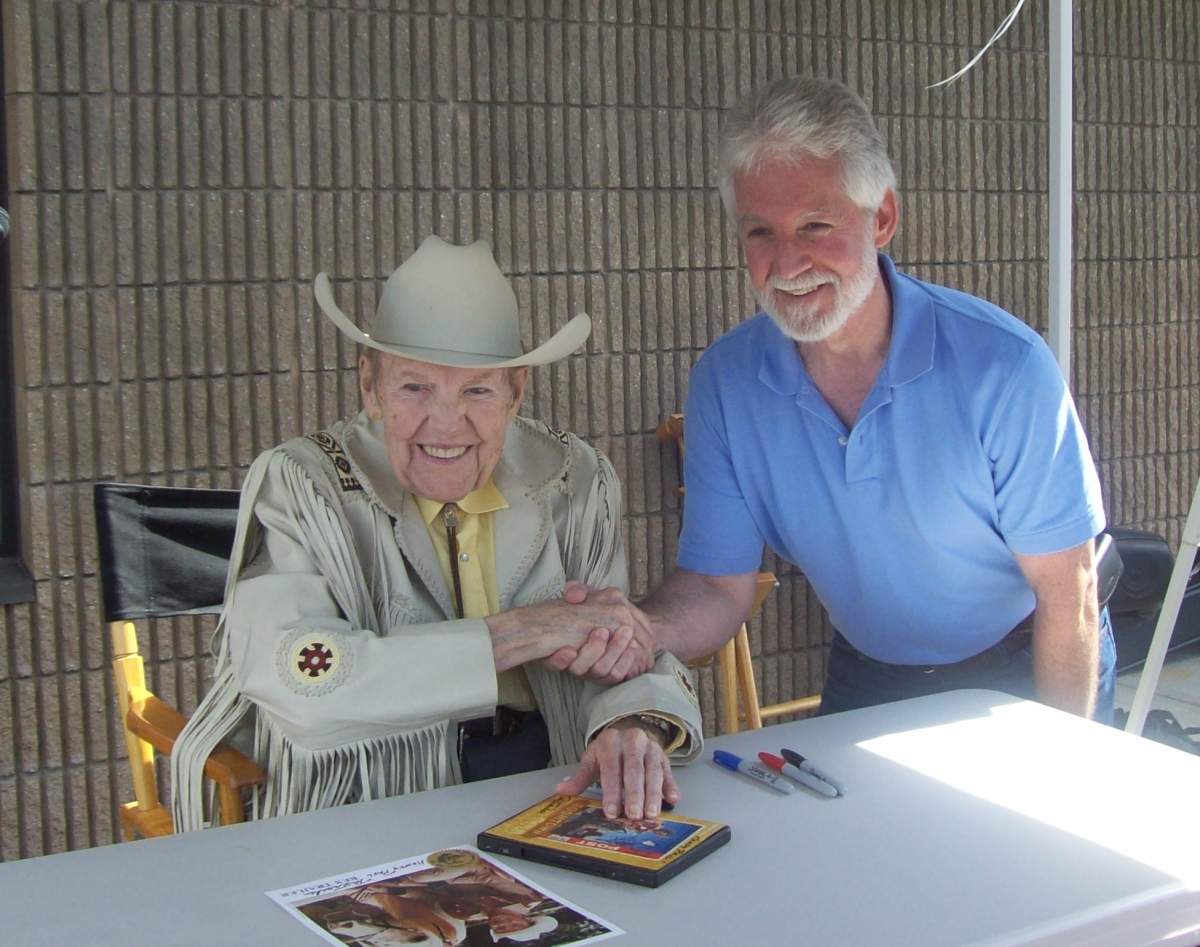
Paul Ryan meets Rex Trailer, at That's Entertainment in Fitchburg, Massachusetts, on 9/11/2011

=== Legacy, personal and professional ===
Ryan continued as the artist for The Phantom daily comic strips until his death at the age of 66. He died unexpectedly on March 7, 2016, at his home in Hudson, Massachusetts.

Tony DePaul, the writer of The Phantom, collaborated with Ryan on the strip for twelve years. He wrote of his last phone conversation with Ryan, who had called to make sure he interpreted a panel the way DePaul had intended in his script. DePaul lauded the ardent professionalism of his late partner, and stated that "Paul considered it a privilege to work on a classic character created by the great Lee Falk, in 1936. He and I thought exactly alike in that regard."

DePaul also wrote of their shared love for Montana, and of Ryan's love for horses. "Which may be why," DePaul suggested, "he was so good at drawing Hero, the Phantom’s trusty mount." DePaul posted photos of Ryan and his wife Linda Ryan enjoying a recent vacation at a ranch in Sweet Grass County, Montana.

DePaul made reference in a 2017 interview to the "magnificent work Paul did for so many years, and for way less money than he was worth"; citing an example of Ryan's best work, DePaul said "Paul’s art was especially well done in the 'Voyaging Canoe', night scenes at sea, in the fog, that can’t be easy to pull off."

The administrator of The Phantom fan site Chronicle Chamber marked his passing, and reminisced about meeting Ryan at the 2014 Supanova Con in Sydney, Australia, where he was the guest of honor at the Lee Falk Memorial Bengali Explorer’s Club dinner: "My overwhelming memory of Paul was just how great a bloke he was. He listened to everyone who wanted to talk to him, he kindly signed all the stuff that was thrown at him and he was incredibly generous and honest in the tales he told about working on The Phantom. The highlight for me was watching Paul create some Phantom artwork live. It was amazing and something I’ll never forget."

Writer Larry Hama, Ryan's friend and collaborator at both Marvel and DC Comics, praised him as "an impeccable draftsman, a solid visual storyteller, and really, really nice guy."

Hama continued, "I always knew that a plot I sent him would be drawn with a keen attention to detail, aspects of the story would be improved upon, and my mistakes would be corrected."

Mark Evanier reminisced: "Some years ago, Paul and I were going to collaborate on a new comic book based on a leftover idea of Jack Kirby's. I was disappointed when the project fell through because I'd been looking forward to working with Paul. I knew from seeing his work he could draw well but when we got into discussions, I discovered what a smart, conscientious artist he was — the kind who not only produces fine work but understands what he's doing and why. What a shame to lose a good man like that."

That's Entertainment manager Ken Carson noted the many store events at which Ryan had appeared over the span of twenty years, and reflected on his personality and wit: "He was a meticulous craftsman, but Paul enjoyed friendly banter as he sketched & signed for fans—and he had a mischievous sense of humor! He could say outlandish things with a straight face, but a sparkle in his eye would give him away."

Brendan Burford (King Features general manager, syndication) eulogized the artist: "Paul had an illustrious career in comics that spanned decades, and we at King Features are so pleased that he was able to ply his craft to our beloved PHANTOM. He belongs right alongside the other greats who have drawn the Ghost Who Walks, and he will be missed."

The King Features announcement also included some details of his personal life: "In addition to his love of storytelling through his comics and his real true passion for being a cowboy, Ryan cherished spending time with his family and was fondly referred to as 'Uncle Paul.' His passion in life was his wife, Linda, and the treasured times they shared throughout their 28 years together in marriage."

In the weeks after Ryan's death, Frew Publications declared The Phantom issue number 1748 to be a "Paul Ryan Tribute" issue. This issue was Frew's first comic book to have the interior printed in color. In addition to a full-length adventure drawn by Ryan, the issue contained photographs from his 2014 visit to Australia and several remembrances. Publisher Dudley Hogarth therein attributed the following quote to Ryan: "My heroes have always been men of action. Some of them wore a mask. Some rode a horse. Some had an animal companion. A few carried a gun. Fewer still operated from a secret cave. One hero, in particular, combined all of these elements and more. He was the Phantom! If someone had told me when I was ten years old, that I would one day be the Phantom strip artist, I would not have believed them. Those things happen to other people not to me. Life is good!"

Mike Manley was named to succeed Ryan on The Phantom beginning with the strip dated May 30, 2016. Ryan was several weeks ahead on the strip at the time of his death.

Manley wrote, "I met Paul only once that I remember clearly at a con many years back though we rubbed shoulders at Marvel on books like Quasar with me following him on that book when he left to do other books like The Avengers and The Fantastic Four. Paul left us all a great legacy to enjoy and be inspired by for the ages with his art for Marvel and his long run on the Phantom."

Manley also noted that he and Paul Ryan are listed in a small and notable group of artists who have professionally drawn the adventures of both Batman and The Phantom. The others are Jim Aparo, Terry Beatty, Don Newton, Carmine Infantino (as a ghost for Sy Barry), Joe Giella (ghosting for Bob Kane), and Graham Nolan.

== Bibliography ==
=== AC Comics ===
- Captain Paragon and the Sentinels of Justice #1 (inks over Greg Guler, letterer) (1985)
- Colt Special #1 (inks over Rick Burchett) (1985)
- Starmasters #1 (writer/artist) (1984)

=== CrossGen Comics ===
- Crux #17, 26–27, 31 (2002–2003)
- Mystic #35 (2003)
- Ruse #11, 15, 20, 25 (2002–2003)
- Solus #5 (2003)

=== DC Comics ===
- The Adventures of Superman #542, 567 (1997–1999)
- Aquaman vol. 4 #66 (2000)
- The Batman Chronicles #23 (2001)
- Batman: Gotham City Secret Files #1 (2000)
- Batman: Gotham Knights #3–4, 6–7 (2000)
- Batman: Legends of the Dark Knight #123 (1999)
- Batman: Shadow of the Bat #91, 93 (1999–2000)
- DC Universe Holiday Bash #1 (1997)
- The Flash vol. 2 #119–136 (1996–1998)
- The Flash 80-Page Giant #2 (1999)
- Green Lantern Annual #9 (2000)
- Legends of the DCU: Crisis on Infinite Earths #1 (1999)
- Legion: Science Police #1–4 (1998)
- Resurrection Man #25 (inks over Jackson Guice) (1999)
- Superboy vol. 3 #31, 41 (1996–1997)
- Superman vol. 2 #129, 136–138, Annual #10 (1997–1998)
- Superman 80-Page Giant #3 (2000)
- Superman Forever #1 (1998)
- Superman: Our Worlds at War Secret Files #1 (2001)
- Superman Red/Superman Blue #1 (1998)
- Superman Secret Files #2 (1999)
- Superman: The Man of Steel #77, Annual #5 (1996–1998)
- Superman: The Man of Tomorrow #6–14 (1996–1999)
- Superman: The Wedding Album #1 (1996)
- Tangent Comics/The Atom #1 (inks over Dan Jurgens) (1997)

=== Egmont ===
- Fantomen #25/2001, 15/2002, 22/2002, 7/2003, 14/2003, 25/2003, 8/2004, 17/2004, 18/2004, 25/2004, 3/2005, 9/2005, 4/2006, 25/2006, 16/2016

=== Image Comics ===
- C.H.I.X. That Time Forgot #1 (1998)

=== King Features Syndicate ===
- The Amazing Spider-Man comic strip Sundays (1992–1995)
- The Phantom comic strip dailies (2005–2016) and Sundays (2007–2011)

=== Lone Star Press ===
- Pantheon #10-12 (2001-2003)

=== Marvel Comics ===
- A-Next #4 (inks over Ron Frenz) (1999)
- The Amazing Spider-Man Annual #21 (1987)
- The Avengers #305–318, 320, 322, 324, 326–332 (1989–1991)
- Avengers West Coast #54–57 (inks over John Byrne), #60–63, 65–69 (1990–1991)
- Cable #3 (1993)
- D.P. 7 #1–32 (1986–1989)
- Eternals vol. 2 #12 (1986)
- Fantastic Five #1–5 (1999–2000)
- Fantastic Four #356–414 (1991–1996)
- Fantastic Four: World's Greatest Comics Magazine #9 (2001)
- Force Works #5 (1994)
- G.I. Joe a Real American Hero #85 (1989)
- Iron Man #202, 267–273, 275–279 (1986–1992)
- Iron Man vol. 3 #34, 36, Annual 2000 (2000–2001)
- J2 #5–9 (inks over Ron Lim) (1999)
- Kickers, Inc. #5 (1987)
- Marvel Comics Presents #29, 62–63, 117, 152 (1989–1994)
- Marvel Graphic Novel: I, Whom the Gods Would Destroy (Thor) (1988)
- Marvel Graphic Novel: Squadron Supreme: Death of a Universe (1989)
- Maximum Security #1–3 (inks over Jerry Ordway) (2000)
- Maximum Security: Dangerous Planet #1 (inks over Jerry Ordway) (2000)
- Nightmask #3 (inks over Alex Saviuk) (1987)
- Quasar #1–6 (1989–1990)
- Ravage 2099 #1–7 (1992–1993)
- Solo Avengers #4 (Black Knight) (1988)
- Spider-Girl Annual 1999
- Squadron Supreme #6, 9–12 (1986)
- The Thing #27, 29 (inks over Ron Wilson) (1985)
- Wild Thing #1 (penciller), #5 (inks over Ron Lim) (1999–2000)
- X-Factor #94 (1993)
- X-Force #25 (inks over Greg Capullo) (1993)

=== Tyndale House Publishers ===
- Tribulation Force #1, 3–4 (2002–2003)

Preceded by Rich Buckler	The Avengers artist 1989–1991	Succeeded by Herb Trimpe
Preceded by John Byrne	Avengers West Coast artist 1990–1991	Succeeded by Steven Butler
Preceded by John Romita Jr.	Iron Man artist 1991–1992	Succeeded by Kev Hopgood
Preceded by Al Milgrom	Fantastic Four artist 1991–1996	Succeeded by Carlos Pacheco
Preceded by Sergio Cariello	The Flash vol. 2 artist 1996–1998	Succeeded by Ron Wagner
