= Kari Leppänen =

Finnish comics artist (born 1945)

Kari Tapio Leppänen (born September 1, 1945) is a Finnish comics artist who has worked on "the Phantom" since 1979. Leppänen's career started in the magazine Sarjis. This was a magazine with only Finnish series. He wrote science fiction under the pseudonym Oskari. The Swedish comics publisher Semic became aware of his work and offered him a job as an artist on the Phantom series.
