= George Olesen =

American cartoonist

- Born: December 6, 1924 Brooklyn, New York
- Died: October 15, 2013 (aged 88) Palm City, Florida
- Area: Artist
- Notable works: The Phantom

George Olesen (December 6, 1924 – October 15, 2013) was an American comic book artist, best known for his work as a penciller on popular comic strip The Phantom. He worked with the character for around forty years, although he did not get any official credit for it until penciller Sy Barry retired and Keith Williams took over as the new inker.

Olesen also illustrated a few Phantom stories for the Scandinavian Phantom comics, which he both pencilled and inked.

During World War II Olesen served as a B-24 pilot in the Burma campaign. After the war he earned an illustration degree from the Pratt Institute.

Olesen retired in 2005, leaving Paul Ryan to take over both the pencilling and inking jobs on The Phantom. Olesen enjoyed a quiet life with his wife Rigmor, far away from the stressing deadlines he constantly had to face as a cartoonist.

Olesen died on October 15, 2013.
