= Justiniano =

American comic book artist

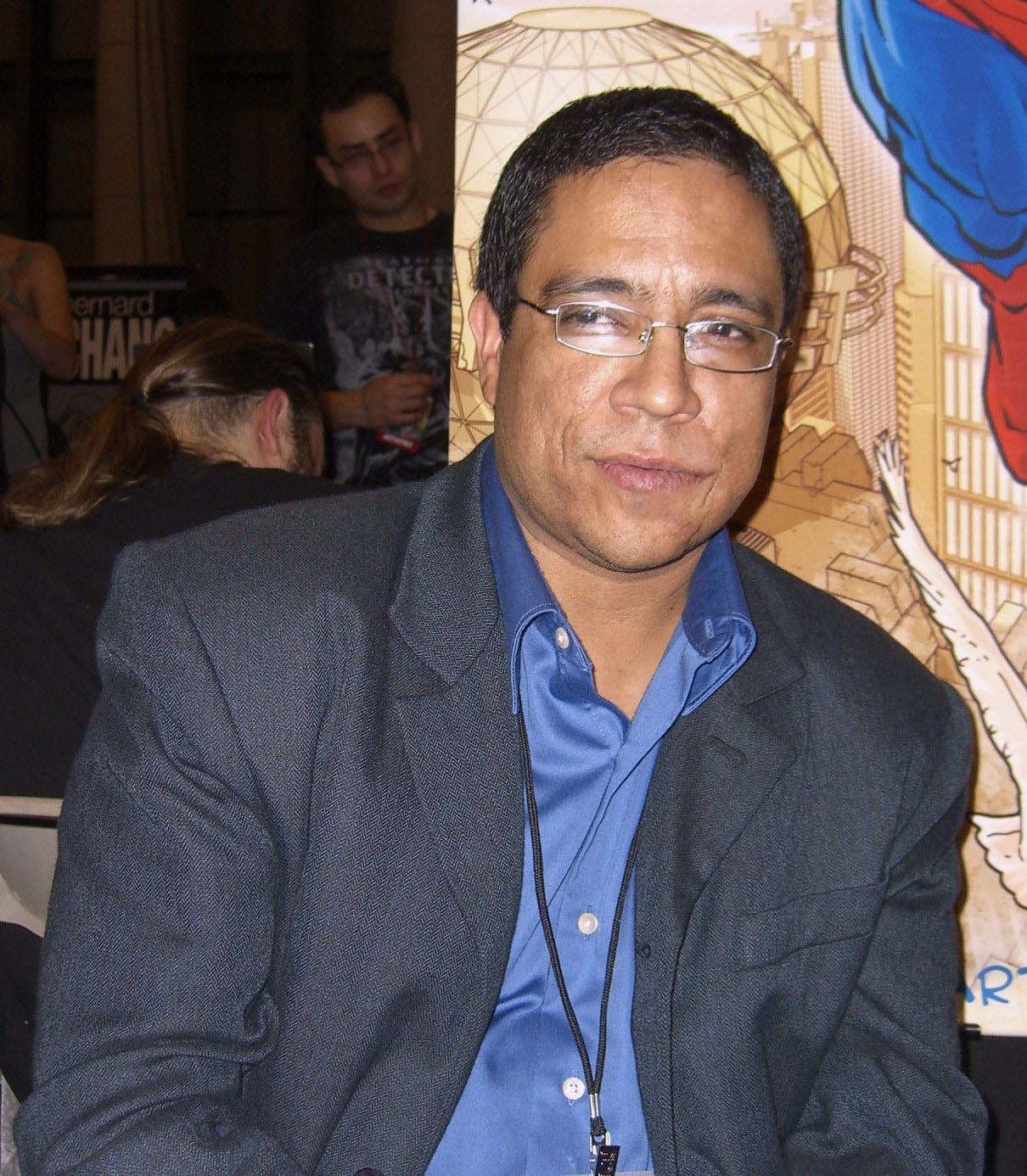
- Justiniano at the New York Comic Con in Manhattan, October 9, 2010.
- Born: Josue Rivera
- Areas: Penciller, Inker

Justiniano (born Josue Rivera) is an American comic book artist and sex offender.

His work includes the Doctor Fate feature in the 8-issue Countdown spin-off Countdown to Mystery miniseries (with the late writer Steve Gerber) from DC Comics, Evil Ernie, Chastity and The Omen for Chaos! Comics and The Titans, The Flash, Beast Boy, The Human Race, Day of Vengeance, The Creeper and 52 for DC.

He has worked with writers Brian Pulido, Geoff Johns, Ben Raab, Bill Willingham and Steve Niles.

Justiniano has done artwork on such DC titles as The Human Race, Beast Boy and Day of Vengeance. He worked on Chastity and The Omen at Chaos Comics, as well as some issues of Incredible Hulk at Marvel. He lives and works in Connecticut.

In 2011 and 2012, Justiniano was convicted on counts of possessing child pornography, pleading guilty to the charges levied against him.

== Bibliography ==
Comics work (interior pencil art) includes:

=== DC ===
- 52 #50, 52 (among other artists) (2007)
- Beast Boy, miniseries, #1-4 (2000)
- Brave and the Bold vol. 2 #31 (along with Chad Hardin) (2010)
- Countdown to Mystery, miniseries, #1-4, 6-7 (2007–08)
- Creeper, miniseries, #1-3, 6 (2006–07)
- Day of Vengeance, miniseries, #1-6 (2005)
- Day of Vengeance: Infinite Crisis Special #1 (2006)
- DCU: Brave New World (Creeper) (2006)
- Doom Patrol vol. 5 #4-5 (2010)
- Flash vol. 2 #190, 219 (2002–05)
- Human Race, miniseries, #2-4, 7 (2005)
- JLA vol. 3, JLA: Shogun of Steel (2002)
- Justice Leagues: JLA (2001)
- Legends of the DC Universe 80-Page Giant #2 (Beast Boy) (2000)
- Reign in Hell, miniseries, (Dr. Occult backup stories) #3-4 (2008)
- Spirit #26-28 (2009)
- Spirit vol. 2 #3 (2010)
- Star-Spangled War Stories #1 (Mademoiselle Marie) (along with Tom Derenick) (2010)
- Superman vol. 2, 80-Page Giant #3 (2000)
- Teen Titans: Beast Boy & Girls (2005)
- Titans #3-4 (1999)
- Young Justice 80-Page Giant #1 (1999)

=== Marvel ===
- Incredible Hulk #434 (1995)
- What If? #69 (1995)
- X-Men: Alterniverse Visions (1996)

== Personal life ==
On May 10, 2011, Justiniano was arrested on charges of first-degree possession of child pornography, in connection with a July 2010 incident in which he allegedly gave a thumb drive containing child pornography to an employee of a funeral home by mistake.

On November 2, 2012, Justiniano pleaded guilty to second-degree possession of child pornography and was sentenced to a 10-year suspended sentence after he served three years in prison, followed by 10 years of probation.
