= Day of Vengeance =

Comic book series

- Cover of Day of Vengeance #1 (June 2005), cover art by Walt Simonson.

Publication information
- Publisher: DC Comics
- Schedule: Monthly
- Format: Limited series
- Genre: Superhero
- Publication date: (limited series) June 2005 – November 2005 (Infinite Crisis Special #1) March 2006
- No. of issues: 6, with one Special
- Main character(s): Shadowpact; Captain Marvel; Black Alice; The Phantom Stranger; Shazam; The Spectre; Eclipso various DC mystics

Creative team
- Written by: Bill Willingham
- Penciller: Justiniano
- Inker: Walden Wong
- Colorist: Chris Chuckry

Collected editions
- Day of Vengeance: ISBN 1-4012-0840-1

Day of Vengeance is a six-issue comic book limited series written by Bill Willingham, with art by Justiniano and Walden Wong, published in 2005 by DC Comics.

== Publication history ==
Day of Vengeance is one of four limited series leading up to DC Comics' Infinite Crisis event. It focuses on the Spectre and other magical beings of the DC Universe, especially a hastily formed group known as the Shadowpact. The series has tie-ins to other ongoing DC Comics series, including JSA #73-75 and #77 and Blood of the Demon #6-7. It is a prelude to Infinite Crisis #1.

The events of this series were preceded by the story arc teaming Superman and Captain Marvel from Action Comics #826, The Adventures of Superman #639 and Superman #216.

== Plot summary ==
=== The seduction of the Spectre ===
Jean Loring, ex-wife of Ray Palmer (the Atom) and murderer of Sue Dibny in 2004's seven-issue limited series Identity Crisis, is transformed into a new version of the villainous Eclipso by mysterious forces. Loring escapes from her Arkham Asylum cell to unknown whereabouts. Meanwhile, the Spectre, the vengeful right hand of God, is now without a host since the revival of Hal Jordan. Eclipso persuades the Spectre that magic is evil because it breaks the laws of nature set by God. This logic makes sense to the hostless Spectre, who vows to destroy all magic.

=== The Shadowpact ===
Having witnessed his attack firsthand, the Enchantress summons Ragman to the Mist Woods to save her from the Spectre, who has just defeated and killed "seven hundred combat trained sorcerers" who were having an informal gathering. As Blackbriar Thorn provides a distraction, they retreat to the Oblivion Bar, a bar between dimensions where magically powered beings meet to trade war stories. The subject of the day at the bar is the Spectre and his attacks on magic across the world. The bartender is Jim Rook (the Nightmaster) and the bouncer is Blue Devil. When the Enchantress proclaims that the magic world needs to make a stand against the Spectre, she gets no agreement, save for Detective Chimp.

Detective Chimp reveals that the Phantom Stranger, one of several "big-gun" magicians that the Ragman believes is better suited for this type of fight, has been turned into a mouse, emphasizing the importance of fighting the Spectre. These five are joined by Nightshade as the Shadowpact and they all agree to take the fight to the Spectre. While the mystics plan this attack, the ancient wizard Shazam recruits his champion Captain Marvel in a bid against the Spectre. Also notable is that the other "big-guns" mentioned by the patrons in the bar were Doctor Fate and Madame Xanadu. Both have already been disabled by the Spectre, Doctor Fate being imprisoned in the dimension within his helmet and Madame Xanadu having been blinded by the Spectre, disabling her abilities to interpret magic.

=== The first battle ===
Through the Enchantress, the group, later named the Shadowpact, learn that the Spectre was being seduced and corrupted by Eclipso. They plan what is essentially a suicide mission to find the Spectre (and Eclipso), attack Eclipso with overwhelming surprise and numbers and to kill her, hoping to free the Spectre before he turns on them. As the Enchantress, Blue Devil, Ragman and Nightmaster teleport in, they happen on Captain Marvel fighting a duel of magic vs. spirit, which gives them the time and a chance to try to defeat Eclipso while the Spectre is distracted. Hoping to give Captain Marvel more time to hold off the Spectre (which gives them more time to defeat Eclipso), the Enchantress siphons magical energy first from herself; then from mystics around the world, including heroes such as Alan Scott, Zatanna, the Phantom Stranger (still in mouse form); villains like Blackbriar Thorn; and finally, ordinary mortals with little magic power, adding to Captain Marvel's own magical power. Meanwhile, Detective Chimp and Nightshade work on a backup plan by trying to bring back Black Alice, a girl with the power to steal another's magical abilities for a short period of time, leaving her target powerless. The Shadowpact defeats Eclipso when Blue Devil skewers Eclipso with his Trident of Lucifer, while Captain Marvel gains the upper hand over the Spectre, thanks to the tens of thousands of magic users supporting him. However, the strain of gathering such immense quantities of magic drives the Enchantress temporarily insane, and she releases her link to Captain Marvel to battle her own teammates. Captain Marvel's strength fades, and he is barely defeated by the Spectre. The Spectre, who is now heavily drained, rescues a stunned Eclipso, and Eclipso uses the last of her power to fly both of them away to safety. Blue Devil knocks the Enchantress out, and the Shadowpact return to the Oblivion Bar with Captain Marvel to regroup, surprised to be alive, and amazed to have temporarily beaten back the Spectre.

=== The second plan ===
The Shadowpact, along with Black Alice, decide on their next plan of attack: they will kill the Spectre and defeat Eclipso before she can complete her war on magic by using Black Alice's ability to steal powers. The plan reaches a snag, however, when a powerless Spectre is revealed to be an empty spirit who cannot be harmed. During her brief possession of the Spectre's powers, Black Alice uses them to help Nightshade send Eclipso into a perpetual orbit around the Sun, which weakens her power.

Captain Marvel, meanwhile, has returned to the Rock of Eternity, where the wizard Shazam reveals that he is ready to face the Spectre. The restored Spectre travels to the Rock of Eternity to battle the wizard Shazam, changing Captain Marvel back into Billy Batson, his alter ego, to keep him out of his way. The Phantom Stranger, returning to his human form, uses his powers to allow the Shadowpact and Black Alice to watch the battle between Shazam and the Spectre from Earth. After it appears that Shazam has beaten his opponent, the Spectre revives himself, drains the wizard of his powers, and kills him. The Rock of Eternity begins to disintegrate, and travels through several dimensions as it does so, eventually appearing in the sky above Gotham City before it explodes into "a billion pieces".

=== Conclusion ===
The destruction of the Rock frees an untold number beings of evil magic back into the world, among them the "living" embodiments of the Seven Deadly Sins, who were formerly trapped in stone statues in Shazam's throne room. The scarab belonging to the original Blue Beetle, which Shazam had acquired from his successor, Ted Kord, lands in El Paso, Texas. Billy Batson, unable to remember his magic word, is seen falling from the Rock above Gotham City; the scene leads directly into Infinite Crisis #1. The Shadowpact, meanwhile, agrees to continue the fight, but will do so without Black Alice, who, as she is still a teenager, plans to return home.

== Day of Vengeance: Infinite Crisis Special #1 — "The Ninth Age of Magic" ==
In Day of Vengeance: Infinite Crisis Special #1, Zatanna leads a group of magical heroes to rebuild the Rock of Eternity, as the Shadowpact recover the Seven Deadly Sins of Man. Meanwhile above Earth, Nabu fights the Spectre. The Spectre kills Nabu, but the severity of this action is noticed by the Presence, who then sends the Spectre into a new host, Crispus Allen, as punishment for his actions.

After construction of the Rock is completed, Captain Marvel is told that he must remain in the Rock to keep it, and the forces contained within, stable. Nightshade is captured by Felix Faust on the orders of the Secret Society of Super Villains. The heroes are told by the dying Nabu that the Ninth Age of Magic has ended and that the Tenth Age will soon begin. Before entombing himself into the Rock, Captain Marvel hurls Nabu's helmet from the Rock at the suggestion of Detective Chimp, letting fate decide who will become the next Doctor Fate.

== Collected editions ==
The series and other comics have been collected into a trade paperback:

- Day of Vengeance (collects Day of Vengeance #1-6, Action Comics #826, The Adventures of Superman #639 and Superman #216, 224 pages, December 2005, ISBN 1-4012-0840-1).

The one-shot special was collected in Infinite Crisis Companion (ISBN 1-4012-0922-X).
