= Stan-hattan Project =

The Stan-hattan Project was a writing workshop conducted as a joint venture by Marvel Comics and New York University (NYU)'s Department of Dramatic Writing between 1995 and 1996, whose aim was to develop new writing talent for the comic book publisher and to provide practical training and professional opportunities for students at the university. The name is a portmanteau of Marvel Comics editor Stan Lee and the Manhattan Project (the World War II program that developed the first atomic bomb).

Graduates of the program, which Marvel editor James Felder oversaw, were given access to Marvel Comics staff and the chance to see some of their work published. Felder chose NYU because he had gone to school there as well as taught classes in the Tisch School of the Arts's Dramatic Writing Department.

New York University students involved in the project who went on to become comic book professionals include Joe Kelly, Brian K. Vaughan and Ben Raab. Joe Kelly went on to write for issues of Deadpool comic and Daredevil comic story lines. Ben Raab went on to write Excalibur, a New Mutants limited series, and two issues of Daredevil.
