= Abbott and Costello Meet the Killer, Boris Karloff =

1949 horror comedy film directed by Charles Barton

- Theatrical release poster
- Directed by: Charles Barton
- Screenplay by: Hugh Wedlock, Jr. Howard Snyder; John Grant
- Story by: Hugh Wedlock Jr. Howard Snyder
- Produced by: Robert Arthur
- Starring: Bud Abbott; Lou Costello; Boris Karloff
- Cinematography: Charles Van Enger
- Edited by: Edward Curtiss
- Music by: Milton Schwarzwald
- Production company: Universal-International
- Distributed by: Universal-International
- Release date: August 22, 1949 (United States)
- Running time: 84 minutes
- Country: United States
- Language: English
- Budget: $744,245
- Box office: $1,850,000

Abbott and Costello Meet the Killer, Boris Karloff (Note: On screen title is Bud Abbott Lou Costello Meet the Killer Boris Karloff and the film poster title is Bud Abbott and Lou Costello Meet the Killer, Boris Karloff.) is a 1949 horror comedy film directed by Charles Barton and starring Abbott and Costello and Boris Karloff.

In 1956, the film was re-released by Realart Pictures as a double feature with Abbott and Costello Meet Frankenstein.

The film is set in a hotel. Following the murder of a prominent lawyer within the hotel, the hotel's bellboy is kept in custody at his room. The other suspects in the murder case manipulate him into signing a false confession, and then try to eliminate him. Meanwhile, the corpses of two more victims are found hidden in the bellboy's closet.

== Plot ==
Prominent criminal attorney Amos Strickland checks into the Lost Caverns Resort Hotel. His murdered body is later discovered by the bellboy, Freddie Phillips, who is implicated in the crime. Casey Edwards, the house detective, tries to clear Freddie, but Inspector Wellman and Sgt. Stone keep him in custody at his hotel room 'on the state'.

Strickland's secretary Gregory Millford and seven of Strickland's former clients happen to be at the resort, and they are all suspects. These former clients are Swami Talpur, Angela Gordon, Mrs. Hargreave, T. Hanley Brooks, Lawrence Crandall, Mrs. Grimsby and Mike Relia.

The former clients gather for a meeting and decide that they must conceal their pasts and that Freddie must take the blame for the murder. They trick Freddie into signing a confession, and then want him dead. Angela tries to seduce him, but the police stop her when they fear she has poisoned the champagne, then the Swami attempts to hypnotize him into committing suicide but his stupidity saves him. The bodies of Relia and the secretary Gregory Millford are found in Freddie's closet, and he and Casey try to move them and hide them.

Freddie and the two police officers, in an attempt to draw out the real killer, inform everyone that Freddie is in possession of a blood-stained handkerchief found at the murder scene. Soon afterwards, several attempts to kill Freddie are made, including gunshots at the window of his booby-trapped room, and locking him in a steam cabinet. Eventually Freddie hears a voice that calls him to bring the handkerchief to the Lost Cavern. There he meets up with a masked figure who offers to save him from the hole he has just fallen into in exchange for the handkerchief. Freddie makes the mistake of telling the mysterious figure that he left it in his room. He is left in the hole, but is eventually rescued by the two police officers.

Back at the hotel, everyone has gathered together and Sgt. Stone returns with some muddy shoes that belong to Melton, the hotel manager, which proves that he was the one in the caverns with Freddie. His motive for the murder was that he and Millford, Strickland's secretary, were blackmailing the owner, Mr. Crandell. What the blackmail was for is never explained. When Strickland found out he came to investigate, so Melton killed him with a gun he stole from Relia. Millford then sent down the former clients to use as decoys for the police, but Melton killed Relia and Millford to cover it all up. He attempts to escape through a window, but is caught by a booby trap previously set by Freddie, the latter forgetting it was previously there.

== Cast ==
- Bud Abbott as Casey Edwards
- Lou Costello as Freddie Phillips
- Boris Karloff as Swami Talpur
- Lenore Aubert as Angela Gordon
- Gar Moore as Jeff Wilson
- Donna Martell as Betty Crandall
- Alan Mowbray as Melton
- James Flavin as Inspector Wellman
- Roland Winters as T. Hanley Brooks
- Nicholas Joy as Amos Strickland
- Mikel Conrad as Sgt. Stone
- Morgan Farley as Gregory Milford
- Victoria Horne as Mrs. Hargreave
- Percy Helton as Abernathy
- Claire Du Brey as Mrs. Grimsby
- Harry Hayden as Lawrence Crandall
- Vincent Renno as Mike Relia

== Production ==
It was filmed from February 10 through March 26, 1949.

The original script, titled Easy Does It, was written with actor-comedian Bob Hope in mind. However, Universal then purchased the rights and reworked it for Abbott and Costello.

The role eventually played by Boris Karloff in the film was originally a female character named Madame Switzer in the final shooting script which was then titled, Abbott and Costello Meet the Killers. Five days before shooting, Karloff was hired and the character was changed to a swami.

After filming was completed, Costello was bedridden for several months due to a relapse of rheumatic fever, which he originally battled in 1943. As a result, the duo would not make another film together until one year later, 1950's Abbott and Costello in the Foreign Legion.

Boris Karloff's inclusion in the title of the film seems evident from the movie poster, which includes a comma between the words "Killer" and "Boris Karloff", but the actual credits in the film show no such distinction and could be interpreted as "Abbott and Costello Meet the Killer", followed by the co-star credit "Boris Karloff."

== Alternate versions ==
In Australia and New Zealand, every scene with a corpse was removed prior to distribution. The film was banned in Denmark due to the scene where corpses play cards.

== Routines ==
The Changing Room: where Costello keeps finding a dead body and when he tries to show it to Abbott (or anyone else), it is no longer there. This comic device was first used in Hold That Ghost (1941) and later in Abbott and Costello Meet the Mummy (1955).

== Home media ==
This film was released twice on DVD, on The Best of Abbott and Costello Volume Three, on August 3, 2004, and again on October 28, 2008 as part of Abbott and Costello: The Complete Universal Pictures Collection.
