= JLA: Shogun of Steel =

DC comic book

Publication information
- Publisher: Elseworlds (DC Comics)
- Format: One-shot
- Genre: Superhero
- Publication date: April 2002
- No. of issues: 1
- Main character: Justice League

Creative team
- Written by: Ben Raab
- Penciller: Justiniano
- Inker: Justiniano
- Letterer: Bill Oakley
- Colorist: Sherilyn Van Valkenburgh
- Editor: Joey Cavalieri

JLA: Shogun of Steel is a prestige format comic book one-shot from DC Comics's Elseworlds imprint, published in 2002. It was written by Ben Raab, with art by Justiniano.

== Plot ==
A rocketship from an exploding planet Krypton lands not in Smallville, but rather war-torn 14th century feudal Japan. When the baby from Krypton grows into a man, Hoshi, he is convinced by a ragtag band of warriors - Elseworlds versions of the Flash, Hawkman, and Batgirl, among others - to join a rebellion against the oppressive and cunning "Shogun of Steel".
