= Hans Lindahl =

Swedish comic book artist

- Born: October 15, 1954 (age 72)
- Areas: Writer, Penciller, Inker
- Notable works: The Phantom

Hans Lindahl (born October 15, 1954) is a Swedish comic book artist, best known for his work on the series The Phantom. His work on the Phantom has been published in countries like Sweden, Norway, Finland, Denmark, England, Australia and Brazil.

== Biography ==
Cover to Swedish Fantomen # 8 (2003), which won the readers' award for Best Cover of the Year in Norway . Art by Hans Lindahl. Published by Egmont.

Lindahl started out as a Phantom artist in 1982, with the story The Zombie League. His cinematic, detailed style of drawing immediately grew popular with readers, and today, he is probably the most popular artist drawing for the Swedish Phantom comic (Fantomen in Swedish). Hans, or "Hasse"/"Hazze", as fans have nicknamed him, is known for a methodic approach to his work, often spending up to 10 weeks to finish the artwork for a story.

Hans also paints covers for the magazines, many of which have won the readers' award for Best Cover of the Year.

In 1998, Hans also started to write Phantom stories. He is responsible for introducing several new, important villains to the Phantom mythos, like "The Black Carnation".
