= Keith Williams (comics) =

American comics artist

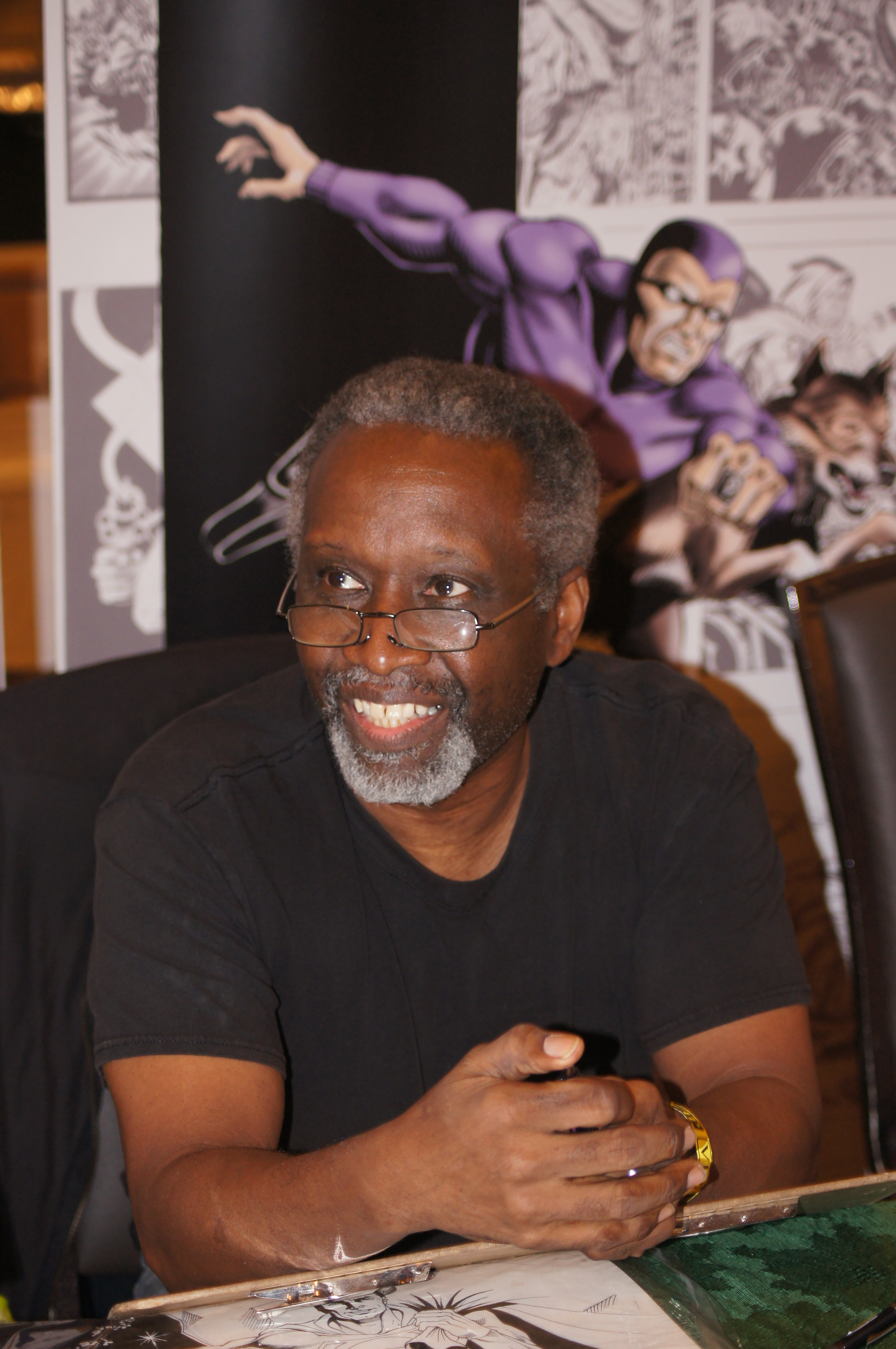
- Williams in 2019
- Born: September 16, 1957 (age 69)
- Area: Artist
- Notable works: The Phantom, Superman
- Awards: Inkwell Awards Above & Beyond Award 2023; Inkwell Awards Joe Sinnott Hall of Fame 2025

Keith Williams (born September 16, 1957) is an American comic book and comic strip artist. He is best known for illustrating The Phantom for over a decade together with George Olesen. He also worked on Superman with John Byrne.

Since Paul Ryan took over the Phantom strip, Williams has mainly worked in comic books, like Kolchak: The Night Stalker, Buckaroo Banzai and Domino Lady from Moonstone Books.

In 2023, Williams was awarded the Inkwell Awards Above & Beyond Award for his outstanding involvement in the Joe Sinnott Inking Challenge and the Joe Sinnott Tribute Challenge. In 2025, he was inducted into the Inkwell Awards Joe Sinnott Hall of Fame.
