= Secret Agent X-9 (1945 serial) =

1945 film by Ray Taylor, Lewis D. Collins

- Theatrical release poster
- Directed by: Lewis D. Collins; Ray Taylor
- Written by: Joseph O'Donnell; Harold Channing Wire; Patricia Harper; Dashiell Hammett (comic strip)
- Produced by: Morgan Cox
- Starring: Lloyd Bridges; Keye Luke; Jan Wiley; Victoria Horne; Samuel S. Hinds; Cy Kendall
- Cinematography: Maury Gertsman; Ernest Miller
- Edited by: Norman A. Cerf (supervisor); Irving Birnbaum; Jack Dolan; Alvin Todd; Edgar Zane
- Music by: Milton Rosen; Paul Sawtell
- Distributed by: Universal Pictures
- Release date: July 24, 1945
- Running time: 13 chapters (246 minutes)
- Country: United States
- Language: English

Secret Agent X-9 is a 1945 Universal movie serial based on the comic strip Secret Agent X-9. It was the second serial with this name, the first was released by Universal in 1937.

== Plot ==
On a neutral island in the Pacific called Shadow Island (above the island of Formosa), run by American gangster Lucky Kamber, both sides in World War II attempt to control the secret of element 722, which can be used to create synthetic aviation fuel.

== Cast ==
- Lloyd Bridges as Phil Corrigan aka Secret Agent X-9
- Keye Luke as Ah Fong, Chinese agent
- Jan Wiley as Lynn Moore, Australian agent
- Victoria Horne as Nabura, villainous Japanese agent
- Samuel S. Hinds as Solo
- Cy Kendall as Lucky Kamber, self-proclaimed governor of the neutral Shadow Island
- Jack Overman as Marker
- George Lynn as Bach, one of Nabura's henchmen
- Clarence Lung as Takahari, one of Nabura's henchmen
- Benson Fong as Dr. Hakahima
- Arno Frey as Kapitan Grut, Nazi captain
- Ferdinand Munier as Papa Pierre Dupray
- Ann Codee as "Mama Pierre" Dupray
- Edward Howard as Drag Dorgan

== Production ==
Secret Agent X-9 is based on the comic strip Secret Agent X-9 by Dashiell Hammett, Leslie Charteris and others. It was Universal's last comic strip adaptation (from 1936 to 1945, Universal made almost as many serial adaptations of comic strips as both of their rivals, Columbia and Republic, combined). The serial reuses footage and Frank Skinner's score from Universal's Gung Ho! (1943).

=== Stunts ===
- Eddie Parker doubling Lloyd Bridges
- John Daheim doubling Benson Fong

== Chapter titles ==
1. Torpedo Rendezvous
2. Ringed by Fire (or "The Flaming Lake" per the on screen teaser card)
3. Death Curve
4. Floodlight Murder
5. Doom Downgrade
6. Strafed by a Zero
7. High Pressure Deadline
8. The Dropping Floor
9. The Danger Point
10. Japanese Burial
11. Fireworks for Deadmen
12. Big Gun Fusillade
13. Zero Minute

_{Source:}
