= Rolf Gohs =

Swedish comic creator (1933–2020)

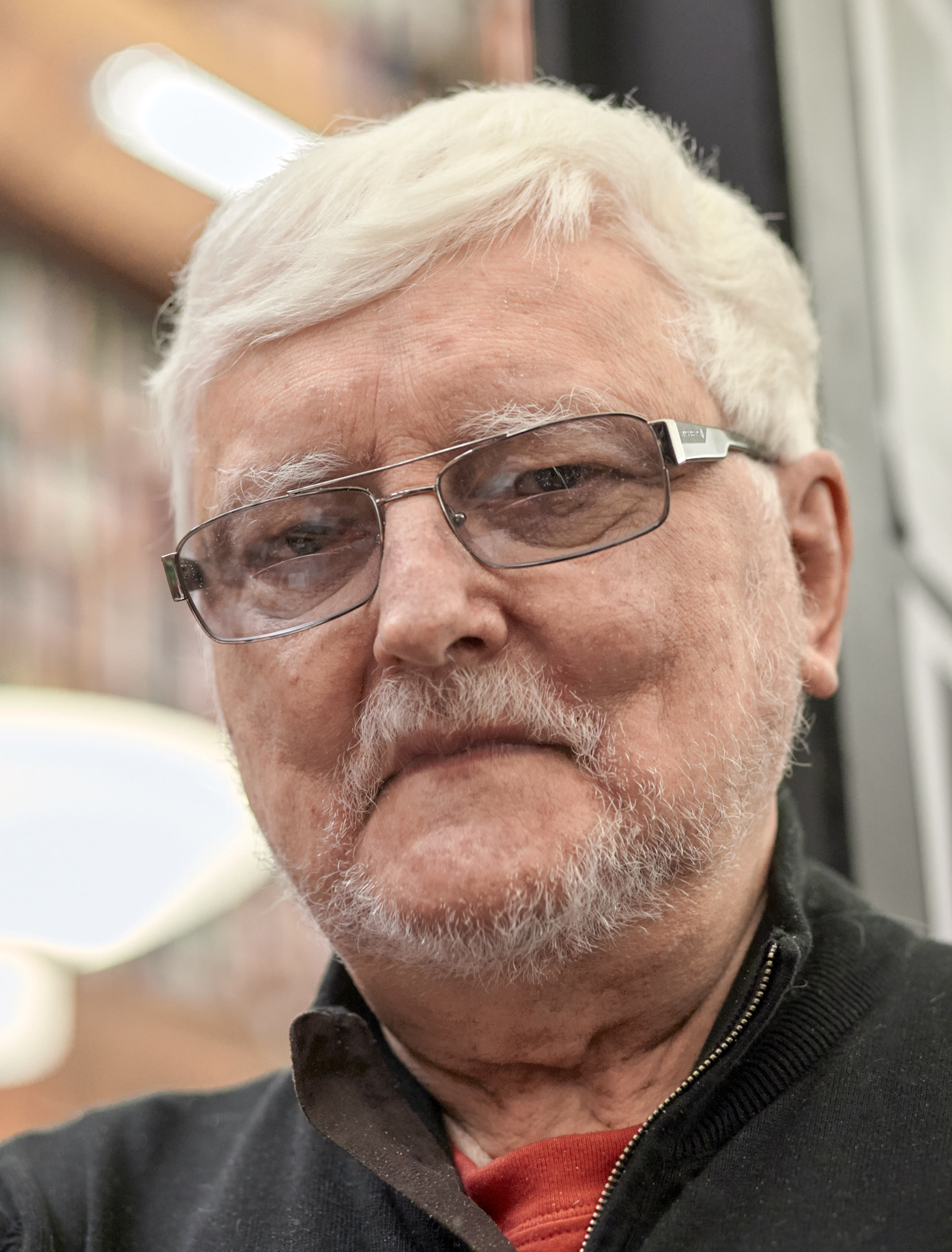
Rolfh Gohs, 2008

Rolf Ernst Gohs (26 October 1933 – 23 August 2020) was a Swedish comic creator. He was born in Estonia but moved to Sweden in 1946.

Acclaimed mostly for his artwork, Gohs usually writes his own stories as well. Early works such as Mannen från Claa (The Man from Claa) and Dödens Fågel (The Bird of Death) were well received. In 1957, he began to produce covers for the Swedish "Fantomen" comic book and also produced some interior art. Today, he is probably best known for his cover paintings. As Sweden's most prominent comic book cover artist, Gohs has produced covers featuring some of the most well-known comic characters from all over the world. Many of his works have been published outside Sweden.

Swedish Fantomen album from 1994. Art by Rolf Gohs.

In 1969, Gohs created his most famous comic, Mystiska 2:an (The Mysterious Two) about two young teenagers in Stockholm. Sometimes the stories were pure adventure style, at other times more of social realism. Mystiska 2:an was published irregularly in comic books and album form for almost twenty years. However, a 1980s story where one of the young boys fell in love with a grown-up man, caused some controversy on the Swedish comic book arena, and apparently meant the end of the feature (as well as the recently created magazine Comet, in which it was published).

Since then, Gohs produced a comic book story about the legendary Children's Crusade directly for the Swedish Phantom comic book.
