= Cryptopia =

Former cryptocurrency exchange in New Zealand

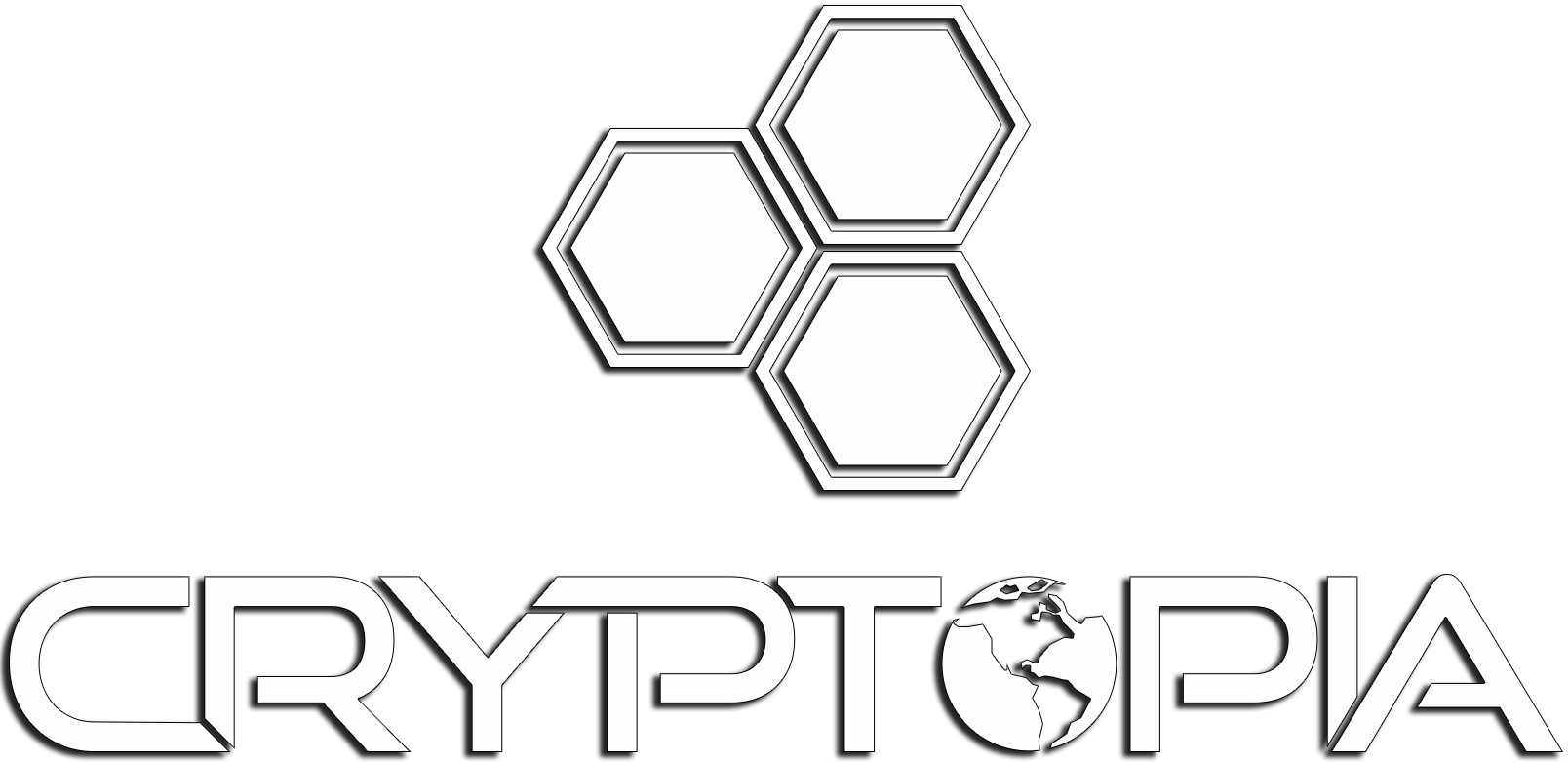
- Industry: Cryptocurrency
- Founded: 2014; 12 years ago
- Founder: Rob Dawson; Adam Clark
- Defunct: May 14, 2019 (in liquidation)
- Fate: Liquidated
- Headquarters: Christchurch, New Zealand
- Services: Cryptocurrency exchange, cryptocurrencies
- Number of employees: 100 (peak)
- Website: www.cryptopia.co.nz

Cryptopia was an international cryptocurrency exchange based in Christchurch, New Zealand. Founded in 2014 by Rob Dawson and Adam Clark, it was among the earliest cryptocurrency services started in the country, and was responsible for launching the first stablecoin pegged to the New Zealand dollar. Cryptopia experienced substantial growth in 2017 from 30,000 users to over 1.4 million by 2018. At its peak in late 2010s, Cryptopia was one of the top 100 cryptocurrency exchanges by trading volume, reportedly outpacing that of the New Zealand Stock Exchange, and went on to operate in 900 currencies.

In early 2018, Cryptopia began experiencing issues due to its rapid growth, including internal friction among management, resignations, and subsequent allegations of a toxic workplace culture. The company temporarily suspended new account creation and froze trading in Dogecoin and Litecoin, claiming an inability to handle the influx of new trades and citing security concerns. Further, the NZDT stablecoin was put on hold after ASB Bank closed the accounts associated with it, halting deposits and forcing customers to withdraw remaining NZDT funds. Clark then resigned due to burnout and a deteriorating relationship with Dawson, including allegations by his wife that a Cryptopia staff member had sexually harassed her. Later that year, Dawson resigned after feeling forced out by the incoming CEO Alan Booth. Dawson appointed his own father as sole director, who negotiated Booth out of the company, enabling Dawson to return.

In January 2019, Cryptopia was the target of a high-profile theft resulting in the loss of approximately 10% of its cryptocurrency assets, then worth NZ$24M. The incident has been described as one of the biggest thefts in New Zealand history, and was widely reported by media outlets in New Zealand and cryptocurrency news outlets internationally.

In the months following the incident, Cryptopia continued operating but suffered a substantial drop in trading activity, with security concerns and unresolved losses souring public confidence in the exchange. In May 2019, the company began the process of liquidation. Due to the scale of the theft and the relative infancy of cryptocurrency law at the time, Cryptopia was subject to an expensive and drawn-out legal process to resolve its obligations to account holders who lost cryptocurrency in the theft, which is ongoing as of 2025. The first round of Bitcoin and Dogecoin distributions to victims began in December 2024, with more than 10,000 verified account holders refunded NZ$400M worth of cryptocurrency.

The Cryptopia theft incident was the catalyst for Ruscoe v. Cryptopia, in which the New Zealand High Court held that cryptocurrency is a form of property, marking the first time in a Commonwealth country where cryptocurrency has been legally challenged as such.

== History ==
=== 2014–2016: Founding and early years ===
Cryptopia was founded in Christchurch, New Zealand in 2014 by software developers Rob Dawson and Adam Clark. The pair had become friends after previously working at a different company, and started the project as a hobby, inspired by the negative experiences they had on other exchanges.

In late 2016 the project become more serious, and Dawnson and Clark later decided to fully invest their savings and quit their jobs to focus on the company full-time.

=== 2017: NZDT stablecoin and rapid growth ===
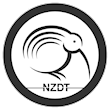
The logo for NZDT

In May 2017, Cryptopia announced it would issue the first stablecoin tethered to the New Zealand dollar. It was initially named NZed, but was traded and popularly known as NZDT or 'New Zealand Dollar Token.' In 2018, trading of the token was put on hold after ASB Bank, who had been providing banking services to enable the coin, grew concerned about regulatory issues and an inability to verify account identity and activity. ASB proceeded to shutdown accounts, and Cryptopia users were instructed to withdraw their NZDT assets.

Cryptopia had intended to resume NZDT trading in 2019, claiming they had secured the support of an unnamed smaller bank, and consulted with government and regulators on the project.

In 2017, 25% of Cryptopia was acquired by Intranel, a tech and startup specialist that Clark had previously worked at. As part of the deal, the company expanded its development team and moved to a new premises. The exchanged grew to approximately 1.4 million users by January 2018. By the end of the year, Cryptopia had over 400 coins listed and traded over $1M in volume a day, which was substantial for the crypto market at the time.

=== 2018: growth issues and management disputes ===
Cryptopia activity reportedly outpaced the trade volume of the New Zealand Stock Exchange, with the company operating in 900 currencies. Later that year, the company opened an office in London for 24-hour service. At its peak, Cryptopia had 100 employees including contractors.

Dawson and Clark's relationship suffered during this time. Clark's wife, who worked at the company in customer support, alleged that a staff member close to Dawson had sexually harassed her by drawing penises on her car using a marker that could not be removed. She had also been resentful of Dawson's decisions regarding staff and salaries. In February 2018, Clark was "burned out" and resigned from his directorship and job at Cryptopia, but retained shares. The company appointed Alan Booth as their new chief executive, who had formerly run the Canterbury Aero Club.

In early 2018, Cryptopia froze Dogecoin and Litecoin trading. Later, users claimed over 100 markets had been disabled, with some threatening to start a class action lawsuit, prompting Booth to defend the company.

In mid 2018, Booth advised Dawson to take a holiday to avoid burnout. Upon returning, Dawson discovered his salary had been stopped and his desk was replaced while he was away on a trip. Dawson resigned, believing Booth and Intranel did not value his contribution. He appointed his father, Pete Dawson, as sole director, who conducted a review which found Booth was "ineffectual." Booth left Cryptopia following a NZ$400,000 negotiation, and Dawson returned to the company. Dawson later claimed Intranel had been destabilising the business, a claim which the company denied.

In late 2018, American businessman John Gotts approached Cryptopia, interested in purchasing the exchange, describing it as "large but messy" and wanting to conform it to US standards for a wider international appeal. Gotts proposal required Intranel be removed as contractors. In November, Dawson met with Intranel staff in a short meeting to tell them their services were no longer required. The decision prompted some Cryptopia staff to look for other jobs, and created a toxic atmosphere. Before a deal was closed, Dawson's relationship with Gotts dissolved, after Gotts told staff they were "terrible" and would "all be sacked." A deal did not go through; Gotts threatened legal charges against Dawson, including extraditing him to the US, before relenting. In February 2019, Gotts published an article on the "death of crypto."

By the end of 2018, Cryptopia had experienced a drop in trading volume, but was still operating at a viable rate.

== Cryptocurrency theft ==
On January 14, 2019, Dawson was called back into the Cryptopia office at 6:30 pm, after a staff member noticed suspicious activity in the company hot wallet, indicating a private key had been compromised. At 7:40 pm the Cryptopia site went into maintenance mode and the platform was shut down to further trading. The Cryptopia headquarters on Colombo Street were locked down by police the following day. In the following weeks, the theft continued, with a substantial amount of Ethereum and other ERC-20 tokens siphoned from 17,000 accounts.

In total, an estimated 10% of Cryptopia's cryptocurrency assets were stolen, affecting up to 900,000 users. Blockchain infrastructure firm Elementus estimated that the value of the cryptocurrency was around NZ$24M at the time it was taken. It has been described as one of the biggest "heists" in New Zealand history, and one of the largest known thefts in the country.

=== Internal sabotage theory ===
Some of those involved in Cryptopia, including both Clark and Dawson, have argued that the theft could have been an inside job perpetrated by a disgruntled employee. Clark noted that the thief had not taken some of the untraceable cryptocurrency, had deleted logs, and appeared to "know where everything is", suggesting it was someone who wanted to harm the company rather than steal money. Dawson has raised a similar case, arguing that the way the coins were moved was "amateurish" and inconsistent with someone trying to cleanly steal funds.

=== FBI investigation ===
According to an investigation by Stuff, the Federal Bureau of Investigation helped investigate the Cryptopia incident, and a specialist FBI agent had flown into Christchurch in relation to the case. Some have argued this suggests the incident has an international origin. It was later confirmed that the New Zealand police had worked with the FBI and international experts as part of their investigation.

=== Exit scam allegation ===
Following the theft, some cryptocurrency experts and commentators investigated wallets owned by Cryptopia, and noted millions of dollars' worth of Ethereum had been moved prior to the incident, arguing that it may have been part of a wider exit scam. However, subsequent investigations into the matter by police and the High Tech Crime Unit did not substantiate these claims.

== Liquidation and legal disputes ==
Cryptopia continued operations until May 2019. Trading on the platform had substantially dropped following the theft incident, likely due to low confidence in the security of the exchange, however liquidator reports claim the exchange had 2.2 million accounts. The company was put into liquidation in New Zealand and awarded bankruptcy protection in the US, owing NZ$4.2M in addition to stolen cryptocurrency assets. Due to the size of the theft and the infancy and complexity of international cryptocurrency regulation and law, the process of liquidation and reimbursement has cost millions and spanned over several years. The liquidation process is being handled by Grant Thornton.

In 2021, Grant Thornton filed recovery actions in Singapore, Malaysia, and the United States, as part of an ongoing effort to recover stolen assets. Liquidators also won four court cases in the US to obtain information from four exchanges.

In 2023, Cryptopia was approved to cover NZ$5M costs by converting some of its cryptocurrency assets. It was also reported that less than a quarter of account holders had followed the process to claim Bitcoin holdings, while just a third had claimed Dogecoin assets.

In March 2024, liquidators Grant Thornton revealed they would begin returning cryptocurrency assets to some account holders, in the first round of distributions. In mid December, NZ$400M worth of Dogecoin and Bitcoin was refunded to 10,000 verified account holders, with many receiving around 85 - 90% of their holdings dated to 2019. An additional "top-up" phase, using unclaimed cryptocurrency, is expected to cover the additional losses.

=== Ruscoe v. Cryptopia ===
In 2020, the New Zealand High Court held that cryptocurrency is a digital asset and a form of property, and is capable of being held in a trust. The decision may have further implications for the distinction between "pure information" and "digital assets", and marks one of the first cases in the Commonwealth where cryptocurrency has been legally defined as such. This also meant that the cryptocurrency assets are considered intangible property, which Cryptopia holds as a trustee.

=== Cryptopia Rescue ===
In mid-2020, Christchurch businessman Victor Cattermole formed Cryptopia Rescue, a group intended to form a class action lawsuit against Grant Thornton for victims disgruntled by the liquidation process.

The Christchurch High Court mistakenly gave Cattermole a USB containing the details of over 900,000 Cryptopia account holders. Cattermole was ordered to return it but refused to comply. In July, Cattermole admitted to contempt of court, was fined NZ$7500 and agreed to pay costs of NZ$50,000. Cattermole was also accused of attempting to scam Cryptopia account holders; around forty victims later made complaints to liquidators that Cattermole had acquired their email addresses without their permission.

=== Employee theft incident ===
In July 2021, Michael Glaser, a former Cryptopia employee, pleaded guilty to stealing Bitcoin from old wallets in 2020, in an incident deemed unrelated to the 2019 hack. Glaser claimed to have raised security concerns with Cryptopia management during their employment between 2018 and 2019, and took unauthorised copies of private keys at that time and stored them on his home computer. Glaser was sentenced to home detention in 2022.
