= Kings Quest =

Comic book series

Publication information
- Publisher: Dynamite Entertainment
- Format: Limited series
- Genre: Superhero
- Publication date: May – September 2016
- No. of issues: 5
- Main character(s): Flash Gordon; Mandrake the Magician; The Phantom; Prince Valiant; Jungle Jim

Creative team
- Written by: Ben Acker and Heath Corson
- Artist: Dan McDaid

Collected editions
- Kings Quest: ISBN 1524102202

Kings Quest is a comic book limited series written by Ben Acker and Heath Corson and drawn by Dan McDaid. It is the sequel of the comic book series Kings Watch which featured a superhero team composed of characters from King Features Syndicate. Like its predecessor, the series was published by Dynamite Entertainment and its trade paperback collection released on January 10, 2017.

== Premise ==
Mandrake the Magician, Flash Gordon, and The Phantom once again teams up on a mission after the events of the first comic. This time, they are accompanied by new members Prince Valiant and Jungle Jim. The story begins during the aftermath of Ming the Merciless's invasion of Earth, with the heroes traveling the universe to rid it of Ming's influence. Lothar, Mandrake's ally, had become the new Phantom after the death of the recent incarnation, swearing to train the next rightful heir to the mantle.

== Reception ==
Ian Keogh of Slings and Arrows gave the series two stars, criticizing its lackluster storyline and poor imitation of 1940s sequential art. Joe Douglas from the Phantom Fan had a more positive review, stating, "While it may not do anything hugely original, Kings Quest is worth tracking down if you’re a fan of any of the classic characters involved or just enjoy a fun, lighthearted adventure."

== Sequel ==
The comic book series was followed by Flash Gordon: Kings Cross, which continues the story of the same team.
