= Jaime Vallvé =

Spanish comic strip artist

Jaime Vallvé (born in 1928 in Barcelona in Spain, died 15 October 2000) was a Spanish comic strip artist who lived and worked in Denmark during most of his lifetime. He started working with comics when he was in his teens and later studied art in France. Vallvé moved to Denmark in 1960 and, after having been involved in some other comics, made his debut in the Phantom during 1972. In the late 1970s and during the 1980s Vallvé became foremost an artist of Phantom stories set in the past. In 1996, Vallvé drew his 116th and last adventure.
