= Kings Watch =

Comic book series

Publication information
- Publisher: Dynamite Entertainment
- Schedule: Bi-monthly
- Format: Limited series
- Genre: Superhero
- Publication date: September 6, 2013 – April 7, 2014
- No. of issues: 5
- Main character(s): Dale Arden; Flash Gordon; Lothar; Mandrake the Magician; The Phantom; Professor Zarkov

Creative team
- Written by: Jeff Parker
- Artist(s): Marc Laming
- Letterer(s): Simon Bowland
- Colorist(s): Jordan Boyd

Collected editions
- Kings Watch: ISBN 1606904868

Kings Watch is a bi-monthly comic book limited series written by Jeff Parker and drawn by Marc Laming. It was published by Dynamite Entertainment from September 6, 2013 to April 7, 2014. It is a crossover featuring Flash Gordon, the Phantom, and Mandrake the Magician from King Features Syndicate. The trade paperback edition was released on August 13, 2014.

== Premise ==
When strange phenomena fill the skies and all humanity shares a similar vision, Flash Gordon, the Phantom, and Mandrake the Magician join forces to face a threat that is related to the Cult of the Cobra.

== Sequel ==
A sequel titled Kings Quest was released from May to September 2016.
