= Victoria Horne =

American actress (1911–2003)

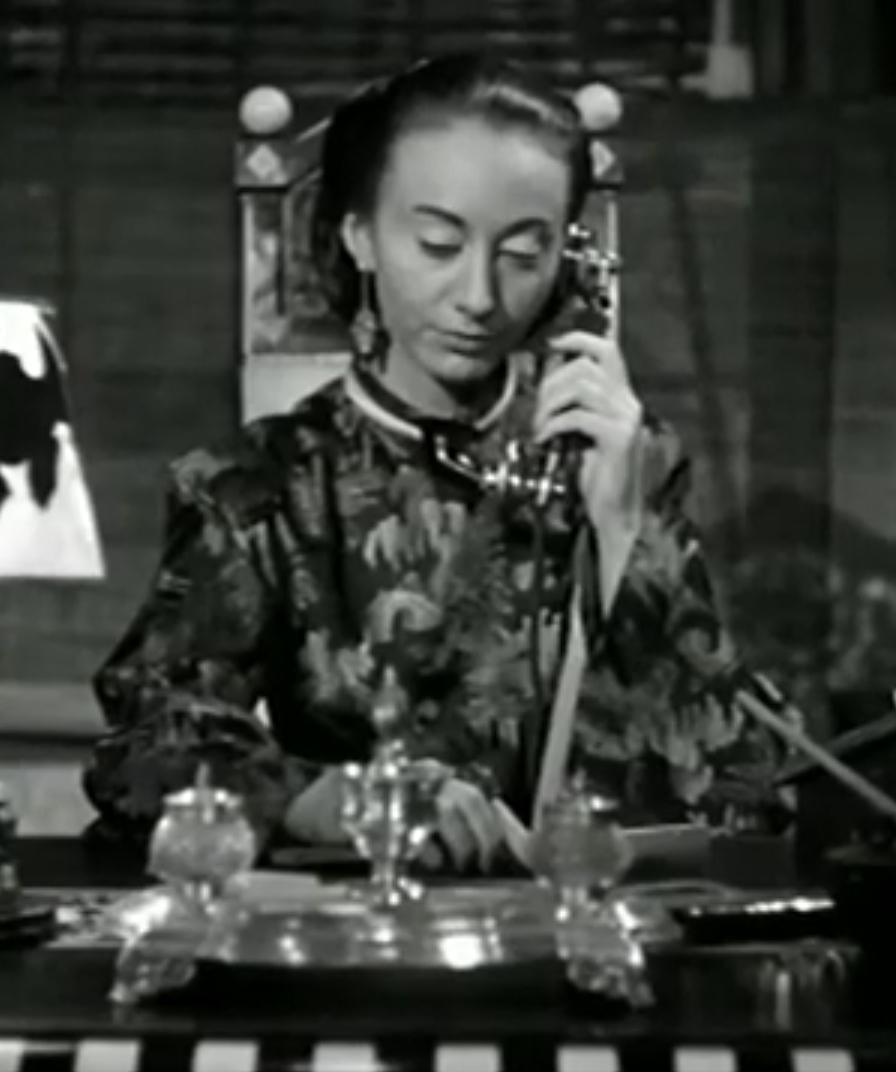
- Horne in Secret Agent X-9 (1945)
- Born: November 1, 1911; New York City, U.S.
- Died: October 10, 2003 (aged 91); Beverly Hills, California, U.S.
- Resting place: Forest Lawn Memorial Park, Glendale, California
- Other name: Victoria Horne Oakie
- Education: American Academy of Dramatic Arts
- Occupation: Actress
- Years active: 1944–1959
- Spouse: Jack Oakie (m. 1950; died 1978)

Victoria Horne (November 1, 1911 – October 10, 2003) was an American character actress, appearing in 49 films (uncredited in 25 of these) during the 1940s and 1950s.

== Early years ==
Horne was born on November 1, 1911, in New York City, to Ignatz Hornstein (who emigrated from Braila, Romania) and Mary Louise Schoenwetter Hornstein. She was the second of four children. The family name was changed to "Horne" when she was a child.

She was a graduate of the American Academy of Dramatic Arts.

== Career ==
The films in which she appeared included Blue Skies, The Ghost and Mrs. Muir, and Abbott and Costello Meet the Killer, Boris Karloff. Perhaps her best-known film roles were as James Stewart's love-searching niece Myrtle Mae Simmons in the 1950 film adaptation of Mary Chase's play Harvey, as Roberta in the 1952 Three Stooges short subject Cuckoo on a Choo Choo, and as Nabura, a villainous Japanese agent in the 1945 serial Secret Agent X-9.

== Personal life ==
She married actor Jack Oakie in 1950 and remained with him until his death on January 23, 1978. After his death, she arranged the posthumous publication of her late husband's book, Jack Oakie's Double Takes and also published a number of other books about him.

Victoria and Jack Oakie lived their entire married life at "Oakridge", their 11-acre (45,000 m^{2}) estate at 18650 Devonshire Street – 300 yards (270 m) west of Reseda Boulevard – in Northridge, Los Angeles, California. Oakridge, considered to be one of the last remnants of the large Northridge estates famed for thoroughbred breeding, was originally commissioned by Barbara Stanwyck and designed by Paul Williams; Stanwyck sold it to Oakie in 1940. Victoria Oakie continued to live there after her husband's death and bequeathed the estate to the University of Southern California. After two failed attempts to develop the property, Oakridge was acquired by the City of Los Angeles in 2010. The property was developed into the Oakridge Estate Park, which opened in December 2018. The house has been maintained in the park, as both it and the grounds are listed as Los Angeles Historic-Cultural Monument #484.

== Death ==
Horne died on October 10, 2003, in a retirement home in Beverly Hills, California. She was 91. She is interred in Forest Lawn Memorial Park in Glendale, California.

== Legacy ==
The Jack Oakie and Victoria Horne Oakie Charitable Foundation underwrites "lectures on comedy and scholarships for deserving film and theater students at some of the most prestigious institutions in the country." An official of Syracuse University said that money provided by the foundation "was a godsend" in helping the university establish its semester-in-Los-Angeles program.

== Filmography ==
| Year | Title | Role | Notes |
|---|---|---|---|
| 1944 | Phantom Lady | Miss Payton | Uncredited |
| 1944 | Men on Her Mind | Minor Role | Uncredited |
| 1944 | The Scarlet Claw | Nora | |
| 1944 | San Diego, I Love You | Mrs. Allsop | Uncredited |
| 1944 | Murder in the Blue Room | Second Maid | Uncredited |
| 1945 | Roughly Speaking | Maid at Millwood | Uncredited |
| 1945 | The Unseen | Lily | Uncredited |
| 1945 | Pillow to Post | Mildred Henry | Uncredited |
| 1945 | That's the Spirit | Patience | |
| 1945 | Secret Agent X-9 | Nabura | Serial |
| 1945 | Love, Honor and Goodbye | Miss Whipple | |
| 1945 | Pillow of Death | Vivian Fletcher | Voice, Uncredited |
| 1946 | The Scarlet Horseman | Loma | |
| 1946 | Cinderella Jones | Agnes | Uncredited |
| 1946 | To Each His Own | Nurse Daisy Gingras | |
| 1946 | In Old Sacramento | Ma Dodge | Uncredited |
| 1946 | She Wrote the Book | The Maid | Uncredited |
| 1946 | Blue Skies | Martha - Mary Elizabeth's Nanny | |
| 1947 | Suddenly, It's Spring | WAC Lt. Billings | |
| 1947 | The Guilt of Janet Ames | Nurse | Uncredited |
| 1947 | Smash-Up, the Story of a Woman | Woman | Uncredited |
| 1947 | The Ghost and Mrs. Muir | Eva Muir | |
| 1947 | The Crimson Key | Miss Phillips | |
| 1947 | Key Witness | Nurse Sibley | Uncredited |
| 1947 | Forever Amber | Quaker Woman | Uncredited |
| 1947 | Daisy Kenyon | Marsha - Dan's Secretary | Uncredited |
| 1948 | The Mating of Millie | Nurse | Uncredited |
| 1948 | The Gentleman from Nowhere | Miss Keams | Uncredited |
| 1948 | The Return of October | Margaret Grant | Uncredited |
| 1948 | The Snake Pit | Ward 33 Inmate | Uncredited |
| 1949 | The Life of Riley | Lucy Monahan | |
| 1949 | Streets of San Francisco | Witness | Uncredited |
| 1949 | Abbott and Costello Meet the Killer, Boris Karloff | Mrs. Hargreave | |
| 1949 | Mary Ryan, Detective | Wilma Hall | |
| 1950 | The Good Humor Man | Bride | |
| 1950 | Joe Palooka in Humphrey Takes a Chance | Miss Tucker | |
| 1950 | The Men | Paraplegic's Wife | Uncredited |
| 1950 | Never a Dull Moment | Shivaree Partyer | Uncredited |
| 1950 | Harvey | Myrtle Mae Simmons | |
| 1951 | The Company She Keeps | Marcia Guston | Uncredited |
| 1951 | Cuban Fireball | The Maid | |
| 1952 | Scandal Sheet | Mary | Uncredited |
| 1952 | Dreamboat | Waitress at Ruby's | Uncredited |
| 1952 | Cuckoo on a Choo Choo | Roberta | Short |
| 1953 | The Blue Gardenia | Disturbed Woman with Big Feet | Uncredited |
| 1953 | Affair with a Stranger | Mrs. Wallace | |
| 1959 | The Wonderful Country | Townswoman at Dance | Uncredited, (final film role) |

== Bibliography ==
- Jack Oakie (1980). Jack Oakie's Double Takes. Strawberry Hill Press. ISBN 0-89407-019-3. Autobiography published posthumously by Oakie's widow on January 1, 1980. 240 pages.
- Victoria Horne Oakie (1980). Jack Oakie's Oakridge. Strawberry Hill Press. ISBN 978-0-89407-102-7. A history of the Oakie family home, "Oakridge". 126 pages.
- Victoria Horne Oakie (1994). "Dear Jack": Hollywood birthday reminiscences to Jack Oakie. Strawberry Hill Press. ISBN 978-0-89407-113-3. Letters of congratulation and reminiscence sent from almost 150 celebrities to Jack Oakie in celebration of his 70th birthday. Compiled & edited by Mrs Oakie to commemorate his 90th birthday. 140 pages.
- Jack Oakie and Victoria Horne Oakie (1997). When the Line Is Straight: Jack Oakie's Comedy in Motion Pictures. Strawberry Hill Press. ISBN 978-0-89407-140-9.
- Victoria Horne Oakie (2001). Life With Jack Oakie: Anecdotes. Strawberry Hill Press. ISBN 0-7862-3417-2.
