= Tony DePaul =

American comics writer

Phantom daily strip from 2005. Art by Paul Ryan.

Tony DePaul is the current writer of the Lee Falk created adventure comic strip The Phantom. DePaul has been writing the newspaper strip since Falk died in 1999. As of mid-2018, the artists illustrating his stories are Mike Manley and Jeff Weigel. DePaul has also written Phantom stories for Scandinavian publisher Egmont since 1993, in their "Fantomen" (Phantom) comic books.

Previously a journalist for over twenty years, DePaul is now a freelance writer.
