= David McKay =

David McKay or MacKay may refer to:

== Arts ==
- Dave Mackay (musician) (1932–2020), American jazz pianist, singer and composer
- David Mackay (producer) (born 1944), Australian record producer/arranger and musical director
- David McKay (activist) (born 1986), activist and artist known for his betrayal by Brandon Darby and subsequent incarceration
- David McKay (actor), Scottish actor known for the television show Shoebox Zoo
- David McKay (publisher) (1860–1918), comic and book publisher
  - David McKay Publications

== Sports ==
- Dave Mackay (1934–2015), Scottish football player (Hearts, Tottenham, Derby, Scotland) and manager
- Dave Mackay (footballer, born 1981), Scottish football player (Dundee, St Johnstone) and manager
- David Mackay (sailor) (born 1959), New Zealand Olympic sailor
- Dave MacKay (ice hockey) (1919–1980), Canadian professional ice hockey player
- Dave McKay (baseball) (David Lawrence McKay, born 1950), Canadian major league baseball player
- Dave McKay (footballer) (born 1984), Scottish footballer playing for Clyde F.C.
- David Mackay (footballer) (born 1988), Australian rules footballer for Adelaide Crows
- David McKay (baseball) (born 1995), American baseball pitcher for the Oakland Athletics
- David McKay (Australian footballer) (born 1949), Australian rules footballer for Carlton Football Club
- David McKay (footballer, born 1998), Scottish footballer
- David McKay (journalist) (1921–2004), Australian motoring journalist and racing driver
- David McKay (wrestler) (born 1960), Canadian Olympic wrestler

== Others ==
- David McKay (politician) (1844–1917), Utah state senator
- David J. C. MacKay (1967–2016), British academic researcher in information theory and environmentalism, inventor, government advisor and educator
- David Lawrence McKay (1901–1993), leader in the Sunday School of The Church of Jesus Christ of Latter-day Saints
- David Mackay (pilot) (born 1957), Scottish chief pilot of Virgin Galactic
- David MacKay (VC) (1831–1880), Scottish soldier and winner of the Victoria Cross
- David O. McKay (1873–1970), ninth president of The Church of Jesus Christ of Latter-day Saints
- David S. McKay (1936–2013), chief scientist for astrobiology at the Johnson Space Center
- David Mackay (architect) (1933–2014), British architect
- David I. McKay (born 1963), president and CEO of the Royal Bank of Canada
- A. D. David Mackay, CEO and president of Kellogg Company
- David Neil McKay (1929–2010), American librarian and government administrator

== See also ==
- Dave Mackey (born 1969), American ultra runner and adventure racer
