= Brick Bradford =

American comic strip

- Clarence Gray's Brick Bradford (June 21, 1942)
- Author(s): William Ritt (1933–1948); Clarence Gray (1948–1956); Paul Norris (1956–1987)
- Illustrator(s): Clarence Gray (1933–1956); Paul Norris (1952–1987)
- Current status/schedule: Concluded daily & Sunday strip
- Launch date: August 21, 1933
- End date: April 25, 1987
- Syndicate: Central Press Association / King Features Syndicate
- Publisher: David McKay Publications
- Genre: science fiction adventure

Brick Bradford is a science fiction comic strip created by writer William Ritt, a journalist based in Cleveland, Ohio, and artist Clarence Gray. It was first distributed on August 21, 1933 by Central Press Association, a subsidiary of King Features Syndicate which specialized in producing material for small-town newspapers. The strip ended in 1987.

Brick Bradford achieved its greatest popularity outside the United States. The series was carried by both newspapers and comic books in Australia and New Zealand. In France the strip was known as Luc Bradefer ("Luke Ironarm") and was published in many newspapers. The strip was also widely published in Italy where it was known variously as Giorgio Ventura and Marco Spada and in Greece in the newspaper Ethnos (as Princess Palona) during the 1960s. In Sweden it was known as "Tom Trick". In Yugoslavia the strip was published in a dozen different magazines since 1935.

== Publication history ==
Ritt grew tired of Brick Bradford in the mid-1940s, and by 1948 he had turned over first the daily and then the Sunday to Gray, who produced the strip alone until his health problems increased. In 1952, Paul Norris, who had been working on King's Jungle Jim, took over the daily. When Gray died in 1956, Norris took over the Sunday strip. Norris retired in 1987, and the strip was retired as well, with the daily ending April 25, 1987, and the Sunday strips two weeks later.

== Characters and story ==
Brick Bradford was an athletic and adventurous redheaded (later blond) aviator from Kentucky who continually encountered fantastic situations. Initially, the strip was focused on Earth-bound, aviation-focused adventures, in a similar manner to Lester J. Maitland and Dick Calkins' Skyroads. However, as the strip developed, Brick Bradford increasingly featured fantastic elements in the manner of Buck Rogers and Flash Gordon. Ritt was an admirer of science fiction writers H. G. Wells, Edgar Rice Burroughs and Abraham Merritt, and drew on some of their ideas when writing Brick Bradford. Brick Bradford then became more of a space opera/adventure story, with its tales of dinosaurs, lost civilizations, intergalactic villains, robots and subatomic worlds.

By 1935, Brick Bradford's popularity had greatly increased, and it arrived in the Sunday comics sections of major newspapers in 1933, followed by a weekend edition that began November 24, 1934. In the daily strips Brick kept company with his friend Sandy Sanderson, balding and bearded scientist Kalla Kopak, and June Salisbury, Brick's girlfriend and daughter of his ally Professor Van Atta Salisbury. The Sunday strips featured completely different characters and plots. Here Brick was often accompanied on his adventures by Professor Horatio Southern and his daughter April, who was Brick's love interest . Later characters included Brick's pugnacious sidekick Bucko O'Brien and the beautiful, black-haired bad girl Saturn Sadie who reformed and in the end married the stalwart hero.

Brick's enemies included Dr. Franz Ego, a spy; Avil Blue, inventor of a giant robot; and the "Assassins", descendants of the Middle Eastern sect of the same name.

On April 20, 1935, the strip added a large top-shaped time machine invented by Professor Southern called, fittingly, the Time Top which could travel to both past and future and off into the depths of space, presaging Doc Wonmug's device in Alley Oop four years later and the TARDIS on Doctor Who by almost three decades.

== Daily strips by Clarence Gray and William Ritt ==
- D001 In the City Beneath the Sea (08/21/1933 – 06/30/1934) 270 strips
- D002 With Brocco the Buccaneer (07/02/1934 – 05/18/1935) 276 strips
- D003 On the Isles Beyond the Ice (05/20/1935 – 04/11/1936) 282 strips
- D004 Brick Bradford and the Lord of Doom (04/13/1936 – 02/06/1937) 258 strips
- D005 Adrift in an Atom [aka Voyage in a Coin] (02/08/1937 – 01/08/1938) 288 strips
- D006 In the Fortress of Fear (01/10/1938 – 02/11/1939) 342 strips
- D007 Brick Bradford and the Metal Monster (02/13/1939 – 03/16/1940) 342 strips
- D008 Brick Bradford Seeks the Diamond Doll (03/18/1940 – 12/28/1940) 246 strips
- D009 On the Throne of Titania (12/30/1940 – 06/12/1943) 768 strips
- D010 Beyond the Crystal Door (06/14/1943 – 10/21/1944) 462 strips
- D011 The Queen of the Night (10/28/1944 – 06/01/1946) 468 strips
- D012 The Witch Doctor of Wanchi (06/03/1946 – 12/07/1946) 162 strips
- D013 The Strange Case of Captain Boldd (12/09/1946 – 07/19/1947) 192 strips
- D014 Lost Train In Tunnel #10 (07/21/1947 – 05/01/1948) 246 strips
- D015 The Prophet of Thorn (05/03/1948 – 03/19/1949) 276 strips
- D016 The Colossal Fossil (03/21/1949 – 07/02/1949) 90 strips
- D017 The Island of the Eye (07/04/1949 – 12/24/1949) 150 strips
- D018 Smokeballs (12/26/1949 – 03/25/1950) 60 strips
- D019 The Howling Face (03/27/1950 – 06/17/1950) 90 strips
- D020 The Legacy of Low Lake (06/19/1950 – 10/07/1950) 96 strips
- D021 Detour of Doubt (10/09/1950 – 12/30/1950) 60 strips
- D022 Frame-Up (01/01/1951 – 03/31/1951) 90 strips
- D023 Mesa Macabre (04/02/1951 – 08/11/1951) 114 strips
- D024 Moon Maiden (08/13/1951 – 10/06/1951) 48 strips
- D025 Shadow in the Sky (10/08/1951 – 02/16/1952) 102 strips
- D026 The Six Seeds of Sibed (02/18/1952 – 05/10/1952) 96 strips
- D027 Mr. Distance (05/12/1952 – 10/18/1952) 138 strips

== Daily strips by Paul Norris ==
Paul Norris' Brick Bradford strip of January 27, 1955

- D028 Condor Corridor (10/20/1952 – 04/04/1953) 144 strips
- D029 Operation Back Burner (04/06/1953 – 07/04/1953) 78 strips
- D030 Oroto Otoro (07/06/1953 – 10/24/1953) 96 strips
- D031 Poet and Present (10/26/1953 – 01/02/1954) 60 strips
- D032 Deadline Dilemma (01/04/1954 – 05/01/1954) 102 strips
- D033 Frogman's Folly (05/03/1954 – 07/24/1954) 72 strips
- D034 Poet's Revenge (07/26/1954 – 10/09/1954) 66 strips
- D035 Honey’n’Holly (10/11/1954 – 12/04/1954) 48 strips
- D036 Temperamental Tessie (12/06/1954 – 01/29/1955) 48 strips
- D037 Found and Profound (01/31/1955 – 04/30/1955) 78 strips
- D038 Bauble's Belle (05/02/1955 – 06/25/1955) 48 strips
- D039 Silent Partners! (06/27/1955 – 10/08/1955) 90 strips
- D040 The Case of the Vicious Vines (10/10/1955 – 12/31/1955) 72 strips
- D041 Stowaway (01/02/1956 – 05/12/1956) 114 strips
- D042 Something Borrowed, Something Blue (05/14/1956 – 08/04/1956) 72 strips
- D043 Astral Assignment (08/06/1956 – 10/20/1956) 66 strips
- D044 Return of Paul Bunyan (10/22/1956 – 01/26/1957) 84 strips
- D045 The Search For Kris Kreg (01/28/1957 – 04/20/1957) 72 strips
- D046 Time-Top Trials! (04/22/1957 – 09/14/1957) 126 strips
- D047 Eye of the Needle (09/16/1957 – 11/16/1957) 54 strips
- D048 Return to Pura (11/18/1957 – 02/22/1958) 84 strips
- D049 Deep Danger (02/24/1958 – 06/07/1958) 90 strips
- D050 X-S-S-16 (06/09/1958 – 09/13/1958) 84 strips
- D051 The Search for Doctor Eastland (09/15/1958 – 01/24/1959) 114 strips
- D052 Man on the Moon (01/26/1959 – 06/06/1959) 114 strips
- D053 The Sound (06/08/1959 – 09/19/1959) 90 strips
- D054 Mission to Maga (09/21/1959 – 01/23/1960) 108 strips
- D055 Steppingstone (01/25/1960 – 09/24/1960) 210 strips
- D056 Tattletale Tiros (09/26/1960 – 03/04/1961) 138 strips
- D057 Silent Search (03/06/1961 – 10/07/1961) 186 strips
- D058 Bradford's Bondage (10/09/1961 – 11/25/1961) 42 strips
- D059 Botanical Warfare (11/27/1961 – 04/28/1962) 132 strips
- D060 Adventure in the Aqua-Mole (04/30/1962 – 09/15/1962) 120 strips
- D061 The Proxima Centauri Run (09/17/1962 – 02/16/1963) 132 strips
- D062 Lady Loot (02/18/1963 – 05/18/1963) 78 strips
- D063 Adventure in Andromeda (05/20/1963 – 10/19/1963) 132 strips
- D064 Operation Chaos (10/21/1963 – 12/28/1963) 60 strips
- D065 Return to Panola (12/30/1963 – 05/16/1964) 120 strips
- D066 Cold Caper (05/18/1964 – 10/24/1964) 138 strips
- D067 Journey to Procyon (10/26/1964 – 01/23/1965) 78 strips
- D068 Saturn Sadie's Side Trip (01/25/1965 – 07/03/1965) 138 strips
- D069 Silverslinger (07/05/1965 – 10/23/1965) 96 strips
- D070 The Treasure of Toolee Tooee (10/25/1965 – 04/30/1966) 162 strips
- D071 The Agrarians (05/02/1966 – 08/27/1966) 102 strips
- D072 Strange Sargasso (08/29/1966 – 03/25/1967) 180 strips
- D073 Search for a Samaritan (03/27/1967 – 08/12/1967) 120 strips
- D074 Destination Laza (08/14/1967 – 09/23/1967) 36 strips
- D075 The Radiant Ruins of Ramdan (09/25/1967 – 05/04/1968) 192 strips
- D076 Ardun's Ark (05/06/1968 – 07/06/1968) 54 strips
- D077 Flight of Fantasy (07/08/1968 – 09/28/1968) 72 strips
- D078 Solitary Journey (09/30/1968 – 12/07/1968) 60 strips
- D079 Gathering on Gwaymus (12/09/1968 – 03/01/1969) 72 strips
- D080 The Evil Enkar (03/03/1969 – 05/03/1969) 54 strips
- D081 Galileo's Ghost (05/05/1969 – 07/26/1969) 72 strips
- D082 Revenge (07/28/1969 – 10/04/1969) 60 strips
- D083 Tabby's Tantrums (10/06/1969 – 12/13/1969) 60 strips
- D084 Return to Gwaymus (12/15/1969 – 03/14/1970) 78 strips
- D085 The Treasure of Tarabagara (03/16/1970 – 05/23/1970) 60 strips
- D086 Purple Pintar (05/25/1970 – 08/29/1970) 84 strips
- D087 Search for Urubu (08/31/1970 – 10/31/1970) 54 strips
- D088 Time and Trouble (11/02/1970 – 01/30/1971) 78 strips
- D089 Tenacious Tempo (02/01/1971 – 04/03/1971) 54 strips
- D090 Hoppy's Re-Migration (04/05/1971 – 06/12/1971) 60 strips
- D091 Tardy Tempo (06/14/1971 – 09/04/1971) 72 strips
- D092 Double Trouble (09/06/1971 – 11/13/1971) 60 strips
- D093 Stranded (11/15/1971 – 01/08/1972) 48 strips
- D094 Phoenix Fever (01/10/1972 – 04/08/1972) 78 strips
- D095 Going Home (04/10/1972 – 07/08/1972) 78 strips
- D096 Then There Were Two (07/10/1972 – 09/23/1972) 66 strips
- D097 Trail of the Tonabera (09/25/1972 – 12/02/1972) 60 strips
- D098 Polar Poltergeist (12/04/1972 – 03/03/1973) 78 strips
- D099 Long Way Home (03/05/1973 – 06/23/1973) 96 strips
- D100 A Change of Plans (06/25/1973 – 10/20/1973) 102 strips
- D101 A Flight of Ghosts (10/22/1973 – 12/08/1973) 42 strips
- D102 Old Masters (12/10/1973 – 02/16/1974) 60 strips
- D103 Cygnus Two (02/18/1974 – 04/27/1974) 60 strips
- D104 Lore (04/29/1974 – 08/03/1974) 84 strips
- D105 Search for Succor (08/05/1974 – 10/05/1974) 54 strips
- D106 Rescue (10/07/1974 – 12/28/1974) 72 strips
- D107 Stronger Force (12/30/1974 – 02/22/1975) 48 strips
- D108 Holiday on Hokuku! (02/24/1975 – 05/31/1975) 84 strips
- D109 Sea of Secrets (06/02/1975 – 08/16/1975) 66 strips
- D110 The Folly of Petro Leur (08/18/1975 – 12/27/1975) 114 strips
- D111 Lore Revisited (12/29/1975 – 02/14/1976) 42 strips
- D112 Beyond Bucala (02/16/1976 – 05/29/1976) 90 strips
- D113 The Way Home (05/31/1976 – 10/09/1976) 114 strips
- D114 Eye Spy (10/11/1976 – 01/29/1977) 96 strips
- D115 Rescue (01/31/1977 – 04/23/1977) 72 strips
- D116 Dead End (04/25/1977 – 08/27/1977) 108 strips
- D117 Lost (08/29/1977 – 01/07/1978) 114 strips
- D118 Dolphins of Dahgara (01/09/1978 – 04/22/1978) 90 strips
- D119 Wild Wet World (04/24/1978 – 08/05/1978) 90 strips
- D120 Space Trace (08/07/1978 – 12/16/1978) 114 strips
- D121 Emigres’ Reversion (12/18/1978 – 04/07/1979) 96 strips
- D122 Web of Life (04/09/1979 – 09/22/1979) 144 strips
- D123 Two, Too Many (09/24/1979 – 01/19/1980) 102 strips
- D124 Runagate (01/21/1980 – 06/07/1980) 120 strips
- D125 Loose Ends (06/09/1980 – 10/25/1980) 120 strips
- D126 Iona Incursion (10/27/1980 – 01/17/1981) 72 strips
- D127 Solar Power Play (01/19/1981 – 04/18/1981) 78 strips
- D128 Time Trials (04/20/1981 – 07/25/1981) 84 strips
- D129 The Realm of Ram (07/27/1981 – 01/02/1982) 138 strips
- D130 Jeopardy (01/04/1982 – 04/17/1982) 90 strips
- D131 Search for Saturn Sadie (04/19/1982 – 09/18/1982) 132 strips
- D132 Prekarius Plot (09/20/1982 – 04/16/1983) 180 strips
- D133 Topaz (04/18/1983 – 09/17/1983) 132 strips
- D134 Beyond the Limits (09/19/1983 – 12/31/1983) 90 strips
- D135 The Penny Black (01/02/1984 – 05/19/1984) 120 strips
- D136 Burawa Bondage (05/21/1984 – 08/03/1985) 378 strips
- D137 Aggression at Agwon (08/05/1985 – 12/21/1985) 120 strips
- D138 The Save of Saturn Sadie (12/23/1985 – 04/26/1986) 108 strips
- D139 What Next? (04/28/1986 – 07/26/1986) 78 strips
- D140 Mind Over Matter (07/28/1986 – 12/20/1986) 126 strips
- D141 Flight Tests (12/22/1986 – 04/25/1987) 108 strips

== Sunday strips by Clarence Gray and William Ritt ==
- S001 The Land Of The Lost (11/25/1934 – 08/11/1935) 38 strips
- S002 In The Middle Of The Earth (08/18/1935 – 12/29/1935) 20 strips
- S003 Nameless Empire (In The Middle Of The Earth) (01/05/1936 – 08/09/1936) 32 strips
- S004 Forest Of Terror (In The Middle Of The Earth) (08/16/1936 – 10/11/1936) 9 strips
- S005 The Mayan Empire (In The Middle Of The Earth) (10/18/1936 – 01/31/1937) 16 strips
- S006 Land Of The Swan (In The Middle Of The Earth) (02/07/1937 – 10/10/1937) 36 strips
- S007 The Time Top (10/17/1937 – 12/05/1937) 8 strips
- S008 Travel Through Time (Traveller In Time) (12/12/1937 – 07/10/1938) 31 strips
- S009 Pirates Of The 17th Century (World Of 1685) (07/17/1938 – 02/05/1939) 30 strips
- S010 The Mummy (02/12/1939 – 11/12/1939) 40 strips
- S011 The Crown Of The Desert's Kings (11/19/1939 – 10/06/1940) 47 strips
- S012 On The Seas Of China (In China Seas) (10/13/1940 – 03/23/1941) 24 strips
- S013 The Southern Treasure (Martin Bloodstone) (03/30/1941 – 09/28/1941) 27 strips
- S014 Lost People (The Lost World) (10/05/1941 – 12/28/1941) 13 strips
- S015 Cities Of Future (Futura) (01/04/1942 – 10/11/1942) 41 strips
- S016 The Men Of The North (The Ice King) (10/18/1942 – 04/25/1943) 28 strips
- S017 Ultrasphere (05/02/1943 – 11/21/1943) 30 strips
- S018 The Thief Of Light (11/28/1943 – 08/27/1944) 40 strips
- S019 The Ageless Voice (09/03/1944 – 09/16/1945) 55 strips
- S020 The Third Millenium (Millennium Three) (09/23/1945 – 10/06/1946) 55 strips
- S021 Cities In The Precipice (The Cone Dwellers) (10/13/1946 – 01/05/1947) 13 strips
- S022 The Lord Of Doom (01/12/1947 – 08/10/1947) 31 strips
- S023 Birth Of a Legend (08/17/1947 – 10/26/1947) 11 strips
- S024 The Aztec Migration (The Aztec Ancestors) (11/02/1947 – 01/25/1948) 13 strips
- S025 Among The Incas (02/01/1948 – 09/19/1948) 34 strips
- S026 The Land Of The Unicorn (09/26/1948 – 10/23/1949) 57 strips
- S027 The Healing Ray (10/30/1949 – 01/01/1950) 10 strips
- S028 The Way Of Stars (In Quest Of Crystal Q) (01/08/1950 – 08/20/1950) 33 strips
- S029 Shada, Prince Of The Black Planet (08/27/1950 – 03/18/1951) 30 strips
- S030 The Metropolis In Space (Planet Platter) (03/25/1951 – 11/04/1951) 33 strips
- S031 The Wonderful Meteor (11/11/1951 – 06/08/1952) 31 strips
- S032 Coral Labyrinth (06/15/1952 – 02/01/1953) 34 strips
- S033 Sargasso of Space (02/08/1953 – 11/15/1953) 41 strips
- S034 Trespassing in Space (11/22/1953 – 07/11/1954) 34 strips
- S035 The Blue Interlude (New-Look Interlude) (07/18/1954 – 10/03/1954) 12 strips
- S035A Ominous Ods at Ostar (10/10/1954 - 05/29/1955) 24 strips
- S036 Stay In Relaxa (Sojourn At Relaxa) (06/05/1955 – 02/19/1956) 38 strips
- S037 Recalled – Earth (Recall) (02/26/1956 – 05/13/1956) 12 strips
- S038 World Of The Future (Quest Of Quentin Quado) (05/20/1956 – 04/21/1957) 50 strips

== Sunday Strips by Paul Norris ==
- S039 The Return Of Brick Bradford (04/28/1957 – 11/10/1957) 28 strips
- S040 Travel In Space (11/17/1957 – 04/27/1958) 24 strips
- S041 Beyond The Stars (05/04/1958 – 10/12/1958) 24 strips
- S042 Iperspazio! (10/19/1958 – 03/29/1959) 24 strips
- S043 Forced Landing (04/05/1959 – 09/13/1959) 24 strips
- S044 Meteor Rain (09/20/1959 – 02/28/1960) 24 strips
- S045 A Castle Of Papers (03/06/1960 – 05/01/1960) 9 strips
- S046 The Indians Of The Space (05/08/1960 – 07/31/1960) 13 strips
- S047 The Father Of Saturn Sadie (08/07/1960 – 09/25/1960) 8 strips
- S048 One Undeclared Submarine War (10/02/1960 – 01/01/1961 14 strips
- S049 Saboteurs Of The Missile Bases (01/08/1961 –04/02/1961)
- S050 The Search for Willa Ware (04/09/1961 to 06/18/1961)

=== S051 to S101 with date in European format. ===
- S051 The Big Red (25.06.1961 - 29.10.1961)
- S052 Mission on Magna (05.11.1961 - 20.05.1962)
- S053 Derelict Spaceship (27.05.1962 - 02.09.1962)
- S054 The Venus Viking (09.09.1962 - 30.12.1962)
- S055 Rescue Mission (06.01.1963 - 02.06.1963)
- S056 untitled 09.06.1963 - 03.11.1963
- S057 untitled 10.11.1963 - 26.01.1964
- S058 untitled 02.02.1964 - 09.08.1964
- S059 untitled 16.08.1964 - 25.10.1964
- S060 untitled 01.11.1964 - 17.01.1965
- S061 untitled 24.01.1965 - 28.03.1965
- S062 The Big Hunt 04.04.1965 - 25.07.1965
- S063 untitled 01.08.1965 - 28.11.1965
- S064 untitled 05.12.1965 - 06.02.1966
- S065 untitled 13.02.1965 - 24.07.1966
- S066 untitled 31.07.1966 - 26.03.1967
- S067 untitled 02.04.1967 - 03.09.1967
- S068 untitled 10.09.1967 - 31.12.1967
- S069 untitled 07.01.1968 - 30.06.1968
- S070 untitled 07.07.1968 - 13.04.1969
- S071 untitled 20.04.1969 - 20.07.1969
- S072 untitled 27.07.1969 - 18.01.1970
- S073 untitled 25.01.1970 - 14.06.1970
- S074 untitled 21.06.1970 - 30.08.1970
- S075 untitled 06.09.1970 - 28.02.1971
- S076 untitled 07.03.1971 - 16.05.1971
- S077 untitled 23.05.1971 - 25.07.1971
- S078 The RHO IV 01.08.1971 - 03.10.1971
- S079 The Strait of Sibod 10.10.1971 - 26.12.1971
- S079A Gwatara 02.01.1972 - 12.03.1972
- S080 Silent Satellites 19.03.1972 - 11.06.1972
- S081 Mission to Makahabe 18.06.1972 - 01.10.1972
- S082 A New Order of Makahabe 08.10.1972 - 14.01.1973
- S083 Stranded 21.01.1973 - 29.04.1973
- S084 Another World 06.05.1973 - 23.09.1973
- S085 Journey to Jurisik 30.09.1973 - 09.12.1973
- S086 Haloes 16.12.1973 - 05.05.1974
- S087 untitled 12.05.1974 - 14.07.1974
- S088 Earth Bound 21.07.1974 - 08.12.1974
- S089 Lost 15.12.1974 - 27.04.1975
- S090 Strings Attached 04.05.1975 - 21.12.1975
- S091 untitled 28.12.1975 - 04.07.1976
- S092 untitled 11.07.1976 - 21.11.1976
- S093 The Treasure of Tropoleetz 28.11.1976 - 03.04.1977
- S094 The Botanist 10.04.1977 - 03.07.1977
- S095 untitled 10.07.1977 - 02.10.1977
- S096 Power 09.10.1977 - 15.01.1978
- S097 Retaliation 22.01.1978 - 07.05.1978
- S098 Night Raiders 14.05.1978 - 12.11.1978
- S099 Astral Armageddon 19.11.1978 - 18.02.1979
- S100 Phool's Folly 25.02.1978 - 20.05.1979
- S101 Trial of Tempo III 27.05.1979 - ??.??.1979

== Reprints ==
Brick Bradford was reprinted in comic-book form as King Features began to expand into that genre, including King Comics (published by David McKay Publications), starting from April 1936 (along with Barney Google, Henry, Popeye and Bringing Up Father among others), as well as in Ace Comics from 1947 to 1949. As the old comics were reprinted, a new series starring Brick was published by Standard Comics, but the series was soon canceled after 4 issues.

Brick Bradford reappeared by 1966 in original comics published by King Comics. Brick Bradford stories appeared as back-up strips in The Phantom #26, 28 and Mandrake the Magician #5–7, 9, 10.

In the 1970s, the Pacific Comics Club reprinted several Brick Bradford stories in book form. Numerous Brick Bradford stories were reprinted in Italian and French booklets.

== Collections of comic strip stories ==
- Brick Bradford in the Fortress of Fear: Daily Strips Jan. 8, 1938– Feb. 11, 1939. Club Anni Trenta, Genova, 1971, (English-language reprints).
- Brick Bradford : Voyage In A Coin by William Ritt and Clarence Gray. New York, NY : Comics Stars in the World & Pacific Comics Club, 1976.
- Brick Bradford in the City Beneath the Sea by Ritt and Gray. Papeete-Tahiti (Polynesia), Pacific Comics Club, 1976.
- Brick Bradford in The Middle of the Earth by Ritt and Gray. Papeete-Tahiti (Polynesia), Pacific Comics Club, (J. Taoc), 1976.
- Brick Bradford with Brocco the Buccaneer by Ritt and Gray. Papeete-Tahiti (Polynesia), Pacific Comics Club, 1976.
- Brick Bradford in The Land Of The Lost by Ritt & Gray. Papeete-Tahiti (Polynesia) Pacific Comics Club, 1981.
- Brick Bradford and the Combustion Furnace: Daily Strips 2/8/1937-1/8/1938 by Ritt and Gray. Toronto, Dragon Lady Press, Issue 5, 1987.
- Brick Bradford: Flight Tests by Paul Norris, in the Strip Adventure Special anthology, Forest Hills, N.Y. : JAL Publications, 1992.

== In other media ==
The strip also had a book series produced by Whitman Publishing's Big Little Books.

Brick Bradford, a 15-chapter serial film starring Kane Richmond, was produced by Columbia Pictures in 1947.

Brick Bradford was referenced in the 1965 The Dick Van Dyke Show episode "Uhny Uftz" when Rob believe he has seen a flying saucer with the "Brick Bradford insignia" on it, which he describes as being like a lightning bolt (in the actual comic strip Brick's insignia was a "B" in a circle).

== Time Top sculpture ==
Before his death from cancer, Canadian artist Jerry Pethick (1935–2003) conceived a large bronze sculpture in the shape of the Time Top as depicted in later installments of Brick Bradford. In 2004, his widow, Margaret Pethick, took over the project. It was submerged in sea water for two years while connected to an electrical source to accelerate barnacle and mineral accretion on its surface for an aged look. In August 2006, the sculpture was installed on its permanent site at False Creek, Vancouver, British Columbia.

== Sources ==
- Strickler, Dave. Syndicated Comic Strips and Artists, 1924–1995: The Complete Index. Cambria, CA: Comics Access, 1995. ISBN 0-9700077-0-1.
