= Jimmy Thompson (comics artist) =

American comic book artist

- Born: George Orlando Thompson; October 3, 1907 Toronto, Ontario, Canada
- Died: September 16, 1949 (aged 41) Billings, Montana, U.S.
- Notable works: Robotman, Captain Compass
- Spouse: Harriet Keen Moore (m. 1942; died 1949)

George "Jimmy" Orlando Thompson (October 3, 1907 – September 16, 1949) was a Canadian comic book artist during the Golden Age of Comic Books. He worked for many companies throughout his career including DC Comics, Timely Comics, Marvel Comics, Fawcett Comics, David McKay Publications, and King Features Syndicate.

== Early life ==
Thompson was born on October 3, 1907, in Toronto, Ontario, Canada. His parents were George Thompson and Mabel Thompson (née Martin), and he had one younger sister, Dorothy Thompson (born 1912). As a young man, Jimmy worked in his father's photography shop.

In 1923, Jimmy went to work in the photography lab of a Toronto newspaper. In 1925, Jimmy began his art career, drawing single-panel cartoons for Canadian newspapers, generally about sports. In 1928, a feature in the Niagara Falls Gazette describes Thompson as a "well known Canadian artist", and describes him as having insured his drawing arm for $25,000.

== Professional career ==
Thompson's first work in the US was in 1930, a sports strip for the Buffalo Courier-Express. At this time he was apparently famous enough as an artist in Canada to be featured in product advertisements, notably for Buckingham Cigarettes. In 1937, he immigrated to the United States. Around this time he started drawing the War on Crime strip for Ledger Syndicate.

In the 1930s, Thompson was a commercial draftsman, and an uncredited ghost-artist on US newspaper strips such as Roy Powers, Eagle Scout and Hairsbreadth Harry.

His first published comic book stories appeared in King Features Syndicate's King Comics, as well as in contemporaneous book Magic Comics. These books were largely reprints of existing material, though Thompson drew new strips for them. These were primarily western comics, though (unusually for the time), generally oriented toward the perspective of the Native American characters. His "Red Men" was described by historian Ron Goulart as one of "the best Indian stories in comic book history. It portrayed conflicts among tribes and mixed in Indian magic and folk tales. His protagonist, a Mohawk named Black Hawk, was a man of skill and intelligence." Other critics have described Thompson's western stories as "sympathetic and respectful".

His 76-page story "Red Eagle" in David McKay Publications' Feature Book #16 (1938), can be considered among the earliest works in the graphic novel format. It is sometimes claimed to be "the first" (though this title is contentious).

On May 15, 1942, Thompson married Harriet Keen Moore.

Thompson drew mostly western comics until 1943, when he switched to the super hero genre, and started working with DC Comics on "Robotman", "The Human Torch" and "The Angel" for Timely Comics. He also did work for Fawcett Comics on "Mary Marvel" and "Captain Midnight". Since he was too old to be drafted during World War II, he was in demand as a replacement for high-profile artists who had been drafted, such as Jerry Siegel, Will Eisner, and Jack Cole.

== Death ==
Thompson left Timely Comics after Human Torch #28 (Fall 1947). He fell ill after this, and briefly moved in with friends among the Crow Nation, but had to move into intensive care in a hospital in Billings, Montana after this.

Thompson died on September 16, 1949, in Deaconess Hospital. He is buried in Billings, Montana.

Thompson's works continued to appear for several years after his death. His last work in National Comics Publications appeared in 1950. A few further books were published over the next couple years, some westerns for Avon Comics, and the titles Heroic and Juke Box Comics for Eastern Color Printing. Jimmy Thompson's last published works appeared in 1952.

== Legacy ==
Thompson is generally well regarded as an artist, and was an all-in-one talent, doing the penciling, inking, and lettering on the majority of his stories.

However, he is relatively obscure to modern audiences, especially when compared to contemporaries like Will Eisner or Jack Cole. Peer artists like Jim Steranko believed Thompson could at times be considered superior to Eisner or Cole.

Thompson's obscurity is generally attributed to none of Thompson's inventions, like Captain Compass, having ever taken off as hit characters. Also, he died fairly young in the 1940s, which limited the reach of his career.
