= David McKay (publisher) =

Scottish-American publisher (1860–1918)

David McKay (June 24, 1860 – November 20, 1918) was a Scottish American publisher, head of David McKay Publications, which published books of all kinds, including early examples of comic books.

== Biography ==
=== Early life ===
McKay was born in Dysart, Scotland, on June 24, 1860. At the age of 11, he came to the United States with his parents. At the age of 13, he began working for J. B. Lippincott & Co., learning the bookselling trade.

=== Rees Welsh ===
By the age of 21, McKay was placed in charge of the miscellaneous catalog of books by publisher Rees Welsh. One year later, upon hearing McKay had been offered a position with a rival publisher, Welsh asked McKay to take the helm, offering to sell the entire publishing firm to him. McKay’s notoriety as a publisher actually began while still working for Rees Welsh & Co., by bringing out Walt Whitman’s Leaves of Grass when another publisher, James R. Osgood & Co., had thrown it out because of threatened legal action by the attorney-general of Massachusetts for its “alleged immorality.”

=== David McKay Publications ===
In September 1882, with $500 of his own money and $2,500 in borrowed money and notes, McKay began his own publishing company on South 9th Street in Philadelphia.

At age 25, McKay published the first collected set of Shakespeare's works in the United States. By December 1905, McKay had absorbed many rival publishing houses into his own, and was publishing books in almost every popular genre of the time, including world famous literature, textbooks and a number of children’s books.

The company also published Ace Comics, Blondie Comics, Dick Tracy, Mandrake the Magician (1938), and several other titles.

== Personal life ==
McKay's family included a wife, one daughter and four sons. His son Alexander would follow in his father’s shoes by taking over the house to go on to publish Walt Disney's first Mickey Mouse comics, the Blondie and Dagwood comic series, and numerous other notable works.
