= 1950 in radio =

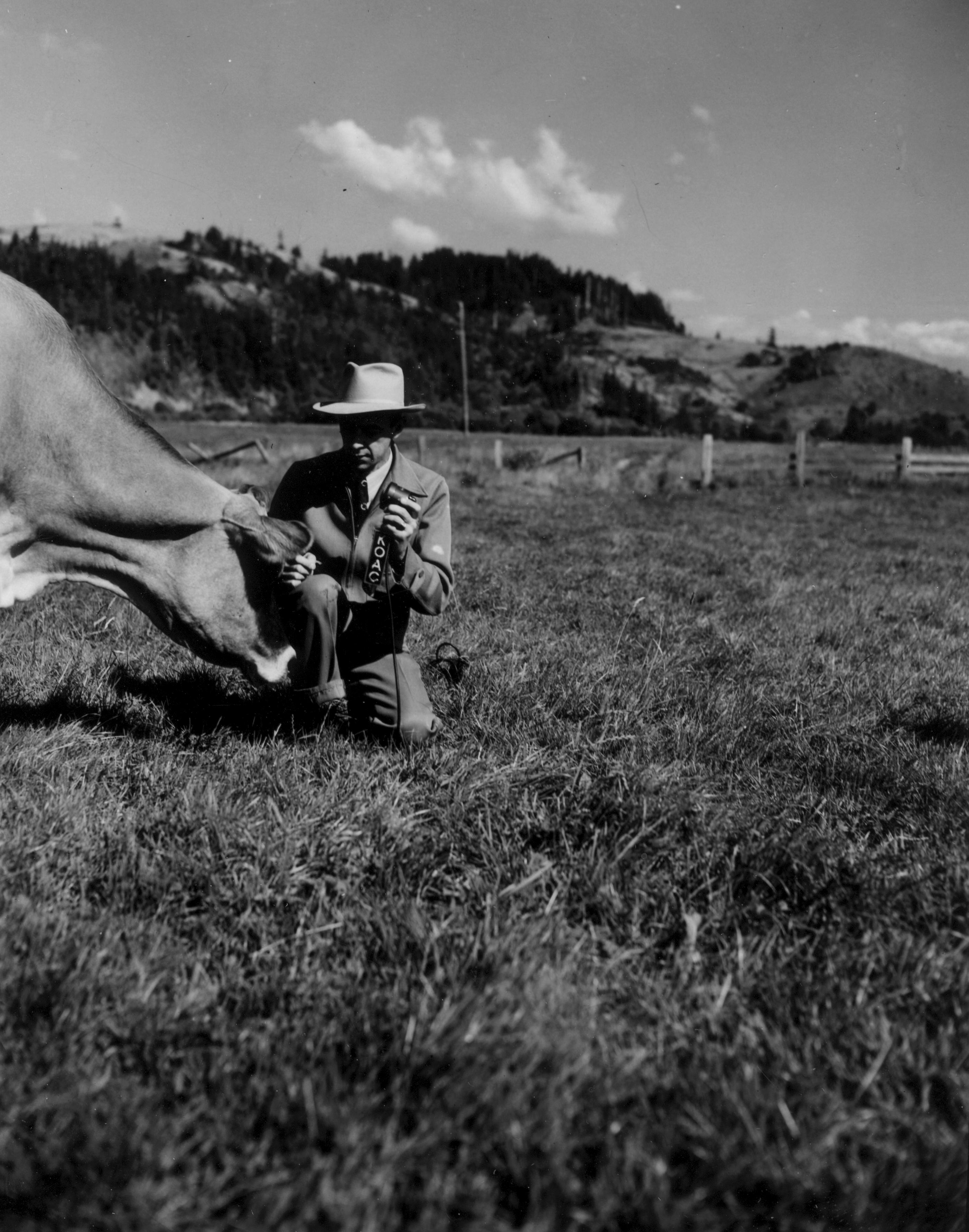
Arnold Ebert of KOAC interviewing a cow in 1950

The year 1950 saw a number of significant happenings in radio broadcasting history.

== Events ==
- 15 March – The Copenhagen Frequency Plan is implemented by broadcasters throughout Europe.
- 15 April – King Leopold III of Belgium offers to surrender his powers temporarily to his 19-year-old son, Prince Baudouin, in an effort to resolve the "Royal question" crisis that follows his plans to return from exile. His radio address to his subjects, in both French and Flemish, marks the first time since 1940 that he has been heard on Belgian radio.
- 1 May – Springbok Radio, South Africa's first commercial radio station, takes to the airwaves. It will broadcast for 35 years, until 31 December 1985.
- 5 June – In the Federal Republic of Germany, Bayerischer Rundfunk, Hessischer Rundfunk, Nordwestdeutscher Rundfunk, Radio Bremen, Süddeutscher Rundfunk, and Südwestfunk jointly establish the ARD consortium of public broadcasting authorities.
- 4 July – Radio Free Europe begins its first broadcasts, transmitting 30 minutes of American programming to Czechoslovakia from a 7,500 watt short wave transmitter located at Lampertheim in West Germany. On 14 July, Romania becomes the second Communist nation to be sent broadcasts from the station.
- 9 July – First propaganda broadcast by an American POW captured by North Korea: a U.S. Army Officer of the 24th Infantry Division makes a 900 word broadcast on Seoul radio.
- 22 July – Leopold III of Belgium returns from exile and addresses the nation by radio but is rapidly forced to announce his abdication.
- 28 July – Red Scare in Japan: NHK, the Japan Broadcasting Corporation, bars more than 100 of its employees suspected of being Japanese Communist Party members or sympathizers from entering its facilities, on instructions of Major Edgar L. Tidwell, the radio officer of the United States Eighth Army.

== Debuts ==
=== Programs ===
- 1 January – Hopalong Cassidy debuts on Mutual.
- 6 January – The Halls of Ivy debuts on NBC.
- 9 January – Hannibal Cobb debuts on ABC.
- 16 January – Listen with Mother debuts on the BBC Light Programme.
- 22 January – The Adventures of Christopher London debuts on NBC.
- 30 January – Mark Trail debuts on Mutual.
- 1 February – Big Jon and Sparkie debuts on ABC.
- 6 February – Dangerous Assignment debuts on NBC.
- 7 May
  - The Big Guy debuts on NBC.
  - Cloak and Dagger debuts on NBC.
- 6 June – Educating Archie debuts on the BBC Light Programme.
- 7 June – The Archers pilot episodes debut on BBC radio; it will still be running 75 years later.
- 2 July – Hashknife Hartley debuts on Mutual.
- 3 July – Granby's Green Acres debuts on CBS.
- 24 September – Charlie Wild, Private Detective debuts on NBC.
- 29 October – Meet Frank Sinatra debuts on CBS.
- 5 November
  - The Big Show introduced by Tallulah Bankhead debuts on NBC.
  - Life with the Lyons starring Ben Lyon and Bebe Daniels debuts on the BBC Light Programme.
- 29 November – I Fly Anything debuts on ABC.
- 6 December – American Agent debuts on ABC.

=== Stations ===
- 12 February – WPAW Pawtucket, Rhode Island signs on for the first time.
- 1 March –WBUR-FM on the air with studios and a 400 watt transmitter located at 84 Exeter Street in Boston.
- 1 March – DZBB, a radio station owned by Republic Broadcasting Systems (later GMA Network) in the Philippines begins broadcasting from its first studios in Calvo Bldg, Bindondo, Manila.
- 19 April – WTSA Brattleboro, Vermont signs on for the first time.
- 4 July – Radio Free Europe begins broadcasting.
- 8 October – WARA Attleboro, Massachusetts signs on for the first time.

== Closings ==
- 6 January – Lora Lawson ends its run on network radio (NBC).
- 19 January – The Better Half ends its run on network radio (Mutual).
- 26 February - Family Hour of Stars ends its run on network radio (CBS).
- 29 March – Curtain Time ends its run on network radio (NBC).
- 30 April – The Adventures of Christopher London ends its run on network radio (NBC).
- 13 May - Young Love ends its run on network radio (CBS).
- 30 May -This Is Your Life ends its run on network radio (CBS).
- 1 June – The Chesterfield Supper Club ends its run on network radio (NBC).
- 6 July – Blondie ends its run on network radio (ABC).
- 21 July – Ladies Be Seated ends its run on network radio (ABC).
- 15 August – Destination Freedom – episodes written by Richard Durham ended – episodes under the same series name continued in 1950
- 21 August – Granby's Green Acres ends its run on network radio (CBS).
- 29 August – The Candid Microphone ends its run on network radio (CBS).
- 1 September – The Adventures of the Thin Man ends its run on network radio (ABC).
- 6 September – Chandu the Magician ends its run on network radio (ABC).
- 15 September – Bride and Groom (radio program) ends its run on network radio (ABC).
- 22 October – Cloak and Dagger ends its run on network radio (NBC).
- 29 October – The Big Guy ends its run on network radio (NBC).

== Births ==
- 2 February – Libby Purves, English radio presenter.
- 14 March – Rick Dees, American radio and television personality.
- 29 April – Paul Holmes, New Zealand broadcaster (died 2013).
- 12 May – Jenni Murray, English journalist, presenter of Woman's Hour.
- 21 May – Marian Finucane, Irish radio presenter (died 2020).
- 27 July – Simon Jones, English actor (Arthur Dent in The Hitchhiker's Guide to the Galaxy).
- 24 September – Alan Colmes, American radio and television talk show host (died 2017).

== Deaths ==
- 13 January – Thomas S. "Tommy" Lee, son of pioneering broadcaster Don Lee, of a suicide. His death triggers the sale of the Don Lee Network (a station group including KFRC AM/FM in San Francisco and KHJ AM/FM in Los Angeles) to General Tire, forerunner of RKO General.
- 26 July – Austin E. Lathrop, owner of Midnight Sun Broadcasting (KFAR, KENI), rail car collision.
- 2 September – Frank Graham, American announcer for many programs and the star (following Jack Webb) of Jeff Regan, Investigator.
