= West County =

West County may refer to

- Contra Costa County, California#West County, the area near or on San Francisco and San Pablo bays
- West County, a name for the western part of St. Louis County, Missouri used by residents of the Greater St. Louis area of Missouri and Illinois

== See also ==
- Dublin County West, a short-lived parliamentary constituency represented in Dáil Éireann, the lower house of the Irish parliament
- West County Center, a shopping mall located in Des Peres, Missouri.
- West County Trail, an electric interurban railway in Sonoma County, California, United States
