= Mandrake the Magician (radio) =

- Genre: Children's radio serial
- Running time: 15 minutes
- Country of origin: United States
- Language: English
- Home station: Mutual Broadcasting System
- Syndicates: WOR
- Starring: Raymond Edward Johnson, Juano Hernandez, Jessica Tandy, Francesca Lenni
- Original release: November 11, 1940 – February 6, 1942

Mandrake the Magician was an American radio show, broadcast on the Mutual Broadcasting System from November 11, 1940 until February 6, 1942. It was based on the comic strip Mandrake the Magician by Lee Falk and Phil Davis.

== History ==
Mandrake the Magician was originally a three-day-a-week radio serial broadcast on the New York City radio station WOR (AM). Each episode was 15 minutes long. It expanded to five days a week in 1941. The serial was recorded at the radio studio in New York. 195 episodes were recorded. Its director was Carlo De Angelo, while Henry Souvaine was its producer.

The serial aimed at a young audience. Every episode opened with Mandrake invoking his chant "Invoco legem magicarum" ("I invoke the laws of magic").

== Cast ==
- Mandrake the Magician: Raymond Edward Johnson
- Lothar: Juano Hernandez
- Princess Narda: Jessica Tandy, Francesca Lenni
