= Brick Bradford (serial) =

1947 film by Spencer Gordon Bennet, Thomas Carr

- Directed by: Spencer Gordon Bennet (as Spencer Bennet); Thomas Carr
- Written by: Clarence Gray (comic strip); William Ritt (comic strip)
- Screenplay by: George H. Plympton; Arthur Hoerl; Lewis Clay
- Produced by: Sam Katzman
- Starring: Kane Richmond; Rick Vallin; Linda Leighton; Pierre Watkin
- Cinematography: Ira H. Morgan
- Edited by: Earl Turner
- Color process: Black and white
- Production company: Sam Katzman Productions
- Distributed by: Columbia Pictures
- Release date: December 18, 1947
- Running time: 257 minutes (15 episodes)
- Country: United States
- Language: English

Brick Bradford (1947) was the 35th serial released by Columbia Pictures. It was based on the comic strip Brick Bradford, which was created by Clarence Gray and William Ritt.

== Plot ==
Brick Bradford is assigned by the government to aid Doctor Gregor Tymak, scientist and inventor who is working on an "Interceptor Ray" that can destroy incoming rockets. Unfortunately, it can also be used as a death ray, bringing it to the attention of foreign spy agent Laydron. Tymak uses his door into the fifth dimension to escape criminals and it takes him to the far side of the Moon (which has air and is a rocky terrain without craters). There he is captured and sentenced to die by freezing to absolute zero by the Queen Khana, despot of the Moon, because they do not believe he has come from the Earth.

The action moves to the Moon as the ray requires a special element called Lunarium (with an atomic mass of 200) previously only found in a meteorite. Working with exiles in the lunar wasteland, the heroes overthrow Queen Khana and return with the Lunarium.

However, the device still requires a formula hidden on an uncharted island 200 years in the past, so Brick and sidekick Sandy Sanderson travel in Tymak's time machine, the Time Top, to retrieve it. The final third of the serial is spent on modern day Earth with more trouble from the spy Laydron.

== Cast ==
- Kane Richmond as Brick Bradford
- Rick Vallin as Sandy Sanderson
- Linda Leighton as June Salisbury (as Linda Johnson)
- Pierre Watkin as Prof. Salisbury
- Charles Quigley as Laydron
- Jack Ingram as Albers
- Fred Graham as Black
- John Merton as Dr. Gregor Tymak
- Leonard Penn as Eric Byrus
- Wheeler Oakman as Louis Walthar
- Carol Forman as Queen Khana
- Charles King as Creed [Ch. 1–7, 9–15]
- John Hart as Dent [Ch. 1–6, 9–15]
- Helene Stanley as Carol Preston [Ch. 4–6]

== Production ==
Brick Bradford was the first of only three science fiction serials released by Columbia.

The serial was broken into three sections, each of which was written by a different screenwriter. The first section, chapters one to five, was written by George Plympton. The middle section, chapters six to ten, was written by Hoerl. The end of the serial, chapters eleven to fifteen, was written by Clay.

== Critical reception ==
Harmon and Glut describes the serial as a "rather shoddy, low budget space cliffhanger." Hoerl's middle segment is full of in-jokes at the serial's expense while the final section by Clay is boring with a constant repetition of capture and escape sequences.

Cline considers Brick Bradford to be a "mediocre serial that enjoyed a wide audience."

== Chapter titles ==
1. Atomic Defense
2. Flight to the Moon
3. Prisoners of the Moon
4. Into the Volcano
5. Bradford at Bay
6. Back to Earth
7. Into Another Century
8. Buried Treasure
9. Trapped in the Time Top
10. The Unseen Hand
11. Poison Gas
12. Door to Disaster
13. Sinister Rendezvous
14. River of Revenge
15. For the Peace of the World

_{Source:}

== Alternative titles ==
- Brick Bradford (Latin America)
- Aventures of Brick Bradford, Les (France)
- Zÿn Avonturen Brick Bradford, En (Belgium)
