= Fred Fredericks =

American cartoonist

- Born: Harold Fredericks, Jr. August 9, 1929
- Died: March 10, 2015 (aged 85) Spouse Francis
- Areas: Penciller, Inker
- Notable works: Mandrake the Magician, The Phantom, Nth Man

Harold "Fred" Fredericks, Jr. (August 9, 1929 – March 10, 2015) was an American cartoonist who drew the Mandrake the Magician comic strip from June 1965, taking over for the late Phil Davis. Creator Lee Falk modernized the comic when Fredericks took over the strip, making it more reality-based by focusing less on science fiction and fantasy, and making Mandrake operate more like a secret agent, often helping out the police with cases they could not solve.

Fredericks is also well known for inking The Phantom Sunday strips 1995 to 2000 (pencilled by George Olesen); Graham Nolan succeeded Fredericks when he decided to concentrate fully on Mandrake.

He was also known for writing the comic strip "Rebel" for Scholastic Magazine from 1964 to the early 1990s, and for drawing the following comic books: Nancy, Boris Karloff, The Twilight Zone, Mighty Mouse, Barney Google and Snuffy Smith, O.G. Whiz presents Tubby, Bullwinkle, Mister Ed and The Munsters. Fredericks also inked several comic books for Marvel Comics and DC Comics, including The Punisher War Journal, Nth Man: the Ultimate Ninja, Defenders of the Earth, Daredevil, Quasar and G.I. Joe.

After Mandrake creator Lee Falk died in 1999, Fredericks became responsible for writing the scripts for the Mandrake strip by himself. The Mandrake Sunday page continued until the final (187th) story, "Shadows on Devil Road", ending December 29, 2002.

In 2013, Fredericks retired, and the Mandrake daily comic strip went into reprints from 1995 beginning on July 8, 2013. He died March 10, 2015.
