= Leon Mandrake =

Italian-American-Canadian magician

Leon Giglio (April 11, 1911 – January 27, 1993), better known by his stage name Leon Mandrake, was an Italian-Canadian magician, mentalist, illusionist, escapologist, ventriloquist and stunt performer known worldwide as Mandrake the Magician, albeit simultaneously and unrelatedly to the comic strip character Mandrake the Magician.

== Early life ==
Born April 11, 1911 in Washington state, Mandrake was very young when his mother brought him to New Westminster, British Columbia on the West Coast of Canada to live with his aunt Mildred. As a child, he watched magicians at the local Edison Theatre and attended circus shows at the Pacific National Exhibition. He studied the great vaudeville magicians when they came to town. One year he was given the props and costumes of a magician who had left the show. He soon learned to perform magic acts from some of the greats of that time, such as Howard Thurston, Alexander (The Man Who Knows), Chefalo, Doc Verge, Ralph Richards (The Wizard) and Bannister. In 1922, at 11 years old, he began his magic career giving vaudeville performances in New Westminster, British Columbia. He took the stage as one of the vaudeville acts of the Edison Theater in New Westminster. In 1925, at 14 years old, he performed at the Moyer's Carnival for the Pacific National Exhibition. By this time, he learned fire-eating, mind-reading and ventriloquism. In 1927, at 16 years old, he joined the Ralph Richards touring magic show for 6 months, traveling across North America until the tour ended in Winnipeg, Manitoba. By the 1930s, he traveled with his own magic show.

== Comic strip ==
Mandrake, the stage magician, known for his black top hat, black cape, and thin handlebar mustache, bears a strong resemblance to the central character in the Mandrake the Magician comic strip. In fact, Leon Mandrake had been performing well over ten years before creator Lee Falk introduced the comic strip character, and today, most people acknowledge the striking physical resemblance between them. Many sources assert that the comic strip character was drawn to resemble Leon. Phil Davis, the strip's artist, did meet Leon Mandrake and they became good friends and corresponded for years. Falk was said to have invented the name Mandrake the Magician coincidentally; though there is no written contract, both parties verbally agreed to cross-promote each other, with the result that Mandrake the Magician became recognized throughout North America.

== Personal life ==
Mandrake was married twice, both times to his chief on-stage assistants. In 1939, he married Narda ("Princess Narda"). Princess Narda also appeared in the Mandrake the Magician comics of the time. When his first marriage ended in 1946, Leon also lost his main assistant. In December 1946, Leon Mandrake's manager, Bernard Abrams, paired him with Louise Salerno, who was an actress, line-dancer and former assistant to well-known magician Blackstone. Leon gave her the stage name Velvet and she became his new assistant. Having grown up on the road with her parents, Vaudeville musicians Betty and Frank Salerno, this was a lifestyle familiar to Leon's new 20-year-old assistant. After two weeks on the road together, Velvet and Leon were married. It was a small marital ceremony, and only two hours later, they were again on stage performing the first of two acts for the evening. They later honed a two-hour magic show for nightclubs during the 1940s and into the 1950s. Their four children, Lon, Ron, Kimball and Geelia were all born on the road. Lon in Illinois, Ron in Florida, Kimball in Ohio, and Geelia in Oregon. In 1958, after Geelia was born, they brought the children to Vancouver B.C., Canada to go to school. The children often stayed with a nanny as Leon and Velvet continued to travel.

== Nightclubs ==
In the 1940s, movies became so popular that many theater performers turned to the nightclubs. The transition was a challenge for most stage magicians as they were accustomed to being in theaters with audiences seated directly in front of the stage and the appropriate stage lighting. In nightclubs, audiences were often sitting on three sides of the performers with less than ideal lighting situations. Also, there was the distraction of alcohol being served and occasional rowdy audience members. Mandrake the Magician was among the very few who were able to make the transition. With his original ideas and devotion to his craft, Mandrake invented new magic acts and innovative ways to perform illusions for nightclubs. Among these performances was his famous "Spook in a Bottle" (aka the Dancing Handkerchief) act.

== Publicity stunts ==
Mandrake kept his image fresh with crowd-pleasing publicity stunts. He was known for driving a car while blindfolded, hypnotizing people to fall asleep in department store windows, making escapes from boxes and doing mind reading on city streets. This kept him and the show on the road.

== Television ==
When television rose in popularity in the 1950s, it became increasingly difficult to keep the live performances going as most people were inclined to stay home and watch TV. Live shows were getting canceled more and more frequently. In 1951, Mandrake bought the rights to former magician Alexander's material and reinvented his image. He started a television show as mentalist "Alexander." He had a series of programs entitled "Alexander the Great" which performed out of Portland, Oregon for 36 weeks and Richland, Washington for 20 weeks in 1955–1956. In 1963, Mandrake made another attempt at TV. This time as himself, performing with Velvet before a live audience on CBC's "Mandrake Special." In 1970, Mandrake was on CBC television series "The Manipulators" and in 1977, he played himself on an episode of "The Beachcombers."

== On the road ==
Mandrake the Magician often went back out on the road with wife and assistant Velvet. As the nightclub shows became less and less popular, they brought back old carnival acts such as fire-eating, palm reading, balloon tricks, and ventriloquism to street fairs in the summers, home shows, conventions.

== Lectures ==
Between road shows in the 1970s, he gave lectures on the occult, mysticism and Eastern philosophy at different universities in British Columbia, Canada.

== Awards ==
On March 11, 1978, Leon Mandrake was honored by his peers for his lifelong service to the profession. He was awarded the Performing Fellowship at the Academy of the Magical Arts (The World Famous Hollywood The Magic Castle). The award acknowledged the contribution to the dignity and stature of magic made by Leon and Velvet Mandrake over their lifetime in magic.

== Last show and later life ==
Mandrake performed his last magic show in 1985 for the Chocolate Festival in Victoria, British Columbia, Canada, ending a 62-year career in show business. He died of emphysema at Surrey Memorial Hospital on January 27, 1993. A wake was held at the old Edison Theater in New Westminster, now the Paramount Theater, the first place Mandrake worked as a child magician.

On August 28, 2016, Mandrake's home until his death, located at the corner of Grosvenor Road and Kindersley Drive in Surrey, British Columbia, was engulfed in flame and destroyed, displacing several homeless persons. Surrey City Council had considered giving heritage status to the old, abandoned home, and it was still being considered for heritage status as recently as May 2015. Mandrake's son Lon has stated that during his childhood the home contained secret rooms and passages.

== Biography and documentary ==
- Mandrake the Incomparable (Hades Publications Inc.) is a biography written in 1998.
- Mandrake, A Magical Life is a 2001 documentary.
