= Healthy Weight Commitment Foundation =

American organization

The Healthy Weight Commitment Foundation is an organization of American food and beverage companies formed with the stated aim of decreasing the number of calories in the U.S. marketplace. It was announced in October 2009, by the then-CEO of Kellogg's, A. D. David Mackay.

== Members ==
The organization has 16 companies as members, including The Coca-Cola Company, PepsiCo, General Mills, Campbell's, and ConAgra Foods. The companies that constitute the Foundation's membership together produce between 20 and 25 percent of the food consumed in the United States. In 2010, the organization pledged to decrease the number of calories its members collectively sold in the United States in 2012 by 1 trillion relative to a 2007 baseline. The Foundation also aimed to reduce this number by 1.5 trillion by 2015.

== Evaluation ==
A 2014 study found that the pledge had led to a reduction in calories sold in the U.S. marketplace by 6.4 trillion calories, more than four times the amount they had pledged to cut by the following year.
