= Ray Moore (comics) =

American comic strip artist (1905–1984)

- Born: Raymond S. Moore; February 27, 1905 Montgomery City, Missouri, U.S.
- Died: January 13, 1984 (aged 78) Kirkwood, Missouri, U.S.
- Area: Artist
- Notable works: The Phantom (1936–1942)
- Collaborators: Lee Falk
- Spouse: Claire

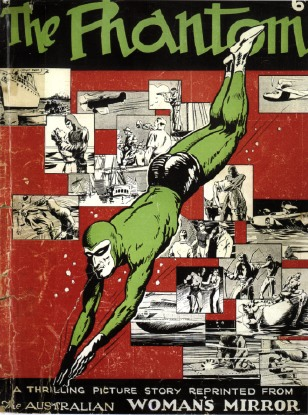
Australian Woman's Mirror, featuring the story "The Singh Brotherhood". Drawn by Ray Moore.

Raymond S. Moore (February 27, 1905 – January 13, 1984) was an American comic strip artist. After Lee Falk, he was the first artist on what would become the world's most popular adventure comic strip, The Phantom, which started in 1936.

== Biography ==
Moore was born in Montgomery City, Missouri, in 1905. He was the son of a jeweler and clockmaker, and originally intended to become an engineer (at the request of his father), before he realised that he could live off his job as an artist. He attended Washington University Art School in St. Louis.

Moore started drawing The Phantom in 1936 after creator Falk realized, two weeks into the strip, that he would not have the time to do the artwork in the strip himself. Moore had previously worked as Phil Davis' assistant on the Lee Falk-created Mandrake the Magician comic strip, which was why he was thought to be a suitable choice to draw Falk's new creation.

Moore shared an art studio with Wilson McCoy. In 1941, when Moore went to serve in the military during the Second World War, McCoy took over the responsibilities of illustrating The Phantom. After his return from the war, Moore focused on the Sunday page only but was forced to retire in 1947.

Differing sources conflict in their accounts of the transition from Moore to McCoy. In a 1978 interview with Phantom writer Falk, he described the change this way: McCoy was Moore's assistant and good friend. When Moore was called into the military, McCoy took over and he also continued when Moore came back. From then on Moore drew on extremely rare occasions, but he was still on the pay list, and at first his signature was also on some of the series he did not draw. In yet another interview, Falk stated, "Ray only drew it for three or four years, then he went off to war as a pilot. Then Wilson McCoy, who was a friend of his, ... took over in his absence. But he kept Ray's name on it right through the war.

=== Personal life and death ===
Moore was known to be as mysterious as the Phantom character he illustrated. He lived most of his life in Missouri, together with his wife, Claire. Prior to 2011, only two photos of him were known to exist, both in profile. His face was therefore quite unknown to the world. And if he on a rare occasion did an interview, he seldom mentioned his private life.

The idea of the Phantom's pet wolf Devil is believed to have come from Moore's lifelong pleasure of drawing wolves and his love of dogs.

Ray Moore died in Manchester, Missouri, in 1984 of a stroke. He was survived by his wife, Claire, who died in 2005; Mary Adelia Moore (now deceased); his younger brother, David Yerly Moore Jr.; his nephew, John Alt Moore; and his great-nieces, Maria Moore Zeig and Gina Moore Reiners. 13 acres (53,000 m^{2}) of woodland that Claire and Ray owned in Des Peres, Missouri was donated to the Missouri Department of Conservation and named "Phantom Forest" after his comic strip hero.

In July 2011, in appreciation for Phantom fans worldwide and in honor of the 75th Anniversary of the Phantom comic strip, his great-niece Gina Moore Reiners made public a series of Moore family photographs ranging from Ray Moore's childhood to adulthood.

== Art style ==
Ray Moore had a moody and mysterious drawing style, with a style of shadowing that suited the mysterious Phantom character. Moore's initial artwork on The Phantom was influenced by the work of Alex Raymond. Moore slightly changed his style later on, focusing less on the dark atmosphere he had become known for, in favor of a more realistic style, with more details and a less moody style of drawing.

Moore would sometimes use his wife Claire as a model when drawing the Phantom's girlfriend, Diana Palmer.

Lee Falk always claimed that Moore was the best artist on the Phantom, because of his talent for drawing beautiful women. It was this talent that led Falk to create many crime corporations only consisting of women, like the infamous Sky Band.

== Tributes ==
In Paramount Pictures' The Phantom film adaptation, starring Billy Zane, the butler of the Palmer family is called "Falkmoore", a reference to Lee Falk and Ray Moore.

== List of the daily strip stories drawn by Ray Moore ==
The first Phantom Sunday strip from May 28, 1939. Art by Ray Moore.

1. "The Singh Brotherhood"
2. "The Sky Band"
3. "The Diamond Hunters"
4. "Little Tommy"
5. "The Prisoner of the Himalayas"
6. "Adventure in Algiers"
7. "The Shark's Nest"
8. "Fishers of Pearls"
9. "The Slave Traders"
10. "The Mysterious Girl"
11. "The Golden Circle"
12. "The Seahorse"
13. "The Game of Alvar"
14. "Diana Aviatrix"
15. "The Phantom's Treasure"
16. "The Phantom Goes to War"

All of these stories have been reprinted, in Australia by Frew Publications, and in the United States by Pacific Comics Club or Comics Revue magazine.

== List of Sunday strip stories drawn by Ray Moore ==
- 1 "The League of Lost Men"
- 2 "The Precious Cargo of Colonel Winn"
- 3 "The Fire Goddess"
- 4 "The Beachcomber"
- 5 "The Saboteurs"
- 6 "The Return of the Sky Band"
- 7 "The Impostor"
- 8 "Castle in the Clouds" (with Wilson McCoy)
- 14 "Queen Pera The Perfect"
- 15 "King of Beasts"
- 16 "The Scarlet Sorceress" (with Wilson McCoy)
- 17 "The Twelve Tasks" (with Wilson McCoy)
- 18 "The Dragon God"
- 19 "The Marshall Sisters" (with Wilson McCoy)
- 20 "The Phantom Trophy" (with Wilson McCoy)
- 21 "The Haunted Castle" (with Wilson McCoy)
