= Bittersweet Woods Conservation Area =

Protected land in Missouri, U.S.

- Interactive map of Bittersweet Woods Conservation Area
- Type: Missouri Department of Conservation
- Location: City of Des Peres, St. Louis County, Missouri
- Coordinates: 38°35′17″N 90°27′37″W
- Area: 10 acres (4.0 ha)
- Created: 2008
- Operator: City Of Des Peres
- Status: Open all year

Bittersweet Woods Conservation Area is a 10-acre (4 ha) park located in the city of Des Peres in St. Louis County, Missouri. Positioned deep in suburban St. Louis, Bittersweet Woods offers outdoor recreational opportunities to nearby communities. The park is located on Barrett Station Road between Manchester Road and Dougherty Ferry Road.

== History ==
The land was formerly owned by Jean and Joan Goodson. They donated 10 acres to the Missouri Department of Conservation in 1997, with the remaining land being used to develop subdivisions nearby. Opened in 2008, the park is owned by the Missouri Department of Conservation, but leased and maintained by the city of Des Peres.

== Activities and Amenities ==
Bittersweet Woods can only be publicly accessed through the adjacent Phantom Forest. A small paved parking lot sits on Barrett Station Road and provides auto access to Phantom Forest. The one half mile dirt trail connects to the Bittersweet Woods Conservation Area. The park consists of deciduous forest. Hiking is permitted, but not biking or horseback riding. Bird watching and nature viewing are additional amenities in the park.
