= Paul Norris =

American comic book artist (1914–2007)

- Born: Paul Leroy Norris; April 26, 1914 Greenville, Ohio, U.S.
- Died: November 5, 2007 (aged 93) Oceanside, California, U.S.
- Areas: Cartoonist, Penciller, Inker
- Notable works: Aquaman; Brick Bradford
- Awards: Inkpot Award (1993)
- Children: Michael Norris

Paul Leroy Norris (April 26, 1914 – November 5, 2007) was an American comic book artist best known as co-creator of the DC Comics superhero Aquaman, and for a 35-year run as artist and writer of the newspaper comic strip Brick Bradford.

== Biography ==
=== Early life and career ===
Paul Norris was born in Greenville, Ohio, the son of Lesta (Arnett) and Leroy Norris. Beginning 1934, during the Great Depression, he spent two years at Midland Lutheran College in Fremont, Nebraska at the behest of his cousin, Dr. Emerson Reck, a journalism professor and director of the school's news bureau. Self-described as having been "drawing pictures from the first time I could hold a pencil," Norris became art director of The Warrior, the college yearbook, and also performed in plays, served as president of the campus YMCA, and painted signs for businesses.

After two years, Norris left college in an aborted attempt to pursue a career as comic strip cartoonist. He recalled in 2006,

I left Midland ... to pursue the publication of a comic strip (Hobo Cupboard). Emerson’s brother Myron was in radio in Chicago. He had written a script for a comic strip and I was to draw it, which I did. Myron sold it to a syndicate in Ohio. As was the custom the syndicate wanted six weeks of the strip in advance. I couldn't get that much work done and keep up the chores and studies I had [at] Midland. So I returned to Ohio to get the strip ready for publication. Well, before I finished the six weeks of artwork the syndicate folded. I was out of college and out of work...."

Norris worked on his grandmother's farm before obtaining a job at an electric-motor assembly plant in Dayton, Ohio. He also enrolled at the Dayton Art Institute School, where he met his wife of 61 years, Ann, whom he married in 1939. He went on to become an illustrator and cartoonist for the Dayton Daily News.

=== Aquaman and Sandman ===
In 1940, Norris and his wife moved to New York City, New York, where he created the features "Power Nelson, Futureman", and "Yank & Doodle" for the comic-book publisher Prize Publications. Historians tentatively identify Norris' comic-book debut as penciling and inking the cover of Prize Publications' Prize Comics #6 (Aug. 1940), with his first confirmed credit the Power Nelson story "Introducing Gene West" two issues later. Norris' first confirmed credit for DC Comics (then National Comics) is the story "The Sandman at Sea", starring DC's original Sandman, Wesley Dodds, in Adventure Comics #65 (Aug. 1941). Norris and writer Mort Weisinger revamped that character in superhero attire and introduced sidekick Sandy the Golden Boy in issue #69 (Dec. 1941).

Norris and Weisinger introduced the undersea superhero Aquaman in the eight-page story "The Submarine Strikes" in More Fun Comics # 73 (Nov. 1941). That same year, Norris began drawing the adventure comic strip Vic Jordan for PM, one of the New York's daily afternoon papers. Norris said in 2007 that he had inadvertently signed an exclusive contract with PM and not realized this for a year, after which he had to give up the "Aquaman" feature. In 1943, King Features Syndicate assigned Norris to write and draw the existing strip Secret Agent X-9, on which he worked for three months before being drafted into the U.S. Army.

=== World War II ===
Norris said that during his World War II military service as a tech sergeant, "I did a little [comic] strip for the ship newspaper" that came to the attention of Lieutenant General Simon Bolivar Buckner, Jr. "He saw it and made the order that I be transferred from the 82nd Signal Battalion to JIC POA 10th Army", where Norris illustrated propaganda leaflets to be dropped from aircraft over Okinawa, urging Japanese soldiers to surrender. "I worked with a prisoner of war. We wanted the translations to be authentic". Norris in 2006 recalled the POW as George Totari, formerly a reporter for an English-language newspaper in Japan.

While Norris told one interviewer that, "The Japanese came in with these things in their hands and wanted to surrender", he told another that the leaflet, designed to look like a comic-book page, had not yet gone into print when the atomic bomb was dropped on Japan, scuttling the project.

=== Brick Bradford and Gold Key ===
Following the war, Norris did some covers featuring Buck Rogers for Four Color, including issues 190, 204, and 247. Norris was rehired by King Features Syndicate, and in 1948 began drawing the Sunday edition of Austin Briggs' comic strip Jungle Jim. He continued to freelance for DC Comics through 1953, drawing the detective feature "Captain Compass" in most issues of Star Spangled Comics #106–130 (July 1950 – July 1952), and the super-speedster feature "Johnny Quick" in Adventure Comics #171–186 (Dec. 1951 – March 1953).

In 1952, Norris succeeded artist Clarence Gray on the science-fiction comic strip Brick Bradford, continuing to draw it for 35 years until his and the strip's retirement in 1987. The final daily appeared April 25, 1987.

As well in the 1950s, Norris drew issues of Dell Comics' Tom Corbett, Space Cadet and Jungle Jim, the latter of which he had previously drawn as a newspaper comic strip. The following decade, he drew stories of jungle adventurer Tarzan and science-fiction hero Magnus, Robot Fighter in comic books for Gold Key Comics.

With writer Gaylord DuBois, Norris co-created the Gold Key jungle characters Kono and Tono in the namesake series The Jungle Twins, which ran 17 original issues (April 1972 – Nov. 1975), followed by reprints.

Norris' last known comics story is co-penciling (with Roman Arambula and Scott Shaw) the cover and the 17-page talking animal feature "Now You See Them...", starring Yogi Bear, Scooby-Doo, and a plethora of other Hanna-Barbera animated TV series characters, in Marvel Comics' Laff-A-Lympics #10 (Dec. 1978). His last comics work was a drawing of Aquaman in DC Comics' multi-artist, multi-character "History of the DC Universe" poster in 1987.

=== Later life ===
Norris was living in Oceanside, California, at the time of his death. Norris and his wife Ann, who died in 2000, had two sons, Michael and Paul Jr. (called Reed). Norris is buried in Glen Haven Memorial Gardens in New Carlisle, Ohio.
