= Raymond Edward Johnson =

American radio and stage actor (1911–2001)

- Illustration of Raymond Edward Johnson in newspaper ad from the early 1940s.
- Born: July 24, 1911; Kenosha, Wisconsin
- Died: August 15, 2001, age 90
- Occupation: Actor
- Known for: Acting on Inner Sanctum Mysteries on radio
- Spouse: Betty Caine

Raymond Edward Johnson (July 24, 1911 – August 15, 2001) was an American radio and stage actor best remembered for his work on Inner Sanctum Mysteries.

== Early years ==
Born in Kenosha, Wisconsin, Johnson started out as a bank teller, and later studied acting at the Goodman School of Drama in Chicago.

== Radio ==
Johnson began his career in Chicago, some of his earliest work including a regular role on Edgar A. Guest's dramatic serial Welcome Valley (1932–1937) as Bill Sutter, and was featured on The National Farm and Home Hour in dramatic sketches as the Forest Ranger (a role also played by Don Ameche).

=== Chicago to New York ===
While in Chicago, Johnson began working with writer/director Arch Oboler, with roles on his Lights Out series. When both Oboler and Johnson relocated to New York City, the actor was featured in many episodes of Arch Oboler's Plays, notably as the title role in "The Ugliest Man in the World" (repeated five times) and as Pyotr Ilyich Tchaikovsky in "This Lonely Heart" both from 1939.

=== Inner Sanctum ===
While in New York, Johnson landed his most famous role when Himan Brown hired him for Inner Sanctum. From the first broadcast in 1941, Johnson was heard as the series host/narrator, introducing himself as "Your host, Raymond." The "Raymond" character became known for his chilling introductions and morbid puns, and his typical closing, an elongated and ironic "Pleasant dreaaaams, hmmmmmmm?" Johnson departed the series in 1945, when he joined the Army; although replaced for the remainder of the run by Paul McGrath as host, Johnson took the "Raymond" name with him. Johnson later hosted the radio version of the science fiction series Tales of Tomorrow.

=== Soap operas ===
In both New York and Chicago, he was a staple on many soap operas, playing romantic leads on Big Sister (as Dr. Bernard), on the radio version of The Guiding Light (as enigmatic stranger Ellis Smith), 1943's Brave Tomorrow (as Hal Lambert), Kate Hopkins, Angel of Mercy (as Robert Atwood) and Valiant Lady (as Paul Morrison). His sister, Dora Johnson Remington, was also a soap staple, playing Evey on Ma Perkins.

=== Other programs ===
Johnson was also heard as Mr. District Attorney in 1939, Roger Kilgore, Public Defender, Calling All Cars, and starred in radio adaptations of the comic strips Don Winslow of the Navy and Mandrake the Magician.

Still other radio dramas included appearances on such diverse anthologies as Cavalcade of America, Gangbusters, Dimension X (and its sequel X Minus One), the wartime series Words at War, Famous Jury Trials and Cloak and Dagger.

Johnson provided the voice of Abraham Lincoln on the Decca recording of Earl Robinson’s and Millard Lampell’s "folk cantata," The Lonesome Train, 21–22 March 1944.

== Broadway ==
On stage, Johnson starred as Thomas Jefferson in Sidney Kingsley's Broadway play The Patriots, in 1943.

== Film ==
Johnson's few on-camera appearances included the role of Alexander Graham Bell in the 1947 film Mr. Bell.

== Later years ==
Stricken with multiple sclerosis from his 40s onward, limiting his activities in later years, Johnson was still a frequent presence at old time radio conventions, performing in recreations and reprising "Raymond", often from a portable bed or wheelchair. He died not long after his 90th birthday.

== Family ==
Johnson was married to radio actress Betty Caine.
