= Ace Comics =

Comic book series

Publication information
- Publisher: David McKay Publications
- Schedule: Monthly
- Format: Ongoing series
- Publication date: 1937–1949

Ace Comics was a comic book series published by David McKay Publications between 1937 and 1949 – starting just before the Golden Age of Comic Books. The title reprinted syndicated newspaper strips owned by King Features Syndicate, following the successful formula of a mix of adventure and humor strips introduced by McKay in their King Comics title in April 1936; some of the strips were transferred from King Comics and continued in Ace Comics from issue #1. Ace Comics #11, the first appearance of The Phantom, is regarded by many to be a key issue in the history of comics, as it introduced to the comics format one of the first of the costumed heroes, leading to the Golden Age of superheroes in comics.

== Publication history ==
The first issue of Ace Comics was published in April 1937, and included the adventures of hunter Jungle Jim written by Flash Gordon writer Alex Raymond, Chic Young's Blondie, and George Herriman's surreal Krazy Kat strip, all three characters going on to appear in every issue of Ace Comics. Issue #11 (cover date February 1938) is notable as a key Golden Age comic, as it introduced to a wider audience one of the first costumed heroes ever to be featured in a comic book, Lee Falk's The Phantom — pre-dating Superman (Action Comics #1, cover date June 1938). The Phantom daily strip, written by Lee Falk and drawn by Ray Moore, then featured in Ace Comics for a 140-issue run, appearing in every issue until the title was cancelled. Initially The Phantom was a four-page story, but from #38 this was increased to eight pages in each issue. Towards the end of the run, the Sunday strips were also included. Many of the strips were edited and cropped from the original newspaper stories, and the text was often rewritten also.

As well as Jungle Jim and The Phantom, which ran throughout the series, Hal Foster's knight's tale of Prince Valiant was also a long-running adventure feature, published in issues 26-134. Other adventure strips that appeared included Zane Grey's Western character Tex Thorne in early issues, the adventures of orphan Tim Tyler in Tim Tyler's Luck and Curley Harper at Lakespur both by Blondie writer/artist Chic Young's brother Lyman Young. Tim Tyler's Luck ran in every issue of Ace Comics, while the Curley Harper strip ended with issue 100, although a single strip just called Curley Harper appeared in issue #107. Later issues reprinted the Flash Gordon-like space adventures of Brick Bradford and The Lone Ranger strip, both transferred from the King Comics title.

The Blondie strip also appeared in every issue of Ace Comics, as did classic the humor strip The Katzenjammer Kids by Rudolph Dirks. Other humor strips included Pete the Tramp by Clarence D. Russell, Tillie the Toiler by Russ Westover, Billy DeBeck's Barney Google, Jimmy Hatlo's They'll Do It Every Time and Paul Robinson's Etta Kett were presented throughout the run, although all of these titles missed the odd issue. The strip Seein' Stars which ran in the first 50 issues, was written by Arthur Beeman and was based around the Hollywood film industry — cartoon versions of a number of Hollywood stars, including Fred Astaire, Betty Grable and Judy Garland guested.

Drawn in a similar style to Winsor McCay's work, the fantasy strip The Pussycat Princess (a story originally titled Pussycat Princess, A Fairytale For Boys, Girls And Other Children), by Grace Drayton and Ed Anthony, also featured in early issues of Ace Comics run. Drayton was a well-known and important early cartoonist who died only a year after starting this delightful fairytale series. Another classic Golden Age artist whose work appeared in a number of issues was C.C.Beck (creator of Fawcett's Captain Marvel). Six issues of Ace Comics contained single-page Captain Tootsie strips - advertisements for Tootsie Roll confectionery with a short adventure on the page, with a costume patterned on Captain Marvel's.

As well as syndicated strips, most issues also carried text stories, editorials, and factual pages. Many of the stories, such as White Buffalo in issues #35-36, were written by R. G. Montgomery, who wrote short Western tales in magazines in the 1920s and 1930s. Ruth Plumly Thompson, who wrote a number of the books in the Oz series after L. Frank Baum died in 1919, also wrote a considerable number of editorial pages. Ace Comics also featured single-panel cartoons, probably the best known of which, Private Breger Abroad, was drawn by celebrated World War II cartoonist Dave Breger. The factual strip Ripley's Believe It or Not! was reprinted in early issues of Ace Comics, while other factual pages, such as Stamp Spotlight, Sports In Pictures and News In Pictures, appeared regularly at various times during the run. Two series in 1941-2 covered the early events of World War II at sea — Battle of the Atlantic and Battle for the Seven Seas. These were written and drawn by Edgar Franklin Wittmack, known for his stylized magazine covers in the 1920s and 1930s.

An unusual feature for the day was the Young Reporters page, which included readers' letters and comments. Competitions and prizes were also advertised in early numbers, and puzzle pages were also featured.

Ace Comics was cancelled with issue #151 (October 1949), although as that issue contained an ad for the next Phantom series, it can be assumed the decision on cancellation was made after #151 left the printer.

== List of appearances ==
Below is a list of the main strips Ace Comics ran throughout the series, with the issues they appeared in. Some long-running series missed the occasional issue, for these the first and last issue of the run is noted. For shorter run titles, the list shows each appearance.

Information available on issues 1-16 and 133-151 appears to be limited at present. As a result, it has not been possible to produce a definitive list. Issues with a ? against them are the earliest or latest possible issue this character's strip appeared in.

- Barney Google (most issues 1-1 151)
- Battle of the Atlantic issues 55, 57, 58, 60
- Battle of the Seven Seas issues 61, 66, 70, 72, 73, 75
- Blondie issues 01–151
- Brick Bradford issues 128–151?
- Captain Tootsie issues 76, 86, 87, 90, 99, 100
- Curly Harper at Lakespur issues 1–100, 107
- Cyrano de Bergerac Jnr issues 26–32
- Daffy Doodles (most issues)
- Dreamland (various issues to #20)
- Elmer' issues 1–100
- Etta Kett issues 1?–37
- Henry (various issues 57–138)
- Jungle Jim issues 01–?
- Krazy Kat issues 01–37
- The Katzenjammer Kids issues 01–151
- Just Kids issues 1?–100 107
- The Lone Ranger issues 135– 151?
- News in Pictures issues 54–70?
- Nicodemus O'Malley and His Whale, Palsy Walsy issues 1?–32
- Pete the Tramp (most issues 1–151)
- The Phantom issues 11–151
- Prince Valiant issues 26–134
- Private Breger Abroad (most issues 72–106)
- Private Buck issue 57
- Pussycat Princess issues 10?–37
- Ripley's Believe It or Not! issues 01–26?
- Room and Board issues 1?–50?
- Seein' Stars issues 1?–65
- Sport in Pictures (various issues from 1–74?)
- Teddy And Sitting Bull issues 1?–151?
- Tex Thorne issue 1–14?
- They'll Do It Every Time issues 10?–127?
- Tillie the Toiler (most issues 1?–127)
- Tim Tyler's Luck issues 1–151

== See also ==
- King Comics
