= Phantom Forest Conservation Area =

13-acre park in the city of Des Peres in St. Louis County, Missouri

- Interactive map of Phantom Forest Conservation Area
- Type: Missouri Department of Conservation
- Location: City of Des Peres, St. Louis County, Missouri
- Coordinates: 38.58546°N 90.46610°W
- Area: 13 acres (5.3 ha)
- Created: 2006
- Operator: City Of Des Peres
- Status: Open all year

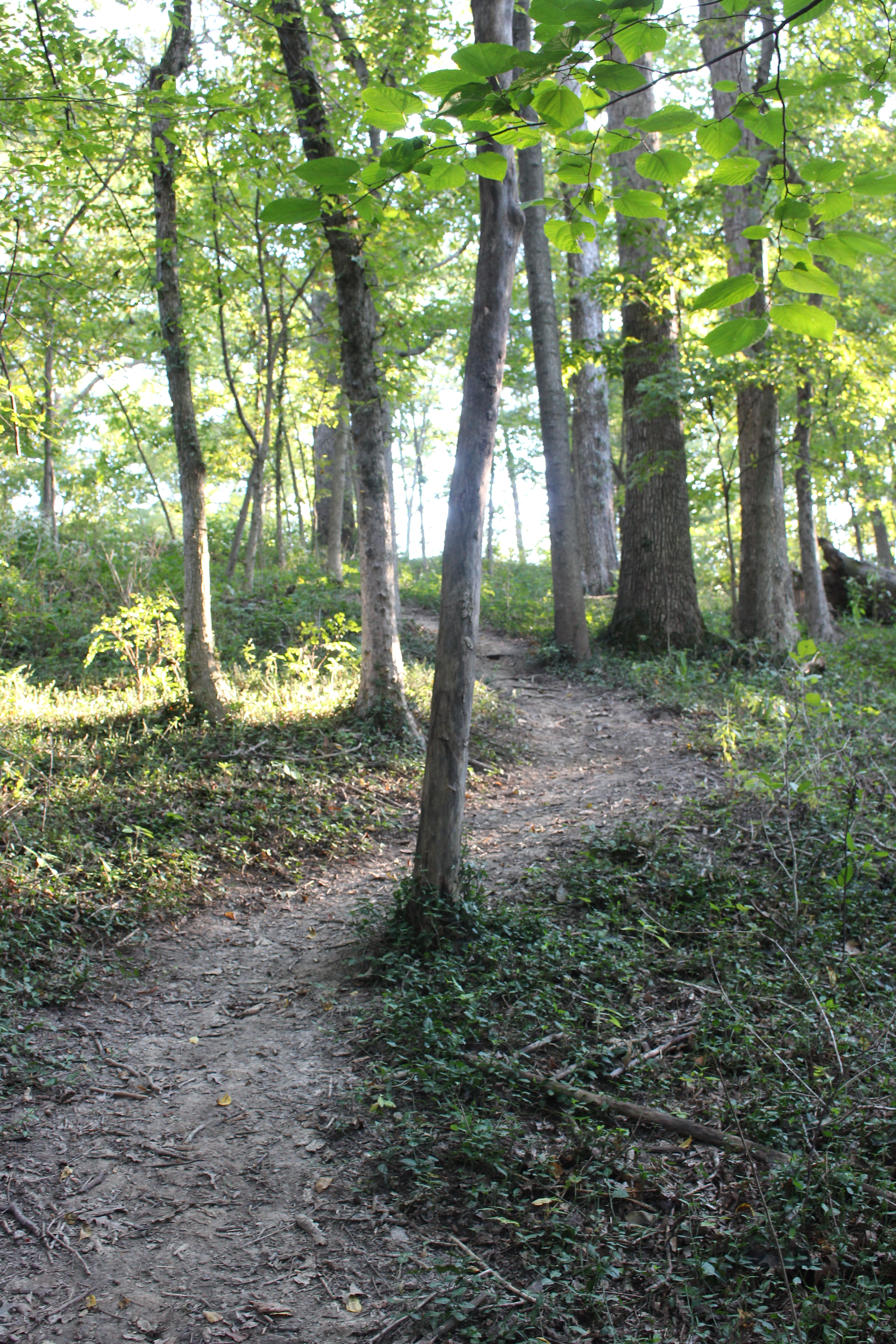
Winding Path

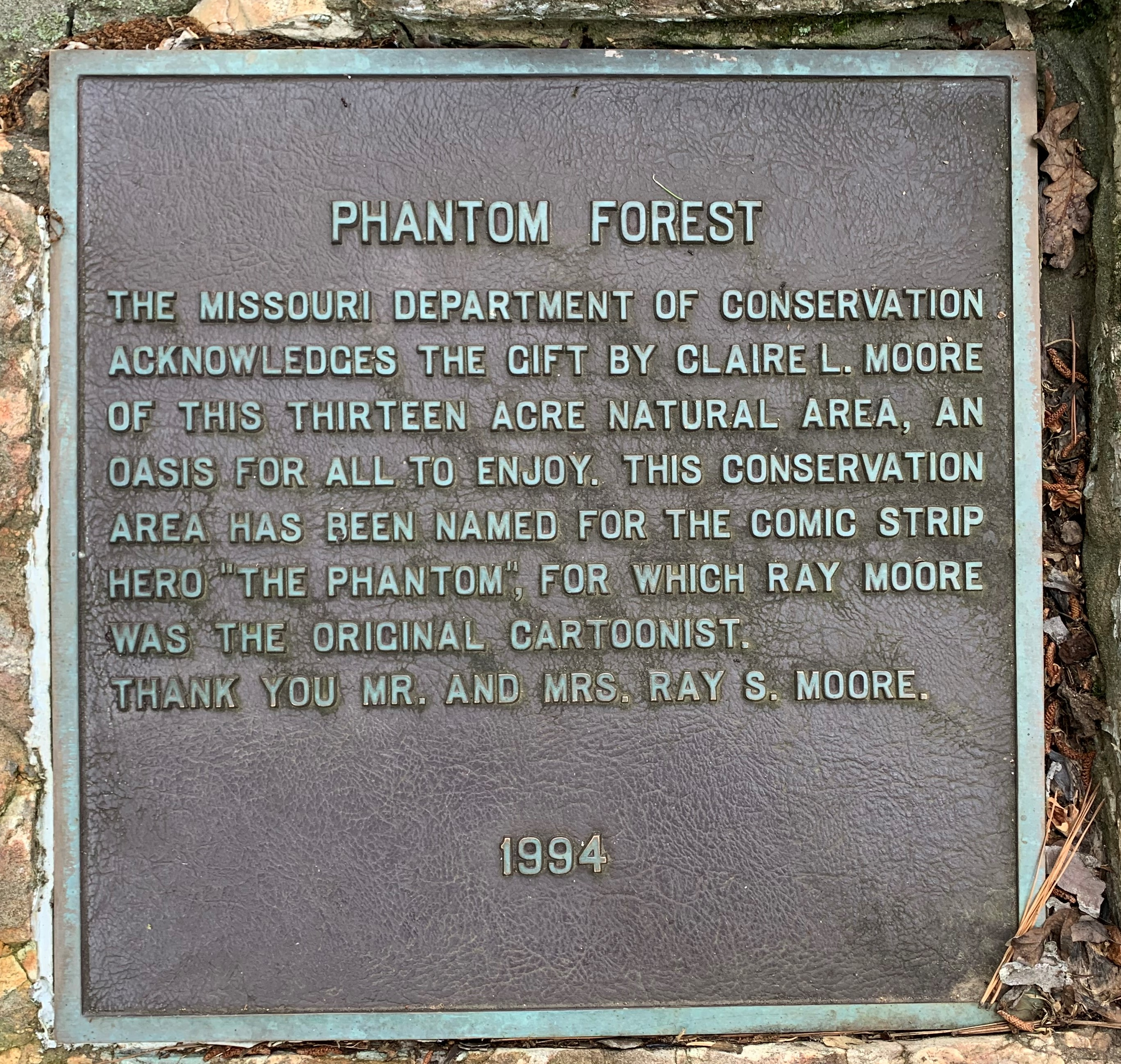
Phantom Forest Plaque

Phantom Forest Conservation Area is a 13-acre (5.3 ha) park located in the city of Des Peres in St. Louis County, Missouri. Positioned deep in suburban St. Louis, Phantom Forest offers outdoor recreational opportunities to nearby communities. The park is located on Barrett Station Road between Manchester Road and Dougherty Ferry Road.

== History ==
The land was formerly owned by Ray Moore and his wife, Claire. Ray Moore was the original illustrator for The Phantom comic strip. After he died, his wife donated the land to the Missouri Department of Conservation in 1994. The park was named Phantom Forest in his honor. Phantom Forest is leased by and maintained by the city of Des Peres, Missouri. The park was leased beginning in 2006 and opened to the public in 2008.

== Activities and amenities ==
A small paved parking lot sits on Barrett Station Road and provides auto access to the park. A dirt trail leads into the park. The one half mile trail connects to the Bittersweet Woods Conservation Area. Phantom Forest consists of deciduous forest. Hiking is permitted, but not biking or horseback riding. The trail difficulty level is described as easy. The remains of an old house, barely visible from the trail, sits within the conservation area. Past the old house is a very small clearing with a bench and plaque commemorating Claire's donation. Bird watching and nature viewing are additional amenities in the park.
