= Captain Compass =

Publication information
- First appearance: Star Spangled Comics #83 (Aug. 1948)

In-story information
- Alter ego: Mark Compass
- Team affiliations: United States Navy

Captain Compass is a character in the DC Comics universe first appearing in 1948 in an issue of Star Spangled Comics, as a replacement for the original Robotman strip.

The early stories of naval detective Captain Compass were primarily detective fiction, but later stories included elements of the paranormal.

His design was created by artist Jimmy Thompson, though the writer who originally created him (if this was not also Thompson) is unknown.

== Fictional biography ==
A former private detective, Mark Compass is hired by the Penny Steamship Lines shipping company as a troubleshooter. In his early appearances his adventures take places aboard the fictional SS Nautilus, but later stories have Compass in other settings. At various points in his career, he is depicted as being employed in different, generally naval contexts; for example, in one strip he is demoted to steamship captain. He fights criminals, pirates and people who live on lost islands.

== Publication history ==
- Star Spangled Comics #83-130 (Aug. 1948 - July 1952)
- World's Finest Comics #63 (March/April 1953)
- Detective Comics #203-224 (Jan. 1954 - Oct. 1955)
- Detective Comics #500 (March 1981)

Early stories in Star Spangled Comics are almost exclusively detective fiction on the high seas. In later issues, an element of the supernatural is introduced. This first occurs in Star Spangled Comics #96, in which Captain Compass and his ship sail through a whirlpool to another dimension, or possibly time-travel. Other adventures include conflicts with mechanical whales and prehistoric dinosaurs. Though created by Jimmy Thompson, the regular penciller on these Compass strips was Paul Norris.

When Star Spangled Comics switched formats, the Captain Compass feature was replaced by one starring Doctor Thirteen The Compass feature was revived in World's Finest Comics the following year. After this, his features switches to Detective Comics, where it remained until its final entry, in Detective Comics #224 (Oct. 1955). His feature was replaced by one starring the new character Martian Manhunter.

== Modern appearances ==
Captain Compass appeared alongside the Martian Manhunter / J'onn J'onnz when J'onnz signed onto Compass' ship to investigate the murder of a sea captain's daughter. Compass also aided the Justice League after the departure of Green Arrow.

Captain Compass appeared sporadically in subsequent issues of Detective Comics, including #500 (March 1981) where he joined forces with other detective characters such as Slam Bradley and the Human Target to solve one last case. After this issue, he appears in a DC Comics reprint set, Best of DC Digest in 1982. His grandson Martin Compass, a podcaster, appears in Detective Comics #1027 (Nov. 2020).
