= Des Peres, Missouri =

- City
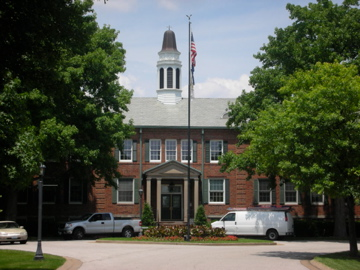
- Des Peres City Hall predates the city's incorporation. It was originally built by the neighboring Lutheran Church as an orphanage.

- Flag

- Location of Des Peres, Missouri
- Coordinates: 38°35′51″N 90°26′53″W
- Country: United States
- State: Missouri
- County: St. Louis
- Townships: Missouri River, Queeny, Bonhomme

Area
  - Total: 4.32 sq mi (11.20 km^{2})
  - Land: 4.32 sq mi (11.19 km^{2})
  - Water: 0.0039 sq mi (0.01 km^{2})
- Elevation: 617 ft (188 m)

Population (2020)
  - Total: 9,193
  - Density: 2,128.3/sq mi (821.73/km^{2})
- Time zone: UTC-6 (Central (CST))
  - Summer (DST): UTC-5 (CDT)
- FIPS code: 29-19270
- GNIS feature ID: 2394523
- Website: www.desperesmo.org

Des Peres (/dəˈpɛər/ də-PAIR) is a city in west St. Louis County, Missouri, United States. The population was 9,193 at the 2020 census.

== History ==
The first inhabitants of Des Peres were the Cahokia, the Kaskaskia, the Mitchigamea, the Moingona, and the Otoe peoples. As well as the Missouria, and Osage, and Tamaroa peoples.

The Osage Nation lived in the area around Des Peres. The Osage were members of the Dhegiha Sioux group of tribes. This group also included the Ponca tribe, Quapaw tribe, Kansas tribe, and Omaha tribe.

Des Peres is thought to be the oldest white settlement in Missouri, founded about December 3, 1700 by a group of Kaskaskia Native Americans and French who had left the camp of the confederated Illinois tribes on the Illinois River. The settlement was called Des Peres, French for "The Fathers," and meant to honor the French Jesuit missionaries who settled there. This settlement was at the mouth of River des Peres and it is thought the first settlers found this region unhealthful, so moved across the Mississippi River to a prairie about 25 miles from the mouth of the Kaskaskia River.

People of European descent began settling in Des Peres in the 1800s. By 1850, there were 75,000 people living in St. Louis. Des Peres was mainly settled by German immigrants and southerners from Virginia and the Carolinas who were drawn to the area by the farmland sold off by the United States government in 80-to-160-acre (32 to 65 ha) tracts.

Des Peres got its name from the River des Peres whose tributaries, Deer Creek and Two Mile Creek, ran through the town.

In 1834 a small church, the Des Peres Presbyterian Church, 38°37′22″N 90°25′12″W (Old Des Peres Church;Old Stone Church) is a historic church on Geyer Road in Frontenac, Missouri. The church was added to the National Register of Historic Places in 1978.

Mark Becker has been mayor of the city since 2018.

== Geography ==
According to the United States Census Bureau, the city has a total area of 4.32 square miles (11.19 km^{2}), all land.

== Demographics ==
Historical population
| Census | Pop. | Note | %± |
|---|---|---|---|
| 1940 | 641 | | — |
| 1950 | 1,172 | | 82.8% |
| 1960 | 4,362 | | 272.2% |
| 1970 | 5,333 | | 22.3% |
| 1980 | 7,953 | | 49.1% |
| 1990 | 8,395 | | 5.6% |
| 2000 | 8,592 | | 2.3% |
| 2010 | 8,373 | | −2.5% |
| 2020 | 9,193 | | 9.8% |
U.S. Decennial Census

=== Racial and ethnic composition ===
Des Peres city, Missouri – Racial and ethnic composition Note: the US Census treats Hispanic/Latino as an ethnic category. This table excludes Latinos from the racial categories and assigns them to a separate category. Hispanics/Latinos may be of any race.
| Race / Ethnicity (NH = Non-Hispanic) | Pop 2000 | Pop 2010 | Pop 2020 | % 2000 | % 2010 | % 2020 |
|---|---|---|---|---|---|---|
| White alone (NH) | 8,244 | 7,809 | 8,205 | 95.95% | 93.26% | 89.25% |
| Black or African American alone (NH) | 68 | 76 | 109 | 0.79% | 0.91% | 1.19% |
| Native American or Alaska Native alone (NH) | 13 | 12 | 2 | 0.15% | 0.14% | 0.02% |
| Asian alone (NH) | 157 | 261 | 293 | 1.83% | 3.12% | 3.19% |
| Native Hawaiian or Pacific Islander alone (NH) | 2 | 2 | 5 | 0.02% | 0.02% | 0.05% |
| Other race alone (NH) | 1 | 7 | 22 | 0.01% | 0.08% | 0.24% |
| Mixed race or Multiracial (NH) | 36 | 94 | 337 | 0.42% | 1.12% | 3.67% |
| Hispanic or Latino (any race) | 71 | 112 | 220 | 0.83% | 1.34% | 2.39% |
| Total | 8,592 | 8,373 | 9,193 | 100.00% | 100.00% | 100.00% |

=== 2020 census ===
As of the 2020 census, Des Peres had a population of 9,193. The median age was 44.6 years. 25.5% of residents were under the age of 18 and 23.3% of residents were 65 years of age or older. For every 100 females there were 95.3 males, and for every 100 females age 18 and over there were 92.7 males age 18 and over.

100.0% of residents lived in urban areas, while 0.0% lived in rural areas.

There were 3,206 households in Des Peres, of which 35.9% had children under the age of 18 living in them. Of all households, 72.6% were married-couple households, 9.0% were households with a male householder and no spouse or partner present, and 16.3% were households with a female householder and no spouse or partner present. About 16.3% of all households were made up of individuals and 10.4% had someone living alone who was 65 years of age or older. The average household size was 2.8 and the average family size was 3.0.

There were 3,298 housing units, of which 2.8% were vacant. The homeowner vacancy rate was 1.0% and the rental vacancy rate was 6.7%.

=== Income and poverty ===
The 2016–2020 5-year American Community Survey estimates show that the median household income was $173,672 (with a margin of error of +/- $37,228) and the median family income was $190,972 (+/- $37,632). Males had a median income of $114,940 (+/- $24,644) versus $50,861 (+/- $15,075) for females. The median income for those above 16 years old was $80,827 (+/- $10,096). Approximately, 0.7% of families and 1.9% of the population were below the poverty line, including 1.4% of those under the age of 18 and 1.3% of those ages 65 or over.

=== 2010 census ===
As of the census of 2010, there were 8,373 people, 3,051 households, and 2,474 families residing in the city. The population density was 1,938.2 inhabitants per square mile (748.3/km^{2}). There were 3,155 housing units at an average density of 730.3 per square mile (282.0/km^{2}). The racial makeup of the city was 94.3% White, 0.9% African American, 0.2% Native American, 3.1% Asian, 0.3% from other races, and 1.2% from two or more races. Hispanic or Latino of any race were 1.3% of the population.

There were 3,051 households, of which 35.3% had children under the age of 18 living with them, 72.6% were married couples living together, 6.2% had a female householder with no husband present, 2.3% had a male householder with no wife present, and 18.9% were non-families. 16.4% of all households were made up of individuals, and 7.8% had someone living alone who was 65 years of age or older. The average household size was 2.72 and the average family size was 3.06.

The median age in the city was 45.9 years. 26.2% of residents were under the age of 18; 5% were between the ages of 18 and 24; 17.7% were from 25 to 44; 34% were from 45 to 64; and 17.2% were 65 years of age or older. The gender makeup of the city was 48.5% male and 51.5% female.

=== 2000 census ===
As of the census of 2000, there were 8,592 people, 3,004 households, and 2,532 families residing in the city. The population density was 1,954.3 inhabitants per square mile (754.6/km^{2}). There were 3,071 housing units at an average density of 698.5 per square mile (269.7/km^{2}). The racial makeup of the city was 96.55% White, 0.79% African American, 0.19% Native American, 1.83% Asian, 0.03% Pacific Islander, 0.15% from other races, and 0.45% from two or more races. Hispanic or Latino of any race were 0.83% of the population.

There were 3,004 households, out of which 39.2% had children under the age of 18 living with them, 76.2% were married couples living together, 6.1% had a female householder with no husband present, and 15.7% were non-families. 13.5% of all households were made up of individuals, and 7.3% had someone living alone who was 65 years of age or older. The average household size was 2.83 and the average family size was 3.12.

In the city the population was spread out, with 27.7% under the age of 18, 5.3% from 18 to 24, 21.5% from 25 to 44, 30.1% from 45 to 64, and 15.4% who were 65 years of age or older. The median age was 42 years. For every 100 females, there were 94.1 males. For every 100 females age 18 and over, there were 91.6 males.

The median income for a household in the city was $96,433, and the median income for a family was $106,195. Males had a median income of $79,465 versus $40,563 for females. The per capita income for the city was $40,916. About 0.8% of families and 1.5% of the population were below the poverty line, including 1.5% of those under age 18 and 0.4% of those age 65 or over.

== Government ==
The current head of the Des Peres government is Mayor Mark Becker. The government includes the following elected officials: Alderman Jimmy Osherow and Jennifer Weller - Ward 1, Alderman Jim Kleinschmidt and Dean Fitzpatrick - Ward 2, Alderman Patrick Barrett and Sean Concagh - Ward 3. The City also operates under the Mayor/Council/Administrator form of government, and has since 1973. Under this model the City Administrator serves as the Chief Administrative Officer and is responsible for overseeing the day-to-day operations of the city, which may include dealing with financial, legislative, legal, or personnel matters as they arise.

=== Schools ===
The public schools serving Des Peres are Parkway School District and Kirkwood R-7 School District. Two private schools exist both with religious affiliations. St. Clement of Rome School is run by its adjoining church and parish under the direction of the Roman Catholic Archdiocese of St. Louis. It houses students from pre-kindergarten to eighth grade. St. Paul's Lutheran School also houses students from pre-kindergarten to eighth grade and is affiliated with the Lutheran Church–Missouri Synod.

== Economy ==
The international headquarters of Edward Jones Investments is located in Des Peres.

West County Center, a shopping mall, was established here in 1969.

The international headquarters of Redbird Engineering is located in Des Peres.

=== Taxes ===
The City of Des Peres does not assess a real or personal property tax and has not since 1995: 67% School District; 13% Special Schools; 7% St. Louis County; 4% Community College; 4% Zoo/Museum District; 2% County Library; 2% MSD; 1% Sheltered Workshops.

== Culture ==
=== Parks and recreation ===
Des Peres maintains six separate parks: Des Peres Park, Harwood Park, Pioneer Park, Sugar Creek Park, as well as the 13 acre Phantom Forest and the 10 acre Bittersweet Woods conservation areas. Both designated "urban wildlife areas" are administered in cooperation with the Missouri Department of Conservation and run adjacent to Dougherty Lake, one of the original residential developments in Des Peres. The sites and trails for both sites are accessible to the public only via Barrett Station Road entrance. Bittersweet Woods was donated by Des Peres residents Jean and Joan Goodson. Phantom Forest was donated by Des Peres residents Claire and Ray Moore after Ray Moore's death. It is named after the Phantom comic strip, of which Ray Moore was the co-creator (with Lee Falk) and original illustrator.

The Lodge is a community center that includes indoor and outdoor aquatic facilities, fitness center, gymnasium, and meeting rooms.

=== Jar of Pickles ===
On Interstate 270 outside of Des Peres, near the West County Center, is a jar of pickles on a highway guardrail. Whenever the jar is damaged or goes missing, it is replaced by the locals. The jar appeared circa 2012, and has been replaced many times since. There is a group on Facebook dedicated to the jar known as "Team Pickle".
