= The Jungle Twins =

The Jungle Twins is a 1972-1975 American comic book series published by Gold Key Comics about two jungle men. The series was one of several new titles Gold Key created when it lost the rights to the Tarzan characters by Edgar Rice Burroughs.

== Publication history ==
The series was created by writer Gaylord Du Bois and artist Paul Norris. The comic lasted 17 issues, from 1972 to 1975. In 1982, "Whitman Comics" reprinted issue #1 as #18.

== Fictional character biographies ==
The Jungle Twins are twins Tono and Kono. Of European birth, they were raised by an African chief, and traveled through Africa, having adventures. It was later revealed they were of royal descent, their parents being the rulers of Glockenberg, a fictional kingdom in Europe.
