= Cloak and Dagger (radio series) =

US radio adventure series (1950)

Cloak and Dagger is an NBC radio series, a foreign intrigue adventure adapted from the book Cloak and Dagger by Corey Ford and Alistair McBain. Ford also was host of the series. Cloak and Dagger was broadcast from May 7 to October 22, 1950, as part of "a mystery block with several other shows of far inferior quality". The program was sustaining for all 22 episodes.

== Personnel ==
The cast that included Raymond Edward Johnson, Everett Sloane and Jackson Beck. Robert Warren and Karl Weber were the announcers. Scriptwriter Wyllis Cooper directed the series with research support provided by Percy Hoskins, British journalist, crime reporter and author. The producers were Alfred Hollander and Louis G. Cowan, with Sherman Marks as director. Jack Gordon and Winifred Wolfe were the writers, and John Gart provided music.

== Episodes ==
Stories on Cloak and Dagger "came right out of Washington files" of the Office of Strategic Services. A 1950 newspaper article commented, "The stories dramatized each week are true, and yet as fantastic as any fiction writer might be able to dream up." The program was the first network series based on fully authenticated case histories of OSS espionage.
