= West County Center =

Shopping mall in Des Peres, Missouri, St. Louis

Coordinates: 38.60265°N 90.4474°W

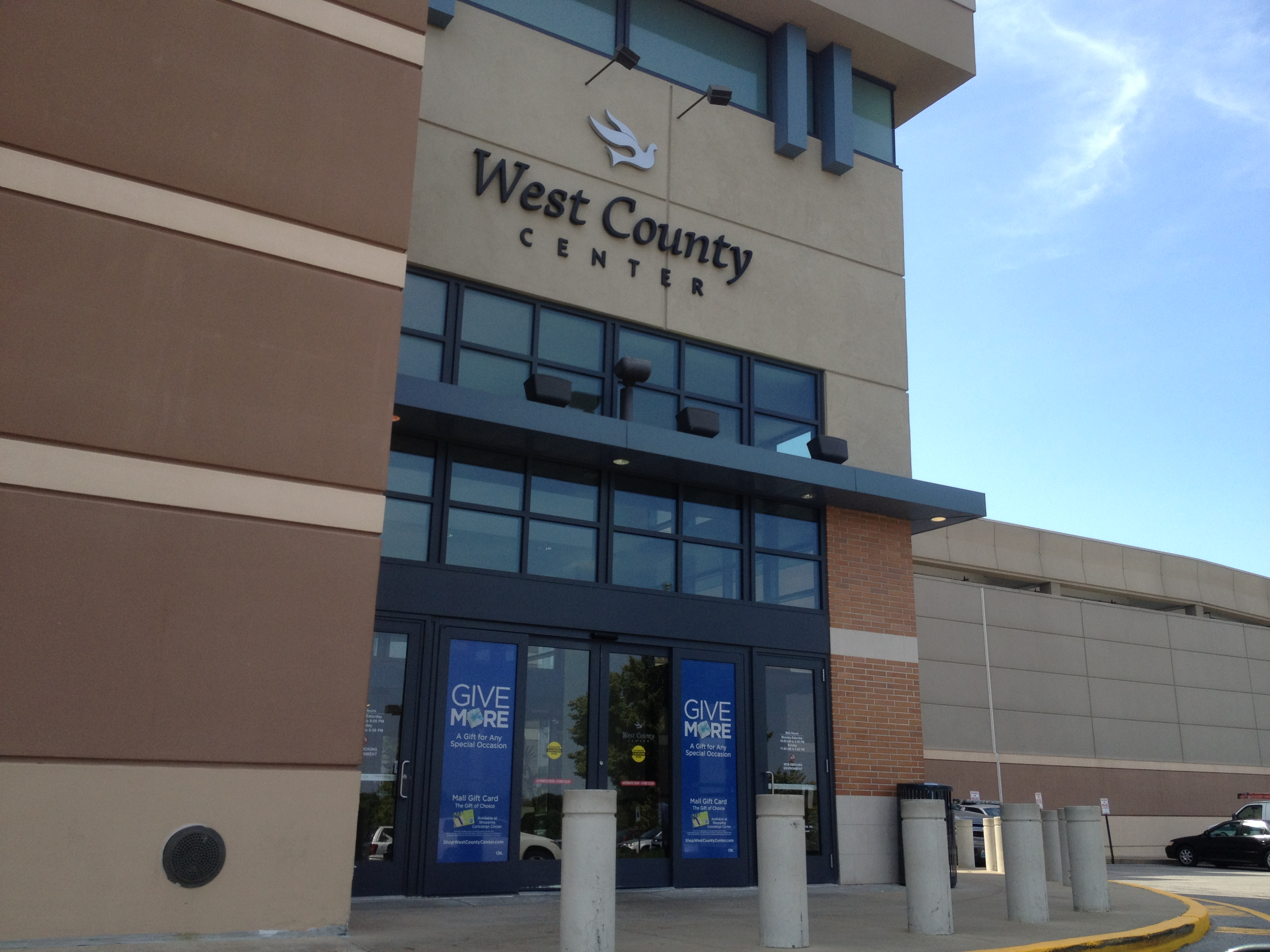
- West County Center entrance in 2012
- Location: Des Peres, Missouri, United States
- Address: 80 West County Center
- Opened: 1969 (original mall) 2002 (current mall)
- Closed: 2001 (original mall)
- Developer: CenterMark Properties
- Manager: CBL Properties
- Owner: CBL Properties and TIAA-CREF
- Num. of stores: 150+
- Num. of anchor tenants: 4
- Floor area: 1,209,649 sq ft (112,380.1 m^{2})
- Floors: 2 in the main mall area, 3 in Macy's. Dick's occupies a dedicated 3rd and 4th floor.
- Public transit: MetroBus
- Website: www.shopwestcountycenter.com

West County Center is a shopping mall located in Des Peres, Missouri, a suburb of St. Louis. The original mall was built in 1969. The original mall closed in 2001, and a new mall on the site opened in 2002. The anchor stores are Macy's, Nordstrom, Dick's Sporting Goods, and JCPenney.

== History ==
=== 1969 mall ===
The original West County Center mall was constructed by May Co.'s CenterMark Properties real estate development division, and opened on February 20, 1969, at the southeast corner of I-270 and Manchester Road (Route 100) in Des Peres, Missouri. It was built on the site of the Manchester Drive-In movie theater, which many remember for the Easter sunrise services that were held there. It was 563,621 square feet (52,362.1 m^{2}) and was anchored by Famous-Barr and JCPenney. The mall was sold to the Australian Westfield Group in 1994 and was renamed Westfield Shoppingtown West County.

In 1997, Nordstrom announced their intention to open a new anchor store at the mall, as part of a complete reconstruction of the center by Westfield. The original mall closed on January 27, 2001, and was demolished, except for the JCPenney anchor store structure, which was remodeled.

=== 2002 mall ===
The new 1,138,813 square feet (105,799.2 m^{2}) Westfield Shoppingtown West County opened on September 20, 2002. The US$230 million project added a 2-story Nordstrom, a Lord & Taylor, a food court, and three parking garages. It also included a 2-story Galyan's Trading Company above the café court. In 2004 Galyan's was acquired by Dick's Sporting Goods. In October 2007, CBL & Associates acquired four out of five malls in the St. Louis area owned by Westfield.

In 2009, the mall's vacant Lord & Taylor was adapted into a new wing housing Barnes & Noble, which relocated from an older location nearby, and other retailers. The mall had one of the region's two Apple Stores and the region’s only Lego Store.

In September 2012, it was announced that TIAA-CREF would receive 50% ownership of West County Center and several other CBL malls in an attempt to reduce CBL's debt.

== Dove sign ==
The most famous part of the mall is the large dove sign that sits outside the mall next to Interstate 270. Created by Tony Amato, it has become a meeting place for thousands of people during its nearly 50-year life. The removal of the dove in early 2001 caused minor controversy among nearby churches. The dove was refurbished during the renovation, and in mid-2002, returned to its original perch. Today, it is in the parking lot outside of Nordstrom.
