= David Neil McKay =

David Neil McKay (August 31, 1929 – November 18, 2010) was an American librarian and government administrator. While he held many positions, he is most known for his position as the North Carolina State Librarian from 1976 to 1985. He was advocate for library funding, and during his leadership took steps to develop library cooperation by developing statewide and regional library networks.

== Early life ==
McKay was born on August 31, 1929, in San Diego, California, to Florence Lois Marcks McKay and Philip Leonard McKay. He graduated from San Diego State University in 1953, where he was captain of the basketball team. Following graduation, he served for two years in the U.S. Marines from 1953 to 1955, before returning to graduate school. He earned a Master's in Library Science from the University of Southern California in 1957.

== Professional career ==
=== Early career ===
In 1957, McKay worked as the district librarian for the Palos Verdes Library District in Palos Verdes Peninsula, California, where he stayed until 1962. From 1963 to 1966, he worked as a director of the Binational Center in Brazil, where he helped to strengthen Brazilian-American cultural relations. In 1966, he took a position as a cultural affairs officer with the United States Information Agency in Brazil, where he remained until 1969. During his time in Brazil, he also taught library science in Brazilian universities. From 1969 until 1973, he worked as a director for the Metropolitan Library Service Agency, to establish better cooperation between libraries in the Minneapolis-St. Paul area. He also taught courses at the Minnesota Graduate School of Library Science. He briefly worked at Richard Abel Co. Inc., as a general manager in 1974.

=== North Carolina State Librarian ===
McKay was named the North Carolina State Librarian in 1976, following the death of Philip S. Ogilvie, the former State Librarian. During McKay's tenure, he played a crucial role in shaping library funding policy, most notably securing the "Three Million Dollar Push" in the 1983–1984 state budget. He also spearheaded long-term library development planning, with his Five Year Plans. These plans guided future policy and funding decisions. He also led efforts to revise the state depository laws, which would create a centralized depository for all state publications.

A strong advocate for federal library funding, McKay was particularly vocal in his support for the Library Services and Construction Act (LSCA). He testified before the U.S. House Subcommittee on Postsecondary Education in 1982, opposing proposed cuts to LSCA funding and highlighting its significance for North Carolina's library infrastructure, including statewide networks and programs such as the Union Catalog and summer reading initiatives. McKay's leadership in securing and expanding library services earned national recognition, and his efforts in advocating for equitable access to library resources were instrumental in shaping the state's library system during the 1970s and 1980s.

== Personal life ==
=== Family ===
McKay was married to Elizabeth Eagles of Saskatoon, Saskatchewan. His second marriage was to Alberta Sprott McKay, with whom he was married to for 30 years. He had two children, Jeanne Elizabeth McKay and Neil Fraser Riedel, as well as three step children, Lida Witherspoon, Jeannette Smith, and Fred Smith III.

=== Awards and recognition ===
In 1976, he was recognized by the News and Observer as the “Tarheel of the Week.” He also received the Order of the Long Leaf Pine in December 1984, an award presented to individuals who provide extraordinary service to the state. As well as being a star basketball player in college, he was also noted as being an outstanding tennis player.

=== Death ===
McKay died on November 18, 2010, after a short, acute illness. His cremated remains were incorporated into the EcoEternity Forest, where cremated remains are placed in a biodegradable capsule in the roots of a tree, with an engraved plaque bearing the individual's name.
