= Clarence Gray =

American comic strip artist

Clarence Gray

Clarence Gray (November 14, 1901 – January 5, 1957) was an American comic strip artist, best known for drawing the science fiction adventure strip Brick Bradford for more than two decades. He also worked as a freelance illustrator for various magazines.

== Editorial cartoons ==
Born in Toledo, Ohio, Gray called himself the "middle man" of three brothers. He was the son of Laura Jane and Val Gray, a construction worker. His father took little interest in his childhood drawings. "He just pitied me," recalled Gray. The red-haired youth began drawing trains and automobiles at an early age, teaching himself by making copies of magazine illustrations. He once described himself as a "red-headed, freckle-faced little punk." He concentrated on art courses in grade and high school, and after his high school graduation, he started his career at $18 a week doing sports and editorial cartoonist with the Toledo News-Bee. However, on his second week, he was surprised by a large raise, as detailed in a 1936 syndicated feature story on cartoonists:

Before he was out of his teens, Gray was working in the art department of Toledo newspaper... Then one Saturday the salary inexplicably jumped to $40. The boy sensed an error and sought the cashier. But that office was closed. During the weekend, Gray convinced himself his employer had recognized genius and rewarded it handsomely. But Blue Monday came. There had been a mistake. He wasn't due for even a 20 cent raise. Fury possessed the young artist. Forty dollars a week became his goal. He long ago surpassed it, of course; but recognition was considerably hastened by that early disappointment.

"I had to give it back the next Monday," recalled Gray. "It was a payroll mistake."

== Comic strips ==
In 1933, he created Brick Bradford with writer William H. Ritt, a columnist with the Central Press Association of Cleveland. Launched by the Central Press Association as an adventure strip, it quickly developed into one of the leading science-fiction strips of the 1930s. The daily comic strip was joined by a Sunday page in 1934, followed by a companion strip, The Time Top in 1935.

In 1939, Gray gave his art tips:

All you need to do is observe the objects about you. Notice the wrinkles in clothing, the shadows and highlights of objects. Then attempt to reproduce them on paper as faithfully as you can. At first, your drawings won't resemble what they are supposed to—but keep at it. Soon you'll notice an improvement which is bound to become more rapid as time goes on. Remember two things: (1) Never be perfectly satisfied with a drawing. (2) More important, never become discouraged.

Gray received the solo byline for the daily strip in 1948 and the Sunday strip in 1949. When Ritt stopped scripting in 1952, Gray worked only on the Sunday strip and left the daily strip to Paul Norris. Gray and his wife, Jessie Matthews Gray, lived in Rocky River, Ohio where they had one son, Robert, and red-haired twins, Janet and Jane. When not at the drawing board, Gray liked golf, hunting, fishing and camping, where he communed with nature:

Campfire smoke sends me. I like pine trees in the north country, and the older my hunting coat gets, the better it smells. I like storms—blizzards in the winter and black squalls in the summer. Rain on a tent-top thrills me. I always think there is a big bass under every lily pad on a cool, green lake. I like the click of a good golf shot too, because it means a long walk in the open. After that, a session in the locker room is good, with blue chips and a tall glass. The greatest art to me is living. What I put on paper is mostly a means of being able to get out and see more of the real thing.

Clarence Gray died in 1957 at age 55. At age 70, William Ritt died September 20, 1972.
