= King Comics =

Comics

- Parent company: King Features
- Founded: 1966
- Defunct: 1967
- Country of origin: United States
- Headquarters location: New York City
- Key people: Bill Harris
- Publication types: Comic books
- Fiction genres: Action, Adventure, Humor
- Imprints: King Paks

King Comics, a short-lived comic book imprint of King Features Syndicate, was an attempt by King Features to publish comics of its own characters, rather than through other publishers. A few King Comics titles were picked up from Gold Key Comics. King Features placed former Gold Key editor Bill Harris in charge of the line.

The line was published from August 1966 to December 1967. The King Comics Flash Gordon title was well-received, winning three Alley Awards in 1966 and another in 1967. The series had distribution problems throughout its run. Several distributors refused to take the King Comics because their first issues lacked a Comics Code Authority seal; King subsequently obtained a CCA seal, used on all later issues. King Features tried to overcome the distribution problem by selling its titles in special "King Paks" of three to variety stores and supermarkets. This tactic failed to gain more readers, and the King Comics line was discontinued.

Many stories created for King Comics were later published in the continuation of most of King's titles by Charlton Comics.

== Titles ==
- Beetle Bailey #54–65 (Aug. 1966–Dec. 1967), continued from Gold Key, continued by Charlton with #67 (#66 sold overseas only by King)
- Blondie Comics #164–175 (Aug. 1966–Dec. 1967), continued from Harvey Comics, continued by Charlton with #177 (no #176 was published)
- Flash Gordon #1–11 (Sept. 1966–Dec. 1967), continued by Charlton
- Jungle Jim #5 (Dec. 67), reprinted Dell Comics' issue #5, continued by Charlton using Dell's numbering
- Mandrake the Magician #1–10 (Sept. 1966–Nov. 1967)
- The Phantom #18–28 (Sept. 1966–Dec. 1967), continued from Gold Key, continued by Charlton
- Popeye #81–92 (Sept. 1966–Nov. 1967), continued from Gold Key, continued by Charlton

== See also ==
- Ace Comics
- Disney comics
- The Sunday Funnies
