= A. D. David Mackay =

American businessman

A. D. David Mackay became the chief executive officer and president of Kellogg Company on December 31, 2006, and retired in January 2011. He was previously the president and chief operating officer since September 2003 prior to his promotion. His career at Kellogg began when he joined Kellogg Australia in 1985, and he went on to serve in various positions in Kellogg USA, Kellogg Australia and Kellogg New Zealand until his departure in 1992. In 1998, he rejoined Kellogg Australia and became the managing director of Kellogg United Kingdom and Ireland within the same year. Since then, he has held various positions within the company, including senior vice president, president, executive vice president, president, and chief operating officer. In addition to his executive positions, he is also a director of Kellogg and Fortune Brands, Inc.

== Compensation ==
While CEO of Kellogg in 2008, A. D. David Mackay earned a total compensation of $10,031,079, which included a base salary of $1,136,545, a cash bonus of $2,601,300, stocks granted of $1,803,547, options granted of $3,114,474 and other compensation of $1,375,213.
