= Mandrake the Magician =

Comic strip created by Lee Falk

- 1938 Mandrake comic
- Author: Lee Falk (1934–1999); Fred Fredericks (1999–2013)
- Illustrator(s): Phil Davis (c. 1934–1964); Fred Fredericks (1964–2013)
- Current status/schedule: Daily and Sunday; concluded; reruns
- Launch date: June 11, 1934
- End date: July 6, 2013
- Syndicate: King Features Syndicate
- Publisher: King Comics
- Genre: Adventure

Mandrake the Magician

Publication information
- Publisher: King Comics
- First appearance: June 11, 1934
- Created by: Lee Falk

In-story information
- Team affiliations: Defenders of the Earth
- Abilities: Master magician Extended lifespan Genius-level intellect

Mandrake the Magician is a syndicated newspaper comic strip, created by Lee Falk before he created The Phantom. Mandrake began publication on June 11, 1934. Phil Davis soon took over as the strip's illustrator, while Falk continued to script. The strip was distributed by King Features Syndicate.

Mandrake, along with the Phantom Magician in Mel Graff's The Adventures of Patsy, is regarded as the first superhero of comics by comics historians such as Don Markstein, who wrote, "Some people say Mandrake the Magician, who started in 1934, was comics' first superhero."

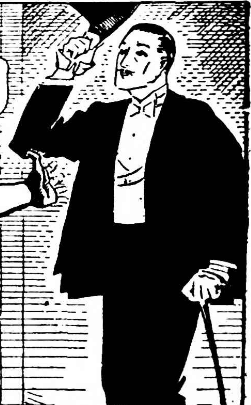
Mandrake The Magician as seen in his debut from a June 15th 1934 comic strip.

Davis worked on the strip until his death in 1964, when Falk recruited artist Fred Fredericks. With Falk's death in 1999, Fredericks became both writer and artist. The Sunday-newspaper Mandrake strip ended December 29, 2002. The daily newspaper strip ended mid-story on July 6, 2013, when Fred Fredericks retired, and a reprint of Pursuit of the Cobra (D220) from 1995 began July 8, 2013.

== Characters and story ==
Mandrake is a magician whose work is based on an unusually fast hypnotic technique. As noted in captions, when Mandrake "gestures hypnotically", his subjects see illusions, and Mandrake has used this technique against a variety of villains including gangsters, mad scientists, extraterrestrials, and characters from other dimensions. At various times in the comic strip, Mandrake also demonstrates other powers, including becoming invisible, shapeshifting, levitation, and teleporting. Although Mandrake publicly works as a stage magician, he spends much of his time fighting criminals and combatting supernatural entities. Mandrake lives in Xanadu, a high-tech mansion atop a mountain in New York State. Xanadu's features include closed-circuit TV, a sectional road which divides in half, and vertical iron gates.

=== Leon Mandrake ===
Leon Mandrake, a real-life magician, had been performing for well over ten years before Lee Falk introduced the comic strip character. Thus, he is sometimes thought to have been the source for the origin of the strip, however Leon didn't appear on stage by the name of Mandrake until 1943. Leon Mandrake, like the fictional Mandrake, was also known for his top hat, pencil-line mustache, and scarlet-lined cape. Ironically, Leon Mandrake had changed his stage name to Mandrake to match the popular strip and then legally changed his surname from Giglio to Mandrake later. The resemblance between the comic-strip hero and the real-life magician was close enough to allow Leon to at least passively allow the illusion that the strip was based on his stage persona. Leon Mandrake was accompanied by Narda, his first wife and stage assistant, named after a similar character, who appears in the strip. Velvet, his replacement assistant and eventual lifetime partner, would also later make appearances in the strip along with his real-life side-kick, Lothar.

== Other characters ==
=== Supporting ===
Lothar is Mandrake's best friend and crimefighting companion, who Mandrake first met during his travels in Africa. Lothar was the Prince of the Seven Nations, a mighty federation of jungle tribes but forbore becoming king to follow Mandrake on his world travels. Lothar is often referred to as "the strongest man in the world". One of the first African crimefighting heroes ever to appear in comics, Lothar's début alongside Mandrake was in the 1934 inaugural daily strip. In the beginning, Lothar spoke poor English and wore a fez, short pants, and a leopard skin. In a 1935 work by King Features Syndicate, Lothar is referred to as Mandrake's "giant black slave." When artist Fred Fredericks took over in 1965, Lothar spoke correct English and his clothing changed, although he often wore shirts with leopard-skin patterns.

Narda is Princess of the European nation Cockaigne, ruled by her brother Segrid. She made her first appearance in the second Mandrake story. Even though she and Mandrake were initially infatuated with each other, they did not marry until 1997, when they held an extravagant triple wedding ceremony at Mandrake's home of Xanadu, Narda's home country Cockaigne, and Mandrake's father Theron's College of Magic (Collegium Magikos) in the Himalayas. Narda learned martial arts from Hojo.

Theron is the headmaster of the College of Magic (Collegium Magikos) located in the Himalayas. He is hundreds of years old and may be kept alive by the Mind Crystal, of which he is the guardian.

Hojo, who knows six languages, is Mandrake's chef at his home of Xanadu and the secret chief of the international crimefighting organization Inter-Intel. As such, he has enlisted Mandrake's help with many cases. He is also a superb martial-arts expert. Hojo's assistant at Inter-Intel is Jed.

The Police Chief is named Bradley but mostly called Chief. Mandrake aided him on several occasions. The Chief created the S.S.D. (Silly Stuff Dept.) for absurd and unbelievable cases that only Mandrake could solve. He has a son, Chris.

Magnon, the emperor of the galaxy, is Mandrake's most powerful friend and, with his wife Carola, has a daughter, Nardraka. She was named after Mandrake and Narda and is their godchild.

Lenore is Mandrake's younger half-sister. She is a world-renowned explorer.

Karma is Lothar's girlfriend, an African princess who works as a model.

=== Villains ===
The Cobra is Mandrake's most evil and dangerous foe, apparent from the start of the story. In 1937, the Cobra seemed to be defeated, but returned in 1965, wearing a menacing silver mask. The Cobra's main goal is to acquire one of the two powerful Crystal Cubes, which increase mental energy. Mandrake and his father Theron guard them. Mandrake learned that The Cobra was secretly Luciphor, Theron's oldest son and, thus, Mandrake's half-brother. In later years, the Cobra was able to abandon his silver mask because his face had been reconstructed through surgery. He is sometimes accompanied by his assistant Ud, later revealed to be Octon, the leader of the 8.

Derek is Mandrake's twin brother and, thus, similar to Mandrake in appearance. He used his magical powers, which were nearly the same as Mandrake's, to achieve short-term personal satisfaction. Mandrake tried to remove Derek's knowledge of magic but never entirely succeeded. Derek's son Eric, with an unknown mother, shows no signs of following in his father's footsteps.

The Clay Camel, real name Saki, is a master of disguise, able to mimic anyone and change his appearance in seconds. His name comes from the symbol he leaves at the scenes of his crimes, a small camel made of clay.

The Brass Monkey, daughter of the Clay Camel, has a similar talent for disguises.

Aleena the Enchantress is a former friend of Mandrake's from the College of Magic and a much-married spoiled temptress who uses her magic powers to benefit herself. She sometimes attempts to seduce Mandrake, but fails and, afterward, attempts to cause him trouble.

8 is an old and very powerful crime organization originating in medieval times. Members are known to often incorporate the number 8 in their crimes or leave the number 8 as a mark. They are organized like an octopus with eight arms, as in its headquarters, which are spread all over the world. One head — the mysterious leader Octon — is only shown as a menacing image on a computer screen. Over the years, Mandrake destroys the various headquarters one by one. In one episode, the Octon of 8 is revealed as Cobra, but the name later refers to an artificial intelligence wielded by Ming the Merciless in the television series Defenders of the Earth.

Ekardnam, Mandrake spelled backward, is Mandrake's "evil twin", who exists on the other side of a mirror. Like his world, in which the government is run by the Private of the Armies and generals do menial tasks, Ekardnam is an exact opposite and uses his "evil eye" to work his magic.

The Deleter is an extraterrestrial contract killer who will "delete" anyone for a price but will inflict justice on anyone who tries to cheat him out of his contract fee.

Nitro Cain is a mad bomber who throws sticks of explosives at people, including Mandrake. After the Mandrake comic strip appeared in the Australian newspaper Sunday Telegraph, the series was later abruptly withdrawn with the last panel showing that Nitro Cain had blown Mandrake off a horse, with Mandrake exclaiming: "Blast you, Nitro Cain", a clever reference to the explosive's blast.

== The newspaper strip ==
Oddly, newspapers did not carry any Mandrake daily strips with dates between June 26 and June 30, 1940. Instead, they carried strips dated one week later. The following week, to catch up, newspapers ran a week of undated strips. Some newspapers even scratched out the date printed on the strip and by hand wrote in the correct date.

== Comic books ==
Mandrake had a prominent role in Magic Comics, a compilation of newspaper comic strip reprints published by David McKay Company from 1939 to 1949. Mandrake was the cover star for issues nos. 8 through 24. Beginning with issue no. 25, an illustration of Mandrake became part of the magazine's logo.

Dell Comics published a Mandrake the Magician issue in its Four Color comic book series with various main characters. The Mandrake issue, no. 752, featured original stories by Stan Campell and written by Paul Newman.

In 1966–67, King Comics published ten issues of a Mandrake the Magician comic book. Most of the stories were remakes of past newspaper strip stories and featured art by André LeBlanc, Ray Bailey and others. Mandrake stories also ran as backup features in other King titles.

Italian publisher Fratelli Spada produced a considerable amount of original Mandrake comic-book stories in the 1960s and 1970s. A few were also published in the American Mandrake comic book mentioned above.

Marvel released a Mandrake mini-series in 1995, written by Mike W. Barr with painted art by Rob Ortaleza. However, only two of three planned issues were published.

Mandrake has also enjoyed great success in comic books published in Britain, Australia, Brazil, India, France, Spain, Italy, Yugoslavia, Germany, Norway, Denmark, Finland, Turkey, and Sweden. Although, in the Nordic countries, it was most often a backup feature in The Phantom comic books. As well, Mandrake is popular in India through Indrajal Comics.

Mandrake is featured together with the Phantom in The Phantom Annual #2, written by Mike Bullock and Kevin Grevioux and published by Moonstone Books.

In 2013, Dynamite Entertainment launched a mini-series, Kings Watch, in which, much like Defenders of the Earth, Mandrake and Lothar teamed up with the Phantom, Flash Gordon, Dale Arden, and Hans Zarkov. The series pitted the six characters against the Cobra and Ming the Merciless. This was followed by a Mandrake solo comic, written by Roger Langridge and drawn by Jeremy Treece, as part of Dynamite's King: Dynamite series. Meanwhile, Lothar was the protagonist of the King run's Phantom miniseries, in which he took over the mantle of the Ghost Who Walks while searching for the late Phantom's successor.

In July 2020, King Features Syndicate, Red 5 Comics, and StoneBot Studios announced the series Legacy of Mandrake the Magician, written by Erica Schultz and drawn by Diego Giribaldi, Juan Pablo Massa, and Moncho Bunge. The series tells the story of teenage magic apprentice Mandragora Constanza Terrado Paz, known more simply as "Mandy" Paz. Mandy's mother is a fortune teller and they live in a building owned by Mandrake the Magician, whom Mandy's mother knows personally. Mandy's best friend is LJ, the teenage son of Lothar. While investigating Mandrake's storage room, Mandy discovers a magic mirror containing the spirit of a magician called Alruin, who then begins the girl's training in magic.

In 2024, Mad Cave Studios published a new Flash Gordon comic book, a trade paperback of Marvel's Defenders of the Earth series and launched a new series of the team.

== Books ==
There were also four Mandrake the Magician (Big Little Books) published by Whitman Publishing:

- Mandrake the Magician (1935)
- Mandrake the Magician and the Midnight Monster (1939)
- Mandrake the Magician, Mighty Solver of Mysteries (1942)
- Mandrake the Magician and the Flame Pearls (1946)

== Reprints ==
- Inside Magic publishes current Mandrake daily comic strip from King Features.
- Dragon Lady Press reprinted a 1937 Mandrake daily story in Classic Adventure Strips #1.
- Pacific Comics Club reprinted two Mandrake daily stories from 1938 Feature Books #18 and #23.
- Nostalgia Press published a hardback book reprinting two 1938 daily stories.
- Pioneer Comics reprinted a large number of Mandrake stories in comic book form.
- Comics Revue has reprinted several Mandrake daily and Sunday stories, including first Mandrake daily story and the first Mandrake Sunday story.
- JAL Publications has reprinted several Mandrake stories
- Hermes Press reprinted the King comic book series in two volumes in 2015-2016.
- Hermes Press is also reprinting the daily strips from the beginning in hardcover volumes, starting in 2024.
- Titan Books has reprinted the earliest Mandrake Sunday strips, as well as the earliest daily strips by Phil Davis and Fred Fredericks, respectively, in three separate volumes (all three, confusingly, labelled "Vol.1").

== In other media ==
=== Radio ===
Mandrake the Magician was a 15-minute radio serial, which aired on the Mutual Broadcasting System from November 11, 1940, until February 6, 1942.

Movie serial poster (1939)

=== Films ===
In 1939, Columbia produced a 12-part Mandrake the Magician serial, based on the King Features strip, starring Warren Hull as Mandrake and Native Hawaiian actor Al Kikume as Lothar. The serial is available on DVD.

An unauthorized Mandrake movie produced in Turkey was made in 1967, Mandrake Killing'in Peşinde, also known as Mandrake Killing'e Karşı / Mandrake Against Killing), directed by Oksal Pekmezoğlu and starring Güven Erte as Mandrake.

==== Unproduced films ====
In the 1960s, Federico Fellini, a close friend of Falk, intended to make a Mandrake movie, but the project was never realized.

In the early 1980s, within two weeks of signing with his first agent, American filmmaker Michael Almereyda was hired by Embassy Pictures to rewrite a script for Mandrake the Magician. He told Filmmaker magazine that, upon receiving the assignment, he flew to New York City and checked himself into the Chelsea Hotel to work on the rewrite. Three weeks later, he emerged with a new draft, but by then the studio had changed heads, and, in as little time as his revision took, the project was dropped.

In the mid-80s, rights to the character landed at Goldcrest Films with William Hjortsberg hired to write the screenplay which would've been set in the 1930s and called for elaborate illusions and a production budget ranging from $24-30 million. The film's story would have begun in Tibet at the college of magic covering Mandrake's origin story in being trained in magic. The story then would have shifted focus to Mandrake facing off against a villain with ties to the Illuminati and embarking on a globetrotting adventure to Rome, Paris, New York City, the SS Normandie, and then back to Tibet after a race across Afghanistan. Hjortsberg also planned to rework Mandrake's companion Lothar to change the racist nature of the character who had been described in the strips as Mandrake's "giant black slave" or "a big baboon". In the Hjortsberg script, Mandrake would have encountered Lothar working as a muscleman in a Paris nightclub only to discover he is under a trance. Mandrake would bring Lothar out of the trance and learn that Lothar is an intellectual is studying classic literature at Oxford and is fluent in several languages. Following the failure of Revolution which nearly forced Goldcrest into bankruptcy, attempts were made to partner with Warner Bros. on the film, but after failing to find a director Warner Bros. lost interest in the film.

In 2007, Baldwin Entertainment Group and Hyde Park Entertainment purchased rights to make a Mandrake movie to be directed by Mimi Leder. The two companies own the rights to Lee Falk's The Phantom. Jonathan Rhys Meyers was originally projected to play the title character with Chuck Russell as director. In 2009, Hayden Christensen replaced Rhys Meyers in the title role of the film with Djimon Hounsou co-starring and Mimi Leder directing. In June 2016, Sacha Baron Cohen was cast as Mandrake.

=== Television ===
==== Live-action ====
NBC made a pilot for a Mandrake the Magician TV series in 1954, but no other episodes were made. Stage magician Coe Norton starred as Mandrake and Woody Strode as Lothar.

Anthony Herrera had the title role in the TV film Mandrake with Ji-Tu Cumbuka as Lothar. Magician Harry Blackstone Jr. was featured in the cast.

==== Animation ====
Mandrake and Lothar first appeared in animated form with the Phantom, Flash Gordon, and Steve Canyon in 1972 television special The Man Who Hated Laughter.

In the animated series Defenders of the Earth (1986–87), Mandrake the Magician teams with fellow King Features adventurers Flash Gordon and The Phantom. Mandrake's best friend and crime-fighting partner Lothar also has a prominent role, as well as a teenage son nicknamed L.J. (Lothar Jr.) who is a martial artist. Mandrake has an adopted son of Asian blood named Kshin, whom he is training as his apprentice and heir. Peter Renaday provided the voice of Mandrake and Buster Jones provided Lothar's. The entire series has been released by BCI Eclipse as a two-DVD set in America, while Fremantle Media released the entire series on DVD in the UK. The series can be seen on the Pluto TV Classic Toons channel.

In animated series Phantom 2040, featuring a future Phantom, Mandrake appears in the episode "The Magician". He is not named in the episode but rather presented as an old friend of that Phantom's father, a magician who helped build much of previous Phantom's previous equipment. His remarkably well-preserved shape is compatible with the longevity-conferring properties of the Crystals. Peter Renaday once again provides the voice of Mandrake.

=== Theater ===
The musical Mandrake the Magician and the Enchantress was produced during the late 1970s at the Lenox Arts Festival in Massachusetts. The script is by Falk and Thayer Burch with music by George Quincy and lyrics by Burch.

Mandrake is a character in the play King Kong Palace, written by Chilean playwright Marco Antonio de la Parra. In the play, Mandrake is now a performer at birthday parties, in which he attempts to seduce Jane, the ambitious wife of Tarzan, in order to satisfy his lust for power.

== Parodies and tributes ==
Mandrake the Magician has inspired several other comic characters with magic powers, including Zatara, Kardak the Mystic Magician, Monako, Dakor the Magician, Ibis the Invincible, Mantor the Magician, Sargon the Sorcerer, Zatanna, Mr. Mystic, The Wizard, Mysto, Dr. Strange, and Magician Detective, as well as the short-lived Jim the Magician (Jadugar Jim in Hindi) by Sudhir Tailang in India.

In Mad no. 14 (August 1954), Mandrake was spoofed as "Manduck". He lives in a city dump, which he convinces visitors is a palatial home by "gesturing hypnotically". In this story, he matches wits with The Shadow; he, Lothar (called Loathar), and The Shadow all gesture hypnotically at each other, and, after a huge explosion, only Lothar (looking like Manduck) remains. In another issue, Manduck pulls off the trick of turning Loathar into a six-foot-tall (180 cm) blonde woman.

Peter S. Beagle has stated that the character Schmendrick the Magician, from his novel The Last Unicorn, was partly written as a parody of Mandrake the Magician.

Gianni Garko has stated that the new interpretation of his Sartana character in the 1968 Spaghetti Western film If You Meet Sartana Pray for Your Death presented by the film's director Gianfranco Parolini, of a gunfighter with seemingly supernatural luck, was influenced by Mandrake the Magician.

"In Pictopia" (first published in Anything Goes! no. 2 (August 1986) is a short story by Alan Moore and illustrator Don Simpson, which takes place in a limbo world of comic-book characters. Main character Nocturno the Necromancer is based on Mandrake. The story was reprinted in George Khoury's The Extraordinary Works of Alan Moore (TwoMorrows, July 2003).

Michael Kupperman's Tales Designed to Thrizzle (Fantagraphics) pokes fun at many comics, including Mandrake the Magician, with three-panel strip "Mancake the Magician".

In France, Mandrake was spoofed as Rasmus, Zembla's comic sidekick in Zembla (Augusto Pedrazza, 1963-1979).

In the episode 106 of the Argentine comic "Mi novia y yo", Mandrake makes a cameo at the end of the story.

== In popular culture ==
New Zealand-born Australian country and western singer Tex Morton had a successful song "Mandrake" recorded in 1941. It was about a rodeo horse named Mandrake who never bucked the same, explaining, "Mandrake is a wizard so that's how he got his name".

Professional baseball player Don Mueller, active in Major League Baseball from 1948 to 1959, was nicknamed "Mandrake the Magician" for being adept at consistently putting the ball in play and delivering hits through the infield.

In Italy, a popular saying non sono mica Mandrake ("I'm no Mandrake", meaning "I can't do what's impossible"), refers to the magician.

In Colombia, a popular saying sabrá Mandrake ("only Mandrake would know", meaning "only someone all-knowing / with mental powers would know"), also refers to the magician.
