= Phil Davis (cartoonist) =

American artist (1906–1964)

Phil Davis' Mandrake the Magician (June 25. 1944)

Philip Davis (March 4, 1906 – 16 December 1964) was an American artist who illustrated Mandrake the Magician, written by Lee Falk. Davis was born in St. Louis, Missouri.

Growing up with one sister and one brother, Davis became interested in drawing when he was six years old. "I had a mania for parades," he recalled. "I drew every parade I could see. My family neither encouraged nor discouraged me. They just accepted my dark fate."

While attending Washington University in St. Louis, Davis had a part-time job as a draftsman with the technical department of the local telephone company. By 1928, he was working in the art department of the St. Louis Post-Dispatch. He left the newspaper to do magazine illustrations and advertising art.

In 1933, Davis met St. Louis advertising agency executive Lee Falk, and the two began their collaboration on Mandrake the Magician. Falk asked Davis to do a dozen panels on spec. Davis did so, and in 1934 Falk went to New York and pitched the concept to King Features Syndicate. The strip was launched June 11, 1934 with Davis illustrating and Falk scripting. One of Davis' assistants was Ray Moore, who later became the first artist on Falk's other comic strip, The Phantom, also distributed by King Features.

== WWII ==
During World War II, Davis was drafted. As art director of the Curtiss-Wright Aircraft Company, he edited and illustrated the A-25 bomber instrumentation manual. Davis' wife Martha was a fashion designer, and she collaborated with him on Mandrake during World War II, as detailed in a 1949 Editor & Publisher article:

Not only can Davis put on silk topper and cloak and pass for Mandrake, but Mrs. Davis can slip into one of the fashionable frocks of Narda, the heroine, and Mandrake fans would see the resemblance. Mrs. Davis, as a matter of fact, often draws Narda. An artist in her own right, and a fashion illustrator for a St. Louis department store until early in War II, Martha Davis got in the habit of drawing Narda—and sometimes the entire strip—when her husband was working with the Curtiss-Wright Corp., illustrating Air Force manuals. "Without her help," says Davis, "Mandrake probably would have folded." Mrs. Davis enjoyed her work on the strip so much she stayed on after the War. Now the couple produce it as a joint effort, but Phil usually does Mandrake and Martha usually does Narda. They work in a studio in downtown St. Louis, move out into the Ozarks in the summer. Mandrake is another strip with double-appeal—to the men for adventure action, and to the women because of the accurate modishness of Narda's wardrobe. Davis denies any resemblance, especially Mandrake's lust for strenuous exercise. "When I get the desire to exercise," he says, "I just lie down for awhile [sic] until it passes."

Davis continued to do Mandrake until his 1964 death from a heart attack. Falk then recruited artist Fred Fredericks for the strip.

== Sources ==
- Goulart, Ron. The Encyclopedia of American Comics from 1897 to the Present. Facts on File, 1990.
