= David McKay Publications =

US book & comic publisher (1882–1986)

- Founded: September 1882
- Founder: David McKay
- Defunct: 1986 (assets now owned by Penguin Random House)
- Successor: Random House
- Country of origin: United States
- Headquarters location: Philadelphia, Pennsylvania

David McKay Publications (also known as David McKay Company) was an American book publisher which also published some of the first comic books, including the long-running titles Ace Comics, King Comics, and Magic Comics; as well as collections of such popular comic strips as Blondie, Dick Tracy, and Mandrake the Magician. McKay was also the publisher of the Fodor's travel guides.

== History ==
David McKay was born in Dysart, Scotland, on June 24, 1860. At the age of 11, he came to the United States with his parents. At the age of 13, he began working for J. B. Lippincott & Co., learning the bookselling trade. By the age of 21, he was placed in charge of the miscellaneous catalog of books by publisher Rees Welsh. One year later, upon hearing McKay had been offered a position with a rival publisher, Welsh asked McKay to take the helm, offering to sell the entire publishing firm to him. In September 1882, with $500 of his own money and $2,500 in borrowed money and notes, McKay began his own publishing company on South 9th Street in Philadelphia.

At age 25, McKay published the first collected set of Shakespeare’s works in the United States. By December 1905, McKay had absorbed many rival publishing houses into his own, and was publishing books in almost every popular genre of the time, including world literature, textbooks, and a number of children's books.

=== Comics ===
In 1935, the company recognized the potential of the comic book medium and began selling collections of such popular strips as Henry and Popeye. In 1936 they began publishing collections of King Features Syndicate strips in King Comics, and in 1937 followed with the Ace Comics title. Ace Comics #11, the first appearance of The Phantom, is regarded by many to be a key issue in the history of comics, as it introduced one of the first of the costumed heroes, leading to the Golden Age of superheroes in comics.

McKay's son Alexander would follow in his father's shoes by taking over the house to go on to publish Walt Disney’s first Mickey Mouse comics, the Blondie and Dagwood comic series, and numerous other notable works. David McKay Publications essentially ceased publishing comics in 1950.

=== Acquisitions and demise ===
In 1950, David McKay was acquired by two executives from Putnam. In 1961, McKay acquired the American operations of Longmans, Green & Co. In 1968, McKay acquired the publishing company Ives Washburn, known for its children's books. In 1973, David McKay Publications purchased Henry Z. Walck Publications, a publisher of scholarly and children's books, and Charterhouse Books, which it had launched two years earlier in partnership with Richard Kluger. Other imprints acquired included Weybright & Talley and Peter H. Wyden. In 1968, David McKay Publications was bought by Maxwell M. Geffen. At the end of 1973, David McKay Publications was acquired by the British magazine publisher Morgan Grampian, in which Geffen had an interest.

Random House purchased David McKay Publications in 1986.

== Titles ==
- Ace Comics (1937–1950)
- Barney Baxter (1938)
- Blondie (1942)
- Blondie Comics (Spring 1947-December 1949/January 1950)
- Blondie: 100 Selected Top-Laughs of America's Best Loved Comic (1944)
- Dick Tracy (1937)
- Feature Book (May 1937 – 1948)
  - Mandrake the Magician (1938)
  - Perry Mason (1946)
  - The Phantom (1939)
  - Prince Valiant (1941)
- Future Comics (1940)
- Henry (1935)
- The Katzenjammer Kids (Summer 1947-circa 1949)
- King Comics (April 1936-November/December 1949)
- Little Annie Rooney (1935)
- Little Orphan Annie and the Kidnappers (1941, giveaway)
- Little Orphan Annie Popped Wheat Giveaway (1947)
- Magic Comics (1939–1950)
- Mickey Mouse Series (1931-1934)
- Popeye (1935)
- The Romance of Flying (circa late 1942)
- They'll Do It Every Time (by Jimmy Hatlo, 1939)
- Conquest of Peru - William H. Prescott

== Book series ==
- American Classics Series
- International Library
- Living Thoughts Library
- McKay Chess Library
- The Newbery Classics
- The Pocket Classics
- Stalking (implied series of titles by Euell Gibbons)
- Tartan Books
