= Phantom (character) =

Comic book superhero

The Phantom
- Moonstone Books' The Phantom #12 (2006); Cover art by Joe Prado

Publication information
- Publisher: Comic strip: King Features Syndicate; Comic books: David McKay Publications; Harvey Comics; Gold Key Comics; King Comics; DC Comics; Marvel Comics; Diamond Comics; Moonstone Books; Dark Horse comics Image Comics
- First appearance: "The Singh Brotherhood" (daily strip) (February 1936)
- Created by: Lee Falk

In-story information
- Notable aliases: Kit Walker
- Abilities: Expert martial artist and hand-to-hand combatant; Expert marksman and swordsman; Genius-level intellect; Peak athletic condition; Use of technologically advanced weaponry

The Phantom is a fictional superhero character who operates from the fictional country of Bangalla in Africa. The character was created by Lee Falk for the adventure comic strip The Phantom, which debuted in newspapers on February 17, 1936.

The Phantom was later depicted in many forms of media, including television shows, films, comic books, and video games. He is considered one of earliest costumed comic book superheroes, predating characters such as Superman and Batman.

== Publication history ==
=== Comic strip ===
Lee Falk's syndicated newspaper comic strip The Phantom premiered on February 17, 1936, with the story "The Singh Brotherhood", written by Falk and illustrated first by himself, for two weeks, followed by Ray Moore, who was an assistant to artist Phil Davis on Falk's Mandrake the Magician strip. A Sunday Phantom strip was added to newspapers on May 28, 1939. During Moore's World War II military service, he left the strip to his assistant, Wilson McCoy. Upon Moore's return, he worked on the strip on and off until 1949, when McCoy succeeded him. Following McCoy's death in 1961, Carmine Infantino and Bill Lignante (who would later draw several Phantom stories directly for comic books) filled in before Sy Barry was chosen as a successor. Barry would continue working on the strip for over 30 years before retiring in 1994.

Barry's longtime assistant, George Olesen, remained on the strip as penciller, with Keith Williams joining as the inker for the daily strip. The Sunday strip was inked by Eric Doescher until Fred Fredericks became the regular inker in 1995.

Falk continued to script Phantom until his death on March 13, 1999. His last daily and Sunday strip stories, "Terror at the Opera" and "The Kidnappers", respectively, were finished by his wife, Elizabeth Falk, after the hospitalized Falk had torn off his oxygen mask to dictate the adventures. After Falk's death, King Features Syndicate collaborated with the European comics publisher Egmont on the strip. They went from initially publishing Phantom stories in licensed comic books to providing the stories for the newspaper strip by adapting their own comic-book stories. Tony DePaul and Claes Reimerthi alternated as writers of the daily and Sunday newspaper strips, respectively. DePaul would later become the sole writer of the strip.

In 2000, Olesen and Fredericks retired from the Sunday strip, which was then taken over by artist Graham Nolan. Olesen and Williams left the daily strip after Olesen retired, and artist Paul Ryan took over the daily in early 2005. Ryan succeeded Nolan as artist on the Sunday strip in 2007. On July 31, 2011, Eduardo Barreto became the Sunday artist. Barreto died after only a few months of working on the strip, and Ryan did the January 15, 2012, Sunday page and the following week's comics before Terry Beatty became Barreto's permanent replacement.

=== Comic books ===
Through the 1940s, The Phantom strips were reprinted in David McKay Publications' Ace Comics. The following decade, Harvey Comics published The Phantom comic book. In 1962, Gold Key Comics took over, followed by King Comics in 1966 and Charlton Comics in 1969. This lasted until 1977, with a total of 73 issues being published. Some of the main Phantom artists during these years were Bill Lignante, Don Newton, Jim Aparo, and Pat Boyette.

In 1987, Marvel Comics published a four-issue miniseries based on the Defenders of the Earth TV series, written by Stan Lee. A subsequent three-issue Marvel miniseries, The Phantom: The Ghost Who Walks (Feb.-April 1995), was written and drawn by David de Vries and Glenn Lumsden. Marvel released another four-issue miniseries (May–August 1995) pencilled by Spider-Man co-creator Steve Ditko, based on the Phantom 2040 TV series. One issue featured a pin-up by the original two Spider-Man signature artists, Ditko and John Romita Sr.

DC Comics published a Phantom comic book from 1988 to 1990. The initial miniseries (dated May–August 1988) was written by Peter David and drawn by Joe Orlando and Dennis Janke. The subsequent series, written by Mark Verheiden and drawn by Luke McDonnell, ran for 13 issues (March 1989 – March 1990).

Beginning in 2002, Moonstone Books published five Phantom graphic novels, written by Tom DeFalco, Ben Raab, and Ron Goulart. In 2003, Moonstone debuted a Phantom comic-book series written by Raab, Rafael Nieves, and Chuck Dixon, and drawn by artists including Pat Quinn, Jerry DeCaire, Nick Derington, Rich Burchett, and EricJ. After 11 issues, Mike Bullock took over scripting, with Gabriel Rearte and Carlos Magno creating the artwork before Silvestre Szilagyi became the regular artist in 2007. In 2006, Moonstone published a retcon of the Phantom's origin, called Legacy, by Raab and Quinn. That same year, the company published a hybrid comic book and prose book it called "wide-vision", premiering the format with the Phantom story "Law of the Jungle". Moonstone also released the first American Phantom annual. A second annual teamed up the Phantom with Mandrake the Magician.

In 2009, Moonstone re-launched the series as The Phantom: Ghost Who Walks, starting with issue #0 (an origin retelling). That same year, Moonstone launched the 21 issue series Phantom Generations, with each of the 21 Phantoms spotlighted in his own story, by different creative teams including writers Ben Raab, Tom DeFalco, Tony Bedard, Will Murray, and Mike Bullock, and artists including Pat Quinn, Alex Saviuk, Don Hudson, Scott Brooks, and Zeu. Moonstone also published "Phantom Action", written by Mike Bullock, that depicted the Phantom meeting Captain Action, a five-issue black-and-white miniseries called "The Phantom Double Shot: KGB Noir", and a two-issue miniseries, "The Phantom: Unmasked".

In August 2010, Dynamite Entertainment debuted the monthly series The Last Phantom, by writer Scott Beatty and artist Eduardo Ferigato, with covers painted by Alex Ross. In 2013, the Phantom appeared in Dynamite's five-issue miniseries Kings Watch. The story, written by Jeff Parker and drawn by Marc Laming, saw the Phantom teaming up with Flash Gordon and Mandrake the Magician to fight Ming the Merciless and prevent his attempt to take over the planet.

In 2014, Hermes Press announced the publication of a Phantom comic-book miniseries written by Peter David and illustrated by Sal Velluto. It debuted October 31, 2014. For Free Comic Book Day 2015, Hermes published a Phantom comic book with art by Bill Lignante and samples of the new miniseries.

== Fictional character biography ==
In the jungles of the fictional African country of Bangalla, there is a myth featuring The Ghost Who Walks, a powerful and indestructible guardian of the innocent and fighter of all types of injustice. Because he seems to have existed for generations, many believe him to be immortal. In reality, the Phantom is a legacy hero, descended from 20 previous generations of crimefighters who all adopt the same persona. When a new Phantom assumes the role from his dying father, he swears the Oath of the Skull: "I swear to devote my life to the destruction of piracy, greed, cruelty, and injustice, in all their forms, and my sons and their sons shall follow me". The first Phantom married Christina, the daughter of a Norwegian sea captain, Eric the Rover. The second Phantom married Marabella, the granddaughter of Christopher Columbus.

The comic sometimes runs flashback adventures of previous Phantoms written by various authors who sometimes confuse Phantom history. Current stories have Marabella as the daughter of Columbus and marrying the first Phantom. As Columbus died in 1506 while, according to the new history, Marabella first meets the Phantom in 1544, this results in another inconsistency, requiring her to be at least 38 years old despite being depicted as in her early 20s. Inconsistencies in storylines and histories are not corrected as a mark of respect to authors, but Falk's original history takes precedence.

Although most of the Phantoms have been male, there has been one woman who took up the role: Julie Walker, twin sister of the 17th Phantom. While her brother was injured, Julie donned the Phantom costume and defeated a band of pirates.

The present Phantom is the 21st in the line. Unlike most costumed heroes, he has no superhuman powers, relying only on his wits, physical strength, skill with his weapons, and fearsome reputation to fight crime. His real name is Kit Walker. References to "Mr. Walker" are in the strip often accompanied by a footnote saying "For 'The Ghost Who Walks'", although some versions of the Phantom's history suggest that Walker was actually the original surname of the man who became the first Phantom.

=== Origin ===
The story of the Phantom started with a young sailor named Christopher Walker (sometimes called Christopher Standish in certain versions of the story). Christopher was born in 1516 in Portsmouth. His father, also named Christopher Walker, had been a seaman since he was a young boy, and was the cabin boy on Christopher Columbus' ship, the Santa María, when he sailed to the Americas. Christopher Jr. became a shipboy on his father's ship in 1526.

In 1536, when Christopher was 20 years old, he was a part of what was supposed to be his father's last voyage. The ship was attacked somewhere in the Bay of Bengal by pirates and Christopher's father was murdered. He was the sole survivor and was washed ashore on a Bengalla beach, where he was found by pygmies of the Bandar tribe, who nursed him back to health and took care of him. He vows revenge, dedicating himself to "the destruction of piracy, greed, cruelty, and injustice, in all their forms!"

The Bandars showed Christopher to a cave, which resembled a human skull in appearance. Christopher later carved the features out to enhance this. The Skull Cave became his home.

Wearing a costume based on the demon god, Christopher became the first incarnation of what would later be known as the Phantom. When he died, his son took over for him, when the second Phantom died, his son took over, and so on. So it would go on through the centuries, causing people to believe that the Phantom was immortal. These people gave him nicknames including "The Ghost Who Walks" and "The Man Who Cannot Die".

His base is in the Deep Woods of Bengali (originally "Bengalla", or "Bangalla" and renamed Denkali in the Indian edition), a fictional country initially said to be set in Asia, near India, but depicted as in Africa during and after the 1960s. The Phantom's base is the fabled Skull Cave, where all of the previous Phantoms are buried.

The Phantom is the commander of Bangalla's Jungle Patrol. Because of a betrayal leading to the death of the 14th Phantom, the identity of the commander has been kept hidden from members of the patrol ever since. The Phantom uses several ways to stay in contact. These include radio and a safe with a false bottom.

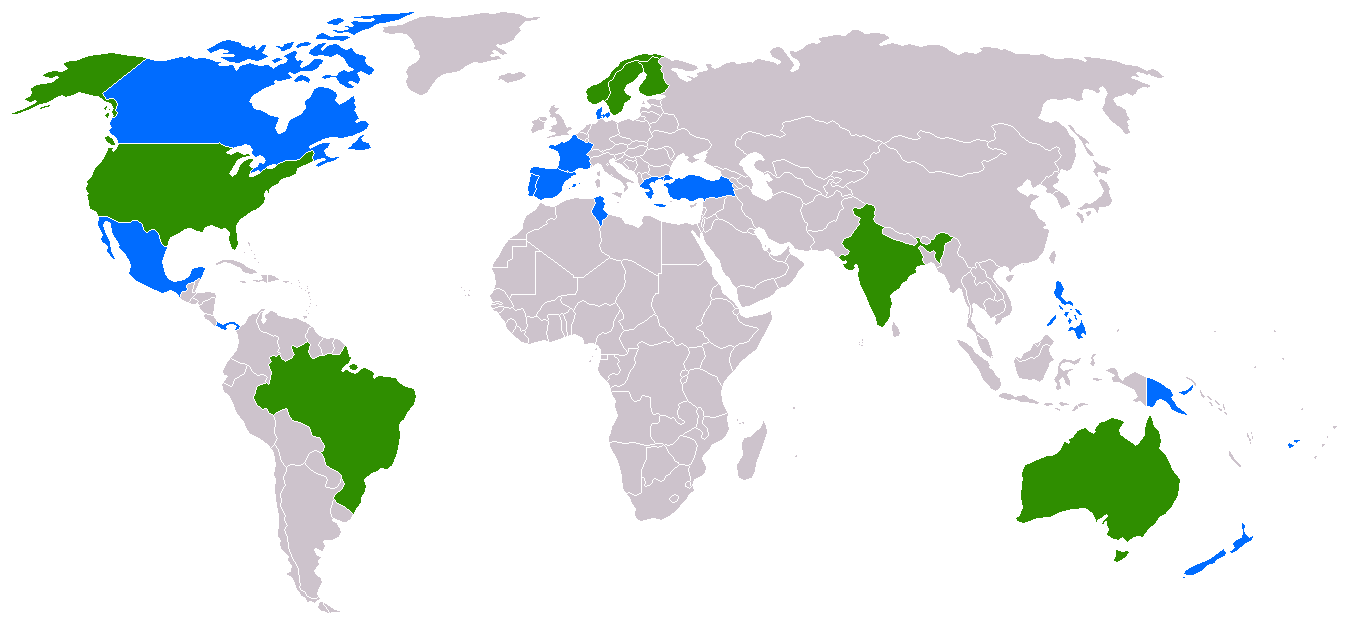
Map of countries printing The Phantom as of 2006. Green countries have regular Phantom publications, while blue countries print the dailies/Sundays in newspapers.

=== Kit Walker, the 21st Phantom ===
The 21st Phantom's birth name is Kit Walker, as was the name of many of the Phantoms before him. Kit was born in Skull Cave and spent his first years in the jungle of Bangalla. His mother, Maud Thorne McPatrick, who had previously worked as Rita Hayworth's stunt double, was born in Mississippi, where Kit was sent to study when he was 12 years old, living with his aunt Lucy and uncle Jasper in the town of Clarksville, Missouri.

Here, he met his wife-to-be, Diana Palmer. Kit was an extremely talented sportsman and was predicted to become the world champion in many different events (even knocking out the world heavyweight boxing champion in a sparring match when the champion visited Clarksville). Despite the opportunity to choose practically any career he wanted, Kit faithfully returned to Bengalla to take over the role of the Phantom when he received word from Guran that his father was dying from a knife wound.

One of Kit's first missions as the Phantom was to find his father's killer, Rama Singh, who had betrayed and murdered the 20th Phantom by first helping him to blow up a fleet of ships owned by the Singh Brotherhood, only to then stab him in the back, stealing his special gunbelt in the process. The 21st Phantom eventually found him and reclaimed the belt at the island of Gullique, but before he could avenge his father and bring the killer to jail, the desperate Rama blew up his lair, killing himself and his henchmen in the process.

The Phantom has several animal helpers: the mountain wolf Devil, the horse Hero, and the falcon Fraka. From 1962 on, The Phantom raised an orphan named "Rex King", who was later revealed to be the prince of the kingdom of Baronkhan. He also has two dolphins named Solomon and Nefertiti, and numerous other animals kept on the island of Eden.

In 1978, he married his sweetheart, Diana Palmer, who works at the United Nations. The Phantom and Diana have two children, Kit and Heloise. His chief aide and ally is Guran, chief of the local pygmy Bandar tribe, who are the only tribe to know the Phantom's true nature. Guran has been the Phantom's best friend since childhood and a supporter of his cause. Other allies of the 21st Phantom include Doctor Axel, a Scandinavian doctor working in Bangalla, and Miss Tagama, the African teacher of Rex, Kit and Heloise.

=== Costume and weapons ===
As part of the official uniform, the Phantom wears a black domino mask and a purple skintight bodysuit. He also carries period-appropriate sidearms, currently two M1911 pistols in a special belt with a skull-like buckle. Falk has insisted that the Phantom only uses his guns to shoot out the guns of his opponents, a fact that writer Peter David was unaware of when he wrote DC Comics' 1988 four-issue Phantom miniseries, in which he had the Phantom shoot to wound his enemies. However, there are some early instances (in the Lee Falk strips) of the Phantom using his guns to shoot and kill people (sometimes in self-defense).

While there had been masked crime fighters like the costumed Zorro, The Shadow, or the business-suited The Clock, the Phantom was the first fictional character to wear the skintight costume and eyes with no visible pupils that has become a trademark of superheroes. Creator Lee Falk had originally envisioned a gray costume and even considered naming his creation "The Gray Ghost". It was not until the Phantom Sunday strip debuted in 1939 that the costume was shown to be purple. Falk, however, continued to refer to the costume as gray in the text of the strip on several occasions afterward, but finally accepted the purple color. In a Sunday strip story published in the 1960s it was shown that the first Phantom chose the costume based on the appearance of a jungle idol, and colored the cloth with purple jungle berries.

As part of a modernization of the character in the Moonstone Books' series, The Phantom: Ghost Who Walks, the Phantom began wearing a costume made of kevlar.

=== The Phantom Rings ===
A signature of the character is his two rings. One has a pattern formed like four crossing sabres, "The Good Mark", that he leaves on visitors whom he befriends, placing the person under his protection. The other, "The Evil Mark" or "Skull Mark" has a skull shape, which leaves a scar of the corresponding shape on the enemies he punches with it. He wears the Good Mark on his left hand because it is closer to the heart, and the Evil Mark on his right hand. According to the Team Fantomen stories, the Skull Ring was given to the first Phantom by Paracelsus. The original owner of the Skull Ring was Emperor Nero of the Roman Empire and it would later be revealed that the ring had been made from the nails that hung Jesus to the cross. The Good Mark ring was made after the sixth Phantom founded the Jungle Patrol.

=== Enemies ===
The most dangerous and lasting enemy of the Phantom is the Singh Brotherhood, active for centuries and responsible for the death of the 21st Phantom's father. In the 1970s, Falk's comics changed the group's name to the "Sengh Brotherhood", or "Sanngh Brotherhood". This is because "Singh" is a common name in India, and Falk wished to avoid offending Indian readers by implying that the organization originated in that country. The group's name was changed to "the Singa Pirates" in the Indian comics for the same reason. In Egmont's Phantom comics, the brotherhood has evolved into a modern company called Singh Corporations.

Another criminal organization that the Phantom repeatedly clashes with is the Sky Band, a group of all-female air pirates. Frequent antagonists of successive Phantoms are the depraved inhabitants of the "Eastern Dark" region (also known as "Dakk") who carry out human sacrifice and drug trafficking. The Phantom's repeated role in thwarting the activities of the Dakk people is the source of his "Guardian of the Eastern Dark" title. Recurring villainous characters in the newspaper strips are pirate leader Baron Grover, terrorist commander Skul, warmonger General Bababu, and international terrorist The Python. Antagonists in the Team Fantomen stories include larcenous art collector Jason Parnassos, thief Vasti Riba, dictator Prince Grigor, murderous treasure hunter Bail, and Goldhand, named for his prosthetic hand made of solid gold. A major threat to the Phantom was Kigali Lubanga, the President of Bengalla for several years. Foes of the Phantom in the Moonstone stories include disfigured kickboxer Manuel Ortega, Ali Gutaale and HIM. Other enemies of the Phantom include Rebecca Madison (in the Phantom 2040 series), and Xander Drax (in the 1996 film). Another villainous gang that has been a sworn enemy of The Phantom is the "Vultures". They have several "nests" spread across the world, and as their name suggests, they prey on the weak and fallen. They will strike the helpless, especially during crisis situations.

== In other media ==
=== Novels and short stories ===
==== Whitman ====
The first novel about the Phantom was published in 1944 by Whitman Publishing Company, and was called "The Son of the Phantom". Written by Dale Robertson, the book was based on Lee Falk's comic strip story "Childhood of the Phantom", although Falk had no involvement with the novel. It featured a cover drawn by Wilson McCoy. The Phantom's son, while in the United States, studying and meeting Diana Palmer, is called Kip Walker. His home country in the novel is Bengali.

==== Avon ====
Avon Publications in the United States put out 15 books based on Lee Falk's stories. The series ran from 1972 to 1975, and was written by several authors, including Falk; the covers were done by George Wilson. Many of the books were translated into foreign languages.

1. The Story of the Phantom: The Ghost Who Walks 1972, Lee Falk
2. The Slave Market of Mucar 1972, Basil Copper
3. The Scorpia Menace 1972, Basil Copper
4. The Veiled Lady 1973, Frank S. Shawn (pseudonym of Ron Goulart)
5. The Golden Circle 1973, Frank S. Shawn
6. The Mysterious Ambassador 1973, Lee Falk
7. The Mystery of the Sea Horse 1973, Frank S. Shawn
8. The Hydra Monster 1973, Frank S. Shawn
9. Killer's Town 1973, Lee Falk
10. The Goggle-Eyed Pirates 1974, Frank S. Shawn
11. The Swamp Rats 1974, Frank S. Shawn
12. The Vampires & the Witch 1974, Lee Falk
13. The Island of Dogs 1975, Warren Shanahan
14. The Assassins 1975, Carson Bingham
15. The Curse of the Two-Headed Bull 1975, Lee Falk

In 2006, the books The Story of the Phantom: The Ghost Who Walks and The Veiled Lady were released as audiobooks in Norway and Sweden, as part of the celebration of the seventieth anniversary of the character.

To coincide with the 1996 Phantom movie, Avon published The Phantom, based on the Paramount Pictures film. It was written by Rob MacGregor.

Hermes Press also published a reprint of the Avon novels.

==== Moonstone Books ====
In 2007, Moonstone Books released The Phantom Chronicles, a collection of short stories written by authors Mike Bullock, Ron Fortier, Jim Alexander, David Michelinie, Craig Shaw Gardner, CJ Henderson, Clay and Susan Griffith, Will Murray, Michael Oliveri, Nancy Kilpatrick, Ed Rhoades, David Bishop, Grant Suave, Trina Robbins, Richard Dean Starr, Dan Wickline, and Martin Powell.

The book was released in both a softcover and limited hardcover edition, and featured an introduction written by Lee Falk's daughter, Valerie Falk.

The Phantom Chronicles 2 was released in 2010. It features an unfinished story, written by Harlan Ellison, where the Phantom would have teamed up with Green Hornet, and has a foreword written by Diane Falk.

==== Other appearances ====
In Umberto Eco's novel, The Mysterious Flame of Queen Loana, the main character describes his childhood experiences of reading The Phantom, as well as other comic strip characters like Flash Gordon and Mandrake the Magician. The book also features illustrations of the Phantom, drawn by Ray Moore.

In Papua New Guinea, the Wahgi people have used images of the Phantom on their ceremonial war shields, or "kumbe reipe". Art historian N.F. Karlins believes that comic books featuring the Phantom may have been brought to Papua New Guinea by American troops as early as the 1940s. The Phantom's popularity amongst the Wahgi has been attributed to his being a "man who cannot die", and who vanquishes his enemies by using his "strength, intelligence, and fearsome reputation"; Karlins has suggested that, as Wahgi warriors wear masks, the Phantom's own mask may have also been a contributing factor. Similarly, anthropologist Susan Cochrane has described the Wahgi interpretation of the Phantom as being a "modern spirit".

=== Live-action adaptations ===
==== The Phantom serials ====
A 15-episode, 240-minute movie serial, starring Tom Tyler in the title role, was made in 1943 by Columbia Pictures and directed by action specialist B. Reeves Eason, featuring Jeanne Bates as Diana Palmer, Frank Shannon as her uncle Professor Davidson, and Ace the Wonder Dog as Devil. Creator Lee Falk was billed on screen as "Leon Falk". The story shows the 21st Phantom's first mission after taking over the mantle of the Ghost Who Walks from his murdered father: to find the Lost City of Zoloz and prevent the evil Dr. Bremmer, played by Kenneth MacDonald, from building a secret airbase in the jungle. The serial has been released on DVD through VCI.

The Phantom's real name in the serial was Geoffrey Prescott, as the alias of Kit Walker had not been mentioned in the strip at that point. However, he goes by the alias of Mr. Walker after having become the Phantom.

Two episodes loosely adapted Lee Falk's story "The Fire Princess" for the screen, and fit it into the plot of the Phantom's fight against Dr. Bremmer. Tom Tyler in costume bore a striking resemblance to the comic-strip character, and the serial was a success.

In 1955, when Columbia's serial producer Sam Katzman was making low-budget remakes of older cliffhangers, he cast John Hart in a sequel, filmed as Return of the Phantom. Hart's new scenes as the Phantom were combined with older scenes of Tom Tyler in the identical costume. Katzman failed to check with the studio's legal department, and found that its rights to the Phantom character had lapsed. Katzman, unwilling to meet the rights holder's high price, reshot much of the action with Hart in a vaguely similar costume (helmet, mask, sweater, and riding breeches) to match the old footage with Tom Tyler. Katzman, having been forced to delete many of the action scenes from The Phantom, filled the gaps with scenes from two more old serials, The Desert Hawk and Jungle Menace. The new mashup was finally released as The Adventures of Captain Africa.

==== The Phantom (1996) ====
The Phantom was also adapted into a live-action film in 1996. Produced and released by Paramount Pictures, the movie was set in the 1930s, and incorporated elements from several of the Phantom's earliest comic-strip adventures. It starred Billy Zane in the title role, Kristy Swanson as Diana Palmer, and Catherine Zeta-Jones as Sala, an aviator. It was directed by Simon Wincer, after director Joe Dante and producer Michael Douglas dropped out of the project, and was written by Jeffrey Boam, who also wrote Indiana Jones and the Last Crusade. Cult-icon Bruce Campbell was another choice for the role, but Zane, already a huge fan of the comic strip since being introduced to Australian Frew comics on the set of Dead Calm, ended up getting the part after actively lobbying for it for years. After his casting, he pumped iron for a year and a half to fill the Phantom's costume, refusing to wear a costume with moulded muscles. He also closely studied panels of the comic to capture the character's body language. Though the film was not a theatrical success, it was the reason why Zane was cast as Caledon Hockley in Titanic, the world's third most commercially successful film, and has sold well on VHS and DVD.

The movie was filmed on location in Australia, Thailand, and Los Angeles, and featured the Phantom in his attempt to stop madman Xander Drax (Treat Williams) from obtaining a weapon of doom, the legendary "Skulls of Touganda". The story also features the Singh Brotherhood, the all-female clan of air pirates known as the Sky Band, of whom Sala is the leader and a subplot wherein the 21st Phantom recovers his father's gunbelt and avenges his father's murder, inspired by the Lee Falk/Wilson McCoy story "The Belt". The film also has elements taken from the 1936 story "The Singh Brotherhood", the first Phantom story, and its 1937 continuation "The Sky Band".

In 2008, syndicated gossip columnist Liz Smith claimed that Paramount was putting a sequel into development, with Zane returning to play the title role, because of the good VHS and DVD sales of the first film. The Phantom was released on Blu-ray February 2010 by Lionsgate.

==== The Phantom: Legacy ====
Sherlock Symington Productions secured the rights to the Phantom in December 2008, and were set to make a film called The Phantom: Legacy (unrelated to the Moonstone Books 2006 graphic novel of the same name and any other screen incarnation of the character). The film was set to have a budget of $130 million, and be written by Tim Boyle.

Bruce Sherlock, executive producer and head of Sherlock Symington Productions, said that The Phantom: Legacy would follow the lead of films like The Dark Knight and Iron Man, and present a serious treatment of the character. The film will be set in the present day, and revolve around the relationship between the Phantom and his son, and what it means to be the Phantom. Work on the film was expected to begin in 2009. Filming was scheduled to take place in Australia, and producers were in talks with both Australian and international actors to work on the film.

In an interview with Dark Horizons, Boyle said the film would feature two main antagonists, one taken from the comic and one created for the movie. The Phantom's costume was expected to be updated for the screen, with Boyle seeking to make it more reality-based. Characters such as Diana Palmer, Kit, Heloise Walker, Colonel Worubu, President Lamanda Luaga, and Guran would appear. The film was said to be heavily focused on the mythology of the comics, with a lot of screen time expected to be devoted to the origin of the 1st Phantom. The Phantom's eyes behind his mask would be white, unlike in previous film-versions. Actor Sam Worthington was considered to play the Phantom, after having worked with Boyle on the film Fink.

Boyle was originally considered to direct the film, but in 2011 confirmed he was only attached as the writer.

==== 2014 announcement ====
In 2014 Mark Gordon and his production company were developing a new film with Management 360, Drew Simon was executive producing, and they were looking for a new writer on the script.

==== Unauthorized versions ====
At least three unauthorized Phantom movies were made in Turkey. Two were made in 1968 and both were titled Kızıl Maske (the Turkish name for the Phantom, translated as "Red Mask"). The Phantom was played by Ismet Erten and Irfan Atasoy. The costume worn by Irfan Atasoy bears little resemblance to the one seen in the comic strip, but the uniforms worn by Ismet Erten and in Kızıl Maske'nin Intikamı (Revenge of the Red Mask), released in 1971, stayed close to the original outfit.

=== Television ===
==== 1961 pilot ====
An unaired color Phantom TV-pilot was made in 1961 starring Roger Creed as the Phantom, with Lon Chaney Jr. and Paulette Goddard as the antagonists, and Richard Kiel as the assassin "Big Mike". Called "No Escape", the pilot saw the Phantom breaking up a slave camp in the jungle.

Made on a limited budget, the pilot features fight scenes and the Phantom terrorizing villains in the jungle. Writer John Carr originally wrote four episodes, but because the pilot was not picked up by a network, the remaining three were never filmed. Actress Marilyn Manning had originally been cast as Diana Palmer, but never appeared in the pilot. Devil, Hero, and the Jungle Patrol all appear throughout the course of the story.

The pilot was shown at the Mid-Atlantic Nostalgia Convention in 2008 and has also been shown at San Diego Comic-Con.

==== Popeye Meets the Man Who Hated Laughter ====
The Phantom made an appearance alongside other King Features characters in the 1972 animated movie Popeye Meets the Man Who Hated Laughter.

==== Defenders of the Earth ====
In Defenders of the Earth, which ran from 1986 to 1987, the 27th Phantom, voiced by actor Peter Mark Richman, teams up with fellow King Features adventurers Flash Gordon, Mandrake the Magician, and Mandrake's bodyguard and assistant Lothar. The cartoon also featured a daughter, Jedda Walker, who briefly took on the Phantom mantle in an episode where she believed her father to have perished.

Other episodes of the series featured classic Phantom villains like the Sky Band, the Phantom's evil older brother Kurt Walker (created specifically for the show), and a flashback to the days of the first Phantom. The episode "Return of the Sky Band" also featured lengthy flashbacks to the Phantom of Lee Falk's comic strip, the 21st Phantom, showing him and his wife, Diana Palmer, and their encounter with the original Sky Band.

In the original presentation pilot for the series, the Phantom had a son, Kit Walker, and Flash Gordon had a daughter, but this was changed for the final series.

In Defenders of the Earth, the Phantom was able to use supernatural means to give himself increased strength and speed, by saying the incantation:

"By jungle law, the ghost who walks calls forth the power of ten tigers!"

It is only in this cartoon series that the Phantom has such an ability. In the series, the Phantom also used a special helicopter nicknamed the Skull Copter, and had an updated Skull Ring that would shoot a laser on to the faces of antagonists, marking them for life.

The complete series has been released on DVD in several editions, the latest in 2010.

==== Phantom 2040 ====
Premiering in 1994 to widespread critical acclaim, Phantom 2040 depicts the adventures of the 24th Phantom on a future Earth rife with pollution and heavy industrialization. Young Kit Walker, was living happily with his aunt Heloise (daughter of the 21st Phantom) in the city of Metropia (previously known as New York) in the year 2040, knowing nothing about his family's legacy, when one day, The Phantom's friend Guran turned up to reveal the secret of the Phantom legacy. Kit takes up the mantle of the Phantom, and starts a battle against the evil company Maximum Inc., and their plans for the "Maximum Era" (a horrific plan for world domination through mass extinction by the complete collapse of Earth's ecosystem). He also tries to solve the mystery of the death of his father, the 23rd Phantom.

This animated series, created by David J. Corbett and Judith and Garfield Reeves-Stevens, lasted two seasons (35 episodes) and spawned a number of merchandise tie-ins, a comic book series, and a video game. The show's ahead-of-its time voice casting and vocal direction by Stuart M. Rosen had a lasting impact on animated adventure television, introducing (alongside Andrea Romano's acclaimed work on Batman: The Animated Series) a new level of maturity and complexity to animated vocal performance that set the standard for all TV animation that followed.

The Phantom was voiced by actor Scott Valentine and J.D.Hall played The Phantom's mentor Guran. Margot Kidder voiced main antagonist Rebecca Madison while Jeff Bennett played her sociopathic son Max Madison Jr. Ron Perlman (and, later, Richard Lynch) played tortured cyborg Graft, Debbie Harry played Vaingloria, and Mark Hamill lent his voice to the character of Dr. Jak.

The first four episodes of the series were edited into a feature-length film and released on VHS in 1994 and 1996 (and later on DVD in 2004), called Phantom 2040: The Ghost Who Walks. Other episodes of the series were released on VHS in 1995. Season One (containing the first 20 episodes of the show) was released on DVD in Australia in 2013.

==== Betaal Pachisi ====
A series aired on Doordarshan in 1997 named Betaal Pachisi depicting the 25th Phantom played by Shahbaz Khan. He is shown fighting poachers and supernatural entities. Krutika Desai Khan plays Naina Jogan, the jungle spirit in love with Betaal (the Phantom). Sonu Walia plays a TV reporter who becomes his love interest.

==== The Phantom (Syfy) ====
Screenwriter Daniel Knauf and his son and collaborator Charles Knauf completed a four-hour TV-movie script for Sci Fi Channel, later renamed Syfy, starring the 22nd Phantom. The mini-series, simply called The Phantom, and was produced by Muse Entertainment and RHI Entertainment. It premiered in Canada on The Movie Network in December 2009, as a two-part mini-series, a total of three hours.

Ryan Carnes stars as the Phantom, with Paolo Barzman directing. The series was shot in New York City, Costa Rica and Montreal.

The story sees law student Kit learning that he was adopted, and that he is actually the son of the 21st Phantom and Diana Palmer Walker. He joins the Phantom team in the jungles of Bengalla (in this version, Bengalla is a small island in Indonesia), and is trained in martial arts and combat, emerging as the next Phantom to battle the Singh Brotherhood and save the only man who can bring peace to the Middle East. The 22nd Phantom wears a modified costume that is highly resistant to bullets, blades and falls, doubles his strength and can make him move faster.

The mini-series aired on Syfy in June 2010, and was released on Blu-ray and DVD by Vivendi Entertainment.

==== Parodies ====
Paul Hogan, of Crocodile Dundee fame, continually parodied the Phantom on his Australian TV-show, The Paul Hogan Show. He would dress up in the purple Phantom costume, and act out different humorous situations. The Phantom had also been frequently parodied on Scandinavian television, in different humor programs.

In 1984, Australian stand-up comedian Austen Tayshus released a single Phantom Shuffle in the video of which he appeared in Phantom costume, wearing sunglasses instead of a mask. Many elements of the Phantom myth were parodied, such as him being "Mr Walker, the man who cannot drive".

In 2017, Australian comedian Sammy J began touring with a new show, Hero Complex, in which he pays tribute to what he says is the role the Phantom has played in his life: "a chance encounter set off a chain of events that led to me meeting my wife and ended with police searching my attic". Hero Complex has won a "Best Comedy" award or nomination in every festival in which it has featured.

In the Adult Swim show The Venture Bros., the character The Phantom Limb bears a strong visual resemblance to the Phantom, right down to the same purple suit and mask, except that the Phantom Limb's limbs are invisible, making him look like a floating torso. However, The Phantom Limb is a villainous character.

He also appeared in the animated Beatles movie Yellow Submarine.

The myth surrounding the Phantom also provided Turkish humorists with a lot of material. The humor magazine Leman has published many comic strips some of which were inspired by the (imaginary) saying "in the jungle, it is rumored that the Phantom has the strength of ten tigers" where Phantom runs into trouble with 11 or more tigers.

The Phantom was parodied in a 2007 episode of Robot Chicken titled "Werewolf vs. Unicorn", where he appeared alongside Flash Gordon and Mandrake the Magician. He was voiced by Frank Welker.

The Phantom was a frequently appearing character in the Finnish comic strip Fingerpori by Pertti Jarla. He was often involved in humorous situations such as using his throne as a toilet seat.

==== Documentaries ====
In 1996, the A&E Network created a documentary about the history of the Phantom for television, called The Phantom: Comic Strip Crusader. Narrated by Peter Graves, it featured interviews with creator Lee Falk, actors Billy Zane and Kristy Swanson, director Simon Wincer, Frew-editor Jim Shepherd, George Olesen, Keith Williams, and president of the US Phantom fan club Friends of the Phantom, Ed Rhoades. The documentary was released on DVD in 2006.

To promote the 1996 Paramount Phantom movie, an HBO special called "Making of The Phantom" was made. It featured behind-the-scenes information on the movie and the comic.

An original documentary presentation called History of the Phantom was shown at the Mid-Atlantic Nostalgia Convention in September 2008.

==== MythBusters "Superhero Hour" ====
On MythBusters season 5, episode 17 "Superhero Hour", it was tested whether the Phantom's skull ring would make an imprint on someone when you punch them while wearing it, as it did in the comic. The result was that the myth was "busted", in that hitting a person in the face hard enough to leave a ring imprint on the skin required more than enough force to crush a human skull.

In The Last Phantom comic, it had been revealed that the Phantom's ring actually had sharp edges and was covered with a permanent ink synthesized from plants found in the depths of the Bengallan jungle, leaving a permanent scar-like mark. It was, in effect, an instant tattoo.

=== Video games ===
The Phantom has appeared as a playable character in two video games, Phantom 2040 and Defenders of the Earth. Both were based on the animated series with the same titles. However, in Defenders of the Earth, the Phantom was not the only playable character, as players were given the choice to control Mandrake the Magician and Flash Gordon as well.

In Phantom 2040, released on Sega Genesis, Game Gear, and Super NES, the Phantom was the only playable character. He had use of a number of his special skills and high-tech gadgets from the Phantom 2040 TV-series. The game had a complex storyline and featured several different endings, which were dependent on the choices the player made during the game.

In 2003, a video game made for Game Boy Advance was announced, called "The Phantom: The Ghost Who Walks". It was developed by 7th Sense and produced by Microids, and it was described as a free-roaming jungle adventure. During the development process, Microids went bankrupt, and the game was never released.

In 2006, The Phantom Mobile Game became available for cellphones, where the Phantom fought zombies, floating skulls, and other magical creatures to find his kidnapped wife, Diana Palmer. It was described as a free-roaming jungle adventure, with a film-like plot.

In 2024, The Phantom was announced for PlayStation 4, PlayStation 5, Nintendo Switch, Xbox Series X and Series S, and PC. It is being developed by Art of Play as a side-scrolling beat 'em up.

=== Theme parks ===
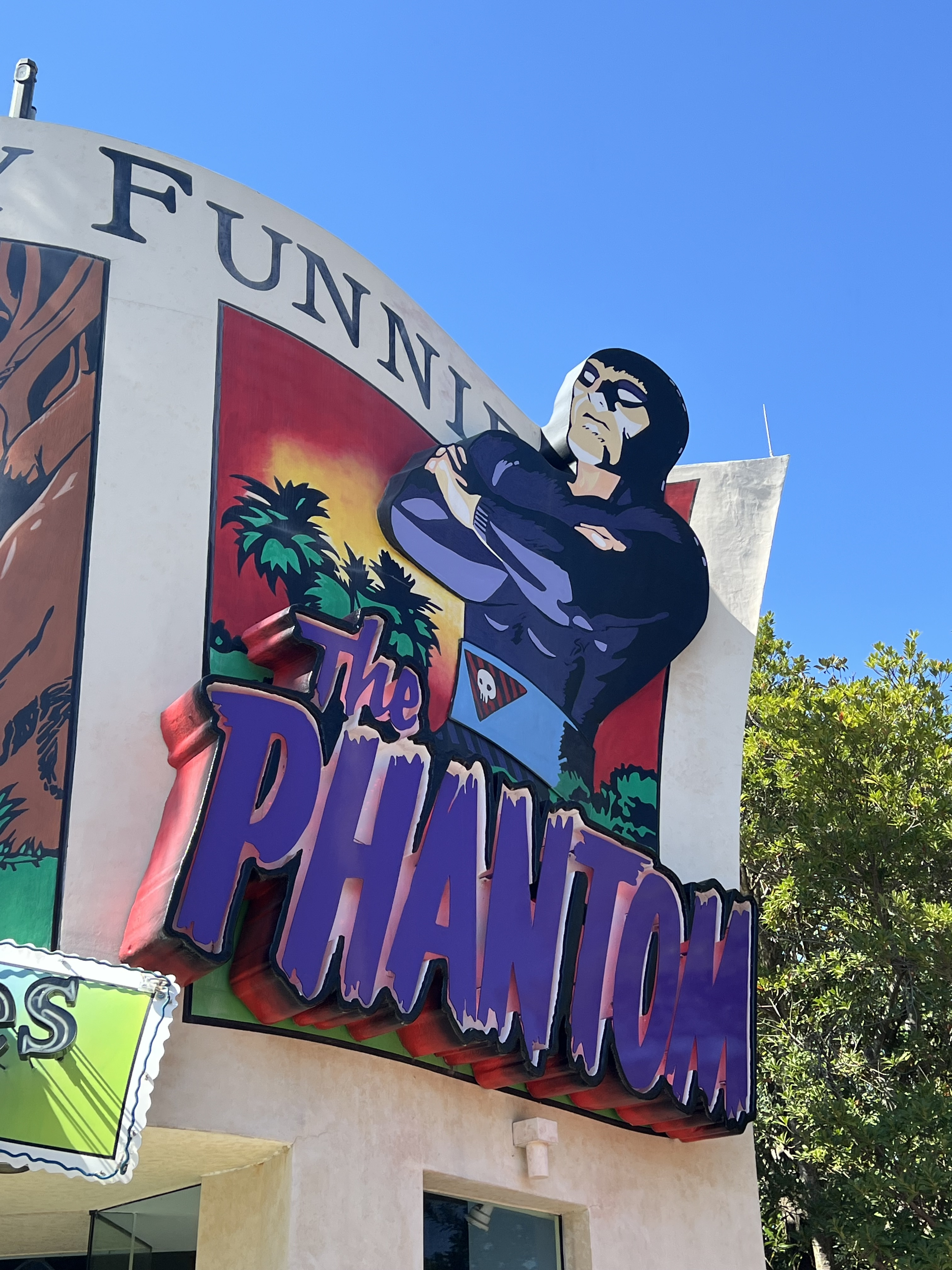
The Phantom, as portrayed above an entrance to the "Photo Funnies" gift shop in Universal Islands of Adventure's Toon Lagoon area.

"Fantomenland" ("Phantom Land") was a part of the Swedish zoo Parken Zoo, Eskilstuna, where audiences could visit the Skull Cave, and several other places from the comic, like the Whispering Grove and the headquarters of the Jungle Patrol. Visitors could also meet actors dressed up as the Phantom and witness short plays featuring the characters of the comic. Fantomenland was inaugurated by Lee Falk in 1986. Fantomenland closed in April 2010.

The architecture of the "Toon Lagoon" area at Universal Islands of Adventure, opened May 1999, showcases large extruded images of several classic comic characters, including The Phantom.

=== Fine art ===
A gallery in Brisbane, Australia, ran an exhibit of Phantom-inspired artwork in 1973. Australian Galleries ran an exhibit, "The Phantom Show", consisting of traditional art inspired by the Phantom, from December 9–21, 2014. Curated by Peter Kingston, "The Phantom Show" opened in Sydney in 2014 and travelled across Australia, stopping in Wollongong, Mackay, Toowoomba and Broken Hill. Contributing artists, all fans of The Phantom, sought to revive the spirit of Ray Moore and Wilsom McCoy's work on the original comic strip before, as Kingston put it, "The Phantom became a slick, purple superhero".
