= List of The Phantom (film) characters =

The following is an overview of the characters depicted in the 1996 live-action film adaptation of The Phantom comic strip series.

== Kit Walker/The Phantom ==
Director Simon Wincer cast Billy Zane, who had recently won praise for his work as a psychopath in Dead Calm, as the Phantom. Zane, a fan of the comic strip after being introduced to it on the set of Dead Calm, won the part after competition from Bruce Campbell and actor Kevin Smith. Zane was already a huge fan of the comic strip since being introduced to Australian Frew Publications comics on the set of Dead Calm. He ended up getting the part after actively lobbying for it for years. After his casting, he feverishly pumped iron for over a year and a half to get the right muscular look of the Phantom. He also studied the character's body language in comic strip artwork, carefully imitating it in his performance. A Batman-like costume with moulded muscles was made for him to wear, but by the time filming started, Zane was so beefed up that he did not need it.

== Supporting characters ==
=== Falkmoore ===
The Palmers' butler is named Falkmoore (played by Bernard Kates). This name is derived from Lee Falk, the creator of The Phantom, and Ray Moore, The Phantom's first artist.

=== Guran ===
In the 1996 The Phantom film, Guran makes a brief appearance played by Radmar Agana Jao. In this version he is much younger than the Phantom, and is portrayed as an Asian, rather than African as he is in the comics. He also wears a turban and a more traditional set of clothing, rather than his strange hat and unique dress sense in the comic.

=== Captain Philip Horton ===
Capt. Philip Horton (played by Robert Coleby) appears to be the leader of the Jungle Patrol, but is actually the Phantom that leads them. This is because the Patrol was started by an earlier Phantom to protect the jungle when he is not there.

=== Diana Palmer ===
Kristy Swanson portrayed Diana Palmer in Paramount's big budget film The Phantom, featuring Billy Zane as The Phantom. Diana is here sent out by her uncle Dave, in the film a wealthy newspaper publisher, to Bangalla to help with the search of a fabled weapon of doom, the Skulls of Touganda. When she is trapped by the henchmen of bad guy Xander Drax, she is saved by the Phantom, who, unbeknownst to her is really her college boyfriend, Kit Walker. Towards the end of the film (according to the novelisation), she works out the Phantom's true identity based on the fact that he appeared just after Kit disappeared.

=== Jimmy Wells ===
Jon Tenney has a small part as Jimmy Wells, a wealthy playboy who appeared in a similar role in The Singh Brotherhood.

== Villains ==
=== Xander Drax ===
The film featured the Phantom in his attempt to stop madman Xander Drax (Treat Williams) from obtaining a weapon of doom, the legendary "Skulls of Touganda".

=== Quill ===
The more realistic plots of Lee Falk's original stories were dropped in favour of an adventure tale that featured the supernatural Skulls of Touganda. Falk's story The Belt, where the Phantom fights the killer of his father, was also a major influence on the story. The name of the murderer is changed from Rama to Quill (played by James Remar), and the 20th Phantom, played by Patrick McGoohan, is portrayed as a much older man in the film than he was in the comic strip.

=== Singh Brotherhood ===
The film features several elements from Lee Falk's first two Phantom stories, The Singh Brotherhood and The Sky Band. The Singh Brotherhood was rechristened to the Sengh Brotherhood (the name of the brotherhood was changed from Singh to Sengh in the film, to avoid offending people named Singh) in Paramount's 1996 film Phantom. Their leader, Kabai Sengh, was played by Cary-Hiroyuki Tagawa. The Sengh Brotherhood is a fraternity of pirates, who are held to be the killers of the first Phantom's father.

=== Sky Band ===
Catherine Zeta-Jones plays Sala, leader of the Sky Band, a group of female criminal air pirates.
