= The Phantom (serial) =

1943 film by B. Reeves Eason

- DVD cover art
- Directed by: B. Reeves Eason
- Written by: Morgan Cox; Victor McLeod; Leslie Swabacker; Sherman L. Lowe; Lee Falk (character); Ray Moore (character)
- Produced by: Rudolph C. Flothow
- Starring: Tom Tyler; Jeanne Bates
- Narrated by: Knox Manning
- Cinematography: James S. Brown Jr.
- Edited by: Henry Adams; Dwight Caldwell
- Music by: Lee Zahler
- Color process: Black and white
- Production company: Columbia Pictures
- Distributed by: Columbia Pictures
- Release date: December 24, 1943
- Running time: 15 chapters (299 min)
- Country: United States
- Language: English

The Phantom, Chapter 1, The Sign of the Skull

The Phantom is a 1943 15-chapter cliffhanger superhero serial, produced by Rudolph C. Flothow, directed by B. Reeves Eason, and starring Tom Tyler in the title role. It is based on Lee Falk's comic strip The Phantom, first syndicated to newspapers in 1936 by King Features Syndicate. The serial also features Jeanne Bates as the Phantom's girlfriend Diana Palmer, and Ace the Wonder Dog as the Phantom's trusted German shepherd Devil (who is a wolf in the original comic strip).

== Plot summary ==
Professor Davidson plans an expedition to find the Lost City of Zoloz. The location of the city is contained on seven pieces of ivory, three of which Davidson already possesses. Doctor Bremmer, however, intends to find the lost city and use it as a secret airbase for his unnamed country. To remove him as an obstacle, he kills The Phantom, only for his recently returned son, Geoffrey Prescott, to inherit the family identity and take over the mantle of The Phantom.

Three of the remaining ivory pieces are owned by Singapore Smith, who initially steals Davidson's pieces. The seventh, and most important, piece is missing at first but turns up in the possession of Tartar (which The Phantom acquires by wrestling Tartar's pet gorilla).

== Cast ==
- Tom Tyler as Geoffrey Prescott/The Phantom
- Jeanne Bates as Diana Palmer
- Ernie Adams as Rusty Fenton
- John Bagni as Moku
- Frank Shannon as Prof. Davidson
- Kenneth MacDonald as Dr. Max Bremmer
- Joe Devlin as Singapore Smith
- Sam Flint as Phantom's father (uncredited)
- Al Ferguson as Thug (uncredited)

== Production ==
Like most serials, The Phantom had a low budget. Most of the serial was filmed in the Hollywood hills, which doubled as the African jungle.

For the serial, the Phantom's real name is Geoffrey Prescott. In the comic strip, his real name had not yet been introduced. The Phantom's real name was eventually introduced into the comic strip as Kit Walker. The Phantom tells Singapore Smith to call him "Walker" when he covers his costume with a hat, dark glasses, and an overcoat so he can enter civilization unobtrusively.

== Release ==
The serial was released as a double-disc DVD by VCI Video in 2001 (reusing the cover box art from their previous VHS release). It featured a commentary track by writer Max Allan Collins (for Chapter One only), as well as other special features, including actor bios, photo gallery, and comic book art gallery.

In 2005 a different DVD edition was released exclusively in Australia. Its special feature is an hour-long conversation between Frew Publications editor-in-chief Jim Shepherd and film historian James Sherlock about the history of the Phantom comic and its various screen adaptations. This was dubbed over the first three chapters of the serial in place of a commentary track.

Much of the dialogue of Chapter 11 had to be re-dubbed by new actors, because the original soundtrack-on-film negative had been damaged by the ravages of time.

== Critical reception ==
According to Jim Harmon and Donald F. Glut: "Unquestionably, The Phantom was one of Columbia's better serials...a task in casting, settings, and mood totally missing in such disasters as Batman from the same studio". In a 2018 retrospective, Martin Pasko contended that "The Phantom has all the problems most serials - Columbia's in particular - did: an implausible script riddled with inane, unplayable dialogue; wretchedly wooden acting; and a budget that rendered ludicrous any attempt to stage believable, much less spectacular, action by today's standards".

Cline wrote that Tyler's characterization, in his last serial role, was more vivid than that in Adventures of Captain Marvel but slightly less memorable. He added that Tyler had an "almost uncanny" resemblance to the comic strip character. However, Pasko said that he "seems old beyond his years, and not at all the vigorous young man who could plausibly do what the script demands of him". Harmon and Glut described him as wooden in his speech and movements, "the Gary Cooper of B films".

Phantom creator Lee Falk disliked the serial, commenting that "it looks like it was shot in a phone booth".

== Attempted sequel ==
In 1955 Columbia Pictures started filming a sequel to The Phantom, this time with John Hart in the lead role (Tom Tyler had died in 1954). The serial was well into production when producer Sam Katzman discovered that Columbia's rights to the character had expired, and owner King Features was unwilling to renew them. Katzman hastily transformed Return of the Phantom into The Adventures of Captain Africa. Despite the legal issues, The Adventures of Captain Africa incorporated a considerable amount of stock footage from the original Phantom series, including footage of Tyler in costume as the Phantom.

== Chapter titles ==
1. The Sign of the Skull
2. The Man Who Never Dies
3. A Traitor's Code
4. The Seat of Judgment
5. The Ghost Who Walks
6. Jungle Whispers
7. The Mystery Well
8. In Quest of the Keys
9. The Fire Princess
10. The Chamber of Death
11. The Emerald Key
12. The Fangs of the Beast
13. The Road to Zoloz
14. The Lost City
15. Peace in the Jungle

_{Source:}
