= The Ghost Who Walks =

The Ghost Who Walks may refer to:

- The Ghost Who Walks (album), a 2010 album by Karen Elson
  - "The Ghost Who Walks", its title track
- The Ghost Who Walks (film), a 2019 American action film directed by Cody Stokes
- Phantom (character), also known as "The Ghost Who Walks", a fictional superhero
  - The Story of the Phantom: The Ghost Who Walks, a 1973 novel written by Lee Falk, based on The Phantom
