= Phantom novels =

Cover to The Story of the Phantom: The Ghost Who Walks, (1972) drawn by George Wilson for Avon Books.

Lee Falk's comic strip character The Phantom has also appeared in several novels and short stories.

== Big Little Books ==
The first attempt at non-comic strip Phantom stories, were published by Whitman Publishing Company as Big Little Books, which featured illustrated pulp-adaptations of a few comic strip stories by Lee Falk and Ray Moore. The first Big Little Book with the Phantom was published in 1936, and the last in 1947.

The books published were:

1. The Phantom
2. The Phantom & the Sign of the Skull
3. The Phantom & Desert Justice
4. The Return of the Phantom
5. The Phantom & the Sky Pirates
6. The Phantom & the Girl of Mystery

== Son of the Phantom ==
The first novel featuring The Phantom was called The Son of the Phantom, and was first published in 1944 by Whitman Publishing Company. The novel was written by Dale Robertson and was based on a Sunday strip story called "The Childhood of the Phantom". The story is about the current Phantom's childhood in the jungle, his education in America, the death of his mother Maude, and his return to the Deep Woods to take up on the mantle of the Phantom from his dying father. The book has become a highly sought collectible among fans of the character.

== The Avon Publications series ==
Avon Publications in the U.S. put out 15 books based on Lee Falk's stories. These ran from 1972 to 1975, and were written by Lee Falk or a ghost writer. Ron Goulart, using the pseudonym of Frank S. Shawn, later remarked that Falk originally asked Alfred Bester, who had previously worked on the Phantom comic strip when Falk served in the army, to ghost-write a few novels. Bester was not interested, and recommended Goulart for Falk. The covers for the novels were done by George Wilson, previously known for his work on US Phantom comic books. Many of the books were translated into many foreign languages. The complete list of books is:

1. The Story of the Phantom: The Ghost Who Walks 1972, Lee Falk
2. The Slave Market of Mucar 1972, Basil Copper
3. The Scorpia Menace 1972, Basil Copper
4. The Veiled Lady 1973, Frank S. Shawn
5. The Golden Circle 1973, Frank S. Shawn
6. The Mysterious Ambassador 1973, Lee Falk
7. The Mystery of the Sea Horse 1973, Frank S. Shawn
8. The Hydra Monster 1973, Frank S. Shawn
9. Killer's Town 1973, Lee Falk
10. The Goggle-Eyed Pirates 1974, Frank S. Shawn
11. The Swamp Rats 1974, Frank S. Shawn
12. The Vampires & the Witch 1974, Lee Falk
13. The Island of Dogs 1975, Warren Shanahan
14. The Assassins 1975, Carson Bingham
15. The Curse of the Two-Headed Bull 1975, Lee Falk (original story) and Carson Bingham (novelization)

Some of the Avon books were made into audiobooks in Norway and Sweden in 2006. However, the books were heavily edited to fit each book on two CDs. Sometimes, entire subplots were taken out.

== Movie adaptation ==
In 1996, a novel adaptation of The Phantom movie, which starred Billy Zane, was published. It was written by Rob MacGregor, whose former work with writing Indiana Jones novels suited the tone of the movie well. The novel format allowed more fleshed out characters, and a slower pacing than the film. The book also included many scenes which ended up on the cutting-room floor in the film version, and a more detailed presentation of the Phantom's origin.

== Moonstone Books ==
In 2007, Moonstone Books released The Phantom Chronicles, a collection of short stories written by authors Mike Bullock, Ron Fortier, Jim Alexander, David Michelinie, Craig Shaw Gardner, CJ Henderson, Clay and Susan Griffith, Will Murray, Mike Oliveri, Nancy Kilpatrick, Ed Rhoades, David Bishop, Grant Suave, Trina Robbins, Richard Dean Starr, Dan Wickline and Martin Powell.

The book was released in both a softcover and limited hardcover edition.
