= The Last Phantom =

Comic series by Scott Beatty and Eduardo Ferigato

Publication information
- Publisher: Dynamite Entertainment
- Schedule: Monthly
- Format: Limited series
- Genre: Adventure; Superhero
- Publication date: August 2010 – November 2011
- No. of issues: 13
- Main character: The Phantom

Creative team
- Written by: Scott Beatty
- Artist: Eduardo Ferigato
- Letterer: Simon Bowland
- Colorist: Vinicius Andrade

Collected editions
- The Last Phantom Vol. 1: ISBN 978-1606902011
- The Last Phantom Vol. 2: ISBN 978-1606902486

The Last Phantom is a comic book series published by Dynamite Entertainment, inspired by Lee Falk's The Phantom. It is a modern reboot of the classic character written by Scott Beatty and drawn by Eduardo Ferigato, with covers painted by Alex Ross.

== Plot ==
Kit Walker, the twenty-first in a line of heroes originated in 1536, has forsaken his family legacy of becoming the Phantom, a masked vigilante defending the innocent and tirelessly fighting evil all over the world. Walker has instead chosen to start the charitable organization Walkabout, and has settled down with his wife and his son. When Walker's friend and employee Peter Quisling orchestrates the murder of his family, Kit has no other choice than to take up the mantle of the Phantom once again to avenge his loved ones and bring justice to the world.

Totally, 12 issues and 1 Annual were released, but ended in a cliffhanger with no issues thereafter. The story follows current Phantom as well as his father in flashbacks, both remaining incomplete.

== Collected editions ==
Vol. #	Title	Material collected	Pages	Publication date	ISBN
1	Ghost Walk	The Last Phantom #1–6	144	March 2011	978-1606902011
2	Jungle Rules	The Last Phantom #7–12 and The Last Phantom Annual #1	170	May 2012	978-1606902486
