= Guran =

Publication information
- Publisher: King Features Syndicate, Egmont; Frew; Moonstone and many others
- Created by: Lee Falk

In-story information
- Supporting character of: Phantom

Guran is a character from the comic strip The Phantom. Guran is the best friend of the main character, Phantom.

== Character synopsis ==
According to Lee Falk's novel The Story of the Phantom: The Ghost Who Walks, Guran is ten years older than Kit Walker (a.k.a. The Phantom). The two grew up together in the deep woods of Bangalla, where Guran taught the Phantom the ways of the Bandar tribe. Guran was the Phantom's best man when he married his girlfriend since boyhood, Diana Palmer. Guran followed Kit to Clarksdale, Mississippi, where Kit studied while living with his aunt and uncle, Bessie and Sid, leaving him to become the first of the shy, isolated Bandar pigmies to learn how to read and write. He also brought Kit the message about Kit's dying father, the 20th Phantom, causing the 20-year-old college student to leave America to return to the Skull Cave, Bangalla, where he took up the mantle of the Phantom. Known for his characteristic clothing, he is usually seen wearing a special hat made of either blades of grass or wood. He is also the medicine man of the Bandar, and has saved the Phantom's life on a few occasions due to his knowledge of ancient Bangallan medicine, as well as modern western medicine.

=== Family ===
Guran is the son of the former chief of the Bandar tribe, leaving him to take over the title from his father (it is not known whether his father died or retired from the position). His ancestors, who have accompanied various Phantoms on adventures, are similar in appearance and are all named with the suffix -uran.

Guran has a son from a former relationship, Timo, the black sheep of the family. Timo was once was a part of the team who tried to steal the Phantom's treasure from the Skull Cave.

== Other media ==
- In the Phantom 2040 animated series, Guran's grandson, also named Guran, was the closest friend of the 23rd Phantom, and acted as a mentor to the 24th. He was voiced by J.D. Hall.
- A character called Guran had cameo appearances in some episodes of Defenders of the Earth, which featured Flash Gordon, The Phantom, and Mandrake the Magician. However, as the series took place in the future, it is presumed to be one of Guran's descendants.
- In the 1996 The Phantom film, Guran makes a brief appearance played by Radmar Agana Jao. In this version he is much younger than the Phantom, and is portrayed as an Asian, rather than African as he is in the comics. He also wears a turban and a more traditional set of clothing, rather than his strange hat and unique dress sense in the comic.
- In the 1943 Phantom movie serial, a character named Moko is clearly inspired by Guran, and serves as the Phantom's assistant and helper throughout the film.
- In the 2010 SyFy miniseries, Guran is recast as an educated native woman (Sandrine Holt) of the Bengalla jungle who eventually befriends Kit Walker the 22nd (Ryan Carnes) the son of the 21st Phantom (Kit Walker the 21st) and Diane Walker.
