= The Phantom (miniseries) =

- Countries of origin: United States; Canada
- No. of episodes: 2

Production
- Running time: 180 minutes

Original release
- Network: The Movie Network
- Release: December 2009 – December 2009
- Network: Syfy
- Release: June 20, 2010

The Phantom is a 2009 television miniseries inspired by Lee Falk's comic strip of the same name, and directed by Paolo Barzman. It first aired on The Movie Network and then on Syfy in June 2010. It stars Ryan Carnes as Kit Walker, the 22nd Phantom, and is produced by RHI Entertainment and Muse Entertainment.

== Plot ==
Law student and parkour traceur Chris Moore is shocked to learn that he was adopted and that he is actually the son of The Phantom, a legendary crime-fighter and defender of the innocent, a role that has been passed down from father to son in the Walker line for centuries after the 1st Phantom's father was murdered by pirates. Shortly afterwards, Chris's adoptive parents are murdered by hired assassins of the Singh Brotherhood, the long-time enemies of the Phantom for over five centuries. He is sought out by Bpaa Thap (Jungle Patrol), the group founded by the 1st Phantom which has evolved into an international covert intelligence and law enforcement agency headquartered in the jungles of Bangalla (the fictional small island nation in the Indonesian archipelago). The Bpaa Thap team consists of a bunch of scientists; various paramilitary specialists; Director of Field Operations and close ally of the Walkers, Abel Vandermaark; and Guran, a native Bangalla woman who quickly befriends Kit. Now going by his birth name of Kit Walker, he begins training to become an expert in martial arts and combat, to emerge as the 22nd Phantom to battle evil.

He quickly encounters the Singh Brotherhood, now led by the murderous and arrogant Rhatib Singh. Wearing an updated Phantom uniform that gives him added strength and speed, Kit's first mission is to stop Singh and figure out the Singh Brotherhood's plans for a new technology they have developed named "Flicker" (which enables them to brainwash people through specially planted cable TV set-top boxes to complete specific tasks). However, the task is not so easy as there is a mole in the Phantom team, and the Singh Brotherhood attempts to assassinate the police detective father of Kit's new love, Renny. Kit eventually finds and eliminates the facility which handles the broadcasts, but not before the Brotherhood transmits the necessary commands to the people needed to make their master plan a success. Kit races against time to stop brainwashed people (including a press photographer, a Secret Service agent and an EMT) from assassinating a diplomat who has an uncanny ability to bring nations to peace, and the only man who can do so to the Middle East and whose death would spark wars (and thereby increase the Brotherhood's revenue).

Kit manages to save the diplomat as the Phantom, and in the wake of this, Rhatib Singh orders the mole in the Phantom team (who has been holding Renny and her father at gunpoint to force the Phantom to allow the diplomat to be murdered) to kill them, but the team manages to subdue the mole. Immediately after the failure is revealed, Singh is executed by the other board members of the Brotherhood for incompetence. Finally, Kit confronts Vandermaark, who it turns out is a morally questionable man with a streak of cruelty and who deliberately tipped off the Brotherhood to Kit's foster parents' location in order to entice Kit to become the Phantom. Vandermaark attempts to convince Kit to put the past behind him, but Kit begins to walk away from him, thereby banishing him from the Phantom team. Vandermaark screams that he won't let Kit destroy what the previous Phantom and he had built and throws a grenade, which Kit shoots in mid-air, making it explode in Vandermaark's face. In the epilogue, the Singh Brotherhood introduces its new chairman; a very disfigured Vandermaark who survived the grenade explosion, while at the Skull Cave in Bangalla, Kit bids farewell and kisses Renny, finally becoming a couple. As Renny departs for New York to help her father recover, Guran smilingly reminds Kit that one of the Phantom's most sacred duties is to produce an heir.

== Cast ==
- Ryan Carnes as Chris Moore/Kit Walker– the 22nd Phantom
- Cameron Goodman as Renny Davidson – Kit's girlfriend and paramedic.
- Jean Marchand as Abel Vandermaark – Kit's mentor and one of the Walkers' oldest allies, although Kit becomes suspicious of his true intentions.
- Sandrine Holt as Guran – the Phantom's close friend and advisor
- Isabella Rossellini as Dr. Bella Lithia
- Ron Lea as Detective Sean Davidson – Renny's father.
- Cas Anvar as Rhatib Singh – head of the Singh Brotherhood.
- Ivan Smith as Dr. Deepak Baboor – director of Bpaa Thap.

== Production ==
In July 2008, screenwriter Daniel Knauf said that he and his son and collaborator Charles Knauf had completed a four-hour TV-movie script for SCI FI Channel, later renamed Syfy, starring the 22nd Phantom.

In 2009, Sci Fi Channel formally ordered a 4-hour mini-series in two parts, also serving as a backdoor pilot. It is produced by Muse Entertainment and RHI Entertainment, with Paolo Barzman directing. The series was shot in New York City, Costa Rica and Montreal.

The goal of the writers was to stay faithful to the source material while updating it for the screen, adding elements of science fiction rarely seen in the comic. The character's costume was updated, with the Knaufs wanting to stay faithful to the old look of the Phantom while making it more practical for the screen.

== Release ==
The two-part mini-series, a total of three hours, premiered in Canada on The Movie Network in December 2009 and later aired on Syfy in the US on June 20, 2010. The series was released on DVD and Blu-ray on September 7, 2010, from Vivendi Entertainment.
