= Diana Palmer =

Diana Palmer may refer to:

- Diana Palmer (author), pseudonym of the American romantic novelist Susan Spaeth Kyle
- Diana Palmer (The Phantom), a character in the American comic strip The Phantom
