= Phantom 2040 =

- Poster
- Genre: Action/Adventure; Science fiction Superhero fiction Drama; Crime fiction
- Created by: Lee Falk with David J. Corbett; Judith and Garfield Reeves-Stevens
- Developed by: Hearst Corporation; Minos S.A. France 3
- Written by: Judith and Garfield Reeves-Stevens; Brynne Chandler; Richard Merwin; Shari Goodhartz
- Directed by: Vincent Bassols; Bertrand Tager Kagan; Michael Kaweski; Michel Lyman; Stu Rosen
- Starring: Scott Valentine; J.D. Hall; Leah Remini; Ron Perlman; Margot Kidder; Jeff Bennett; Mark Hamill
- Theme music composer: Larry Brown; Steve Sexton
- Composers: Larry Brown; Gerald O'Brien
- Countries of origin: France; United States
- No. of episodes: 35

Production
- Running time: 25 minutes
- Production company: Hearst Entertainment

Original release
- Network: Syndication
- Release: September 18, 1994 – March 3, 1996

Phantom 2040 is an animated series that is loosely based on the comic strip superhero The Phantom, created by Lee Falk. The central character of the series is said to be the 24th Phantom. It was aired from September 18, 1994 to March 3, 1996 in syndication.

== Story ==
"The year is 2040. The place is Metropia. Here, a new hero prepares for action. The man who cannot die. The ghost who walks. The Phantom. The Phantom's pledge: To fight evil and injustice wherever they may be found. In this future world, in this dying city with the fate of the earth and all humanity in the balance. The Phantom is there!"

— opening narration.

It is the year 2040, all environmental disasters and the economic Resource Wars from the early 21st century have decimated the fragile ecosystem balance of an Earth once teeming with life. Everywhere, the privileged and wealthy continue to thrive in expensive real estate developments that tower above the suffering masses. The victims of Earth's misfortune have been forced to subsist on scavenged refuse from the past on the mangled streets of forlorn city-states.

In Metropia (once known as New York City), the largest and most powerful of the city-states, the powerful robotics manufacturing corporation Maximum Inc. has slowly shaped a cold, steely urban center, consisting of huge, residential towers intertwined with TubeTrain tunnels. Maximum's robotic "biots" (Biological Optical Transputer System) have replaced enormous amounts of human labor, and the corporation is illegally producing prohibited combat biots to form Maximum's private underground army. Under this guise of efficient progress, Maximum has its own plans for the future, which it refers to as the Maximum Era. Through the construction of the fortress of Cyberville, an immense survival shelter where only the wealthiest and most elite humans will retreat, and the take over of Metropia by means of its biot armies, its plans ultimately involve the dark path of decline and extinction as the culminating result of man's prior errors and efforts, once Earth finally succumbs to its slowly deteriorating state.

The only hope for the survival of humanity is the Ghost Jungle — thousands of square miles of mutated vegetation that may be the planet's salvation. This secret source of life is submerged beneath Metropia, unseen by most. College student Kit Walker Jr. is chosen by fate to save the world, donning the black mask and purple suit of his people's savior, the 24th Phantom.

The role of the Phantom has been passed on from father to son since the 16th century, leading the world to believe that the Phantom is a single immortal individual. Kit, the 24th in the line, is young, unsure, and inexperienced, but he finds within him the courage and might to battle the evil that threatens to destroy the Earth.

== Cast and characters ==
Phantom 2040's voice cast included Scott Valentine, Margot Kidder, Ron Perlman, Leah Remini, J.D. Hall, Alan Oppenheimer, Richard Lynch and Jeff Bennett - while Mark Hamill, Debbie Harry, Rob Paulsen and Paul Williams had recurring roles.

- Kit Walker, Jr. – The 24th Phantom, Kit was not trained for the role like his ancestors were. His father died under mysterious circumstances when he was only a baby, and he grew up not knowing about his heritage. When Guran tells him about the Phantom on his eighteenth birthday, he is initially disbelieving but takes on the role with increasing conviction. His equipment includes optical camouflage for invisibility, a wristband that contains a powerful computer ("analytical"), and another that contains a smart inductance rope. He has several vehicles, including a nimble airborne Hypercycle, a cloaking multi-passenger cruiser, and an upgraded 1999 Mustang named "Hero", after the 21st Phantom's horse. After defeating Maximum Inc, he looks towards a long vacation, until the day the Phantom is needed again. Voiced by Scott Valentine.
- Guran – Kit's mentor, whose family have been aiding the Phantom for generations. Together with Jack Archer, Guran instructs the Phantom in combat, morality, and life itself, and is frequently seen reciting insightful "old jungle sayings" to Kit and others. After the 23rd Phantom's death, Guran blamed himself, and consumed in his sadness and self-hatred he became the legendary Shadow Panther until he was freed from his mourning forever by Kit Walker Jr. Voiced by J. D. Hall.
- Jack Archer – A scientist and professor in biology at Kit's university. After Kit dons the identity of the Phantom, Archer takes only a short time to deduce that they are the same and becomes one of the few who know the Phantom's true identity. Together with Guran, Archer takes on the role of Kit's mentor, particularly in scientific and contemporary parts of his education. Later on, (due to his wishes to work for the greater good like Kit), opens a small Detective agency like his family before him. Voiced by Alan Oppenheimer.
- "Sparks" (Daniel Aguilar) – A young, orphaned cyber-surfer who is rescued by Kit after Maximum mistakes Sparks as the Phantom. Sparks is unofficially adopted into the Phantom's lair, and assists in the technological parts of their endeavors. When he was three, his parents, Esteban and María, were kidnapped by Maximum and cruelly used as the mental tissue for the biomechanical "living building" Project Gauntlet, Cyberville's security system. Voiced by Pamela Adlon.
- Sagan Cruz – A Metropian policewoman or "Enforcer", who is attracted to Kit but was initially unaware of his dual identity, and was skeptical about the Phantom's motives. She later figures out his secret and eventually becomes Kit's love interest and partner. She has a genetically engineered police dog named D.V.L. (a reference to the 21st Phantom's wolf, Devil) and in combat dons a well-armored Enforcer suit. Voiced by Leah Remini.
- Heloise Walker – Kit's only living relative, Heloise is the daughter of the 21st Phantom, the sister of the 22nd Phantom, the aunt of the 23rd Phantom, and the great-aunt of Kit Walker, Jr. – The 24th Phantom. She kept the truth from Kit, hoping he could lead a normal life, but accepts Kit's choice to become the 24th Phantom and assists him in his plans to stop Maximum Inc. Voiced by Carrie Snodgress.
- Rebecca Madison – The series villain, chairperson of Maximum Inc. and widow of Maxwell Madison Sr., the 23rd Phantom's killer. Rebecca plans to construct Cyberville, an impenetrable technological fortress where the select wealthy and elite may seek refuge when the Earth begins to deteriorate (something Rebecca's underground biot army will ensure takes place relatively soon), but her plans of domination are frequently being foiled by the Phantom. Despite her evil ways, she does have some redeeming qualities, such as wishing to know that her son is safe before evacuating from an attack, as well as Kit suggesting she is a very lonely woman. Other than Graft and her son, Maxwell Madison Jr., no other humans are employed by Maximum, which has its own biots perform all labor. In the end, with all of her crimes revealed to the world, she is quickly arrested and sent to prison. Voiced by Margot Kidder.
- Maxwell Madison Jr. – Rebecca's psychopathic son, whose intelligence is belied by his laziness and outward disinterest in almost everything. When he does have an opinion on something, he presents it as coming from his cat, Charles Baudelaire. He is psychologically disturbed with the disorders being rooted in the loss of his father at such an early age. His cat, perhaps the last remaining symbol of his father's love for him, is his only and most trusted friend. In the end, after Rebecca is arrested both he and his cat, are sent to a mental asylum, or as Cruz put it, a "padded prison". Voiced by Jeff Bennett.
- Hubert Graft – Rebecca Madison's Chief of Security and main enforcer, a cyborg. He was formerly an environmentalist who turned and fought against Maximum to protect the Amazon rainforest, before losing his whole body below the shoulders in combat. Maximum rebuilt Graft's body using biot parts, giving Rebecca Madison complete control over Graft's life. Graft's biot torso can be disconnected (a painful process) at the hip and integrated into other robotic systems over which Graft has complete control, most commonly the Urban Combat Biot Walker, a ten-foot steel exoskeleton armed with lasers and claws. Despite this, he still has a desire to protect nature and will work with the Phantom if a bigger threat hits it. Several times the Phantom asks if he would want to escape Maximum's clutches, but he always turns this offer down. He also is against harming children, even if that child trespassed and destroyed invaluable company technology. In the end, after Maximum Inc is defeated, he is mentioned to have been sent to a halfway house. Voiced by Ron Perlman in the first season, and Richard Lynch in the second.
- Doctor Jak – A cynical sensationalist TV yellow journalist who reports the Phantom's activities with a negative spin. His arrogance and vanity bring him to believe that rather than being merely a reporter of news, he "is the news", and therefore anything he does not see (such as purposely covering his eye when it is revealed the Phantom was being framed) is not the news. In "Matter Over Mind", it is discovered that after Jak's wife perished in the Grand Central Station crash, he attempted an illegal operation to integrate an analytical computer into his mind, but the operation was interrupted and the analytical program thought lost. Dr. Jak was left part-biot, with sensory implants on his head and a multi-purpose eyepiece which he uses to film his news program, The Dr. Jak Show. His character and how he criminalizes the Phantom are comparable to J. Jonah Jameson of Spider-Man. Voiced by Mark Hamill.
- Mr. Cairo – A mysterious information broker who only appears in holographic transmissions and who deals with both the Phantom and Maximum Inc. Early on, he discovers the Phantom's true identity but chooses to withhold the information from Rebecca Madison despite the enormous reward being offered. He is later revealed to actually be the sentient analytical program separated from Dr. Jak's consciousness, but he decides not to rejoin Dr. Jak's mind and instead stays on to loyally assist the Phantom, though meets his end when Max Jr. shuts down the power with him still in it, deleting him. Voiced by Paul Williams.
- Sean One – The first human born in outer space and founder and leader of the Free Orbital Movement, Sean One seeks independence for his Orbital colonies. An arrogant and abnormally tall man, he resorts to espionage and terrorist attacks to achieve his ends and is unable to walk by himself while in the presence of gravity. He is revered among the Orbitals' inhabitants in an almost god-like way and is extremely apathetic towards whom he calls the "gravity-slaves" of Earth. He is defeated when he publicly announced his plan to rig the votes to make the Orbital Colonies independent, as well as attempting to kill Vaingloria. Voiced by Rob Paulsen.
- Gorda – A morbidly obese crime lord and smuggler from Australia who is unable to move by herself and has an army of strong, red-tinted biots under her command. She refers to herself in virtual camera system and has a well-armed robotic kangaroo as her sole companion. In the end, she is arrested and transported back to Australia to await trial. Voiced by Paddi Edwards.
- Heisenberg – A shape-shifting fractal biot built by Max Madison Jr. using nanites grown in space by Sean One, named by Maxwell after the German physicist Werner Heisenberg. Heisenberg is the first stable fractal biot created by Maximum and is controlled by Maxwell using a separate remote brain which must be carried around in a case. Heisenberg is forced to impersonate the Phantom and succeeds in criminalizing him with the help of Dr. Jak, but after a confrontation with the Phantom, Maxwell loses the remote brain and hence control of Heisenberg. Afterward, the fractal biot gains independence and a form of sentience, dons a wide-brimmed hat and trench coat, and seeks answers for his past, remembering nothing of his creation other than his name. He meets a wise street saxophonist named Betty, and after deciding to take his own path, becomes a "teacher" to biots everywhere, helping them to be free from their human owners and become self-aware. Heisenberg eventually joins the Phantom and becomes a close companion to Pavlova, Dr. Jak's assistant. Voiced by Rob Paulsen.
- Pavlova - Dr. Jak's personal biot assistant, distinguishable by red symbols on her face. Pavlova sometimes questions the honesty and morality of Jak's news uploads, but always has her memory wiped by Jak afterward (a task he does somewhat reluctantly). Nicknamed "Pav" by Jak, the reporter treats her as his friend and sometimes even in a joking, romantic way, because Pavlova was named after Jak's late wife. Pavlova also befriends Heisenberg, who takes an interest in her. She ultimately tells Jak "I will program myself from now on", at which later Jak laments, "You just had to be your own person, just like her", referring to Pav's namesake. Voiced by Liz Georges.
- Vaingloria – A popular starlet singer trained by Maximum Inc. to brainwash the public. It is known that Rebecca Madison found her as a street urchin and offered her food, shelter, and fame in exchange for her services for Maximum. Rebecca had her fitted with retractable mirrors which can focus light to such a strength that looking at the mirrors can overload the mind's senses, effectively hypnotizing the public into adoring her and on Maximum's orders using them to completely brainwash certain people (it can be assumed that the mirrors are difficult to control with precision, as Vaingloria once accidentally sent a victim into a coma). Vaingloria reluctantly takes part in several of Maximum's plots and becomes particularly close to Graft, who (somewhat) reciprocates. He ultimately hardwires her mirrors so that she can use them on her own. Voiced by Deborah Harry.
- Betty – A wise street saxophonist who becomes Heisenberg's best friend and companion. She is seen to be aware of everything around her and frequently relating life to the blues. She carries a saxophone that was the property of former U.S. president Bill Clinton. Voiced by Iona Morris.
- Maxwell Madison Sr. – Rebecca's deceased husband, who was killed along with the 23rd Phantom in a toxic train wreck. Rebecca captures his brainwaves and stores them in an enormous computer, and is constantly seeking a stable way to transfer them into a biot or preferably a living body to effectively resurrect Maxwell Madison Sr. He was regarded as a very dangerous and power-hungry man when he was alive and in control of Maximum, Inc, but it is discovered that his plans for the world were very ecologically beneficial and that his ambitious wife Rebecca sabotaged his plans in favor of greedy, selfish world domination. Voiced by Jeff Bennett.

== Development ==
The show was developed for television by executive producer David J. Corbett and executive story editors Judith and Garfield Reeves-Stevens. In addition to story-editing both seasons, the Reeves-Stevens devised the show's writers' bible, and scripted numerous episodes, including the two-part pilot (Generation Unto Generation). Other key writers on the show included Brynne Chandler and Michael Reaves.

The unusual character designs were the distinctive work of Peter Chung, creator of Æon Flux.

The art director/conceptual designer on the show was Thom Schillinger, who created all of the background designs and technical concept designs to complement Peter Chung's distinctively elongated character design.

The show debuted in 1994 to rave reviews, though it survived only 35 episodes before it was relegated to weekend repeats in 1996. Along with action sequences, stories focused on intelligent plotting and character development, winning the series praise for its subtle teaching of such values as individuality, freedom and the volatility of humanity.

Along with Andrea Romano's equally pioneering work on Batman: The Animated Series, Stu Rosen's voice direction on Phantom 2040 had a lasting impact on animated adventure television. Romano and Rosen cast accomplished dramatic actors and introduced a new level of maturity and complexity to their show's vocal performances that set the standard for all TV animation that followed.

== Episodes ==
=== Season 1 ===
No. overall	No. in season	Title	Written by	Original release date	Prod. code
1	1	"Generation Unto Generation (Part One)"	Judith and Garfield Reeves-Stevens	September 18, 1994	4308-052
Kit Walker Jr., a student at Metropia University, meets his father's old friend, Guran, who informs him of his heritage and tries to convince him to become the next Phantom.
2	2	"Generation Unto Generation (Part Two)"	Judith and Garfield Reeves-Stevens	September 25, 1994	4308-053
Kit's first heroic act as the Phantom is to stop Maximum Inc. from using a virtual reality game to brainwash young citizens into rioting.
3	3	"The Sum of the Parts"	Judith and Garfield Reeves-Stevens	October 2, 1994	4308-018
Maxwell Madison Jr. creates the first stable "fractal biot", a shapeshifting automaton who is ordered by Maximum to impersonate the Phantom and frame him for a series of armed robberies. Meanwhile, Jack Archer, one of Kit's professors, discovers Kit's true identity.
4	4	"Fire and I.C.E."	Judith and Garfield Reeves-Stevens	October 9, 1994	4308-008
The Phantom and Guran hack into a virtual reality projection of Cyberville, Rebecca Madison's planned fortress. Unbeknownst to them, Graft has found a way to pinpoint the location of the Skull Lair by tracking their virtual signal. However, an orphaned teenage cyber-surfer nicknamed Sparks also finds a way to penetrate Maximum's system, and Graft mistakes him for the Phantom.
5	5	"Reflections of Glory"	Judith and Garfield Reeves-Stevens	October 16, 1994	4308-040
Maximum's trained starlet singer, Vaingloria, uses her hypnotic mirrors to brainwash the children of City Councillors in a bid by Rebecca Madison to rig the vote on Cyberville. Kit and Enforcer Sagan Cruz are forced to cut their date short as the Phantom takes action against Maximum's plot.
6	6	"Shadows from the Past"	Judith and Garfield Reeves-Stevens	October 23, 1994	4308-016
Queen Nia, deposed heir to the throne of Egypt, tracks down the Phantom to seek revenge for his unification of Africa long ago, but Guran is hit by her poisonous darts in the Phantom's place. Delusional and lost in the Ghost Jungle, Guran's babblings reveal more about the Sector Zero train wreck, but the Phantom must find him before Nia does. And then there's the Shadow Panther . . .
7	7	"The Good Mark"	Judith and Garfield Reeves-Stevens	October 30, 1994	4308-004
Guran presents Kit with the Phantom's other ring, called the Good Mark, while Graft lures the Phantom into a trap using fake data files regarding the Sector Zero incident. But when Graft discovers that Rebecca is hiding the real Sector Zero files, he steals them in an attempt to loosen Rebecca's iron grip over him. Enforcer Cruz works with the Phantom for the first time, and the Phantom gives her a medallion marked with the Good Mark in return.
8	8	"The Ghost in the Machine"	Brynne Stephens	November 6, 1994	4308-017
Rebecca succeeds in partially reviving Maxwell Madison Sr. in a biot's body, but unable to remember his death, Maxwell kidnaps his son and sets out to regain his memories. The Phantom follows him to Sector Zero and discovers more about the Sector Zero wreck.
9	9	"Dark Orbit (Part One)"	Len Wein	November 13, 1994	4308-036
Sean One, with the aid of Australian crime boss Gorda, raids Maximum cargo ships to obtain chemicals needed for his Damocles Platform, a deadly orbital laser cannon he plans to use to force the Earth into recognizing the independence of the Orbital Colonies.
10	10	"Dark Orbit (Part Two)"	Brynne Stephens	November 20, 1994	4308-001
The Phantom teams up with Graft and Maxwell Jr. to stop Gorda and Sean One from firing the laser cannon on Damocles Platform at Metropia.
11	11	"The Biot in Red"	Judith and Garfield Reeves-Stevens	November 27, 1994	4308-033
Fleeing from the Phantom, Maxwell Jr. hides a vital data file stolen from Sean One, but the free fractal biot Heisenberg stumbles across it and seeks out the Phantom, discovering more about his self-awareness and complex emotions as he does so.
12	12	"The Gauntlet"	Marc Scott Zicree	December 4, 1994	4308-024
Sparks discovers the truth about what happened to his parents, while Guran and the Phantom investigate a dangerous new security system in Cyberville: a shape-shifting, sentient structure called Project Gauntlet.
13	13	"Three Into One"	Michael Reaves	December 13, 1994	4308-050
For seemingly no reason, three civilians become one linked, super-powered consciousness, and the Enforcers have no choice but to ask the Phantom to stop the trio from destroying Metropia. To do so, the Phantom must find out the truth about the experimental Triad project.
14	14	"Life Lessons"	Brynne Stephens	February 4, 1995	4308-014
Kit is shocked to discover that humans are masquerading as biots in an attempt to get work, but is shocked even more by the discovery of a hidden nuclear reactor in Cyberville, which is leaking radiation and hurting the disguised humans. The Phantom must team up with Heisenberg to stop the defective reactor before it melts down.
15	15	"The Magician"	Mel Gilden	February 11, 1995	4308-015
Sagan stumbles across records of a mysterious white-haired man who was friends with the Phantom in the time of Kit's father, and Graft will go to any lengths to find the strange "magician" before the Phantom can.
16	16	"Swifter, Higher, Faster"	J. Larry Carroll & David Barrett Carren	February 18, 1995	4308-012
While attempting to reconnect with his friends at the university, Kit runs across a plot by Maximum to test dangerous performance-enhancing nanobots on student athletes, and learns that one of his friends has become one of Maximum's test subjects.
17	17	"Lasers in the Jungle"	Shari Goodhartz	February 25, 1995	4308-029
Graft leads an armed raid on the Ghost Jungle to find the Phantom's hidden lair, and is forced to bring Vaingloria along with him. When Kit's plan to divert Graft from the skull lair goes awry, the Phantom must improvise to save his friends from the wrath of Maximum's biot army.
18	18	"Down the Line"	Craig Miller	April 29, 1995	4308-013
The Skull Lair receives a strange message from the future: the Phantom of 2157 pleads with the Phantom to break his pledge and kill Rebecca Madison, for the good of the world. Tension rises as Kit and his friends argue about whether to take the message's advice.
19	19	"Control Group"	Shari Goodhartz	September 2, 1995	4308-044
Rebecca Madison decides to test a new brainwave transfer method on Graft, causing the Phantom to stumble upon some of Graft's old memories, of his time as a soldier in the Resource Wars and his defiance of Maximum. Now, the Phantom must help Graft remember that he was once a hero to stop Rebecca from turning Metropia's new war memorial into a lethal plasma cannon.
20	20	"A Boy and his Cat"	Lydia C. Marano & Arthur Byron Cover	September 9, 1995	4308-047
Maxwell Jr. ends up trapped in virtual reality after his leisurely stroll through Maximum's defences leaves Rebecca fuming, and the Phantom must get him out before he unknowingly destroys Metropia with his indestructible, virtually-controlled army of combat biots.

=== Season 2 ===
No. overall	No. in season	Title	Written by	Original release date	Prod. code
21	1	"Rite of Passage"	Richard Merwin	September 16, 1995	4308-007
A recap of events in Season One, centered around the stories of the protagonists: Kit, Heloise, Sparks, Guran and Sagan with voiceover from Kit.
22	2	"The World is My Jungle"	Richard Merwin	September 23, 1995	4308-034
Part two of the recap of events in Season One, this time centered around the antagonists: Rebecca Madison, Graft, Maxwell Madison, Max Jr., again with voiceover from Kit.
23	3	"Sanctuary"	Story by : Judith and Garfield Reeves-Stevens; Teleplay by : Len Wein	September 30, 1995	4308-025
Queen Nia returns to the Ghost Jungle and brings with her a dangerous marksman, Gunnar, and together they capture Guran. But when Gunnar finds evidence of the presence of the fabled Shadow Panther in the jungle, he forces Nia to accompany him on his hunting quest, and the Phantom must intervene. Meanwhile, Rebecca Madison abandons Maxwell's beloved cat in the streets of Metropia in a bid to draw him out of virtual reality.
24	4	"The Ties That Bind"	Story by : Judith and Garfield Reeves-Stevens; Teleplay by : Brynne Stephens & Michael Reaves	October 7, 1995	4308-010
After Rebecca Madison succeeds in destroying Sean One's main orbital platform, the Phantom calls a hidden meeting with his scattered friends to plan their next move against Maximum, but the group is ambushed by Graft's biot army and Dr. Jak.
25	5	"The Woman in the Moon"	Sam Graham & Chris Hubbell	October 14, 1995	4308-037
As the Orbital Council prepares to vote on whether or not to declare independence from Earth, the Phantom travels to the orbital platforms to investigate a shipment of cloned human hands being sent to Sean One. Meanwhile, both Sean One and Maximum put opposing plans into motion to fix the independence vote in their favor.
26	6	"Matter Over Mind"	Marc Scott Zicree	October 21, 1995	4308-028
Sparks stumbles upon a formula for the toxic chemicals involved in the Sector Zero wreck, which triggers lost memories within Mr. Cairo. With the Phantom's help, he discovers more about his past, and his connection to Dr. Jak and the Sector Zero crash.
27	7	"The Sins of the Fathers (Part One)"	Judith and Garfield Reeves-Stevens	October 28, 1995	4308-032
Major revelations about Maxwell Sr.'s past and the Sector Zero crash are revealed, as Kit comes to question his father's actions. Rebecca finally succeeds in reviving Maxwell Sr., but not in the way she had intended.
28	8	"The Sins of the Fathers (Part Two)"	Judith and Garfield Reeves-Stevens	November 4, 1995	4308-030
The group returns to the Skull Cave in Bengala, Africa, and Kit decides he no longer wishes to be the Phantom. Unbeknownst to them, Rebecca Madison has unleashed her biot army in Metropia as Cyberville nears completion. The Phantom returns to Metropia for a final showdown with Maximum Inc.
29	9	"The Sacrifice (Part One)"	Story by : Judith and Garfield Reeves-Stevens; Teleplay by : Brynne Stephens	November 11, 1995	4308-009
Trapped in Cyberville, the Madison family offers Gorda a partnership in Maximum, Inc. if she helps them escape. Meanwhile, Kit learns that his father is still alive, having just awakened from sixteen years in cryogenic stasis, but does not have long to live due to his exposure to the toxic chemicals from the Sector Zero crash.
30	10	"The Sacrifice (Part Two)"	Story by : Judith and Garfield Reeves-Stevens; Teleplay by : Michael Reaves	November 18, 1995	4308-038
The Madisons escape Cyberville with Gorda's help, and immediately begin plotting to rebuild Maximum, Inc. and conquer Metropia. Elsewhere, Mr. Cairo offers to help the Phantom find the data he needs to make an antidote to save his father's life in Maximum's data banks, but must put his own existence at risk to do so.
31	11	"Rogue"	Story by : Judith and Garfield Reeves-Stevens; Teleplay by : Shari Goodhartz	November 25, 1995	4308-057
Heisenberg is branded a rogue biot after Dr. Jak records a secret gathering of his fellow self-aware biots and claims that they are planning a revolt. The Enforcers ask Maxwell Jr. to assist them in hunting Heisenberg down, unaware that he intends to retake control of the biot for himself.
32	12	"The Second Time Around"	Story by : Judith and Garfield Reeves-Stevens; Teleplay by : Mel Gilden	February 11, 1996	4308-022
The Phantom is forced by Guran to let a criminal escape after the thief shows them a gold coin marked with the Good Mark, and enters a virtually-reconstructed story of one of the 20th Phantom's adventures to discover how the coin came to be in his possession.
33	13	"The Furies"	Story by : Judith and Garfield Reeves-Stevens; Teleplay by : Brynne Stephens	February 18, 1996	4308-035
When Gorda's theft of a cache of iridium belonging to Maximum, Inc. causes a rift in her partnership with Rebecca, Maxwell Sr. attempts to manipulate both the Enforcers and the Phantom against both sides to his own advantage.
34	14	"Moments of Truth"	Story by : Judith and Garfield Reeves-Stevens; Teleplay by : Shari Goodhartz	February 25, 1996	4308-022
After finding out Sparks knows nothing about geography, Kit enrolls him in special classes at the university. Meanwhile, the partnership between Maximum, Inc. and Gorda continues to erode as Rebecca has rare Brazilian roses smuggled into Metropia behind Gorda's back. As the Phantom tries to find out what makes the roses so valuable to Rebecca, Maxwell Jr. and Graft plan to use Sparks to find the location of the Skull Lair.
35	15	"The Whole Truth"	Richard Merwin	March 3, 1996	4308-035
As Rebecca deploys her biot army on the streets of Metropia in an attempt to take over the city, Maxwell Sr. reveals the whole truth behind the fateful Sector Zero crash, leading the Phantom to make one final effort to bring down Maximum, Inc.

== In other media ==
=== Video game ===
A Phantom 2040 video game was produced for Sega Genesis, Game Gear and Super NES, and like the animated series, it received very positive reviews despite its obscurity. It is possible to play as both the Phantom and, in the Game Gear version, his alter-ego, Kit Walker. The game has over 20 different endings, depending on the choices the player makes while progressing through the story, and revolves around Rebecca Madison's attempts to create a biot army, revive her dead husband and seize control of both Metropia and the world.

=== Comic books ===
Phantom 2040 was adapted into a comic book series by Marvel Comics in 1995 (cover dated May–August 1995). Only four issues were published, released as a mini-series. The stories were only loosely based on the TV series, and was notably different in tone from the dark, complex animated show. The comic book was written by Peter Quinones, pencilled by Spider-Man co-creator Steve Ditko and inked by Bill Reinhold. Each issue featured a free poster drawn by such artists as John Romita Sr.

== Home media and streaming ==
=== VHS ===
Family Home Entertainment VHS Releases 1994/1995 (USA)

A straight-to-video compilation titled Phantom 2040: The Ghost Who Walks was released in the USA on VHS by Family Home Entertainment in 1994 (and re-released on May 21, 1996). It is made up of the first five episodes of season 1 edited into a single movie.

Family Home Entertainment subsequently released eight first-season episodes across four commercially available VHS tapes (in the USA) on August 22, 1995:

1) Generation Unto Generation Parts 1 and 2

2) Fire and I.C.E. / The Sum of the Parts

3) Dark Orbit Parts 1 and 2

4) The Ghost in the Machine / The Biot in Red

=== DVD ===
Lions Gate DVD Release 2004 (USA)

Phantom 2040: The Ghost Who Walks was re-released on DVD by Lions Gate on September 21, 2004 and remains available for purchase in most counties as a US import.

Via Vision Entertainment DVD Release 2013 (Australia) In Australia (where the popularity of Lee Falk's original Phantom comic strip has never waned), Season One was released as a four-disc DVD collection (containing the first twenty episodes of the show) by Via Vision Entertainment on 6 November 2013.

=== YouTube ===
The Complete Phantom 2040 on YouTube All 35 episodes of Phantom 2040 (33 original episodes plus the first and second season "bridging" compilation episodes Rite of Passage and The World is My Jungle) are officially available for viewing on YouTube via the Comics Kingdom channel. Comics Kingdom is the official YouTube channel of King Features Syndicate, who hold all rights to The Phantom. The Comics Kingdom channel also features all episodes of the Phantom 2040 production team's later Flash Gordon show and all episodes of Defenders of the Earth (starring Flash Gordon, The Phantom and Mandrake the Magician).
