= Diana Palmer (The Phantom) =

Fictional character from The Phantom comic strip

Diane Palmer

Publication information
- Publisher: King Features Syndicate, Egmont; Frew; Moonstone and many others
- Created by: Lee Falk

In-story information
- Team affiliations: the UN's Bangalla office
- Supporting character of: The Phantom

Diana Palmer is a character in the American comic strip The Phantom. She is married to Kit Walker, the titular hero. The couple have two children together, Kit and Heloise. Most recently, Diana has been working in the UN's Bangalla office.

== Publication history ==
=== Family ===
Diana was born into a wealthy family, to her parents, Lily Palmer and Henry Zapman. Zapman's fate is unknown, but he is presumed to have died well Diana was still young, leaving Lily Palmer to raise her only child with the help of her brother, Dave Palmer. She has three cousins, Don, Lisa and Ann Palmer, but no siblings.

=== Meeting Kit Walker ===
Diana first met Kit Walker in Clarksville, United States, when they were both children. Kit, having recently arrived to live in the United States together with his faithful friend Guran of the Bandar tribe, had run away from his aunt and uncle, Sid and Bessie, due to strong homesickness. Diana, only eight years old at the time, convinced the ten-year-old Kit to stay together with his aunt and uncle.

Sometime later, Kit rescued Diana from a panther, which had recently escaped from the local Zoo, and was now running freely around in Clarksville. Kit, with his years of jungle training, shot the animal dead with a bow and arrows he had taken from his sports-teacher.

After the dramatic events with the panther, the two did not see each other for years, before they were unexpectedly reunited at a Christmas party several years later, both around the age of eighteen to twenty. Kit was already a celebrated sportsman in almost every field, and Diana had broken records for her diving.

Kit and Diana fell in love with each other that Christmas holiday, the relationship going as far as Kit considering proposing to her.

However, his plans were interrupted by Guran, who came back to the United States from Bangalla to tell Kit that his father was dying after being stabbed in the back by Rama Singh, leaving Kit with no other choice than leaving Diana and travelling back to his homeland to take over the mantle of the Phantom.

=== Marriage ===
Kit proposed to Diana in the Sunday strip of October 30, 1977, and she immediately accepted at that time. Kit and Diana married later in 1977. The wedding took place in Skull Cave. President of Bangalla Lamanda Luaga and President of Ivory-Lana Goranda were both present at the wedding, and so were Mandrake the Magician, Lothar and Diana's mother and uncle, Lily and Dave Palmer.

=== Career ===
After a short career as a nurse, Diana is today working in the UN and also has an Olympic medal in diving and a black belt in karate.

== In other media ==
In 1979, Norwegian musicians Herodes Falsk and Jahn Teigen wrote a song, "Sala Palmer", about Diana (named Sala in the Norwegian translation), sung from the perspective of The Phantom.

Diana was portrayed by Jeanne Bates in the 1943 Phantom movie serial. However, in the serial, she is the niece of Professor Davidson, and she is not romantically involved with the Phantom, but is intending to marry a man named Byron Anderson in the beginning of the story.

In 1996, Kristy Swanson portrayed her in Paramount's big budget film The Phantom, featuring Billy Zane in the title role. Diana is here sent out by her uncle Dave (in the film, a wealthy newspaper publisher) to Bangalla to help with the search for a fabled weapon of doom, the Skulls of Touganda. When she is trapped by the henchmen of bad guy Xander Drax, she is saved by the Phantom, who unbeknownst to her is really her college boyfriend, Kit Walker. Towards the end of the film (according to the novelisation) she works out the Phantom's true identity based on the fact that he appeared just after Kit disappeared.

In the 2009 miniseries, Diana Palmer Walker is seen in the opening sequence fleeing with young Kit from Singh Brotherhood assassins in a desperate car chase through New York. She uses an automatic to fight back, but is killed (presumably drowned) when her car is driven off the street into the river. Kit manages to escape the sinking car, but because of a concussion from the crash develops slight amnesia but dreams of her for many years while not knowing who she really is.
