= The Story of the Phantom: The Ghost Who Walks =

1973 novel by Lee Falk

- Cover to "The Story of the Phantom", drawn by George Wilson.
- Author: Lee Falk
- Cover artist: George Wilson
- Language: English
- Genre: Superhero fiction
- Publication place: United States

The Story of the Phantom: The Ghost Who Walks is a novel written by Lee Falk in 1973, based on his own comic strip creation The Phantom.

== Plot ==
The book tells the story about Kit Walker, son of the 20th Phantom, who will one day grow up to take over the mantle from his father and become the 21st Phantom.

The book starts with Kit's birth in the Skull Cave. Several chapters are dedicated to him growing up in the Bangalla jungle, where the readers get to see events and lessons that shape him to the man he will once become.

When Kit reaches the age of 12, he travels to Clarksville, Missouri, USA, to receive a proper education (it is a tradition in the Phantom family that the children are sent away to their mother's homeland for education). Kit lives with his mother's sister and her husband in Clarksville.

Kit is a brilliant student, and receives excellent grades in every subject. Kit proves to be a talented sportsman, and is predicted to become the world champion of a number of genres, even knocking out the boxing champion of the world in a match in Clarksville.

Kit also meets his future wife-to-be, Diana Palmer, on a Christmas party on his school.

Despite being able to choose practically any career he wants, Kit faithfully returns to Bengalla to take over the role of the Phantom when he receives word from his childhood friend Guran that his father, the 20th Phantom, is dying from wounds he received in a battle with pirates trying to rob a jungle hospital.

== Inspirations ==
Falk based the book on his comic strip story "Childhood of the Phantom".

== Audio book version ==
An edited version of the novel was released in Norway in 2006.
