= The Phantom (1996 film) =

1996 superhero film by Simon Wincer

- Theatrical release poster
- Directed by: Simon Wincer
- Written by: Jeffrey Boam
- Based on: The Phantom by Lee Falk
- Produced by: Alan Ladd Jr.; Robert Evans
- Starring: Billy Zane; Treat Williams; Kristy Swanson; Catherine Zeta-Jones; James Remar; Patrick McGoohan
- Cinematography: David Burr
- Edited by: O. Nicholas Brown; Bryan H. Carroll
- Music by: David Newman
- Production companies: The Ladd Company; Village Roadshow Pictures; Hearst Entertainment
- Distributed by: Paramount Pictures
- Release date: June 7, 1996
- Running time: 100 minutes
- Countries: United States; Australia
- Language: English
- Budget: $45-50 million
- Box office: $23.5 million

The Phantom is a 1996 superhero film directed by Simon Wincer. Based on Lee Falk's comic strip The Phantom by King Features, the film stars Billy Zane as a seemingly immortal crimefighter and his battle against all forms of evil. The Phantom also stars Treat Williams, Kristy Swanson, Catherine Zeta-Jones, James Remar and Patrick McGoohan.

Principal photography began in October 1995 and concluded on February 13, 1996. The film was shot in California, Thailand and Australia.

The Phantom was released on June 7, 1996, and received mixed reviews from film critics. Despite financial failure in its theatrical release, the film has enjoyed success on VHS, DVD and Blu-ray, and has developed a cult following.

== Plot ==
In the early 16th century, a young boy helplessly witnesses his father killed by Kabai Sengh, the vicious pirate leader of the Sengh Brotherhood, who attacked their ship. The boy jumps overboard and is washed ashore on Bengalla, an Asian island where local tribesmen find him and take him to their village. There he is given the Skull Ring, swears to devote his life to resisting vice and enforcing virtue, and as an adult, adopts the identity of "The Phantom", a masked avenger. The role of The Phantom is passed on from father to son through 400 years, leading people to believe in a single, immortal figure.

In 1938, Kit Walker, the 21st Phantom, finds Quill leading a group of grave robbers in the jungle. They are searching a burial place for one of the Skulls of Touganda, which grants its owner a tremendously destructive power. The Phantom saves the native boy they kidnapped to be their guide and captures Quill's men, leaving them for the Jungle Patrol to pick up. Revealed to be a Sengh Brotherhood member and the man who killed Kit's father - whose ghost frequently appears to give Kit advice - Quill flees with the Skull and returns to the United States.

In New York City, Kit's college girlfriend, Diana Palmer, is a frequent traveler whose uncle, Dave Palmer, is the famous owner of the World Tribune newspaper. The paper has been investigating power-hungry businessman Xander Drax, a shady character with a reputation for dealing with criminals. Palmer has uncovered Drax's connection to a mysterious spider web symbol, which he traces back to the Bengalla Jungle. He sends Diana to investigate but makes the mistake of telling New York's treacherous police commissioner, who is allied with Drax, of Diana's trip. Drax's female air pirates led by femme fatale, Sala, hijack the plane; Diana is abducted and taken to their waterfront base in Bengalla. Having been informed of Diana's abduction by the Jungle Patrol's captain, Phillip Horton, the Phantom rescues her and escapes from Quill and his men to his headquarters, the Skull Cave.

In New York, now dressed as his civilian self, Kit meets with David Palmer at the World Tribune and once again meets with Diana, who has mixed feelings about him since his sudden disappearance several years before. Diana's would-be suitor Jimmy Wells mentions he had seen one of the skulls in the Museum of World History, so Kit and Diana hurry there. Drax and his men capture them, steal the second Skull and unite it with the first, revealing the location of the third Skull on an uncharted island in the Andaman Sea, known as the Devil's Vortex. Kit manages to escape and, as the Phantom, evades the police outside the museum. Meanwhile, after Sala reveals that Diana is the Phantom's girlfriend, she flies Drax, Quill, and Diana to the Devil's Vortex, not knowing that the Phantom has managed to hitch a ride on one of the plane's landing pontoons.

On the island, Drax meets with the pirate Kabai Sengh, direct descendant of the Brotherhood's original leader, who possesses the third Skull. Sengh warns Drax of the Fourth Skull's existence, which controls the power of the other three. The Phantom appears and battles both men, with Kabai Sengh killed by sharks, and Diana and Sala cooperate to defeat the other villains. Drax unites the three Skulls and turns their power against the Phantom; Quill is accidentally hit and disintegrated in the process. The Phantom uses the Fourth Skull – his own magic ring – to turn the Skulls' power back against them, destroying them and Drax in a powerful explosion. As the energy causes a volcanic eruption, the Phantom narrowly escapes with Diana and Sala.

Returning to Bengalla, Diana reveals to the Phantom that she has figured out his secret and double identity. Kit removes his mask, telling her that he can only disclose all of his secrets to one person, the woman he intends to marry, but she leaves again for New York. Kit's father laments his son's failure to pursue Diana but states that she will return to the Phantom's jungle, and Kit, one day.

== Cast ==
- Billy Zane as Kit Walker / Phantom
- Treat Williams as Xander Drax
- Kristy Swanson as Diana Palmer
- Catherine Zeta-Jones as Sala
- James Remar as Quill
- Patrick McGoohan as Mr. Walker / The 20th Phantom
- Radmar Agana Jao as Guran
- Robert Coleby as Captain Philip Horton
- Cary-Hiroyuki Tagawa as The Great Kabai Sengh
- Bill Smitrovich as Dave Palmer
- Casey Siemaszko as Morgan
- David Proval as Charlie Zephro
- Joseph Ragno as Ray Zephro
- Al Ruscio as Police Commissioner Farley
- Samantha Eggar as Lily Palmer
- Jon Tenney as Jimmy Wells
- John Capodice as Al, The Cabby

== Production ==
Rumours of a Phantom film adaptation had first started to circulate when director Sergio Leone expressed his interest in the property in an interview. Leone had started to write a script and scout locations for his proposed film version of the Phantom, which he planned to be followed by an adaptation of Lee Falk's other comic-strip hero, Mandrake the Magician. The second project was never finalized.

Joe Dante was originally attached to direct a Phantom film for Paramount Pictures in the early 1990s, and he developed a draft of the script together with Jeffrey Boam. Dante and Boam's script was originally tongue-in-cheek in tone and the climax included a winged demon. When Paramount pushed the film back a year, Dante left for other commitments, and eventually ended up being credited as one of the executive producers. According to Dante:

I developed the script with the late Jeff Boam, who wrote Innerspace, as a kind of a spoof. We were a few weeks away from shooting in Australia when the plug was pulled over the budget and the presence of a winged demon at the climax. A year or so later it was put back into production – sans demon – only nobody seemed to notice it was written to be funny, so it was – disastrously – played straight. Many unintentionally funny moments were cut after a raucous test screening and I foolishly refused money to take my name off the picture, so I'm credited as one of a zillion producers.

Simon Wincer, who had been a fan of the character since childhood, got the job of director. When he traveled to Los Angeles to meet with Paramount executives, he discovered that they intended to release the film in July 1996. The Phantom was originally intended to be filmed in Hawaii, and the production schedule would go over budget by $10 million. Wincer decided to film it in New York City, Thailand and his native Australia, reducing the budget by $12 million as a result.

Wincer then cast Billy Zane, who had won praise for his work as a psychopath in Dead Calm, as the Phantom. Zane, a huge fan of the comic strip after being introduced to it on the set of Dead Calm, won the part after competition from Bruce Campbell and New Zealand actor Kevin Smith. After his casting, he spent over a year and a half to get the right muscular look of the Phantom. He also studied the character's body language in comic strip artwork, carefully imitating it in his performance.

The special Phantom costume effects were provided by Jim Henson's Creature Shop.

=== Filming ===
Filming began on October 3, 1995, in Los Angeles at Greystone Park. For the exterior of the Palmers' English-style manor the mansion of Playboy magazine's Hugh Hefner, a longtime fan of the Phantom, was used.

The Los Angeles Zoo in Griffith Park doubled for New York City's Central Park Zoo, the setting for a chase sequence. Shooting continued on Hollywood studio backlot streets that recreated the 1938 version of New York City. Over fifty vintage cars were used on the streets, and four hundred extras costumed in authentic period clothing were employed.

In October, the production traveled to Thailand for seven weeks of filming there, with the country doubling as the Phantom's fictional home country Bengalla. Action scenes such as the Phantom saving a boy from a collapsing rope bridge were filmed here. Production designer Paul Peters changed a deserted warehouse in the town Krabi into a large sound stage, where the Phantom's Skull Cave abode was erected, including his Chronicle Chamber, vault, and radio and treasure rooms.

In December, the crew traveled to Australia, where production occupied eight sound stages at the Village Roadshow Studios on the Gold Coast, Queensland. At Stage 5, the Singh Pirates Cave was constructed, constituting the largest interior setting ever built in the country. The New York offices of Xander Drax were constructed on Stage 6. Filming in Queensland also took the production to the Brisbane City Hall, where the interior lobby was redecorated to resemble a New York museum, where Kit Walker finds one of the three Skulls of Touganda. Manor Apartment Hotel in Brisbane was used as a stand in for a New York skyscraper.

On the final day of shooting, the production relocated to Los Angeles, California to complete a scene that would ultimately end up deleted from the final cut of the film, where the Phantom wrestles a lion. Filming concluded on February 13, 1996.

Many scenes developing the romance between the Phantom and Diana Palmer were cut in order to make the film more fast-paced. An action scene featuring the Phantom fighting a snake was also cut. A scene with the Phantom and his horse Hero rearing in the sunset was cut out of the film, but shown at the end of the 1996 A&E documentary The Phantom: Comic Strip Crusader.

== Relation to the original stories ==
The film features several elements from Lee Falk's first two Phantom stories from the 1936 daily newspaper strips, "The Singh Brotherhood" and "The Sky Band". Several of the characters in the film derive from these stories: Kabai Sengh (played by Cary-Hiroyuki Tagawa), leader of the Sengh Brotherhood (the name of the brotherhood was changed to 'Sengh' in the film, to avoid offending people named Singh), Sala (played by Catherine Zeta-Jones), leader of the Sky Band, a group of female air pirates, and Jimmy Wells (Jon Tenney), a wealthy playboy.

The more realistic plots of Falk's original stories were dropped in favor of an adventure tale that featured the supernatural "Skulls of Touganda". Falk's story "The Belt", where the Phantom fights the killer of his father, was also a major influence on the story, but the name of the murderer is changed from Rama to Quill, and the 20th Phantom, played by Patrick McGoohan, is portrayed as a much older man in the film than in the comic strip.

== Release ==
To coincide with the premiere of the film, the Phantom was used as a part of the Got Milk? campaign, based on the character's drinking milk in the comic. Two different Phantom action figures were made by Street Player, and promotional Phantom-rings were also offered. Different sets of Phantom collecting cards were also available in countries such as the United States, Australia, Finland and Sweden. Movie theater popcorn tubs and paper soda cups featuring the film's poster were also used to help promote the film.

== Reception ==
The film suffered the same fate as two other period-piece comic book/pulp adaptations of the 1990s, The Rocketeer (1991) and The Shadow (1994), and did not fare well at the box office in the United States, debuting at number six the weekend of June 7, 1996. It has since sold well on VHS and DVD.

On Rotten Tomatoes, the film has a 44% rating based on 50 reviews, with the site's consensus: "The script gives Billy Zane little to work with, and thus he plays the Phantom as a friendly but completely one-dimensional hero". On Metacritic it has a score of 53% based on reviews from 22 critics, indicating "mixed or average reviews". Audiences polled by CinemaScore gave the film a grade B+ on scale of A to F. Roger Ebert of the Chicago Sun-Times called it "one of the best-looking movies in a long time", giving the film three-and-a-half stars out of four.

Many critics were pleased with The Phantom's simple, nostalgic tone. In the Los Angeles Times, Kenneth Turan described it as a modest, unassuming film which "is gently self-mocking as opposed to excessively wised up. With a straight-arrow hero and villains that wouldn't scare a tadpole, it holds our interest via its human scale and the pleasure it takes in being true to its origins". He praised the director's synergy with the script and actors, and approved of how the action sequences rely on practical stunts rather than computer generated images, saying this lends faithfulness to the character's pulp roots. Godfrey Cheshire in Variety that the film "brings a light touch to appealingly old-fashioned action material, creating a fast-moving yarn". He approved of the decision to sidestep the Phantom's African origin (which was considered racially insensitive by the time of the film's release) instead of reworking it, and while he acknowledged that the character's portrayal is two-dimensional, he felt that this was also appropriate to the old-fashioned tone. British critic Kim Newman wrote for Empire that the film "has a pleasant feel – few superheroes have been as sunny and optimistic – as Zane breezes through chases and fights, stops for the odd quip – and pals around with a heroic horse, a dashing dog and the helpful ghost of his father", and gave the film three out of five stars.

Owen Gleiberman of Entertainment Weekly reviled the title character as hopelessly outdated, adding that "as the Phantom, Billy Zane, buff to the max, has a likable insouciance, but there's not much he can do to flesh out this relic. With its generic stunts and chases, its hand-me-down cheeseball mysticism (the plot hinges on a hunt for magic skulls), the film, while crisply shot, has even less personality than such crusader retreads as The Rocketeer and The Shadow". He gave the film a C. Trevor Johnston of Time Out gave a negative review and said that the film looks "tamely second-hand".

The Stinkers Bad Movie Awards picked this film for the Founders Award - What Were They Thinking and Why? alongside The Stupids when conducting their 1996 ballot.

== Future ==
Billy Zane originally signed up to do two sequels, but these were not made because of the disappointing sale of tickets for The Phantom in theaters.

In 2008, Paramount Pictures was considering creating a sequel to The Phantom, with Zane, Swanson and Zeta-Jones returning in their roles. Instead of the sequel, a reboot of the Phantom was in the works, called The Phantom: Legacy, to be produced by Bruce Sherlock (who was also an executive producer of The Phantom) and written by Tim Boyle. Sam Worthington was being considered for the lead role. By 2014, plans for this film had fallen through as well, and producer Mark Gordon was instead attached to a Phantom reboot.

== Novelization ==
A novelization of The Phantom was written by Rob MacGregor, the author of a series of Indiana Jones novels. This novel included a more detailed look at the backstory of many characters, and the origin of The Phantom. Several scenes that were omitted from the final cut of the movie are also included.

== Home media release ==
The Phantom was released on Blu-ray on February 9, 2010, by Lionsgate and re-released by Paramount on September 15, 2020.

The film was released on 4K UHD and Blu-ray by Kino Lorber under its KL Studio Classics line on April 14, 2026.

== Soundtrack ==
The film's score was composed by David Newman, who previously collaborated with director Simon Wincer on Operation Dumbo Drop, and performed by the London Metropolitan Orchestra under the composer's baton. A soundtrack album was released by Milan on June 4, 1996; La-La Land Records issued an expanded edition on July 3, 2012.
