= Phantom 2040 (video game) =

1995 video game

- Developers: Viacom New Media Chicago Team (SNES/Genesis); Unexpected Development (Game Gear)
- Publisher: Viacom New Media
- Producer: Jeff Trautman
- Designers: Brian Babendererde; Jeff Troutman
- Programmers: Paul Hellier; Patrick Costello
- Composers: Burke Treischmann; Matt Scott
- Platforms: Super NES, Genesis, Game Gear
- Release: NA: June 1995; EU: October 1995
- Genre: Action-adventure
- Mode: Single-player

Phantom 2040 is an action-adventure platform game published by Viacom New Media in 1995 for the Genesis, Super NES and Game Gear. The game is directly based upon the animated television series Phantom 2040 but follows a plotline not strictly taken by the show. The game has been classified as a metroidvania, and plays similarly to the Metroid and Castlevania series.

== Gameplay ==
Phantom 2040 follows primarily side-scrolling action elements with a heavy emphasis on exploration. It is up to the player to locate the area's objective or exit, and every area offers optional areas with restoration kits or weapon upgrades. Some areas are locked by numbered gates that must be opened by destroying the remote lock of the same number, located elsewhere in that area. Additionally, some locks can only be accessed if the area is reached by a secret underground network of sewer systems which connect every area. The area's objective may include locating a keycard, dealing with a boss or simply finding access to the next area. The majority of areas can all be revisited at the player's leisure anytime after they are unlocked.

At several points in the storyline, players can make a direct choice about which path they take (in each case, the paths reconvene at the next chapter). The choices the player makes change the scenes that make up ending, meaning there are over 20 different scenes available that mix and match to make up the full ending. Only one ending is classified as a successful ending, while all the others result in negative outcomes for the city of Metropia and present the player with the message "Try Again".

== Version differences ==
The story line in Phantom 2040 is presented differently in the NTSC and PAL versions of the game. In the NTSC version of Phantom 2040 in the options menu the player has the choice of having the game's story presented to them in cinematics between levels and dialog between characters, or in a short point-list of what happens in those cinematics. In the PAL version, only the summarized story line is available, and the player may choose what language the game's text is displayed in.

== Plot ==
While the backstory Phantom 2040 is exactly the same as the backstory of the television series, the video game does not specifically enact any of the series' episodes but instead borrows elements from various episodes in the overarching story of the Phantom's mission to stop Maximum, Inc. from dominating Metropia.

=== Backstory ===
It is the year 2040, all environmental disasters and the economic Resource Wars of the early twenty-first century have had catastrophic effects upon the Earth's ecological balance. Ever-increasing polarisation of wealth, along with the development of humanoid, robotic "biots" (Biological Optical Transputer Systems), have resulted in a social demographic that leaves the majority of the world's population scavenging in the undercity slums while a wealthy minority live luxurious lives in towering skyscrapers. The Earth's population continues to rise, but without the resources to support them or the jobs to sustain them, they are cast onto the streets of the over-urbanised mega-cities.

The megalopolis of Metropia, a reformed and renamed New York City, is the world's most powerful city-state and within it are the headquarters of the world's most powerful corporation, Maximum Inc. Maximum's mass production of biots and its influence upon the world's corrupted leaders has allowed it to shape Metropia into a cold and metallic urban center, where technologically advanced buildings and transport systems have replaced any natural plant or animal life. Maximum's chairperson, Rebecca Madison, driven by the violent death of her husband Maxwell Madison Sr. and a desire for revenge against the Phantom who she believes killed him, has plans to construct an impenetrable fortress called Cyberville where the elite wealthy can retreat once Earth deteriorates beyond hope of restoration. Maximum's hidden underground biot factories are illegally constructing Maximum's personal biot army, which Rebecca will use to guarantee the world's collapse so that she may take control of the world through Cyberville.

In the Ghost Jungle (a gigantic, hidden stretch of jungle twisting through Metropia's ruins and underground), Kit Walker discovers that he is the 24th Phantom, sworn to bring an end to piracy, greed, and violence, a role passed from father to son for 500 years. Kit's father was killed with Maxwell Madison Sr. in a mysterious toxic train wreck, and now it is up to the Phantom to stop Rebecca Madison's plans of worldwide domination.

=== Game storyline ===
The game's storyline revolves around multiple threats against Metropia. Rebecca Madison seeks to find the fabled Black Panther, the last of its kind, to use its blood in an infusion that will allow her to trap her dead husband's captured brainwaves inside a living body. Once Maxwell Madison Sr. is revived, Maximum will be unstoppable.

However, a rogue smuggler called Tracker has captured the Black Panther and both Maximum and the Phantom will do anything to rescue it. The Phantom succeeds first, but must decide between keeping the Panther safe in the Ghost Jungle or exchanging it to the shady information broker Mr. Cairo for the whereabouts of the Phantom's friend and mentor Professor Archer, who has been kidnapped by Maximum.

Meanwhile, Maximum is secretly harvesting rare Ghost Jungle plants with photosynthetic properties for use in particle laser technologies. Rebecca Madison is constructing a giant battleship under the facade of protecting the Political Summit, which is soon to meet in Metropia, but in actuality plans to destroy the Summit before it can outlaw combat biots of any kind. The Phantom manages to warn the Summit and destroy the battleship Prometheus, but further plant shipments are being sent to Sean One, terrorist and leader of the Orbital colonies who will go to any lengths to achieve independence for the Orbital people.

The Phantom must find a way to stop both Sean One's deadly particle beam cannon and Rebecca's use of the Panther in restoring her husband's brainwaves, but there are multiple other threads to deal with in the process, including:

- Experiments with mutants in secret laboratories below the city
- Massive combat biot factories building new, dangerous types of biots
- A missile launch targeting a suburban area
- Rebecca's Madison's disturbed son, Max Madison Jr. in his virtually controlled Legion biot
- A group of telepathically mutated women called the Triad

=== Differences between the game and series ===
The game ignores several important plot "twists" revealed in the cartoon. For example, in the game, Mr. Cairo is not yet completely loyal to the Phantom. Additionally, Maxwell Madison Sr, who is revealed late in the series to have been good friends with the 23rd Phantom up until his death, remains antagonistic in the game's last chapter. Sagan Cruz's allegiance with the Phantom is absent, though she is seen reporting on events within the game. Otherwise, the game's characters remain very accurate to the characters seen in the series: Dr. Jak arrogantly and enthusiastically reports events between chapters, Graft's loyalty to Maximum wavers multiple times, Maxwell Madison Jr. has the same cool and uninterested attitude, and Sean One remains coldly apathetic towards humankind on Earth.

== Reception ==
Electronic Gaming Monthly gave the Super NES version a 6.875 out of 10. Three of their four reviewers had an overall positive reaction to the game, though they criticized the constant spawning of robot enemies and the lack of originality. They were critical of the walking animation for the title character but assessed the graphics in general to be very good, and also praised the game's cinematics and non-linear quest. Atomic Dawg of GamePro, while cautioning that the game's high difficulty makes it suitable only for hardcore gamers, was more enthusiastic, calling it "a rip-roaring action/adventure game that pumps the best elements of the genre: fast-moving, side-view, beat-em-up action; multiple selectable weapons; and hordes of enemies." He additionally praised the "excellent" controls, graphics, and multiple endings. He reviewed the Genesis version with equal enthusiasm, commenting that "if you hunger for a 16-bit challenge, Phantom 2040 is a feast made even more satisfying by lengthy replay value."

Bro' Buzz of GamePro had a much more mixed assessment of the Game Gear version, stating the gameplay is strong with a variety of "slick moves", but that the audio and graphics pale compared to the console versions, making it easy to lose track of the Phantom and his enemies against the backgrounds.
