= Radmar Agana Jao =

American priest and former actor (born 1966)

Radmar Agana Jao, SJ (born November 7, 1966) is an American Jesuit priest and former actor.

== Biography ==
He is originally from Valparaiso, Indiana, and is one of nine children. He was born in Gary, Indiana, on November 7, 1966, to Tessie Agana, a Filipina actress from the 1950s.

Jao received his bachelor's degree in Communications from Indiana University, then moved to Los Angeles and became an actor, working in film (The Phantom, Minority Report, Diplomatic Siege), television (Seinfeld, Will and Grace, Dharma and Greg, ER, Double Rush), and stage (Sweeney Todd, A Language of their Own, Heading East - The Musical). He also volunteered for an after-school arts intervention program called Inside Out, working with at-risk youth in some of the roughest neighborhoods of Los Angeles.

Jao entered the California Province of the Society of Jesus in 2001 and earned a master's degree in Applied Philosophy from Loyola University of Chicago. During his two-year regency at the University of San Francisco he taught acting and theatre appreciation, and worked with the University Ministry team, leading student groups and coordinating retreats. Jao completed a Master of Divinity from the Jesuit School of Theology of Santa Clara University in Berkeley, where alongside his studies he served as a campus minister at Cal Berkeley's Newman Center, as chaplain for the Children's Hospital Oakland, and as a transitional deacon at St. Agnes Parish in San Francisco.

In the summer of 2010 Jao completed a two-month training program at the Loyola House Retreat and Training Centre in Guelph, Ontario, Canada. Jao was ordained a priest on June 11, 2011. Jao's first mission after ordination was to serve on the Provincial Staff of the California Province as the Province Vocation Promoter.
