= Bangalla =

Fictionaly country from The Phantom

- Created by: Lee Falk

In-universe information
- Other names: Bengal; Bengali; Bengalla; Luntok
- Type: African or Asian country
- Characters: The Phantom; Guran; Lamanda Luaga; Mr Devil (The Phantom's wolf, a legal citizen)
- Publisher: King Features Syndicate

Bangalla (/bənˈɡælə, -ˈɡɑːl-/), also known as Bengalla (in the 1996 movie adaptation), Bengal or Bengali, is a fictional African country from Lee Falk's comic strip The Phantom. Bangalla is the home of the Phantom, who resides in the Deep Woods of the jungle in the fabled Skull Cave. Until the 1960s, the country was portrayed as being in Asia, near India. In the 1996 film, Bengalla is located in Asia instead of Africa. In the 2009 miniseries, Bangalla is a fictional small island nation located in the Malay Archipelago.

== Geography ==
In the earliest stories, the shipwreck that began the Phantom legacy occurred in the Bay of Bengal. At that time, the Phantom’s location was a fictional island called Luntok, situated in the Dutch East Indies, and described by Lee Falk as "a British protectorate on the coast of Java."

Later, the setting shifted to the mainland region of Bengali, a fictional country located near India, evoking the culture and geography of the Indian subcontinent.

In recent stories, Bangalla is located in East Africa, around the approximate region of Tanzania, Kenya, Uganda and Ethiopia. The capital of Bangalla is Mawitaan (formerly Morristown); other cities include Bengalitown, Sanloi, Spyglass and Mucar.

== Characterization ==
=== Name ===
The names Bengali and Bangalla appear to have been inspired by Bengal, the eastern part of the Indian subcontinent located at the head of the Bay of Bengal. The term "Bangāl" became the common name for the Bangladesh during the Islamic period, which began in the late 12th century and lasted until the mid-18th century.

== Flag ==
Flag of Bangalla

The daily strips beginning 14 Dec. 2018 (see also 11 Jan and 2 March 2019) depicted the Bangallan flag as a light blue field with a yellow crescent moon at the viewer's left (i.e. a crescent Or at the hoist, its horns facing sinister), occupying the whole vertical width of the flag; and at the viewer's right (heraldic sinister), a star of approximately 12 rays atop a besant (disk) of the same (i.e. also yellow). The position of these last two charges is sometimes reversed—possibly due to error on the part of the artist, Mike Manley, or to the flag being shown from the reverse. The flag bears some resemblance to the real-world flag of East Turkestan, while the smaller charges recall those on the flag of Nepal. Since the crescent generally symbolizes Islam, its appearance on the flag of Bangalla (which has never been depicted as a majority-Muslim nation) represents something of an oddity.

== Regime ==
Bangalla is a former British colony that since became a democracy. The country's first president was Lamanda Luaga, a doctor elected to office after having fought an epidemic in the jungle. However, General Bababu seized control of the country and, after announcing that Luaga was dead, searched for Luaga to kill him and exhibit his head as proof. The Phantom, however, abducted Bababu and brought him to the Deep Woods where Luaga defeated him in a fair one-on-one fight. The Council of Chiefs sentenced Bababu to two years' hard labor at each of the 12 tribal nations. General Bababu has, however, never given up the hopes of becoming dictator of Bangalla and has been a recurring villain in Phantom lore, usually in cooperation with other dictators who seek a marionette-president.

=== According to Team Fantomen ===
After the above events, Team Fantomen added its own twists to the politics of Bangalla. Luaga lost a re-election bid to the pathologically evil Kigali Lubanga, who ruled the country as a dictator during the non-comics-world years of 1994–1996, before he was apparently killed and Luaga came back to take control of a country that was in uproar.

Lubanga has since shown up on several occasions to haunt the Phantom and try to take power. Although Luaga was able to imprison him, Lubanga had destroyed all evidence against him so he could never be convicted in a fair trial. After Lubanga escaped, it became known that Luaga had kept him imprisoned for years, which came across as a greedy political decision to get rid of a rival. Luaga then resigned, after which Lubanga tried to take power but was hindered by the Phantom, and disappeared.

Sandal Singh, leader of the Singh Brotherhood, was subsequently elected president, an office she held in stories produced until 2015.

== Neighbouring countries ==
Bangalla is also near Ivory Lana (also called Fari Lana), whose president Goranda is a friend of Luaga and Rodia (also written Rhodia).

== Laws and Constitution ==
The Constitution of Bangalla is much like the United States Constitution

The Executive Branch
The executive branch of the constitution mandates a president of the Republic of Bangalla, a vice president and a cabinet of ministers. The president and vice president are elected for a five-year term. The next presidential election will be held in 2020.

The Legislative Branch
The legislative branch is made up of a senate and a house of representatives. The members of the senate are elected for six-year terms and are chosen from each of Bangalla's 33 provinces, three from each province. The members of the house of representatives, of which there are 400, are elected for two-year terms.

The Judiciary Branch
The judiciary branch is made up of a supreme court and lesser courts. The supreme court consists of nine justices. Recent events have established that the president has the power to suspend the laws. President Luaga, for instance, suspended the rules against striking or assaulting the president, in an effort to have a fair fistfight with a citizen. Such an exhibition of power suggests that the legislature of Bangalla is weaker than those in many commonwealth countries.

=== Citizens ===
Bangalla is unique in that one of its citizens is a mountain wolf named Mr. Devil, a faithful companion to the Phantom.

== Presidents of Bangalla ==
=== According to the newspaper strip ===
1. Lamanda Luaga, Independence declaration-still holding office

=== According to Team Fantomen ===
1. Lamanda Luaga, Independence declaration-1994
2. Kigali Lubanga, 1994–1996
3. Lamanda Luaga, 1996–2005, resigned after a scandal involving holding opponent Lubanga, who was imprisoned without trial
4. Sandal Singh, 2007–2015, leader of the Singh Brotherhood
