= Kristy Swanson =

American actress (born 1969)

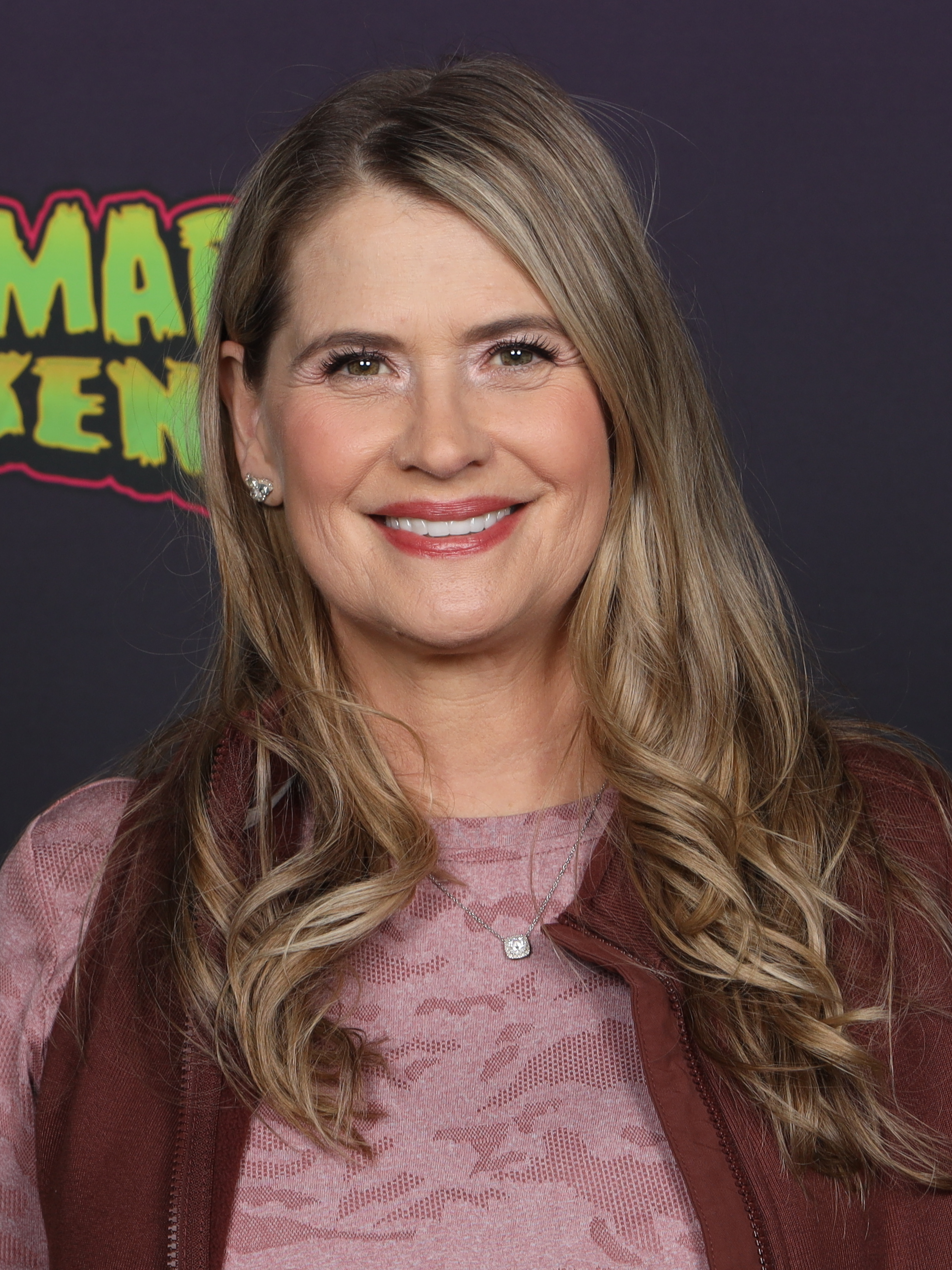
- Swanson in 2024
- Born: December 19, 1969 (age 56); Laguna Beach, California, U.S.
- Occupation: Actress
- Years active: 1984–present
- Known for: Buffy the Vampire Slayer; Flowers in the Attic; Ferris Bueller's Day Off
- Spouse: Lloyd Eisler (m. 2009)
- Children: 1

Kristy Swanson (born December 19, 1969) is an American actress. She is best recognized for having played Buffy Summers in the 1992 film Buffy the Vampire Slayer and appeared in the 1996 film The Phantom.

Her first starring role was in Wes Craven's horror film Deadly Friend (1986), followed by her portrayal of Catherine "Cathy" Dollanganger in the 1987 film adaptation of V. C. Andrews's Flowers in the Attic (1987). Swanson also starred in several films, including Hot Shots! (1991), Mannequin Two: On the Move (1991), The Program (1993), The Chase (1994), 8 Heads in a Duffel Bag (1997), Big Daddy (1999), and Dude, Where's My Car? (2000).

== Early life ==
Swanson was born in South Laguna, California at the South Coast Community Hospital and was raised in Mission Viejo, California by her parents Rosemary Albrecht and Robert Russell Swanson, a high school teacher. At the age of nine, she expressed interest in acting to her parents, and began pursuing roles in television commercials. She landed her first job appearing in a doll house commercial, which was followed with several more commercial appearances.

== Career ==
Swanson began her acting career at The Actors Workshop with R. J. Adams and promptly moved into TV advertising roles and several one-off appearances in TV series such as Cagney & Lacey and Alfred Hitchcock Presents. In 1986, she debuted on the big screen in two John Hughes films: Pretty in Pink, in a non-speaking role, and Ferris Bueller's Day Off as a character who announces a convoluted excuse for Ferris's absence in class. Her first starring role was later in 1986, in Wes Craven's Deadly Friend as Samantha – "the girl next door." The next year she played Cathy in Flowers in the Attic, an adaptation of V. C. Andrews' bestselling novel.

Swanson described how she was cast in Pretty in Pink: "[Writer] John Hughes said, 'We're re-shooting the end of Pretty in Pink. I was wondering if you would come be in this scene with our main character, Ducky, because the way we tested it in the movie theater, it didn't work. We need him to end up with somebody else at the end of the movie. So would you play the part?'"

By 1990, Swanson had made many television appearances, including multiple appearances in Knots Landing (1987–1988), Nightingales (1989), her first starring role in a television series, although it only lasted a season, and a short-lived Burt Reynolds television series called B.L. Stryker (1989).

Throughout the 1990s, she starred mostly in films. She played the title role in the 1992 film Buffy the Vampire Slayer. Although not a hit at the box office originally, it had a profitable rental life. She appeared in both starring and supporting roles in films such as Hot Shots!, The Program, The Chase, and her most critically acclaimed role, playing Kristen Connor, a student discovering her sexuality, in John Singleton's Higher Learning. She also appeared in the film adaptation of the comic-book The Phantom and the dark comedy 8 Heads in a Duffel Bag with Joe Pesci. Most of these films failed at the box office, and she reverted to television work in the late 1990s.

In the 1998–99 season of Early Edition, Swanson played Erica Paget, a love interest of the main character, Gary Hobson. In 1999, Swanson played Vanessa, the ex-girlfriend of Adam Sandler in the film Big Daddy. In 2000, she returned to a television series, as the star of Grapevine, a revamp of a 1992 TV series that was canceled after five episodes. The same year, she starred in the successful film Dude, Where's My Car?, alongside Ashton Kutcher, Seann William Scott and Jennifer Garner.

Swanson posed nude for Playboy magazine in November 2002 in a cover-featured pictorial. She appeared in and won in the 2006 Fox television program Skating with Celebrities, partnered with Lloyd Eisler.

In 2007, she became a spokesperson of the Medifast diet. In the following year, she guest-starred in three episodes of the lesbian web series 3Way. In the same year, she appeared in an episode Law & Order: Criminal Intent.

In 2021, a release date of June 15 was announced for Swanson's recent feature and a Jennifer Nichole Lee and Paul Schneider collaboration, Just Another Dream. She co-starred alongside long-time friend Dean Cain.

== Personal life ==
Swanson married her Skating with Celebrities partner Lloyd Eisler in 2009. They have a son, and two children from his previous marriage.

Swanson has described herself as "a proud Republican" and "#MAGA since 1969". She co-starred with Dean Cain in a pro-Trump stage play titled FBI Lovebirds: Undercovers directed by conservative filmmaker Phelim McAleer. Swanson has said that she received death threats as a result.

== Filmography ==
=== Film ===
Year	Title	Role	Notes
1986	Pretty in Pink	Duckette	
1986	Miracle of the Heart: A Boys Town Story	Stephanie Gamble	TV movie
1986	Ferris Bueller's Day Off	Simone Adamley	
1986	Deadly Friend	Samantha Pringle	
1987	Not Quite Human	Eron Jeffries	TV movie
1987	Flowers in the Attic	Catherine "Cathy" Dollanganger	
1988	Nightingales	Rebecca "Becky" Granger	TV movie
1990	Dream Trap	Sue Halloran	
1990	Diving In	Terry Hopkins	
1991	Mannequin Two: On the Move	Jessie	
1991	Hot Shots!	Kowalski	
1992	Highway to Hell	Rachel Clark	
1992	Buffy the Vampire Slayer	Buffy Summers	
1993	The Chili Con Carne Club	Julie	Short
1993	The Program	Camille Shafer	
1994	The Chase	Natalie Voss	
1994	Getting In	Kirby Watts	
1995	Higher Learning	Kristen Connor	
1996	The Phantom	Diana Palmer	
1996	Marshal Law	Lilly Nelson	TV movie
1997	8 Heads in a Duffel Bag	Laurie Bennett	
1997	Lover Girl	Darlene Ferrari/"Sherry"	
1997	Tinseltown	Nikki Randall	
1997	Bad to the Bone	Francesca Wells	TV movie
1998	Ground Control	Julie Albrecht	
1999	Supreme Sanction	Jenna	TV movie
1999	Big Daddy	Vanessa	
2000	Meeting Daddy	Laurel Lee	
2000	Dude, Where's My Car?	Christie Boner	
2001	Soul Assassin	Tessa Jansen	
2001	Zebra Lounge	Louise Bauer	TV movie
2002	Dead Silence	Dr. Julia Craig	
2003	Red Water	Dr. Kelli Raymond	TV movie
2005	Bound by Lies	Laura Cross	Video
2005	Forbidden Secrets	Alexandra Kent Lambeth	TV movie
2005	Six Months Later	Linda	Short
2006	The Black Hole	Shannon Muir	TV movie
2006	Living Death	Elizabeth Harris	Video
2009	The Closer	Kaitlyn	Short
2010	What If...	Wendy Walker	
2011	Swamp Shark	Rachel Bouchard	TV movie
2011	A Christmas Wish	Martha Evans	TV movie
2011	Chick Magnet	Kristy	Video
2012	Little Women, Big Cars	Rocky	
2012	Little Women, Big Cars 2	Rocky	
2012	Operation Cupcake	Janet Carson	TV movie
2013	The Bouquet	Terri Benton	
2013	Storm Rider	Jody Peterson	
2014	Mom and Dad Undergrads	Megan Mills	TV movie
2014	Beethoven's Treasure Tail	Anne Parker	Video
2014	A Belle For Christmas	Daniella Downy	
2014	Merry Ex-Mas	Noelle	TV movie
2015	Driven Underground	Sarah Palmer	TV movie
2015	Angels in the Snow	Judith Montgomery	TV movie
2017	Crowning Jules	Victoria	
2017	A Mother's Sacrifice	Kathrin	TV movie
2018	Bad Stepmother	Louise	TV movie
2018	Winter's Dream	Kat Miller	TV movie
2018	Killer Under the Bed	Sarah	
2018	Mimesis Nosferatu	Max's Mother	
2019	PupParazzi	Latte (voice)	
2020	Psych 2: Lassie Come Home	Marlowe Viccellio	TV movie
2020	The ObamaGate Movie	Lisa Page	
2021	Trafficked: A Parent's Worst Nightmare	Joanna Riley	
2021	Courting Mom and Dad	Sarah Lambert	
2021	Just Another Dream	Cindy Miller	
2026	Run Hide Fight: Infidels	Deputy Quill	

=== Television ===
Year	Title	Role	Notes
1984	It's Your Move	Laura	Episode: "Love Letters"
1985	Call to Glory	Sally	Episodes: "JFK: Parts 1 & 2"
1985	Cagney & Lacey	Stephanie Brandon	Episode: "On the Street"
1986	Alfred Hitchcock Presents	Female Student #2	Episode: "The Gloating Place"
1986	Disneyland	Jennifer Davis	Episode: "Mr. Boogedy"
1986	The Hogan Family	Linda Perkins	Episode: "The Big Fix-Up"
1987	Growing Pains	Rhonda	Episode: "Thank God It's Friday"
1987–1988	Knots Landing	Jody Campbell	Recurring Cast: Season 9
1988	Ohara	Jennifer Collins	Episode: "X"
1989	Nightingales	Rebecca "Becky" Granger	Main Cast
1989	B.L. Stryker	Lynn Ellingsworth	Recurring Cast: Season 1
1998–1999	Early Edition	Erica Paget	Main Cast: Season 3
1999	The Directors	Herself	Episode: "The Films of Wes Craven"
2000	Grapevine	Susan Crawford	Main Cast
2002	Backstory	Herself	Episode: "Buffy the Vampire Slayer"
2002	I Love the '80s	Herself	Episode: "1986"
2003	The Christopher Lowell Show	Herself	Episode: "Small Spaces"
2003	Just Shoot Me!	Allison Cavanaugh	Episode: "There's Something About Allison"
2004	CSI: Miami	Roxanne Price	Episode: "Complications"
2006	Skating with Celebrities	Herself	Main Cast
2007	Law & Order: Criminal Intent	Lorelai Mailer	Episode: "Bombshell"
2008	3Way	Leslie Lapdalulu	Recurring Cast
2009	Whatever Happened To?	Herself	Episode: "Unlikely Heroes"
2009	Hell's Kitchen	Herself	Guest Cast: Season 5-6
2009	American Chopper	Herself	Episode: "Iraq Star Foundation Bike"
2010	One Tree Hill	Woman in Car	Episode: "Don't You Forget About Me" .
2011	Comedy Central Roast	Herself	Episode: "Comedy Central Roast of Charlie Sheen"
2011–2014	Psych	Marlowe Viccellio	Recurring Cast: Season 6-8
2012	unCONventional	Herself	Recurring Cast
2018	Gutfeld!	Herself/Guest Panelist	Episode: "August 4, 2018"
2019	SEAL Team	Julia Logan	Recurring Cast: Season 4
2022	Sons of Thunder	Linda Gibson	Main Cast: Season 2

=== Music videos ===
Year	Song	Artist	Role
1992	"Keep It Comin' (Dance Till You Can't Dance No More)"	C+C Music Factory featuring Q-Unique and Deborah Cooper	Buffy Summers
2017	"Yours If You Want It"	Rascal Flatts	Stacy

== Awards and nominations ==
Wins

- 1989: Young Artist Award for Best Young Actress in a Horror or Mystery Motion Picture – Flowers in the Attic
- 2019: Independent Women's Forum Annual Award Gala – Resilience Award

Nominations

- 2021: Royal Starr Film Festival for Best Feature Film – Just Another Dream
- 2012: Movieguide Awards for Most Inspirational Television Acting – A Christmas Wish
- 2011: Movieguide Awards for Most Inspiring Movie Acting – What If...
- 1992: Fangoria Chainsaw Award for Best Actress – Buffy the Vampire Slayer
- 1988: Young Artist Award for Best Young Female Superstar in Motion Pictures – Deadly Friend
- 1987: Young Artist Award for Exceptional Young Actress Starring in a Television Special or Movie of the Week – Mr. Boogedy
- 1986: Young Artist Award for Best Young Actress – Guest in a Television Series – Cagney & Lacey episode "On the Street"
