= Lee Falk =

American comics writer (1911–1999)

- Born: Leon Harrison Gross; April 28, 1911 St. Louis, Missouri, U.S.
- Died: March 13, 1999 (aged 87) New York City, U.S.
- Areas: Writer and playwright
- Notable works: The Phantom, Mandrake the Magician
- Awards: Adamson Award, Silver T-Square Award, Yellow Kid Award, The Roman Lifetime Achievement Award

Lee Falk (/fɔːk/), born Leon Harrison Gross (/ɡroʊs/; April 28, 1911 – March 13, 1999), was an American writer, playwright, theater director, and producer, best known as the creator of the comic strips Mandrake the Magician and The Phantom. At the height of their popularity, these strips attracted over 100 million readers every day. Falk also wrote short stories, and he contributed to a series of paperback novels about The Phantom.

A playwright and theatrical director/producer, Falk directed actors such as Marlon Brando, Charlton Heston, Paul Newman, Chico Marx and Ethel Waters.

== Life and career ==
Falk was born in St. Louis, Missouri, where he spent his boyhood and his youth. His mother was Eleanor Alina (a name he later, in some form, used in both his Mandrake the Magician and The Phantom story lines), and his father was Benjamin Gross. Both of his parents were Jewish. Lee was born and raised Jewish. Gross died when Falk was just a boy, and after a time, his mother Eleanor married Albert Falk Epstein, who became the father figure for Lee Falk and his brother, Leslie. Falk changed his surname after leaving college. He took the middle name of his stepfather, but "Lee" had been his nickname since childhood, so he took that name also. His brother, Leslie, also took the name "Falk".

Falk married three times: to Louise Kanaseriff, Constance Moorehead Lilienthal, and Elizabeth Moxley. Elizabeth sometimes helped him with scripts in his later years and finished his last Phantom stories after he died. Falk had three children, Valerie (his daughter with Kanaseriff), and Diane and Conley (his daughter and son with Lilienthal).

Falk died on March 13, 1999.

== Creation of Mandrake the Magician and The Phantom ==
Falk had had a fascination for stage magicians ever since he was a boy. Falk, according to his own recollections, sketched the first few Mandrake the Magician comic strips himself. When asked why the magician looked so much like himself, he replied, "Well, of course he did. I was alone in a room with a mirror when I drew him!"

The Phantom was inspired by Falk's fascination for myths and legends, such as the ones about El Cid, King Arthur, Nordic and Greek folklore heroes and popular fictional characters like Tarzan and Mowgli from Rudyard Kipling's The Jungle Book. He was fascinated by the Thuggee of India, and hence based his first Phantom comic on the Singh Brotherhood. Falk originally considered the idea of calling his character "The Gray Ghost", but finally decided that he preferred "The Phantom". Falk revealed in an interview that Robin Hood, who was often depicted as wearing tights, inspired the skin-tight costume of The Phantom, which is known to have influenced the entire superhero industry. In the A&E Network's Phantom biography program, Falk explained that Ancient Greek stone busts inspired the notion of pupils of the eyes of The Phantom not showing whenever he wore his mask. The old Greek busts had no eye pupils, which Falk felt gave them an inhuman, interesting look.

== Theater ==
Falk's next large passion after cartooning was the theater and stage plays. During his lifetime, Falk ran five theaters, at one time or another, and he produced about 300 plays, and also directed about 100 of them. Falk wrote 12 plays, including two musicals: Happy Dollar and Mandrake the Magician, which were both based on his comic strip character.

== Awards and recognition ==
Falk won numerous awards for comics and theatre, including:

- Yellow Kid Award (1971)
- Roman Lifetime Achievement Award
- Adamson Award for best foreign comics creator (Sweden, 1977)
- Golden Adamson (Sweden, 1986)
- National Cartoonists Society's Silver T-Square Award (1986)
- In 1989, he was awarded the Inkpot Award.
- In May 1994, his birthplace St. Louis honored him with Lee Falk Day.
- In 2013, he was entered into the Will Eisner Hall of Fame.

Lee Falk has also been a candidate for a star on the St. Louis Walk of Fame many times, and was so honored in a ceremony on what would have been his 104th birthday, April 28, 2015.
