= Lions, Tigers, Bears =

Lions, Tigers, Bears (and its variations) can mean:

- Lions and Tigers and Bears, the fourth album by rock band The Adventures, released in 1993.
- Lions, Tigers & Bears (song), the fourth single released from American R&B–soul singer Jazmine Sullivan's debut album Fearless.
- Lions, Tigers and Bears (comics), a comic book series from Image Comics and Hermes Press.

== See also ==
- "Tigers and Bears", an episode of The Outsider (miniseries)
- "Liars & Tigers & Bears", a song from Megan Moroney’s 2026 album Cloud 9
