= Angoulême International Comics Festival Prix Jeunesse 7–8 ans =

The Prix Jeunesse 7-8 ans is awarded to comics authors at the Angoulême International Comics Festival. It rewards the best comic book for a 7 or 8 year old targeted public. It was first awarded in 1987 and 1988 as the "Alfred enfant", then was not presented again until 2000.

== 1980s ==
- 1987: Tendre banlieue: La briqueterie by Tito, Bayard
- 1988: Neige: Les brumes aveugles by Gine and Didier Convard, Le Lombard

== 2000s ==
- 2000: Le Diable aux trois cheveux d’or by Chicault, Delcourt
- 2001: Un drôle d’ange gardien: part 2 by Filippi and Revel, Delcourt
- 2002: Les Zinzins venteurs: Total Zinglés by Douyé, Goupil and Madaule, Casterman
- 2003: Les enquêtes de l’Inspecteur Bayard part 12 by Olivier Schwartz and Jean-Louis Fonteneau, Bayard
- 2004: Petit Vampire: La soupe au caca by Joann Sfar
- 2004 (joint winner): Popotka: Le petit Sioux Mahto by David Chauvel and Fred Simon, Delcourt
- 2005: Les p’tits diables part 2 by Dutto, Soleil
- 2006: Yakari part 31 by Derib and Job, Le Lombard
- 2007: Lions, Tigers and Bears by Mike Bullock and Jack Lawrence
