= Erik van Schaaik =

Erik van Schaaik (Maartensdijk, 24 July 1968) is a Dutch animator, screenwriter, film and television director, producer, production designer and composer.

== Biography ==
Erik van Schaaik studied graphic design at the Academy of Art in Arnhem (ArtEZ). He created children's television programs for broadcasting companies VPRO and KRO and animated short films, including VENT which won the FIPRESCI award at the International Animated Film Festival in Annecy, and Under The Apple Tree which won a Golden Calf for Best Short Film at the Netherlands Film Festival. Erik worked with i.a. Il Luster Productions, The Drawing Room, Pedri Animation, Martin Fondse, Eric Vloeimans en Ernst Reijseger.

== Filmography ==
- 1987 Side Effects – live action – 22 minutes
- 1990 Tower Of Pizza's – tabletop animation – 5 x 4 minutes
- 1991 Little Jerome – cutout animation – 3 X 4 minutes
- 1992 The Night Watch – live action / documentary – 22,5 minutes
- 1993 The Little Man In The Radio – live action / puppet animation – 3 X 6 minutes
- 1993 Bush Beasts – puppetry – 3 X 5 minutes
- 1994 Ot and Bilotte – live action – 14 X 25 minutes
- 1995–1996 Sausage Dog Titus – tabletop animation – 7 X 6 and 7 X 7 minutes
- 1998-1999-2001 Spot Light – cutout animation sequences – 13 X 3 minutes, 26 X 1 minutes, 26 X 1 minutes
- 1998 P. Tato and Small Frie – stop motion animation – 10 X 2 minutes
- 1998–2000 National Science Quiz Junior – cutout animation sequences – 8 X 2 minutes
- 2000 KRO's Kids Theatre – 2D animation - +/- 1,5 minutes
- 2000 Cinekid (leader) – 3D animation – 25 seconds
- 2001 Doctors Without Borders – 2D animation – 3,5 minutes
- 2002 That's Not All, Folks (pilot) – stop motion animation – 6 minutes
- 2003 Toddler Docs – documentary – 2 minutes per episode
- 2003–2004 Full Proof – documentary / live action / animation – 15 x 7 minutes
- 2003 Nemo – digital cutout animation – 30 seconds
- 2004 Vent – 2D animation – 4,5 minutes
- 2005 Child's Play – live action / 2D animation – 7 minutes
- 2006 Piece Of Cake – documentary – 24 X 6,5 minutes
- 2008 ST*CK! - live action – 9,45 minutes
- 2008–2011 This or That – live action – 26 X 2,5 minutes
- 2008 The Phantom Of The Cinema – 2D animation / 3D animation – 10 minutes, 46 seconds
- 2010 Pecker – stop motion animation / 2D animation – 3 minutes
- 2010 Ultra Short – 2D animation – 10 seconds
- 2011–2013 Illumations – 2D animation – 20+ x 15 seconds
- 2012 Under The Apple Tree, the book – Illustrated poem. A bedtime a story.
- 2012–2015 Under The Apple Tree – stop motion animation, CGI animation – 20 minutes
- 2013 Rozet – CGI animation – 2 minutes
- 2012–2018 Hieronymus – Original treatment and screenplay for the feature-length animation film about Hieronymus Bosch
- 2006–2014 Outside! – live action / 2D animation – 19 x 5,5 minutes

== Honors ==
=== Awards ===
- Fullproof: Jos Withagen-Eurekaprijs 2006
- Vent: Special mention at the 55th International Filmfestspiele in Berlin, first prize at International Festival of animationfilms BIMINI in Latvia, FIPRESCI award at the International Animated Film Festival in Annecy, Grand Prix best short film at Kyoto Kinder Film Fest, best soundtrack at Espinho Filmfestival Portugal, best music at Neum, Bosnia Hercegovina, best animation in Taiwan.
- Childs Play: Dutch Academy Award 2006
- Piece Of Cake: Prix Danube 2003 at Bratislava. Third prize at Prix Jeunesse 2004
- Phantom Of The Cinema: Grand Prize and trophy at Anim’est international film festival Romania (2009)
- Outside: Second prize at Prix Jeunesse 2008
- Under The Apple Tree: Golden Calf for Best Short Film at Netherlands Film Festival 2015

=== Nominations ===
- Vent: short film and sound design, Nederlands Film Festival 2004
- Fullproof: Golden Statue at the Dutch Academy Award 2005
- ST*CK!: crime & thriller competition Shocking Shorts 2008
- The Phantom Of The Cinema: Dutch entry for the Oscars 2009
- Outside: Cinekid Kinderkast Audience and Jury Award 2007
