= Broken Land =

Single by The Adventures

from the album The Sea of Love
- B-side: "Don't Stand on Me"
- Released: 14 March 1988
- Length: 5:03 (LP Version); 4:07 (Single Edit)
- Label: Elektra
- Songwriter: Pat Gribben
- Producer: Garry Bell

The Adventures singles chronology
"Two Rivers" (1985)	"Broken Land" (1988)	"Drowning in the Sea of Love" (1988)

"Broken Land" is a song by Northern Irish band the Adventures, released in 1988 as the first single from their second album The Sea of Love. It was their biggest hit in the UK, spending 10 weeks on the chart, and reached the top ten in Ireland.

Written by guitarist Pat Gribben, "Broken Land" peaked at No. 20 on the UK Singles Chart. It was also the band's first song to reach the US Billboard Hot 100. A music video was created for the song, which was directed by Mary Lambert. "Broken Land" references experiences of the Troubles.

== Critical reception ==
Reviewing the single, Billboard wrote that the song consists of the band "sing[ing] hopefully about its native land of Ireland in a sweet pop setting." Cashbox thought that "Broken Land" had a "more tuneful" sound than U2 and that it "builds to a terrific chorus that's hooky and memorable." Music & Media characterised it as rather pompous, guitar -driven pop/rock. Predictable, but one that somehow stays in your mind."

== Charts ==
Chart (1988)	Peak position
Australian Singles Chart	45
European Hot 100 Singles (Music & Media)	68
European Airplay (Music & Media)	18
Irish Singles Chart	8
Italian Singles Chart	25
UK Singles (Official Charts)	20
US Billboard Hot 100	95
US Billboard Album Rock Charts	39
US Cash Box Top 100	83

== Music 4 Ukraine version ==
In 2022, a cover version was released as a charity single titled "Heal This Broken Land". This version of "Broken Land" features Mark Shaw of Then Jerico, Nick Heyward, T'Pau's Carol Decker, the Christians, Nathan Moore of Brother Beyond and Doctor and the Medics. On 30 October 2022, the single, credited to Music 4 Ukraine, had reached number 1 on The Heritage Chart, as seen on Talking Pictures TV.
