= Drowning in the Sea of Love (The Adventures song) =

1988 song by The Adventures

Single by The Adventures

from the album The Sea of Love
- B-side: "Stay Away"
- Released: 20 June 1988
- Length: 4:19 (single version); 4:35 (album version)
- Label: Elektra
- Songwriter: Pat Gribben
- Producer: Pete Smith

The Adventures singles chronology
"Broken Land" (1988)	"Drowning in the Sea of Love" (1988)	"One Step from Heaven" (1988)

"Drowning in the Sea of Love" is a song by Northern Irish band the Adventures, which was released in 1988 as the second single from their second studio album The Sea of Love. The song was written by Pat Gribben and produced by Pete Smith. "Drowning in the Sea of Love" peaked at No. 44 on the UK Singles Chart and No. 15 on the Irish Singles Chart.

== Background ==
"Drowning in the Sea of Love" was released as the follow-up to the band's UK breakthrough hit "Broken Land". The follow-up was expected to replicate the single's success, but stalled at No. 44 on the UK Singles Chart after radio play dropped following the Piper Alpha Disaster in July 1988. Lead vocalist Terry Sharpe told Sunday World in September 1988, "The British press started phoning up the BBC saying that they found the record offensive because of the Piper Alpha tragedy, so they stopped playing it."

== Critical reception ==
On its release, Music & Media described the song as a "strong if slightly old-fashioned number" with "excellent singing" and a "strong melodic sensibility". Billboard commented, "Badfinger-flavored track should excite programmers because it's that good." Tim Nicholson of Record Mirror was critical of the song, writing, "It sounds as if it was written on a computer and recorded in an aircraft hangar. If you were hearing it for the first time you'd be able to sing along after the first chorus."

In a review of The Sea of Love, Ferdia MacAnna of the Evening Herald (Dublin) praised the song as "the kind of rumbustious anthem that will have people wailing the chorus from here to Alice Springs". Mario Tarradell of The Miami News commented, "The harmonies are beautifully arranged to create a pop song in the tradition of Burt Bacharach and Jimmy Webb."

== Track listing ==
7" single

1. "Drowning in the Sea of Love" – 4:26
2. "Stay Away" – 4:37

7" single (US promo)

1. "Drowning in the Sea of Love" – 4:19
2. "Drowning in the Sea of Love" – 4:19

12" and CD single

1. "Drowning in the Sea of Love" (LP Version) – 4:35
2. "Stay Away" – 4:37
3. "The Curragh of Kildare" – 2:50

12" single (UK limited edition)

1. "Drowning in the Sea of Love" (LP Version) – 4:35
2. "Stay Away" – 4:37
3. "The Curragh of Kildare" – 2:50
4. "Feel the Raindrops" – 3:44

CD single (US promo)

1. "Drowning in the Sea of Love" (Edit) – 4:26

== Personnel ==
The Adventures

- Terry Sharpe – lead vocals
- Pat Gribben – guitar
- Tony Ayre – bass
- Paul Crowder – drums
- Eileen Gribben, Spud Murphy – vocals

Additional musicians

- Jonathan Whitehead – keyboards
- Paul Fishman – keyboard programming
- Roland Kerridge – electronic percussion
- Brian Kennedy, Billy Vanderpuye, Pete Smith, The McCarthy Sisters – extra backing vocals

Production

- Pete Smith – producer and mixing on "Drowning in the Sea of Love"
- Dietmar Schillinger – engineer and mix engineer on "Drowning in the Sea of Love"
- Jim Scott – mix engineer on "Drowning in the Sea of Love"
- The Adventures – producers of "Stay Away" and "The Curragh of Kildare"
- Bob Sargeant, Steve Harvey, Garry Bell – producers of "Feel the Raindrops"

Other

- DKB London – sleeve design
- Anthony Mascolo – photography
- Richard Baker at Videographics – retouching

== Charts ==
Chart (1988)	Peak position
Ireland (IRMA)	15
UK Singles (Official Charts)	44
West Germany (GfK)	53
