= Savage Beauty =

Cover artwork, by Thomas Yeates, for the premiere issue of Savage Beauty.

Savage Beauty is an ongoing comic book series currently published by Moonstone Books. The series is a re-imaging of the jungle girl genre set in modern-day Africa. Featuring Lacy and Liv Rae, Savage Beauty focuses on these stepsisters contending with issues including human trafficking, child soldiers, gun runners, pirates, and corrupt politicians under the guise of the goddess Anaya.

In each issue of the comic, Savage Beauty offers a free full-page ad to a charitable cause. Future partners will include Invisible Children and Do Good Day.

== Publication history ==
Savage Beauty first saw publication as a 2010 New York Comic Con exclusive comic book ashcan. The book quickly sold out. The series writer Mike Bullock and artists Dan Parent and Tania Del Rio further helped raise awareness at the convention by selling posters and autographing Savage Beauty merchandise.

The first introductory issue of Savage Beauty was an oversized issue featuring 40 pages sold at $2.99, below the standard $3.99 price for most independent comic books. Additionally, the first issue featured a special “Camilla” story, a golden age cover gallery, the “lost” concept art from the 1960s Sheena movie project that was to have starred Raquel Welch and an essay by Michael May of Robot 6.

Thomas Yeates and Dave Hoover provided the covers for the first issue, with Hover's twin covers featuring a unique mirror image depicting the two stepsisters in mirror-like poses.

The first issue also donated a free, full-page ad to Invisible Children's TRI campaign, which focuses on efforts to rescue child soldiers from Joseph Kony's Lord's Resistance Army operating in Uganda, the Sudan and DR Congo at the time of publication.

== Background and creation ==
Inspired by the headlines and news stories from eastern Africa, retropreneur Ed Catto, and his Captain Action partner, Joe Ahearn recruited longtime writer of The Phantom, Mike Bullock. Catto and Ahearn had previously collaborated with Bullock on a Phantom/Captain Action miniseries. Together, the three created Savage Beauty as a way of exploring the fascinating stories from the headlines of African nations while also providing a platform for charitable causes to spread their messages.

== Plot synopsis ==
Savage Beauty is the story of two half-sisters, Lacy and Liv Rae, and their adventures in Africa. Recent UCLA graduates, the sisters are ostensibly on assignment for African Adventures magazine, traveling the continent for feature stories. In reality, guided by the mysterious Mr. Eden, these young women are tasked with righting wrongs on a local basis. Assuming the identity of the mythological goddess Anaya, the sisters use the legend, their wits, and Mr. Eden's vast resources to gain an advantage over wrongdoers.

=== Characters ===
Lacy Rae – This young beauty may seem like a typical Malibu Barbie-type girl, but she's much more. She is an excellent volleyball player and dancer who excelled in her geopolitical studies to graduate at the top of her class with a major in Journalism. Her very nature is to always look ahead which others sometimes misconstrue as impatience or impetuousness. The daughter of the film star Johnny Rae, Lacy has always used her family's wealth to better herself and give back to others.

Liv Rae – An orphan in Kenya when she first met the film star Johnny Rae and his wife Talia, the Rae's adopted Liv after two battling guerrilla contingents destroyed her hometown. Liv is only a few months younger than Lacy. After an initial rocky period, the two very different girls formed a lifelong bond. Liv is a thoughtful and careful planner, very emotive, and sensitive to the needs of others. Although she is a quick thinker and highly adaptable, Liv would much prefer to mentally strategize any plan before springing into action. Liv is a top swimmer and majored in communication arts at UCLA.

Mr. Eden – The mysterious benefactor of Lacy and Liv as well as the caretaker of the Anaya legend, Mr. Eden is a mysterious yet powerful Ethiopian businessman. It has not yet been revealed how Lacy and Liv came to know the mysterious Mr. Eden. Ties between Eden Holdings, LTD and Johnny Rae's film company, Sun Rae Pictures, have been rumored but not confirmed.

Anaya – A mythological goddess whose history is not limited to a single nation or people. As a cross-continental figure, Anaya is known for both her rewarding generosity and her ferocious vengeance. Legend has it that she manifests herself in gold or ebony, doling out blessings on the innocent and pure of heart while wreaking vengeance on the wicked.

Johnny Rae - The quintessential Hollywood action hero made good, Johnny Rae now devotes his time to Sun Rae productions. On the cusp of his fifties, Johnny is in remarkable shape and invites comparisons to Robert Redford.

Lumusi Okoye- Leader of the People's Liberation Army (PLA). Born in Sudan, Lumusi is often called Lumus. Lumus has three scars running from his left ear diagonally across his left cheek, chin, and throat from a leopard attack when he was younger. A product of child soldiery, stories say that Lumus murdered his own parents with a machete at the behest of a Ugandan Warlord who had kidnapped Lumus from his family only two weeks prior. Lumus murdered the warlord he once served and scattered the remnants of the warlord's army before seizing power in the region. He now deals in slavery, drugs, weapons, and anything else that brings him wealth.

Richaud Moreau – After learning the ropes of his uncle's cartel, Richaud decided the organization could be put to better use. Moreau betrayed his uncle, had his uncle arrested, and then took over the cartel his uncle had assembled. Moreau turned to arms trafficking among other things, depending on what offered the easiest, heftiest profit.

The leader of his own cartel and one of the few outsiders given free passage throughout PLA territory, Richaud and Lumus are uneasy partners in many things.

== Reception ==
Savage Beauty was enthusiastically received at its New York Comic Con debut and again by critics with the first issue. Dustin Cabeal of PlayerAffinity.com gave the first issue an 8.9 out of 10 and Barry Reese of All Pulp wrote the first issue was “a remarkable debut”. Ray Tate of Comics Bulletin gave the first issue a 4 out of 5 and Jason Wilkons of Broken Frontier recommended Savage Beauty " to anyone who has a hankering for fast-paced, sultry jungle adventure."

== External links and sources ==
- Bullock, Mike. Mike Bullock talks about Savage Beauty. Interviewed by First Comics News. First Comics News, 25 July 2010. http://www.firstcomicsnews.com/?p=10398
- Bullock, Mike. Savage Beauty #1. Illustrated by Jose Massaroli. Colored by Bob Pedroza. NJ: Moonstone Books, 2011. Print
- ComicBookResource.com Preview
- Moonstone Books Savage Beauty homepage http://moonstonebooks.com/shop/category.aspx?catid=122
- Savage Beauty Facebook page https://www.facebook.com/pages/Savage-Beauty/124993774203124
