= Mike Bullock =

American writer

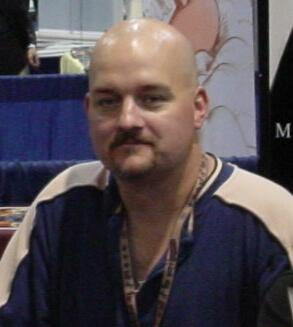
- Bullock in 2006
- Awards: Angoulême International Comics Festival Prix Jeunesse 7-8 ans Discovery Youth Prize (2007), Paper Screen Gem Award for All-Ages Comics (2005), Golden Poet Award (1989)

Mike Bullock is an American author. He began writing fiction, non-fiction and poetry in the 1980s. He worked professionally in the music and comic book industries since 1986 and is best known as the creator of comic book series Lions, Tigers and Bears from Image Comics, and as the regular writer of The Phantom from Moonstone Books.

== Overview ==
His first published fiction work, Lions, Tigers and Bears received favorable reviews from comic book reviewers. Bullock followed that success with another Lions, Tigers and Bears series that arrived in stores in 2006. He took the reins of The Phantom for Moonstone Books with issue 12 of the publisher's first Phantom comic series and continued penning Phantom stories until he had over 40 under his belt, ending his run with the distinction of writing more original Phantom stories than any other American comic book writer.

== Comic book works ==
In 2002, Bullock was employed by Dabel Brothers Productions promotions department. During his one-year employment with Dabel Brothers Productions, Bullock performed the duties of PR Director, as well as Editor on DBPro's original series, Imperial Dragons, and Dreamwave's Warlands. In addition, Bullock developed the second Imperial Dragons series for Dabel Brothers, entitled Imperial Dragons: Road of Honor.

Bullock's first original comics work was Lions, Tigers and Bears initially published by Image Comics. Lions, Tigers and Bears was created by Bullock, then developed with series artist, Jack Lawrence. Bullock's second series under the Image banner was The Gimoles . The second Lions, Tigers and Bears series, also authored by Bullock, began in April 2006. His newest creator-owned series, Timothy and the Transgalactic Towel debuted in September 2009 from Silverline Books, an imprint of Image Comics owned by Image co-founder Jim Valentino.

In late 2005, Bullock became the writer of Moonstone Books' comic series The Phantom. Bullock also contributed a short story featuring the character in Moonstone's Phantom prose anthology, released in the summer of 2007.

Bullock's regular artists on the Phantom were Silvestre Szilagyi, Fernando Peniche and Bob Pedroza. He's also worked with Gabriel Rearte, Carlos Magno and Zeu. Bullock took over the book from writers Ben Raab, Chuck Dixon, and Rafael Nieves. Bullock was given the duties of Phantom Group Editor in early 2009. Bullock ended his Moonstone Phantom run having written more Phantom stories than any other writer in US comic book history.

After Moonstone relinquished the Phantom license in July 2010, Bullock took over as head writer on the Black Bat comics, as well as his own Savage Beauty comic, co-owned with Ed Catto and Joe Ahearn of Captain Action Enterprises. Another creator-owned character, Death Angel, debuted as a back-up story in Phantom: KGB Noir in January 2010 to critical acclaim. The character has since moved on with appearances in the Black Bat graphic novel series, co-starring with the title character, as well as appearing in solo adventures available on the eBook site iPulpfiction.com

In late 2010, Bullock's Lions, Tigers and Bears moved under the Hermes Press banner as the flagship of Curio House, a new all-ages imprint. Lions, Tigers and Bears volume III was initially announced for release in March 2011, with newly formatted reprints of volumes I and II to follow in April. By August 2011, none of the books had appeared on store shelves, however.

2011 brought with it work on the all-new Joe Palooka comic, starring an up-and-coming Mixed Martial Arts fighter nicknamed Joe Palooka. The second Joe Palooka series, dubbed Palooka's Legion of Combat, features several stars of the MMA world in their comic book debut.

Bullock also began work on Fiefdom of Angels, a saga of the first war between good and evil, based on a story created by four-time Grammy Award-winning singer Kevin Max. The Fiefdom of Angels Zero Issue comic book debuted in August 2011.

In May 2012, Bullock was hired to adapt Dead Sea Souls, an end times fiction novel by author Doug K. Pearson, into a 100-page graphic novel for Sozo Media Group. Artist Manny Trembley, known for his work on the Sam Noir and PX graphic novel series, is handling the art for Dead Sea Souls.

== Prose works ==
Bullock had his first prose piece, White Knight, starring The Phantom published in Moonstone Books' Phantom Chronicles volume I in 2007. He followed that with several more Phantom prose pieces including the critically acclaimed Final Roar in the Phantom Generations series. Bullock has also written prose shorts starring Zorro, Black Bat and Death Angel.

At Pulp Ark 2011, Bullock's first full-length novel series was announced from Airship 27, starring Bullock's own sword and sorcery character The Runemaster. His second novel series, starring Bullock's pulp hero Totem - later retitled Xander: Guardian of Worlds - was announced from Pro Se Productions as well.

In May 2011, Moonstone Books announced the first full-length Death Angel prose novel, penned by Bullock, for release in 2012.

May 2012 saw the debut of Xander: Guardian of Worlds, Bullock's latest New Pulp hero, in the pages of Tales of the Rook from Pro Se Press/Reese Unlimited. A full line of Xander novels and short story collections from Pro Se Press was announced at the 2011 Pulp Ark Convention in Batesville, Arkansas.

== Awards ==
- Angoulême International Comics Festival Prix Jeunesse 7-8 ans Discovery Youth Prize at the 2007 Angoulême International Comics Festival
- Paper Screen Gem Award for All-Ages Comics, Broken Frontier, 2005
- Golden Poet Award, International Poetry Society, 1989

== Music credits ==
Prior to developing his writing career, Bullock sang and played guitar in several extreme metal bands from 1986 to 1997. His first band, XLR8, featured guitarist Pat Bohan (Machinery), bassist Bill Kowalski and drummer Jim Chaney (Jimmie's Chicken Shack, Machinery). In late 1988 Bullock joined IronChrist, who toured and recorded for Restless Records for several years before disbanding in 1991. After Ironchrist, Bullock replaced Mark Strassburg (Possessed), in fellow Restless Records band Indestroy, only to see them disband before tracks from the third Indestroy album, with music primarily written by Jeff Parsons (Wretched), Rob 'Cougin' Brannigan and lyrics by Bullock were recorded. Bullock, Parsons and ex-Indestroy drummer Gus Basiliko went on to form Wretched, but Bullock moved to LA soon after and formed Eulogy with George Moreno and Nathan Rivera (Dark Realm Records).

Upon returning to DC in 1995, Bullock formed the death metal band Scab. This marked the first time Bullock not only wrote all the band's music, but handled the majority of the guitar work while sharing the vocals with the drummer, known only as "The Evil One."

Bullock took a leave of absence from the music world in 2000, after a brief stint with .357, a reformation of Eulogy.

In December 2011, Bullock, Bohan and Chaney set about resurrecting an old band of theirs known as Machinery, with the intent of releasing a new album in 2013.

On May 8, 2012, Divebomb Records re-released Ironchrist's second album in a deluxe CD format.

In late 2012, Bullock returned to song writing with his own band Open Tomb, marking the first time since Scab that he would be responsible for all the songwriting as well as guitars, bass, drums and vocals.

- Ironchrist - lead vocals
- Indestroy - lead vocals, manager

== Bibliography ==
=== Alias Comics ===
- Gimoles #1 (creator, writer) (2005)

=== Arcana Studio ===
- Grunts War is Hell (writer) (2008)

=== Archie ===
- SONIC X #21 starring Sonic the Hedgehog (writer) (2006)

=== Hermes Press ===
- Lions, Tigers and Bears volume III (creator, writer) (2011)

=== Image Comics ===
- Lions, Tigers and Bears volume I (creator, writer) (2005)
- Lions, Tigers and Bears volume II (creator, writer) (2006)
- Secrets of the Seasons: The Gimoles volume I (creator, writer) (2008)
- POPGUN volume I: Tiger-Man (creator, writer) (2008)

=== iPulp Fiction ===
- Death Angel: Hung Jury (creator, writer) (2011)
- Death Angel: In My Dominion (creator, writer) (2011)

=== Moonstone Books ===
- Air Fighters Iron Ace 1 & 2
- Air Vixens 1
- The Phantom #12-26, Annual 1 & 2 (writer) (2005–2008)
- The Phantom Chronicles White Knight (writer) (2007)
- The Phantom Chronicles Bad Medicine (story/plot by Ed Rhoades) (2007)
- Zorro Enemy of my Enemy (co-writer with Matthew Baugh) (2008)
- The Phantom: Ghost Who Walks #1-12, (writer) (2009–2010)
- The Phantom: Generations #8 (writer) (2009)
- The Phantom: Generations #14 (writer) (2010)
- The Phantom: KGB Noir #1-6 (writer) (2010)
- The Phantom: Chronicles II I of the Storm (2010)
- The Phantom: Captain Action #1-2 (writer) (2010)
- Death Angel: Yea Thou I Walk (writer/creator) (2010)
- Black Bat: Black Death #1+ (writer) (2010)
- Captain Future: Voices (writer) (2010)
- Savage Beauty #1-3+ (writer/co-creator) (2010–present)

=== Silverline Books ===
- Timothy and the Transgalactic Towel (creator, writer) (2009)

=== Ronin Studios ===
- Tigerman (creator, writer) (2005)
- Gimoles: Where The River Flows (creator, writer) (2005)
