= Lions and Tigers and Bears =

Studio album by The Adventures
- Released: March 1993
- Recorded: 1992–1993
- Genre: Alternative rock
- Label: Polydor
- Producer: Pat Collier; Stephen Lipson on "Monday Monday"

The Adventures chronology
Trading Secrets with the Moon (1990)	Lions and Tigers and Bears (1993)

Professional ratings
Review scores
Source	Rating
AllMusic	1.5/5 stars

Lions and Tigers and Bears is the fourth album by rock band The Adventures, released in 1993. The album title was adopted by the band at the suggestion of Pat and Eileen Gribben's daughter (according to journalist Malcolm Dome, who wrote the sleeve notes for the reissued version of the album mentioned below).

The album contains the minor hit "Raining All Over the World", signalling the end of their chart activity. The follow-up single "Monday Monday" (a cover of The Mamas and Papas hit) stalled outside the official UK top 75 at No. 83. The album was panned by critics, with AllMusic also giving it 1.5 out of 5 stars. The album failed to chart and was the group's last studio release until the release of the comeback album Once More with Feeling in March 2025.

The album was remastered and reissued in May 2011 by Cherry Red Records, who had previously re-released the band's debut album Theodore and Friends in July 2009. This release includes four bonus tracks, which were all B-Sides to the two tracks released as singles.

== Track listing ==
All songs written by Pat Gribben, except where noted

1. "Monday Monday" (John Phillips) 4.19
2. "Marianne" (Pat Gribben, Serge Gainsbourg) 5.31
3. "Raining All Over the World" 4.26
4. "Come the Day" 4.08
5. "I Don't Want to Play This Game" 4.03
6. "The Only World I Know" 4.36
7. "This Crazy Heart" 5.05
8. "Impossible You" 2.21
9. "I Really Don't Mind" 4.11
10. "Here It Comes Again" 4.13
11. "Too Late for Heaven" 3.50
12. "Say I'm Sorry" 4.04
13. "Perfect Day" 5.14

Bonus tracks on 2011 re-issue:

1. "Straight to Heaven" 3.50 (the same track as "Too Late for Heaven" as on the main album)
2. "In the Garden" 4.00
3. "Lost Train" (Pat Gribben, Terry Sharpe) 4.20
4. "Queen of Sorrow" 4.08
