= 1 (2013 film) =

- Film poster
- Directed by: Paul Crowder
- Written by: Mark Monroe
- Screenplay by: Mark Monroe
- Produced by: Michael Shevloff; Nigel Sinclair
- Narrated by: Michael Fassbender
- Music by: Matter
- Production companies: Spitfire Pictures; Flat-Out Films; Diamond Docs
- Distributed by: Exclusive Media
- Release date: October 1, 2013 (US)
- Running time: 112 minutes
- Country: United States
- Language: English

1 (also known as 1: Life On The Limit) is a 2013 documentary film directed by Paul Crowder and narrated by Michael Fassbender. The film traces the history of Formula One auto racing from its early years, in which some seasons had multiple fatalities, to the 1994 death of Ayrton Senna, the sport's most recent death at the time of production. Extensive and often rare archival footage is used throughout.

== Synopsis ==
The film opens with the 1996 Australian Grand Prix in Melbourne, where Martin Brundle survived a spectacular crash at turn 3. After receiving clearance from race doctor Sid Watkins, Brundle hopped into a spare car to drive in the restarted race. The film then takes a brief look at the early days of Formula One racing in the 1950s, which was essentially a resumption of prewar Grand Prix racing. In 1958, the year world champion Juan Manuel Fangio retired, the FIA announced the Formula One World Constructors' Championship for the makers of the winning car. This led to a wave of British privateer teams, nicknamed "Garagistas" by Enzo Ferrari, dominating the Championship. Most notable was Team Lotus, led by Colin Chapman. (Note: Chapman's innovative designs and the talent of Jim Clark saw the team becoming influential in the evolving Formula One development.)

In 1966, the FIA doubled the engine size from 1.5 to 3 liters, which saw the cars race markedly faster on tracks and facilities unchanged since before World War II. This resulted in several fatal accidents. The death of Chapman's star driver Jim Clark at the Hockenheimring in a Formula Two race in 1968 was a turning point: several drivers, including Clark's Lotus replacement, Jochen Rindt, and the Grand Prix Drivers' Association (GPDA), began questioning the sport's safety. Rindt himself was killed during practice at the 1970 Italian Grand Prix; he was posthumously awarded the driver's championship that year.

Jackie Stewart, three-time champion and Chairman of the GPDA, used his position to push for improved safety and track facilities, including safety barriers and mandatory seat belts. This caused some opposition with other drivers, most notably Jacky Ickx, Stewart's opponent on the track at the time. Stewart's influence led to boycotts of some races, including the 1971 Belgian Grand Prix. Despite his efforts, drivers continued to be killed, including Stewart's own teammate, François Cevert, at the 1973 United States Grand Prix.

Meanwhile, new drivers and teams made their way into Formula One. Hesketh Racing, led by the extravagant Lord Hesketh, entered Formula One in 1973 with their Formula Two driver James Hunt. Despite their rather blasé appearance, they performed surprisingly well including winning the 1975 Dutch Grand Prix ahead of Ferrari's Niki Lauda. When Hesketh was forced to close at the end of 1975, Hunt went to McLaren, which placed both him and Lauda as favorites to win the 1976 Championship. (Note: The 1976 season was dramatic, for Lauda led for the first half, but Hunt gained ground on Lauda despite being disqualified from two races (the Spanish Grand Prix victory was later reinstated). Lauda almost died from a fiery accident at the German Grand Prix at the notorious Nürburgring, but managed to keep his championship alive by taking fourth at the Italian Grand Prix almost a month after his accident. At the last race at a rain-soaked Japanese Grand Prix, Lauda voluntarily retired from the race, allowing Hunt to win the championship by finishing third.)

In 1978, Bernie Ecclestone, head of the Formula One Constructors Association, hired Professor Sid Watkins as the official Formula One 'race doctor.' Initially distrusted by track officials, Watkins' influence on the sport increased after the death of Ronnie Peterson at the 1978 Italian Grand Prix; at that race, the Italian officials prevented him from treating Peterson at the scene. (Note: Watkins was later named President of a Formula One Medical Commission in 1981, which implemented permanent on-track medical facilities amongst other medical advancements.)

Following Peterson's accident, Formula One remained relatively fatality free until the 1994 San Marino Grand Prix, which saw the deaths of Roland Ratzenberger and Ayrton Senna in separate accidents.

In the aftermath, the FIA President Max Mosley (who drove in the race Jim Clark was killed in, and was head of March Engineering in the 1970s), formed the Advisory Expert Group chaired by Sid Watkins to research and improve safety in motor racing. As a result of the changes implemented by this Group, Formula One did not experience a driver fatality until 2015, when driver Jules Bianchi succumbed to a head injury nine months after a crash during the 2014 Japanese Grand Prix.

== Featured cast ==
=== Interviewees ===
- Mario Andretti
- John Barnard
- Jane Birbeck
- Herbie Blash
- Martin Brundle
- Jenson Button
- Ron Dennis
- Bernie Ecclestone
- Emerson Fittipaldi
- Lewis Hamilton
- Lord Hesketh
- Brigitte Hill
- Damon Hill
- Freddie Hunt
- Jacky Ickx
- Eddie Jordan
- Niki Lauda
- Brett Lunger
- Nigel Mansell
- John Miles
- Max Mosley
- Jody Scheckter
- Michael Schumacher
- Jackie Stewart
- Sally Stewart
- John Surtees
- Sebastian Vettel
- Sid Watkins
- John Watson

=== Archive footage ===
- François Cevert
- Colin Chapman
- Jim Clark
- Enzo Ferrari
- Bette Hill
- James Hunt
- Robert Kubica
- Princess Grace of Monaco
- Bruce McLaren
- Jochen Rindt
- Ayrton Senna

== Production ==
Associate producer, Jonathan Bracey-Gibbon had the idea for creating a "safety documentary" about Formula One and developed the script with Michael Shevloff, though production did not begin until 2008. In addition to narration by Michael Fassbender, the documentary features on-screen interviews with Formula One champions Mario Andretti, Jenson Button, Lewis Hamilton, Damon Hill, Jacky Ickx, Niki Lauda, Nigel Mansell, Michael Schumacher, Jackie Stewart, and Sebastian Vettel. Other interviewees include Bernie Ecclestone, head of the Formula One Constructors Association (FOCA), Max Mosley, legal adviser to FOCA, and Sid Watkins, head of the Formula One on-track medical team. The majority of the interviews were completed in 2010 and 2011.

== Release ==
The documentary premiered on January 10, 2014 at the Empire, Leicester Square in London, United Kingdom. In 2015 the sport suffered its first fatality in over twenty years when Jules Bianchi died on July 17, 2015 due to injuries sustained in his crash at the 2014 Japanese Grand Prix.

=== Home media ===
1 was released on DVD and Blu-ray on January 28, 2014 in the United States and Canada and on March 17 in the United Kingdom. The Australian Blu-ray release and some DVDs are bundled with Rush.

== Critical reception ==
Mike McCahill of The Guardian gave the documentary 4 stars out of 5, stating, "This F1 history finds its narrative impetus in the trade-off between crowd pleasing speed and concern for driver survival". McCahill praised the timing and contextual presentation, and described the film as "surprisingly critical." Mark Kermode of The Guardian found "gripping" the mixture of archive footage and modern-day interviews. Daniel Johnson of The Telegraph considered the film a "compelling" depiction, noting that Formula One racing went beyond "sport" to "high-stakes theatre" in the fifteen years following 1967, a period in which 19 drivers died. Charlotte O'Sullivan of the London Evening Standard described the movie as "pure bliss for Formula 1 fans." The film's star power was highlighted by Ian Freer of Empire. The Independent described the film as "well-researched", but noted its "morbid" and "depressing" elements. Bleacher Report featured columnist Matthew Walthert described the film as an inspiring tragedy told by the living about those who died while quickly driving high-powered and potentially lethal "mobile bombs." The Independent notes the film graphically documents the improvement of safety in the sport.

Fassbender's narration was described as both "sonorous" and "laconic". Ecclestone and Mosley were lauded by reviewers for their "genuine determination" and for their roles as "self-styled guardian angels".

Kermode noted the timing of the film, which opened in the shadow of Senna (2010) and Rush (2013). The film is praised for complementing them both. The Independent described the film as produced alongside Rush. Walthert claimed the film was a response to Senna, which "raised the bar for F1 filmmaking" as much as its predecessor. The archival footage is said to be familiar to viewers of those films, but it is said to be "moving" and "smartly marshalled". British GQ critic Rebecca Cox described the footage as "100 per cent real and utterly terrifying".
