= Amy Gutierrez =

American sports journalist and writer

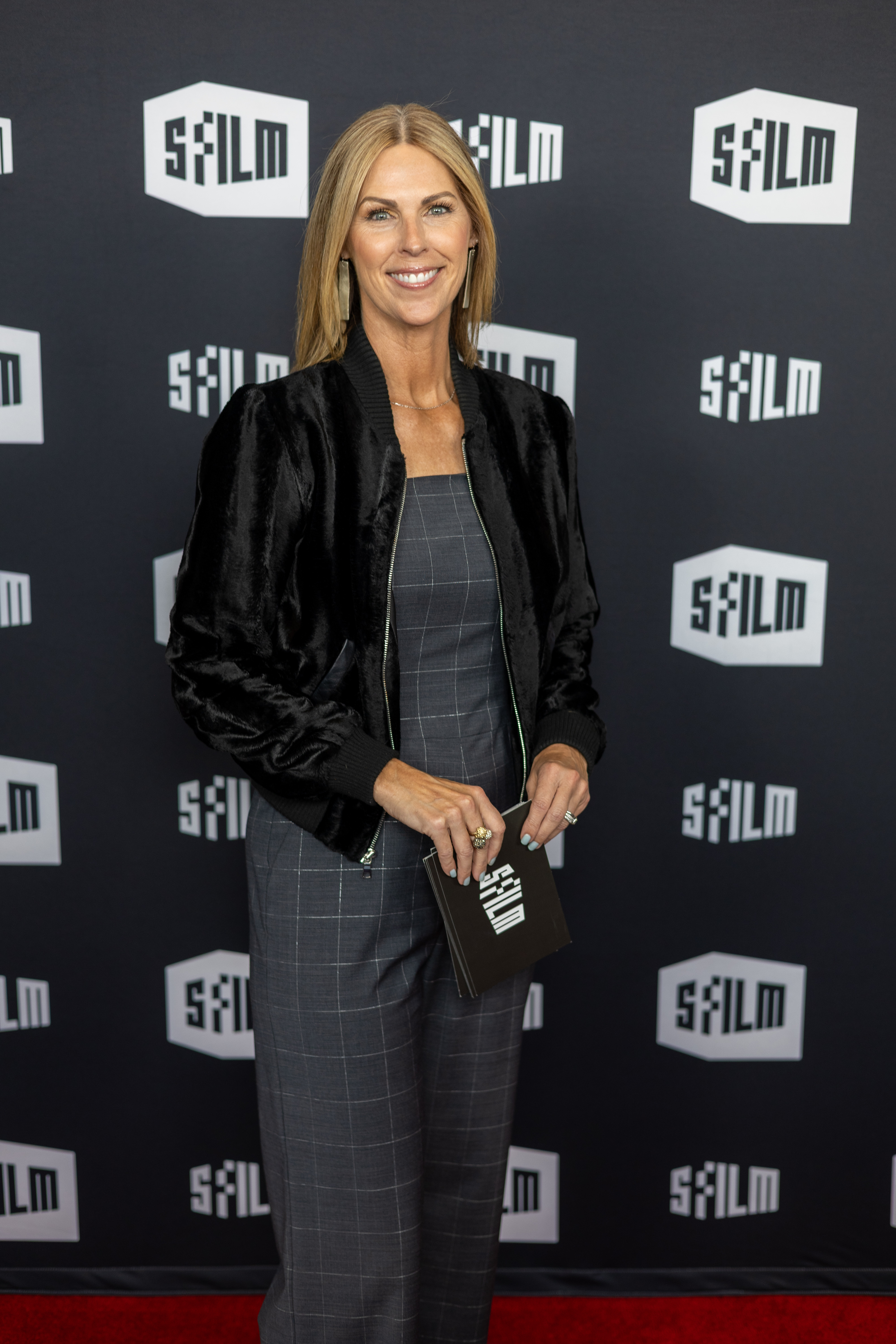
- Gutierrez at the SFFILM Festival in 2026
- Born: Amy U'Ren; November 14, 1973 (age 52); San Mateo, California, U.S.
- Other name: Amy G.
- Education: University of California at Davis
- Occupation: Sports journalist
- Known for: San Francisco Giants field reporter

Amy Gutierrez (born November 14, 1973), also known as Amy G, is an American sports journalist and writer.

== Life and education ==
Amy U'Ren Gutierrez was born in San Mateo, California and raised in Petaluma, California. She attended La Tercera Elementary School, Kenilworth Junior High and Casa Grande High School. At Casa Grande she played softball, basketball, and volleyball. Gutierrez wanted to be a broadcast journalist. She graduated from the University of California, Davis in 1995 with degrees in rhetoric and communications. While at Davis she performed in the school's concert band, playing the flute. She is married to sports journalist Paul Gutierrez. They live in Petaluma and are parents of a daughter named Grace Gutierrez and a son.

== Career ==
After graduation, Gutierrez first moved to Washington, D.C. before relocating to work as a television producer for Foxsports while living in Los Angeles. While there, she filled in for a sick co-worker and appeared on air. She returned to the San Francisco Bay Area and worked as a basketball journalist, hosting her own television program. Around 2009, Gutierrez became the sideline reporter for the NBC Sports Bay Area, for whom she covered the San Francisco Giants. She also contributes to G-Mag and has her own webcast called Amy G's Giants Xclusive. Beginning in 2026, Gutierrez became the Co-GM of the RedPocket Mobiles, a permanently away travel team playing out of the Pioneer Baseball League.

Gutierrez, who writes all her own stories, reports on the "emotional, nontechnical side of the game," in order to attract both frequent and occasional game viewers. She reviews her stories with other reporters prior to producing them.

=== Smarty Marty's Got Game ===
In 2012, Gutierrez was asked to write a book about baseball for children ages 6–9 by the Cameron + Company publishing house. The book, Smarty Marty's Got Game, was published in 2013. It was illustrated by Adam McCauley. The title character, Marty, is based upon Amy's mother and grandmother and is named after Gutierrez's grandmother who died just before Gutierrez started writing the book. Marty is a little girl who teaches her little brother about baseball, emulating the relationship of Gutierrez's own children.

== Baseball Management ==
The Giants ended Gutierrez's contract in December 2025 and, the following year, she became the co-manager of the Pioneer Baseball League traveling team the RedPocket Mobiles. She is responsible for contracting, scheduling, and travel arrangements. The team does not have a home stadium and will play all 96 of their games at other team's stadiums.

== Publications ==
- Gutierrez, Amy and Adam McCauley. Smarty Marty's Got Game. Petaluma: Cameron + Company (2013). ISBN 1937359514
- Gutierrez, Amy and Ariana Killora. Smarty Marty Steps Up Her Game. Petaluma: Cameron Kids (2017). ISBN 1944903089
- Gutierrez, Amy and Anika Orrock. Smarty Marty Takes The Field. Harry N. Abrams (2024). ISBN 1949480526
