= The Adventures =

Defunct Northern Irish rock/pop band

- Origin: Belfast, Northern Ireland
- Genres: New wave, pop rock, alternative rock, Irish folk (later work)
- Years active: 1984–1993, 2007, 2009, 2019–present
- Labels: Chrysalis, Elektra, Polydor Cherry Red Records
- Past members: Terry Sharpe; Pat Gribben; Eileen Gribben; Gerard 'Spud' Murphy; Paul Crowder; Jonathan Whitehead; Tony Ayre (deceased)

The Adventures are a Northern Irish rock/pop band, formed in Belfast in 1984 who had a number of hits during the 1980s and early 1990s.

The band moved to London where they signed to Chrysalis Records and released their first single in 1984. Following their debut album, the group moved to Elektra Records and scored their biggest hit, "Broken Land". Written by guitarist Pat Gribben, it reached number 20 in the UK Singles Chart, and became the most played song on BBC Radio 1 in 1988.

The band were actively recording and touring from 1984 up until 1993, but despite being managed by the highly-influential Simon Fuller, The Adventures never achieved a significant commercial breakthrough.

The band have reformed several times to play live gigs and festivals in Belfast, including in 1997, twice in the 2000s, and in 2019. They have performed at The Empire, Belfast for three consecutive years; 2023, 2024 & 2025. After more than 30 years a new studio album was released in 2025.

== History ==
Lead vocalist Terry Sharpe and guitarist Pat Gribben first worked together when in 1978 they joined punk band The Starjets. The band experienced limited success and disbanded in the early 1980s. In 1982, Sharpe appeared in the Bananarama video for "Shy Boy" and co-wrote several tracks on their debut album Deep Sea Skiving.

In early 1984, Sharpe and Gribben formed The Adventures with Gribben's wife, Eileen, Gerard Murphy, Tony Ayre and Paul Crowder, performing their first show in February 1984 in North London. They signed to Chrysalis Records and were taken on by upcoming manager Simon Fuller, who saw them achieve much publicity and promotion in the music press, including an appearance on BBC's Crackerjack. Despite this promising start, their debut single, "Another Silent Day", released in the summer of 1984, barely scraped into the chart. Further singles were released, "Send My Heart", "Feel the Raindrops", and "Two Rivers", all of which were minor hits in the UK Chart, but no major breakthrough was achieved. Their debut album, Theodore and Friends, was released in 1985 while the group were on a world tour supporting Tears for Fears. It received much critical acclaim, but again no significant sales.

The band lay low for the next two years. During this time, main songwriter Pat Gribben composed some new songs for a second album and the band left Chrysalis Records and were picked up by Elektra Records. With another burst of promotion and heavy airplay, their new single "Broken Land" became their only significant hit, reaching No. 20 in the UK Singles Chart and spending 10 weeks on the chart. It was quickly followed up by the album, The Sea of Love, which reached No. 30 and also remained on the charts for 10 weeks. The follow-up singles, "Drowning in the Sea of Love" and "One Step From Heaven", stalled at No. 44 and No. 82 respectively, though the album was certified Silver (for 60,000 copies sold) by the BPI in 1989, a year after its release.

The band combined pop/rock with a folk music sound for their third studio album, Trading Secrets with the Moon. Released in early 1990, along with a couple of singles, the album failed to capitalise on their earlier success and only appeared briefly on the UK Albums Chart, stalling at No. 64. This ended their contract with Elektra.

With another rethink and now down to a quartet, The Adventures returned in 1992 with the single "Raining All Over the World". Now signed to Polydor Records, the song reached No. 68, and was to be the group's final chart appearance. A fourth album, Lions and Tigers and Bears, was released in 1993, produced by ex-Vibrators bassist Pat Collier at London's Greenhouse Recording Studios. Despite featuring a new single, a contemporary reworking of the classic 1960s hit "Monday Monday", the album met with a tepid response and failed to chart. The group were then dropped by Polydor, and broke up soon after.

Pat Gribben has continued to write songs, and has worked with singer Ryan Molloy. Terry Sharpe spent some years performing in a cover band, The Dead Handsomes. The Adventures regrouped briefly in 2007 for some gigs in Belfast, but no major reunion was ever organised. They regrouped again in 2009 to perform further small scale gigs in Belfast, as well as appearances at the Time To Be Proud and Féile an Phobail festivals during the summer.

Former bass player Tony Ayre died on 20 December 2009.

On 5 January 2019, The Adventures (featuring Sharpe along with Pat and Eileen Gribben) played a show at The Empire, Belfast, with The Starjets reforming later on in the year.

A new The Adventures studio album, entitled Once More with Feeling, was released on 28 March 2025 on Cherry Red Records.

== Band members ==
- Terry Sharpe – lead vocals (born 11 September 1956)
- Pat Gribben – guitar
- Eileen Gribben – vocals, violin
- Gerry "Spud" Murphy – guitar, percussion, vocals
- Tony Ayre – bass (died 2009)
- Paul Crowder – drums
- Jonathan Whitehead – keyboards

== Discography ==
=== Studio albums ===
Year	Album	Chart positions		
Year	Album	UK	AUS	US
1985	Theodore and Friends	-	-	-
1988	The Sea of Love	30	-	144
1990	Trading Secrets with the Moon	64	137	-
1993	Lions and Tigers and Bears	-	-	-
2025	Once More with Feeling	-	-	-

=== Singles ===
Year	Single	Chart positions						Album
Year	Single	UK	IRE	US	GER	ITA	AUS	Album
1984	"Another Silent Day"	71	-	-	-	-	-	Theodore and Friends
1984	"Send My Heart"	62	-	-	24	44	92	Theodore and Friends
1985	"Feel the Raindrops"	58	-	-	-	-	-	Theodore and Friends
1985	"Two Rivers"	96	-	-	-	-	-	Theodore and Friends
1988	"Broken Land"	20	8	95	-	25	45	The Sea of Love
1988	"Drowning in the Sea of Love"	44	15	-	53	-	-	The Sea of Love
1988	"One Step from Heaven"	82	-	-	-	-	-	The Sea of Love
1989	"Washington Deceased"	102	-	-	-	-	-	Trading Secrets with the Moon
1990	"Your Greatest Shade of Blue"	109	-	-	-	-	-	Trading Secrets with the Moon
1990	"Bright New Morning"	-	-	-	-	-	-	
1992	"Raining All Over the World"	68	-	-	-	-	-	Lions and Tigers and Bears
1993	"Monday Monday"	83	-	-	-	-	-	Lions and Tigers and Bears
