= Martin Fondse =

Dutch pianist and composer

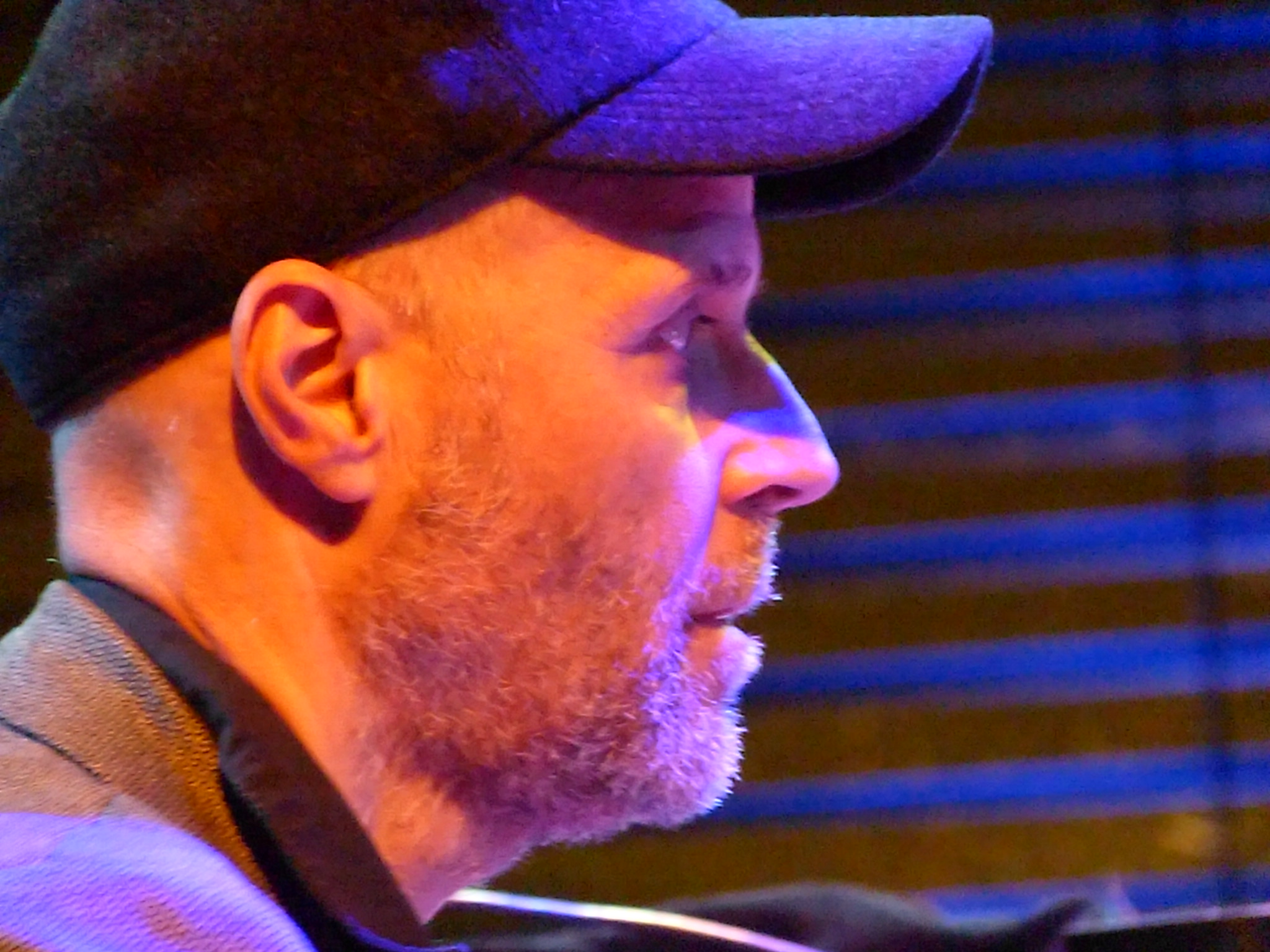
Martin Fondse (2020)

Martin Fondse (February 20, 1967, Bergen Op Zoom) is a Dutch pianist and composer. He also plays the vibrandoneon, the baroque version of the melodica. He is a composer and arranger in the fields of jazz and contemporary music and he leads the Martin Fondse Orchestra (formerly known as 'Starvinsky Orkestar').

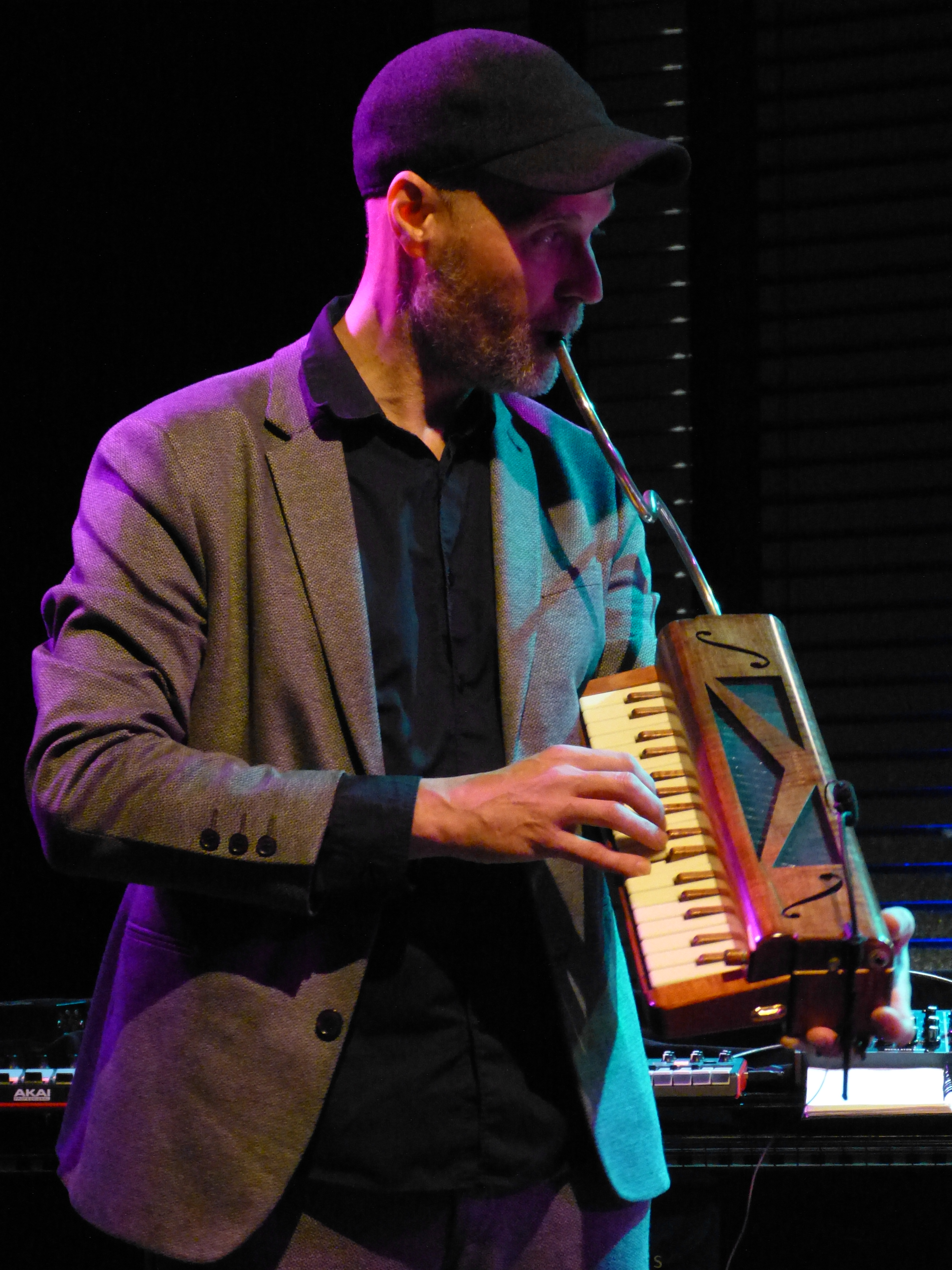
Martin Fondse, playing the vibrandoneon

== Discography ==
- Fragrant Moondrops (Basta, 2009)
- XLJazz 2010 (Buitenkunst, 2010)
- Testimoni (Basta, 2012)

== Filmography ==
- 2004 Vent - Erik van Schaaik (Music: Martin Fondse)
- 2007 Soufiane - Natasja André de la Porte (Music: Martin Fondse)
- 2007 Dennis P. - Pieter Kuijpers (arrangement title song: Martin Fondse)
- 2008 The Phantom of the Cinema- Erik van Schaaik (Music: Martin Fondse)
- 2010 Witte Hond - Natasja André de la Porte (Music: Martin Fondse)
- 2010 Pecker - Erik van Schaaik (Music: Martin Fondse)
- 2010 Overmorgen - Natasja André de la Porte (Music: Martin Fondse)
- 2011 My Long Distance Friend - Carina Molier (additional music: Martin Fondse)
- 2011 Audition - Udo Prinsen (Music: Eric Vloeimans & Martin Fondse)
- 2013 Fallin' Floyd - Albert 't Hooft & Paco Vink (Music: Martin Fondse)

== Awards ==
- 2014 Best Short Film Adult Jury & Young Jury Young About International Film festival, Bologna. Fallin' Floyd - (Albert 't Hooft & Paco Vink Music: Martin Fondse)
- 2013 VNAP Vakprijs Holland Animation Film Festival Fallin' Floyd - (Albert 't Hooft & Paco Vink Music: Martin Fondse)
- 2013 Audience Award Holland Animation Film Festival, Fallin' Floyd - (Albert 't Hooft & Paco Vink Music: Martin Fondse)
- 2013 Best 2D Animation Neum Animated Film Festival, Fallin' Floyd - (Albert 't Hooft & Paco Vink Music: Martin Fondse)
- 2012 Edison Award Jazz National
- 2011 Best International Film Black Rock Animation Film Festival, Dublin, Ireland - Audition (Director: Udo Prinsen Music: Eric Vloeimans & Martin Fondse)
- 2011 Best Animation Award Leids Film Festival - Audition (Director: Udo Prinsen Music: Eric Vloeimans & Martin Fondse)
- 2009 Dutch entry for the Oscars, Animated Shorts (USA) - Phantom of the Cinema (Direction: Erik van Schaaik Music: Martin Fondse)
- 2009 Grand Prize and Trophy at Anim’est international film festival Romania - Phantom of the Cinema (Direction: Erik van Schaaik Music: Martin Fondse)
- 2009 Winner of the Grand Prize and Trophy at Anim’est international film festival Romania - Phantom of the Cinema (Direction: Erik van Schaaik Music: Martin Fondse)
- 2007 Award Francisco Garcia De Paso, Huesca International Film Festival (ES) - Soufiane (director: Natasja André de la Porte Music: Martin Fondse)
- 2006 International Working Animated Film Festival RFAF 2006 (Bosnia- Herzegovina) - Best music (Vent)
- 2005 Cinanima Espinho 2005 (Portugal) - Best music (Vent)
- 2004 Fipresci award, Annecy, France - Vent (Direction: Erik van Schaaik Music: Martin Fondse)
- 2004 1st prize at the International Festival of animationfilms Bimini in Latvia Vent (Direction: Erik van Schaaik Music: Martin Fondse)
- 2004 Nominated best short film and best sound design at the Holland Film Meeting 2004 - Vent (Direction: Erik van Schaaik Music: Martin Fondse)
- 2004 Grand Prix for best short film at The Kyoto Kinder Film Fest - Vent (Direction: Erik van Schaaik Music: Martin Fondse)
- 2002 Nominated for Bird Award, artist deserving wider recognition, North Sea Jazz festival
- 1998 2nd Prize Euror' Jazz Big Band Association, Paris, France
- 1996 1st Prize Julius Hemphill Award (Jazz Composers Alliance), Boston, USA
- 1993 3rd Prize Euro Jazz Contest, Hoeilaart, Belgium

== Composition commissions ==
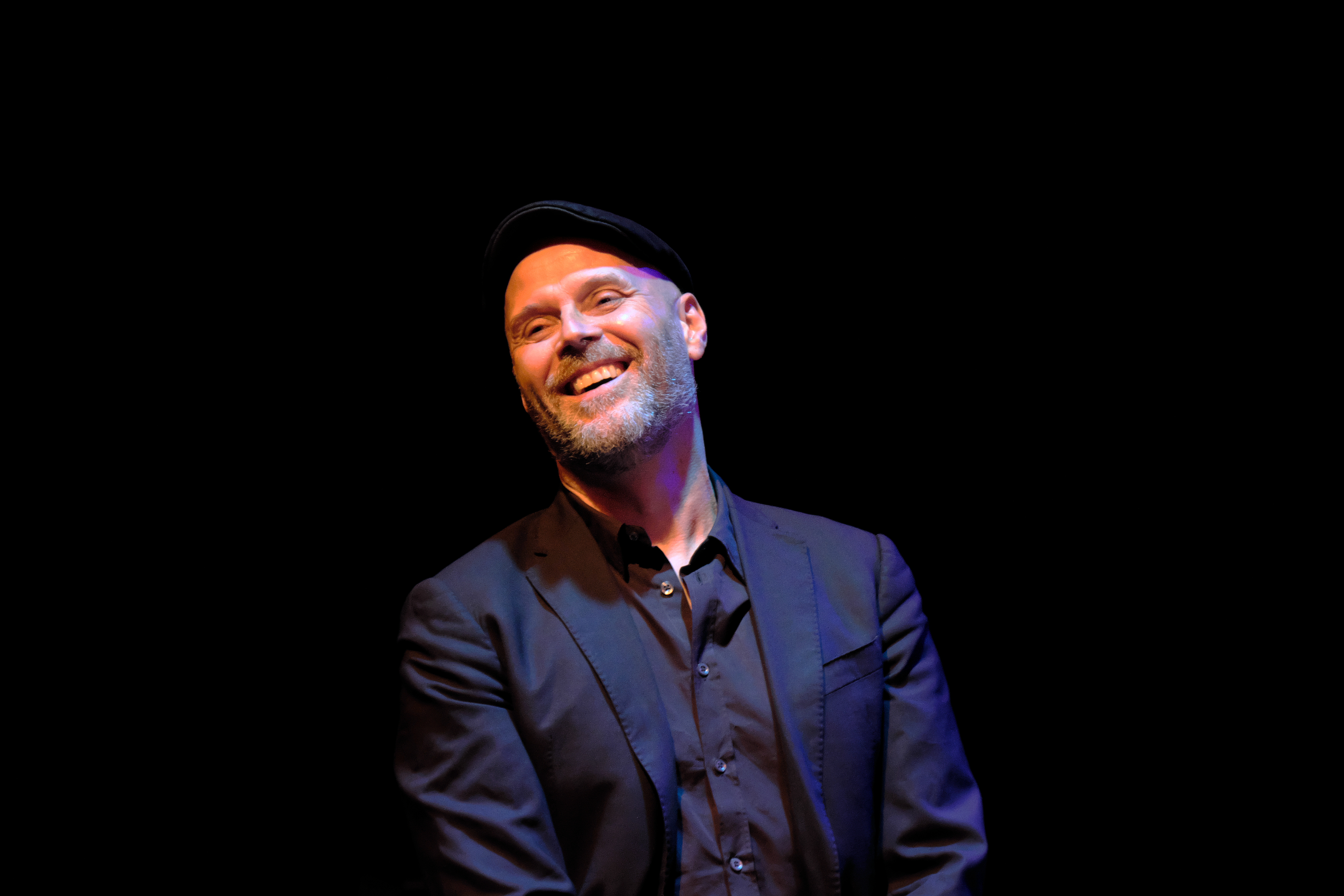
Martin Fondse 2017

- 2014 'Rosefire': new songs for mezzo-soprano, trumpet, piano & string quartet
- 2014 ZomerOrkest Nederland - Twin Moon Rising
- 2014 World Trombone Quartet - new work
- 2014 Matangi Quartet - new work
- 2013 'The Bridge' for Martin Fondse Orchestra & Lenine: new instrumental music and arrangements of Lenine's favourites
- 2011 'Far, East, South' for Doelenensemble Rotterdam & Steffen Schorn
- 2010 New Composition for Clazz Ensemble, in collaboration with Jacob TV
- 2009 'Uncle M.' for Royal Concertgebouw Orchestra & Eric Vloeimans
- 2009 '4 Seasons in 1 Day', composition for Doudou N'Diaye Rose, Saxophone Quartet (Artvark), Drums (Peter Erskine), Bass (Eric van der Westen), Percussion Ensemble (Anumadutchi)
- 2009 Half/Half for Gelders Fanfare Orkest & eric Vloeimans
- 2009 Bollywood Medley for Amstel Saxophone Quartet & [Niti Ranjan Biswas]
- 2009 Theatre Music for Boogaerdt/vanderSchoot: Martha Loves George
- 2008 Composition for 'Sintonize', project of modern dance company Cisne Negro, São Paulo and Silent Disco (NL)
- 2006 'Primer Dark' for Symphonic Orchestra & Clarinet Solo for Holland Symfonia (NL) & Claudio Puntin
- 2006 'Swinging Old Lady' for Nederlandse Muziekdagen - Work for Tania kross, Izaline Callister & Metropole Orchestra
- 2005 'Fester' for Doelenensemble Rotterdam & Eric Vloeimans
- 2004 'City Lights', Suite for Jazz Orchestra & Trumpet Solofor HR Big Band, Frankfurt (De) & Eric Vloeimans
- 2003 'All in the Family', composition commission from Jazz international Rotterdam (NL)
- 2003 'Cottacatya!', Suite for Jazz Orchestra for HR Big Band, Frankfurt (De)
- 2002 'Cactus', The Annual Composition Commission from North Sea Jazz Festival (NL)

== Collaborations ==
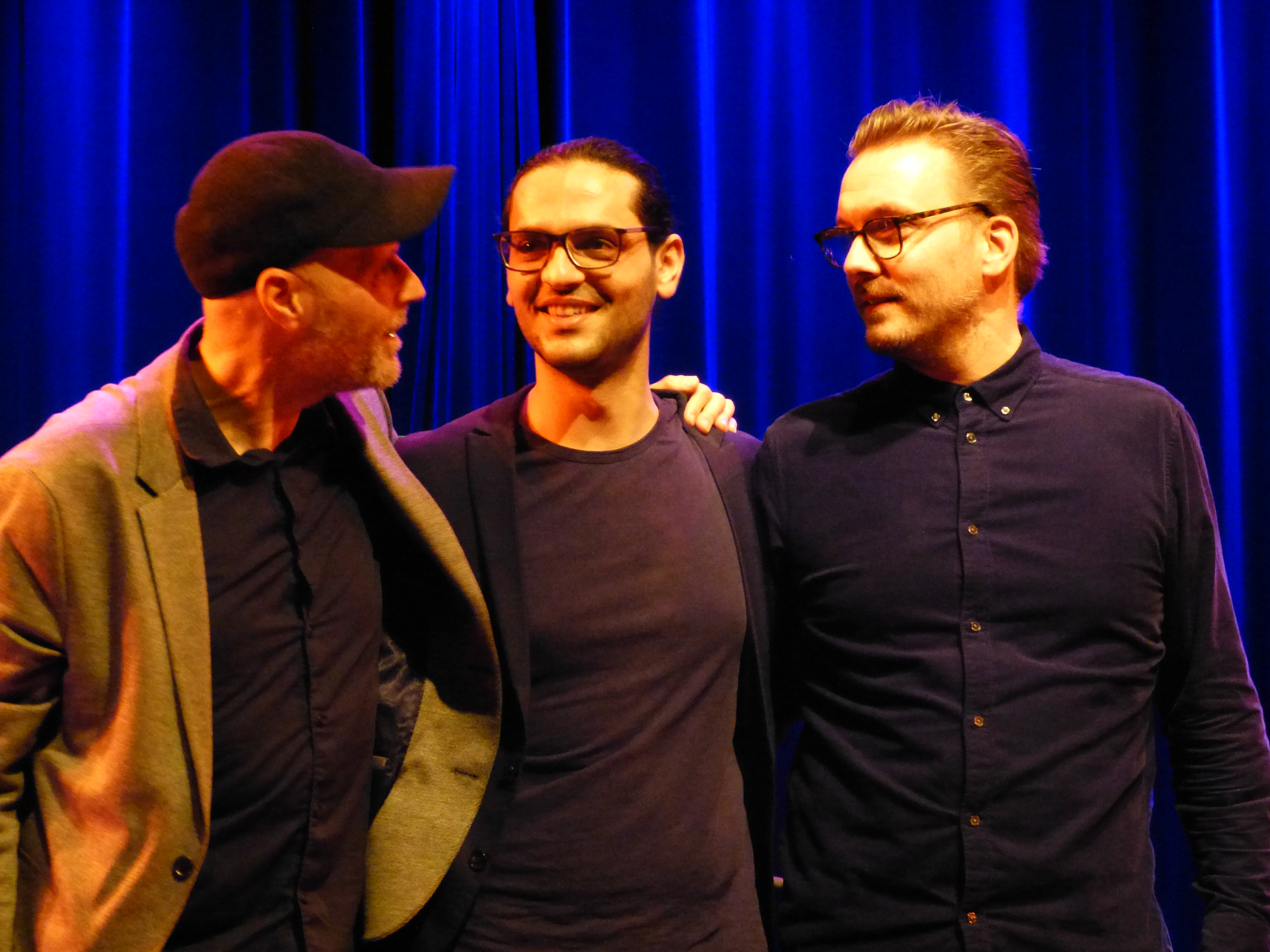
Adamas Circus (Martin Fondse (keys), Modar Salama (perc), Felix Schlarmann (dr)) at Bimhuis 2020

- 2013 Martin Fondse Orchestra & Lenine: 'The Bridge'
- 2012 Martin Fondse Orchestra & Roberto Sion: 'Homelands'
- 2012 Gregory Porter & Metropole Orchestra - arrangements
- 2011 Martin Fondse Orchestra & Matthew Herbert, November Music (NL)
- 2004 Vernon Reid & Metropole Orchestra - Holland Festival (NL), compositions, arrangements
- 2004 Manu Dibango & Metropole Orchestra - Dunya Festival (NL), compositions
- 2003 Pat Metheny & Metropole Orchestra - arrangements
- 1999 Carleen Anderson & Metropole Orchestra - arrangements
