= Raining All Over the World =

Single by The Adventures

from the album Lions and Tigers and Bears
- B-side: "Straight to Heaven"
- Released: 1992
- Length: 4:26
- Label: Polydor
- Songwriter: Pat Gribben
- Producer: Pat Collier

The Adventures singles chronology
"Your Greatest Shade of Blue" (1990)	"Raining All Over the World" (1992)	"Monday, Monday" (1993)

"Raining All Over the World" is a song by Northern Irish band The Adventures, which was released in 1992 by Polydor Records as the lead single from their fourth and final studio album, Lions and Tigers and Bears (1993). The song was written by Pat Gribben and produced by Pat Collier. "Raining All Over the World" reached number 68 in the UK Singles Chart and number 21 in the Music Week Top 50 Airplay Chart.

== Music video ==
The song's original music video was shot by a French director who, according to the band's vocalist Terry Sharpe, had "all these ideas for a concept video which sounded dodgy to begin with". Polydor were unhappy with the results and asked the band re-shoot most of the video. Sharpe explained to the Sunday Sun in 1992, "The video revolved around me standing in the bathroom singing at myself in the mirror with a camera specially angled so you couldn't see it. This French guy was sitting underneath with two little sticks moving the mirror doors on the cabinet. The video had a lot of nice colours in it but didn't break into anything – our marketing people went berserk and told us to re-do most of it again."

== Critical reception ==
On its release, Jim Lawn of The Lennox Herald described the song as "bright and breezy pop with a fabulous hook". In his 2015 book Chart Watch UK - Hits of 1988, James Masterton considered it to be a "memorable single" and "well worth seeking out".

== Track listing ==
- 7-inch and cassette single
1. "Raining All Over the World" – 4:28
2. "Straight to Heaven" – 3:51
- 12-inch promotional single (UK)
1. "Raining All Over the World" – 4:28
2. "Straight to Heaven" – 3:51
3. "Say I'm Sorry" – 4:04
4. "In the Garden" – 4:00
- CD single
1. "Raining All Over the World" – 4:28
2. "Straight to Heaven" – 3:51
3. "Say I'm Sorry" – 4:04
4. "In the Garden" – 4:00

== Personnel ==
The Adventures

- Terry Sharpe – lead vocals
- Pat Gribben – guitar
- Tony Ayre – bass
- Eileen Gribben – vocals

Additional musicians

- Peter-John Vettese – keyboards on "Raining All Over the World"
- Martin Hughes – drums on "Raining All Over the World" and "Say I'm Sorry"

Production

- Pat Collier – producer of "Raining All Over the World", "Straight to Heaven" and "Say I'm Sorry"
- Simon Nixon – engineer on "Raining All Over the World", "Straight to Heaven" and "Say I'm Sorry"
- Stephen Lipson – additional production and remixing on "Raining All Over the World"
- Heff Moraes – additional engineering on "Raining All Over the World"
- The Adventures – producers of "In the Garden"
- John Gould – engineer on "In the Garden"

Other

- Julian Broad – photography

== Charts ==
Chart (1992)	Peak position
UK Singles (OCC)	68
UK Airplay (Music Week)	21
