= Lions, Tigers and Bears (comics) =

Comic book series

- Cover of the first issue (2005 series)

Publication information
- Publisher: Image Comics; Hermes Press
- Genre: Action, supernatural
- Main character: Joey Price

Creative team
- Created by: Mike Bullock
- Artist(s): Jack Lawrence; Paul Gutierrez; Michael Metcalf; Mike Wieringo; Bob Pedroza

Lions, Tigers and Bears is a comic book series from Image Comics and Hermes Press, created by Mike Bullock with artwork by Jack Lawrence, Paul Gutierrez, Michael Metcalf, Mike Wieringo and Bob Pedroza. The phrase "Lions, tigers and bears" is said by the Scarecrow and Tin Man (to which Dorothy Gale replies "Oh my!") in the 1939 film The Wizard of Oz.

The story features the adventures of a young boy named "Joey Price" who discovers that his stuffed animals can come to life to protect him from The Beasties, monsters who come out of his closet to get him in the middle of the night.

== Characters ==
Joey Price is an eight-year-old boy who lives with his single mother. Joey is very daring and adventurous, but like most eight-year-olds, can be easily frightened by the larger world around him. After moving away from the house he grew up in, his grandmother gives him the boxed Night Pride, a set of four stuffed animals, who will later come to life to protect him from the evil Beasties.

Courtney Donlolley is the nine-year-old daughter of Abner Donlolley, maker of the Stuffed Animal Kingdom stuffed animals. As such, she is often the target of Beastie schemes. Courtney and Joey have rapidly become close friends and are often found together.

Ares, the white Bengal tiger is the muscle of the Night Pride. His personality is more dynamic than Pallo's, as he lets his semi-sarcastic sense of humor seep into his dealings. Regardless of his seemingly less serious outlook, Ares is just as duty bound as Pallo and will stand beside Pallo until the very end, no matter the cost. By the end of volume I, Ares is Joey's new best friend.

Venus, the Bengal tigress is second-in-command of the Night Pride. Her strong will and sense of purpose are tempered by her caring heart and empathic nature. Her affection can be seen when she is with another member of the Pride or one of her many friends in the Stuffed Animal Kingdom. Her strength shines through when dealing with the Beasties or other threats to her charges. Every animal in the Kingdom knows of her kind heart and every Beastie fears her name.

Pallo, the lion is the leader of the Night Pride. He is fearless, commanding, decisive and intelligent. His no-nonsense approach to leading the Night Pride has rapidly made him one of the most revered commanders in the Stuffed Animal Militia. His sense of duty is unerring and his dedication to his tasks unyielding.

Minerva, the black leopardess is the stealth agent of the Pride, spending most of her time gliding through the shadows. This makes her something of a loner, but she is still an essential member of the Night Pride. While her strength and ferocity are legendary, so too is her compassion and the only thing more renowned is her sarcasm.

King Bear is the ruler of the Stuffed Animal Kingdom.

== Villains ==
Grumble is the older brother of Mumbler. He gets his name from his temperament, always unhappy, always complaining about this and that. He loves nothing more than to devour small children, but if he is not doing that, his favorite thing to do is complain.

Mumbler is more reserved than Grumble, but has his own sense of mean-ness that he exhibits in his twisted sense of humor. Mumbler derives great pleasure from the discomfort of others, especially Grumble. Mumbler is hard to understand, however, as his giant front teeth muffle his voice terribly, thus making it very hard to figure out what he is saying.

Grok is second in command of the Beasties. His terrible temper suits the needs of his boss, Valthraax. The only thing more ferocious than Grok's anger is his hunger for children.

Valthraax is a humanoid spider dressed in Victorian clothes and the leader of the Beasties whose role is similar to that of the boogeyman, some say, a relative of Abner Donlolley who was cursed to walk the Kingdom as Lord of the Beasties. His only desire is to rid the Kingdom of Stuffed Animals so that he can harvest the children of the real world for his own selfish appetite.

== Publication history ==
The first volume, a four-issue miniseries, was released by Image Comics from February to May 2005, with each issue selling out in weeks to days to hours. The first printing of the collected edition, released by Alias Enterprises, sold out of its initial shipment in a matter of hours as well. The second edition, from Image Comics, sold out in just over a year.

In the summer of 2005, the characters from Lions, Tigers and Bears returned in a 10-part story that ran in the comics section of The Arizona Republic, the state of Arizona's largest newspaper.

Volume II, also a four-issue mini-series, began in April of 2006 and was collected into a trade paperback for release in February 2008.

Volume III was released in late August 2011 by Hermes Press as a full-length graphic novel.

Lions, Tigers and Bears Volume I has been reprinted in Italian, Spanish, Norwegian, French and German.

== Awards ==
Lions, Tigers and Bears is the winner of the 2007 Prix Jeunesse 7-8 ans at the Angoulême International Comics Festival.

The comic is also a winner of the 2005 Paper Screen Gem Award for All Ages, presented by WWW.BROKENFRONTIER.COM.

== Film ==
The comic book series was optioned for film in the fall of 2005 by Union Entertainment for six months, but the company closed their doors before a film could be undertaken.

In 2009, Paramount Pictures optioned the comic series, while Joey Aucoin and Lorenzo di Bonaventura were hired to write and produce, respectively. The project was intended to be a live action, with "heavy doses" of CGI animation. No progress on the project was made and the rights lapsed.
