= Trading Secrets with the Moon =

Studio album by The Adventures
- Released: 23 October 1989
- Recorded: 1989
- Genre: Alternative rock
- Label: Elektra
- Producer: Clive Langer & Alan Winstanley

The Adventures chronology
The Sea of Love (1988)	Trading Secrets with the Moon (1989)	Lions and Tigers and Bears (1993)

Professional ratings
Review scores
Source	Rating
AllMusic	1.5/5 stars
New Musical Express	5/10

Trading Secrets with the Moon is the third studio album by rock band The Adventures, released in 1989. It produced no hit singles. The album itself reached No. 64 on the UK Albums Chart and No. 137 on the Australian Albums Chart.

The album was panned by critics. AllMusic gave it a retrospective rating of 1.5 out of 5 stars.

== Track listing ==
All songs written by Pat Gribben, except where noted:

1. "Your Greatest Shade of Blue" 3:51
2. "Scarlet" 4:57
3. "Washington Deceased" 4:08
4. "Don't Blame It on the Moon" 4:40
5. "Bright New Morning" 4:54
6. "Love's Lost Town" 4:51
7. "Desert Rose" (Pat Gribben, Lloyd Cole) 4:33
8. "Hey Magdalene" 3:30
9. "Sweet Burning Love" 3:41
10. "Never Gonna Change" 4:03
11. "Put Me Together Again" 5:52
