= The Sea of Love =

Studio album by The Adventures
- Released: 9 May 1988
- Genres: Pop rock, new wave
- Label: Elektra
- Producers: Pete Smith, Gary Bell

The Adventures chronology
Theodore and Friends (1985)	The Sea of Love (1988)	Trading Secrets with the Moon (1989)

Professional ratings
Review scores
Source	Rating
AllMusic	4/5 stars

The Sea of Love is the second album by the Northern Irish rock band The Adventures, released in May 1988. Entirely written by band member Pat Gribben, the album was produced by Pete Smith and Garry Bell. The Sea of Love featured the single "Broken Land", their only Top 40 hit in the UK, and also their only chart entry in the United States.

== Overview ==
Released on Elektra Records under a new contract, the album was their most successful, peaking at #30 on the UK Albums Chart and staying on the chart for 10 weeks. It was certified Silver (for 60,000 copies sold) by the BPI in May 1989. The album also reached #144 on the US Billboard 200, their only album to chart there. Singles released from the album were "Broken Land", "Drowning in the Sea of Love" and "One Step from Heaven", charting at 20, 44 and 82 respectively in the UK, while the first two charted within the top 20 in Ireland. "Broken Land" charted at No. 95 on the Billboard Hot 100, their only charting single in the US.

Reviews of the album were favourable with AllMusic retrospectively rating the album four out of five stars, crediting the "optimistic" sound of what is a "feel-good album". Also of mention was lead singer Terry Sharpe's vocals as well as the backing vocals and harmonies, while Pat Gribben is said to be "a gifted guitarist" and "musicianship is top notch". In a contemporary review the Miami News also made mention of the strong harmonies saying that it contained "a symphony of gorgeous voices". It rates highly the opening two tracks, likening the latter to Burt Bacharach and Jimmy Webb, while the band hardens its sound on side two with songs such as "Hold Me Now" and "When Your Heart Was Young". They concluded that "the album vibrates with freshness and unadulterated finesse". Smash Hits magazine commented favourably on the album saying that it was an improvement on their debut. Track "The Trip to Bountiful" was based on the film of the same name.

== Track listing ==
All songs written by Pat Gribben.

Side one

1. "Drowning in the Sea of Love" 4:39
2. "Broken Land" 5:05
3. "You Don't Have to Cry Anymore" 4:09
4. "The Trip to Bountiful (When the Rain Comes Down)" 5:04

Side two

1. "Heaven Knows Which Way" 4:34
2. "Hold Me Now" 4:03
3. "The Sound of Summer" 4:48
4. "When Your Heart Was Young" 3:49
5. "One Step From Heaven" 4:22

Bonus tracks on 2017 reissue:

1. "Broken Land" (Acoustic Version) 5:19
2. "Don't Stand on Me" (B-Side) 4:45
3. "Stay Away" (B-Side) 4:37
4. "The Curragh of Kildare" (B-Side) (Traditional) 2:50
5. "Drowning in the Sea of Love" (Single Version) 4:26
6. "One Step from Heaven" (Extended Remix) 5:05
7. "Instant Karma!" (John Lennon) 3:08
8. "Broken Land" (Single Version) 4:07

== Personnel ==
- Terry Sharpe - Lead vocals
- Pat Gribben - Guitar, piano, steel guitar, vocals
- Tony Ayre - Bass
- Gerard "Spud" Murphy - Percussion, vocals
- Paul Crowder - Drums, vocals
- Eileen Gribben - Vocals
- Andy Findon - Tin whistle
- Paul Fishman - Keyboards, keyboard programming and orchestration
- Nick Glennie-Smith - Keyboards, piano, synthesizer
- Roland Vaughan Kerridge - Electronic percussion
- Richard Niles - String arrangements
- Andrew Pask - Bass
- Peter-John Vettese - Keyboards
- Bob White - Uilleann pipes
- John Whitehead - Keyboards
- David Field - Backing vocals
- Brian Kennedy - Backing vocals
- Katie Kissoon - Backing vocals
- Stevie Lange - Backing vocals
- McCarthy Sisters - Backing vocals
- Peter Smith - Backing vocals
- Miriam Stockley - Backing vocals
- Billy Vanderpuye - Backing vocals
- Rafe McKenna - Engineer
- Dietmar Schillinger - Engineer
- Jim Scott - Mixing engineer
- Simon Fuller - Management
- Tony Mascolo - Photography
- Keith Breeden - Paintings

== Charts ==
Chart (1988)	Peak position
UK Albums Chart	30
US Billboard Top 200	144
