= Paul Crowder =

English musician

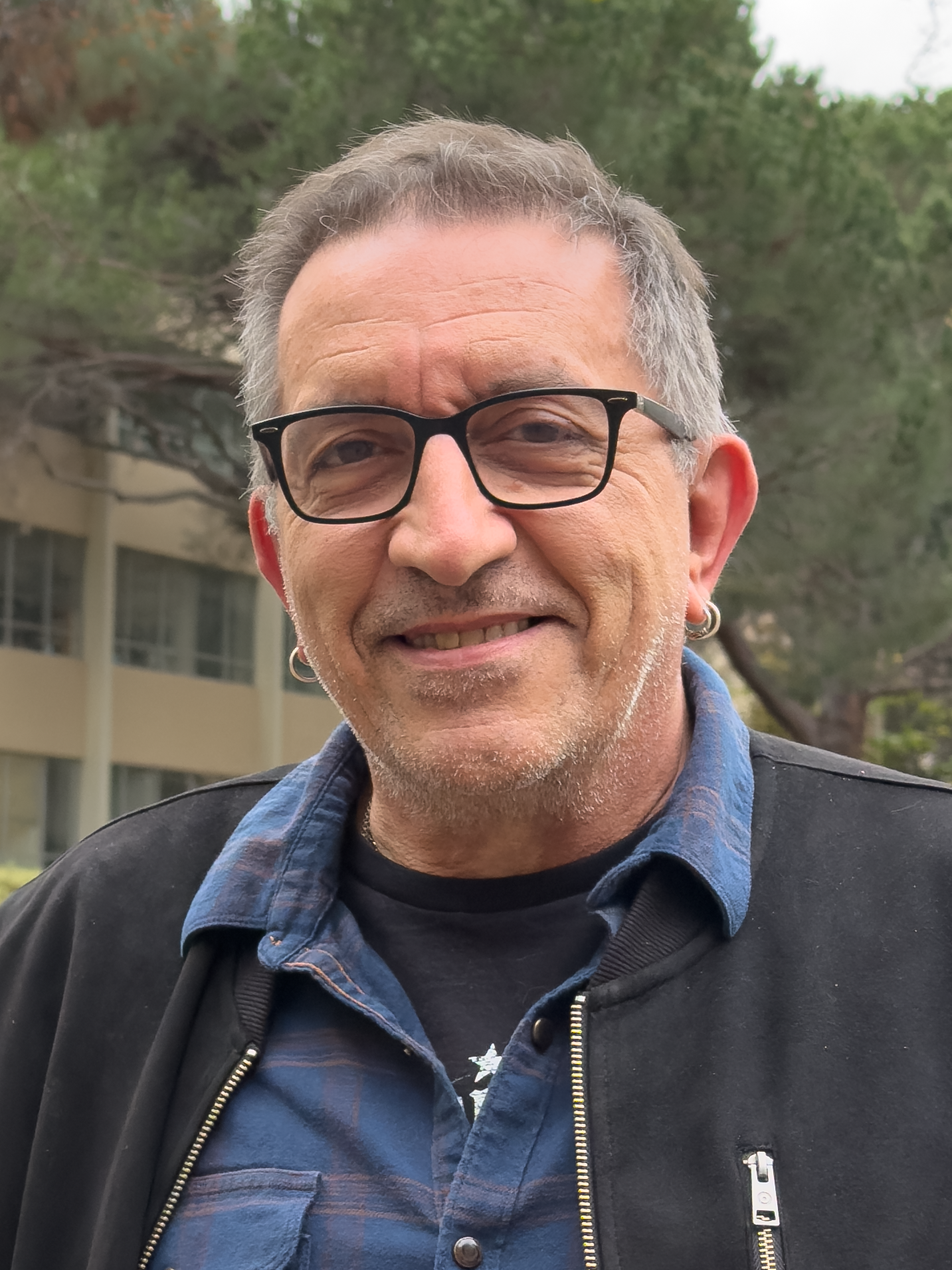
Crowder in 2025

Paul Crowder (born 30 December 1962, London, England) is an English musician, who later became a film editor and director.

== Life and career ==
Crowder's career started as a musician and, in 1980, he joined with Philip Jap as his drummer. Jap was signed to A&M Records in 1981, and he recorded one album, and his 1982 single releases, "Save Us" and "Total Erasure", reached numbers 53 and 41 respectively in the UK Singles Chart.

In 1983, Crowder then became an assistant recording engineer at Advision Studios. He was involved in the recording of such tracks as "Careless Whisper" by George Michael, and "Last Christmas" by Wham! He also recorded the Siouxsie and the Banshees live album, Nocturne, on their mobile recording unit. In 1985, Crowder joined the band the Adventures, achieving a Top 30 album and a Top 20 single in the United Kingdom. In 1989, Crowder moved to Los Angeles and started playing with Eric Burdon, formerly of the Animals, and Robby Krieger, formerly of the Doors, later joined by Brian Auger on keyboards. By 1993, he started playing with Dave King, and was a founder member of the first version of Flogging Molly. In 1996, Crowder undertook a change of career and moved into television as an assistant editor, and by 1997 was editing prime time television. He also acted in an episode of the US sitcom, Ellen in 1996. Crowder also had a small part in the film The Big Empty.

During his time in television he met Stacy Peralta. Crowder went on to edit Dogtown and Z-Boys and Riding Giants with the film's director Stacy Peralta. Dogtown and Z-Boys, produced by Agi Orsi and Stacy Peralta, won the audience award and best director award at the Sundance Film Festival in 2001, and the Independent Spirit Award for Best Documentary in 2002. Crowder also garnered the A.C.E. Eddie for best edited documentary in 2004 for Riding Giants.

Crowder co-directed and edited Once in a Lifetime: The Extraordinary Story of the New York Cosmos, produced by Agi Orsi in 2006, and in 2007 co-directed and edited the Who documentary film, Amazing Journey: The Story of The Who, which was nominated for a Grammy Award at the 2009 Grammys.

In 2006, Crowder teamed up with now long time creative partner, Mark Monroe and producer Morgan Sackett, to form Diamond Docs production company. It has currently 35 films under its belt, including the Academy Award winning The Cove.

In 2008, he edited and co-produced Morning Light for Walt Disney Pictures.

Crowder then directed The Last Play at Shea, a documentary about Shea Stadium, the New York Mets and Billy Joel, told through the last concert played at the park in 2008. It was released in 2010.

In 2012, Crowder edited Sound City: Real to Reel.

In 2013, Paul Crowder was the director for Formula One documentary called 1. 1 is about Grand Prix racings golden era.

Crowder is represented for directing commercials at Nonfiction Unlimited.

Crowder was nominated for the American Cinema Editors Eddie & PrimeTime Emmy for editing the Grammy winning, Ron Howard directed 2016 documentary The Beatles: Eight Days a Week.

In 2016, Crowder joined American Cinema Editors.

The Blue Angels is a documentary film that Crowder directed. It was released on Memorial Day weekend 2024 on Amazon Prime. It was also released in IMAX theaters on 23 May 2024, for a one-week run.
