= Paul Gutierrez =

Paul Gutierrez is the Las Vegas Raiders Insider for Comcast SportsNet in San Francisco. He joined the network in 2010 and covers the Raiders for CSNBayArea.com and CSNCalifornia.com. Additionally, Gutierrez contributes to SportsNet Central, Chronicle Live, Raiders Postgame Live, Raiders Press Conference Live, as well as other NFL related programming.

== Careers ==
Gutierrez spent five years with the Sacramento Bee (2005-2010) as a senior writer, where he covered the Oakland A’s and the San Francisco Giants. He also voted on the Associated Press Postseason Awards panel. He has been a member of the Baseball Writers' Association of America since 2000, where he was chair of the Bay Area chapter and voting member of the Hall of Fame. Gutierrez also worked for the Los Angeles Times (1999-2005), the Las Vegas Review-Journal (1998-1999), and Sports Illustrated (1995-1998).

== Education ==
He received his B.A. in Communications from the University of Nevada, Las Vegas.

== Personal life ==
Gutierrez was born in Barstow, California. He currently lives in Petaluma, California with his wife, Amy Gutierrez, who is a Comcast SportsNet San Francisco reporter, and their two children.
