= Douyé =

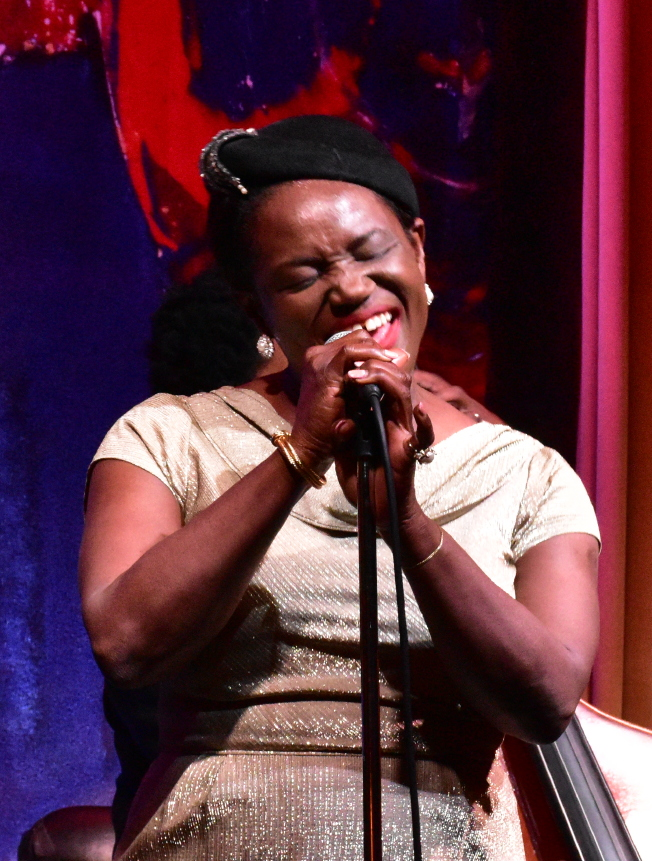
- Performance by Douyé at Vibrato Jazz Grill, 27 February 2018

Background information
- Born: Douyé Doubara Bella Youduba; 4 January 1969 (age 57); Lagos, Nigeria
- Education: California State University (BASW); California State University (MSW); University of Southern California (MA); California Southern University(PsyD)
- Genres: Jazz; R&B; Soul
- Occupations: Singer; songwriter; producer
- Instrument: Vocals
- Years active: 1983–present
- Labels: Rhombus Records, Betsy Blue Music/Groove Note
- Website: douyemusic.com

Douyé (pronounced Doe-Yay, born 4 January 1969) is a Lagos, Nigerian born jazz vocalist who now lives in Los Angeles, California. She has released six albums; the first two recordings were R&B, but she made the change to jazz for her third album to honour her dying father's request to her when she was a child, which was to sing jazz.

== Early life ==
Douyé was born on 4 January 1969 at Lagos Island Maternity Hospital in Lagos, Nigeria. Her father was Landy Youduba and her mother was Diepreye (née Isenah) Youduba.

As a child growing up in Lagos, Douyé was interested in the American music of Billie Holiday, Sarah Vaughn, Ray Charles, Ella Fitzgerald, and Frank Sinatra. She started writing poems, and eventually songs that she started singing at the age of five. Encouraged by her father, Douyé joined a local church choir. Douyé attended Lagos’ Methodist Primary School and graduated from Government College, a secondary school, in 1988.

After her stay in London, she moved to Los Angeles to attend the Musicians Institute in Hollywood as a vocal major and there she became interested in recording R&B music. She studied social work and earned her bachelor's degree from California State University, Los Angeles in 1999. In 2001, she earned her master's degree from California State University, Long Beach in social work. In 2023, she earned her doctoral degree in clinical psychology from California Southern University. In 2026, Douyé received a Master of Arts in Gerontology from the University of Southern California.

== Career ==
=== Early career ===
After attending the Musicians Institute in Hollywood, Douyé trained and had private lessons for many years with Howlett Smith, a jazz pianist, Composer, educator, and vocal coach until his passing in 2019.

At the Musicians Institute, Douyé met songwriter Terry Shaddick, who wrote Olivia Newton-John’s multi-platinum hit, "Physical." Shaddick and Douyé collaborated on songs that became her debut album, Journey, in 2007.

So Much Love was her second R&B album, and featured elements of jazz and reggae. All of the songs were co-written, once again, by Douyé and Shaddick, with fellow Nigerian Dapo Torimiro contributing on a number of cuts. Guitarist/producer Chris Sholar and jazz keyboardist/producer Philippe Saisse also made appearances on the album. The lead track was dedicated to Nigeria’s well-known musician, Fela Anikulapo Kuti. So Much Love was mixed by Ray Bardani and mastered by Bernie Grundman. A song from that album, "Life Is Good," produced by Torimiro, climbed to No. 9 on the UK soul chart.

=== Daddy Said So and Quatro ===
After the two R&B albums, Douyé released Daddy Said So, a jazz album. Her father had insisted she try the genre in her career, a request he made to her when she was 11 and he was on his death bed. As a result, she began performing in jazz jams at the World Stage in Los Angeles, before recording the album.

"Douyé's first jazz record is substantial," reviewed All About Jazz. The album remained on the JazzWeek Airplay chart for 26 weeks.

On 5 April 2019, Douyé released Quatro (Bossa Nova Deluxe) an album of Brazilian and African jazz interpretations of '50s and '60s bossa nova and samba music. The styling expansion was the result of a visit Douyé took to Bahia, Brazil, where she was influenced by the African people and customs of the Brazilian people of Bahia. Quatro was voted as one of the best New Releases in the JazzTimes 2019 Reader's Poll. The album placed at number 18 on The Roots Music Report's Top Jazz Album Chart for the year 2019.

=== 2023 to present ===
Douyé released her fifth studio album, The Golden Sèkèrè, in July 2023. George Harris of Jazz Weekly Magazine said, "Douye’ does an excellent job bridging the gap between jazz and African sounds on this album of standards, presented through the lens of Africa’s horn."

In 2026 Douyé released, Stay with Me. Thierry De Clemensat wrote, "The album finds her moving beyond the role of faithful interpreter and embracing a more personal artistic voice. The technical excellence remains, but it is now accompanied by a deeper sense of freedom, confidence, and individuality."

== Discography ==
- Journey (2008)
- So Much Love (2014)
- Daddy Said So (2017)
- Quatro (Bossa Nova Deluxe) (2019)
- The Golden Sèkèrè (2023)
- Stay With Me - featuring George Cables (2026)
