= Olivier Schwartz =

French pharmacist

Olivier Schwartz is a French pharmacist who, since 2018, has served as scientific director of the Institut Pasteur.

Schwartz received his Ph.D. in virology from Paris 7 University and later joined the Institut Pasteur's Virus and Immunity Unit, where he studied HIV and the Zika virus, prior to his 2018 appointment as the institute's scientific director. He has also served on the scientific advisory board of the Chinese Academy of Sciences and on the external advisory board of the University of Cardiff's Systems Immunity Research Institute.
