= Captain Action =

Action figure

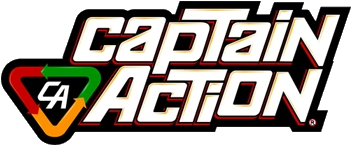
- Created by: Stan Weston
- Original work: Action figure
- Owners: Ideal (1966–97); Mattel (1997–98); Playing Mantis (1998–2005); Captain Action Enterprises, LLC (2005–present)
- Years: 1966–present

Print publications
- Comics: Captain Action #1–5, (DC, 1968–69); Captain Action #0–5 (Moonstone, 2008–09)
- Card games: Captain Action (1966); Captain Action (2016)
- Action figures: 1966–68, 2023

Official website
- captainaction.com

Captain Action is a media franchise born from an action figure line created in 1966. The figures were equipped with a wardrobe of costumes and facial masks allowing him to become Superman, Batman, Spider-Man, Captain America, Aquaman, the Phantom, The Lone Ranger (and Tonto), Flash Gordon, Buck Rogers, Sgt. Fury, Steve Canyon, and the Green Hornet.

Captain Action was the Ideal Toy Company's answer to Hasbro's G.I. Joe, although the protagonist dolls of both toy lines were created and designed by the same toy-and-idea man, Stan Weston. Captain Action also had a working 4 foot (1.2192 meter) parachute.

The figure line then extended to other products such as comic books and card games. A new 1/6-scale action figure line was released in 2023 by Captain Action Enterprises, LLC, the franchise's holder since 2005.

== History ==
Toy developer Stan Weston went to Hasbro's Don Levine with the idea of an articulated doll in the form of a soldier — a basic figure, and with limitless accessories. Levine and his Hasbro team took the concept, making it into G.I. Joe, the first modern action figure for boys — and the first to carry the action figure generic name, an attempt to remove the term "doll" from a toy for boys. Weston took his money from the G.I. Joe venture and founded his own licensing company, representing DC Comics, Marvel Comics, and King Features Syndicate.

After the success of G.I. Joe, Stan Weston's company, Leisure Concepts, then brought the idea of a new, articulated, twelve-inch (305 mm) action figure to Ideal Toys Corporation, who were seeking an action figure of their own, to remain competitive in the toy market. Weston proposed Captain Magic, a many-in-one hero, who could adopt the guise of several heroes, all of whom Leisure Concepts represented. The name was changed to Captain Action, and first marketed by Ideal in 1966.

The figure itself had a rather sad and worried expression, a strange shaped head (so the masks of the various heroes would better stay in place over it) and a more detailed musculature than G.I. Joe's. The original Ideal base for the line was Captain Action in his blue and black uniform, with lightning sword and ray gun included in the box. Separate Superman, Batman, Lone Ranger, The Phantom, Flash Gordon, Captain America, Sgt Fury, Steve Canyon and Aquaman costumes (with accessories) were available; the next wave (1967) added Spider-Man, Buck Rogers, the Green Hornet, and Tonto, with a Blue Lone Ranger variation (matching the still popular Clayton Moore series) and collectible flicker rings in each box. Sgt. Fury was dropped from the line in the second wave.

In 1967, Captain Action proved popular enough to expand the line by adding a partner and an enemy. Action Boy had a similar costume to Captain Action that was red, blue and black. Separate uniform sets available for Action Boy were Robin, Superboy and Aqualad. Dr. Evil, a blue skinned alien with large bug eyes and an exposed brain, wearing a modified Nehru suit and sandals. Ideal did not create any villain costumes for Dr. Evil.

A vehicle called the "Silver Streak", a 2-foot-long (0.61 m) amphibian car with missile launchers, was added, large enough for both the Captain and sidekick. Several sets meant to be used by Captain Action in his Captain Action identity were designed for the character as well: a four foot working parachute, a jet mortar, a jet pack, a weapons arsenal, and several other secret weapons to add to the Action Cave, which the special box for the Streak could convert into. Both the Captain and Dr. Evil received "secret lairs", which doubled as carrying cases for the figures, but which are now quite rare. All of this was an attempt by Ideal to build the "Action" line and focus on Captain Action as a hero in his own right, rather than just a base figure for other heroes.

A line of female figures was also released called the "Super Queens Posin' Dolls", which featured Batgirl, Mera, Supergirl, and Wonder Woman figures. Unlike Captain Action and Action Boy, the Super Queens dolls were each individually based on a singular superheroine (instead of a base "Super Queen" doll with interchangeable outfits).

After just a couple of years, the Captain Action line declined in sales. As a result, Ideal Toys discontinued it in 1968. Though Captain Action was produced for only two and a half years, the characters and accessories have become amongst the most fondly remembered, and expensive to obtain on the collector's market, action figures of the era.

Throughout the 1970s, Captain Action leftover uniforms and boots were used on knock-off, blow-molded figures from China (where the original was cast and assembled) and Ideal itself reused the original body molds to rush a Star Wars-like toy to the market, the Knight of Darkness, in 1977. Captain Action collectors would buy the figure (cast in black plastic) often using the hands to replace the sometimes missing hands of the vintage figures.

=== Captain Action returns ===
After 30 years off the market, Captain Action was revived in 1998, by retro toy company Playing Mantis. In addition to Captain Action and Dr. Evil, costumes released boxed with Captain Action figure were The Lone Ranger (in red and black outfit), Tonto, Flash Gordon, his never-before-made nemesis Ming the Merciless (with a new flesh-tone Dr. Evil figure), The Green Hornet, and his never-before-made sidekick Kato. The line met with lackluster sales, and carded costumes-only were issued separately: Green Hornet, Kato, Lone Ranger (in blue outfit), Tonto, The Phantom, and his never-before-made enemy Kabai Singh. Also revived was Action Boy (now called Kid Action, due to Hasbro owning the rights to the name Action Man) and retro long box packaging for Captain Action and Dr. Evil. The changes made little difference in the general sales and the second coming of Captain Action ended in 2000.

=== 2000s–2010s ===
Since 2005, Captain Action Enterprises holds the licensing rights and has been producing an array of new merchandise, including statues, toys, comics, trading cards, collectibles and apparel.

In March 2011, Round 2 Corp. and Captain Action Enterprises announced plans for a redesigned 1/6 scale Captain Action figure.

== In other media ==
=== Comic books ===
==== DC Comics ====
National Periodical (DC Comics) licensed the character from Ideal and published five issues of Captain Action in 1968, illustrated at first by Wally Wood, then by Gil Kane. The scripts were by a teenage Jim Shooter and Gil Kane. A 2006 interview with Shooter reveals the unpromising setup of the comic:

[Editor Mort Weisinger] called and asked if I'd like to create a new character. I said yes — then he said, "Okay, his name is Captain Action(?!). He has an Actionmobile, a kid sidekick named Action Boy(??!!), a pet Action Panther and a secret Action Headquarters(???!!!) and, by the way, he's also a G.I. Joe-sized action figure". He went on: "Superman must make an appearance in the first issue, because the cover was going to feature Captain Action pushing Superman aside to take on whatever menace I concocted". Sigh. Okay.

The comic book storyline had little to do with the toy concept, as some of the heroes licensed for use as costumes for the Captain Action doll were not owned and published by DC (Spider-Man and Captain America for example, were Marvel Comics characters), therefore the ability to change into different characters was entirely dropped. Instead, Captain Action came to possess magical coins, each of which provided him with a spectacular power from a Greek, Roman, or Norse mythological god (in a similar way to the original Captain Marvel). Captain Action was given a real name of his own, Clive Arno, and was identified as a widowed archaeologist and museum curator, and was described as having located "the coins of power" in a buried city. Action Boy's comic-book alter-ego was Carl Arno, son of Clive. Dr. Evil was given a back-story too, having been Captain Action's father-in-law, then going mad in a mishap. The series lasted five issues, until July 1969.

In the early 1980s, writer Mike Tiefenbacher wrote a story proposal that would have revived Captain Action and Action Boy as "Captain Triumph" and "Javelin" in the "Whatever Happened To...?" backup feature in DC Comics Presents. DC Comics rejected the idea due to copyright concerns regarding the characters. Issue #5 of the Captain Action comic book series, retitled 'Thrills and Adventure', was used as a prop in the "It's the Arts" episode of Monty Python's Flying Circus.

==== Moonstone Books ====
In 2008 Moonstone Books began a new series and created a new backstory for the character. Captain Action was now Miles Drake, a former Marine who discovers a cache of alien weaponry during the Vietnam War. The weapons are connected to a race of alien parasites called the Red Crawl, who have been taking over world leaders in a bid to dominate the earth. The Red Crawl's main representative on earth is Dr. Eville (based on Dr. Evil from the Ideal toy line). Drake becomes an agent of the A.C.T.I.O.N. Directorate, a secret agency operating outside the government and dedicated to defending earth from the alien menace. The name of the organization is an acronym for "Advanced Command for Telluric Interdiction Observation and Nullification". Eventually, the A.C.T.I.O.N. directorate is able to use the alien technology to create superheroes and the Red Crawl is apparently defeated. The series also tell the story of a second Captain Action, Miles's rebellious son, Cole Drake, who inherits the heroic identity in the 21st century. It is revealed that the Red Crawl was never actually defeated and that the superheroic Protectors are actually under their control. Cole must struggle against the renewed alien menace and the rogue superheroes. The stories of the original Captain Action are told in the 1960s where the character is a costumed super spy. The identity-changing aspect of the toy line shows up in Captain Action's ability to use a material called "plastiderm" to disguise himself as almost anyone. In the modern stories the younger Captain Action uses the more advanced "plasmaderm" which allows him not only to assume someone's likeness, but any powers they possess. Thus Captain Action is finally able to change into other superheroes, though this only works for original characters like Savior rather than for licensed characters like Superman. The exception to this has been a crossover adventure with the Phantom whose adventures Moonstone was also publishing.

Moonstone has featured a similarly revised Action Boy. In this version he is Sean Barrett, the son of a famous naturalist whose identity is assumed by Dr. Eville. His stories also take place in the 1960s. Moonstone has also created an original character, Lady Action, who works for the British branch of the A.C.T.I.O.N. Directorate. Both Action Boy and the newly introduced Lady Action (AKA Nicola Sinclair), have been featured as back up stories in the Captain Action comic. Lady Action also debuted in a one shot comic of her own in 2010, and continues to play a pivotal role in the Captain Action ongoing Series.

Moonstone Books published a new Captain Action comic book from 2008 to 2010, with the initial six-issue arc written by Fabian Nicieza. A Captain Action Special was also released in 2010 as well as a two-issue miniseries teaming up Captain Action with the Phantom, written by Mike Bullock. In July 2010, Captain Action Season 2, an ongoing series written by Steven Grant, debuted that lasted 3 issues. Moonstone planned on releasing Captain Action: Classified, which would tell stories of Captain Action's earliest adventures in the 1960s, but this did not happen.

Instead, in 2013 Dynamite Entertainment put out a mini-series with Captain Action called Codename: Action that included several pulp and comic book characters in an origin story for Captain Action.

=== Games ===
In 2016 Small Monsters Games developed and released the Captain Action card game. This is an all-ages casual game including art from classic comics artists Jerry Ordway, Kerry Callen, and Paul Gulacy. The game was designed by Meg Stivison.

=== Books and novels ===
In 2010, the coffee table book Captain Action: the Original Super Hero Action Figure, by Michael Eury, was published by TwoMorrows Publishing.

In July 2012, an original Captain Action pulp novel was released by Airship 27, called Captain Action: Riddle of the Glowing Men, written by Jim Beard.

A second novel by Jim Beard titled Hearts of the Rising Sun was released in 2014 by Airship 27.

A novel featuring Lady Action — The Sands of Forever — by Ron Fortier was released by Airship 27 in 2015.

A third Captain Action novel titled Cry of the Jungle Lord, written by Jim Beard and Barry Reese, was released by Airship 27 in 2017.

== Bibliography ==
- Eury, M. (2002) Captain Action: the Original Super-Hero Action Figure. Raleigh, NC: TwoMorrows Publishing. ISBN 978-1-893905-17-7
- Michlig, Jon (1998) GI Joe The Complete Story of America's Favorite Man of Action
