= Theodore and Friends =

Studio album by The Adventures
- Released: May 1985
- Recorded: 1984−1985
- Genre: New wave; pop rock
- Label: Chrysalis
- Producer: Garry Bell, Steve Harvey, Bob Sargeant

The Adventures chronology
Theodore and Friends (1985)	The Sea of Love (1988)

Professional ratings
Review scores
Source	Rating
AllMusic	4/5 stars
Record Mirror	3/5 stars

Theodore and Friends is the debut album from the Northern Irish rock band the Adventures, released in 1985.

The album contained four minor UK chart hits; "Another Silent Day" (UK #71), "Feel the Raindrops" (UK #58), "Two Rivers" (UK #96), and "Send My Heart" (UK #62) which was a hit in Germany and also featured on the soundtrack to the horror movie Demoni the same year. The album reached #65 in Germany, but did not chart in the UK. In the US, the album was released under the title The Adventures with a modified track listing and different cover artwork. During promotion for the follow-up album, member Pat Gribben stated that he wasn't fully happy with Theodore and Friends stating that "You could hear the production problems". In 1990 he commented favourably on the track "When the World Turns Upside Down" saying that unlike the other tracks it remained fresh whereas the rest of the album relied too heavily on current production and musical trends.

The album was reissued on compact disc in the UK in July 2009 under the 'Lemon' imprint of Cherry Red Records. The reissue includes the original album with several bonus tracks and expanded sleeve notes by rock music journalist Malcolm Dome.

== Track listing ==
All songs written by Pat Gribben, except where noted:

Side one

1. "Always" 3:59
2. "Feel the Raindrops" (Pat Gribben, Terry Sharpe) 3:47
3. "Send My Heart" 3:46
4. "Two Rivers" 4:29
5. "Don't Tell Me" (Pat Gribben, Terry Sharpe) 4:34

Side two

1. "Another Silent Day" (Pat Gribben, Terry Sharpe) 5:06
2. "When the World Turns Upside Down" (Pat Gribben, Terry Sharpe) 4:50
3. "Love in Chains" 3:41
4. "Lost in Hollywood" 5:10
5. "These Children" 3:21

Extra tracks on 2009 reissue:

1. "Feel the Raindrops" (Extended Remix) (Pat Gribben, Terry Sharpe) 4:56
2. "Happy Depression" (B-side) 3:46
3. "Life During Wartime" (Live) (David Byrne) 3:45
4. "Nowhere Near Me" (B-side) 4:33
5. "Send My Heart" (Extended Remix) 5:02
6. "These Children" (Live) 3:25
7. "Tristesse En Vitesse" (B-Side) (J. Martin) 4:04

=== US track listing ===
Side one

1. "Send My Heart" 3:45
2. "Always" 4:04
3. "Another Silent Day" 4:22
4. "Love in Chains" 3:39
5. "When the World Turns Upside Down" 4:23

Side two

1. "Feel the Raindrops" 3:46
2. "Two Rivers" 4:24
3. "Don't Tell Me" 4:30
4. "Nowhere Near Me" 4:35
5. "Lost in Hollywood" 5:04

== Personnel ==
- Terry Sharpe - vocals
- Eileen Gribben - backing vocals
- Pat Gribben - guitar
- Tony Ayre - bass
- Paul Crowder - drums
- Spud Murphy - percussion, backing vocals
- Jonathan Whitehead - keyboards
- Billy Livesey, Geoff Leach, Nick Glennie-Smith - keyboards (additional)
- Steve Harvey - drum programming (additional), choir
- Charlie Morgan, Paul Turner - drums (additional)
- Tony Maroni - percussion (additional)
- Simon Climie - Fairlight programming
- Heff Moraes, Tony Richards - engineers
- John Gallen, Rafe McKenna, Will Gosling - recording engineers
- Steve Harvey - producer on "Don't Tell Me", "Another Silent Day", "When the World Turns Upside Down", "Love in Chains", "In Hollywood" and "These Children"
- Garry Bell - producer on "Always", "Feel the Raindrops" and "Two Rivers"
- Bob Sargeant - producer on "Send My Heart"
