= Frank Marien =

Australian journalist

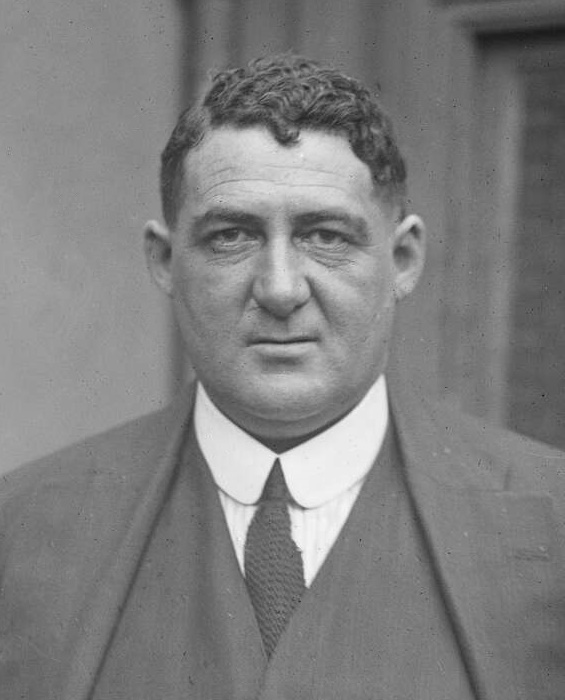
- Frank Marien, photographed in about 1930.
- Born: Francis Joseph Marianni; 1890; Sydney, New South Wales, Australia
- Died: 17 July 1936 (aged 45); Miranda, New South Wales
- Occupations: Journalist, editor
- Writing career
- Period: 1910 – 1936

Francis Joseph Marien (1890 – 17 July 1936), born in Sydney, Australia, of Irish and Italian parents (his father was born "Marianni"), was an editor of Smith's Weekly.

Educated at St Joseph's College, Hunters Hill, he proved to be an all-round achiever, rowing in the winning school eight, and becoming captain of the Rugby Union football, cricket and athletics teams,. He also edited the school magazine, producing all its artwork, and even helped design the school badge.

Dattilo Rubbo was sufficiently impressed with his artistic abilities to recommend he take up painting professionally.

Instead Marien took up journalism, first with the Australian edition of the Freeman's Journal (in 1942 incorporated into the Catholic Weekly), Daily Telegraph from 1919 to 1922 then the (Sydney) Sun. In 1926 he was appointed Managing Director of Truth, where he succeeded in raising its circulation substantially.

In 1928, he was appointed Editor-in-Chief of Smith's Weekly, replacing Claude McKay, building up its stable of black-and-white artists including Syd Miller, Joe Jonsson, Emile Mercier, Virgil Reilly, Rosaleen Norton, Marie 'Mollie' Horseman and Joan Morrison, as well as giving great support to those already on the payroll — George Finey, Frank Dunne, George Donaldson, and Stan Cross, who called him "the best Art Editor Australia ever had".

Marien's second title was "Mechanical Superintendent" – he was a skilful fitter and turner and Linotype compositor, and a movie projectionist, with a well-equipped workshop and an 80-seat cinema at "Pine Lodge", his Miranda home.

In 1932, he made a major error in not "pulling" the Wilkinson story, a lurid litany of untruths about the victim of a callous murder. Described as "wicked beyond expression", the error was quickly seized on by his competitors, particularly the Sydney Sun. Smith's Weekly never fully recovered from the bad publicity and the resultant drop in circulation.

He died at the age of 45, after several years of illness, much of the time confined to a nursing home. He was still editing the paper on the day he died.

== Personal ==
In 1915, he married Marie Therese "Maisie" Fitzpatrick. They had one daughter, Frances, and two sons, William and Brian, both of whom followed their father by rowing in winning "eights" at St Joseph's.
