= Minties =

Mint-flavoured confectionery

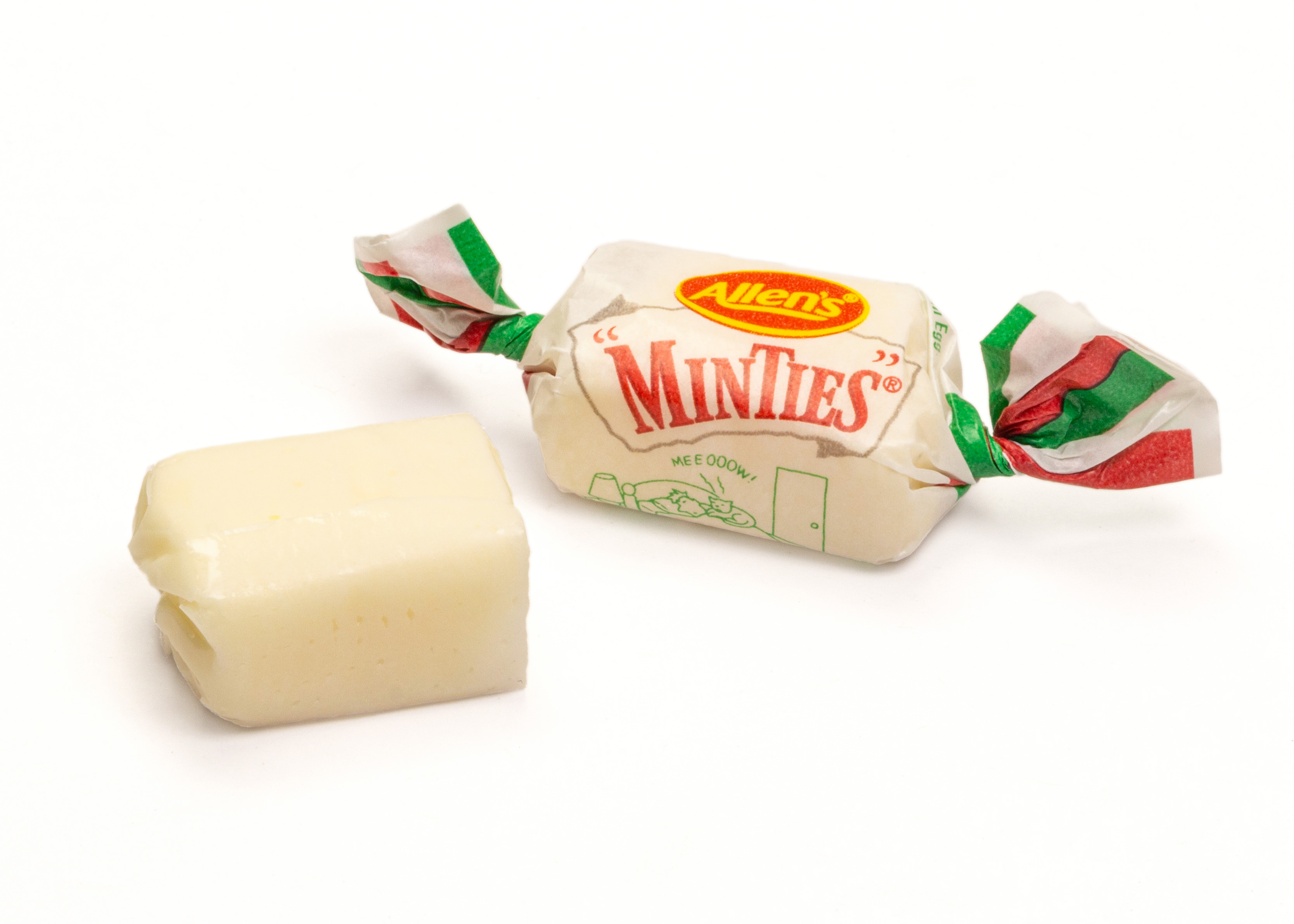
- Type: Confectionery
- Place of origin: Australia (1922; 104 years ago)
- Created by: James Noble Stedman
- Main ingredients: Glucose syrup, cane sugar, gelatine, mint flavour, vegetable oil

Minties is a brand of confectionery originating in Australia and manufactured in both Australia and New Zealand for their respective markets. They are hard white, chewy, rectangular and mint-flavoured, which on chewing become so sticky that they are notorious for causing dental fillings to come out. They were originally packaged in 5lb (around 2.2 kg) bulk tins or 3oz (around 85g) cardboard boxes, but now come in packs ranging from 150g - 1 kg. Minties are wrapped in waxed paper with a cartoon underneath the logo with the common caption "It's moments like these you need Minties".

About 500 million are consumed each year.

In the early 1990s, Chocomints were marketed, which integrated milk chocolate into the traditional recipe. Later in the 1990s, Minties released 'Spearmint Minties', but these were taken off the market for unknown reasons just before the end of 1999. In 2013, Nestlé (Australia) introduced Allen's Minties "Smooth Mints Choc & Vanilla" which had choc-mint and vanilla-mint varieties in one packet.

== History ==
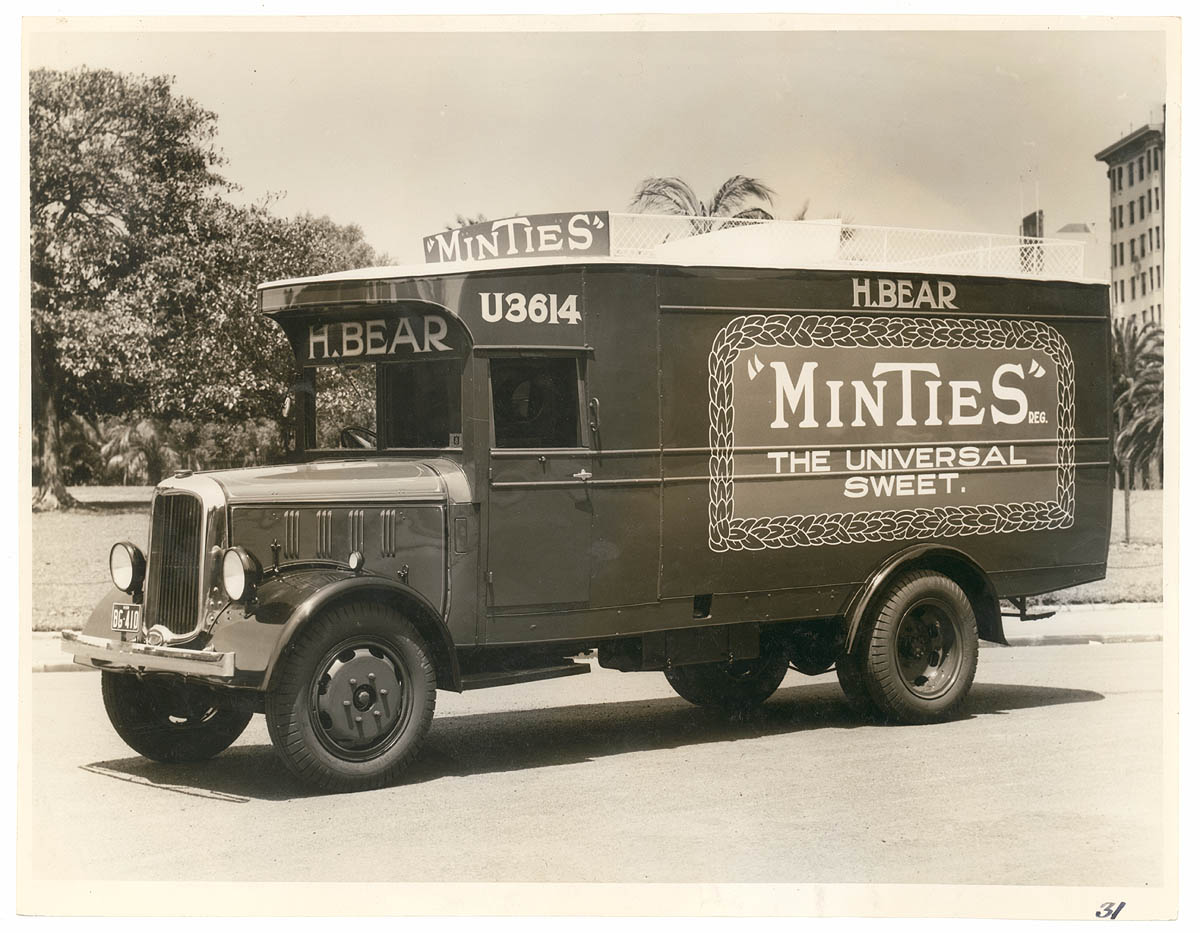
'Minties' confectionery, Dennis truck, H Bear, Sydney, ca. 1930

Minties were invented in 1922 by James Noble Stedman (1860–1944), son of company founder (and Australia's first confectioner) James Stedman (1840–1913). They were patented in 1926, and were manufactured by James Stedman — Henderson Sweets Limited at the "SweetAcres" factory at Rosebery, New South Wales. Other well-known lines made at Sweetacres were "Fantales" and "Talky Toffee".

In 1968, Stedman-Henderson was taken over by Hoadleys, which was itself acquired in 1971 by Rowntree's. Nestlé took over the Rowntree's brand globally in 1981. They are now sold as "Allens Minties" (Nestlé acquired the Allens brand in 1985.)

In 1930 or 1931, a factory was set up in Auckland, New Zealand. Cadbury now manufactures the lollies as "Pascall Minties". In November 2009, Cadbury New Zealand announced they were moving production from Auckland to Thailand and changing to a softer formulation that would be less stressful to teeth and may be consumed more quickly). Curiously, the 200g packets sold in Australia as (Nestlé) Allens Minties in 2010 are clearly labelled "Made in New Zealand".

== Depression, then wartime shortages ==
Newspaper advertising appears to have dropped off considerably, both in quantity and quality, between 1931 and 1940.

During World War II and until 1946, supply of confectionery was restricted; what output there was went to serving troops. Advertising resumed after the cessation of hostilities, anticipating eventual availability. Rationing may have been on a state-by-state basis.

== Place in Australian culture ==
MODERN CATCH WORDS.

Catch phrases start up from unknown sources, and sweep around the world with almost unbelievable rapidity. The origin of many of them is hopelessly lost. Who, for instance, was the first person to say "There you are, then"? A few years ago it was heard on every lip. Some of them, like "Yes, we have no bananas" come from comic songs, and others from newspaper advertisements. One of the most popular of the latter variety is "It's moments like these you need 'Minties'". At the present time, one hears the phrase wherever one goes. The makers of "Minties", Messrs. James Stedman-Henderson's, of "Sweetacres", receive dozens of suggestions by every post from people instancing "Moments like these", when "Minties" would have been most acceptable. "It's moments like these" has proved itself to be one of the most catchy catch phrases that has ever caught on, and it shows no signs yet of fading out of public recognition.

— The (Rockhampton) Morning Bulletin, 19 July 1927.

Minties had been available in shops from 1923 or earlier, but became the subject of prominent advertising as "The Universal Sweet" in June 1926. Coincident with this launch, the SweetAcres company offered a "MINTIES Magic Drawing Book for your Girl or Boy" for the price of return postage (one penny). This publication was a booklet of apparently blank pages whose pictures became evident when lightly rubbed with a soft pencil or crayon, similar to a brass rubbing, and was last offered in September 1932.

Minties' first cartoons, and the catchphrase "It's moments like these ..." appeared late in 1926; from then they provided an episodic documentation of an era.

At one stage in the 1940s, Minties were using three different cartoons a week, appearing on every form of printed advertising: the 3oz (around 85g) boxes in which they were originally sold, newspapers and railway station hoardings.

The cartoons depict mishaps and unfortunate experiences, sometimes featuring recognisable sporting or political figures, but more often general comic situations, captioned "It's moments like these" or "Another Minties moment". The catchphrase "It's moments like these" has become part of the Australian language. The entry for "Mintie" in a major Australian dictionary defines the phrase as "... widely current ... used allusively as an emblem of solace".

At that time, the lolly wrappers (white waxed paper) were decorated only with the text "Minties" and "The Universal Sweet" in red and green. Now, the only artwork is on the wrappers with simple anonymous cartoons of people engaged in recognisable activities accompanied by the caption "It's moments like these ...".

Many cartoonists have drawn "Minties moments". While many of the cartoons were unsigned, some of the better known names are:

- Dick Alderton (Note: Alderton created the "Nursie" panel for The Daily Mirror.)
- George Aria (Note: Aubrey "George" Aria drew for "Picaninnies' Pages" in The Australian Woman's Mirror.)
- James Bancks (creator of "Ginger Meggs")
- Ian Gall (Note: Gall drew "Uncle Joe and His Horse 'Radish'" following the death of Joe Jonsson.)
- Alexander Gurney (created "Bluey and Curley")
- Peter Harrigan "Middy"
- Norman Hetherington "Heth" (created Mr Squiggle)
- Eric Jolliffe
- Hardtmuth Lahm "Hotpoint" "Hotti" or "Hottie" (Note: Lahm created the dog "Snifter" for Man Magazine)
- Percy Lindsay
- F. G. Longstaff
- Jack Lusby
- Stewart McCrae "Pep"
- Arthur Mailey
- Emile Mercier
- Syd Miller (Chesty Bond artist)
- Minainnick
- Norm Mitchell
- Rufus Morris
- Morrissey
- Syd Nicholls (creator of "Fatty Finn")
- Adrienne Parkes
- Petrov
- William Edwin Pidgeon "Wep"
- Hal Quinlan
- Virgil Reilly "Virgil"
- Jim Russell (drew "The Potts")
- Ted Scorfield (largest number of contributions)
- David Souter
- Les Such (Note: Such drew a sci-fi strip "Sting Lasky", and subbed for Len Lawson from 1955.)
- Dorothy Wall
- Harry John Weston (1874–1938)
- Unk White
- Jeremy Andrew (21st-century)

== Sources ==
- Lindesay, Vane It's Moments Like These Sun Books, Melbourne 1979 ISBN 0-7251-0339-6
