= Daily Guardian (Sydney) =

Australian daily newspaper published in Sydney from 1923 to 1931

The Daily Guardian was an Australian daily newspaper published in Sydney from July 1923 to 1931. It was owned by Smith's Newspapers Limited, a holding company controlled by James Joynton Smith and better known as the publisher of Smith's Weekly. It was known for publicity stunts, including offering its subscribers free insurance and sponsoring the first Miss Australia pageant. It ceased publication on 15 February 1931 as a result of the Great Depression.

The paper's editors and employees included Claude McKay, Robert Clyde Packer, Frank Packer, Voltaire Molesworth. and Colin Simpson

The first Sunday Guardian, with an issue date of 29 September, appeared on the evening of Saturday 28 September 1929, in competition with the Sunday Sun and Sunday Telegraph, all largely devoted to sports results. Intense (and expensive to all concerned) competition ensued. It ceased publication with its parent publications, all having been absorbed by Associated Newspapers Ltd.
