= Syd Miller =

Syd Miller may refer to:

- Syd Miller (rugby union)
- Syd Miller (cartoonist)

== See also ==
- Sid Miller (disambiguation)
- Syd Millar, rugby union prop from Northern Ireland
