= Syd Miller (cartoonist) =

Australian cartoonist (1901–1983)

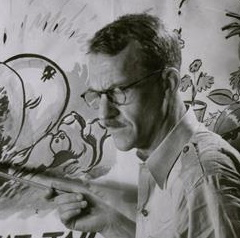
- Syd Miller (photographed in 1942).
- Born: Sydney Leon Miller; 24 December 1901; Strathfield, New South Wales, Australia
- Died: 31 December 1983 (aged 82); Wahroonga, New South Wales, Australia
- Occupations: Cartoonist, illustrator, caricaturist, animator
- Writing career
- Pen name: 'Syd. M.'; 'Noël'
- Period: 1917–1964

Signature
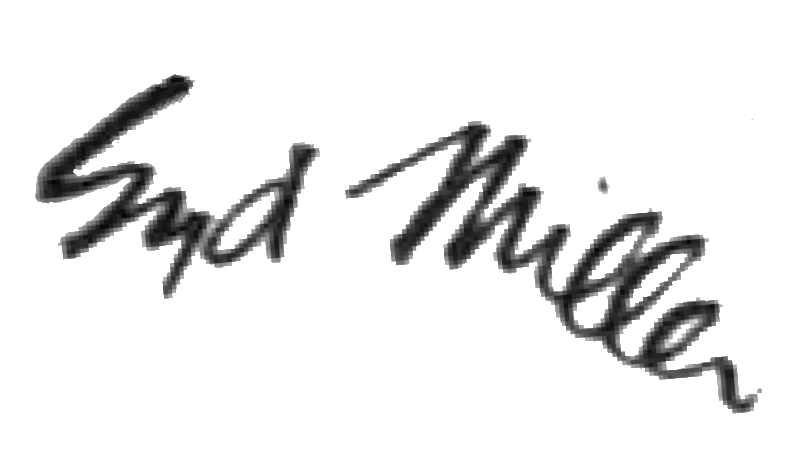

Sydney Leon Miller (24 December 1901 – 31 December 1983) was a prolific Australian artist celebrated for his black-and-white work as a cartoonist, illustrator, caricaturist and comic-book author. Known professionally as Syd Miller, he was employed as a staff-artist for Smith's Weekly from late-1922 until 1935, when he left to pursue a diversity of freelance work. Miller created a number of comic-strips during his career, most notably the iconic 'Chesty Bond' character as a marketing campaign for the Australian clothing company Bonds. He also wrote and illustrated the Rod Craig comic-strip which was serialised from 1946 to 1955 and syndicated across Australia and internationally.

== Biography ==
=== Early life ===
Sydney Leon Miller was born on 24 December 1901 in Strathfield, an inner western suburb of Sydney, the only child of Sydney Miller and Leontine (née Thorp). Sydney's father was a newsagent at Strathfield. In November 1912 Leontine initiated divorce proceedings and the divorce of Syd's parents was finalised in August 1912. Both his parents remarried in 1913, his father to Eleanor Hutchinson and his mother to Alfred Hartnup.

Syd Miller was educated at Fort Street High School where his artistic talent was discouraged.

=== Work ===
Miller left school in 1916, aged fifteen, and worked briefly for Muir & Neil, a pharmaceutical importer, before finding a position as an apprentice in the process-engraving department of The Bulletin. While working at the Bulletin Miller attended night classes at the Royal Art Society of New South Wales.

In 1917 Harry Julius formed the Cartoon Filmads Studio, at that stage a division of Smith and Julius Advertising, for the production of animated cartoons used as advertising in cinemas. Julius hired a group of artists, including Miller, to become his chief animators. The company expanded rapidly, offering to clients a wide range of animated advertisements that would screen in cinemas prior to the main feature.

Miller was one of the artists whose drawings were published in the June 1920 issue of Aussie magazine, by then subtitled The Cheerful Monthly. An article in June 1920 praising of the qualities of the Aussie magazine singled out "the animal pictures of Syd. Miller", a young Sydney artist who the writer predicted "will someday achieve big things in this line".

=== Smith's Weekly and freelance work ===
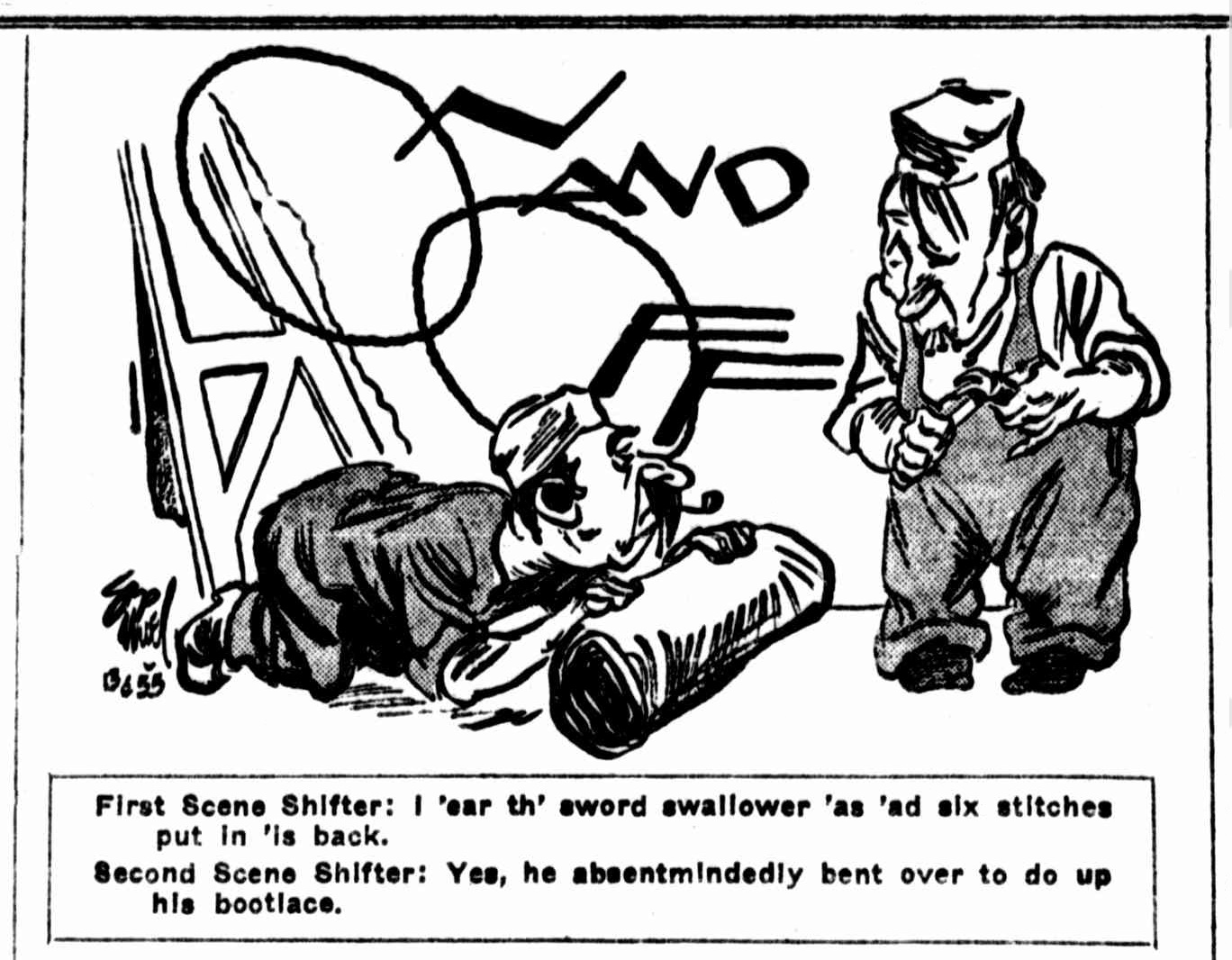
"First Scene Shifter: I 'ear th' sword swallower 'as 'ad six stitches put in 'is back. Second Scene Shifter: Yes, he absentmindedly bent over to do up his bootlace." On and Off banner and incorporated cartoon by Syd Miller, Smith's Weekly, 20 November 1926.

Several of Miller's animal-themed cartoons were published in Smith's Weekly during 1921 (probably freelance contributions).

In the first half of 1922 Miller had five of his comic-strips published in the Sunbeams children's supplement in the Sunday edition of Sydney's The Sun newspaper. Each of the strips featured animal characters, three of which featured 'Billy the Bear' (a koala). His other comic-strips were a dog tale (Dirt-Bin Dan & Polly Peke) and a story of Noah and his animal passengers (Ark-Larks).

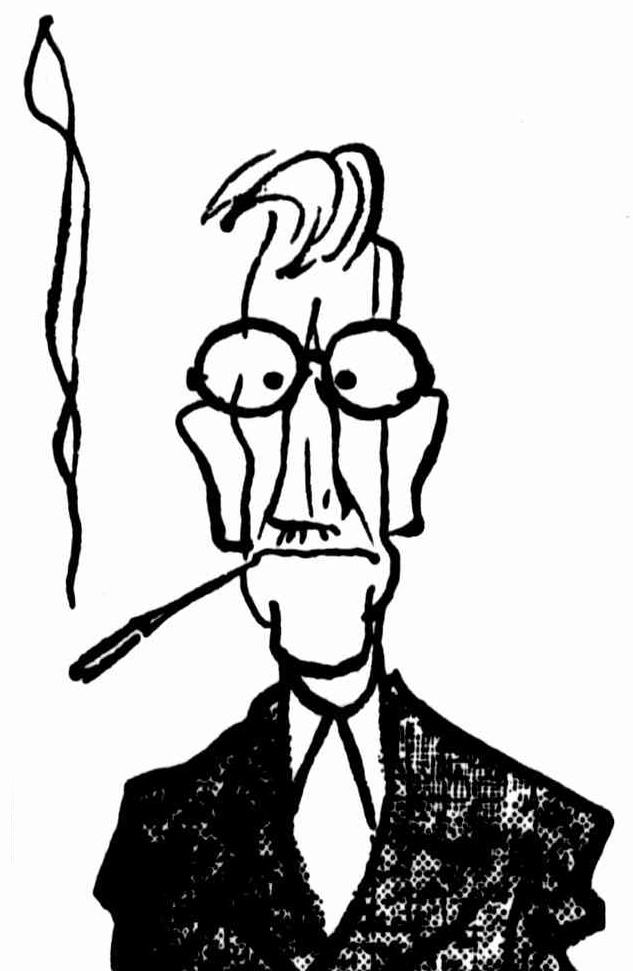
Cartoon image of Syd Miller ("by a fellow-caricaturist"), published in Smith's Weekly, 21 April 1934.

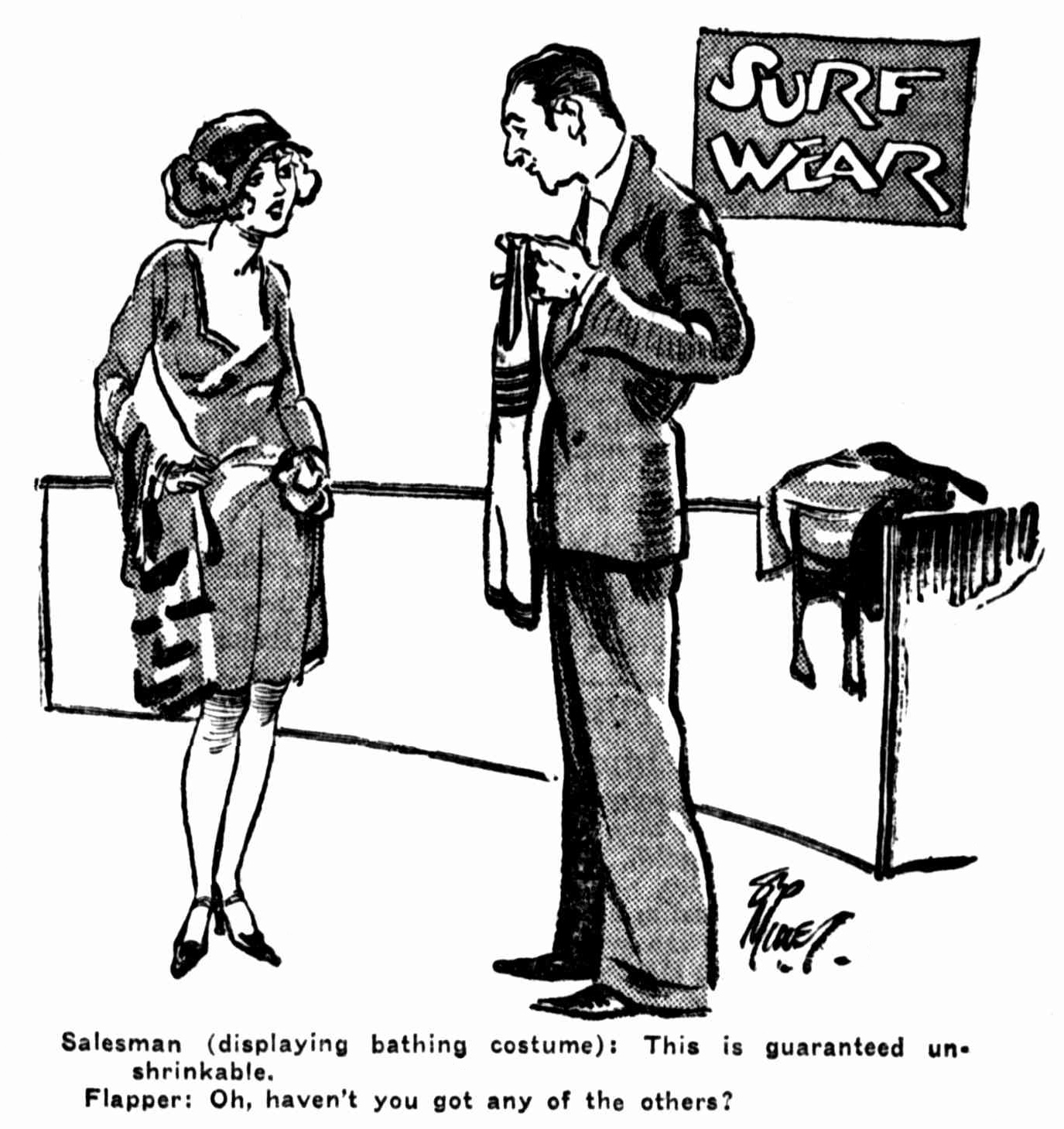
"Salesman (displaying bathing costume): This is guaranteed unshrinkable.
Flapper: Oh, haven't you got any of the others?"
– cartoon by Syd Miller, Smith's Weekly, 28 January 1928.

Miller was employed as a staff-artist by Smith's Weekly, probably from mid- to late-1922. A number of his early cartoons for Smith's had biblical themes. Miller often featured animals in his cartoons, including his 'Squizzy the Pup' comic-strip that appeared semi-regularly from 1922 to 1924 (and occasionally from 1925 to 1928).

When Smith's Weekly artist Alek Sass died on 1 December 1922, Miller took over Sass' role of illustrating stage and screen actors and their theatrical characters in the regular On and Off feature in the newspaper. Miller's first drawing in this vein, published on 9 December 1922, was a drawing of three actors in their roles in Spangles, a musical comedy playing at Fuller's Theatre in Sydney (described as "a mad whirl of humour and melody and shapely limbs in delightful costumes"). Syd Miller remained involved with the On and Off column until it was wound up in late 1929, providing illustrations and also occasionally writing theatrical reviews.

Miller also drew illustrations for the regular columns written by Ethel Kelly (Mrs. T. H. Kelly) during 1923 and early 1924. He also provided small drawings during 1923 for the semi-regular Sadie Said column (replacing Sass in this role after his death).

In April 1923 Syd Miller and Susan Austin were married at St. Leonards on Sydney's lower North Shore region. The couple had two children, Robin born in 1928 and Peter in 1930.

Miller was a founding member of the Australian Society of Black-and-White Artists in July 1924. Miller extended the range of his contributions to Smith's Weekly during the mid- to late-1920s. In addition to his illustrations for the On and Off column and his animal-themed cartoons and comic-strips, Miller's drawings included cartoons, comic-strips and caricatures on a broad range of subjects and themes, including political and social commentary.

As well as traditional pen and ink drawing, in the 1930s Miller began to use a scraperboard for some of his drawings.

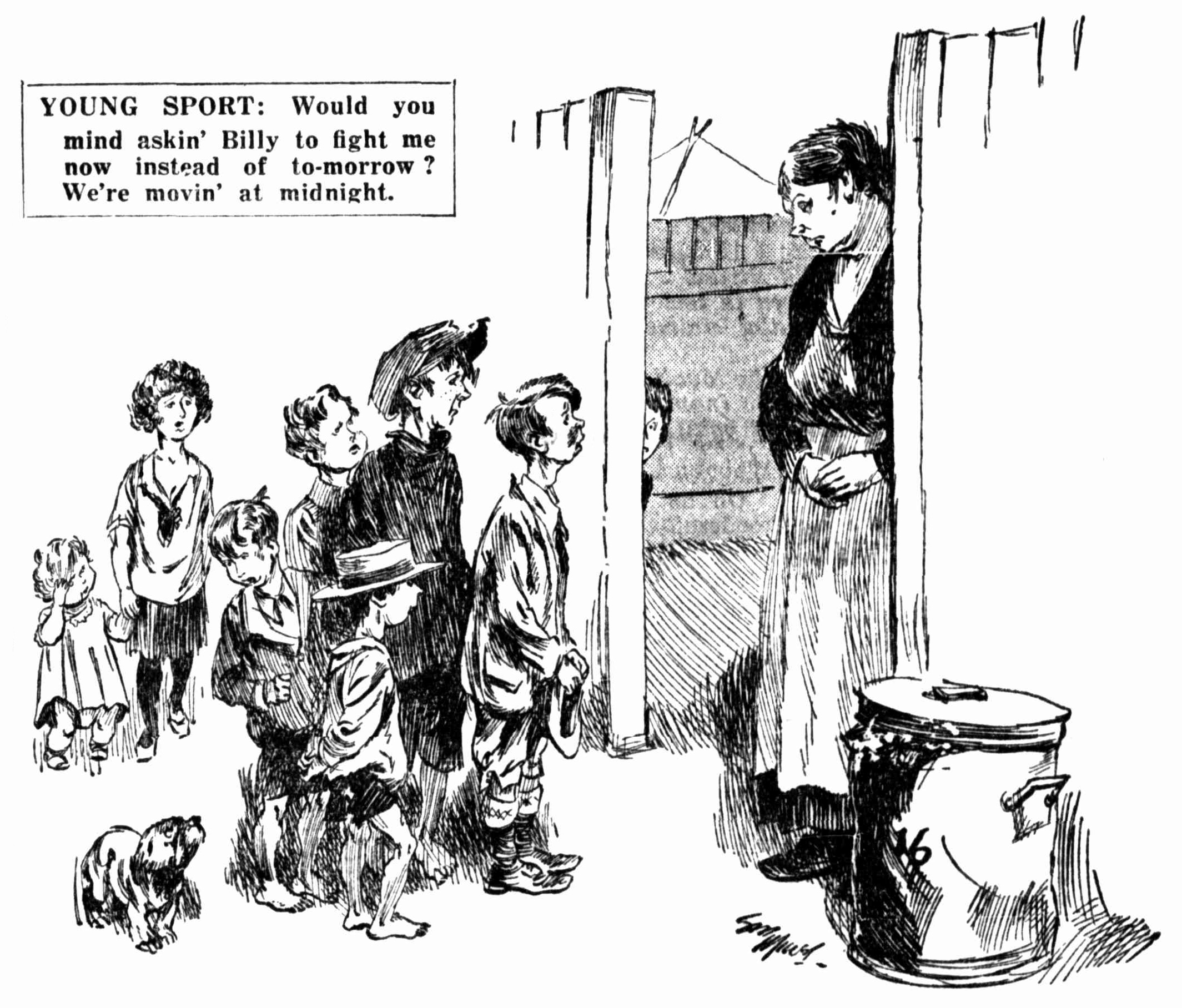
"Young sport: Would you mind askin' Billy to fight me now instead of to-morrow? We're movin' at midnight.", – cartoon by Syd Miller, Smith's Weekly, 11 April 1931.

Miller had the capacity for long hours of work; "endowed with an almost terrifying nervous energy, he could work over ninety hours a week". By about 1933 he began taking on freelance work to offset a salary cut he and the other Smith's Weekly artists had taken during the Depression years. In June and July 1933 Miller's drawings (several using the scraperboard technique) were used to illustrate short fiction stories in the Australian Women's Weekly. A number of his cartoons also appeared in the same publication in the period July to September 1933. However, under the terms of his employment contract with Smith's Weekly, Miller was not permitted to do outside work. Frank Marien, Smith's editor-in-chief, suspected Miller was breaking his contract but was unable to prove it or get Miller to admit to the transgression. One afternoon in the Assembly Hotel, adjacent to the newspaper offices, Miller and Marien "became very pally over a few beers and Syd growing expansive, confessed that he had been doing outside work". As a result of his admission, Marien sacked Miller, but afterwards he regretted his action and "begged Syd to ignore the dismissal, and the artist came back". Miller and Marien came to an agreement whereby Miller's drawings that were published in Smith's were signed with the name 'Noël' (Miller's middle name backwards). The illustrations signed 'Noël' were published during the period September to December 1933. Several more were published in early 1934, but by this time cartoons signed with Miller's usual signature had begun to reappear in Smith's Weekly.

From October 1933 to March 1934 Miller collaborated with the journalist Thomas Dunbabin to produce a regular feature called Curiosities, published in Melbourne's The Herald newspaper. Each edition of Curiosities presented a set of interesting facts, mostly relating to Australia, alongside images relevant to the text drawn by Miller. Curiosities was similar in concept to Ripley's Believe It or Not which had begun to be syndicated in Australian newspapers from November 1932 after Robert Ripley visited Australia earlier that year.

Syd Miller was an outstanding caricaturist and numerous examples of his craft were published in Smith's Weekly. Many of his caricatures were of a single person, but he also illustrated a number of group caricatures. A 1928 drawing was made up of caricatures of the entire English test cricket team, including their manager. A drawing published in April 1932 featured a line-up of the members of cabinet of the Lang government of New South Wales above a view of the chamber of the Legislative Assembly in session, complete with caricatures of every member of parliament. In February 1934 a full-page illustration by Miller was published of caricatures of the Australian test cricketers (including their manager) and the Davis Cup tennis team. In April 1934 an exhibition of Miller's caricatures was opened at the Nock and Kirby's Pompadour Gallery in Sydney.

Miller himself claimed he left the staff of Smith's Weekly in 1935, in order to return to freelance work. His work continued to occasionally appear in Smith's Weekly until the mid-1940s, but they were published on a freelance basis.

During the test match series when the English cricket team toured Australia in the summer of 1936–37, Miller contributed several cricket-themed cartoon compilations to the Sunday edition of The Sun newspaper. A semi-regular cartoon feature called Syd Miller Says and Syd Miller Tells was published in The Sun (Sunday edition) from January 1937 to June 1937. The features were a set of themed cartoons concerning sport-related issues of the day.

=== Chesty Bond ===
In 1937 Miller started drawing comic-strips to advertise singlets manufactured by the Bonds company. His eight-year association with Bonds led directly to the creation of the Chesty Bond comic-strip in 1940.

The first Bonds advertising comic-strip, called Embarrassing Moments from History, commenced in March 1937. The advertising strip appeared in various eastern Australian newspapers, initially made up of comic-strips illustrated by Miller and three other artists, Syd Nicholls, George C. Little and 'Wep' (Walter Pidgeon). The strips consisted of separate vignettes featuring historical, biblical and fictional characters, always somehow involving a "Bonds Athletic vest" (singlet). After the initial strips appeared and had been re-run, new comic-strips in the series began to be published from October 1937, all drawn by Miller. In the creation of the Bonds advertising content, Miller collaborated with Ted Moloney, who worked for the J. Walter Thompson advertising agency. Moloney and Miller had known each other since the 1930s when they both worked for Smith's Weekly newspaper. The Embarrassing Moments from History advertising comic-strip continued to appear in newspapers until the end of 1939, though no new strips were drawn after October 1938. In late 1939 Miller began to illustrate new advertising comic-strips for Bonds called Aussie History. It was a similar concept to the Embarrassing Moments from History content, but with a focus on Australian history. Like its predecessor, the Aussie History advertising comic-strip was published and re-run in various newspapers. It was relatively short-lived, appearing only from August to December 1939.

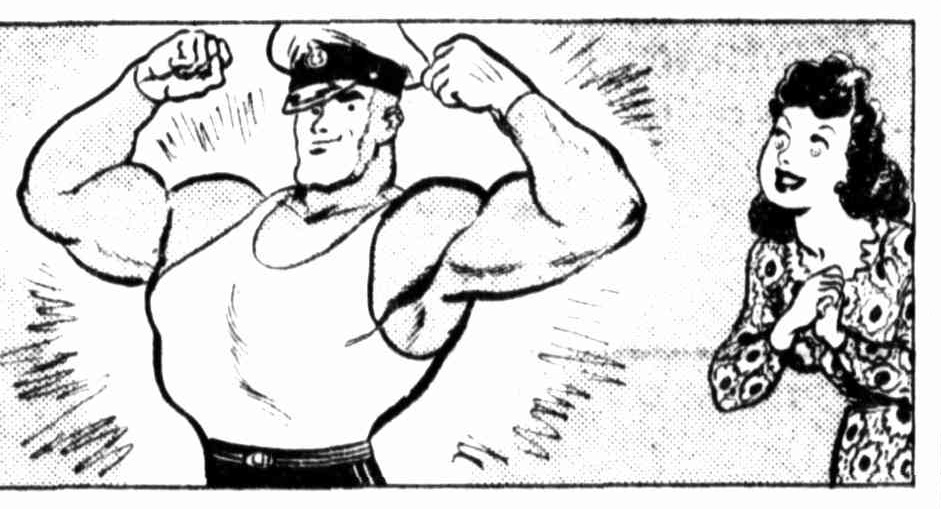
Detail from a 'Chesty Bond' comic-strip by Syd Miller, published in The Sun, 13 February 1942.

The 'Chesty Bond' character was a co-creation of Miller and Moloney. It was Ted Moloney who suggested to Miller the name "Chesty Bond" as "an image character" for their cartoon advertisements. The concept, as devised between the advertising account manager and the artist, was an "heroic straight man", who was "strong, ... kind, likeable, good-looking, but not a male model, and not a comic idiot". He would be "an Australian strong man... made super by or when he was wearing his Bonds singlet". Miller set about sketching ideas for the character. Chesty Bond's distinctive chin was inspired by the jawline of Jack Lang, New South Wales Premier during the Depression years, a feature of the politician's face invariably utilised by cartoonists and caricaturists.

The first Chesty Bond comic-strip was published in Sydney's The Sun newspaper on Tuesday, 19 March 1940. The comic-strip became a regular feature in The Sun newspaper in Sydney, appearing three times each week, every Tuesday, Wednesday, and Thursday. For a ten-month period, from May 1941 to February 1942, the Chesty Bond comic-strip was also published in Sydney's Daily Telegraph. From April 1942 the strip in The Sun was extended to four days a week, Monday to Thursday. From September 1942 Chesty Bond was extended further to five days a week, Monday to Friday, thus possibly becoming the world's first daily advertising comic-strip.

The central concept of the comic-strip was that Chesty Bond, with his characteristic jutting jaw and impressive physique, became a superhero while wearing his Bond's Athletic singlet. Miller's wartime strips incorporated patriotic messages and invited readers to contribute to civilian efforts such as buying War Savings Bonds. Syd Miller continued to draw the Chesty Bond strip until July 1945. It was taken over by Francis 'Will' Mahoney after Miller was contracted to draw the comic-strip Sandra for Melbourne's The Herald newspaper. The Chesty Bond comic-strip continued until 1963, drawn by a number of different artists, most notably by John Santry from 1950 until it was discontinued. Although the Chesty Bond comic-strip was clearly an advertisement, it proved to be immensely popular with the public. As a result of the successful campaign, Chesty Bond became the archetypal Australian hero synonymous with Australian masculinity and an icon recognised Australia-wide.

=== Newspaper work and comics ===
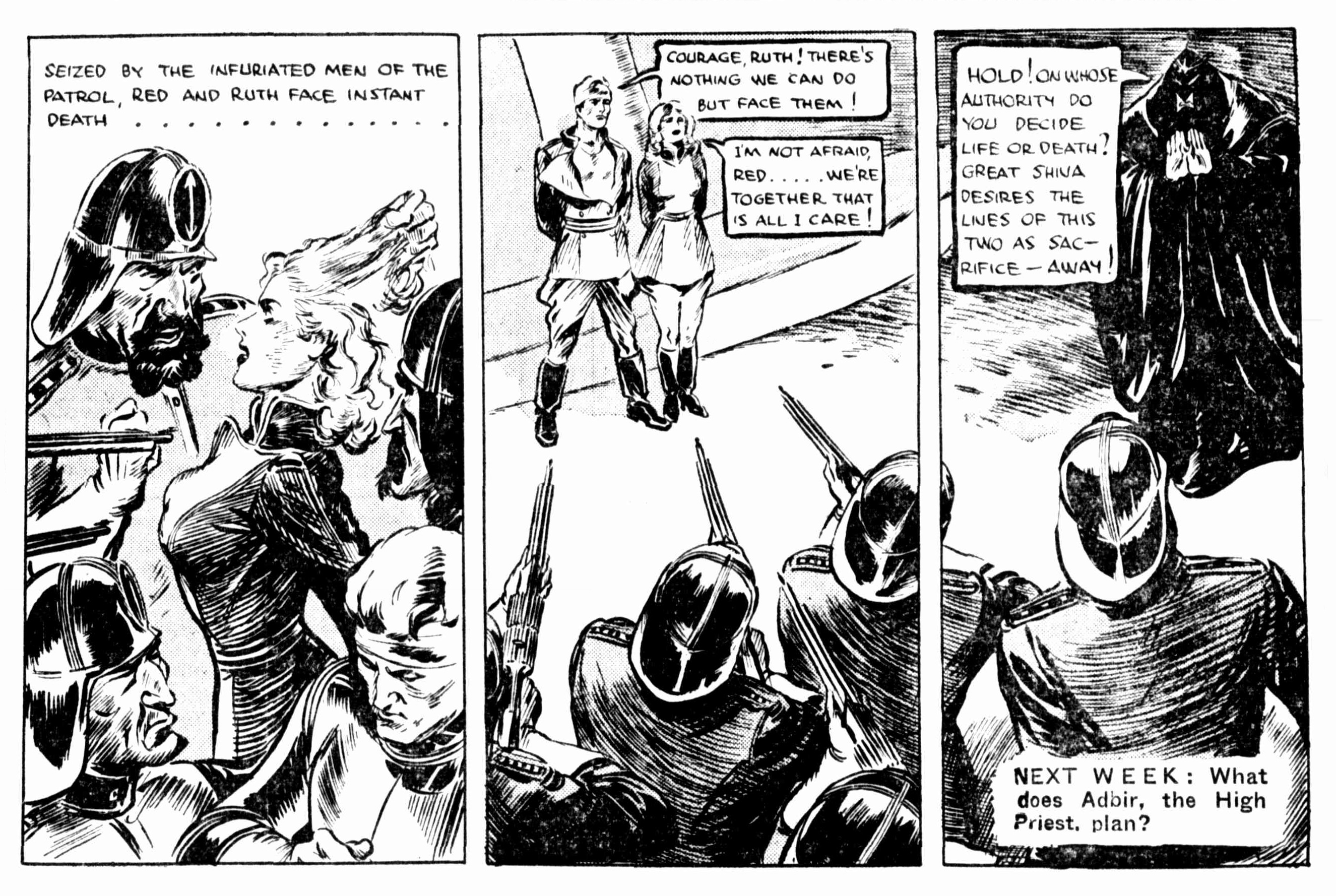
Panels from Syd Miller's serialised cartoon-strip, 'Red' Gregory (Smith's Weekly, 3 December 1938).

The 'Red' Gregory comic-strip, written and illustrated by Miller, was serialised in Smith's Weekly from July 1938 to April 1939. 'Red' Gregory was later reprinted, in two comic-book editions in 1942 and 1943.

From April to September 1939 a feature by Miller called So It Seems to Me was published in Smith's Weekly, made up of a small group of cartoons, often exploring the themes of "Mad Motorism" and "Inferiority-Complexitis". In May 1939 Miller introduced a new character, 'The Big Boss', a diminutive Napoleonic dictator with a penchant for goose-stepping and Nazi salutes. 'The Big Boss' was originally incorporated in Miller's So It Seems to Me feature, but by July 1939 it was being published as a separate weekly comic-strip. It remained a regular feature until early September.

A comic-strip by Miller called Over the Fence was published from December 1939 to Match 1940 in the early issues of ABC Weekly, a magazine produced by the Australian Broadcasting Commission.

In the early 1940s Miller wrote and illustrated a series of children's books, each of them with animal themes, published by Frank Johnson Publications. His Alphabet Book, published in 1941, features a series of colour images by Miller of Australian fauna, illustrating the letters of the alphabet. In the mid-1940s he collaborated with the writer Paul Amery to produce a couple of children's books published by Georgian House in Melbourne.

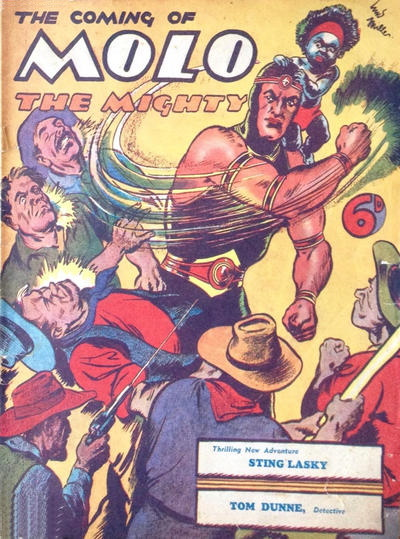
The cover of The Coming of Molo the Mighty, written, illustrated and published by Syd Miller.

In April 1940 the Australian government banned the importation of magazines and comics which were considered to "of no literary value". The publications affected were mostly of American origin. The purpose of the ban was to conserve the dollar currency exchange and was a part of wider import restrictions of goods from non-sterling countries to assist the war effort. The import restrictions had a far-reaching effect on publishing businesses in Australia. Local writers and illustrators were given new opportunities for staff and freelance work to meet the demand for reading material to replace the foreign publications. The import restrictions remained in place until 1959.

From 1940 to 1945 Miller was involved in the publishing of comic books, a number of which were under his own publishing label (initially recorded as "Syd. Miller, 43 Beaconsfield Parade, Lindfield" and from 1944 as "Syd Miller Publications"). Two of his publishing ventures were reprints of episodes of his comic-strip Red Gregory, previously serialised in Smith's Weekly. During this period he also contributed four episodes of a comic-strip titled 'Red Grainger' to a series of anthology comics published by others.

In about 1940 and 1943 Miller published two comic-book editions with covers featuring the character of 'Molo the Mighty'. The first, The Coming of Molo the Mighty, incorporated the title story by Miller, as well as a detective story by Stan Clements and science fiction by Len Such. The 'Molo' character had an obvious lineage from Miller's own Chesty Bond; the comic featured "the high-flying Molo... and his Aboriginal boy companion" who became involved in a series of "heroic encounters in the Australian outback". The second 'Molo' comic, The Return of Molo, had a greater diversity of contents: Miller's title story was joined by stories from Len Lawson and Albert de Vine, humorous comic-strips by Emile Mercier and a couple of non-fiction features, 'Nature's Queerosities', written and illustrated by Miller.

Miller served with the Volunteer Defence Corps in Sydney from 1942 to 1945, attaining the rank of lieutenant.

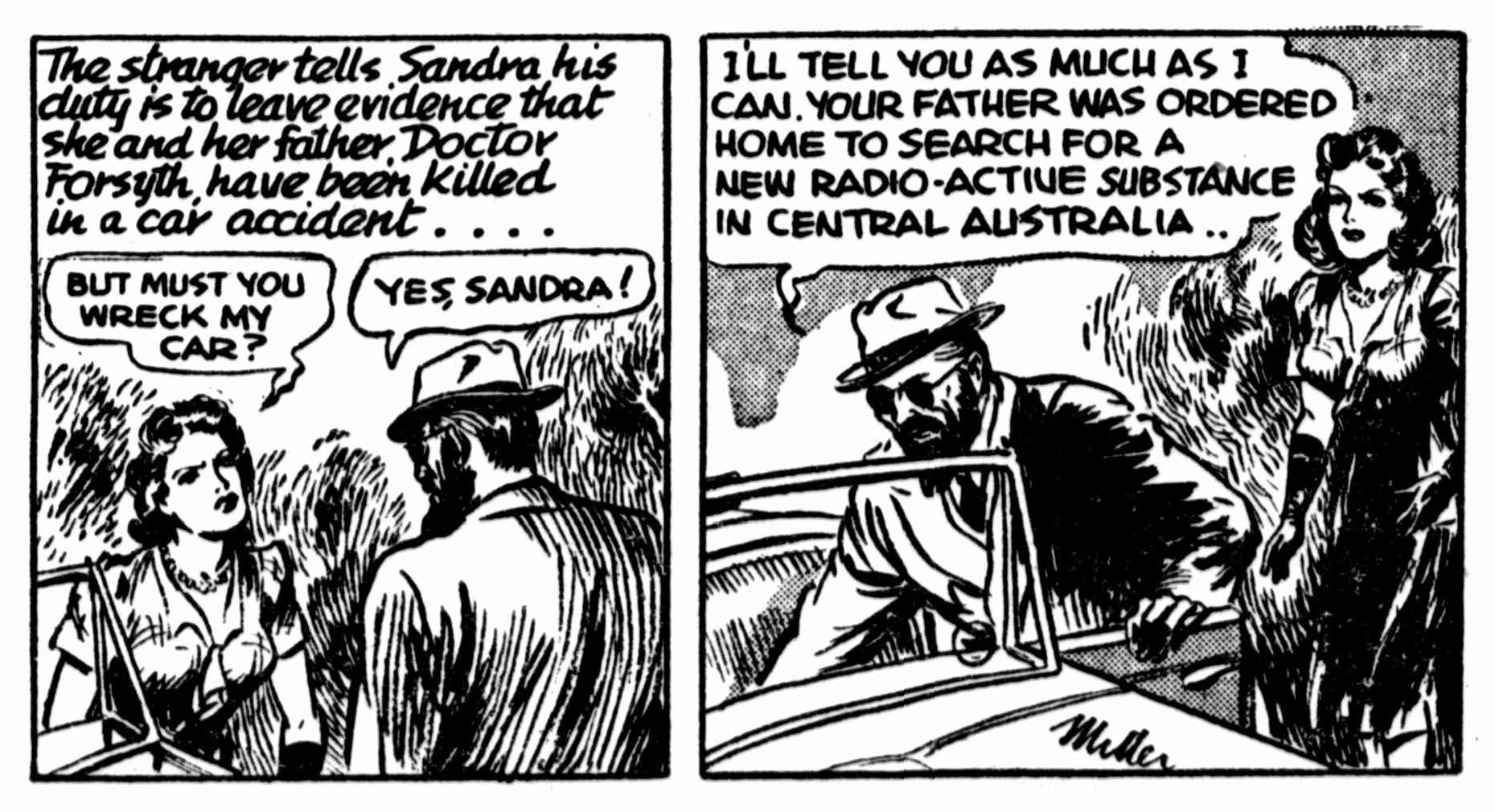
Panels from Syd Miller's serialised cartoon-strip, Sandra (published in Perth's Daily News, 4 January 1946).

Miller relinquished the job of drawing the Chesty Bond comic-strip in mid-1945 in order to work on the serialised Sandra strip. His 'Sandra' character first appeared in Melbourne's The Herald newspaper in an "adventure mystery" comic-strip titled Sandra: Murder in Studio 3, published daily (except Sundays) from late-July 1945. Sandra also began to be syndicated in Hobart's The Mercury and Adelaide's The News in July 1945 and Perth's Daily News in September 1945. 'Murder in Studio 3' concluded in The Herald in Melbourne in early November 1945, with a new Sandra episode starting on the following issue. The new episode, which also began to be serialised in Brisbane's Courier-Mail newspaper soon afterwards, had a specific Australian setting (rather than the generic noir feel of 'Murder in Studio 3'). Sandra was revealed to be the daughter of the scientist Dr. Forsyth, with the storyline based upon "a race to develop atomic power". Sandra was published in The Herald until early November 1946, when the comic-strip concluded (to be replaced by Miller's Rod Craig).

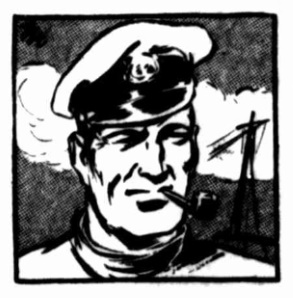
Syd Miller's 'Rod Craig' character, published in The Herald (Melbourne), 2 November 1946.

Rod Craig commenced in early November 1946 simultaneously in the Melbourne Herald, the Adelaide Advertiser, the Sydney Sun and the Brisbane Courier-Mail. In Brisbane the comic-strip was titled The White Goddess and in the other newspapers, Rod Craig or Adventures of Rod Craig. Adventures of Rod Craig also commenced in mid-November 1946 in the Newcastle Sun. Miller's comic-strip used the formula of a hero "whose patriotism and sense of adventure" refer directly to his war service. The eponymous hero, formerly of the Royal Australian Navy, is introduced as the owner of a converted patrol boat which he charters for cruises on the Great Barrier Reef. The dialogue in Miller's Rod Craig was written in the Australian vernacular of the post-war period and dealt with issues that reflected some of the preoccupations of the time such as black-market operators, Nazi war criminals and post-war migrants. In addition to appearing in newspapers throughout Australia, by 1950 the Rod Craig comic-strip was also being published in France and South America. In May 1950 a Rod Craig radio serial began to be broadcast on the Melbourne radio station 3DB. The serial was produced by Australian Radio Productions, the first Australian adventure strip to be serialised for radio. The radio serial was later extended to radio stations in other Australian states. The Rod Craig comic-strip continued to be serialised in Australian newspapers until 1955 (a record for a continuous comic-strip in Australia at that time).

Miller's animal-themed cartoon feature called Animalaughs, which appeared from December 1946 to September 1947 in The Herald and Weekly Times in Melbourne, as well as The Sun in Sydney and the Adelaide Advertiser, was also syndicated in England, Scotland and South Africa.

After Rod Craig finished, Miller created a new daily comic-strip called Us Girls, which appeared in the Melbourne Herald from December 1955 until 1957. Us Girls was reflective of mid-1950s Australia, featuring female fashions of the period and many references to the 1956 Olympic Games in Melbourne.

In 1957 Miller worked for the newly-formed Ajax Films producing television animation and sound-slide films. From the mid-1950s Miller created a second advertising comic, A Little Bear Will Fix It, promoting the sale of adhesive tape for Behr-Manning.

=== Later years ===
Miller retired in the mid-1960s but continued his creative pursuits, engaging in photography, fabricating copper sculptures and drawing (for the most part scraperboard illustrations of flora and fauna).

Miller's wife Susan died in November 1978. In 1983 Syd Miller suffered a severe stroke and was admitted to the Sydney Adventist Hospital in Wahroonga, where he died on 31 December 1983, aged 82 years.

== Gallery ==
A selection of images by Syd Miller
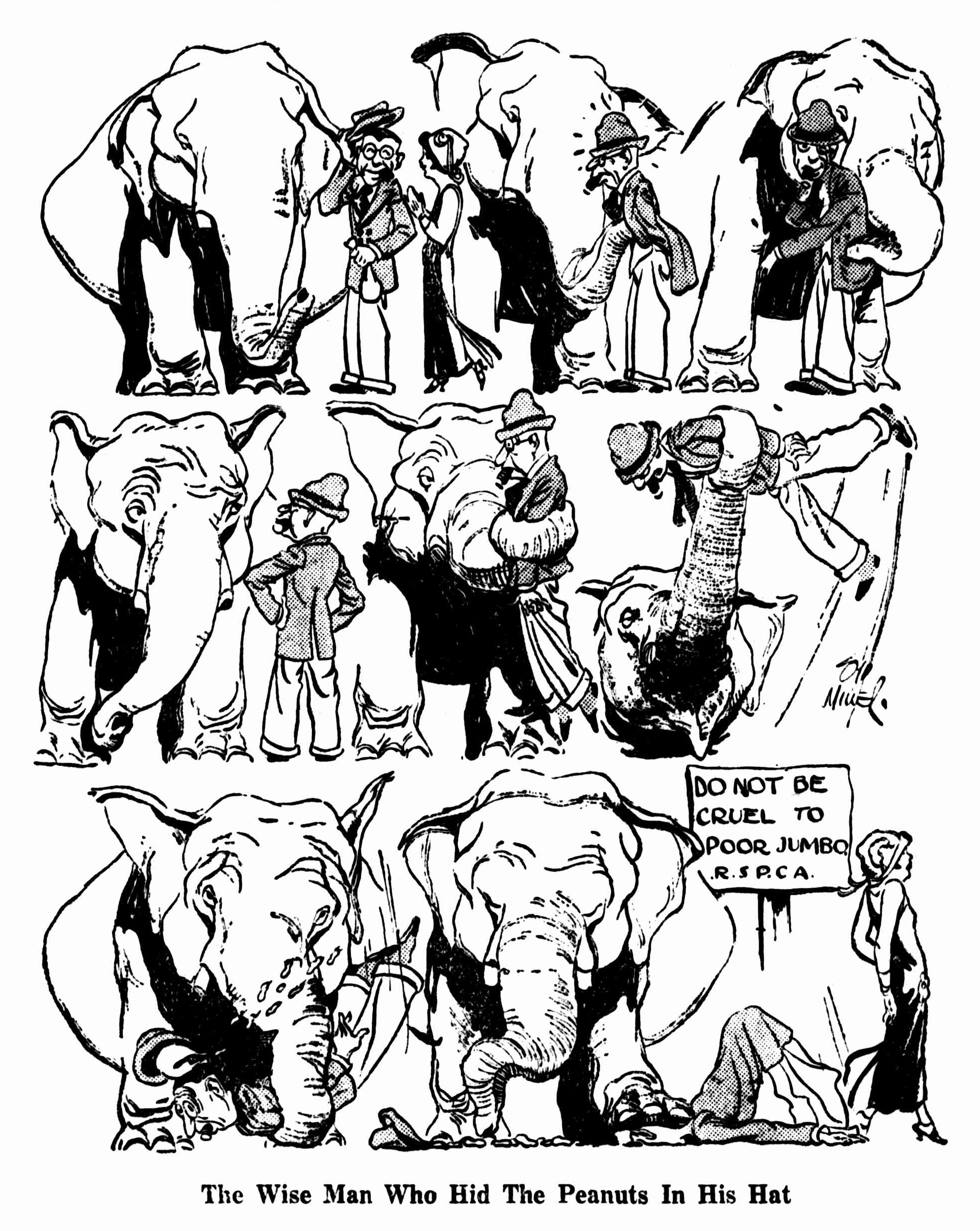
"The Wise Man Who Hid the Peanuts in His Hat", cartoon by Syd Miller (Smith's Weekly, 19 April 1924).

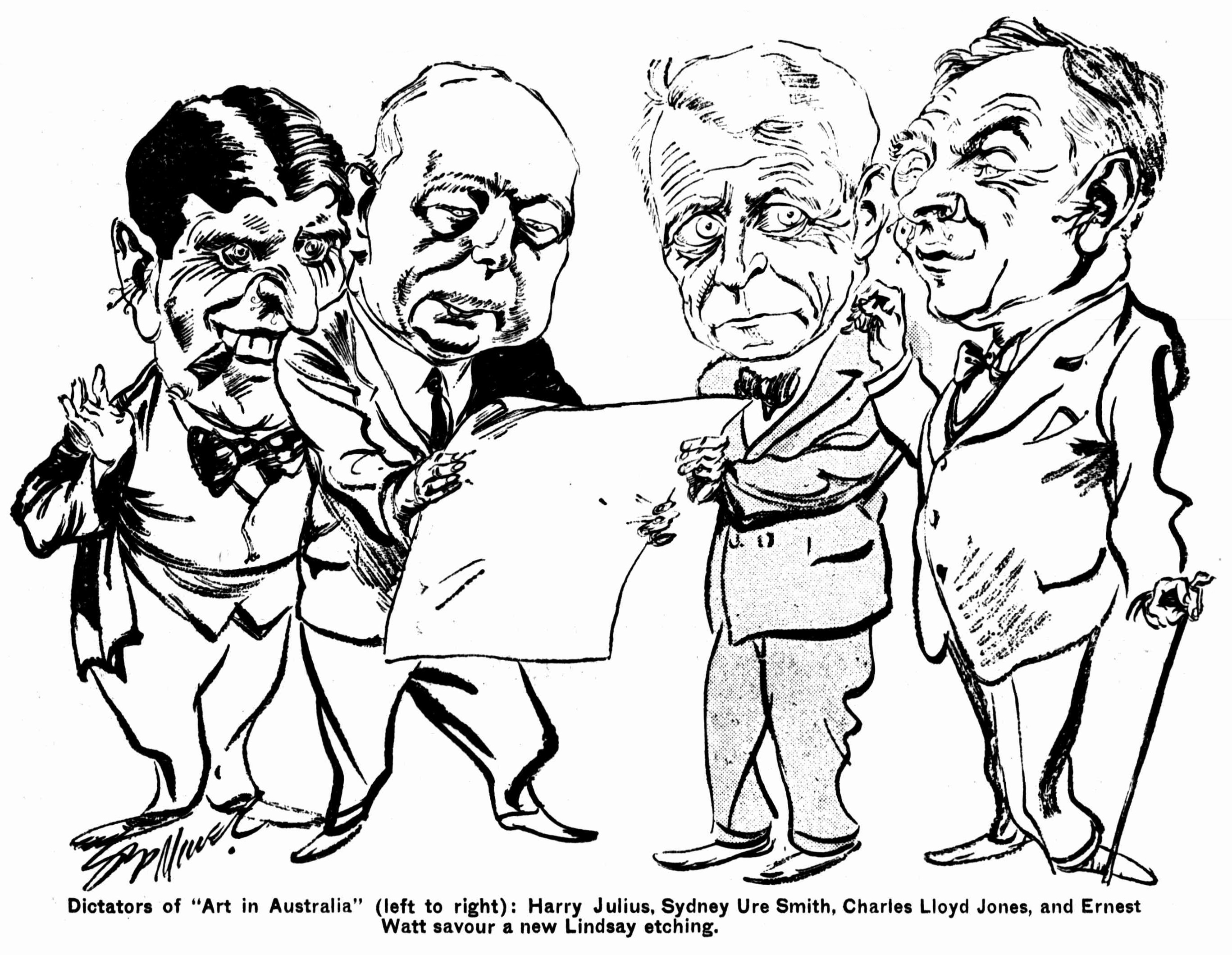
'Dictators of "Art in Australia" (left to right): Harry Julius, Sydney Ure Smith, Charles Lloyd Jones, and Ernest Watt savour a new Lindsay etching', caricatures by Syd Miller (published in Smith's Weekly, 14 May 1927).

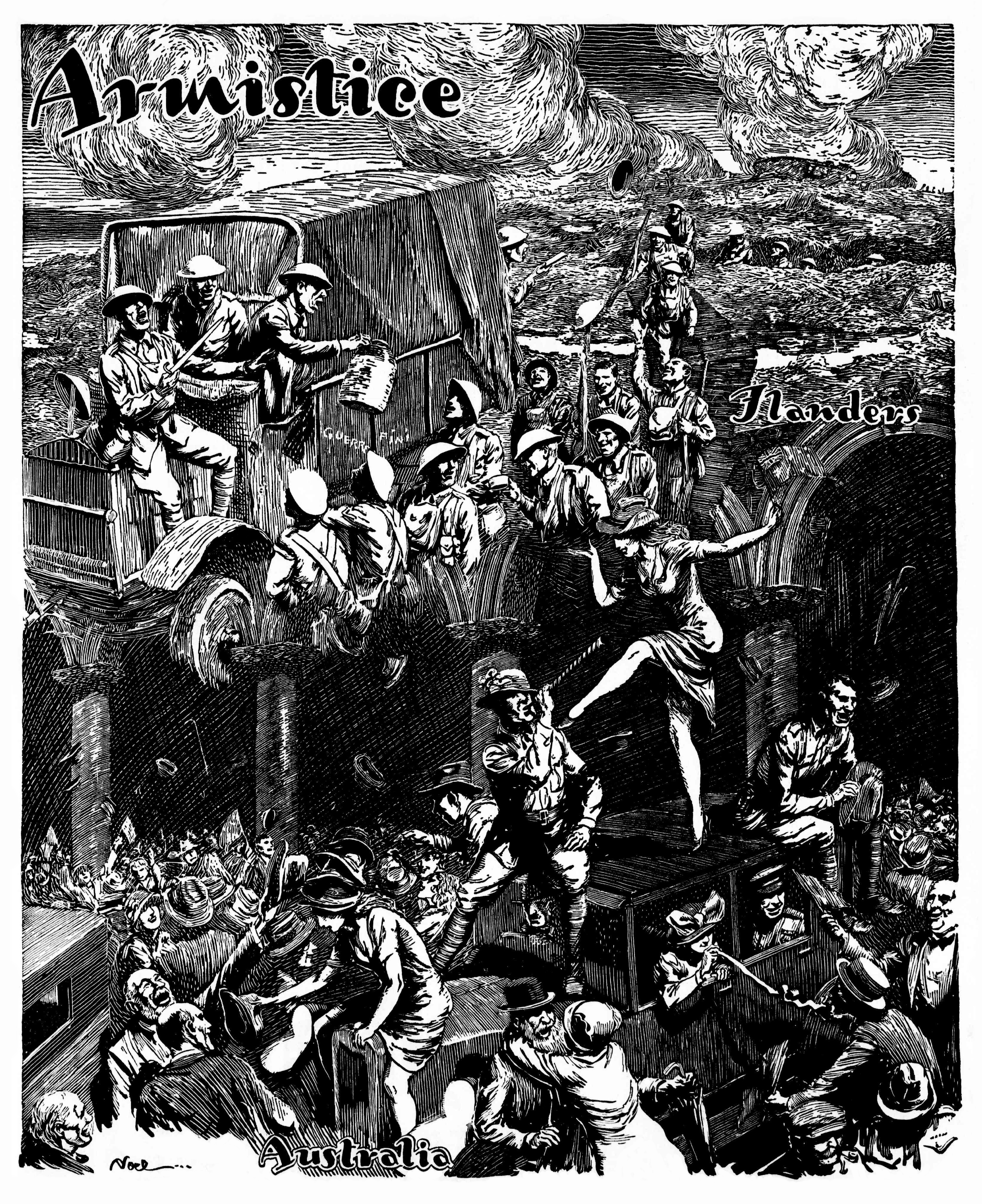
'"Smith's" Commemoration of the 15th Anniversary of Armistice', illustration by Syd Miller (scraperboard image; signed 'Noël'), published in Smith's Weekly, 11 November 1933.

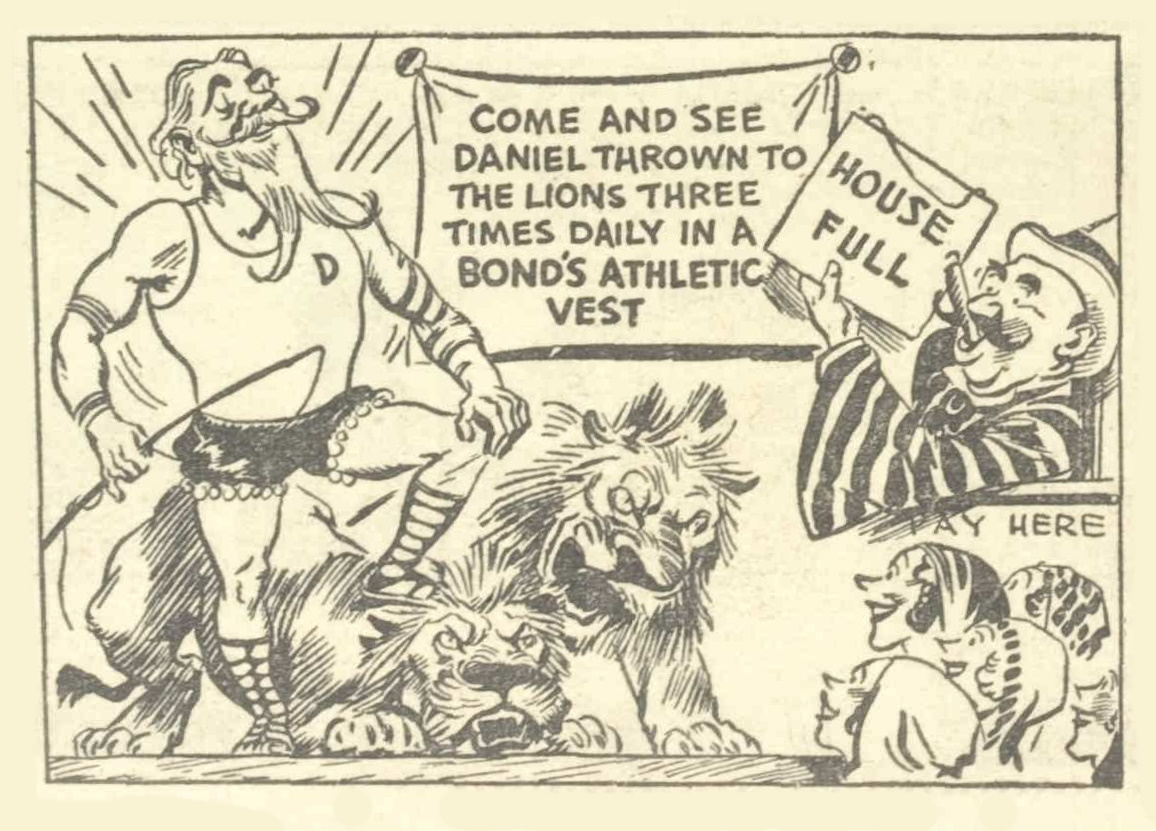
A panel from 'Embarrassing Moments From History: Daniel in the Lion's Den', comic-strip advertisement by Syd Miller (Australian Women's Weekly, 10 April 1937).

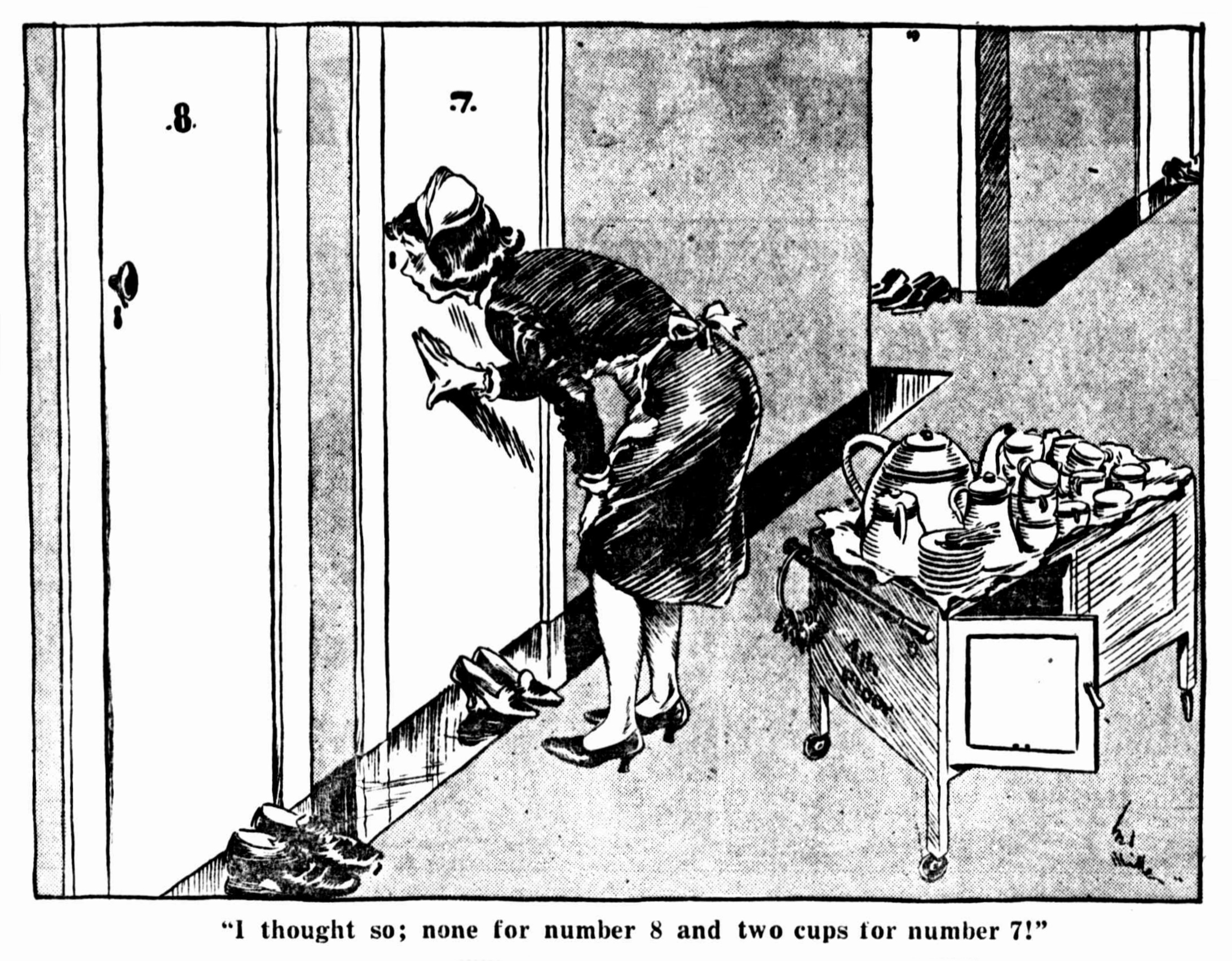
"I though so; none for number 8 and two cups for number 7!", cartoon by Syd Miller (Smith's Weekly, 21 September 1940).

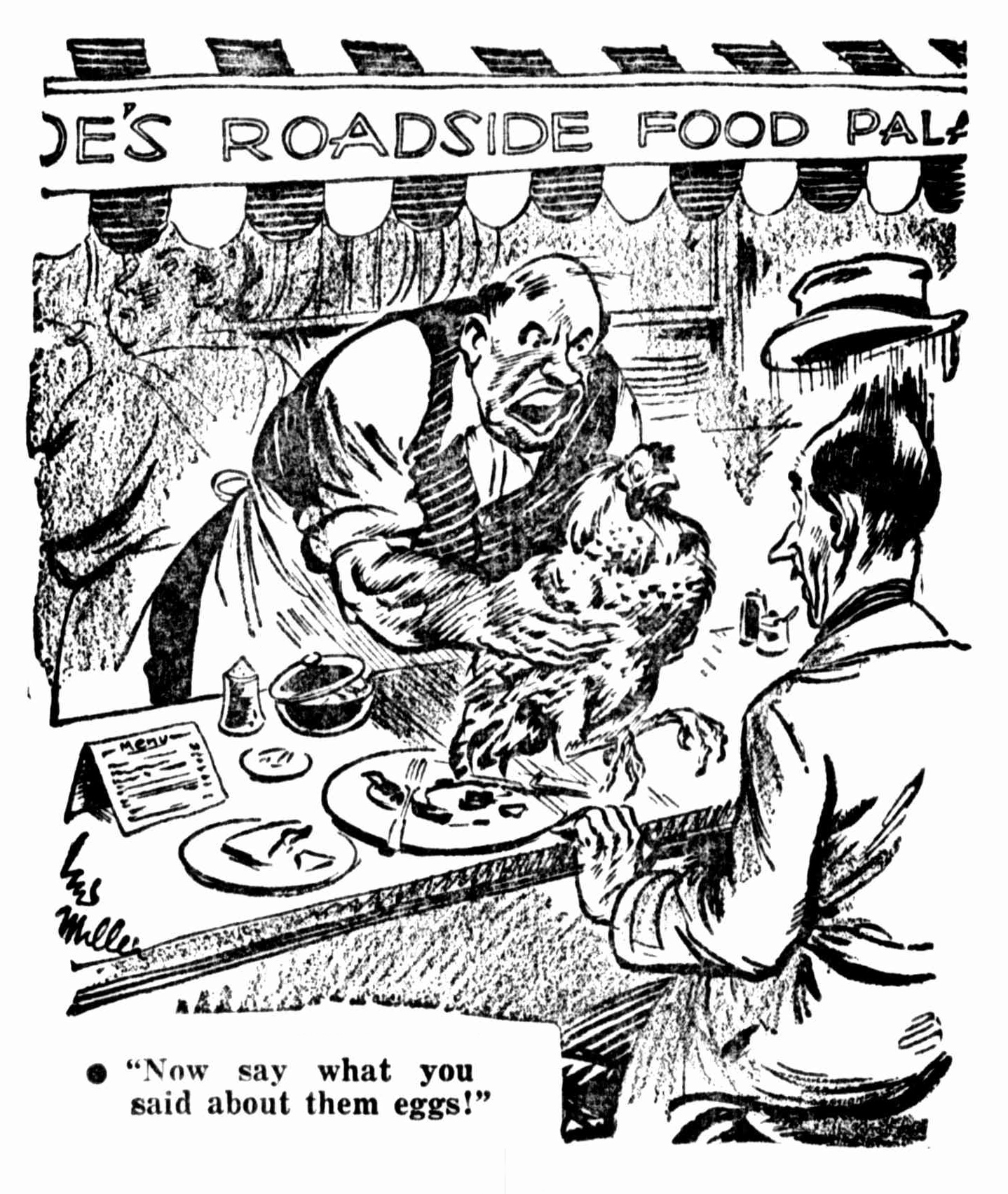
"Now say what you said about them eggs!"; cartoon by Syd Miller (Smith's Weekly, 28 December 1940).

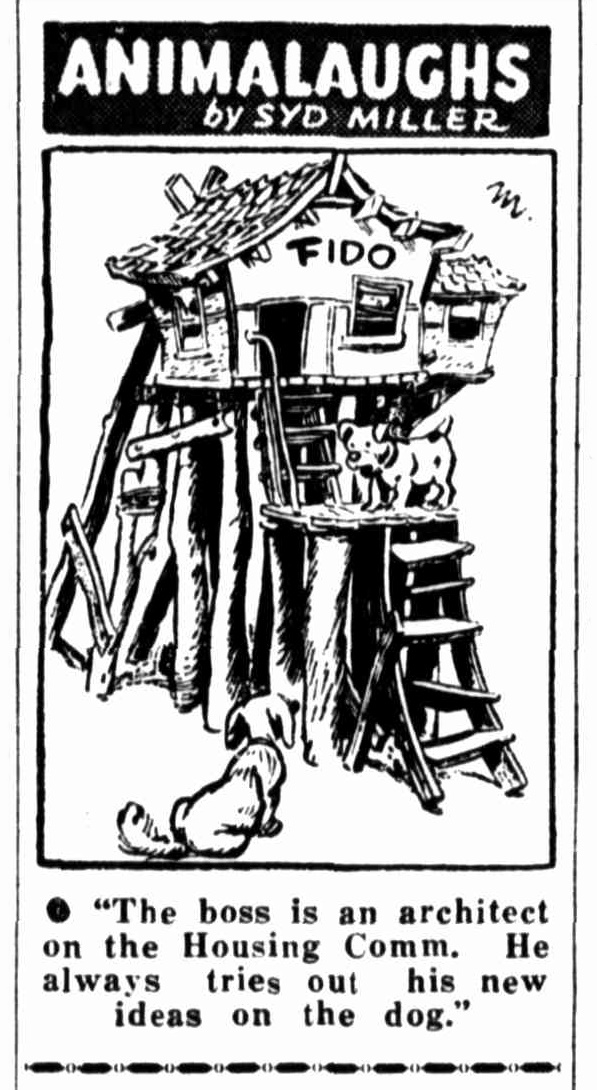
'Animalaughs' cartoon by Syd Miller, published in The Sun (Sydney), 14 August 1947.

== Publications ==
=== Comics ===
- The Coming of Molo the Mighty (1940) – by Syd Miller: cover; 'The Coming of Molo the Mighty' (24 pages) – published by Syd Miller, 43 Beaconsfield Parade, Lindfield.
- Zip Action (c. 1941) – by Syd Miller: 'Red Grainger' – publisher details not known.
- Adventure (c. 1941) – by Syd Miller: 'Red Grainger' – publisher details not known.
- Smash Adventure Comics (November 1941) – by Syd Miller: 'The World's Queerest Dogs' (one page) – published by Syd Miller, 43 Beaconsfield Parade, Lindfield.
- Speed Comics (c. 1941) – by Syd Miller: 'Red Grainger' (five pages) – published by E. E. Jolliffe, 4 McLeod Street, Mosman.
- Thriller Comics (1942) – by Syd Miller: 'Red Grainger' – publisher details not known.
- Red Gregory: The Glass People (c. 1942) – by Syd Miller: cover; 'Characters from "The Glass People"' (one page); 'Red Gregory: The Glass People' (24 pages); 'Nature's Queerosities' (three pages) – published by Syd Miller, 43 Beaconsfield Parade, Lindfield.
- Red Gregory: The Little People (c. 1943) – by Syd Miller: cover; 'Red Gregory: The Little People' – publisher details not known (probably Syd Miller).
- The Return of Molo (c. 1943) – by Syd Miller: cover; 'The Return of Molo'; 'Nature's Queerosities' (two pages) – published by Syd Miller, 43 Beaconsfield Parade, Lindfield.
- Council of Four (c. 1944) – published by Syd Miller Publications.
- Monster Comic No. 1 (July 1945) – no details.
- Monster Comic for Australian Boys No. 2 (August 1945) – by Syd Miller: 'Pete and Pinky' (one-line comic strip; one page) – published by Syd Miller Publications.

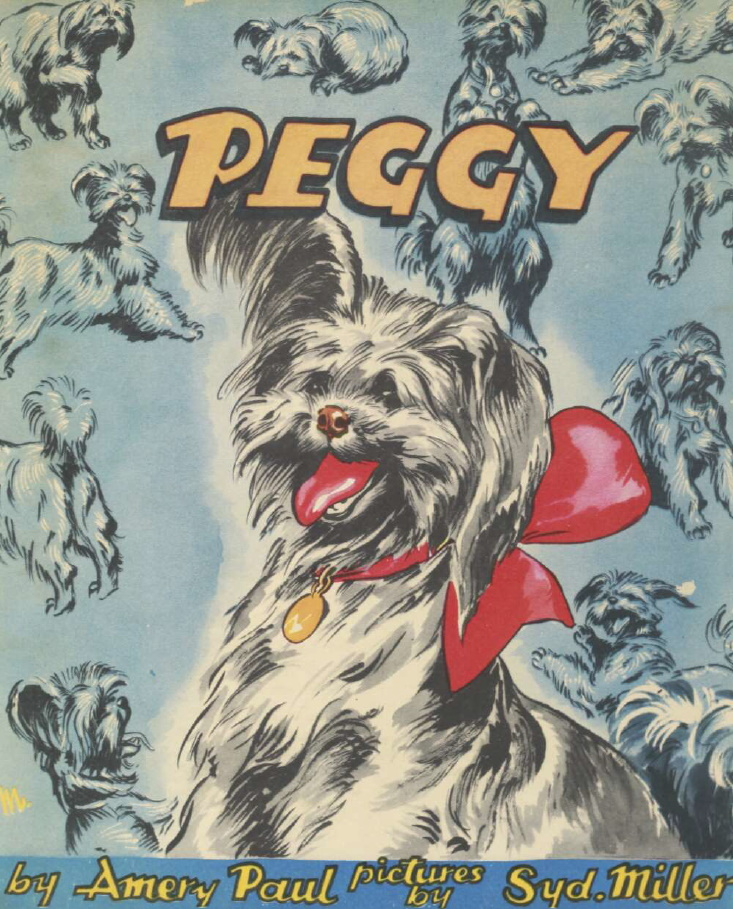
The cover of Peggy (1944), written by Paul Amery and illustrated by Syd Miller.

- Monster Comic No. 3 (September 1945) – by Syd Miller: 'Pete and Pinky' (one-line comic strips; two pages) – published by Syd Miller Publications.
- Monster Comic No. 4 (October 1945) – by Syd Miller: 'Pete and Pinky' (one-line comic strips; two pages) – published by Syd Miller Publications.
- Monster Comic No. 5 (November 1945) – no details.
- Monster Comic No. 6 (December 1945) – no details.

=== Others ===
- Syd Miller (c. 1940), Hop-Happy: General Purpose Mascot of All Services.
- Syd Miller (1941), Alphabet Book (Sydney: Frank Johnson).
- Syd Miller (c. 1941), The Four Bears (Sydney: Frank Johnson).
- Syd Miller (c. 1941), Penny the Puppy (Sydney: Frank Johnson).
- Syd Miller (c. 1941), Zoo Zoo Mixed (Sydney: Frank Johnson).
- Paul Amery & Syd Miller (illustrations) (1944), Peggy (Melbourne: Georgian House).
- Paul Amery & Syd Miller (illustrations) (1945), Tea Party for Poffinella (Melbourne: Georgian House).
- Frank Clune & Syd Miller (illustrations) (1951), Somewhere in New Guinea: A Companion to Prowling through Papua (Sydney: Angus and Robertson).
