= R. C. Packer =

Australian businessman (1879–1934)

- Born: Robert Clyde Packer; 24 July 1879; Hobart, Tasmania, Australia
- Died: 12 April 1934 (aged 54) aboard RMS Maloja in the Mediterranean Sea, off the coast of Marseille, France
- Occupation: Journalist
- Years active: 1899–1930
- Known for: Founder of Smith's Weekly and Australian Associated Newspapers
- Spouse: Ethel Hewson (m. 1903)
- Children: Frank Packer; Kathleen Mary Packer
- Relatives: Packer family

Robert Clyde Packer (24 July 1879 – 12 April 1934), known as R. C. Packer, was an Australian journalist, media proprietor and founder of Australia's Packer media dynasty, which would later own Publishing & Broadcasting Limited and later held a controlling interest in Crown Resorts through Consolidated Press Holdings.

== Early life ==
Packer was born in Tasmania, the son of a senior customs official, Arthur Howard Packer (died 20 August 1912) and Margaret Fitzmaurice Packer (née Clyde; 1855–1915). Arthur Packer was a son of Frederick Alexander Packer and his wife Augusta (née Gow). Both were members of the Royal Academy of Music in London and in 1852 arrived in Hobart, where he took up the position of organist at St David's Cathedral in Davey Street. The Packers were originally from the Reading area in the Thames Valley and Frederick's father was a master pianoforte manufacturer with premises on London's Oxford Street.

Augusta was the granddaughter of Scotland's famous fiddler and composer of antiquity, Niel Gow of Dunkeld. Her father was Nathaniel Gow, a highly regarded musician and composer himself, who had a shop in Princes Street, Edinburgh in the early to mid-19th century.

== Career ==
R.C., as he came to be called, became a journalist first in Hobart, later in Cairns, Bellingen, Macksville, Tamworth, Dubbo (where he edited The Dubbo Liberal, owned by a young widow) and finally Sydney in 1908, where he joined the staff of the Sunday Times, became editor in 1913, then sub-editor with The Sydney Sun. In 1918 he joined with James Joynton Smith and Claude McKay in the foundation of Smith's Weekly, followed in 1923 by the Daily Guardian. Notable achievements included launching the first Miss Australia beauty contest at the Daily Guardian in 1926. He left Smith's Weekly in 1930 in possession of a half share in the paper (he had helped purchase McKay's interest in 1927) and substantial holdings in Australian Associated Newspapers, publishers of The Daily Telegraph and The Sunday Sun (who had bought out the Daily Guardian and Sunday Guardian in 1929).

== Personal life ==
Robert Clyde Packer married Ethel Maude Hewson (1874–1947), the youngest daughter of Rev. Frank Hewson, on 13 July 1903 at St Matthias Church, Paddington. They had two children; Frank Packer (1906–1974) and Kathleen Mary Packer (1910–2000), known later as Lady Stening, wife of Sir George Stening (1904–1996).

== Death ==
Packer died of heart failure at age 54 while on the P&O ship, Maloja. The ship was cruising on the Mediterranean Sea at the time. Packer was pronounced dead at Marseille, France and his son Frank inherited his publishing interests, expanding them into a formidable media empire, which was expanded still further by Frank's son Kerry and grandson, James. He was buried on 21 May 1934 in the Packer family mausoleum at South Head Cemetery. He left an estate valued at £54,706 to his wife, son and daughter. His wife, Ethel Packer died in Wellington, New Zealand on 1 April 1947, aged 72 years.

According to Gerald Stone, in Compulsive Viewing, the Packer fortune is reputed to have been founded on a stroke of luck, when he found 10 shillings at a Tasmanian race track and put it on a winning horse at twelve to one. It was enough to pay his way to the mainland, to begin his newspaper career.
