= Eric Jolliffe =

Australian cartoonist and illustrator

- Born: 31 January 1907; Portsmouth, England
- Died: 16 November 2001 (aged 94); Central Coast, New South Wales, Australia
- Occupations: Cartoonist, illustrator, artist (painter)

Eric Ernest Jolliffe OAM (31 January 1907 – 16 November 2001) was an Australian cartoonist and illustrator.

== Early life ==
Born in Portsmouth, England, he was the youngest boy in a family of twelve children. The family migrated to Perth, Western Australia, in 1911 before moving to Sydney after six months, where they settled in Balmain. Jolliffe left school at the age of fifteen and spent the next six years in New South Wales and Queensland, working as a boundary rider, rabbit trapper and in shearing sheds.

== Artistic career ==
A visit to Angus & Robertson bookstore, while visiting his family in Sydney, led to the discovery of a book on drawing. He afterwards reflected: "I learned to my surprise that art wasn't necessarily a gift divine but a craft that could be studied and worked at".

Jolliffe enrolled in an introductory course at East Sydney Technical College (now the National Art School), where his teachers commented on his lack of talent. During the Great Depression he worked as a window cleaner, during which time he inundated The Bulletin with cartoons, which they initially rejected. Eventually they began to buy his cartoons and by the beginning of World War II he became a regular contributor, taking over Andy from Arthur Horner. During the war, he served as a camouflage officer with the RAAF and spent time in Arnhem Land.

After the war, he joined Smith's Weekly but resigned and began freelancing by selling his cartoon strips Saltbush Bill and Witchetty's Tribe to Pix magazine. He was particularly fond of "bush" subjects. Another cartoon strip, Sandy Blight, appeared in Sydney's Sun-Herald. In 1973, Jolliffe began publishing his own magazine, Jolliffe's Outback.

== Legacy ==
George Blaikie recalled in 1979 that Jolliffe "had humped the bluey and toiled at all kinds of farm and station jobs. Wherever he went he sketched the minutiae most people failed to see – shacks and sheds, funny old gates and tree stumps they hinged on, bark roofs, billabongs and cows in bogs. Such authentic reference was poured into his gags and he became our most brilliant interpreter of the countryside."

Australian Aborigines figured largely in Jolliffe's work, including in his numerous pen and pencil portraits in Witchetty's Tribe. Jim Hodge observed that "sensitivity without sentiment describes his approach" and Tony Stephens noted that "Joliffe made Aboriginal men hunters with a sense of humour" and "the women as beautiful as ... models".

Jolliffe's cartoons enjoyed great success with the Australian reading public. Saltbush Bill ran "in Pix magazine for almost 50 years from 1945" and his other series experienced similar success.

== Personal life ==
From 1932, Jolliffe was married to the Scottish-born May H. Clark. She died in Chatswood in 1993. Their daughter Margaret ("Meg") had died in 1989.

He died on 16 November 2001 at the age of 94. His funeral service was held at Ourimbah on the Central Coast of New South Wales.

== Honours and awards ==
- 2009: Member of Hall of Fame of the Australian Cartoonists' Association
- 1998: Medal of the Order of Australia (OAM) for "service to art as a cartoonist and illustrator"
- 1985, 1986: Stanley Award: "Single Gag Cartoonist of the Year"
- 1960, 1961: Sydney Savage Club Cartoonist Award

== See also ==
- Bush carpentry
- Minties
- Slab hut
