= Arcadia Hotel, Sydney =

Defunct hotel in Sydney, Australia

Arcadia Hotel
- Interactive map of the Arcadia Hotel area
- Former names: Imperial Arcade Hotel

General information
- Status: Demolished
- Type: Hotel
- Location: Pitt Street, Sydney, New South Wales, Australia
- Coordinates: 33°52′12″S 151°12′32″E
- Demolished: 1961
- Client: James Joynton Smith

Other information
- Number of rooms: 145 – 162

The Arcadia Hotel was a 150-room hotel in Sydney, Australia, developed by James Joynton Smith, on the site occupied today by Westfield Sydney.

== History ==
Formerly named the Imperial Arcade Hotel, Smith had worked in the building as managing director of the Grand Central Coffee Palace. He acquired the lease for the old hotel in 1896 for £12 per week, eventually purchasing and renaming it the Arcadia.

The publican's licence, previously held by William Charles Parkes, was transferred to Smith on 31 July 1899.

In September 1899, the hotel narrowly escaped a fire in the adjoining Tivoli Theatre. Six rooms on the third floor, on the northern side were damaged.

On 2 November 1922, the publican's licence of the hotel was transferred from Vincent Walsh to Otto Camphin, and later, on 26 February 1936, from Otto Camphin to Edward Thomas Pearson Meldrum, an accountant, who held the licence until at least August 1948. Meldrum died on 12 June 1957. The licence was also held for a short time by Frank Astby in 1941.

Reports show there were 163 rooms at one point, with availability to the public ranging from 145 to 162.

The building housing the Imperial Arcade and Arcadia Hotel was demolished in 1961.

== See also ==
- List of hotels in Australia
