= George Blaikie =

Australian author and journalist

George Neil Blaikie (5 May 1915 – 12 October 1995) was an Australian author and journalist.

Blaikie was born in Sydney and educated at Sydney Grammar School and Melbourne University. He joined Smith's Weekly in December 1931, after his bank manager father had impressed on Smith's Weekly owner Joynton Smith, a customer, what an asset the boy would be. Blaikie was still with the paper in October 1950 when it closed.

Blaikie later worked for The Courier-Mail in Brisbane. His series Our Strange Past began in 1951 in The Mail as a continuation of the series Famous Disasters and in 1952 in The Western Mail and was syndicated across Australia. It ran for 34 years as feature in The Australian. He also ran a feature "Great Women of History" in The Australian Women's Weekly in 1982.

== Bibliography ==
- Scandals of Australia's Strange Past Rigby Ltd, Adelaide 1963
- Skeletons From Australia's Strange Past Rigby Ltd, Adelaide 1964
- Remember Smith's Weekly? Angus & Robertson Ltd, London 1967
- Great Australian Scandals Rigby Ltd Adelaide 1979 ISBN 0-7270-1008-5
- Wild Women of Sydney Rigby Ltd, Adelaide 1980 ISBN 0-7270-1394-7
- Scandals Strange But True – Fascinating stories from Australia's incredible past, John Fairfax Marketing, Sydney, 1984 ISBN 0-909558-52-3
- Great Women of History John Fairfax Marketing 1984? ISBN 0-909558-84-1
