= Peter Hardwick (rugby union) =

England international rugby union player (1877–1924)

- Full name: Peter Fenton Hardwick
- Born: 15 May 1877 Tynemouth, England
- Died: 13 February 1924 (aged 46) North Shields, England

Rugby union career
- Position: Forward
International career
| Years | Team | Apps | (Points) |
| 1902–04 | England | 8 | (0) |

Peter Fenton Hardwick (15 May 1877 – 13 February 1924) was an English international rugby union player.

Born in Tynemouth, Hardwick was a forward and started out with North Shields West End RFC. He spent most of his career with Percy Park and was a Northumberland representative player. From 1902 to 1904, Hardwick was capped eight times for England. He worked as a foreman caulker with Smith's Dock Company in North Shields.

== See also ==
- List of England national rugby union players
