= Claude Eric Fergusson McKay =

Australian journalist and publicist of Scottish descent

Claude McKay (19 July 1878 – 21 February 1972) was an Australian journalist and publicist of Scottish descent born in Kilmore, Victoria.

== Journalism ==
He worked on the Kilmore Advertiser as jack-of-all-trades then as a journalist in Seymour, Melbourne, Warrnambool and Bendigo before moving to Brisbane in 1902, where he was deputy music and theatre critic for the Brisbane Courier and then around 1905, he moved to Sydney writing theatre advertisements as well as freelancing for several minor newspapers.

He worked as a publicist for Wonderland Circus.

McKay worked as secretary and publicist for J.C. Williamson from 1905 to 1919. He helped publicise the conscription campaign for prime minister W.M. Hughes, who became a friend and supporter. In 1918, Williamsons released him to manage publicity for the Eighth War Loan, earning the admiration of Joynton Smith, then lord mayor of Sydney and chairman of the War Loan Committee. He later went on to write Smith's memoirs.

He founded Smith's Weekly in 1919 with his friend Robert Clyde Packer, funded by Joynton Smith with the assistance of J. F. Archibald. A vigorous patriotic newspaper, unafraid to take sides and loaded with comment, minor features and cartoons, it was an immediate hit with the public. McKay and Packer, who had one-third shares each, became wealthy men.

He served as editor of Smith's Weekly until 1927, when he sold his share to Smith and Packer after a dispute, possibly over journalistic ethics. He retired to England, determined to enjoy his wealth, but returned in 1930?? determined to help revive the paper's fortunes, which had been hit hard by the Depression.

Although Smith welcomed McKay, the paper's new editor, Frank Marien, and director Frank Packer (Clyde's son) were hostile to his reappearance and he was relegated to controlling its financial affairs from an upper floor of the building. Once those affairs were put in order he retired again.

In 1939, at the age of 61 and with the paper's fortunes again at a low ebb, McKay and a band of investors took financial control, with McKay was once more appointed editor. With the outbreak of World War II its circulation revived briefly, before falling sales forced its closure in 1950.

== Personal ==
In 1907 he married Dorothy Hope Sidney.

He puffed cigarettes endlessly.

He was an excellent golfer (his son Tom was 1934 Australian amateur champion).

== Publications ==
- Theatrical Caricatures with Harry Julius (1912)
- My Life Story (1927) ghostwritten memoirs of Joynton Smith
- This is the Life (1961) memoirs

== Sources ==
- Wilde, W H The Oxford Companion to Australian Literature, Oxford University Press 2nd ed. 1994 ISBN 0-19-553381-X
- http://adbonline.anu.edu.au/biogs/A150273b.htm
