= Sidney Miller =

Sidney Miller may refer to:

- Sid Miller (politician) (born 1955), Texas politician
- Sidney Miller (musician) (born 1980), American record producer and musician
- Sidney Miller (actor) (1916–2004), American actor, director and songwriter
- Sidney Álvaro Miller Filho (1945-1980), Brazilian singer-songwriter
- Sidney Miller, character in Ah, Wilderness!, a 1935 American film adaptation of Eugene O'Neill's play of the same name
