= Joan Morrison =

Australian cartoonist

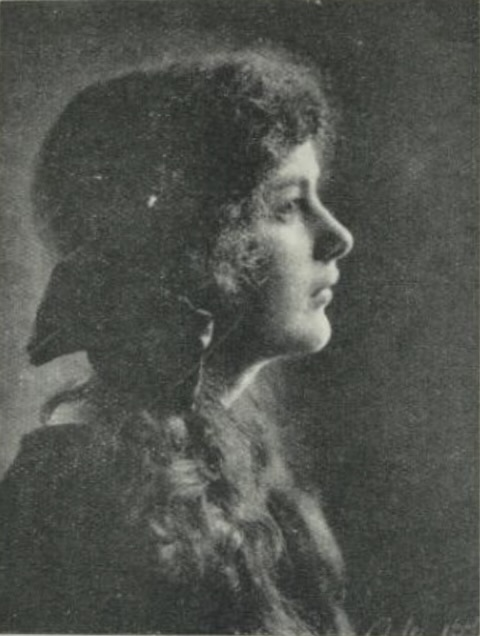
- Morrison in 1927
- Born: 1911; Wrotham, Kent, England
- Died: 18 March 1969 (aged 57–58)
- Occupations: Cartoonist, book illustrator
- Known for: The Morrison Girl

Joan Morrison (1911 – 18 March 1969) was an Australian cartoonist and book illustrator. She signed her work Morrison and is best known for drawing "The Morrison Girl".

== Early life and education ==
Born in Wrotham, Kent, England in 1911, Joan Morrison moved with her family to Tasmania three years later. Her earliest work was published in the and Tasmanian Mail, including the Christmas editions of the latter in 1927 and 1929.

She moved to Sydney to study with Rayner Hoff at East Sydney Technical College, where her work was described as having "originality and verve in every line". Hoff stressed the importance of studying anatomy, "especially for black-and-white artists a full knowledge of the skeleton and the muscles of the human body is absolutely necessary, if one's work is to be at once vigorous and correct." While still a student, she was encouraged by Norman Lindsay to create illustrations for a Hans Christian Andersen book. While still at Tech she won first prize for a figure study in the 1930 Australian Watercolour Institute's exhibition.

== Career ==
In 1929, Morrison and Mollie Horseman were the first two women to be appointed cartoonists by Smith's Weekly. Both were caricatured and written up in that publication in July 1932. By 1935 she was known as "creator of the whimsical Morrison girl, a very imp of mischief with all the allure of audacious innocence". In an article about cartooning in Walkabout, Jack Horner described her depictions of women as "lively Australian demi-mondaines". The Morrison girl took over in popularity from Virgil Reilly's Virgil girl in Smith's Weekly.

In 1940 she met English critic Neville Cardus who commented on her work, "She has depicted the Australian girl in all her grace as no other artist has succeeded in doing." Her cartoons were popular with men serving overseas in the Army, Navy and Air Force during World War II.

Morrison worked as a freelance illustrator from 1950.

== Personal and death ==
On 2 January 1936 Morrison married Alan Lyon O'Connor Wilkinson (31 December 1902–27 July 1987). He served in the RAN during WWII and later worked as a port pilot and ships' surveyor.

Morrison died in Sydney on 18 March 1969.
