= Edward Scorfield =

England international rugby union player

- Full name: Edward Scafe Scorfield
- Born: 21 April 1882 Preston, Northumberland, England
- Died: 11 December 1965 (aged 83) Mosman, Sydney, NSW, Australia

Rugby union career
- Position: Forward
International career
Years	Team	Apps	(Points)
1910	England	1	(0)

Edward Scafe Scorfield (21 April 1882 – 11 December 1965) was an English international rugby union player.

Scorfield was born in Preston, Northumberland, and attended Royal Grammar School in Newcastle upon Tyne.

A forward, Scorfield played his rugby for Percy Park and represented Northumberland from 1910 to 1913. He gained an England cap during the 1910 Five Nations, featuring in a win over France at Paris.

Scorfield served with the 66th Field Company of the Royal Engineers in World War I, attaining the rank of sergeant. He received the Order of St. George and was twice mentioned in dispatches.

Formerly a marine architect, Scorfield worked as a cartoonist for the Newcastle Weekly Chronicle after the war and moved to Sydney in 1925 to succeed Norman Lindsay as cartoonist at The Bulletin, remaining in the role until 1961.

== See also ==
- List of England national rugby union players
