= Frank Dunne =

Australian cartoonist

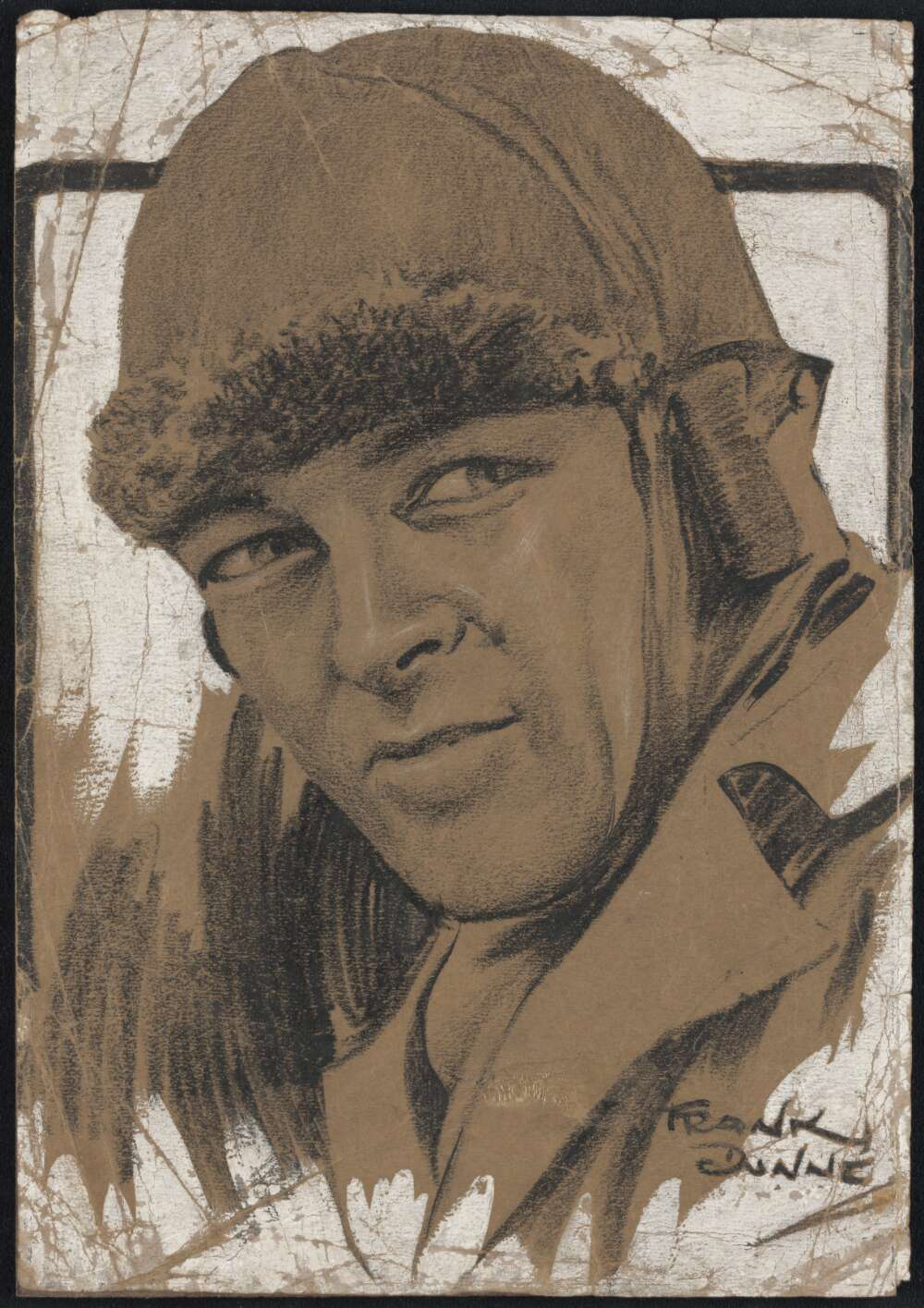
Portrait of Bert Hinker, by Frank Dunne, circa 1930

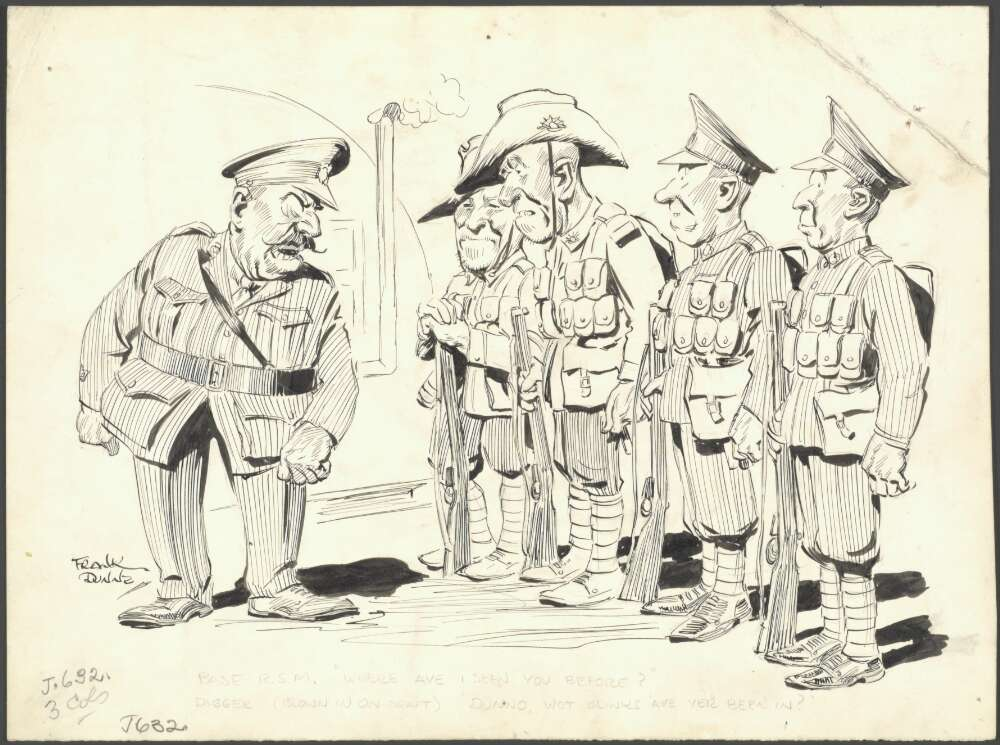
Parade at the base, by Frank Dunne, 1914

Lawrence Francis Dunne (1898 – 23 December 1937), generally known as "Frank" but also as "Beau" was an Australian cartoonist, born in Boorowa, near Harden, New South Wales.

While apprenticed as a process-engraver in 1914, at the outbreak of World War I, he and his brother Bill joined the First AIF. He served with the 1st Field Ambulance from 1915 to 1919 in theatres as far apart as Gallipoli and Pozières.

He joined Smith's Weekly in 1928 as staff cartoonist and after the death of Cecil Hartt in 1930, illustrated its Unofficial History of the AIF pages with similar joke drawings of the Australian "digger". He was in turn succeeded by Lance Mattinson. While at Smith's, he made a notable caricature of the staff artists "Seeing's Believing – Smith's Artists On Parade 30 July 1932"

Frank was also a talented painter in oils, despite his being colour-blind – his sons would help him distinguish red from green.

== Selected works ==
At National Library of Australia:

Portrait of Bert Hinkler
Parade at the Base (cartoon)

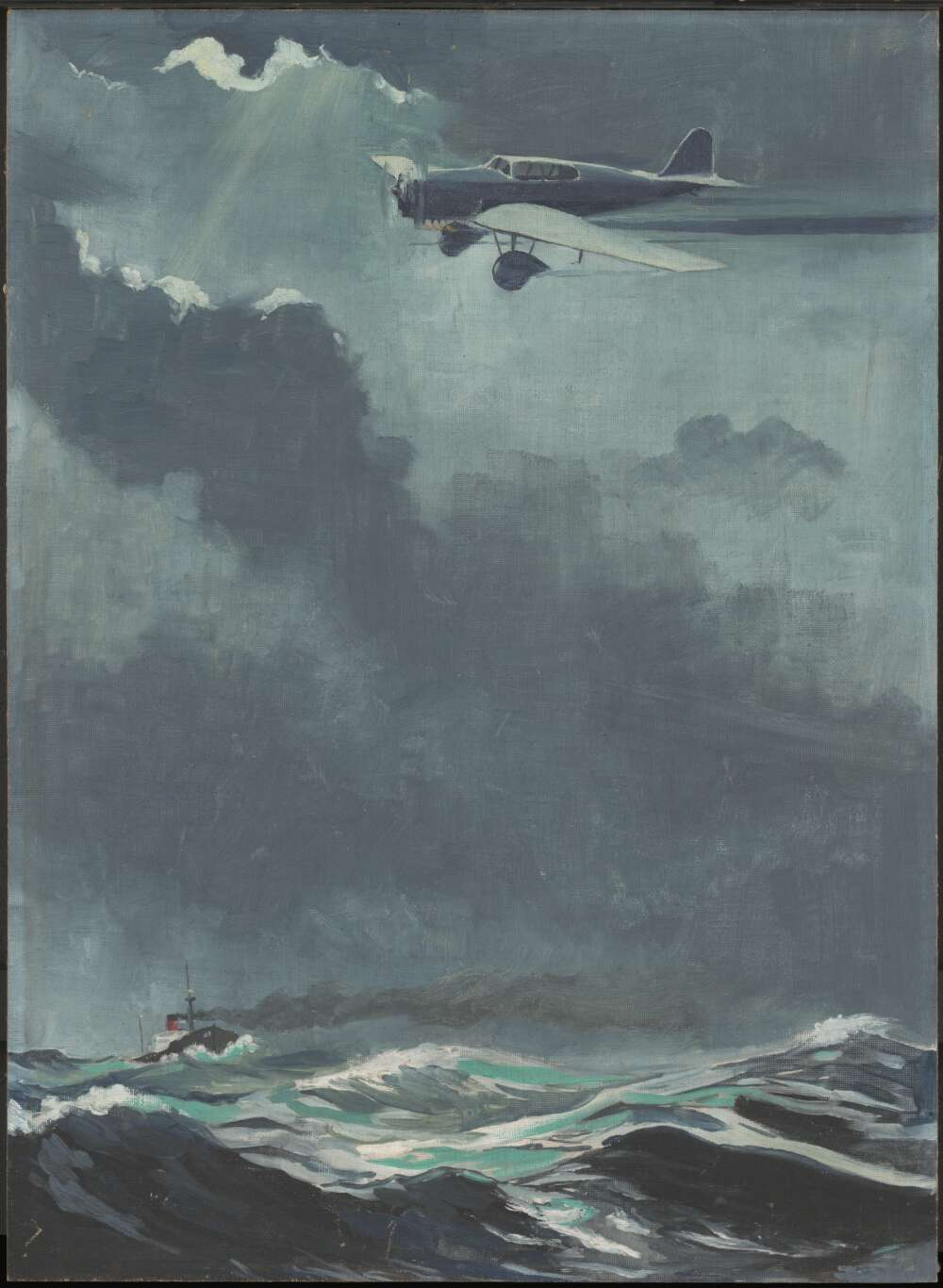
Seascape showing Melrose's Percival Gull, by Frank Dunne, circa 1930s

Seascape showing Melrose's Percival Gull (painting)
Banaher's Mate(1937 painting )

The Australian War Memorial also shows samples of his work.

== Publications ==
Backless Betty from Bondi - poems by Kenneth Slessor (illustrations) pub. Angus and Robertson ISBN 0-207-14494-X
