= Harry Julius =

Australian cartoonist and commercial artist

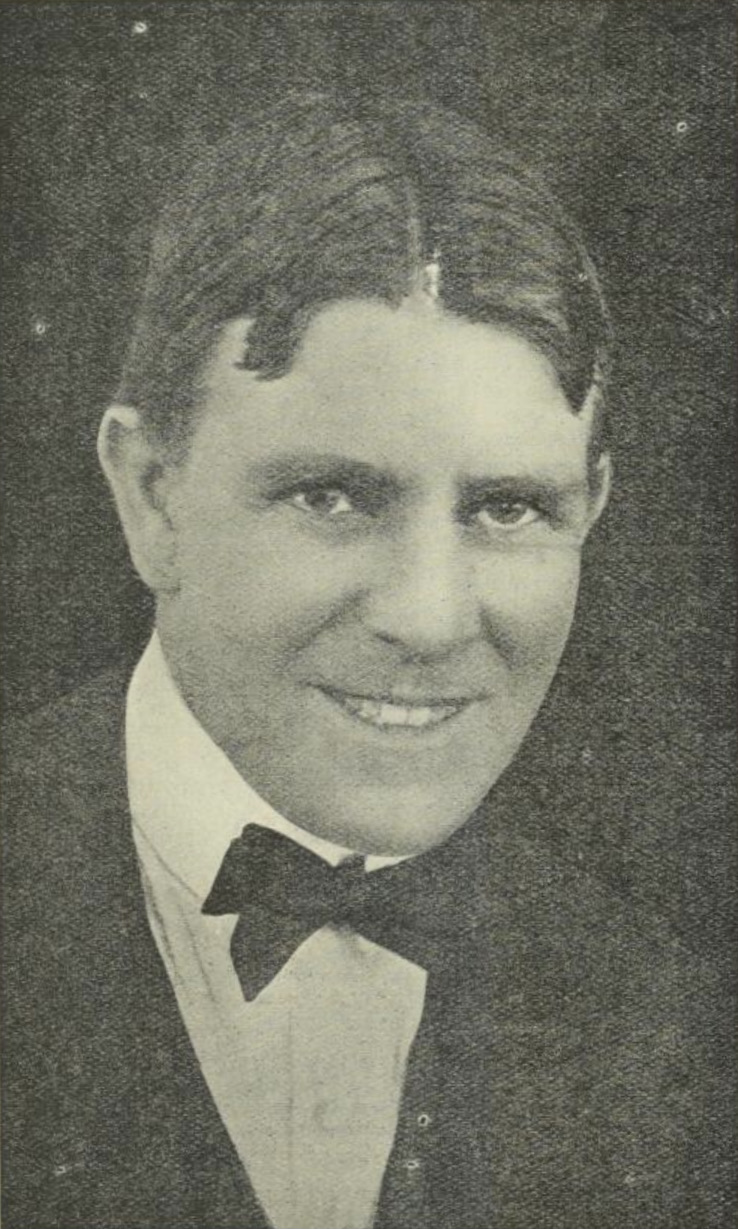
Harry Julius in 1916

Henry George "Harry" Julius (15 November 1885 – 29 June 1938) was an Australian commercial artist who had a long association with Sydney Ure Smith.

== History ==
Julius was born in Sydney. While quite young he enlisted with volunteers and served in the Boer War as a bugler, reputedly the youngest to serve overseas.

He learned the techniques of art at the Julian Ashton Art School, where he met Sydney Ure Smith, and together founded the advertising firm of Smith and Julius, which employed around 40 commercial artists, including Percy Leason, Lloyd Rees and Roland Wakelin. He assisted Ure Smith and Bertram Stevens to found the periodical Art in Australia and with Ure Smith produced The Home magazine, which was later taken over by the Sydney Morning Herald. He introduced colour to the traditional Sunday comic strips section of Australian newspapers. Smith and Julius merged with Catts Patterson in 1928, and Julius formed his own Harry Julius Advertising Service.

His caricatures appeared regularly in the Sydney Evening News and The Bulletin. He was the first Australian artist to successfully produce animated cartoons, which were shown in Sydney cinemas during the war years. His company Cartoon Filmads produced animated advertisements in the 1910s and 1920s.

He was a member of the Sydney Savage Club. He was a noted watercolorist, and shortly before his death was exhibiting at the David Jones Gallery.

He died at his Darling Point home following a heart attack. His remains were ashed at the Rookwood Crematorium.

== Family ==
Julius married and had two children: Rex and Ruth. The latter was well known as a painter and printmaker.

They had a home, "Tarmouth", Marathon Avenue, Darling Point.

He had three brothers: Frederick Julius and Clarence Julius, both in Sydney, and George Harond Julius (died 1948) in Brisbane. He had a sister, Mrs. W. T. Bull, also in Brisbane.
