= Joe Jonsson =

Australian cartoonist

Nils Josef Jonsson (originally Jönsson) (13 December 1890 – 19 March 1963) was an Australian cartoonist born in Halmstad, Sweden.

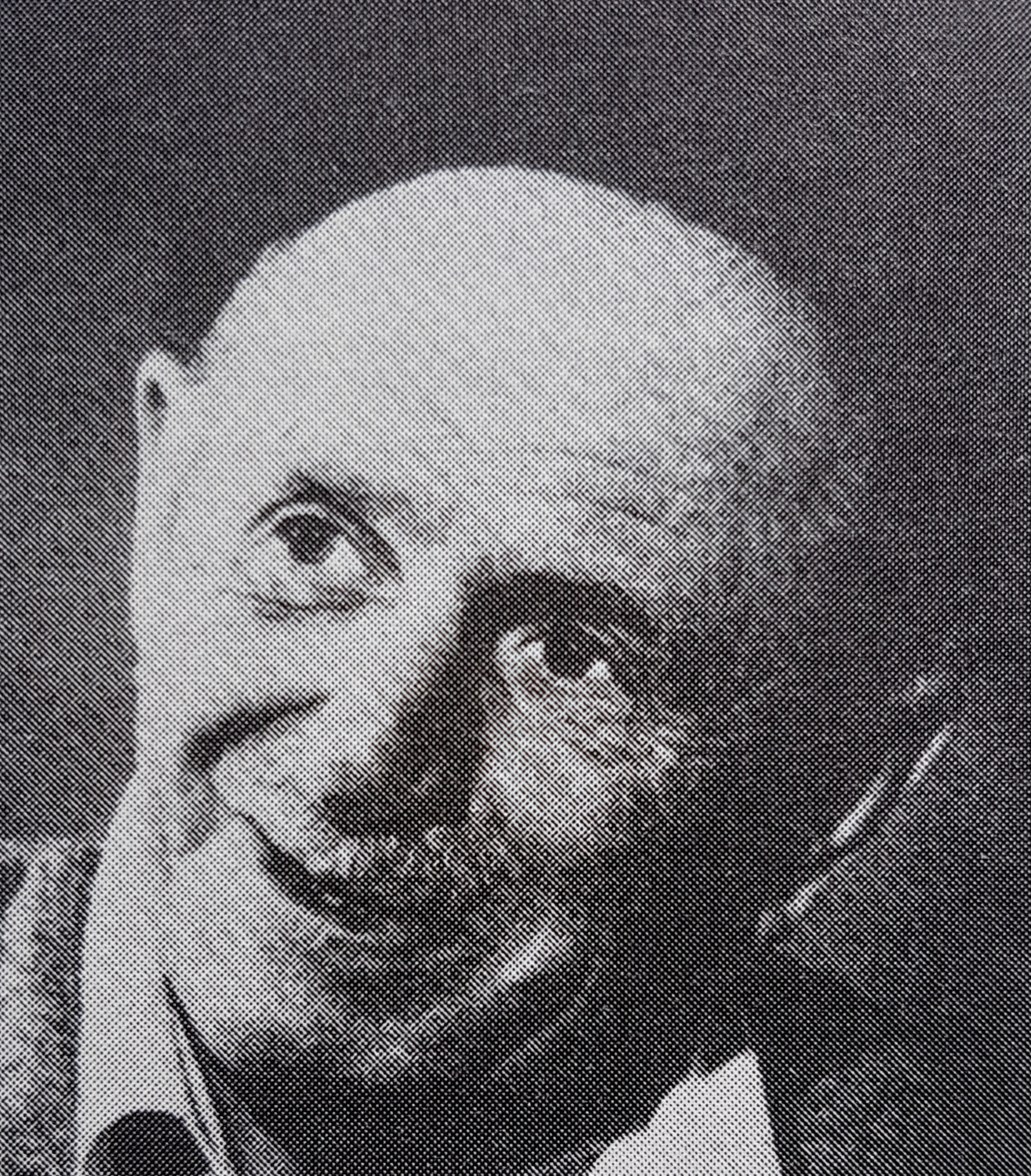
Josef Jonsson

At age 18 he went to sea for nine years, painting in his spare time. In 1915 he "jumped ship" in New Zealand where he worked for a while, then in Australia, finally settling down in Sydney where he studied painting full-time from 1918 to 1920 at the studio of John S. Watkins (1866–1942), becoming an instructor himself within a year. He worked as cartoonist with Smith's Weekly from 1924 to 1950 when it closed; the last artist still on staff. His jokes mostly centered on horses, ships and drunks.

Though he produced many gag panels for Smith's Weekly, his most popular work was "Uncle Joe and his Horse Radish", a coloured strip which first appeared January 1951 in Keith Murdoch's Sunday Herald, later Sun-Herald and was carried by other News Limited papers including Adelaide's Sunday Mail. It revolved around the splay-footed racehorse and its owners Joe (Swedish like himself) and his wife Gladys, children Oigle and Doigle, their jockey cousin Manfred and different racecourse characters: gamblers, drunks, bookies, nobblers, touts, society belles and so on.

Joe was a physically imposing and energetic individual known for having a photographic memory and a sharp sense of humour. He also possessed a high capacity for alcohol consumption and was noted to have enjoyed using the "Great Australian Adjective", "bloody", but it always came out pronounced "bletty". When he was called by Sir John Longstaff "the finest black-and-white artist Australia has produced", Joe's riposte was "Fancy that. And me a bletty Swede too!"

He was a foundation member of the Society of Australian Black and White Artists.

He married Agnes Mary McIntyre in 1927. He died of cardiovascular disease in Sydney in 1963, and was survived by his wife, a son and a daughter.
