= Emile Mercier (cartoonist) =

Australian cartoonist (1901–1981)

- Born: 10 August 1901; Nouméa, New Caledonia, France
- Died: 17 March 1981 (aged 79); Sydney, Australia
- Occupations: Printmaker, cartoonist, illustrator, translator
- Writing career
- Period: 1923–1981

Emile Mercier (10 August 1901 – 17 March 1981) was an Australian cartoonist, best known for his iconic cartoons regularly published in the Sydney Sun newspaper from 1949 to 1968, and which have been collected and published in 11 books.

== Biography ==
Mercier was born in Nouméa, New Caledonia on 10 August 1901, the son of a French baker. He came to Australia in 1919 and took a clerical position with a commercial house doing translations during the day and spending the evenings taking classes at the Julian Ashton Art School. In the early 1920s following the sale of one of his drawings to a Sydney newspaper he quit his job to make a living from drawing. Constrained by his limited command of English and unable to sell further drawings Mercier took a variety of jobs, including office boy, working on coastal ships, a spruiker at the Royal Easter Show, acting in stage melodramas. From the 1920s to 1940 he worked as a freelance artist selling cartoons and illustrations to Melbourne Punch, Smith's Weekly, The Bulletin and other smaller publications. In 1940 he obtained regular freelance work with Truth and The Daily Mirror. He created two comic strips for Truth, News Splashes and Week Spots. In 1941 Pen Pushers commenced in the ABC Weekly and soon after he linked up with Frank Johnson Publications.

In 1949 Mercier was employed as a cartoonist on a full-time basis with Sydney's The Sun newspaper, a position he held until his retirement in 1968.

Mercier's work was aimed squarely at the lower-middle class Australian reader. His daily single-panel newspaper cartoons were often topical, and mildly satirical. His humour took a neutral stance in politics, preferring to poke fun at politicians in general, rather than any recognisable figure. Generally, Mercier encouraged his readers to laugh at the vicissitudes of daily life. Some of his regular targets included drunks and tramps, fads and fashions in dress or house design, horse-racing, golf, food prices and motoring, all of interest to 1950s Australians.

Mercier enjoyed including strange words in his cartoons, like 'ETAOIN' and 'SHRDLU'; nonsense words formed by the first two rows of keys on the old Linotype machines; words which sometimes – to Mercier's amusement – were accidentally included in real-life newspaper articles. 'CMFWYP', the third line of keys on the keyboard, was sometimes used by Mercier as the name of a fictitious politician; the Honorable C. M. FWYP. Mercier also found the word 'GRAVY' humorous and included it a variety of contexts, including a trio of racehorses who were named 'GRAVY BONES', 'GREY SHRDLU' and 'KURLAMO' on signs above their stalls. Other Mercier's whims were depicting buildings, footpaths on floors supported by bed-springs, eccentric three-wheeled automobiles, yaks, and portraits of 'Uncle Ezra' on the walls of rooms.

There was also a cast of frequently recurring secondary characters who starred in background gags of their own, including a bearded old gentleman (occasionally referred to as "Argylle"), who wore pince-nez glasses, a striped blazer and either a deerstalker hat or a straw boater – and who sometimes appeared carrying a euphonium, driving one of the above-mentioned three-wheeled cars, or, more often, on stilts; and a seedy old drunk in a battered brass fireman's helmet. Mercier even occasionally appeared as himself in his own cartoons, usually in a self-deprecating role.

Mercier also had a naughty 'Gallic' sense of humour, and would often include double meanings in his jokes. His cartoon 'My wife's swallowed a bishop!' shows a woman who appears to have accidentally ingested a chess-piece, but the allusion is to fellatio. In another, a crow is showing another crow several golf-balls among the eggs in her nest, complaining that '... my husband has a detestable habit of leaving his balls lying all over the place!' (I'm Waiting For an Earthquake, p. 52)

While on the staff of Smith's Weekly, Mercier contributed a cartoon which included a cat in the foreground. Mercier added a cross under the cat's tail, representing its anus. The Smith's Weekly art editor rejected the cartoon and gave Mercier an angry lecture about including 'smutty gimmicks' in his work. Mercier then drew a down-drawn holland blind under the cat's tail, which hid the cat's anus but emphasised its presence, and re-submitted the cartoon.

Mercier retired from The Sun in 1968 and died on 17 March 1981 in Sydney from Parkinson's disease.

Cartoon comic-book characters invented by Mercier include:

- Tripalong Hoppity (a parody of Hopalong Cassidy);
- Wocko the Beaut;
- Supa Dupa Man (a parody of Superman);
- Mudrake the Magician (a parody of Mandrake the Magician);
- Speed Umplestoop (a parody of Flash Gordon);
- Three Gun Ferdie (a cowboy who carries an extra gun in his chest....);
- Yes, What? (a popular radio comedy show of the 1940s);
- Doc McSwiggle.

Emile Mercier's works make up part of the storyline of Australian pop fiction author, Robert G Barrett's book, Les Norton and the Case of the Talking Pie Crust.

Mercier illustrated the Mark Vizzers novel She'll do Me! as well as several collections of yarns by Australian folklorist Keith Garvey.

== Works by Emile Mercier ==
Mercier's newspaper cartoons were published in numerous collections:

- Wake Me Up At Nine! (Angus & Robertson, 1950)
- Sauce or Mustard? (1951)
- Gravy Pie (Angus and Robertson, 1953)
- Hang On Please! (Angus and Robertson, 1954)
- My Ears Are Killing Me! (Angus and Robertson, 1955)
- I'm Waiting for an Earthquake! (Angus and Robertson, 1956)
- Follow That Wardrobe! (Angus and Robertson, 1957)
- My Wife's Swallowed a Bishop! (Angus and Robertson, n.d. circa 1958)
- Is My Slip Showing? (Angus and Robertson, 1959)
- Hold It! (Angus and Robertson, 1960)
- Don't Shove! (1961)
- Emile Mercier's Australia: An outstanding collection from the best of Emile Mercier's drawings (Project Publications, no date).

Other works by Emile Mercier:

- Pippy. Sydney : Frank Johnson Publications, [1944]
- Osker. Frank Johnson Publications, [1944]
- Tibby Tims. Sydney : Frank Johnson Publications, [1944]
- The New Big Hit Comics. Frank Johnson Publications, [194?]
- Mudrake and the Plotters of Skroomania. Frank Johnson Publications, 1945
- Krazy Kracks. Guest writer, George Blaikie. Frank Johnson Publications, 1941
- Supa Dupa Man : the Big Curl. Frank Johnson Publications, [1945]
- Tripalong Hoppity the Fearless Texas Ranger. Frank Johnson Publications, 1945
- Wocko the Beaut and the Smugglers of Bindie Eye Bay. Frank Johnson Publications, [194-?]

== Bibliography ==
- Blaikie, George. Remember Smith's Weekly? A Biography of An Uninhibited National Australian Newspaper, 1919 to 1950. Rigby: Adelaide, 1966. ISBN 0-85179-767-9
- Lindesay, Vane. The Inked-in Image A Social and Historical Survey of Australian Comic Art. Hutchinson, Australia, 1980. ISBN 0-09-135461-7
- Garvey, Keith. The funny bugger and other tales: Humour and drama in an earlier Australia. Illustrated by Emile Mercier. Hutchinson of Australia, circa 1978.
- Garvey, Keith. Shout for the adder and other bush yarns. Illustrated by Emile Mercier. Hutchinson of Australia, 1980
