= Smith's Weekly =

Australian tabloid newspaper

- Type: Weekly newspaper
- Format: Tabloid
- Founder(s): Sir James Joynton Smith, Claude McKay and Clyde Packer
- Founded: 1919; 107 years ago
- Ceased publication: 28 October 1950
- City: Sydney
- Country: Australia

First page of the first issue of Smith's Weekly, March 1919

Smith's Weekly was an Australian tabloid newspaper published from 1919 to 1950. It was an independent weekly published in Sydney, but read all over Australia.

== History ==
The publication took its name from its founder and chief financer Sir James Joynton Smith, a prominent Sydney figure during World War One, conducting fund-raising and recruitment drives. Its two other founders were theatrical publicist Claude McKay and journalist Clyde Packer, father of Sir Frank Packer and grandfather of media baron Kerry Packer.

Mainly directed at the male (especially ex-Servicemen) market, it mixed sensationalism, satire and controversial opinions with sporting and finance news. It also included short stories, and many cartoons and caricatures as a main feature of its lively format.

One of its chief attractions in the 1920s was the Unofficial History of the A.I.F. feature, whose cartoons and contributions from returned soldiers helped perpetuate the image of the "digger" as an easy-going individual with a healthy disrespect for authority. It also worked hard to ensure that promises made to soldiers during hostilities were not swept aside in peacetime. Of particular concern was men affected by shellshock, a condition which was being minimised by some "experts" as deserving scorn rather than sympathy. Staff cartoonists associated with this feature included the succession of Cecil Hartt, Frank Dunne and Lance Mattinson.

From 1922 the Smith's Weekly offices were at 126-130 Phillip Street.

It also had a special Investigation department staffed by journalists with a bent for sleuthing. One of its many exposures is credited with dealing a fatal blow to the New Guard, an incipient fascist movement of the 1930s.

One of Smith's Weekly's innovations was, in conjunction with Union Theatres Ltd., the first "Miss Australia" beauty contest, selected from winners from each State. Prizes included a trip to America with £500 spending money, a screen test and paid speaking engagements. Winners were:

- 1926: Beryl Mills of Geraldton, Western Australia; she married journalist Frank Davison of Smith's Weekly, her escort on the World Tour.
- 1927: Phyllis von Alwyn of Launceston, Tasmania. The company which promised a motor car as part of the prize never delivered. The winner of the "Miss New South Wales" heat was controversially changed at the last moment.

The contest was then quietly dropped, but re-instituted in 1936 with much broader selection criteria, in which beauty was not mentioned. The judging panel was composed entirely of prominent women; the winner was Sheila Martin of Wagga Wagga. The prize for "Miss Australia 1937" was a trip to London to attend the coronation of Edward VIII on 12 May 1937 (which instead became the coronation of George VI) followed by a tour of Canada and the United States.

Smith's Weekly staff included notable poet Kenneth Slessor as editor, and cartoonists of the stature of George Finey, Emile Mercier and Stan Cross. It was a launching pad for two generations of outstanding Australian journalists and cartoonists.

In the 1930s Dick Randall submitted articles for publication in Smith's Weekly, later becoming finance editor. In 1966, as Sir Richard Randall, he became Secretary to the Treasury, Canberra.

Three rare Lovecraftian stories were originally published by the well-known "Witch of the Cross" in Sydney, Rosaleen Norton in Smith's Weekly. They were later reprinted as, Three Macabre Tales (US: Typographeum Press, 1996).

== Decline and closure ==
On 5 April 1932, Francis Barnby Wilkinson and his girlfriend Dorothy Ruth Denzel, were victims of a callous double murder at Moorebank by William Cyril Moxley. In the issue dated 30 July 1932, Smith's Weekly published a barrage of ugly allegations against Wilkinson, including attempted extortion and being a police informant. They were quickly proven false, a fact that was seized on by the daily newspapers. Smith's Weekly never fully recovered from its loss of reputation.

Its fortunes revived somewhat during World War II, once again doggedly supporting the men at the front, but at war's end rising costs and lack of capital (new owners seeing its value as real estate rather than a business) accelerated its decline, and the last issue, dated 28 October 1950, was a tabloid of a mere 24 pages.

== Noteworthy employees ==
Editors-in-Chief

- Claude McKay 1919–1927
- Frank Marien 1928–1936
- Harry Cox 1938–1939
- Kenneth Slessor June–September 1939
- Claude McKay 1939–1950

Editors

- Reg Moses 1930–1935
- Kenneth Slessor 1935–1939
- George Goddard 1939–1947
- Edgar Holt 1947–1950

Artists

- Stan Cross – employed from March 1919, the second artist employed by Smith's Weekly.
- Les Dixon
- George Donaldson
- Lance ('Driff') Driffield
- Frank Dunne
- John Endean
- George Finey
- Charles Hallett
- Cec Hartt – employed from the first edition in March 1919 to his death in 1930; the first artist employed by Smith's Weekly.
- Mollie Horseman
- Eric Jolliffe
- Joe Jonsson
- Alex King
- Joseph Lynch
- Lance Mattinson
- Emile Mercier
- Syd Miller
- Norm Mitchell
- Joan Morrison
- 'Petrov' (Geoffrey Claude Turton)
- Jim Phillips – Walkley awards 1960, 1962.
- Virgil Reilly – began to contribute during 1924, probably becoming a staff artist from about January 1925; he left Smith's in about January 1938 to work for Consolidated Press (publisher of The Daily Telegraph and The Australian Women's Weekly).
- Jim Russell
- Alek Sass (born Alexander Phillip Williams; known as Alek or Alec Sass) – employed from March 1919, the third artist employed by Smith's Weekly, and its first art editor. Alek Sass died on 1 December 1922.

Crime reporters

- Vince Kelly, who also wrote: Guarded Pearls (1948); The Shadow – Australia's underworld cop (1954) – about Frank Fahy; The Bogey Man – the exploits of Sergeant C J Chuck, Australia's most unpopular cop (1956); Rugged Angel – the amazing career of policewoman Lillian Armfield (1961, 1995? ISBN 0-646-23680-6); The Shark-arm Case (1963, 1975 ISBN 0-207-13212-7); The Charge is Murder (1965).
- Harry Maddison

Writers and reporters

- Bartlett Adamson
- George Blaikie 1931–1950
- Clem Cleveson
- Dorothy Drain (journalist and poet)
- Reg Harris (later press secretary to several Federal Ministers)
- Bernard Hesling
- Errol Knox (later Sir Errol of The (Melbourne) Argus)
- Henry Lawson
- Lennie Lower
- Ronald McCuaig
- Alex MacDonald (previously scriptwriter for "Mo" Roy Rene)
- Adam McKay (literary editor)
- Reg Moses ("Mo") (satirist) 1920–1935
- John O'Donnell
- John Quinn (poet) 1945–1947
- Dick Randall (finance editor) 1930s (later Sir Richard Randall)
- Helen Seager
- Colin Simpson (author, journalist and traveller)
- Kenneth Slessor
- Rupert Tribe (motoring journalist, also wrote short stories)
- Gus Walker

Sports writers

- Jim Donald (boxing)
- Tom Foley (racing)
- Cliff Graves (racing)

Advertising

- Ernie Brewer
- Hugh Dash (later press secretary to Prime Minister Menzies)
- William Gasnier (later father of Rugby League star Reg Gasnier)

== Digitisation ==
Smith's Weekly has been digitised as part of the Australian Newspapers Digitisation Program of the National Library of Australia.

== See also ==
- List of newspapers in New South Wales
