= James Joynton Smith =

Australian politician

The Honourable Sir James Joynton Smith KBE, JP
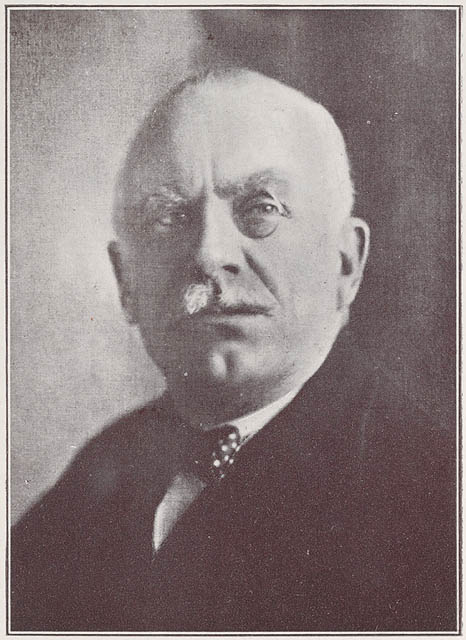

48th Lord Mayor of Sydney
- In office 1 January 1918 – 31 December 1918
- Preceded by: Richard Meagher
- Succeeded by: John English

Alderman of the Sydney City Council
- In office 1 December 1915 – 30 November 1918
- Constituency: Bligh Ward

Member of the Legislative Council of New South Wales
- In office 23 July 1912 – 22 April 1934
- Nominated by: James McGowen
- Appointed by: Lord Chelmsford

Personal details
- Born: 4 October 1858 London, United Kingdom
- Died: 10 October 1943 (aged 85) Coogee, New South Wales, Australia
- Children: Jeffry Joynton-Smith

Sir James John Joynton Smith KBE, JP (4 October 1858 – 10 October 1943), commonly referred to simply as Joynton Smith, was an Australian hotelier, racecourse and newspaper owner, and Lord Mayor of Sydney.

== Early life ==
Born on 4 October 1858 as James Smith (he added the Joynton later) in Bishopsgate, London, Smith had only the use of one eye, and went to work as a cabin boy aged ten until 1874, when he settled in Wellington, New Zealand.

In 1884 he organised the Seamen's and Firemen's Union of Wellington, and was first president and secretary of the Cooks' and Pantrymen's Union of New Zealand. He went on to run the Prince of Wales Hotel, then the Post Office Hotel, marrying in 1882. However, according to his memoirs, he gambled away his fortune during a brief return to London in 1886.

== Entrepreneurship in Australia ==
Around 1890 he arrived in Sydney and in 1891 re-entered the hospitality industry, starting with the Grand Central Coffee Palace, a temperance hotel. In 1896 he took over lease of the Imperial Arcade Hotel in Pitt Street, renaming it the Arcadia and transforming it into a highly profitable residential hotel. He eventually acquired a string of hotels in Sydney and the Blue Mountains, including the Log Cabin in Penrith, the Imperial in Mount Victoria and the Carrington in Katoomba. The Carrington was notable for having its own power plant - its chimney can still be seen to this day - which also supplied electricity to parts of Katoomba. Earlier he had established the Imperial Arcade Electric Light Co, which later formed the nucleus of Sydney City Council's electricity system. In October 1913, it was reported that Smith had bought the Hydro Majestic in Medlow Bath for £60,000.

In 1901, Smith's interest in sports led to him taking out a lease at Brighton racecourse at Rockdale, and later the Forest Lodge racecourse in Glebe, which eventually became Harold Park. In 1908 he opened the Victoria Park racecourse at Zetland, turning it into a showplace for horse and pony racing and trotting.

== Political career ==
After failing in an attempt for the Legislative Assembly seat of Moruya in the 1901 election, Smith was appointed for life to the Legislative Council in 1912. He was never active in the upper house and retired when it was re-formed in 1934. Smith also served as president of the New South Wales Rugby Football League. From 1916 to 1918 he was an independent alderman of Sydney Municipal Council for Bligh Ward. He served as Lord Mayor of Sydney in 1918.

After losing his council seat in the 1918 elections, Smith helped Clyde Packer and Claude McKay to launch the newspaper Smith's Weekly (1919–50), for which he is perhaps best remembered, investing £20,000 in its formation. The tabloid, initially printed in the basement of the Imperial Arcade, was aimed squarely at supporting the rights and welfare of returned servicemen, with whom it proved popular. Knighted in 1920, chiefly for his work raising war bonds during World War I, Smith remained chairman of Smith's Newspapers until 1939 and was granted retention of the "Honourable" title in 1936 for his long service in the Legislative Council.

== Personal life and other activities ==
From 1912 Smith lived at Hastings House, in Baden Street, Coogee, which was the former residence of Sydney mayor in 1867, Charles Moore).

Unusually for a man whose fortune was largely built on hotels, he was a teetotaller. He was a keen billiards player and played against John Roberts during a visit by Roberts in 1910 at Smith's Arcadia Hotel in Sydney.

Noted for generous support of patriotic and hospital charities, he was instrumental in the establishment of Royal South Sydney Hospital. He was a director of Sydney Hospital (1911–1932), Royal Prince Alfred Hospital (1911–1932), the Wentworth Falls Convalescent Home, and was first president of the Picton Lakes T.B Soldiers and Sailors' Settlement at Thirlmere.

He was also involved in the development of professional rugby league football in its early years, having put up the money to back the breakaway code in Australia.

== Later life, death and legacy ==
On 10 December 1943 he died at his residence and was cremated at Northern Suburbs Crematorium the following day. He was survived by his third wife and a daughter and a son (his eldest child, Thayre, died in 1938, aged 31).

His estate, valued at £326,000, was the subject of a long and expensive litigation.

His son Jeffry Joynton-Smith AM (1925-1991) was general manager of the Australian Elizabethan Theatre Trust from 1969 until 1984, and in a 1980 interview spoke about the influence of his father's business activities on him at an early age.

Joynton Ave in Zetland, New South Wales and Joynton Smith Drive in Canberra were named for him.

== Sources ==
- Blaikie, George (1967). Remember Smith's Weekly?. London: Angus & Robertson.
- Smith, Joynton (Sir) (1927). My life story. Sydney: Cornstalk Publishing.

Civic offices
Preceded by Richard Meagher	Lord Mayor of Sydney; 1918	Succeeded by John English
