= The Sun (Sydney) =

Afternoon tabloid newspaper

- Front page of The Sun, 4 July 1910
- Type: Daily afternoon newspaper
- Format: Tabloid
- Publisher: John Fairfax Holdings
- Founded: 1910
- Ceased publication: 1988
- Sister newspapers: The Sydney Morning Herald
- ISSN: 2205-9830

The Sun was an Australian afternoon tabloid newspaper, first published in Sydney under that name in 1910.

== History ==
The Sunday Sun was first published on 5 April 1903.

In 1910 Hugh Denison founded Sun Newspaper Ltd (later Sun Newspapers Ltd) and took over publication of the old and ailing Australian Star and its sister Sunday Sun, appointing Monty Grover as editor-in-chief. The Star became The Sun, and the Sunday Sun became The Sun: Sunday edition on 11 December 1910. According to the claim below the masthead of that issue, it had a "circulation larger than that of any other Sunday paper in Australia".

Denison sold the business in 1925. In November 1929 Associated Newspapers Ltd was formed by merging Sun Newspapers Ltd and S. Bennett Ltd, publishers of The Evening News. Sun Newspapers Ltd and S. Bennett Ltd were de-listed on the Stock Exchange and replaced with Associated Newspapers Ltd. Associated Newspapers Ltd then took over Smith's Weekly and its subsidiaries the Daily Guardian and Sunday Guardian.

In 1953, The Sun was acquired from Associated Newspapers by Fairfax Holdings in Sydney, Australia, as the afternoon companion to The Sydney Morning Herald. At the same time, the former Sunday edition, the Sunday Sun, was discontinued and merged with the Sunday Herald into the tabloid Sun-Herald.

Publication of The Sun ceased on 14 March 1988. Some of its content, and sponsorship of the Sydney City to Surf footrace, was continued in The Sun-Herald.

== Digitisation ==
Some issues of the paper have been digitised as part of the Australian Newspapers Digitisation Program of the National Library of Australia.

== See also ==
- GIO Building
- List of newspapers in Australia
- List of newspapers in New South Wales
