= Stanley Award =

Annual cartoonist award

The Stanley Awards, also known as The Stanleys, are an annual comics award issued by the Australian Cartoonists' Association which recognize the best of Australian cartoonists and cartooning. They are named after Stan Cross and were first organized in November 1985.

The Silver Stanley award is now known as the Jim Russell Award and is awarded to a cartoonist for services to the cartooning industry.

== Winners ==
- Gold Stanley

Awarded to the 'Cartoonist of the Year' (currently sponsored by The Herald Sun) and the past winners are:

Year	Cartoonist
1985	Alan Moir
1986	John Spooner
1987	Bill Leak
1988	Bill Leak
1989	Bill Leak
1990	Suzanne White
1991	Bill Leak
1992	Bill Leak
1993	Eric Lobbecke
1994	Bill Leak
1995	Bill Leak
1996	Bill Leak
1997	Brett Lethbridge
1998	Brett Lethbridge
1999	Joanne Brooker
2000	Sturt Krygsman
2001	James Kemsley
2002	David Rowe
2003	Rolf Heimann
2004	George Haddon
2005	Peter Broelman
2006	Mark Knight
2007	David Rowe
2008	David Rowe
2009	Peter Broelman
2010	David Pope
2011	Anton Emdin
2012	David Pope
2013	Anton Emdin
2014	David Rowe
2015	David Rowe
2016	Glen Le Lievre
2017	David Rowe
2018	David Rowe
2019	David Rowe
2020	David Rowe
2021	Cathy Wilcox
2022	David Pope
2023	David Rowe
2024	David Rowe
2025	David Rowe

- Jim Russell Award

Formerly the Silver Stanley for Contribution to Australian Black & White Art, this award is made to the individual or organization who in the opinion of the ACA Board has made a significant contribution to Australian cartooning; and the past winners are:

Year	Cartoonist
1985	Jim Russell
1986	The Bulletin
1987	John Thorby
1988	Vane Lindesay
1989	State Library of New South Wales
1990	James Kemsley
1991	Dan Russell
1992	Lindsay Foyle
1993	John Champion/Rotary Club of Coffs Harbour City
1993	John Champion
1994	Les Dixon
1995	Cole Buchanan
1996	Tony Rafty
1997	LJ Hooker
1998	Jeff Hook
1999	Roger Fletcher
2000	Jenny Hughes
2001	Bruce Petty
2003	William 'Weg' Green
2004	Monty Wedd
2005	Allan 'Sols' Salisbury
2006	Paul Rigby
2007	Michael Atchison
2008	Jim Bridges
2009	Norman 'Heth' Hetherington
2010	Steve Panozzo
2011	Rolf Heimann
2012	Talking Pictures
2013	Russ Radcliffe
2014	Media, Entertainment and Arts Alliance
2015	For Gorsake, Stop Laughing, This is Serious!
2016	Gerald Carr
2017	Gary Chaloner
2018	National Cartoon Gallery
2019	Behind the Lines
2020	Jules Faber
2021	Kaz Cooke
2022	Fiona Katauskas
2023	Peter Broelman
2024	Nat Karmichael
2025	George Haddon

- Comic Strip

Awarded to the 'Comic Strip Artist of the Year' (currently sponsored by The Daily Telegraph) and the past winners are:

Year	Comic Artist
1985	Gary Clark
1986	Ken Emerson
1987	Bill Mitchell
1988	Bill Mitchell
1989	Brian Kogler
1990	James Kemsley
1991	Brian Kogler
1992	Brian Kogler
1993	Brian Kogler
1994	Gary Clark
1995	Gary Clark
1996	Gary Clark
1997	Gary Clark
1998	Gary Clark
1999	Gary Clark
2000	Tony Lopes
2001	Tony Lopes
2002	Gary Clark
2003	Sean Leahy
2004	James Kemsley
2005	Tony Lopes
2006	Tony Lopes
2007	Tony Lopes
2008	Tony Lopes
2009	Gary Clark
2010	Tony Lopes
2011	Tony Lopes
2012	Gary Clark
2013	Gary Clark
2014	Tony Lopes
2015	Gary Clark
2016	Gary Clark
2017	Gary Clark
2018	Peter Player
2019	Tony Lopes
2020	Tony Lopes
2021	Tony Lopes
2022	Tony Lopes
2023	Gary Clark
2024	Ian Jones
2025	Tony Lopes

- Single Gag

Awarded to the 'Single Gag Cartoonist of the Year' (currently sponsored by The Courier Mail) and the past winners are:

Year	Cartoonist
1985	Eric Jolliffe
1986	Eric Jolliffe
1987	Matthew Martin
1988	Matthew Martin
1989	Brian Kogler
1990	Brian Kogler
1991	Brian Kogler
1992	Brian Kogler
1993	Mark Knight
1994	Cathy Wilcox
1995	Kerry Millard
1996	Glen Le Lievre
1997	Cathy Wilcox
1998	Pat Campbell
1999	Kerry Millard
2000	Mark Lynch
2001	Matt Golding
2002	Tony Lopes
2003	Dean Alston
2004	Pat Campbell
2005	Matt Golding
2006	Matt Golding
2007	Matt Golding
2008	Matt Golding
2009	Matt Golding
2010	Matt Golding
2011	Andrew Weldon
2012	Dean Alston
2013	Glen Le Lievre
2014	Cathy Wilcox
2015	Cathy Wilcox
2016	Matt Golding
2017	Peter Player
2018	Peter Player
2019	Peter Player
2020	Matt Golding
2021	Peter Player
2022	Andrew Weldon
2023	Andrew Weldon
2024	Judy Horacek
2025	Megan Herbert

- Illustrator - sponsored by Viscopy: David Pope
- Graphic Media Artist - sponsored by Newmatilda.com: David Follett
- Caricaturist - sponsored by The Australian: David Rowe
- Political/Editorial Cartoonist - sponsored by The Sydney Morning Herald: Cathy Wilcox
