= David Pope (cartoonist) =

Australian cartoonist (born 1965)

- Born: 1965 (age 60–61)
- Known for: Editorial/political cartoons
- Awards: See this article's Awards section
- Website: Scratch! Media, Canberra Times gallery

David Pope (born 1965) is an Australian cartoonist, who has served as the daily editorial cartoonist for The Canberra Times since March 2008.

== Early life and education ==
David Pope was born in 1965. The Pope family moved to Canberra when David was 7 years old. He lived in the Belconnen suburb of Macgregor, and attended the schools Ginninderra High School in Holt and then Copland College in Melba. He briefly attended university at the Australian National University in Canberra, and later enrolled in Labour Studies at the University of Adelaide.

Pope describes himself as being "sidetracked into the peace movement, the punk movement and community radio" during the 1980s. This included time associated with Canberra's 2XX FM, and the union movement.

== Freelance cartoonist ==
David Pope began drawing cartoons for various Australian publications in the mid-1980s. This included publications associated with the labour movement, environmental movement and other alternative press periodicals.

An early publisher was The University of Adelaide's Labour Studies Briefing, which used Pope's cartoons to illustrate the academic research into labour policy that was being summarised by the digest. Other publishers included Common Cause, The Metalworker, The Socialist, Socialist Worker, Green Left Weekly, Frontline, Chain Reaction, The Republican, The Northern Rivers Echo, The Diplomat, The New Doctor, Overland, and Arena. Pope formed the publication business Scratch! Media to publish and distribute his work.

Before his permanent job with The Canberra Times, Pope was published by that newspaper's Sunday Times during the early 2000s. Pope was later the editorial political cartoonist for Sydney's The Sun-Herald during the mid 2000s.

David Pope's cartoons were published under the pen name of Heinrich Hinze throughout his freelance career, including his early years freelancing for The Canberra Times. This was a name Pope had originally used whilst a member of a punk band in the 1980s. Pope decided to begin publishing under his own name upon being permanently employed by The Canberra Times in 2008.

== The Canberra Times ==
David Pope had been freelancing for The Canberra Times for years, during the 2000s. He became the newspaper's editorial cartoonist in March 2008 following the resignation of Geoff Pryor, who had occupied that role for 30 years. Pope remains in this role as of 2015.

== Influences, style and themes ==
David Pope cites Australian cartoonists Michael Leunig, Bruce Petty and Geoff Pryor as influences, particularly for the political sensibilities at the core of their cartoons.

Judy Horacek wrote about David Pope: "his cartoons fight for the small and the weak against the powerful and corrupt". Horacek notes that as well as caricaturing public figures such as politicians, Pope's cartoons frequently feature "a collection of Everypersons - wide-eyed ordinary people who are battling and baffled".

== Awards and recognition ==
As of 2022, Pope has received 15 Stanley Awards as voted by his peers in the Australian Cartoonists' Association. This includes the Gold Stanley for overall Australian Cartoonist of the Year in 2010, 2012, 2015 and 2022 as well as other Stanley Awards for Editorial/Political Cartoonist (2002, 2011, 2012, 2014 and 2022), Humorous Illustrator (2001, 2003, 2004 and 2005), and Illustrator (2020 and 2022).

Pope won the Walkley Award for cartoon of the year in 2015 ("He Drew First"), 2022 ("Rollout de Vax") and 2025 ("Gaza").

Pope has also won four Ranan Lurie Political Cartoon Awards from the United Nations Correspondents Association, and the Cartoonist of the Year by the Museum of Australian Democracy in 2012 and 2022.

In 2015, Pope drew a cartoon titled "He Drew First" in response to the Charlie Hebdo shooting, which quickly found 'viral' international fame. A signed print of this cartoon, was presented to Charlie Hebdo magazine by Australian Foreign Minister Julie Bishop as an official gift in April 2015. The cartoon has been described as "arguably one of the most viewed Australian cartoons ever produced", due to the internationally-relevant topic of the cartoon, and its rapid spread through social media.

== Personal life ==
As of 2015, David Pope lives in Canberra with his partner. He has three children.
