= Australian Cartoonists' Association =

Australian professional cartoonists' organisation

The Australian Cartoonists' Association (ACA) is the Australian professional cartoonists' organisation and was established on 17 July 1924 as the Society of Australian Black and White Artists. It was the first association of newspaper artists in the world.

It soon became The Black and White Artists Society; and, by 1938, its name had been changed to The Black and White Artists Club. By 1939, it had a sketching division and an etching division.

In 2024, a collection of artworks were put on display in the exhibit "A Century of Satire" at State Library of New South Wales to celebrate 100 years since the Black & White Artists Club began.

== First clubrooms ==
The Association's first clubrooms were at 250 George Street, Sydney.

== Founding members ==
Founding members were Reg Russom, Unk White, George Finey, Syd Nicholls, Jack Quayle, John Wiseman, Jack Baird, Joe Jonsson, Cyril Samuels, Frank Jessop, Brodie Mack, Mick Paul, Harry J Weston, Jack Waring, Syd Miller, Arthur Mailey, F H Cumberworth, Fred Knowles and Cecil Hartt, who was elected president.

== Other notable members ==
- Jules Faber (elected president 2009)
- Alex Gurney

== Hall of Fame ==
- Jimmy Bancks (1889–1952) – creator of Ginger Meggs
- Stanley Cross (1888–1977) – creator of The Potts and Wally and the Major
- Will Dyson (1880–1938) – political cartoonist (Bulletin, Melbourne Punch, Daily Herald)
- Ken Emerson (1927–2010) – creator of On The Rocks and The Warrumbunglers
- George Finey (1895–1987) – cartoonist (Smith's Weekly)
- May Gibbs (1877–1969) – author and illustrator
- Alex Gurney (1902–1955) – creator of Bluey and Curley
- Jeff Hook (1928–2018) – editorial cartoonist for the Hobart Mercury, Herald Sun
- Eric Jolliffe (1907–2001) – creator of Witchetty's Tribe and Saltbush Bill
- Percy Leason (1889–1959) – early political cartoonist (Bulletin, Melbourne Punch)
- Vane Lindesay (1920–) – cartoonist, author and cartoon historian
- Norman Lindsay (1879–1969) – acclaimed artist, sculptor and cartoonist
- David Low (1891–1963) – political cartoonist and caricaturist
- Phil May (1864–1903) – caricaturist
- Emile Mercier (1901–1981) – editorial cartoonist for The Mirror
- Pat Oliphant (1935– ) – 1967 Pulitzer Prize winner
- Bruce Petty (1929–2023) – political cartoonist and animator
- Ron Tandberg (1943–2018) – editorial cartoonist for The Age
- Monty Wedd OAM (1921–2012) – creator of Captain Justice, Ned Kelly and Ben Hall comic strips

== ACA presidents ==
1924–1980

Term	President
1924–39	Cecil Hartt
1931–54	Stan Cross
1955–57	Jim Russell
1958–64	Doug Albion (acting for Jim Russell)
1965–73	Jim Russell
1974	Doug Albion
1975	Tony Rafty
1976	Max Ariev
1977	Dan Russell
1978	Jim Swanson
1979	Ian Cox
1980	Arthur Hudson

1981–2000

Term	President
1981	Ton Rafty
1982	Ian Cox
1983	Max Foley
1984–87	John Thorby
1988–90	James Kemsley
1991	Mark David
1992–93	Steve Panozzo
1994–96	Lindsay Foyle
1997–99	Steve Panozzo
1999–2000 (April)	Pierre de Dassel
2000	Lindsay Foyle

Term	President
2000–03 (May)	Rod Emmerson
2003–06	James Kemsley
2006–08	Peter Broelman
2008–10	Jules Faber
2010–12	Jason Chatfield
2012–2020	Jules Faber
2020–present	Cathy Wilcox

== Stanley Awards ==
The Stanley Awards are issued annually by the Australian Cartoonists' Association and recognise the best of Australian cartoonists and cartooning.

=== Gold Stanley Award ===
The ACA's ultimate credit to a cartoonist is the Gold Stanley Award (named after Australian cartoonist Stan Cross, who was a longtime president of the ACA).

Previous recipients of the award are:

1985–1999

Year	Awardee
1985	Alan Moir
1986	John Spooner
1987	Bill Leak
1988	Bill Leak
1989	Bill Leak
1990	Suzanne White
1991	Bill Leak
1992	Bill Leak
1993	Eric Löbbecke
1994	Bill Leak
1995	Bill Leak
1996	Bill Leak
1997	Brett Lethbridge
1998	Brett Lethbridge
1999	Joanne Brooker

2000–2009

Year	Awardee
2000	Sturt Krygsman
2001	James Kemsley
2002	David Rowe
2003	Rolf Heimann
2004	George Haddon
2005	Peter Broelman
2006	Mark Knight
2007	David Rowe
2008	David Rowe
2009	Peter Broelman

Year	Awardee
2010	David Pope
2011	Anton Emdin
2012	David Pope
2013	Anton Emdin
2014	David Rowe
2015	David Pope

=== Jim Russell Award ===
The Jim Russell Award, formerly the Silver Stanley Award, (named after Australian cartoonist Jim Russell), given to individuals or organisations who, in the opinion of the ACA Board, has made a significant contribution to Australian cartooning.

Previous recipients of the award are:

1985–1999

Year	Awardee
1985	Jim Russell
1986	The Bulletin
1987	John Thorby
1988	Vane Lindesay
1989	State Library of New South Wales
1990	James Kemsley
1991	Dan Russell
1992	Lindsay Foyle
1993	John Champion
1994	Les Dixon
1995	Cole Buchanan
1996	Tony Rafty
1997	L. J. Hooker
1998	Jeff Hook
1999	Roger Fletcher

2000–2009

Year	Awardee
2000	Jenny Hughes
2001	Bruce Petty
2002	No Award given
2003	William Ellis Green "Weg"
2004	Monty Wedd
2005	Allan Salisbury "Sols"
2006	Paul Rigby
2007	Michael Atchison
2008	Jim Bridges
2009	Norman Hetherington "Heth"

Year	Awardee
2010	Steve Panozzo
2011	Rolf Heimann
2012	Talking Pictures – Insiders (ABC TV)
2013	Russ Radcliffe
2014	Media, Entertainment and Arts Alliance (MEAA)
2015	Stan Cross’ original cartoon, “For gorsake, stop laughing: this is serious!”
