= Pat Campbell (cartoonist) =

Australian cartoonist

- Born: Canberra, Australia
- Known for: Cartoons
- Awards: See this article's Awards section
- Website: pat.net.au

Pat Campbell is an Australian cartoonist.

Born in Canberra, Campbell completed a Bachelor of Arts degree from the Australian National University in 1993. He subsequently began working casually as a freelance artist for The Canberra Times.

Campbell has worked full-time for The Canberra Times since 1998, as a cartoonist and illustrator.

In addition to this employment with The Canberra Times, Campbell continued to work as a freelance illustrator. His work has appeared in publications such as CHOICE magazine, Australian Macworld, Victorian Law Journal, as well as for institutions such as Questacon, the National Museum of Australia, and the Australian War Memorial.

== Awards and recognition ==
As of 2024, Campbell has won the Walkley Award for his editorial cartoons on two occasions: in 2013 for "Glimmer of Hope" about Julia Gillard's Prime Ministership, and in 2019 for "Silver Fern" about the Christchurch mosque shootings. As of 2024, he has won seven Stanley Awards as voted by his peers in the Australian Cartoonists' Association. This includes Stanley Awards for Single Gag (1998, 2004), Humorous Illustrator (2000, 2002), Illustrator (2014), Media Graphic Artist (2008), and Editorial/Political cartoonist (2019). Campbell has also won the Australian Cartoonists' Association's Bill Mitchell Award for Young Cartoonists (1992), and a Rotary Cartoon Award for best political cartoon (2010)
