= Roger Fletcher =

Roger Fletcher may refer to:

- Roger Fletcher (cartoonist)
- Roger Fletcher (mathematician)
