= David Rowe (cartoonist) =

Australian cartoonist

David Alexander Rowe is an Australian editorial cartoonist for the Australian Financial Review.

He grew up in Canberra. Rowe's father worked in the Department of Foreign Affairs and his mother worked in the Prime Minister's Department. Rowe attended the Australian National University and initially studied economics, later studying art history and then political science, then studied graphic design at the TAFE in Reid, finally moving to Canberra Art School. Rowe worked for The Canberra Times as a cartoonist in the 1980s.

He regularly appears in the annual series Best Australian Political Cartoons. He is also represented in the National Museum of Australia's political cartoon inventory.

Rowe was the "Behind the Lines" Cartoonist of the Year in 2013 and in 2017. He won the Australian Cartoonists' Association's Gold Stanley eleven times, more than anybody else, including a run four consecutive years from 2017 to 2020 and again from 2023 to 2025. He won the Walkley Award for Cartoons four times: in 2009, 2011, 2016, 2020.

He also exhibited cartoons in Sydney in 2013.

In 2015 he published a volume titled Mindless Colouring 101.

== Publications ==
- Brasch, Nicolas; Rowe, David (2008). So You Want to Be Prime Minister?. Black Dog Books. ISBN 978-1-74203-022-7. Second edition (2013) ISBN 978-1-922179-25-8
- Hunter, Amy; Rowe, David (2009). Great Aussie Inventions (1st ed.). Black Dog Books. ISBN 978-1-74203-076-0. Second edition (2013) ISBN 978-1-922179-24-1
- Rowe, David (2019). Politics Now. Laura Tingle (introduction). Scribe. ISBN 978-1-925849-43-1.
