= Greenpeace Australia Pacific =

Regional office of Greenpeace

- Founded: 1977, Australia
- Type: Non-governmental organisation
- Purpose: Environment, peace
- Location: Sydney, Australia
- Region served: Australia, Pacific
- Method: Direct action, lobbying, research, innovation
- Key people: David Ritter Chief Executive Officer
- Website: www.greenpeace.org.au/

Greenpeace Australia Pacific (GPAP) is the regional office of the global environmental organisation Greenpeace. Greenpeace Australia Pacific is one of Australia's largest environmental organisations.

== Origins and formation ==
Greenpeace Australia had its roots in 1974 when Rolf Heimann skippered the 30-foot Tahiti ketch La Flor from Melbourne to Mururoa via New Zealand, to protest against French atmospheric nuclear testing, but arrived after the final nuclear test for the year.

The regional office emerged when an activist group, the Whale and Dolphin Coalition, invited Canadian Bob Hunter, Greenpeace co-founder and its first president, and his wife Bobbi, Greenpeace's first treasurer, to Australia in 1977.

Greenpeace's first direct action in Australia opened on 28 August 1977, at Albany, Western Australia, against Australia's last whaling station. Over the next three weeks, activists used Zodiacs to place themselves between the harpoons of the three whale chaser ships and sperm whales up to 30 miles offshore.

In early 1998 Greenpeace Australia and Greenpeace Pacific teamed up to become Greenpeace Australia Pacific (GPAP). The organisation currently maintains its headquarters in Sydney, but operates throughout Australia and the Pacific.

== Campaigns and operational activities ==
Greenpeace uses tactics of non-violent direct action and 'bearing witness' to draw attention to what it considers significant threats to the environment, and then lobbies for solutions.

Greenpeace describes itself as 'the leading independent campaigning organisation that uses peaceful protest and creative communication to expose global environmental problems and promote solutions that are essential to a green and peaceful future'.

The Australia Pacific division of the organisation has currently identified protecting forests and oceans, defending the Pacific Islands, ending the oil age, preserving the great barrier reef, creating a coal free future and conserving the Antarctic as its campaigning priorities.

=== The Great Australian Bight ===
In June 2017 Norwegian-based oil and gas explorer Statoil ASA became operator and 100% equity owner of two exploration permits of approximately 12,000 square kilometres in the Great Australian Bight. Greenpeace and members of the Great Australian Bight Alliance assert that the risk of a spill and presence of the industry in the region poses an unacceptable threat to the environment and livelihoods of local communities.

Campaign activities have centred around promoting South Australia's investments in renewable energy, raising awareness of the perceived risks and supporting grassroot opposition movements within the region.

=== Stop Adani ===
As part of their objective to create a coal-free future and protect the Great Barrier Reef, GPAP joined the Stop Adani movement. The campaign aims to halt Adani Group's proposed Carmichael coal mine project in the Galilee Basin in Queensland. The project includes plans to build 200 km of rail line and a new port terminal at Abbot Point. The campaign has focused on preventing the Adani Group from accessing the funding or resources it needs to open the Carmichael mine, building public momentum and applying pressure on politicians to oppose the project.

In December 2016 GPAP published the report 'Off Track: Why NAIF (Northern Australia Infrastructure Facility) can't approve the Carmichael Rail Project' which expressed concerns over NAIF independence and ability to approve a rail line loan while complying with organisational loan eligibility criteria. In late 2017, the Queensland government announced that it would veto any federal NAIF funding for a Galilee Basin rail line, effectively ending the prospect of NAIF subsidising Adani's rail proposal. In February 2018 rail company Aurizon withdrew its NAIF loan application. In July 2019, over 500 protesters gathered at the Brisbane Square with the aim to 'stop the city' demanding the state government to revoke the approval of the mine. The environmental approval for the mine came in June 2019.

=== The Commonwealth Bank Campaign ===
As part of its "creating a coal-free future" mission, GPAP ran a campaign against the Commonwealth Bank in March 2017.

The Commonwealth Bank funded more pollution from fossil fuel projects than any other Australian bank since the Paris Agreement was signed in 2015. GPAP's campaign aimed to get the Commonwealth Bank to stop financing new coal projects.

After putting a lot of pressure on the Commonwealth Bank through massive supporter mobilisations and actions around the country, the bank's chair Catherine Livingstone finally told shareholders in November 2017 that the Commonwealth Bank's exposure to coal would decline.

Prior to that, following immense public pressure, in August 2017, the Commonwealth Bank ruled out Adani's coal mine project in the Galilee Basin threatening the Great Barrier Reef.

=== Save The Great Barrier Reef ===
GPAP asserts Great Barrier Reef is under unprecedented threat from climate change. After the two severe coral bleaching in the Australian summer of 2016 and 2017, GPAP has strengthened its opposition to the expansion of the coal industry in Australia and advocated for a transition to renewable energy.

In 2011, after plans became publicly known, GPAP fronted efforts to expose the perceived risk that mining prospects in the Galilee Basin posed to reef health, and has campaigned on the issue since. Greenpeace's two reports – 'Boom goes the Reef' and 'Exporting climate change: killing the Reef' – publicly exposed the plans to open up the Galilee Basin to coal mining and analysed their consequences for the climate and the Great Barrier Reef.

In December 2017 GPAP collaborated with international artist Flume. A track set to a backdrop of image of bleached coral in the Great Barrier Reef was released.

== Funding and Resourcing ==
One of the fundamental principles of Greenpeace, and GPAP, is that funding is 100% financially independent from governments and corporations.

GPAP reported $26.43 Million (AUD) in revenue and $28.38 Million of expenses in 2023. This makes Greenpeace Australia Pacific one of Australia's largest environmental groups, declaring $215.4 Million in revenue over the last decade. GPAP also declared 85.9 full time equivalent Staff (FTE) and 300 volunteers.

According to disclosure through the ACNC, GPGAG source their funding from regular auto-giving donations (46%), new supporters (5%), major donations (25%), special appeals (6%) and bequests. GPAP spent $9 Million on fundraising appeals, generating $25M in proceeds.

An additional $722,000 in financial support was received from Greenpeace International in the 2020 financial year. GPAP reported a surplus in 2020 of $4,016,316 including the $1,090,500 received from the Australian Government's COVID-19 JobKeeper subsidy.
