= Global Haywire =

2006 documentary film

- Directed by: Bruce Petty
- Written by: Bruce Petty
- Produced by: Claude Gonzalez
- Narrated by: Tom Baker
- Cinematography: Michael Pearce
- Edited by: Sam Petty
- Music by: Elena Kats-Chernin
- Release date: 2006
- Running time: 82 minutes
- Country: Australia
- Language: English

Global Haywire is a 2006 documentary film directed by Bruce Petty. It discusses the state of the world, mixing animation and interviews to debate important issues of the time with a focus on the Middle East and Western colonialism It's built around the story of a plane with tensions building between passengers on each of its two decks.

== Reception ==
Variety's Russell Edwards writes "Reminiscent of the mechanical contraptions created by Petty’s New Yorker magazine predecessor, Rube Goldberg, the pic’s visually complex illustrations are an acquired taste and may overwhelm some auds. Nevertheless, they contain an essential simplicity and political directness that appealingly usurp the cluttered visual style." Radio National's Movietime reviewer Philippa Hawker calls it hard to categorise saying "It's an essay, an exploration, a narrative, an inquiry, a parable, and it's made out of almost every conceivable cinematic material: of animation, archival footage, talking heads, actors, artworks, photographs, voiceover narration, music, sound, archival audio -- sometimes, it seems, all of them at once, jostling for space in the frame and on the soundtrack."

Writing for the Sunday Age Tom Ryan gave it 4/5 saying it "is a witty, acerbic account - an "animated discussion" - of how we've managed to mess it all up." The Sydney Morning Herald's Richard Jinman gave it 3/5 and writes "Global Haywire is a polemic, albeit a very entertaining one. Conservatives are unlikely to be either amused or convinced by the arguments of a group of talking heads occupying a fairly narrow corner of the political playground." The Weekend Australian's Evan Williams gave it two stars ans says "It is a deeply serious, enormously ambitious work and it grieves me to say that I found it a great disappointment." Leigh Paatsch of the Herald Sun gave it one star and finishes "It is supposed to be funny, informative and scary in an obscure kind of way. But it feels just like a heap of homework handed out by an art teacher on the verge of a nervous breakdown."

== Awards ==
- 2007 Australian Film Institute Awards
  - Best Direction in a Documentary - Bruce Petty - won
  - Best Sound in a Documentary - Sam Petty - won
  - Best Documentary - Claude Gonzalez -nominated
  - Best Editing in a Documentary - Sam Petty - nominated
