= Human Contraptions =

2003 Australian animated television series

- Genre: Animated documentary
- Created by: Bruce Petty
- Voices of: Andrew Denton (narrator)
- Country of origin: Australia
- Original language: English
- No. of seasons: 1
- No. of episodes: 10

Production
- Producer: Deborah Szapiro
- Editor: 5 minutes
- Production company: Film Australia Limited

Original release
- Network: ABC TV
- Release: 2003

Human Contraptions is a 2003 Australian animated documentary television series created and animated by noted Australian cartoonist Bruce Petty. Made in 2002, the series aired for 10 episodes on ABC TV in 2003.

Episodes of Human Contraptions screened in competition at the 2003 Annecy International Animation Film Festival and at the 2003 Melbourne International Film Festival.
