= Dan Russell (cartoonist) =

Australian cartoonist

- Born: Daniel Russell; 12 June 1906; Millers Point, New South Wales, Australia
- Died: 1999 (aged 92–93); Orange, New South Wales
- Occupations: Cartoonist, illustrator
- Writing career
- Period: 1928–1991

Dan Russell (1906–1999) was an Australian cartoonist. Dan's younger brother Jim Russell was also a cartoonist.

== Biography ==
Russell was born in Millers Point, Sydney, Australia, the son of William John "Billy" Russell, a foreman plumber with the Sydney City Council, the president of the New South Wales Plumbers' Union, the national secretary of the Australian Plumbers and Gasfitters Employees Union, and unsuccessful Australian Labor Party candidate for the seats of Parkes and Canterbury, who was killed in a workplace accident in 1915. His mother Catherine Elizabeth (née Diggs), remarried in 1926 and was one of the first two-woman members of an Australian Upper House of Parliament.

Russell began his working life as a clerk but was soon studying art at night at the Julian Ashton Art School and at the art school of Wattie Watkins. From 1928 to 1929 he was the secretary of the Australian Black and White Artists' Guild and in 1937 became the treasurer of the reformed Australian Black and White Artists' Club. He worked in advertising and commercial art for a few years prior to World War II, until Frank Johnson Publications started producing comics, providing him with the opportunity to break into cartooning. At Frank Johnston he produced a number of comics, such as Terry Lawson (rover scout), Val Blake, Ventriloquist (roving adventurer and detective), Wanda Dare (lady reporter) and Jimmy Dale (a world boxing champion). After the war Russell travelled to the United States, Mexico and Canada to study cartoon techniques. Upon his return to Australia he joined the Allied Authors and Artists publishing group.

At the beginning of 1947, Dan and his younger brother, Jim, began their own publishing company, All-Australian Comics. The lead title of the company was Tex Morton's Wild West Comics, starring the popular country music singer. Like many Australian comics of the time, it was a copy of American material, in this case, featuring cowboy actors such as Roy Rogers and Gene Autry. Tex Morton was always featured in a lead-off story along with his mates Jacky, Shorty and Slim, drawn by Dan Russell. For the first two years companion features were Keith Chatto's Bunny Allen, Les Dixon's Alfie the Jackaroo and a series of bush yarns by Jack Hemming. Early in 1949 they added another title, Kanga's K.O. Comics. In the middle of 1950 All-Australian Comics ran into financial difficulties due to rising production costs and the company folded by the end of the year.

In 1952 Russell became a staff artist on The Truth and The Daily Mirror before becoming involved with AM Magazine. In 1953 Russell went to Adelaide joining The Advertiser as a political cartoonist. He switched to The News and Sunday Mail in 1955, where he served as an illustrator, sporting cartoonist and general humour cartoonist, until his retirement in 1970. During this time he created a number of comic strips, including Darky, the Kid from the Snowy River. Russell then returned to Sydney and worked freelance.

Russell was a lifelong member of the Australian Black and White Artists' Club and the president in 1977. He won a Silver Stanley for his contribution to black and white art in 1991 and was made a life member of the ABWAC the same year.

Dan Russell died in Orange, New South Wales in 1999 at the age of 93.
