= Torkan =

Torkan is a heroic fantasy comic strip written and illustrated by Roger Fletcher. The strip debuted in June 1976 in the Sunday Telegraph and has appeared continuously in the paper to the present day, with over seventy stories having been published.

During the early 1970s, Fletcher began developing a comic strip about an Australian soldier-of-fortune, titled Nathan Cole—until he was introduced to the world of sword and sorcery by science-fiction writer Fritz Leiber that would have a profound impact on his future. In particular, the pair of characters called Fafhrd and the Gray Mouser influenced Fletcher greatly.

Fletcher worked on a fantasy comic strip called Orn the Eagle Warrior in 1974, but the strip received no attention from publishers. Fletcher subsequently started drawing Torkan.

Torkan continues to win new generations of readers; something which Fletcher believes is attributable to the character's enduring appeal. Fletcher claims; "the paradigm for heroic adventure was first written in the Bible, as David and Goliath. Whether it's in Arthurian legend or Harry Potter, the paradigm itself doesn't change much - but fashions do change."

Levels of violence in the stories have dropped since the strip's early years.

Torkan has ended on 3 March 2019, with the last strip published in the Sunday Telegraph after 43 years of continuous publication. Refer to Page 21 of the TV Guide section of Sunday Telegraph where the last strip appeared
