= Leisure (film) =

- Directed by: Bruce Petty
- Produced by: Suzanne Baker
- Starring: Alexander Archdale
- Edited by: Peter Blaxland
- Music by: Michael Carlos
- Production company: Film Australia
- Release date: June 4, 1976
- Running time: 14 minutes
- Country: Australia
- Language: English

Leisure is a 1976 Australian animated short film directed by Bruce Petty. The film won the Academy Award for Best Animated Short Film at the 49th Academy Awards.

It is also one of the few Australian animated films to win such an honor (2003's Harvie Krumpet and 2010's The Lost Thing).
