= Wowser =

Australasian slang for a moralizer

"Wowser" is an Australian and New Zealand term that refers to someone who seeks to deprive others of allegedly immoral and sinful behaviour, such as drinking, smoking and gambling. Critics of wowsers typically describe them as prudish and self-righteous.

== History ==
The term originated in Australia, at first carrying a similar meaning to "lout" (an annoying or disruptive person, or even a prostitute). Around 1900 it shifted to its present meaning: one whose sense of morality drives them to deprive others of their sinful pleasures, especially liquor. The term was particularly applied to members of temperance groups such as the antipodean branches of the Woman's Christian Temperance Union.

John Norton, editor of the Australian scandal newspaper, Truth, claimed he first used the word in 1899, a claim supported by the OED. However some authors claim that the present meaning originated from an Australian temperance slogan, "We Only Want Social Evils Remedied." This apparent backronym is considered a "less credible provenance" by the ANU.

The Australian writer C. J. Dennis defined it thus: 'Wowser: an ineffably pious person who mistakes this world for a penitentiary and himself for a warder'.

Historian Stuart Macintyre argues:

the achievements of the wowsers were impressive; they passed laws that restricted obscenity and juvenile smoking, raised the age of consent, limited gambling, closed down many pubs, and in 1915–16 established a 6 pm closing hour for pubs, which lasted for decades.

== In popular culture ==
"Wowser" was frequently used by artist and author Norman Lindsay, who fought many battles with "wowsers" over the sexual content in his art and writing.

In The Motor magazine w/e 10 April 1940, the word was discussed, and the author of the "Contact" column was still bemused until he received a card from a gentleman in Bristol who said "Broadly speaking, 'wowsers' are pious hypocrites, those who dislike seeing others enjoy themselves, usually in evidence amongst the elder members of a community."

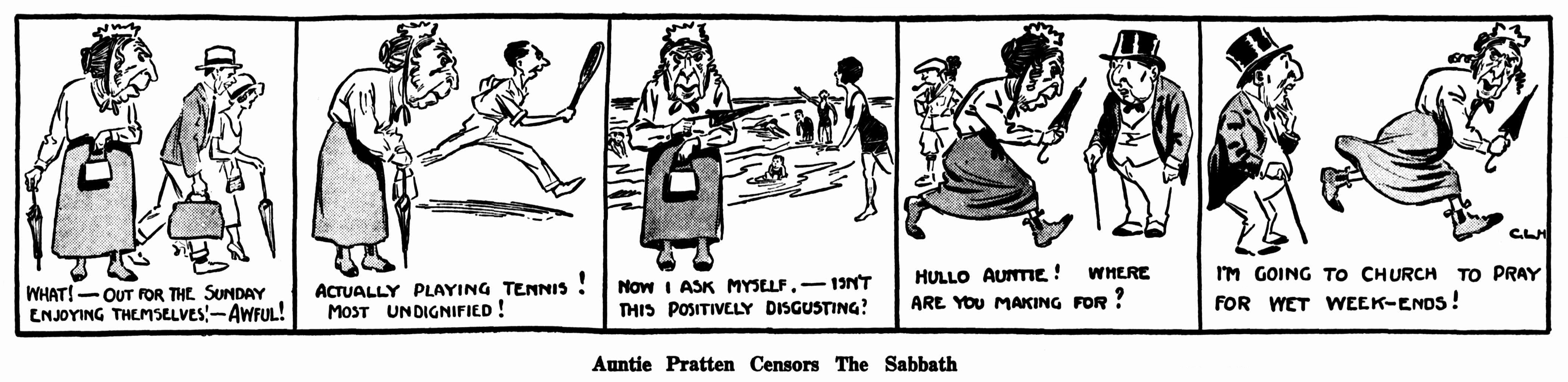
"Auntie Pratten Censors the Sabbath", cartoon by Cecil Hartt (published in Smith's Weekly, 14 February 1925), featuring caricatures of the Australian Prime Minister Stanley Bruce and a minister in his Government, Herbert Pratten (depicted as the wowserish 'Auntie Pratten')

== Other cultures ==
Americans rarely use the word, except as an interjection of surprise. However it appears several times in the works of H. L. Mencken:

"In the same way the Archidamian War is more interesting than the fiscal cares of the Four Hundred, and the craft of Pericles takes precedence of his abilities as tax-collector and wowser." (American Mercury "The Greeks")

In Ocean's Thirteen, Basher (Don Cheadle) says to Linus (Matt Damon), "You're such a wowser" when the latter refuses to buy certain types of magazines for him.

The term is also used a plural exclamation (e.g. "Wowsers!") by the title character of Inspector Gadget, voiced by Don Adams.

== See also ==
- Teetotaller
- Larrikinism
