= Cecil Hartt =

Australian artist

Cecil Lawrence Hartt
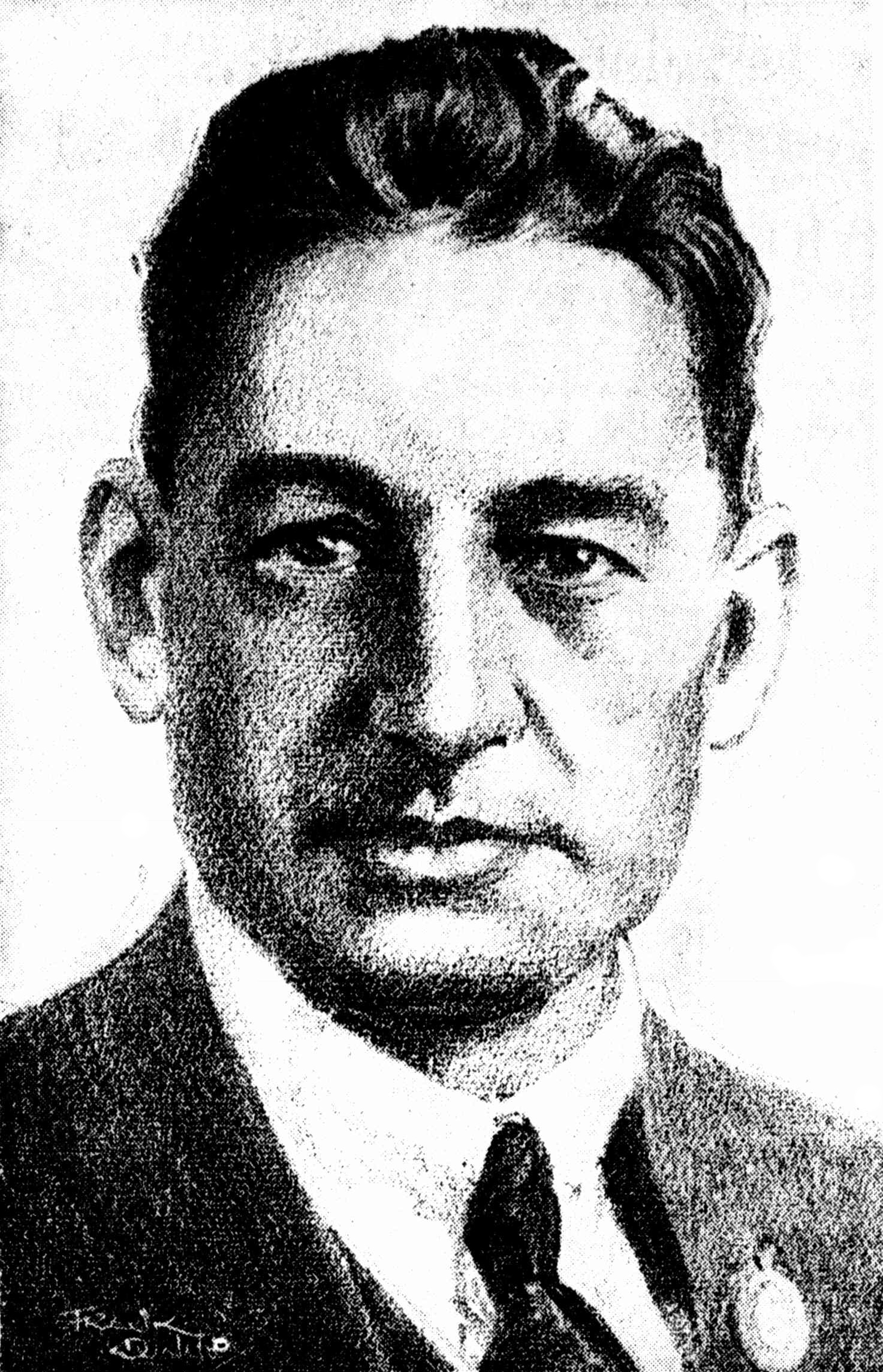
- Portrait of Cecil Hartt by Frank Dunne (published in Smith's Weekly, 31 May 1930).
- Born: Cyril Lawrence Hartt; 15 July 1884; Prahran, Victoria
- Died: c. 17 May 1930 (aged 45); Moruya, New South Wales
- Known for: Cartoons, illustrations

Signature
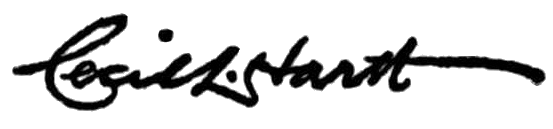

Cecil Lawrence Hartt (15 July 1884 – c. 17 May 1930) was an Australian cartoonist and caricaturist. As a wartime artist, he popularised the concept of the Australian digger as independent, easy-going and disrespectful of authority, with a sardonic attitude to life. He was the first artist to be employed by Smith's Weekly in 1919, continuing in that role until his death in 1930. Over his career Hartt produced a large number of cartoons on a broad range of subjects and themes; his drawings encompassed political, social and military topics and were admired for their observational humour and the quality of his character portraits. He mainly drew single-panel cartoons, but his body of work also includes early examples of Australian comic strips. Hartt was the first president of the Australian Black and White Artists' Club, formed in July 1924 (now the Australian Cartoonists' Association).

== Biography ==
=== Early life ===
Cecil Hartt was born Cyril Lawrence Hartt on 16 July 1884 at Prahran in inner suburban Melbourne, the son of James Hartt and Alice (née Lawrence), one of seven children in the family. His given name, Cyril, was soon abandoned and from an early age he was known as Cecil, or informally 'Cec'.

In about 1887, James Hartt took a job as a bookkeeper at Alfred Billson's Anglo-Australian Brewery at Beechworth, in north-east Victoria. In March 1897, Hartt resigned from his position "to seek to better his fortunes in Western Australia". By December 1897, James Hartt was living in Barrack-street in Perth.

By about 1901, the Hartt family had returned to north-east Victoria, living at Tallangatta near Albury-Wodonga, with James Hartt working as the head bookkeeper in Dyring and Dyring's general merchandise store. Cecil's mother died in January 1906 at Tallangatta after having "been in indifferent health for some time". In April 1906, Cecil's father left Tallangatta for Melbourne after Dyring's store changed hands. His father remarried in 1907.^{[A]}

=== A freelance artist ===
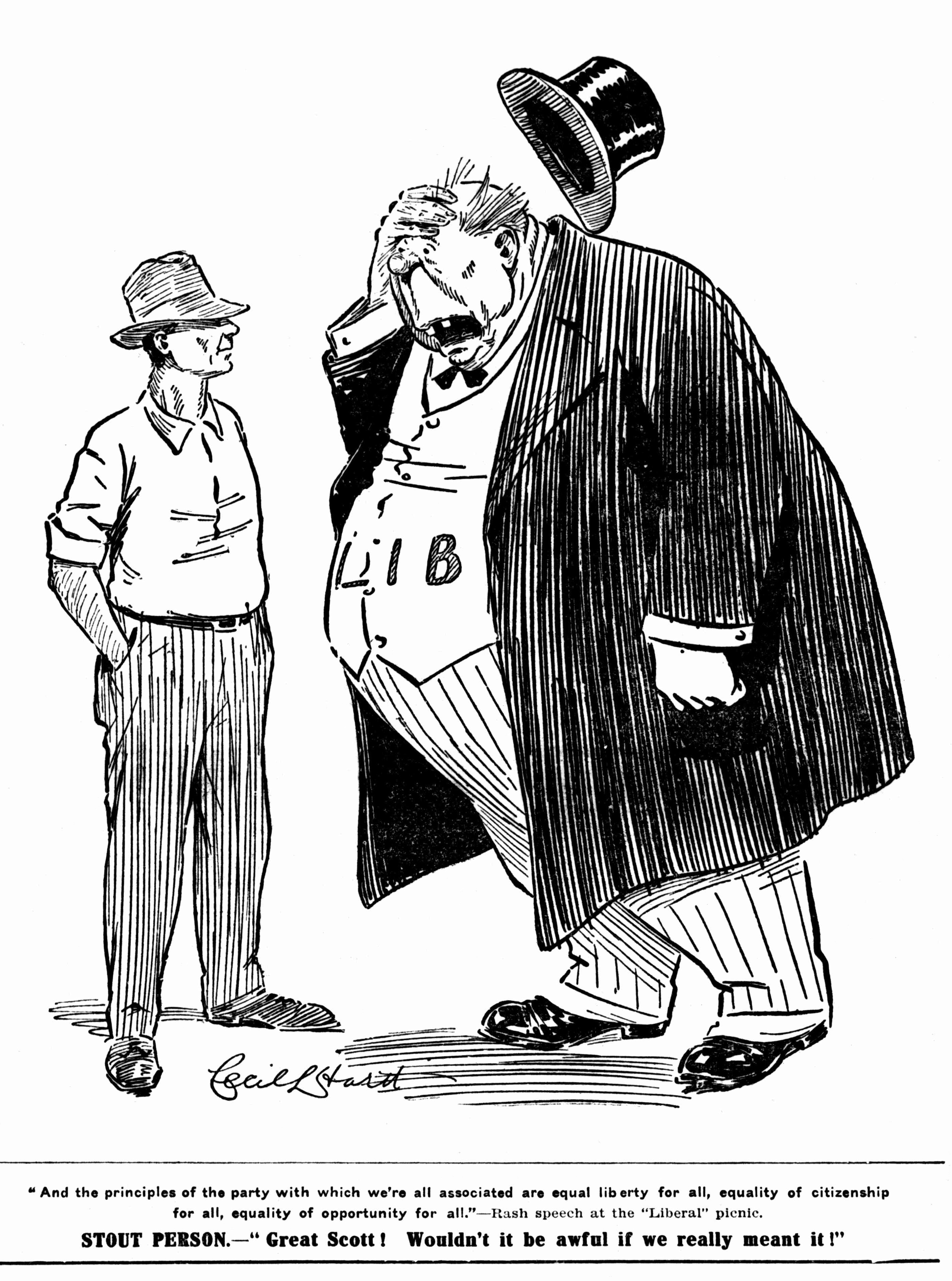
'Stout Person. – "Great Scott! Wouldn't it be awful if we really meant it!"' Political cartoon by Cecil Hartt, from The Worker, 21 August 1913.

By about 1907 Cecil Hartt was working as a clerk at the Yarra Bend Asylum, in the Melbourne suburb of Fairfield. In August 1907 a cartoon by Hartt was accepted and published in The Bulletin magazine. During this period, Hartt began taking instruction in drawing from Alex Sass, an older artist who was working as a cartoonist for Melbourne Punch. Hartt also studied art in Melbourne with the artist Harold Gye. In 1908, Hartt had a drawing published in Comments, a short-lived Melbourne journal. He also contributed to Randolph Bedford's mining and literary journal, The Clarion (at that time Melbourne's answer to The Bulletin).

Late in the morning on 3 June 1908, near Auburn railway station, James Hartt took his own life by placing his head on the rail as a train approached. The train-driver was alerted and applied the brakes, but was unable to stop in time. Hartt was decapitated; his remains were removed to the morgue where it was Cecil who had to identify his father's mutilated body. James Hartt had been living in Caulfield and had been unemployed for about nine weeks before his suicide.

In January 1909, Hartt relocated to Sydney. In July 1909 he married Ruby Manners in the Newcastle suburb of Hamilton and a son, named Lawrence, was born to the couple in March 1910. In 1911, Hartt was living in Walenore-avenue, Newtown. In January 1912, Hartt was elected as one of the two vice-presidents of the Australian Writers' and Artists' Union. He also served as a union delegate to the Labor Council. In 1913, Hartt was living in Hunter-street, Sydney, working as a freelance artist. During the period 1911 to 1913, he had cartoons accepted for the Sydney magazine The Comic Australian.

In about 1913, Hartt met Henry Lawson and the two became close friends. Hartt and Lawson had common connections with The Bulletin, The Australian Worker newspaper and the Australian Writers' and Artists' Union. They were a part of a wider social group of Sydney-based writers and artists, who often met for drinking sessions at pubs such as the Newcastle Hotel, at the corner of George and Essex streets, and the Assembly Hotel, at the corner of Hunter and Phillip streets.

From 1913 to early 1915, when he enlisted in the army, Hartt contributed political cartoons to The Worker newspaper and its successor, The Australian Worker. Hartt's cartoons were also being published in The Bulletin prior to and after his enlistment in March 1915. In 1915, Hartt was part of a group called the Newspaper Cartoonists' Association of New South Wales which published Sydneyites: As we see ’em 1913-14-15, a book of "representative citizens" of Sydney (all men), each image combining a drawing with a photograph of the subject's head. Hartt contributed nineteen drawings to the publication and was listed as being a cartoonist from The Bulletin.

=== Military service ===
Hartt's occupation was recorded as a cartoonist when he enlisted in the army, aged 30. His next of kin was recorded as his wife Ruby, living on Pittwater Road in Dee Why, a northern beach suburb of Sydney. Hartt enlisted at Liverpool in Sydney in March 1915, shortly after the outbreak of World War I and was placed in B Company of the 18th Battalion of the Australian Imperial Force. In June he embarked for overseas service.

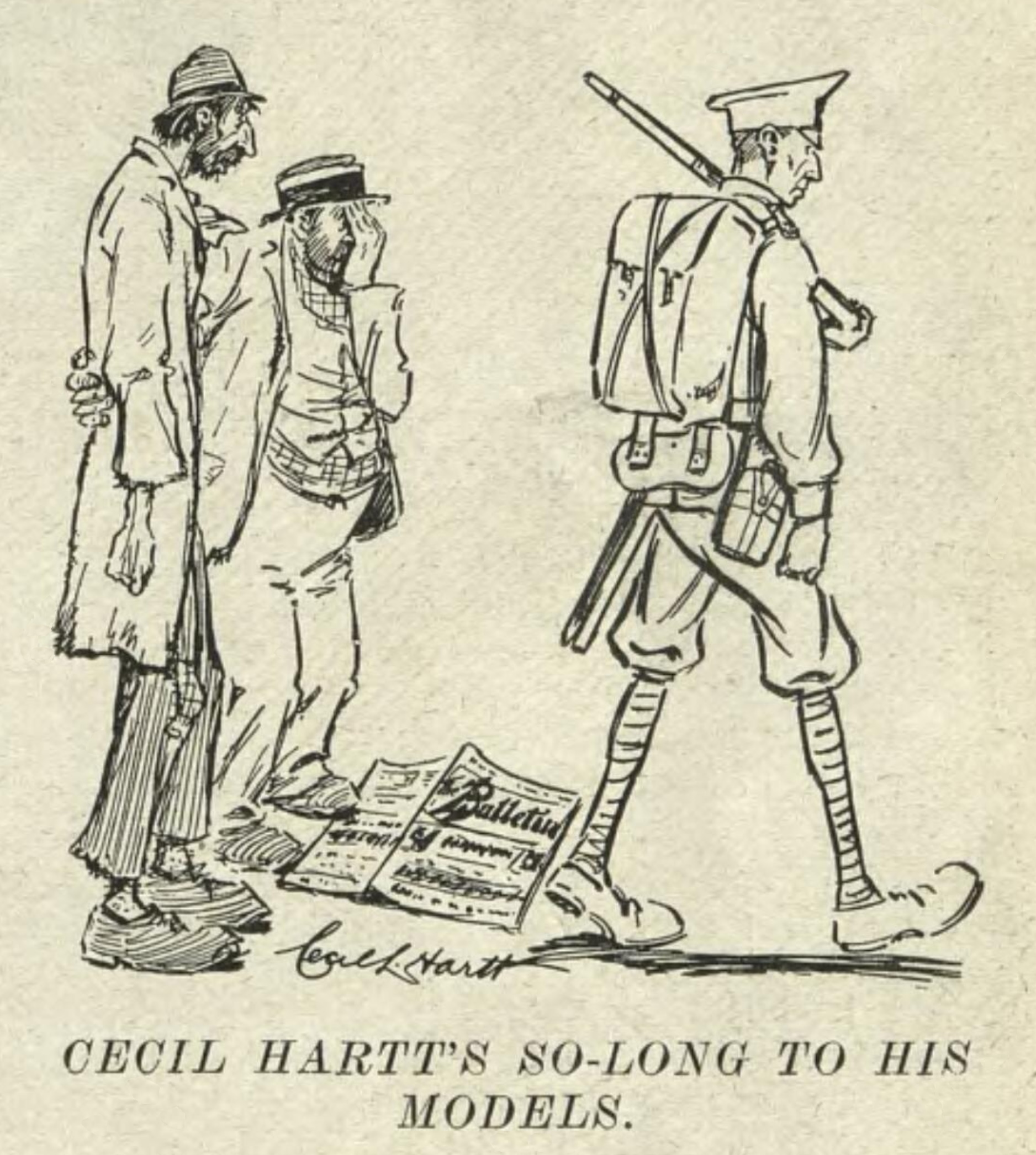
'Cecil Hartt's so-long to his models' (from The Bulletin, 3 June 1915).

The 18th Battalion AIF was sent to Gallipoli. On 27 August 1915, Hartt was wounded in left ankle by a machine-gun bullet during a disastrous charge from Chocolate Hill against Turkish forces on Hill 60. While he was crawling back to safety, Hartt was struck in the right thigh by shrapnel. He was evacuated to Mudros Harbour on Lemnos and then to Heliopolis near Cairo. Three weeks later, he was transferred to England and admitted to the Military Hospital in Reading.

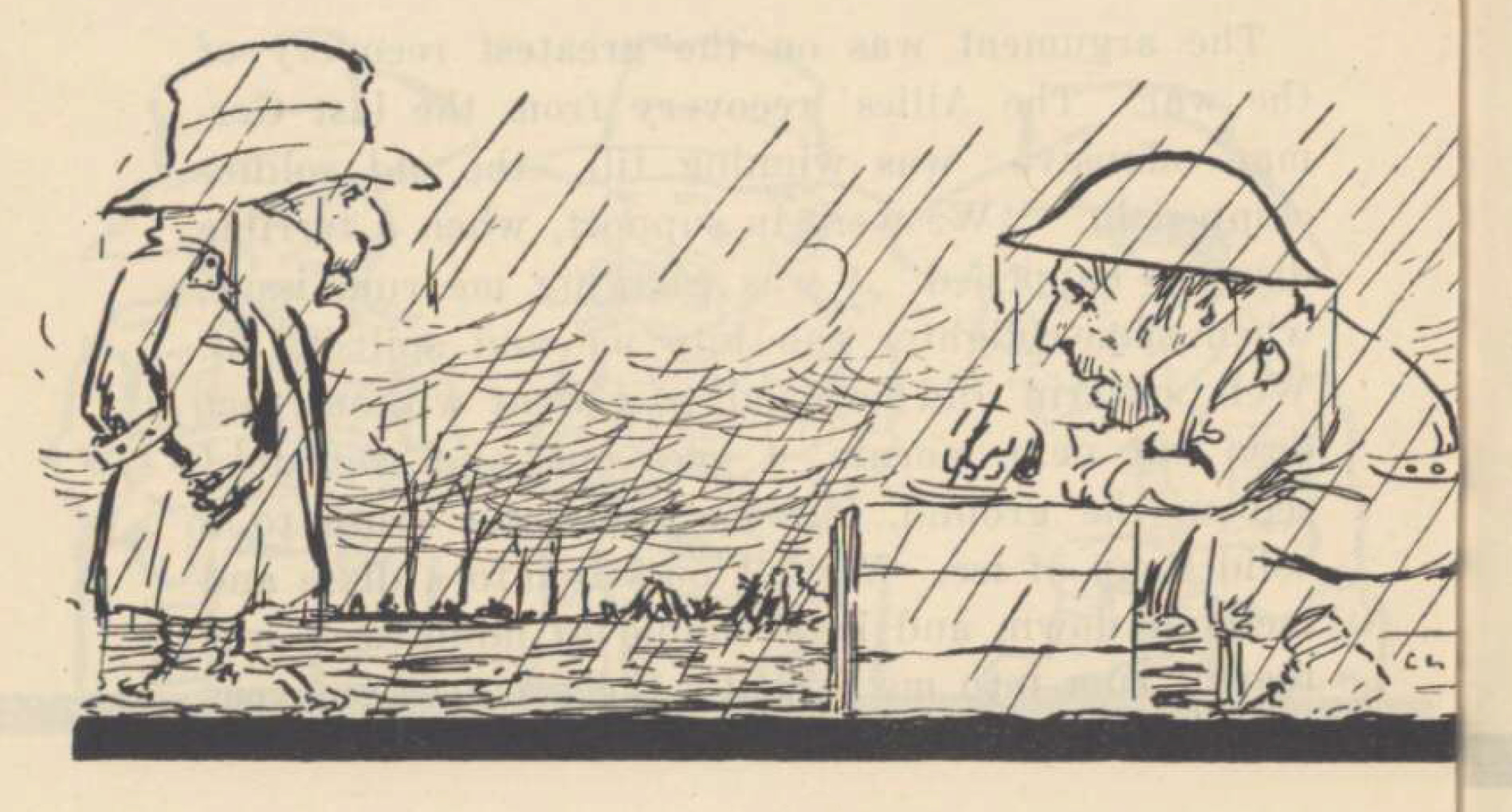
'Scene — Mud, slush, misery everywhere. Digger (writing letter on a bully beef box):— "'Ow do yer spell delightful, Bill?"' (from More Diggerettes, page 60, published in 1920).

Hartt was hospitalised for five months and his ankle wound left him with a permanent limp. In November 1915, he was taken off active service and placed on a supernumerary list of non-commissioned officers. Hartt remained in England until April 1918 working in the administration of military records at A.I.F. headquarters in London, where he rose to the rank of corporal (and later acting staff-sergeant).

In London, Hartt contributed cartoons to Bystander, The Graphic, The Passing Show and London Opinion magazines. He was one of six Australian artists resident in England at that time who contributed drawings for the souvenir programme of an exhibition game of Australian Rules football held in October 1916 in London between two teams of Australian servicemen.

In London, Hartt began working on a collection of his cartoons and drawings about Australian soldiers, which he published as Humorosities in 1917. Hartt's book, which sold for a shilling a copy, was a great success with over 60,000 copies being sold in Great Britain. His drawings in Humorosities portrayed the Australian 'digger' as self-reliant, easy-going and disrespectful of authority, "more interested in avoiding tedious rules than in obedient conformity". Hartt's book of drawings was often purchased by Australian soldiers as a memento of their military experience. After the publication of Humorosities, Hartt received a letter from John Fortescue, the King's librarian at Windsor Castle, thanking him for a copy Hartt had sent to him. Fortescue described the volume as "a welcome addition to the literature of the war, and doubly welcome as an Australian contribution". He invited Hartt to send "an original sketch or two... with the prices marked" with a view to their inclusion in "the King's collection of drawings". Humorosities was also sold in Australia, distributed by Gordon and Gotch Ltd.

Hartt returned to Australia aboard the H.M.A.T. Marathon, arriving in Sydney in June 1918. During the journey to Australia, Hartt and one of his comrades issued regular editions of a one-page news-sheet called The Bonzer Times. Due to a paper shortage, it was published as a single copy, posted outside the orderly room so all on board could read it, and "its smartly-written descriptions of doings on board kept a crowd round it all day long". Hartt was discharged from the army on 23 July 1918 "in consequence of medical unfitness".

=== Smith's Weekly ===
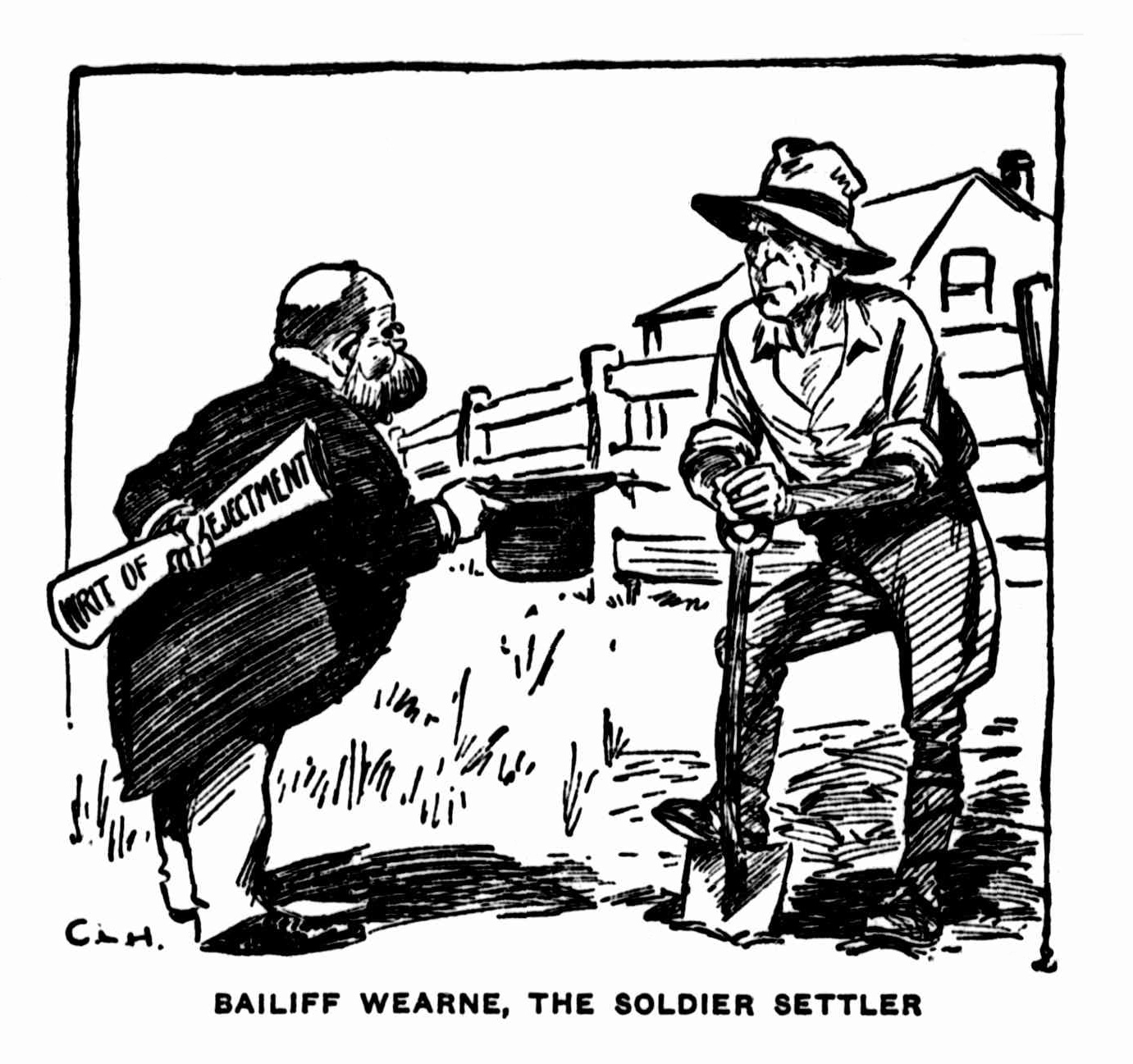
'Bailiff Wearne, the Soldier Settler', depicting Walter Wearne, New South Wales Minister for Lands (from Smith's Weekly, 21 March 1925).

The writer Frank Reid had served with Hartt in the 18th Battalion at Gallipoli. After Reid returned to Australia from the Middle East in October 1918, he went to the Bulletin office "to collect a tidy cheque for scores of contributions" he had sent while on military service overseas. While he was there, Reid encountered Cecil Hartt, "limping on a walking stick". Hartt was in the Bulletin office "making enquiries about the possibilities of working up an Australian edition of 'The Passing Show', a humorous London weekly, but somehow he didn't get much encouragement from the big newsagents, and the idea was dropped".

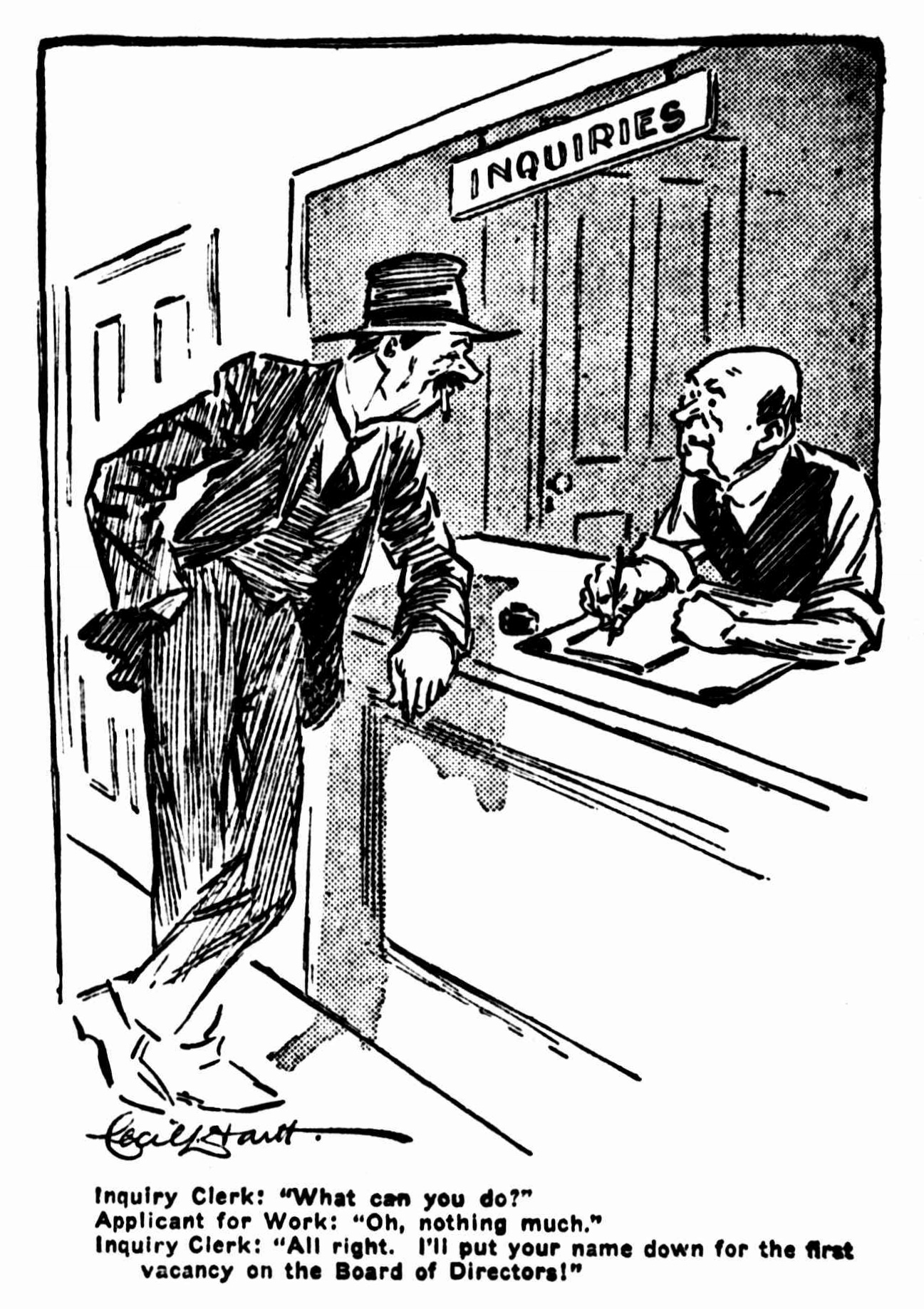
Inquiry Clerk: "What can you do?" Applicant for Work: "Oh, nothing much." Inquiry Clerk: "All right. I'll put your name down for the first vacancy on the Board of Directors!" (from Smith's Weekly, 17 May 1924).

After his return to Sydney, Hartt was living with his wife Ruby in their "neat little bungalow" at Dee Why. His friend and colleague, Frank Reid, was living at Collaroy, so "they saw a great deal of each other". Hartt went back to freelance drawing, but he found it hard to make a living. In 1918, The Bulletin was the only publication in Sydney purchasing cartoons "and if Cecil made 30/- a week he was lucky".

By the close of 1918, it had become known that Joynton Smith was in the process of establishing a new weekly newspaper in Sydney, to be named Smith's Weekly. Smith engaged theatrical publicist Claude McKay and journalist Clyde Packer in the new venture, with J. F. Archibald of The Bulletin as consulting editor. Advertisements seeking submissions from writers and artists were published in December 1918. Hartt saw an opening for a staff job and applied, becoming the first artist engaged by the new publication. Hartt's drawing style and humour were consistent with the populist left-wing ethos of Smith's Weekly, which set a radical nationalist tone and a disrespect of authority. The weekly newspaper published high quality cartoons on a broad range of subjects.

An important target audience for the Smith's Weekly was returned soldiers whose rights and causes the publication consistently championed, made apparent in the first issue when Joynton Smith described the returned digger as "the cream of our country's manhood [who] has become the sport of the politician". Hartt's 'More Digger Stories', featuring his distinctive squat characters, first appeared in the fourth issue of Smith's Weekly in late March 1919 and were a regular feature until March 1920, with others appearing irregularly after that. The cartoons from 'More Digger Stories' proved to be "exceedingly popular" and were later collected in publications (Diggerettes in 1919 and More Diggerettes in 1920), which sold for one shilling each.

From July 1919 until October 1924, Smith's Weekly featured a regular column called the "Sailors' and Soldiers' Parliament" that covered issues and stories specific to returned servicemen. This column often featured Hartt's 'Diggerette' cartoons. In September 1924, the newspaper started a regular feature called "Unofficial History of the A.I.F." in which "every Digger" was invited "to tell the real story of the A.I.F." Drawings by Hartt on themes related to the military or returned servicemen were occasionally used in this column (some rendered as his 'Diggerette' figures). From November 1925 to March 1926, the banner used for the "Unofficial History of the A.I.F." column featured 'Diggerette' figures drawn by Hartt (two versions). Hartt continued to include Digger cartoons within his wider body of work up until his death in May 1930.^{[B]}

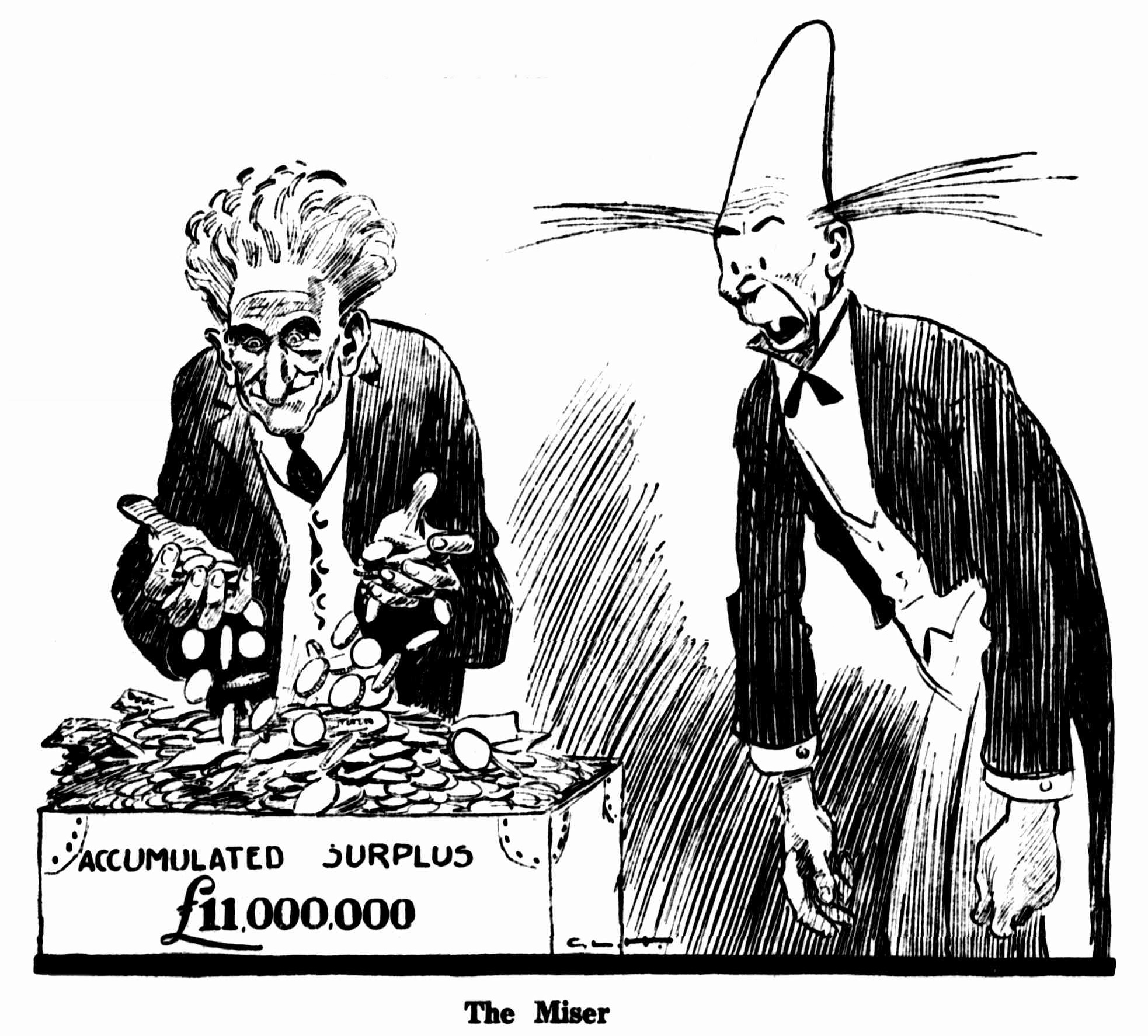
'The Miser' by Cecil Hartt (from Smith's Weekly, 5 July 1924), featuring a caricature of the Federal Treasurer, Earl Page, and a dumbfounded 'Dummy'.

One of the regular characters created by Hartt was 'Dummy', the hapless clown, described as "Australia's national figure of pathos" who "carries all the burdens and woes of our beloved country". Dummy made his first appearance in the 26 April 1919 edition of Smith's Weekly, in response to the public health measures imposed by the New South Wales Minister of Public Health to combat the third wave of the influenza pandemic. The character was frequently used by Hartt to denote the "long suffering" Everyman, the "poor witless creature" who was "the butt of every politician and tax-gatherer, victim of every unscrupulous tradesman". Before very long, the concept of 'Dummy' took on a life of its own, being adopted as a recurring motif at Smith's Weekly by journalists, poets and other artists (alongside Hartt's own depictions of the character). At the inaugural Artists' Masquerade Ball held at Sydney Town Hall on 21 August 1922, Hartt attended the event dressed as his own 'Dummy' character.

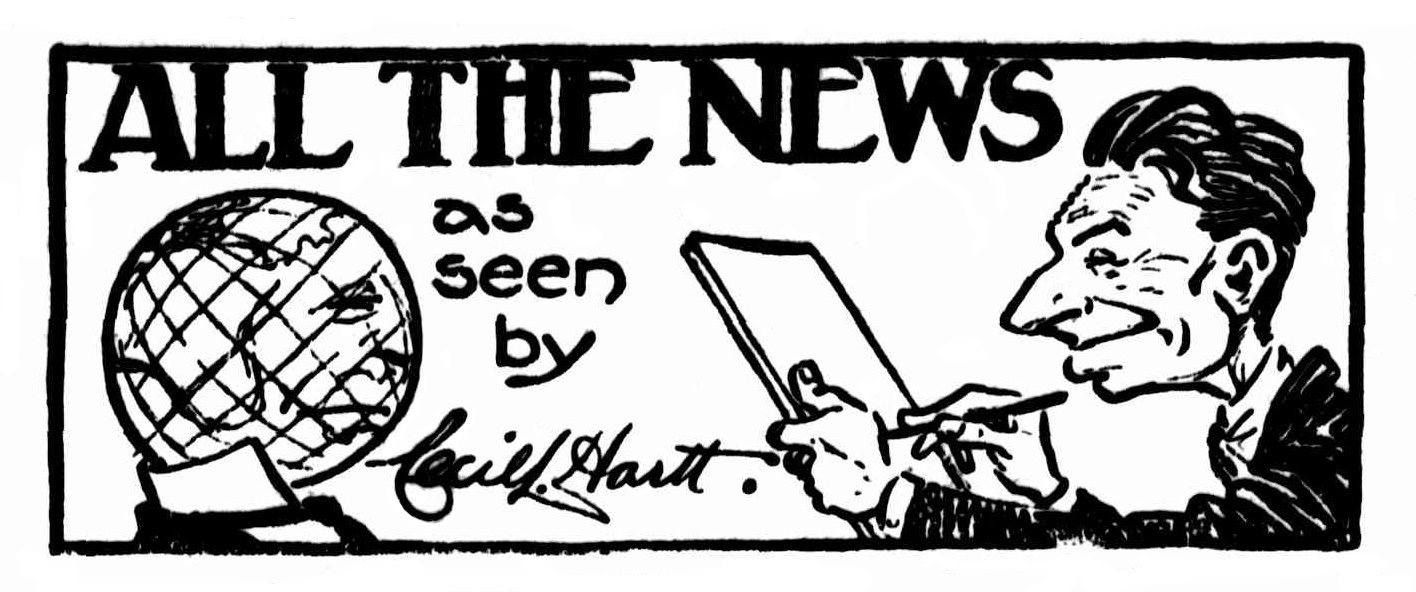
One of the banners used for Cecil Hartt's semi-regular column (from Smith's Weekly, 19 August 1922).

Hartt had a semi-regular feature on page four of Smith's Weekly that began in July 1922 and finished in March 1925. Entitled 'All the News as seen by Cecil L. Hartt' and 'The World as seen by Cecil L. Hartt', the column presented the cartoonist's satirical responses to topical issues and news stories. In late 1924, Hartt created a comic strip featuring caricatures of the Prime Minister Stanley Bruce, Bruce's coalition partner Earl Page and the Minister for Trade and Customs, Herbert Pratten. The strip was a regular feature from December 1924 until March 1925 and often featured the wowserish 'Auntie Pratten' and a top-hatted Bruce. Hartt followed this with the 'Ask Bill, He Knows Everything' comic strip, featuring the pontificating character Bill and his mates Gus and Steve. 'Ask Bill' first appeared in April 1925 and was a regular feature of Smith's Weekly until Hartt's death in 1930. The original inspiration for 'Bill' was said to be Billy Bournes, a war-time Labor agitator and anti-conscriptionist who eventually went to live in Tennant Creek.^{[C]}

Hartt also created the down-and-out characters of 'Orace and 'Erbert (sometimes also named Bert, 'Erb or Cuthbert), who were featured in occasional cartoons of his during the 1920s. Other Smith's Weekly artists also drew their own versions of the pair. Hartt also used Steele Rudd's popular characters of 'Dad and Dave' in a number of his cartoons.

In May 1922, Hartt ("care of Smith's Weekly") reported to police the theft of two medals belonging to him ("a Victory war medal and a General Service medal") as well as a silver cigarette case, each of which had "Cecil L. Hartt" engraved on them. The artist James R. Jackson entered a portrait of Cecil Hartt in the 1922 Archibald Prize competition at the Art Gallery of New South Wales. In about December 1922, Hartt became art director at Smith's Weekly after the death of his colleague Alex Sass.

In March 1923, Hartt sued for divorce from his wife Ruby "on the grounds of adultery" with a man named William Wilson. A decree nisi was granted. A decree absolute was granted in September 1923. Cecil Hartt and Iris ('Biddy') Brewer were married in late October 1923 at Mosman. The couple had a daughter named Diana, born in August 1926.

Hartt was elected as the first president of the Society of Australian Black and White Artists, formed in July 1924. He was re-elected to the position in 1925. In the following years, Hartt continued to be involved with the Society in various capacities, including on organising committees for the annual Black and White Artists' Ball.

Cecil Hartt was known to his friends and colleagues as "an utterly tolerant and uncritical person, kind and good-hearted". He stood a fraction under six feet tall and "fitted the popular conception of the typical lean Australian".

=== Death ===
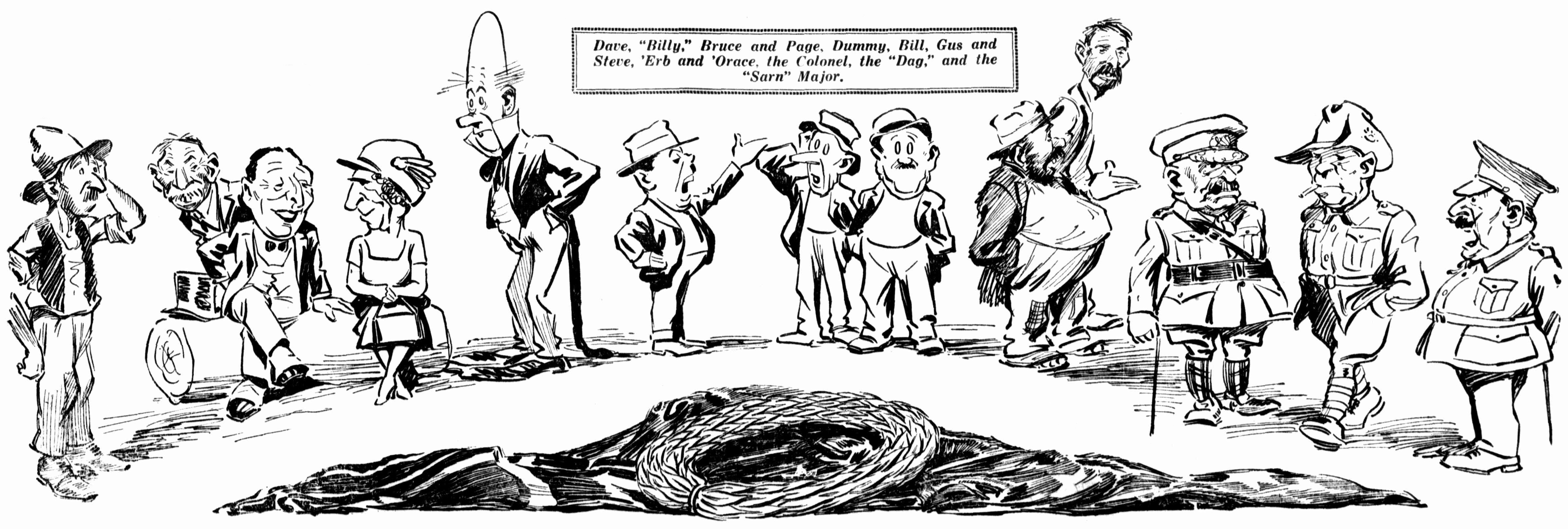
'These People He Once Made to Live, They Remain Though Their Creator be Dead'; from the dedication to Cecil Hartt in Smith's Weekly (31 May 1930) after his death. The characters are (l. to r.): Dave; prime ministers Billy Hughes and Stanley Bruce and Bruce's coalition partner Earl Page (as husband and wife); Dummy; Bill, declaiming to Gus and Steve; 'Erb and 'Orace; and, three Diggerettes characters, the Colonel, the 'Dag' and the 'Sarn' Major.

Cecil Hartt died on or about 17 May 1930 in the bush near Moruya on the far south coast of New South Wales, in circumstances leading to the conclusion he had taken his own life.^{[D]} His body was found on 20 May near his abandoned motor car on the Pollwombra Mountain road, about three miles (4.8 km) north of Moruya. Hartt had suffered a gun-shot wound to his head and a double-barrelled shotgun was found beside his body. It was subsequently reported that Hartt "had been despondent and unhappy" for several weeks before his death. He had said he "felt run down" and needed a holiday "somewhere in the country where he could rest and find inspiration". Hartt had left his home on Friday, 16 May to "ramble around in the bush". At the inquest into his death a note written by Hartt was submitted, which read: "I have been through hell in the last few days. I would be better out of the way".

The Coroner concluded Hartt, aged 45 years, had died from a self-inflicted gunshot wound "while temporarily insane". His tragic death came as a shock to his family, friends and colleagues. It is likely Hartt suffered from "post-traumatic stress brought on by his war injuries", probably aggravated by a dependence on alcohol. The artist was survived by his widow 'Biddy', their three-year-old daughter Diana and his son Lawrence (from his first marriage).^{[E]}

Cecil Hartt's remains were cremated on 22 May 1930 at Rookwood crematorium, in a simple ceremony attended by many of his former colleagues and friends. A full page in the 31 May 1930 edition of Smith's Weekly was dedicated to Hartt's memory; the page included poetry, a written appreciation of their former comrade, and a cartoon line-up of the most well-known of the characters he had created. After Hartt's death, Stan Cross said of his friend and Smith's Weekly colleague: "He was nearest of all his contemporaries to the Australian tradition, as far as humorous art can expound it, and we practitioners, as well as Australian comic art in the abstract, owe him a lot".

== Gallery ==
A selection of images by Cecil Hartt
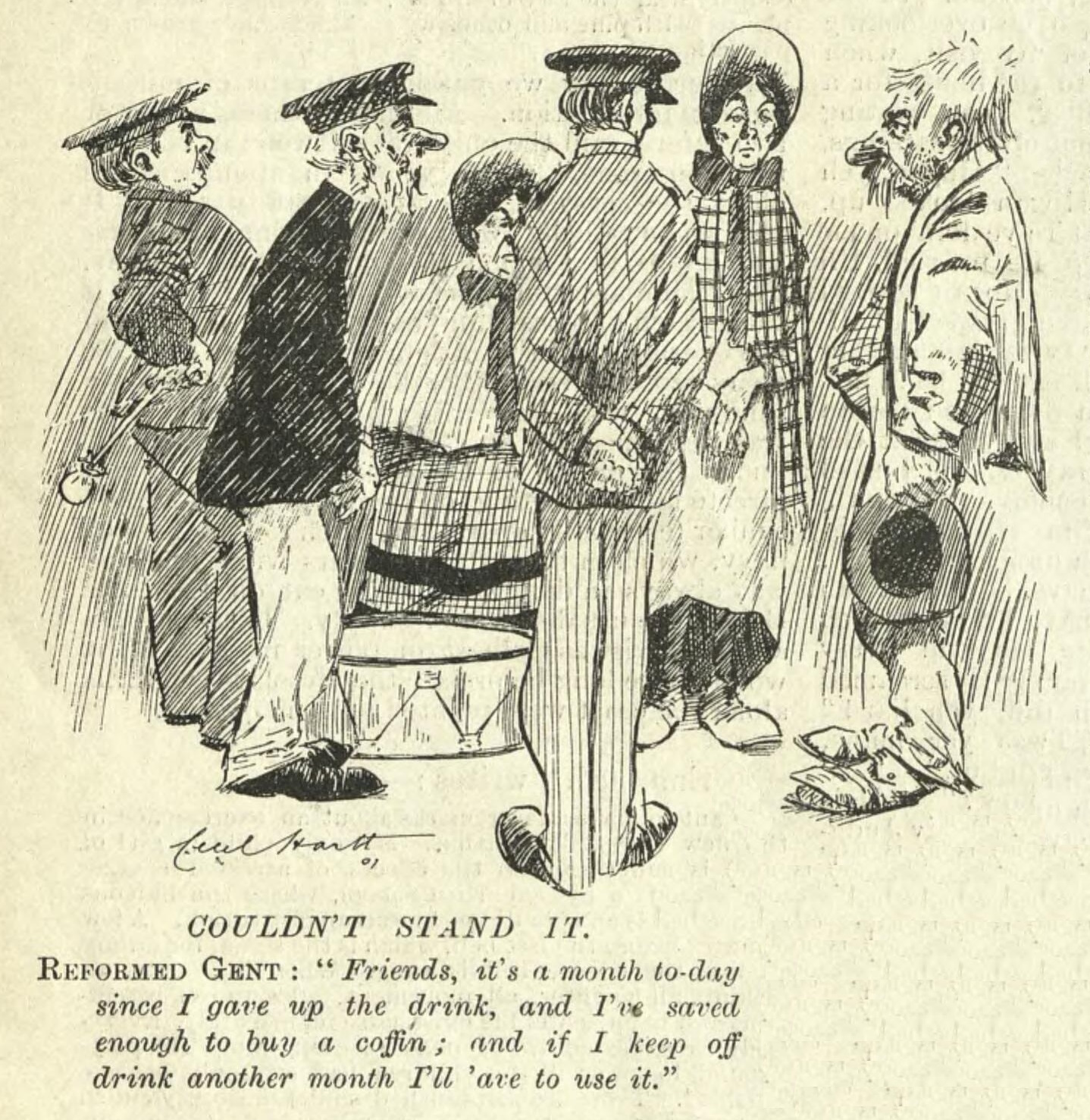
'Couldn't Stand It', cartoon published in The Bulletin, 22 August 1907.

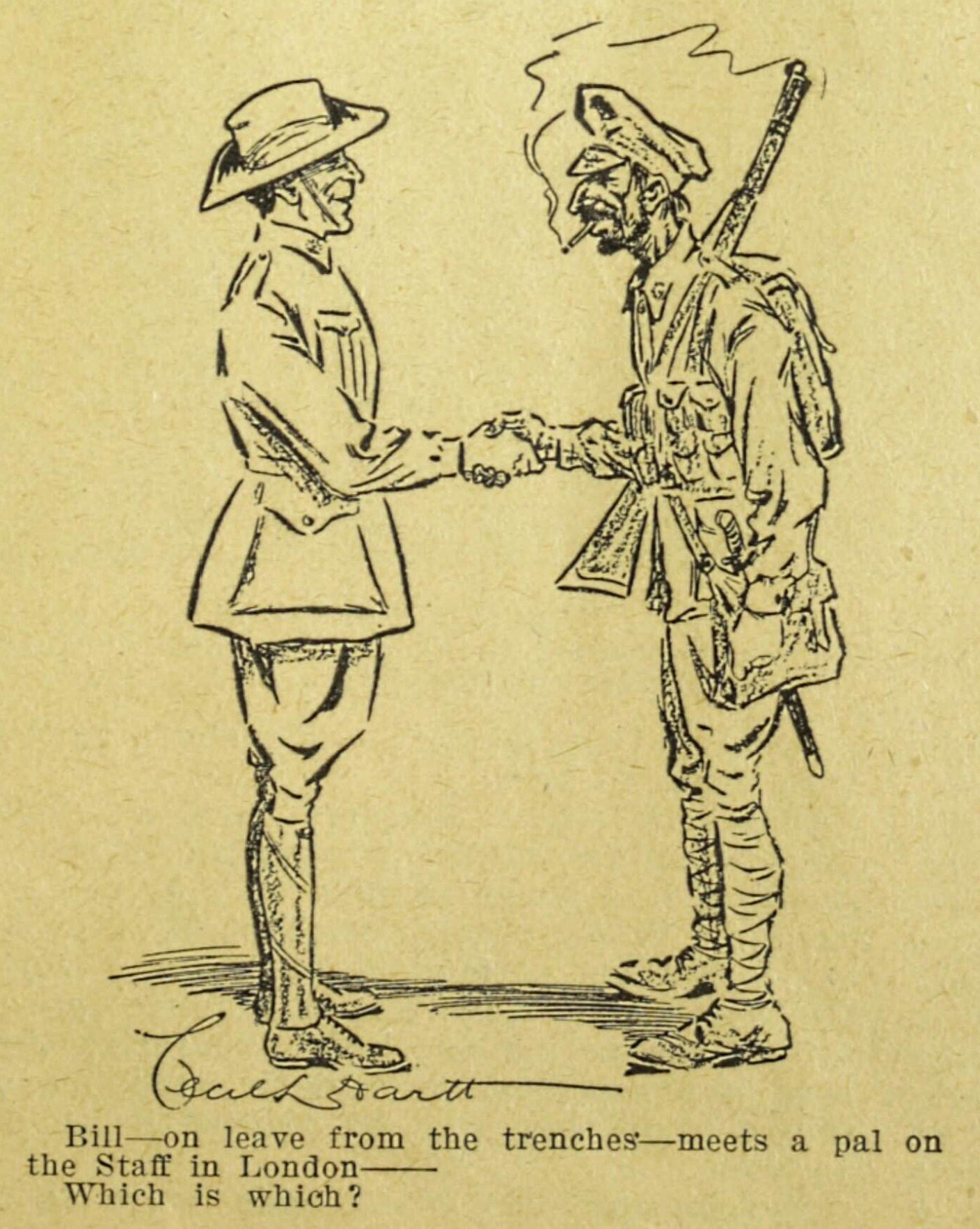
'Bill – on leave from the trenches – meets a pal on the Staff in London — Which is which?' (from Humorosities, published in The Lone Hand, 1 February 1917).

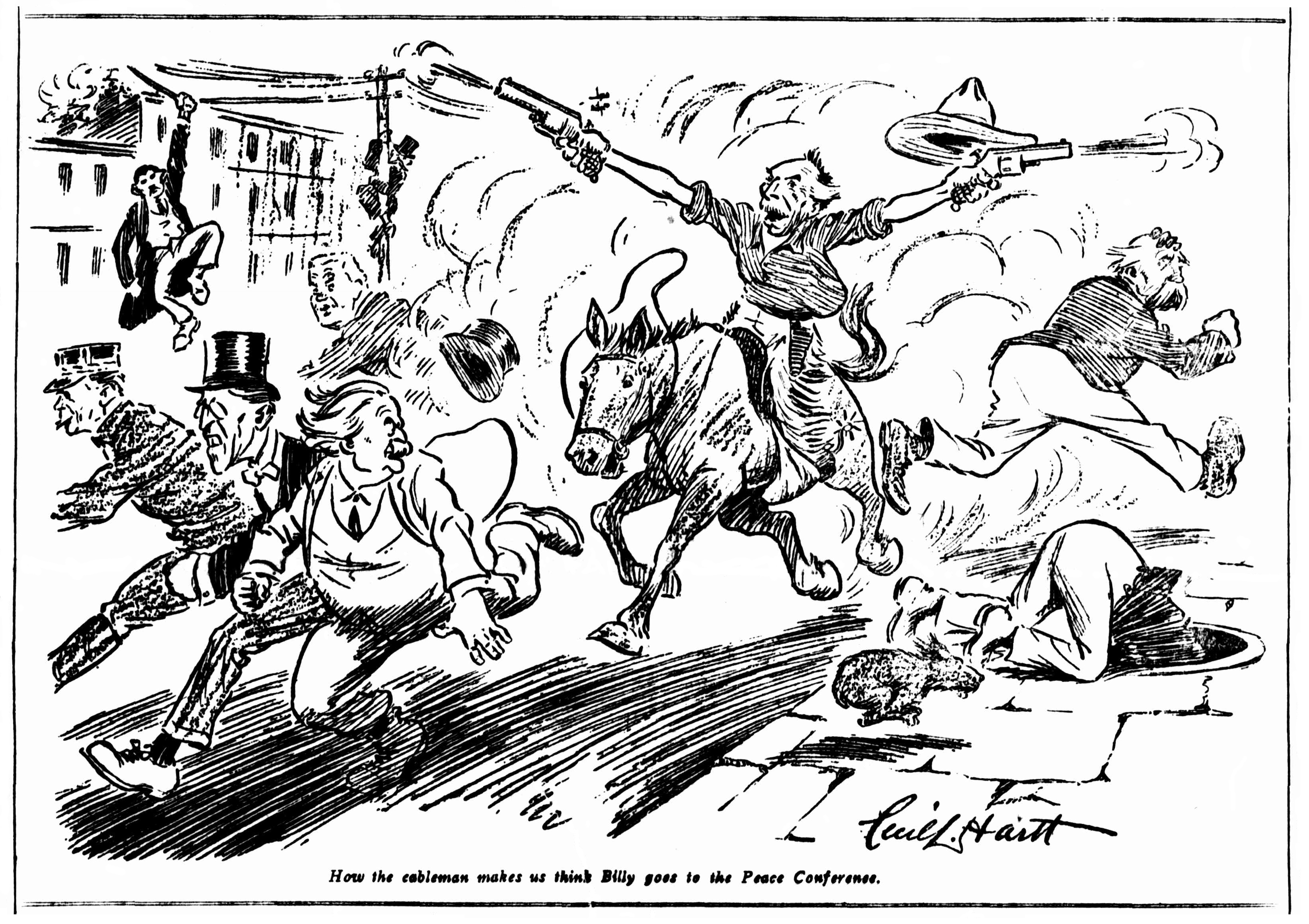
'How the cableman makes us think Billy goes to the Peace Conference' (published in Smith's Weekly, 1 March 1919; featuring a representation of Billy Hughes, Australian prime minister from October 1915 to February 1923).

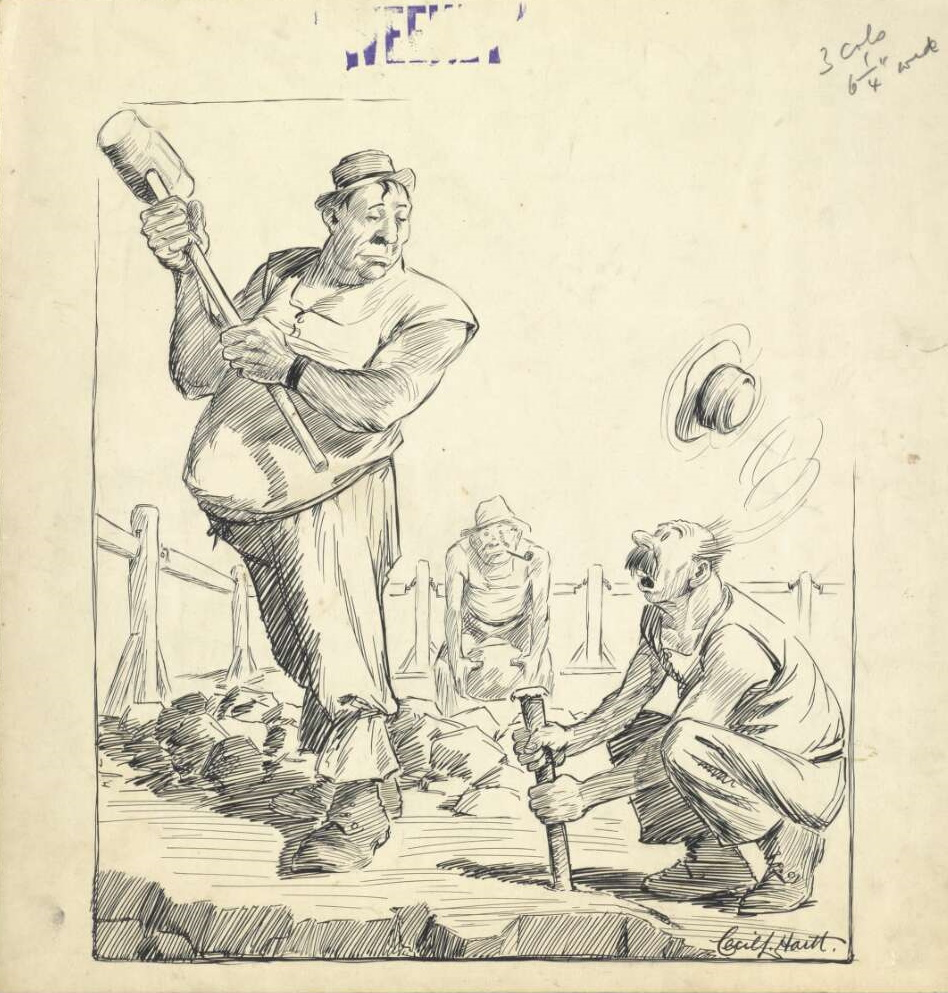
'Hammering' (drawn for Smith's Weekly, dated 1919).

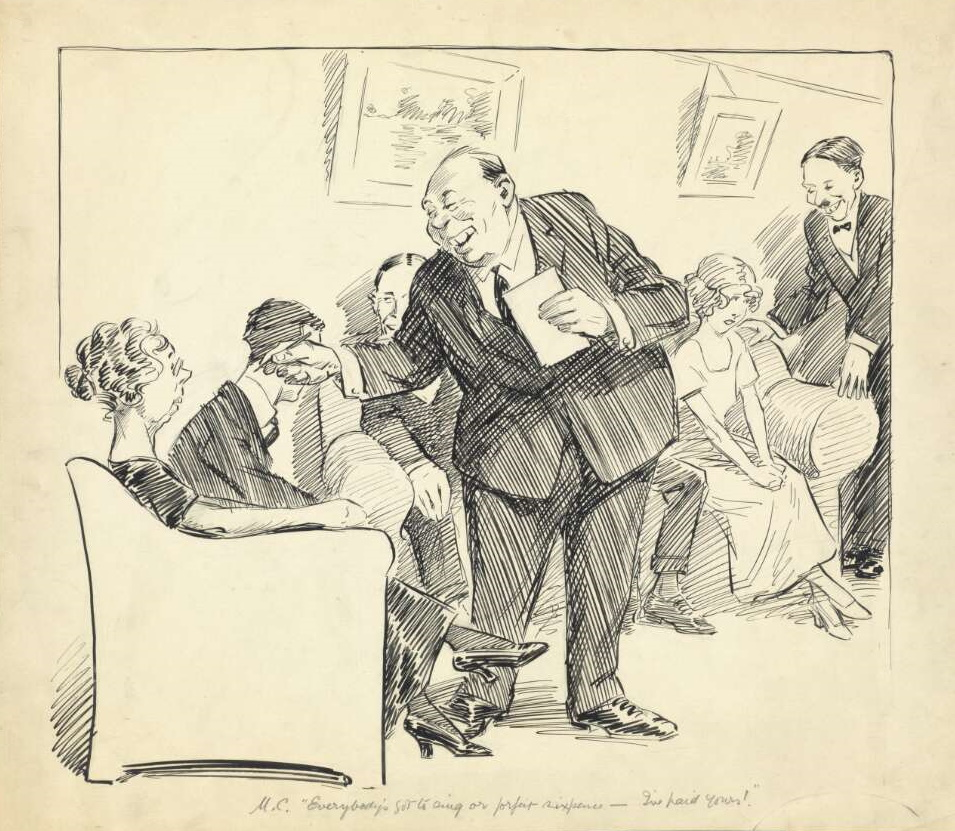
'M. C. "Everybody's got to sing or forfeit sixpence - I've paid yours!"' (drawn for Smith's Weekly, undated).

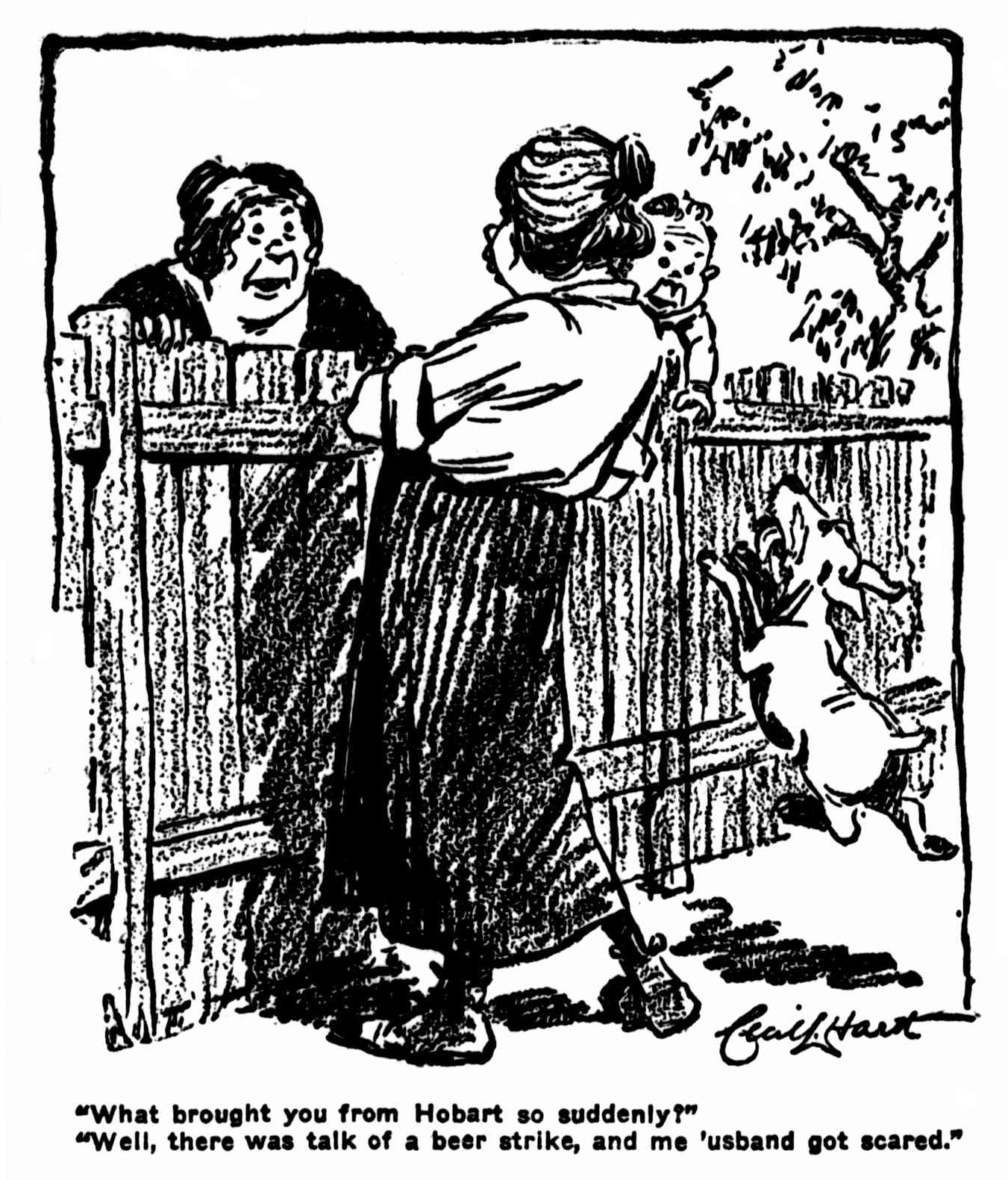
"What brought you from Hobart so suddenly?"
"Well, there was talk of a beer strike, and me 'usband got scared." (published in Smith's Weekly, 28 March 1925).

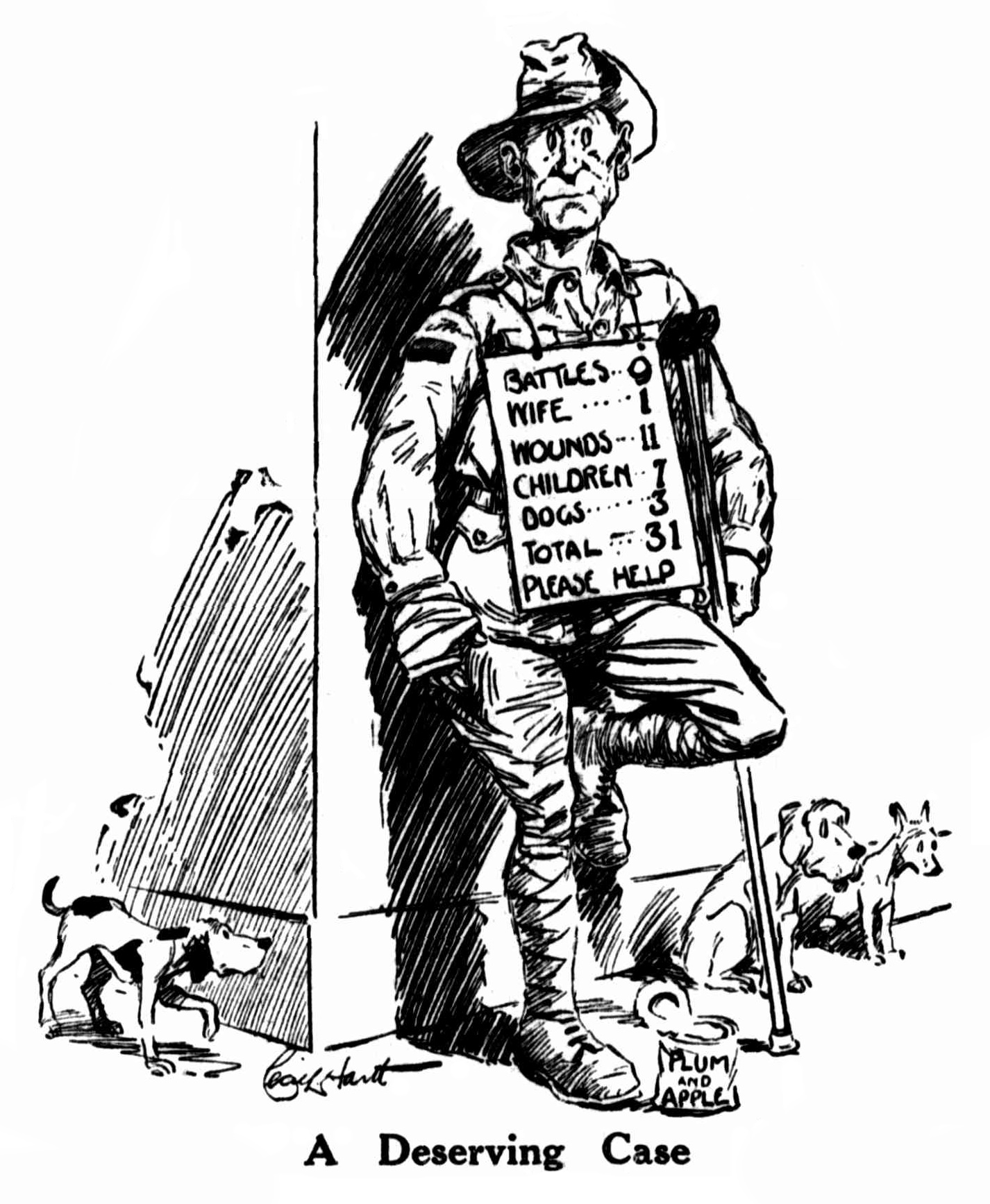
'A Deserving Case' (published in Smith's Weekly, 28 April 1928).

== Publications ==
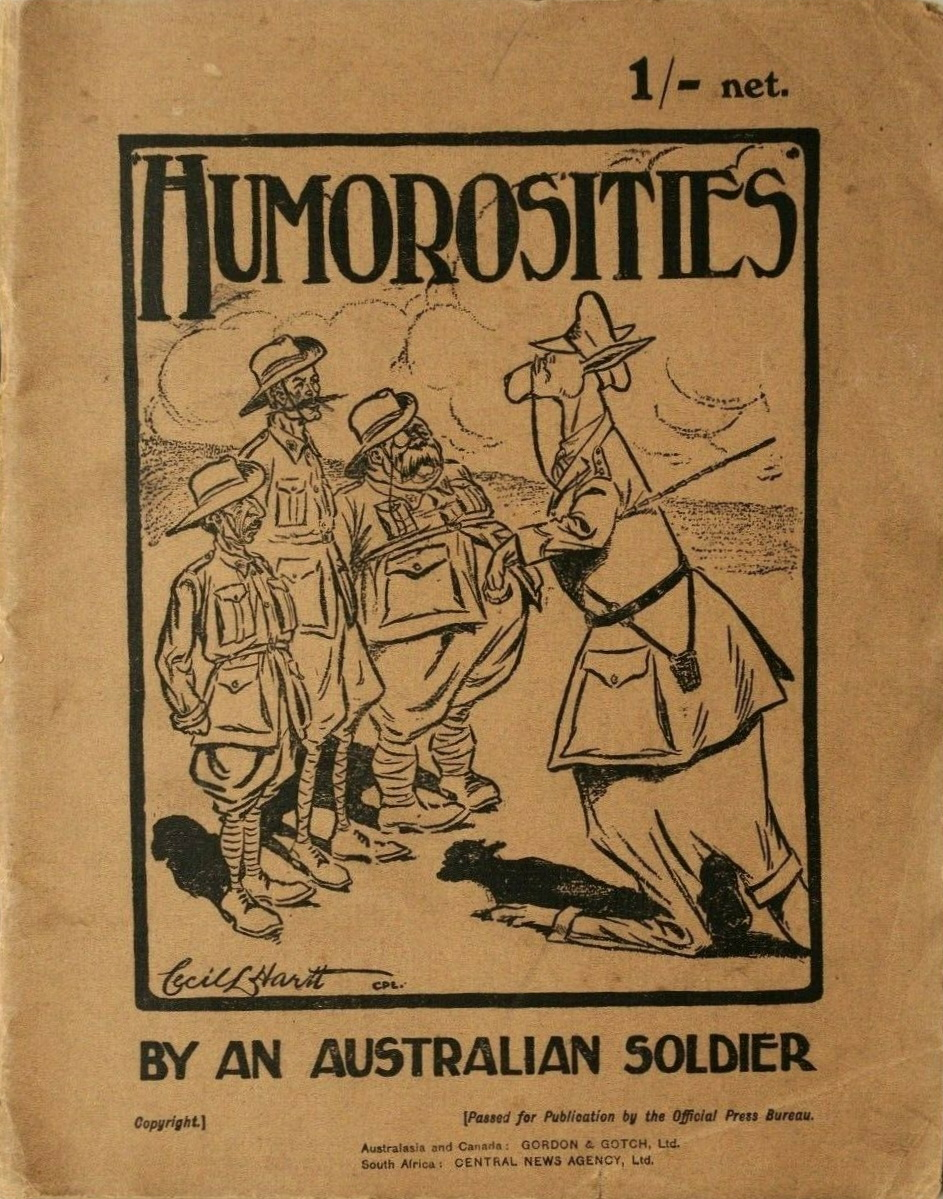
The front-cover of Cecil Hartt's Humorosities.

- Newspaper Cartoonists' Association of New South Wales (1915), Sydneyites: As we see 'em 1913-14-15 (Sydney: W. S. Grubb & Co.) – contributing artists: Hugh McLean, Sydney Ure Smith, Harry Julius, Tom Ferry, Will Donald, Cecil Hartt and Hugh McCrae.
- Souvenir programme (1916), Pioneer Exhibition Game: Australian Football (London: Wightman & Co.) – contributing artists: Ruby Lindsay, Will Dyson, Fred Leist, Laurie Tayler, Cecil Hartt and Dan Lindsay.
- Cecil L. Hartt (c. 1916-1917), Humorosities: By an Australian Soldier (London: Australian Trading & Agencies Co. Ltd.).
- Cecil L. Hartt (c. 1919), Diggerettes: Digger Jokes & Stories (Sydney: A. C. Sandford).
- Cecil L. Hartt (c. 1920), More Diggerettes: The Latest Collection of Digger Jokes and Stories (Sydney: A. C. Sandford).
- Cecil L. Hart (1924 & 1925; two editions), Souvenir of the M.C.C. XI 1924-25 : Sketches by Cecil L. Hartt (Sydney: R. C. Switson; Sydney: W. F. Brown).

== Notes ==
A.James Hartt married the recently widowed Francis Hannah Heeps (née Sedgwick), whose husband had died in September 1906 at Warrnambool.

B.After Hartt's death Frank Dunne, who had joined the staff of Smith's Weekly in late 1927, increasingly began to draw Digger cartoons and developed characters suggestive of Hartt's shortened 'Diggerette' figures, but rendered in Dunne's distinctive style.

C.Smith's Weekly made several attempts to resurrect Hartt's popular comic strip, 'Ask Bill, He Knows Everything'. During 1931, from March to December, the strip was drawn by an unnamed artist. From November 1936 until September 1939 the strip was drawn by Jim Russell.

D.The exact date of Cecil Hartt's death was not determined. Hartt's body was found on 20 May 1930 and police believed "the body had been there at least 24 hours". Family notices of Hartt's death nominate the date as 17 May.

E.Private Lawrence Hartt (QX30925; 2/6th Independent Company, Australian Infantry) was killed in action in New Guinea on 24 November 1942 during World War Two and is interred in the Bomana War Cemetery in Port Moresby.

== See also ==
- 1916 Pioneer Exhibition Game
