= The Canberra Times =

Daily newspaper in Canberra, Australia

Coordinates: 35°19′29″S 149°10′12″E

- Type: Daily newspaper
- Format: Compact
- Owner: Australian Community Media
- Editor: John-Paul Moloney
- Founded: 1926; 100 years ago
- Headquarters: 121 Marcus Clarke Street, Canberra City, ACT
- ISSN: 0157-6925 (print); 2653-0996 (web)
- OCLC number: 220340116
- Website: www.canberratimes.com.au

The Canberra Times is a daily newspaper in Canberra, Australia, which is published by Australian Community Media. It was founded in 1926, and has changed ownership and format several times.

== History ==
The Canberra Times was launched in 1926 by Thomas Shakespeare along with his oldest son Arthur Shakespeare and two younger sons Christopher and James. The newspaper's headquarters were originally located in the Civic retail precinct, in Cooyong Street and Mort Street, in blocks bought by Thomas Shakespeare in the first sale of Canberra leases in 1924.

The newspaper's first issue was published on 3 September 1926. It was the second paper to be printed in the city, the first being The Federal Capital Pioneer. Between September 1926 and February 1928, the newspaper was a weekly issue. The first daily issue was 28 February 1928. In June 1956, The Canberra Times converted from broadsheet to tabloid format.

Arthur Shakespeare sold the paper to John Fairfax Ltd in 1964, on the condition that it continue to advocate for Canberra. Soon after, in July 1964, the format was switched back to broadsheet and printing was moved to Fairfax's newly installed press in Fyshwick. Offices remained open in the Civic retail precinct until April 1987 when The Canberra Times moved its entire operation to the new office of The Federal Capital Press of Australia, also in Fyshwick.

The Canberra Times' sign outside its headquarters in 121 Marcus Clarke Street

In 1988, the paper and the Federal Capital Press was sold to Kerry Packer's Australian Consolidated Press for a total amount of $250 million, which in turn sold it to Kerry Stokes in 1989 for a price greater than $65 million. Rural Press Limited bought the paper from Stokes in August 1998 for $160 million. The Times rejoined the Fairfax stable in 2007 when Rural Press merged with Fairfax. The paper first went online on 31 March 1997.

In 2008, The Canberra Times printed a formal apology after the paper published an essay in which Irfan Yusuf falsely accused American historian Daniel Pipes of suggesting that Muslims deserved to be slaughtered as Jews were during The Holocaust.

On 17 October 2008, The Canberra Times was distributed with a sticker advertising the ACT Labor Party on the front page. Complaints about the sticker prompted the general manager, Ken Nichols, to issue an explanation.

In October 2013, Fairfax Media announced that The Canberra Times would be restructured to join the Australian Community Media Group of regional, agricultural and community newspapers, shifting from the metropolitan news division of Fairfax. A new editorial leadership team was appointed in November 2015, with Grant Newton as editor of the newspaper and Scott Hannaford as deputy editor and news director.

In March 2016, staff at the newspaper were told there would be a restructure at The Canberra Times and that the paper would move from a broadsheet format to a tabloid. Fairfax Media also announced they would be cutting 12 jobs from the newspaper's staff.

In December 2018, Fairfax was acquired by Nine Entertainment; in April 2019, Nine sold the Australian Community Media business, including The Canberra Times, to a consortium led by Antony Catalano.

In September 2021, The Canberra Times moved from its Fyshwick headquarters to an office building on Marcus Clarke Street in Civic.

The former headquarters site was sold in 2022, and was demolished in 2025.

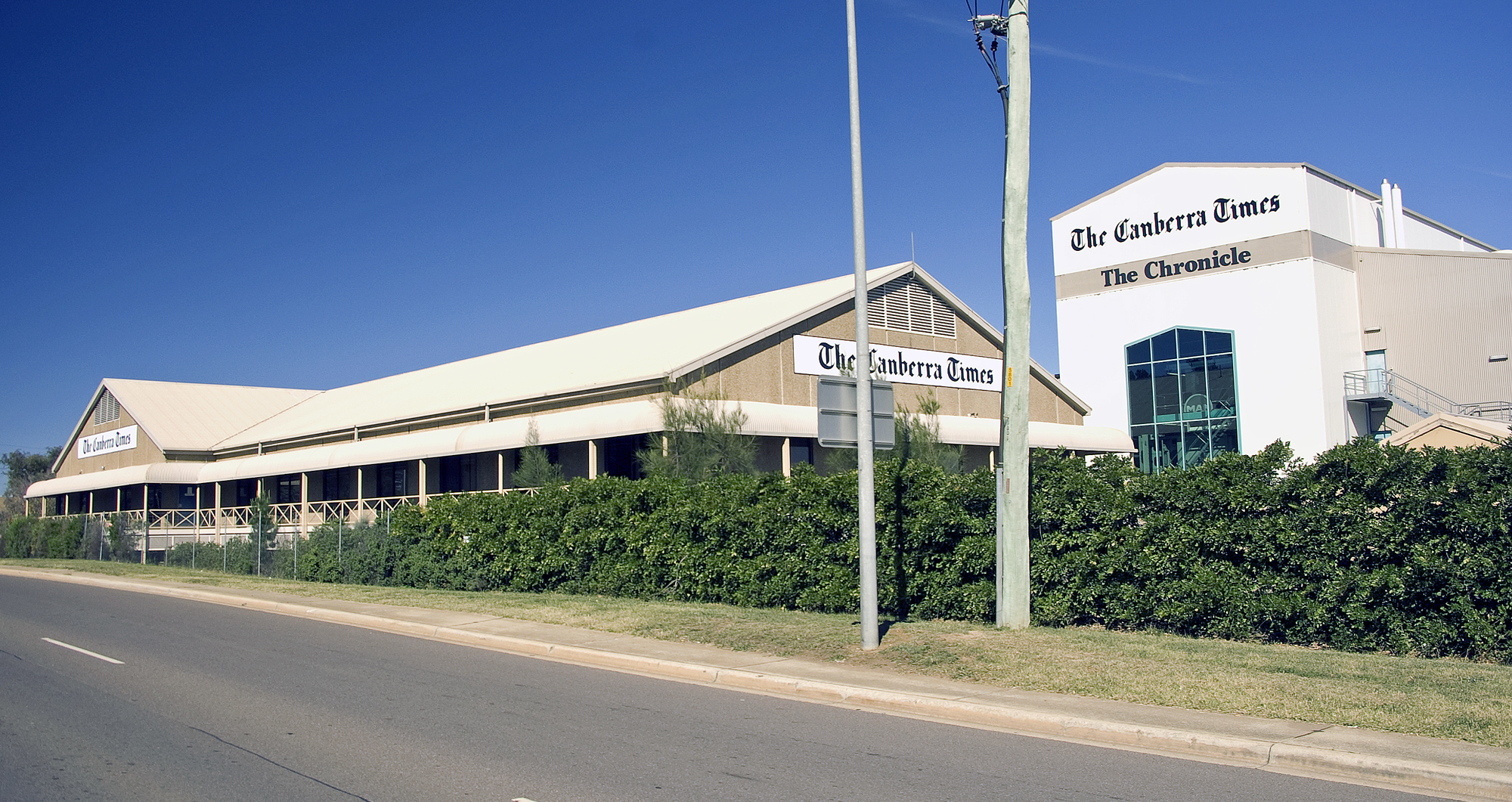
The Canberra Times and The Chronicle headquarters at Fyshwick

== Content ==
=== The Guide ===
The Guide was launched in July 1988, as a television and radio guide.

== Notable staff ==
The paper's editors have included Jack Waterford and Michelle Grattan (1993–95). A recent editor-in-chief, Peter Fray, left in January 2009 to edit The Sydney Morning Herald. He was succeeded by Rod Quinn, formerly of the Newcastle Herald. He announced the formation of a new senior editorial team in 2012. Since 2015, the managing editor is John-Paul Moloney.

Editorial cartoonists have included Geoff Pryor, David Pope and Pat Campbell.

== Endorsements ==
Federal election endorsements
National election	Endorsement
2010	Labor
2013	Coalition
2016	Coalition
2019	No endorsement
2022	Labor
2025	Labor

Territory election endorsements
National election	Endorsement	Ref
2012	Labor	
2016	Liberal	

== See also ==
- List of newspapers in Australia
- List of magazines in Australia
