= Bruce Petty =

Australian animator (1929–2023)

Bruce Leslie Petty (23 November 1929 – 6 April 2023) was an Australian political satirist, sculptor and cartoonist. He was a regular contributor to Melbourne's The Age newspaper. His intricate images have been described as "doodle-bombs" for their free-association of links between various ideas, people and institutions. Age journalist Martin Flanagan wrote that Petty "re-invented the world as a vast scribbly machine with interlocking cogs and levers that connected people in wholly logical but unlikely ways."

He received a Silver Stanley Award from the Australian Cartoonists' Association; an AFI Best Documentary Director prize; Melbourne Press Club's Quill Lifetime Achievement Award; and the Most Outstanding Contribution to Journalism Walkley Award.

== Early life ==
Petty was born on 23 November 1929, at Doncaster, a suburb of Melbourne.

== Work ==
Petty began working for the Owen Brothers animation studio in Melbourne in 1949, before moving to the UK in 1954. His cartoons were published in The New Yorker, Esquire and Punch. On his return to Australia in 1961, he worked at first for The (Sydney) Daily Mirror, The Bulletin and The Australian before joining The Age in 1976.

In 1976, the animated film Leisure, of which he was the director, won an Academy Award for the producer Suzanne Baker (the first Australian woman to win an Oscar). "When I got it, the Oscar went to the producer. We got a picture of it, a very nice gold-framed picture." (The Age, 22 June 2004) Petty made a number of other animated films including Art, Australian History, Hearts and Minds and Karl Marx.

Petty also created a number of "machine sculptures" with the most famous being a piece known as "Man Environment Machine" (fondly known as the "Petty Machine") that was a feature piece of the Australian Pavilion at World Expo '85 at Tsukuba, Japan.

In 2007, he received the AFI Best Documentary Director prize for the documentary Global Haywire which he wrote, directed and animated, as well as the Best Documentary Sound prize; this documentary tries to unravel the global pattern that leads to an understanding of how the world came to be as it is today, and is based on interviews with intellectuals, students and journalists.

Petty's 2008 book, Petty's Parallel Worlds, is a retrospective collection of editorial cartoons from 1959 to the present, street sketches done on assignment around the world, and etchings. Those of Petty's cartoons that depict themes such as the economy, international relations or other social issues as complicated interlocking machines (that manipulate, or are manipulated by, people) have been likened to Rube Goldberg machines or Heath Robinson contraptions.

Petty died on 6 April 2023, at the age of 93.

== Influences ==
Petty said in the foreword to Parallel Worlds that he was a humanist and socialist, mentioning visits to Nicaragua and Cuba in the early 1960s, and feeling the influence of Colin Wilson's The Outsider.

== Personal life ==
Petty was married firstly to ABC journalist and film critic Julie Rigg. They had two sons. In 1988 he married author Kate Grenville, with whom he had a son and a daughter. He and Grenville separated, and Petty then partnered with the bookseller Lesley McKay.

== Awards ==
- 2001: Silver Stanley Award by the Australian Cartoonists' Association
- 2007: AFI Best Documentary Director prize and Best Documentary Sound prize for Global Haywire
- 2009: Melbourne Press Club's Quill Lifetime Achievement Award
- 2016: Most Outstanding Contribution to Journalism award, Walkley Awards

== Filmography ==
- Hearts and Minds (1968)
- Australian History (1971)
- Art (1974)
- Leisure (1976)
- Magic Arts (1978)
- Karl Marx (1979)
- Megalomedia (1983)
- Movers (1986)
- Money (1998)
- The Mad Century (2000)
- Human Contraptions (2002)
- Global Haywire (2007)

== Books ==
- Australian artist in South East Asia / Bruce Petty with introduction by Ronald Searle (1962)
- Petty's Australia fair / Bruce Petty (1967)
- A portfolio of Petty / Bruce Petty (1969)
- The best of Petty / 1968, Ed. Ron Smith
- The Penguin Petty (1972, ISBN 0-14-003639-3)
- Petty's Australia: and how it works / Bruce Petty (1976, ISBN 0-14-070060-9)
- The Petty age / Bruce Petty (1978, ISBN 0-909331-67-7)
- Petty's money book / Bruce Petty (1983, ISBN 0-00-636551-5)
- Women and men / Petty (1986, ISBN 0-04-820029-8)
- Bruce Petty's the absurd machine / Bruce Petty (1997, ISBN 0-14-025554-0)
- Petty's Parallel Worlds Bruce Petty (2008, Ed. Russ Radcliffe, ISBN 978-0-646-49028-1)

== General references ==
- Conversation with Bruce Petty (1972 sound recording) - interviewer, Hazel de Berg
- Interview with Bruce Petty, cartoonist and filmmaker (1996 sound recording) - interviewer, Ann Turner
- Portrait of Bruce Petty (picture) by Virginia Wallace-Crabbe
