= Geoff Pryor =

Australian political cartoonist

Geoffrey Pryor (born 1944 in Canberra) is a retired Australian political cartoonist. He was the editorial cartoonist for The Canberra Times newspaper between 1978 and 2008. During this 30-year career, Pryor generally drew seven cartoons per week for the newspaper. Pryor's style was influenced by his predecessor at The Canberra Times, Larry Pickering. His graphic style is ornate, much more detailed and portrait-like than that of such contemporaries as Patrick Cook. He was cartoonist for The Saturday Paper until his "second retirement" in December 2018.

The National Library of Australia holds Pryor’s collection of cartoons originally published in The Canberra Times.

In 2016, Pryor was inducted into the ACT Honour Walk, which recognises individuals and groups who have made significant contributions to Canberra and the Australian Capital Territory.

== Reference sources ==
- Portrait of Geoff Pryor, cartoonist by Virginia Wallace-Crabbe, 1997
- Interview with Geoff Pryor, cartoonist (sound recording) interviewed by Ann Turner, 1998
