= Tony Rafty =

Tony Rafty OAM
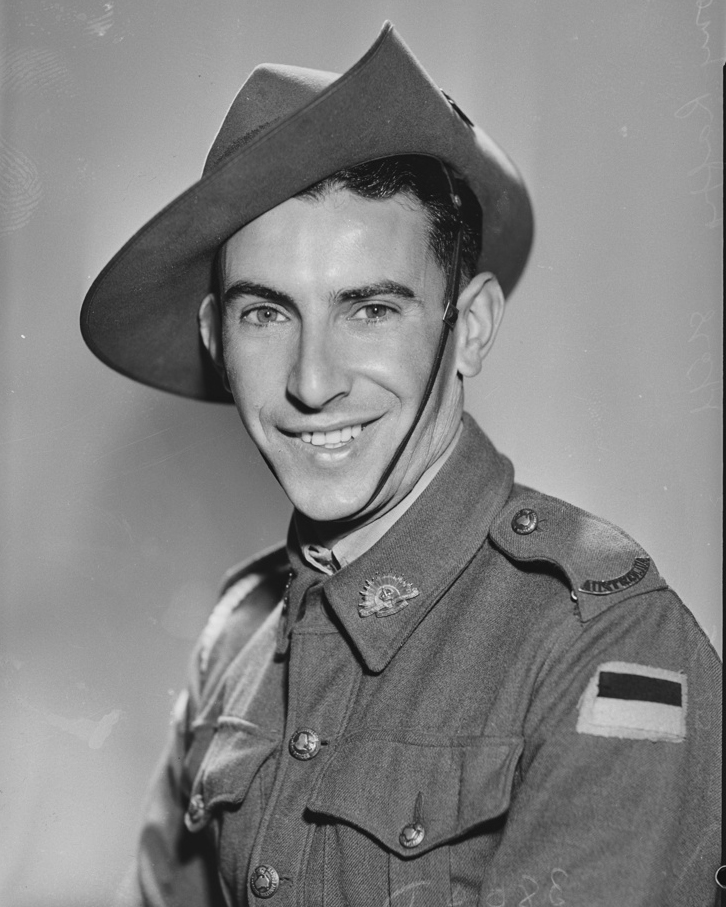
- Portrait of Tony Rafty in Australian Army uniform, 2 October 1942
- Born: Anthony Raftopoulos; 12 October 1915; Paddington, Sydney
- Died: 9 October 2015 (aged 99); Sydney, Australia
- Style: Caricature
- Spouse: Shirley Morey (m. 1946; w. 2012)

Tony Rafty OAM (born Anthony Raftopoulos; 12 October 1915 – 9 October 2015) was a Greek–Australian artist. He specialised in drawing caricatures.

== Biography ==
Rafty was born in Paddington, Sydney into a family of Greek origin. As a boy he first started drawing caricatures while caddying during the Depression.

During World War II, Rafty served as a war artist and journalist for the Australian Army, serving in New Guinea, Borneo and Singapore. He sketched the surrender of the Japanese in Singapore, and covered the release of POWs from prison camps, including Batu Lintang camp in Kuching, Sarawak. He completed many sketches of war action including a memorable one of Lord Louis Mountbatten. A few years later he covered the Indonesian War of Independence, and befriended President Sukarno of Indonesia. His considerable number of works from that era are housed in the National Library and the Australian War Memorial in Canberra, with others held at the Imperial War Museum in London.

Rafty caricatured politicians, sportspeople, and entertainers. He sketched sportsmen and women at every Olympic Games from 1948 (in London) to 1996 (in Atlanta). His work has been exhibited worldwide and over 15,000 of his caricatures have been featured in newspapers and magazines. In 1981 Rafty became the world's first caricaturist to have subjects appear on national stamps, with caricatures of sportsmen Victor Trumper , Walter Lindrum , Sir Norman Brookes and Darby Munro appearing on stamps issued by Australia Post. He also provided courtroom sketches for news bulletins on the Seven Network.

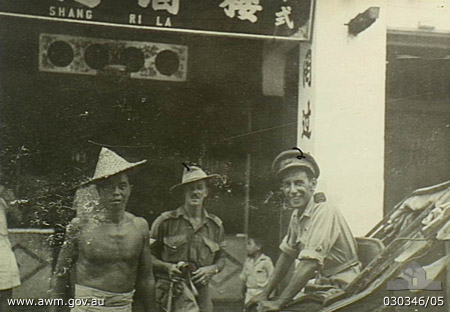
Tony Rafty (right, in rickshaw) in Kuching, Sarawak, on 12 September 1945, the day after its liberation by Australian armed forces.

Rafty was one of the founding members of the Australian Black and White Artists Club and served as its president; for 23 years he was on the board of directors of the Sydney Journalists Club, where he also held the position of President; he also served the Australian War Correspondents’ Association, and for many years, led the Australian War Correspondents Society veterans at the Anzac Day march.

In 1985, Rafty was awarded the Gold Cross of Mount Athos, one of Greece's highest honours, and in 1991 he was awarded the Order of Australia Medal for services to the media. Sir William Dargie, an Australian artist, eight-time winner of the Archibald Prize, and war artist with Rafty in World War II commented: “Tony Rafty is simply splendid. He not only brings an intellectual quality to his work, but he does it so well within a social context that he creates subjects which have a life of their own.”

== Some of his post-war images while a war-correspondent ==
These images were created while he was employed as a part-timer with The Sun newspaper as a war-correspondent, and was sent to Borneo and Singapore at the end of the Pacific War when he covered the post-war surrender period.

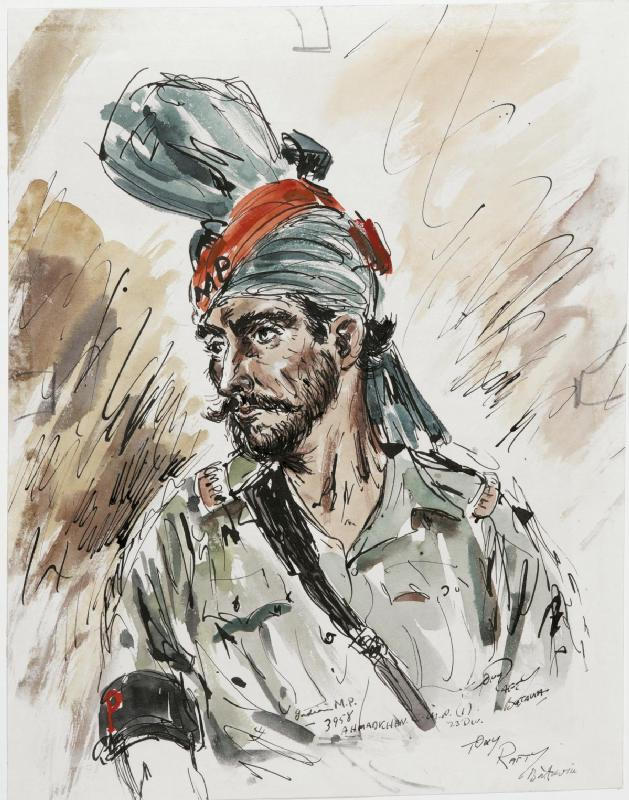
Indian Military Policeman, Batavia, 1945

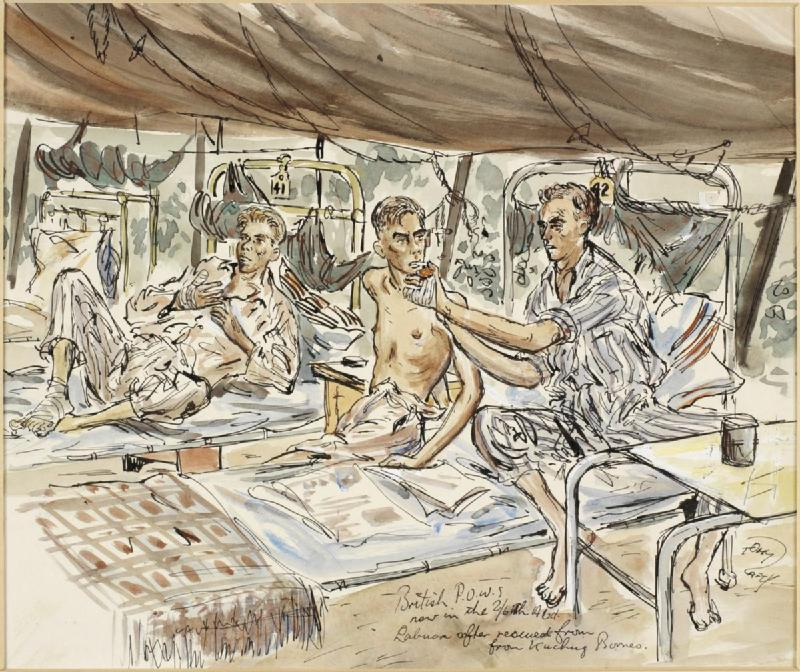
Prisoners of War, Kuching, 1945

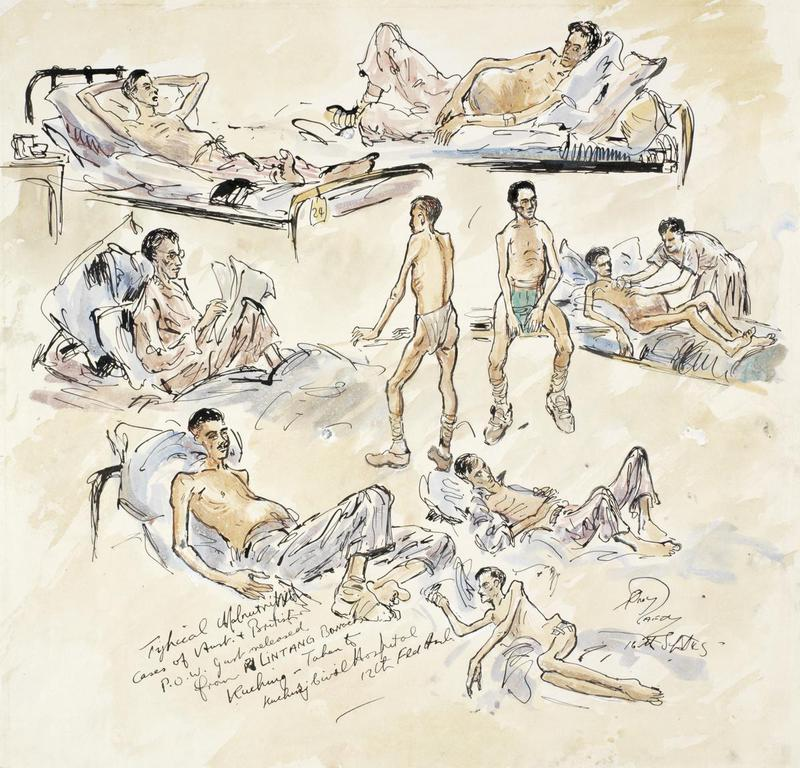
malnourished POWs, Kuching, 1945

== Personal life ==
Rafty was married to Shirley Morey for 66 years, the daughter of the New South Wales Labor politician Tom Morey. Shirley died in 2012. They had five children.

On 12 October 2005, Rafty celebrated his 90th birthday. He died on 9 October 2015, in an Eastern Suburbs hospital in Sydney, NSW from complications of pneumonia, three days short of his 100th birthday.

== Oral history ==
Rafty was interviewed in 1995 by Ros Bowden about his career and life. The recording of this can be found in the National Library of Australia.
