= Insanity Streak =

Insanity Streak is an Australian gag cartoon. It began a weekly cartoon in 1992, becoming a daily comic strip in 2000.
