= Roger Fletcher (cartoonist) =

Australian cartoonist and illustrator

- Born: 11 June 1948 (age 78) Murwillumbah, New South Wales
- Pseudonyms: Fletch, 'R'
- Notable works: Torkan
- Awards: 1999 Jim Russell Award (Stanley Awards)

Roger Fletcher (born 11 June 1949) is an Australian cartoonist and illustrator. His first comic strip, Torkan appeared in the Australian Sunday Telegraph in 1976 and his second comic strip, Staria, has appeared in the pages of the Australian Daily Telegraph since May 1980. Fletcher has taught children and adults the art of cartooning in the east coast of Australia and Ireland.

== Biography ==
Born in Murwillumbah, New South Wales, in 1949, Fletcher was captivated by newspaper comic strips and comic books from an early age. He has cited inspiration from English comics like Battler Britton, Paul Wheelahan's The Panther and Monty Wedd's Captain Justice.

Fletcher's first job after leaving high school was in the shipping industry but he had not given up his dream of becoming a professional comic artist. He studied art part-time at the Julian Ashton Art School and took a course in scriptwriting at the Australian Film and Television School.

During the early 1970s, Fletcher began developing a comic strip about an Australian soldier-of-fortune, titled Nathan Cole, until he was introduced to the world of sword and sorcery by science-fiction writer Fritz Leiber that had a profound impact on his future. In particular, the pair of characters called Fafhrd and the Gray Mouser influenced Fletcher greatly.

Fletcher put Nathan Cole aside and set about creating a sword and sorcery strip, titled Orn the Eagle Warrior, in 1974. Riding a giant eagle, sporting a beard and bristling with weapons, Orn's adventures took place on a strange world with a dying sun and two moons. Not everyone, however, shared Fletcher's enthusiasm for his grim barbarian hero.

"The reaction of every editor I showed Orn to was, 'What the hell have you been smokin', boy?' I was told in no uncertain terms that if I wanted to get it published, I'd have to tone it down more than a little. I wanted to be published in the Sunday comic pages, so I aimed for somewhere between Prince Valiant and Conan."

Born into the warrior clans of Aquiona, Fletcher's new hero, Torkan, was rarely bested in combat. Yet his broadsword could not protect him against his own fiery temper and weakness for comely wenches, both of which often landed him in trouble.

Torkan first appeared in Sydney's Sunday Telegraph newspaper in June 1976 and immediately struck a chord with readers. Torkan continues to win new generations of readers; something which Flectcher believes is attributable to the character's enduring appeal. Flectcher claims that "the paradigm for heroic adventure was first written in the Bible, as David and Goliath. Whether it's in Arthurian legend or Harry Potter, the paradigm itself doesn't change much – but fashions do change."

Levels of violence in the stories have, however, dropped since the strip's early years. John Ryan in his Australian comic anthology, Panel by Panel, describes Torkan's success as being due to the upsurge in demand for heoric-fantasy stories created by Marvel Comics' adaptation of Robert E. Howard's Conan the Barbarian.

Encouraged by the success of Torkan, Fletcher began work on his next comic strip idea in 1977—a science-fiction series called Staria.

She may be a curvaceous blonde beauty, but Staria is no bimbo. As Captain of the Federation of Intergalactic Peace Keeping Organisation (FIPKO) patrol vessel Venus III, Staria and her crew roam the galaxies, fighting evil and protecting the innocent. Fletcher created his protagonist by taking the common sci-fi stereotypes—the hunky hero, the bimbo and the professorial type—and turned the bimbo into the hero, turned the hunk into a bird-headed Dromad named Kru (the ship's flight engineer) and made the professor into a drunk, Dr. Umbo.

Still working full-time while producing the weekly Torkan strip, it took Roger several years to develop Staria and eventually sell it.

"I started showing Staria around in 1977, but I was assured that sci-fi was dead as last week's prawn heads. Then along came Star Wars in 1977, and the pundits were proved wrong – as pundits often are."

The success of Star Wars may have made it easier to sell Staria, but it was three years before the strip first appeared in Sydney's Daily Telegraph newspaper in 1980.

Like Torkan, Fletcher believes Staria's continued popularity stems from her well-defined character.

"She is a strong and courageous woman, while still have a nurturing side – she's a bit of a mother hen about her crew," he says. "I started off with a tongue-on-cheek writing style, so the character hasn't changed a great deal."

Fletcher prefers the freedom of the Sunday format, which allows for more flexibility in drawing than the daily strip, but stories must be strong so that readers can remember them a week later.

Fletcher continues to write his strips today. Sydney film company Prodigy Movies is developing projects featuring both of Fletcher's characters.

Fletcher has won 'Best Adventure /Illustrated Strip Artist' twice (1998 & 1990) and has been a nominee fourteen times at the Australian Cartoonists' Association's Stanley Awards. In 1999 he was awarded the "Jim Russell Award" for his contribution to Media Art in Australia.
