= Suzanne White =

American professor, debate coach, and TikToker

Suzanne Lynn White (née Lumberg) is an American professor, debate coach, and TikToker.

== Early life and education ==
White is the daughter of Dawn and Kevin Lumberg. She attended Woodbury High School. In 2011, she earned a bachelor of arts degree from Minnesota State University, Mankato and in 2013 earned a master's degree in communications from Illinois State University.

== Personal life ==
White is married to Dillon White. The pair met in 2009 and were married in 2013. White first saw Dillon at a competitive speech and debate tournament while they were both in college and a mutual friend introduced them. When she tripped while walking on their first date in Chicago, White looked up at Dillon while on the ground and said, "Well, this is me, take it or leave it."

During the COVID-19 pandemic, White and her family moved across country in an RV, from Minnesota to Texas, and then back again. White and Dillion have four children.

== Career ==
White is a professor at a community college.

In 2020, White and her husband joined the faculty of Saint Mary's Hall in San Antonio, Texas; White was the upper school's speech and drama teacher while Dillon served as the debate teacher. Previously, she was a tenured communication professor at Normandale Community College. In 2019, while at Normandale, she was named the Minnesota Board of Trustees’ Outstanding Educator. Neither Dillon nor Suzanne White are currently on the Saint Mary's Hall published list of faculty and staff.

White and her husband served as the co-head coaches of the Woodbury High School Speech and Debate Team. In that role, she was named the 2017-2018 Minnesota Coach of the Year. From 2011 to 2013, she was an ad-hoc coach of the Forensics Union at Illinois State University.

== TikTok ==
White initially did not want to join TikTok. She signed up in 2020, after her husband began posting videos, in order to troll him. White and her husband do not show their children in their videos. As of November 2024, she has 1.4 million followers on TikTok.
