= Alan Moir =

Australian caricaturist and cartoonist (born 1947)

Alan Moir (born 1945) is an Australian caricaturist and cartoonist who was born in Hāwera, New Zealand. He has been the Editorial Cartoonist for the Sydney Morning Herald since 1984, and previously The Bulletin and Brisbane's Courier-Mail. His work on international events is also syndicated regularly through The New York Times Syndicate.

Alan's credits include being six-time winner of "Australian Editorial Cartoonist of the Year", a Churchill Fellowship in 1999, Walkley award for Political Cartooning in 2000 and 2006. He also won the Gold Stanley award in 1985. He was runner up in the United Nations Correspondents Association Ranan Lurie Political Cartoon Award in 2004.

Inducted into "The Australian Cartoonists' Hall of Fame" 2018.

In 2019 a cartoon on global warming was published in "The Oxford Illustrated History of the World"

His work is held in several collections including the National Library of Australia, the National Museum of Australia, the National Library of New Zealand, the State Library of New South Wales, the State Library of Queensland, the State Library of Victoria, and the Private Collection of Kofi Annan (the former Secretary- General of the UN).

In 2006 during the aftermath of the Danish Prophet cartoon controversy, he was invited to the Australian Senate to give a lecture on the history of political cartooning. He has published about a dozen books of cartoons over the years, and has been included in many others. He has given talks on the History of Western Political Cartooning in Sydney and Canberra, NZ (Auckland and Wellington), India (New Delhi, Trivandrum, Kochi)
