= Rolf Heimann =

Australian author, cartoonist and illustrator

- Born: 9 May 1940 (age 86); Dresden, Germany
- Occupations: Author, cartoonist, illustrator
- Writing career
- Notable work: 'Eagle Eyes' series
- Notable awards: Australian Cartoonist of the Year (2003, Stan Cross Awards)

Rolf Heimann (born 9 May 1940) is an Australian author, cartoonist and illustrator.

Heimann was born in Dresden, Germany, fled to the West in 1955 and migrated to Australia in 1959.

== Biography ==
He is the author of over thirty books, including novels, travel books, cartoon collections, but mainly of children's books, which have been translated into German, Danish, Spanish, and Chinese and have sold millions of copies worldwide.

In 1974 Heimann skippered La Flor (renamed Greenpeace IV for the voyage) from Melbourne, Australia, to Mururoa via New Zealand but arrived after the final nuclear test for the year.

Heimann has been cartooning since the mid-seventies and is a member of the Australian Black and White (cartoonists) Association. He has contributed cartoons to numerous publications in Australia and overseas. Among his most popular works are the 'Eagle Eyes' series of books published in the late 1980s and early 1990s.

== Awards and recognitions ==
He was named Australian Cartoonist of the Year at the 19th annual Stan Cross Awards in 2003, for cartooning excellence.

Heimann is married, with two children, and has lived in Melbourne, Australia.
