= Max Whitehead =

Australian rugby league footballer

Personal information
- Full name: Colin Maxwell Whitehead
- Born: 2 August 1922; Riverstone, New South Wales, Australia
- Died: 26 March 2010 (aged 87); Collaroy, New South Wales, Australia

Playing information
- Position: Prop
Club
Years	Team	Pld	T	G	FG	P
1942–46	North Sydney	13	0	1	0	2
1947–48	Manly-Warringah	20	4	0	0	12
	Total	33	4	1	0	14

Colin Maxwell Whitehead (2 August 1922 – 26 March 2010) was an Australian professional rugby league footballer who played in the 1940s.

== Early years ==
Whitehead grew up in Park Street, Narrabeen, New South Wales.

== Rugby league career ==
He started playing rugby league in 1935 for the Narrabeen Sharks juniors. He also played for North Sydney for three seasons, in 1942, 1943 and 1946. While with for the North Sydney club he played in their grand final loss to Newtown in the 1943 NSWRFL season, playing under captain-coach Frank Hyde.

Whitehead was the first captain of the Manly-Warringah Sea Eagles in their debut season of 1947 and also played the 1948 season. He was one of a number of players that Manly acquired from North Sydney to join the NSWRFL in 1947, which also included Johnny Bliss. He played 20 first grade games for Manly-Warringah and scored 4 tries during his 2 years in first grade.

== Male model, international wrestler and life guard ==
He enlisted in the RAAF in 1943, but was never sent overseas and was discharged at the end of that year. Aside from his rugby league career, he had been at various times a male model, a pilot, a chicken sexer, and a professional wrestler.

As a wrestler, using the name Max Steyne, he won the 1954 European Heavyweight Championship in Munich, Germany.

In the 1940s, 1950s and 1960s Whitehead was widely known for being the first Chesty Bond character in Bonds singlet advertisements nationally.

He was also a professional lifeguard at Manly Life Saving Club for many years, and won many surfing events for South Narrabeen, Manly & North Steyne Surf Clubs, specializing in belt races.

Whitehead lived his final years at the War Veterans Home at Collaroy, New South Wales. He died on 26 March 2010 from complications of hip surgery at age 87. Whitehead's ashes were scattered on Brookvale Oval before a match between Manly and the Cronulla-Sutherland Sharks on 11 April 2010.
