= George Finey =

Australian artist

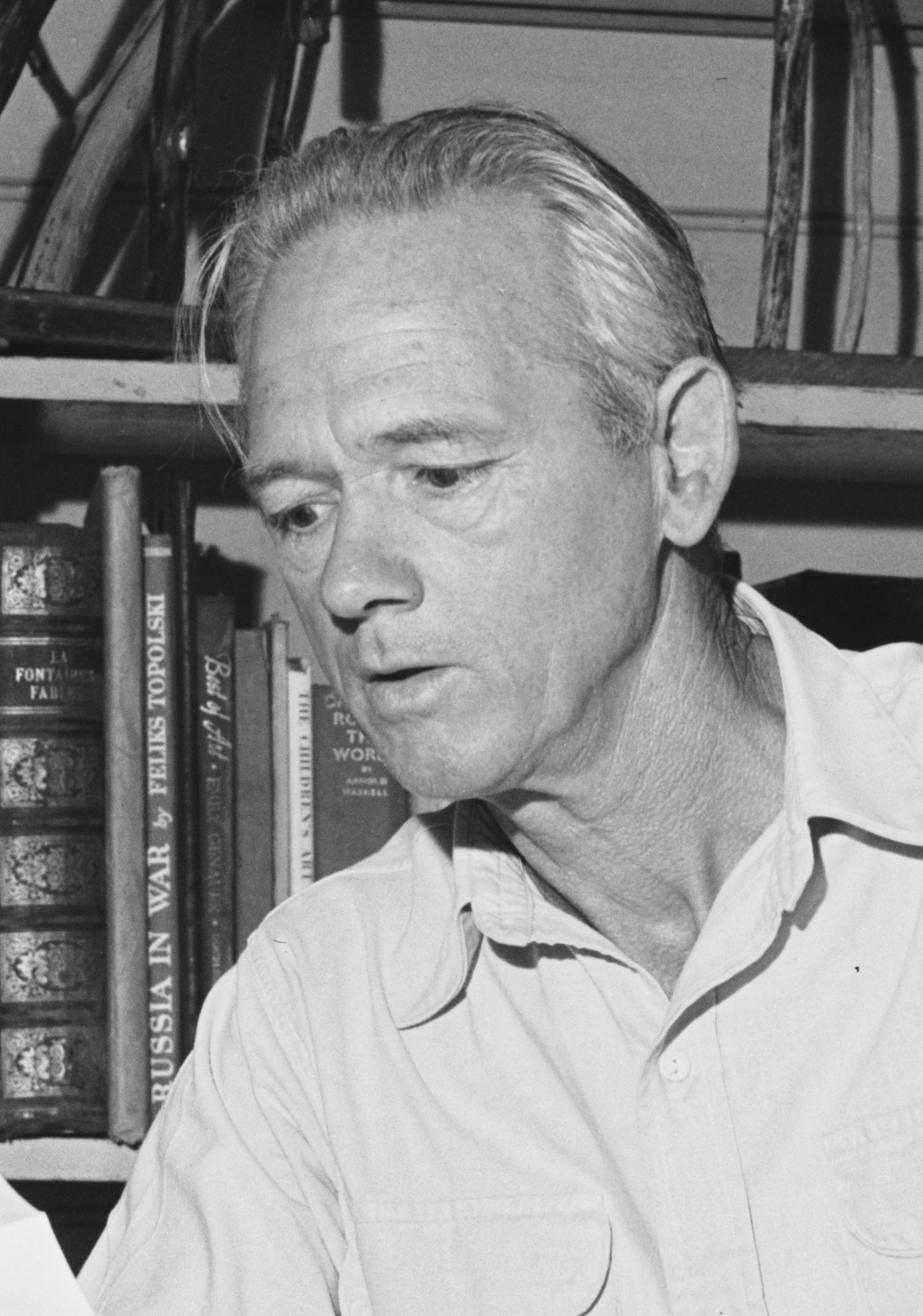
- George Finey in 1950.
- Born: George Edmond Finey; 16 March 1895; Parnell, New Zealand
- Died: 8 June 1987 (aged 92)
- Education: Elam School of Art; Regent Street Polytechnic (School of Art)
- Occupations: Artist, caricaturist, cartoonist, illustrator, painter

Signature
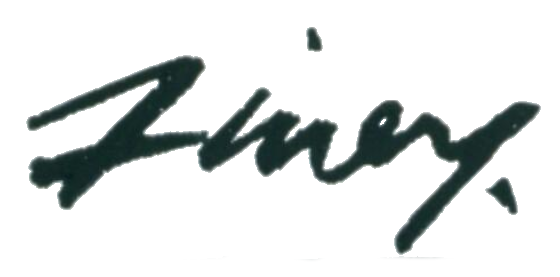

George Edmond Finey (16 March 1895 – 8 June 1987) was an Australian illustrator, cartoonist and caricaturist. Born in New Zealand, he was most active as a black-and-white artist in Sydney from 1920 to the mid-1940s, during which time he worked for Smith's Weekly, the Labor Daily, the Daily Telegraph and other newspapers and publications. The left-wing pacifist and humanist viewpoint in his political cartoons were the subject of criticism and censure from both the left and right during his career, but Finey remained uncompromising in his political views.

During his period with Smith's Weekly in the 1920s Finey developed outstanding skills as a caricaturist, a category of his art practice for which he was especially admired in his lifetime. The journal Art in Australia dedicated an entire issue to his caricatures in June 1931. Finey moved to the Blue Mountains in 1942. In his later artistic career Finey was known for his expressionistic and mixed media paintings and sculpture.

== Biography ==
=== Early years ===
George Edmond Finey was born on 16 March 1895 in the Auckland suburb of Parnell, New Zealand, one of eleven children of English-born mariner, Solomon ('Harry') Finey, and his wife Rose Emily (née Newton).

By the time he was aged fourteen Finey began selling his drawings to local Auckland newspapers.

From 1912 to 1914, while working as an apprentice lithographer at the New Zealand Herald, Finey studied part-time at Auckland's Elam School of Art, sharing a studio with other artists (including Unk White).

=== War service ===
Finey enlisted in the New Zealand Army Service Corps on 25 August 1915. In November 1915 he travelled to Egypt with the 1st New Zealand Expeditionary Force (N.Z.E.F.), where he served as a driver in the Transport Corps. In April 1916 he embarked for France, where he served on the Western Front. Finey was wounded in 1917 and suffered burns from exposure to mustard gas.

Finey was promoted to sergeant in October 1918. After the Armistice Finey was attached to the New Zealand War Records office in London. He was hospitalised with influenza in January 1919 and transferred to the army's Education Department in April. During his deployment Finey was appointed an official war artist with the N.Z.E.F. During a period of leave Finey spent three months studying in the School of Art at the Regent Street Polytechnic in London. During that period he was influenced by the political caricatures in the German magazines Simplicissimus and Jugend. Finey was repatriated to New Zealand in August 1919, departing from England aboard the Tainui and arriving at Wellington on 21 September 1919.

Finey remained in his homeland for only a short time, finding no prospects for work and feeling constrained by the conformity of New Zealand society. He left for Sydney in November 1919.

=== Smith's Weekly ===
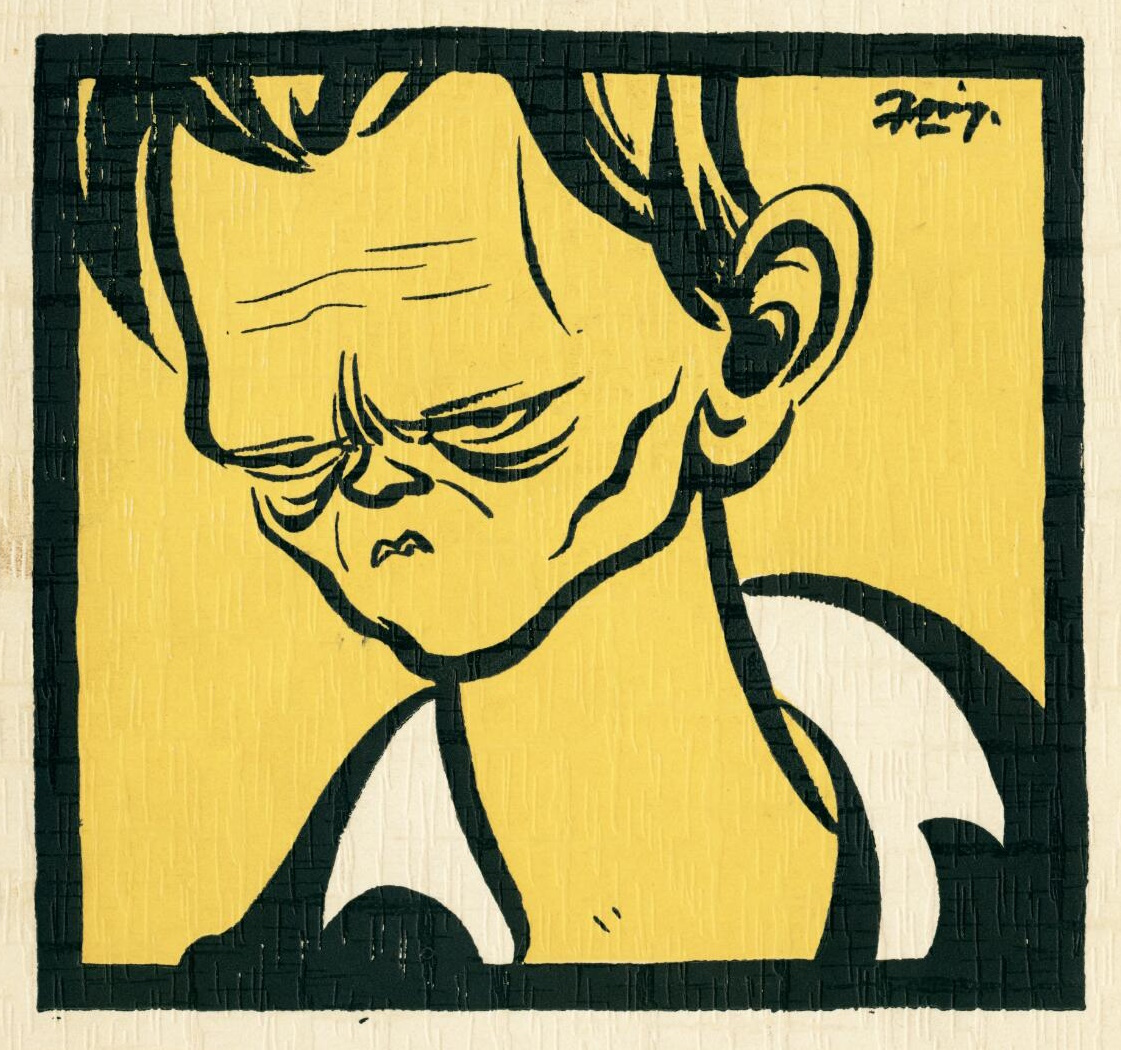
George Finey by George Finey, self-portrait caricature, published in Art in Australia, June 1931 (front cover).

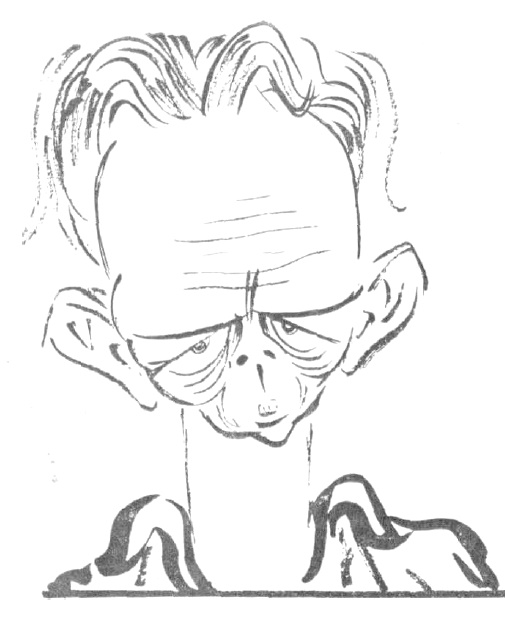
Caricature of George Finey by W. E. Pigeon, published in War Cartoons (1940).

After arriving in Sydney Finey had several of his cartoons accepted by The Bulletin magazine. His cartoons were included in the June 1920 issue of Aussie: The Cheerful Monthly. In July 1920 Finey's pencil and charcoal sketches, described as "vigorous" and "full of movement", were exhibited at the Sydney Art Society's students' show.

Drawings and cartoons by Finey began to regularly appear in Smith's Weekly from September 1920. By early in 1921 the art editor at Smith's Weekly, Alec Sass, agreed for him to became a staff artist, initially on a salary of nine pounds per week. In about February 1921 an agreement was signed under which Finey was employed "in the capacity of artist and cartoonist" on the staff of Smith's Weekly for five years from 1 March 1921 "and thereafter until the expiration of the agreement". Finey's early contributions to the newspaper were mainly joke cartoons.

After a mock ceremony performed by fellow-artist Percy Lindsay, George Finey and Nellie ('Nat') Phoebe Murray were married on 25 March 1922 at St. Clement's Anglican church in Mosman. The couple had seven children.

In September 1922 the first of a pair of Finey's characteristic caricatures began to be published in Smith's Weekly, in the 'Gossip from Here, There, and Everywhere' section of the newspaper. The first to be published, in the 25 September 1922 issue, were caricatures of William Brooks, a member of the New South Wales Legislative Council, and James Dooley, premier of New South Wales from October to December 1921.

In the words of Lionel Lindsay, under Finey's hand "the human countenance becomes elastic", adding: "Without truce or mercy he shapes it anew, yet preserves a curious memory of the original". George Blaikie, a Smith's Weekly journalist, described Finey as "a man of fearless spirit [who] would not be sway by hope of heaven or fear of hell from portraying people as he personally interpreted them". Finey's caricature of Daniel Mannix, the Catholic Archbishop of Melbourne and a controversial figure at the time, was published in March 1922, after deliberation by the Smith's Weekly newspaper owners. Blaikie wrote that Finey's "critical" caricature emphasised Mannix's "severe, ... intolerant and unhappy characteristics".

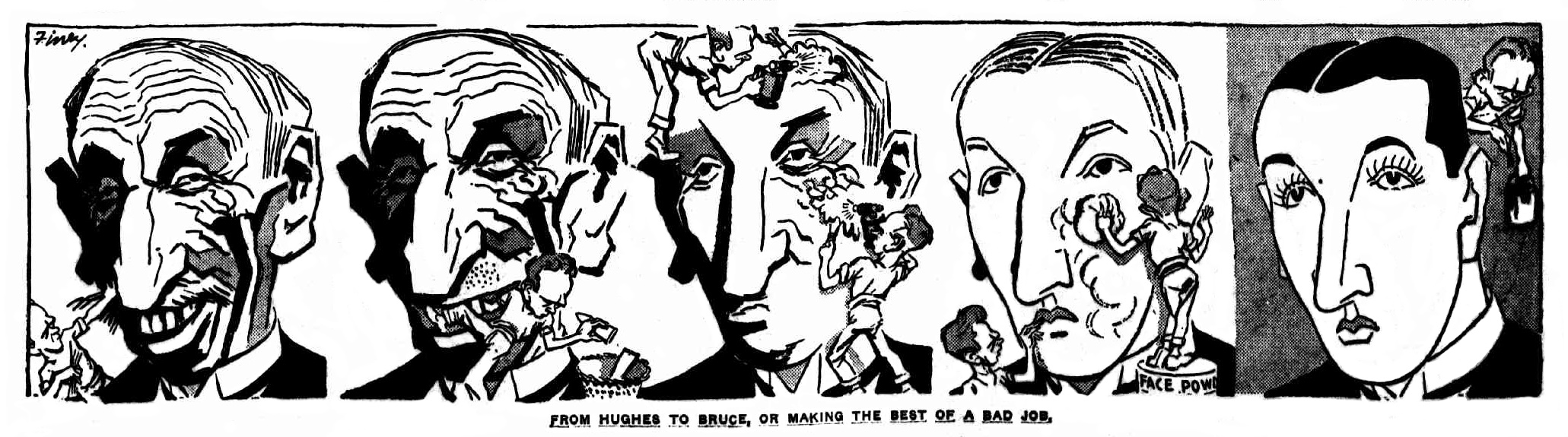
'From Hughes to Bruce, or Making the Best of a Bad Job', transformation caricatures by George Finey, published in Smith's Weekly, 17 February 1923.

In late 1922 Finey began a series of transformation caricatures, in comic strip format, showing the process to turning a face into a caricature, the remoulding of one face to another, or the reshaping of an object into a face. The first of these, 'A Caricaturist at Work', was published on 25 November 1922.

Finey was one of twenty-five foundation members of the Black and White Artists' Society, formed in July 1924, and was elected as a committee member. He remained prominent in its activities until shortly before he died. Fellow Smith's artist Stan Cross nominated Finey as "the greatest of Australia's newspaper artists". Blaikie remembered him as an unkempt sandal-wearing bohemian, fearlessly honest in his work, and notoriously generous.

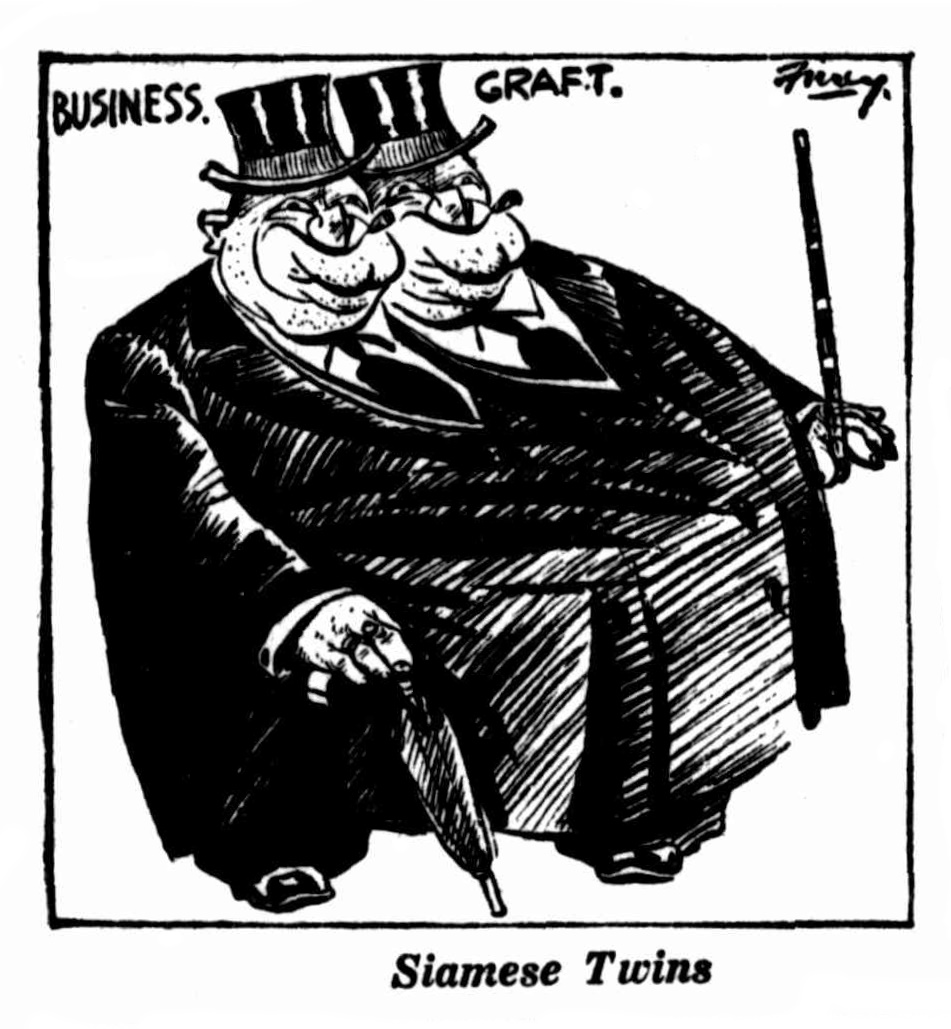
'Siamese Twins', published in Smith's Weekly, 21 July 1928.

In May 1925 Finey's employment contract was updated, whereby he was employed as an artist and cartoonist on the staff of Smith's Weekly and The Daily Guardian for the following five years.

In late November 1925 Finey and his fellow cartoonist, Lance Driffield, were served with an injunction by their employer, Smith's Newspapers Ltd., restraining them from proceeding with a planned selling exhibition of their artwork at Swain's Gallery in Sydney. Smith's Weekly claimed ownership of the original drawings, arguing that they had paid the cartoonists to draw them and also supplied the materials for them to do so. Finey countered that Smith's Weekly had acquired copyright of his artwork, but not ownership of the originals.

A hearing was commenced in the Equity Court in September 1926 before Justice Long Innes. On 1 October 1926 the terms of settlement of the case were announced, settled out of court due to Finey being unable to continue the case because of the costs. The terms represented a complete victory for Smith's Weekly. Finey was restrained from infringing the company's copyright in the works in question, or from selling or distributing them without the consent of the company. However Finey did "claim a pyrrhic victory", having established that ownership of the artwork rested with the artist if the value of the drawing was of great value than the materials used in producing it. Having run out of funds on the court case and with a young family at home, Finey was permitted to return to work at Smith's Weekly.

From July 1928 Finey's left-leaning political views began to be featured in Smith's Weekly, in regular features with a variety of titles such as 'Finey's Potted Comment on the Week' and 'The World Through Finey's Eye'. Finey's featured political cartoons continued through the early months of the Great Depression until about April 1930. Finey, who described his left-wing sympathies as "truthfulness", became known around the offices of Smith's Weekly as 'the Bolshie'.

=== Newspaper work ===
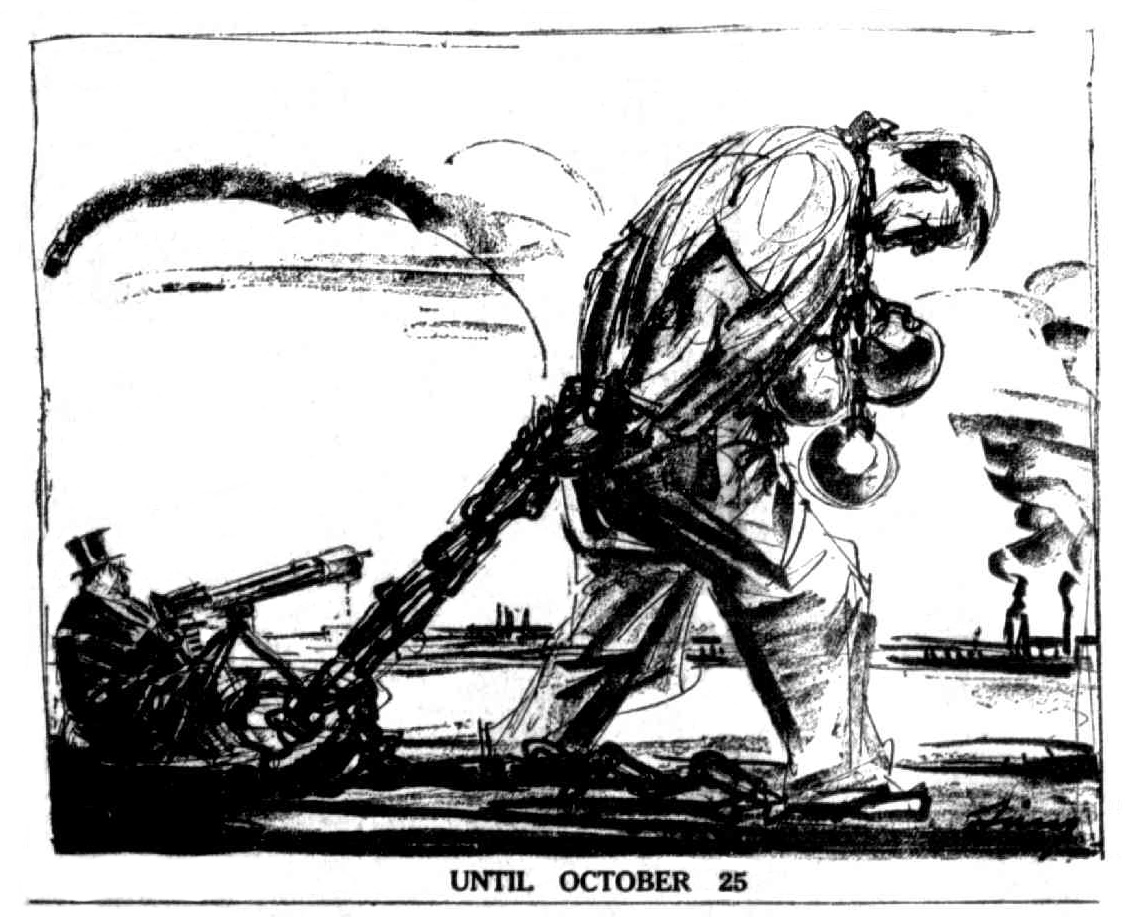
'Until October 25', a cartoon by George Finey anticipating the defeat of Bavin's Nationalist/Country Party coalition, published in the Labor Daily, 7 October 1930.

Finey had to forego a higher salary at Smith's Weekly when he went to work for the Labor Daily in September 1930. From mid-September 1930 Finey's uncompromising political cartoons were published on page one of many issues of The Labor Daily newspaper. He contributed a full-page poster, featuring a caricature of Nationist Party leader Thomas Bavin, published on the back page of The Labor Daily for its 20 October 1930 issue, five days before the New South Wales state election which was won by the Labor party with Jack Lang becoming premier of the state. Finey's cartoons continued to be published by the Labor Daily until 10 January 1931, reportedly being dropped from the newspaper because of the cartoonist's antagonism towards Jack Lang. One account of the reason for his early dismissal was that Finey wrote to Jack Lang when the "main plank of the Labor Party's policy – the socialisation of industry – was going to be introduced". Lang's reply, via his Secretary, was: "On account of the reorganisation of staff your services are no longer required".

At about this time Finey also contributed cartoons to The Red Leader newspaper. By late 1931 Finey's cartoons and caricatures were once again being published in the Labor Daily. Caricatures of sportsmen by Finey were published in the newspaper in November and December 1931.

Finey was the first president of the Workers' Art Club, established in August 1932, where he conducted art classes. The club was initially located in an annex of the Sydney School of Arts, but soon afterwards moved to larger premises at 36 Pitt Street. In November 1932 an exhibition of George Finey's drawings, political cartoons and caricatures was held at the Workers' Art Club rooms. In a review of Finey's exhibition the writer for Workers' Weekly, official newspaper of the Communist Party of Australia, condemned his cartoons as "defeatist propaganda". Finey's illustration 'Workers lined up for the dole' was described as depicting the workers "as miserable, spiritless derelicts, without a ray of hope". In contrast, the writer declared that "a proletarian artist" should show "the determination of the workers to fight back", adding: "Every stroke of his brush should be defiant, aimed to stir the masses to revolt... for better conditions". Finey's response was that graphic art should reflect the realism of the situation. Disagreements with the Communist Party and the management committee of the Workers' Art Club led to his resignation from the latter organisation.

In about February 1933 Finey was suspended as a staff-member of the Labor Daily, for the reason that he supplied a cartoon used in a leaflet attacking the newspaper.

In April 1933 Finey began teaching art classes at the People's Art Club, located above a nightclub at 147A King Street. The club later staged several plays, but had a short life.

From November 1934 to January 1935 cartoons by Finey began to be published in Sydney's Truth newspaper, in a semi-regular feature called 'Cartoon Kaleidoscope of the Week'. Throughout 1935 to about October Finey's caricatures were featured in Truth.

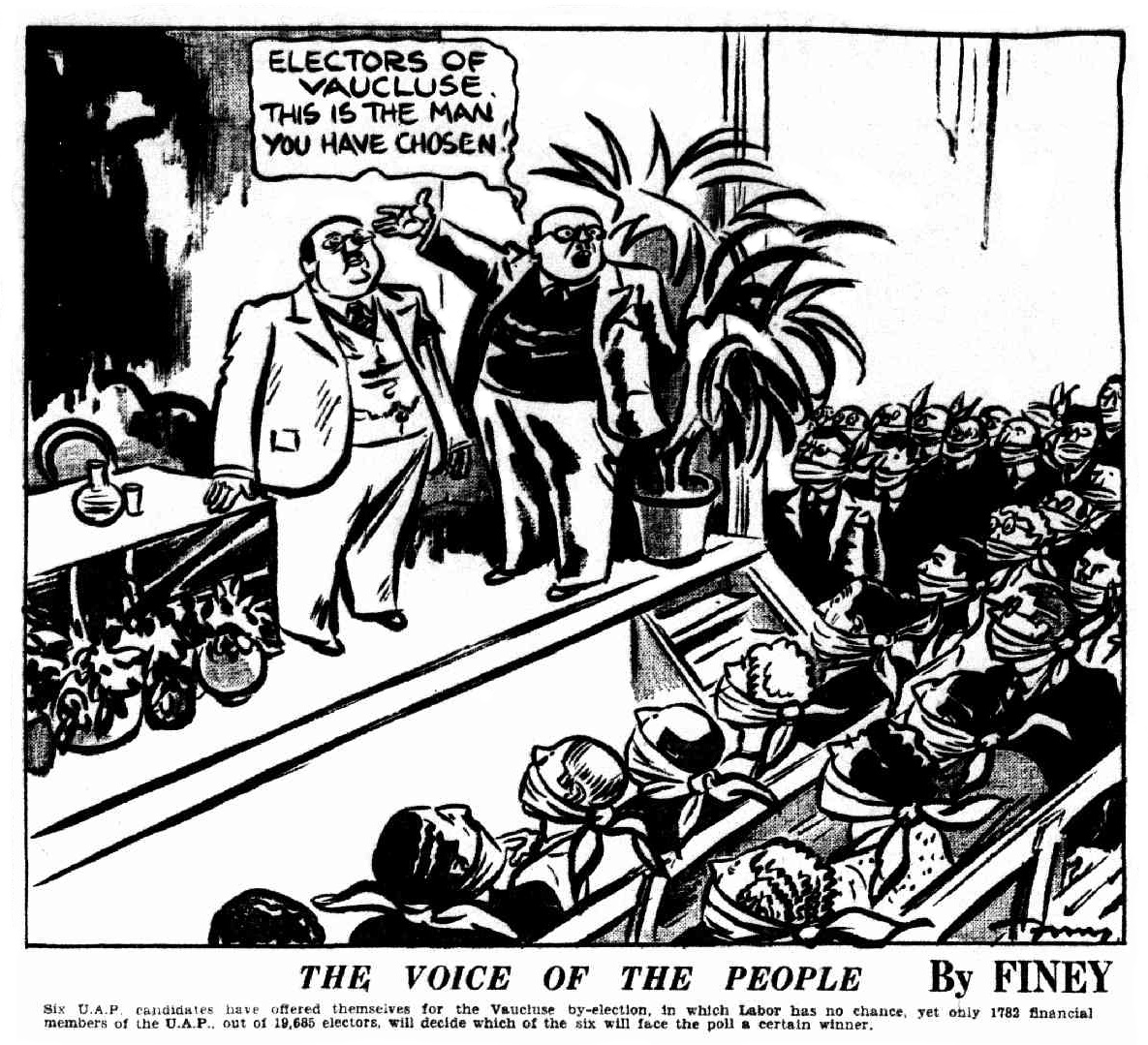
'The Voice of the People', published in the Daily Telegraph, 11 August 1936.

From March 1936 Finey's illustrations were published in Sydney's the Daily Telegraph, a mix of humorous and political cartoons and caricatures. In June 1940 the Daily News was acquired by Consolidated Press Ltd. and incorporated in the Daily Telegraph in July, with many of the Daily News staff joining the Daily Telegraph, including the cartoonist Will Mahony.^{[A]} In December 1940 a volume of cartoons by three artists employed by the Daily Telegraph – Finey, Will Mahony and W. E. Pidgeon ('Wep') – was published. The 48-page collection titled War Cartoons were made of cartoons relating to the war in Europe.

In about 1942 Finey and his family left their home at Brookvale, in northern Sydney, to live at Springwood in the Blue Mountains.

In early November 1944 Will Mahony, Finey's fellow cartoonist at the Daily Telegraph, refused to sign his name to a cartoon critical of trade unions, which he considered "were based upon the Telegraph proprietors' anti-Labor prejudices and not upon truth". As a result of his stand Mahony was told by the editor, Brian Penton, that he should seek other employment and dismissed as a staff-member. Penton then requested that George Finey produce a cartoon critical of striking coal miners. Finey refused, telling the editor he had "moral objections" to doing so, and he too was sacked (or resigned) from the newspaper.

In the mid- to late 1940s Finey produced illustrations for communist publications including Len Fox's booklet Wealthy Men, published in 1946, and the Tribune newspaper.

Finey contributed to the school magazine of the Springwood Public School, Bran Pie, published in December 1946. His contribution consisted of caricatures of the school captains, Betty Tuckey and Ian Russell. Illustrations by Finey appeared in the School Magazine (in the issues of June, August and September 1947), published by the New South Wales Department of Education.

In 1949 Finey was described as having "sun-tanned skin, vivid, alert hazel eyes, and shock of hair", with a preference for casual clothing, "open-necked sports shirt, slacks, and open-toed sandals".

Finey returned to work for the Daily Telegraph in the period 1953 to 1956. After his stint on the Daily Telegraph in the mid-1950s Finey worked as an ironworker installing a diesel engine on the Manly ferry, but after injuring his hand he focussed his attention on painting at his home in Springwood.

=== Later art-works ===
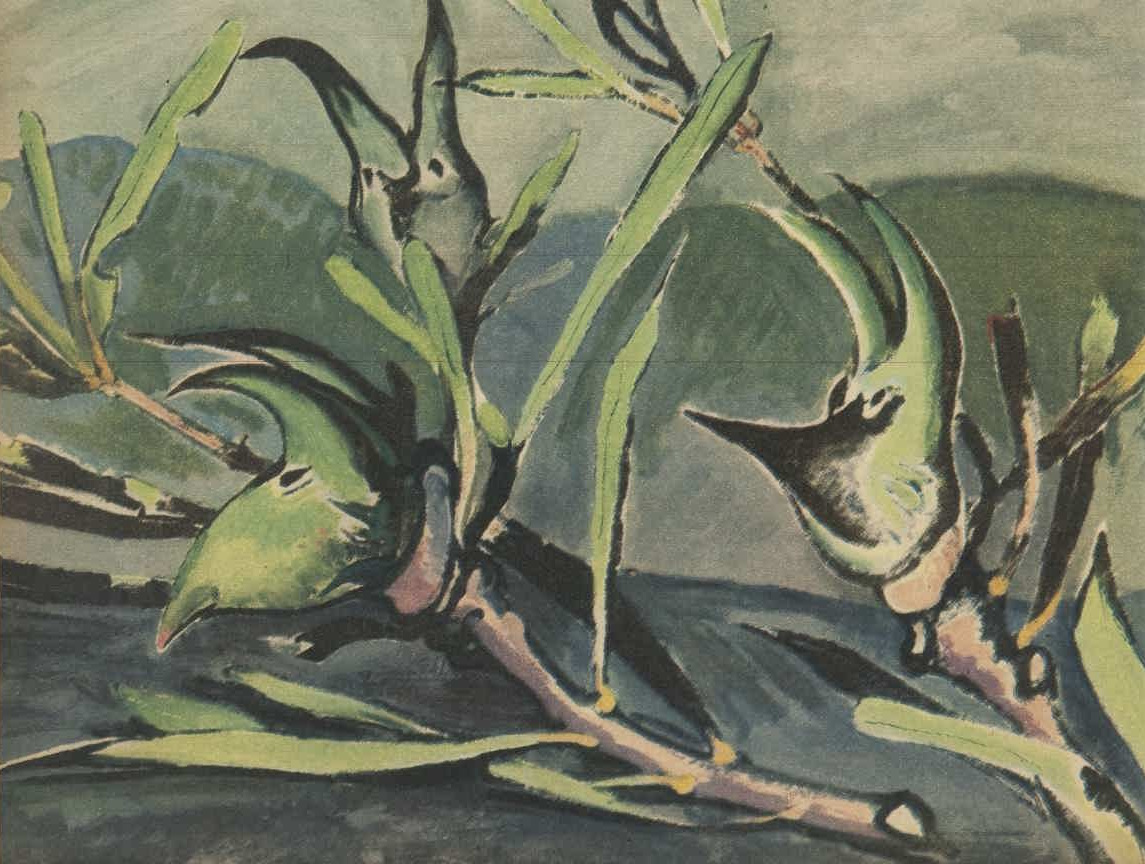
'Mountain Devils' (1949) by George Finey, published in Australian Women's Weekly, 3 December 1949.

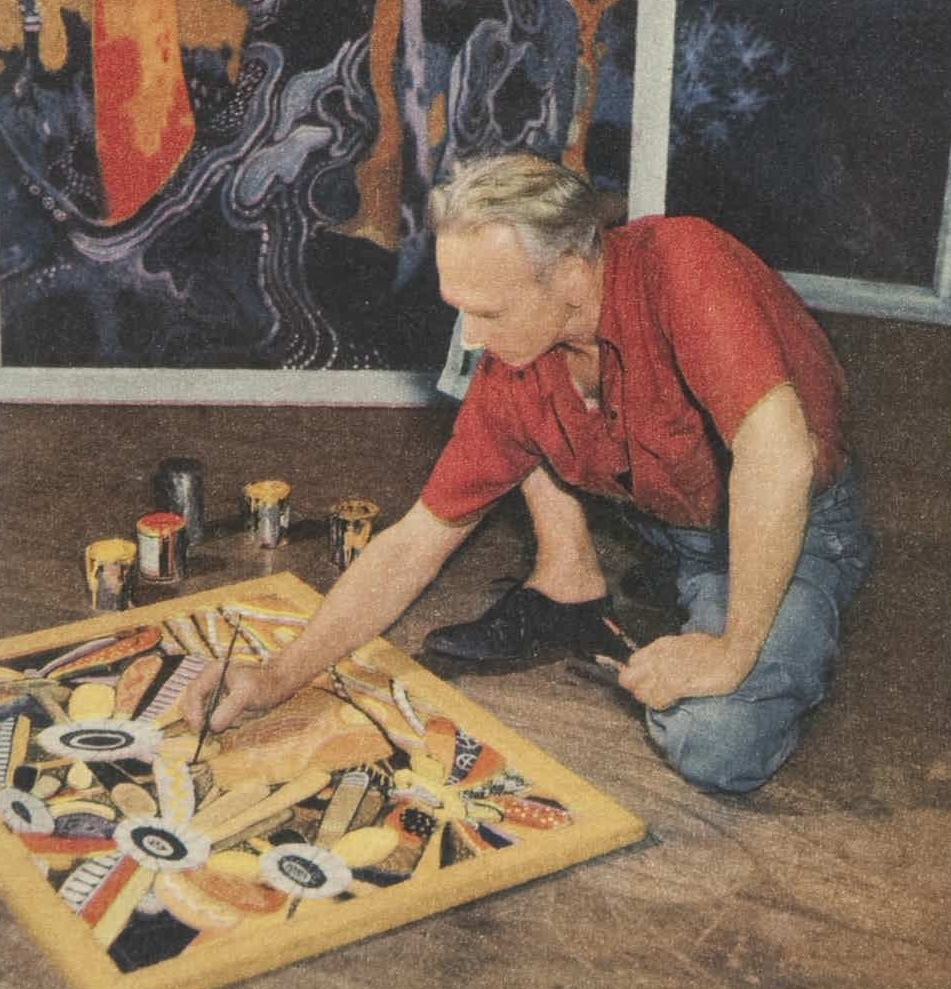
George Finey at work, published in Australian Woman's Weekly, 7 April 1951.

By the mid-1930s Finey had embraced collage and assemblage as an additional means of artistic expression, expressing through experimentation what he considered to be essential to the vitality of art. In January 1937 he held an exhibition of his cartoons, caricatures and enamel paintings incorporating mixed media at the David Jones' gallery in George Street, Sydney. Of the artworks on show, it was Finey's modernist mixed media paintings that received the most attention. 'The Milky Way' was described as "across a sky of deep blue a great wave of white and coloured lacquer swirls and foams", in which are "imbedded a host of coloured marbles, representing stars and planets". 'Chemical Warfare', framed in barbed wire, was described as "a vivid lacquer painting of the world falling in flames through a fiery sky", with painted sky and flames and a charred student's globe representing the world.

By the 1940s he was constructing 'junk sculptures' and collages in addition to his more accessible caricatures and black and white illustrations. In 1970 an art critic wrote about Finey constantly creating "out of waste, scrap and natural materials", using "rags, twine, shells, clay and stumps taken from the bush". The writer added: "He has made a whole series out of rolled-up, varnished newspapers, and he is adding to his History of Music with portraits of composers done in plastic foam, etched out with fine sandpaper".

In 1951 an exhibition of Finey's paintings was held in New York, a collection that included flower paintings and "imaginative compositions". An article about the upcoming exhibition commented: "Fellow artists and critics acknowledge Finey's skill, but differ on whether his work will endure as art". From Finey's perspective, "certain that his novel approach is valid, [he] throws his exuberant and imaginative personality into his creative work, allowing only a minimum of time for bread-and-butter jobs".

In September 1952 Finey exhibited a collection of his artworks in Tokyo, organised by the Japan-Australia-New Zealand Society, the first Australian artist to stage a one-man show in Japan.

In 1962 art-works by Finey were exhibited at the Qantas House gallery in London. The collection, made up of paintings, sculptures, ceramics, and enamel paintings, was titled "A History of Music – according to George Finey".

In 1978 a retrospective exhibition of Finey's art on musical themes opened at the Sydney Opera House. Finey was described as "the last of the great bohemians" and the majority of the works were portraits or relief sculptures, using a wide variety of materials. The exhibition included a free-standing sculpture titled 'Corroboree' which incorporated broken beer bottles with Aboriginal totems.

=== Last years ===
From the late 1970s until his death in 1987 Finey lived in a modest cottage at Lawson in the Blue Mountains after his house at Springwood was demolished for highway construction.

Finey's autobiography The Mangle Wheel: My Life was published in 1981 by Kangaroo Press.

In 1985 the Blue Mountains Community Arts Council mounted a retrospective exhibition of Finey's work, to mark his ninetieth birthday.

George Finey died on 8 June 1987, aged 92, at his home in Lawson on the eastern slopes of the Blue Mountains.

== Gallery ==
A selection of caricatures by George Finey
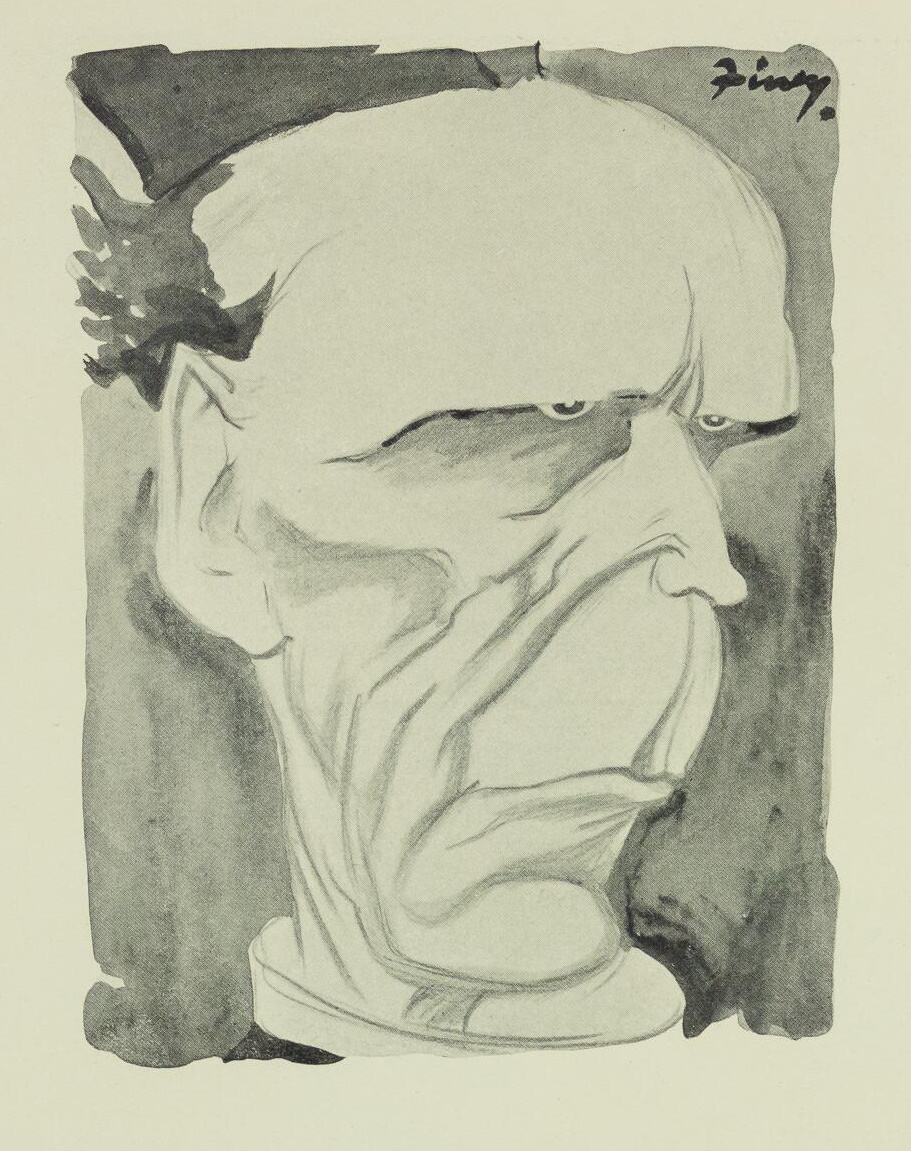
Caricature of Archbishop Daniel Mannix, published in Art in Australia (June 1924), first published in March 1922.

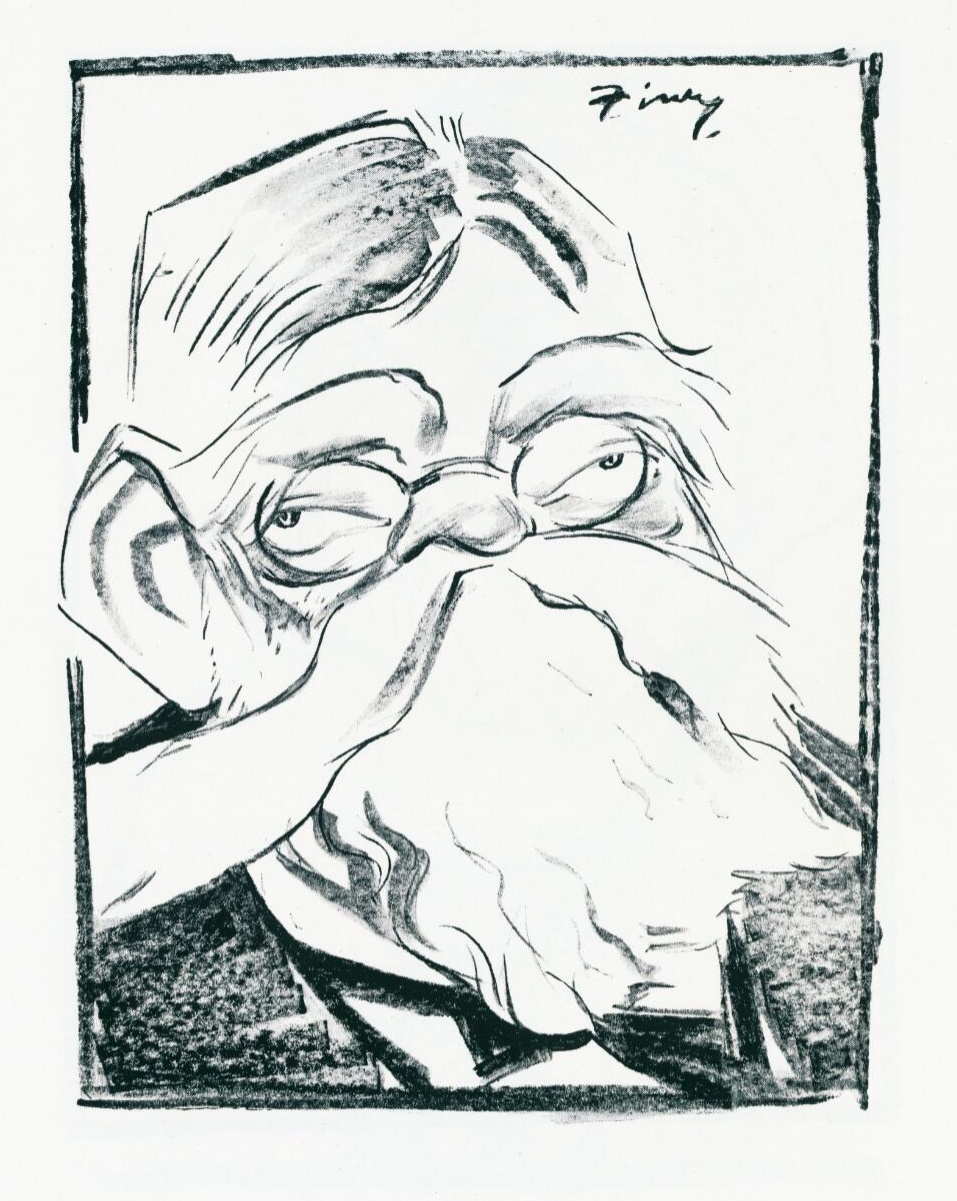
Caricature of Mungo MacCallum, Honorary Professor of English Literature at the University of Sydney, published in Art in Australia (June 1931), first published in October 1922.

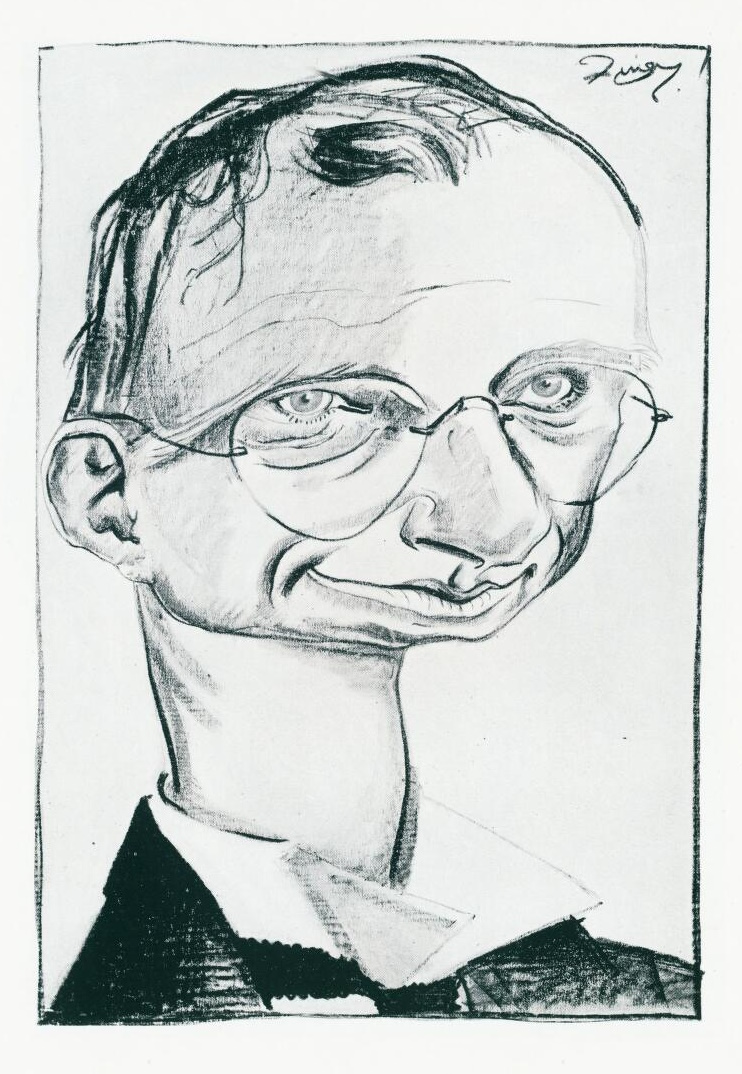
Edward Aloysius McTiernan MLA, published in Art in Australia (June 1931), first published in December 1923.

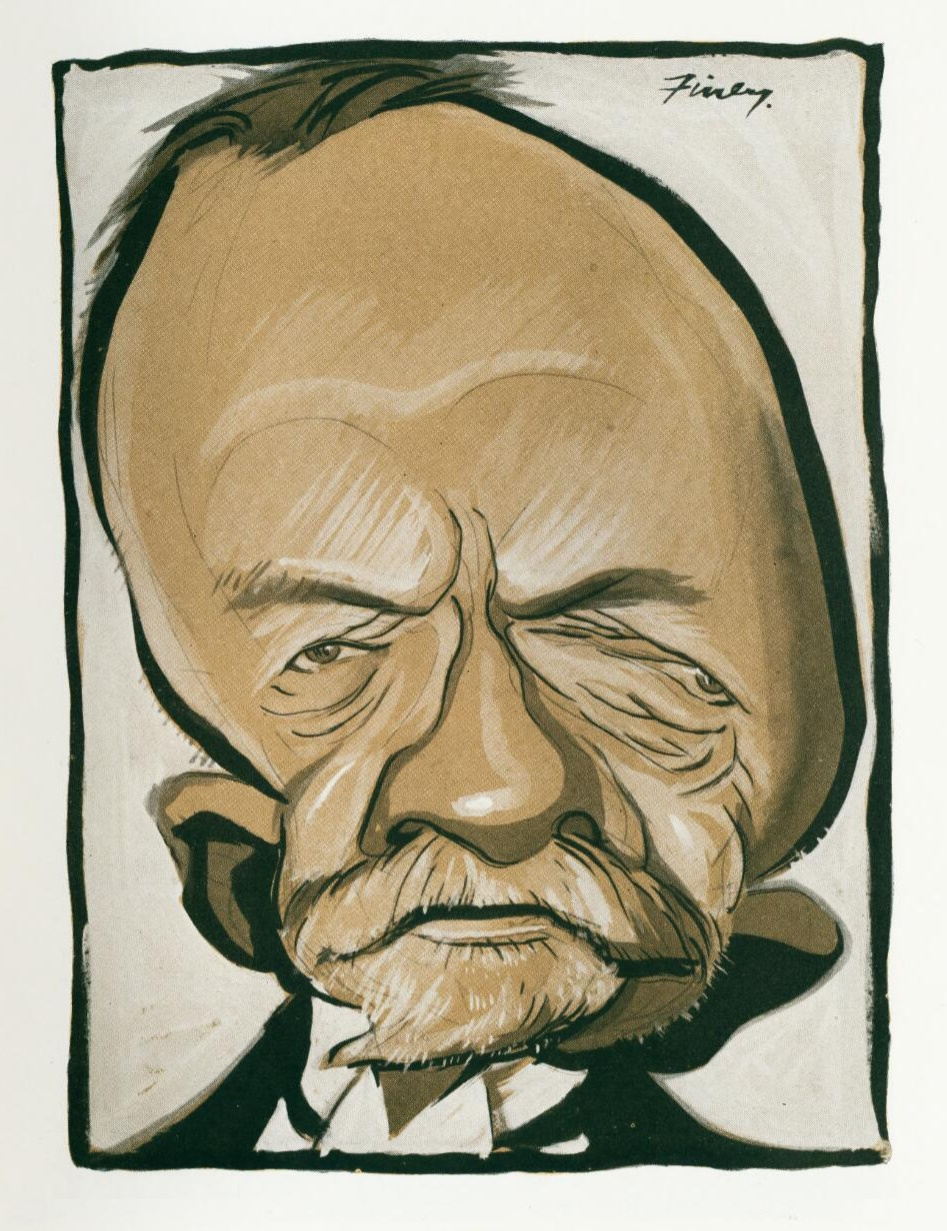
Caricature of R. Sanderson Taylor, editor of the Brisbane Courier, published in Art in Australia (June 1931), first published in December 1925.

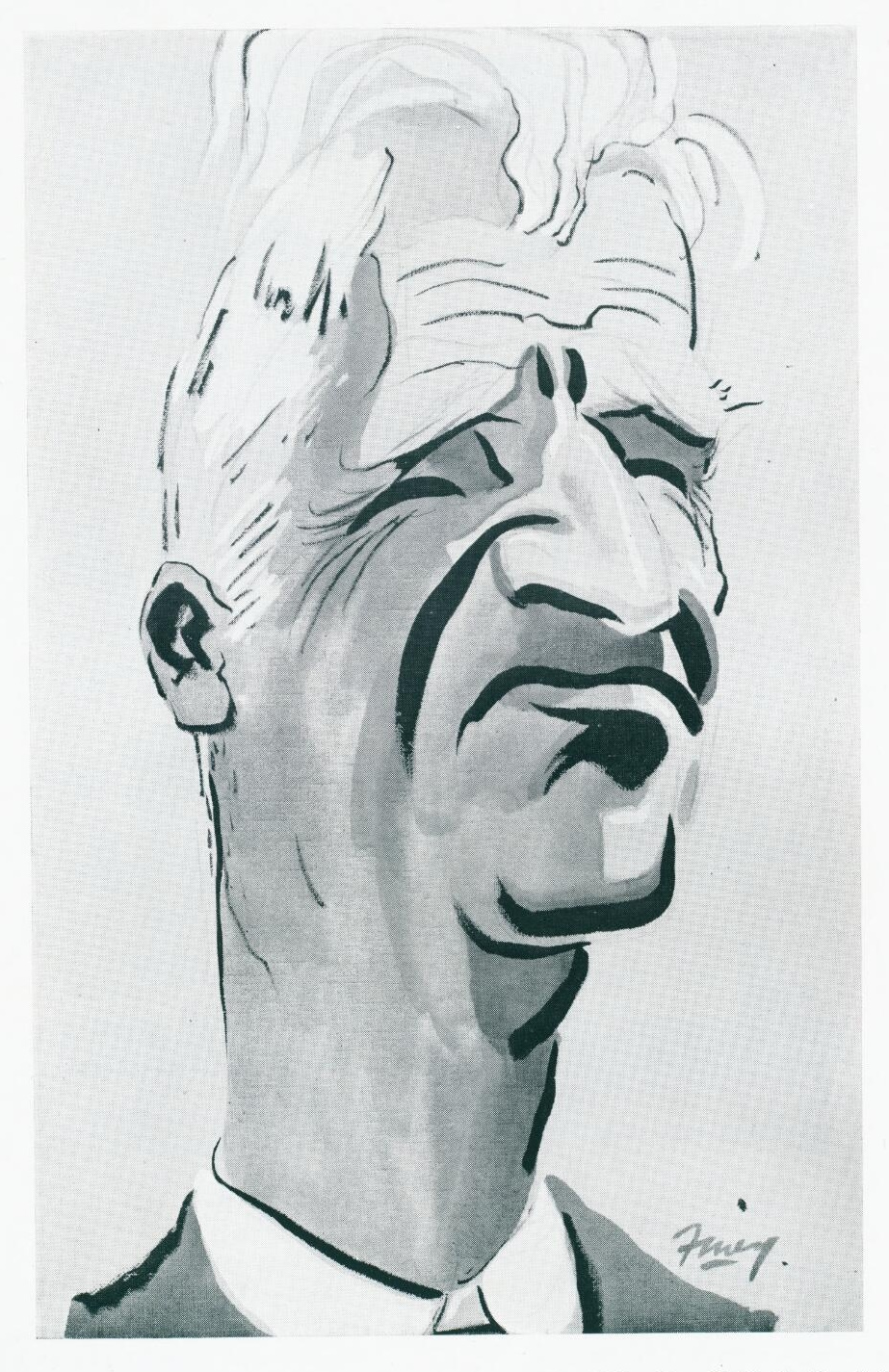
Caricature of James Scullin, Prime Minister of Australia 1929-1932, published in Art in Australia (June 1931).

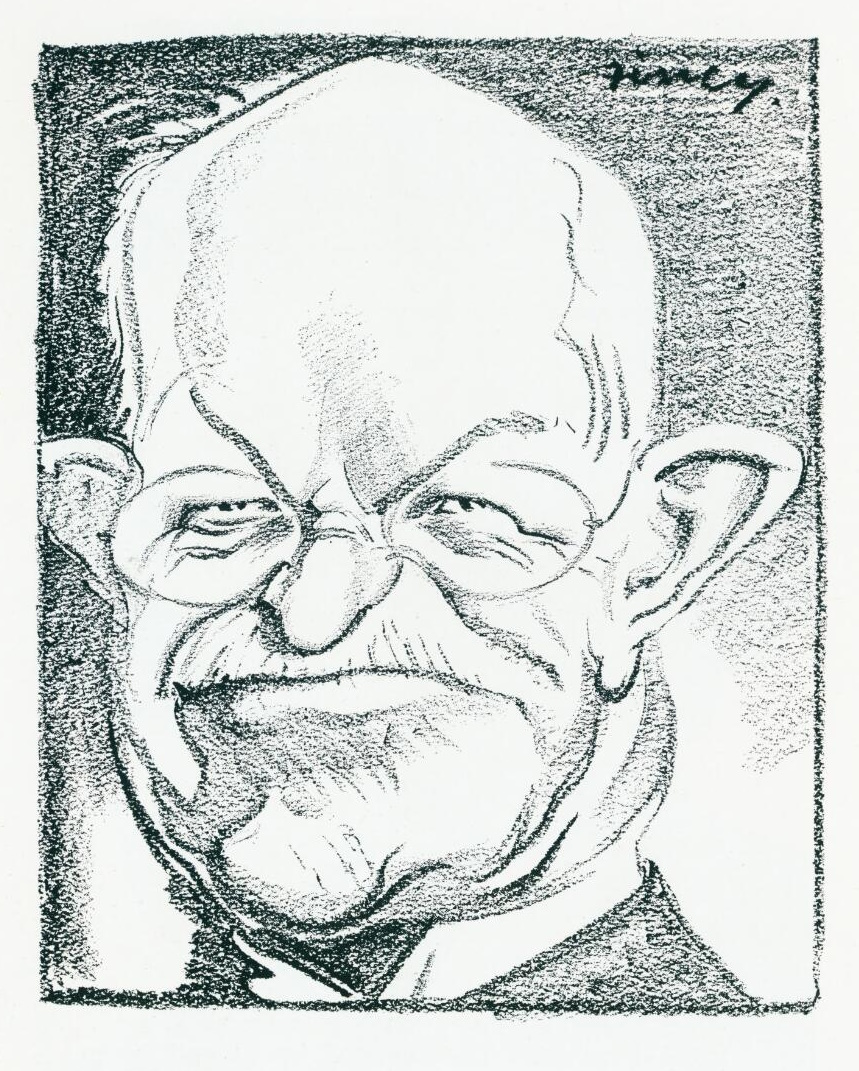
Caricature of C. W. Oakes, Colonial Secretary of New South Wales (1921, 1922-25), published in Art in Australia (June 1931).

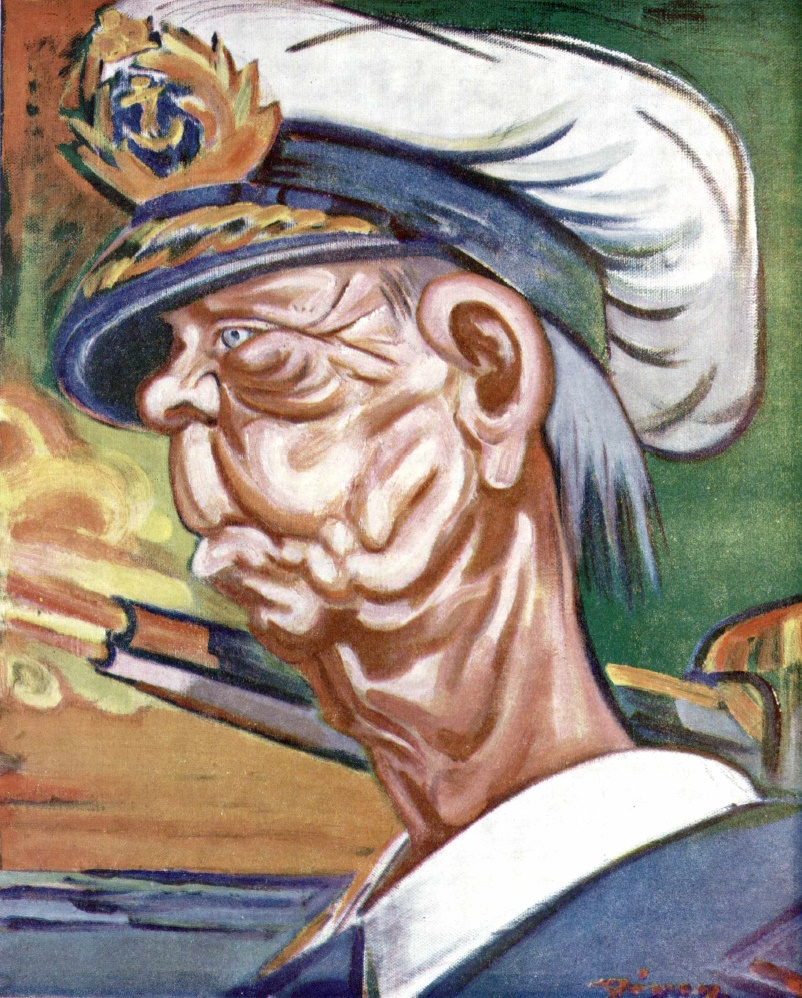
Caricature of Admiral Ragnar Colvin by George Finey, published in War Cartoons, December 1940.

== Publications ==
- Book of Finey: Poems and Drawings, self-published, 1976.
- The Mangle Wheel: My Life, Kenthurst, N.S.W.: Kangaroo Press, 1981.

== Awards ==
- Bathurst Prize for watercolour 1959

== Notes ==
A.In December 1938 The Labor Daily, the communication channel of the Australian Labor Party since 1922, changed its name to the Daily News whilst claiming there would be no change in editorial policy.
