= Will Mahony =

Australian artist

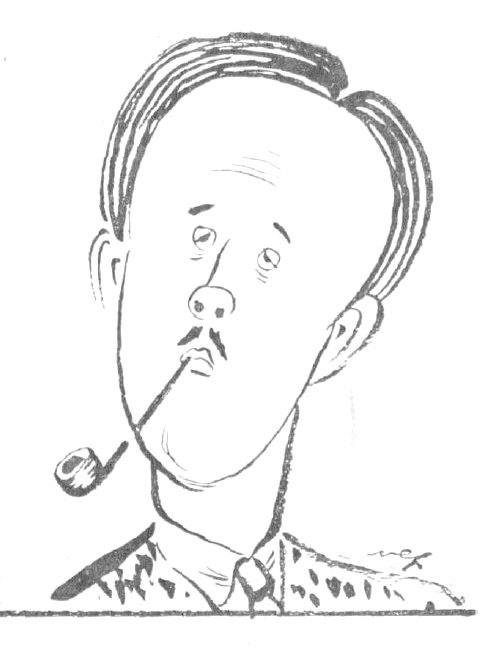
- Caricature of Will Mahony by W. E. Pidgeon ('Wep').
- Born: Francis William Mahony; 11 March 1905; London, England
- Died: 1 April 1989 (aged 84)
- Occupations: Artist, cartoonist, illustrator, painter, printmaker

Signature
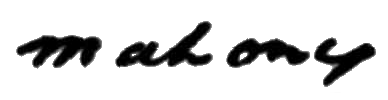

Francis William Mahony (11 March 1905 – 1 April 1989), professionally known as Will Mahony, was an Australian illustrator, cartoonist, caricaturist and printmaker. He was the son of the Australian artist Frank P. Mahony.

During the 1920s, Mahony mainly worked as a commercial artist and printmaker in Sydney. From the early 1930s, he began to produce political cartoons for various left-wing publications. For over seven years, from March 1933, Mahony's cartoons were a regular feature in The Labor Daily (later renamed the Daily News), the newspaper reflecting the views and policies of the Australian Labor Party. In June 1940, the newspaper was acquired by the Daily Telegraph, with most of the staff including Mahony being retained. In November 1944, Mahony was dismissed from the staff of the Daily Telegraph for refusing to put his name to a cartoon critical of trade unions.

In the post-war years, Mahony worked as an artist drawing comic strips and book illustrations.

== Biography ==
=== Early years ===
Francis William Mahony was born at Notting Hill in London on 11 March 1905, the son of the Australian artist Frank P. Mahony and his wife, Mary (née Tobin).

Mahony's father died of cancer in the Kensington Infirmary on 28 June 1916 and was buried at Hanwell in county Middlesex.

Will Mahony was brought to Australia as a child and educated in Sydney.

=== Art practice ===
Mahony began his working life as a cadet on Smith’s Weekly.

In the period 1922 to 1927, Mahony was employed as a commercial artist by the advertising firm of Smith and Julius Pty. Ltd. During this period, he contributed cartoons to Smith’s Weekly. In September 1927, a cartoon by Mahony was published in Sydney's The Sun newspaper.

In 1929, Mahony and another illustrator named Eyre were providing "humorous illustrations of stage and screen" for the publication The Australian Sporting and Dramatic News, a guide to "the best shows and pictures" in Sydney. The Australian Sporting and Dramatic News was established in August 1928 and ran until about April 1930, published by Australian United Press Ltd. (which also published Sydney's Evening News).

Francis ('Will') Mahony and Alice Parsonage were married in 1929 at Ryde.

In December 1929, Mahony was one of a group of artists represented in a collection of etchings, woodcuts and other printed artworks exhibited at W. Rubery Bennett's gallery in King Street. During the early 1930s, he continued to exhibit prints in exhibitions by the Society of Artists at the Education Department galleries.

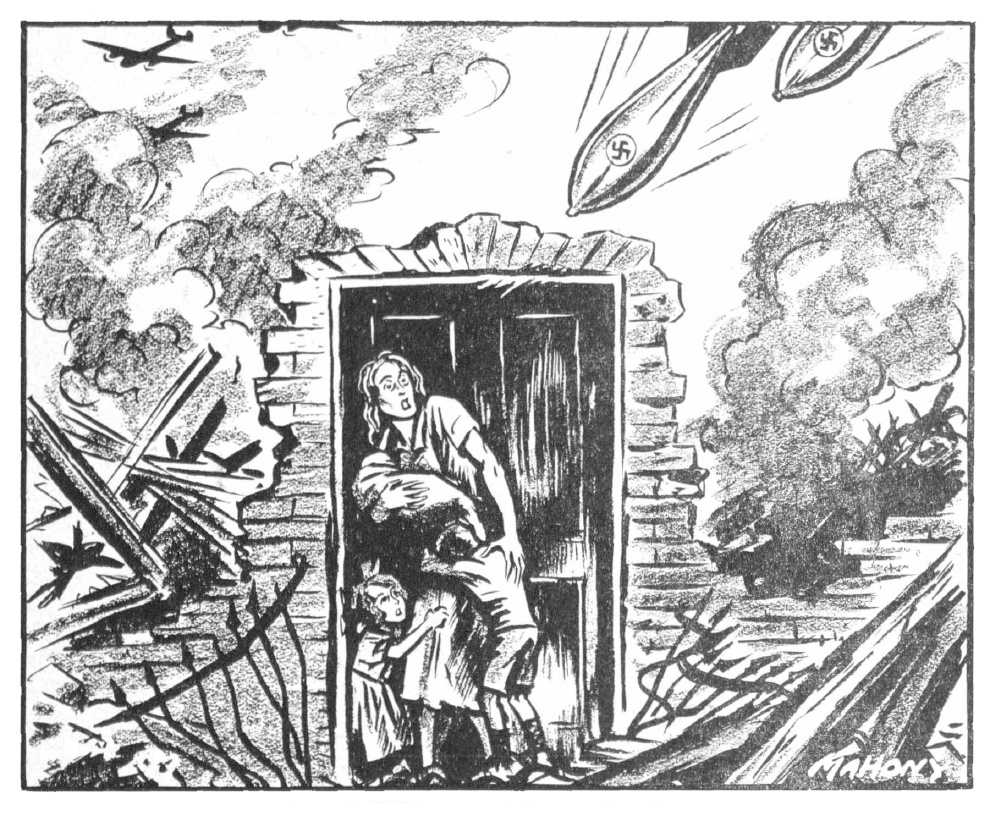
'Target Number One', first published in Daily Telegraph, 10 September 1940, page 6.

On 16 April 1930, Mahony's full page of cartoons 'An Artist's Impression of the Show' was published in The Sydney Mail.

=== Political cartoons ===
During 1932, Mahony produced cartoons for Sydney's The World newspaper (reprinted in Brisbane's The Daily Standard, a newspaper closely affiliated with the Queensland branch of the Australian Labor Party).

From late March 1933, Mahony's cartoons were regularly published in The Labor Daily, the newspaper reflecting the views and policies of the Australian Labor Party since 1922. He remained on the staff of The Labor Daily, with his political cartoons appearing frequently in its pages, until the newspaper changed its name to the Daily News in December 1938, after which Mahony remained as a staff artist under the new masthead.

By 1940, Mahony and his family were living at the Sydney suburb of Denistone.

In June 1940, the Daily News was acquired by Consolidated Press Ltd. and incorporated into the Daily Telegraph in July, with many of the Daily News staff joining the Daily Telegraph, including Mahony. In December 1940, a volume of cartoons by three artists employed by the Daily Telegraph – Mahony, George Finey and W. E. Pidgeon ('Wep') – was published. The 48-page collection titled War Cartoons comprised cartoons relating to the war in Europe.

In early November 1944, Mahony refused to sign his name to a cartoon critical of trade unions, which he considered "were based upon the Telegraph proprietors' anti-Labor prejudices and not upon truth". As a result of his stand, Mahony was told by the editor, Brian Penton, that he should seek other employment and dismissed as a staff-member. Penton then requested that George Finey produce a cartoon critical of striking coal miners. Finey refused, telling the editor he had "moral objections" to doing so, and he too was sacked (or resigned) from the newspaper.

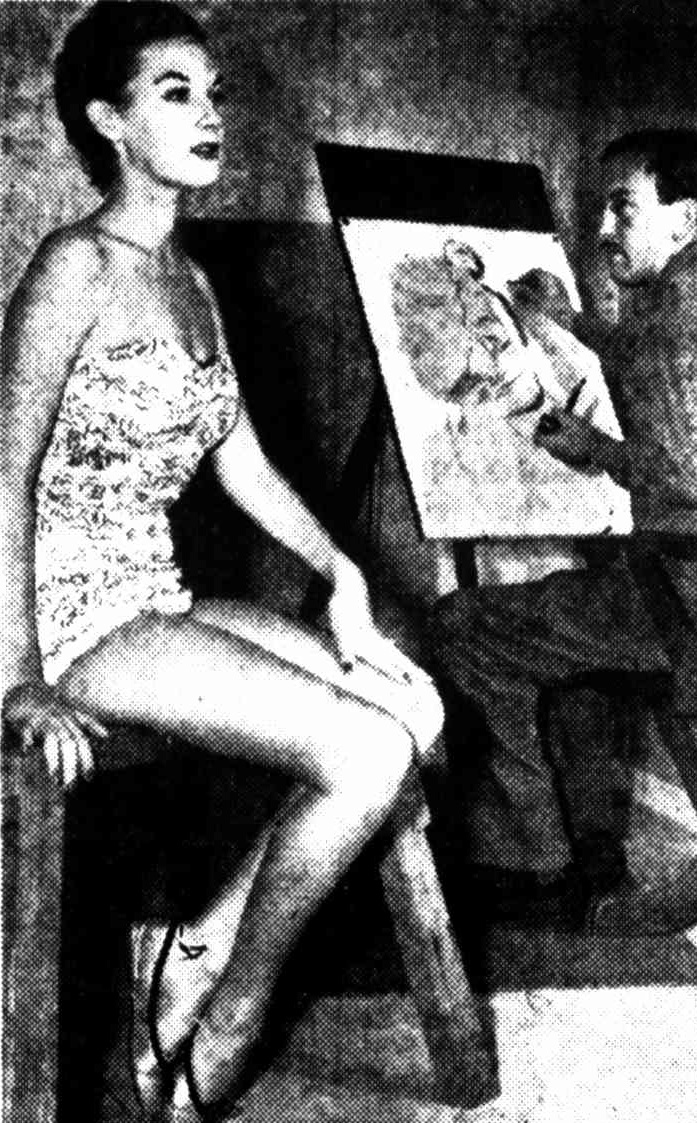
Photograph of Will Mahony sketching his daughter Janis, published in The Mail (Adelaide), 19 April 1952.

In the first half of 1945, Mahony had several cartoons published in Tribune, the official newspaper of the Communist Party of Australia.

=== Comic strips ===
In July 1945, Mahony took over the drawing of the Chesty Bond comic strip, replacing its original artist Syd Miller, who was contracted to draw the comic-strip Sandra for Melbourne's The Herald newspaper. By that stage, Chesty Bond was being published five days a week in The Sun newspaper in Sydney. Mahoney continued to illustrate Chesty Bond until April 1947, when it was taken over by Virgil Reilly.

Mahony provided the illustrations for The Bradman Book, compiled by 'Outfield', and published in 1948 by Atlas Publications in Melbourne to mark the Australian cricket team's test tour to England.

In 1955, Mahony collaborated with the author Gavin Casey to produce the comic strip Clamor, serialised in Melbourne's Argus newspaper, the story of "a great Australian racehorse who carries the blood of Carbine". The first instalment was published on 4 March 1955 as six-row strip, but subsequent daily instalments appeared as a single row on the page with the other regular Argus comic strips. The final instalment of Clamor was published on 6 September 1955.

Mahony provided illustrations for Gulf, written by Barry Crump and published in 1964.

=== Last years ===
The children's book The Great Ballagundi Damper Bake by Christobel Mattingley, published in 1975, was illustrated by Mahony. In 1977, Mahony provided the illustrations for the children's book The Famous Race for Wombat's Lace, with verse written by Graham Jenkin.

Mahony was living at Terrey Hills prior to his death.

Francis William ('Will') Mahony died on 1 April 1989, aged 84.

== Gallery ==
A selection of images by Will Mahony
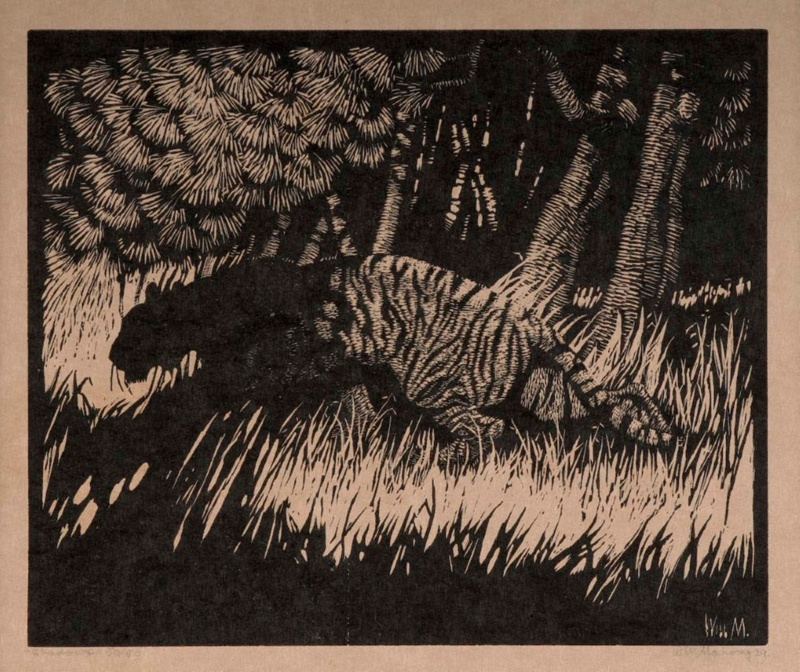
'Shadows', wood engraving (1929).

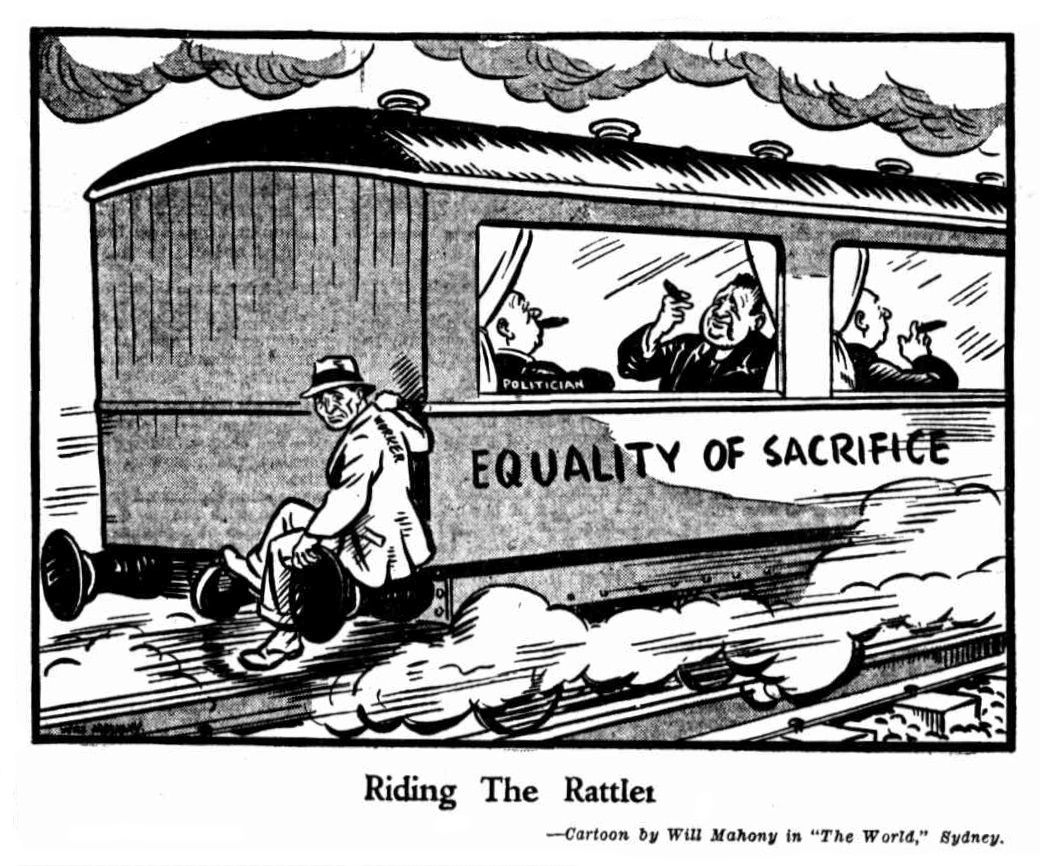
'Riding the Rattler', published in Daily Standard (Brisbane), 19 October 1932.

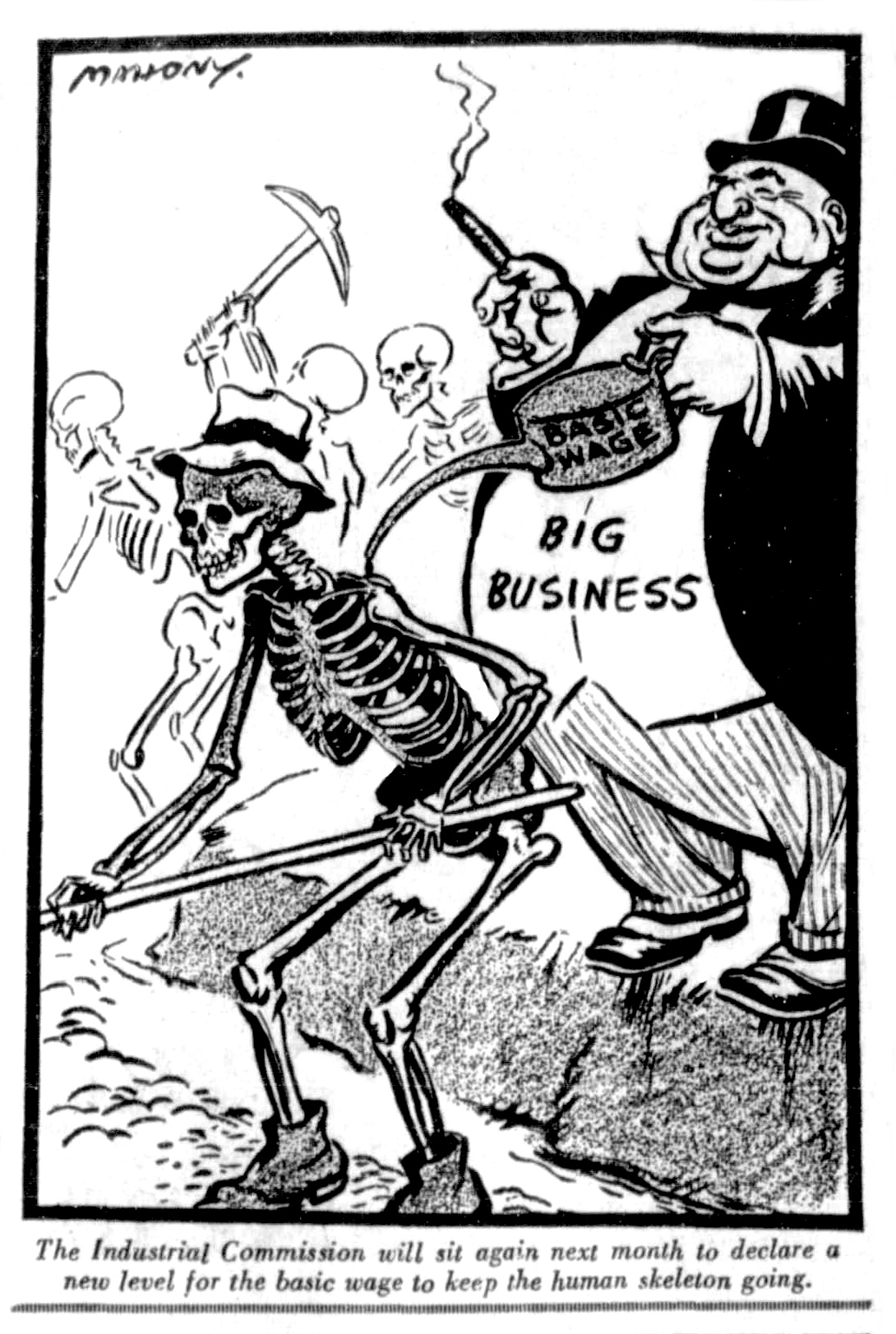
'It Won't Be Long', published in The Labor Daily (Sydney), 6 September 1933.

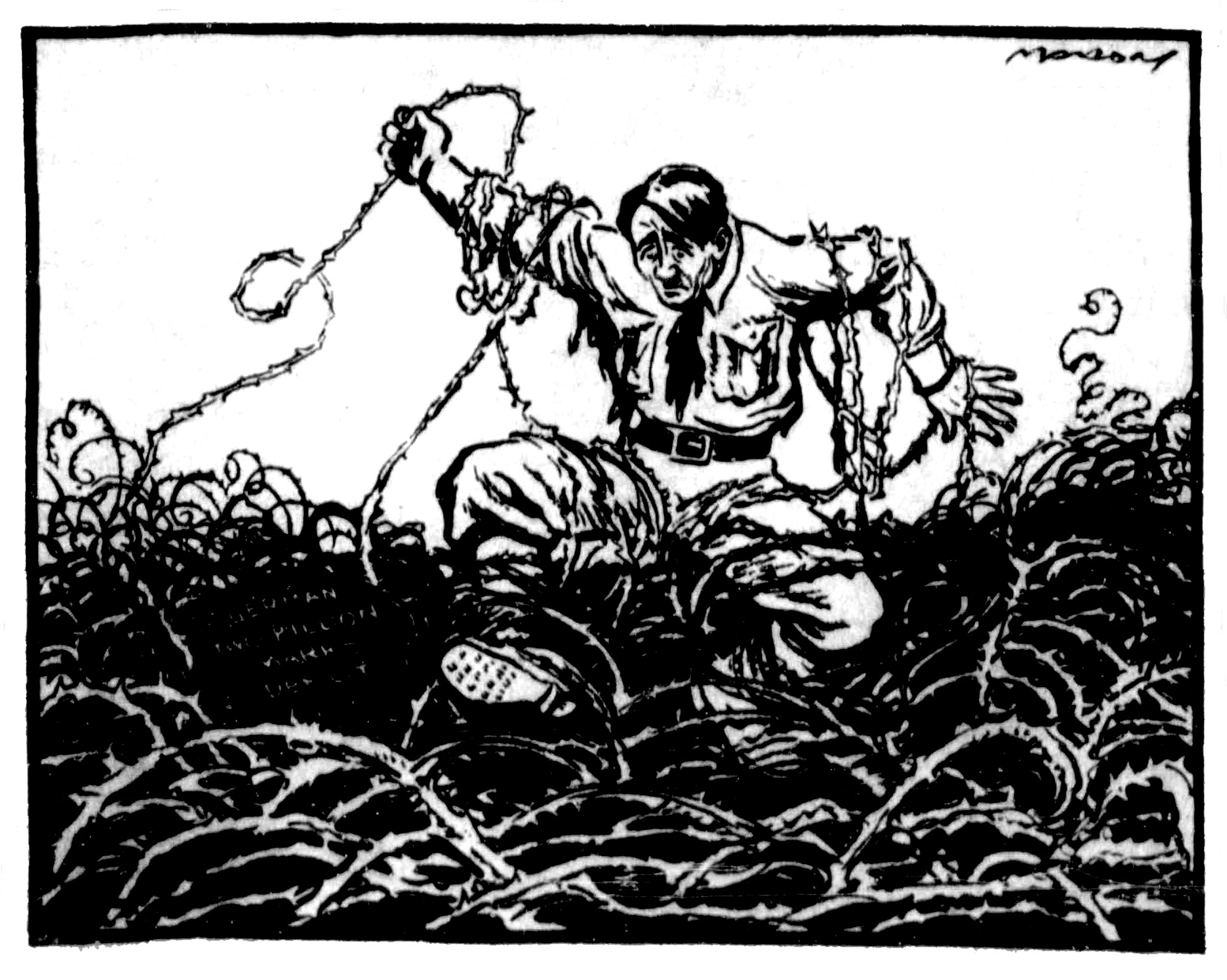
'Growing Fast', published in The Labor Daily, 24 June 1935.

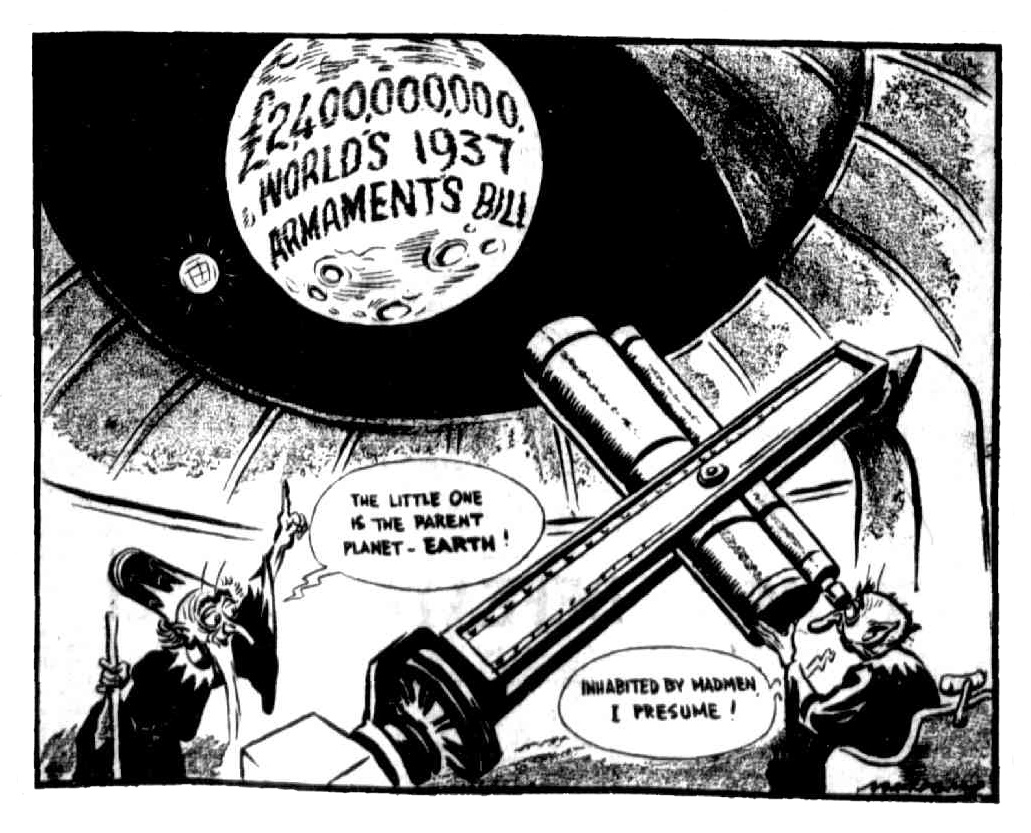
'Astronomical Oddity', published in The Labor Daily, 24 January 1938.

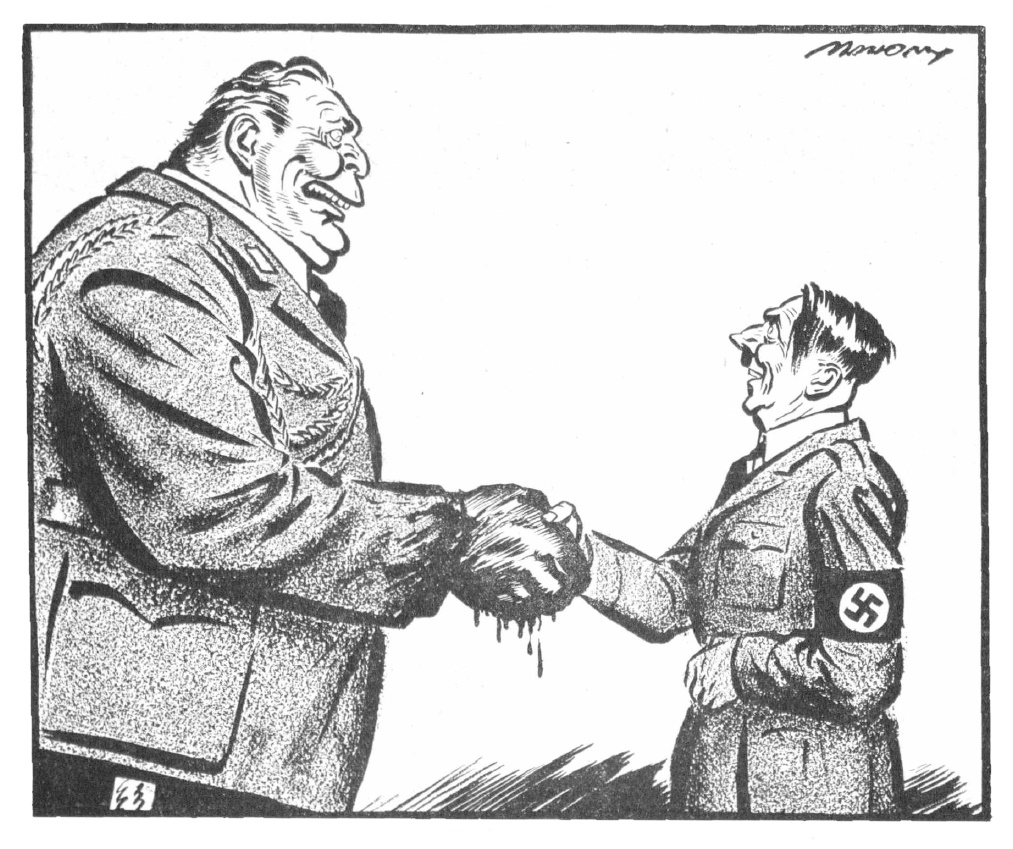
'"Nice Work Hermann"', first published in Daily Telegraph, 12 September 1940.

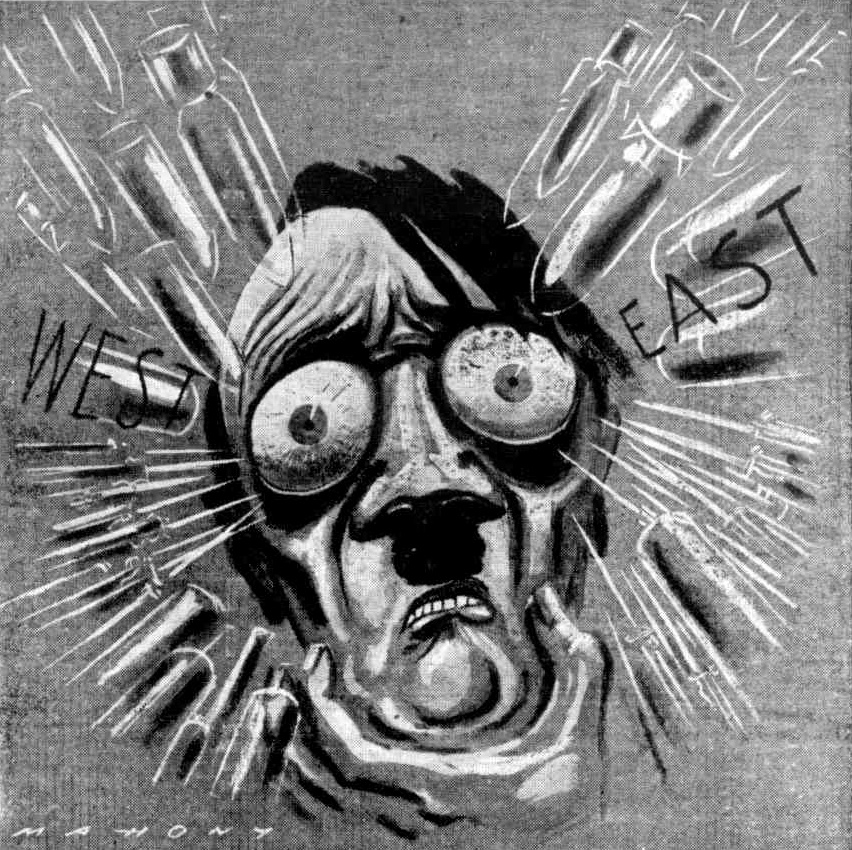
'Magnetic Eyes', published in Tribune (Sydney), 29 March 1945.

== Publications ==
- The Bradman Book, compiled by 'Outfield' with illustrations by Will Mahony, Melbourne: Atlas Publications, 1948.
- Barry Crump (1964), Gulf, Sydney: Halstead Press; illustrations by Will Mahony.
- Christobel Mattingley (1975), The Great Ballagundi Damper Bake, Sydney: Angus & Robertson; illustrations by Will Mahony.
- Graham Jenkin (1977), The Famous Race for Wombat's Lace, Sydney: Rigby; illustrations by Will Mahony.
