= Labor Daily =

Newspaper published in Sydney, New South Wales

The Labor Daily was a Sydney-based journal/newspaper of the early to mid 20th century. An organ of the Australian Labor Party, it was published in Sydney by Stanley Roy Wasson after the ailing Daily Mail was absorbed by Labor Papers Ltd, who began publication under that name on 6 January 1922 with the strong support of Albert Willis and the Miners' Federation. Willis was managing director 1926–1931 and chairman 1924–1930 and one of the most powerful political figures in the state. After a few weeks the paper's name was changed to the Labor Daily and was a supporter of Lang Labor.

In 1929 receivers sold Beckett's Budget to Labor Daily Ltd. The paper also became the major sponsor of the New South Wales Rugby Football League premiership from 1934, with the winners of the competition from 1934 to 1950 being awarded the Labour Daily Cup. From 1 December 1938 the Labor Daily became the Daily News which lasted until 1941 when it was taken over by The Daily Telegraph in 1950

== Contributors ==
Artists who contributed to the paper included

- Will Mahony, political cartoonist and son of Frank P. Mahony, he was with Sydney's Daily Telegraph, but sacked in 1944 for refusing to draw as the editor demanded. In 1955 he teamed up with Gavin Casey to present a strip cartoon "Clamor", the story of a (fictional) racehorse.
- George Finey, but was dropped after three months for his antipathy to Jack Lang.
- Alex Gurney was political cartoonist for the paper
- Frederick A. Brown was chief cartoonist 1928–1930

== Publications ==
Labor Daily was involved in publications apart from the newspaper:

- Paddison, Alfred Cornwallis The Lang Plan: The Case for Australia Labor Daily Printers 1931

as well as the more mundane work such as Union rule books.

== Sources ==
- The Labor daily at catalogue.nla.gov.au
- 200 years of Sydney Newspapers: a Short History by Victor Isaacs and Rod Kirkpatrick
- Media profiles: Associated, Sun and Smiths at ketupa.net
