= Christobel Mattingley =

Australian author (1931–2019)

- Born: Christobel Rosemary Shepley; 26 October 1931; Brighton, South Australia
- Died: 1 June 2019 (aged 87); Glenside, South Australia
- Education: University of Tasmania
- Occupation: Author

Christobel Rosemary Mattingley AM (26 October 1931 – 1 June 2019) was an Australian author of books for children and adults. Her book Rummage won the Children's Book of the Year Award: Younger Readers and Children's Book of the Year Award: Picture Book in 1982. In the 1996 Queen's Birthday Honours Mattingley was made a Member of the Order of Australia for "service to literature, particularly children's literature, and for community service through her commitment to social and cultural issues".

Her last book was Maralinga's long shadow: Yvonne's story, which was published in 2016 and won the 2017 the Young People's History Prize at the NSW Premier's History Awards.

== Bibliography ==
=== Children's books ===
- Mattingley, Christobel (1970). The picnic dog. Illustrated by Carolyn Dinan. London: Hamish Hamilton.
- Mattingley, Christobel (1973). Queen of the Wheat Castles. Leicester, UK: Brockhampton Press.
- Mattingley, Christobel (1981). Rummage. Illustrated by Patricia Mullins. Sydney: Angus & Robertson.
- Mattingley, Christobel (2016). Maralinga's long shadow : Yvonne's story. Crows Nest, NSW: Allen & Unwin.
- Mattingley, Christobel (1975). Lizard Log. Illustrated by Helen Sallis. Australia: Hodder & Stoughton.

=== Young adult books ===
- Mattingley, Christobel (1993). No Gun for Asmir. Melbourne: Text Publishing.
- Mattingley, Christobel (1996). Escape from Sarajevo.

=== Adult non-fiction ===
- *Mattingley, Christobel (2002). King of the Wilderness: The Life of Deny King. Melbourne: Text Publishing.

=== Essays and reporting ===
- Mattingley, Christobel (December 2001). "What an exciting find! Deny King's contributions to science". National Library of Australia News. XII (3): 7–10. Archived from the original on 19 January 2012.
- — (January 2002). "'You have made history' : Deny King's contributions to science". National Library of Australia News. XII (4): 7–10. Archived from the original on 19 January 2012.
- — (December 2009). "Feisty females : some early Australian 'lady pilots'". The National Library Magazine. 1 (4): 24–27. Archived from the original on 26 May 2015.

=== Books ===
- Mattingley, Christobel (1970). The picnic dog. Illustrated by Carolyn Dinan.
- Mattingley, Christobel (1971). The windmill at Magpie Creek. Illustrated by Gavin Rowe.
- Mattingley, Christobel (1971). Worm weather. Illustrated by Carolyn Dinan.
- Mattingley, Christobel (1972). Emu kite. Illustrated by Gavin Rowe.
- Mattingley, Christobel (1973). Queen of the wheat castles. Illustrated by Gavin Rowe.
- Mattingley, Christobel (1973). The battle of the galah trees. Illustrated by Gareth Floyd.
- Mattingley, Christobel (1974). Show and tell. Illustrated by Helen Sallis.
- Mattingley, Christobel (1974). The surprise mouse. Illustrated by Carolyn Dinan.
- Mattingley, Christobel (1975). Lizard log. Illustrated by Walter Stackpool.
- Mattingley, Christobel (1976). The special present. Illustrated by Noela Young.
- Mattingley, Christobel (1976). The long walk. Illustrated by Helen Sallis.
- Mattingley, Christobel (1977). Recent translations of European fiction for older children and young adults.
- Mattingley, Christobel (1977). New patches for old.
- Mattingley, Christobel (1977). The big swim. Illustrated by Elizabeth Honey.
- Mattingley, Christobel (1978). The jetty. Illustrated by Gavin Rowe.
- Mattingley, Christobel (1978). Budgerigar blue. Illustrated by Tony Oliver.
- Mattingley, Christobel (1979). Black dog. Illustrated by Craig Smith.
- Mattingley, Christobel (1981). Brave with Ben. Illustrated by Elizabeth Honey.
- Mattingley, Christobel (1981). Rummage. Illustrated by Patricia Mullins.
- Mattingley, Christobel (1982). Lexl and the lion party. Illustrated by Astra Lacis.
- Mattingley, Christobel (1983). Southerly buster.
- Mattingley, Christobel (1983). Duck boy. Illustrated by Patricia Mullins.
- Mattingley, Christobel (1983). The magic saddle. Illustrated by Patricia Mullins.
- Mattingley, Christobel (1983). The angel with a mouth-organ. Illustrated by Astra Lacis.
- Mattingley, Christobel (1984). Ghost sitter. Illustrated by Christina Brimage.
- Mattingley, Christobel (1985). The miracle tree. Illustrated by Marianne Yamaguchi.
- Mattingley, Christobel (1987). McGruer and the goat. Illustrated by Carol McLean-Carr.
- The Nungas (1988). Survival in our own land: "Aboriginal" experiences in "South Australia" since 1836. edited and researched by Christobel Mattingley, co-edited by Ken Hampton.
- Mattingley, Christobel (1990). The butcher, the beagle and the dog catcher. Illustrated by Carol McLean-Carr.
- Mattingley, Christobel (1991). The great Ballagundi damper bake. Illustrated by Will Mahony.
- Mattingley, Christobel (1992). Maiku walytjapiti = Tucker's mob. Illustrated by Jeanie Adams, Yankunytjatjara translation by Lucy Lester, Sandra Ken and Greg Wilson.
- Mattingley, Christobel (1992). Debatable issues.
- The Nungas (1992). Survival in our own land: "Aboriginal" experiences in "South Australia" since 1836. edited and researched by Christobel Mattingley, co-edited by Ken Hampton (Revised ed.).
- Mattingley, Christobel (1993). No gun for Asmir. Illustrated by Elizabeth Honey.
- Mattingley, Christobel (1993). The sack. Illustrated by Simon Kneebone.
- Mattingley, Christobel (1994). The race. Illustrated by Anne Spudvilas.
- Mattingley, Christobel (1995). Asmir in Vienna. Illustrated by Elizabeth Honey.
- Mattingley, Christobel (1996). Escape from Sarajevo.
- Mattingley, Christobel (1997). Daniel's secret. Illustrated by Mark Wilson.
- Mattingley, Christobel (1998). Work wanted. Illustrated by Simon Kneebone.
- Mattingley, Christobel (1998). Hurry up, Alice!. Illustrated by Michael Johnson.
- Mattingley, Christobel (1999). Big sister, little sister. Illustrated by Margaret Power.
- Mattingley, Christobel (1999). Cockawun and Cockatoo. Illustrated by Susy Boyer Rigby.
- Mattingley, Christobel (2000). First friend. Illustrated by Craig Smith.
- Mattingley, Christobel (2001). King of the wilderness: the life of Deny King.
- Mattingley, Christobel (2002). Tiger's milk. Illustrated by Anne Ferguson.
- Mattingley, Christobel (2003). Ruby of Trowutta: recollections of a country postmistress. Illustrated by Janet Fenton.
- Mattingley, Christobel (2003). Ginger. Illustrated by Margaret Power.
- Mattingley, Christobel (2005). Nest egg: the Christobel Mattingley reciter: a clutch of poems.
- Mattingley, Christobel (2007). Battle order 204: a bomber pilot's story.
- Mattingley, Christobel (2008). Chelonia Green: champion of turtles.
- Mattingley, Christobel (2009). Maralinga, the Anangu Story. Compiled with Yalata and Oak Valley community elders.
- Mattingley, Christobel (2010). For the love of nature: E.E. Gostelow's birds & flowers.
- Mattingley, Christobel (2010). A brilliant touch: Adam Forster's wildflower paintings.
- Mattingley, Christobel (2011). The eye of the beholder: Peter Dombrovskis, photographer, champion of wilderness.
- Mattingley, Christobel (2012). My father's islands: Abel Tasman's heroic voyages.
- Mattingley, Christobel (2014). Seen but not heard: Lilian Medland's birds.
- Mattingley, Christobel (2016). Forward march. Illustrated by David Kennett.
- Mattingley, Christobel (2016). Maralinga's long shadow: Yvonne's story.
