= Landtakers =

Landtakers is a 1934 Australian novel by Brian Penton.

== Premise ==
The story of Derek Cabell, an English immigrant to the Moreton Bay settlement in the 1840s.

== The Inheritors ==
It was followed by a sequel The Inheritors (1936) which was set in Queensland in the 1870s.

It was less popular.

== Kangaroo ==
When Lewis Milestone was in Australia making Kangaroo for 20th Century Fox he was contacted by Penton who offered the director the use of material from his books Landtakers and The Inheritors. Milestone loved the books and felt "they would make marvellous pictures of their type." He tried to persuade Fox to drop the script for Kangaroo and film the Penton books instead but the studio refused. However Milestone used some material from the novels in the final script, in particular treatment of drought.

== Notes ==
- Higham, Charles; Greenberg, Joel (1971). The celluloid muse; Hollywood directors speak. Regnery. pp. 188–190.
