= Chesty Bond =

Comic strip

The Chesty Bond logo

Chesty Bond is a fictional cartoon character and trademark for the Australian clothing company Bonds. The character was created in 1940, a co-creation of the advertising account manager Ted Moloney and artist Syd Miller. Chesty Bond was conceived as a likeable and heroic character in a continuous newspaper comic-strip, intended as a marketing campaign to sell the Bonds Athletic singlet. The comic-strip format, with a constantly changing storyline, proved to be extremely popular and continued to be published until 1963. Chesty Bond was possibly the world's first daily advertising comic-strip. By virtue of its popularity and longevity, Chesty Bond became absorbed into Australian popular culture as a national icon.

== Origins ==
The nexus between cartooning and the advertising of Bonds Athletic vests began in October 1936 with a series of crudely drawn cartoons used in advertisements for the singlet in Australian Women's Weekly.

The first Bonds advertising comic-strip, called Embarrassing Moments from History, commenced in March 1937. The advertising strip appeared in various eastern Australian newspapers, initially made up of comic-strips illustrated by the artists Syd Nicholls, Syd Miller, George C. Little and 'Wep' (William E. Pidgeon). The strips consisted of separate vignettes featuring historical, biblical and fictional characters, always somehow involving a "Bonds Athletic vest" (singlet). After the initial strips appeared and had been re-run, new comic-strips in the series began to be published from October 1937, all drawn by Miller. In the creation of the Bonds advertising content, Syd Miller collaborated with Ted Moloney, who worked for the J. Walter Thompson advertising agency. Moloney and Miller had known each other since the 1930s when they both worked for Smith's Weekly newspaper. The Embarrassing Moments from History advertising comic-strip continued to appear in newspapers until the end of 1939, though no new strips were drawn after October 1938.

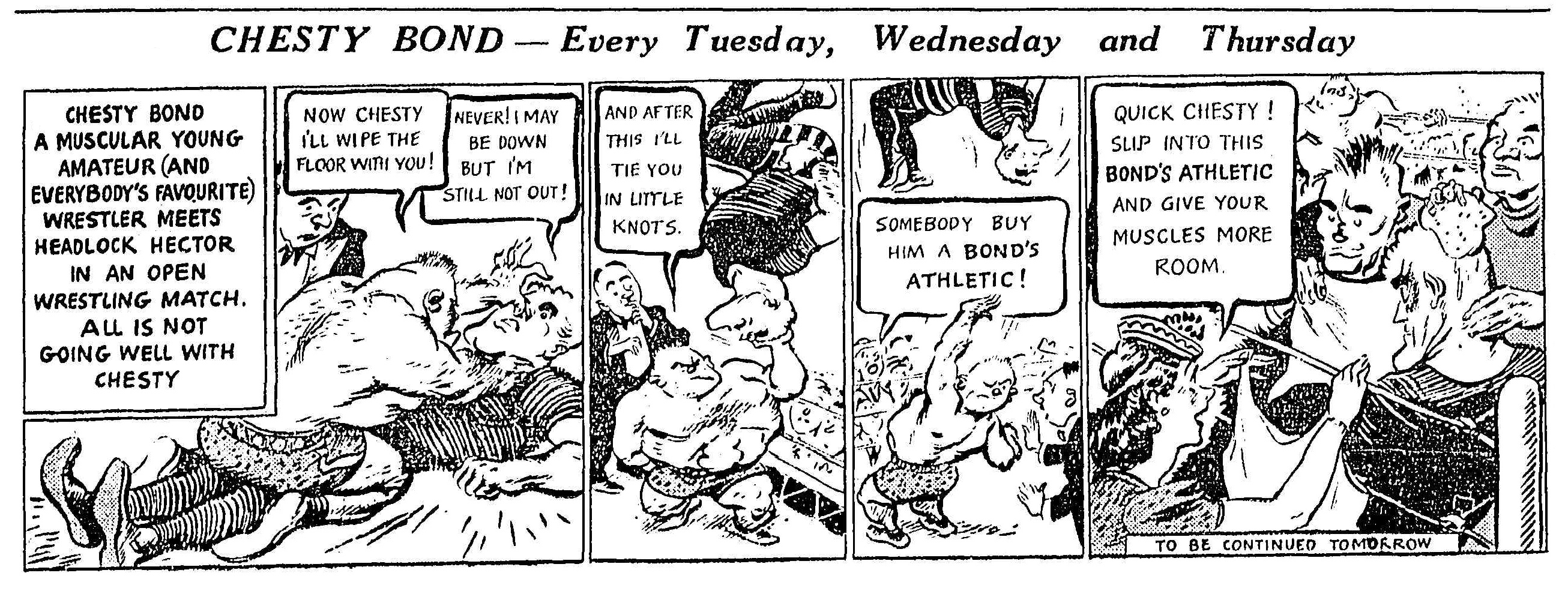
The first 'Chesty Bond' comic-strip, illustrated by Syd Miller, published in The Sun (Sydney), 19 March 1940.

In late 1939 Miller began to illustrate new advertising comic-strips for Bonds called Aussie History. It was a similar concept to the Embarrassing Moments from History content, but with a focus on Australian history. Like its predecessor, the Aussie History advertising comic-strip was published and re-run in various newspapers. It was relatively short-lived, appearing only from August to December 1939. Several of the characters depicted in the Aussie History series had resonances with the 'Chesty Bond' character as it was later developed.

The 'Chesty Bond' character was a co-creation of Miller and Moloney. It was Ted Moloney who suggested to Miller the name "Chesty Bond" as "an image character" for their cartoon advertisements. The concept, as devised between the advertising account manager and the artist, was an "heroic straight man", who was "strong, ... kind, likeable, good-looking, but not a male model, and not a comic idiot". He would be "an Australian strong man... made super by or when he was wearing his Bonds singlet". Miller set about sketching ideas for the character. Chesty Bond's distinctive chin was inspired by the jawline of Jack Lang, New South Wales Premier during the Depression years, a feature of the politician's face invariably utilised by cartoonists and caricaturists.

It was usually Moloney who wrote the script for each advertising comic-strip, but on the first occasion Chesty Bond was published, Moloney had to travel to Melbourne and Miller was required to both write and illustrate the strip. The first Chesty Bond comic-strip was published in Sydney's The Sun newspaper on Tuesday, 19 March 1940.

== The comic-strip ==
The Chesty Bond comic-strip became a regular feature in The Sun newspaper in Sydney after it was first published in March 1940, appearing three times each week, every Tuesday, Wednesday, and Thursday. For a ten month period, from May 1941 to February 1942, the comic-strip was also published in Sydney's Daily Telegraph. From April 1942 the strip in The Sun was extended to four days a week, Monday to Thursday. From September 1942 Chesty Bond was extended further to five days a week, Monday to Friday, thus possibly becoming the world’s first daily advertising comic-strip.

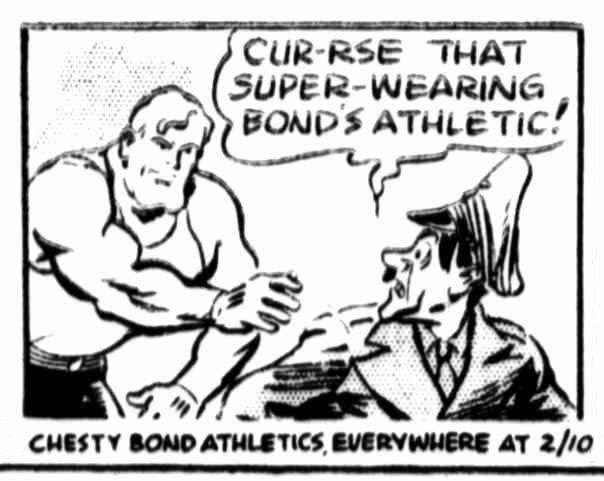
'Chesty Bond' confronts Adolf Hitler (from Sydney's The Sun, 11 January 1945).

The central concept of the comic-strip was that Chesty Bond, with his characteristic jutting jaw and impressive physique, became a superhero while wearing his Bond's Athletic singlet. Miller's wartime strips incorporated patriotic messages and invited readers to contribute to civilian efforts such as buying War Savings Bonds. During the war-years Chesty Bond was often involved in encounters with the forces of Imperial Japan, including an encounter with General Tojo.

The American film comedian Bob Hope arrived in Sydney in August 1944 after he and a group of entertainers had performed shows for troops in operational areas in the South and South West Pacific war zones. Hope remained in Australia for two weeks before returning to the United States. A sequence of eight comic-strips published in late October to early November 1944 featured an encounter between Hope and Chesty Bond on a Pacific island; an initial misunderstanding ended amicably with Chesty telling Hope, "You're doing a grand job entertaining the boys!". Miller used the American comedian's image in the episodes without permission, which resulted in threats of a lawsuit.

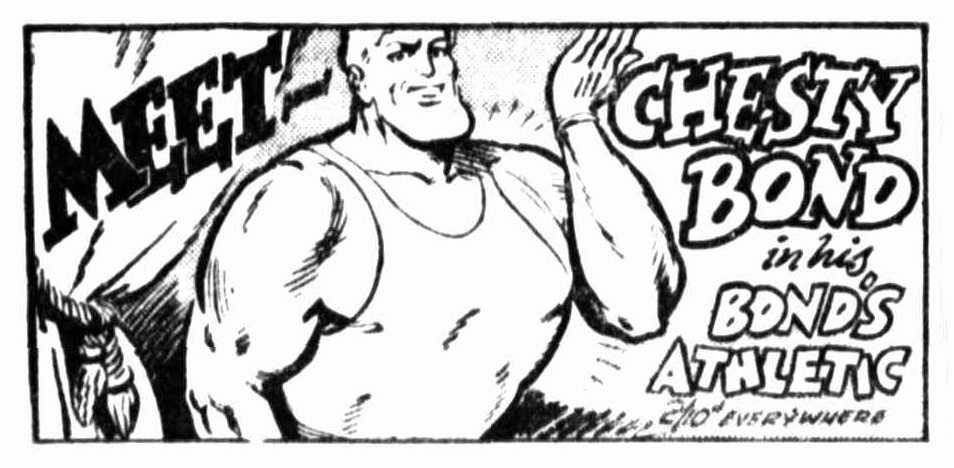
A panel from the introductory Chesty Bond comic-strip when it was first published in Brisbane's The Telegraph newspaper, 28 October 1946.

In a series of strips from January to March 1945 Chesty Bond confronts Adolf Hitler, disrupts a Nazi plot to clone their leader and takes Hitler captive, leaving him securely tied "until the war ends" using his Bond's Athletic singlet and guarded by a resistance fighter.

Syd Miller continued to draw the Chesty Bond strip until July 1945. It was taken over by Francis 'Will' Mahony after Miller was contracted to draw the comic-strip Sandra for Melbourne's The Herald newspaper. During the period November 1945 to August 1950 Chesty Bond was also published in Melbourne's The Argus newspaper. The comic-strip began being published in Brisbane's The Telegraph newspaper from October 1946.

Will Mahony continued to draw Chesty Bond until April 1947. From about May 1947 the Chesty Bond comic-strip was illustrated by Virgil Reilly before he passed it on to Cec Linaker in February 1948. Linaker drew the strip until December 1949, with John Santry taking over from January 1950.^{[A]} In March 1951 the comic-strip reverted to four days a week, Tuesday to Friday. John Santry continued to draw the Chesty Bond comic-strip until it was discontinued in 1963.

Although the Chesty Bond comic-strip was clearly an advertisement, it proved to be immensely popular with the public. As a result of the successful campaign, Chesty Bond became the archetypal Australian hero synonymous with Australian masculinity and an icon recognised Australia-wide.

== Other publicity campaigns ==
By the 1950s the image of the Chesty Bond cartoon character was being used in advertisements for the Bonds company's products. Bonds Industries Ltd. also had 'Chesty Bond' mannequins constructed to advertise their products in stores. The mannequin was a hollow torso with painted facial features and moulded hair, designed as a shop display feature to be dressed in a Bonds Athletic singlet.

In 1951 North Sydney and Manly-Warringah rugby league player Max Whitehead was selected to be the human model for the Chesty Bonds character, though a prosthetic chin was fitted for his photo shoots to make it a little more prominent.

== Gallery ==
The evolution of the Chesty Bond image
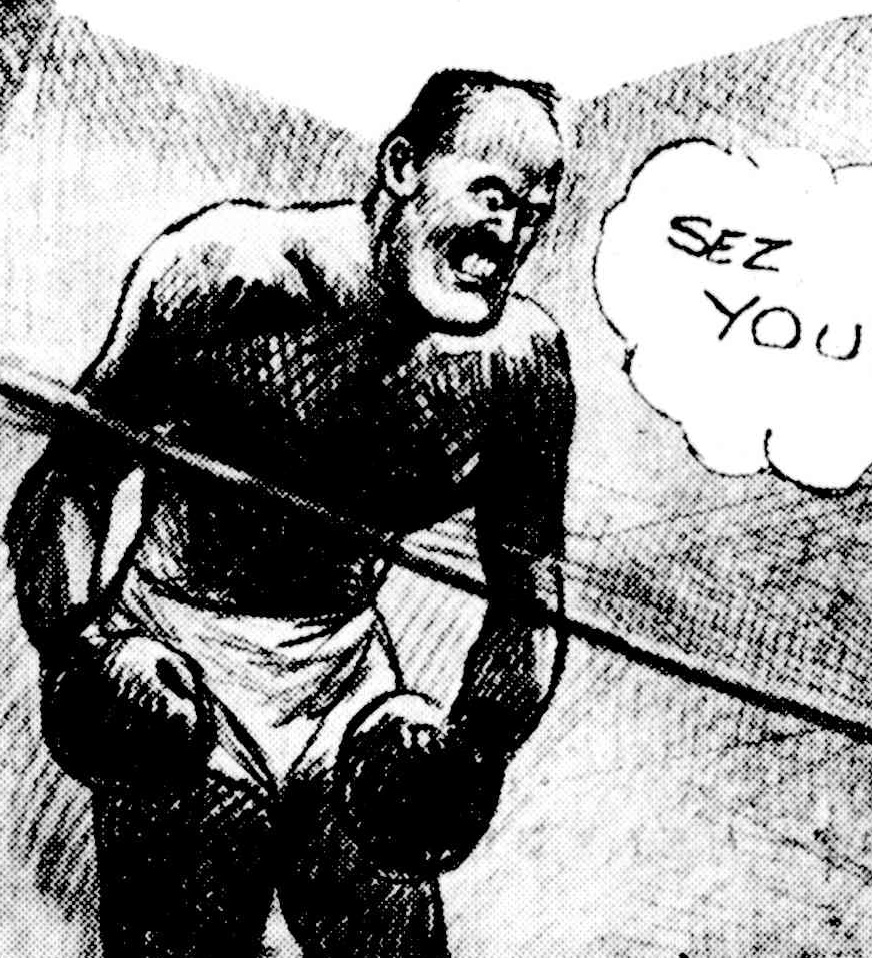
Detail from a cartoon by Virgil Reilly depicting the politician Jack Lang, the original inspiration for Chesty Bond's chin (Smith's Weekly, 10 June 1933).

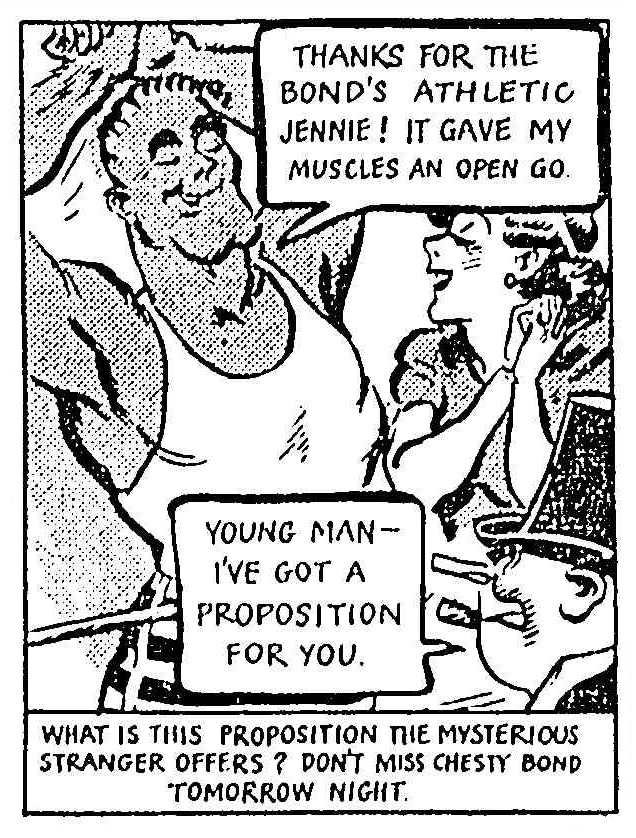
Illustrated by Syd Miller, published in The Sun (Sydney), 20 March 1940.

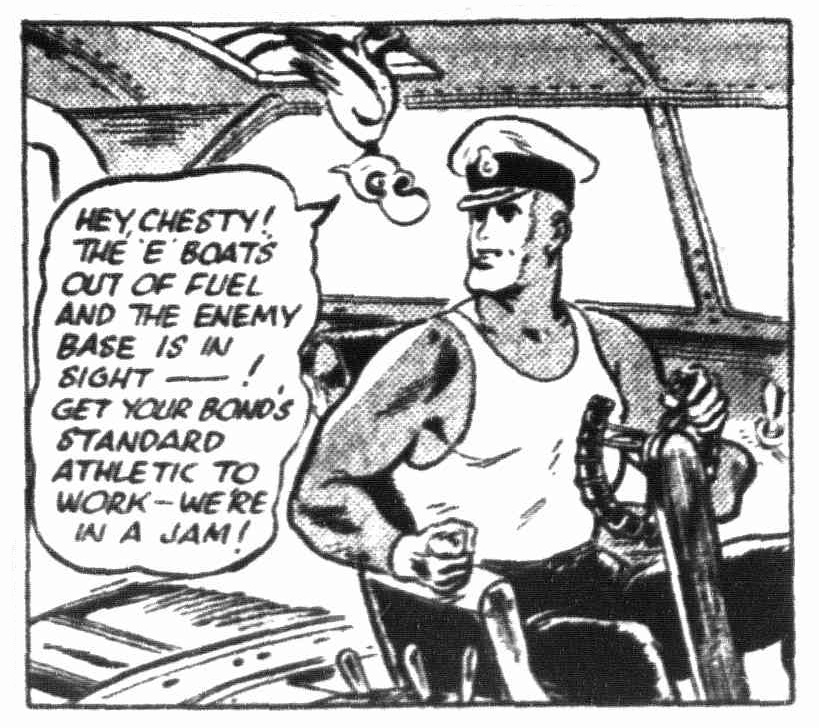
Illustrated by Syd Miller, published in The Sun (Sydney), 21 June 1941.

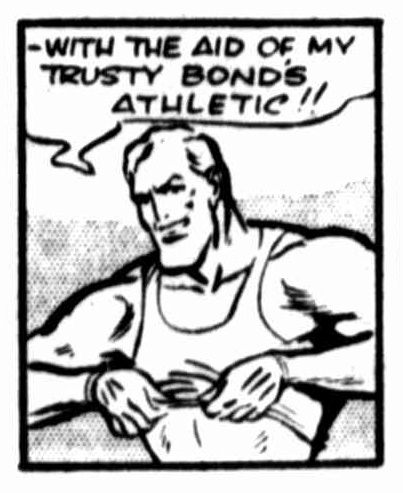
Illustrated by 'Will' Mahony, published in The Sun, 26 March 1946.

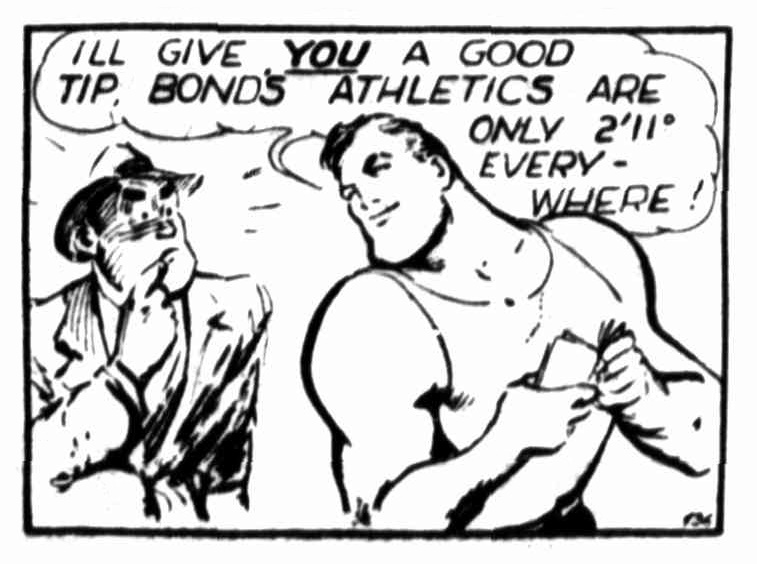
Illustrated by Virgil Reilly, published in The Sun, 4 November 1947.

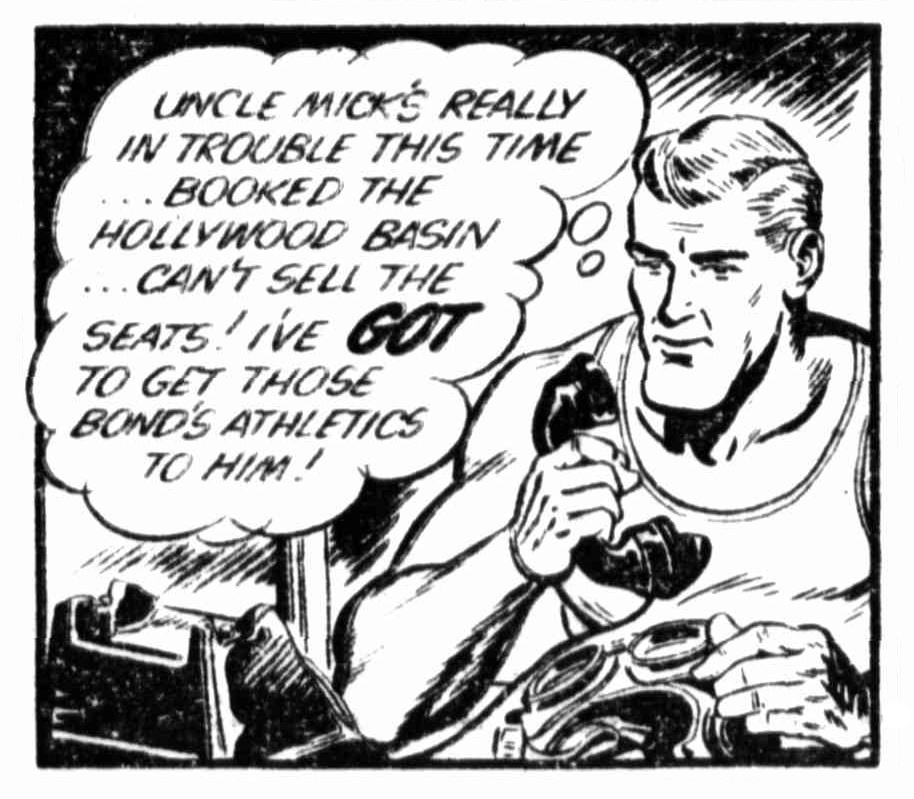
Illustrated by Cec Linkaker, published in The Sun, 26 April 1949.

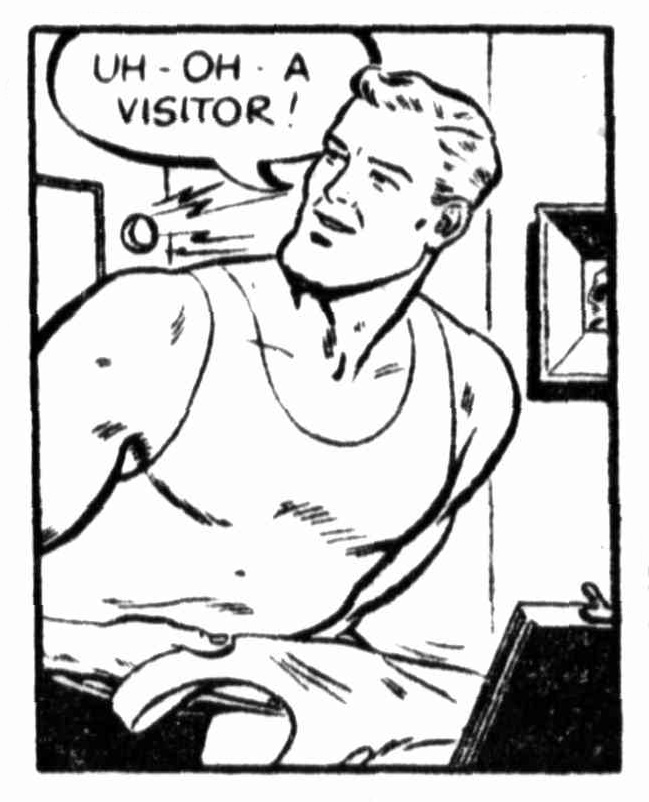
Illustrated by John Santry, published in The Sun, 18 January 1950.

== Notes ==
A.The 'Chesty Bond' comic-strips were irregularly signed by the artists so dates of hand-overs from one artist to another are approximate, based on signed comic-strips and cited references.
