= Bonds (clothing) =

Australian clothing company

Pacific Brands Underwear Group
- Type: Subsidiary
- Industry: Clothing
- Founded: Sydney (1915; 111 years ago)
- Founder: George Alan Bond
- Headquarters: 115 Cotham Rd, Kew, Melbourne, Australia
- Products: Underwear Socks Sleepwear; Light casual apparel
- Parent: Gildan
- Website: www.bonds.com.au

Pacific Brands Underwear Group, known under its core brand Bonds, was an Australian manufacturer and is now a subsidiary of Gildan. It is an importer of men's, women's and children's underwear, socks and other clothing. The head office is located at 115 Cotham Rd in Kew, Melbourne. They sell a range of clothing including underwear and sleepwear.

== History ==
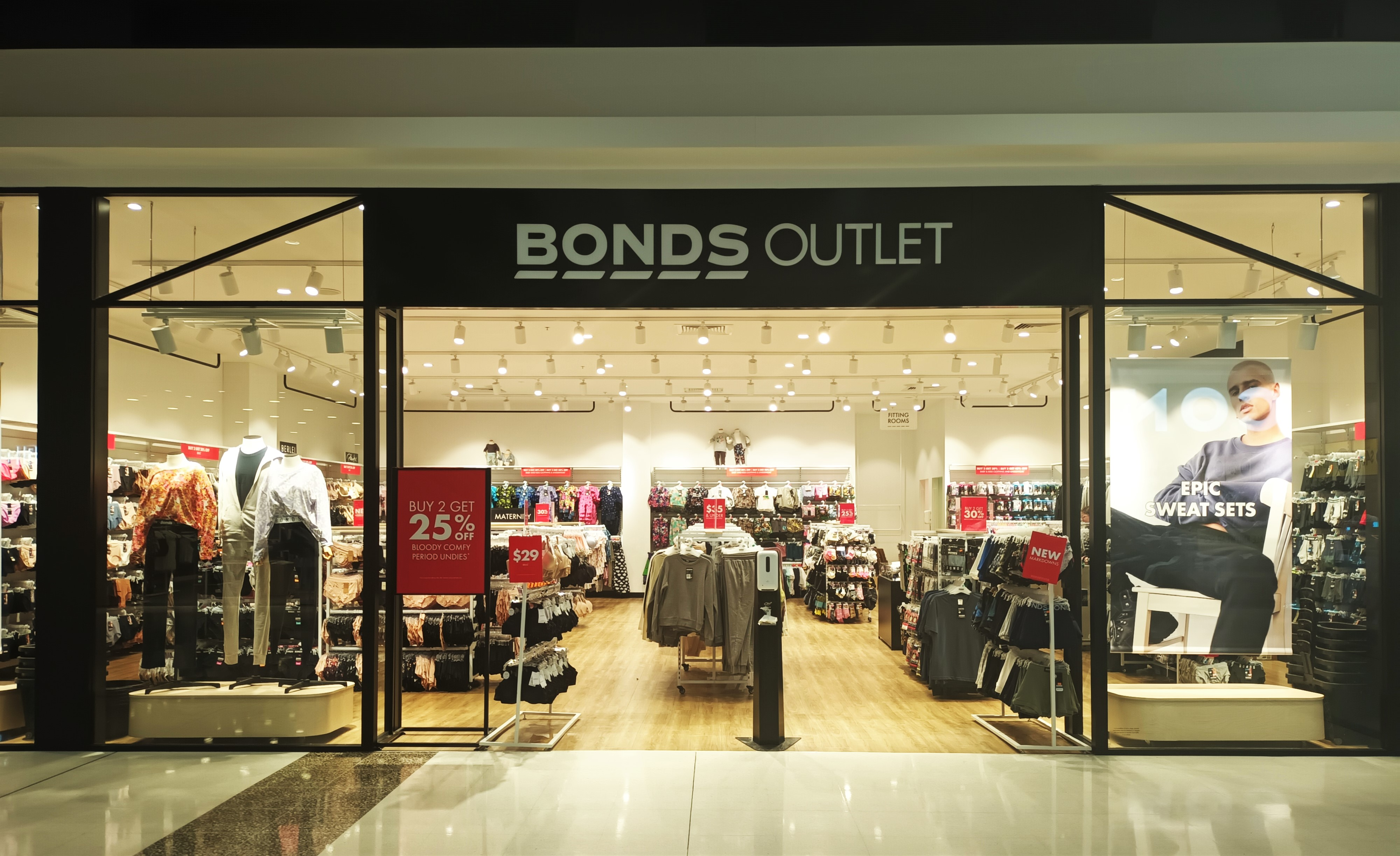
A Bonds Outlet store, 2022

George A. Bond & Co. Limited was established in 1915 by George Allan Bond, an American who came to Australia in the early twentieth century. He started importing women's hosiery and gloves. In 1917 he began manufacturing hosiery in Redfern, Sydney. In 1918 he moved to Camperdown and began also making underwear.

In 1923 Bond's company established a cotton-spinning mill at Wentworthville in western Sydney, with imported machinery costing 150 thousand pounds. The mill commenced operations in October 1923. This particular section of Wentworthville was soon renamed Pendle Hill in honour of his Scottish family origins. To facilitate easy access to Bond's Spinning Mills for employees, a railway station and eventually a whole new suburb were created.

The company went into liquidation in December 1927 and a public company, Bonds Industries Limited, was established. In 1970 the company merged with Coats Paton Pty Ltd. In 1987 the company was taken over by Pacific Dunlop, and it was then sold in 2001 to form a separate entity, Pacific Brands Holdings Pty Ltd. At that time also the spinning mill was closed. In 2004 Pacific Brands Limited was listed as a public company on the Australian Stock Exchange (ASX) and the New Zealand Exchange (NZX).

In 2006, Bonds manufactured 40% of its goods in Australia at three sites in New South Wales: Cessnock, Unanderra and Wentworthville.

Pacific Brands cut 1850 jobs and ceased manufacturing in Australia by September 2010 to reduce manufacturing costs. After public outrage and media coverage of the sacked staff, a group of former employees banded together to form Tuffys & Tuffetts underwear, buying much of Bonds' old equipment and rehiring sacked staff.

On 28 April 2016 Pacific Brands entered into an agreement with Hanesbrands for the acquisition of 100% of the company and it became a wholly owned subsidiary of Hanesbrands on 15 July 2016.

== See also ==
- Chesty Bond
- List of sock manufacturers
- Nike
