= Brian Penton =

Australian journalist and novelist

Brian Con Penton (21 August 1904 – 24 August 1951) was an Australian journalist and novelist. He was born at Ascot, a suburb of Brisbane, and educated at Brisbane Grammar School.

== Writing career ==
In 1921 Penton found employment as a copy-boy on the Brisbane Courier and went on to work on The Sydney Morning Herald, The Daily Express and The Daily Mail in London and Sir Frank Packer's The Daily Telegraph in Sydney. He eventually became the editor of The Daily Telegraph. He also did some speech-writing for the Australian prime minister Stanley Melbourne Bruce, and for Bruce's predecessor Billy Hughes. In addition, he worked as a political and social commentator and published a number of works criticizing the political regimes of the day.

Penton wrote two novels, which sold quite well: Landtakers (1934), which chronicles pioneering life in Queensland from 1824 to 1864, and a sequel Inheritors (1936). One of the principal characters in these books is said to be based on Patrick Mayne of the Mayne Inheritance.

William Dobell won the 1943 Archibald Prize (awarded January 1944) with his caricature portrait of Joshua Smith (artist). In the ensuing controversy Penton sided with Dobell, both in The Daily Telegraph and in his 1946 book on Dobell. The book includes a reproduction of Dobell's caricature portrait of Penton, submitted to the same Archibald exhibition.

Penton Place, in the Canberra suburb of Gilmore, is named in his honour.

== Works ==
- Landtakers: The Story of an Epoch. Endeavour Press, Sydney. 1934.
- Inheritors. Angus & Robertson, Sydney. 1936.
- Advance Australia – Where?. Cassell & Co, Sydney. 1943.
- Think – Or Be Damned. Halstead Press, Sydney. 1941.
- Dobell, William (1946). The Art of William Dobell. Ure Smith Pty Ltd, Sydney. (wrote introduction)
- Censored!. Shakespeare Head Press, Sydney. 1947.

== See also ==
- Australian outback literature of the 20th century
