= Lafave Newspaper Features =

- Formerly: Arthur J. Lafave
- Industry: Print syndication
- Founded: 1931; 95 years ago
- Founder: Arthur J. Lafave
- Defunct: 1963; 63 years ago
- Headquarters: 2042 E. 4th St, Cleveland, Ohio, U.S.
- Key people: Arthur J. Lafave, Jr.
- Products: Comic strips, newspaper columns, editorial cartoons
- Owner: Arthur J. Lafave

Lafave Newspaper Features was a syndication service that operated from 1931 to 1963. It was founded by Cleveland businessman Arthur J. Lafave and specialized in comic strips and gag cartoons. It is most well known for syndicating Clifford McBride's Napoleon and Uncle Elby. The syndicate also distributed Louise Davis' column Today's Etiquette.

== History ==
Lafave launched the syndicate in 1931, and in 1932 signed McBride's Napoleon and Uncle Elby, successfully distributing the strip for twenty years. In the mid-1940s, the strip was carried by 80 newspapers. Other strips Lafave launched in the 1930s — like Jimmy Caborn's Little Rodney and Jim Lavery's Aladdin McFadden — didn't fare so well.

American Adventure, by historian Bradford Smith and artists Dan Heilman and later Edwin Haeberle, was syndicated from 1949 to 1951.

In 1952, McBride's widow Margot Fischer McBride and new artist Roger Armstrong took Napoleon and Uncle Elby to the Mirror Enterprises Syndicate. Lafave reacted by signing a flurry of new strips, including Dick Huemer and Paul Murry's Buck O' Rue (1951–c. 1953), and John Duncan's Jungo (1954), neither of which proved popular. Lafave had moderate success with Steve Feeley and Ed Kuekes' Do You Believe (1955–1962); and "Dr. B.C. Douglas" (Dr. Michael Anthony Petti) and Frank Thorne's Dr. Guy Bennett (launched in 1957), which changed its title to Dr. Duncan in 1961, running under that title until 1963. In 1957, Lafave also brought over the Australian comic strip The Potts by Jim Russell (also changing its title in 1961 to Uncle Dick), syndicating the strip until 1962; it appeared in 35 U.S. newspapers.

Lafave Newspaper Features went defunct in c. 1963 shortly after the death of its founder.

== Lafave Newspaper Features strips and panels ==
- Aladdin McFadden by Jim Lavery (1937)
- American Adventure (January 10, 1949–c. April 1951) by writer Bradford Smith and artists Dan Heilman (1949–1950) and Edwin Haeberle (1950–1951)
- Buck O' Rue by Dick Huemer and Paul Murry (Jan. 15, 1951–c. 1953)
- Do You Believe by Steve Feeley and Ed Kuekes (1955–1962)
- Dr. Guy Bennett / Dr. Duncan (1957–1963) written by "Dr. B.C. Douglas" (Dr. Michael Anthony Petti) and illustrated by Frank Thorne
- Ginger by Jimmy Bancks
- Jungo by John Duncan (1954)
- Little Rodney by Jimmy Caborn (1937–1939)
- Napoleon and Uncle Elby by Clifford McBride (1932–1952; moved to Mirror Enterprises Syndicate)
- The Potts / Uncle Dick by Jim Russell (June 3, 1957 – 1962)
