= Frank Dickens =

British cartoonist (1931–2016)

- Born: Frank William Huline-Dickens; 9 December 1931; Hornsey, London, England
- Died: 8 July 2016 (aged 84)
- Known for: Cartoons
- Notable work: Bristow

Frank William Huline-Dickens (9 December 1931 – 8 July 2016) was a British cartoonist, best known for his strip Bristow, which ran for 51 years in the Evening Standard and was syndicated internationally. According to Guinness World Records, Bristow was the longest running daily cartoon strip by a single author. The character Bristow is even one year older than that, as he debuted in Dickens' older series Oddbod in The Sunday Times in 1960. Due to his popularity, he received his own spin-off series soon afterwards. Dickens broke the original record held by Marc Sleen, whose The Adventures of Nero was drawn for 45 years without any assistance. However, even Dickens' record has been broken in his turn by Jim Russell, whose series The Potts ran for 62 years. Dickens received eight awards for "Strip Cartoonist of the Year" from the Cartoonists' Club of Great Britain.

== Career ==
Born in Hornsey, London, the son of a painter and decorator, Dickens left school at the age of 16, and began working for his father. He then took a job as a buying clerk in an engineering firm for three months, before in 1946 deciding to pursue an ambition to become a champion racing cyclist. Legend has it that he moved to Paris after his national service but failed to make a living at cycling, so he tried to make money by selling cycling cartoons to French magazines, including L'Équipe and Paris Match. The part about moving to France is, however, untrue, though much repeated. A self-taught artist, he had his first cartoon published in a British national newspaper, the Sunday Express on 30 September 1959. Work in the Evening Standard, Daily Sketch and Daily Mirror followed, and in December 1960 he began a three-month period at the Sunday Times, where he took his strip "Oddbod". One of the characters in that strip was developed into the bowler-hatted Bristow. The Bristow strip first appeared in regional papers, before being taken up by the Evening Standard on 6 March 1962.

In 1971, Bristow was produced on stage at the ICA, London, starring Freddie Jones. In 1999, Dickens adapted Bristow as a six-part series for BBC Radio 4, featuring Michael Williams, Rodney Bewes and Dora Bryan. Anne Karpf observed in The Guardian: "From cartoon strip to radio series is no longer a large leap, although Frank Dickens's Bristow, about an idle paper-pusher in a large firm, scarcely invites the kind of Superman cartoon radio techniques that have become so familiar. Yet the first in this new Radio 4 series cleverly managed to sound simultaneously knowing and naïf."

Since 1966, twelve Bristow compilations in book form have been published: by Constable (1966), Allison & Busby (1970), Abelard-Schuman (1972, 1973, 1974, 1975), Futura (1976), Barrie & Jenkins (1978), Penguin Books (1981), Macmillan (1982), and Beaumont Book Company (Australia, 1977, 1978). The most recent is The Big, Big, Big, Bristow Book (Little, Brown & Company, 2001).

The strip that brought Dickens greatest financial success, through syndication in the United States, was "Albert Herbert Hawkins: The Naughtiest Boy in the World" – which reportedly captures the "essential naughtiness" of its author.

Dickens also published several children's books, as well as thrillers connected with bicycle racing: A Curl Up and Die Day (Peter Owen Publishers, 1980) and Three Cheers for the Good Guys (Macmillan, 1984).

On 2 February 2012, BBC Radio 4 broadcast a tribute to Frank Dickens called Holy Mackerel – It's My Life! to mark his 80th birthday, narrated by Bernard Cribbins and with contributors who included fellow cartoonists Ralph Steadman and Rick Brookes. The programme was repeated on 13 May 2012.

Dickens died on 8 July 2016 after a long illness.
