= Butte High School (Butte, Montana) =

Location
- 401 South Wyoming; Butte, Montana 59701; United States; 46.00852°N 112.53325°W

Information
- Type: Public
- Established: 1896; 130 years ago
- School district: Butte School District No. 1
- Principal: John Metz
- Teaching staff: 79.36 (FTE)
- Grades: 9–12
- Enrollment: 1,272 (2023–2024)
- Student to teacher ratio: 16.03
- Colors: Purple & White
- Mascot: Bulldog
- Rivals: Butte Central Catholic High School
- Newspaper: The Mountaineer
- Yearbook: The Bulldog (1947–Present); The Mountaineer (1907–1939)
- Website: www.bsd1.org/schools/butte-high-school

Butte High School is a public high school in Butte, Montana. It was established in 1896.

== Academics and student life ==
Due to Butte High School's close association with local university Montana Tech, students are offered a large number of dual credit and AP courses, ranging from United States Government to Chemistry. Butte High School has a number of sports including, but not limited to: American football, volleyball, basketball, cross country, and golf. As for non-sport related activities, Butte High School has a speech and debate program as well as a band. Clubs are also a staple of a student's repertoire with Excel Club and History Club maintaining active student rosters.

== Notable alumni ==
Notable people

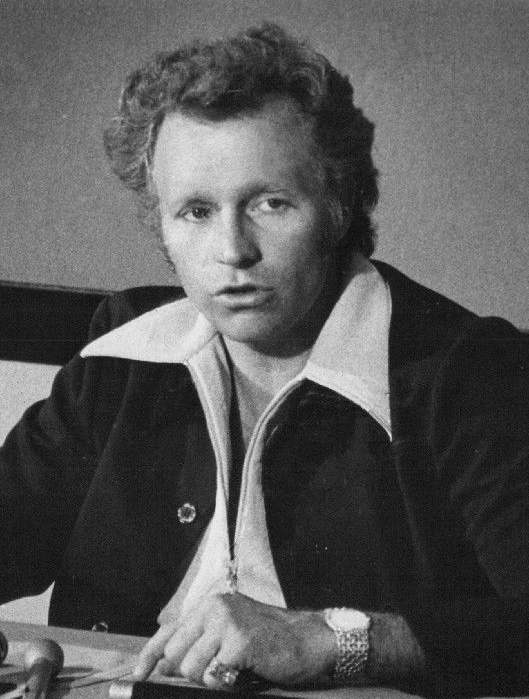
Evel Knievel
Daredevil

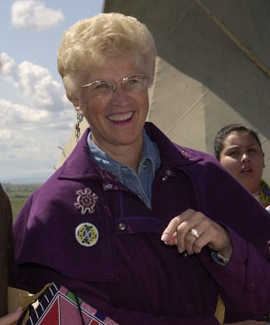
Judy Martz
22nd Governor of Montana

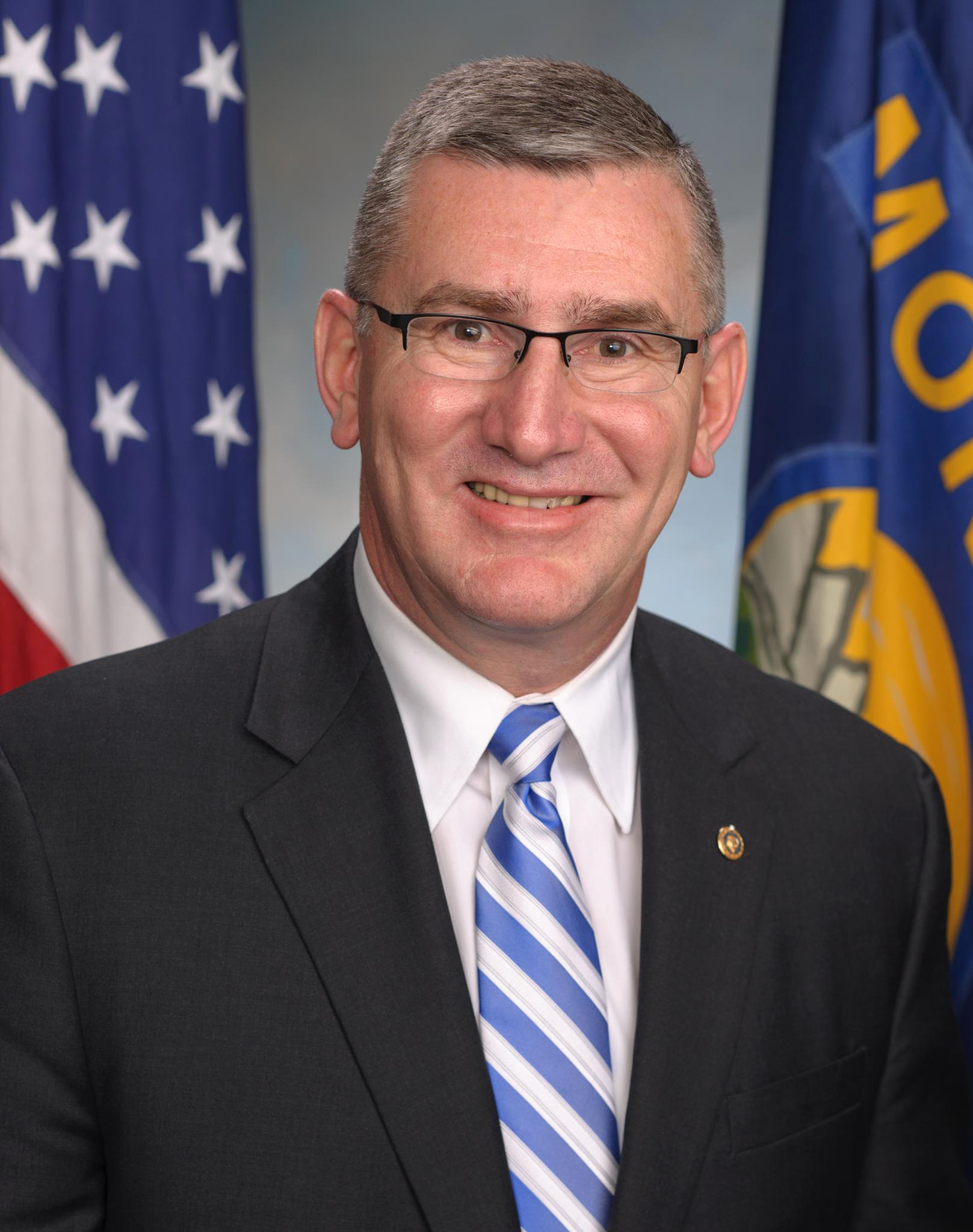
John Walsh
Member of the United States Senate, 2014–2015

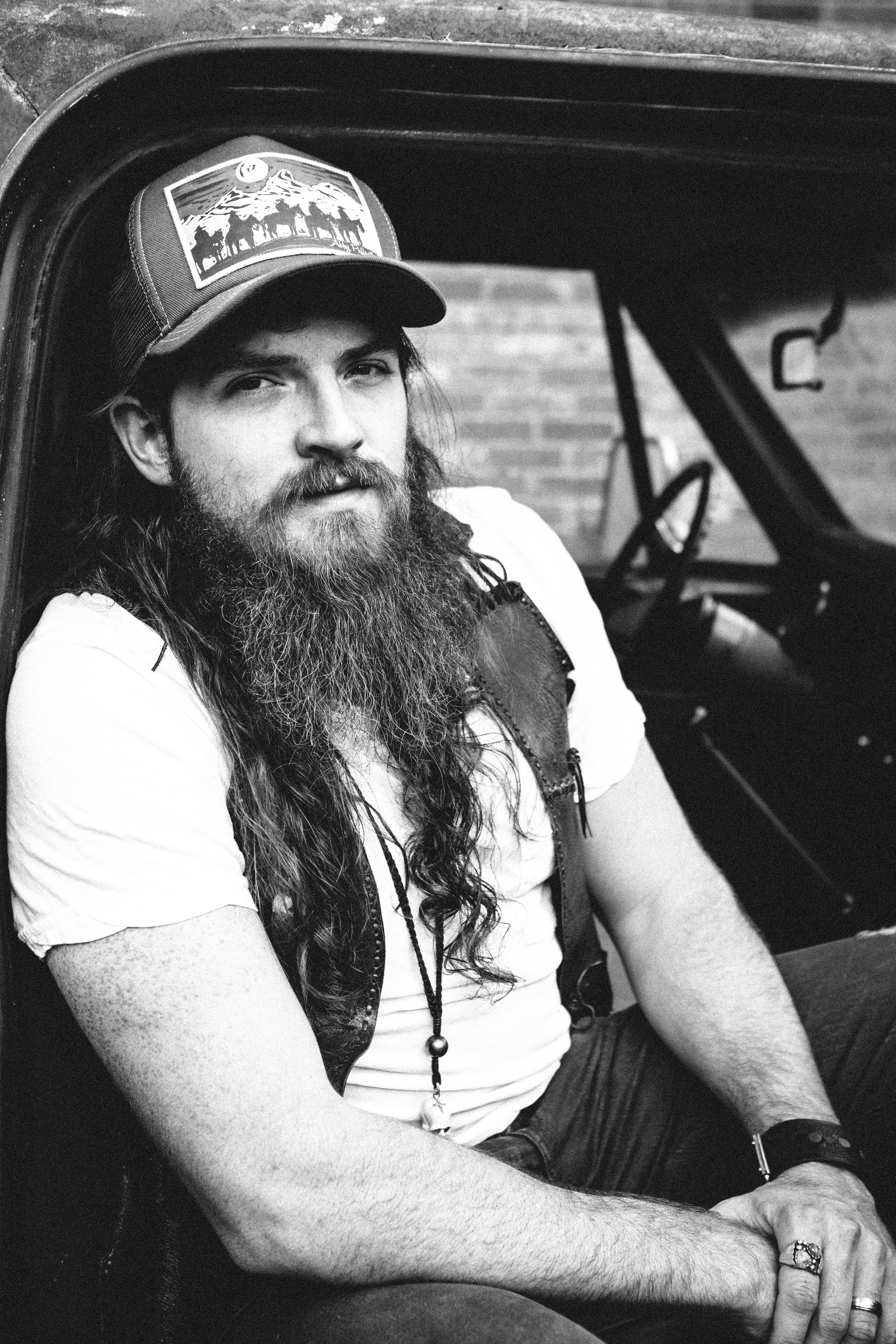
Tim Montana
Singer

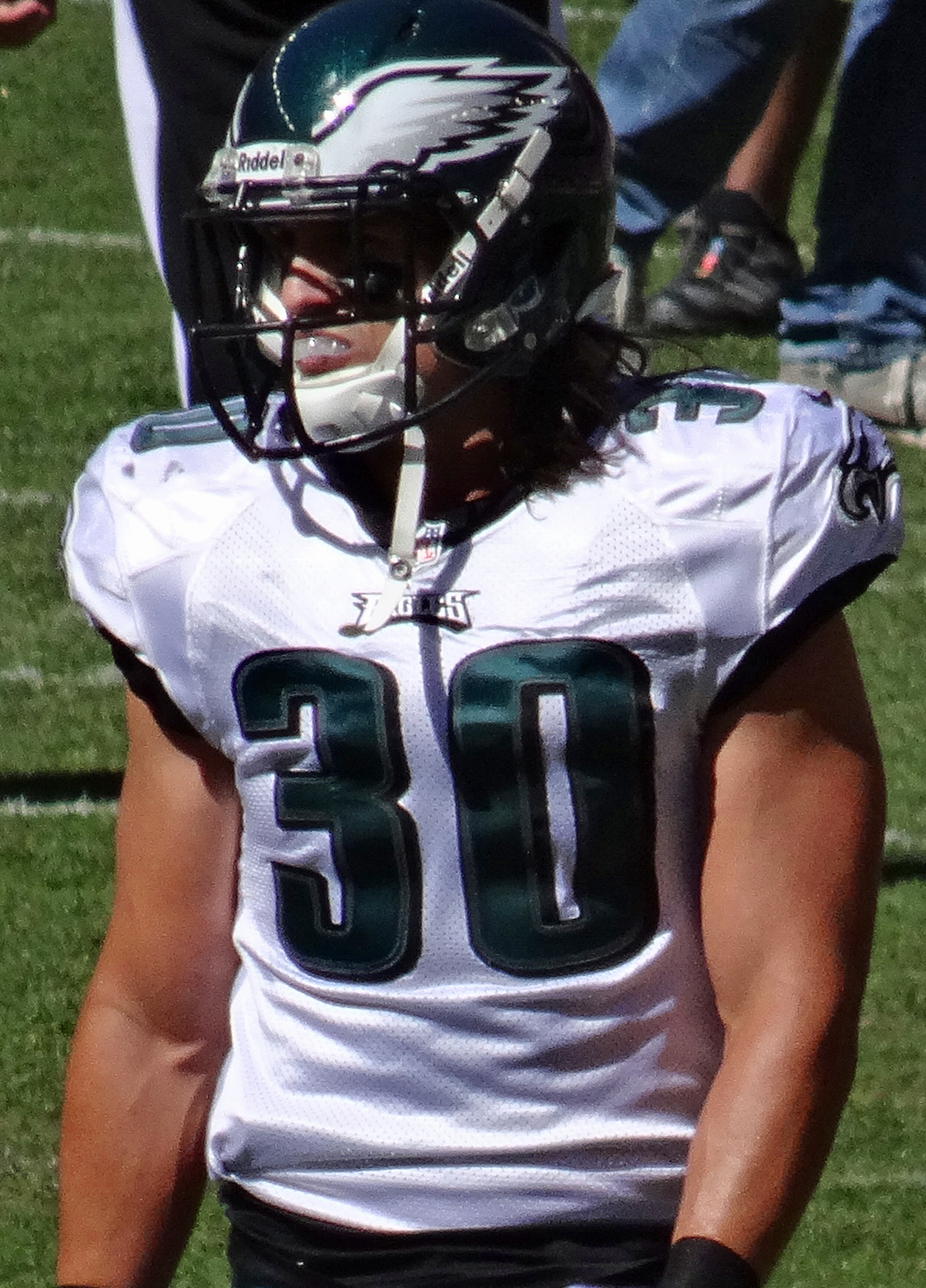
Colt Anderson
NFL player

=== Athletes ===
- Colt Anderson, NFL football player.
- Tommy Mellott, college football quarterback for the Montana State Bobcats
- Bob O'Billovich, scout for the BC Lions.
- Milt Popovich, NFL football player; Chicago Cardinals halfback.
- Pat Ogrin, former NFL football player; Washington Redskins.
- Sonny Holland, former college football coach.

=== Entertainment and arts ===
- Evel Knievel, daredevil.
- Paul B. Lowney, cartoonist.
- Mary MacLane, writer.
- Tim Montana, singer.

=== Law and politics ===
- Mike Cooney, former Lieutenant Governor of Montana.
- George Horse-Capture, Native American activist, curator, National Museum of the American Indian
- Judy Martz, 22nd Governor of Montana
- Stephanie Schriock, president of EMILY's List
- John Walsh, Lieutenant Governor of Montana (2013–2014); United States Senator from Montana (2014–2015).
