= Frank Thorne =

American comic book artist (1930–2021)

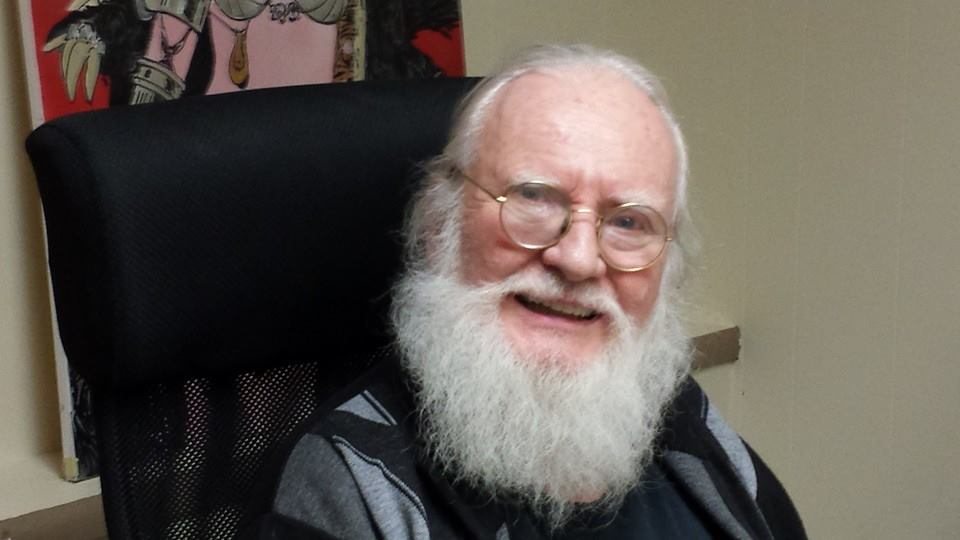
- Thorne in 2017
- Born: Benjamin Franklin Thorne; June 16, 1930 Rahway, New Jersey, U.S.
- Died: March 7, 2021 (aged 90) Scotch Plains, New Jersey, U.S.
- Areas: Cartoonist, Writer
- Notable works: Red Sonja
- Awards: National Cartoonists Society Award (1963); Inkpot Award (1978); Playboy Editorial Award

Benjamin Franklin Thorne (June 16, 1930 – March 7, 2021) was an American comic book artist-writer, best known for the Marvel Comics character Red Sonja.

== Comics ==
Thorne began his comics career in 1948, penciling romance comics for Standard Comics. After graduation, he drew the Perry Mason newspaper strip for King Features, which was followed by more comic book work for Dell Comics. He turned out a multitude of stories for Flash Gordon, Jungle Jim, The Green Hornet, Tom Corbett Space Cadet, Tomahawk, Mighty Samson, Enemy Ace and numerous others. Thorne drew the syndicated comic strip Dr. Guy Bennett / Dr. Duncan from 1956 to 1963 for LaFave Newspaper Features.

Originally drawn by Barry Windsor-Smith for Conan the Barbarian, Red Sonja was transposed from a minor Robert E. Howard 16th-century gunslinger character ("Red Sonya") to a mainstay of the sword and sorcery Conan canon by Roy Thomas. After the character was spun off into a solo feature, Thorne succeeded penciler Dick Giordano in drawing her for Marvel Feature #2 (Jan. 1976), continuing through most of her 1977–79 solo series Red Sonja.

Thorne subsequently created a number of erotic fantasy comics and characters, alongside other works. His works include creating, writing and drawing the features "Moonshine McJugs" for Playboy, "Lann" in Heavy Metal, and "Danger Rangerette" in National Lampoon, and the 1989 miniseries Ribit! for Comico, as well as the Fantagraphics Books/Eros Comix graphic novels Ghita of Alizarr, The Iron Devil, The Devil’s Angel, and The Illustrated History of Union County.

Publishing company Hermes Press has reprinted Lann, Ribit! and Ghita of Alizarr; the latter being reprinted as an archival, nearly full-sized reproduction of the original art.

=== Controversy ===
Prosecutors in the Planet Comics and Science Fiction Store obscenity case in Oklahoma City, Oklahoma, in 1995–96 confiscated Thorne's The Devil's Angel, among other creators' works, as alleged child pornography.

== Other media ==
Thorne wrote and produced the documentary Two Lords and a Lady about Elizabeth Lee "Aunt Betty" Frazee and the Battle of the Short Hills. He wrote the books The Barrington Hall Sketchbook, Drawing Sexy Women, The Crystal Ballroom, and The Alizarrian Trilogy: Nymph, all published by Fantagraphics Books., also Frank Thorne's Battling Beauties (with Howard Leroy Davis as co-writer and which includes Sylph from The Alizarrian Trilogy), Frank Thorne's Ribit, Frank Thornre's Lann, all published by Hermes Press. His work as a writer-illustrator has appeared in Playboy, Hustler, The Golden Magazine, High Times, and Vanity Fair.

== Awards ==
Thorne's awards include a 1963 National Cartoonists Society award in the Comic Book Division, the 1978 San Diego Inkpot Award, the Playboy editorial award for best comic for Moonshine McJugs, Warren Magazine's Best Comic for Ghita of Alizarr, NJ Art Director’s Club.

== Personal life ==
Thorne was known during the 1970s for attending comic book conventions in his persona as The Wizard judging Red Sonja Lookalike Contests. He was born in Rahway, New Jersey, and as of 2010 lived in Scotch Plains, New Jersey.

Thorne wanted to be known as a master in all aspects of cartooning and illustration. This lifetime pursuit was completed with his humorous Moonshine McJuggs cartoons published in Playboy. He acknowledged that he could not have done all that he had done without the support of Marilyn, his wife of sixty-nine years. Despite the controversial nature of some of his material her support was unwavering. This enabled Thorne to work in every area of cartooning and illustration from Sunday School pamphlets to pornography.

He and Marilyn died on the same day: March 7, 2021.
