= Clifford McBride =

American cartoonist

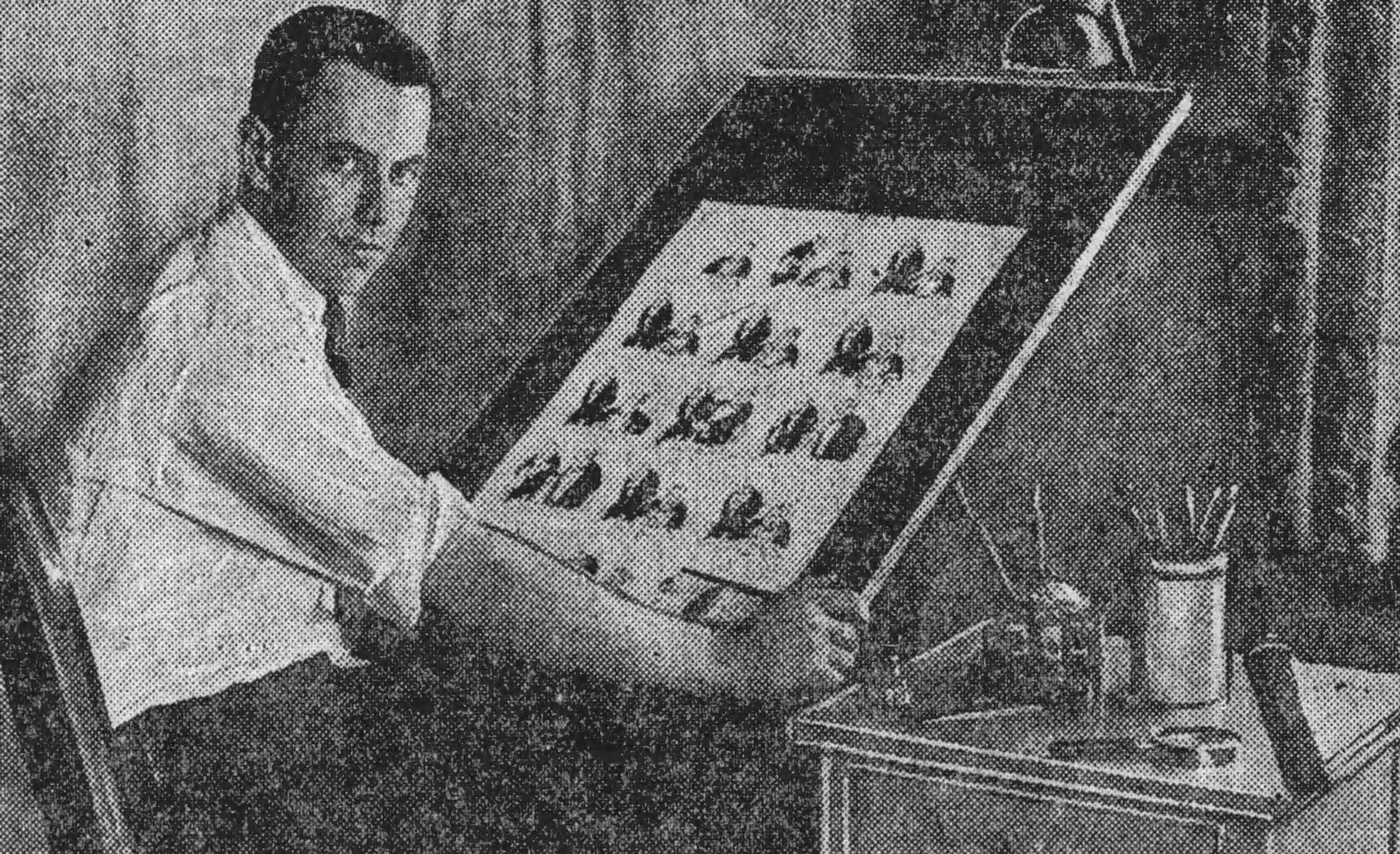
- McBride at the drawing board, c. 1927
- Born: January 26, 1901 Minneapolis, Minnesota, U.S.
- Died: May 21, 1951 (aged 50) Altadena, California, U.S.
- Area: Cartoonist
- Notable works: Napoleon and Uncle Elby
- Spouse: Margot Fischer McBride
- Children: Victoria Margot McBride

Clifford McBride (January 26, 1901 – May 21, 1951) was an American cartoonist best known for his comic strip Napoleon and Uncle Elby.

== Biography ==
Born in Minneapolis, Minnesota, McBride was twice expelled from school because of his drawings in the school paper. His first professional cartoon was published in 1917 in The Los Angeles Times.

When he graduated from Occidental College, he moved to Pasadena, California, beginning his career in 1923 as a staff artist for The Los Angeles Times. The following year, he illustrated humorous fiction for the Chicago Tribune.

=== Comic strips and Napoleon ===
After drawing such features as Insect Life, McBride's Cartoon (1927), and Clifford McBride's Pantomime Comic (1932), he created Elby, a character based on his uncle, Henry Elba Eastman. He soon began to add situations involving Elby's dog, Napoleon.

Drawing for a minor syndicate, Lafave Newspaper Features, McBride began Napoleon as a daily strip on June 6, 1932, adding a Sunday strip in 1933. The following year the title was changed to Napoleon and Uncle Elby. McBride's cartoons appeared in such magazines as Life and Cosmopolitan, and he profited from hardcover reprints, comic books and the licensing of his character as a spokesdog during the 1940s for Red Heart Dog Food. Merchandising included a stuffed toy of Napoleon. Napoleon and Uncle Elby was a 1945 hardcover collection of 116 of McBride's strips.

McBride's assistant on the strip was Roger Armstrong (1917–2007). After McBride's 1951 death in Altadena, California, his second wife, Margot Fischer McBride, wrote the strip, and she hired Armstrong as the illustrator. In 1952, the team switched to the Mirror Enterprises Syndicate in Los Angeles, keeping the strip going for the next eight years.

=== Films ===
Although Napoleon was an Irish Wolfhound, McBride's own dog was Ace, a 190-pound St. Bernard. Ace was sometimes used for promotional purposes with McBride, including two short films, Unusual Occupations (1941) and Artist's Antics (1946).
