= Napoleon and Uncle Elby =

1932–1961 newspaper comic strip

- Clifford McBride's Napoleon
- Author: Clifford McBride (1932–1951); Margot Fischer McBride (1951–1961)
- Illustrator(s): Roger Armstrong (1950–1953, 1958–1960), Joseph Messerli (1953-1956), Ed Nofziger (1956-1958)
- Current status/schedule: Daily and Sunday; concluded
- Launch date: June 6, 1932
- End date: 1960
- Alternate name: Napoleon
- Syndicate(s): Lafave Newspaper Features (1932–1952); Mirror Enterprises Syndicate (1952–1961)
- Genre: Humor

Roger Armstrong, who illustrated the strip in the 1950s.

Napoleon and Uncle Elby was a popular syndicated newspaper comic strip created by Clifford McBride, which launched on June 6, 1932. Over a span of 29 years it was distributed to both American and foreign newspapers. By the mid-1940s, the strip was carried by 80 newspapers.

== Publication history ==
While drawing such features as McBride's Cartoon (1927) and Clifford McBride's Pantomime Comic (1932), McBride introduced Elby, a character based on his uncle, Wisconsin lumberman Henry Elba Eastman. He soon began to add situations involving Elby's dog, Napoleon.

For a minor syndicate, Lafave Newspaper Features, McBride began Napoleon as a daily strip on June 6, 1932. His Sunday strip was added on March 12, 1933, and the following year, the title was changed to Napoleon and Uncle Elby.

McBride's assistant on the strip was former Disney artist Roger Armstrong (1917–2007). After McBride's 1951 death in Altadena, California, his second wife, Margot Fischer McBride, wrote the strip, and she hired Armstrong as the illustrator. In 1952, the team switched to the Mirror Enterprises Syndicate in Los Angeles, keeping the strip going for the next eight years.

The strip was drawn by Joseph Messerli from 1953 to 1956, by Ed Nofziger from 1956 to 1958, and then Armstrong returned for the final two years. The Sunday page ended on November 27, 1955, and the daily strip ended in 1960.

== Characters and story ==
Elby was based on McBride's uncle, Henry Elba Eastman. McBride soon began to add situations involving Elby's dog, Napoleon.

Comics historian Don Markstein described the characters:

Napoleon was a big, clumsy, ungainly dog, most likely an approximation of an Irish wolfhound. As dogs go, he had a remarkably broad facial range, able to convey surprise, dismay, haughty disdain, grudging satisfaction and much more, as recognizable to readers as the expressions of any human character, and yet completely dog-like in every panel. Napoleon's alleged "master", Uncle Elby, was no more able to impose his will on the dog than was Si Keeler on Maud the Mule. The difference was that Maud acted out of pure orneriness, whereas Napoleon was just playful, headstrong, and not overly concerned about any damage he might cause. Uncle Elby wasn't quite what you'd call elderly, but getting pretty close. He was overweight and kind of fussy, just the sort of guy who would be most disconcerted by the antics of a dog like Napoleon — whom he clearly loved, no matter how hard it was to deal with the beast, or how upset he became as a result of those antics. Other than Napoleon, Uncle Elby lived alone, but his young nephew, Willie, was also part of the cast.

== Licensing and merchandising ==
Napoleon became a spokesdog during the 1940s for Red Heart Dog Food. Merchandising included a stuffed toy of Napoleon. Although Napoleon was an Irish Wolfhound, McBride's own dog was Ace, a 190-pound St. Bernard, who sometimes was used for promotional purposes with McBride, including two short films, Unusual Occupations (1941) and Artist's Antics (1946).

== Bibliography ==
- Clifford McBride's Immortal Napoleon and Uncle Elby. 1932.
- Napoleon and Uncle Elby Clifford McBride. 1945.
- Napoleon: A Complete Compilation, 1932-1933. Clifford McBride. Introduction by Jack Herbert. Westport, Connecticut: Hyperion Press, 1977.
