= Paul B. Lowney =

American writer (1917–2007)

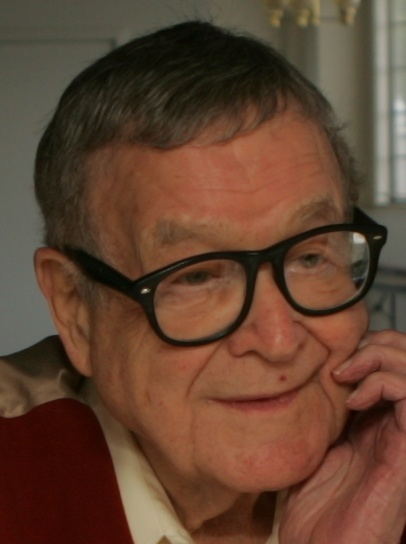
- Lowney in 2005
- Born: March 25, 1917; Butte, Montana, U.S.
- Died: May 12, 2007 (aged 90)
- Education: University of Montana-Missoula
- Occupations: Author, Humorist
- Employer(s): Lowney Advertising; Crown & Lurie Publishers
- Notable work: Gleeb

Paul Benjamin Lowney (March 25, 1917 – May 12, 2007) was a Seattle-based author and humorist. He wrote 29 books and three comic strips, most mixing humor, philosophy, and whimsical illustrations by his frequent collaborator Frank Renlie. Saturday Review described his work by saying, "Sometimes Lowney makes you think and then laugh; and sometimes he makes you laugh and then think."

He also authored non-fiction works on Seattle and his experiences growing up in Butte during the 1930s.

== Biography ==
Paul Lowney was born and raised in Butte, Montana, fourth and youngest child of Lithuanian Jewish parents. He graduated from Butte High School and the University of Montana-Missoula, where he majored in sociology and philosophy. In Seattle, he took graduate studies in philosophy at the University of Washington.

During World War II he served three years in the U.S. Army as an overseas field correspondent for Yank, the Army Weekly.

After leaving the Army in Virginia, he became a staff writer for the American Red Cross at their national headquarters in Washington, D.C.

He moved back to Seattle and worked as a civilian information officer for the Army and then the Navy. During this time he was commissioned a First Lieutenant, Military Intelligence, in the Army Reserve.

Later, under contract to The Seattle Times, he wrote a weekly humor feature for 11 years and also authored several pieces for national magazines.

He also founded Lowney Advertising and Crown & Lurie Publishers, both based in Seattle.

== Writing career ==
In his senior year at Butte High School, Paul Lowney wrote a humor column for his school paper, The Mountaineer, and wrote humor ever after. Someone asked him how he happened to get into writing and he said, “When I was eight, I found a small pencil in my Cracker Jack box and I didn't want to throw it away.”

His humor appeared in Parade, Saturday Review, Reader's Digest, and in scores of newspapers through his syndication with the Los Angeles Times Syndicate, Copley News Service, and the Pacific Media Group.

For 11 years, his humor panel, Gleeb, appeared in The Seattle Times.

His hardback humor books issued by New York publishers include Gleeb, The Big Book of Gleeb, Offbeat Humor, The Best of Offbeat Humor, and The Love Game.

His non-fiction book, At Another Time — Growing up in Butte, is in its ninth printing.

== Bibliography ==
=== Books ===
- At Another Time: Growing up in Butte, with Seattle Supplement, ninth edition, hardcover (2007)
- Especially for Bright People: A Book of Humor and Think (2006)
- Ergo1: A Classic Little Book of Thoughts & Laughter (2002)
- The Love and Dating Game (2002)
- At Another Time: Growing up in Butte, with Seattle Supplement (2002)
- At Another Time: Growing up in Butte (2000)
- Little Lessons from Life, My Professors & My Jewish Mother (1999)
- Toads (1997)
- The Best in Offbeat Humor II: An eclectic work (1996)
- The Pocket Gleeb (1991)
- The Love Game (1988)
- The Best of Gleeb (1982)
- Gleeb VI: The best "Gleebs" from the Seattle Times (1981)
- Gleeb V (1978)
- Gleeb IV (1976)
- The Big Book of Gleeb (1975)
- Seattle: The nation's most beautiful city (1973)
- Gleeb (1973)
- Seattle, nation's most beautiful city (1968)
- The Best of Offbeat Humor (1968)
- No charge for dreaming (1966)
- The world's funniest offbeat humor (1965)
- No charge for dreaming: An unusual little book of sense, nonsense and laughter (1963)
- Scenic Seattle (1962)
- Offbeat Humor (1962)
- Seattle: The nation's most beautiful city (1961)
- This is Hydroplaning (1959)
- Washington, America's most scenic state (1957)
- I'm at North Fort Lewis (1954)

=== Comic Strips ===
- Toads (1997), weekly strip
- Gleeb (1981–85), weekly panel syndicated by the Los Angeles Times Syndicate and Copley News Service
- The Pookas (1977–78), weekly strip
