= Stan Cross =

American-born Australian cartoonist (1888-1977)

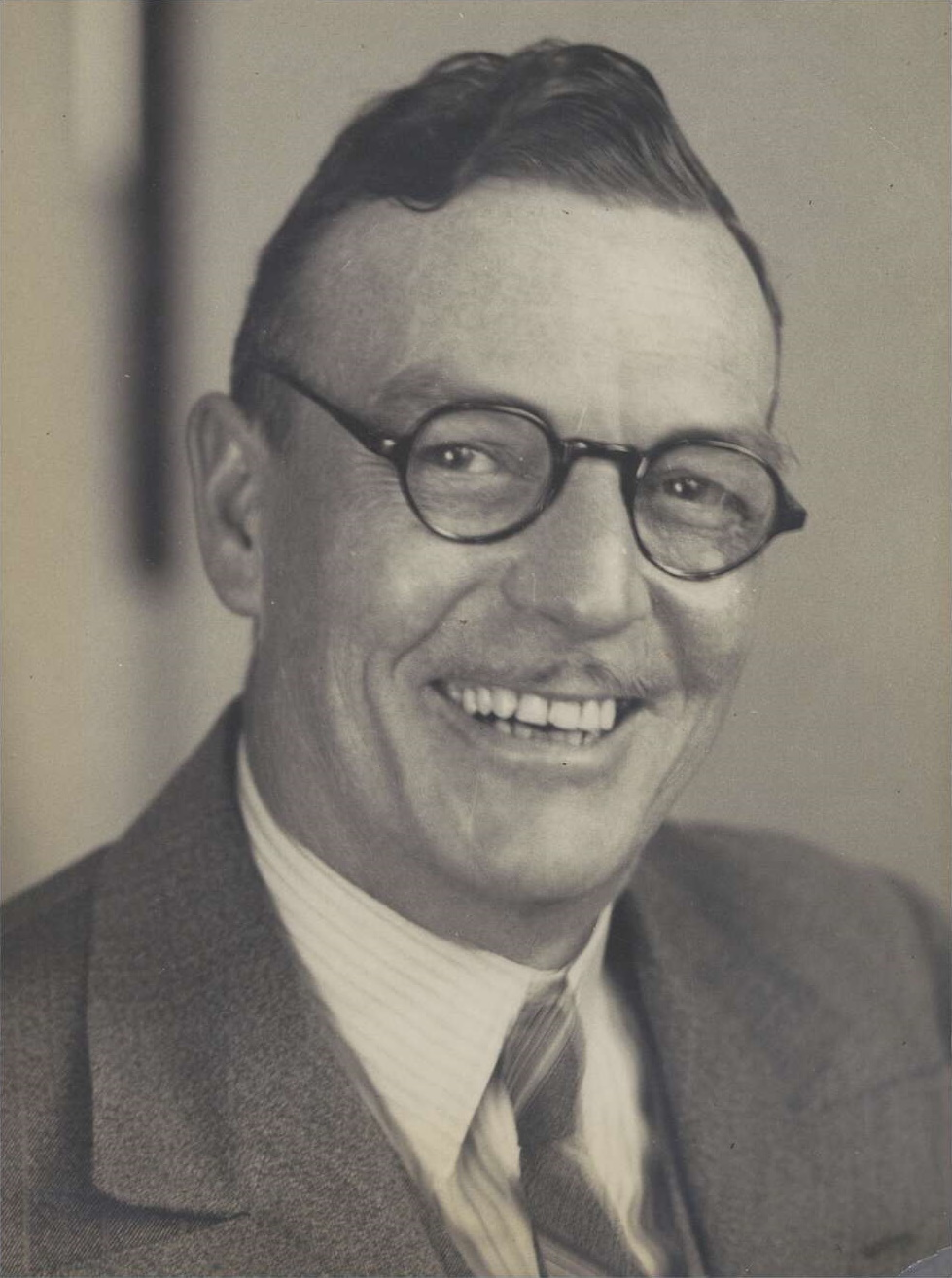
- Portrait of Stan Cross (1935).
- Born: Stanley George Cross; 3 December 1888; Los Angeles, California, United States
- Died: 16 June 1977 (aged 88); Armidale, New South Wales, Australia
- Occupations: Cartoonist, illustrator
- Writing career
- Period: 1920–1970
- Genre: Humour

Stanley George Cross (3 December 1888 – 16 June 1977) was born in the United States but was known as an Australian strip and political cartoonist who drew for Smith's Weekly and the Herald & Weekly Times. Cross is famous for his iconic 1933 "For gorsake, stop laughing: this is serious!” cartoon as well as the Wally and the Major and The Potts cartoon strips.

== Early life and education ==
Cross was the third son born to English-born parents, Theophilus Edwin Cross, builder and architect, and his wife Florence, née Stanbrough, who met in Brisbane, married in Sydney then sought their fortune in the United States. His father hoped to make money there but only found work as a carpenter (he became secretary of the American Carpenters' Union). Cross was born on 3 December 1888 in Los Angeles, California. The family returned to Australia in 1892 when Stan was four years old and settled in Perth, Western Australia.

Cross was a gifted student who attended Perth High School on a scholarship. The University of Adelaide offered him a scholarship but Cross turned it down due to his father's ill-health.

== Early career and London ==
He left school at sixteen and joined the State Government Railways Department as a clerical cadet. He studied art for a number of years during the evenings at Perth Technical School. In 1912, at the age of twenty four, he resigned from his job and, with the financial assistance of his brother, travelled to London to study at Saint Martin's School of Art. During that time, some of his cartoons were accepted by Punch. Before sailing for England, he twice exhibited his paintings and pen-and-ink works, the first time in the West Australian Society of Arts 1913 Annual Exhibition, and the second in March 1914, with another Perth artist, Michael McKinlay.

== Return to Australia, Smith's Weekly ==
On returning to Perth, Cross contributed freelance drawings to the Western Mail and The Sunday Times, and while working as a railways draftsman in 1918, he was offered a job by Ernie Brewer of Smith's Weekly at £5 a week. Cross accepted the position and moved to Sydney in 1919. On 31 July 1920, Cross's first comic strip, The Man Who Waited, was published in Smith's Weekly. That was followed in the next week by the first episode of You & Me. Originally a satire, featuring the characters "Mr Pott" and "Whalesteeth", designed as a means of offering political comment, it was quickly converted into a domestic humour strip. Cross continued to draw the weekly strip for nineteen years until he left Smith's in late December 1939. The strip was taken over by Jim Russell in 1940 and renamed to Mr & Mrs Potts.

In 1928, Cross began another strip in Smith's Weekly, Smith's Vaudevillans, introducing the mis-matched characters of "Rhubarb", an alcoholic sailor, and "Norman", a fop who played the straight man to his drunken partner. Another Stan Cross success was the first "Dad and Dave" cartoons, also for Smith's Weekly. The strip was a straight adaptation of the radio serial, which commenced in 1936, and ran for 2,276 episodes before finishing in 1951.

During his time at Smith's Weekly, Cross established a reputation as a skilled draftsman, particularly in the area of single-panel cartoons. In the 29 July 1933 issue of Smith's Weekly, a Cross cartoon featured two men who had been working on top of a building construction. There has been a mishap, and now one is hanging by his fingers from a girder at a frightening height over a street. His mate, to save himself, has grabbed the trousers of the other, yanking them down over his ankles and, looking directly upwards, is convulsed with laughter, while the other implores: "For gorsake, stop laughing: this is serious!". Editor Frank Marien immediately dubbed it "The Funniest Drawing in the World". Such was the popularity of the cartoon that it was reprinted on a quality paper and distributed throughout Australia, with many also being sent overseas. All through the Depression years, and after, the prints, costing two shillings and sixpence, were framed and hung on walls in work-places, hotel bars, barbers' shops, and even in some shop windows.

Cross became Smith's Weekly's highest-paid artist and second art editor. Short-run series he devised included: Things That Make Stan Cross (political and economic criticism), Places We Have Never Visited (law courts, Parliament, the players' room at a test cricket match, etc.), Museum of the Future and Firsts in Australian History (the first barmaid, the first strike, the first football match).

== The Herald ==
Towards the end of 1939, Smith's Weekly was in financial trouble and Cross was induced by Keith Murdoch to join the Melbourne Herald. Capitalising on his reputation as a comic strip artist, Cross was asked to create a newly daily strip, and he started his most popular strip, The Winks on 20 April 1940. For the first three months, the strip employed a domestic comedy theme and was basically a toned down version of You & Me. The characters "Mr Wink" reflected the role of Mr Potts, while the tall, thin, long-faced character was similar to "Whalesteeth". In the initial stages, the characters were given their own weekly strip, Tidley Winks & Wally. The Winks was only moderately popular until Cross decided to change the strip's direction and take the main characters into the Army. Mr Winks became Major Winks on 15 July 1940 and the strip was renamed Wally and the Major. Over the next thirty years in newspapers throughout Australia, New Zealand and Fiji, and in eighteen annual comic books (c.1943–60), readers were able to enjoy the extraordinary, knock-about adventures and lifestyle of Private Wally Higgins, Major Winks, Pudden Bensen, and a company of comedy players—in the army in World War II and, afterwards, on their North Queensland sugarcane plantation. He continued to produce the strip until failing eyesight forced him to get help with the drawings early in 1970. Carl Lyon started to ink in Cross's pencil drawings. and Lyon eventually took over all the drawing, with Cross writing the stories, and took over completely when Cross retired later that year.

== Organisational affiliations ==
Cross was a foundation member of the Black and White Artists Society (later Club), Sydney, and served as president from 1931 to 1954. Their annual trophy "The Stanley" was named for him, with the award taking the shape of the figures in his classic cartoon, "For gorsake, stop laughing: this is serious".

== Other activities and personal life ==
Cross also wrote books on accountancy, economics and English grammar, and treatises on soil conservation. He painted watercolours and there is some speculation that Cross and George Finey held the first exhibition at David Jones Art Gallery. On 17 November 1924, Cross married a 25-year-old clerk Jessie May Hamilton (died 1972) at the Waverley Methodist Church in Bondi Junction. In 1970, he retired from the Melbourne Herald and joined his family at Armidale, New South Wales, where he died on 16 June 1977 at the age of eighty-eight. The epitaph on his tombstone reads, "Stop laughing, this is serious".

== Sources ==
- Conversation with Stan Cross (sound recording) / as interviewed by Hazel de Berg, 18 August 1969, National Library of Australia
- ACE biographical portraits: the artists behind the comic book characters: the Australian comic book exhibition, Australian comics 1930s–1990s, touring Australia during 1995/96 / edited by Annette Shiell and Ingrid Unger (1994, ISBN 0-7326-0829-5)
- Australian humour in pen and ink / Stan Cross (1921)
- Golden years of cartooning 1920–1940: Stan Cross and 23 other artists whose work appeared in Smith's Weekly / Brenda Rainbow (1998, ISBN 0-9586271-0-X)
- Stop laughing, this is serious!: the life and work of Stan Cross, 1888–1977 / Vane Lindesay (2001, ISBN 0-522-84980-6)
- Wally and the Major / Stan Cross
- John Ryan collection of Australian comic books, ca. 1940–1960 (manuscript)
