= Edward D. Kuekes =

American editorial cartoonist

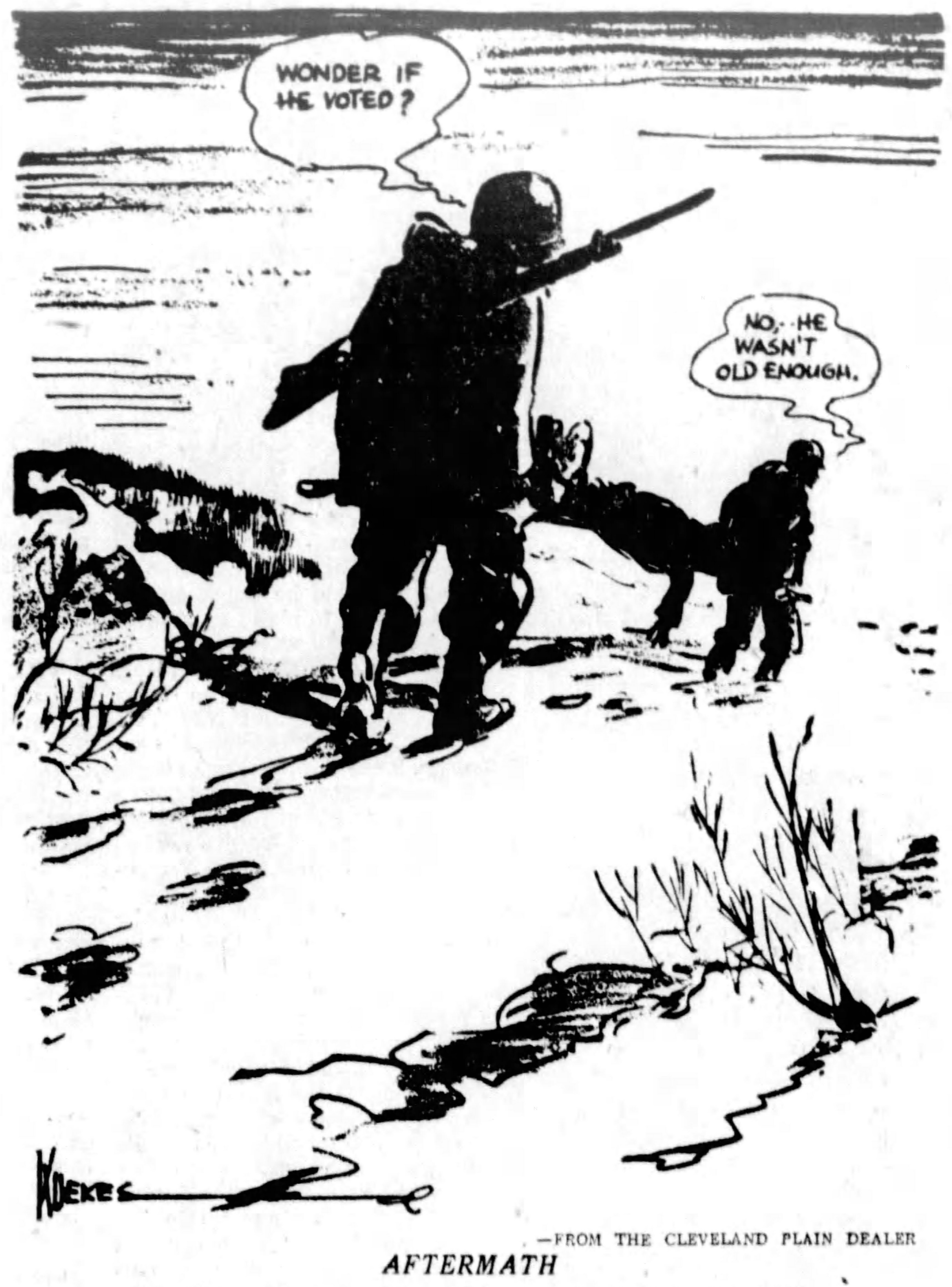
"Aftermath", for which Kuekes received the 1953 Pulitzer Prize for Editorial Cartooning

Edward Daniel Kuekes (February 2, 1901 – January 13, 1987) was an American editorial cartoonist. Working for the Cleveland, Ohio Plain Dealer, he won the 1953 Pulitzer Prize for Editorial Cartooning.

Born in Pittsburgh, Pennsylvania, his family moved to Berea, Ohio in 1913. He graduated from Berea High School in 1918. After graduating Baldwin–Wallace College, he studied art at Cleveland School of Art and the Chicago Academy of Fine Arts. Early influences on his work were Gaar Williams, Ding Darling, and Billy Ireland. His career at the Plain Dealer began in 1922 as understudy to editorial cartoonist Hal Donahey. Kuekes handled general art chores for the Plain Dealer, such as illustrating news events. Over the years he drew a number of regular features for the paper, including a movie-themed feature called Closeups, an editorial cartoon called All in a Week, and a Sunday feature called Cartoonist Looks at the News. For much of the 1940s, his trademark was a rabbit named "The Kernel", which came from his work as an amateur stage magician. Following Donahey's death in 1949, Kuekes became chief editorial cartoonist of the Plain Dealer.

Kuekes won the Pulitzer Prize for a Korean War cartoon called "Aftermath". In the cartoon, two soldiers carry a third on a stretcher. One asks "Wonder if he voted?" while the other replies "No, he wasn't old enough." (In the United States, the voting age was not lowered from 21 to 18 until the passage of the 26th Amendment in 1971.) In addition to the Pulitzer Prize, Kuekes won three Freedoms Foundation medals in 1949, 1950, and 1951, a Silver T-Square in 1953, and a Christopher Award in 1955.

Kuekes also drew a number of comic strips. With writer Olive Ray Scott, he drew the strip Alice in Wonderland and its accompanying strip Knurl the Gnome for United Features Syndicate in 1934. For the Plain Dealer, he drew the Sunday comic strip Funny Fables from 1935 to 1937 and this work was collected in a 1938 book, Funny Fables: Modern Interpretations of Famous Fabulists. With Steve Freely, he drew the daily panel strip Do You Believe for the LaFave Newspaper Features from 1955 to 1962.

Kuekes died in Oklahoma City, Oklahoma.
