= Bristow (cartoon) =

Bristow is a British gag-a-day comic strip created by Frank Dickens about a buying clerk of that name. The series was in continuous publication in the Aberdeen Press & Journal from September 1961 until its last appearance in 2012. With over 10,000 strips made over the decades and running for over 51 years, Bristow is one of the longest running daily cartoon strips by a single author, according to Guinness World Records. The Bristow character is even older than that, having debuted in Dickens's series Oddbod in The Sunday Times in 1960. Due to his popularity he received his own spin-off series soon afterwards. Dickens broke the original record held by Marc Sleen, whose The Adventures of Nero was drawn for 45 years without any assistance. However, even Dickens's record has been broken in his turn by Jim Russell, whose series The Potts ran for 62 years.

== Background ==
The cartoons follow the daily life of a buying clerk who works in the monolithic Chester-Perry building. He is a fantasist and has delusions of grandeur, wishing he were a brain surgeon and a writer. His epic tome Living Death in the Buying Department has yet to find a publisher, but he is not discouraged. He lives in a small bedsit in East Winchley and commutes to work by train, invariably arriving late. Bristow is surrounded by co-workers, Fudge (his overbearing manager), Jones, Hewitt, Dimkins, hapless typist Miss Sunman, master chef Gordon Blue, the Postboy and the ever-gossiping Mrs. Purdy the Tealady. Bristow has a crush on routine visitor Miss Pretty of "Kleenaphone". Another regular visitor is the pigeon who sits on a window ledge. During the winter, the bird travels to a warmer climate where she visits Bristow's counterpart, a black man in a white suit. Bristow invariably holidays at a beach resort known as Funboys Sur La Plage.

== Syndication ==
The strip was widely syndicated in Great Britain and in Australia. It appeared in the Birmingham Evening Mail and, between 1962 and 2001, appeared in the London Evening Standard newspaper. The Melbourne Age and Sydney Morning Herald published the strip from the late 1960s. Since 1966 at least eleven Bristow books have been published in the UK, as well as editions in Australia. A number of collections were published in Italy with the captions translated.

== Radio adaptation ==
"Bristow" was made into a BBC Radio 4 series written by Dickens and starring both Michael Williams as Bristow and Rodney Bewes as his colleague Jones. There were 14 half-hour episodes made from April 1999 to July 2000, with frequent repeats on BBC 7 (now Radio 4 Extra).

== Stage adaptation ==
In 1971 the strip was also adapted into a theatrical play at the ICA in London, co-written and directed by Michael Bakewell and starring Freddie Jones.
