= The Potts =

Australian comic strip

- Author: Stan Cross (1920–1939); Jim Russell (1939–2001)
- Current status/schedule: Concluded; weekly (1920–1950), daily & Sunday (1950–2001)
- Launch date: August 1920
- End date: August 15, 2001
- Alternate name(s): You & Me (1920–1940); Mr & Mrs Potts (1940–1951); Uncle Dick (1961–1962)
- Syndicate(s): LaFave Newspaper Features (1957–1962)
- Publisher: The Sun News-Pictorial
- Genre: Humor

The Potts was an Australian comic strip, created in August 1920 by Stan Cross under the title You & Me. In 1939, it was taken over by Jim Russell, who changed it to its current name. The strip was continued by Russell until his death on August 15, 2001. That made The Potts one of the longest-running comic strips of all time and, with 62 years of syndication, the longest-running cartoon strip drawn by the same single artist, beating the record previously held by Frank Dickens' Bristow, which was in syndication for over 51 years, and Marc Sleen's The Adventures of Nero, which was in syndication for a period of 45 years.

The strip first appeared in The Sun News-Pictorial in Melbourne. From 1957 to 1962, it was syndicated in the United States by LaFave Newspaper Features, renamed Uncle Dick.

== Publication history ==
In August 1920 Stan Cross published the first episode of a comic strip known as You & Me in Smith's Weekly. Cross continued to draw the weekly strip for nineteen years until he left Smith's in late December 1939 to join the Melbourne Herald, taking the character of Whalesteeth with him.

In January 1940 the responsibility for You & Me was given to Cross' staff colleague, Jim Russell, who subsequently lightened the tone of the strip and changed the title to Mr & Mrs Potts. Russell resigned from Smith's Weekly after a dispute with the new editor, and not long after in October 1950 Smith's Weekly ceased publication. In a complex financial arrangement, the Melbourne Herald acquired copyright to Mr & Mrs Potts and Russell resumed drawing the strip as a daily.

The modified Mr & Mrs Potts was sold to The Herald and Weekly Times group, first as a daily, then as a Sunday. The new version, The Potts, first appeared in The Sun News-Pictorial on 23 January 1951, and in most other Australian states shortly afterwards. In October 1953, with the merger in Sydney of the Sunday Sun and the Sunday Herald, the strip moved to the newly-created Sun-Herald. By 1958, it had become an international strip, with an estimated daily circulation of 15 million, appearing in New Zealand, Turkey, Canada, Finland, Sri Lanka, and 35 United States newspapers.

In 1976, Russell retired from the Melbourne Herald as a writer and cartoonist, but continued to produce The Potts under a special arrangement which saw the copyright to the strip transferred to him.

== Characters and story ==
Initially the strip only featured two characters, Pott and Whalesteeth, and was designed as a means of offering political comment. The name of the first was derived from rhyming slang in which "the old pot and pan" stood for "the old man"; the name of the second referred to the character's prominently-displayed teeth, which, when he grinned or grimaced, took possession of the entire lower portion of his face. The political nature of the comic was short-lived and Cross was asked to continue it as a domestic humour strip.

Mrs. Potts was introduced in November 1920, and with her came the marital disputes and slanging matches which were to characterise the strip under Cross. In terms of drinking, arguing, swearing and displays of bad temper, You & Me remains unique in Australian comic book history and pre-dated Andy Capp by almost 40 years.

Under Russell, the editors insisted that the strip become "more genteel", so he introduced new characters. By 1951 the characters were: John and Maggie Potts; their neighbour Whalesteeth; their daughter Ann and son-in-law Herb; grandchildren Bunty and Mike; Maggie's Uncle Dick; and Rodger Codger. Later Ann, Herb and Rodger disappeared, and Mike's friend Muggsy was added.

Using Uncle Dick, who was a good-natured scrounger, Russell felt he could "sneak" into the strip the less attractive elements that had been excised from the main characters. Russell once said, "Uncle Dick is the eternal bum in the family... never wants to work. Borrows money... doesn't want to pay it back; boasts to the kids. A real ol' bullshit artist, a WC. Fields type." Often seen as semi-autobiographical, Uncle Dick was apparently initially based on the character Sheridan Whiteside in the 1941 film, The Man Who Came to Dinner, although Russell later wryly admitted: "I’ve grown more like Uncle Dick and Uncle Dick has grown more like me. My wife says he is me".
