= Loose Parts =

American comic strip by Dave Blazek

- The cover of the first Loose Parts collection, 2001.
- Author(s): Dave Blazek
- Illustrator(s): John Gilpin (1999–2001); Dave Blazek (2001–present)
- Current status/schedule: ongoing, daily
- Launch date: April 20, 1998
- Syndicate(s): Andrews McMeel Syndication (June 1, 2022–present); The Washington Post Writers Group (September 25, 2014–May 31, 2022); Tribune Media Services (December 2000–September 24, 2014); Los Angeles Times Syndicate (April 20, 1998–December 2000)
- Publisher(s): Dave Blazek
- Genre(s): Gag, humor

Loose Parts is a daily single-panel comic strip by Dave Blazek. It is similar in tone, content, and style to Gary Larson's The Far Side, involving Theatre of the Absurd-style themes and characters. Loose Parts is currently syndicated by Andrews McMeel Syndication and appears in newspapers across the country and overseas.

Loose Parts was nominated for Best Newspaper Panel Cartoon division award in the 2010 National Cartoonists Society Reuben Awards. After being nominated an additional three more times, it won the award in 2019, repeating in 2020.

== History ==
Loose Parts began in 1998 as a collaborative effort between Dave Blazek (the writer) and John Gilpin (the illustrator). Both men worked in the marketing department at The Philadelphia Inquirer and Philadelphia Daily News.

The strip was originally syndicated by the Los Angeles Times Syndicate; it moved to Tribune Media Services in late December 2000 when Tribune Publishing bought the Los Angeles Times.

In 2001 Gilpin stopped drawing for the single-panel cartoon and Blazek took up those duties as well; he now writes and draws Loose Parts.

Blazek moved Loose Parts to The Washington Post Writers Group (WPWG) starting with the September 25, 2014 cartoon. In early 2022, the WPWG announced it was winding down its comic strip syndication service; soon afterward, Blazek moved Loose Parts to Andrews McMeel Syndication.

== Collections ==
- amusing thingies (2024)
- Magnificent Stupidity (2021)
- Quirky Rectangles of Mirth (2018)
- oddfish sandwich (2014) - reprinted 2024
- Attack of the Chortling Stomach (2011)
- Weird Things in Small Boxes (2008) – ISBN 1-58822-061-3
- Two Hundred Some Odd Cartoons (2006) – ISBN 1-58822-053-2
- Parts of My Brain (2003) – ISBN 1-58822-133-4
- Loose Upon The World (2001) – ISBN 1-58822-006-0
