= Los Angeles Times Syndicate =

Defunct print syndication service

- Formerly: Mirror Enterprises Syndicate (late 1940s–early 1960s); Los Angeles Times Mirror Syndicate
- Type: Syndication
- Industry: Media
- Founded: c. 1949; 77 years ago
- Defunct: 2000; 26 years ago
- Fate: merged into Tribune Media Services
- Headquarters: Los Angeles, United States
- Area served: United States
- Key people: Rex Barley (manager), Richard S. Newcombe (VP and GM, 1978–1984), J. Willard Colston (President)
- Services: columns, news and feature services, editorial cartoons and comic strips, online products
- Owner: Times Mirror Company
- Parent: Los Angeles Times
- Divisions: General Features Corp. (1967–1974)

The Los Angeles Times Syndicate was a print syndication service that operated from c. 1949 to 2000. Owned by the Times Mirror Company, it also operated the Los Angeles Times Syndicate International; together the two divisions sold more than 140 features in more than 100 countries around the world. Syndicated features included Pulitzer Prize-winning commentators and columnists, full news and feature services, editorial cartoons and comic strips, online products and photo and graphics packages.

== History ==
The syndicate was founded in c. 1949 by the Times Mirror Company as the Mirror Enterprises Syndicate. In the early 1960s the name was changed to the Los Angeles Times Syndicate, and was operated as a department of the Los Angeles Times newspaper. Rex Barley was manager of the syndicate from 1950 until at least 1968.

The syndicate acquired the New York City-based independent syndicate General Features Corp. in 1967 for approximately $1 million, retaining it as a separate entity. In 1974, the L.A. Times Syndicate absorbed General Features into its own operations.

In mid-1987, the Los Angeles Times Syndicate was the fifth-ranked syndication service, with 85 features.

The Tribune Company acquired the Times Mirror Company in early 2000; upon completion of the merger, the L.A. Times Syndicate became a division of Tribune Media Services. The New York office closed June 1, 2000, while the Salt Lake City office closed on August 31, 2000. International work continues to be done in Los Angeles through the Tribune Content Agency. Several of the employees were offered follow on jobs with Tribune Media Services after the closing. The only strip that appeared to survive the merger was Dave Blazek and John Gilpin's Loose Parts.

== Comic strips and panels ==
Neither iteration of the syndicate ever produced a breakout comic strip; the most successful strips — Luther, Napoleon and Uncle Elby, Mr. Tweedy — tended to be inherited from other syndicates. Most Mirror Enterprise strips didn't last more than two or three years, and the company appeared to give up on syndicating comic strips after c. 1961.

After a five-year hiatus, the newly named Los Angeles Times Syndicate picked up the distribution of comic strips again in 1965. It had a similar lack of long-term success, with most strips not lasting more than three of four year in syndication. The most popular strips that originated with the L.A. Times Syndicate were Ed Nofziger's Animalogic (11 years in syndication) and Lee Nordling's Sherman on the Mount (9 years).

The syndicate also distributed Lou Grant's editorial cartoons from the 1950s through the 1980s.

=== Mirror Enterprises Syndicate (c. 1949–c. 1961) ===
- Annie Oakley by Bill Ziegler (1950–1952)
- Dragnet by Mel Keefer and Bill Ziegler (1953–1954)
- Hopalong Cassidy by Royal King Cole and Dan Spiegle (1949–1951)
- The Life of General Ike by "staff artist" Bill MacArthur (1952) — "36-installment story strip" on the life of Dwight D. Eisenhower
- My Friend Irma by Stan Lee, Jack Seidel, and Dan DeCarlo (1951–1952)
- Napoleon and Uncle Elby by Margot McBride (widow of strip creator Clifford McBride), Roger Armstrong, and Joe Messerli (1952–1961) — acquired from LaFave Newspaper Features
- Soapy Waters by George Stallings & Kay Wright (February 7, 1955 – April 20, 1957)
- Times Have Changed? by P. S. Clayton & Jack Chick (Nov. 16, 1953 – 1955)
- Too Funny for Words by Courtney Dunkel (June 12 1950 – 1952) — wordless daily strip

=== Los Angeles Times Syndicate (1965–2000) ===
- Animalogic by Ed Nofziger (1967–1978)
- Bonzer U by Kearney Egerton (1968)
- Bush League by John Bianchi and Ken Shaw (1975)
- Dallas by writer Jim Lawrence and artists Paul Chadwick, Ron Harris, and Deryl Skelton (1981–1984)
- The DeBrees by Charles Barsotti and Kipp Schuessler (1975)
- Drawn Out by Bill and Eric Teitelbaum (1980)
- Dr. Katz, Professional Therapist by Bill Braudis and Dave Blazek, with artwork by Dick Truxaw (March 1997 – January 2000)
- Et Tu by Dan Harpe (1975-1976)
- Gerties Gig by Suzanne Farrow (1976)
- Gleeb by Paul B. Lowney (1981-1985)
- Grace and Looie by Al Wiseman (1966, 1973)
- Guindon by Dick Guindon (1978–1981)
- Homer's Groaners by Ed Stanoszek (1978-1979)
- Jeff Cobb by Pete Hoffman (1974–1978) — acquired from General Features Corp.
- Lady Chatter by Nellie Caroll (1965–1966)
- Legend of Bruce Lee by Sharman DiVono, Fran Matera, and Dick Kulpa (1982–1983)
- Lord, I Said by Hank Hartmann and Martha Merrill (1978)
- Loose Parts by Dave Blazek & John Gilpin (April 1998–December 2000; moved to Tribune Media Services)
- Luther by Brumsic Brandon Jr. (1970–1986) — inherited from Newsday Specials
- Mr. Tweedy by Ned Riddle (1974–1988) — continued from General Features Corp.
- Modesty Blaise (1976-1980)
- My Stars by Ken Bruns (1976)
- The Noob (1994)
- Phoebe's Place by Bill Schorr (1990–1991)
- Sherman on the Mount by Lee Nordling (1980–1989)
- Star Trek by Thomas Warkentin, Sharman DiVono, Ron Harris, Larry Niven, Martin Pasko, Padraic Shigetani, Bob Meyers, Ernie Colón, Gerry Conway, and Dick Kulpa (Dec. 2, 1979 – Dec. 3, 1983)
- Star Wars by Archie Goodwin, Al Williamson, Russ Manning, Russ Helm, Steve Gerber, and Alfredo Alcala (1979–1984)
- The Virtue of Vera Valiant by writer Stan Lee and artists John Buscema and Frank Springer (1976-1977)
- Walt Kelly's Pogo by Larry Doyle and Neal Sternecky, Peter Sternecky, and Carolyn Sternecky (Jan. 1989 – Nov. 1993)
- Why We Say by Robert Morgan and Pete Hoffman (1974–1978) — continued from General Features Corp.

== See also ==
- Los Angeles Times–Washington Post News Service
