= Tim Montana =

Singer songwriter

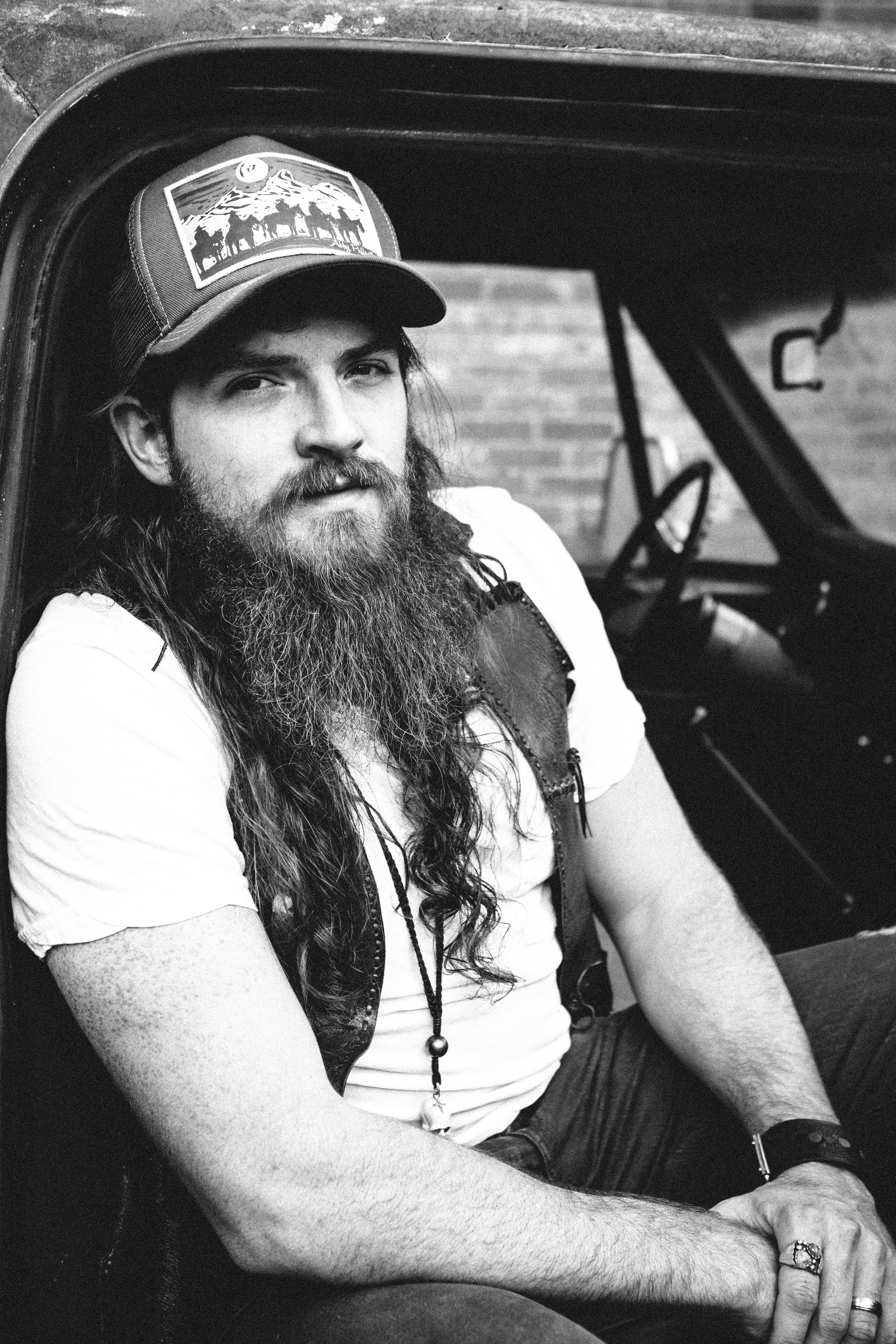
- Tim Montana

Background information
- Born: January 5, 1985 (age 41); Kalispell, Montana, U.S.
- Genres: Country rock; Southern rock
- Occupations: Musician; singer; songwriter; guitarist
- Instruments: Vocals; guitar
- Years active: 2003–present
- Labels: CD Baby; RED Distribution; Music Knox Records/BMG
- Website: www.timmontana.com

Tim Montana (born January 5, 1985) is an American singer, songwriter and guitarist signed to Music Knox Records/BBR Music Group part of BMG Rights Management.

== Early life ==
Tim Montana was born on January 5, 1985, in Kalispell, Montana and raised in Butte, Montana. Tim was given his first guitar at the age of six. Since his family's trailer had no electricity, Tim taught himself to play by candlelight. He later performed in school talent shows. After graduating from Butte High School in 2003, he moved to Los Angeles to study music.

== Musical career ==
It was while living in Los Angeles where Tim met guitarist and producer Johnny Hiland and with Hiland's encouragement moved to Nashville and began playing country and southern rock. His debut album, Iron Horse, was produced by Hiland (who also played guitar and sang backup) and released on the CD Baby label on August 21, 2007.

Earlier that same year, late-night talk show host David Letterman met Montana prior to Montana's Independence Day concert in Choteau, Montana. Months later, Letterman personally invited Montana to appear on The Late Show with David Letterman. Montana performed his song "Butte, America" on the October 17, 2008, program broadcast.

In 2013, Montana recruited guitarist Kyle Rife, drummer Brian Wolff, and bassist Bryce Paul to perform as Tim Montana and the Shrednecks. During a studio session on September 11, 2013, Montana was introduced to ZZ Top founder Billy Gibbons. Their meeting resulted in an impromptu songwriting collaboration, during which the two co-wrote and recorded the single "This Beard Came Here to Party." The Boston Red Sox (known at the time for beards they had grown during the playoffs) adopted the song as their anthem during the lead-up to the 2013 World Series. The Shrednecks and Gibbons recorded a custom version for the post-season (with lyrics referencing Red Sox highlights and Boston landmarks). Montana and the band later returned to sing The Star-Spangled Banner at Fenway Park at a May 28, 2013, ceremony honoring the winning 2004 World Series Red Sox team.

Montana and Gibbons would go on to share credits on three other songs: "Fifty Fifty," "Weed and Whiskey," and "Rust and Red." The last of these received its broadcast debut during the Fox News show The Five during an interview with Navy SEAL Team 6 member Robert J. O'Neill, subject of the Fox News documentary The Man Who Killed Osama bin Laden. O’Neill, a fellow native of Butte, had previously become acquainted with Montana through O’Neill's brother Tom, a radio DJ and early supporter of Montana's music. Robert J. O'Neill later featured prominently in the 2017 music video for Montana's single "Hillbilly Rich".

Following the release of "This Beard Came Here to Party," Gibbons invited Tim Montana to open for ZZ Top on tour. Tim Montana and the Shrednecks have continued to appear with ZZ Top and opened for Kid Rock on various tour dates during the summer of 2016.

On February 24, 2016, Tim Montana released the album Tim Montana and the Shrednecks, featuring Gibbons on four tracks.

Tim Montana released the single "Hillbilly Rich" on September 8, 2017. He released a video for the song on September 19 which features friend Robert J. O'Neill and "Streetbike" Tommy Passemante from MTV's Nitro Circus. In their review of the video, Rolling Stone wrote that its "aspirational swagger is perfectly on message for Montana's eclectic musical influences". Actor Charlie Sheen took an interest in the video stating on Twitter "this is a stone-cold masterpiece! my man is flat out Killin the Game" to his millions of followers. Shortly after Tim met Charlie in person, Charlie went on to write and direct Tim's music video "Mostly Stoned" which created a press storm that ultimately led to Tim signing with Music Knox Records/BBR Music Group which is part of the BMG Rights Management family.

As a songwriter Montana co-wrote "Tennessee Mountain Top" and "Greatest Show on Earth" for Kid Rock's 2017 "Sweet Southern Sugar" album. Both of which went on to chart in the top 40. He also co-wrote Travis Tritt's "Smoke in a Bar", Billy F Gibbons "I was a Highway" and Michael Ray's "Higher Education" which featured Montana, Billy F Gibbons, Lee Brice and Kid Rock.

His album Savage was ranked by Loudwire as the 11th best rock album of 2024.

== Personal life ==
Montana is a vocal supporter of U.S. military veterans. After watching the film American Sniper (which tells the story of the late U.S. Navy SEAL Chris Kyle), Montana became involved in the welfare of veterans suffering from Posttraumatic stress disorder. He approached Gibson guitars to create a custom Chris Kyle guitar, decorated with Kyle's skull-and-crosshairs logo. The guitar was auctioned off, raising $117,500 for the Guardians of Heroes Foundation, helping wounded U.S. soldiers.

Montana and his wife Danielle are the parents of four children and currently reside in Nashville, Tennessee.

== Discography ==
=== Studio albums ===
- Iron Horse (2008)
- A Different Kind of Country (2010)
- Tim Montana and the Shrednecks (2016)
- American Thread (2020)
- Reno (EP) (2022)
- Long Shots (2022)
- Savage (2024)
- Entire State of Tim Montana (2026)

=== Singles ===
Title	Year	Peak chart positions			Album
Title	Year	US Hard Rock	US Main.	US Airplay	Album
"Butte, America"	2008	—	—	—	Iron Horse
"Rust and Red" (featuring Billy Gibbons)	2014	—	—	—	Tim Montana and the Shrednecks
"This Beard Came Here to Party" (with Billy Gibbons)	2016	—	—	—	Tim Montana and the Shrednecks
"Weed and Whiskey"	2016	—	—	—	Tim Montana and the Shrednecks
"Amarula Sun" (with Mac McAnally)	2017	—	—	—	Non-album single
"Mostly Stoned"	2019	—	—	—	American Thread
"Hillbilly Rich"	2020	—	—	—	American Thread
"American Thread"	2020	—	—	—	American Thread
"Bury Me by the Bonfire"	2020	—	—	—	American Thread
"Quarantine" (with Mat Best)	2020	—	—	—	Non-album single
"Be a Cowboy"	2021	—	—	—	Long Shots
"Devil You Know"	2023	16	5	12	Savage
"Savage"	2024	—	7	17	Savage
"Die Today"	2024	—	—	—	Savage
"Shut Me Out"	2024	—	—	—	Savage
"Break Me Down"	2026	—	14	35	Entire State of Tim Montana
"Brown Sugar" (feat. Billy F. Gibbons and Slash)	2026	—	—	—	Entire State of Tim Montana
"Long Long Year"	2026	—	—	—	Entire State of Tim Montana

=== Music videos ===
List of music videos, showing year released and directors
Title	Year	Director(s)
"Butte, America"	2008	Unknown
"Too Far Gone"	2012	Unknown
"This Beard Came Here to Party"	2013	Unknown
"Glass and Chicken Wire"	2017	Unknown
"Hillbilly Rich"	2017	Brad Rea
"American Thread"	2019	Spidey Smith
"Mostly Stoned"	2019	Charlie Sheen
"Bury Me By the Bonfire"	2020	Michael Monaco
"Do It Fast"	2020	Unknown
"Be a Cowboy"	2021	Unknown
"American Dream"	2022	Unknown
"Devil You Know"	2023	Unknown
"Savage"	2024	Unknown
"Get You Some"	2024	Unknown
"Death Row"	2024	Unknown
"Ain't Comin' Down"	2025	Unknown
"Break Me Down"	2026	Unknown
"Watch Me Drown"	2026	Richard Gray
