= Rick Brookes =

British cartoonist

- Born: 16 June 1948 (age 77); Bangor, Gwynedd, Wales
- Education: Salford Art School Manchester
- Known for: Painter, cartoonist
- Patrons: Giles, Low and Jak

Rick Brookes (born 16 June 1948) is a British satirical cartoonist. Having studied art at Salford Art School, Manchester, he worked first as an assistant art editor for Mirabelle magazine and then as a graphic artist and designer for IPC magazines such as Woman's Own, Woman's Realm and Ideal Home.

Brookes was an illustrator and staff cartoonist at the Evening Standard from 1977, signing his strips first "Rick Brookes" then "Brookes". He worked alongside Jak for eighteen years, deputising for him In 1994 Brookes began contributing to the Daily Express taking over from Giles, using the signature "Brook", and he kept the same signature after he moved to The Sun in 1996, taking over from Tom Johnston.

Brookes's cartoons appear regularly in newspapers such as News of the World, Mail on Sunday, The American and Punch, and is especially popular on Metro, with his series THIS LIFE. He also worked on the Allied Lyons advertising campaign for Saatchi & Saatchi. Greatly influenced by Giles, Low and Jak, Brookes also admires Oliphant, Matt and Mac. He is reported as drawing his sketches with a Swan fountain pen and flexible nib, just so that he can be suppler in his drawing. He used to hide a rook in his drawings "because there is a rook hidden in 'Brookes'".
