= Jim Russell (cartoonist) =

Australian cartoonist (Born 26 March 1909)

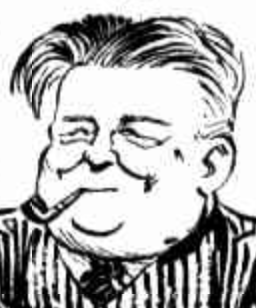
- Jim Russell by Frank Dunne (published in 1932).
- Born: James Newton Russell; 26 March 1909; Campsie, New South Wales, Australia
- Died: 15 August 2001 (aged 92); Sylvania, New South Wales, Australia
- Occupations: Cartoonist, illustrator
- Writing career
- Pen name: Mick Newton
- Period: 1920s–1990s

James Newton Russell AM MBE (26 March 1909 – 15 August 2001) was an Australian cartoonist who drew The Potts for 62 years.

Russell has entered the Guinness Book of Records for drawing the same comic strip singlehandedly without any assistance for a period of over 62 years, beating the record previously held by Frank Dickens' Bristow, which was in syndication for over 51 years, and Marc Sleen's The Adventures of Nero, which was in syndication for a period of 45 years.

Jim's brother Dan Russell was also a cartoonist.

== Biography ==
Russell was born in Campsie, New South Wales, the son of William John "Billy" Russell, a foreman plumber with the Sydney City Council, the president of the New South Wales Plumbers' Union, the national secretary of the Australian Plumbers and Gasfitters Employees Union, and unsuccessful Australian Labor Party candidate for the seats of Parkes and Canterbury, who was killed in a workplace accident in 1915. His mother Catherine Elizabeth (née Diggs), remarried in 1926 and was one of the first two-woman members of an Australian Upper House of Parliament. Russell was educated at Tempe Technical School and Christian Brothers' High School, Lewisham In 1924 at age 14 he began work as a copy boy on the Daily Guardian before transferring later that year to Smith's Weekly, working as an art room messenger boy to Stan Cross. Russell also studied at the Julian Ashton Art School in Sydney, for six years, while working at various jobs, including a box office attendant at the Sydney Stadium. This led to a brief boxing career, which included winning all five bouts as a welterweight at the Sydney Stadium. During this time he improved his drawing, with sketches he made of notable boxers being published in various Sydney papers. In 1926 the head artist of Fox Films offered to tutor Russell in the basics of art, for which he paid £100 and worked unpaid there for two years.

Russell became Australia's youngest political cartoonist, when in 1928 (at the age of nineteen) he got a job as cartoonist on the Sydney Sunday News until the paper folded in 1931. Russell briefly went to the Referee as sports caricaturist until he rejoined Smith's Weekly and by 1933 was Australia's youngest daily cartoonist, In 1939 he temporarily abandoned cartooning and accompanied the Australian Davis Cup team to the United States as a tennis writer. The team won the cup just as World War II broke out. Russell tried to enlist in the Royal Australian Air Force, unsuccessfully.

When Stan Cross left Smith's in 1940 Russell succeeded him as art editor and also took over drawing Cross's comic strips, including You and Me, which he renamed Mr and Mrs Pott, and from 1950, The Potts. Through the war years Russell was responsible for two satirical strips, Adolf, Herman and Musso (which made fun of Adolf Hitler, Hermann Göring and Benito Mussolini) and Schmit der Sphy. He won 1st prize in the Voluntary Services section in the National Gallery of Victoria's 1945 "Australia at War" exhibition.

Russell branched out into comic books during the 1940s when import restrictions gave Australian comics a lion's share of the market. At the beginning of 1947, Jim and his older brother, Dan, began their own publishing company, All-Australian Comics. The lead title of the company was Tex Morton's Wild West Comics, starring the popular country music singer. Like many Australian comics of the time, it was a copy of American material, in this case, featuring cowboy actors such as Roy Rogers and Gene Autry. Tex Morton was always featured in a lead-off story along with his mates Jacky, Shorty and Slim, drawn by Dan Russell. For the first two years companion features were Keith Chatto's Bunny Allen, Les Dixon's Alfie the Jackaroo and a series of bush yarns by Jack Hemming. Early in 1949 they added another title, Kanga's K.O. Comics, with the lead strip drawn by Russell, who used the pseudonym 'Mick Newton'. Russell also used the pseudonym on a revised version of Wanda Dare in Tex Morton Comics (the earlier version of Wanda Dare, a lady reporter, having previously been drawn by Dan).

In the middle of 1950 All-Australian Comics ran into financial difficulties due to rising production costs and the company folded by the end of the year. Russell resigned from Smith's Weekly after a dispute with the new editor, and not long after, in October 1950, Smith's Weekly folded. By a complex financial arrangement, the Melbourne Herald had acquired copyright to The Potts, and he resumed drawing the strip in its new role as a daily

Russell also wrote film reviews and other articles, was a radio and television personality, a publisher of dancing and music magazines and ran two travel agencies.

In 1924, Russell was one of the founders of the Black and White Artists' Club. He succeeded Cross as president in 1955–57, then again in 1965–73. He won the Club's first Silver Stanley in 1985 for his contribution to black and white art, was appointed its patron in 1984 and a life member in 1991. In 1993 he was elected a member of the United States National Cartoonists Society, the only Australian ever to receive this honour.

== Personal ==
Russell married Lillian "Billie" Brann (died 1995) in 1931; they had a daughter Judith Aileen. He died 15 August 2001.

== Recognition ==
In 1978 he was awarded the MBE, then later the AM.

The Australian Cartoonist's Association Silver Stanley Award is now known as the Jim Russell Award and is awarded to a cartoonist for services to the cartooning industry. Russell was their longtime secretary (then known as the Black and White Artists' Club).
