= Transformers: Generation 1 =

Toy line from 1984 to 1990

- Type: Action figure
- Invented by: Shōji Kawamori; Kazutaka Miyatake
- Company: Hasbro/Takara
- Country: United States/Japan/United Kingdom/Canada
- Availability: 1984–1992
- Slogan: "More Than Meets the Eye" "Robots in Disguise"

Transformers: Generation 1 (also known as Generation One or G1) is a toy line from 1984 to 1990, produced by Hasbro and Takara Tomy. Inaugurating the successful Transformers toy and entertainment franchise, the line of toy robots could change into an alternate form (vehicles such as cars and planes, miniature guns or cassettes, animals, and also dinosaurs) by moving parts into other places. The line was originally called The Transformers, with "Generation 1" originating as a term coined by fans of the toys when the Transformers: Generation 2 toy line was released in 1992. Hasbro eventually adopted the term "Generation 1" to refer to any toy produced in that era.

The Transformers started as a joint venture between Hasbro of the United States and Takara of Japan. After an idea to rebrand and sell Takara's Diaclone and Micro Change robot toys as a whole new line with a new concept behind it (developed by Hasbro's partners at Marvel Comics), Hasbro ultimately created what would be one of the longest-running and most popular franchises for both companies. Starting in 1984, the line ran for seven years in America and eight in Europe and Japan (though Takara would break the line up into multiple sub-franchises).

== Development ==
In 1983, Hasbro representatives were sent to the Tokyo Toy Show, a toy expo in Japan, in search of prospective toys that they could import to the North American market. At the time, Japanese toy manufacturer Takara was showcasing several transforming robot toys from lines such as Diaclone and Micro Change. Hasbro bought the rights to produce the toys, but decided to release them under a single brand to avoid confusing the market with several series with similar premises. Other toy molds from other companies such as Bandai were used as well.

Prior to the Hasbro deal, Takara briefly sold Diaclone toys in specialty toy shops in the U.S. under the "Diakron" moniker, while in some parts of Europe, Diaclone enjoyed a small following with a comic book series for that market.

Hasbro had a business relationship with Marvel Comics, which had successfully produced the Hasbro tie-in comic book G.I. Joe: A Real American Hero, based on the Hasbro action figure G.I. Joe. Marvel was approached once again to provide a backstory for the new toy line. Marvel editor-in-chief Jim Shooter created an overall story, and editor Bob Budiansky created names, short descriptions and profiles for the characters.

The designs for the original 28 figures were made by renowned anime character and mecha designers Shōji Kawamori and Kazutaka Miyatake, both from Studio Nue.

When the toy line was released, it was supported by the Marvel Comics series, an animated television series, and a gamut of other merchandising tie-ins. The 1986 feature film The Transformers: The Movie generated $5,706,456 at the United States box office.

== Premise ==
The premise behind the Transformers toy line is that an individual toy's parts can be shifted about to change it from a vehicle, a device, or an animal, to a robot action figure and back again. The franchise's taglines, "More Than Meets the Eye" and "Robots in Disguise", reflect this ability.

The plot of the original Transformers toyline, which carries over to most future interpretions of the characters, focuses on two factions of sentient alien robots: the heroic Autobots and the villainous Decepticons. (Note: These factions are known as "Cybertrons" and "Destrons" in Japan, respectively, although the English terms are better known world-wide.) These robots are able to change into another form, be it a vehicle, mechanical device or even animals.

The Autobots and Decepticons have waged civil war for eons on their home planet of Cybertron, a war that had started several million years B.C., before humans even existed on Earth. Their planet of Cybertron had become decimated and both factions have been reduced to scavenging for needed supplies, primarily energy - mainly stored in cubes of "energon". The Autobots leave their planet on a space ship, and the Decepticons follow them in their own vessel. When the Decepticons board the Autobot ship, a battle breaks out, and with nobody controlling the ship, it crashes onto prehistoric Earth and knocks the Transformers unconscious. (Note: The Transformers: Beast Wars franchise that followed Generation 1 shows a period between the Transformers' arrival on Earth and their reawakening in the original cartoon.) Millions of years later, in 1984, the dormant volcano the Autobot ship had crashed on becomes active. The eruption re-sets the ship's computer, which deploys a probe to study the planet. The computer learns that the planet is inhabited, and in order to survive first contact the computer both repairs the disabled Transformers and re-configures them with physical forms based on vehicles and machines of human origin, bringing their war to Earth. The Transformers are now able to hide by changing into vehicles or devices in case humans turn out to be hostile.

This initial premise, in all three media of toys, TV series, and comics, became more cosmic in scale. More stories began to be set in outer space and on alien worlds, especially after The Transformers: The Movie.

Additional story elements are also added to the series, such as establishing the origins of the Transformers race. The movie established a cruel and coldly logical race of alien squid-like creatures with five faces and tentacles known as Quintessons, who were later revealed as the creators of the Autobots and Decepticons in the third season of the series. They also created a gigantic factory that would become Cybertron. Eventually the design of the robots would become so sophisticated they developed emotions, self-awareness, and the machines went into rebellion, known as the first Cybertronian War. After successfully seizing control of Cybertron the robots lived in peace until the Decepticons could not resist or overcome their innate desire for military campaign and attempted a coup. The Autobots only overcame the Decepticons in the second Cybertronian war by developing transformation to hide as mundane objects, vehicles, or tools. After copying the transformation ability of Autobots and creating a new leader named Megatron, the Decepticons launched into a third Cybertronian war that would see Cybertron ruined, at which point the TV series begins.

Two characters – each the greatest leader of his side, became the most iconic representatives of the series: Optimus Prime of the Autobots and Megatron of the Decepticons. After the featured film, Megatron was reformed as Galvatron, and Optimus Prime was replaced for the majority of the third season by Rodimus Prime, only to return at the end. Both Optimus Prime and Megatron continued to appear in one form or another in subsequent Transformers series, where they maintained their leadership roles.

== History ==
The toys of Generation 1 have seven series by year.

=== Series 1 ===
The first series features twenty-eight characters in all; eighteen Autobots and ten Decepticons.

Optimus Prime is the Autobot Commander and transforms into a tractor trailer truck – specifically a Freightliner COE 1980. While in its robot form, the toy consists of three separate parts: the main figure, which transforms into the cabin of the truck; an Autobot Headquarters, which transforms into the tractor trailer, serves as a combat deck, and includes a mechanic/artillery robot; and a small scout car named Roller, which launches from the Autobot Headquarters.

The eleven Autobot cars consist of Bluestreak, Hound, Ironhide, Jazz, Mirage, Prowl, Ratchet, Sideswipe, Sunstreaker, Trailbreaker, and Wheeljack. Bluestreak, the gunner, transforms into a Datsun Fairlady 280ZX; Hound, the scout, transforms into a Mitsubishi J59 Jeep; Ironhide, who serves as security, transforms into a 1980 Nissan Onebox Cherry Vanette; Jazz, the special operations expert, transforms into a 1976 Porsche 935 Martini (#4); Mirage, the spy, transforms into a Ligier JS11 Formula 1 Racer; Prowl, the military strategist, transforms into a Datsun Fairlady 280ZX Police Cruiser; Ratchet, the medic, transforms into a Nissan Onebox Ambulance Vanette; Sideswipe, a warrior, transforms into a Lamborghini Countach prototype crafted from the LP500S model; Sunstreaker, who is Sideswipe's twin brother, and is also a warrior, transforms into a Lamborghini Countach LP500S; Trailbreaker, the defense strategist, transforms into a Toyota Hi-Lux 4WD; and Wheeljack, the mechanical engineer, transforms into a Lancia Stratos Turbo #539 "Alitalia".

Almost all of the first year Autobot cars were nearly identical in appearance to their Diaclone counterparts with the exception of Bluestreak and Ironhide. All box art as well as catalog and instructions for Bluestreak show a blue Fairlady Z with a silver hood. The toy itself was only sold in solid silver. There has been rumors of a "blue" Bluestreak being released in the US market but no boxed examples have been identified. Ironhide is a red Nissan Onebox Cherry Vannette and the Diaclone version was black.

The six Autobot minicars consist of Brawn, Bumblebee, Cliffjumper, Gears, Huffer, and Windcharger. Brawn, who serves in demolitions, transforms into a Land Rover Defender 4x4; Bumblebee transforms into a Classic Volkswagen Beetle; Cliffjumper, a warrior, transforms into a Porsche Turbo 924; Gears, who serves as a transport and in reconnaissance, transforms into a 4WD off-road truck; Huffer, the construction engineer, transforms into the cabin of a semi truck; and Windcharger, a warrior, transforms into a Pontiac Firebird Trans Am.

A yellow Familia 1500XG minicar dubbed "Bumblejumper" and later known as Bumper was released on Cliffjumper backer cards. No carded examples have been found with the minicar on a Bumblebee backer card.

Megatron is the Decepticon Leader and can transform into three different types of guns; a Walther P38 handgun, a particle beam cannon, and a telescopic laser cannon.

Soundwave is the Decepticon Communicator and transforms into a microcassette recorder modeled after a 1980s Sony Walkman. The five Decepticon microcassettes are Buzzsaw, Frenzy, Laserbeak, Ravage, and Rumble. Buzzsaw, the spy, resembles a condor while in robot form and came packaged with Soundwave. Laserbeak, who serves in interrogation, also resembles a condor while in robot form and was sold with Frenzy, who is a warrior. Ravage, the saboteur, resembles a jaguar while in robot form and was sold with Rumble, who serves in demolitions.

The three Decepticon planes are Skywarp, Starscream, and Thundercracker. All three of them transform into F-15 Eagles. Skywarp and Thundercracker are both warriors, while Starscream is the Aerospace Commander.

To save production costs in developing separate chassis for multiple toys, many of the G1 Transformers are simply re-painted or re-accessorized clones of one another. The physical actions to transform one or the other between modes was identical. For example:

- Ironhide and Ratchet are functionally identical to one another.
- Cliffjumper, Bumblebee, Hubcap and Bumper body moulds are all functionally identical to one another.
- Prowl, Bluestreak, and Smokescreen are functionally identical to one another.
- Trailbreaker and Hoist are functionally identical to one another.
- Grapple and Inferno are functionally identical to one another.
- Rumble and Frenzy are functionally identical to one another.
- Laserbeak and Buzzsaw are functionally identical to one another.
- Sideswipe and Red Alert are functionally identical to one another.
- Optimus Prime's and Ultra Magnus' cab section are functionally identical to one another.
- Pipes and Huffer are functionally identical to one another.

Finally, Thundercracker, Starscream, and Skywarp are functionally identical to one another. The Series 2 Decepticon jets (Thrust, Dirge, and Ramjet) all share the same robot centerline of the Series 1 jets with different attachable wing accessories (Thrust's have molded (non-functional) vertical turbofans in them, Dirge's are elongated like a hyper-performance flyer, and Ramjet's have ramjets).

As the series moved farther along beyond the first two series and new characters were introduced, this replication became fewer and farther between. The newer toys tended to share thematic processes (such as the Headmaster and Targetmaster lines) but the physical manipulation of the toy to transform it between modes was generally unique to that character.

=== Series 2 ===
Series 2 features reissued versions of all of the toys from Series 1 and also introduced seventy-six new toys. Although in a broad sense, forty-three of these new toys are Autobots, and thirty-one of them are Decepticons, the branding for the toy line became much more specific during this series, as various subgroups began to be introduced. As such, only thirty-five of these new toys are standard Autobots and only eighteen of them are standard Decepticons. Of the other new toys, five are branded as "Dinobots", three are branded as "Omnibots", six are branded as "Constructicons", and seven are branded as "Insecticons"; the Dinobots and the Omnibots are both subgroups of the Autobots, while the Constructicons and the Insecticons are both subgroups of the Decepticons. Each following series of Generation 1 introduced more subgroups to the toy line and continued the practice established by Series 2 of aligning those with names ending in the suffix "-bot" with the Autobots, and those with names ending in the suffix "-con" with the Decepticons. Rounding out the seventy-six new toys of the series, are the first two accessories of the toy line to be individually sold.

Can you find the black square label on your Transformer? Rub the label-Watch the robot face appear! It is your evidence that this robot is a "true" Transformer!

— Operating explanation for the heat-sensitive rub signs, as found in the instruction booklets for toys that were new to Series 2, and in brochures that were included with the reissued Series 1 toys.

Heat-sensitive stickers, dubbed "rub signs", were introduced to the original toys for Series 2: both those that were new to the series, as well as the reissued versions of Series 1 toys. These rub signs are initially black in appearance; once exposed to heat, typically by rubbing these stickers, the toy's allegience - be it Autobot or Decepticon - will appear. Intended as a means of authentication, they were introduced in response to similar, though inferior, bootleg toys that were being released at the time. Rub signs would continue to make an appearance in later Transformers toylines.

Series 2 features seven new Autobot Cars. They consist of Grapple, Hoist, Inferno, Red Alert, Skids, Smokescreen, and Tracks. Grapple, the architect, transforms into a crane; Hoist, who serves in maintenance, transforms into a Toyota Hi-Lux 4WD tow truck model; Inferno, who serves in search and rescue, transforms into a fire engine; Red Alert, the security director, transforms into a fire chief's Lamborghini Countach; Skids, the theoretician, transforms into a Honda City Turbo; Smokescreen, the diversionary tactician, transforms into a 1979 custom Datsun 280ZX; and Tracks, a warrior, transforms into a 1980 Chevrolet Corvette.

Series 2 features five new Autobot minicars. They consist of Beachcomber, Cosmos, Powerglide, Seaspray, and Warpath. Beachcomber, the geologist, transforms into a dune buggy; Cosmos, who serves in reconnaissance and communications, transforms into a flying saucer; Powerglide, a warrior, transforms into an A-10 Thunderbolt II airplane; Seaspray, who serves in naval defense, transforms into a hovercraft; and Warpath, a warrior, transforms into a tank.

Series 2 features two Autobot Jumpstarters; Topspin and Twin Twist. Both of them transform into spaceships. Topspin serves in land and sea assault, and Twin Twist serves in demolitions.

Series 2 features two Autobot Deluxe Vehicles; Roadbuster and Whirl. Roadbuster, the Ground Assault Commander, transforms into a 4-WD vehicle, and Whirl, who serves in aerial assault, transforms into an AH-1 Cobra Helicopter.

=== 1984 and 1985 ===
The 1984-85 lines became the foundation of the Generation 1 series, with all of the classic characters introduced here. The two years were actually one single run, story-wise and thematically. This is most evident in the first and second seasons of the animated series.

The toys made use of molds and designs primarily from the Micro Change and Diaclone lines. The 1985 toyline introduced the idea of special subgroup teams like the Dinobots, Constructicons and Insecticons. Toward the end of the animated series’ second season, several characters from the 1986 line were introduced, particularly the Combiner teams.

Other characters were taken from different toy lines of other companies. A particularly infamous example was Jetfire; due to the VF-1 Valkyrie mold from which his alternate mode was based on originating from Macross, no accurate toy was released of him until 2023.

=== 1986 ===
The year of 1986 saw Hasbro start using original designs for many characters as fewer Microman and Diaclone molds were recycled. This was a banner year for the toy line as the tie-in animated feature, The Transformers: The Movie, was finally released. While the movie was not the blockbuster Hasbro hoped for, it marked a change in the direction the series in general was taking.

The last use of a non-Takara toy for the Hasbro line was also in 1986: Sky Lynx, originally manufactured by ToyBox.

New characters Rodimus Prime and Galvatron replaced Optimus Prime and Megatron in their respective roles. Subgroup teams became prevalent. The number of new characters increased from this year on. The TV series followed the movie and was now set in the future while the comics’ storyline continued to be set in the present time.

Optimus Prime and Megatron were both offered as a Movie Mail Away. Both figures were identical to their original release with the exception of a more reinforced fist design for Optimus Prime. Both figures came in their standard styrofoam insert but the box was a plain brown mailer box. Each figure was accompanied with a "Movie Edition" certificate and sticker.

=== 1987 ===
As Transformers went on, new characters needed new gimmicks to stand out. As the number of Combiner teams had been reduced, the Headmasters and Targetmasters were introduced. Fortress Maximus and Scorponok became leaders of the Autobot and Decepticon forces respectively.

One of the more unusual toys introduced in the year was Sixshot, a Decepticon billed as a "Solo Transformer Assault Group" ("S.T.A.G."), having as many as six modes. This number of modes was unprecedented at the time - Sixshot's instruction leaflet was even sealed shut with a sticker, challenging buyers to figure out all six modes without aid. Twenty limited edition all black versions of the Sixshot toy were produced.

The animated series had one more season, but only three episodes were produced in America due to Sunbow losing its contract and its subsequent inability to renew (coinciding with the G.I. Joe cartoon's demise). Thus, only the comics supported the toy line.

=== 1988 ===
Transformers continued on, despite less support and still managed to introduce a plethora of new characters. New Headmaster and Targetmaster characters were introduced, but the new driving forces for the line were the Pretenders and Powermasters (which featured the return of Optimus Prime).

=== 1989 ===
The toy line received a new logo design for its sixth year. The subgrouping idea was changed as characters were now limited to Pretender and Micromaster groups. These two groups were further subdivided into thematic teams. A few classic characters were revamped as Pretenders.

=== 1990 ===
In its final year in the US market, Transformers' last burst was with a more expanded Micromaster line and the introduction of the Action Masters – non-transforming figures of classic characters with transformable vehicles and weapons.

=== International market ===
Of the countries Transformers was exported to, Japan and the UK were the only ones to innovate upon the toy line in the interim between 1990 and 1993, before the launch of the next series, Transformers: Generation 2.

The UK releases, while in general following the American releases and storylines, omitted a fairly large selection of the original toys from the US line. The UK line first started branching away from the US line in 1990 with the re-releases of several early toys under the "Classics" banner. However, it was 1991 when the UK line went in its own unique direction. Though there were only a few characters introduced, they were toys that none of the US audience had ever seen. The 1991 and 1992 toys also found their way to Asian and Australian stores. The 1991 line did away with the Micromasters but had additional Action Master characters, in addition to re-uses of some of Takara's previously Japanese-exclusive molds.

1992 saw the release of the Autobot Turbomasters, the Decepticon Predators, yellow unnamed versions of the Constructicons (minus the parts to make Devastator), and re-colored versions of four sixths of the Japanese-exclusive Breastforce, simply known collectively as the Rescue Force. In early 1993, more exclusive figures were released under the Transformers (no subtitle) label, most notably the color-changing Stormtroopers, the Lightformers, the Trakkons, and the Autobot and Decepticon Obliterators. The heads of the Obliterators, Pyro and Clench, were the inspiration for the redesigned Autobot and Decepticon symbols that were used on this year's packaging and later used for Transformers: Generation 2.

The Japanese toy company Takara, from which Transformers had originated, had the rights to distribute the toys in Japan. Unlike Hasbro UK, Takara had more autonomy for releases and storyline that were running concurrent with the American line. For example, several characters appeared that were only exclusive to the Japanese market and Toei Animation continued the animated series with their own storylines.

In 1989, Takara departed from the lineup of characters that Hasbro released that year, choosing instead to use a different set of characters. In 1990, the Micromaster concept was embraced wholeheartedly as the majority of the toys that year and the next were of that nature. 1991 would see more Micromasters released, including the first Micromaster combiner, alongside three larger Battlestars. One of which was Star Convoy, a reborn version of Optimus Prime. Uniquely, the 1991 range in Japan consisted of only Autobot characters. The 1992 range in Japan was the final year of Generation 1, and featured several more Micromaster combiners, recolored versions of Defensor and Bruticus, and the smaller Turbomasters and Predators which were concurrently released in Europe.

== Animated series ==
The animated series was produced by Sunbow Productions, Marvel Productions, and Toei Animation (occasionally by AKOM).

In March 2009, Shout! Factory announced that they had acquired license from Hasbro to re-release Transformers on DVD in Region 1. The Complete First Season: 25th Anniversary edition was released on June 16, 2009. The set includes 16 episodes, in addition to bonus footage, including: The history of Hasbro and the origins of Transformers. Season 2, Volume 1 was released on September 15, 2009. Season 2, Volume 2 was released on January 12, 2010.

In addition, On October 20, 2009, Shout! Factory released the complete series in a single box set for the first time in Region 1. This set, dubbed "Transformers- The Complete Series: The Matrix of Leadership Collector's Set" features all 98 remastered episodes along with all new bonus features on 16 DVDs.

== Comics ==
Three publishers had or have the license to produce comic books based on the Transformers. Marvel Comics held the license during the original run of the toy line. Marvel's UK branch also published their own Transformers stories. Dreamwave Productions revived Transformers comics in 2002 but went bankrupt in 2005, forcing a cessation. IDW Publishing picked up the rights soon after, beginning a long-running comic book universe that eventually saw crossovers with other Hasbro intellectual properties. IDW's license lapsed in 2022, with Skybound Entertainment and Image Comics beginning a brand-new series the following year. Much like IDW's 2005 series, Skybound's series ties into a new shared universe with several other Hasbro intellectual properties.

Each publisher who picked up the comics rights all chose to go with their own continuity than continue the hanging storylines, if any were left, from the previous publisher. As the comics regularly features characters dying, thus far, this is the only way to get around regarding use of characters and issues regarding their place in continuity. Additionally, the British Marvel series published the American stories, but as the series ran weekly, additional stories had to be made to act as a supplement. These UK-only stories often worked in and around the US stories, offering a different experience. However, both series ended consecutively.

So far, there are five comic book continuities based on the Generation 1 characters:

No.	Title	Issues	Publication date	
No.	Title	Issues	First published	Last published
Marvel Comics continuity
1	The Transformers	80	September, 1984	July, 1991
2	The Transformers UK	332	September, 1984	July, 1991
3	The Transformers: The Movie	3	August, 1986	October, 1986
4	G.I. Joe and the Transformers	4	January, 1987	April, 1987
5	The Transformers: Headmasters	4	July, 1987	January, 1988
6	Transformers: Generation 2	12	November, 1993	October, 1994
7	Transformers: Generation 2 UK	5	September, 1994	February, 1995
8	Transformers: Regeneration One	20	July, 2012	March, 2014
9	Transformers '84: Secrets & Lies	4	August, 2019	October, 2020
Dreamwave comics continuity
10	Transformers: Generation One	26	April, 2002	December, 2004
11	Transformers: The War Within	15	October, 2002	December, 2004
12	Transformers: Micromasters	4	June, 2004	September, 2004
IDW 2005 comics continuity
13	IDW 2005 comics continuity	427	October, 2005	November, 2018
IDW 2019 comics continuity
14	Transformers	43	March, 2019	June, 2022
15	Transformers: Galaxies	12	September, 2019	December, 2020
16	Transformers: Escape	5	December, 2020	July, 2021
17	Wreckers: Tread & Circuits	4	October, 2021	January, 2022
18	Transformers: War's End	4	February, 2022	May, 2022
Energon Universe (Skybound Entertainment)
19	Transformers	37	October, 2023	Currently ongoing
Total		1041	September, 1984	present

== Reception ==
In 1986, film critic Richard Martin called the first generation toy series a more fun counterpart to Rubik's Cube in "[helping] children develop their hand-eye coordination and their spatial reasoning skills, but Hasbro kept quiet about this, believing no self-respecting 10-year-old boy would bug his parents half to death to buy him an educational toy". He said "[kids mastered] its difficulties in no time [but it makes] grown-ups feel like klutzes". He said the resulting TV show "has topped the ratings every week since its debut in 1985, thus setting the stage for The Transformers: The Movie (1986) [which is] designed to sell more toys to more kids. [...] Transformers don't really die, they just become new products." In carrying this thought process, The Transformers: The Movie was written to introduce the 1986 batch of toys as effective replacements for the existing toyline; in doing so, Hasbro mandated the removal of Optimus Prime from the roster of characters, despite pushback from screenwriter Ron Friedman. The company underestimated the impact that Optimus' death would have on the young audience, leading to an outcry from fans, a letter-writing campaign, and Optimus' subsequent revival in the TV series.

== Legacy ==
Ralston produced breakfast cereals based on 1980s cartoons, including Transformers Chocolate Flavored Cereal, similar to Cocoa Puffs.

The official international Transformers convention is BotCon, but other fan events include Auto Assembly and TransForce in the UK and past Transformers-only events have included BotCon Japan, BotCon Europe and "The Official Transformers Collectors' Convention" (OTFCC). The first large Transformers convention in the Nordic countries was called "The NTFA Mini-Con", with official support from Hasbro Nordic, and was held by members of The Nordic TransFans Association (NTFA) for the first time on November 3–4, 2007. The second NTFA convention with official support from Hasbro Nordic was renamed "NordCon" (to avoid copyright problems with the name "Mini-Con") and held in Aalborg, Denmark, from June 19–20, 2010. It featured Simon Furman as a guest of honour. In 2011, NordCon and Auto Assembly joined forces to create a new convention called Auto Assembly Europe, which first took place in Uppsala, Sweden, in November 2011.

A Transformers Hall of Fame was created in 2010. The Botcon 2010 inauguration included Bob Budiansky, Peter Cullen, Hideaki Yoke, Ōno Kōjin, and the characters Optimus Prime, Bumblebee, Megatron, Starscream and the Dinobots.

In November 2024, Transformers action figures were inducted into the National Toy Hall of Fame at The Strong National Museum of Play.

=== Third party ===
Many companies have taken to creating their own higher-quality engineered toys based on the Generation 1 designs. Companies like FansToys and X-Transbots focus on Masterpiece scale figures with high accuracy to the original cartoon, where companies like Newage focus on Legends class figures, ideal for dioramas. Many of these third-party figures have unique names for characters, and often lack emblems in an effort to avoid legal action from Hasbro and Takara. Many fans enjoy the availability of these figures as they either fill in a character that has not been given an official masterpiece figure by Takara, or provides a better engineered or priced version of a character. The Legends class figures are popular as they typically scale well for larger battles while not requiring as much space, and they typically scale well with Titan class figures like Omega Supreme and Combiners like Devastator, better than typical toys. There are also companies that offer "fourth-party" figures, sometimes called KOs or knock-offs, cheaper versions of both official Takara toys and third-party toys typically using cheaper plastics or differing colors.
