= Kate Leth =

Canadian comic book creator (born 1988)

- Born: Katrina Jade Leth; September 29, 1988 (age 38) Ottawa, Ontario, Canada
- Area: Writer
- Notable works: Adventure Time: Seeing Red; Bravest Warriors; Patsy Walker, A.K.A. Hellcat!

Katrina Jade "Kate" Leth (born 1988) is a Canadian comic book creator, known for works such as Patsy Walker, A.K.A. Hellcat!.

== Career ==
Leth was born in Ottawa and lives in Halifax, Nova Scotia, and attended NSCAD University, studying photography. They dropped out before achieving their degree.

=== Comics ===
Leth worked at the Strange Adventures comic shop in Halifax, where they developed an interest in comics, and created promotional art for the shop. In 2010, they created their webcomic Kate or Die for their blog. Kate or Die eventually became a bi-weekly column on Comics Alliance. They cited fellow Nova Scotia writer Kate Beaton as an influence, "...this person who was putting all this stuff out there, and no real formal art school training, but was doing really well with her work." Leth also contributed to the webcomics Locke & Key: Guide to the Known Keys and The Strange Talent of Luther Strode, and the anthology, Womanthologoy: Heroic. They later contributed to the Smut Peddler anthology in 2012.

Leth's Adventure Time fan art on their Tumblr page attracted the attention of BOOM! Studios, publishers of the comic based on the television show. They were hired to do covers, a short story, and a graphic novel, Adventure Time: Seeing Red, which entered The New York Times Best Seller list in April 2014. They also were a co-writer and co-artist for issue 3 of Adventure Time with Fionna and Cake, Adventure Time: Bitter Sweets, and Adventure Time: The Four Castles.

In 2013, Leth organized The Valkyries, a group of women who work in comics retail. In 2017, Leth described the group as "great for creating a community" and equivalent to a union. The group was disbanded in 2018, largely related to accusations that the group failed to adequately represent the concerns of women of color.

In 2014, Leth wrote for Jim Henson's Fraggle Rock: Journey to the Everspring, and Edward Scissorhands In 2015, Leth worked with Joe Quinones to pitch Batman ’89 as a comic series, but DC Comics rejected it.

In 2015, Leth wrote another comic for Boom!, Power Up, and wrote six issues of Vampirella for Dynamite Entertainment. Leth was co-host for Less Than Live with Kate or Die, a bi-weekly comics podcast which last aired in 2016. Leth collaborated with the podcast Welcome to Night Vale and wrote stories for the Lumberjanes comic for Boom!. In 2018, Lumberjanes, the comic to which Leth contributed along with 5 other creators, was nominated for a GLAAD Media Award. They also worked on Transformers: Galaxies, an anthology comic book series by IDW Publishing which is a spin-off to 2019's Transformers comic book, which began on September 25, 2019 and concluded on December 30, 2020.

For Marvel they contributed to Secret Wars, Too, a comedic anthology, and Patsy Walker, A.K.A. Hellcat!, for 17 issues. In 2016, Leth wrote for the graphic novel, School Spirit. From October 2016 to February 2017, they contributed to issues 1-5 of Spell on Wheels, co-writing with Megan Levens.

Leth was also the cover artist for various webcomics. This included Adventure Time: Marceline and the Scream Queens #5 in 2012, The Midas Flesh #3 in 2013, Littlest Pet Shop #2 and Lumberjanes #1 in 2014, and Swords of Sorrow. Additionally, they were a variant cover artist of Sex Criminals #12.

In 2020, Leth announced they had signed a deal with Simon and Schuster to produce a graphic novel entitled Mall Goth, released in September 2023.

=== Animation ===
Leth wrote for the 2018 Bravest Warriors episode "Chained to Your Side". The same year, the three episodes of Polly Pocket, two episodes of Craig of the Creek, the Littlest Pet Shop: A World of Our Own episode "The Purr-fect Storm", the My Little Pony: Friendship is Magic episode "Mystery Voice" and 17 episodes of Transformers: Cyberverse they had written were released. Additionally, from 2018 to 2019, the five episodes of My Little Pony: Equestria Girls were released. They had previously contributed to Bravest Warriors comics in 2012 and two graphic novels of Mysticons in 2018 and 2019.

In 2021, the series High Guardian Spice was released on Crunchyroll. Leth co-wrote four episodes for the seasons, and two other episodes individually. Leth also appeared in the 2014 documentary She Makes Comics and in the 2016 episode "Paper Plate Pictionary" of Super Fun Awesome Party Game Time. From 2016 to 2017, they voiced Sira the Unbidden in the series Vast.

== Personal life ==
Leth lived in Burbank, California from January 2016 until September 2020, when they moved back to Halifax, Nova Scotia. While in college, Leth and their colleague Vincenzo Ravina created a website dedicated to their hatred of the Crocs shoes. They are openly bisexual and non-binary, using they/them pronouns and undergoing top surgery in April 2022. They have also described themself as queer and genderfluid.

In September 2019, Leth announced their engagement to longtime partner Cohen Edenfield, but revealed in July 2022 that the couple had "parted ways" and "remain best friends".

== Bibliography ==
- The Strange Talent of Luther Strode (2011)
- Locke & Key: Guide to the Known Keys (2011)
- Womanthologoy: Heroic (2011)
- Bravest Warriors (2012) – writer for issues #21-36 art by Ian McGinty
- Smut Peddler (2012)
- Adventure Time with Fionna and Cake (2013) – co-writer and co-artist for issue #3
- Adventure Time: Seeing Red (2014) – writer
- Adventure Time: Bitter Sweets (2014)– writer
- Adventure Time: The Four Castles (2016) – writer
- Jim Henson's Fraggle Rock: Journey to the Everspring (2014)
- Edward Scissorhands (2014) – writer
- Power Up (2015)
- School Spirit (2016)
- Mall Goth (2023)

=== Dark Horse Comics ===
- Spell on Wheels #1–5 (with Megan Levens, October 2016–February 2017)
- Mysticons: Volume 1 (September 21, 2018)
- Mysticons: Volume 2 (March 2019)

=== Marvel Comics ===
- Secret Wars Too (story "Pizza Quest", with Brittney Williams; November 2015)
- Amazing Spider-Man: Renew Your Vows #1 (story "Make It Work", with Marguerite Sauvage; November 2016)
- Patsy Walker, A.K.A. Hellcat! #1–17 (with Brittney Williams, December 2015–April 2017)

=== Dynamite Comics ===
- Vampirella #1–6 (with Eman Casallos, March 2016–August 2016)

=== The Teenager Corporation ===
- Mr Boop Vol II (August 2020)
  - Guest Strip: Commitment

=== Covers ===
- Adventure Time: Marceline and the Scream Queens #5 (cover artist) (2012)
- The Midas Flesh #3 (cover artist) (2013)
- Littlest Pet Shop #2 (cover artist) (2014)
- Lumberjanes #1 (cover artist) (2014)
- Sex Criminals #12 (variant cover artist)
- Swords of Sorrow (cover artist) (2015)

== Filmography ==
=== Film ===
Title	Year	Notes
She Makes Comics	2014	Original art in this documentary
Super Fun Awesome Party Game Time	2016	Appeared in the episode "Paper Plate Pictionary"

=== Television ===
Title	Year	Notes		
Title	Year	Vast	2016–2017	Voice of Sira the Unbidden
Bravest Warriors	2018	Writer for the episode "Chained to Your Side"		
Polly Pocket	2018	Writer of three episodes (Note: Specifically "Area Fifty None", "Halloween Queen" and "Princess Predicament")		
Craig of the Creek	2018	Story writer for two episodes (Note: The episodes are "The Invitation" and "The Curse")		
Littlest Pet Shop: A World of Our Own	2018	Writer of the episode "The Purr-fect Storm"		
My Little Pony: Friendship is Magic	2018	Writer for the episode "Mystery Voice"		
Transformers: Cyberverse	2018	Staff writer on 17 episodes		
My Little Pony: Equestria Girls	2018–2019	Writer for five episodes (Note: "Costume Conundrum", "Wake-Up!", "The Last Day of School", "Blue Crushed", and "Lost and Found")		
High Guardian Spice	2021	Co-wrote four episodes (Note: Specifically "Journey to Lyngarth", "Disorientation Day", "Crushing Obstacles", and "Festival of Fall" (Part 1)) and wrote two episodes individually (Note: These episodes are "Transformations", and "Past Present")		
