= Transformers: War's End =

American comic book limited series

- Cover A for issue #1 by Angel Hernandez and Fran Gamboa.

Publication information
- Publisher: IDW Publishing (licensed by Hasbro)
- Format: Limited series
- Publication date: February 23 – May 25, 2022
- No. of issues: 4
- Main character(s): 2019 IDW Transformers universe

Creative team
- Written by: Brian Ruckley
- Penciller(s): Jack Lawrence; Ed Pierre
- Inker(s): Matt Froese; Maria Kaene; Rik Mack
- Letterer(s): Nathan Widick; Jake M. Wood
- Colorist(s): John-Paul Bove; Ben Pierre; Ed Pierre; Priscilla Tramontano
- Editor(s): David Mariotte; Riley Farmer; Tom Waltz

Transformers: War's End is an American comic book limited series published by IDW Publishing. Based upon the Transformers franchise by Hasbro and Takara-Tomy, the series is set in the same continuity as the 2019 mainline comic book, set parallelly during the events of issues #40–43.

The series debuted on February 23, 2022 and concluded on May 25, 2022.

== Premise ==
A long time ago, Exarchon, a once peaceful and respected Transformer, somehow became a warlord and started his war against Cybertron through his faction, the Threefold Spark. Sometime later, during the conflict between the Autobots and the Decepticons, Exarchon reunites with his former generals, Skywarp and Shockwave, to finish what they started.

== Publication history ==
=== Background ===
Transformers was first announced by IDW Publishing on December 18, 2018. The title is written by Brian Ruckley, and was initially illustrated by Angel Hernandez and Cachét Whitman, and started publishing issues twice-monthly in March 2019. Ruckley described the writing opportunity as a "privilege", and stated that the title would be a great opportunity for new readers to familiarize themselves with the universe and characters of the Transformers franchise, which he describes as of the "biggest [and] best that science fiction has to offer".

=== Development ===
In November 2021, IDW Publishing announced Transformers: War's End, a limited series written by Brian Ruckley (writer of Transformers and Transformers: Escape) and drawn by Jack Lawrence (artist of Transformers: Lost Light and Wreckers: Tread & Circuits), and was set to be released in February 2022.

Ruckley said "War's End is about unfinished business: for both the characters and for Cybertron as a whole. It's the return of Cybertron's traumatic past to upend its present... and answers the question: If your planet has at its core the collective Spark of your entire civilization, just how vulnerable might that make you?"

Lawrence said "Up to now, my Transformers work has been post- or pre-war, so with War's End, I'm excited to contribute to the Cybertronian war itself. This story is, understandably, darker and grittier than what I've worked on before, so I'm looking forward to going shadowy and ominous with it."

David Mariotte (editor in IDW and writer of Wreckers: Tread & Circuits) said “Since launching in 2019, all our Transformers universe titles — the ongoing, Galaxies, Escape, Wreckers: Tread & Circuits, the 2021 Annual, the Valentine’s Special, and the Halloween Special — have been the quilted pieces of an epic story, helmed by Brian Ruckley. War’s End and the ongoing series are where those threads weave together, showing the full picture of the Transformers mythos — past, present, and future — that we’ve been building for years.”

== Issues ==
Issue	Title	Written by	Drawn by	Colored by	Publication date
#1	"War's End: Part One"	Brian Ruckley	Jack Lawrence; Inked by: Matt Froese	John-Paul Bove and Priscilla Tramontano	February 23, 2022
While most of the Autobots remain in Crystal City to fight the Decepticons, (Note: As depicted in Transformers #40.) another group of Autobots (Landmine, Geomotus, Zetar, Sureshot and Pointblank) walks to the Sonic Canyons in search of clues linked to Exarchon. Outside Decepticon Headquarters in Iacon, Cyclonus tries to reason with Megatron about Exarchon's return, but Megatron remains skeptical. Starscream insists Megatron about this news as an opportunity to make a positive public image for the Decepticons, but Sixshot does believe Cyclonus, pointing out what happened to Ruckus, Flatline and Deathsaurus. Exarchon/Ruckus reunites with his previous generals, Shockwave and Skywarp, (Note: As depicted in Transformers #39.) revealing more secrets about the vision he received from his mysterious benefactors. He then reunites his own group of Decepticons (Soundblaster, Onslaught, and the Combaticons) to infiltrate the Sonic Canyons, but only Skywarp deserts. Back in the Sonic Canyons, the Autobots find the mysterious facility, only to confront a lot of hidden traps alongside the presence of Exarchon/Deathsaurus.
#2	"War's End: Part Two"	Brian Ruckley	Jack Lawrence	John-Paul Bove	March 30, 2022
After deserting, Skywarp warns the Decepticons about Exarchon and Shockwave's activities, which convinces Megatron to reconsider about a temporary truce with the Autobots. While Pyra Magna goes to the Sonic Canyons with her Companions, she orders Jumpstream to step aside in order to avoid her future death. (Note: As depicted in Transformers #31–32.) Zetar's team escapes from Exarchon/Deathsaurus, only to find a secret base that builds Skywarp clones, as well as an imploder, which Exarchon has been planning to use in order to possess the AllSpark. Exarchon/Deathsaurus and his forces fight against Cyclonus, the Companions and most of Team Stream. While reconsidering the future she saw, Jumpstream gets alarmed when she sees Devastator returning to Cybertron. (Note: As depicted in Transformers #33.)
#3	"War's End: Part Three"	Brian Ruckley	Jack Lawrence	John-Paul Bove (with Ed Pierre)	April 27, 2022
Against the vision she saw, Jumpstream goes to the Sonic Canyons to warn to Pyra about Devastator’s return. While searching for a third body, Exarchon/Ruckus reveals Shockwave more about his benefactors, and why he wants to take over Cybertron in their behalf. When he reunites with Megatron, the latter shoots him, causing him to be killed by a radioactive Sunstorm. In response, Exarchon/Deathsaurus plans a meeting in order to possess Devastator.
#4	"War's End: Part Four"	Brian Ruckley	Jack Lawrence	John-Paul Bove (with Ben Pierre and Ed Pierre)	May 25, 2022
Devastator proves to be inmmune to Exarchon/Deathsaurus' possession, but it causes the Constructions to be separate again. As Team Stream retreats, Flamewar is about to be possessed by Exarchon/Deathsaurus, but Soundblaster warns him about retreating before more enemies arrive. Outside the Sonic Canyons, Mindwipe presents Pyra and Sixshot a modified Titanspark chamber in order to trap Exarchon's spark, and Cyclonus offers himself to use it. Inside his bunker, Exarchon/Deathsaurus possesses his giant drill machine, causing to dig to the Allspark's location. With Landmine and Geomutus' help, Pointblank's team manage to find the drill, but Soundblaster and Frenzy are after them too. Cyclonus uses the Titanspark to seal Exarchon/Deathsaurus' spark before Pyra destroys it before Megatron can take it. Zetar manages to destroy Exarchon's drill before it gets to the Allspark, killing Exarchon for good, but it causes a debris that leaves Frenzy trapped. Landmine decides to leave him there, as he remembers Frenzy murdered Brainstorm, which caused all of the recent events on Cybertron. (Note: As depicted in Transformers #1.) With Exarchon dead, Sixshot takes the Constructicons to Megatron, but Cyclonus decides not to be involved in the current war. When Pointblank's team returns to Exarchon's bunker, Skywarp returns to take an imploder. (Note: To be continued in Transformers: Fate of Cybertron.)

== Reception ==
Issue	Publication date	Critic rating	Critic reviews	Ref.
#1	February 23, 2022	7.2/10	3	
#2	March 30, 2022	6.0/10	1	
#3	April 27, 2022	4.0/10	1	
#4	May 25, 2022	4.0/10	1	
Overall		5.3/10	6	

== Collected edition ==
Title	Volume	Material collected	Pages	Publication date	ISBN
Transformers, Volume Six: War's End	6	Transformers #37–43; Transformers: War's End #1–4; Transformers: Fate of Cybertron	304	November 1, 2022	1684059410, 978-1684059416
