= Wreckers: Tread & Circuits =

American limited comic book series

- Cover A for issue #1.

Publication information
- Publisher: IDW Publishing (licensed by Hasbro)
- Genre: Action; Science fiction
- Publication date: October 13, 2021 – January 12, 2022
- No. of issues: 4
- Main character: 2019 IDW Transformers universe

Creative team
- Written by: David Mariotte
- Penciller: Jack Lawrence
- Letterers: Val Lopez; Nathan Widick; Jake M. Wood
- Colorists: Heather Breckel; Candice Han; Rebecca Nalty; Brittany Peer
- Editors: Riley Farmer; Tom Waltz

Wreckers: Tread & Circuits is an American limited comic book series written by David Mariotte, drawn by Jack Lawrence, colored by Candice Han and Brittany Peer, and published by IDW Publishing. Based on the Transformers franchise by Hasbro and Takara-Tomy, the series is set in the same continuity of the 2019 mainline comic book.

The series debuted on October 13, 2021, and concluded on January 12, 2022.

== Premise ==
The Wreckers are a secret operation team that infiltrates in Speedia 500, a space racing tournament in planet Velocitron, in order to stop a terrorist organization called Mayhem, without exposing their cover as extreme acrobats.

== Publication history ==
=== Background ===
Transformers was first announced by IDW Publishing on December 18, 2018. The title is written by Brian Ruckley, and was initially illustrated by Angel Hernandez and Cachét Whitman, and started publishing issues twice-monthly in March 2019. Ruckley described the writing opportunity as a "privilege", and stated that the title would be a great opportunity for new readers to familiarize themselves with the universe and characters of the Transformers franchise, which he describes as of the "biggest [and] best that science fiction has to offer".

=== Development ===
In July 2021, IDW Publishing announced the comic book limited series Wreckers: Tread & Circuits, written by IDW editor David Mariotte, drawn by Transformers: Lost Light artist Jack Lawrence and colored by Candice Han.

Mariotte said, "the Wreckers are an idea that comes from the comics—a team of Autobots willing to do what other Autobots wouldn't, and look cool as heck while doing it. Every iteration has been a bit different, and with Jack and Candice on art, this one's going to be a gorgeous new take on who the Wreckers are and how they do what they do best."

Lawrence said, "I was collecting the UK Transformers comic when the first Wreckers story was published in 1986, and it's so awesome to actually contribute to their legend. The Wreckers have always felt like a pulp adventure team, and I'm excited to bring some of that feeling to these pages."

The series concluded on January 12, 2022 after four issues.

== Issues ==
Issue	Title	Written by	Drawn by	Colored by	Publication date
#1	"Tread & Circuits: Part One"	David Mariotte	Jack Lawrence	Candice Han	October 13, 2021
The Wreckers (Thunderclash, Hot Shot, Ricochet, Aileron, Circuit, and Minerva) are an undercover team sent from Cybertron to Velocitron to watch over the Speedia 500 tournament, while livestreaming videos of their acrobatics to the public eye. On the day of the tournament, the Stuntmaster's broadcast signal gets high jacked by an organization called Mayhem, whose leader, Octopunch, murders Electrons, a former competitor who was going to participate again. Mayhem demands to cancel the tournament to take back Velocitron. The Wreckers decide to join the competition to fight against Mayhem, but Aileron has her doubts. Circuit walks on his own, feeling useless for his team, until he is found by Axer, an old acquaintance of his.
#2	"Tread & Circuits: Part Two"	David Mariotte	Jack Lawrence	Brittany Peer	November 10, 2021
While everyone bet who will win the race, the Wreckers try to investigate the Mayhem incidents. Axer, who works on Security Operations, warns Circuit about staying away from Velocitron, but the latter is shot after contacting his team while chasing Octopunch. Back in the Stuntmaster, Circuit is getting treated inside a cryogenic restoration chamber. Before the race begins, Breakdown announces security protocols to be established around the track.
#3	"Tread & Circuits: Part Three"	David Mariotte	Jack Lawrence	Rebecca Nalty and Brittany Peer	December 8, 2021
During the race, members of Mayhem set traps around the track and kill several racers. When Axer attempts to kill Knock Out, he is killed by Breakdown. Knock Out wins the race as a result, but the Wreckers failed on their mission to stop Mayhem for good.
#4	"Tread & Circuits: Part Four"	David Mariotte	Jack Lawrence	Heather Breckel	January 12, 2022
When Knock Out is about to give his speech as Senator, he is gunned down by Submarauder with a harpoon launcher. Members of Mayhem then begin an assault against the Wreckers, ending with Minerva being falsely accused of the attempted assassination. Aboard the Stuntmaster, Circuit dies because of his injuries from the Speedia 500 incident, while Thunderclash declares to recruit new members while returning to Cybertron. Back on Velocitron, Minerva discovers that Knock Out, Breakdown and Mayhem has been working with the Decepticons the whole time, before Skyquake sentences her to indefinite stasis.

== Reception ==
Issue	Publication date	Critic rating	Critic reviews	Ref.
#1	October 13, 2021	8.5/10	1	
#2	November 10, 2021	8.1/10	1	
#3	December 8, 2021	7.9/10	1	
#4	January 12, 2022	—N/a	—N/a	
Overall		8.2/10	3	

== Collected edition ==
Title	Volume	Material collected	Pages	Publication date	ISBN
Transformers, Volume Five: Horrors Near and Far	5	Transformers #31–36; Transformers Annual 2021; Transformers Halloween Special; Wreckers: Tread & Circuits #1–4	304	June 8, 2022	978-1684058839
