= My Little Pony/Transformers =

2020 crossover comic book series

- Cover art for Friendship in Disguise! issue #1.

Publication information
- Publisher: IDW Publishing
- Schedule: Monthly
- Format: Limited series
- Genre: Science fantasy
- Publication date: Series 1: August 5, 2020 — November 4, 2020; Series 2: April 28, 2021 — July 21, 2021
- No. of issues: Series 1: 4 Series 2: 4

Creative team
- Written by: James Asmus; Ian Flynn; Sam Maggs
- Artist(s): Casey W. Coller; Jack Lawrence; Sara Pitre-Durocher (series 1); Priscilla Tramontano; Tony Fleecs
- Editor: Megan Brown

My Little Pony/Transformers is the name of two American limited comic book miniseries by IDW Publishing, representing a crossover event between Hasbro brands My Little Pony and Transformers.

The first series titled My Little Pony/Transformers: Friendship in Disguise! was released on August 5, 2020, after being delayed from its original release date of May 2020 due to the COVID-19 pandemic, and concluded on November 4, 2020.

The second series titled My Little Pony/Transformers: The Magic of Cybertron was released on April 28, 2021 and concluded on July 21, 2021.

== Premise ==
In the first miniseries, when Queen Chrysalis casts a spell looking for more changelings, she accidentally interferes with a malfunctioning Cybertronian Spacebridge, transporting both the Autobots and Decepticons into Equestria.

In the second miniseries, while using a modified Spacebridge to bring magic to Cybertron, the Decepticons end up unleashing a more powerful evil from Equestria than they ever could have imagined, which leads the ponies to travel to Cybertron and team up with the Autobots and Decepticons.

== Publication history ==
In 2020, IDW Publishing announced My Little Pony/Transformers: Friendship in Disguise!, the first crossover miniseries between Hasbro brands My Little Pony and Transformers, being written by James Asmus, Ian Flynn, and Sam Maggs, with art by Casey W. Coller, Jack Lawrence, Sara Pitre-Durocher, Priscilla Tramontano, and Tony Fleecs.

Asmus says "The writing I've gotten to do individually for My Little Pony and Transformers have already proven to be some of the most fun I've had in my career, so it's pure joy to play them off each other. We're making a wild mash-up unlike anything else in your comic collection. You basically owe it to yourself and your future happiness to get a copy!"

Flynn says "It's been a delightful challenge finding common threads between the ponies and bots. It's certainly a fun and unique opportunity. I hope fans of both franchises can come together and enjoy this." Maggs says "My Little Pony and Transformers are two of my all-time favorite universes. Having written for them both previously, the idea of bringing the citizens of Equestria and Cybertron together is incredibly exciting."

IDW Editor-In-Chief John Barber says "teaming Transformers and My Little Pony has been a dream we've had for a long time. We're all really excited to see this mashup of characters by a mashup of creators who are honoring the legacy of both universes… and doing it in the most bonkers, fun way imaginable!"

In 2021, IDW announced a sequel series titled My Little Pony/Transformers: The Magic of Cybertron, featuring of most of the creative team from the previous series.

Maggs said "I can't wait to jump back into this world of magical friendships that really is More than Meets the Eye. It's such a blast coming up with the most fun (and downright weird) pairings of ponies and 'bots, and I think fans of both series are going to be surprised at what's we've got for them this second time around!"

Asmus added that "The first crossover was about as much fun as I've had in my writing career. I am hugely delighted that we're not only doing a follow-up, but getting to flip the script. In the first series, we got to tell really charming and fun stories by tossing the Autobots and Decepticons into the colorful, magical world of Equestria. But now, dragging dark magic and friendly ponies into the sci-fi world of Cybertron lets us play with brand new tones, toys, and team-ups!

Editor Megan Brown says, “We are so excited to work with some amazingly talented writers and artists to bring this marvelous mashup back to comic stores! Just like the previous volume, many creators are contributing stories that are going to bring our favorite ponies to Cybertron and beyond, including returning writers James Asmus, Sam Maggs, Ian Flynn, and returning artists Jack Lawrence, Casey W. Coller, Priscilla Tramontano, and Tony Fleecs — all joined by some new, exciting faces! The creators on this series are exceptional, able to bridge the gap between Autobot and pony to make a colorful, vibrant world. We're thrilled for everyone (and everypony!) to see what we have in store!”

== List of issues ==
=== Series 1: Friendship in Disguise! (2020) ===
Issue	Title	Written by	Drawn by	Colored by	Publication date
1	"Transformation is Magic"	James Asmus	Tony Fleecs	Tony Fleecs and Lauren Perry	August 5, 2020
1	"Shine Like a Diamond"	Ian Flynn	Jack Lawrence	Luis Antonio Delgado	August 5, 2020
2	"Inspiring"	Ian Flynn	Sara Pitre-Durocher	Joana Lafuente	September 2, 2020
2	"They Eat Ponies, Don't They?"	Sam Maggs	Casey W. Coller	Joana Lafuente	September 2, 2020
3	"Pet Sounds"	James Asmus	Jack Lawrence	Luis Antonio Delgado	October 7, 2020
3	"The Flyin' Fox Trot"	Sam Maggs	Priscilla Tramontano	Luis Antonio Delgado	October 7, 2020
4	"Strength in Numbers"	Ian Flynn	Sara Pitre-Durocher	Joana Lafuente	November 4, 2020
4	"Finale"	James Asmus	Tony Fleecs	Lauren Perry	November 4, 2020

=== Series 2: The Magic of Cybertron (2021) ===
Issue	Title	Written by	Drawn by	Colored by	Publication date
1	"The Magic of Cybertron"	James Asmus	Jack Lawrence	Luis Antonio Delgado	April 28, 2021
1	"A Real Mother"	Sam Maggs	Casey Coller	Joana Lafuente	April 28, 2021
2	"Stunt Flying"	Ian Flynn	Priscilla Tramontano	Joana Lafuente	May 26, 2021
2	"One-Trick Pony"	Sam Maggs	Trish Forstner	Luis Antonio Delgado	May 26, 2021
3	"Sick Beats"	Tony Fleecs	Tony Fleecs and Lauren Perry	Tony Fleecs	June 30, 2021
3	"The Beauty of Cybertron"	James Asmus	Priscilla Tramontano	Luis Antonio Delgado	June 30, 2021
4	"The Mightiest Dinobot"	Ian Flynn	Casey W. Coller	Joana Lafuente	July 21, 2021
4	"Finale"	James Asmus	Jack Lawrence	Luis Antonio Delgado	July 21, 2021

== Reception ==
Issue	Publication date	Critic rating	Critic reviews	Ref.
My Little Pony/Transformers: Friendship in Disguise!
1	August 5, 2020	7.8/10	8	
2	September 2, 2020	7.7/10	3	
3	October 7, 2020	7.0/10	3	
4	November 4, 2020	6.7/10	3	
My Little Pony/Transformers: The Magic of Cybertron
1	April 28, 2021	6.5/10	2	
2	May 26, 2021	6.0/10	1	
3	June 30, 2021	4.0/10	1	
4	July 21, 2021	7.0/10	1	

== Collected editions ==
Title	Material collected	Publication date	ISBN
My Little Pony/Transformers: Friendship in Disguise!	My Little Pony/Transformers: Friendship in Disguise! #1−4	March 3, 2021	1684057590, 978-1684057597
My Little Pony/Transformers: The Magic of Cybertron	My Little Pony/Transformers: The Magic of Cybertron #1−4	November 30, 2021	1684058708, 978-1684058709

== See also ==
- My Little Pony (IDW Publishing)
- The Transformers (IDW Publishing)
- Hasbro Universe
  - Hasbro Comic Book Universe
