= Transformers (2019 comic book) =

American comic book series

- Cover A for issue #1 by Gabriel Rodríguez and Nelson Dániel

Publication information
- Publisher: IDW Publishing (licensed by Hasbro)
- Format: Ongoing series
- Genre: Action; Mystery; Political; Thriller; Science fiction
- Publication date: March 13, 2019 – June 29, 2022
- No. of issues: 43 (plus 2 specials, 1 annual and 1 tie-in)
- Main character: 2019 IDW Transformers universe

Creative team
- Written by: Patrick Ehlers; Sara Pitre-Durocher; Brian Ruckley; Dan Watters
- Pencillers: Winston Chan; Andrew Griffith; Guido Guidi; Angel Hernandez; Jack Lawrence; Anna Malkova; Bethany McGuire-Smith; Umi Miyao; Billie Montfort; Fico Ossio; Ed Pirrie; Sara Pitre-Durocher; Juan Samu; Blacky Shepherd; Cachét Whitman
- Letterers: Riley Farmer; Tom B. Long; Neil Uyetake; Tom Waltz; Nathan Widick; Jake M. Wood
- Colorists: John-Paul Bove; Heather Brackel; Josh Burcham; David García Cruz; Nelson Daniel; Evan Gauntt; Joana Lafuente; Sara Pitre-Durocher; Nahuel Ruiz
- Editors: Riley Farmer; David Mariotte; Tom Waltz

Transformers is an American comic book series that is mostly written by Brian Ruckley and was initially published twice-monthly by IDW Publishing. Based upon the Transformers franchise by Hasbro and Takara-Tomy, this series is a reboot of the previous comic book series that started with The Transformers: Infiltration in 2005 and concluded with Transformers: Unicron in 2018, taking place in a new continuity that is separate from the Hasbro Comic Book Universe.

The series debuted on March 13, 2019, and concluded on June 29, 2022, following the announcement of the Transformers comic book license leaving IDW by the end of the year.

== Premise ==
The story is set a long time ago, when Cybertron was a commerce hub across the galaxy during its age of peace. But everything gets turned upside down when a series of murders sets a chain of events that brings the inevitable war between the Autobots and Decepticons.

== Production history ==
=== Background ===
Following the bankruptcy and closure of Dreamwave Productions in January 2005, IDW Publishing acquired the Transformers comic book license in May and hired veteran writer Simon Furman to craft a rebooted continuity based on the Generation 1 toyline.

IDW's first Transformers title, set in its own continuity, was The Transformers: Infiltration, which was previewed with a #0 in October and formally launched with #1 in January 2006.

After having acquired the comic book licence of various other Hasbro properties throughout the years—such as G.I. Joe, Action Man, Rom, M.A.S.K., and Micronauts—IDW announced the Hasbro Reconstruction campaign in January 2016; a launch meant to converge these franchises in the same continuity, starting with the crossover events Revolution and First Strike.

In April 2018, it was announced that this shared continuity, the Hasbro Comic Book Universe (HCBU), would end with Transformers: Unicron in November.

=== Development ===
Transformers was first announced by IDW Publishing on December 18, 2018. The title is written by Brian Ruckley, and was initially illustrated by Angel Hernandez and Cachét Whitman (replacing Ron Joseph), and started publishing issues twice-monthly on March 13, 2019. Ruckley described the writing opportunity as a "privilege", and stated that the title would be a great opportunity for new readers to familiarize themselves with the universe and characters of the Transformers franchise, which he describes as of the "biggest [and] best that science fiction has to offer".

In February 2022, IDW announced to pass the Transformers comic book license by the end of the year.

The series concluded on June 29, 2022, with a one-shot issue titled Transformers: Fate of Cybertron.

=== Expanded material ===
- Transformers: Galaxies (2019–2020)
- Transformers: Escape (2020–2021)
- Wreckers: Tread & Circuits (2021–2022)
- Transformers: War's End (2022)

== Issues ==
Issue	Title	Written by	Drawn by	Colored by	Publication date
#1	"The World in Your Eyes: Part One"	Brian Ruckley	Angel Hernandez; Cachét Whitman	Joana Lafuente	March 13, 2019
On the utopian mechanical world of Cybertron, the newly forged Cybertronian Rubble and his mentor Bumblebee traverse the remote badlands on their way to tour an Energon station run by Brainstorm. The two are soon joined by Bumblebee's close friend Windblade, an Autobot Security Operations officer assigned to investigate some apparent problems with Brainstorm's equipment. Meanwhile, a worried Senator Orion Pax meets with Senator Megatron of the Ascenticon political movement regarding their increasingly violent rallies; as Megatron dismisses Orion's concerns, Rubble, Bumblebee, and Windblade arrive at the Energon station to find that Brainstorm has been murdered.
#2	"The World in Your Eyes: Part Two"	Brian Ruckley	Angel Hernandez; Cachét Whitman	Joana Lafuente; Josh Burcham	March 27, 2019
Security Operations head Chromia and special investigator Prowl secure the crime scene, encouraging Rubble and Bumblebee to continue their tour of Cybertron. Chromia immediately suspects The Rise, a radicalized splinter group of the Ascenticons, but further discussions are tabled when Orion requests more security forces for Megatron's latest rally. Rubble and Bumblebee arrive at the Tether, a massive space elevator connecting Cybertron to the Winged Moon, an enormous Energon harvesting station run by Wheeljack. Wheeljack offers Rubble a job at the Tether for the day, and Bumblebee returns later to discuss The Rise and Brainstorm's murder with them as the Winged Moon comes online. At the Ascenticon rally, Megatron's fierce rhetoric is interrupted when he and Senator Soundwave are attacked by snipers.
#3	"The World in Your Eyes: Part Three"	Brian Ruckley	Angel Hernandez; Cachét Whitman	Joana Lafuente; Josh Burcham	April 16, 2019
Orion, Ironhide, Chromia, and Prowl watch as Megatron unveils the Ascenticon Guard, a private counter-terrorism militia meant to make up for the failures of the Autobot Senate and Security Operations. Everyone is quickly worried about the presence of Quake among the Guard, a highly dangerous and violent veteran of the War of the Threefold Spark; Chromia and Prowl reveal to Orion that The Rise's leadership has vanished in the wake of the police crackdown, implicating them in Brainstorm's murder. With Senate leader Sentinel Prime off-world, Orion takes command as Rubble and Bumblebee continue their journey across the planet, but the latter is quickly called away to the Senate building. Windblade returns Rubble to his home, where they encounter Chromia and her neurodivergent consultant Geomotus. Against Windblade's objections, Chromia secretly installs a tracking device in Rubble's comlink while Orion meets with his mentor, Codexa, in deep hibernation within Cybertron.
#4	"The World in Your Eyes: Part Four"	Brian Ruckley	Angel Hernandez; Cachét Whitman; Sara Pitre-Durocher	Joana Lafuente; Josh Burcham	April 30, 2019
While searching for more clues in the Cybertronian badlands, Windblade, Chromia, and Geomotus encounter the reclusive hermit Cyclonus, who flees but is quickly subdued. Cyclonus begrudgingly admits he saw Brainstorm arrive at the Energon station right before his death, and the three Autobots request that he travel to the capital city of Iacon for a full interview later before departing. As the ghostly hallucinations of Cyclonus' wartime comrades chide him for not telling Chromia the full truth, Bumblebee and Rubble watch as another newly forged Cybertronian, Gauge, is introduced to the world and her new mentor Arcee. Rubble irritates Prowl and his partner Barricade by suggesting he could help with the investigation, and Bumblebee again leaves Rubble to attend Brainstorm's funeral. At the funeral, Orion and Ironhide worry about the cracks forming in their society and argue with Megatron about the actions of the Ascenticons and The Rise.
#5	"The World in Your Eyes: Part Five"	Brian Ruckley	Angel Hernandez; Anna Malkova; Sara Pitre-Durocher	Joana Lafuente; Josh Burcham	May 14, 2019
Soundwave helps record more of Megatron's political broadcasts as Chromia meets with Sideswipe regarding Energon distribution records. Sideswipe reveals that, as expected, twelve members of The Rise have gone into hiding, but two hundred more Cybertronians have also disappeared in the days since Brainstorm's death. Prowl redoubles his efforts to find a possible Voin alien witness to the murder as Rubble finishes another shift working with Wheeljack at the Tether. Although Rubble is disappointed to hear that Bumblebee is unavailable again, he suddenly finds the Voin again and impulsively gives chase to help Prowl. Bumblebee attends a meeting with Elita One to discuss joining her Ascenticon Guard but is surprised to find Soundwave instead. Soundwave blocks all incoming and outgoing transmissions to ensure privacy before telling Bumblebee the Ascenticon leadership is reluctant to trust a former Security Operations officer. Rubble loses the Voin again but suddenly happens across Quake killing it; he flees in terror and accidentally calls Prowl while trying to raise Bumblebee. Prowl desperately tries to figure out what is happening but can only listen as Quake kills Rubble.
#6	"Orion Pax: Free Fall"	Brian Ruckley	Bethany McGuire-Smith	Bethany McGuire-Smith	May 29, 2019
Orion attempts to rouse Codexa, whose long slumber means she no longer recognizes her protege; however, the name Megatron does register, and Orion reflects on his personal history with his fellow Senator. Two megacycles ago (equivalent to two thousand Earth years), in the aftermath of the War of the Threefold Spark, an archivist named Orion Pax helps the miner Megatron with recovery efforts, and the two quickly become friends while making plans for the future. Later, three hundred kilocycles before the present day (or three hundred years), Orion and Megatron visit the Tether just before the Winged Moon's official opening to catch up. As the new head archivist, Orion plans to leave Cybertron and tour its colony planets, while Megatron is running for election as a senator for the Ascenticons. To emphasize his belief that Cybertron's civilization must move with the times to avoid stagnation, Megatron encourages Orion to jump off the Moon with him, leaving the latter somewhat shaken. Orion asks Codexa if his current actions are justifiable, and she responds only that Cybertron's harmony is beginning to falter, and he must do what needs to be done.
#7	"The Cracks Beneath Your Feet: Part One"	Brian Ruckley	Angel Hernandez; Anna Malkova; Sara Pitre-Durocher	Joana Lafuente; Josh Burcham	June 11, 2019
Following Rubble's death, Windblade tries and fails to comfort a grief-stricken Bumblebee, as medical personnel Greenlight and Ratchet inform a guilt-ridden Prowl that the autopsies of the Voin and Rubble do not match the circumstances of Brainstorm's death – meaning that two killers are loose on Cybertron. Orion attempts to offer his condolences to Bumblebee but is cut short by Ironhide, who informs him that Cybertronian leader Sentinel Prime and his retinue are returning to Cybertron. Bumblebee meets Elita One at the Ascenticon headquarters for his first day on the Ascenticon Guard and is immediately met with hostility from Skytread and Refraktor. As Bumblebee notes the conspicuous absence of Quake, Cyclonus' solitary vigil at the Memorial Crater dedicated to the War of the Threefold Spark is interrupted when a Rise operative named Flamewar attacks him.
#8	"The Cracks Beneath Your Feet: Part Two"	Brian Ruckley	Angel Hernandez; Anna Malkova	Joana Lafuente; Josh Burcham	July 2, 2019
Cyclonus almost immediately overpowers the overconfident Flamewar, forcing her Rise partner Shadow Striker to step in. The old war veteran flees and Shadow Striker chews out Flamewar for jeopardizing their operation, while Megatron meets with Termagax, the founder of the Ascenticons and inventor of the Tether and Winged Moon, currently in self-imposed exile. As she informs Megatron that she has no interest in interacting with a stagnant and paralyzed Cybertron, Bumblebee adjusts to his new life in the Ascenticon Guard with Elita One's support. Although Elita sympathizes with his grief over Rubble's death and also takes note of Quake's absence, she informs him that he will accompany Megatron to his next political rally. Chromia and Prowl interrogate Quake's former psychiatrist, Froid, about his possible involvement in Rubble's murder, only for the wounded Cyclonus to appear and reveal that the missing Cybertronians are building up numbers and strength for a major offensive. Prowl escorts Cyclonus to Ratchet for medical attention, while Chromia orders Sideswipe to find Barricade and Windblade and prepare themselves for battle.
#9	"The Cracks Beneath Your Feet: Part Three"	Brian Ruckley	Angel Hernandez; Anna Malkova; Sara Pitre-Durocher	Joana Lafuente	July 17, 2019
Unable to reach Barricade, Chromia, Sideswipe, and Windblade discover a secret entrance to a bunker underneath the Memorial Crater. Meanwhile, Prowl shakes down the Cybertronian black market dealer Headlock for information on the murdered Voin, only for Headlock to reveal that he already gave that information to Barricade earlier. Chromia and Windblade enter the bunker while Sideswipe stands guard, unaware they are being watched by Flamewar, Shadow Striker, and their Rise commander Sixshot, who has already evacuated the base. As Shadow Striker prepares the bunker for self-destruct, Sixshot ambushes Chromia and Windblade while Sideswipe and Flamewar trade fire on the surface. Windblade stabs Sixshot and forces him to retreat, but the base explodes while she attempts to retrieve vital data left behind about the Risers who occupied the base, leaving her critically injured.
#10	"The Cracks Beneath Your Feet: Part Four"	Brian Ruckley	Angel Hernandez; Anna Malkova; Sara Pitre-Durocher	Joana Lafuente; Josh Burcham	August 6, 2019
Bumblebee and Elita One accompany Megatron to the Senate, passing through a sea of silent protestors marching for Brainstorm and Rubble's deaths. Froid attempts to coax the recovering Cyclonus to speak with his old friend Paragon, who Cyclonus believes was killed during the War of the Threefold Spark, as Orion and other Senators condemn Megatron's inaction over the threat The Rise poses to both the Ascenticon movement and Cybertron's continued stability. Megatron stalks out of the meeting with an ominous warning, but the crowd waiting outside the Senate building turns violent upon his arrival, and Bumblebee and Elita One reluctantly help their leader push them back by force. Later on, Megatron secretly meets with the leader of The Rise, Shockwave, who he berates for losing control of his operatives. The original plan was that The Rise, under Shockwave's strict command, would inflame social tensions just enough for Megatron's Ascenticon rhetoric to spread, but outright murder was not part of the deal. Shockwave secretly balks at Megatron's orders to take The Rise underground, while Prowl's Security Operations troops on the hunt for Barricade are turned away from the Ascenticon headquarters by Soundwave. Meanwhile, Ironhide welcomes Sentinel Prime and his retinue back to Cybertron as their personal Titan touches down, but the planet's leader is decidedly not in the mood for pleasantries.
#11	"The Cracks Beneath Your Feet: Part Five"	Brian Ruckley	Angel Hernandez; Anna Malkova	Joana Lafuente; Josh Burcham	August 27, 2019
Chromia updates Sentinel and Orion on the situation thus far: Security Operations officer Barricade has gone rogue and is presumably taking shelter inside the Ascenticon headquarters, and Soundwave refuses to admit Autobot forces. Although Sentinel advocates simply taking Barricade by force, Orion suggests a more measured approach through Megatron. Sentinel reluctantly allows Orion until sunset while Chromia gives them the list of Risers taken from the Memorial Crater base. Meanwhile, Megatron is furious with Soundwave's decision to allow Barricade safe haven and calls Shockwave to arrange for a Rise extraction squad, while Bumblebee refuses Orion's request to leave the Ascenticon Guard. Sixshot and Rise operatives Visper and Storm Cloud commence their jailbreak, and Skytread stuns Bumblebee long enough for Barricade to escape with the Risers. In their destructive wake, Megatron announces that change must come to Cybertron and modifies the Ascenticon flag into the sign of the future.
#12	"Nautica: Home"	Brian Ruckley	Sara Pitre-Durocher	Joana Lafuente	September 18, 2019
Nautica, head of the Cybertronian Xenorelations Department and a member of Sentinel Prime's inner circle, learns of the decision to return to Cybertron in the wake of Brainstorm and Rubble's deaths. In the midst of worrying about the potential political ramifications of the Voin's death, the Head of Intelligence Starscream shows her a secret message from the local Thraal ambassador, one that contains enough cultural aberrations for her to investigate alongside her bodyguard Road Rage. Although a visit to the Thraal embassy reveals nothing out of the ordinary, the Cityspeaker pilot Lightbright scans their Titan, Lodestar, to reveal faint organic signatures inside the cargo hold. Nautica and Road Rage discover the missing Thraal ambassador and a robotic bomb designed to explode on Lodestar's weak point out of protest against a population of A'ovan refugees on Cybertron. Nautica cannot stop the bomb but Road Rage and Lightbright safely eject it from the Titan before it explodes; although the injured Road Rage smoothly recovers, the Thraal ambassador dies, and Sentinel requests that Nautica keep the thwarted terrorist attack secret.
#13	"The Change in Your Nature: Part One"	Brian Ruckley	Angel Hernandez; Alex Milne	Joana Lafuente	October 17, 2019
As the Ascenticons are branded with Megatron's new insignia, Bumblebee confronts Skytread over what happened during Sixshot's raid and Barricade's escape. Although Elita One attempts to warn Bumblebee away from further confrontations, he accuses her of failing to control her own Guardsmen and requests her help investigating further. Meanwhile, Ratchet cannot identify Rubble's murderer from the list of Rise operatives Windblade acquired, as too many of them fit the autopsy's description of a large, heavy-hitting bot, but he adds that Brainstorm's unique wounds were likely inflicted by machinery. Overwhelmed with the continuous reports of civil unrest, Sentinel initiates a police crackdown across Cybertron; as patrols scour the planet's badlands for more Rise bunkers, Sideswipe and Springer encounter a group of Risers led by Ruckus stealing Energon from a processing station. The firefight between the Risers and the Autobots quickly turns into a stalemate inside a dormant Titan, while Bumblebee and Elita break into Soundwave's private files to find that he purged Barricade and Quake's files. Although Soundwave catches them in the act, Elita successfully bluffs their way out of the situation and she warns Bumblebee to stop investigating as they mobilize at the Titan. Back at Security Operations headquarters, Ratchet informs Chromia he has identified a possible suspect that fits all the requirements for Brainstorm's murder: an ex-miner, ex-Intelligence operative affiliated with the Rise who has both recently vanished and possesses built-in drills named Frenzy.
#14	"The Change in Your Nature: Part Two"	Brian Ruckley	Anna Malkova; Bethany McGuire-Smith	Joana Lafuente	November 6, 2019
The Risers barricaded inside the dormant Titan refuse to negotiate with Security Operations forces, and Chromia and Springer prepare for a protracted standoff even as police sniper Javelin is shot by a Rise bullet. Chromia orders Sideswipe, Strongarm, and Kup to breach the Titan as Nautica trades information with the other Voin for a second-hand account of Brainstorm's murder, including the fact that the Voin Quake killed was a very important member of their society. The Security Operations attempt to forcibly breach the Titan fails as Soundwave and the Ascenticon Guard arrive to defuse the situation. Acid Storm and Refraktor stay behind as Bumblebee and Elita One accompany Soundwave to the Titan; Bumblebee follows the Senator inside as Starscream arrives and presses Refraktor, his private mole inside the Ascenticons, for any important updates. Bumblebee watches as Soundwave attempts to bargain with the Risers, only for them to slip up and admit they know more about Brainstorm's murder. Soundwave and Bumblebee leave the Titan as it suddenly explodes behind them.
#15	"The Change in Your Nature: Part Three"	Brian Ruckley	Anna Malkova; Bethany McGuire-Smith	Joana Lafuente; Josh Burcham	January 1, 2020
Megatron stews over Sentinel Prime's public condemnation of the Ascenticon movement, and he orders Jhiaxus to over-fuel his systems while reflecting on his past. Once a simple miner and later a famed gladiator, Megatron was drafted during the War of the Threefold Spark and survived a one-on-one encounter against the enemy leader Exarchon with help from Strika's heavy artillery unit. He soon understood that Exarchon's twisted will was the source of his terrible reputation and fell in with Termagax and the Ascenticons after the war to protest the now-complacent Cybertronian society. But in time, Termagax left the movement behind, and Megatron concluded that only his will was strong enough to change Cybertron for the better. As Megatron departs Iacon for the badlands, Bumblebee reports to Orion and Chromia with information that Shockwave is leading the Rise and Soundwave is helping him, while Orion tells him that Frenzy and Quake are the likely culprits of Brainstorm and Rubble's deaths, respectively. Megatron meets with Shockwave, Sixshot, and Slipstream at the main Rise headquarters and promptly brutalizes the under-fuelled Shockwave, announcing that he is formally dissolving the Rise and taking command of its resources. Meanwhile, Orion and Chromia share their findings with Sentinel, who promptly issues arrest warrants for Shockwave, Sixshot, Frenzy, Barricade, Quake, and Soundwave.
#16	"The Change in Your Nature: Part Four"	Brian Ruckley	Anna Malkova; Bethany McGuire-Smith	Joana Lafuente; Josh Burcham	January 29, 2020
As the Senate adjourns a tense emergency meeting, Senator Heretech of the pious Reversionist faction informs Megatron that an upcoming Senate debate is, in fact, a secret sting operation meant to capture Soundwave and formally denounce the Ascenticon cause. After Heretech leaves, Starscream reveals himself and warns Megatron that Bumblebee and Orion Pax may be plotting against him. Nautica and Road Rage watch as Voin warriors arrive on Cybertron to avenge the dead Voin, while Elita One raises her suspicions of Soundwave's brazen actions toward Megatron. As Megatron chews out Soundwave for his carelessness, a Rise squadron led by Slipstream breaks into an ancient bunker used to communicate with Titans, and the Cityspeaker Skystalker crashes the Titan communication network to secretly awaken the dormant Titan Vigilem.
Valentine's Day Special	—N/a	Patrick Ehlers	Jack Lawrence	Josh Burcham	February 14, 2020
Glyph is a data analyst who has always wanted a more active role in the Xeno-Relations Department and gets her chance when Nautica asks her to study the native civilization on the remote world of SDS-359. For security purposes, Glyph recruits her old friend Tap-Out, a former gladiator with a decreasing career, to serve as her bodyguard. After arriving at SDS-359, Tap-Out is unexpectedly celebrated by the natives for his fighting prowess. Over the next several days, Tap-Out defeats several monstrous creatures for the natives' amusement while Glyph's research stalls. She finally confronts him and requests that he attempt to speak with SDS-359's inhabitants properly; unfortunately, Tap-Out's words anger the natives, who release the largest monster for him to fight. Glyph kills the creature and saves Tap-Out, an act celebrated by the natives and that causes the two Cybertronians to confess their love for one another. After finishing her report, Glyph returns with Tap-Out to Cybertron.
Valentine's Day Special	"Open Comms"	Sara Pitre-Durocher	Sara Pitre-Durocher	Sara Pitre-Durocher	February 14, 2020
Cosmos serves as Cybertron's Chief of Space Security, a menial job that mainly consists of patrolling the space around the Winged Moon, gathering space debris, and rescuing Gears from various mishaps. One day, though, the bored and lonely Cosmos accidentally starts a conversation with another lonely space-faring Cybertronian named Blast Off, working as an orbital transport specialist. Their talk soon grows into a long-distance romantic relationship, and Blast Off returns to Cybertron to meet Cosmos face-to-face.
#17	"The Change in Your Nature: Part Five"	Brian Ruckley	Anna Malkova; Bethany McGuire-Smith	Joana Lafuente; Josh Burcham	February 19, 2020
Their work complete, Slipstream and the other Risers escape aboard Astrotrain as Cyclonus leaves the ruined Memorial Crater to confront Sixshot at Hot Spot's insistence. On the Winged Moon, Gears attempts to remove the Rise technology siphoning Energon away from the Moon, but Huffer and Wheeljack are forced to save him after an explosion sends him careening into space. Cosmos interrupts their bickering to warn them that an unfamiliar Titan is rapidly approaching the Moon, while Blaster realizes that Sentinel Prime's personal Titan Lodestar is their only chance of stopping Vigilem. Lodestar and Lightbright engage the much larger, stronger, and more experienced Vigilem as Wheeljack calls for an evacuation of the Winged Moon. Lodestar suffers heavy damage and is unable to prevent Vigilem from reaching the Moon's surface, where he destroys the Tether.
#18	"Arcee/Greenlight: Run"	Brian Ruckley	Anna Malkova; Bethany McGuire-Smith	Josh Burcham	March 11, 2020
The newly forged Cybertronian Gauge has happily settled into life with her mentor Arcee and her partner Greenlight, oblivious to the tensions rising between the adults; Greenlight wants to leave the increasingly dangerous Cybertron with the Reversionist faction, while Arcee is confident they can continue living safely. Greenlight and Arcee pick Gauge up from an architectural shift under Grapple, but their walk home is interrupted as the Tether crashes on Cybertron and levels parts of Iacon. The trio joins the impromptu rescue effort when Gauge accidentally exposes a group of looters stealing Energon cubes; both Gauge and Arcee are wounded during the fight, and although Security Operations officers arrest the looters, Arcee finally agrees to leave Cybertron. They push their way through the crowd of Cybertronians attempting to board the Reversionist ship Exodus, and Arcee distracts the guards long enough for Greenlight and Gauge to sneak aboard. As the Exodus departs Cybertron, Arcee boards the ship just in time and reunites with her family. (Note: To be continued in Transformers: Galaxies #7–9.)
#19	"Rise of the Decepticons: All Fall Down"	Brian Ruckley	Anna Malkova	Joana Lafuente	March 18, 2020
Windblade finally recovers from the injuries sustained in the Rise bunker's explosion, but Ratchet grimly updates her that the Tether has fallen. Megatron, saddened at the destructive turn things have taken, nevertheless continues onward with his plan; in addition to placing Soundwave under the Ascenticon Guard's protection and further bolstering their ranks with Rise operatives, he decides that Bumblebee and Elita One have outlived their usefulness. Soundwave confines Elita One to quarters and promotes Skytread to her former position, who immediately sends his hated rival Bumblebee off to an abandoned storage building. There, Bumblebee is ambushed by Rise members Catgut and Treadshot and is narrowly saved by Chromia. Nautica and Prowl attempt to dissuade the Voin warrior as Orion and Sentinel discuss the rapidly declining situation, with Sentinel shutting down Orion's plan to recruit the imprisoned Great General Pyra Magna to help, and Security Operations commanders Novastar and Hound assemble a proactive counterterrorism team including Windblade, Springer, Sureshot, Blades, and Smokescreen. Meanwhile, a furious Shockwave's interrogation of Skystalker is interrupted by the equally furious Sixshot, who demands to know why Risers are leaving for the Ascenticon Guard en masse and why Mindwipe has taken a squadron to find more Energon.
#20	"Rise of the Decepticons: Swindle's"	Brian Ruckley	Anna Malkova; Bethany McGuire-Smith	John-Paul Bove	June 17, 2020
As Prowl listens to the bleak newscast, including Sentinel Prime's public denouncement of the Ascenticons and issuing bounties on several key Rise members, his old colleague Nightbeat informs him that he might want to speak to a recently arrested criminal. Hound denies Sideswipe's request to join his portion of the new counterterrorism unit as Nightbeat, Strongarm, and Bumper watch Prowl interrogate Singe, a rioter arrested for stealing Energon during the Tether's collapse. Although the three Security Operations bots are unnerved by Prowl's violent interrogation, Singe informs them of a business link between The Rise and a black-market Energon fencing operation run by Swindle. Prowl's team and Sideswipe stake out Swindle's as Mindwipe and Visper demand more Energon from the shady businessman, but the two Risers quickly realize that they have been compromised when they spot Bumper in the crowd. The other Security Operations bots storm the building as Mindwipe hypnotizes Bumper to cover his and Visper's escape; Storm Cloud arrives for support and is taken down, while Prowl arrests Swindle for harboring wanted Rise members. Mindwipe informs Shockwave of Storm Cloud's capture as Sixshot prepares to scuttle the current Rise headquarters, warning the secured Frenzy and Quake not to cause any trouble during the move.
#21	"Rise of the Decepticons: Tremors"	Brian Ruckley	Billie Montfort; Blacky Shepherd	John-Paul Bove; Joana Lafuente	July 22, 2020
Out in the Cybertronian hinterlands investigating unusual seismic activity, a geologic team consisting of Geomotus, Beachcomber, Landmine, and Azimuth instead encounters the gigantic Cybertronian Leviathan trapped inside a crevasse. Elsewhere, Windblade meets with Bumblebee at a Security Operations safehouse, who has renounced the Ascenticons and is considered a key witness against them. As Megatron broadcasts yet another fiery political speech against the Autobots across Cybertron, Rage attempts to quietly transport a highly dangerous group of Risers across the wilderness, consisting of Quake, Frenzy, Rumble, Fangry, and Triggerhappy, only for the convoy to fall into another crevasse. The geologic team investigates the crash, and Landmine calls in Security Operations upon recognizing Quake while Geomotus hides within Leviathan. The sociopathic Triggerhappy ambushes the remaining geologists but Windblade and the other counterterrorism operatives arrive in time to save them. As the Voin warrior demands to see Quake, Blaster and Glyph bring the Titan communications network back online while the battle between the Risers and the Autobots rages on. Upon hearing Geomotus' concern for his friends, Leviathan unexpectedly transforms into her colossal robot mode to join the fight.
#22	"Rise of the Decepticons: Prisoners"	Brian Ruckley	Anna Malkova	John-Paul Bove	August 12, 2020
Sixshot singlehandedly holds off Novastar's entire team with his six alternate modes, but Leviathan's arrival quickly turns the tide; although Quake damages her knee, the giant Cybertronian manages to subdue him and drives Sixshot, Rumble, and Frenzy away. Sentinel Prime organizes a public spectacle of Quake's arrest against Orion's protests, who asks Ironhide and the Senate Guard to support Chromia's security detail in holding the crowds back. As Nautica and Road Rage report losing the Voin warrior, Soundwave orders Skytread and the Ascenticons in the crowd to ensure Quake escapes. Quake breaks away from his police escort and ducks into an alleyway, where he encounters the Voin warrior. As Bumblebee gives chase, Quake tricks the Voin into removing his restraints and kills it, but Bumblebee catches him and fatally slices his head and spark chamber off before he can escape. A Security Operations detail arrives and immediately places the shellshocked Bumblebee under arrest.
#23	"Rise of the Decepticons: We Have Deceived You"	Brian Ruckley	Anna Malkova	Joana Lafuente	September 16, 2020
Sentinel Prime's historic decision to convene the Senate without Megatron or another Ascenticon representative only strains Cybertronian society further, and the Senate Guard and Security Operations forces are stretched thin around the building as Megatron, Strika, and Ratbat approach. Although Orion tries one last time to dissuade Megatron from his chosen path, he has no choice but to allow the three Senators inside. Orion, Groove, and Flareup reinforce the Senate security inside as Megatron dramatically interrupts Sentinel's condemnation of the deceptive Ascenticons. As Starscream visits Bumblebee in his cell to propose an alliance, Megatron embraces the derogatory "Decepticon" term Sentinel has used for the Ascenticons and announces that today marks the beginning of a new day on Cybertron and the end of the Senate. With that, the finest warriors of the new Decepticon order attack the Senate, blowing through the security detail and subduing all the Senators inside. Although Ironhide attempts to breach the building himself, Strika easily repels him and proclaims that Cybertron's future belongs to the Decepticons.
#24	"Wheeljack: Orbital Decay"	Brian Ruckley	Beth McGuire-Smith	Beth McGuire-Smith	October 28, 2020
As the last of the evacuation shuttles leaves the Winged Moon in the wake of the Tether's destruction, Wheeljack focuses on the impossible task ahead: he, Gears, Huffer, Cosmos, and Lancer have only seven days to repair the heavily damaged Moon before it flies into Cybertron's sun, destroying one-sixth of the planet's Energon supply. The five engineers test theory after theory and encounter failure after failure while two days pass and the Moon is damaged further traveling through the remnants of the dead Titan Croaton. To make matters worse, Lancer discovers and captures the Ascenticon spy Enemy hiding aboard the last evacuation shuttle, who had previously hijacked the Moon's Energon supply for The Rise. With just three days left, Wheeljack proposes lining the Moon's wings with explosives and igniting the stored Energon to break its erratic orbit. Surprisingly, their insane plan works, but the engineers' festivities are cut short by the return of Slipstream's squadron, "Team Stream," who plan to steal what remains of the Moon. (Note: To be continued in Transformers: Escape.)
#25	"War World: Prime"	Brian Ruckley	Anna Malkova	Joana Lafuente	December 9, 2020
Fleeing the Winged Moon to gather reinforcements, Wheeljack crash-lands in Iacon only to be shot by Decepticons Runabout and Runamuck and saved by Autobots Slapdash and Streetwise. Megatron gloats to the imprisoned Sentinel and Orion about his victory as Ironhide and Chromia secretly organize the scattered Autobot forces for a counterattack on the Senate building. Novastar's team leaves to investigate the Winged Moon as Hound and Kup launch a diversionary attack on the Decepticons, leaving Ironhide's forces free to break into the building's holding cells and free the prisoners. As the Autobots regroup to continue searching the Senate for more prisoners, Megatron authorizes Strika's special forces unit to eliminate any resistance. Sentinel, Orion, and Chromia attempt to secure a communications tower under fire from Decepticon fliers Nova Storm, Acid Storm, and Ion Storm while Strika's Heavies engage the Autobot soldiers inside the main Senate chamber. Autobots Roulette, Chainclaw, and the Decepticon Clench are killed while Sentinel is mortally wounded by the Rainmakers. In his last moments, Sentinel orders Orion to alert Perceptor, kill Starscream, and pass the Matrix of Leadership to Ultra Magnus, but Chromia presses Orion to accept the Matrix himself. Orion is transported to an ethereal landscape inside the Allspark itself, where a mysterious spirit encourages the young Senator to shoulder the burdens of leadership. As he returns to the physical plane and rises to his feet, the new leader of the Autobots declares that Orion Pax is gone – and in his place stands Optimus Prime!
#26	"War World: Awakenings"	Brian Ruckley	Anna Malkova	David Garcia Cruz	December 30, 2020
The former Great General Pyra Magna is released from prison as Optimus Prime addresses the Autobot forces at their makeshift headquarters: although all-out war is far from his first choice, he is committed to doing anything and everything to save innocent and defeat Megatron's tyranny. Across Iacon, Megatron orders Strika to convert the ruins of the Senate building into a prison for the remaining Senators, while his plans to seize control of Iacon's infrastructure are interrupted when Starscream requests a meeting. After Sentinel Prime's funeral, Ironhide voices his and others' objections to recruiting Pyra Magna as the old war veteran reunites with her teleporting loyalist Jumpstream, who she orders to assemble the other "Companions." Meanwhile, Skytread interrupts the Decepticon leader just as he draws his weapon on the scheming Starscream to report that Termagax has returned, furious at the desecration of her Ascenticon values. Megatron's retort makes Termagax see that he never cared about any of her lessons or teachings, desiring only power for himself; her old pupil destroys her with an arm-mounted fusion cannon, only to find that Termagax sent a fake drone body in her place as the real Termagax moves her mobile fortress deeper into the Cybertronian wilderness.
#27	"War World: Moon"	Brian Ruckley	Fico Ossio	David Garcia Cruz	January 20, 2021
Sky Lynx carries Novastar and her Autobot forces to reinforce the Winged Moon against "Team Stream," who are taken by surprise while attempting to find a way inside the Moon's central control room. As Shadow Striker, Sunstorm, Blackjack, and Tracer delve into the Moon and free the abandoned Enemy, they quickly realize the remaining engineers have hidden booby traps and obstacles all around the control room. Shadow Striker is recalled to the Moon's surface to assist in the continuing firefight as Gears and Lancer accidentally betray the entrance's location to the Decepticons. Out of time and options, Lancer deliberately creates a miniature black hole to detonate the Moon's remaining Energon, permanently corrupting Sunstorm's systems and forcing the other Decepticons to fall back. As Sky Lynx prepares to take the engineers back to Cybertron, Cosmos volunteers to stay behind and repair the station, inviting Blast Off to join him.
#28	"War World: Hunt"	Brian Ruckley	Anna Malkova	David Garcia Cruz	March 31, 2021
Cyclonus breaks into the Decepticon headquarters looking for Sixshot, taking down Crasher as he does so. Meanwhile, Refraktor updates Starscream on the Decepticon takeover of Iacon; both the Energon storage fields and the Titan Net communications hub have been conquered, but Refraktor's mission to liberate a small group of criminals fell through when he and Skytread found that some of the prisoners had already escaped. One such prisoner was Swindle, whose employees broke him and a select group of cellmates, including Bumblebee, out in exchange for higher pay. Soundwave stages a scripted interview in Megatron's favor and Starscream notes with smug satisfaction that his moles inside the Autobots and Decepticons have already their leaders about a much bigger prize hidden beneath the Forge Pyramid, where new Cybertronians are brought to life. Cyclonus angrily challenges Sixshot to a duel in memory of the destroyed Memorial Crater but agrees to join him when Sixshot reveals that their old foe Pyra Magna is free and stands with the Autobots. Meanwhile, Swindle and his new crew return to Swindle's, where they find the missing Senator Deathsaurus engrossed in infinitely killing a virtual Cliffjumper after the latter foiled his plans on the planet Probat (Note: As depicted in Transformers: Galaxies #5–6.)
#29	"War World: Titans"	Brian Ruckley	Anna Malkova	David Garcia Cruz	May 19, 2021
The new Decepticon operatives of the Titan Net inform Megatron that they cannot awaken any more orbiting Titans as Ironhide recruits Javelin and the remaining Senate Guard forces for Optimus Prime's personal security detail. Optimus leads a team of Autobots to the Forge Pyramid to meet with Perceptor, who reveals that sixteen new Titansparks have emerged from the Well of All Sparks since the end of the War of the Threefold Spark, diverted into permanent storage for lack of resources and Energon. Wanting the Titansparks for himself, Megatron orders Strika's Heavies and a large Decepticon force to storm the Pyramid; as the Autobots retreat further into the Pyramid and learn that the facility is self-destructing, Perceptor chooses not to save the Titansparks as everyone evacuates. Meanwhile, Megatron orders the Titan Net operatives to halt the Titans' orbits, sending them crashing down across Cybertron's surface and unearthing a heavily damaged Cybertronian named Provoke.
#30	"War World: We Are Not Meant to Be Darkness"	Brian Ruckley	Anna Malkova	David Garcia Cruz	May 26, 2021
Optimus schedules one final round of negotiations with Megatron, and the two leaders meet by hologram through intermediaries Pyra Magna and Strika. The conversation almost immediately collapses, with Optimus' defiant declaration of resistance prompting Megatron to end the call, but Strika blocks all further incoming and outgoing transmissions to speak privately with her former comrade. Although Pyra refuses to stand alongside Strika again, the former Great General instead summons Cyclonus to execute her; in response, Pyra's former soldiers from the War of the Threefold Spark, including Sunstreaker, Jumpstream, Windcharger, and Rust Dust, engage Strika's forces. Cyclonus manages to corner Pyra Magna alone but is surprised when she refuses to fight back and accepts her death. The old warrior spares her at the urgings of his ghostly hallucinations, and Pyra lets him leave before informing her troops they will support Optimus, who has led the Autobots out of the devastated Iacon and into hiding within the Cybertronian badlands.
Annual 2021	"Light/Star"	Brian Ruckley	Alex Milne	John-Paul Bove	June 9, 2021
Following the Tetherfall on Cybertron, Lightbright and Lodestar continue their search for the missing Vigilem, outfitting themselves with new armor, weapons, and crewmates in the form of Scattershot's Technical Solutions team. They soon rediscover Vigilem's trail and follow it to the asteroid colony of Hexagon, where the Titan is currently refueling and repairing. The colony's administrator Thunderwing refuses to surrender Vigilem fearing collateral damage to Hexagon, while Vigilem himself ignores Lodestar's attempts at conversation. Scattershot's team board the colony to manually disconnect Vigilem and are met by Thunderwing's mercenary security officers Bludgeon, Dirge, Ramjet, and Thrust. Although the mercenaries attempt to separate and eliminate the Technical Solutions team, they escape as Thunderwing explains his true plan to use Vigilem as his ticket into the upper echelons of the Decepticon hierarchy. Although Lightspeed manages to disconnect Vigilem, he is met by the twisted scientist Airachnid, who has partnered with Thunderwing to recreate the legendary Artifacts of the Thirteen Primes. Lightspeed's teammates reappear, and they fall into Airachnid's experimental replica of the Enigma of Combination, merging the team into the gigantic combiner Computron. As Thunderwing reluctantly ejects Computron and part of Hexagon into space, Lightbright and Lodestar pursue Vigilem and use an imploder to destroy the mad Titan, although Lodestar's right arm is vaporized. The two return to pick up the Technobots but are interrupted by reports of the destruction of Cybertron's orbiting Titans, making Lodestar the very last Titan.
#31	"Lords of Misrule: Test Flight I"	Brian Ruckley	Angel Hernandez; Anna Malkova	David Garcia Cruz	June 23, 2021
Cyclonus stands vigil over Provoke's healing body as Optimus welcomes Ultra Magnus back to Cybertron, updating him on the various events that have transpired in his absence (Note: As depicted in Transformers: Galaxies #10–12.) – the Decepticons have taken Iacon and incited uprisings in several other city-states, while the Autobots have evacuated wherever possible and turned the city of Darkmount into a refuge for neutral Cybertronians and organic colonists. Magnus joins the Autobots as Perceptor attempts to supercharge Jumpstream's teleportation powers using a Nucleon-powered harness, in response to Shockwave's similar enhancement of Ion Storm's electromagnetic abilities. As Jumpstream ignores Perceptor's warnings about the harness's limitations, Shockwave contains the now radioactive and insane Sunstorm before leaving to debrief Team Stream about their failed attack on the Winged Moon. Jumpstream rapidly teleports across the Cybertronian landscape before abruptly losing control and disappearing, rematerializing first in the dimensional void of unspace and then in another version of Iacon, utterly devastated and decorated with the severed heads of Autobots and Decepticons alike. Jumpstream is captured by a Voin enforcer using enslaved Cybertronians and is taken before Megatron, Shockwave, and Onslaught, who reveal as one that they are now the three facets of Exarchon.
#32	"Lords of Misrule: Test Flight II"	Brian Ruckley	Angel Hernandez; Anna Malkova	David Garcia Cruz	July 14, 2021
Jumpstream is returned to the Voin but is soon saved by a band of rebels led by Bumblebee, all of whom have lost the ability to transform by an overreliance on Nucleon. Although the rebels reveal that the Jumpstream of this universe died previously, Vortex and Triggerhappy ambush the group and kill everyone except Bumblebee. The alternate Bumblebee gives Jumpstream the last of his Nucleon, which she uses to refuel the harness and return to her original universe. Provoke miraculously recovers and reunites with Cyclonus as Perceptor and Lancer ominously discover that Jumpstream traveled into the distant future rather than an alternate universe. Meanwhile, a mysterious figure trapped in unspace follows Jumpstream's trail back to present-day Cybertron, revealed to be Skywarp.
#33	"Lords of Misrule: Swindle's II"	Brian Ruckley	Anna Malkova	David Garcia Cruz	August 4, 2021
Swindle has reopened his casino as a Decepticon-exclusive establishment but secretly probes drunken individuals for sensitive information while Trickdiamond and Bumblebee discuss mentorship, including how the former's mentor Big Wing was killed in a freak asteroid collision (Note: As depicted in Transformers: Galaxies #1–4.). After hours, Swindle informs Bumblebee that Elita One is being transferred to another prison and a team has already been assembled to disrupt the move; Bumblebee joins the team and is overcome with rage when he notices Barricade among her guards but decides not to kill him after remembering a conversation with Orion Pax right before Rubble's forging. Bumblebee, Elita, and Swindle's team return to the casino, where Bumblebee asks Swindle to forge a secret alliance with the Autobots and inform Optimus of the Enigma of Combination's whereabouts. Meanwhile, Skywarp teleports around Cybertron to learn what has transpired in his absence and eventually decides to find Megatron.
#34	"Lords of Misrule: Sea of Rust I"	Brian Ruckley	Anna Malkova	David García Cruz; Evan Gauntt	September 1, 2021
While conducting another geologic survey in the Sea of Rust, Geomotus, Landmine, and Termagax note the increased presence of frenzied metal-consuming rust worms. A Decepticon patrol discovers the location of Termagax's mobile fortress House as Bumblebee informs Optimus that Termagax has the Enigma of Combination, while Skywarp meets with Megatron and attempts to join their expedition to find House. Despite his superior army of cloned Insecticon soldiers, Shockwave orders his rival Bombshell and his drone force to retrieve Termagax and the Enigma, hoping to either succeed or undermine a potential competitor. Jumpstream awakens from her coma and informs Ratchet and Perceptor of Exarchon's imminent return as the Insecticon swarm attacks Termagax's fortress, but Sky Lynx arrives with a squadron of Autobot warriors just as House's defenses run out of ammunition.
#35	"Lords of Misrule: Sea of Rust II"	Brian Ruckley	Anna Malkova	David García Cruz; Evan Gauntt	September 22, 2021
Under Sky Lynx's command, the Autobots attack the Insecticlones from the air and on the ground, and Pyra Magna requests to speak with Termagax on behalf of Optimus Prime. Skywarp discovers Shockwave's hidden bunker and promptly runs afoul of both Team Stream and Shockwave himself, only teleporting away upon mention of the Enigma. The Autobots prepare House for a protracted siege as Pyra and Wheeljack fail to convince Termagax to surrender the Enigma; even the appearance of Optimus and the full Autobot army does not change her mind. Sixshot and the Rainmakers lead the Decepticon charge against House, and Optimus' words finally convince Termagax to release her personal drone army and join the fight.
Halloween Special	"I Have No Mouth and I Must Starscream"	Dan Watters	Bethany McGuire-Smith	Nahuel Ruiz	September 29, 2021
With the Decepticons in control of Iacon, Starscream attempts to gain control of an influential anti-Autobot task force before overhearing a conversation between Megatron and Sixshot; although the Decepticon leader has already picked Starscream to lead, Sixshot's doubts over the Seeker's loyalty causes Megatron to choose Soundwave instead. Frustrated, Starscream decides to undertake a solo mission into Iacon's wilderness to scout for Autobots, despite Runabout and Runamuck's warnings of screaming ghosts lurking beyond the city's borders. Starscream soon discovers a trapped ape-like servant of the Voin as the cause of the screams, but his attempt to free it accidentally transfers his spark into the ape's body. Inside the ape's body, Starscream unexpectedly meets the ghost of his mentor Cryak, whose immersion into Cybertron's landscape was disrupted by the ape. Driven mad after a thousand years inside the ape's body, Cryak plans to steal Starscream's body and kill as many Cybertronians as possible, but Starscream returns to it first and leaves Cryak stranded inside the ape.
#36	"Lords of Misrule: Enigmatic"	Brian Ruckley	Anna Malkova	David García Cruz; Evan Gauntt	October 27, 2021
Although Cyclonus attempts to engage with the revived Provoke, she has spent all her time studying Cybertron's archives and history since the end of the War of the Threefold Spark, drawing suspicion from Cyclonus' hallucinations. As the Autobots and Termagax's drones battle the Decepticons outside Termagax's fortress, those inside are too late to stop Skywarp from teleporting in and stealing the Enigma of Combination. Although Skywarp attempts to stop the fighting with the Enigma, he is caught off guard by Jumpstream's similar teleportation powers; the two warriors begin zapping across the sky with the Enigma as Sixshot follows close behind. The Sea of Rust's bedrock begins to shake and crack as Skywarp reclaims the Enigma, but Sky Lynx ambushes him and forces him to drop the artifact. Although Skytread retrieves it, a horde of rust worms emerge from the shattered ground and devour both, forcing the Decepticons and Autobots to retreat. Meanwhile, medic Flatline notes that Ruckus has also miraculously awoken from his coma, but his suspicion forces "Provoke" to drop the act: Exarchon has returned in Provoke and Ruckus' bodies and consumes Flatline's spark as his third form.
#37	"Darkness, Once Gazed Upon: Part One"	Brian Ruckley	Winston Chan; Guido Guidi	John-Paul Bove; Ed Pirrie	November 24, 2021
As a hidden Rumble watches, Optimus Prime and Ultra Magnus journey into the Cybertronian badlands to speak with Optimus' mentor Codexa about Exarchon. Both Codexa and Cyclonus concurrently flashback to the end of the War of the Threefold Spark: Cyclonus' squad continually loses members during the war until only Cyclonus and Provoke are left at the end. Provoke is quickly shot down during the final battle of the war, and the grief-stricken Cyclonus is dragged away from her body by Shadow Striker and Brawn. Meanwhile, Highbrow reports to Nominus Prime and the four Great Generals that Exarchon has transcended Cybertronian life: someone or something has converted him into a living parasite, able to assimilate three sparks into his being at any one time. In the present day, Codexa informs Optimus and Magnus that Exarchon has indeed returned and assimilated Ruckus' spark as a suspicious Cyclonus confronts "Ruckus" at Swindle's. Optimus and Magnus attempt to leave Codexa's chamber but are ambushed by Soundblaster and Team Stream; although Optimus escapes, Magnus is captured and escorted to Megatron.
#38	"Darkness, Once Gazed Upon: Part Two"	Brian Ruckley	Anna Malkova	David García Cruz	December 22, 2021
Although the sixteen secret Titansparks were believed destroyed during the collapse of the Forge Pyramid, the Decepticons salvaged one and plan to nurture it into an ultimate weapon capable of destroying the Autobots. Ultra Magnus attempts to warn his Decepticon captors about Exarchon's return, but Megatron ignores him despite Strika and Starscream's willingness to investigate. As Cyclonus' suspicions of "Provoke" grow, especially when she misremembers details from their comrades' funerals, Arcee returns to Cybertron and joins Smokescreen, Windblade, and Chromia on a secret mission to rescue Magnus (Note: As depicted in Transformers: Galaxies #7–9.). While sneaking through a tunnel system underneath Iacon, they accidentally encounter Swindle and secure an exit out of the city, and soon rescue Magnus from among the dozens of immobile and rusted Senators still trapped within the ruins of the Senate building. Swindle honors his end of the deal and closes the casino early for the Autobots, but a furious Trickdiamond alerts Starscream to their plan; a battalion of Decepticons led by Sixshot surrounds Swindle's as the Autobots prepare for battle.
#39	"Darkness, Once Gazed Upon: Part Three"	Brian Ruckley	Andrew Griffith	John-Paul Bove	January 19, 2022
Swindle nearly jeopardizes the Autobots' escape plan by refusing to lend them his heavy weaponry, but Sixshot's troops attack before the issue can be pushed further. Fleeing the battle, Headlock comes across "Ruckus" snooping around the off-limits areas of the casino as Smokescreen accidentally finds Swindle's armory. The battle continues as Cyclonus confronts "Provoke" about the aberrations in her personality and finally realizes what has happened; although "Provoke" attempts to escape, Cyclonus confirms that Exarchon has returned and fatally rips his spark from her body. As "Flatline," Exarchon infiltrates Shockwave's bunker in the wilderness and reunites with Shockwave and a heavily damaged Skywarp, informing his lieutenants that he requires their services once more. The damaged Autobots manage to escape the casino and the Decepticons capture Swindle instead, but a massive Cybertronian dragon erupts from the ruined basement: Exarchon has taken Deathsaurus as his newest body. (Note: To be continued in Transformers: War's End.)
#40	"A Dust of Crystals"	Brian Ruckley	Anna Malkova	David García Cruz	February 16, 2022
Holed up inside Crystal City, the Autobots prepare for a siege as Strika leads a massive Decepticon force to raze the city to the ground. Although the neutral Cybertronians and organic refugees have fled for Darkmount and backup is supposedly on its way, the Autobots must hold out as long as possible. Crystal City begins to crumble as Optimus Prime finally reunites with Bumblebee, who forgives Optimus for everything that has happened since Rubble's death. The two return to the surface to rejoin the fight, but the Decepticons soon breach the city and force the Autobots to their last stronghold. All seems lost until a light appears overhead, and both the triumphant Decepticons and embattled Autobots watch as a gigantic form crashes to Cybertron's surface: the Titan Lodestar and her pilot Lightbright have returned, heavily damaged but ready to fight.
#41	"The Landscape of Fear"	Brian Ruckley	Anna Malkova; Blacky Shepherd	David García Cruz	March 23, 2022
Although the Decepticons flee before Lodestar's massive size, Strika and her Heavies attempt to close in before Lightbright deploys their other secret weapon: the Technical Solutions team, merged into the mighty combiner Computron! Together, Lodestar and Computron give the Autobots enough time to regroup and mount a counterattack, arresting most of the Heavies and forcing Strika to agree to a temporary cease-fire. As Scattershot informs Optimus he still possesses the powers of Airachnid's Combination Core, the Autobots defending Darkmount from the continual barrage of Insecticlones receive unexpected reinforcements from House, Wheeljack, and Lodestar. Citing the numerous imminent threats to Cybertron's existence, including the rampaging rust worms, ravenous Insecticlones, and a reborn Exarchon, Optimus calls for a truce to defeat the larger enemies, to which Megatron reluctantly agrees. Meanwhile, Darkmount is running critically low on Energon and other supplies as the last Ark spacecraft nears completion, but Termagax suddenly has an idea to turn the rust worms and Insecticlones against each other.
#42	"Radical Time"	Brian Ruckley	Andrew Griffith	David García Cruz	April 27, 2022
Optimus Prime mourns the destruction of Crystal City and its priceless historical and cultural significance, but he soon turns his attention back to the problems at hand. Although Sky Lynx has already started the final evacuation to Darkmount, the Autobots have limited time to fix everything before Megatron breaks the ceasefire: Pyra Magna and the Companions are battling Exarchon in the Sonic Canyons, Novastar's team has vanished, and Perceptor reluctantly agrees to Termagax's risky plan to stop the Insecticlone swarm. Optimus leads the Autobot forces to Darkmount while the various players in Termagax's plan ready themselves for the right moment. Unfortunately, the Autobots soon run afoul of the remaining Decepticons, now under the amoral Jhiaxus' command, who force them into a compromised position directly in front of an oncoming horde of rust worms. Optimus falls unconscious and returns to the metaphysical realm inside the Matrix of Leadership, which expresses hope despite the dire situation.
#43	"End of Time"	Brian Ruckley	Anna Malkova; Ed Pirrie; Juan Samu; Blacky Shepherd	Heather Brackel; David García Cruz	May 18, 2022
Under attack from both the rust worms and the Insecticlones, the Autobots commence Termagax's last-ditch plan: Novastar's team sneaks into the Insecticlone hive to plant a receiver inside as Windblade, Springer, and Blades distract them, while Hound, Tap-Out, and Road Rage attempt to capture a live Insecticlone outside Darkmount so Termagax, Perceptor, Wheeljack, and Highbrow can reverse-engineer its programming and upload new orders to the receiver. As Optimus' forces battle both the rust worms and the Decepticons, Hound's team successfully captures an Insecticlone while Novastar and Smokescreen dispatch Bombshell, Kickback, and Shrapnel to place the receiver. Termagax sacrifices House to destroy the Insecticlone swarm as a second swarm, now running the Autobots' programming, arrives and attacks the rust worms. However, the moment of victory is spoiled when Skywarp arrives with a stolen imploder. (Note: As depicted in Transformers: War's End.)
One-shot	Fate of Cybertron	Brian Ruckley	Winston Chan; Andrew Griffith; Angel Hernandez; Alex Milne; Ed Pirrie	Josh Burcham; David García Cruz; Josh Perez	June 29, 2022
Under threat from the imploder, the Autobots and Decepticons watch as Optimus and Megatron face off one last time. Without warning, Sky Lynx and Computron disrupt the Decepticons, and Jumpstream uses the distraction to teleport Skywarp and herself into unspace, merging him with the imploder and trapping him in the void forever. Megatron reluctantly allows the Autobots safe passage to Darkmount but secretly summons the Constructicons to help destroy them. The Autobots scramble to repair Lodestar and prepare the Ark for departure, but the Decepticons soon renew their assault, joined by the Constructicons' combined form Devastator. Devastator easily dispatches Computron and Leviathan, but the latent energies of the Combination Core still within Scattershot allow him to revive Computron by adding Pipes, Javelin, Groove, Flareup, and Backstreet to the team. Now composed of ten Autobots, Computron takes down Devastator but soon falls to the Decepticon artillery; however, they stalled Megatron's forces just long enough for the Ark, Lodestar, and Sky Lynx to take off and leave Cybertron. As the Decepticons arrest the Technobots and take in their hollow victory, the Autobots retreat to the Winged Moon, now in a different solar system and crewed by Cosmos and Blast Off.

== Reception ==
Issue	Publication date	Critic rating	Critic reviews	Ref.
#1	March 13, 2019	8.1/10	21	
#2	March 27, 2019	7.0/10	13	
#3	April 16, 2019	6.4/10	8	
#4	April 30, 2019	7.0/10	7	
#5	May 14, 2019	7.3/10	8	
#6	May 29, 2019	7.7/10	5	
#7	June 11, 2019	7.7/10	7	
#8	July 2, 2019	8.1/10	5	
#9	July 17, 2019	7.3/10	5	
#10	August 6, 2019	7.2/10	6	
#11	August 27, 2019	7.6/10	5	
#12	September 18, 2019	7.3/10	5	
#13	October 17, 2019	7.9/10	6	
#14	November 6, 2019	7.6/10	4	
#15	January 1, 2020	7.9/10	2	
#16	January 29, 2020	7.1/10	4	
Valentine's Day Special	February 14, 2020	7.0/10	2	
#17	February 19, 2020	7.0/10	6	
#18	March 11, 2020	7.6/10	4	
#19	March 18, 2020	7.8/10	5	
#20	June 17, 2020	6.8/10	3	
#21	July 22, 2020	6.1/10	4	
#22	August 12, 2020	6.9/10	3	
#23	September 16, 2020	7.1/10	4	
#24	November 11, 2020	7.0/10	2	
#25	December 9, 2020	7.3/10	3	
#26	December 30, 2020	7.3/10	3	
#27	January 20, 2021	7.8/10	4	
#28	March 31, 2021	7.3/10	3	
#29	May 19, 2021	7.6/10	4	
#30	May 26, 2021	7.2/10	2	
Annual 2021	June 9, 2021	5.0/10	1	
#31	June 23, 2021	7.5/10	3	
#32	July 14, 2021	6.8/10	3	
#33	August 4, 2021	7.9/10	3	
#34	September 1, 2021	5.0/10	1	
#35	September 22, 2021	7.2/10	2	
Halloween Special	September 29, 2021	8.0/10	4	
#36	October 27, 2021	6.5/10	2	
#37	November 24, 2021	6.8/10	3	
#38	December 15, 2021	7.0/10	2	
#39	January 19, 2022	8.0/10	2	
#40	February 16, 2022	7.5/10	2	
#41	March 23, 2022	7.7/10	3	
#42	April 27, 2022	4.0/10	1	
#43	May 18, 2022	7.5/10	2	
Fate of Cybertron	June 29, 2022	6.0/10	3	
Overall		7.2/10	195	

== Collected editions ==
=== Trade paperback ===
Title	Volume	Material collected	Pages	Publication date	ISBN
Transformers, Volume One: The World in Your Eyes	1	Transformers #1−12	288	October 22, 2019	1684055318, 978-1684055319
Transformers, Volume Two: The Change in Your Nature	2	Transformers #13−18; Transformers: Galaxies #1−6	280	August 25, 2020	1684056756, 978-1684056750
Transformers, Volume Three: All Fall Down	3	Transformers #19−24; Transformers: Galaxies #7−12	280	December 15, 2020	1684057396, 978-1684057399
Transformers, Volume Four: Declaration of War	4	Transformers #25−30; Transformers Valentine's Day Special; Transformers: Escape #1−5	280	August 10, 2021	1684058066, 978-1684058068
Transformers, Volume Five: Horrors Near and Far	5	Transformers #31–36; Transformers Annual 2021; Transformers Halloween Special; Wreckers: Tread & Circuits #1–4	304	June 8, 2022	168405883X, 978-1684058839
Transformers, Volume Six: War's End	6	Transformers #37–43; Transformers: War's End #1–4; Transformers: Fate of Cybertron	304	November 1, 2022	1684059410, 978-1684059416

=== Other ===
Title	Material collected	Publication date
Transformers: Best of Optimus Prime	The Transformers (1984) #24; The Transformers (2009) #23; The Transformers: Autocracy #9; Optimus Prime #25; Transformers (2019) #6	January 5, 2022
Transformers: Best of Bumblebee	The Transformers (1984) #16; Transformers Annual 2017; Transformers: Robots in Disguise #27; Transformers (2019) #2	September 2022
Transformers: Best of Arcee	Transformers: Combiner Hunters; The Transformers (2012) #55; Optimus Prime #9; Transformers (2019) #18	October 2022
