= Transformers: Escape =

- Cover A for issue #1 by Bethany McGuire-Smith and Priscilla Tramontano.

Publication information
- Publisher: IDW Publishing (licensed by Hasbro)
- Format: Limited series
- Genre: Action; Science fiction
- Publication date: December 30, 2020 – July 7, 2021
- No. of issues: 5
- Main character(s): 2019 IDW Transformers universe

Creative team
- Written by: Brian Ruckley
- Penciller(s): Bethany McGuire-Smith
- Letterer(s): Jake M. Wood
- Colorist(s): Priscilla Tramontano
- Editor(s): Riley Farmer; David Mariotte; Tom Waltz

Transformers: Escape is an American comic book limited series set thart was released in December 2020 by IDW Publishing. Based on the Transformers franchise by Hasbro and Takara-Tomy, the series is a spin-off from the 2019 mainline comic book, set parallelly during the events of issues #25–30.

The series debuted on December 30, 2020, and concluded on July 7, 2021.

== Premise ==
After the Decepticons reveal their scheme to rule Cybertron, (Note: As depicted in Transformers #23.) chaos reigns and countless civilians, being Cybertronians and other alien species, are caught in the crossfire. Therefore, Wheeljack reunites several scientists to reactivate the Ark project and transport all those people away.

== Publication history ==
=== Background ===
Transformers was first announced by IDW Publishing on December 18, 2018. The title is written by Brian Ruckley, and was initially illustrated by Angel Hernandez and Cachét Whitman, and started publishing issues twice-monthly in March 2019. Ruckley described the writing opportunity as a "privilege", and stated that the title would be a great opportunity for new readers to familiarize themselves with the universe and characters of the Transformers franchise, which he describes as of the "biggest [and] best that science fiction has to offer".

=== Development ===
In September 2020, IDW announced the Transformers spin-off series titled Transformers: Escape to be released in December 2020. The series is written by Brian Ruckley and drawn by Bethany McGuire-Smith.

Rucley says "Escape's a cocktail of what I love most about Transformers, with some of my favorite characters and a few surprise guest stars caught up in a pretty epic escalation. I've always thought it would be a pretty terrifying, bewildering experience for aliens – non-Cybertronians – to be caught between warring factions of big transforming robots. We're exploring the question: Who are the most dangerous Cybertronians of all?"

McGuire-Smith says "I'm excited to be working on this awesome chapter in the Transformers storyline. From the perspective of Hound and Wheeljack, we will see what matters most when so many lives are on the line… and whom they can really trust as multiple threats rise."

IDW editor David Mariotte says "From the launch in 2019, the Transformers universe that's unfolded in the ongoing series and in Transformers: Galaxies has been about showing Cybertronians from exciting new perspectives. That's why we're thrilled to have Brian Ruckley and Beth McGuire-Smith reuniting to dig into the lives of faces both new and familiar as war breaks out and how they respond to the other inhabitants of Cybertron."

The series concluded on July 7, 2021, after five issues.

== Issues ==
Issue	Title	Written by	Drawn by	Colored by	Publication date
#1	"Escape: Part One"	Brian Ruckley	Bethany McGuire-Smith	Priscilla Tramontano	December 30, 2020
Wheeljack faces the new reality on Cybertron after abandoning the Winged Moon. (Note: As depicted in Transformers #24.) Hound, Nautica and Road Rage try to save A'ovan survivors that are chased by the Insecticons. Pra'tyne reveals a few children activated a signal to awaken Dai Atlas, an Immersant Titan who previously fought against the Thraal. Despite Hound was skeptical, the signal successfully awakens Dai Atlas.
#2	"Escape: Part Two"	Brian Ruckley	Bethany McGuire-Smith	Priscilla Tramontano	February 10, 2021
The Insecticons begin to hunt down potential slaves for Shockwave's experiments, starting with Skytalker, who began feeling loneliness after Vigilem disappeared during the Tetherfall. (Note: As depicted in Transformers #17.) Wheeljack and his team make a deal with Straxxus, the freelancer Senator who rules Darkmount, asking him for the three arks he owns, but a group of Decepticons plan to take the A'ovan citizens as potential slaves, with the Insecticons taking the opportunity to kill them. but Hound decides to defend the A'ovan.
#3	"Escape: Part Three"	Brian Ruckley	Bethany McGuire-Smith	Priscilla Tramontano	May 19, 2021
While the Insecticon armies attempt to kill the A'ovan, the Autobots try to convince Dai Atlas to help them, but he withdraws out of fear of attacking other Cybertronians. A brainwashed Skytalker helps the Insecticons to steal one of Shockwave's experiments that were used during the previous war. While Wheeljack's team attempts to fix Leviathan to transport the A'ovan away, the other Titans end up falling after the Pyramid was destroyed. (Note: As depicted in Transformers #29.) After arriving at Darknount, Straxxus insists on his conditions to cooperate. Shockwave sends the Combaticons to retrieve his stolen experiment.
#4	"Escape: Part Four"	Brian Ruckley	Bethany McGuire-Smith	Priscilla Tramontano	June 16, 2021
Wheeljack's team is welcomed by Straxxus, who shows three Arks ready, but the fourth one is unfinished. He also makes a statement about saving the people of Darkmount over the others. The Combaticons get inside an Immersant Titan to locate the Insecticons, but they barely escape after encountering several Insecticon clones. When those clones arrive to attack the A'ovan, Dai Atlas takes his sword and prepares to fight.
#5	"Escape: Part Five"	Brian Ruckley	Bethany McGuire-Smith	Priscilla Tramontano	July 7, 2021
As the Insecticons invade Darkmount, Staxxus locks everyone out so he and his people can escape with two Arks. While most survivors battle the clones, many of them are killed, including Dai Atlas. Straxxus escapes through one Ark, but the second one is destroyed. While the Insecticon armies succeed on occupying Darkmount, the surviving A'ovan escape through the third Ark. The Autobots stay on Cybertron in order to complete the fourth and last Ark.

== Reception ==
The initial issue received a 6.7 critic rating out of 5 reviews. Charles Hartford from But Why Tho? said it "setups an interesting story, while taking some time to get a bit philosophical with its title characters. If you have either read the previous stories this series spins off of, or don't mind not having all the details, this book is an enjoyable beginning for a new tale".

Issue	Publication date	Critic rating	Critic reviews	Ref.
#1	December 30, 2020	6.7/10	5	
#2	February 10, 2021	7.5/10	2	
#3	May 19, 2021	5.0/10	1	
#4	June 16, 2021	5.0/10	1	
#5	July 7, 2021	4.0/10	1	
Overall		5.6/10	9	

== Collected edition ==
Title	Volume	Material collected	Pages	Publication date	ISBN
Transformers, Volume Four: Declaration of War	4	Transformers #25−30; Transformers Valentine's Day Special; Transformers: Escape #1−5	280	August 10, 2021	1684058066, 978-1684058068
