= Jack Lawrence (artist) =

British comics creator (born 1975)

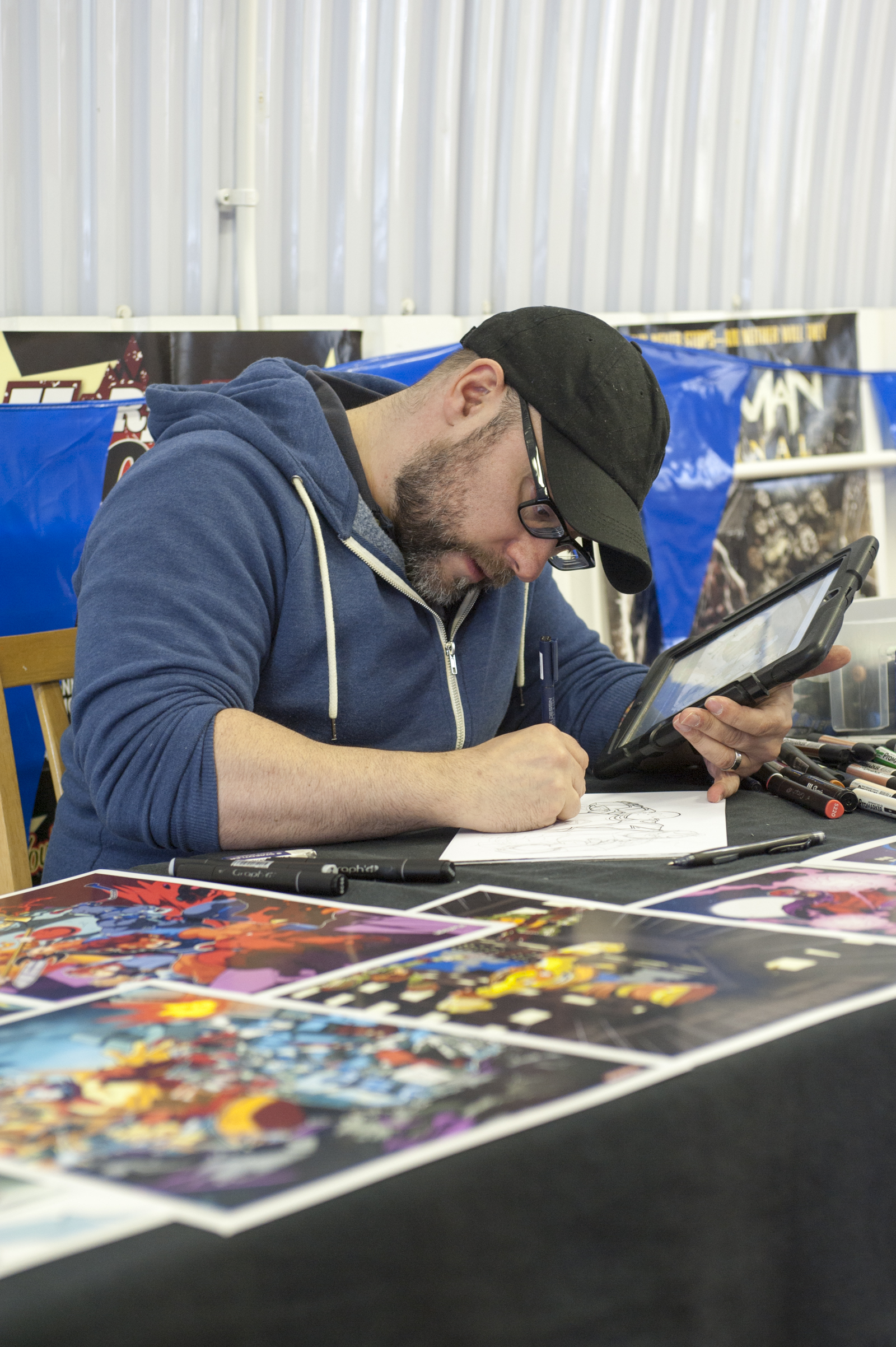
- Jack Lawrence drawing commissions during Free Comic Book Day celebrations at Dark Side Comics, UK.
- Born: 1975 (age 50–51) Canterbury, Kent, England, UK
- Areas: Writer, Penciler, Inker, Colourist, Creator

Jack Lawrence (born 1975 in Canterbury, Kent) is a British comics creator. Prior to 2002, he also worked as an animator.

== Career ==
=== Early Beginnings ===
Lawrence took a General Art and Design BTEC First Diploma at Canterbury Technical College, then went on to the KIAD at Canterbury to study for a BTEC National in the same subject. After becoming disenchanted with art education, he then worked "regular" jobs to train himself in the field he wanted to be in. In 2000, he became a character animator for the UK-based Web design company Lightmaker. He worked there for three years before becoming a freelance artist.

Lawrence came onto the comics scene with his own title, Darkham Vale, which he created, wrote, and drew, with the series running for ten issues.

He went on to find early success with Lions, Tigers and Bears, written by Mike Bullock and published by Image Comics. The four-issue series was a surprise hit that revolved around a young boy and his stuffed animal protectors.

Lawrence continued working on a wide variety of titles throughout his early career, including 2000 AD, Doctor Who Adventures, and several Marvel projects.

=== Tinpot Hobo ===
In 2012, Lawrence self-published an original science-fiction comic book, Tinpot Hobo. The series was available via convention appearances and the series' website.

=== Continued Success ===
From 2012 onwards, Lawrence worked on a number of high-profile titles. His work on DreamWorks Dragons, based on the popular How To Train Your Dragon franchise, Skylanders (IDW Publishing) and Teenage Mutant Ninja Turtles were met with critical acclaim.

=== Transformers ===
In 2016, Lawrence began working on a handful of Transformers (IDW Publishing) titles. As a lifelong Transformers fan, Lawrence had previously worked with author James Roberts, and Roberts's frequent collaborator Nick Roche, on projects for the Transmasters UK fan fiction group. The trio reunited for the critically acclaimed Transformers: Lost Light series in late 2016.

Transformers: Lost Light #1 debuted at number 176 on Diamond Comic Distributors best-selling comics ranking for December 2016, with 11,342 copies distributed, being the ninth best-selling comic of IDW Publishing in that month.

Lawrence continues to work on Transformers (IDW Publishing) titles, and is a regular guest at TFNation and TFCon, the largest UK and international Transformers fan conventions.

=== Sonic The Hedgehog ===
Continuing his work with IDW Publishing, Lawrence began working on Sonic the Hedgehog (IDW Publishing) in early 2019.

Whilst initially providing main and alternate covers for various Sonic the Hedgehog titles, Lawrence ultimately ended up illustrating two highly acclaimed mini-series; Sonic the Hedgehog: Bad Guys and Sonic the Hedgehog: Scrapnik Island.

== Bibliography ==
=== Early Work ===
- Darkham Vale #1–10 (2003–2004), published by Autumn Press Comics
  - Collected as Darkham Vale Vol. 1 (tpb, 150 pages, 2004, ISBN 978-1771352086)
  - Collected as Darkham Vale Vol. 2 (tpb, 136 pages, 2004, ISBN 978-1905071012)
- Darkham Vale: The Dracou Imperative One-Shot (2004), published by Autumn Press Comics
- Go Go Gorilla – Cover (2004), published by Ape Entertainment
- 2000AD #1415 (2004), published by Rebellion Developments
  - "Off-Ramp" story featuring Sinister Dexter.
- The Hammer Kid #0 (2006), published by Astounding Studios
- Lil' Hellions Day At The Zoo (2006), published by Silent Devil Productions
- Young Bottoms in Love Anthology (2007), 'Terminator', initially a webcomic later published by Poison Press
- Goblin Chronicles #1 – Cover (2008), published by Ape Entertainment
- Doctor Who Adventures – 'How To Draw' feature (2008–2009), published by BBC Magazines
- Judge Dredd Megazine #275, #279–283 (2009), published by Rebellion Developments
- Catch Heroes – One-Shot (2010), published by Jungle Casterman
- Tinpot Hobo #1–4 (2011–2014), published by Kothkrom Studios
- Richie Rich #1–4 – Covers (2011), published by Ape Entertainment
- Casper's Scare School #1–4 – Covers (2011), published by Ape Entertainment
- Angry Birds Magazine #1–4 – Covers, interior illustrations (2014), published by Egmont UK

=== Eaglemoss Publications ===
- Jackie Chan Adventures (2004–2006)
- The Classic Marvel Figurine Collection #93, #95, #114, #157–158, #199 (2008–13)
- Spider-Man Tower of Power (2008)
- Gogos Mega Metropolis (2009–2011)
- Batman Automobilia (2012)

=== Image Comics ===
- Lions, Tigers and Bears #1–4 (2005)
  - Collected as Lions, Tigers & Bears Volume 1: Fear And Pride (tpb, 128 pages, 2006, ISBN 978-1582406572)

=== Panini Comics UK ===
- A.T.O.M. #1–29 (2005–2007)
- Marvel Rampage (2006)
- Spectacular Spider-Man #165 (2008)
- Cartoon Network Magazine (2008), 'Ben 10'
- Teenage Mutant Ninja Turtles #2–4, #6, #8 (2013)

=== IDW Publishing ===
- Skylanders: Trap Team #12 (2015)
- Skylanders: SuperCharges #1–6 (2016)
- Skylanders Spyro & Friends Quarterly: Full Blast (2017)
- Skylanders Spyro & Friends Quarterly: Goldslinger (2017)
- Skylanders Spyro & Friends Quarterly: Biting Back (2018)
- Transformers: Lost Light #1–7, #10–12, #16–18, #21, #23, #25 (2016–2018)
- Sonic the Hedgehog #15–16, #19–20, #23, #29, #31, #33, #64 – Cover (2019)
- Sonic the Hedgehog Annual (2019)
- Star Trek vs Transformers (tpb, 96 pages, 2019, ISBN 978-1684054367)
- Transformers Valentine's Day Special One-Shot (2020)
- Sonic the Hedgehog: Bad Guys #1–4 (2020)
- My Little Pony/Transformers: Friendship in Disguise! #1, #3 (2020)
- My Little Pony/Transformers: The Magic of Cybertron #1, #4 (2021)
- Transformers: Wreckers – Tread & Circuits #1–4 (2021)
- Transformers: Wars End #2, #4 (2022)
- Godzilla: Monsters & Protectors Summer Smash #1 – Cover (2023)
- TMNT Saturday Morning Adventures – Covers (2023)
- Endless Summer: My Little Pony – Cover (2023)
- Endless Summer: TMNT Saturday Morning Adventures – Cover (2023)
- Endless Summer: D&D Saturday Morning Adventures – One-Shot (2023)
- Endless Summer: Sonic The Hedgehog – One-Shot (2023)
- TMNT Saturday Morning Adventures: Halloween Special – One-Shot (2023)
- Sonic The Hedgehog Halloween Special – One-Shot – Cover (2023)
- TMNT/Usagi Yojimbo Saturday Morning – One-Shot #1 (2024)
- Sonic The Hedgehog Annual 2024 – One-Shot – Cover (2024)
- Star Trek: Lower Decks #3–6 (2025)
- Sonic The Hedgehog Chaotix 30th Anniversary – One-Shot – Cover (2025)

=== Hachette UK ===
- I, Hero: Tyranno Quest – Books 1–4 (Cover and Interior Art) (2012)
- I, Hero: Blood Crown Quest – Books 1–4 (Cover and Interior Art) (2013)
- I, Hero: Atlantis Quest – Books 1–4 (Cover and Interior Art) (2014)
- I, Hero: Immortals – Books 1–4 (Cover and Interior Art) (2015)

=== Titan Books ===
- Dreamworks Dragons #3, #5 (2014)

=== Web and Circus ===
- Zoovolution (pencils, inks, colour) (2008–2009)

== Personal life ==
Lawrence is gay.
