= The Midas Flesh =

Science fiction comic book series

The Midas Flesh is a 2014 comic book limited series by Ryan North, with art by Braden Lamb and Shelli Paroline, exploring the legend of King Midas within a science fictional context. It ran for 8 issues, and was published by Boom! Studios.

== Synopsis ==
Millennia after King Midas accidentally transformed the Earth into gold and killed all life on the planet, fugitives from an oppressive galactic civilization arrive, seeking to use his still-intact corpse as a weapon.

== Reception ==
ComicsAlliance called it "funny, imaginative and remarkably dramatic" and "probably North's most serious work to date". Las Vegas Weekly praised the "relaxed, witty style" of the dialogue, but noted that the story had "more comedy and probably more fantasy (...) than hard science [fiction]". At Comic Book Resources, Kelly Thompson lauded it as "absolutely engaging and heart-stopping", with protagonists who are "charming, lovable, and desperately heroic", and art that was "clean and crisp, with an emphasis on excellent character acting and smooth functional storytelling"; Thompson did, however, fault the series' conclusion as "a bit of a deus ex machina", saying that since the story "relied heavily on science and smart decisions", it was "frustrating" to have gods appear, even if they had been established as part of the initial worldbuilding and do not actually "save the day".

The series was a finalist for the 2015 Joe Shuster Award, 'Comics for Kids' category.

== History ==
North has stated that his inspiration for The Midas Flesh was a 2008 installment of his webcomic Dinosaur Comics, in which he described the basic plot; "shortly after", he wrote the first version of the comic's script. He has credited the experience of writing that script (which he describes as having had a "really cool" story, but "cardboard [characters] I didn't like") as having given him the confidence to accept Boom! Studios' offer to write the comic book adaptation of Adventure Time.
