= Transformers: Galaxies =

Comic book series

- Cover for issue #1 by Livio Ramondelli.

Publication information
- Publisher: IDW Publishing (licensed by Hasbro)
- Genre: Anthology; Science fiction; Thriller
- Publication date: September 25, 2019 — December 30, 2020
- No. of issues: 12
- Main character: 2019 IDW Transformers universe

Creative team
- Written by: Tyler Bleszinski; Brandon M. Easton; Cohen Edenfield; Kate Leth; Sam Maggs
- Pencillers: Andrew Griffith; Alex Milne; Livio Ramondelli; Umi Miyao
- Letterers: Tom B. Long; Val Lopez; Jake Wood
- Editors: Riley Farmer; David Mariotte; Tom Waltz

Transformers: Galaxies is an anthology comic book series by IDW Publishing. It is a spin-off to 2019's Transformers comic book, featuring various stories about many other characters outside the main storyline.

The series began on September 25, 2019, and concluded on December 30, 2020.

== Premise ==
Transformers: Galaxies is set parallelly to the events of the 2019 Transformers series, with several characters being affected by the incoming war between Autobots and Decepticons.

== Publication history ==
=== Background ===
Transformers was first announced by IDW Publishing on December 18, 2018. The title is written by Brian Ruckley, and was initially illustrated by Angel Hernandez and Cachét Whitman, and started publishing issues twice-monthly in March 2019. Ruckley described the writing opportunity as a "privilege", and stated that the title would be a great opportunity for new readers to familiarize themselves with the universe and characters of the Transformers franchise, which he describes as of the "biggest [and] best that science fiction has to offer".

=== Development ===
Transformers: Galaxies was firstly announced in June 2019, with the first story arc based on the Constructicons, and is set to be written by Vox Media co-founder Tyler Bleszinski, with art by Livio Ramondelli, and is set to be released in September 2019.

Bleszinski says he has "dreamed of the day that I could somehow be involved in the Transformers universe. Humanizing the Constructicons in a refreshed origin story with Livio Ramondelli – one of the most talented Transformers artists ever – will be one of the highlights of my life and will give me the opportunity to share my passion for these incredible creations with my kids’ generation. This is truly a dream come true." According to IDW Editor David Mariotte, "Transformers: Galaxies delves into what's happening away from Cybertron. Tyler and Livio are working on a story about broken promises and lost futures — about those who fall by the wayside to maintain a utopia."

During San Diego Comic-Con on July 18, 2019, IDW announced three other story arcs: the second arc starring Cliffjumper, the third arc starring Arcee and Greenlight, and the fourth and final arc starring Ultra Magnus.

The series ended on December 30, 2020 after twelve issues.

== Issues ==
Issue	Title	Written by	Drawn by	Colored by	Publication date
#1	"Constructicons Rising! (Part One)"	Tyler Bleszinski	Livio Ramondelli	Livio Ramondelli	September 25, 2019
After the War of the Threefold Spark ended, Termagax recruited the Constructicons (Scrapper, Bonecrusher, Scavenger, Mixmaster, Hook, and Long Haul) to rebuild the damaged cities, despite Wheeljack insisting on demolishing those buildings permanently. Over time, the Constructicons found the Enigma of Combination on Rivets Field, allowing them to combine themselves into a "Combiner", but at the cost of initially losing control. Termagax asks Scrapper and the others to focus on their inner wishes, so they can have control on themselves during the Combination. Time later, the Constructicons continue their duties on the planet Mayalx, while worrying about how other people are afraid of them. Meanwhile, Bombshell secretly watches them, as he has a hidden agenda for them.
#2	"Constructicons Rising! (Part Two)"	Tyler Bleszinski	Livio Ramondelli	Livio Ramondelli	October 30, 2019
While the Constructicons try to focus on training in an attempt to control their Combination, Bombshell (who is working for the Rise) takes advantage to tell them about his origin: Bombshell and his Insecticon partners were forged with an unstoppable appetite for raw materials, so they were sent to metabolize Energon for Cybertron. They were promised to be celebrated and rewarded, but when the War happened, the Insecticons consumed dead Transformers, causing the current Senate to become afraid of them. So the Senate sent the Insecticons to a remote colony, without any promise of returning to Cybertron. Bombshell also insists to the Constructicons that they were sent away for that same reason, and he promises them freedom.
#3	"Constructicons Rising! (Part Three)"	Tyler Bleszinski	Livio Ramondelli	Livio Ramondelli	November 27, 2019
A long time ago, the Constructicons helped the Senate build most of Cybertron's buildings, despite being sceptical at the start. Despite losing control of their Combination several times, they earned the Senate's trust. Following the War, Nominus Prime orders them to search for new Energon reserves on the planet Mayalx, at the cost of leaving Cybertron.
#4	"Constructicons Rising! (Part Four)"	Tyler Bleszinski	Livio Ramondelli	Livio Ramondelli	February 19, 2020
The Constructicons are disappointed about how Cybertron abandoned them out of fear and combine into "Devastator" by using unstable Energon supplied by the Insecticons. Devastator destroys Nominus Prime's statue and kill several security guards. The Insecticons take advantage of the victims' corpses. Several cycles later, the Constructicons collected Energon from Cybertron and delivered it to the Rise, and Shockwave left them on another location, in hopes to recruit them in the future. The Constructicons now feel the same fear the Cybertronians had against them, but also admit they are now free.
#5	"Wannabee, Part One"	Cohen Edenfield and Kate Leth	Alex Milne	Josh Perez	March 4, 2020
On planet Probat, Deathsaurus has made his routine as the planet's Ambassador to collect Energon for the Senate. One day, he needs Cliffjumper to temporarily substitute Bumblebee as part of a meeting with Natalus, the Probats' foreman. As Bumblebee helped the Probats to install an Energon refinery in the past, those people literally worship him. Therefore, when Cliffjumper arrives, the Probats mistake him as Bumblebee, which reminds him of all his previous misunderstandings because of his similar appearance. However, Cliffjumper learns that the Probats have evolve after being exposed to Energon, and have been using their own organic waste to harvesting new Energon supplies; therefore, only Deathsaurus uses the refinery to provide Energon crystals. At the same time, Deathsaurus finds out Natalus was hiding other Energon cubes in case of a disaster and kills him as punishment. When Cliffjumper arrives, he tells Deathsaurus about the hyper-refined Energon, but gets shocked by the latter's motives to kill the Probats in order to create more Energon for himself. Following this revelation, Deathsaurus threats Cliffjumper to help him.
#6	"Wannabee, Part Two"	Cohen Edenfield and Kate Leth	Alex Milne	David Garcia Cruz	March 25, 2020
When Cliffjumper threatens to report the Senate about his actions, Deathsaurus pile-drives him straight through a wall until leaving him unconscious. Deathsaurus takes the advantage to publicly expose Cliffjumper's identity and frame him for Natalus' murder. After escaping a misguided mob of Probats, Cliffjumper meets a young Probat girl who tells him what happened in the past: when Cybertron colonized Probat, the natives were forced to strip their wings away. She then believes Cliffjumper is innocent and helps him find Deathsaurus, who plans to burn down the Probats' several homespires and steal their Energon crystals, so when the city gets rebuilt, he will repeat the same action for every mega-cycle. During their fight, the Probat girl grabs a chunk of the crystal and jams it into Cliffjumper's dashboard, enabling him to become energized enough to incapacitate Deathsaurus into a coma state. Back on Cybertron, Cliffjumper lies to Prowl and Chromia about the planet's Energon resources being dried up, so that nobody returns. Meanwhile, the Probats celebrate their freedom of flying, and present a new statue that honors Cliffjumper.
#7	"Gauging the Truth, Part One"	Sam Maggs	Bethany McGuire-Smith	Josh Burcham	July 8, 2020
Gauge is a Curate of the Reversionists, led by their Planery, Heretech. She is also considered the youngest of all Cybertronians, and learned all instructions of chore and devotion that were given. The Reversionists left Cybertron through the Exodus after a new war started. (Note: As depicted in Transformers #12.) However, Gauge has recently discovered a mysterious code with a hidden message inside the ship, which leads her to suspect of Heretech's motives. Gauge then decide to search for the restricted engine room, where she finds Arcee and Greenlight, the ones responsible for sending her that message.
#8	"Gauging the Truth, Part Two: A Truth for a Truth"	Sam Maggs	Bethany McGuire-Smith and Umi Miyao	Josh Burcham	August 12, 2020
Arcee and Greenlight used a psychic patch on Gauge to restore her memories. She remembers being the youngest Cybertronian under the care of Arcee and Greenlight, but after they arrived at the Exodus, the Reversionists captured her and altered her memory to maker her one of their own. Arcee and Greenlight warn Gauge that Plenary Heretech is planning something. Gauge gets in the mainframe for find information and frees Arcee and Greenlight while escaping from Accelerator's guards. They soon heard Heretech's announcement: he is planning to kill every Transformer on Cybertron so the Reversionists can take over the planet.
#9	"Gauging the Truth, Part Three: Moment of Truth"	Sam Maggs	Bethany McGuire-Smith	Josh Burcham	August 26, 2020
As Heretech plans on using a plasma cannon to change Cybertron's geological state, Gauge takes the chance to use a local communications outpost to deliver a message to both Cybertronians and Reversionists about Heretech's plans. When he tries to attack Arcee and Greenlight, Gauge digs up a mass of raw energon crystals, and uses them against Heretech, incapacitating him permanently. While some Reversionists repair the Exodus with Accelerator as their new Plenary, Gauge and some others decide to stay on Cybetron.
#10	"Storm Horizon, Part One"	Brandon M. Easton	Andrew Griffith	Thomas Deer	September 16, 2020
Ultra Magnus is one of the Four Great Generals during the War Against the Threefold Spark. Recently, he received an encrypted message from Alpha Trion, who has gone missing in the Decimus Sector. Abroad on the Iacon and with the help of Lieutenant Chromedrome, they intercept a hostile ship over the planet Kworia. While searching on a few hills, Magnus' crew find a hidden message: Trion was searching for ancient Cybertronian artifacts that were left behind after the Age of Expansion. Magnus then explores the planet alone, when he finds some Kworians led by Spinister, a Cybertronian who was exiled eons ago. To Magnus' shock, Spinister has already attacked the Iacon to make him an offer: Spinister too wants to find Trion, who is trapped in the Black Spehere, a solar system surrounded by a massive black hole. Magnus reluctantly accepts after Spinister threatens to kill his crew members.
#11	"Storm Horizon, Part Two"	Brandon M. Easton	Andrew Griffith	Josh Burcham	October 28, 2020
While entering the Black Sphere System, the Iacon crew detect a signal from the planet Obsidar. In hopes to search for Alpha Trion, Ultra Magnus enters the planet solo, and after confronting several Obsidians, investigates the other spaceship, the Krm'zik from Kaon, piloted by Octane, a dealer who smuggled body parts after the Tether fell. (Note: As depicted in Transformers #17.) Magnus learns that Trion made a deal with Spinister's boss, Soundblaster: in exchange for Energon, Soundblaster will help Trion to search for a lost Cybertronian repository vessel. Magnus then receives a hologram transmission from Trion and Soundblaster, who are on another spaceship, and under attack by a large fleet.
#12	"Storm Horizon, Part Three"	Brandon M. Easton	Andrew Griffith	Josh Burcham	December 30, 2020
Ultra Magnus has a fight with Soundblaster but succeeds in saving Alpha Trion and escape from the Black Sphere System. However, Chromedome reveals they were absent for seventy cycles. On their way back to Cybetron, the Iacon crew received the message of Megatron after the Tether fell, leading Magnus to reconsider his own cause, but Trion reveals he was finding secret codes in the ancient artifacts he looked for in order to redeem Cybertron. Meanwhile, Soundblaster returned to Cybertron sixty-six cycles earlier, having collected enough raw materials for Shockwave in order to ensure the Decepticons' future.

== Reception ==
Issue	Publication date	Critic rating	Critic reviews	Ref.
#1	September 25, 2019	7.4/10	7	
#2	October 30, 2019	5.6/10	3	
#3	November 27, 2019	6.6/10	4	
#4	February 19, 2020	8.1/10	3	
#5	March 4, 2020	8.3/10	4	
#6	March 25, 2020	8.3/10	3	
#7	July 8, 2020	7.6/10	6	
#8	August 12, 2020	7.5/10	3	
#9	August 26, 2020	9.0/10	1	
#10	September 16, 2020	7.4/10	5	
#11	October 28, 2020	7.3/10	3	
#12	December 30, 2020	7.7/10	3	
Overall		7.2/10	48	

== Collected editions ==
Title	Volume	Material collected	Pages	Publication date	ISBN
Transformers, Volume Two: The Change in Your Nature	2	Transformers #13−18; Transformers: Galaxies #1−6	280	September 15, 2020	1684056756, 978-1684056750
Transformers, Volume Three: All Fall Down	3	Transformers #19−24; Transformers: Galaxies #7−12	280	February 2, 2021	1684057396, 978-1684057399
