= Brian Ruckley =

Scottish writer (born 20th century)

- Born: 20th century Edinburgh, Scotland, U.K.
- Education: University of Edinburgh; University of Stirling
- Occupations: Comics writer, novelist, short story writer
- Writing career
- Genre: Fantasy
- Website: brianruckley.com thewildepisode.substack.com

Brian Ruckley is a Scottish fantasy novelist, comic book writer and podcast creator. He is the author of The Godless World trilogy: Winterbirth, Bloodheir, and Fall of Thanes. He would go on to become principal writer of the 2019 Transformers: Generation 1 comic book series for IDW Publishing, following the conclusion of the previous continuity. His podcast, "The Wild Episode," has profiled over 100 creatures.

== Biography ==
Brian Ruckley was born and raised in Edinburgh, Scotland, and studied at the University of Edinburgh and the University of Stirling. He lived for a time in London but is now based in Edinburgh again.

Ruckley is the author of eight published works.

Four are short stories; "Farm Animal" was printed in 1993 in the British science-fiction magazine, Interzone No. 74, and "Gibbons" was printed in 1999 in issue No. 20 of the magazine The Third Alternative, now called Black Static. "Beyond the Reach of His Gods" appeared in the 2009 anthology Rage of the Behemoth from Rogue Blades Entertainment, and was reprinted in 2012 in the online science-fiction and fantasy magazine Lightspeed. "Flint" appeared in the 2010 anthology Speculative Horizons from Subterranean Press.

His first novel, Winterbirth, was published in 2006 by Orbit Books in both the United States and the United Kingdom. Winterbirth was followed by its sequel, Bloodheir, which was released in 2008, also published by Orbit Books, as was the third novel, Fall of Thanes, released in 2009.

In 2011, Ruckley's fourth book, a standalone historical fantasy and horror novel, The Edinburgh Dead was published, again by Orbit Books.

In 2014, Ruckley released a standalone epic fantasy novel entitled The Free.

Between 2019 and 2022, Ruckley was the main writer for the ongoing Transformers comic by IDW Publishing.

== Bibliography ==
=== Novels ===
- The Godless World series:
  - Winterbirth (2006)
  - Bloodheir (2008)
  - Fall of Thanes (2009)
- Standalone:
  - The Edinburgh Dead (2011)
  - The Free (2014)

=== Comics ===
- Transformers (#1–43, 2019–2022; for IDW Publishing)
  - Transformers Annual 2021 (one-shot, 2021)
  - Transformers: Fate of Cybertron (one-shot, 2022)
- Transformers: Escape (#1–5, 2020–2021)
- Transformers: War's End (#1–4, 2022)

== See also ==
- List of comics creators
- List of fantasy writers
- List of people from Edinburgh
- List of Scottish writers
- List of short-story writers
- List of University of Edinburgh people
