= Alex Milne (artist) =

Canadian comic book artist

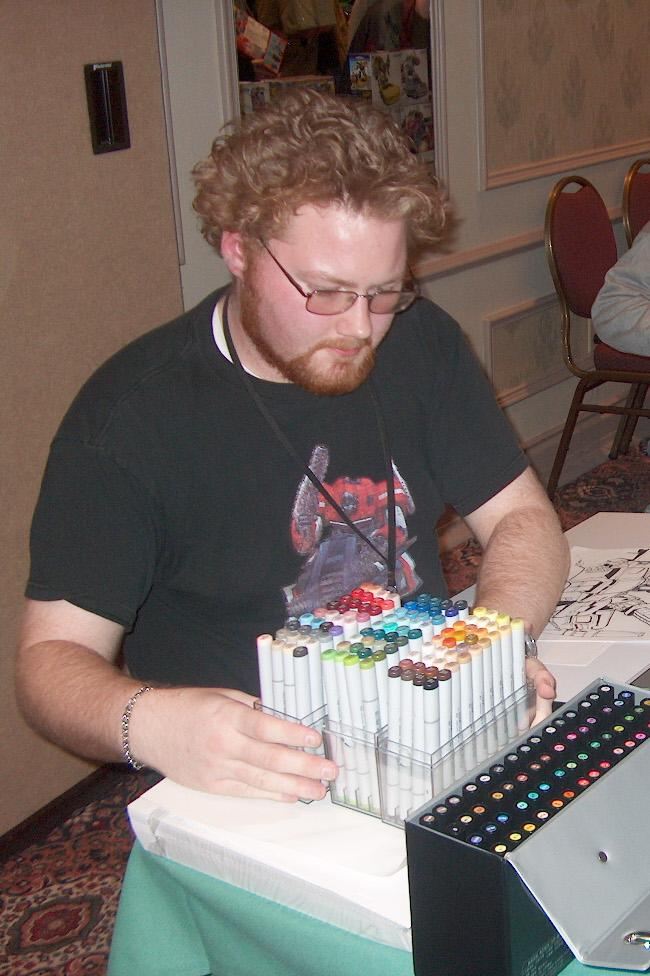
- Alex Milne at the 2006 TransformersCon
- Born: Canada
- Areas: Penciller, Inker
- Pseudonym: MarkerGuru
- Notable works: Transformers; G.I. Joe vs the Transformers

Alex Milne is a Canadian comic book artist, best known for his work on various Transformers comic books.

== Career ==
Graduating from Sheridan College, Milne debuted on the comics scene after being hired by Dreamwave Productions to pencil their Transformers: Energon series. He would also work on Transformers Armada: More Than Meets the Eye, and the box art for the Alternators Jazz and Grimlock during his time there. After the collapse of Dreamwave, Milne was hired by UDON to work on Devil's Due Publishing's third G.I. Joe vs the Transformers comic. After its completion, Milne was hired by IDW Publishing to pencil and ink the official adaptation of the 2007 Transformers movie, released in June, 2007, a month before the release of the movie. Other major projects have included IDW's The Transformers: Megatron Origin and The Transformers: Spotlight issue on Arcee as well as Transformers: Timelines for Fun Publications and the TFcon Toronto 2007 "Alternated Masterpiece" and 2009 "Universe Divided" lithographs. He also created the box art for the 2008 and 2009 BotCon exclusives as well as the 2009 Botcon Transformers 25th Anniversary Lithograph. Milne also drew the 2007 Botcon comic Games of Decepticon, and drew the cover for the 2009 Wings of Honor comic. Milne was the principal artist on the Transformers Movie sequel comic: Transformers: The Reign of Starscream. He has worked on the Transformers: Revenge of the Fallen, Transformers: Revenge of the Fallen Movie Prequel: Alliance, covers for Transformers: Revenge of the Fallen Movie Prequel: Defiance, and the third issue of the comic adaptation for the Revenge of the Fallen movie adaptation.

Milne served as the primary artist alongside writer James Roberts for IDW Publishing's The Transformers: More Than Meets the Eye comic, which ran for 57 issues from January 2012 to September 2016.

== Controversy ==
Comic Book Resources disclosed that much of the work credited to Dreamwave founder Pat Lee was in fact drawn by Milne, who received only a fragment of Lee's payment for work on Cyber Force. When Top Cow discovered this, Lee stopped paying Milne entirely. Milne later confirmed this in an interview.
