= Transformers: Lost Light =

Comic book

- Cover of the Volume 1 trade paperback (October 25, 2017). Art by Jack Lawrence, colors by Joana Lafuente.

Publication information
- Publisher: IDW Publishing
- Schedule: Monthly
- Format: Ongoing series
- Genre: Action
- Publication date: December 2016 – November 2018
- No. of issues: 25

Creative team
- Written by: James Roberts
- Artist(s): Jack Lawrence; Priscilla Tramontano; Alex Milne; Sara Pitre-Durocher; Brendan Cahill; E. J. Su
- Letterer: Tom B. Long
- Colorist: Joana Lafuente
- Editor(s): Carlos Guzman; David Mariotte

Collected editions
- Volume 1: ISBN 978-1631409929
- Volume 2: ISBN 978-1684051489
- Volume 3: ISBN 978-1684053315
- Volume 4: ISBN 978-1684054107

Transformers: Lost Light is an American science fiction / action-adventure comic book written by James Roberts and published by IDW Publishing, taking place in their Transformers universe. Lost Light acts as a sequel to The Transformers: More than Meets the Eye which was published from 2012 to 2016, also written by Roberts. Following the "Revolution" event which integrated numerous of Hasbro's franchises into the Hasbro Comic Book Universe, including Transformers, More than Meets the Eye ended with #57 and was continued with Lost Light from December 2016 to November 2018.

The story focuses on Rodimus and his crew attempting to find the Knights of Cybertron. After having been stranded on Necroworld by Getaway, the crew of the Lost Light attempt to return to Cybertron to gain access to another ship, only to realize that they've been transported into an alternate universe.

The comic book series has received a positive response from critics as did More than Meets the Eye.

The comic continues the LGBT themes from More Than Meets the Eye by featuring transgender female Transformers Anode and Lug who are also a same-sex couple.

== Plot ==
=== Volume 1: Dissolution ===
No.	Title	Release date	ISBN
01	Dissolution Part 1: Some Other Cybertron	December 14, 2016	—
Artist: Jack Lawrence; Cybertronian archaeologists Anode and Lug awaken on the Necroworld five hundred years after being saved from certain death by the Necrobot. Ultra Magnus brings them and the rest of the Disappeared up to speed on what they have missed; as the Lost Lighters mingle with the Disappeared, the Decepticon Fangry targets Tailgate and Cyclonus, Drift gives Rodimus a new paint job symbolizing both grief over Skids' death and a desire for vengeance against Getaway, and Brainstorm teleports Nightbeat and Rung back to the planet's surface. Brainstorm repairs the Necrobot's teleporter as Rung grieves Skids, while Anode accidentally causes Drift to experience a terrifying vision of Pharma, leading an army of Sparkeaters and Worldsweepers, facing him, Rodimus, and Grimlock in battle. Rodimus, Minimus Ambus, Chromedome, Rewind, Drift, Ratchet, Megatron, Terminus, and Roller teleport back to Cybertron, only to find themselves on Functionist Cybertron instead!
02	Dissolution Part 2: Anomie	February 1, 2017	—
Artist: Jack Lawrence; As Rodimus' team realizes that they have been transported into the alternate universe created during their time-travel adventure, they are arrested by the Functionist Council and rescued by the Anti-Vocationist League, an underground resistance against Functionism. Under the impression that Fangry attacked Cyclonus, Tailgate brutally beats him and accidentally impales Anode, only stopping when he burns through his Energon reserves and collapses. As Disappeared medic Kaput repairs Anode, Velocity storms in and attempts to arrest her." Back on Functionist Cybertron, the AVL's rescue is less than impressive, so Megatron takes charge of the situation and everyone escapes, at which point the Council announces that the Day of Revelation has begun; Functionist Council member Six-of-Twelve issues a planetary broadcast informing the group that today is the day will the world will finally learn what "the Useless One" does – in other words, Rung's function.
03	Dissolution Part 3: A World Misplaced	February 22, 2017	—
Artist: Alex Milne; Deep underneath the Necrobot's fortress, Swerve, Ten, and Whirl open an oversized stasis pod, its occupant revealed to be the giant Decepticon Killmaster, Whirl's archnemesis. Nightbeat and Brainstorm make contact with Rodimus' team and discover that the Necroworld was also shunted into the Functionist Universe as a result of the Galactic Council's geobomb. Killmaster seemingly vaporizes Ten with his wand, and a badly damaged Cyclonus appears to help and accidentally gets Swerve zapped. Anode admits to Nautica that she and Velocity once studied together on Caminus; while Velocity became a doctor, she worked as a blacksmith forging new Transformers and stole a batch of the precious birthing metal sentio metallico for an unknown reason. Rodimus' team meets with the AVL's leader, former Functionist Council member Nine-of-Twelve, who brings them up to speed on the history of the Functionist Universe. Rung's alternate mode is strangely revealed to be a massive mining tank, but everyone's skepticism is interrupted by the arrival of Luna 2 in Functionist Cybertron's orbit.
04	Dissolution Part 4: Bad Moon Rising	March 29, 2017	—
Artist: Jack Lawrence; Megatron and the AVL form a plan to rescue Functionist Rung, whose fake alternate mode is meant to drill through the wall of ununtrium surrounding Functionist Cybertron's version of the supercomputer Vector Sigma. Functionist Luna 2 has been converted into a massive doomsday weapon meant to kill those refugees opposed to Functionism and recycle their parts. As Rodimus and Megatron argue over the best course of action, eventually splitting into two teams to rescue Rung and evacuate the refugees, Cyclonus and Whirl manage to take Killmaster's wand and zap him away; Whirl forces Cyclonus to admit that Tailgate has been brutalizing him, albeit unconsciously while he recharges. As Rodimus' team frees Rung and Megatron oversees the evacuation, Anode explains to Lug that she left Caminus and lied to her out of shame, as her overconfidence in her blacksmithing abilities killed a newborn Transformer. Meanwhile, Tailgate awakens to find Whirl looming over him, prepared to tell a love story that does not have a happy ending...
05	Dissolution Part 5: Modes of Production	May 10, 2017	—
Artist: Jack Lawrence; On the Necroworld, Rung confesses to Nightbeat that he has finally remembered what his alternate mode does, while Functionist Rung helps Rodimus' group escape the Functionist Council. Megatron and Roller discuss whether the Functionist Orion Pax is still alive; Terminus advises Megatron to stay in the Functionist Universe and continue leading the AVL as Functionist Luna 2 begins destroying the AVL's headquarters. Brainstorm successfully resummons Swerve and Ten from the pocket dimension linked to Killmaster's wand, only to discover that it is located in their original universe, providing a way home. Rung and Functionist Rung concurrently reveal that their alternate mode manufactures photonic crystals, the storage units for artificial sparks used in cold construction; the Functionist Council's ultimate plan is to create a constructed cold army using Rung's crystals, sparks from Vector Sigma, and materials from Luna 2's harvests, and wage a universal war to wipe out all other life incompatible with Functionism. As Anode realizes that she has been hallucinating Lug, who died before the Necrobot could save her, Brainstorm tells Rodimus that he has figured out how to get them back to their universe.
06	Dissolution Part 6: This Machine Kills Fascists	June 7, 2017	—
Artist: Jack Lawrence; As Rodimus struggles to decide whether to return to their universe or continue helping the AVL, Terminus and Megatron accidentally shoot their ship down. Functionist Rung uses the Council's modifications to enlarge himself to colossal size and attacks Luna 2 directly, while Roller figures out how to return everyone home and save Functionist Cybertron; Terminus decides to stay behind, and Rodimus, suspicious that Megatron will stay behind as well to evade justice, reluctantly allows him a few minutes to say goodbye. Back on the Necroworld, Anode reels from the revelation that Lug had died five hundred years prior but suddenly realizes how to save her; using the sentio metallico she stole from Caminus and the Necrobot's spark-flower containing Lug's spark, she manages to bring Lug back to life with Velocity and Kaput's help. As Functionist Rung is gunned down, the Autobots are able to use Killmaster's wand to teleport Functionist Luna 2 and the Necroworld back into the regular universe, but Megatron is accidentally left behind. As everyone reunites and resolves to track down the mutinous Lost Light, Megatron assumes leadership of the AVL and makes contact with Functionist Orion Pax.

=== Volume 2: Troja Major and The Mutineers' Trilogy ===
No.	Title	Release date	ISBN
07	After Megatron (A Dissolution Epilogue)	June 28, 2017	—
Artists: Jack Lawrence, John Wycough, and Joana Laufente; One week after escaping the Functionist Universe, Team Rodimus converts the body of the dead Decepticon Skip into a larger shuttle to find the Lost Light and seek help, while the rest of the Disappeared remain on the Necroworld to await pickup. As Minimus Ambus, frazzled after Megatron's departure, finds himself unable to operate the Magnus Armor, Tailgate decides to stay on the Necroworld, coldly telling Cyclonus he no longer believes they have a future together. Rodimus tricks Magnus into acting like his old self again by lying about Megatron's moral character, still angry himself over the former Decepticon's apparent decision to stay in the Functionist Universe. Whirl comforts Cyclonus as Team Rodimus leaves, while Kaput informs Tailgate of a procedure to drain all the excess energy from his spark, returning him to normal; Tailgate agrees despite the fact that the procedure requires him to be buried underground in a box for six months. However, Fangry, still bitter over the beating he received at Tailgate's hands, kills Kaput and resets Tailgate's timer for six million years.
08	An Axe to Break the Ice	July 26, 2017	—
Artist: Priscilla Tramontaro; Team Rodimus drops Nautica, Velocity, Lug, and Anode off at the markets of Troja Major to look for another map to Cyberutopia. As Velocity explains Troja Major's history to Lug, the group splits up; Nautica and Velocity go to meet with the former's old contact Agonizer, while Anode and Lug pursue a strange scent through the marketplace. They discover that the scent, similar to sentio metallico, belongs to a strange young robot who transforms into a coffin; Anode and Lug watch as the coffin robot is killed before them, but they are saved by their old blacksmith friend Wipe-Out. Wipe-Out informs the two that their mutual former employer, known as the Grand Architect, is killing blacksmiths, and a squad of the Architect's enforcers led by former Autobot Flame surrounds them at gunpoint. Agonizer informs Nautica and Velocity that he has neither a map to Cyberutopia nor an artifact called the Resus Cradle that Nautica seeks but points them in the Cradle's direction on the other side of town. The two meet with the Cradle's owner, a Catharsian merchant named Mengel, and Nautica requests to use its power and bring Skids back to life, his brain hidden in her eye socket.
09	Chasing the Infinite	September 13, 2017	—
Artist: Priscilla Tramontaro; Unable to afford Mengel's price to revive Skids, Nautica agrees to sell both her grief over Skids and her friendship with Velocity despite the latter's protestations. Anode, Lug, and Wipe-Out escape Flame's troops, who decide not to pursue them in favor of securing "the Infinite," the coffin-bot shot dead earlier. Mengel elaborates that the emotions constituting Nautica's grief and friendship will be extracted; her memories of Skids and Velocity will remain, but they will no longer hold any emotional resonance or importance to her. As Nautica begins the extraction process, Mengel is cornered by Flame for the Resus Cradle while Anode, Lug, and Wipe-Out make a shocking discovery regarding the Infinite; its sentio metallico indicates it can transform into any possible alternate mode. Velocity summons the three blacksmiths to Mengel's lab as she is cornered by the Architect's soldiers, but Nautica saves them, having decided that her friendship with Velocity was worth more than Skids' life. As Velocity realizes that Mengel's machine removed all feelings Nautica had for Skids, Flame presents the Resus Cradle, in actuality the all-knowing Magnificence, to his superior Scorponok.
10	The Plotters’ Club (Part 1): Full Circle	October 18, 2017	—
Artist: Jack Lawrence; Mirage and the Protectobots – First Aid, Blades, Hot Spot, Streetwise, Groove, and Rook – crash their crippled shuttle inside the Lost Light, only to be held at gunpoint by the ship's security team. Getaway warmly welcomes First Aid back to the ship while dodging questions as to how he became captain, the conspicuous absences of Rodimus, Megatron, and their close companions, and why Thunderclash is once again comatose in the medbay. As the crew gathers to socialize in Mirage's old cocktail lounge "Visages," the suspicious Protectobots are told the truth by Riptide: Getaway staged a mutiny and removed Megatron and his supporters from the ship, polling the crew and erasing the conversation's memory from those who said they would stand with Rodimus and Megatron with his nudge gun. Discovering canisters of brain modules pocked with teeth marks stored in Swerve's old bar, the Protectobots and Mirage escape the ship only to be shot down and pulled back, unaware that their minds are trapped within an infinitely repeating memory loop.
11	The Plotters’ Club (Part 2): Filling in the Blanks	November 29, 2017	—
Artist: Jack Lawrence; Getaway speaks with Froid about how his tenure as captain of the Lost Light has been going: after securing most of the crew's help in the upcoming mutiny, Getaway and his chief co-conspirator Atomizer were arrested for manipulating Tailgate, but those loyal to Getaway freed the two once Team Rodimus leaves for the Necroworld. However, the crew was unaware of Getaway's plot to hand Megatron over to the Galactic Council, leading Getaway to distract them with the Warren: a collection of space-time tunnels he learned about from Tyrest that they can use to quickly find Cyberutopia. The Lost Light soon receives the last wishes of Team Rodimus, and Getaway wants Froid and Sunder to mnemosurgically remove those incriminating memories before the crew turns on him. Sunder's price of twenty-five dead crew members is steep, but Getaway decides to acquiesce; Riptide is unaffected by the nudge gun and tells the Protectobots the truth, and Getaway traps the team in their own memory loop and sacrifices Riptide to the horde of ravenous scraplets in the ship's oil reservoir, using his nudge gun to make him forget how to transform.
12	The Plotters’ Club (Part 3): Journey’s End	December 27, 2017	—
Artist: Jack Lawrence; Getaway and Atomizer assume Riptide is dead and depart the oil reservoir, only for Riptide to emerge and escape, once again unaffected by the nudge gun. Getaway, Atomizer, and Froid find the time window in Swerve's bar and witness Team Rodimus enjoying themselves over drinks, and Atomizer kills the unconscious Rook under Getaway's orders. Riptide awakens the Protectobots and Thunderclash from their memory loops, and First Aid deduces that Riptide's low intelligence makes him immune to the nudge gun's effects. Joined by Mirage, the group stops by the morgue to pick up Ambulon's dead body and the Protectobots burst into the shuttle bay as Defensor, with Ambulon's corpse standing in for Rook. However, Getaway has just hired Star Saber as the Lost Light’s new security chief, who kills Mirage and cleaves Defensor into his component Protectobot pieces. Atomizer allows First Aid and Riptide enough time to drag Thunderclash onto Star Saber's ship and escape; Getaway kills him and gets into another argument with Sunder and Froid over editing the crew's memories again, but Blaster interrupts them to report that, at last, they have reached Cyberutopia. Meanwhile, the Galactic Council and the Black Block Consortia battle over the planet Frayus, with the Scavengers and troops led by Deathsaurus and Nickel caught in the middle. The Scavengers escape through a portal provided by a mysterious employer, and Nickel is accidentally thrown through the portal as well.

=== Volume 3: The Scavengers and The Everlasting Voices ===
No.	Title	Release date	ISBN
13	Sardines	January 24, 2018	—
Artist: Alex Milne; Fortress Maximus and his team (Red Alert, Cerebros, Outrigger, and Beak) track the last wishes of the Lost Light’s crew to the Necroworld, finding that the Disappeared Decepticons have taken over. As Red Alert plays with the Necrobot's discarded cloak, the others discover Tailgate's isolation chamber and are shocked when it appears he has spontaneously combusted. Meanwhile, tensions are running high among Team Rodimus inside Skip; Swerve and Anode recruit Velocity and Whirl for a prank war, Roller gets mad at Chromedome and Rewind for enjoying some "alone time" inside his alternate mode, Ultra Magnus and Cyclonus attempt to connect but fail, and Ratchet suddenly begins to lose color as if he were dead. Cyclonus does not take the news of Tailgate's supposed death well and accidentally slices Rewind with his sword, while Ratchet begins to dematerialize, Anode triumphs over Swerve in the prank war, and Skip's shuttle mode begins to shrink. As the chaos reaches a fever pitch, Ten suddenly begins speaking in full sentences and announces that he has a plan to save everyone.
14	The Ties That Bind	February 7, 2018	—
Artists: Sara Pitre-Durocher and Brendan Cahill; In the past, the Decepticon Justice Division confronts Shockwave and his crew of Decepticons as they escape the Overlord-controlled Garrus 9; Shockwave attempts to trade the lives of the crew for his own, but calls in backup to drive the DJD away as Scorponok, Flame, and Flywheels abandon ship. In the present, the Scavengers and Nickel find themselves summoned to Troja Major by Agonizer, who hires them to retrieve the Magnificence. The group agrees as Agonizer tells Nickel about the artifact's history, including his theory that it is one of the Knights of Cybertron who relinquished his body in his pursuit of knowledge. The Scavengers are teleported to the planet Confluence and discover a parked Worldsweeper, where they are attacked by an army of transforming robotic trees and Scorponok; Grimlock is somehow subdued by a wave of Scorponok's hand, and the group is captured. Aboard Scorponok's Worldsweeper, the giant Decepticon reveals that Grimlock once carried the Magnificence inside his chest and Scorponok mentally broke the Dinobot in order to retrieve the artifact. Grimlock awakens and rips the Scavengers to pieces, after which he demands to see Scorponok in full control of his faculties again.
15	Kill All ’Cons	February 28, 2018	—
Artists: Brendan Cahill and Sara Pitre-Durocher; Grimlock is shackled and brought before Scorponok and Flame, seemingly unrepentant over killing the Scavengers, distracting them long enough for the still-alive Decepticons to surround them. Krok reveals that Nickel diagnosed Grimlock with non-fluent aphasia and had Spinster restore his mind while in dinosaur mode, and carefully disassembled the rest of the Scavengers to make it look like Grimlock tore through them. When Fulcrum asks the Magnificence about Scorponok's plans, Scorponok takes over the explanation and reveals an organic baby tattooed with a Decepticon insignia inside his chest; this "Firstborn" is the first of a new line of organic Decepticons, and Scorponok means to revive the fading Decepticon race through procreation, offering the Scavengers a place at his side. They decline as one, tired of fighting, and Nickel uses a paralytic voicemail from Tarn to buy them enough time to escape with the Magnificence and the Firstborn. The Scavengers decide to travel to Garrus-9 to extract the Decepticon spark from the Firstborn but realize that organics cannot use transmat teleportation; Grimlock simply pushes them through the portal and places the Firstborn in his chest, resolving to find another way back to them as the Scavengers find themselves locked in Grimlock's old cell on Garrus-9. In the past, Flywheels joins the Scavengers while Scorponok and Flame are brought into the Grand Architect's service.
16	The Everlasting Voices (1): Metastasis	March 14, 2018	—
Artist: Jack Lawrence; As one, Team Rodimus awake in an unfamiliar landscape to find several strange things happening; Ten can speak, glyphs reciting the ancient Cybertronian creation story litter the walls, and a gigantic Matrix of Leadership hovers above the planet's surface. Ten's spark is absorbed by the Matrix after he properly speaks to and thanks Rodimus, and Swerve and Cyclonus realize what has happened; they are in the Afterspark, a transitional point between life and death, having died when Skip's shuttle mode gave out. Staunch atheist Ratchet is skeptical, but the ghosts of dead bots appear to them and confirm that they are waiting to accept their fate and fully ascend to the afterlife, as Ten had: Trailcutter, Pipes, Roller's old friend Springarm, and Tailgate, with whom Cyclonus happily reunites. Whirl goads Rodimus into challenging the Afterspark's overseeing gods for an audience, who is promptly summoned before the all-powerful Guiding Hand, the first five Cybertronians: Primus, Solomus, Adaptus, Epistemus, and Mortilus.
17	The Everlasting Voices (2): The God War	April 25, 2018	—
Artist: Jack Lawrence; As the other members of Team Rodimus are visited by friends and loved ones long gone, Rodimus calls Ratchet, Drift, and Ultra Magnus to his side to help him plead his case to the Guiding Hand (inadvertently ruining Magnus' chance to ascend). Drift recites the story of the God War when Mortilus supposedly waged civil war on prehistoric Cybertron to bring death to their undying forms. The Guiding Hand's physical forms were destroyed, but they reconciled with Mortilus to create the Afterspark despite his crimes, reminding Magnus uncomfortably of his friendship with Megatron; Rodimus' request to resurrect his team is denied. The four are brought back to the main Afterspark area, where Ratchet begins to see words and symbols that Rodimus and Drift cannot, eventually discovering a group of alien telepaths connected to a canister of green light. Meanwhile, Nightbeat ascends and dies after finally deducing Rung's true purpose, and the ghosts of Quark and Skids appear to beckon their lost loves Brainstorm and Nautica away. Nautica, who no longer feels anything for Skids, continues exploring and discovers the Scavengers locked in one of the facility's rooms.
18	The Everlasting Voices (3): You Are Here	June 13, 2018	—
Artist: Jack Lawrence; The tense standoff between Nautica and the Scavengers is defused when Krok realizes they are seeing two different things. The illusions of the Afterspark and Garrus-9, respectively, disappear, leaving them with a strange medical ward-like environment. Rodimus, Ratchet, Drift, and Magnus are attacked by an army of golems that once safeguarded the Magnificence; as a suspicious Whirl warns Magnus that everyone else is about to die, Ratchet destroys the tank of green light and deactivates the illusion. The group realizes that they are still alive and on the ancient medical center Mederi, the telepaths having powered a custom euthanasia clinic based on the victim's greatest wish – in their case, Cyclonus' desire to see Tailgate again. However, Nautica and the Scavengers arrive having found Circle of Light members among the bodies in Mederi's morgue; Rodimus realizes that their map to Cyberutopia matches the course from Cybertron to Mederi...and that Mederi is Cyberutopia! To prove it, Rodimus finds archival footage of the sickened Knights of Cybertron arriving on Mederi, their desire to return home having transformed Mederi into their own personal utopia of a perfect Cybertron. Cyclonus finally tells Tailgate he loves him as the other ghosts disappear, but the little bot does not, having been alive all long. However, the question of how that is possible is interrupted when Team Rodimus and the Scavengers are attacked by the mutinous crew of the Lost Light, transformed into Sparkeaters!

=== Volume 4: Crucible ===
No.	Title	Release date	ISBN
19	Crucible (Part 1): A Dance Before Dying	July 4, 2018	—
Artist: E.J. Su; Team Rodimus and the Scavengers retreat from the transformed Lost Lighters as Grimlock suddenly drops from the sky and begins ripping the monsters to shreds. Grimlock reunites with the Scavengers as they are joined by First Aid, Thunderclash, and Riptide, who picked up Grimlock while searching for Rodimus. The Lost Light, now adorned with the gear-like sigil of the Grand Architect, retreats into the clouds, Getaway having joined the Architect's forces alongside his old captor Chief Justice Tyrest and sacrificed the crew to save himself. Most of Rodimus' group barricades themselves inside Mederi's main lab while Crankcase flies Rodimus, Magnus, Thunderclash, Roller, Grimlock, Cyclonus, Whirl, Drift, Anode, and Lug up to the Lost Light. Inside the docking bay, the doors suddenly shut as the ceiling above them explodes; only Rodimus and Cyclonus escape as the rest of the team finds themselves drenched by the oil reservoir infested with scraplets, which combine into a monstrous form to devour them. Rodimus and Cyclonus make for the ship's bridge to find Getaway flanked by Star Saber and Scorponok.
20	Crucible (Part 2): Lūstrāre	July 11, 2018	—
Artist: Casey Coller; Rung takes an interest in Mederi's alien telepaths as the others devise a cure for the transformed Lost Lighters. Star Saber pursues Cyclonus through the ship's hallways while Scorponok pummels Rodimus across the bridge but is teleported away by the Grand Architect before he can deliver a killing blow. Rodimus chases after Getaway as the scraplets unexpectedly spare Whirl and Cyclonus slices Star Saber in half. The Mederi telepaths begin counting down from one thousand as Rodimus and Getaway duel in the ship's engine room; Getaway reveals that "Cyberutopia" appeared empty to them since the Mederi telepaths could not derive a clear picture from the crew's different visions of Cyberutopia. The Grand Architect's Worldsweeper fleet attacked, and Getaway allowed Scorponok to transform the others into Sparkeaters to save himself and ensure Team Rodimus' demise. Cyclonus arrives and severs Getaway's arm, but Rodimus saves him to prove how different he is, losing his paint job from Drift in the process. Getaway reawakens and attempts to stab Rodimus but is suddenly devoured by the scraplets, controlled by Whirl. Whirl explains that he had domesticated a group of scraplets some time prior, which had taken command of the horde and killed Getaway based on his greatest desire – validation from Primus. However, all is not over yet, as the telepaths' countdown reaches zero and the space outside Mederi rips open into a giant wormhole.
21	Crucible (Part 3): Farsickness	July 25, 2018	—
Artist: Jack Lawrence; Rodimus brings the Lost Light down to Mederi's surface and picks up everyone to make a quick escape; however, Crankcase is unable to escape the wormhole's gravitational pull, and both the ship and Mederi are sucked through. On the other side, the Grand Architect's Worldsweeper fleet awaits an unseen enemy as Flame makes some last-minute adjustments to the Architect's body. The Lost Light finds itself in what should be the Benzene Cluster but is instead occupied by five newly manufactured replicas of ancient Cybertron. As the ship sets down to investigate, the Black Block Consortia's forces surround them; the Grand Architect attempts to kill them, but Nautica phonetically speaks the gear sigil aloud, catching his interest. The Architect allows Rodimus to choose a small delegation to speak with him, but an impassioned speech from Rodimus convinces him to invite the whole crew aboard. A furious Scorponok, fed up with being kept in the dark, instructs Froid and Sunder to mnemosurgically invade the Architect's mind and learn his secrets, which fails. While waiting in a cell, the Magnificence forces Rung to transform while Froid and Sunder are imprisoned with them and provide context; the Grand Architect infiltrated the Black Block Consortia with disguised robots and had them clear the Benzene Cluster of life to make room for the five Cybertrons, which together form a God Gun that drills a hole into another universe. Scorponok activates the God Gun while the Architect reaffirms the mysterious enemy's validity, having traveled through time to witness its appearance long ago. As Scorponok realizes that the enemy was in the neighboring universe the whole time, the Architect kills him for his insubordination, revealed to be Pharma! Meanwhile, a fleet of ships fly through the portal, and Rodimus and Magnus receive a transmission from Megatron!
22	Crucible (Part 4): The Return of the King	August 8, 2018	—
Artist: Brendan Cahill; Megatron's ship, the Last Light, flees through the portal as the Grand Architect's mysterious enemy finally emerges: Functionist Cybertron itself, transformed into a massive replica of Primus! Pharma commands his army of Worldsweepers, Infinites, and the Black Block Consortia to attack while Tyrest recharges the God Gun, but is suddenly distracted by the sight of Ratchet inside the cell and demands to see the prisoners. The Last Light blows the cell apart just as Pharma enters; most of the prisoners are sucked into space, leaving only Rodimus, Ratchet, Rung, Whirl, and Nautica behind. Megatron works to save the injured Drift while briefing the crew on the Functionist Council's plans, revealing that "Primus" is still populated by Functionist Cybertron's population, as Ratchet learns that the Architect is someone else who has taken over Pharma's body: Adaptus of the Guiding Hand. Adaptus tells the disbelieving crew that they did indeed find the Guiding Hand on their quest for the Knights of Cybertron, although the other members forgot their identities long ago and took up new ones. Mortilus became Censere the Necrobot, Solomus became Tyrest, Epistemus became the Magnificence, and Primus...became Rung!
23	Crucible (Part 5): The Unremembering	September 5, 2018	—
Artist: Jack Lawrence; To everyone's shock, Rung confirms Adaptus' claims – he was once Primus. The Guiding Hand were not gods, but they were the first five Cybertronians and did indeed fight in a God War – started by Adaptus, not Mortilus; wanting the Cybertronian race to evolve in combat, Adaptus sparked a war with Cybertron's neighbors and wiped the planet's memories of himself and his brothers using Luna 1 when he lost the subsequent civil war. Primus took the brunt of the attack and became the always-forgettable Rung as the Guiding Hand faded into mythology, while Adaptus piloted Luna 1 into the Warren, emerging in the present day to see Functionist Primus and vowing to stop it under the alias of the Grand Architect. Before Adaptus can rally his faltering armies against Functionist Cybertron, Tyrest, furious over having his memories of Solomus taken from him, attacks and kills them both. Rodimus's group reunites with everyone else aboard the Lost Light, where Epistemus instructs Rung to use his true function – creating Matrices of Leadership – to allow Rodimus, Ratchet, and Tailgate to destroy Functionist Primus (which would kill them and all the innocent Functionist Cybertronians). However, the crew instead decides to open twelve Matrices of Leadership over Functionist Cybertron's twelve hot spots, overloading Vector Sigma and destroying the Functionist Council inside. Epistemus, now possessed by the Omega Guardians, flies into a rage and kills Froid, Sunder, and Nine-of-Twelve; the Guardians reveal that they caused Team Rodimus to crash on Mederi and teleported Tailgate to the planet as part of their plan to return to the regular plane of existence and devour it, but Nickel crushes the artifact and silences them. The Lost Light takes off and swings toward Functionist Cybertron as the crew gets ready to save the universe!
24	Crucible (Part 6): A Spark Among Embers	September 26, 2018	—
Artist: Brendan Cahill; The Lost Lighters realize too late that they have made a huge mistake: since Functionist Cybertron is in robot mode, they are unable to access the hot spots. However, salvation comes in the form of Fortress Maximus' team piloting Luna 1, which emerges from the Warren and forces Functionist Cybertron to transform back into planet mode. Meanwhile, Chromedome and Rewind accompany Rung back to his quarters, where the exertion of making twelve Matrices kills him. Since only a "pure of spirit" bot can open a Matrix, the crew selects the best amongst them: Rodimus, Tailgate, Ratchet, Thunderclash, First Aid, Nautica, Lug, Swerve, Roller, Velocity, Riptide, and Ultra Magnus receive a Matrix and head down to their assigned hot spots with backup. As final declarations of love and friendship are made amongst the crew, the Matrix-bearers attempt to open their artifacts...but nothing happens. The crew begins to fall to the Functionist Council's forces, but Rodimus gives an impassioned speech imploring them to trust themselves based on the family they have become and that they are good enough. His words hit home as the Matrices activate, but Rodimus' arm is blown off before he can open his; Megatron attempts to open the Matrix instead, but it refuses to yield despite all the good he has done. Rodimus manages to open the Matrix at the last second, and the Functionist Council is destroyed as Luna 1's population of sparks lights up to reveal one last message from Rung: "don't forget me." In the aftermath, Fortress Maximus reveals that Rodimus gave them instructions to come in the future, having time-traveled through the Warren, and the reality sinks in that the Lost Light’s quest is finally over: so now what?
25	How To Say Goodbye And Mean It: Part 2	November 7, 2018	—
Artist: Jack Lawrence (Note: the events in this issue are originally presented in a non-chronological order; this summary rearranges them for clarity.); Sometime after the Functionist Council's defeat, Prowl arrives on Functionist Cybertron to report that Megatron must stand trial once again and that the Lost Light is being decommissioned. Rodimus convinces Prowl to allow the ship one last day of traveling, and the crew reminisces and parties in Swerve's bar one last time, having already forgotten about Rung, while Rewind records the ship for posterity. Nautica, Brainstorm, and Perceptor inform Rodimus that they may be able to pull one last stunt: recreating the initial quantum duplication of the ship while also shunting the duplicate into another universe to prevent another cancellation, so they can keep adventuring forever. Although the crew agrees, they have no way to know if the idea worked, so they return to Functionist Cybertron and end their farewell tour; the crew splits up as the Lost Light is scrapped and Megatron is taken into custody once again, and although Rodimus lies on the stand and claims Megatron did indeed open the final Matrix, the ex-warlord's fate is left ambiguous between execution and eternal imprisonment. Life moves on for the crew, who pursue a variety of paths and careers; Ratchet and Drift become conjunx endura, Minimus Ambus destroys the Magnus Armor and supervises the harvest of the Luna 1 sparks (unaware that every single Lunarian brought to life looks like Rung), Rewind forgets how to transform but continues to live and love with Chromedome, Swerve franchises his bar and loses all but one location, Nautica writes a memoir, Brainstorm injures himself in a lab accident, Cyclonus and Tailgate move off planet, Whirl returns to his old troublemaking ways and drifts in and out of prison, and Rodimus joins Thunderclash's new crew. Eventually, Ratchet dies peacefully of old age, and the crew reunites at his funeral. Cyclonus offers Whirl a place with him and Tailgate once he is released from prison; Whirl is so moved that he turns down Drift's gift of Ratchet's hands, promised to him long ago, having finally found worth in himself again. Once the other mourners leave, Rodimus and Drift speculate whether the duplication worked; Rodimus believes that they will never know for sure but likes to pretend it did. And many years ago, the Lost Light quantum jumps back to Functionist Cybertron but finds itself in an entirely new region of space: the crew have successfully traveled into a new universe. As everyone celebrates, Rodimus and Megatron set course for an adventure that will never truly end.

== Production and publication ==
Following the "Revolution" event, it was announced that The Transformers: More than Meets the Eye would be ending with issue #57 and be followed by Transformers: Lost Light, which serves as "season three" of the story. As with MTMTE, James Roberts serves as the writer of Transformers: Lost Light, with art by Jack Lawrence.

== Reception ==
=== Commercial performance ===
Transformers: Lost Light #1 debuted at number 176 on Diamond Comic Distributors best-selling comics ranking for December 2016, with 11,342 copies distributed, being the ninth best-selling comic of IDW Publishing in that month.
