= Tactical Knives =

American bimonthly hobby magazine

- Editor: Steven Dick
- Categories: Knives
- Frequency: Bimonthly
- Founded: 1994
- Final issue: September 2014
- Company: Harris Publications
- Country: United States
- Based in: New York City
- Language: English
- Website: www.tacticalknives.com
- ISSN: 1079-865X

Tactical Knives (ISSN 1079-865X) was a knife magazine that was published six times per year by Harris Publications. The magazine had its headquarters in New York City. It directly focused on those who actually carry and use knives as opposed to collectors. Typical articles included reviews about knives intended for hunting, hiking, canoeing, wilderness survival, street defense and military combat among other topics.

Publication ceased in September 2014.
