= Exalted (comics) =

2005–07 title by UDON Entertainment

Publication information
- Publisher: UDON
- Format: Ongoing series
- Genre: Fantasy
- Publication date: June 2005 – June 2007
- No. of issues: 6

Creative team
- Written by: Jim Zubkavich; Gala Ferriere; Carl Bowen
- Artist(s): Noi Sackda; Greg Boychuk; Chris Stevens; Roberto Campus; Christine Choi

Exalted is a comic book title produced by UDON Entertainment Corporation, based on the role-playing game Exalted. UDON published six issues of Exalted between 2005 and 2007.

The series follows a newly exalted Solar named Kidale, and includes in its cast several characters who had previously appeared in other works, such as Demetheus (from Castebook: Dawn) and Faka Kun (from Castebook: Night). The brief storyline covers events from Kidale's Exaltation to his eventual death during a Wyld Hunt; while the story itself stops there, the events of it are occasionally referenced through the pre-chapter comics of the second edition of the RPG by the same name, until Return of the Scarlet Empress.

Issue	Title	Release date	ID
0	Relics	June 1, 2005	1-20000-UDON-0
1	Rebirth	October 1, 2005	1-20000-UDON-1
2	Grave Goods	December 1, 2005	1-20000-UDON-2
3	Bonds	February 1, 2006	1-20000-UDON-3
4	Deals	June 1, 2006	1-20000-UDON-4
5	Hunted	June 1, 2007	1-20000-UDON-5
