= Udon Entertainment =

Canadian comic studio and publisher

Udon Entertainment Corp.
- Founded: 2000
- Founders: Erik Ko (Founder); Matt Moylan (Director of Publishing)
- Country of origin: Canada
- Headquarters location: Richmond Hill, Ontario
- Distribution: Simon & Schuster (book channel)
- Publication types: Books
- Nonfiction topics: Art Books
- Fiction genres: Graphic Novels and Manga
- Official website: Official website

Udon Entertainment Corp. is a Canadian art studio and publisher. The company publishes original and translated comic books, graphic novels, manga and art books related to anime and video games. It was founded in 2000 and is named after udon, a kind of Japanese noodle.

== Overview ==
It was affiliated with Studio XD and Long Vo; in March 2004, Udon announced a partnership to release comics under Devil's Due Publishing. Udon's first offering was the Street Fighter comic book series, launching in September 2003. They would add a Darkstalkers comic series to their line in November 2004. In October 2005, Udon reorganized its operations and became a full-fledged publisher. Erik Ko revealed that the lengthy break in the Summer of 2005 was to recover from a licensing deal with Capcom, which saw Udon doing artwork for Capcom Fighting Evolution. Although Udon appreciated the opportunity to work on the game and to strengthen their ties with the video game maker, it taxed their resources and left them behind schedule on their comics. In October 2005, Udon released Street Fighter II #0, the sequel to their Street Fighter comic; it was followed in early 2006 with the long-awaited launch of Rival Schools. Erik Ko discussed this in an interview with Newsarama that can be read here.

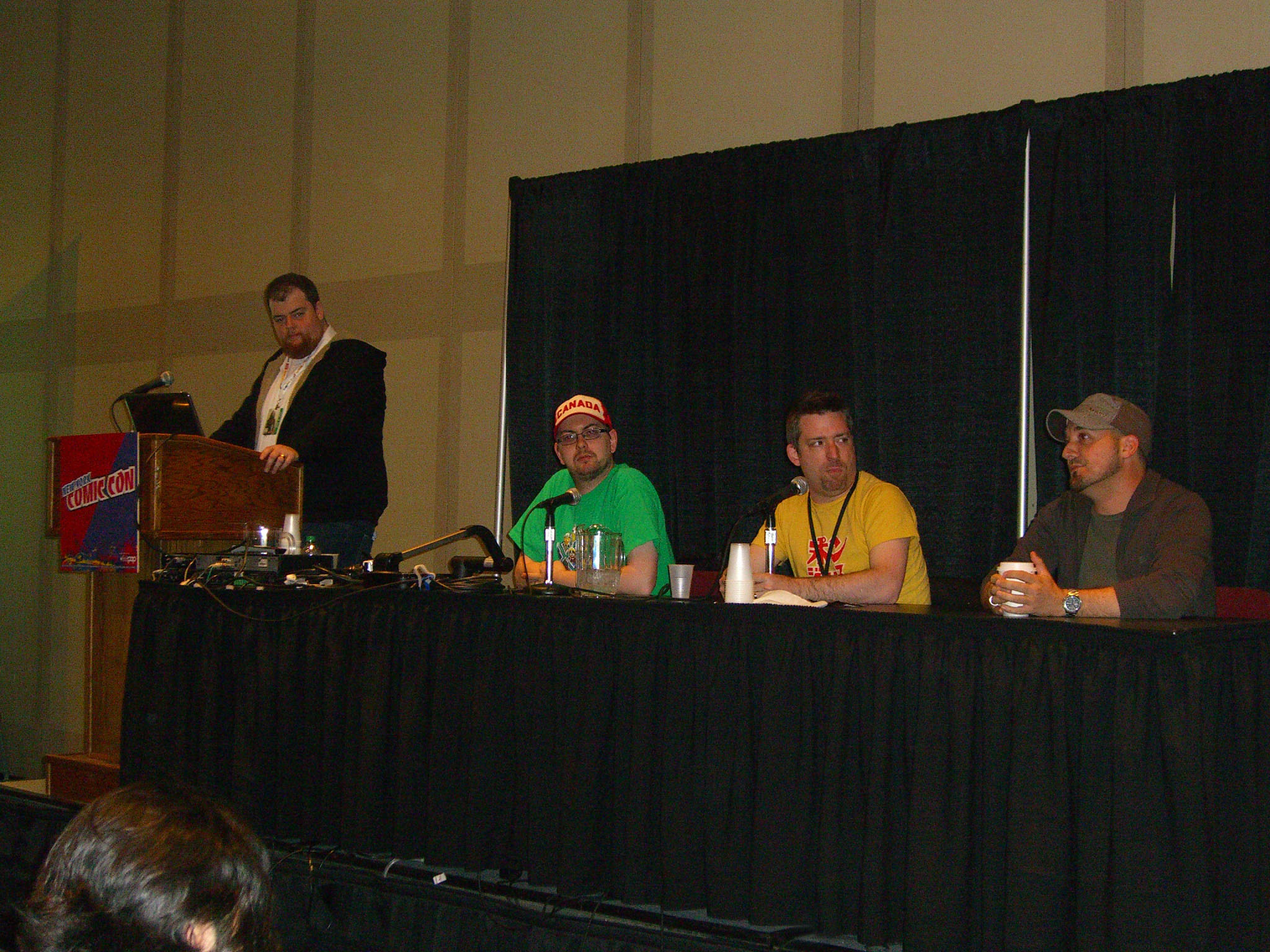
The Udon panel at the 2012 New York Comic Con. From left to right are Udon Director of Marketing Chris Butcher (emceeing at the podium), Managing Editor Matt Moylan, Project Manager Jim Zubkavich and artist Omar Dogan.

In December 2007 at the New York Anime Festival, Udon announced that it would be publishing three new Street Fighter comic book series in 2008. These include Street Fighter II Turbo (12-issue series), Street Fighter Legends: Chun-Li (4-issue mini), and Street Fighter III (6-issue series).

In November 2008, Udon announced it would publish a 4-issue mini-series of the upcoming Street Fighter IV game. "With the most anticipated Street Fighter game in years arriving 2009, we will be launching the "Street Fighter IV" comic series as a big crossover event with the game. That would mean the originally planned Street Fighter III series will have to make way and be released after this "Street Fighter IV" story arc is done," said Ko. "We are working very closely with Capcom and the SFIV producer in Japan to make this comic series as exciting as possible. The stories from our comic are linked directly to the game, and it is a genuine extension that fans will definitely love. Also expect plenty of cross promotion and marketing between our comics and the game."

In January 2009, Udon announced it had acquired the rights to produce Final Fight comic books. In November 2009, Udon announced it will continue the Darkstalkers comic series with a new 3-issue mini-series called Darkstalkers: The Night Warriors. In December 2009, Udon announced it would publish a four-issue Street Fighter Legends: Ibuki miniseries.

From 2012 to 2014, Udon partnered with Bandai Namco to produce several webcomics and webseries based on their various video game IP as part of their ShiftyLook initiative.

In July 2024, during San Diego Comic-Con, Udon and Capcom announced to gain the license to produce new Mega Man comics for 2025. Those comics will include the original series, alongside the X, Zero, ZX and Legends series with the exception of the Battle Network and Star Force series, though the possibility of future comics set in the latter continuity has not yet been ruled out.

== Publishing ==
=== Comic books ===
==== Capcom Universe ====
The Capcom Universe is a comic book franchise developed by Udon, which is based on various Capcom franchises set inside a shared universe.

- Street Fighter #0−14 (2003–2005, originally through Image Comics, then Devil's Due Publishing)
- Street Fighter: Deep Scars (2003)
- Darkstalkers #1−6 (2004−2005, originally through Devil's Due Publishing)
- Capcom Summer Special 2004 (2004)
- Street Fighter II #0−6 (2005–2006)
- Street Fighter Legends: Sakura #1−4 (2006)
- Rival Schools #1−4 (2006, issues #3−4 published online only)
- Street Fighter Remix #0 (2008)
- Street Fighter II Turbo #1−12 (2008–2010)
- Street Fighter Legends: Chun-Li #1−4 (2009)
- Street Fighter IV: Limited Edition Comic (2009)
- Street Fighter IV (2009)
- Street Fighter Legends: Ibuki #1−4 (2010)
- Darkstalkers: The Night Warriors #1−3 (2010)
- Super Street Fighter (2013, 2015)
- Street Fighter Origins: Akuma (2013)
- Street Fighter: Free Comic Book Day 2014 Special #0 (2014)
- Street Fighter V: The Life and Death(s) of Charlie Nash (2015)
- Street Fighter: Free Comic Book Day 2015 Super Combo Special (2015)
- Street Fighter Unlimited (2015−2016)
- Street Fighter Legends: Cammy (2016)
- Street Fighter V: Free Comic Book Day 2016 Special #1 (2016)
- Street Fighter Swimsuit Special 2016 (2016)
- Street Fighter Unlimited Annual #1 (2016)
- Street Fighter & Friends: Swimsuit Special 2017 (2017)
- Street Fighter: Shadaloo Special (2017)
- Street Fighter V: Free Comic Book Day 2017 Wrestling Special #1 (2017)
- Street Fighter vs. Darkstalkers (2017−2018)
- Ultra Street Fighter II: Free Comic Book Day 2018 Special (2018)
- Street Fighter Summer Sports Special 2018 (2018)
- Street Fighter: Menat (2019)
- Street Fighter: Wrestlepalooza (2019)
- Street Fighter: Sakura vs. Karin - Free Comic Book Day (2019)
- Street Fighter: Akuma vs. Hell (2019)
- Street Fighter: Necro & Effie (2019)
- Street Fighter: Pin-up Special (2019)
- Street Fighter #100: Ryu vs. Chun-Li - Free Comic Book Day (2020)
- Street Fighter Swimsuit Special Collection (2020)
- Street Fighter: Swimsuit Special 2020 (2020)
- Street Fighter: Back to School - Free Comic Book Day (2021)
- Street Fighter 2021 Sci-Fi & Fantasy Special (2021)
- Street Fighter V 1: Champions Rising (2021)
- Street Fighter Masters: Blanka - Free Comic Book Day (2022)
- Street Fighter Masters: Chun-Li (2022)
- Street Fighter: Swimsuit Special 2022 (2022)
- Darkstalkers: Morrigan (2022)
- Street Fighter II #1+0 (2022)
- 2022 Street Fighter Swimsuit Special (2022)
- Street Fighter Masters: Chun-Li (2023)
- Street Fighter Masters: Cammy (2023)
- Street Fighter Origins: Sagat (2023)
- Street Fighter Omega (2023)
- Darkstalkers: Hsien-Ko (2023)
- Street Fighter Masters: Akuma vs. Ryu (2024)
- Darkstalkers: Jedah (2024)
- Street Fighter vs. Final Fight (2024)
- Final Fight #1−4 (2024)
- Team Darkstalkers #1−4 (2024)
- Street Fighter Prime #0 (2025)
- Street Fighter vs. Rival Schools (2025)

==== Other comic books ====
- Exalted #0–4 (2005−2006, based on the roleplaying game by White Wolf)
- Cannon Busters #0–2 (2005−2006, creator-owned series by LeSean Thomas)
- Street Fighter 6 #1–4 (2023)
- Mega Man: Timelines (2025)

=== Imported titles ===
- 1520
- Captain Commando
- Chronicles of the Grim Peddler
- Dorothy of Oz (2007-08)
- Dear Waltz
- Daring Students' Association
- Evyione: Ocean Fantasy
- Magical JxR
- Mega Man Mastermix (2018-2019, remastered coloured version of Mega Man Megamix and Mega Man Gigamix))
- Mega Man Megamix
- Mega Man Gigamix
- Mega Man ZX
- More Than a Married Couple, But Not Lovers
- Ninja Baseball Kyuma!
- Onimusha: Dawn of Dreams
- Reading Club
- ROBOT (Japanese anthology/art book)
- The Rose of Versailles
- Silent Möbius Complete
- Star Project Chiro
- Street Fighter Alpha
- Street Fighter: Sakura Ganbaru
- Street Fighter II: The Manga
- Street Fighter III: Ryu Final
- Team Phoenix

=== Art books ===
==== Anime & character art ====
- Daisuke Moriyama Art Works: Chronicle
- Duel Art: Kazuki Takahashi Yu-Gi-Oh Illustrations
- Evangelion Chronicle: Illustrations
- Gurren Lagann Art Works
- Haruhi Suzumiya Illustrations: Spring & Summer
- Haruhi-ism: Noizi Ito Artworks
- Hatsune Miku Graphics: Character Collection CV01 – Hatsune Miku Edition
- Hatsune Miku Graphics: Character Collection CV02 – Kagamine Rin & Len Edition
- Hatsune Miku Graphics: Character Collection CV03 – Megurine Luka Edition
- Hatsune Miku Graphics: Vocaloid Comic & Art Vol. 1
- Hatsune Miku Graphics: Vocaloid Comic & Art Vol. 2
- Mikucolor: KEI's Hatsune Miku Illustration Works
- Ni0 Art Works: Nishi's Alluring Figures
- Osamu Tezuka: Anime & Manga Character Sketchbook
- Osamu Tezuka: Anime Character Illustrations
- Sonicomi Artbook: Super Sonico Picture Album
- Read or Die: R.O.D Official Archive
- Summer Wars: Material Book
- The Essential Evangelion Chronicle: Side A
- The Essential Evangelion Chronicle: Side B
- Robotech Visual Archive: The Macross Saga
- Robotech Visual Archive: The Southern Cross
- Robotech Visual Archive: Genesis Climber MOSPEADA

==== Video games ====
- Ar Tonelico Visual Book
- Asura's Wrath Official Complete Works
- Atelier: Artworks of Arland
- Atelier Series: Official Chronicle^{a}
- Bloodborne: Official Artworks
- Border Break Artworks
- Breath of Fire: Official Complete Works
- Capcom Fighting Tribute
- Dark Souls: Design Works
- Dark Souls II: Design Works
- Dark Souls III: Design Works
- Darkstalkers: Graphic File
- Darkstalkers: Official Complete Works
- Darkstalkers Tribute
- Devil May Cry: 3142 Graphic Arts
- Devil Survivor: Official Material Collection
- DISGAEArt!!! Disgaea Official Illustration Collection
- DmC Devil May Cry: Visual Art
- Dragon's Dogma: Official Design Works
- Elden Ring: Official Art Book Volume I
- Elden Ring: Official Art Book Volume II
- Elden Ring: Official Art Book Volume III
- Fate/Complete Material Vol. 1: Art Material
- Growlanser Art Works
- Hyperdimension Neptunia +mk2 Artworks
- Mega Man Battle Network: Official Complete Works
- Marvel vs. Capcom: Official Complete Works^{a}
- Marvel vs. Capcom: Ultimate Complete Works
- Mega Man Star Force: Official Complete Works
- Mega Man: Official Complete Works^{a}
- Mega Man Tribute
- Mega Man: Robot Master Field Guide
- Mega Man X: Official Complete Works^{a}
- Mega Man Zero: Official Complete Works
- MM25: Mega Man & Mega Man X: Official Complete Works
- Monster Hunter Illustrations
- Monster Hunter Illustrations 2
- Ōkami: Official Complete Works
- Persona 3: Official Design Works
- Persona 4: Official Design Works
- Persona 4 Arena: Official Design Works
- Phantom Breaker: Official Design Works
- Rage of Bahamut: Official Design Works
- Record of Agarest War: Heroines Visual Book
- Record of Agarest War 2: Heroines Visual Book
- Resident Evil 6: Artworks
- Sengoku Basara Samurai Heroes: Official Complete Works
- Senran Kagura: Official Design Works
- SF20: The Art of Street Fighter^{a}
- SF25: The Art of Street Fighter
- Shin Megami Tensei IV: Official Artworks
- Shigenori Soejima Artworks^{a}
- Shining Blade & Ark: Collection of Visual Materials
- Shining Force Feather: Design Works
- Shining Hearts: Collection of Visual Materials
- Shovel Knight: Official Design Works
- SoulCalibur: New Legends of Project Soul
- Street Fighter IV & Super Street Fighter IV: Official Complete Works
- Street Fighter Tribute
- Street Fighter: World Warrior Encyclopedia
- Street Fighter X Tekken: Artworks
- Substrata: Open World Dark Fantasy
- Takehito Harada Art Works 1
- The Art of 5th Cell
- The Art of Brütal Legend
- The Art of Darksiders^{a}
- The Art of Darksiders II^{a}
- The Art of Phoenix Wright: Ace Attorney
- The Art of Phoenix Wright: Ace Attorney - Dual Destinies
- The Art of Resident Evil 5
- The Eyes of Bayonetta
- The History of Sonic the Hedgehog
- The Legend of Heroes: The Characters
- The Legend of Heroes: The Illustrations
- The World of Professor Layton
- Tony's Artworks from Shining World
- Udon's Art of Capcom^{a}
- Udon's Art of Capcom 2^{a}
- Udon's Art of Capcom: Complete Edition
- Valkyria Chronicles: Design Archive
- Valkyria Chronicles 2: World Artworks
- Valkyria Chronicles 3: Complete Artworks
- World of Warcraft Tribute
- Ys: The Art Book

Notes

^aOut of print.

== Work for other companies ==
=== Video games ===
- Full artwork for Super Street Fighter II Turbo HD Remix (Capcom), for Xbox Live Arcade and PlayStation Network
- Character designs and illustrations for New International Track & Field (Konami), for Nintendo DS
- Character designs and illustrations for Speed Racer (WB Games), for Nintendo DS, Wii and PlayStation 2
- Artwork for Capcom Fighting Evolution (Capcom)
- Artwork for Kongai on Kongregate
- Artwork for the pack-in comic included with Namco's Soulcalibur IV Platinum Edition
- Artwork for the pack-in comic included with Capcom's Street Fighter IV Collector's Edition
- Artwork for Tatsunoko vs. Capcom: Ultimate All-Stars (Capcom), for Wii
- Inks and Colours for the pack-in comic included with Midway Games' Mortal Kombat vs. DC Universe Kollector's Edition
- Promotional artwork for the re-release of Marvel vs. Capcom 2: New Age of Heroes on Xbox Live Arcade and PlayStation Network
- Promotional artwork for Marvel vs. Capcom 3: Fate of Two Worlds
- Promotional Comic for Fire Emblem: The Sacred Stones

=== Comics ===
- Agent X (Marvel Comics)
- Marvel Mangaverse: Avengers Assemble (Marvel Comics)
- Cable & Deadpool (Marvel Comics)
- Deadpool (Marvel Comics)
- Sentinel (Marvel Comics)
- Taskmaster (Marvel Comics)
- X-Men: Evolution (Marvel Comics)
- Last Shot (Marvel Comics)
- Vampi (Harris Comics)
- XIN (Harris Comics)
- Robotech (Wildstorm)
- Covers for the StarCraft and Warcraft manga (Tokyopop)

=== Misc ===
- Character designs for DC's Ame-Comi Girls PVC statue line (DC Direct)
- Epic Battles trading card game (Score Entertainment)
- Street Fighter UFS trading card game (Sabertooth Games)
- Darkstalkers UFS trading card game (Sabertooth Games)
