= Xin (comics) =

XIN

Publication information
- Publisher: Anarchy Studio
- Publication date: 2003
- No. of issues: Legend of the Monkey King & Journey of the Monkey King
- Main character: Xin; Sanzen; General II

Creative team
- Created by: Kevin Lau; Jay Faerber; Erik Ko; Omar Dogan; Joe Madureira
- Written by: Kevin Lau
- Artist: Kevin Lau
- Colorist: Omar Dogan

XIN is an American comic book created by Kevin Lau, published by Anarchy Studio in 2003. The main character, Xin, also known as Monkey, was based on the character Sun Wukong, from the shenmo fantasy novel Journey to the West, a Chinese literary classic written in the Ming Dynasty. XIN took many facets of the ancient tale and twists them with a modern sensibility.

== See also ==
- Anarchy Studio
- Journey to the West
- Monkey (TV series)
- Sun Wukong
