= The Transformers: More than Meets the Eye =

Comic series (2012–2016)

- Volume 1 cover

Publication information
- Publisher: IDW Publishing
- Schedule: Monthly
- Format: Ongoing
- Publication date: January 2012 – December 2016
- No. of issues: 57 plus 1 One-shot

Creative team
- Written by: James Roberts
- Penciller(s): Alex Milne; Nick Roche; James Raiz; Guido Guidi; Brendan Caill; Agustin Padilla; Hayato Sakamoto
- Inker(s): Joana Lafuente; Josh Burcham; Josh Perez
- Letterer(s): Shawn Lee; Tom B. Long
- Editor(s): John Barber; Carlos Guzman

Collected editions
- Volume 1: ISBN 978-1613772355
- Volume 2: ISBN 978-1613774984
- Volume 3: ISBN 978-1613775929
- Volume 4: ISBN 978-1613776919
- Volume 5: ISBN 978-1613778029
- Volume 6: ISBN 978-1631401848
- Volume 7: ISBN 978-1631403279
- Volume 8: ISBN 978-1631404528
- Volume 9: ISBN 978-1631406157
- Volume 10: ISBN 978-1631407161

The Transformers: More than Meets the Eye was a serialized comic series that was part of IDW Publishing's The Transformers comic book line. Its title was taken from one of the two taglines of the Transformers franchise, while the other was given to its companion series The Transformers: Robots in Disguise. The series opens after the one-shot Death of Optimus Prime, where the Transformers’ planet of Cybertron faces a period of uneasy peace and political instability. In response, Rodimus Prime recruits a large crew of Autobots to search for the Knights of Cybertron, a group of religious ambassadors who had vanished prior to the events of the comic. The series was written by James Roberts and was primarily drawn by Alex Milne. Issues 1 to 22 were primarily coloured by Josh Burcham while issues 28 to 57 were primarily coloured by Joanna Lafuente.

The series ended at issue #57, to be relaunched as Transformers: Lost Light.

== Plot ==
=== Volume 1: Liars, A to D ===
No.	Title	Release date	ISBN
01	Liars, A to D Part 1: How to Say Goodbye and Mean It	January 11th, 2012	—
Artist: Nick Roche; After the end of the Cybertronian civil war between Autobots and Decepticons, the Autobot leader Rodimus (formerly known as Hot Rod) sends out a message expressing his desire to leave Cybertron and find the mythical Knights of Cybertron using half of the broken Matrix of Leadership, encouraging others to join him. Autobot High Command officers Prowl and Bumblebee, who holds the Matrix's other half, predict a low turnout rate, but over two hundred Transformers join Rodimus' exploration vessel, the Lost Light, the next day. Just before launch, some stragglers pick up the injured Cyclonus, Whirl and Tailgate. The Lost Light takes off but disappears in an explosion, quantum jumping wildly off course; a fifth of the crew is ejected from the ship onto a nearby planet, while Bumblebee and Prowl miss an ominous message that claims to be from the future and warns of dire consequences should the ship take off.
02	Liars A to D, Part 2: Hangers On	February 15th, 2012	—
Artist: Alex Milne; Rodimus and his second-in-command Ultra Magnus lead a team down to the planet to search for the missing crew while scientist Brainstorm discovers that a crewmate phased inside one of the quantum generators during the launch, causing the ship to hurl itself off course. Swerve, Chromedome, and his conjunx endura Rewind (the Transformer equivalent of a significant other) realize that Tailgate was offline for six million years and missed the entire civil war. Another ship appears and crashes, disgorging three giant war robots and an amnesiac Skids, who destroys all of them. Most of the displaced crew are found and the ship resumes its voyage with Skids in tow. However, the ship's security director Red Alert informs Rodimus that a Sparkeater is on board – a predatory beast that eats Cybertronian souls.
03	Liars A to D, Part 3: The Chaos of Warm Things	March 14th, 2012	—
Artist: Alex Milne; Rodimus assembles a team consisting of Rewind, Chromedome, Ratchet, Trailbreaker, Ultra Magnus, and Drift to investigate the Sparkeater while locking the other Autobots in their rooms. Cyclonus is forced to share his room with Tailgate and gives him a summary of the war and the Autobot and Decepticon ideologies. Chromedome is revealed to be a mnemosurgeon, or someone capable of reading and editing Cybertronian memories, and confirms the presence of the Sparkeater after examining the memories of its first victim. Swerve finds himself in a derelict bar and decides to re-open it, while Skids escapes the lockdown and saves Rung, the ship's psychiatrist, from the Sparkeater. Rodimus and Drift realize that the Sparkeater is attracted by powerful sparks and set up a trap using Rung as bait. The Sparkeater is lured into the engine room, where Rodimus phases it into a generator as the Lost Light performs another quantum jump. The crew returns to their respective duties, and Tailgate decides that he wants to be a Decepticon.

=== Volume 2: Delphi and the Scavengers ===
No.	Title	Release date	ISBN
04	Life after the Big Bang	April 18th, 2012	—
Artist: Alex Milne; An Autobot medical facility on Delphi is plagued by a virus which causes Cybertronians to rust and deteriorate at an alarming rate, killing many patients. Swerve reopens the bar without Ultra Magnus' consent, while Ratchet picks up a radio transmission from Delphi and takes Drift and Pipes to investigate the outpost. Rodimus and Rewind show Autobot propaganda to Tailgate, persuading him to join their faction instead. Ratchet’s group arrives on Delphi, and Drift cuts down an infected patient who attacks Pipes. Nurse First Aid takes them to the facility’s ward, introducing them to ward manager Ambulon and facility director Pharma, an old colleague of Ratchet's who is trapped inside a quarantine chamber. Drift realizes Pipes has been infected and knocks him out, only to be infected himself. As Ratchet unlocks the quarantine chamber and releases Pharma, two armed Decepticons storm the ward and are met by the recently-awoken Autobot war hero Fortress Maximus.
05	How Ratchet Got His Hands Back	May 23rd, 2012	—
Artist: Alex Milne; Fortress Maximus violently dispatches the Decepticons as the medics tend to the patients, but Pharma holds Ambulon at gunpoint and accuses him of engineering the virus. First Aid and Ratchet deduce that Pharma was the one responsible after realizing he had avoided transforming, which triggers the virus. Aboard the Lost Light, Rung meets with the paranoid Red Alert, who claims to be hearing noises below the ship that turns out to be an extremely slowed-down voice chanting "kill me." Pharma escapes, and Ratchet intentionally infects himself with the virus, activating its symptoms as he catches up to Pharma. The treacherous medic monologues his scheme to kill his patients and collect their transformation cogs for the Decepticon Justice Division, not realizing that Ratchet infected him with the virus. Panicking, Pharma grabs a vaccine and attempts to flee, but Drift kicks Pharma off the roof while Ratchet retrieves the vaccine. With everyone cured, all of Delphi’s occupants join the Lost Light and Ratchet takes Pharma's hands to replace his own.
06	Interiors	June 27th, 2012	—
Artist: Nick Roche; Fortress Maximus is forced to undergo psychological therapy with Rung, where he repeatedly lies about his traumatic experiences at the hands of the sadistic Decepticon Overlord years earlier on Garrus 9. After a failed session, Maximus snaps and randomly shoots several bots before barricading himself in Rung's office, holding Rung and Whirl hostage. Maximus demands Rodimus return the Lost Light to Cybertron so he can take revenge on Prowl for not sending help to Garrus 9 sooner, while Ratchet realizes that all of Maximus's victims subconsciously reminded him of Overlord. Whirl distracts Maximus while Rodimus orders Swerve and Rewind, working on the ship's hull, to shoot and disable him. However, Swerve misses and accidentally blows Rung's head off, and Whirl impales the distraught Maximus on a pipe, ending the crisis. Meanwhile, Red Alert continues to try and find the source of the voice, discovering a hidden prison cell containing Overlord.
07	Rules of Disengagement	July 25th, 2012	—
Artist: Alex Milne; Black Shadow, an extraordinarily powerful Decepticon turned traitor, is hunted down and murdered by the Decepticon Justice Division, sworn fanatics who uphold the Decepticon code and execute transgressors. Aboard the Lost Light, Ratchet, First Aid, and Ambulon continue to repair Rung, still incapacitated after the hostage crisis; Red Alert sneaks in and leaves proof of Overlord's presence on the ship with the psychiatrist's body before leaving. Meanwhile, on the war-torn ruins of Clemency, Decepticon scavengers Misfire, Krok, Spinister, Crankcase, and Flywheels dismantle fallen soldiers and take whatever may still be useful. They find a survivor, Fulcrum, and a downed Decepticon Worldsweeper warship. The Scavengers explore the Worldsweeper but are interrupted by Tarn, the DJD's leader, who informs the group that one of them is their next target. While the terrified Scavengers argue about the identity of the traitor, Krok finds a stasis pod containing the Dinobot Grimlock.
08	Who’s Afraid of The DJD?	August 22nd, 2012	—
Artist: Alex Milne; As the Decepticon Justice Division approaches the downed Worldsweeper, the Scavengers decide to sic Grimlock on them while they make their escape. On the Lost Light, Skids enlists Chromedome’s help to recover his lost memories, but the latter refuses after looking into his mind. The DJD arrive and reveal that Fulcrum is their target; Grimlock is set free but does little to Tarn and his team. Flywheels is killed in the resulting battle, and Fulcrum, who transforms into a bomb, attempts to sacrifice himself but fails to explode. Believing that Fulcrum is dead, the DJD spares the remaining Scavengers in favor of tracking Overlord. However, Fulcrum survives, and the Scavengers welcome him and the mentally damaged Grimlock into their ranks.

=== Volume 3: Shadowplay ===
No.	Title	Release date	ISBN
-	Annual 2012: Primus: You, Me and Other Revelations	September 12th, 2012	—
Act 1: Signs and Portents; Act 3: Epiphanies; Act 2: Sacraments and Ceremonies
Artists: Jimbo Salgado and Emil Cabaltierra; Act 1: Rodimus and a team of Autobots use Brainstorm’s mass-displacement gun to shrink down inside Ultra Magnus’ body and fight off a horde of microscopic Nanocons. The dour Magnus is forced to smile in order to crush the minuscule creatures in his mouth pistons. Meanwhile, Tailgate is getting ready to partake in an Act of Affiliation to receive his Autobot badge. Rodimus, Drift, and a humiliated Magnus discuss their upcoming arrival on Theophany, home to a sect of pacifist Transformers called the Circle of Light, and the Circle's concerning lack of response. Act 2: During Tailgate's ceremony, Rodimus attempts to draw Tailgate’s badge on his chest but subconsciously scribbles "let me out" in Old Cybertronian. The Lost Light is contacted by Captain K’gard of the Galactic Council, who claims they are trespassing on their territory. K’gard explains that the Circle of Light has disappeared from Theophany and allows Rodimus and a few others to investigate while Magnus is brought onboard K'gard's ship. The group finds the Circle of Light’s Crystal City in ruins; an enraged Drift accidentally collapses the ground beneath their feet, while K'gard offers Magnus a job with the Council. Act 3: Rodimus and his team fall into a cavern concealing a dormant Titan, which the Circle of Light had used to power their city. Chromedome taps into the Titan’s memories and is horrified as he watches the Circle of Light being attacked by the same kind of giant war robots that Skids battled. Rodimus learns that the Titan is still alive and is trying to teleport itself to Cybertron, having actually written "set me free" on Tailgate through Rodimus. Brainstorm uses his mass-displacement gun to shrink the city-bot enough so it can leave. Rodimus' team and Magnus, who declined the job offer, are returned to the Lost Light and set course to the Argon Nebulae to search for the Circle.
09	Shadowplay Part 1: Post Hoc	September 26th, 2012	—
Artist: Alex Milne; In order to assist Rung with his mental recuperation, Rewind gathers Ratchet, Drift, Chromedome, Whirl, Skids, Swerve, and Tailgate together in Swerve’s bar to tell a story. They recall an event before the war, where Chromedome and Prowl were forensics agents investigating the possible murder of a senator by the Decepticons, a rising political movement fueled by social discontent and the writings of a miner named Megatron. Drift, then a young, homeless drug addict, was saved from an overdose by police officer Orion Pax and his medic friend Ratchet, after which it was announced that Cybertron's current leader Nominus Prime had died. Suspecting foul play, Ratchet and Pax met with a sympathetic Senator, who confirmed that Nominus was killed because the Matrix of Leadership within him was fake. Meanwhile, Chromedome and Prowl tracked the murder case to Translucentica Heights where they found another murdered Senator sporting a Decepticon symbol. As they continue to tell the story, Drift leaves to find Rodimus and Grapple pulling Red Alert's decapitated body out of the ship's oil reservoir.
10	Shadowplay Part 2: Patternism	October 31st, 2012	—
Artist: Alex Milne; Rewind's story continues with Chromedome explaining that he and Prowl were ambushed by the second senator's killers; one died in a high-speed chase while the other was killed by the surprise appearance of Orion Pax. Meanwhile, Rodimus and Drift suspect Cyclonus of Red Alert's murder until First Aid concludes that the killer was Red Alert himself. Before returning to Chromedome's perspective, Whirl (then imprisoned for brutally assaulting a young Megatron) revealed to Pax that the Senate was planning a staged bomb attack. While investigating the second senator's killers, Prowl and Chromedome accidentally discovered "The Institute," an underground laboratory secretly run by corrupt Senators that lobotomized and brainwashed its prisoners. Chromedome and Prowl return to Pax, Ratchet, the Senator, and Pax's partner Roller, where Pax pieced the evidence together – the Senate arranged the murders so the Decepticons would be found not guilty, while the bomb attack would be used as "proof" of their true colors and as an excuse to brainwash all those affiliated. The group then realized that the bomb was the fake Matrix of Leadership within Nominus Prime's chest, and Pax concluded that they needed to steal the Matrix.
11	Shadowplay Part 3: An Intimate Beheading	November 21st, 2012	—
Artist: Alex Milne; In the past, the Senator recruited several bots with unique powers to participate in the heist, including Windcharger, Glitch, and Skids. As Chromedome and Roller stayed behind to protect the Senator, Pax's team broke into the Primal Basilica and replaced the Matrix-bomb with a replica. However, corrupt Senate enforcers overran the safehouse while they were away; the Senator surrendered to them to ensure Roller's safety, and Chromedome and Pax find The Institute they discovered deserted. In the present day, Rewind's story concludes, and the naive Tailgate is shocked to discover that Orion Pax became Optimus Prime. Rung is still unresponsive, but Skids awakens him after everyone leaves by mispronouncing his name. Rodimus does not take the news of Red Alert's attempted suicide well and regretfully seals his body in cold storage until the end of the voyage. Finally, it is revealed that the Senator, who underwent the most potent forms of lobotomy and brainwashing at another Institute, was named Shockwave.

=== Volume 4 ===
No.	Title	Release date	ISBN
12	Before & After	December 19th, 2012	—
Artists: Alex Milne ("Before") and Brendan Cahill ("After") (Note: the events in this issue are originally presented in a non-chronological order; this summary rearranges them for clarity.); Before; The Lost Light arrives on Temptoria, a planet in the Argon Nebulae home to a group of Decepticons suspected of kidnapping the Circle of Light. A team of Autobots engages the Decepticons in battle while Tailgate and Rewind infiltrate their stronghold, discovering the native organic Temptorians being converted into Energon. Tailgate, an apparent bomb disposal specialist, attempts to disarm a proximity bomb with Rewind's help but is unable to fully shut it down. Cyclonus arrives just in time to drag Tailgate out of harm’s way; a vengeful Whirl locks him and Rewind inside with the bomb, and Cyclonus shields the little bot with his body as the bomb explodes. After; The Decepticons are defeated, though several Autobots have sustained severe injuries, including Rewind and Cyclonus. Chromedome volunteers for an experimental procedure to jump-start Rewind's damaged spark, while Tailgate hauls the much larger Cyclonus into the medical bay on his own. As the injured pair are operated on, Chromedome tells his history with Rewind to Tailgate, including how he was Rewind's second relationship after the respected intellectual Dominus Ambus, who mysteriously vanished long ago. Chromedome's spark fails to revive Rewind, but a guilty Whirl volunteers for the procedure and saves him. Cyclonus recovers and callously dismisses his relationship with Tailgate, but has second thoughts upon seeing the concern for Rewind and decides to bond with him.
13	Cybertronian Homesick Blues	February 6th, 2013	—
Cybertronian Homesick Blues (main comic); Signal to Noise (additional prose story)
Cybertronian Homesick Blues; Artist: Guido Guidi; The Lost Light touches down on Hedonia for shore leave after battling the Temptonian Decepticons, and Rodimus suggests that Ultra Magnus should relax with the crew. Magnus joins Swerve, Rewind, Rung, Skids, Whirl, Cyclonus, and Tailgate in a bar, but Whirl spikes Magnus' drink out of spite and knocks him unconscious. Later, Magnus stirs and confesses his disdain for his infamy among the crew to Swerve but falls unconscious again. Afterward, the group – now forced to wear human holomatter disguises – turns the still-unconscious Magnus into his alternate mode in order to return to the Lost Light. Meanwhile, Cyclonus confronts Tailgate with the knowledge that he knows the latter has been lying about his past – Tailgate's function was waste disposal, not bomb disposal, and the two bond further over their shared love of ancient Cybertron. Signal to Noise; Artist: N/A; Rung recalls his recovery from his injuries and the trip to Hedonia as he accompanies Ultra Magnus to Rodimus' office. Magnus complains about many things along the way, including Rodimus, losing their lead on the Circle of Light, and his own painful lack of humor. Furthermore, the meeting with Rodimus does not go well; the captain barely pays attention to Rung's psychological reports and does not believe Red Alert's final message about the voice at the bottom of the ship. Afterward, Rung invites Magnus to have a talk with him, musing that it might be nice to have someone listen to him for a change.
14	Remembrance Day	March 6th, 2013	—
Artist: Alex Milne; Inspired by recent events, including Rewind's close brush with death, Chromedome decides to complete the secret mission assigned to him by Prowl – use mnemosurgery to probe the captive Overlord's mind and look for information on how the Decepticons created the nigh-invincible Phase Sixer warriors. Chromedome goes through many key moments and battles in the Decepticon's life, including defeats at Megatron's hand, battling the Wreckers on Garrus 9, and the grueling process that transformed him into a Phase Sixer. However, Overlord's own mnemosurgery skills allow him to usurp Chromedome’s control and discover the passcode to his slow-time cell. Making his escape, Overlord locks Chromedome in the cell and reactivates the time-dilation field, promising to slaughter everyone aboard the Lost Light.
15	Under Cold Blue Stars	March 20th, 2013	—
Artist: Alex Milne; Beginning his rampage, Overlord crushes Pipes underfoot and attacks Ratchet and Drift in the medical bay. Pipes sets off the ship's emergency alarms before dying, giving Rodimus and the crew enough time to ambush Overlord at the medbay. Although mere seconds have passed for Chromedome, he runs out of Overlord’s cell to find that thirty minutes have passed and the Decepticon tearing through the combined forces of the Lost Light. Magnus attempts to hold him off but is stabbed through the spark. Rung frees the vengeful Fortress Maximus from the brig to fight Overlord, who forces the Phase Sixer back into the slow cell. However, one of Drift's swords blocks the cell door from closing; Rewind frees the sword from the inside, and Chromedome has no choice but to jettison the cell and destroy it, Overlord, and Rewind.
16	The Gloaming	April 24th, 2013	—
Artist: Augustin Padilla; Ratchet determines that Ultra Magnus has only ten days to live using a death clock, and a funeral is held for the victims of Overlord’s rampage. Afterward, Chromedome prepares to dispose of Rewind’s belongings and decides to use his mnemosurgery skills to remove his memories of Rewind. Brainstorm attempts to dissuade him from removing the pain, revealing that Chromedome has already done so with previous deceased partners. Brainstorm leaves Chromedome with Rewind's last message, spliced footage from his archives that implores Chromedome to move on without him, ending with him telling Chromedome "I love you." Rodimus publicly banishes Drift from the Lost Light, who had apparently confessed his role in placing Overlord on the ship. Magnus suddenly disappears from the medical bay; while searching for him, Tailgate accidentally scans himself with the death clock and learns he has three days to live.

=== Volume 5: Remain in Light ===
No.	Title	Release date	ISBN
17	Remain in Light 1 of 5: The Fecund Moon	May 29th, 2013	—
Artist: Alex Milne; Ratchet informs Tailgate that he has contracted cybercrosis, an incurable disease brought on by old age, sending the latter into a panic attack. Rodimus and Blaster watch the comatose Ultra Magnus float off the medical slab and into a shuttle through a security feed. The Lost Light pursues Magnus’ shuttle into a wormhole, emerging to find Cybertron's mythical long-lost moon Luna 1. Rodimus leads a team down to Luna 1's surface to search for Magnus, but upon touching down accidentally awakens around a billion unborn Cybertronian sparks across the moon; Brainstorm finds and harvests an extraordinarily rare type of spark called a Point One Percenter. An army of giant war robots, the same kind that previously attacked Skids and the Circle of Light, teleport on the Lost Light and overrun the crew. Meanwhile, Decepticon mercenaries led by Lockdown attack Rodimus' group; Ratchet falls off his speeder and is personally captured by Pharma. Rodimus is later revealed to be imprisoned and telling the story to a fellow prisoner named Ambus.
18	Remain in Light 2 of 5: House of Ambus	June 19th, 2013	—
Artist: Alex Milne; While Pharma takes Ratchet prisoner, all of Rodimus' team are captured by Lockdown's mercenaries except Cyclonus and Whirl. The Autobots are taken to meet neutral Cybertronian lawmaker Chief Justice Tyrest, who reveals that the giant war robots are called Legislators and charges them for "crimes against creation" before throwing them in prison. On the Lost Light, Skids and Swerve tear through the Legislators before being incapacitated by Star Saber. In the cell, the Autobots talk about Tyrest’s backstory while getting to know their fellow prisoner Minimus Ambus, spark-brother to the long-lost Dominus Ambus. Ratchet awakens in Pharma's medbay to find that the mad doctor has removed his head and spark from his body, while Rung suddenly confronts Ambus about numerous familiar characteristics he has been exhibiting in his speech and personality. Ambus confesses that, while Minimus is his true name, everyone would know him better as Ultra Magnus.
19	Remain in Light 3 of 5: The Divided Self	July 31st, 2013	—
Artist: Alex Milne; Ambus explains that "Ultra Magnus" is an identity and a suit of Magnus Armor (cast in the image of the original Magnus) assumed by many bots across the eons to serve as Tyrest's enforcer. He recounts how Tyrest summoned him to Luna 1 via a remote recall in the suit to fire him, the Legislators and Star Saber being his replacements. He also states that the crew has been sentenced to death for harboring Skids, a high-profile criminal. Ambus leaves to confront Tyrest while Skids and Swerve are teleported into the cell by Star Saber. As Cyclonus and Whirl raid the prison's armory and discover the imprisoned Circle of Light, Ratchet mocks Pharma for being too scared to take his hands back; the latter proposes a surgical competition with the hands as the prize. Ambulon and First Aid are brought onto Luna 1, and Pharma bisects the former lengthways for the competition. Star Saber dumps a new prisoner, Getaway, into the Autobots' cell as Tyrest reveals his endgame to Ambus: he plans to exterminate every single Transformer "constructed cold" (where an artificial spark derived from the Matrix of Leadership is placed inside a pre-constructed body) with a universal killswitch, as he believes that they are more pre-disposed to sin than naturally "forged" bots. In doing so, he can be atoned for his sins and be allowed to join the Knights of Cybertron in their Cyberutopia. Ambus realizes Tyrest has gone insane and plans to stop him, but a Legislator sneaks up behind him and crushes his head.
20	Remain in Light 4 of 5: Arm the Lonely	August 28th, 2013	—
Artist: Alex Milne; Cyclonus, Whirl, and the freed Circle of Light battle Star Saber and Tyrest’s endless army of Legislators; during the battle, Star Saber, once a member of the Circle, kills their leader Dai Atlas. Getaway reveals that Skids was once his secret agent partner and the two failed a mission to mentally force Tyrest’s damaged mind to resign. Getaway was captured while Skids escaped in a spaceship formed by Legislator bodies, wiping his own mind in the process. A professional escapologist, Getaway frees Rodimus' group as Ratchet and First Aid escape by converting Ambulon's corpse into a gun, and everyone reunites to storm Tyrest’s control room. Tyrest retaliates by stunning them with a "weapon of mass suggestion," making them believe they cannot move. Tyrest successfully activates the killswitch and walks toward the portal to Cyberutopia as constructed cold Transformers suffer all across the universe, including Getaway, Chromedome, Blaster, Mainframe, Hardhead, Prowl, Starscream, Ravage, Kaon of the DJD, and Krok, Spinster, and Crankcase of the Scavengers.
21	Remain in Light 5 of 5: This Calamitous Life	September 25th, 2013	—
Remain in Light 5 of 5: This Calamitous Life (main comic); The Sound of Breaking Glass (additional prose story)
Remain in Light 5 of 5: This Calamitous Life; Artist: Alex Milne; Tailgate, whose cybercrosis has rendered him deaf to Tyrest's thought weapon, stops him from entering the portal and frees the others. As a still-living and much smaller Minimus Ambus grievously injures Tyrest, Cyclonus duels Star Saber and takes his eye, forcing him to retreat; he also reluctantly decides to make amends with Whirl. Minimus explains that this smaller body is his true appearance, his larger form having been yet another suit, while Skids enters the portal and First Aid kills Pharma. After admitting to Minimus that he brought Overlord onto the Lost Light rather than Drift, Rodimus uses his half of the Matrix to save the victims of Tyrest’s killswitch. Skids encounters a strange glowing orb inside the portal but returns to save Rung as the remaining Legislators storm the control room. As Pharma's headless body is dragged through the portal unnoticed, Tailgate deactivates the Legislators but collapses from the cybercrosis. The next day, Tailgate, only minutes away from death and unable to be cured, is stabbed through the chest by Cyclonus, who uses his sword's mystical properties to reenergize Tailgate's spark with excess energy from his own. As everyone wonders about the remaining mysteries of Luna 1, including its massive planetary engines, strange gear-like insignia, and the Point One Percenter spark that Brainstorm stole, the recovered Magnus formally welcomes Cyclonus aboard the Lost Light. The Sound of Breaking Glass; Artist: N/A; As the crew of the Lost Light comb through Tyrest's technology before leaving Luna 1, Rodimus vows to be a better captain and Fortress Maximus, promoted to Ultra Magnus' old position of Duly Appointed Enforcer of the Tyrest Accord, leaves the ship with a revived Red Alert. Ratchet assists Minimus with putting the Magnus Armor back on, while the Autobots use Tyrest’s equipment to contact Cybertron, only to find that Starscream now rules the planet. Sometime later, Tyrest disappears from his imprisonment on Luna 1.
22	Little Victories	October 9th, 2013	—
Artist: James Raiz; Skids shows the Circle of Light a collage film made by Rewind. Most of the issue focuses on the film, which depicts misadventures aboard the Lost Light; events shown include a quest to discover what Rung’s alternate mode is, encountering the Ammonites and Terradores, another mechanical transforming species embroiled in a perpetual civil war, on Hedonia (where Whirl kills the Terradore leader showing off to the Ammonites), and renowned and popular Autobot Thunderclash visiting the Lost Light. The meeting does not go well; Rodimus is continually jealous of the other captain's popularity, and Thunderclash's second-in-command is revealed to be a villainous Ammonite deep cover agent. Before the Ammonite can steal the Lost Light's quantum engines for his cause, Swerve knocks him out with Rung's alternate mode – a strange, cylindrical device of unknown function, even to Rung himself. The Circle of Light does not like the movie, believing the crew to be insane and dysfunctional, and some resolve to join Thunderclash's crew instead.

=== Dark Cybertron ===
Issues 23-27 of More than Meets the Eye comprise the even-numbered parts of the Dark Cybertron crossover event; the odd-numbered chapters were originally released in IDW Publishing's other ongoing series, Robots in Disguise.

No.	Title	Release date	ISBN
23	Black Metal: Dark Cybertron Chapter 2	November 20, 2013	—
Artists: Atilio Rojo, James Raiz, and Livio Ramondelli; Bumblebee rallies his Autobot forces in response to the undead Necrotitan's appearance, including Ironhide, Arcee, and the Dinobots. As Starscream attempts to prepare Iacon for the Necrotitan's assault, Rodimus and Orion Pax recruit Brainstorm to help them enter the Dead Universe aboard the Lost Light. Pax, Rodimus, and Ultra Magnus meet in Swerve's bar, where they discuss a shared sense of foreboding and recruit Hardhead and Cyclonus to join Pax and Rodimus in the Dead Universe while Magnus and the rest of the crew search for Jhiaxus. Starscream hears the full Dark Cybertron prophecy from the imprisoned Scoop, while Shockwave meets with Nova Prime and Galvatron, trapped inside the Dead Universe. Orion's team enters the Dead Universe, while Soundwave's Decepticons attack Bumblebee's Autobots, announcing that they have a plan.
24	Into the Abyss: Dark Cybertron Chapter 4	December 4, 2013	—
Artists: Atilio Rojo, James Raiz, Nick Roche, Livio Ramondelli, and Robert Gill; The Lost Light is attacked by a strange horde of transforming mechanical beings at the bottom of an alien ocean, while Starscream attempts to take stock of the devastated Iacon despite Scoop and Rattrap's mocking. The crew of the Lost Light identify their attackers as Ammonites and begin fighting them hand-to-hand underwater; in the Dead Universe, Pax's team is dissuaded from touching the sickened Cyclonus by Nightbeat. As the Autobots and Decepticons recover from the Necrotitan's attack, Shockwave forcibly activates the space bridge portal to the Dead Universe within Megatron's chest, and a team of Lost Lighters piloting the Rodpod (a shuttle shaped like Rodimus' head) discovers a badly-damaged Metroplex while fleeing from the Ammonites.
25	No Exit: Dark Cybertron Chapter 6	January 15, 2014	—
Artists: Atilio Rojo, James Raiz, and Livio Ramondelli; The Necrotitan begins moving towards Iacon as the Rodpod explores Metroplex's innards. Although Metroplex is still alive, the team finds that his brain module is missing while searching through an ever-shifting maze of internal parts; the maze leads them back to where they docked the Rodpod, and a lone Ammonite destroys it. Back on Cybertron, more and more bots start blaming Starscream for the devastation as the Necrotitan breaches Iacon's borders, while Pax's Dead Universe team is imprisoned by Nightbeat, controlled by Nova Prime. As Rodimus attempts to free Nightbeat from Nova's mental control, the mad Nova Prime kills Hardhead and reveals that he has also taken Kup captive and converted him into a space bridge.
26	Burning Bright: Dark Cybertron Chapter 8	February 5, 2014	—
Artists: James Raiz, Atilio Rojo, and Livio Ramondelli; As Bumblebee carries the injured Megatron towards Iacon, Prowl and Soundwave combine their forces to treat the wounded, evacuate Iacon, and launch a counterattack on the Necrotitan. Inside Metroplex, Getaway defuses the standoff between the Lost Lighters and female Autobots Windblade, Nautica, and Chromia, who explain that Metroplex teleported to the bottom of the alien ocean to slow the alchemical virus's spread through his body and intentionally moved his brain to his left shoulder. Nightbeat and Pax's team free Kup in the Dead Universe, but Nova finds them and challenges Pax to a fight. Magnus suggests using the Lost Light’s quantum engines to reenergize Metroplex, while the unsuccessful Autobot-Decepticon attack on the Necrotitan is interrupted by Megatron and Bumblebee; as everyone argues over the next course of action, the Lost Light and Metroplex appear in Cybertron's sky.
27	The Becoming: Dark Cybertron Chapter 10	March 12, 2014	—
Artists: Alex Milne, Brendan Cahill, and Livio Ramondelli; The portal out of the Dead Universe closes, leaving Optimus Prime and his team stranded; however, Optimus and Cyclonus can hear singing, suggesting another portal is hidden nearby. Shockwave's plan reaches its final stages, as the combined powers of his Regenesis ores have taken control of time and space, and Jhiaxus uses Galavtron to retroactively drain the Dead Universe's energy. Unaware of this, Autobots and Decepticons celebrate the Necrotitan's defeat together, where new friendships are made and old feuds are revisited; in particular, Megatron begins questioning his approach to the war, while Prowl and Chromedome fight over the former's indirect role in Rewind's death. However, all reveling and infighting ceases as Skywarp, Metalhawk, and Waspinator teleport in to reveal the full, terrifying scope of Shockwave's plans: using the Regenesis ores and the Dead Universe's energy, the cyclopean scientist plans to collapse all of existence into a singular moment to sustain Cybertron for all eternity, and has summoned an army of seventy billion Ammonites to protect him as he ascends to godhood!

=== Volume 6: "Season 2" ===
No.	Title	Release date	ISBN
28	World, Shut Your Mouth Part 1: Towards Peace	April 30th, 2014	—
Artist: Alex Milne; Six months after the Autobots and Decepticons united to stop Shockwave from destroying all of time and space, the Lost Light resumes its quest with Megatron, now an Autobot, assuming co-captaincy of the ship. Flashbacks show that Megatron was placed on trial following Shockwave's defeat for his many crimes against creation; Optimus Prime stands in as Chief Justice, with Ultra Magnus and Prowl acting as the defense and prosecutor, respectively. Rodimus informs Optimus that his half of the Matrix was destroyed fighting Tyrest, and he intends to rendezvous with Thunderclash to continue their quest. In the present, several crew members eavesdrop on Megatron's first counseling session with Rung, who briefly asks him about a bot named "Terminus" in the dedications of his old writings. A depressed Chromedome continues to replay Rewind’s final message but is shocked when the ending changes before his eyes; Rewind now screams violently rather than saying "I love you." Returning to his quarters, Megatron is caught in a tussle with a vengeful Whirl, who loses an arm to the network of space bridge portals in Megatron's innards but fails to rouse his anger. Meanwhile, the Lost Light discovers what appears to be an Autobot coffin floating in space.
29	World, Shut Your Mouth Part 2: Words Hang in the Air	May 14th, 2014	—
Artist: Alex Milne; Tailgate, now fully cured of cybercrosis, enthusiastically wanders about the Lost Light and meets Ten, an intact Legislator who Swerve reprogrammed to act as a bouncer for his bar. Six months prior, Megatron's trial continues, now taking place on Cybertron's second moon Luna 2 at the defendant's request; Starscream takes the stand and delivers a speech painting Megatron as an inept leader unable to control the war, prompting Megatron to change his plea to "not guilty." Meanwhile, Rodimus is given a list of crew members who voted to remove him as captain following his confession regarding Overlord, and is unable to decide whether to destroy it or look at it. Back on the Lost Light, Trailbreaker decides to steal some of Megatron’s fuel only to be caught and rendered permanently sober. Chromedome and Nightbeat investigate the change in Rewind's message, only to discover that part of the Lost Light’s hull has vanished. While struggling with Megatron, Trailbreaker accidentally damages and opens the retrieved coffin, revealing the corpse of another Rodimus.
30	World, Shut Your Mouth Part 3: Predestination: A Beginner's Guide	June 25th, 2014	—
Artist: Alex Milne; As Megatron's trial continues six months prior, Ultra Magnus delivers a statement from Megatron explaining his change of plea; Megatron believes that Autobot High Command is rigging the trial to conform to their version of events, and now wishes to be judged by the Knights of Cybertron. The Terrorcons and Seacons fail to extract Megatron from the trial, and Optimus decides to permit Megatron's request, provided he read a prepared speech renouncing Decepticonism. Meanwhile, Ratchet updates Rodimus on Megatron's new position as co-captain, as well as the fact that the list of crew members was fake, since his name was not present. Back on the Lost Light, Rodimus bickers with Megatron while assembling a team of specialists to examine the corpse of the other Rodimus, who concludes that it must be a future version of the co-captain. However, further discussion on the corpse is tabled as the ship's hull continues to vanish before their eyes. Megatron orders the crew to abandon ship, and the Lost Light fully disappears behind them.
31	Twenty Plus One	July 9th, 2014	—
Artist: Atilio Rojo; Twenty Autobots find themselves in the rebuilt Rodpod after the ship's disappearance: Megatron, Skids, Getaway, Nautica, Chromedome, Swerve, Nightbeat, Tailgate, Cyclonus, Ratchet, Crosscut, Gears, Blaster, Ammo, Huffer, Hoist, Riptide, Dipstick, Hound, and Highbrow. As Nautica learns the history of the Lost Light from Riptide and Hound catches Ravage spying on them, bots start disappearing as the lights flicker. Eventually, only those not present at the ship's original launch remain – Megatron, Nautica, Nightbeat, Skids, Getaway, Riptide, and Ravage, as well as Ratchet's hands (appropriated from Pharma) and Cyclonus' sword (taken from Luna 1). As the group attempts to think of a plan, they come across the destroyed remains of a second Lost Light.
32	slaughterhouse	August 27th, 2014	—
Artist: Alex Milne; Megatron's group boards the second Lost Light and discovers that all of its occupants have been murdered; Megatron is immediately suspected, who agrees to stay behind with Ravage while the others explore the ship. Megatron and Ravage discuss the former's change of faction, and Ravage reveals that Soundwave sent him to spy on Megatron. Nautica and Nightbeat find Brainstorm's open briefcase causing temporal anomalies around them and Overlord's headless corpse inside the slow cell, while Skids, Getaway, and Riptide find a large room of corpses in their alternate modes missing their transformation cogs. Reporting back to Megatron, everyone concludes that the massacre was the work of the Decepticon Justice Division, while Nightbeat realizes that this Lost Light cannot be from the future as previously thought. As the group prepares to leave, Ravage discovers one survivor hiding inside the discarded Magnus Armor – Rewind.
33	slaughterhouse Part 2: The Road Not Taken	September 17th, 2014	—
Artist: Alex Milne; As everyone struggles to reconcile the inconsistencies around them on the second Lost Light, Nautica finally realizes what has happened: this Lost Light is a quantum duplicate, an exact copy of the ship and crew created by the explosion at the original launch. Data from the other Rewind corroborates this theory; in this version of events, the ship remained on course, the other Rodimus was killed during the Sparkeater fiasco, and someone deliberately deactivated the other Overlord's cell and summoned the DJD. Rewind was spared only because he was forced to film the murders and escaped in the chaos, and Riptide notices that the quantum foam from the ship's engines threatens a nearby planet. As Nightbeat discovers a Decepticon insignia on the other Brainstorm's mouthplate (implying that this Brainstorm called the DJD and that their Brainstorm is a Decepticon mole), Megatron and Rewind shut down the engines, cancelling out the duplicate and restoring the original ship and crew. Only the other Rewind and the other Brainstorm's briefcase remain; Ravage decides to stay on the Lost Light, Chromedome and Rewind reunite, and Brainstorm poisons the crew in Swerve's bar.

=== Volume 7: Elegant Chaos ===
No.	Title	Release date	ISBN
34	Births, Deaths, and Interventions	October 29th, 2014	—
Artist: Alex Milne; After the disappearance and reappearance of the Lost Light, Bluestreak, Mainframe, Trailbreaker, and First Aid set down on the nearby planet of Ofsted XVII to await orders from Rodimus. While exploring, they find an injured Cybertronian; First Aid and Trailbreaker decide to help them despite Bluestreak and Mainframe's reservations, not realizing that their patient is Vos of the Decepticon Justice Division. Vos attacks Trailbreaker, who seals himself inside a panic forcefield, unaware that he has also locked Vos' fellow DJD member Kaon in with him. To the other Autobots' horror, Kaon rips Trailbreaker limb from limb, taking his datapad with Megatron's declaration of peace as he and Vos leave. Millions of years ago, Megatron was a lowly miner on Messatine struggling to spread his social writings and take care of his injured roommate Terminus. The Senate's chief psychologist Froid arrives to eliminate Megatron's resistant thoughts through mnemosurgery, but his contemporary Rung arrives to question the procedure's necessity. A strange energy surge forces an evacuation of the mine, and Megatron is separated from Terminus; deep in the deserted mine, Brainstorm materializes, briefcase in hand.
35	The Custom-Made Now - An Elegant Chaos Prologue	November 26th, 2014	—
Artist: Alex Milne; Aboard the Lost Light, everyone recovers from the poisoning at Swerve's bar to discover that Brainstorm has fled into the past, his mysterious briefcase revealed to be the control unit for a time machine. Perceptor explains how Brainstorm's time machine is linked to the ship's quantum engines and can only be used by those with a compatible spark type. Believing that he intends to kill Orion Pax and change the outcome of the war, Rodimus assembles a team to follow him back in time using the quantum-duplicate Brainstorm's briefcase. However, all is not as it appears, as glimpses of another Cybertron are shown in which Functionism (a strict social class system based on alternate mode function) rules society with an iron fist. On this Functionist Cybertron, the alternate Minimus Ambus reunites with Rewind and his lobotomized brother Dominus Ambus and witnesses several "mass recall" exterminations of those declared obsolete, including flight-capable Lunabots, laser pointers, and data slugs, such as Rewind.
36	Elegant Chaos Part 1: All Our Parlous Yesterdays	December 17th, 2014	—
Artist: Alex Milne; Rodimus, Rung, Cyclonus, Tailgate, Whirl, Chromedome, Rewind, and Riptide follow Brainstorm back into Cybertron's past, encountering the young Orion Pax and his team defending a hot spot from Sentinel Prime's Elite Guardsmen. As a cover story, the time travelers state that they are Orion's backup; Trailbreaker is among Orion's team, and Rodimus attempts to discreetly prevent his future death on Ofsted XVII. As the present Megatron speaks with the past Orion, Rewind – whose database has been corrupted with information from the Functionist Universe – realizes that the Senate is trying to mutate the hot spot with radiation and artificially create outliers. The team destroys the Senate's weapon while Roller teleports the sparks to safety and mysteriously disappears. To preserve the timeline's integrity, Chromedome wipes Orion and his team's memory of their encounter, including the knowledge of Roller's disappearance and Trailbreaker's future death.
37	Elegant Chaos Part 2: Stet	February 4th, 2015	—
Artist: Alex Milne; Now back on Brainstorm's trail, the time travelers split up; as Perceptor warns Rodimus that they may not be able to stop Brainstorm's changes to the timestream, Brainstorm spots Rung and realizes he has been followed. The team pursues Brainstorm one year into the past, where the scientist knocks out the past Rung, and the present Rung accidentally causes a bar fight between a young Megatron, Impactor, and a group of drunken cadets. As Perceptor reports that time has stopped in the present and the complete collapse of their timeline is imminent, everyone realizes that Brainstorm's true goal is to erase Megatron from existence.
38	Elegant Chaos Part 3: Predestination: An Expert's Guide	March 4th, 2015	—
Artist: Alex Milne; Perceptor uses the last of the quantum engines' power to send the team back in time again. They find Brainstorm holding Megatron's half-constructed body at gunpoint, but Rung convinces him to stand down; the scientist confesses that his original intention was to steer Megatron away from his warlord future, but Rewind suddenly kills Megatron instead. However, Whirl reveals he stole the Point One Percenter spark that Brainstorm took from Luna 1 and places it inside Megatron's body, restoring the original timeline. Perceptor teleports Rodimus and Cyclonus to the past Lost Light to recharge the time machines with the past quantum engines, accidentally creating both the Sparkeater and their present ship. After everyone returns to the present, Perceptor muses that Functionist Cybertron may now exist in its own parallel universe – which is shown to be the case, as the Functionist Council finally discovers the purpose of their most hated enemy's alternate mode – Rung.

=== Volume 8 ===
No.	Title	Release date	ISBN
39	The Permanent Revolution	April 8th, 2015	—
Artist: Hayato Sakamoto; Eighteen months ago, the Decepticon Justice Division boarded the Autobot exploration ship Lost Light to kill Overlord, only to kill the rest of the crew when they discovered noted Decepticon defector Drift on board. Seventeen months later, they returned to Ofsted XVII to salvage the ship's quantum engines at the request of their newest member, diminutive female medic Nickel. However, they accidentally stumbled into a battle between the Galactic Council and the Black Block Consortia over the engines, losing Vos and Kaon. Now, the two missing Decepticons return to the team with shocking news: Megatron has renounced Decepticonism and become an Autobot! Shattered, Tarn takes a lethal overdose of their secret super-fuel "Nuke," but Nickel's despair at seeing him close to death prompts him to back out and arrange a meeting with former Decepticon warlord Deathsaurus. Although everyone believes that the DJD plans to kill Deathsaurus, Tarn proposes an alliance to kill Megatron and his new Autobot friends. Impressed with Tarn's commitment to his troops and the promise of being removed from the DJD's hit list, Deathsaurus agrees.
40	Our Steps Will Always Rhyme	April 29th, 2015	—
Artist: Brendan Cahill; Aboard the Lost Light, Rodimus, Ultra Magnus, and legal expert Xaaron place Brainstorm on trial in front of a jury of his peers following their time-traveling escapade. The scientist admits that he became a Decepticon double-agent to procure the time machine's materials but never gave out any crucial Autobot secrets; he also refuses to be held accountable for the alternate Brainstorm's actions that killed the alternate crew. The judges conclude that Brainstorm must destroy the other time briefcases and cannot work in his lab without supervision, but allow him to stay on the Lost Light. Ratchet, meanwhile, is planning to leave the ship and shares short but meaningful goodbyes with First Aid, Rodimus, Rung, Skids, Nautica, and Magnus. He also discovers that Ten, Swerve's Legislator bouncer, is an incredibly gifted artist and encourages him to reach out to his favorite crew members despite his limited vocabulary. As life returns to normal across the Lost Light, Ratchet leaves in search of Drift.
41	The Sensuous Frame	May 27th, 2015	—
Artist: Alex Milne; Rodimus gleefully interrupts the daily lives of the crew with a special announcement: his hated rival and extremely popular Autobot hero Thunderclash is near death, and the Lost Light has been invited to a "pre-wake" aboard his ship, the Vis Vitalis. Rodimus and Megatron skip the party, deciding to "plan" together rather than invent individual excuses, while the rest of the crew enjoy themselves. Nautica awkwardly reunites with her catty roommate Firestar from Caminus, while Nightbeat snoops around the Vis Vitalis and finds an unconscious Getaway and a panicked Ravage running from something. Strangely, First Aid, Minimus Ambus, and the ship's medic Velocity cannot find anything wrong with Thunderclash until the Autobot hero starts selectively shutting down his vital systems to spell out a warning. Nightbeat and Getaway pursue Ravage into the ship's morgue, where they find that Getaway is covered in invisible technorganic eggs, and a mass of strange creatures surrounds them.
42	The Frail Gaze	June 24th, 2015	—
Artist: Alex Milne; Ravage rescues Nightbeat and Getaway from the morgue as the Lost Light members still aboard the Vis Vitalis are attacked by the creatures. In a supreme act of heroism, Thunderclash reactivates and transforms to buy First Aid, Velocity, and Minimus enough time to escape, which both excites and terrifies the creatures. As everyone barricades themselves inside the dance room, Nautica reunites with Velocity and realizes that Firestar was lying about her importance on the ship to show off. Furthermore, Nautica discovers that the creatures are personality ticks, parasites that feed on charisma; only Skids, Getaway, and Thunderclash have been targeted for their charm, with the ticks even healing Thunderclash's old war wound to continue feeding on his personality. Suddenly, Rodimus and Megatron appear and kill the ticks with their combined charisma. Afterward, Nautica and Firestar part on good terms, Thunderclash and Velocity join the Lost Light, and Swerve vanishes while supervising a party in his bar.
43	The One Where They Go To Earth	July 29th, 2015	—
Artist: Alex Milne; The Lost Light is pursued by Earth, with the only response from the planet a theme song advertising Swerve's bar. Skids finds Swerve unconscious in his room and close to death, having interacted with the crew through a holomatter avatar for the past few weeks; the crew realizes that Earth (or "Swearth") is also a mental projection from Swerve fueled by his exhaustive love of human pop culture and TV sitcoms. A team led by Rung eventually finds Swerve's scattered subconscious on Swearth, who does not know where he is injured and does not want to leave, having felt unimportant and unwanted for some time. Cyclonus tells Swerve that he is so important to the crew that everyone is searching for him on Swearth, giving him the strength he needs to disperse the holomatter illusion. First Aid leaves the Lost Light after saving Swerve but realizes that the true cause of his injury – an old shoulder wound from the war – is actually a secret message from Agent 113, an Autobot mole within the Decepticon Justice Division.
44	The Not Knowing	September 2nd, 2015	—
Artist: Hayato Sakamoto; Most of the data from Agent 113's message is unreadable, but the crew finds coordinates leading to the Necrobot, a mythical Cybertronian who supposedly guides dying souls to the Afterspark, recording the fates of every single Transformer. Rodimus realizes that he has been subconsciously carving a map to Cyberutopia into his desk but decides to visit the Necrobot's world at Rewind and Megatron's request; Rewind wants closure over the disappearance of Dominus Ambus, and Megatron is content to postpone his final judgment as long as possible. Much to the crew's bemusement (and Nightbeat's intense disappointment), the Necrobot is actually a totally normal, if exceptionally long-lived, Cybertronian named Censere, who does indeed travel the galaxy keeping records of Cybertronian deaths. Every Transformer has their own holographic statue on the Necroworld that is switched off upon their death, blue flowers containing the essence of the dead are planted around the statue of their killer, and Censere maintains a monument to bots who disappeared from the war without a trace. Rewind and Chromedome discover that Dominus Ambus is still listed among the Disappeared, while Megatron wordlessly takes in the sea of flowers surrounding his own statue.

=== Volume 9 ===
No.	Title	Release date	ISBN
45	Some Of My Best Friends Are Autobots	September 30th, 2015	—
Artist: Alex Milne; Ever since discovering that Megatron is an Autobot and Starscream rules Cybertron, the Scavengers have been gallivanting around the galaxy having all sorts of wacky adventures. While en route to meet with their next client, Crankcase accidentally crashes their ship, the Weak Anthropic Principle, on the planet Tebris VII. Krok is displeased to see so many former Decepticons succeeding in life while his team wanders about with no purpose, and Misfire attempts to re-educate the mentally damaged Grimlock with little success. The Scavengers meet with former Decepticon scrap merchant Demus on Tebris VII, who is running a successful business selling robotic animal "Roboid" toys and offers to buy Grimlock for an obscene amount of money; while the Scavengers argue about the proposal, Demus is suddenly killed by Fortress Maximus.
46	Animals	November 4th, 2015	—
Artist: Alex Milne; The Scavengers manage to distract Maximus long enough to escape into Demus' scrapyard. As Maximus hunts them, he reveals that Demus was actually a slave trader, and the Roboids are lobotomized Cybertronians trapped in a beast mode and sold as torture dolls to organic races. Crankcase deliberately allows Maximus' partner Red Alert to intercept a transmission regarding Grimlock, and Maximus abandons the Scavengers to collect his former prisoner. Unable to transform due to Demus' fear of transformation, the Scavengers use horse-shaped Roboids to return to the Weak Anthropic Principle, interrupting the scuffling Grimlock and Maximus. To everyone's surprise, Grimlock manages to say Misfire's name, convincing the Scavengers to keep him; they trick Maximus into believing they placed a bomb in the scrapyard and escape when he leaves to save the Roboids. As Grimlock surprises Misfire again by saying a complete sentence, Maximus contacts Rung to tell him about the Scavengers' strange kindness and how they left him instructions to save the Roboids. Meanwhile, several mysterious bots in the employ of an equally mysterious "Grand Architect" discuss Demus' failure.
47	The Lopsided Triangle	November 25th, 2015	—
Artist: Brendan Cahill; Getaway has been forging an odd relationship with Tailgate over the past few months; a concerned Cyclonus attempts to talk about it with Whirl, only to be laughed away and told that Tailgate is better off with Getaway. However, Whirl has actually been conspiring with Getaway and Atomizer to remove Megatron from the ship, with an oblivious Tailgate being the key to their plan – at Getaway's direction, Tailgate will sneak into Megatron's room with fake mnemosurgery needles, with the assumption that Megatron's intense fear of mnemosurgery will cause him to kill Tailgate and get himself removed from the ship. Now having second thoughts about putting Tailgate's life in danger, Whirl's memory of the plan is erased by Getaway's old nudge gun, but he manages to warn Cyclonus before fully forgetting. Cyclonus barges into Megatron's room just as Tailgate is caught, taking down both Megatron and Ravage before being surrounded by the Lost Light’s security team. Cyclonus is gunned down protecting Tailgate, whose despair causes his spark to erupt with a strange energy.
48	Speak, Memory: Part 1	December 23rd, 2015	—
Artist: Hayato Sakamoto; Skids attempts to recover his missing memories with Rung's help; he remembers being taken to the horrific Decepticon prison Grindcore, meeting his cellmate Quark, and speaking with the prison commandant, but nothing more. Riptide interrupts to tell Rung he has a visitor: Froid, his former psychiatric rival, who Rung assumed was dead after being taken hostage by mnemosurgeon serial killer Sunder and his accomplice and spark-brother Sceptre. As Cyclonus and Tailgate recover from their injuries, Megatron apologizes for lashing out, and Rodimus reveals that Chromedome read the unconscious Tailgate's memories, something neither Megatron nor Cyclonus agrees with, to catch Getaway and Atomizer. Rung and Froid have a tense reunion, and Rung discovers Sunder imprisoned aboard Froid's shuttle. Rung fears that Froid has grown too close to Sunder, but Froid reminds Rung that the same thing happened to him long ago – furthermore, Rung was disbarred from practicing medicine by a ship's tribunal, but the ship was shot down, leaving Rung the only survivor and free to pretend the trial never happened. Froid also divulges that Sunder is capable of remote mnemosurgery via his eyes and feeds on painful memories. When Sunder turns his ability on Skids, his memories rush back to Grindcore, revealing that the prison commandant was Tarn.
49	Speak, Memory! (Part 2)	February 10th, 2016	—
Artist: Hayato Sakamoto; Skids' recollection of Grindcore continues throughout the issue: Tarn offers to release fifty prisoners if Skids fixes the prison's teleport chamber. As a reward, Tarn allows Skids and Quark to leave with the next batch of prisoners, but the two realize too late that the teleport chamber is actually a smelting chamber. Tarn pulls Skids out at the last second and forces him to watch as the prisoners are horrifically melted. In the present, Froid releases Sunder from his cage, and Rung warns Megatron of the incident before fleeing with Skids. Later, Tailgate awakens to find that strange metal balls litter the hallways. Rung, Froid, and Skids arrive and reveal that the balls are crew members who have fallen victim to Sunder's remote mnemosurgery (in which he forces a Cybertronian to transform but makes them forget how to change mid-transformation, turning themselves inside-out). As Sunder finds the group, Chromedome seals off Skids' memories as Thunderclash and Froid are turned inside-out. Sunder flees back to Froid's ship, which is actually the deceased Sceptre, and transforms it into a gigantic battle suit, but is defeated when Rung destroys his eyes and Tailgate inexplicably picks up the Rodpod and crushes him with it. Later on, Rung attempts to resign from the Lost Light, Velocity concludes that Tailgate's spark-spasm evolved him into an outlier with superstrength and invulnerability, and Megatron takes up pacifism.

=== Volume 10: The Dying of the Light ===
No.	Title	Release date	ISBN
50	The Dying of the Light: (1) How Bright Their Frail Deeds	Feb 24th, 2016	—
The Dying of the Light: (1) How Bright Their Frail Deeds (main comic); No Guns, No Swords, No Briefcases (additional comic one-shot)
The Dying of the Light: (1) How Bright Their Frail Deeds; Artist: Alex Milne, Brendan Cahill, and Brian Shearer; All across the galaxy, Cybertronians receive a haunting video from the battered crew of the Lost Light, stating that they have six hours left to live and giving individual funeral instructions. Optimus Prime attempts to rally a rescue, but Jetfire reveals that the message was sent three weeks ago. Three weeks prior, Megatron remotely supervises an Autobot campaign on the planet Miliarum before giving the latest in a series of lectures on the Knights of Cybertron. The students conclude that the strange gear-like sigil seen throughout their quest is a coat-of-arms for a clan within the Knights. However, Megatron, Tailgate, Rewind, Chromedome, Rung, and Swerve experience a personalized psychic attack, which the Lost Light traces back to the Necrobot's planet. Rodimus, Ultra Magnus, the victims, their friends and partners (Ravage, Cyclonus, Ten), the scientific team (Brainstorm, Nightbeat, Nautica, Skids), Velocity, and Whirl all board the Rodpod to investigate; they accidentally teleport inside the hollow Necroworld before being shot down by Decepticon attack craft on the surface. Everyone takes shelter inside the Necrobot's fortress, where they discover Censere's dead body and realize that he corrupted the psychic signal to warn the crew away before he died. Ravage leaves the fortress to investigate their attackers, while Rodimus contacts the Lost Light for pick-up; however, he is shocked when Getaway answers, who reveals the crew staged a mutiny and freed him to be rid of Megatron and his supporters. As Getaway assures Rodimus' team that their attackers only want Megatron, an injured Ravage limps back inside to confirm they are surrounded by the Decepticon Justice Division. No Guns, No Swords, No Briefcases; Artist: Brendan Cahill; Perceptor discovers that Brainstorm's time-case has opened a window into the past in Swerve's bar, allowing the crew to revisit moments and crew members long gone. Skids watches the Duobots investigate the empty bar before launch, Tailgate watches Pipes and Drift discuss him over a drink, Velocity witnesses Swerve making fun of Ambulon's alternate leg mode, Chromedome and Rung watch as Rewind prepares a story for the then-comatose Rung, Perceptor relives Overlord attacking him in the then-temporary medbay, Ten watches his own body be found in the bar's wreckage after Tyrest's defeat, and everyone watches a welcoming party for new crew members with Trailbreaker. The temporal fissure closes, but Perceptor states that it will open again sometime in the future; the present crew raises a toast to the dead, unaware that the ghostly form of Getaway is watching them from the future, paying his own tribute.
51	The Dying of the Light Part 2: The Sun in Flight	Mar 30th, 2016	—
Artist: Alex Milne; The DJD's forces open fire on the Necrobot's fortress but quickly retreat, promising to return at sunset. The Autobots search the fortress for anything useful, finding a quantum teleporter powerful enough to let them escape and a collection of stasis pods containing unknown organics in the basement. Megatron convinces the group to stay and protect the organics, while Ravage and Ten leave the fortress to find the DJD's ship, the Peaceful Tyranny. The DJD's argument with Deathsaurus over their tactics is interrupted when Megatron calls Tarn, asking to meet him alone. As Ravage tricks Ten into distracting the Decepticons while he continues searching for another ship, the other Autobots notice that Ten has found a solution: they can use the energy from the spark-flowers to upgrade the fortress' forcefield. Ten is overwhelmed by the DJD but is unexpectedly saved by Ratchet and Drift.
52	The Dying of the Light Part 3: Your Fierce Tears	Apr 27th, 2016	—
Artist: Alex Milne; Ratchet, Drift, and Ten are quickly pushed back, but Drift takes the DJD's pet turbofox hostage; Ravage returns in Ratchet and Drift's shuttle to save them, but they are shot down despite Kaon's insistence to keep The Pet safe. Meanwhile, Tarn brutally attacks Megatron, who refuses to fight back; just before Tarn can deliver the killing blow, Overlord suddenly reappears and demands that he be the one to kill Megatron. The two Decepticons fight and Overlord reveals that the Galactic Council repaired him; however, Megatron disappears, and Overlord agrees to join Tarn and Deathsaurus' alliance. Ravage's group returns to the fortress where Rodimus reunites with Drift, and Tarn kills Kaon over his concern about The Pet to silence Overlord's mocking. The battered Megatron returns to the fortress, still defiantly clutching his Autobot badge.
53	The Dying of the Light Part 4: At Close of Day	May 25th, 2016	—
Artist: Alex Milne; As Ratchet finishes repairing Megatron, Brainstorm sends Tailgate to demolish parts of the fortress for raw materials while Rewind records the crew's last wishes. Nightbeat and Rung leave to investigate the Necroworld's hollow center, but Nautica calls the two of them, Skids, Velocity, and Brainstorm aside to make them her amica endurae (the Transformer equivalent of best friends). Chromedome volunteers to read The Pet's mind to locate the Peaceful Tyranny, only to discover that it is, in fact, a domesticated Transformer; simultaneously, Rewind speaks with Minimus Ambus and discovers that Dominus Ambus' base alt mode was a turbofox. Chromedome and Rewind both realize the horrifying truth at the same time – Dominus Ambus disappeared because he was Agent 113 and was lobotomized into The Pet upon being discovered. Chromedome attempts to repair Dominus but Rewind severs the connection between them, choosing Chromedome as Dominus dies. Whirl and Cyclonus finish securing the perimeter but realize that the forcefield will not let them fire outwards. As Brainstorm reveals the new and upgraded Maximus Ambus – a colossal suit of Magnus Armor for Minimus – Megatron refuses to stand and fight with the other Autobots. Even so, Rodimus pulls everyone into a final group hug and deactivates the forcefield to begin the battle.
54	The Dying of the Light Part 5: Rage, Rage	June 22nd, 2016	—
Artist: Alex Milne; As the Autobots take the fight to the DJD, Deathsaurus is taken aback by their unprecedented strength, suspecting that something has happened. Indeed, after Rodimus hugged everyone, Velocity had the idea to recreate Tailgate's spark-spasm to give everyone in range superstrength, albeit at the cost of someone's life. Skids volunteers, and Chromedome reluctantly unlocks his memories of Grindcore, causing his spark to erupt as Tailgate's had. Unfortunately, the power-up wears off quickly, and the Autobots are pushed back as Skids dies in Ratchet's arms. Megatron is finally spurred into action when Tarn rips Ravage in half, and singlehandedly turns the tide of the battle while the Autobots retreat into the fortress and Tarn sends the rest of Deathsaurus' troops to their doom. Megatron eventually tires and the DJD surrounds him to deliver the killing blow.
55	The Dying of the Light Part 6: Do Not Go Gentle	July 27th, 2016	—
Artist: Alex Milne; Just as the DJD fires on the defeated Megatron, a forcefield springs up around him; the dying Ravage explains that Megatron had stolen Trailbreaker's personal forcefield generator after his death. Rewind and Swerve use the Necrobot's psychic weapon to guilt Deathsaurus and Nickel into retreating, and Overlord also decides to leave. Tarn, Vos, Helex, and Tesarus break into the forcefield, where Megatron begins pouring antimatter from his eyes. Per Ravage, this has always been Megatron's plan; he had spent the last year working to establish a connection with a black hole using the space bridge portals inside his body and Whirl's lost arm as an anchor point. Megatron kills the remaining members of the DJD but is saved by Rodimus at the last second. Ravage dies in Megatron's arms, urging him to "not change back," as Soundwave collapses in despair across the galaxy. The other Autobots are shocked to discover that the "organics" inside the stasis pods are actually the Disappeared, including Roller and Megatron's old friend Terminus, whom the Necrobot had saved using the last of Brainstorm's time-cases. Meanwhile, Nightbeat and Rung realize that the Necroworld's interior matches Cybertron's exterior, implying that Cybertron itself was molded from the Necroworld. The Galactic Council teleports a geobomb inside the Necroworld, and everything vanishes in a flash of light.

Notes: (Note: The titles of the last five issues are from quotes from the poem "Do not go gentle into that good night" by Dylan Thomas.)

== Reception ==
=== Critical response ===
The series has been noted for its portrayal of Cybertronians in same-sex relationships. It has been met with critical acclaim for its politics and overarching plot, an ending, though stories from issue 39 onward were criticised for jumping the shark by some readers and fans.

It is noted to be one of the most popular IDW titles.

Transformers: More than Meets the Eye won two Comics Alliance awards, namely "Best of 2015: Continued Excellence in Serial Comics" and "Best of 2016: The Best Sci-Fi Comic of 2016".

=== Commercial performance ===
The Transformers: More than Meets the Eye: physical sales per issue (in thousands)

Volume	#	Sales	Diamond ranking
1	1	15,340	121
1	2	11,671	161
