= Guns & Weapons for Law Enforcement =

American firearms magazine

- Volume 19 Issue 6
- Editor: Harry Kane
- Categories: Firearms
- Frequency: Eight-times Annually
- Founded: 2004
- Final issue: 2017
- Company: Harris Publications
- Country: United States
- Language: English
- Website: www.guns-weapons.com
- ISSN: 1058-2975

Guns & Weapons for Law Enforcement was a firearms magazine that was published eight times per year by Harris Publications.
