= Harris Publications =

Former American media company

- Founded: 1977
- Founder: Stanley R. Harris
- Defunct: 2016; 10 years ago
- Successor: Athlon Media Group
- Country of origin: United States
- Headquarters location: New York City
- Publication types: Consumer magazines, comic magazines
- Nonfiction topics: Lifestyle, business, health, guns and weaponry, automotive, decorating, gardening, beauty, sports, outdoor living, entertainment, history

Harris Publications Inc. was an American special interest media company, operating over 75 brands with print, digital, mobile and live-event platforms prior to its sale to Athlon Media in 2016. It produced magazines that educate, entertain and inform. Subject matters spanned an array of interests including decorating, gardening, beauty, automotive, entrepreneurship and small business, sports, outdoor living, history, tactical, entertainment and wellness. Harris' titles covered a variety of markets and focused on niche special interests, primarily in the United States.

Harris Comics (sold in 2010 to Dynamic Forces) published the former Warren Publishing character Vampirella for nearly two decades. Harris sold additional magazine brands including the basketball magazine Slam in 1998, African-American women's lifestyle magazine Honey in 1999, Guitar World in 2003 and XXL in 2014. Athlon Media acquired Harris Publications' magazine brands and websites in 2016 including Harris Farmers Almanac, American Frontiersman, Flea Market Style, Real Gardens and Music Icons.

== History ==
Harris Publications was founded in 1977 by Stanley R. Harris, who had been in the magazine publishing business since the late 1960s. Harris's father William invented the Harris Press printing press.

One of Harris Publications' first successful and long-running titles was Guitar World, which it published beginning in 1980, before selling the property to Future US in 2003. The company sold its music and millennial division including XXL to Townsquare Media in 2014. XXL was one of the largest music sites focusing on hip-hop and urban culture.

On April 28, 2016, Harris Publications operations and its magazine brands and trademarks were acquired by Athlon Media. Athlon integrated many of Harris' brands into its Decorating & Gardening group and announced plans to further distribute Harris' content through its newspaper distribution resources.

=== Harris Comics ===
In 1983, Harris acquired the assets of the defunct Warren Publishing, including their well-known horror magazines Creepy, Eerie, and Vampirella. Forming Harris Comics in 1985, Harris published a single issue of Creepy (#146), but legal murkiness and a 1999 lawsuit by Warren publisher James Warren resulted in his reacquisition of the rights to Creepy and sister publication Eerie.

In the early 1990s Harris Comics revived Vampirella, publishing Vampirella stories in various series and formats from 1991 to 2007. A number of British creators worked for Harris on its Vampirella titles, including Grant Morrison, Gary Frank, Mark Millar, John Smith, Ian Edginton, and Malachy Coney. In January 2007 Fangoria Comics made the announcement that the character Vampirella was now owned by Fangoria, however, in April Harris replied that this was not factual, and began publishing Vampirella Quarterly.

Harris Comics also published a number of non-Vampirella comics in the superhero and science fiction genres. The 2002–2003 imprint Anarchy Studio published manga comics featuring the characters Vampi and Xin. Harris Comics operated until 2008, and in March 2010 Dynamite Entertainment acquired the Vampirella property.

Small Business Magazine, a Harris bi-monthly publication for first time entrepreneurs was launched in 1988 by Susan Rakowski. Two spinoff publications were published and sold worldwide.

== Titles ==
=== Automotive ===
- Mopar Action
- Rides
- America's Best Big Trucks
- 0-60

=== Beauty ===
- Short Hair
- Celebrity Hairstyles
- Short Styles

=== Crafts ===
- Christmas Crochet
- Fresh Quilts
- Room to Create
- White Crochet

=== Comics ===
- Creepy—published one issue of the former Warren Publishing title in 1985
- Cyberfrog (1996)—Ethan Van Sciver character acquired from Hall of Heroes
- Flux (1994–1995)—video games, comics, and music
- Harsh Realm (1994)
- The Rook (1995)—original Eerie character revamped by Harris
- Vampi (2000–2002)
- Vampirella (various titles, 1991–2008)—acquired from Warren Publishing
- Xin (2002–2003)

=== Decorating ===
- Beach Cottages
- Country Collectibles
- Decorating Shortcuts
- Flea Market Style
- Organized Room by Room
- Romantic Country
- Storage Solutions
- Small Space Decorating

=== Dogs ===
- Dog News—considered the bible of the conformation show industry
- D—D is the Annual Magazine of Dog News released to coincide with the Westminster Kennel Club Dog Show

=== Entertainment ===
- Style Makers
- Hollywood Icons
- Music Icons

=== Gardening ===
- Container Gardening
- Fleas Market Gardens
- Great Backyards
- Porches and Gardens
- Real Gardens

=== Music ===
- Guitar World (1980 – 2003) — acquired by Future US
- Revolver (2000–2003) — acquired by Future US
- Scratch (2004–2007)
- XXL (1997 – 2014) - acquired by Townsquare Media
- elektro 2012-2014, acquired by Townsquare Media

=== Outdoor living ===
- The New Pioneer
- Harris' Farmer's Almanac
- America Frontiersman

=== Small Business ===
- Small Business Opportunities
- Get Rich At Home
- Start Your Own Business

=== Sports ===
- Pro Football Draft
- College Football Guide
- Basketball Draft
- SLAM Magazine—acquired by Peterson Publishing in 1998

=== Guns and weapons ===
- Ballistic
- Combat Handguns
- Guns & Weapons for Law Enforcement
- Guns of the Old West
- Tactical Weapons
- Personal & Home Defense (published bi-annually)
- Special Weapons for Military & Police
- Survivor's Edge
- Tactical Knives
- Tactical Life

=== Guns (annual) ===
- Gun Buyers Guide—2012, 2014 & 2015
- The Complete Book of Guns—2015
- The Complete Book of Handguns—2012 through 2015
- Gun Annual—2014
- The Complete Rifleman—1989 through 2011

=== Wellness ===
- Naturally, Danny Seo
- Herbal Remedies

=== Miscellaneous ===
- PC How-To Guide
- Woman—acquired by Condé Nast Publications in 1988
- ANTENNA
- Honey acquired by Vanguarde Media in 1999
