= TFcon =

Transformers fan convention held annually since 2002

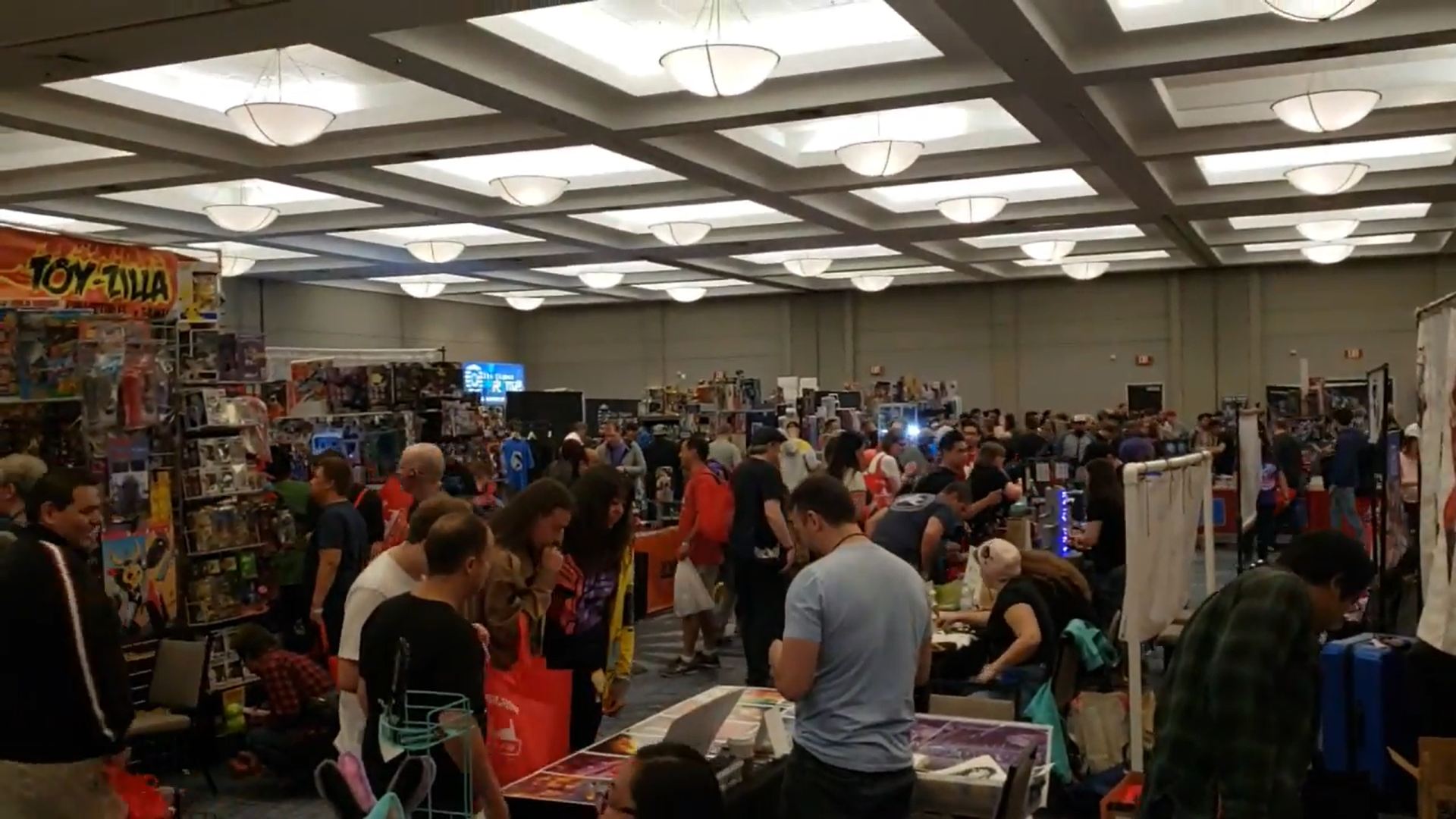
- Vendors and attendees at TFcon 2019 in Burbank, California
- Status: Active
- Genre: Transformers fan convention
- Country: Canada, United States
- Inaugurated: November 10, 2002
- Attendance: 3,000+
- Organizer: Colin Douglas
- Website: http://www.tfcon.com

TFcon is a fan convention dedicated to the Transformers multimedia franchise held annually in North America since 2002.

== History ==
The first TFcon was held in Hamilton, Ontario, and had 200 people in attendance. The first venue was the back of a hockey rink. It was established by Colin Douglass and Aaron Black with the goal of helping Black sell his Transformers toy collection in order to afford a down payment on his home. Twenty toy sellers were present, including Black.

By 2010, TFcon was the largest Transformers convention in Canada. The convention often hosts guest speakers involved with the Transformers franchise such as actors, writers, and artists. Starting in 2012, TFcon has been hosting a charity auction for the Make-A-Wish Foundation each summer. In 2012, it raised over $50,000 for the charity. In 2016, TFcon had 3,000 people in attendance and was described as the "world's largest fan-run Transformers convention". The convention typically hosts cosplay contests. In 2023, following the signing of a bill in Florida which restricted drag shows in venues where children might be present, crossplay was restricted at the convention in Florida that year. Refunds were made available for individuals who felt unsafe attending.

== See also ==
- BotCon
