= Kishino =

Kishino (written: 岸野) is a Japanese surname. Notable people with the surname include:

- Andrew Kishino, (born 1970) Japanese Canadian American voice-over artist and rapper
- Katsumi Kishino, Japanese engineer
- Kazuhiko Kishino (岸野 一彦, born 1934), Japanese actor and voice actor
- Rika Kishino (岸野 里香, born 1994), Japanese singer and idol
- Yasuyuki Kishino (岸野 靖之, born 1958), Japanese footballer and manager
- Yukimasa Kishino (岸野 幸正, born 1955), Japanese voice actor
