= Transformers: Zone =

Japanese original video animation

- DVD cover

トランスフォーマー ゾーン
- Genre: Adventure; Mecha
- Original video animation
- Directed by: Hiromichi Matano
- Produced by: Kenji Yokoyama; Tatsuya Yoshida; Hisao Yamada; Masaharu Takayama
- Written by: Toyohiro Ando
- Music by: Katsunori Ishida; Michiaki Watanabe
- Studio: Toei Animation
- Licensed by: Hasbro
- Released: July 21, 1990
- Runtime: 30 minutes
- Manga
- Written by: Masumi Kaneda
- Illustrated by: Ban Magami
- Published by: Kodansha
- Magazine: TV Magazine
- Original run: April 1990 – January 1991
- Volumes: 1

Transformers: Zone (トランスフォーマーZ(ゾーン)) is a Japanese original video animation (OVA) in the fictional Transformers universe. It was released on July 21, 1990, on VHS and on April 21, 2004, on DVD in Japan. An unofficial fan-made English dub was released on TFCog.com in March 2004.

== Story ==
Following on from Victory, the mysterious three-faced insectoid being Violen Jiger dispatches the "Nine Great Demon Generals"—Devastator, Menasor, Bruticus, Trypticon, Predaking, Abominus, King Poseidon, Overlord and BlackZarak—to acquire "Zone Energy", destroying the planet Feminia to obtain the world's store and in search of the powerful Zodiac. Caught in the destruction of the planet, Star Saber is rescued by Dai Atlas, who then repels an attack by the Decepticons on Earth, and is appointed the new Autobot commander at the conclusion of the episode, following a battle with the Decepticons and unlocking the power of the Zodiac that was found on Earth.

== Characters ==
The cast of Zone is composed heavily of Micromasters, who also made up much of the toyline. Dai Atlas is a "Powered Master", so named for his motorized gimmick, as is his combining partner Sonic Bomber—the toyline also featured another partner for them, Roadfire, who was not in the episode. The solitary Decepticons in the toyline were the Race Track Patrol, and Metrotitan, a redeco of the Autobot city Metroplex, neither of whom appeared in animated form. None of the Decepticon Generals ever appeared in toy form.

=== Cybertron (Autobots） ===
Powered Masters / Big Powered: The three Powered Masters combined into a super vehicle.

- Dai Atlas – Drill Tank / Jet / Base
  - Speeder – Futuristic Car
- Sonic Bomber – Jet / Base
  - Sonic – Porsche 944
- Road Fire – Tank / Base
  - Drill Buster – Drill Tank

Micromasters: The Micromasters include:

- Transports

Overload
Erector
Black Heat
Deadhour
Gingham
Road Hugger
Flattop

- Battle Stations

Ironworks
Hot House
Airwave

- Bases

Groundshaker
Skyhopper

Others:

Victory Saber (Voiced by Hideyuki Tanaka)
Galaxy Shuttle

=== Destron（Decepticons） ===
Nine Great Generals (九大魔将軍): The Nine Great Generals include:

Overlord (Voiced by
Keiichi Noda)
Super God General; leader of the Nine.
Devastor (Devastator) (Voiced by
Hirohiko Kakegawa)
Engineering General
Menazol (Menasor) (Voiced by
Masato Hirano)
Intelligence General
Bruticus (Voiced by
Yukimasa Kishino)
Fire General
Dinasaurer (Trypticon) (Voiced by
Daisuke Gōri)
Dinosaur General
Predaking (Voiced by
Yukimasa Kishino)
Beast General
Abominus (Voiced by
Yukimasa Kishino)
Monster General
King Poseidon (Voiced by
Masato Hirano)
Aquatic General
Black Zarak (Voiced by
Hirohiko Kakegawa)
Dark Spirit General

Micromaster Race Track Patrol:

Barricade
F-1 Racer

=== Others ===
Organics: Cain is a Nebulanoid boy from planet Feminia with a winged rabbit named Emusa. They meet a little boy named Akira when they come to Earth.

Violengiguar: A monstrous insectoid being who assembles the Nine Great Generals in a bid to acquire Zone Energy.

An alternate version was featured in "Ask Vector Prime" under the name Violengiguar, Lord of the Tenth Planet, and assembled a force of Thirteen "Great Demon" Generals to serve his ambitions:

- Zarak Maximus, the Fusion Paranoia General, born after the Nebulan Zarak fused together the remains of several Autobots and Decepticons and was consumed by their feuding personalities.
- Hydratron, the Stygian Anguish General, provided by the Quintessons.
- Volcanicon, the Transwarp Pandemic General, seeking to avenge Planet Dinosaur.
- Obsidian, the Radiation Mutilation General, Volcanicon's twin.
- Sixshot, the Filicide Ninjitsu General, sent in place of an uninterested Shockwave.
- Monstructor, the Nightmare Abyss General, offered up to Violengiguar by the Ebon Knights.
- Gigatron, the Destronger Chōkon General, who came to Iga's side from beyond time.
- Ruination, the Arctic Decay General, recovered from a frozen wasteland in a Viron Cluster universe.
- Toxitron, the Miasma Apostate General, given to Violengiguar by an equivalent to Starscream who broke the components free from confinement.
- Ragnarok, the Genetronic Apocalypse General, who was freed by Violengiguar from a "dead end universe."
- Puzzler, the Cybernetic Subjugation General, a cyborg gestalt permanently fused by Violengiguar.
- Shokaract, the Omega Singularity General.
- Galvatronus, the Deceptigod Emperor General, who was selected by Violengiguar as the leader of his generals.

== Cast ==
- Yusaku Yara as Dai Atlas
- Kaneto Shiozawa as Sonic Bomber
- Eiko Yamada as Kain
- Naoko Watanabe as Akira
- Yumi Tōma as Emusa
- Hideyuki Tanaka as Victory Saber
- Ryō Horikawa as Moonradar & Detour
- Tsutomu Kashiwakura as Rabbitcrater & Whisper
- Kyōko Tongū as Holi
- Hiroyuki Satō as Sunrunner & Roadhugger
- Junko Shimakata as Micro Transformer 1
- Mayumi Seto as Micro Transformer 2
- Daisuke Gōri as Violen Jiger & Trypticon
- Masato Hirano as King Poseidon, Menasor & Starcloud
- Yukimasa Kishino as Predaking & Abominus & Bruticus & Black Zarak
- Hirohiko Kakegawa as Devastator
- Kei'ichi Noda as the narrator & Overlord

== Music ==
- Openings
1. "Transformers Z Theme" (トランスフォーマーZのテーマ)
  - Lyricist: Machiko Ryu / Composer: Komune Negishi / Arranger: Katsunori Ishida / Singers: Ichiro Mizuki
- Endings
1. "To You of the Future" (未来の君へ)
  - Lyricist: Machiko Ryu / Composer: Komune Negishi / Arranger: Katsunori Ishida / Singers: Ichiro Mizuki

== Development ==
Originally intended to be a full TV series, Transformers: Zone was forced to become direct-to-video (OVA) due to less than expected toy sales. The series was cancelled after just one episode at 25 minutes. It is considered the last TF Generation 1 animated movie and the last series in the Japanese Transformers Generation 1 saga.

== Adaptations and continuation ==
Prior to the OVA, TV Magazine published a one-shot Zone manga in its April 1990 issue, followed by a series of illustrations with accompanying texts (published between August 1990 and January 1991, and later released in print form in English in Volume 3 of Transformers: The Manga) that continued the story of the manga and OVA. A new threat emerges in the form of a gestalt called Metrotitan who, along with his 4 base soldiers (the Metrosquad) goes on a rampage throughout space and attacks Earth with a freeze beam but is eventually defeated by Road Fire. Violengiguar subsequently heads to Earth; stealing the Zodiac and kidnapping Akira, Kain and some Autobots. They are rescued by the Powered Masters, who also retrieve the Zodiac after a battle with Violengiguar on his homeworld (the mysterious tenth planet), who transforms himself into his true form (a combination of the ghosts of the dead Decepticon soldiers). The Powered Masters harness this threat by utilizing the Zodiac's power to charge their combined jet form Big Powered to fight him. They unleash a rainbow beam that destroys Violengiguar, while returning the sunlight that Violengiguar once blocked from the planet, turning it into a lush green world.

TV Magazine had always included Transformers manga story pages and splash illustrations with explanatory text. These story pages were used to provide supporting fiction for the remaining two years' worth of toylines—1991's Battlestars: Return of Convoy and 1992's Operation: Combination.
