= Transformers: Super-God Masterforce =

Japanese anime television series

- North American DVD cover, depicting Overlord and Ginrai
- トランスフォーマー 超神マスターフォース
- Genre: Adventure; Mecha
- Created by: Masumi Kaneda; Ban Magami
- Developed by: Hiroyuki Hoshiyama
- Directed by: Tetsuo Imazawa
- Music by: Katsunori Ishida
- Country of origin: Japan
- Original language: Japanese
- No. of episodes: 42

Production
- Producers: Nobuyuki Okude; Kenji Yokoyama; Tatsuya Yoshida
- Production companies: Takara Co., Ltd.; Toei Animation

Original release
- Network: NNS (NTV)
- Release: April 12, 1988 – March 7, 1989

Related
- Manga
- Written by: Masumi Kaneda
- Illustrated by: Ban Magami
- Published by: Kodansha
- Magazine: TV Magazine
- Original run: March 1988 – February 1989
- Volumes: 1

Transformers: Super-God Masterforce (トランスフォーマー 超神マスターフォース) is a Japanese Transformers line of toys and anime series that ran from April 12, 1988, to March 7, 1989, for 42 episodes. On July 3, 2006, the series was released on DVD in the UK, and it was aired on AnimeCentral in the UK a few years later. In 2008, Madman Entertainment released the series on DVD in Australia in Region 4, PAL format. On May 1, 2012, the series was released on DVD in the US. It serves as the second sequel series to the Japanese dub of the original The Transformers cartoon series as part of the Generation 1 franchise, preceded by Transformers: The Headmasters and followed by Transformers: Victory.

== Story ==
The core concept of Masterforce begins with the human beings themselves rising up to fight and defend their home, rather than the alien Transformers doing it for them. Going hand-in-hand with this idea, the Japanese incarnations of the Autobot Pretenders actually shrink down to pass for normal human beings, whose emotions and strengths they value and wish to safeguard. The Decepticon Pretenders tend to remain large monsters, unless they battle in their robot forms.

Later on children and adults would be recruited to become Headmaster Juniors for both the Autobots and Decepticons. As the story progressed, the story focuses more on the Godmasters (released as Powermasters in the West) and they became the more powerful Transformers on the show. The Godmasters themselves are human beings with the ability to merge with their Transtectors (robot bodies). Most of the Godmasters would be adults with the exception of Clouder who is about the same age as the Junior Headmasters.

Other characters would later appear, including Black Zarak who would later merge with the Decepticons leader; Devil Z for the final battle and for the Autobots comes Grand Maximus who has a Pretender guise and is Fortress Maximus' younger brother. Also the Firecons make a brief appearance in one episode and a robot who transforms into a gun (similar to G1 Megatron) was given to Cancer of the Headmaster Junior Decepticons as a gift from Lady Mega. His name was Browning (or BM in the dub).

The Decepticons also had the Targetmaster Seacons under their command, but like the Pretenders, they were sentient robots and didn't require humans to operate them. The Autobots would also gain the help of another sentient robot called Sixknight (Or as he is known outside Japan; Quickswitch), who appeared on Earth as a travelling warrior who wanted to challenge Ginrai (who is the Godmaster of the body of Optimus Prime) to a battle, but soon decided for himself to fight for the Autobots cause. The story basically tells the efforts of the heroic Autobot forces as they protect the Earth from the Decepticons. Only this time round, human characters played a more important role than in other Transformers series.

== Development ==
With the conclusion of the US Transformers cartoon series in 1987, Japan produced their first exclusive anime series, Transformers: The Headmasters, to replace the fourth and final US season and to carry out the story concepts begun in The Transformers: The Movie and carried on through the third season, using the existing cast and adding the eponymous Headmasters into the mix. With the completion of the series, the evil Decepticons had finally been forced off Earth, and the stage was set for the beginning of Super-God Masterforce.

Although nominally occurring in the same continuity as the previous Transformers series, there was a very obvious effort on head writer Masumi Kaneda's part to make Masterforce a "fresh start" as a mecha story, introducing an entirely new cast of characters from scratch, rather than using any of the previous ones. To this end, although the toys are mostly the same in both Japan and the West (barring some different color schemes), the characters which they represent are vastly different—most prominently, Powermaster Optimus Prime's counterpart is Ginrai, a human trucker who combines with a transtector (a non-sentient Transformer body, a concept lifted from Headmasters) to become a Transformer himself, the same applies to the other Powermasters' counterparts; the Godmasters. The Pretender figures released during that year were the same but in Masterforce the Autobot pretenders disguise themselves as regular-sized humans that can wear normal clothing instead of being giant humans wearing armor as they were in contemporary Marvel comics.

The attempt to start things afresh with Masterforce does give rise to some continuity quirks, however, such as Earth technology being portrayed as contemporary, rather than futuristic as in 2010 and Headmasters, and some characters being totally unaware of what Transformers are, even though they have been public figures for over two decades.

The show never supplied the viewer with the full backstory of the characters. The true goals and identities of the key villains Devil Z and BlackZarak were also left unexplained. Even the timeframe of the show was never revealed, with the series taking place an indeterminate amount of time after Headmasters.

Additional information for the characters and their setting was later provided in made-for-video clip shows and other media. In a Special Secrets episode, Shuta and Grand Maximus explained and revealed several pieces of trivia about the show.

== Adaptations ==
The series was dubbed into English in Hong Kong by the dubbing company; Omni Productions, for broadcast on the Malaysian TV channel, RTM1 along with Headmasters and the following series, Victory. These dubs, however, are more famous for their time on the Singapore satellite channel, Star TV, where they were grouped under the umbrella title of "Transformers Takara", and all given Victory's opening sequence. Later acquired by the US Transformers animated series creator Sunbow Productions, they were given English-language closing credits (even including the English Transformers theme), but no official release of them has ever been carried in the US, because of their poor quality. Performed by a small group (less than half-a-dozen actors), the dubs feature many incorrect names and nonsensical translations - in the case of the Masterforce, especially, all the English-equivalent names are used for the characters, so throughout the series, the clearly human Ginrai is referred to as "Optimus Prime", and the little blonde girl called Minerva is referred to by the inappropriate name "Nightbeat".

In 2006, the complete series was released in Region 2 with the Japanese audio with subtitles (although like Shout! Factory, it does not contain the English dub). For the Shout! Factory release, the Cybertronians are still referred to as Autobots and the Destrons are still known as the Decepticons, and many of the characters are given the names of the American releases of their toys.

A twelve-chapter manga adaptation of this anime was written by Masami Kaneda and illustrated by Ban Magami.

== Theme songs ==
- Openings
1. "Super-God Masterforce Theme" (超神マスターフォースのテーマ)
  - April 12, 1988 - March 7, 1989
  - Lyricist: Machiko Ryu / Composer: Masahiro Kawasaki / Arranger: Masahiro Kawasaki / String Arranger: Tomoyuki Asakawa / Singers: Toshiya Igarashi
  - Episodes: 1–47
- Endings
1. "Let's Go! Transformers" (燃えろ！トランスフォーマー)
  - April 12, 1988 - March 7, 1989
  - Lyricist: Machiko Ryu / Composer: Masahiro Kawasaki / Arranger: Masahiro Kawasaki/ String Arranger: Tomoyuki Asakawa / Singers: Toshiya Igarashi, Mori no Ki Jido Gassho-dan
  - Episodes: 1–47
- Insert Songs
1. "Miracle Transformers" (奇跡のトランスフォーマー)
  - September 13, 1988, November 1, 1988, November 15, 1988, December 6, 1988
  - Lyricist: Machiko Ryu / Composer: Masahiro Kawasaki / Arranger: Masahiro Kawasaki / Singers: Toshiya Igarashi
  - Episodes: 20, 27, 29, 32
2. "Advance! Super-God Masterforce" (進め！超神マスターフォース)
  - September 27, 1988, November 8, 1988
  - Lyricist: Machiko Ryu / Composer: Masahiro Kawasaki / Arranger: Masahiro Kawasaki / Singers: Toshiya Igarashi
  - Episodes: 22, 28
3. "WE BELIEVE TOMORROW"
  - December 13, 1988, February 28, 1989
  - Lyricist: Machiko Ryu / Composer: Komune Negishi / Arranger: Kimio Nomura / Singers: Toshiya Igarashi
  - Episodes: 33, 42
4. "Super Ginrai Theme" (スーパージンライのテーマ)
  - Lyricist: Machiko Ryu / Composer: Komune Negishi / Arranger: Katsunori Ishida / Singers: Toshiya Igarashi
  - Episodes: 34, 39
5. "Transform! Godmaster" (変身！ゴッドマスター)
  - Lyricist: Machiko Ryu / Composer: Masahiro Kawasaki / Arranger: Kimio Nomura / Singers: Toshiya Igarashi
  - Episodes: None
6. "Small Warrior: Headmaster Jr Theme" (小さな勇士～ヘッドマスターJrのテーマ～)
  - Lyricist: Kayoko Fuyusha / Composer: Komune Negishi / Arranger: Katsunori Ishida / Singers: Yumi Toma, Hiroko Emori, Yuriko Yamamoto
  - Episodes: None
7. "See See Seacons" (See See シーコンズ)
  - Lyricist: Kayoko Fuyusha / Composer: Komune Negishi / Arranger: Katsunori Ishida / Singers: Masato Hirano
  - Episodes: None
8. "Ruler of the Universe: Devil Z" (宇宙の支配者･デビルZ)
  - Lyricist: Machiko Ryu / Composer: Komune Negishi / Arranger: Katsunori Ishida / Singers: Toshiya Igarashi
  - Episodes: None

== Episodes ==
No.	Title	Original release date
1	"Rise Up!! Pretenders" (立て！！ プリテンダー)	April 12, 1988
A cruise ship is sailing along peacefully when it is attacked by the Decepticon Pretenders Bomb-Burst, Submarauder, and their Seacon drones. Meanwhile, in Japan, young Shuta is participating in a soccer match and being cheered on by his father and their friend Hawk, who soon receive a message informing them of Decepticon activities. Recognizing his old foes, Hawk reveals to Shuta that he is in fact Metalhawk, an Autobot and a member of a Transformers group known as the Pretenders with the ability to take on the appearance of living things. He and his fellow Autobot Pretenders defeated Bomb-Burst, Submarauder, and their comrade Skullgrin thousands of years ago after taking on human form while the Decepticon Pretenders adopted demonic appearances, and trapped the three across the globe. The trio, now having escaped their prisons, reunite and have their Tentakil drones attack Japan, which prompts Metalhawk to summon his comrades Waverider, Cloudburst, and Landmine before going into action, only to be followed by Shuta. A confrontation between him and the Decepticons soon ensues, with the outnumbered Metalhawk faring poorly and Shuta ending up being captured and held hostage. The other Autobots arrive just in time to turn the tide and save Shuta, destroying the Tentakils and driving off the Decepticon Pretenders.
2	"Fearsome! The Destrons' Manhunt" (恐怖！ デストロンの人間狩り)	April 19, 1988
The Decepticon Pretenders raid a hospital morgue and steal a number of corpses, which Bomb-Burst animates through some dark means to create zombie minions for the Decepticon Pretenders. These creatures-known as Destroids-attack and prove more than a match for human law enforcement, but are swiftly handled by the Autobot Pretenders and disappear after being active a short time. Realizing that utilizing reanimated humans is a poor strategy, the Decepticons set their sights on living humans, and choose the small island nation of Karin to capture their new minions. Prince Cab, heir to the throne of Karin, soon learns of their activities and the Autobots existence after the latter arrive with Shuta in answer to reports of Decepticon activity in the area. Learning that the Decepticons have violated the sacred Island of the Gods, Cab goes alone to confront them only to be captured and taken to where a number of his countrymen are being held captive. He manages to escape and then witnesses the arrival of the Autobots, who defeat the Decepticons once again and drive them off. At the urging of Cab's grandfather, the Autobots offer to take Cab with them to Japan where he has been accepted at the International School, and Cab willingly accepts. Bomb-Burst has taken advantage of the absence of three of the Headmasters to attack the observatory where Shuta lives with his father, leveling it and leaving the Professor badly wounded and trapped under rubble with Landmine. The others manage to dig them out, and Shuta's father dies after handing him a mysterious key, having agreed with Metalhawk that "the time has come to use them" without disclosing what he is referring to. The Autobots, Shuta, and Cab soon relocate to their new hidden base, prepared to continue the fight against the Decepticons.
3	"Kidnapping!? The Targeted Jumbo Jet" (誘拐！？ 狙われたジャンボジェット)	April 26, 1988
An airline from Mont Porte is hijacked by Bomb-Burst over the English Channel, leading the Autobot Pretenders to investigate. They soon learn of a second flight being attacked, and upon investigating learn from a young passenger named Minerva that Bomb-Burst was responsible for this attack as well. The passengers of the first flight then appear in Rome as Destroids, attacking the city and causing havoc, which prompts the Autobots to travel there and use anesthesia to knock them out. They then confront the Decepticon Pretenders, who have been discussing their plans for a biologist who was known to have been aboard one of the two flights, and force the three to retreat. The Autobots board a flight with Minerva, her parents, and the biologist, which is then attacked by Bomb-Burst in flight, leading Metalhawk and Cloudburst to confront him and resulting in Minerva learning the Autobots' secret. The stewardess aboard the flight turns into a Destroid as well and tries to take over the flight, but Shuta and Cab manage to subdue her after a considerable struggle and the Autobots save the plane after defeating Bomb-Burst and his Seawing drones. Arriving safely in Japan, the biologist proves to have the knowledge of how to cure the Destroids, and Minerva is invited to study at the International School with Shuta and Cab.
4	"Birth! Headmaster Jr." (誕生！ヘッドマスターJr.)	May 3, 1988
Metalhawk discusses the numerous unexplained occurrences in Earth's history, which the Autobots have long feared may be tied to Decepticon activity on Earth. After the boys express their strong desire to help the Autobots, Metalhawk invites them to the Autobot base after school, and they are unexpectedly joined by Minerva after sharing the news with her. The three children are then given Master Bracelets, which allow them to tap into the power of Masterforce and gain robotic armor, making them the Headmaster Juniors with the ability to transform. Gifted with incredible speed and strength, the boys are quickly amazed, but then learn that the Masterforce is not intended for revenge and that their bracelets will be reclaimed if they take that path. The children then receive Transtector vehicles-Cab a fire truck, Shuta a police car, and Minerva an ambulance-that they are able to drive using the Masterforce. The three are then informed that they have the ability to transform into robots just as the Autobot Pretenders can become humans, with the intention of them becoming a rescue team to protect the people of Earth. Unbeknownst to them, the Decepticons have recruited their own monstrous Headmaster Juniors-Fangry, Horri-Bull, and Squeezeplay-whom they soon unleash upon a nearby city. After transforming into robots for the first time-with Shuta adopting the identity of Goshooter-the children learn that the Autobots had prepared for the Decepticon Pretenders' eventual return, and that the other Autobots and Decepticons have been battling in space since the events of The Headmasters. Chromedome of the Headmasters was able to provide them with the Transtectors the children are now using, but several were stolen on their way to Earth-the ones now being used by the Decepticons. The Autobots soon launch into action, with the Headmster Jrs. taking on their rescue duties while the Pretenders engage the Decepticon forces. Shuta is soon confronted by the Decepticon Headmaster Jrs., but is unable to fight them due to his promise to Metalhawk, who arrives in time to keep things from escalating. The Decepticons soon flee again, and the Autobots move forward with Metalhawk confident that his young friends can learn to become great heroes.
5	"Rampage!! Little Devils with no Need for Rules" (大暴れ！！ ルール無用の小さな悪魔)	May 10, 1988
The Autobot Headmaster Jrs. are invited to America by Waverider, while the Decepticon Headmaster Jrs. learn of their leader Fangry's past as part of a motorcycle gang who were crushed by a rival group, prompting him to seek revenge. Waverider then begins training the Headmaster Jrs. in combat simulations, with their initial attempts going poorly for Cab and Minerva. The battle between Bikers and Decepticon Headmasters begins, and the thugs are quickly overpowered by the suit-equipped youngsters, who are operating under orders from the Decepticon Pretenders to inspire others to seek membership in the Decepticon ranks. They soon begin attacking local law enforcement, with their newly recruited biker minions joining in. Learning of this, Shuta rushes off to challenge them despite Minerva's objections, and is quickly joined by Cab while Minerva stays behind until she is eventually moved by the danger to others. Shuta soon engages the Decepticons while Minerva links up with Cab and they go in search of a young girl she saw get trapped on television, but they are then spotted by one of the bikers, who alert the Decepticon Headmasters. The villains leave a Seawing to deal with Shuta and close in on Minerva and Cab, and their cruelty moves Minerva to take action and join the battle. They succeed in driving off the Decepticon Headmasters and then go to Shuta's aid, and with the aid of an arriving Waverider take out the Seawing drone. The three young heroes are left with an appreciation for teamwork and-in Minerva's case-a new level of courage.
6	"Go Goshooter: Showdown in the Wasteland" (行けゴーシューター・荒野の対決)	May 17, 1988
The Decepticon Headmaster Jrs. are taught about the three great powers or Energons on Earth: Earth Energon, Spark Energon, and Star Energon, which can be stolen and added to their power at the cost of harming the balance of the universe. The Autobot Headmaster Jrs., meanwhile, are preparing for a party when a girl named Mary comes to them for help, her brother being a former member of Fangry's motorcycle gang who sought to cut ties with him after he joined forces with the Decepticons and was kidnapped as a result. She soon recalls a hideout of theirs in the desert, which Mary's brother Chris has been brought to by the biker gang in Fangry's effort to convince him to side with them. However, Chris refuses, feeling that Fangry's alliance with the Decepticons has changed him into a person he can no longer be friends with, which prompts Fangry to begin brutally beating him. Mary and the Autobots soon arrive, and Shuta takes on the Decepticon Headmasters while his friends attend to Chris and Mary, only for Mary to be captured, forcing the Autobot Headmaster Jrs. to put up no resistance. However, Chris recovers and intervenes, freeing Mary and allowing the Autobots to fight back and make their escape. The new friends soon enjoy a party with Waverider, while Submarauder accuses Fangry of weakness and is then punished by a mysterious orb of energy that floats within the Decepticon headquarters.
7	"Panic! Protect the Wild Animals!!" (パニック！ 野生動物を守れ！！)	May 24, 1988
In Kenya, various animals began to stampede into local villages and the Detsrons are responsible; Blood explains it is meant to upset the balance of nature. Minerva decided to dress in a safari-themed outfit, but this gets her made fun of by the boys. While the autobots search for clues to what started the stampedes the kids join the ranger Ricky, who regrettably had to orphan a fawn in order to save a school. Meanwhile, the Destrons have Seacons keep the autobot-pretenders occupied while they induce a herd of elephants to stampede at Ricky's village (while riding them). Ricky, unable to shoot at the elephants like with the adult fawns, is willing to give himself up to stop the elephants. Thankfully Shuta, Cab and the pretenders takeover and calm the elephants down, resulting in the Destrons retreating. Minerva also managed to nurse the fawn back to health, who happily gallops into the sunset.
8	"The Super Warriors: The Godmaster Brothers" (超戦士・ゴッドマスター兄弟)	May 31, 1988
The Destrons and their headmaster-juniors are summoned to the hideout of the godmasters (a kind of modified version of headmasters who turn into engines rather than heads). As Shuta, Cab and Minerva compete in a hang-glider race, the godmasters Hydra and Buster harass and slaughter a group of jet-fighters, then all Destrons turn their sights on the hang-glider race. However once the autobot-pretenders arrive it all goes south, so the godmasters resort to combining into Darkwing, but even this made no difference and the Destrons back off. Even though the race was canceled there were no deaths, but Hawk fears what other surprises the decepticons have in store for them.
9	"A Fierce Battle! The Cybertrons are in Trouble" (激戦！！ サイバトロン危うし)	June 7, 1988
The Decepticons plan to move to a new base, with Mega intending to convert their current one into a secret lab. Meanwhile, Cab has a bad day of getting everyone to scold at him (first his teacher, then Hawk). Mega then plans to eliminate all of southeast Asia's energy-sources, starting with the new tidal-wave power plant on Visca island near Cab's home. Only Buster and Hydra are allowed to do so, much to the main-Destron's dismay, though they are allowed to ravage an oil-refinery, however the autobots once again thwart them all. Buster is angry that he is not as strong as he thought, but Mega and Giga assure him that he is powerful, and he vows to prove it, all the while Shuta wonders why there aren't any autobot godmasters.
10	"A Hero is Chosen - His Name is Ginrai" (選ばれたヒーロー・その名はジンライ)	June 14, 1988
More godmasters have been detected, but Giga fears they will defy him and Mega, so he has Hydra and Buster go searching. Meanwhile, a man named Ginrai uses an incredibly familiar truck to replace his original, which broke down, as he has to deliver a sick dolphin to a research institute where Diver works. While tinkering inside said truck, he finds a pair of godmaster-bracelets which become stuck to him, but he has long forgotten his heritage as he doesn't know what the bracelets really are. Elsewhere Hydra and Buster have discovered the truck sharing their regeneration-powers and, believing it to be a godmaster, track it down. The truck, however, starts to malfunction and drives itself off a cliff, and even worse, Hydra and Buster have arrived. Ginrai struggles to get out of the truck and in doing so activates the bracelets, gains a battle-suit and the truck transforms into an exact image of Optimus-Prime (with Ginrai becoming the engine-component). Ginrai, though inexperienced, manages to drive off Hydra and Buster, but is unable to comprehend what he really is.
11	"Ginrai: God On of Rage!!" (ジンライ・怒りのゴッドオン！！)	June 21, 1988
Giga tests out a new invention called the "Deathball" on an incoming aircraft, which explodes. Giga then tasks Hydra and Buster to use the deathball on Ginrai, whom Lander tries to recruit, but is turned down. While Ginrai hangs out with fellow truckers, Hydra and Buster slaughter some in their hunt for him. Concerned for his safety, Diver and Lander head out to find Ginrai, but he has decided to go looking for the decepticons himself (by being bait). Hydra and Buster locate him and plan to eliminate him, but Diver and Lander have other ideas as they arrive. Ginrai, stricken with grief over the loss of three friends, manages to send Hydra and Buster packing, but is far from done with them.
12	"A Strange Friendship: Cancer and Minerva" (奇妙な友情 キャンサーとミネルバ)	June 28, 1988
Ginrai discovers three more pairs of bracelets in his transtector and notifies the autobots, with Hawk requesting Ginrai to bring them over. Upon arriving, he heads to base with the autobot-headmaster-juniors, but the decepticon H.J.s, who were assigned to spy on Ginrai, fallow them, but Shūta senses their presence and he and Cab keep them busy, and with help from Ginrai beat them and take Cancer prisoner. While Minerva tries to be merciful, Ginrai is a bit more demanding, causing their ideals to clash. Regardless Cancer does admit that there are four more godmasters still out there. They then form a plan to have Cancer released (and tracked) to the Destron's lair after Shūta, Cab and Minerva have him rejoin Wilder and Bullhorn who were looking for him, now with Hydra and Buster on the scene, the former catching on the autobot-H.J.'s plan and destroys the tracker planted on Cancer, much to Hawk and Ginrai's alarm, and the latter rushes over there. Things go south when Buster holds Minerva at gunpoint, but to everyone's surprise Cancer saves her (though he claims it's payback for a drink she offered him), but nevertheless joins his allies in retreat.
13	"Friend or Foe!? The True Form of the Monster!!" (敵か味方か！？ モンスターの正体！！)	July 12, 1988
Ginrai reminisces the reason why he moved to America, while Minerva feels Ginrai hates her for berating him in the last episode, however he doesn't hate her at all: in fact he actually felt he deserved it. Meanwhile, Buster and Hydra continue hunting Ginrai: the former starting with japan while the latter patrols America. Suddenly Ginrai's transector takes off on its own with Ginrai while Shūta and Cab fallow, while at Nagano Prefecture (Ginrai's birthplace) construction workers make an unexpected discovery: a giant obelisk in a tunnel, and when Ginrai enters the obelisk rushes out, but the decepticon-juniors, having seen the event on the news, arrive to cause mayhem, and even more so when Hydra and Buster arrive. Suddenly the obelisk blasts the godmaster duo with a beam of energy and reveals itself to be a trailer, all for Ginrai.
14	"Eliminate the Godmaster Ginrai" (ゴッドマスタージンライを抹殺せよ)	July 19, 1988
Ginrai hopes to find the other godmasters like him and has a plan to do so: by showing his godmaster abilities on TV to draw in anybody who had similar experiences as he did. The decepticon-juniors had seen it too and notify their teammates, who send Hydra and Buster to kill him, though they also hope to turn humans against the autobots in the process, starting where Ginrai is currently working. While some humans do so (including friends of Ginrai), Ginrai's client Sam defends him, and Ginrai wants Hydra and Buster's heads for their web-of-lies. Luckily it doesn't last long as all of Ginrai's friends apologize and Lander clears his name to the citizens, Diver also remarks Ginrai would make a good leader while Giga and Mega have decided to unleash a unique group of Seacons.
15	"Heroic!! Birth of Super Ginrai" (壮絶！！ スーパージンライ誕生)	August 2, 1988
When the decepticon-headmaster-juniors attract a group of children with their surfing (and masterforce-powers), they get the idea to take the children hostage and bait them for Ginrai. Diver attempts to do recon, but is captured by Gilmer and thrown with the children. Even so he has a plan: have one of the children place his watch in the water, where it emits sound-waves his dolphins detect. The dolphins are set loose to track the sound-waves with the autobots using them as bloodhounds while Ginrai swims with them. During the skirmish Ginrai rescues Diver and the children. Minerva tries to get Cancer to defect to the autobots, to no avail. Upon discovering the motives of their plan, Dauros summons the seacon Turtler and his squad, where they combine into King Poseidon. Ginrai was being pummeled until one of the children urged him on and, fueled by the encouragement, summons his transector's trailer and links up with it, giving him the strength needed to defeat King Poseidon, killing all of them except for Turtler who beats a hasty retreat. The other autobots are awestruck at Ginrai's new look and dub it "Super-Ginrai".
16	"Lightfoot: A Dramatic Encounter" (ライトフット 劇的なる出逢い)	August 9, 1988
During the summer, Cab, Shūta and Minerva have a swimming-class. Cab tries to get a glimpse of Minerva's swimsuit and while he and Shūta do, they are caught red-handed in it (Minerva chews them out afterwards). Upon returning to base the trio were given some vacation-time. Meanwhile, Ginrai believes he has found another godmaster: a Canadian man named Lightfoot, and plans to meet him, though the decepticon pretenders locate him and, striving to impress Mega and Giga, follow him. Ginrai eventually meets Lightfoot, who began having similar experiences as Ginrai had. To prove his godmaster-bloodline, Ginrai first tests out his car, then presents one of the pair of godmaster-bracelets, and sure enough when Lightfoot triggers the bracelets, he and his car transform: the car becoming a spitting image of the autobot Getaway. The Destrons attack so Ginrai and Lightfoot make a run for it. They make their stand at a British-motors building and Ginrai once again transforms into Super-Ginrai, forcing the destrons to call the seacons for backup, but it didn't matter as Super-Ginrai again bests King Poseidon. With the danger passed, Ginrai takes lightfoot under his wing.
17	"An Enemy? Ranger the Third Godmaster" (敵？第三のゴッドマスターレインジャー)	August 16, 1988
The Autobots (now including Lightfoot) and decepticons head to the Canadian Rockies where the rest of the godmasters could be. Upon arrival Minerva catches sight of a patrolmen named Ranger socializing with the decepticon-headmaster-junior Bullhorn and becomes concerned of it. Later Ranger reveals he has found a rock much like the one Ginrai had found in Japan, which he's keeping in a barn. Turns out Ranger too is a godmaster, though he is less than convinced about it until the decepticon H.J. trio arrive and take the rock, and later being joined by Hydra and Buster. Under Ginrai's instructions Ranger works his powers and gains a Joyride-like transector. Once again the decepticon-godmasters fail (much to the fury of their overlord Devil Z). Minerva apologizes to Ranger for her suspicions before, though Shūta and Cab jokingly think Ginrai looked more evil, much to his offense. The autobots have gained another member.
18	"A Powerful Foe!! Sixknight the Wanderer" (強敵！！ さすらいのシックスナイト)	August 23, 1988
A military fleet out at sea suddenly find themselves under attack by an unidentified-flying-object that transforms into not one, not two, but at least three forms (first an alien-jet, then a giant-flying gun and finally a hovercraft), and the fleet is decimated. Hawk suspects it to be the work of another godmaster. The multi-changer soon arrives at the decepticon's base and introduces itself as Sixknight, who has come to assist the residing decepticons. Though declined in his offer Blood and Gilmer suggest he try defeating Ginrai and he accepts. Sixnight then causes havoc to lure Ginrai out and initially mistook Shūta for him. Sixnight reveals that he has beaten the best-opponents across the universe and Ginrai was next, though he prefers to do it honorably and thus doesn't take kindly to Blood trying to hold Minerva hostage to gain an advantage (though he was impressed by Ginrai's compassion for humanity). Once that was cleared up the dual continued, with Sixnight revealing he does not have three alternate-modes, but six, but even so it was Ginrai who emerges victorious and Sixnight is left stunned at the fact that Ginrai was really a human.
19	"At Full Strength! The Four Godmaster Gunmen" (勢揃い！ ゴッドマスター四銃士)	August 30, 1988
Wilder finds a clue to the next godmaster: a racer named Germain, whose car was virtually indestructible. Lightffoot and the autobot H.J.s attend the race in person and meet the famous racer Road King, while at the same time Ranger and Ginrai were scouring Europe for the same godmaster. The decepticon H.J.s attempt to force Germain to give up "his" car, to no avail. At the racecourse, things start off well, but then all the cars began crashing except for Road King's, who magically heals its damage. Lightfoot, upon seeing this radios Ginrai to come over as soon as possible. After Road King won the race, he meets Ginrai and sure enough, when Road King tries on the final pair of master-bracelets Lightfoot was right: Road King is the fourth godmaster and his car is a transector resembling Slapdash, but the moment was cut short when Ranger informs that the decepticon H.J.s were again trying to force info from Germain (who was in fact Road King's teacher), this time by force. Alarmed Road King heads on over to save him and the rest of the autobot members fallow. Even with Turtler and a group of seacons backing-up the decepticon-juniors, the autobots had the number-advantage and they are forced to retreat. With Road King now a member of the autobots, they celebrate a toast.
20	"The Cybertron Warrior: Sixknight?!" (サイバトロン戦士 シックスナイト？！)	September 13, 1988
With the search for the lost godmasters officially over, Metalhawk intends to pass leadership to Ginrai, though he's less than enthusiastic. Meanwhile, Cancer can't stop thinking about Minerva and her generosity, sparking a wedge between him and his friends. Mega attempts to cheer him up by giving him a mini-transformer named Browning who Cancer likes very much. Similarly Minerva can't stop thinking of Cancer, even remarking that Ranger's horse has similar eyes to Cancer's. Then Sixnight arrives, but not to fight, just to talk with Ginrai who agrees. Cancer, hoping to prove he's still villainous, heads to the autobot base with Wilder, Bullhorn and Browning in a helicopter: they intend to cause destruction to attract the autobots, but due to Browning being put into the pilot's chair, it doesn't go well. Sixnight is unable to comprehend how he lost to a mere human and refuses to accept that Ginrai won through his determination and care for others rather than brute-force, but the conversation is put on hold when Wilder, Bullhorn and Cancer go on their rampage and Sixnight decides to help. He personally faces off against the trio while the autobots stand and watch. Minerva again tries to encourage Cancer to defect, but is still refused. After Sixnight defeats them he plans to murder them but isn't sure if he should, however Browning stops him by transforming into a gun and having Minerva use him on Sixnight, giving the decepticons the chance to escape. Sixnight was intending to let them live anyway and with that bids farewell to the autobots, promising to meet again.
21	"Save the Little girl! Chojin Warrior Godmasters" (少女を救え！ 超神戦士ゴッドマスター)	September 20, 1988
Cab's childhood-friend Copo is struck by a circulatory disease, but the decepticons are kidnapping doctors all over the world: it is revealed by Mega that they intend to diminish humanity's will to live. Luckily at least one doctor, Dado, got away and directs the godmaster-autobots where to free the rest. While Road-King, Ranger and Lightfoot keep the Destrons busy, Ginrai sneaks pass to free the doctors, but couldn't exactly save all of them at once: despite this Copo's personal doctor named Rhodan was persuaded to go first so that he could cure Copo, and does, but the seacons refuse to let them leave without a fight. The godmasters unleash their best super-moves and triumph, then hurry to Viscas Island with Rhodan, who finally cures Copo.
22	"Life? Death? Lightfoot's Desperate Situation" (生か？死か？ 絶体絶命ライトフット)	September 27, 1988
Devil-Z calls in other Decepticons from space for back-up, and to bring in a new super-weapon. A fellow pretender named Grand Maximus, having discovered this, journeys to earth to warn the stationed-autobots and to destroy it: his plan is to upgrade super-Ginrai into "Godbomber" (Ginrai though is a bit offended that Grand doesn't think Ginrai can handle it without the upgrade). Meanwhile, Hydra and Buster have been tasked with eliminating the autobot-godmasters, starting with Lightfoot: they kidnap Lightfoot's father Leftfoot (and his workers) and when Lightfoot finds this out he doesn't waste a second coming to the rescue, but Hydra threatens to kill Leftfoot if Lightfoot doesn't either join the decepticons or surrender his bracelets. Initially Lightfoot went with the latter option, but Ginrai and Ranger show up to turn the tide: while the former distracts the decepticons with Lightfoot the latter frees the captives. During the battle Lightfoot vengefully rips off Buster's arm, prompting both villains to fallback, though not before destroying Leftfoot's factory. As a reward for their heroism, Leftfoot has the four godmaster-autobots to star in a new advert for his company.
23	"Expose the Destrons' Dark Trap!" (デストロンの黒い罠をあばけ！)	October 4, 1988
Lady Mega disguises herself as a fortuneteller to turn humanity against the Autobots, who at first didn't know about their involvement in predictions of disasters. Their latest plan was to destroy the Watson Dam where Giga, in his Overlord-like transector (affectionately named the "Gigatank"), successfully does after the Destron's weapons proved too weak to do so. The autobots though speed on over: the headmaster-junior trio take care of anyone threatened by the incoming water and in doing so prove they were the good-guys, while Ginrai personally chases Mega, but that is just what she wants him to do until the juniors intervene. In a last ditch attempt she telekinetically throws a meteor at a school fieldtrip, but Ginrai attempts to stop it, prompting all witnessing humans to mob Mega, who discards her disguise and flees in her Overlord-transector (affionately dubbed "Megajet") with the rest of the Decepticons. The autobots are then hailed as heroes.
24	"Super Ginrai Gets Blown Away in the Desert!?" (スーパージンライ砂漠に散る！？)	October 11, 1988
Devil Z has discovered Grand-Maximus' plan and tasks Hydra and Buster to destroy the Godbomber-project. Meanwhile, Ginrai gets invited to do a movie-stunt, but this was the duo's trap: during said stunt they rigged Ginrai's trailer and it is heavily damaged. Despite this Ginrai is still able to use it and defeats them, only for Mega and Giga to takeover. For the first time they combine into Overlord and actually triumph over Ginrai, but did not think to make sure he's dead: as they left Ginrai was very much alive.
25	"Will it be Destroyed! The Bomber Project" (破られるか！ ボンバー計画)	October 18, 1988
The decepticon super-weapon, the "BlackZarak", is scheduled to arrive on earth's moon and Mega and Giga are instructed to head there to wait for it, at the same Hydra and Buster continue their objective of destroying the Godbomber-project, this time with the Destrons backing them up. While the autobots struggle to finish their project and keep it safe, Road King creates a diversion of having a truck drive off. The decepticons take the bait, but it turns out the truck's cargo was Road King's transector and with Ranger and Lightfoot send the villains packing. While the project was safe, time wasn't on the autobot's side as Phoenix reports about Overlord on the moon.
26	"God Ginrai: Into Space!" (ゴッドジンライ・宇宙へ！！)	October 25, 1988
The Godbomber-project is nearly complete, but at the Weather Observatory Moon Base, Mega and Giga have taken over and Blackzarak is getting closer. Ginrai still sulks over his defeat at Overlord's hands two episodes ago until the Project was finally finished. Upon testing it out he becomes "God Ginrai" and sets course for the Moon to rescue the Moon base's staff who are being held hostage, but Mega and Giga, having been alerted to his approach by Devil Z, set off to stop him, but this time, it was Ginrai who was the better fighter and forces Overlord to fallback with Ginrai on his heels, but BlackZarak finally arrives for the ultimate battle.
27	"God Ginrai: Showdown on the Moon" (ゴッドジンライ・月面の対決)	November 1, 1988
Ginrai is being beaten to a pulp by BlackZarak and Overlord, although he manages to repel the latter. With no way to communicate Grand heads to the Moon, saving Ginrai in the nick of time. Now with the battle tipped in the Autobot's favor, BlackZarak tells Overlord to return to Earth while he holds off Ginrai and Grand. During the fight Ginrai blows BlackZarak's head off, but it doesn't kill him: his body flees into space. Grand then pursues him while Ginrai heads back home to an awaiting celebration.
28	"Overlord: Terror of the Super Soul Tornado" (オーバーロード・超魂竜巻の恐怖)	November 8, 1988
Giga plans to get revenge on Ginrai for their defeat on the Moon and has Hydra and Buster attack an oil-refinery in the Middle East to draw the Autobots out. Ginrai, along with Shūta, Cab and Minerva arrive and while the kids rescue civilians Ginrai faces off with the duo, but Giga attacks and separates Ginrai from Godbomber, however Godbomber reveals to have a mind of its own and attacks Giga. In a last ditch attempt the godmaster-leaders attempt to unleash a Chōkon Powered tornado, but Ginrai and Godbomber, while combined, bests the gruesome-twosome once more.
29	"Escape!! The Exploding Underwater Volcano" (脱出！！ 海底火山大爆発)	November 15, 1988
The Decepticons begin building a new base and in doing so inadvertently trigger an underwater volcano which also launches an earthquake on Sydney. Lightfoot goes off to investigate and while he does find the Decepticons, they found him as well. The Autobot-juniors provide with relief-efforts at the city while Ginrai searches for Lightfoot, but Turtler, having anticipated his arrival, attacks and while as King Poseidon hopes to bury them alive. Godbomber arrives and engages Poseidon, but the volcano starts to erupt, leveling the decepticon's base in the process. After defeating Poseidon the three heroes leave for the shoreline, where the volcano becomes a new island. Giga is fuming at another failure and decides to focus his efforts in taking Godbomber out of the game.
30	"Destroy Godbomber!!" (ゴッドボンバーを破壊せよ！！)	November 22, 1988
The Decepticon H.J.s create a ruckus by setting farm storehouses on fire. Ginrai and the Autobot H.J.s arrive to stop them, but this was all part of a trap: Mega and Giga assault Ginrai while Hydra and Buster prepare to take out Godbomber, but the juniors will not have it: they attempt to evacuate Godbomber but the brothers give chase. What no one expected was Sixnight joining in on the action as the Juniors began driving Godbomber to defeat Buster and then assist Ginrai, sending the decepticons running. After Sixnight again bids farewell, the juniors suspect that they too have Chōkon Power.
31	"Appearance!! The Final Godmaster" (出現！！最後のゴッドマスター)	November 29, 1988
A fifth godmaster has surfaced and his name is Clouder who initially sides with the Decepticons and his transector is a replica of Doubledealer. He arrives at the Decepticon's base and defeats King Poseidon in a test of power, though he unwittingly endangered a cruise-ship as well. Diver, Ginrai and the Autobot H.J.s come to the ship's aid and ultimately Clouder sides with the Autobots this time by helping an injured Minerva. In the end, the ship was saved and the villains back off, with the Autobots believing they have found another addition to the team, or so they think.
32	"Secret Orders! Destroy the Cybertron Base!!" (秘密指令！ サイバトロン基地を破壊せよ！！)	December 6, 1988
Turns out Clouder is really on the Decepticon's side and is being their spy: he steals info on the Autobot-base's location to the cons. Metalhawk has discovered is affiliation, but doesn't yet know it is him, and after Clouder planted (and sets off) explosions he Shūta and Cab begin to get suspicious while Ginrai and Minerva are in denial. As night falls Cancer unwittingly alerts the autobots to his and his teammate's presence and Metalhawk, Ranger and Clouder go on patrol, with Clouder finding the trio and handing over more info, but Metalhawk catches him doing so and he, Ranger and Lightfoot take him into custody. Clouder got away with handing out the data and Hydra and Buster ravage a city to get their attention, this was all a distraction though and while the autobot-godmasters take the bait the decepticon-juniors attack the base. Will the Autobots survive, or will the Decepticons finally win?
33	"Pinch! The Cybertron Base Explodes" (ピンチ！ サイバトロン基地大爆発)	December 13, 1988
Continuing the events from the previous episode, chaos ensues as Giga, Mega and the decepticon-juniors continue bringing the Autobot's base crashing down. With no communication Ginrai and his squad are unaware of this until Giga and Mega personally inform them. While Road King and Ranger help with the citizens Ginrai, Godbomber and Lightfoot race back to base. No sooner than they had returned Overlord instructs Turtler and his Seacons to destroy the base from the inside, trapping the remaining autobots (and Clouder) in it. Ginrai blasts a hole into the base for everyone to get out alive. Although the base was destroyed, Clouder, sickened at his own selfishness, casts off his alliance with the Decepticons in favor of the Autobots, on purpose this time, and leaves on good terms.
34	"Black Zarak: Destroyer From Space" (ブラックザラック・宇宙からの破壊者)	December 20, 1988
BlackZarak returns, now with the power to manipulate gravity and create black holes. Meanwhile, the Autobots have relocated to the Alps and plan to have Grand Maximus be their new base, though when he fails to show up on time Ginrai goes off looking for him. Overlord then attacks Paris while BlackZarak does the same to New York City. Meanwhile, Ginrai finds Grand who is stuck in one of BlackZarak's black holes and is caught himself. On earth Overlord gives the Autobots the choice to surrender or lose the city of Tokyo. The Autobot's attempts to stop them fail, but Ginrai and Grand, having managed to escape and annihilate the black hole, return and the Decepticons are thwarted, even so Ginrai is curtain they're not done.
35	"Crisis! The Day of the Downfall of Humanity" (危機！人類滅亡の日)	January 10, 1989
Devil Z begins the next phase of their plan: construction of a super-weapon on earth's moon intent on obliterating humanity's Jinchōkon. Mega and Giga, together with Hydra, Buster and the Decepticon-juniors, head up to the moon to prepare, but Grand picks up their trail and all Autobots fallow, where a brawl ensues. Devil-Z, infuriated at the Autobot's interference, decides to accelerate the plan and BlackZarak fires the weapon, the "Death Para-Machine", on earth, causing an apocalyptic cataclysm across the planet. As BlackZarak was about to unleash the killing blow Ginrai dives in and destroys the weapon. Despite the victory and that the damage already done will be fixed, earth wasn't out of danger yet.
36	"God Ginrai: Save Cancer!?" (ゴッドジンライ・キャンサーを救う！？)	January 17, 1989
The Decepticons resort to attacking the earth while on it while the Autobots try to stop them. The decepticon-juniors though are left in the base, and Cancer is alarmed to hear that BlackZarak is planning to attack his homeland in China, and rushes over there to warn everybody (although most runaway simply due to Cancer being there). Road King, who was eavesdropping, attempts to empathize with Cancer, only to get attacked and Cancer takes off. As Cancer sulks BlackZarak springs out of a river and attacks the town despite Cancer's protests, who then gets trapped under some rubble while saving his childhood-friend Chang. Ginrai and Road King distract BlackZarak while the Autobot-juniors protect the innocents, though only Minerva was willing to help Cancer. Overlord arrives to assist BlackZarak, but is not as selfish as him, and doesn't want to risk fighting for fear of injuring Cancer, unknowingly giving the autobots the opening to take them down. Cancer was stunned that they would rescue him, but Ginrai states he shares something with the autobots: a heart.
37	"God Ginrai: Showdown at the Destron Base" (ゴッドジンライ デストロン基地の決戦)	January 24, 1989
The Autobots search for the Decepticon's base, believing it to be in the ocean. Shūta is assigned on the reconnaissance with the unexpected help of Clouder. Hydra catches them doing so and notifies his allies, who then set a trap for the duo, and sure enough they get caught (naturally Shūta blames Clouder for it until Overlord proves he has indeed rebelled). Then the decepticons spread out to distract the autobots to insure Ginrai comes alone. Ginrai does, but Overlord threatens to have King Poseidon kill Shūta until Cancer, having had enough of the decepticon's cruel ways, rebels and saves Shūta. While Godbomber gets Shūta to safety, Cancer faces the wrath of the seacons for his treason when Bullhorn sides with him and lets him escape. The three hurry their way out, saving Clouder and after Godbomber helps Ginrai defeat Overlord, all escape (including Browning), complete with the knowledge of the decepticon base's location.
38	"The Ultimate Combination! New Lifeform Black Zarak" (究極合体！！ 新生命体ブラックザラック)	January 31, 1989
The Autobots prepare to attack the Decepticon's base now that they know where it is. Clouder and Cancer were allowed to tag-along, though everyone was concerned how the Decepticons would react to their betrayals. Initially they wanted to sneak in undetected, but the decepticons had anticipated them and it turns to a full on battle. The decepticons fallback into the base with the autobots fallowing, where Devil Z reveals himself (and merges with BlackZarak) and traps them all along with Wilder and Bullhorn in a cavern under the seabed. While Shūta and Cab leave to acquire jetpacks, they overhear the Destron's talking of Devil Z's plan: to blow up the decepticon's base (Wilder and Bullhorn were still in it, but Devil Z was disregarding them). While the Autobots scramble to evacuate Ginrai tries to encourage Wilder and Bullhorn to fallow, but they refuse to believe him or accept his help. Ginrai though saves them anyway (by knocking them out) and flees just as the base explodes.
39	"Battle to the Death!! God Ginrai VS Darkwings Reborn" (死闘！！ ゴッドジンライVS新生ダークウイングス)	February 7, 1989
The Autobots set up their mobile-base at Mount McKinley in Alaska while Cancer begs Wilder and Bullhorn to defect to the autobots like he had, but they refuse. The Decepticons meanwhile have set up in the Amazon rainforest. Hydra and Buster have come to the belief that their human-physiologies are preventing them from achieving victory and so ask Devil Z to give them more transformer-esque bodies, who does, much to Giga and Mega's horror. The Decepticons then create an array of disasters across America. Ginrai, Shūta, Cancer, Cab and Minerva track it to the Grand Canyon where Hydra and Buster reveal their new look and powers. The odds were against the heroes, until Wilder and Bullhorn lend a hand, much to Cancer's happiness. Ginrai manages to best Hydra and Buster, but it wasn't over yet, as proven when Overlord arrives...
40	"Cybertrons! Desperate Attack!!" (サイバトロン！ 決死のアタック！！)	February 14, 1989
Continuing from the last episode, Ginrai is worn-out from fighting the now mechanized Hydra and Buster, but Overlord has no intentions of letting him rest. While they duke it out, Ginrai tasks the others to find and stop BlackZarak. Coincidentally the ex-decepticon-juniors (Clouder, Cancer, Wilder, and Bullhorn) plan on eliminating BlackZarak as well. As for Ginrai and Overlord they continue to battle, but Overlord refuses to use his weapons in the fight as he wants to prove that their human-physiologies are not as weak as he thinks, even when Ginrai attempted to use a weapon, who was stunned to think Overlord would think so highly of Devil Z. After Grand takes him down both fallow the others toward BlackZarak. Lightfoot and Road King are intercepted by the Destrons who trap the duo in a cave, and King Poseidon ambushes Ranger, Shūta, Cab and Minerva. When the rebels attempted to intervene, their masterforce-bracelets suddenly remove themselves and reveal to have minds of their own. Before the fighting could finish, Devil Z decides to carry out his plans to Europe next and all Decepticons leave the area.
41	"Malevolent and Inhuman! The True Form of Devil Z" (極悪非道！ デビルZの正体)	February 21, 1989
Up on Matterhorn, BlackZarak begins desecrating Europe while the Autobots and the rebels (Cancer, Clouder, Wilder and Bullhorn, even though Devil Z had stripped them of their transectors) try to save as many as they can. Lightfoot, Ranger and Road King head up the mountain to confront BlackZarak, only to be buried alive in an avalanche. As the autobot juniors and Metalhawk deal with King Poseidon, Ginrai and Grand rescue their fellow godmasters, and Ginrai attempts to join the battle with Poseidon, but Hydra and Buster beg to differ. They reveal to be capable of entering the speed of light, but Ginrai mimics it and turns it against them. With the duo out of the way he now races to tackle Poseidon, defeating him. Returning to the other godmasters, Ginrai proceeds to fight BlackZarak, who was punishing Hydra and Buster for their failure. Overlord was disgusted at the mistreatment and enraged when BlackZarak offends him, sparking a brawl between them, enough to scare the Destrons away, while God-Ginrai intervenes to save Overlord, and receives help from Sixnight who challenges BlackZarak to a dual, only to be killed by his Devil Power. Ginrai and co, upon witnessing this, prepare for the ultimate face-off. Who will win?
42	"A Battle...And Then" (戦闘…そして)	February 28, 1989
Continuing from the previous episode, the fused BlackZarak/Devil Z and God Ginrai square off, however BlackZarak reveals he has a power-amplifier awaiting in the Antarctic that will eradicate the human race. Ginrai rips off BlackZarak's cannon and tricked him into hurting himself, but BlackZarak turns it around and buries Ginrai in an avalanche, but Ginrai wasn't down yet: he explodes out of the snow, but BlackZarak unleashes the "Devil Thunder Ring" to strip Ginrai of his humanity, much like with Hydra and Buster, but the timely arrival of Grand, and the autobot-juniors save him and Ginrai again blows BlackZarak's head off, but it still doesn't kill him: instead he morphs into a two-headed snake monster. Even more surprising, when Overlord arrives he outright attacks Devil Z out of betrayal, but Devil Z simply strips them of their masterforce-powers and transectors and kills them, though not before they request Ginrai to stop Devil Z while Overlord becomes a pure transformer. As Ginrai vows to fulfill the godmaster's wish Shūta, Cab and Minerva suddenly find themselves fuse with Ginrai in the same way Devil Z had with BlackZarak. All hell breaks loose as BlackZarak\Devil Z and Ginrai/headmaster-junior trio clash, with Devil Z revealing to be the creator of all godmasters and that they wouldn't be able to defeat him, but Ginrai retorts that Devil Z's overconfidence is what prevents him from exterminating the humans. He manages to shatter BlackZarak's body and together all four of them unleash the final-fire-guts and annihilate Devil Z once and for all. The surviving Decepticons, upon witnessing Devil Z's end, flee to outer space, while for the autobots both the juniors and godmasters suddenly finds their masterforce-bracelets disappear and their transectors become true transformers: with Devil Z gone, the connection between the transectors and their human-users was now broken, then they and Grand bid them farewell as they fly off into space after the remaining Decepticons. The battle was finally over.
43	"Fight! Super Ginrai" (戦え！スーパージンライ)	Unaired
An array of flashbacks of Ginrai's battles.
44	"Bomber Project Announced! Birth of God Ginrai" (ボンバー計画発令！ゴッドジンライ誕生)	Unaired
A look into the birth of Godbomber.
45	"The Secret of Godbomber!" (ゴッドボンバーの秘密！)	Unaired
A look into Godbomber's experiences.
46	"Trading Places! Cybertron Warriors!" (大逆転！ サイバトロン戦士！)	Unaired
47	"You Too Use the Masterforce to Transform" (マスターフォースで君もトランスフォーム)	March 7, 1989

== Chapters ==
No.	Title	Japanese release date	Japanese ISBN
1	Fight! Super Robot Life Form Transformers: The Comics 戦え！超ロボット生命体トランスフォーマー ザ☆コミックス	October 23, 2002	978-4813000938
Chapter 1: "Gods? Devils? Pretenders" (「神か？悪魔か？ プリテンダー」) (March 1988); Chapter 2: "The Birth of the Headmaster Jr." (「ヘッドマスターJr．たんじょう」) (April 1988); Chapter 3: "Destined Showdown - Children of Evil and Justice" (「運命の対決 正義と悪の子どもたち」) (May 1988); Chapter 4: "Appearance! The Savior's Name is Ginrai!" (「登場！ 救世主の名はジンライ！」) (June 1988); Chapter 5: "Burn, Super Soul! New Commander Super Ginrai" (「もやせ、超魂！ 新司令官スーパージンライ！」) (July 1988); Chapter 6: "The Battle Begins! The United Earth-Space Troops" (「戦闘開始！地球・宇宙連合軍」) (August 1988); Chapter 7: "God Ginrai's Amazing Super-God Combination!" (「おどろきのゴッドジンライ超神合体！」) (September 1988); Chapter 8: "Earth Family of Justice and Evil" (「正義と悪の地球ファミリー」) (October 1988); Chapter 9: "The Destrons' Great Counterattack!" (「デストロンの大逆襲！」) (November 1988); Chapter 10: "Live or Die? The Desperate Super-God Combination!" (「生か死か？ 決死の超神合体！」) (December 1988); Chapter 11: "Great Turn-Around! Cybertrons" (「大逆転！ サイバトロン」) (January 1989); Final Chapter: "Birth of Super Life-Forms" (「超生命体のたんじょう」) (February 1989)

Preceded by Zillion (???)	Nippon TV Tuesday 17:00-17:30 Timeframe; Transformers: Super-God Masterforce (April 12, 1988 - March 7, 1989)	Succeeded by Fight! Super Robot Life-Form Transformers Victory (3/14/1989 - 12/19/1989)
