= Katsumi Kishino =

Japanese engineer

Katsumi Kishino is an engineer at Sophia University in Tokyo, Japan. He was named a Fellow of the Institute of Electrical and Electronics Engineers (IEEE) in 2016 for his contributions to III-V light emitter technology.
