= Transformers: Victory =

Japanese anime series

- North American DVD cover, depicting Deathsaurus and Star Saber
- 戦え! 超ロボット生命体 トランスフォーマーV
- Genre: Adventure, mecha, science fiction
- Created by: Masumi Kaneda; Ban Magami
- Developed by: Hiroyuki Hoshiyama
- Directed by: Yoshikata Nitta
- Music by: Katsunori Ishida
- Country of origin: Japan
- Original language: Japanese
- No. of episodes: 32

Production
- Producers: Nobuyuki Okude; Kenji Yokoyama; Tatsuya Yoshida
- Production companies: Takara Co., Ltd.; Toei Animation

Original release
- Network: NNS (NTV)
- Release: March 14 – December 19, 1989

Related
- Manga
- Written by: Masumi Kaneda
- Illustrated by: Ban Magami
- Published by: Kodansha
- Magazine: TV Magazine
- Original run: April 1989 – January 1990
- Volumes: 1

Transformers: Victory (Japanese: トランスフォーマーV(ビクトリー), Hepburn: Toransufōmā V) is an animated series produced by Toei Animation. It is a Japanese-produced spin-off of the well-known original Transformers animated series, and the final complete animated series from the original "Generation 1" era.

== Premise ==
Victory follows the new Autobot Supreme Commander, Star Saber, defending the Earth against the Decepticons' new Emperor of Destruction. Deszaras (or referred to in the west as "Deathsaurus") desires the planet's energy to reactivate his massive planet-destroying fortress, sealed away in the Dark Nebula long ago by Star Saber. The series eschews the story arc-based approach of Headmasters and Masterforce, returning to the American show's method of episodic adventures that did little to alter the status quo of the series, with a heavy emphasis on action, complemented by dynamic animation. Its cast consists almost entirely of brand new characters (although there are some guest appearances from characters on earlier shows).

Victory's story is told over thirty-two original episodes. However, the broadcast series also includes six additional clip shows - bringing the total number of broadcast episodes to thirty-eight. Additionally, after the end of the series, another six additional clip shows were created by Masumi Kaneda, which were available only through home video and seldom-seen regional Japanese broadcasts, taking the total number of Victory episodes to forty-four.

== Episodes ==
No.	Title	Original release date
1	"The Brave Hero of the Universe - Star Saber" (宇宙の勇者・スターセイバー)	March 14, 1989
The Decepticons having been driven from Earth by the Autobots under Ginrai, the Autobots and others form the Galactic Peace Alliance to counter them and other threats to the safety of the universe. The leader of this organization is the new Autobot Supreme Commander, Star Saber, who takes over as commander of the Autobot force protecting Earth. As Ginrai leaves shortly before Star Saber is due to arrive, Earth's Lunar Station is attacked by the Dinoforce, Decepticons loyal to the new Emperor of Destruction Deszaras. The Autobot Brainmasters arrive to challenge them, but are soon overwhelmed due to the foe's superior numbers. Dashtacker and Machtackle of the Multiforce then arrive to help evacuate the human civilians, while Star Saber is intercepted en route to Earth by Deszaras, and the two are indicated to have a history. They briefly clash, but Star Saber then leaves after receiving a message from the young human Jan Minakaze, who is at the Autobot command space station with his friend Stakeout. Arriving on the moon, Star Saber easily handles the Dinoforce single-handed while the rest of the Autobots supervise the evacuation of the Lunar Station. Deszaras then arrives to continue their duel, but soon departs with his forces after being defeated by Star Saber. Star Saber is then reunited with Jan, and expresses his determination not to let the Decepticons harm Earth.
2	"Surprise Attack! Dinoking" (奇襲！ダイノキング)	March 28, 1989
Determined to protect the Earth, Star Saber prepares to relocate his team, and summons Wingwaver-leader of the Multiforce-to join his forces. Meanwhile, aboard the Decepticon ship Thunder Arrow, Deszaras is attended by Goryu of the Dinoforce and Leozack of the Breast Force, and the latter soon dispatches the former and his team to attack the Autobots' Galaxy Shuttle Base. The Dinoforce intercept Wingwaver on his way to Earth and attack, prompting Star Saber to dispatch the Brainmasters to rescue him; after a pitched battle the Dinoforce robots combine into Dinoking while sending their Pretender shells to attack the Galaxy Shuttle Base. They attack in force after Star Saber departs to aid the Brainmasters, and badly damage the station only to be driven off by the Multiforce and Galaxy Shuttle. Star Saber succeeds in defeating Dinoking, whose components flee to re-join Deathsaurus, and the Autobots then make their way to Earth.
3	"Attack! Leozack" (襲撃！レオザック)	April 4, 1989
Leozack arrives on Earth and enters the Thunder Arrow, which Deszaras has hidden underwater to avoid Autobot detection, and announces his intention to destroy Star Saber on his leader's behalf. Meanwhile, Star Saber and Stakeout take Jan to his first day of school, where Star Saber explains that he is Jan's foster father, having taken him in after rescuing him from the wreckage of a science vessel that carried his late parents and was attacked by the Dinoforce. Jan is soon the center of attention among his new classmates, including a friendly girl named Illumina, but the school is then attacked by Leozack and the Dinoforce. Despite his skill and overconfidence, Leozack proves to be no match for Star Saber, but he and the Dinoforce manage to gang up on the Autobot leader. The other Brainmasters arrive to turn the tide, forming Road Caesar to counter the threat of Dinoking and enabling Jan to pilot Star Saber's V-Star, a combination aircraft/transforming set of armor, to aid his foster father in driving off Leozack. The students, some of whom previously blamed Jan for the Decepticon attack, welcome him as a new friend and soon enjoy a ride on a stakeout.
4	"Unite!! Multiforce" (合体！！マルチ戦隊)	April 11, 1989
While the Multiforce teach Jan the principle of using a lever to move heavy objects, the Decepticons are joined by new recruits: Leozack's comrades Killbison, Jaruga, and Drillhorn. They soon orchestrate a plan to seize an Earth energy plant in order to provide their war efforts with greater power, dispatching the Dinoforce to seize the facility while the four Breast Force members lie in wait for the Autobots. The Multiforce is sent out on patrol by Star Saber, but Wingwaver is persuaded by Jan to take him on a ride that leads to his accompanying the Multiforce when they travel to the plant to save the humans. The Multiforce battle the Dinoforce while Jan aids several plant workers, who use the lever system to save an injured and trapped comrade. The Multiforce forms Landcross in order to battle Dinoking, while Star Saber and the other Brainmasters arrive to battle the Breast Force, with Star Saber taking over for Landcross in battling Dinoking. The Decepticons are soon driven off and the workers saved, and while Star Saber reproves Landcross-and thus his components-for failing to report the situation to him immediately, he encourages them to learn from the experience and move forward as a team.
5	"Move Out! Rescue Team" (出勤！レスキュー部隊)	April 18, 1989
While the Dinoforce members amuse themselves on a deserted island, they are approached by Leozack, who soon recruits them for a mission. Meanwhile, Jan and Stakeout show Illumina around the Autobot base, and then greet Stakeout's fellow Autobot Rescue Team members: fire truck Red Hot, ambulance Fix It, and rescue boat Seawatch, who operate under Stakeout's leadership. Illumina then departs to go to an island amusement park with some other friends, unaware that it has been targeted by Leozack and the Dinoforce. Leozack then reveals to Goryu that he intends to one day replace Deszaras as leader of the Decepticons, and seeks to make the park into a base for himself while offering the Dinoforce leader the position of general when he leads, though Goryu is skeptical. The attack soon draws in the Autobots, with the Brainmasters, Jan, and the Rescue Team moving in to evacuate civilians and challenge the Decepticons. Star Saber engages Leozack in his standard form to minimize the risk to human bystanders, but finds the Breast Force leader a formidable opponent. The Rescue Team and Jan succeed in rescuing all the civilians, including Illumina, while the Dinoforce and other Brainmasters battle in their combined forms of Dinoking and Road Caesar. With his V-Star no longer needed to evacuate civilians, Star Saber dons it as armor and defeats Leozack, who retreats injured and in shame and soon finds himself making excuses to an unamused Deszaras.
6	"Infiltration...Uranium Mine" (潜入…ウラン鉱山)	April 25, 1989
Deszaras sets his sights on a uranium mine in Africa in order to produce more energy for the Decepticons, and dispatches his minions under the leadership of Leozack. The mine's workers, including a man whose young son is celebrating a birthday that day, are soon being terrorized by the Decepticons, who trap roughly a hundred of them in the mine as hostages. The Autobots are soon alerted, and the team of Braver, Wingwaver, and Laster are assigned to infiltrate the mines through abandoned works using a drill created by Laster. The Multiforce are left dissatisfied with Blacker's treatment of them as children, while the mine workers are in increasing danger of suffocating below ground. Laster's team soon runs into a seemingly impenetrable barrier of bedrock, and use their own power to increase the drill's energy while the head of the mining operation prepares to aid them by setting explosives. Outside the mine, the other Autobots are awaiting their opportunity to join the battle, while the mine chief evades Leozack and communicates his plan to Laster's team, who agree to proceed despite Wingwaver's objections. The combined Autobot-human effort shatters the bedrock, allowing the Autobots to reach the hostages and face Drillhorn and the other Breast Force members, who are guarding them. Galaxy Shuttle is then dispatched to carry the miners to safety, and Wingwaver is unexpectedly congratulated for his efforts by Blacker, who then departs with Star Saber to stop the Decepticons from making off with the uranium. The pair engage Leozack and the Dinoforce, with Star Saber using his V-Star to drive off the former before armoring up to take on Dinoking. The defeated Decepticons soon return to their furious leader, while the Autobots celebrate with the miners-without whom they would not have won the day-and their families.
7	"Explosion!! Energy Base" (爆破！！エネルギー基地)	May 9, 1989
The Decepticons land the Thunder Arrow at a secluded energy station in the middle of a jungle, where they begin producing Energon for the facility. Leozack, quite pleased with his accomplishment, is reminded by Desaras that they require a huge amount of Energon for their goal: to free Deszaras' fortress from the Dark Nebula where Star Saber sealed it away. Learning of the Decepticons' activities, Star Saber dispatches the Multiforce under the command of Blacker, who earns Wingwaver's ire by insisting on referring to him as "kid." Wingwaver's frustrated outburst leads to the Autobots being discovered by members of the Dinforoce, and efforts to contact Star Saber are thwarted by Decepticon jamming. Blacker quickly orders the members of Multiforce to flee the area and contact the other Autobots while he draws the Decepticons away, having pinpointed the location of the base. Worried about his overdue unit, Star Saber flies out to investigate, while Wingwaver sends his teammates on ahead to Galaxy Shuttle while he returns to help Blacker. He manages to save Blacker from the Dinoforce members but is then surprised when his superior leads him away from the energy base, drawing the Decepticons after them. Star Saber arrives and realizes that Blacker is acting as a diversion, and moves into the base to confront Leozack and the remaining members of the Dinoforce. The Autobots succeed in defeating the Decepticons, who are forced to retreat with what energy they have already managed to seize, while Blacker takes responsibility for Wingwaver's carelessness-something that doesn't fool Star Saber.
8	"Big City - Underground Terror" (大都会・地下の恐怖)	May 16, 1989
Deszaras dispatches Leozack and the other Breast Force members to an American city with a subway network in a bid to harvest its electrical energy, and the Autobots quickly move in to investigate. The Decepticons' behavior is initially baffling, but the Autobots quickly realize their reasoning: the Autobots are limited in the close quarters of the subway tunnels, while the Decepticons can call upon their Breast Animals to strike at the hampered enemy. Star Saber then finds Deszaras himself at the subway power station, and is faced with the same limitations as his subordinates in facing his nemesis. However, the Autobots are able to overcome the Decepticons despite their restrictions, and the Rescue Team is able to rescue all the humans endangered by the villainous plot. During his battle with Deszaras, Star Saber learns that his nemesis is weakened when his Breast Animals are separated for him, and succeeds in injuring him badly enough that Deszaras flees with only a fraction of the energy he had hoped to collect.
9	"Clash!! Two Great Heroes" (激突！！二大英雄)	May 23, 1989
A clip show recounting highlights of the series thus far.
10	"The New Warrior - Hellbat" (新兵士・ヘルバット)	May 30, 1989
Leozack promises Deszaras that he will obtain valuable information to aid the Decepticon cause, while another of his Breast Force teammates, Hellbat, has arrived on Earth and has infiltrated an energy research installation. Having been discovered, he flees while demonstrating his hypnosis abilities against the human and Autobot security forces, putting them to sleep. Meanwhile, Braver is working on a device that can detect Decepticon brainwaves, with the hopes that he can create enough to track Decepticon movements. He finishes his machine while the Breast Force reunites, and the Autobots quickly move to engage Hellbat after learning of his efforts. While the Autobots search for their foes, Jan learns that the head of the facility was a close friend of his late father. The Autobots soon engage the Breast Force, and Hellbat's hypnosis proves to be a formidable obstacle despite their resourcefulness. However, Braver is able to convert his device to produce energy waves that interfere with Decepticon brainwaves, turning the tide, though Leozack manages to steal the device. It proves to be useless except against Decepticons, and Deszaras has it destroyed after briefly punishing Leozack with it.
11	"Attack the Shuttle Base!!" (シャトル基地を狙え！！)	June 6, 1989
Hellbat meets with Deszaras to introduce himself, and informs him of an operation to transport a load of energy into space using a space shuttle being launched from a port that the Decepticons have attacked previously. Deszaras soon dispatches Leozack and Hellbat to attack, with the former being angered by his subordinate going over his head with the information. Dashtacker and Machtackle, sent to safeguard the launch, are then attacked by the two Decepticons and their arriving comrades Killbison and Drillhorn. Having received a distress call from the pair, Star Saber dispatches the team-with the exception of Jan, Stakeout, Seawatch, and Blacker and Braver who are escorting a tanker-to aid them. Leozack attempts to seize the shuttle, but the rest of the Autobots then arrive in force, prompting Hellbat to suggest that he take the energy in a container under his own power while the others keep the Autobots pinned. They are successful, but Star Saber then intercepts the flying Decepticons in the air, leading to a dogfight between him and Hellbat. Star Saber is able to recover the stolen energy, and defeats both Decepticons forcing them to retreat, though Hellbat begins scheming to use the failure to improve his own standing and lessen Leozack's in the eyes of Deszaras.
12	"Tanker Robbing Operation" (タンカー強奪作戦)	June 13, 1989
Frustrated with his failure thus far to obtain the energy needed to recover his fortress from the Dark Nebula, Deszaras becomes angered with his troops until Drillhorn suggests seizing an oil tanker. An entire major city is then left without gasoline, prompting Star Saber to dispatch the Brainmasters to investigate and determine if the Decepticons are involved. The culprit proves to be Drillhorn, using his digging abilities to drain underground gas tanks, with Jaruga serving as his backup; Blacker's discovery of this leads to a brief confrontation that ends in the Decepticons escaping. The mayor of the city then requests an emergency gas shipment, unaware that he is playing into the Decepticons' hands; the Decepticons then contact him warning him not to allow anyone near the tanker unless he wants the city to be destroyed. The Dinoforce then appear in the city, and Blacker soon learns that they have planted a neutron bomb in the city; the mayor is soon advised by Star Saber to evacuate the city. The Autobots' search for the bomb proves futile, and the tanker carrying the gasoline soon arrives in port and is boarded by the Breast Force shortly before Thunder Arrow emerges from the sea and begins drawing the tanker inside. Leozack threatens the crew of the ship in hopes of luring the Autobots into the open, unaware that Blacker is eavesdropping and learns from his gloating where the bomb is hidden. He soon alerts the other Autobots only for them to be intercepted by the Dinoforce, whom Star Saber and Laster engage while Braver goes after the bomb. Blacker arrives to back them up, and the three Autobots soon find themselves locked in battle with Dinoking only for Star Saber to be forced to depart to save the tanker. Star Saber single-handedly defeats the Breast Force and forces the Thunder Arrow to withdraw, while Dinoking is beaten by Blacker and Laster as Braver disassembles the bomb.
13	"Move Out!! Breastforce" (出撃！！ブレストフォース)	June 27, 1989
A clip show recounting the activities of the Breast Force.
14	"Rescue Jean!!" (ジャンを救出せよ！！)	July 4, 1989
The Breast Force-minus Hellbat-attack a convoy of tankers, one of which was discovered to be carrying fuel by the absent Decepticon. The Brainmasters and Galaxy Shuttle depart to confront them, unaware that Hellbat is attempting to infiltrate the base and steal information. Failing to acquire anything but a "coded disk"-Jan's homework program-he then captures Jan and Stakeout to force the Multifirce and the returning Galaxy Shuttle to let him go. He attempts to interrogate the pair, but they escape and summon a Star Saber. Dinoking engages the Autobot leader and loses, fleeing when Galaxy Shuttle arrives, and the Decepticons are thwarted yet again.
15	"Mach and Tackle" (マッハとタックル)	July 18, 1989
A large sinkhole opens up in Canada, and Star Saber sends Machtackle to investigate. Guided by a local farmer, he examines the hole and splits into Mach and Tackle, who determine the cause to be the cutoff of local underground water. It turns out to be a Decepticon plot involving a disguised factory, and the other Autobots are quickly called in to aid the beleaguered pair. Tackle tries serving as the upper body in combination with Mach but fares poorly, though his tactics enable the Autobots to drive off the Decepticons. The sinkhole soon becomes a lake, and Mach and Tackle celebrate their partnership.
16	"Fierce Battle!! Asteroid" (激戦！！アステロイド)	July 25, 1989
An area of the asteroid belt becomes a veritable Bermuda Triangle in space, with various spacecraft disappearing once they enter it. Seeking to investigate it, Star Saber has the Autobots build him a ship that will conceal his vehicle mode and V-Star, though Jan is concerned that he's traveling into a suspected Decepticon trap by himself. He soon discovers that the Decepticons have been capturing ships in order to drain their energy and break them apart for use in creating a powerful alloy, putting the human crews to work in their efforts. Star Saber soon infiltrates the facility and, after alerting the humans to his presence, sends a coded signal to the Autobots before engaging the Breast Force and Dinoforce. He quickly takes out the devices they've been using to trap ships, and with the help of the arriving Autobots forces Deszaras to depart in the Thunder Arrow, leaving his minions to make their own escape.
17	"Planet Micro - The Mysterious Warrior" (マイクロ星・謎の戦士)	August 1, 1989
A crisis on the planet Micro, home planet of the Rescue Team, prompts Star Saber to travel there at the request of Ginrai, who is in charge of the sector but occupied battling the Decepticons under Overlord. Jan soon learns that Stakeout has a girlfriend on the planet, Clipper, and delights in making fun of him along with the rest of the Rescue Team. The culprits behind recent devastating attacks are revealed to be Hellbat, operating separately from the rest of the Breast Force, and the Decepticon mercenaries Black Shadow and Blue Bacchus. However, Star Saber soon learns that another Autobot, the Six-Changer Greatshot, is after the trio, and the pair eventually confront them at the planet's vital plasma energy reactor. Greatshot eventually manages to overpower Black Shadow and Blue Bacchus, who are former comrades of his shocked to learn that he's joined the Autobots, while Hellbat damages the reactor in an effort to make it explode and destroy Star Saber while he escapes. Star Saber is able to get the reactor off planet before it explodes, and soon bids farewell to Greatshot, who apparently joined the Autobots after fighting alongside Star Saber.
18	"Rescue! Gaihawk" (奪還！ガイホーク)	August 8, 1989
Leozack, furious with Hellbat's recent rogue action but placated by the other's suggestion that they prepare for Deszaras' eventual overthrow, decides that it's time they accomplish their true purpose for coming to Micro: infiltrating the planet's prison moon to rescue Gaihawk, another member of the Breast Force. Using a decoy shuttle, they manage to penetrate the facility, while Gaihawk uses their disturbance to escape from his cell. After sending the other inmates to attack the arriving Autobots, he coerces Hellbat into helping him recharge his energy and recover his Chest Animal. He is then confronted by Greatshot, called in by Star Saber due to his familiarity with the prison, and the pair face off while Star Saber and his team engage the Breast Force and several of the prisoners, though the latter soon accept the invitation to board Galaxy Shuttle when the prison begins to sink into the lava that covers the planet. Greatshot ends up falling into the prison refinery but is aided by Stakeout, and the pair manage to make their escape after Gaihawk flees. The remaining Breast Force members depart as well, with Leozack and Hellbat transporting their flightless comrades, while the Autobots return to Micro with a new friendship formed between Greatshot and Stakeout.
19	"Unite! Liokaiser" (合体！ライオカイザー)	August 15, 1989
Leozack welcomes Gaihawk back into the ranks of Breast Force, and expresses his eagerness to have a group of six, though he intends to replace Hellbat with an incoming veteran named Deathcobra. Unbeknownst to him, Hellbat is eavesdropping, and is so upset by the idea of being expelled that he leaves to intercept Deathcobra, unknowingly attracting the attention of a patrolling Stakeout, Jan, and Clipper. He soon meets with Deathcobra and begs him not to replace him, but the other Decepticon is uninterested in his dilemma; in desperation Hellbat draws his weapon and inadvertently gets into a firefight with Deathcobra that results in the other Decepticon being shot twice, the second blast proving fatal. Stunned at his actions, Hellbat realizes that he has to do something, and is inspired by the arriving Autobots. Returning to the Breast Force, he informs them of Deathcobra's demise and blames it on the Autobots, prompting the entire group to investigate. They find the pair of Micromasters and Jan and quickly attack, and become further enraged when Star Saber arrives; Gaihawk in particular wishes to avenge his imprisonment, which he blames on the Autobot commander. The reason for Leozack's efforts to assemble a team of six is then revealed: six members of the Breast Force have the ability to combine into Liokaiser. The new Combiner proves more than a match even for Star Saber, who is only saved from destruction by the unexpected return of Ginrai. Though no more a match for Liokaiser than Star Saber, Ginrai is able to give Star Saber a chance to recover, and between the two Autobot warriors Liokaiser is separated, prompting the Breast Force to withdraw. The Autobots are then left to return to Earth and face the problem of the Decepticons' latest weapon.
20	"Assemble! Warrior Combiner" (勢揃い！合体戦士)	August 22, 1989
The third clip show.
21	"Resurrection!? The Destron Fortress" (復活！？デストロン要塞)	August 29, 1989
As the Autobots depart Micro, Deszaras and the Dinoforce take Thunder Arrow into the Dark Nebula, where they use the Energon they've collected thus far to power up the fortress. Though they've failed to collect enough to free it from the nebula, Deszaras pleased that it is still functional and looks forward to freeing it. He then recalls the battle in which his fortress was attacked by the younger Star Saber and a massive Autobot attack force, who used powerful engines to siphon the fortress' power and move it into the nebula, trapping it in a gravity pocket. Detecting Star Saber and Galaxy Shuttle passing, Deszaras leads an immediate attack on the Autobots, dueling Star Saber while the Dinoforce attempt to board Galaxy Shuttle. Despite his skill, Star Saber is caught off guard by Deszaras' sheer ferocity and his new weapon, the Living Metal Destroyer Cannon. The Rescue Team and Jean manage to repel Dinoforce and turn their effort to destroy or damage Galaxy Shuttle into an attack that damages Thunder Arrow. Deszaras then runs low on energy, having expended so much to reactivate the fortress, and is unable to finish off the badly damaged Star Saber, whom he leaves with the warning that he shall perish on their next meeting. He then leaves to attend to Thunder Arrow while the battered Autobots make their way home, wary of Desaras' growing ambition.
22	"Battle Up of Anger!!" (怒りのバトルアップ！！)	Unaired
The Autobots visit the Schaeffer Energy Plant, a joint Galactic Defense Force facility that produces the powerful Schaeffer energy for use by Autobots and humans. Jan, however, is troubled by the recent emergence of Liokaiser and Star Saber's near demise at his hands in their previous battle on Planet Micro. Deszaras welcomes the now complete Breast Force aboard the repaired Thunder Arrow, and soon dispatches them to the Schaeffer Energy Plant after being informed of it by Hellbat. The attack soon draws the Autobots, and Star Saber engages the Breast Force while Jan and the Rescue Team help civilians and the Brainmasters infiltrate the facility. They fail to stop the Dinoforce from stealing the plant's energy, and Star Saber is soon confronted by Liokaiser once again and left unable to fight when a tower is damaged and must be supported while the evacuation continues. The Brainmasters arrive on the scene and form Road Caesar, but prove to be little match for Liokaiser; the evacuation is completed and Star Saber is able to let the tower fall safely before engaging Liokaiser himself. He manages to unleash a powerful attack that stuns the Decepticon Combiner, but Desaras-his objectives accomplished-recalls Liokaiser, ending the battle prematurely. The Autobots are left with mixed results, but choose to focus on the lives saved rather than the energy lost to the enemy.
23	"Fight to the Death!! Antarctic Battle" (死闘！！南極の攻防戦)	September 5, 1989
The Decepticons' efforts to harvest energy from the Antarctic result in South American sea levels rising, flooding seaside villages that the Autobots work to evacuate. Star Saber dispatches the Multiforce to evacuate, while the Autobots learn that the father of one of Jan's classmates is at a United Nations base in the Antarctic, and he and Jan accompany the Rescue Team aboard Galaxy Shuttle to see if they can rescue him. The Multiforce find the stranded scientists only to be attacked by the Breast Force, and the two teams soon engage in battle as Landcross and Liokaiser. Liokaiser soon unveils the new ability to become invisible, which proves devastatingly effective against Landcross. Star Saber and Galaxy Shuttle soon arrive to provide help, while the Rescue Team goes after the scientists stranded on an iceberg. Liokaiser's invisibility continues to be a problem, allowing him to wound Galaxy Shuttle and fight Star Saber to a standstill, at which point Desaras intervenes to face off with his nemesis. The two are soon locked in an epic clash, during which Galaxy Shuttle manages to strike at the Decepticons' drill. With their energy-gathering machine destroyed, the Decepticons depart, leaving the Autobots to contemplate their future war effort.
24	"Crisis! Desert Ambush" (危機！砂漠の待ち伏せ)	September 12, 1989
The Decepticons strike at a desert energy plant, and the Brainmasters are dispatched to investigate given the Multiforce still being damaged from the events of the previous episode. The Dinoforce have captured an oil refinery in the middle of the desert, and the Brainmaster and Rescue Team fly in on Galaxy Shuttle to reclaim the facility and rescue the workers. However, the Breast Force has laid a trap for the heroes, shooting down Galaxy Shuttle and attacking the Brainmasters aggressively while the Rescue Team perform their part of the mission. Laster and Braver end up caught in the sand, and Blacker's efforts to rescue them result in him being attacked by Gaihawk. Greatshot, who arrived on Earth earlier in the episode looking for some rest and relaxation only to spot the Thunder Arrow, intervenes in time to save Blacker, only for the Thunder Arrow to emerge from beneath the sand and for Deszaras to attack him. Star Saber arrives in time to confront his nemesis while Greatshot faces off with the Breast Force, proving a match for his six opponents despite his injuries. Blacker, who was severely injured by the Decepticons, is taken back to Galaxy Shuttle by Laster and Braver, who then set their sights on stopping the Dinoforce from capturing the energy from the refinery. The Autobots manage to damage the Thunder Arrow, forcing the Decepticons to retreat, and Braver and Laster are able to drive off the Dinoforce without them getting a hold of any energy.
25	"A Deadly Battle Bet" (死を賭けた激闘)	September 19, 1989
The fourth clip show.
26	"Ginrai Dies!!" (ジンライ死す！！)	September 26, 1989
An attempt by Deszaras to ambush and finish off Star Saber results in Ginrai, who intervenes at the last moment, being badly wounded, while Star Saber and Blacker are likewise left injured. With several of their most powerful Autobot opponents out of commission, Deszaras and his forces press their advantage and attack two energy facilities at once, easily decimating the pitifully inadequate human defense forces. Unable to stand by, Star Saber insists on going into battle despite his wounds, taking Laster and Braver with him as backup to engage Deszaras and the Breast Force at a solar energy station. Meanwhile, Dashtacker and Machtackle are battling the Dinoforce at another facility, and Blacker insists on accompanying Wingwaver and the Rescue Team there to back them up despite his own injuries. Ginrai, meanwhile, is in critical condition and being examined by Minerva, Perceptor, and Wheeljack (despite the latter's demise in The Transformers: The Movie which initially wasn't released in Japan until 1989), and starts to lose hope that he will ever be able to fight for the Autobot cause again. However, the trio of doctors eventually inform him-despite Perceptor's reluctance-that there may be a way he can rejoin the battle, but it will involve him being entirely reconstructed. Determined to take this path, Ginrai calls the weakened Star Saber back from the field, and then explains his intention to undergo the procedure and be reborn as a power up for Star Saber. Star Saber refuses to allow it, but Ginrai refuses to be deterred. The Decepticons' energy thefts prove successful and the Autobots are left beaten and demoralized, but then bear witness as Ginrai's transformation begins.
27	"Fight!! Victory Leo" (戦え！！ビクトリーレオ)	September 26, 1989
Ginrai's procedure is completed and he is reborn in the new form of Victory Leo, a powerful Triple-Changer warrior intended to combine with Star Saber in battle. Despite fears that Ginrai would be entirely lost he recognizes Jan and Stakeout, but is soon overcome by his new powers and transforms into robot lion mode, in which form he tears around the Autobot base before entering the medical bay where Star Saber's injuries are being treated. Star Saber is able to halt the fierce Transformer, though all the Autobots remain fearful of his unpredictable nature. Hellbat soon advises Deszaras of a large vehicle transporting energy to a facility in America, and the Dinoforce, Hellbat, and Leozack move to intercept it. The Multiforce, Braver, and Laster move to challenge them but are quickly outmatched by the Breast Force members and Dinoking. Unexpectedly, Victory Leo volunteers to go to their aid, and swiftly challenges the enemy forces menacing the Brainmaster duo and Landcross. Though he succeeds in defeating the Decepticons, Star Saber fears that has only raw ferocity serving as his motivation; Ginrai's innate goodness is dormant within him. Star Saber then summons Greatshot and requests that he take over Ginrai's position as commander of the Autobots' Sector 2 force while the Autobots await their friend's full return.
28	"Desperate Situation!! Cybertron" (絶体絶命！！サイバトロン)	Unaired
The fifth clip show.
29	"Awaken! Victory Leo" (めざめよ！ビクトリーレオ)	October 3, 1989
Victory Leo continues to fight with only the destruction of the Decepticons in mind, showing little to no regard for his comrades. With this in mind, Star Saber-who is undergoing final repairs and the modifications that will allow him to unite with Victory Leo in battle-dispatches the mighty Autobot on a mission with Stakeout and Jan going along for the ride. Victory Leo soon encounters Gaihawk, who in his overconfidence faces him only to be easily taken down. Meanwhile, the rest of the Breast Force move in to attack a geothermal energy plant in Japan, but are soon surprised by the Autobots' arrival. Victory Leo engages Leozack and Jaruga, paying little mind to the other Decepticons or his two comrades, who are soon trapped within the base while the members of the Breast Force steal energy. Back at Galaxy Shuttle Base, Star Saber is worried when he is unable to contact the field team, but denies Wingwaver's request to go to their aid, citing his assurance that Ginrai's spirit will soon awaken inside of his new form of Victory Leo. His hopes ring true as Jan's desperate cries for help awaken the heroic Ginrai within Victory Leo, who soon goes to Jan and Stakeout's aid after defeating the Breast Force duo he had been fighting. With his repairs complete, Star Saber looks forward to fighting alongside Victory Leo in the battle against the Decepticons.
30	"Turnaround! Deadly Victory Unity" (逆転！必殺のビクトリー合体)	October 17, 1989
The Multiforce and Rescue Team respond to an emergency dispatch from Star Saber only to witness a horrible sight: Deszaras unleashing a new missile capable of splitting and hitting four targets simultaneously, causing widespread damage. While the Autobots move to aid the affected areas, they learn that they cannot interfere with the Decepticons without risking the launch of additional missiles that could devastate Earth's entire surface and wipe out humanity. The Brainmasters are swiftly dispatched to alert Victory Leo after he attacks the Decepticons during their raid on an oil refinery. Star Saber quickly determines that the only way to reach the missile-launching satellite before additional missiles can be fired is for him and Victory Leo to combine, which will increase their maximum flight speed. Despite Perceptor's objections, Star Saber is determined to press forward, and after preventing Victory Leo from engaging the Decepticons again the two combine in vehicle mode and take off. This allows the Brainmasters to engage the Dinoforce and Leozack and prevent them from stealing energy, while Deszaras is stunned by Victory Saber's rapid arrival and driven away by the power of the new Combiner in robot mode. Victory Saber destroys the satellite, leaving the Decepticons unable to hold Earth hostage.
31	"Defend the School!!" (ジャン・学校を守れ！！)	October 31, 1989
Deszaras vents his frustration on his troops, especially Leozack, for their recent failure, prompting Goryu to lead the Dinoforce on an operation that he conceived of. Jan, meanwhile, completes work on a transforming vehicle that he created with Stakeout and Laster's help, and takes it to the first day of his new school year, picking up Illumina on the way. He is quick to show off his new vehicle, only for it to be spotted by the Dinoforce, who soon launch an attack on the school forcing Jan to confront them. Learning of the situation Star Saber-who was in space bidding farewell to a departing Perceptor-flies towards the school with plans to rendezvous with Victory Leo, while the Dinoforce members begin pursuing Jan's vehicle with him and several of his friends inside. The two Autobots arrive to find the children at Goryu's mercy, and the Dinoforce begin bombarding Star Saber and Victory Leo until Jan unleashes a smokescreen enabling him to get his vehicle and friends to safety. Dinoking and Victory Saber are soon formed and face off, with Dinoking unveiling a new weapon: the Dino Blaster Cannon. However, Victory Saber's power proves too great for him, and he is forced to separate; Goryu then surprises Victory Saber by offering his own life in exchange for Victory Saber sparing the rest of the Dinoforce, only for them to offer themselves up in exchange for their leader. Victory Saber is moved by the display of loyalty among the Dinoforce, and allows them to depart in peace. Illumina then admits to Jan that she's quite impressed by him, and he then surprises her by asking if he can name his new vehicle after her; when she agrees, he reveals that he anticipated her acceptance and already painted the vehicle's new name on it, dubbing it "Illumina II."
32	"Mysterious?! The Base Explosion Trap" (謎？！基地爆破の罠)	November 7, 1989
Deszaras' growing temper leaves Leozack flustered while the Autobots search for signs of Decepticon activity while Star Saber departs to visit Galactic Defense Headquarters for a conference. The Rescue Team and Jan are soon put to work on custodial duties, only to be surprised by the inexplicable return of Star Saber, who informs them that Desaras intends to attack the base using explosives. However, Jan soon notes that he is acting strangely, and Victory Leo also notes that Star Saber doesn't seem to be himself while explosives begin to go off around the base. Victory Leo suggests that Star Saber may be an impostor, though Blacker and the others don't believe his theory. Star Saber then orders Stakeout and Jan to investigate the locked room where the information on the Victory Saber combination is kept, and takes custody of the Unification Manual and Jan when a fire breaks out due to another explosion. He soon passes Jan on to Victory Leo who then delivers him to Fixit before confronting Star Saber; before he can share his suspicions, however, a recording of Hellbat threatens to destroy the base unless Star Saber comes alone to the Incan ruins. Star Saber asks Victory Leo to accompany him covertly, and the other Autobots evacuate the base as a precaution; the Breast Force soon prove to be lying in wait for Victory Leo, but stop when he uses Star Saber as a shield. The Brainmasters arrive to help, and Star Saber tries to convince the Brainmasters that Victory Leo has betrayed them. However, Victory Leo's fears are soon justified, as the true Star Saber returns and combines with Victory Leo to face his impostor, who is revealed to be none other than Leozack in disguise. The Breast Force soon combine into Liokaiser and face off with Victory Saber, but Victory Saber proves more formidable than anticipated and Liokaiser flees. The Autobots soon apologize for doubting Victory Leo, and Star Saber reveals that the room containing the Unification Manual was booby-trapped to alert him in the event that it was opened, which was what brought him back to Earth.
33	"The Death-Bringing Space Insects!!" (死を呼ぶ宇宙昆虫！！)	November 14, 1989
While investigating an alien planet, Hellbat comes across the Dorya insects, ravenous alien bugs that aggressively attack Transformers. After breeding more of them, the Decepticons lure Star Saber into a trap and unleash the swarm on him, eager to finish off their foe once and for all. The other Autobots, receiving no word from their commander, swiftly mobilize to find out what has become of him, and soon find him at the mercy of their foes. The Brainmasters and Victory Leo attempt to break the energy barrier trapping Star Saber but are driven off, but not before discovering that Jean's Illumina II mech is the only thing that can penetrate the barrier, which is designed to repel living Cybertronian metal but not ordinary metal. Jean and Victory Leo penetrate the barrier, but the Dorya prove uninterested in the Illumina II. Hellbat unleashes more Dorya on the Brainmasters, while Star Saber and Victory Leo find that the Dorya are vulnerable to intense cold. Jan then attacks the barrier generator alone due to his comrades being trapped, and manages to bring it down and free Star Saber and Victory Leo, who combine into Victory Saber and drive off the Breast Force before engaging Desaras. The Decepticon Emperor is forced to retreat along with the defeated Breast Force, while Jan is praised for his courage in facing the enemy.
34	"The Strongest! Victory Saber" (最強！ビクトリーセイバー)	November 21, 1989
Another clip show (the 6th one by this point), emphasizing the rise of Victory Saber.
35	"Terror of the Giant Tsuanami" (巨大津波の恐怖)	November 28, 1989
With Deszaras' frustration mounting, the Decepticons embark upon a scheme suggested by Hellbat: plundering an energy stockpile hidden in the sunken city of Atlantis. They raise the ancient metropolis and begin stealing the energy, while the act of raising Atlantis to the surface unleashes a powerful tidal wave that sinks a cruise ship and floods a coastal city. The Autobots quickly move into action to aid the beleaguered citizens, only for the Breast Force to attack. Victory Saber soon forms to battle Liokaiser, who proves to be no match for the combined form of the Autobot commander and Victory Leo. However, Deszaras soon collects all the energy he desires and departs, collecting Liokaiser as a second tsunami washes over Atlantis, sweeping away the Dinoforce before striking the city and causing even more destruction. The Autobots survive and evacuate the populace, but now face the grim realization that Desaras has collected enough Energon to revive his fortress.
36	"The Wrath of the Resurrected Giant Fortress!" (巨大要塞怒りの復活！)	December 5, 1989
Deszaras and the Breast Force pilot the Thunder Arrow into the Dark Nebula, where they use their amassed Energon to power up Deszaras' fortress, which they then begin piloting towards Earth. Star Saber dispatches the Brainmasters aboard Galaxy Shuttle to face the ship, calling upon Greatshot to join them. Meanwhile, the abandoned Dinoforce launch an attack to gather energy for Deszaras, only to be engaged by Star Saber and Victory Leo and handily defeated. The Brainmasters form Road Caesar to engage the fortress, but even with Greatshot's help they are woefully outmatched as Deszaras unleashes the fortress' weaponry, including a barrage of asteroids that crash into Earth's surface and cause widespread devastation, with the Dinoforce being caught in the attack. Star Saber orders the Rescue Team to treat an injured Goryu while he and Victory Leo head into space in an effort to stop the fortress, while a concerned Jan heads to his school to make sure that Illumina and their classmates are okay. The school proves to have been left untouched by Deszaras' attack, but Victory Saber's efforts to stop the fortress prove fruitless, leaving Earth apparently at Deszaras' mercy.
37	"Clash! Fortress vs Victory Unity" (激突！要塞vsビクトリー合体)	December 12, 1989
With victory in his grasp, Deszaras transforms his fortress into a giant laser cannon in preparation to destroy Earth, unaware that Victory Saber has survived his most recent assault and is still driven to stop him. On the surface, Landcross takes out one of Deszaras' meteor missiles but is badly damaged in the process; this along with Road Caesar and Greatshot's failed space battle against the fortress leaves the majority of the Autobots out of action. However, Goryu, having finally realized that Deszaras has forsaken the Dinoforce, tells Jan how to stop the fortress, and the young human soon embarks on Galaxy Shuttle only to be unexpectedly accompanied by Stakeout. Victory Saber soon engages in battle with Liokaiser yet again, but separates into Star Saber and Victory Leo after communicating with Jan and learning his plan. Star Saber engages the fortress' defenses while Victory Leo battles Liokaiser, and the leonine Autobot soon defeats the Decepticon gestalt by knocking him into the fortress' laser emitter, which fries him to a crisp before sending him flying through space. Jan, meanwhile, flies into the depths of the fortress and sacrifices his Illumina II mech to take out the power source of the fortress' weaponry, but is knocked unconscious by the explosion. Star Saber heads inside to find him, only to be engaged in a vicious duel by Deszaras that ends with the Decepticon Emperor's defeat; however, Deszaras is able to direct the fortress on a collision course for Earth before ejecting himself into space where he drifts off. Star Saber and Victory Leo join forces to unleash all their firepower on the fortress, resulting in its destruction as the other Autobots return to Earth. The fates of Autobot and Decepticon forces alike are shown, with the Brainmasters and Multiforce seeking additional adventures while Jan continues to attend school with Illumina and the Rescue Team returns to Planet Micro. The Breast Force are shown to have perished, while the repentant Dinoforce put their talents to work building and entertaining children on Earth, and Star Saber and Victory Leo are shown flying into space.
38	"Cybertrons Forever" (サイバトロンは永遠に)	December 19, 1989
The final clip show that aired on TV.
39	"Shine! Star of Victory" (輝け！勝利の星)	Unaired
The first direct to video clip show.
40	"The Great Destruction Win!" (破壊大帝に勝て！)	Unaired
The second direct to video clip show.
41	"SOS! Global Defense Command" (SOS！地球防衛指令)	Unaired
The third direct to video clip show.
42	"Micro Transformers!" (マイクロトランスフォーマー！)	Unaired
The fourth direct to video clip show.
43	"Victory Attack of Friendship!" (友情のビクトリーアタック！)	Unaired
The fifth direct to video clip show.
44	"Echo Across the Galaxy! Bell of Love!!" (銀河にひびけ！愛の鐘！！)	Unaired
The sixth and final direct to video clip show.

== Chapters ==
No.	Title	Japanese release date	Japanese ISBN
1	Fight! Super Robot Life Form Transformers: The Comics 戦え！超ロボット生命体トランスフォーマー ザ☆コミックス	October 23, 2002	978-4813000938
Chapter 1: "Cool! Our Friend, Star Saber!" (「かっこいいぞ！ぼくらのみかた、スターセイバー！」) (April 1989); Chapter 2: "Great Turnaround! Star Saber" (「大逆転！スターセイバー」) (May 1989); Chapter 3: "Leozack's Great Rampage!" (「レオザック大あばれ！」) (June 1989); Chapter 4: "Star Saber Warrior of Love!" (「愛の戦士スターセイバー！」) (July 1989); Chapter 5: "Watch Out, Jean! Hurry, Star Saber!" (「あやうし、ジャン！ いそげ、スターセイバー！」) (August 1989); Chapter 6: "Stars of Friendship, Jean and Star Saber!" (「友情の星、ジャンとスターセイバー！」) (September 1989); Chapter 7: "The Strongest Combination, Unity of Victory!" (「最強コンビ、勝利の合体！」) (October 1989); Chapter 8: "Strong! Victory Saber" (「強いぞ！ビクトリーセイバー！」) (November 1989); Chapter 9: "Shine! Five Stars of Victory" (「かがやけ！勝利の五つ星」) (December 1989); Final Chapter: "Heroic! The Great Victory War" (「そうぜつ！ビクトリー大戦争」) (January 1990)

== Home media ==
The series was released in the UK on DVD in the United Kingdom by Metrodome Distribution on December 26, 2006, as Vol. 3 of "The Takara Collection". Beforehand, the episodes "Star Saber, Hero of the Universe!" and "Muiltiforce, Combine!" were included on Metrodome's Cult Sci-Fi Legends compilation DVD, released on June 5, 2006. The DVDs contain the original Japanese voice track with English subtitles.

In 2008, Madman Entertainment released the series on DVD in Australia in Region 4, PAL format.

The series was released with The Headmasters and Super-God Masterforce in the United States by Shout! Factory on August 28, 2012. The boxset contains 37 episodes on 4 DVDs.

Preceded by Transformers: Super-God Masterforce (4/12/1988 – 3/7/1989)	Nippon TV Tuesday 17:00-17:30 Timeframe; Fight! Super Robot Life-Form Transformers Victory (March 14, 1989 - December 19, 1989)	Succeeded by Tsuru Hime Ja~tsu! (1/9/1990 – 12/25/1990)
