= Yukimasa Kishino =

Japanese actor, voice actor and narrator

- 岸野 幸正
- Born: October 21, 1955 (age 70); Edogawa, Tokyo, Japan
- Occupations: Actor; voice actor; narrator
- Years active: 1979–present
- Agent: Aoni Production
- Height: 170 cm (5 ft 7 in)

Yukimasa Kishino (岸野 幸正, Kishino Yukimasa; born October 21, 1955) is a Japanese actor, voice actor and narrator. He is also active in the theatrical entertainment field and is the chairman of his own theatrical group, Gekidan Kishino Gumi. Some of the members of this group include fellow voice actors Kujira and Masaaki Okura. Among his successful for voicing characters are in Dynasty Warriors and Warriors Orochi series as Cao Cao.

== Filmography ==
=== Anime ===
- 3×3 Eyes (Kimie Shingyōji)
- Akira (Mitsuru Kawata, Assistant, Committee B, Terrorist)
- Tōshinden (Mondo)
- Case Closed (Kunitomo Oda, Hyōe Kuroda)
- Case Closed: Zero the Enforcer (Hyōe Kuroda)
- Cowboy Bebop (Jonathan)
- Dragon Ball Z (Butta, Cell Games Announcer, Tao Pai Pai)
- Dragon Ball Z: The World's Strongest (Kishime)
- Fullmetal Alchemist: The Sacred Star of Milos (Gonzales)
- Hajime no Ippo: The Fighting! (Jimmy Sisphar's coach)
- I'll CKBC (Masahito Hīragi)
- Kiteretsu Daihyakka (Kikunojō Hanamaru)
- Legend of the Galactic Heroes (Stokes)
- Little Nemo: Adventures in Slumberland (Goblin)
- Magic Knight Rayearth (Lafarga)
- One Piece (Higuma)
- Onmyō Taisenki (Sōtarō Tachibana)
- Slam Dunk (Jun Uozumi)
- Slow Step (Bitō)
- Street Fighter II: The Movie (Dhalsim)
- Transformers: Zone (BlackZarak, Predaking)
- Trigun (Ruth Loose)
- Zoids: New Century (Oscar Hemeros)

=== Tokusatsu ===
- B-Fighter Kabuto (Spirit Evil Beast Zanshoror, Darkness Wave Beast Dargriffon)
- Kyukyu Sentai GoGo-V (Spiritworld Guard Psyma Chaos)
- Hyakujuu Sentai Gaoranger (Bus Org)

=== Video games ===
- Castlevania (Walter Bernhard)
- Dead or Alive 3 (Brad Wong)
- Dead or Alive 4 (Brad Wong)
- Double Dragon (Eddie)
- Dynasty Warriors series (Cao Cao)
- Super Dodge Ball (Sabu)
- TwinBee series (Dr. Warumon)
- Valkyria Chronicles series (Calvaro Rodriguez)
- Warriors Orochi series (Cao Cao)
- The Legend of Heroes: Trails in the Sky (Cassius Bright)
- The Legend of Heroes: Trails in the Sky SC (Cassius Bright)
- The Legend of Heroes: Trails in the Sky the 3rd (Cassius Bright)

=== Radio drama ===
- TwinBee Paradise (Dr. Warumon)

=== Dubbing ===
==== Live-action ====
- Speed 2: Cruise Control (Maurice (Glenn Plummer))

==== Animation ====
- Bambi (The Great Prince of the Forest)
- Beast Wars: Transformers (General Ram Horn)
