= The Deep (TV series) =

2015 Australian-Canadian-French-Singaporean-British TV series

- Genre: Action; Adventure; Science fiction Comedy drama
- Created by: Tom Taylor; James Brouwer
- Written by: Tom Taylor; Philip Dalkin; Thomas Duncan-Watt; Daniel Hall; Lawrence Leung; Justine Gillmer
- Directed by: Trent Carlson
- Voices of: Vincent Tong; Ashleigh Ball; Kathleen Barr; Michael Dobson; Brian Drummond
- Composer: Nerida Tyson-Chew
- Countries of origin: Australia; Canada; France (seasons 1–3); Singapore (season 4); United Kingdom (season 4)
- Original language: English
- No. of seasons: 4
- No. of episodes: 65

Production
- Executive producers: Avrill Stark; Asaph Fipke (seasons 1–2); Steven Wendland; Chuck Johnson (season 1); Ken Faier (seasons 1–3); Chris Rose; David Whealy; Robert Chandler; Kirsten Newlands (seasons 2–4); Anne Loi (seasons 3–4); Amanda Isdale (seasons 3–4); Tom Taylor; James Brouwer; Wolfang Bylsma; Alison Warner (season 3); Seng Choon Meng (season 4); Mike Wiluan (season 4); Freddie Yeo (season 4)
- Producers: Avrill Stark; Asaph Fipke (seasons 1–2); Anne Loi (season 3); Deirdré Kelly (season 4); Seng Choon Meng (season 4)
- Running time: 22 minutes
- Production companies: A Stark Production; Technicolor (seasons 1–3); Nerd Corps Entertainment (season 1); WildBrain Studios (seasons 2–4); Infinite Studios (season 4); BBC Children's Productions (season 4)

Original release
- Network: WildBrainTV (Canada); 7two (Australia); CBBC (UK)
- Release: 7 December 2015 – 19 July 2022

The Deep is a CGI-animated television series based on the comic book created by Tom Taylor and James Brouwer and published by Gestalt Publishing. The series was developed by executive producer Robert Chandler, optioned by Technicolor, and produced by A Stark Production of Australia and the Canadian animation studio Nerd Corps Entertainment (credited to WildBrain). Commissioned by the Australian Broadcasting Corporation, it premiered on 7two in December 2015 and began broadcasting in Canada the following month on WildBrainTV. The series was canceled in 2022.

== Synopsis ==
Set in the 22nd century, the series follows the Nektons, a family of adventurous underwater explorers who live aboard a state-of-the-art submarine called the Aronnax and explore unknown areas of the Earth's oceans to unravel the mysteries of the depths. Will Nekton's parents went missing trying to solve the riddle of how to get to the lost city of Lemuria, and the Nektons have refused to abandon it. With the help of family friend Narius, the Nektons know why they are so attracted to solving underwater riddles, as they are the descendants of Lemurians.

The main story arc involves the family's hunt for Lemuria. The story arc is introduced in the first episode, with finding the Chronicle of the Deep. It continues with interpreting its meaning, finding the pieces of the Ephemycron, encountering various Monumentials, interpreting the Ephemycron, and finally discovering Lemuria. Not all episodes are part of the main story arc however.

In season three, the Nektons discover Lemuria, and the main story becomes irrelevant. In season four, the family seek out William Nekton's parents, who found Lemuria several months before them. Like previous seasons, not all episodes are part of this arc. William's parents are found eaten by a monumental nautilus (very much alive), who is searching for a key to the sea, which keeps everything in balance.

== Characters ==
=== The Nekton family ===
- Antaeus "Ant" Nekton (voiced by Vincent Tong) is the youngest child of Nektons' family and the son of William and Kaiko Nekton. He has a pet fish named Jeffrey. He is adventurous, a believer in all kinds of mythical and paranormal things, and always eager to explore the mysteries of the deep. As the youngest of the Lemurian royal family, he is the "Chosen One" according to Nereus and is able to use various Lemurian devices.
- Fontaine Nekton (voiced by Ashleigh Ball (seasons 1–3), Shannon Chan-Kent (season 4)) is Ant's older sister. Like Ant, she is bold, fearless, and adventurous. She enjoys winding Ant up in various ways, but always looks out for him. Smiling Finn has a crush on her.
- William "Will" Nekton (voiced by Michael Dobson) is Ant and Fontaine's father and Kaiko's husband. Once an Olympic swimmer, Will is now a passionate oceanographer. Like generations of Nektons before him, Will has devoted his life to uncovering the secrets of the sea.
- Kaiko Nekton (voiced by Kathleen Barr (seasons 1–3), Elfina Luk (season 4)) is Antaeus and Fontaine's mother and William's wife. She is a marine biologist. Kaiko pilots the Aronnax and is shown to have great mechanical engineering skills.
- Jeffrey is Ant's pet yellowback basslet and best friend. He was first rescued by Ant and started to follow him. He seems to possess an unusual amount of intelligence and sometimes gets involved in adventures of his own while the Nektons are absent.
- Jacques and Katherine Nekton are William's parents who went missing before the series had begun. They are reunited with their Nekton family in season 4. They arrived in Lemuria a few weeks before the Nektons but then were eaten by a nautilus.

=== Protagonists ===
- Professor Fiction (voiced by James Higuchi) is the Nektons' scientific adviser, as well as the builder of the Aronnax and the Knights. His inventions usually require tweaking and testing but are extremely effective when working correctly.
- Bob Gorman (voiced by Michael Kopsa) is a close friend of the Nektons.
- Jess Gorman (voiced by Shannon Chan-Kent) is the daughter of Bob Gorman, Fontaine's best friend, and Ant's crush.
- Commander Pyrosome (voiced by Nicole Oliver) is the leader of the World Oceans Authority, generally only appearing by video call.
- Kenji Nokumura (voiced by Lee Tockar) is a Japanese man who lives alone on an island. He previously worked as a prop designer in kaiju films.
- Nereus (voiced by Lee Tockar) is an eccentric old bearded man who gives the Nektons vague (but often unexpectedly useful) advice on their search for Lemuria. He is mysterious and often gives the Nektons advice in riddles. He sometimes arrives or appears unexpectedly, which initially unnerves the Nektons. In "Lemuria", it is revealed that he is ~6,000 years old and the brother of the last Queen of Lemuria. He is the founder of the Order of Guardians, which he made with the survivors of Lemuria and their descendants, for the purpose of preserving their culture.

=== Antagonists ===
- Captain Hammerhead (voiced by Michael Dobson) is the Captain of the Dark Orca pirate crew and the father of Smiling Finn and Mad Madeline. Although he is a pirate and rough with anyone who gets in his way, he tries to be a good father to Finn and Madeline.
- 'Smiling' Finn Hammerhead (voiced by Samuel Vincent) is the son of Captain Hammerhead and reluctant teen pirate, who has a crush on Fontaine, who also has a crush on him and calls him "Pirate Boy".
- 'Mad' Madeline Hammerhead (voiced by Kazumi Evans) is the daughter of Captain Hammerhead. She loves everything related to being a pirate and outwardly detests Ant and the Nektons, though is very jealous of their equipment.
- Danny Boy (voiced by Brian Drummond) is the first mate of the Dark Orca pirate crew and is easily intimidated by Captain Hammerhead. He is a mechanic but struggles with poor equipment and a lack of materials on the Dark Orca, and his repairs and inventions usually break quickly.
- Proteus (voiced by Brian Drummond) is a former member of The Guardians. He initially appears as the leader of the Guardians until he is later revealed to be a traitor in "The Proteus Factor". He becomes an advisor to Alpheus Benthos after the events of "Tartaruga" until Alpheus ejects him from the submarine in "Hidden Secrets".
- Alpheus Benthos (voiced by Andrew Francis): Descended from a "rogue branch" of the Lemurian royal family, Alpheus considers Ant to be his nemesis and is also attempting to find Lemuria, but for his own benefit. He lives on a nuclear fusion powered sub he built, along with the artificial intelligence A.R.I.A. Nereus once thought Alpheus was the Chosen One. He is usually quite calm and likes to ensure he is always in charge of any situation.
- Dolos (voiced by Brian Drummond) is a selfish, snobby researcher who despises children and only cares about treasure, money, and his pet octopus Hydra. He operates out of the Floating Black Market and will do anything for enough money.
- Devil Daniels (voiced by Trevor Devall) is an internet-famous "monster hunter" and vlogger. His adventures often clash with the Nektons' activities, who hinder him to avoid harm to the targets of his hunts. As well as putting on a fake British accent, Daniels often fakes his adventures and has no consideration for animal welfare. He is cowardly and will do anything to gain and retain viewers—besides placing himself in any real danger.

=== Non-human characters ===
- A.R.I.A. is the highly sophisticated artificial intelligence that operates Alpheus Benthos' submarine. She was created by Alpheus' father and was turned into the AI mind of Alpheus's submarine.
- The Kraken, or The Terror, is a vast octopus-like creature that is locked up behind the gates of Lemuria. It first appears in "The Gates", and it tries to escape any time the gates of Lemuria are opened whilst also trying to destroy anyone and anything around the entrance. It is a Monumential, but unlike the others, does not seem to be simply a much larger version of its normal-sized counterpart.
- The Monumential Turtle is a gigantic turtle, initially mistaken for the island of Tartaruga, until it awakens and dives below the surface. It later appears in "The Purple Tide", where it nearly eats the Aronnax by mistake, but the turtle is one of the more benevolent monumentials, as opposed to their usually quite hostile nature.
- The Monumential Ray is a giant torpedo ray which usually sleeps below Catatumbo Bay, Venezuela. (Note: Catatumbo Bay is a fictionalised version of the real Gulf of Venezuela.) It is capable of generating enormous bolts of lightning, which it directs at anything which gets in its way. This lightning, besides using the Ephemycron, is the only way of opening the gates of Lemuria. It is accompanied by several smaller electric rays.

=== Groups ===
- World Oceans Authority: The police and search-and-rescue of the open ocean, they target criminals on the oceans and rescue people in danger, but sometimes call the Nektons for assistance in some situations.
- Monumentials are large and ancient sea creatures. Often hostile or inherently dangerous, Lemurian scientists used their technology to put them to sleep, containing them for thousands of years. They have begun to wake up and can only be put back to sleep with the Queen's Scepter.
- The Guardians are a group of people who work to preserve Lemurian culture, established by Nereus after the fall of Lemuria. They are extremely knowledgeable about anything to do with Lemuria but are reluctant to divulge too much. They are quite well equipped, having access to helicopters as seen in "The Proteus Factor", but prefer to travel by rowboat (or other small, open boats) over the ocean. They can communicate via special staffs, which can also be used to block other communications signals. They wear a characteristic dark grey robe with gold-coloured edging. Most are descended from the Lemurians.

=== Objects ===
==== Lemurian ====
- Ephemycron is an ancient navigational tablet. It aligns with the stars and various markers around the world, placed by Lemurians, before then projecting a map which gives the locations of various points of interest, such as dangerous places to avoid, the locations of Monumentials, and other special sites. The first season revolves around the hunt for all three pieces of it, even though it is only introduced in "The Test". It is the main way of opening the gates of Lemuria, and only the youngest person in each line of the Lemurian royal family (Ant and Alpheus) can operate it.
- The Chronicle of the Deep is a kind of scroll that contains information about the Lemurian culture and associated artifacts and locations. It was hidden in a cave within an ocean trench, retrieved by the Nektons in "Here Be Dragons". There are several different ways to open it, each of which reveals a different part of the Chronicle.
- The Sceptre of Queen Dorieas, also known as the Queen's Sceptre, is the only way of truly controlling the Monumentials and is the only way of returning them to their millennia-long sleep after they have awoken. The third season revolves around getting possession of it and using it for the first time. It activates when exposed to water and can reassemble itself if broken, as well as adhere to the hands of the person who is able to wield it.

==== Nektons ====
- Knights are mechanised suits built by Professor Fiction for use by the Nektons. The White Knight, the first to be introduced, is the simplest design. The Shadow Knight is fast (90 kilometres per hour (56 mph) top speed) and has a stealth mode. It is usually used by Ant. The Swamp Knight is a large amphibious Knight model (the other Knights sometimes also walk on land). The Mag Knight, usually used by Will, is the largest and most powerful. The Mimic Knight is a fast and agile Knight which somewhat resembles a mermaid, with an ability to "see" using echolocation and to change colour to blend in with other marine creatures. The Mimic Knight is usually used by Fontaine. The Jeffery Knight is a small fish bowl on a chassis and wheels, which Jeffery can use to get around when out of the water or to give extra protection outside the Aronnax, and is controlled by his swimming. The Knights are usually made from carbon fiber composites.
- Aronnax is the Nektons submarine. Described as the "world's largest submarine", it serves as the Nektons home, additionally containing a library, medical bay, laboratory, kitchen, several bedrooms, a moon pool, and various other facilities. It has a system of tubes and cavities connected to fish tanks in several rooms, which Jeffery can use to travel around the submarine. It has a "water-powered" engine, and batteries, as well as a traditional screw propeller for forward propulsion, giving it a top speed of 80 kilometres per hour (50 mph). Its hull is made from titanium, allowing it to withstand high temperatures and highly corrosive environments. Aronnax could have been named after Profesor Pierre Aronnax, the character of the book 20 000 Leagues Under the Seas by Jules Verne.

== Episodes ==
=== Season 1 (2015–16) ===
No. overall	No. in season	Title	Original release date
1	1	"Here Be Dragons"	7 December 2015
The Nekton family investigates reports of a sea monster near Greenland and encounters a gigantic, plesiosaur-like creature near an ocean trench. Going ashore, they meet an old man called Nereus, who tells Ant that the monster is guarding a secret and suggests they go and look for it. They discover a strange kind of scroll (the Chronicle of the Deep), and, after a narrow escape from the monster and a closing ocean trench, find that it may hold clues to the location of Lemuria.
2	2	"The Dark Orca"	14 December 2015
The Nektons visit the Floating Black Market to see Dolos, who they believe might be able to translate some symbols from the Chronicle of the Deep. Meanwhile, the pirate Captain Hammerhead of the submarine The Dark Orca decides that the Nektons must be seeking treasure or already have it and sets out in pursuit of them. The Nektons follow up on a lead that Dolos gave them, find a cave with a strange symbol on the roof, and narrowly escape from Hammerhead.
3	3	"A.I.M.Y."	22 January 2016
Professor Fiction builds an artificial intelligence, called A.I.M.Y, into the Aronnax and the Nekton's other equipment to "help and protect" the Nektons, but it becomes overprotective, then unresponsive, and tries to prevent them from performing a rescue, as it deems it too dangerous. After being told that its idea of "protecting" is not "helping", it shuts down, unable to reconcile its goals.
4	4	"Digging Deeper"	28 January 2016
It is the day before Ant's birthday and the Captain of a cargo ship requests the Nektons assistance with salvaging (what he claims to be) a generator from the Challenger Deep. He is actually smuggling a weapon, however, and a stowaway sneaks onto the Aronnax to try to seize the submarine after the weapon has been recovered. After burying the weapon under the seafloor, thereby making the deepest part of the ocean even deeper, Ant has a birthday treat in the Challenger Deep.
5	5	"The Devil's Sea Mystery"	7 February 2016
The Nektons visit Kenji Nokumura, who has had "aliens" steal his fridge and later his water tank. While investigating a strange object nearby, Will is kidnapped by it. They follow the object to a cave where they find a colony of gigantic, bioluminescent hermit crabs, the largest of which takes the Nektons rover for its new shell. It turns out that the crabs were using Kenji's fridge and water tank for shells, along with a mini-sub, concrete water pipes, and any other hollow objects they could find.
6	6	"Lonesome Jim"	9 February 2016
Lonesome Jim is the last surviving Floreana Island tortoise. (Note: The real Floreana Island tortoise (Chelonoidis niger niger) went extinct in the mid-19th century.) Hope for the species is revived when Bob Gorman and his daughter, Jess, find a second Floreana island tortoise, Eve, and bring her to the Nektons. They all go to Floreana Island and introduce her to Jim, but both tortoises go missing overnight. They are traced to the underwater home of a rich businessman, Sebastian Conger, where it turns out that the second tortoise was a robot. Conger imprisons Kaiko and Will, but Ant and Fontaine sneak aboard, break them out, and escape with the tortoises as the World Oceans Authority closes in on Conger. They leave Eve with Jim to keep him company.
7	7	"Captured"	2 March 2016
Captain Hammerhead captures the Nektons after luring them in with a phony call for help, as he wants the Chronicle of the Deep (the scroll found in "Here Be Dragons"), but Ant and Fontaine break out. Ant sabotages the Dark Orca but is interrupted by Madeline, who accidentally causes the Dark Orca to start sinking. The pirates reluctantly team up with the Nektons and save the Dark Orca.
8	8	"The Test"	9 March 2016
The Guardians arrange a test to determine whether the Nektons should be assisted in interpreting the Chronicle of the Deep. Ant seems to have an uncanny ability to find solutions to various challenges. The test goes wrong when some robot jellyfish attack them, and it turns out that they were not part of the test and that someone within the Guardians had sabotaged the test. Ant finds another piece of the Ephemycron but narrowly escapes being eaten by a giant creature, as the piece was stuck to its lure.
9	9	"Fossil"	27 April 2016
The archeologist Agnes De-Kretser invites the Nektons to view some fossils she has discovered and to get their help with searching some partly sunken caves where she thinks there may be more fossils. It soon turns out that the fossils are not actually fossils and are the recent bones of a gigantic crocodile-like creature still living in the caves.
10	10	"Colossal Squid"	23 March 2016
Kaiko accidentally causes a major power surge whilst changing a lightbulb. Then the Nektons find a Colossal squid, apparently dead, but whilst filming it, the squid and the rest of its pack attack them, as it was only acting as a decoy. After the electrical problems cause a fire which nearly forces them to abandon the Aronnax, they are saved by a pack of Sperm whales.
11	11	"Monster Hunter"	30 March 2016
A camera set up by Ant captures photos of a strange sea creature, and a self-proclaimed "monster hunter" and internet celebrity Devil Daniels sets out to hunt it. It turns out to be a giant seadragon, and the Nektons find that Daniels has placed an electric shock device on it to make it appear aggressive to boost the views on his videos. After saving the creature from Daniels, they relocate it to a remote location where it can remain undisturbed.
12	12	"The Phantom Sub"	13 April 2016
The Aronnax is damaged whilst evading a collision with a strange submarine. They return to their home base, where Lester, the mechanic, and Professor Fiction begin repair work. Lester's son, Griffin, wants to go on adventures with Ant, but Lester worries that he will be hurt. Whilst Ant and Griffin are out on the Nekton's solar skis (jet skis), the sub appears again and stops nearby. While exploring it, it sets off, and they are forced to learn how to control the submarine and return to the home base without using any modern equipment.
13	13	"Tunnel"	20 April 2016
The Nektons are sucked into a strange underwater tunnel in the Antarctic ice, and Kaiko is injured. Nereus arrives and warns them that the tunnel is actually a gigantic sea worm and a Monumental. He tells them about Monumentals and warns them that they have to be careful to avoid waking them. With Nereus' help, they rescue Kaiko and escape, barely avoiding waking the creature fully.
14	14	"The Abyss Stares Back"	17 March 2016
The Nektons encounter a large colony of mimic octopuses, which unusually, practise aggressive mimicry. They imitate the Nektons and their equipment to lure them into their lair. After initial confusion, they realise what is happening and barely escape the combined onslaught of every octopus in the colony.
15	15	"Treasure of the Islanders"	16 March 2016
The Nektons get a map off Dolos to hunt for treasure to help the Raraku Islanders, whose island has been left barren by natural disasters. Dolos, however, also gave an identical map to Captain Hammerhead, and the Nektons and the pirates race to get there first. When it turns out that the treasure is actually a seed bank, Hammerhead loses interest, but the Nektons know that the treasure is more than it appears, being of great value to restore Raraku.
16	16	"The Junior Nektons"	18 May 2016
Some children from the Nektons fan club "The Junior Nektons" come aboard to see sperm whales migrating. Ant and Fontaine think that taking care of eight-year-old children will be easy, but things don't quite go according to plan. Will and Kaiko have to cut a path through a huge drift net blocking the migration route, and Ant and Fontaine have to work with the Junior Nektons to rescue a whale calf that has become entangled in lobster pots. Ant and Fontaine find that taking care of children is harder.
17	17	"The Sunken Gallery"	11 May 2016
A painting is stolen from a shipwreck, and the Nektons are framed for the theft and placed under arrest. To clear their name, Ant and Fontaine have to evade the World Oceans Authority and infiltrate Sebastian Conger's base to retrieve the painting. In doing so, they find a piece of the Ephemycron and expose a mole in the World Oceans Authority, but the piece they found in "The Test" is stolen by Conger.
18	18	"The Field of Giants"	14 June 2016
The Nektons find a colony of abnormally large giant clams, and so does Captain Hammerhead, who is interested in the giant pearl inside one of them. Hammerhead's attempts to steal it result in Finn and Fontaine being trapped inside whilst a nearby underwater volcano threatens to destroy the entire colony. The pirates and the Nektons must work together to save the clams and their children.
19	19	"The Proteus Factor"	25 July 2016
Proteus, a member of the Guardians, comes aboard the Aronnax. He seems anxious to help them find Lemuria, but it soon turns out that he has led them into a trap, and he kidnaps Ant, steals their piece of the Ephemycron, and escapes in the rover. He tries to get Ant to assemble the Ephemycron from the two pieces found so far, but as it is incomplete, it does not work. The Guardians arrive, as they had been following Proteus, who escapes with both pieces of the Ephemycron.
20	20	"The Song of the Siren"	22 August 2016
Whilst exploring a reef, Ant hears a strange song. As they leave the reef, another fish is confused for Jeffery, and he gets left behind. Meanwhile, the Nektons find that the song is from an extremely rare whale species, but Devil Daniels thinks it is a siren and sets out to capture it and inadvertently captures Jeffery as well, who has befriended the whale. After some persuading, Daniels agrees to take the whale to introduce it to the only other known individual of its species.
21	21	"Bad Luck Fish"	16 August 2016
Ships are disappearing in the Sargasso Sea, and the disappearances seem linked to a strange "Bad Luck Fish". Dolos decides to go treasure hunting but soon has to be rescued after his boat sinks soon, after the "Bad Luck Fish" appears. Dolos steals the rover, and the Aronnax is stuck inside a giant methane bubble, but Dolos gets lost in the kelp and has to let Ant get him back to the Aronnax. After a daring escape plan of Ant's works, the Aronnax is freed.
22	22	"Strange Migration"	15 August 2016
Numerous different species are tracked going on a very unusual migration. When they track down the migrating animals, they instead find two Megalodon (which have eaten all the different "migrating" species) and narrowly avoid becoming food themselves.
23	23	"Bloop"	23 August 2016
The source of the strange underwater sound Bloop is found to be a sort of sentient coral by the Nektons, but it is under threat from an autonomous seafloor mining machine. The Nektons convince the operator that the coral is important but then have to stop it themselves anyway, as the machine goes out of control.
24	24	"The Twilight Zone"	1 August 2016
Whilst investigating the disappearance of fish from an ocean area near Taiwan, all the Nektons except Fontaine are mesmerised by the light from a giant anglerfish, which has also attracted every fish from a huge area around it. Fontaine has to rescue her family on her own without also falling under the spell of the anglerfish.
25	25	"Loki's Castle"	29 August 2016
Devil Daniels claims that he has found a Viking treasure ship in Loki's Castle, but Hammerhead finds out and kidnaps him. When the Nektons try to rescue Daniels, Hammerhead captures the Aronnax, but the Nektons take over the Dark Orca with the treasure aboard. By dumping the treasure into a volcano, the Nektons force Hammerhead to leave the Aronnax. Back aboard the Aronnax, they reveal to Daniels that they knew the treasure was fake and turn him over to the authorities for his fraud.
26	26	"Tartaruga"	12 September 2016
Strange things are happening to the island of Tartaruga. The Nektons and Nereus go to investigate and find that the island is floating. Discovering a cave, Ant and Fontaine go inside, where they meet Proteus. Meanwhile, they find that the island is actually a Monumental Turtle, which is waking up, and will dive below the water. The islanders are evacuated, but the turtle dives with Ant and Fontaine inside its shell (the "cave"), but Nereus manages to get the turtle to let Will and Kaiko inside to rescue them. Proteus tries to get Ant to assemble the Ephemycron, but he and Fontaine steal it instead. Once the Nektons are back together, Nereus reveals that the Nektons are descended from Lemurians, and Ant finally assembles the Ephemycron.

=== Season 2 (2017) ===
No. overall	No. in season	Title	Original release date
27	1	"From the Stars"	10 January 2017
Following the events of "Tartaruga", Ant figures out how to work the Ephemycron. A World Oceans Authority satellite crashes into the ocean, and the Nektons are tasked with retrieving it. They soon encounter a new adversary, Alpheus Benthos, who brought down the satellite to steal the data stored on board. They soon find that the satellite is about to explode and have to figure out how to get it as far away as possible before it does.
28	2	"The Baltic Sea Anomaly"	11 January 2017
The Nektons explore the Baltic Sea anomaly, but in doing so, disturb a huge colony of Mantis shrimp living inside, which attack the Aronnax.
29	3	"Mermaids"	1 July 2016
Fontaine tricks Ant by pretending to be a mermaid whilst trying out the new Mimic Knight. Before she has been able to iron out the glitches in the Knight with Professor Fiction, Captain Hammerhead captures her and Fiction. He then forces Fiction to build a Super Knight using junk from the Dark Orca, so that he can get something off a sunken submarine. Fontaine offers to retrieve it instead, and, due to issues with the Super Knight, Hammerhead agrees. When it gets back, it turns out to be a photo of Mad Madeline and her mother dressed as mermaids on Madeline's first birthday, which Hammerhead wanted for a birthday present for her.
30	4	"Treacherous Waters"	24 February 2017
The Nektons and the Aronnax are trapped inside a strange area in the Bermuda Triangle, where space and time are distorted, and where tardigrades are the only living creatures, and there is apparently a complete vacuum outside, rendering the Aronnax immobile. They soon find that the environment will tear the Aronnax apart if they don't escape quickly, and Ant devises a fish-led exit strategy to get out. Alpheus and Proteus, however, followed them in and made the escape more complicated.
31	5	"Kenji's Monster"	23 February 2017
A strange monster is heading for the island where Kenji lives, and the Nektons have to figure out how to stop it, before it destroys the cave of the giant hermit crabs.
32	6	"Finn Comes Aboard"	17 March 2017
When Finn boards the Aronnax with a treasure map, the Nektons are suspicious, but it soon turns out that he was trying to stop his father from falling victim to a curse. The curse soon turns out to be real, as the treasure was covered in a form of monkshood toxin, and Will falls gravely ill. They find an antidote to save Will and then get Finn back to the Dark Orca.
33	7	"Beware the Sentinels"	22 February 2017
Kaiko is trapped inside an ancient sunken tomb by a school of venomous stonefish. When the rest of the Nektons are trapped as well after trying to rescue her, Ant finds that being the smallest of the Nektons does have its advantages, letting him escape and rescue his family.
34	8	"Hidden Secrets"	21 February 2017
The rover goes haywire, and while Will and Kaiko deal with the situation, Alpheus makes a hostile boarding of the Aronnax and takes Ant aboard his sub. Fontaine tries to sneak in to rescue Ant, but is caught with the Ephemycron, which she took from the Aronnax. Alpheus successfully activates the Ephemycron, and Proteus reveals him to be descended from Lemurian royalty, but after an argument with Proteus, Alpheus ejects him from the submarine. In the confusion, Ant and Fontaine escape with the Ephemycron and return to the Aronnax.
35	9	"The Maze"	30 August 2017
The Nektons investigate a strange symbol from the Ephemycron's map and find a strange maze. They find that the maze is actually a combination of moving walls, fixed walls and holograms projected by bioluminescent orbs. Upon reaching the centre, they find that the maze has a purpose, to keep two minotaurs in, and have to escape from both the maze and the Minotaurs. (Note: The minotaurs are shown as having a shark body in place of legs, and are herbivorous, albeit very bad-tempered.)
36	10	"Whale of a Tale"	29 August 2017
Devil Daniels finds Moby Dick and resolves to capture him for an attraction in his own theme park. Despite the Nekton's efforts, he succeeds, and the Nektons have to break Moby out before the park opens the next morning.
37	11	"The Missing"	22 September 2017
Following an oil slick, the Nektons find the Dark Orca and discover the pirates hiding from "ghosts", who are actually baby eels. The arrival of the much bigger mother eel makes the situation more complicated, and they have to get the eels back to her before she destroys the Dark Orca.
38	12	"Thunder and Lightning"	16 August 2017
The Catatumbo storm (Note: A fictionalised and exaggerated version of the real Catatumbo lightning phenomenon.) has suddenly begun to get much stronger, and the Nektons (and a reluctant Nereus) go to investigate. They find that it is being powered by a giant Monumential Ray, but the Ray knocks out the power to the Aronnax. They have to restore the power to the Aronnax before it falls onto the Ray and wakes it up.
39	13	"The Gates"	15 August 2017

=== Season 3 (2018–19) ===
No. overall	No. in season	Title	Original release date
40	1	"The Treasure"	12 November 2018
41	2	"Offline"	7 February 2019
42	3	"Friends in Deep Places"	6 February 2019
44	4	"Just Eaten"	4 March 2019
44	5	"Family Ties"	5 March 2019
45	6	"The Circle Game"	5 February 2019
46	7	"The Unicorn"	4 February 2019
47	8	"Purple Tide"	6 March 2019
48	9	"The Race"	7 March 2019
49	10	"Kidnapped"	10 June 2019
50	11	"More Thunder and Lightning"	11 June 2019
51	12	"Lemuria"	12 June 2019
52	13	"The Sceptre"	13 June 2019

=== Season 4 (2022) ===
No. overall	No. in season	Title	Original release date
53	1	"The Hole Truth"	30 May 2022
54	2	"The Biggest"	30 May 2022
55	3	"Little Problems"	30 May 2022
56	4	"The Lead"	30 May 2022
57	5	"AWOL"	30 May 2022
58	6	"Deceptive Appearances"	24 June 2022
59	7	"Glass Houses"	24 June 2022
60	8	"Unidentified Floating Objects"	24 June 2022
61	9	"At the Bottom of the Gyre"	24 June 2022
62	10	"Walking with Fish"	19 July 2022
63	11	"Getting Warmer"	19 July 2022
64	12	"The Big Clue"	19 July 2022
65	13	"The Inside Story"	19 July 2022

== Broadcast and release ==
The Deep aired on Ici Radio-Canada Télé in Canada, and Universal Kids in the United States. It aired on CBBC in the UK, RTS Deux in Switzerland, Marvel HQ in India, La Trois in Belgium, Ketnet in Belgium, NRK in Norway, DR in Denmark, SVT in Sweden, YLE in Finland, Okto in Singapore, Super RTL in Germany, TVP ABC in Poland and eToonz in South Africa. In the United States, the series premiered on Netflix on 1 June 2016.

== Merchandise ==
In August 2017, WildBrain published The Deep: Sea of Shadows video game for Android and iOS devices. The following month, Simba Toys acquired the master toy license to release a range of products across Germany, Austria, Switzerland, the United Kingdom and Nordic Europe in 2018. In October 2018, Bloomsbury published an official handbook and activity book alongside two original novels written by Finn Black. A virtual reality video game based on the series, titled The Deep: Beyond the Reef, was released for Meta Quest 3 in October 2025.

== Home media ==
The Deep has been released on DVD in Australia by ABC DVD.

== Awards ==
The Deep has been nominated for several awards, including a BAFTA award in 2018 and four AWGIE Awards, for writing. In 2017, it won the AWGIE award for best Children's Television (C-classification) for the episode "Beware the Sentinels", written by Thomas Duncan-Watt.

== Reception ==
The Deep was positively received. Emily Ashby of Common Sense Media described the series as a "fantastic family-focused adventure". She also argued that the series has "exceptional messages about working together, solving problems, and finding strength in those who love you" and called it an "excellent pick for families to enjoy together".

== See also ==
- List of underwater science fiction works
