= Neverlanders =

Young Adult Graphic Novel

- Author: Tom Taylor
- Illustrator: Jon Sommariva
- Language: English
- Published: 2022
- Publisher: Razorbill/ Penguin
- Publication date: September 20, 2022
- ISBN: 9781761049071

Winner of the Children's Book of the Year, Neverlanders is a young adult graphic novel series by the #1 New York Times bestselling author Tom Taylor and artist Jon Sommariva. The first Neverlanders was published by Penguin Books in 2022 with the sequel, Neverlanders: Get Lost, published in 2026. Neverlanders is set in the well-known world of Peter Pan, but serves as a gritty sequel of a found family after the fall of the Lost Boys and Peter Pan.

== Content ==
The story of Neverlanders goes beyond the tale of the sole surviving Lost Boy. Neverlanders delves into the world of runaways who find themselves transported to Neverland to experience the chaotic aftermath of Peter Pan's fall. The young people band together with General Tinkerbell and her army of fairies to protect Neverland and their future from the greedy adults of Otherland.

== Critical reception ==
The first book debuted to positive reviews.

According to Kirkus Reviews, "The fast-paced, adventure-filled storyline forms a well-constructed story that adapts elements from the original world of Peter Pan and includes touches of humor that will keep readers engaged." "The illustrations are bright and expressive, with creatively varied panels that draw readers' eyes. Names and physical appearances highlight a racially diverse cast."

Booklist noted, "Neverlanders reimagines J. M. Barrie's classic Peter Pan in a darker, grittier atmosphere that nonetheless maintains many of the core themes from the original. Taylor and Sommariva inject the classic story with contemporary characters and concerns, and the dynamic, cinematic artwork heightens the high-fantasy feel. Tween fantasy fans will appreciate this engaging ensemble adventure with a solid friendship plot at its heart."

School Library Journal said, "This original take on Peter Pan […] brings a new generation into the fold, and the world of the story completely to life with intricate art laced with rich hues of greens and blues. Readers will not want to leave the characters behind in this magical world. Create room on the shelf for this new fantasy graphic novel with roots in the classic, filled with action-packed battles and splendid depictions of a steampunk world.

The sequel, Neverlanders: Get Lost, also received positive reviews.

Kirkus Reviews praised the sequel, noting, "The story, which incorporates themes of mental health, forgiveness, and community, strikes a strong balance between humor, action, and self-reflection." "A thrilling adventure tale grounded in relationships."

Christopher Paolini, the internationally bestselling author of Eragon called Get Lost "A rollicking adventure that takes readers on an epic journey to save the heart of Neverland itself.”

== Awards ==
In 2023, Neverlanders became the first graphic novel to win the prestigious Children's Book of the Year Award: Older Readers.

Neverlanders also won a Comic Arts Award of Australia in 2023.

In 2025, Neverlanders won the Prix Des Collegiens De La Somme, awarded in Amiens, France, where the book is published by Dupuis with the title "Retour à Neverland".

Neverlanders has been nominated for the Aurealis Award for best illustrated book or graphic novel and the ASLA DANZ Children's Book Award.

== Film adaptation ==
In November 2025, an animated film adaptation was announced to be in the works at Australian company Pixel Zoo. Taylor and Sommariva will be involved as writer and art director respectively.

== Interviews/articles ==
- 'Peter Pan'-Inspired 'Neverlanders' Acquired by Penguin Random House Hollywood Reporter
- Neverlanders Becomes First Comic Book to Win Prestigious CBCA Award IGN
- Tom Taylor Children's Comic Makes History With Award Win Screen Rant
- Pixel Zoo Animation Studios Developing Tom Taylor & Jon Sommariva’s Peter Pan-Inspired ‘Neverlanders’ As Movie
