= Aurealis Award for Best Illustrated Book or Graphic Novel =

Australian awards for illustrated speculative fiction

Aurealis Award for best illustrated book or graphic novel
- Awarded for: Excellence in speculative fiction illustrated books or graphic novels
- Country: Australia
- Presented by: Chimaera Publications, Continuum Foundation
- First award: 2008
- Currently held by: Greg Rucka & Nicola Scott
- Website: Official site

The Aurealis Awards are presented annually by the Australia-based Chimaera Publications and WASFF to published works in order to "recognise the achievements of Australian science fiction, fantasy, horror writers". To qualify, a work must have been first published by an Australian citizen or permanent resident between 1 January and 31 December of the corresponding year; the presentation ceremony is held the following year. It has grown from a small function of around 20 people to a two-day event attended by over 200 people.

Since their creation in 1995, awards have been given in various categories of speculative fiction. Categories currently include science fiction, fantasy, horror, speculative young adult fiction—with separate awards for novels and short fiction—collections, anthologies, illustrative works or graphic novels, children's books, and an award for excellence in speculative fiction. The awards have attracted the attention of publishers by setting down a benchmark in science fiction and fantasy. The continued sponsorship by publishers such as HarperCollins and Orbit has identified the award as an honour to be taken seriously.

The results are decided by a panel of judges from a list of submitted nominees; the long-list of nominees is reduced to a short-list of finalists. The judges are selected from a public application process by the Award's management team.

This article lists all the short-list nominees and winners in the best illustrated book or graphic novel category. The award for best illustrated book or graphic novel was first awarded in 2008 along with two other categories; best anthology and best book or collection to replace the discontinued Golden Aurealis awards. Shaun Tan has won the award three times, while Justin Randall, Tom Taylor and James Brouwer have won it twice. Tan also holds the record for most nominations, having received four nominations.

== Winners and nominees ==
In the following table, the years correspond to the year of the book or novel's eligibility; the ceremonies are always held the following year. Each year links to the corresponding "year in literature" article. Entries with a blue background have won the award, while those with a white background are the nominees on the short-list.

* Winners and joint winners
* Nominees on the shortlist

Year	Author(s)	Illustrated book or graphic novel	Publisher	Ref
2008	Shaun Tan*	Tales from Outer Suburbia	Allen & Unwin	
2008	Steve Hunt & David Richardson	The Cloudchasers	ABC Books	
2008	Colin Thompson	The Floods Family Files	Random House	
2008	Julie Watts	The Art of Graeme Base	Viking Press	
2009	Nathan Jurevicius*	Scarygirl	Allen & Unwin	
2009	Bruce Mutard	The Silence	Allen & Unwin	
2009	Emily Rodda & Marc McBride	Secrets of Deltora	Scholastic	
2009	Madeleine Rosca	Hollow Fields	Seven Seas Entertainment	
2010	Justin Randall*	Changing Ways	Gestalt Publishing	
2010	Nicki Greenberg	Shakespeare's Hamlet	Allen & Unwin	
2010	Jason Paulos et al.	EEEK!: Weird Tales of Suspense	Black House Comics	
2010	Jonathan Walker & Dan Hallett	Five Wounds: An Illustrated Novel	Black House Comics	
2010	Rocky Wood & Glenn Chadbourne	Horrors: Great Stories of Fear and Their Creators	McFarlane & Co	
2011	Mirranda Burton* (tie)	Hidden	Black Pepper Publishing	
2011	Tom Taylor & James Brouwer (illustrator)* (tie)	The Deep: Here Be Dragons	Gestalt Publishing	
2011	Andrew Constant, Joh James (illustrator), Nicola Scott (illustrator), Emily Smith (illustrator)	Torn	Gestalt Publishing	
2011	Mozchops	Salsa Invertebraxa	Pecksniff Press	
2011	Christian Read & Michael Maier (illustrator)	The Eldritch Kid: Whiskey and Hate	Gestalt Publishing	
2012	Pat Grant*	Blue	Giromondo Publishing	
2012	Tim Molloy	It Shines and Shakes and Laughs	Milk Shadow Books	
2012	Justin Randall	Changing Ways 2	Gestalt Publishing	
2013	Jackie Ryan* (tie)	Burger Force	Jackie Ryan	
2013	Tom Taylor & James Brouwer* (tie)	The Deep, Vol. 2: The Vanishing Island	Gestalt Publishing	
2013	Steve Carter & Antoinette Rydyr	Savage Bitch	Scar Studios	
2013	Tim Molloy	Mr Unpronounceable Adventures	Milk Shadow Books	
2013	Shane W. Smith	Peaceful Tomorrows Volume Two	Zetabella Publications	
2014	Tim Molloy*	Mr Unpronounceable and the Sect of the Bleeding Eye	Milk Shadow Books	
2014	Jason Franks & Paul Abstruse	Left Hand Path #1	Winter City Productions	
2014	Jase Harper	Awkwood	Milk Shadow Books	
2014	Kathleen Jennings	"A Small Wild Magic"	Candlewick Press (Monstrous Affections)	
2014	Shane Smith	The Game	Deeper Meaning Publishing	
2015	Shaun Tan*	The Singing Bones	Allen & Unwin	
2015	Gary Chaloner, Ben Templesmith and Ashley Wood	The Undertaker Morton Stone Vol.1	Gestalt Publishing	
2015	Jamie Clenett	The Diemenois	Hunter Publishers	
2015	Christian Read	Unmasked Vol.1: Going Straight is No Way to Die	Gestalt Publishing	
2015	(various authors)	Fly the Colour Fantastica	Veriko Operative	
2016	Ryan K. Lindsay*	Negative Space	Dark HorseComics	
2016	Lance Balchin	Mechanica	The Five Mile Press	
2016	James Foley	Brobot	Fremantle Press	
2016	Josh Vann	The Spider King	(self-published)	
2017	Justin Randall*	Changing Ways 3	Gestalt Publishing	
2017	Mike Barry	Action Tank	Mike Barry Was Here	
2017	James Foley	Dungzilla	Fremantle Press	
2017	Craig Phillips	Giants, Trolls, Witches, Beasts	Allen & Unwin	
2017	Campbell Whyte	Home Time	Penguin Random House Australia	
2017	Margo Lanagan (writer) & Rovina Cai (illustrator)	Tintinnabula	Little Hare	
2018	Shaun Tan*	Tales from the Inner City	Allen & Unwin	
2018	Rob O'Connor	Deathship Jenny	(self-published)	
2018	Shaun Tan	Cicada	Hachette Australia	
2019	Greg Rucka* (writer) & Nicola Scott* (illustrator)	Black Magick	Image Comics	
2019	Norm Harper & Louie Joyce	Haphaven	Lion Forge	
2019	Tohby Riddle	Yahoo Creek	Allen & Unwin	
2019	Krys Saclier	Super Nova	Ford Street	
2019	Renee Treml	Sherlock Bones and the Natural History Mystery	Allen & Unwin	
2020	Chris Gooch*	Under-Earth	Top Shelf	
2020	Mike Barry	Action Tank: Book 2	Mike Barry Was Here	
2020	Pat Grant	The Grot	Top Shelf / IDW	
2020	Matt Stanton	The Odds	ABC Books	
2021	Zana Fraillon* (writer) & Phil Lesnie* (illustrator)	The Curiosities	Hachette Australia	
2021	Jason Pamment	Treasure in the Lake	Allen & Unwin	
2021	Ben Slabak (writer) & Edoardo Natalini (illustrator)	Mechanix	Cloud 9	
2021	Matthew Soall (writer) & Ignacio Di Meglio (illustrator)	Killeroo: Semper Fidelis	OzComics	
2022	Matt Ottley	The Tree of Ecstasy and Unbearable Sadness	Dirt Lane	
2022	Scott Wilson, Katie Houghton-Ward & Justin Randall	Dark Heart #1	Gesalt	
2022	Tom Taylor & Jon Sommariva	Neverlanders	Penguin Random House	
2022	David Hazan	Nottingham Vol. 2: A King's Ransom	Mad Cave	
2023	Jason Pamment	Ember and the Island of Lost Creatures	Allen and Unwin	
2023	Jason Franks & Tam Morris	Frankenstein Monstrance Preview #1	IPI Comics	
2023	Christof Bogacs & Beck Kubrick	MEAT4BURGERS	(self-published)	
2023	David Hazan & Cecilia Lo Valvo	Monomyth	Mad Cave	
2024	Chris Gooch	In Utero	IDW Publishing	
2024	Mike Barry	Action Tank: Book 3	Mike Barry Was Here	
2024	Henry Goeldner	The Star Tide Shores	Kickstarter	
2024	N. S. Kane, illus. by Chris Pitcairn	Your Highness, Your Highness	N. S. Kane Comics	
2024	Sarah Winifred Searle	The Sweetness Between Us	Allen & Unwin	
2024	Tom Taylor, illus. by Travis Moore	Titans: Out of the Shadows	DC Comics	
2025	Tull Swannakit	Higher Ground	New Frontier	
2025	Robin French	Bad Friend	Feral Rainbow	
2025	Mark Rafidi & Paul O'Sullivan	The Photographer	Hawkeye	
2025	Ariel Slamet Ries	Strange Bedfellows	HarperCollins	
2025	Tamlyn Teow	SoXiety	Riveted Press	

== See also ==
- Ditmar Award, an Australian science fiction award established in 1969
