= Gary Chaloner =

Australian comic book artist and writer

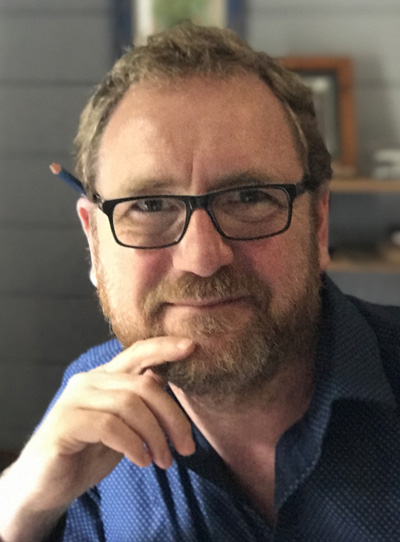
- Gary Chaloner in 2017.
- Born: Gary George Chaloner; 30 March 1963 (age 63); Campsie, New South Wales, Australia
- Education: St. Mel's Primary School, Campsie, De La Salle College, Kingsgrove, KvB Institute
- Occupations: cartoonist, writer, artist, publisher, designer
- Spouse: Belinda née Prideaux
- Children: one son, one stepson
- Writing career
- Period: 1982 – present
- Genres: Adventure, Crime, Pulp Fiction
- Website: garychaloner.com

Gary Chaloner (born 30 March 1963, in Sydney) is an Australian comic book artist, writer and publisher. He is known for his creations The Jackaroo, Flash Damingo, Red Kelso and The Undertaker Morton Stone, as well as his work on Will Eisner's John Law.

Chaloner began self publishing in 1985 with David de Vries, Glenn Lumsden and Tad Pietrzykowski under the Cyclone Comics imprint.

In 1989 he illustrated an issue of Mike Baron's Badger (issue #58 published by First Comics in January 1990). Chaloner undertook the artwork on Eternity Comics' Ninja High School (issue 17 published February 1990). He was the writer/artist of Planet of the Apes: Urchak's Folly (with Dillon Naylor and Greg Gates) by Adventure Comics in October 1990. Together with writer, Stephen Jewell, Chaloner illustrated Epic Comics’ The Olympians published in 1991–1992.

In 1994 Chaloner was the Australian editor for Dark Horse Comics' limited three issue Dark Horse Down Under, which included his creation, The Undertaker Morton Stone, with artist, Ashley Wood. He also worked for Marvel Comics (inking part of the "Of Leather and Lace" story in Generation X Annual 1995).

In 2002, he worked with Will Eisner to develop new stories featuring the Eisner creations John Law, Lady Luck and Mr. Mystic. These stories were first published online on the now-defunct comics collective site, Modern Tales, and then were published in print in 2004 by IDW Publishing. He also worked for DC Comics (artwork on the "Batman vs. Manhunter" story in Power Company issue #15 published October 2003).

In 2005, he inaugurated the Ledger Awards (now known as the Comic Arts Awards of Australia), Australian comic book awards that 'acknowledge excellence and achievement in Australian comic arts and publishing'. In 2023, he stood down from the Comic Arts Awards' organising committee, citing a need to refocus on his health, and creating and publishing new comic book material.

In 2013 was the writer and artist on Breckinridge Elkins: Mountain Man in issues #7-9 of Dark Horse Comics’ Robert E. Howard's Savage Sword, published in February–September 2013 in the United States

Other projects of note include covers and illustrations for Tim Byrd's Doc Wilde and the Frogs of Doom (published in 2013 by Outlaw Moon Books), Cyclone Force (with Tim McEwen, Tad Pietrzykowski and Graeme Jackson), and Proud Heart: The Love of Achilles, with writer Gary Proudley (Gestalt Publishing – January 2014), Unmasked (Gestalt Comics – April 2015), Astro City (issue #28 published in October 2015 by Vertigo Comics). In 2016 he produced the cover art for Frew Publications' The Phantom (issue #1755), the first Phantom story to be set on Australian soil.

In 2015 The Undertaker Morton Stone Vol. 1 was a finalist in the Aurealis Award for best illustrated book or graphic novel, an annual literary award for Australian science fiction, fantasy and horror fiction.

He was the 2017 recipient of the Jim Russell Award, made to the individual or organisation who in the opinion of the Australian Cartoonist's Association Board has made a significant contribution to Australian cartooning.

Across 2017–18, he published nine issues of Cyclone Redux: The Adventures of Flash Damingo and The Jackaroo under the Cyclone Comics imprint. These issues reprinted his material from earlier Cyclone Comics editions.

His current projects under the Cyclone Comics imprint include Adventure Illustrated (an anthology featuring 'Cyclone Force', 'Red Kelso', and 'Greener Pastures' by Michael Michalandos and Tim McEwen), The Undertaker Morton Stone (with artists Ryan Vella, Jason Paulos, Matthew Dunn and Dillon Naylor), and The Jackaroo.

In July 2021, he was diagnosed with Parkinson's disease.

He currently resides in Tasmania, Australia.

== Tribute ==
In issues 10-12 of DC Comics Manhunter (published July 1988 – April 1990) writer John Ostrander introduces two supporting characters, Gary DeVries and David Chaloner, operators of the Southern Cross Salvage Company. The characters re-appear in issues 21-24, written by Kim Yale.
