= The Example (comics) =

- Date: May 2009
- Page count: 20 pages
- Publisher: Gestalt Comics

Creative team
- Writers: Tom Taylor
- Artists: Colin Wilson
- ISBN: 0977562840

The Example is a graphic novel from Gestalt Publishing written by Tom Taylor and illustrated by Colin Wilson based on the award-winning play of the same name by Tom Taylor. The novel was described alongside the comics anthology Flinch in an article published in The Australian:

The Example, a story about a man, a woman and their reactions to an abandoned briefcase on a railway platform, was first performed at Melbourne's Short and Sweet play competition in 2005, where it won first prize. It has since been performed across Australia, in the US, Singapore and Britain, including at the Edinburgh Fringe Festival. The play, with its humorous meditation on terrorism, paranoia and personal responsibility, also has been taught in schools and universities. The action never leaves the confines of the platform and the characters do not do anything dramatic, yet the work is full of suspense. The image of the briefcase sits at the centre of the nine-frame grid, growing slightly larger with each turning page.

— Fiona Gruber, The Australian

== Publication history ==
The play of The Example won the 'Best Dramatic Writing' Award and others in the 2005 Shift and Sweet competition. Tom Taylor and Colin Wilson began adapting the play into comic book form in 2007. Gestalt Publishing published The Example in 2009. It was optioned by Bravada Films in 2010.

== Plot ==
Two people meet on Flinders Street railway station in Melbourne and are confronted by an unattended briefcase. What follows is an examination of the nature of racism, suspicion and fear.
