= Justice League/Mighty Morphin Power Rangers =

2017 comic book crossover series

Publication information
- Publisher: DC Comics; Boom Studios
- Format: Limited series
- Publication date: January – September 2017
- No. of issues: 6
- Main character(s): Justice League; Mighty Morphin Power Rangers

Creative team
- Written by: Tom Taylor
- Artist: Stephen Byrne

Justice League/Mighty Morphin Power Rangers is a 2017 comic book intercompany crossover series featuring DC Comics' Justice League and Saban and Toei's Power Rangers, written by Tom Taylor with art by Stephen Byrne, published by DC Comics and Boom Studios.

== Synopsis ==
Lord Zedd attacks the Command Center with an army of Putties and Zack arrives to defend it and Zordon. During his attempt to teleport them out, the teleportation relay is destroyed by a fake Alpha 5 with a bomb implanted in him. This causes the teleportation to malfunction and send Zack, Lord Zedd and the Putties to cross dimensions, where a "Dark" and familiar figure witnesses their arrival. The Power Rangers teleport to the same coordinates Zack went to and end up stranded in the DC Universe, a world where superpowered heroes are an everyday thing and villains are almost as powerful as the monsters that Rita and Zedd create.

== Plot ==
When the Power Rangers are informed by Zordon that Alpha 5 is missing, Zack discovers a decoy that explodes when brought to the Command Center, letting Lord Zedd and his Putties attack. Zack uses the malfunctioning teleportation array to unintentionally send Zedd and himself to different parts of the DC Universe, where Zack encounters Batman. Calling in reinforcements to fight between the other Power Rangers and Justice League members – Flash, Cyborg, Superman, Green Lantern, and Wonder Woman – the two sides realize they're both heroes of their respective worlds, while Zedd is captured in one of Brainiac's bottle habitats and the villains agree to work together.

Zedd creates giant monsters that attack all over the Earth, and the heroes split up to defeat them, but Brainiac hacks the Watchtower's teleporters and takes the Rangers' Power Coins, communicators, and Zords for himself. With no way for the Rangers to get home, the Justice League helps them create a portal using their reality's hadron collider, and they arrive to see Angel Grove being shrunken and collected by Brainiac's ship. The de-powered Rangers gear up with suits and weapons of various DC figures, and half of them defend Earth from Zedd's monsters while the others attack the ship, getting their Power Coins back as Cyborg is infected by Brainiac. Billy is forced to stab Cyborg so Batman can reboot him, and Superman helps them save the real Alpha 5, who Brainiac wanted to keep as a fellow sentient machine.

Using one of Zedd's Growth Bombs, Alpha 5 enlarges himself to fight the monsters, and Brainiac corrupts Cyborg again, only to be infected with a virus from Billy that destroys his forces and frees the Zords from his control. In a last-ditch effort, Zedd makes himself giant and dispatches the Justice League, but the Rangers' Megazord and Alpha 5 are able to triumph over him. The heroes then return Angel Grove to normal, celebrating at the Juice Bar and exchanging communicators before the Justice League leaves, with no one realizing that Brainiac has overtaken Alpha 5.

== Reception ==
The comic received mixed to positive critical reviews.

On Comic Book Roundup, the critics review was 7.1/10, while the audience review was 7.3/10.

== Publications ==
- Justice League/Mighty Morphin Power Rangers (2017-12-06 (hardcover), 2018-11-21 (softcover): Includes Justice League/Mighty Morphin Power Rangers #1-6.
