= Cyclone! =

Australian superhero anthology comic series

- Front cover of Cyclone Comics Quarterly No. 1.

Publication information
- Publisher: Cyclone Comics; Malibu Comics
- Schedule: irregular
- Publication date: 1985–1992
- ISSN: 1034-4640

Creative team
- Created by: David de Vries; Gary Chaloner; Glenn Lumsden; Tad Pietrzykowski
- Artist(s): David de Vries; Gary Chaloner; Glenn Lumsden; Tad Pietrzykowski

Cyclone! is an Australian superhero anthology comic book originally published in 1985.

The title features four ongoing stories:

- The Dark Nebula, a cosmic superhero title by Tad Pietrzykowski
- The Golden Age Southern Cross a superhero title by Tad Pietrzykowski and Glenn Lumsden
- The Jackaroo (known as Harry and the New Heroes in the first issue) by Gary Chaloner
- The Southern Squadron, a superhero team created by David de Vries with art by de Vries, Gary Chaloner and Glen Lumsden

The initial run of Cyclone! was eight issues, after which the anthology format was dispensed with and was renamed Southern Squadron.

== Characters ==
=== Southern Squadron ===
The Southern Squadron was Australia's first published superhero team. The classic lineup of The Southern Squadron comprises the following members:

- Lieutenant Christine Smith, a female former member of a special ops force for the Australian SAS, was selected by the Australian military as the commander of the squad of super powered operatives to face unusual situations. She carries no weapons preferring to take those from her enemies in the midst of combat, she wears a uniform made from a polymer fabric developed by the CSIRO that is impervious to small arms fire but does not restrict movement.
- Nightfighter, a former Australian soldier, Adam West, volunteered to be part of a program to create a super soldier. A virus introduced into his bloodstream allows him to gain super strength when adrenaline runs through his body (whenever he is angry, stressed, or afraid). He is a beer-swilling ocker from Melbourne, who according to his creator, David de Vries, is a combination of Hulk and Batman. The Nightfighter's battle cry "Hold on to your braincells!" is a homage to the Thing's trademark "It's clobbering time".
- Southern Cross is a young, trendy North Shore fashion designer, Bertram Davis, from Sydney with psychokinetic powers. His ability has been significantly amplified by an implant (developed by the CSIRO), that works in conjunction with his cane as a power supply, allowing him to fly at high speeds and move heavy objects.
- Dingo, Costas Borgas, is the werewolf son of a Serbian immigrant. Dingo fills a similar sort of role to that of the Beast in X-Men, or the Thing in the Fantastic Four, according to his creator, David de Vries.

Front cover of The Southern Squadron #13

The Southern Squadron was formed by the government of Australia, in 1982, to deal with superpowered crime and to give local superheroes guidance, training and legal authority. The Southern Squadron are based in Canberra, Australia. They cooperate closely with their New Zealand counterparts, the Waitangi Rangers. The supervisor/advisor to the squadron is Colonel Ralph Rivers (formerly the Crimson Comet, a winged superhero from the golden age of Australian comics). The squadron is occasionally joined by Flash Damingo, an alien bi-pedal platypus with a cybernetic arm and a former member of the Space Rangers.

The Southern Squadron was also published in America as two four issue miniseries, The Southern Squadron (1990) from Aircel and The Southern Squadron: Freedom of Information Act (1992) from Eternity, reprinting stories from the original Australian stories as well as introducing entirely new material.

=== Dark Nebula ===
Front cover of Dark Nebula #1

The Dark Nebula receives his powers from the two souls that occupy the dead body of Colonel Mark Medula, an Australian astronaut, who on returning from a routine shuttle mission, encounters an alien war lord, Cerellus of the planet Caileu. Medula and Cerellus battle and kill each other and when their souls are brought before Death for final consignment they are instead melded within Medula's body. From Cerellus he receives psionic abilities (telepathy, telekinesis etc.), and from Medula he receives the dark fire (a powerful mystical force, which although Medula is unaware of it at the time he is descended from a long line of witches). There is a constant battle for control of the host body with Cerellus constantly attempting to take over Medula's body at every opportunity.

The character debuted in a graphic novel titled The Dynamic Dark Nebula in 1982. The character subsequently appeared in Cyclone! for eight issues before being given its own respective title in February 1989. The Dark Nebula ran for eight issues, with The Golden Age Southern Cross as the back-up feature. The character was then included in several short stories in Southern Aurora Comics Presents.

=== The Jackaroo ===
Front cover of Jackaroo #1

The Jackaroo is Jack Keegan, a hard-nosed, adaptive bare-knuckles fighter. The character first appeared in issue No. 5 of Cyclone!, published in January 1989.

The Jackaroo was given his own title in May 1989, while it was intended to be a three issue mini-series only a single issue was published. The Jackaroo was also released as a three issue miniseries published by the American company Eternity Comics, reworked from various stories originally published in Australia. The character also appeared in issue No. 17 of Ninja High School published in February 1990.

== Subsequent publications ==
In 1989, Cyclone Comics also published a limited run called G.I. Joe Australia, reprinting stories from the Marvel series with some additional Australian material. The Cyclone name returned in 1992 when Gary Chaloner launched Cyclone Comics Quarterly with new characters. It ran for four issues. The first issue included a solo adventure of Flash Damingo, an occasional member of Southern Squadron, and a new character Morton Stone: Undertaker.

The original Cyclone! characters have undergone something of a revival with the launching of The Dark Nebula webcomic in 2006. The website has been operation for a little over two years. This webcomic currently includes Dark Nebula, the Golden Age Southern Cross and The Southern Squadron. The new series of The Dark Nebula, The Southern Cross & The Southern Squadron graphic novels are also available on-line through Web Comics Nation.
