= Tom Taylor (writer) =

Australian comic book author

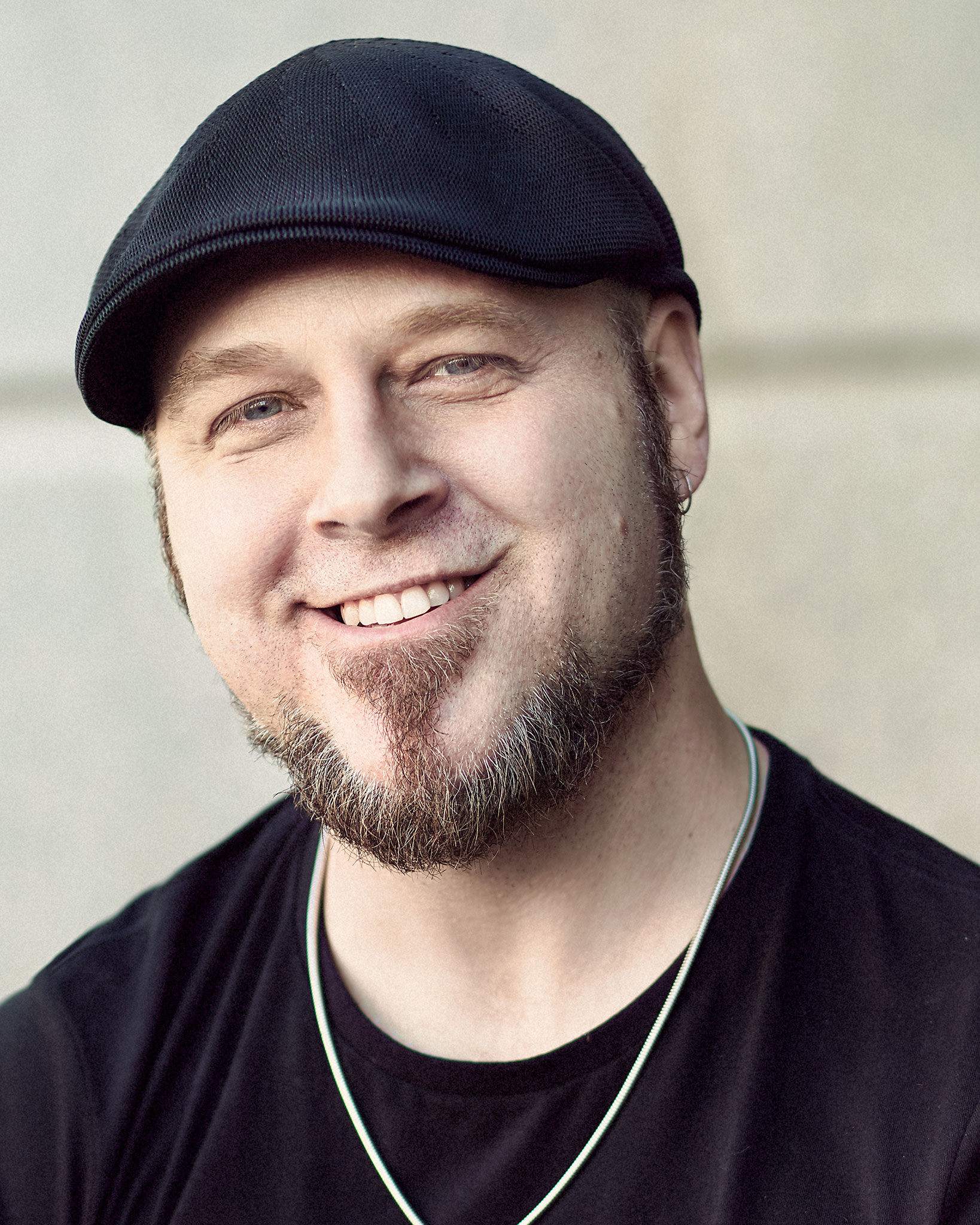
- Taylor in 2017
- Born: Melbourne, Victoria, Australia
- Area: Writer
- Notable works: The Deep (TV series); Neverlanders; Injustice: Gods Among Us; DCeased; All-New Wolverine; Nightwing; X-Men Red; Star Wars: Blood Ties; Superman: Son of Kal-El; The Example
- Awards: Eisner Award for Best Continuing Series Children's Book of the Year Award 'Aurealis Award for Best illustrated book/graphic novel' 'Stan Lee Excelsior Award' and others.

Tom Taylor is an Australian comic book writer, playwright and screenwriter. A #1 New York Times bestselling author, his work includes DC Comics series Injustice, DCeased, Nightwing, Superman, Suicide Squad, and the Marvel series All-New Wolverine, X-Men Red, Superior Iron Man and Star Wars comics.

Taylor is the co-creator, writer and executive producer of the animated series The Deep, based on his graphic novels of the same name.

== Life and career ==
Taylor was born in Melbourne, Australia. Writing many works for DC Comics, Marvel and Star Wars, Taylor is the creator, with James Brouwer, of the all-ages adventure graphic novel The Deep: Here Be Dragons and its sequel The Vanishing Island published by Gestalt Publishing and Boom! Studios. The Deep was optioned by Technicolor. 65 episodes have screened of the CG animated series, across four seasons, with Taylor serving as the co-creator, head writer and executive producer.

In 2012, The Deep: Here Be Dragons won the Aurealis Award for Best illustrated book/graphic novel, Australia's premier speculative fiction literary award. The sequel, The Vanishing Island, won the award again in 2014.

Taylor is also the co-creator of Seven Secrets which, at the time of its release, was the highest launching original series in the history of Boom! Studios.

Taylor has written X-Men: Red, All-New Wolverine and Hunt for Wolverine Adamantium Agenda for Marvel Comics, along with Justice League/Power Rangers and Injustice 2 for DC Comics. He has also written Batman/Superman, Titans and Earth Two.

Performing and writing for theatre and musicals from the age of fourteen, Tom's works have been produced across four continents. His plays have won a number of awards and accolades including winning the award for 'Best Dramatic Writing' in Short and Sweet – The world's largest short play festival.

His plays have been produced at the Sydney Opera House, Arts Centre Melbourne and the Edinburgh Fringe.

Taylor is well known for his many Star Wars comics and graphic novels for Dark Horse Comics. These include, Star Wars: Blood Ties with artist Chris Scalf, and Star Wars: Invasion, with illustrator Colin Wilson. April 2012 saw the start of Taylor and Scalf's new Blood Ties series provocatively titled Boba Fett is Dead as reported by CNN. Taylor is also the writer of the Darth Maul: Death Sentence miniseries, which is set immediately after the end of the fourth Clone Wars television series.

Star Wars: Blood Ties won the 2012 Stan Lee Excelsior Award, as voted for by thousands of school students across the UK.

Taylor wrote the graphic novella, Star Wars Adventures: Luke Skywalker and the Treasure of the Dragonsnakes which shows a never before seen story of Luke Skywalker training with Yoda on Dagobah during The Empire Strikes Back. Taylor also penned Star Wars Adventures: The Will of Darth Vader. Dark Horse Vice President Randy Stradley says that Tom Taylor has taken to writing comics faster than anyone he's ever seen.

Taylor also wrote The Authority, published under the Wildstorm imprint, starting with issue #22 in May 2010 until the end of the Wildstorm imprint. He also wrote The Brainiac / Sinestro Corps war storyline in the pages of DC Universe Online: Legends, a Batman story with artist Nicola Scott and Rose and Thorn with artist Neil Googe.

Taylor's award-winning play The Example has also been adapted into a comic book with illustration by Colin Wilson through Gestalt Publishing.

In December 2020, it was announced that Taylor would be the new writer on the Nightwing solo series with artist Bruno Redondo illustrating.

In October 2021, on National Coming Out Day, Taylor announced that the character Jon Kent, the son of Superman in the comic book series Superman: Son of Kal-El will be bisexual.

In 2023, Taylor's Neverlanders, with Jon Sommariva, became the first graphic novel to win the Children's Book of the Year Award: Older Readers.

In February 2024, it was announced that Taylor and Redondo's run on Nightwing would enter its final story arc with Nightwing (vol. 4) #114. This five-part story arc titled "Fallen Grayson" would begin in May 2024. In all, Taylor and Redondo's run encompassed over 40 issues.

== Bibliography ==
=== DC Comics ===
- Dark Knights of Steel II (with art by Otto Schmidt, DC Comics, 2026)
- Detective Comics Annual 2026 (with art by Nicola Scott, DC Comics, 2026)
- Necretaceous (with art by Darick Robertson, DC Comics, Vertigo Comics, 2026–)
- "Absolute Cash-In" in Mad About DC #1 (with art by Bruno Redondo, DC Comics, 2026)
- C.O.R.T. Children of the Round Table #1–6 (with art by Daniele Di Nicuolo, DC Comics, 2025–2026)
- "Sticks & Snikts" in Batman/Deadpool #1 (with art by Bruno Redondo, DC Comics, 2025)
- Detective Comics #1090– (with art by Mikel Janin, DC Comics, 2024-)
- Titans: Beast World #1–6 (with art by Ivan Reis, DC Comics, 2023-2024)
- Dark Knights of Steel: Allwinter #1–6 (back up stories with art by Riccardo Federicci, DC Comics, 2024)
- Batman – One Bad Day: Ra's Al Ghul (with art by Ivan Reis, DC Comics, 2023)
- Adventures of Superman: Jon Kent #1–6 (with art by Clayton Henry, DC Comics, 2023)
- Titans #1–15 (with art by Nicola Scott, DC Comics, 2023–2024)
- DCeased: War of the Undead Gods #1–8 (with art by Trevor Hairsine, DC Comics, 2022–2023)
- Action Comics #1050 (with art by Clayton Henry, DC Comics, 2022)
- Superman: Son of Kal-El #1–18 (with art by John Timms, Cian Tormey, DC Comics, 2021–2022)
  - Superman: Son of Kal-El – The Truth – Collects Superman: Son of Kal-El #1–6 (with art by Bruno Redondo, DC Comics, 2022) ISBN 9781779515322)
  - Superman: Son of Kal-El Volume 2 – The Rising – Collects Superman: Son of Kal-El #7–10, Nightwing #89, and Superman: Son of Kal-El 2021 Annual #1 (with art by Cian Tormey and Bruno Redondo, DC Comics, 2022) ISBN 9781779517388)
  - Superman: Son of Kal-El Volume 3 - Battle for Gamorra – Collects Superman: Son of Kal-El #11-15 (with art by Cian Tormey, Ruiari Coleman, DC Comics, 2023) ISBN 9781779520074)
- Nightwing #78 – #118 (with art by Bruno Redondo, DC Comics, 2021-2024)
  - Nightwing Leaping into the Light – Collects Nightwing #78–83 (with art by Bruno Redondo, DC Comics, 2021) ISBN 9781779512789)
  - Nightwing Fear State – Collects Nightwing #84–86 and Nightwing annual (with art by Robbi Rodriguez and Cian Tormey, DC Comics, 2022) ISBN 9781779515506)
  - Nightwing Volume 2: Get Grayson – Collects Nightwing #87–91 and Superman: Son of Kal-El #9 (with art by Bruno Redondo, DC Comics, 2021) ISBN 9781779517456)
  - Nightwing Volume 3: The Battle for Bludhaven's Heart – Collects Nightwing #92–96 (with art by Bruno Redondo, DC Comics, 2022) ISBN 9781779520166)
  - Nightwing Volume 4: The Leap – Collects Nightwing #97–100 and Nightwing 2022 Annual (with art by Bruno Redondo, Daniele Di Nicuolo, DC Comics, 2023) ISBN 9781779520869)
- Batman The Detective #1–6 (with art by Andy Kubert, DC Comics, 2021 ISBN 9781779514189)
- Dark Knights of Steel #1–12 (with art by Yasmine Putri, DC Comics, 2021-2023)
  - Volume One Collects #1–6 (with art by Yasmine Putri, DC Comics, 2022) ISBN 978-1779516756)
  - Volume Two Collects #7–12 (with art by Yasmine Putri, DC Comics, 2023) ISBN 978-1779520791)
- Green Arrow: 80th Anniversary #1 (with Art by Nicola Scott, DC Comics, 2021)
- Superman: Son of Kal-El Annual – (with art by Steve Pugh, DC Comics, 2021)
- Nightwing Annual – (with art by Cian Tormey, DC Comics, 2021)
- Hellblazer: Rise and Fall #1–3 (with art by Darick Robertson, DC Comics, 2020–2021, ISBN 9781779504661)
- DCeased: Dead Planet issues #1–7 (with art by Trevor Hairsine, DC Comics, 2020–2021, ISBN 9781779507952)
- The Joker 80th Anniversary #1 (with art by Eduardo Risso, DC Comics, 2020)
- Injustice Year Zero Chapters #1–14 (with art by Roge Antonio and Cian Tormey, DC Comics, 2020–2021) ISBN 9781779511294)
- DCeased: Hope at World's End #1–15 (with art by various, DC Comics, 2020) ISBN 9781779511287)
- Aquaman Giant #3 (with art by Pop Mhan, DC Comics, 2020)
- DCeased: Unkillables Issues #1–3 (with art by Karl Mosert, DC Comics, 2020, ISBN 9781779503930)
- Suicide Squad #1–11 (with art by Bruno Redondo, DC Comics, 2019–2020), ISBN 9781779503954)
- Detective Comics #1017 (with art by Fernando Blanco, DC Comics, 2019)
- DCeased issues #1–6 (with art by Trevor Hairsine, DC Comics, 2019, ISBN 9781401294403)
- Year of the Villain: Black Mask (with art by Cully Hamner, DC Comics, 2019)
- DCeased: A Good Day to Die #1 (with art by Laura Braga and Darick Robertson, DC Comics, 2019)
- DC Villains Giant (with art by Daniel Sampere), DC Comics, 2019)
- Injustice 2 Chapters #1–72 (with art by Bruno Redondo, DC Comics, 2017–2018)
- Batman Annual #3 (with art by Otto Schmidt, DC Comics, 2018)
- Batman Secret Files #1 (with art by Brad Walker, DC Comics, 2018)
- DC Nuclear Winter Special #1 (DC Comics, 2018)
- Justice League/Power Rangers Issues #1–6 (with art by Stephen Byrne, DC Comics, 2017, ISBN 978-1401272005)
- Batman/Superman issues #28–30 (with Art by Robson Rocha, DC Comics, 2016)
- Green Lantern Corps: Edge of Oblivion Issues #1–6 (DC Comics, 2016)
- Injustice: Gods Among Us Annual #4 (with Art by Bruno Redondo, DC Comics, 2015)
- Injustice: Year Three Chapters #1–14 (with Art by Bruno Redondo, Mike S. Miller, and various, DC Comics, 2014–2015)
- Earth-2 Issues #17–29 (with Art by Nicola Scott, DC Comics, 2013–2014)
- Injustice: Year Two Chapters #1–24 (with Art by Bruno Redondo, Tom Derenick, and various), DC Comics, 2014)
- Earth-2 Annual #2 (with Art by Robson Rocha, DC Comics, 2014)
- Injustice: Gods Among Us Chapters #1–36 (with Art by Jheremy Rapaack and various, DC Comics, 2013, ISBN 978-1401245009)
- Injustice: Gods Among Us Annual #1 (with Art by Xermanico, and Bruno Redondo), DC Comics, 2013)
- Batman Legends of the Dark Knight – The Crime Never Committed (with Art by Nicola Scott), DC Comics, 2012)
- Rose and Thorn (with art by Neil Googe, DC Comics, 2012)
- DC Universe Online: Legends – The Brainiac/Sinestro Corps War (With art by Bruno Redondo, DC Comics, 2011)

=== Marvel ===
- Marvel's: Dark Ages #1–6 (with art by Iban Coello, 2021 – 2022)
- Deadpool: Black, White and Blood #1 (with art by Phil Noto, 2021)
- Star Wars:
  - Star Wars Legends: Boba Fett – Blood Ties (With art by Chris Scalf ISBN 978-1302932121)
  - Star Wars: Age of Resistance – Rey (2019)
  - Star Wars: Age of Resistance – Kylo Ren (2019)
  - Star Wars: Age of Resistance – Poe Dameron (2019)
  - Star Wars: Age of Resistance – Hux (2019)
  - Star Wars: Age of Resistance – Finn (2019)
  - Star Wars: Age of Resistance – Snoke (2019)
  - Star Wars: Age of Resistance – Rose Tico (2019)
- Immortal Hulk: Great Power (with art by Jorge Molina, 2020)
- Free Comic Book Day: X-Men (with Art by Iban Coello, 2020)
- Friendly Neighborhood Spider-Man #1–14 (with art by Juann Cabal, 2019)
- War of the Realms: Strikeforce – Land of Giants (with art by Jorge Molina, 2019)
- Free Comic Book Day: Spider-Man (with Art by Cory Smith, 2019)
- X-Men Red #1–11 (with art by Mahmud Asrar, 2018)
- Hunt for Wolverine: Adamantium Agenda #1–4 (with art by R.B. Silva, 2018)
- X-Men Red Annual (with art by Pascal Alixe, 2018)
- All-New Wolverine #1–35 (with art by Various, 2015–2018)
  - All-New Wolverine The Four Sisters – Collects All-New Wolverine #1–6 (with art by David López, 2015) ISBN 978-0785196525
  - All-New Wolverine Civil War II – Collects All-New Wolverine #7–12 (with art by Marcio Takara and Ig Guara, 2016) ISBN 978-0785196532
  - All-New Wolverine Enemy of the State II – Collects All-New Wolverine #13–18 (with art by Nik Virella and Djibril Morissete-Phan, 2017) ISBN 978-1302902902
  - All-New Wolverine Immune – Collects All-New Wolverine #19–24 (with art by Leonard Kirk, 2018) ISBN 978-1302909352
  - Generations: The Best (with art by Ramon Rosanas, 2017)
  - All-New Wolverine Annual (with art by Marcio Takara, 2016)
  - All-New Wolverine Orphans of X – Collects All-New Wolverine #25–30 (with art by Juann Cabal, 2018) ISBN 978-1302905613
  - All-New Wolverine Old Woman Laura – Collects All-New Wolverine #31-35
  - All-New Wolverine by Tom Taylor Omnibus (collects #1–35, Annual #1, Generations: Wolverine & All-New Wolverine, hc, 862 pages, 2021, ISBN 978-1302926441)
- Superior Iron Man #1–9 (with art by Yıldıray Çınar, 2014–2015)
- Secret Wars: Agents of Atlas #1 (with art by Steve Pugh, 2015)

=== Boom! Studios ===
- Seven Secrets #1–#18 (With art by Daniele Di Nicuolo, Boom! Studios, 2020–2021 ISBN 978-1684157068)
- The Deep #1–6 (reprint) (With art by James Brouwer, Boom! Studios, 2017 ISBN 978-1684152001)
- Power Rangers Annual (With art by Dan Mora, Boom! Studios, 2017)

=== Penguin Random House ===
- Neverlanders (with art by Jon Sommariva, 2022 ISBN 978-0593351710)

=== Dark Horse Comics ===
- Star Wars: Darth Maul – Death Sentence (with art by Bruno Redondo, Dark Horse Comics, 2012)
- Star Wars: Blood Ties – Boba Fett is Dead (with art by Chris Scalf, Dark Horse Comics, 2012)
- Star Wars: Invasion Volume 3: Revelations (with art by Colin Wilson, Dark Horse Comics, 2012, ISBN 1-59582-882-6)
- Star Wars: Invasion Volume 2: Rescues (with art by Colin Wilson, Dark Horse Comics, 2011, ISBN 1-59582-630-0)
- Star Wars Adventures: The Will of Darth Vader (Dark Horse Comics, 2010, ISBN 978-1-59582-435-6)
- Star Wars: Blood Ties – a tale of Jango and Boba Fett (with art by Chris Scalf, Dark Horse Comics, 2010, ISBN 1-59582-627-0)
- Star Wars Adventures: Luke Skywalker and The Treasure of the Dragonsnakes (with art by Da Xiong, Dark Horse Comics, 2010, ISBN 1-59582-347-6)
- Star Wars: Invasion Volume 1: Refugees (with art by Colin Wilson, Dark Horse Comics, 2009, ISBN 1-59582-479-0)

=== Gestalt Publishing ===
- M.I.D.A.S. (With art by Mikiko Ponczeck, Gestalt Publishing, 2015)
- The Deep: The Vanishing Island (With art by James Brouwer, Gestalt Publishing, 2013, ISBN 978-1-922023-05-6)
- The Deep: Here Be Dragons (With art by James Brouwer, Gestalt Publishing, 2011, ISBN 0-9807823-4-1)
- The Example (with art by Colin Wilson, Gestalt Publishing, 2009, ISBN 0-9775628-4-0)
- Flinch (with art by Tom Bonin and Colin Wilson, Gestalt Publishing, 2009, ISBN 0-9775628-3-2)
- Rombies (art by Skye Ogden, Gestalt Publishing, 2009, ISBN 0-9775628-8-3)
- Brief Cases (Various artists, Gestalt Publishing, 2012)

=== Wildstorm ===
- The Authority #22–29 (with art by Al Barrionuevo, DC/Wildstorm, 2010)

=== IDW Publishing ===
- In the Dark Anthology: In Plain Sight (with art by Mack Chater, IDW Publishing, 2014)
- Jinnrise #3 (with art by Mark Torres, IDW Publishing, 2013)
- Rocketeer Adventures – Work To Do (with art by Colin Wilson, IDW Publishing, 2012)

=== 2000 AD ===
- Tharg's 3rillers: 15 (with art by Jon Davis-Hunt, 2000 AD #1797–1799, 2012)

== Film and television ==
=== The Deep TV series ===
Taylor is the co-creator, executive producer and head writer of The Deep. The first series began airing on Netflix USA in 2016.

Four seasons (65 episodes) of The Deep have screened globally in over 130 territories, notably on Netflix and CBBC. The Deep has been the number #1 rated animated series in several territories, including the UK and Greece.

=== Neverlanders Feature film ===
In November 2025, Deadline Hollywood announced an animated feature film adaptation of Tom Taylor's Neverlanders graphic novels was in the works at Pixel Zoo, with Taylor set to pen the screenplay.

=== Injustice: Gods Among Us ===
The 2021 film Injustice is part of the DC Universe Animated Original Movies line. The film is based on the Injustice: Year One comics by Taylor and the first game, Injustice: Gods Among Us.

=== Cleverman ===
Taylor joined the writer's room of Cleverman for the third season

=== The Example ===
Taylor wrote the film adaptation of The Example which was optioned and filmed by Staple Fiction in 2011.

=== A4 to A3 ===
Taylor's award-winning short musical A4 to A3 (written with Simon Barlow) was filmed by Bravada Films in 2009, for which Taylor also wrote the screenplay. A4 to A3 premiered at the Newport Beach Film Festival on 29 April 2010.

== Awards and nominations ==
=== Won ===
- 2025 Prix Des Collegiens De La Somme (for Neverlanders)
- 2024 Eisner Award for Best Single Issue/One-Shot (for Nightwing: #105: 'You are Nightwing')
- 2023 Children's Book of the Year for Older Readers (for Neverlanders)
- 2023 Eisner Award for Best Continuing Series (for Nightwing)
- 2023 Comic Arts Award of Australia (for Neverlanders)
- 2022 AEAF Award - TV Series - Children (for The Deep Season 4)
- 2021 Comic Arts Award of Australia (for Suicide Squad: Bad Blood)
- 2020 Shadow Award for Best Graphic Novel (for Hellblazer: Rise and Fall)
- 2019 Shadow Award for Best Graphic Novel (for DCeased)
- 2018 Ledger Award (for Injustice 2)
- 2017 Goldener Spatz (Golden Sparrow) Award (for The Deep)
- 2017 Kidscreen 'Best New Series Award' (for The Deep)
- 2014 IGN 'Best Digital Series' (for Injustice: Gods Among Us)
- 2014 IGN 'People's Choice Award' (for Injustice: Gods Among Us)
- 2013 Winner 'Aurealis Award' for Best illustrated book/graphic novel' (for The Deep: The Vanishing Island)
- 2013 IGN 'People's Choice Award for Best Digital Series' (for Injustice: Gods Among Us)
- 2012 Winner 'Stan Lee Excelsior Award' (for Star Wars: Blood Ties)
- 2012 Winner 'Aurealis Award for Best illustrated book/graphic novel' (for The Deep: Here Be Dragons)
- 2007 Winner Short, Sweet and Song People's Choice Award – 'A4 2 A3' Short, Sweet and Song – Sydney AUS 2007
- 2005 Winner 'Best Dramatic Writing' Short and Sweet – (For 'The Example')

=== Nominations ===
- 2025 Eisner Award for Best Continuing Series (for Detective Comics)
- 2025 Aurealis Award for best illustrated book or graphic novel (for Titans: Out of the Shadows)
- 2025 ASLA DANZ Children's Book Award (for Neverlanders)
- 2024 Eisner Award for Best Writer
- 2024 GLAAD Media Award for Outstanding Comic Book (for Adventures of Superman: Jon Kent)
- 2024 Eisner Award for Best Continuing Series (for Nightwing)
- 2024 The Dragon Award for Best Comic Book (for Nightwing)
- 2023 Aurealis Award for best illustrated book or graphic novel (for Neverlanders)
- 2023 Eisner Award for Best Limited Series (for Batman: One Bad Day)
- 2023 Excelsior Award (for Dark Knights of Steel)
- 2023 GLAAD Media Award for Outstanding Comic Book (for Superman: Son of Kal-el)
- 2022 Ringo Award for Best Writer
- 2022 Eisner Award for Best Continuing Series (for Nightwing)
- 2022 GLAAD Media Award for Outstanding Comic Book (for Superman: Son of Kal-El)
- 2022 The Dragon Award for Best Comic Book (for Nightwing)
- 2022 Eisner Award for Best Single Issue/One-Shot (for Nightwing: #87: 'Get Grayson')
- 2020 British Fantasy Award for Best Comic/Graphic Novel (for DCeased)
- 2020 GLAAD Media Award for Outstanding Comic Book (for Suicide Squad)
- 2019 BAFTA AWARD 'Best International Animation' (for The Deep)
- 2019 IGN 'Best Limited Comic Book or Miniseries' (for DCeased)
- 2017 IGN 'Best Comic Book Writer'
- 2017 IGN 'Best Comic Book Series' (for All-New Wolverine)
- 2017 IGN 'Best New Series' (for Injustice 2)
- 2017 IGN 'Best Limited Comic Book or Miniseries' (for Justice League/Power Rangers)
- 2016 Australian Writer's Guild Industry Award for best Children's Television (for The Deep – Episode Five – Devil's Sea Mystery)
- 2016 AACTA Award for Best Children's Television Series (for The Deep)
- 2015 Australian Writer's Guild Industry Award for best Children's Television (for The Deep – Episode Four – Digging Deeper)
- 2015 The John Hinde Award for Excellence in Science-Fiction Writing (for The Deep (2015 TV series))
- 2009 Diamond Gem Award (for Star Wars: Invasion)
- Finalist – 2008 Bite-Size UK International Playwriting Competition (for A Short Play for a Competition)
- 2008 Short and Sweet – Nominated for Best Comedy Script and Best Production (for Falling, Praying)
- Finalist 2005 'Write Now' National Young Playwright Award -(for My Month as a Member)

== Theatrical works ==
- THE EXAMPLE
  - Sydney Opera House (Sydney AUS 2006)
  - Edinburgh Festival (Edinburgh, Scotland 2008)
  - The Edge Performing Arts Centre (Auckland, New Zealand 2010)
  - The Esplanade (Singapore 2006)
  - Brighton Festival Fringe (Brighton England 2006)
  - Brisbane Powerhouse (QLD AUS 2008)
  - Melbourne Arts Centre (Melbourne AUS 2005)
  - Seymour Centre (Sydney AUS 2006)
  - Araluen Arts Centre (Alice Springs N.T. 2008)
  - Darwin Entertainment Centre Darwin Australia 2008
  - Cairns Civic Theatre (QLD Australia 2008)
  - Rockhampton Performing Arts Centre QLD AUS 2008
  - Canberra Theatre Centre (ACT AUS 2008)
- DRIP
  - Stratton Players (Boston USA 2007)
  - Newtown Theatre (Sydney AUS 2009)
  - Carlton Courthouse (Melbourne Aus 2008)
- FALLING PRAYING
  - Edinburgh Fringe (Edinburgh, Scotland 2009)
  - Parade Playhouse National Institute of Dramatic Art (Sydney, AUS 2010)
  - Melbourne Arts Centre (Melbourne, Australia 2008)
- BELIEVE
  - Bite Size Theatre (Brighton England 2007)
  - Newtown Theatre (Sydney AUS 2007)
- PROTEST
  - Fairfax Theatre, Melbourne Arts Centre (Melbourne, Australia 2007)
  - Newtown Theatre (Sydney AUS 2007)
- MYSTERY FLIGHT
  - Chapel Off Chapel (Melbourne, Australia 2009)
- A4 2 A3 (with Simon Barlow)
  - National Institute of Dramatic Art (Sydney AUS 2007)
- CITY HEAD
  - Melbourne Trades Hall Melbourne AUS 2007
- NAZANIN
  - The BDP Ensemble (Brisbane AUS 2006)
- MY MONTH AS A MEMBER
  - Old Fitzroy Hotel Theatre (Sydney AUS 2005)
- THE RATINGS WAR (With Daniel Hall and Simon Barlow)
  - La Mama Theatre Melbourne Comedy Festival Melbourne AUS 2004
- CANDIDATE (With Daniel Hall, Simon Barlow and Joe Guiton)
  - La Mama Theatre Melbourne Comedy Festival (Melbourne AUS 2003)
- HARD RUBBISH WEEK (Script coordinator)
  - The Athenaeum Theatre (Melbourne AUS 2003)

| Preceded by Ram V | Detective Comics writer 2024–present | Incumbent |
| Preceded by Dan Jurgens | Nightwing writer 2021–present | Incumbent |
| Preceded by Tim Sheridan | Titans writer 2023–present | Incumbent |
| Preceded by Phillip Kennedy Johnson | Superman writer 2021–2022 | Succeeded by Joshua Williamson |
| Preceded by Peter David | Friendly Neighborhood Spider-Man writer 2019 | Succeeded by |
| Preceded by Rob Williams | Suicide Squad writer 2019–2020 | Succeeded by Robbie Thompson |
| Preceded by Kieron Gillen | Iron Man writer 2014–2015 | Succeeded by Brian Michael Bendis |
