= John Law (comics) =

Publication information
- Publisher: Will Eisner Studios, Inc
- First appearance: 1948
- Created by: Will Eisner

In-story information
- Full name: John Law
- Team affiliations: Crossroads Police Department
- Partnerships: Lady Luck, Mr. Mystic

John Law is a fictional character created by writer-artist Will Eisner in 1948. Law is an eyepatched, pipe smoking Crossroads Police Department detective, who, with his shoeshine boy sidekick Nubbin, was featured in an adventure planned for a new comic book series, but never published. The backup story was drawn by André LeBlanc. These completed stories were eventually adapted into Spirit stories, with John Law's eyepatch being changed to The Spirit's mask and Nubbin being redrawn to be Willum Waif, a Spirit supporting cast character.

The unpublished John Law story and the André LeBlanc backup were discovered by Catherine Yronwode among Eisner's original art files, and first saw print in 1983 from Eclipse Comics, under her editorship. They were next published in Will Eisner's John Law: Dead Man Walking (2004, IDW), a collection of stories that also features new adventures by writer/artist Gary Chaloner starring John Law, Nubbin, and many other Eisner-associated characters, including Lady Luck, created by Nick Cardy and Klaus Nordling, and Bob Powell's Mr. Mystic.
