= DCeased =

2019 comic book miniseries by DC Comics

- Cover of issue #1

Publication information
- Publisher: DC Comics
- Schedule: Monthly
- Format: Limited series
- Genre: Superhero
- Publication date: May–October 2019
- No. of issues: 6
- Main character(s): Lois Lane; Superman; Cyborg; Dinah Lance; Wonder Woman; Justice League; Damian Wayne; Jon Kent; Harley Quinn; Poison Ivy; Green Arrow; John Constantine

Creative team
- Written by: Tom Taylor
- Penciller: Trevor Hairsine
- Inker(s): Stefano Gaudiano; James Harren
- Letterer: Ken Lopez
- Colorist: Rain Beredo
- Editor: Ben Abernathy

Collected editions
- Hardcover: ISBN 9781401294403

DCeased is a six-issue comic book miniseries published by DC Comics from May to October 2019. It was created by writer Tom Taylor and the artistic team including penciler Trevor Hairsine and inker Stefano Gaudiano. The story takes place in an alternate Earth named Earth 55, where a corrupted version of the Anti-Life Equation has infected most of Earth's inhabitants with a zombie-like virus. Lois Lane acts as the series' narrator, detailing how the events took place over the course of a few weeks.

It was followed by several sequels and spin-offs each narrated by a different character.

== Publication history ==
The first issue was released in May 2019, and was ranked #1 in the comic book sales for that period. Issue two came in at #2 for the month of June at 152,407 units. Sales for issue three came in at #3 in July at 132,072 units, with issue four to six selling roughly 120,000 units each.

=== Expanded material ===
==== Spin-offs ====
- DCeased: A Good Day to Die #1 (2019)
- DCeased: Unkillables #1–3 (2019)
- DCeased: Hope at World's End #1–15 (2020)

==== Sequels ====
- DCeased: Dead Planet #1–7 (2020–2021)
- DCeased: War of the Undead Gods #1–8 (2022–2023)

== Plot ==
=== DCeased ===
In the aftermath of a battle with the forces of Apokolips, Batman discovers that Cyborg has been kidnapped. On Apokolips, Cyborg is being tortured by DeSaad, who reveals that one-half of the Anti-Life Equation exists within his body and that Darkseid intends to merge it with the half in his possession. Darkseid summons the Black Racer, who is restrained and has his essence extracted to keep Cyborg alive during the procedure. During the process, the Equation is corrupted and becomes a techno-organic virus that transforms those infected by it into zombie-like monsters known as the Anti-Living. The virus infects Darkseid, who kills the Black Racer and obliterates Apokolips.

When Cyborg returns to Earth, the virus spreads to Earth, infecting hundreds of millions of people instantly. Superman flies to his apartment and rescues his wife Lois Lane, his son Jon Kent, and Damian Wayne from being infected. Batman locates Alfred Pennyworth, Nightwing, and Tim Drake, discovering that Nightwing and Tim have been infected. Batman holds the two off so Alfred can escape, but is infected in the process.

Elsewhere, Aquaman is overwhelmed by a swarm of infected and both the Joker and Green Lantern (Hal Jordan) are infected from viewing corrupted screens. Green Lantern attacks Green Arrow and Black Canary. Black Canary is forced to kill Jordan while defending Green Arrow and is chosen by Jordan's power ring, becoming a Green Lantern. In Gotham, Batman succumbs to the infection and attacks Alfred, who shoots and kills him.

Superman heads for Smallville and meets with his adopted mother Martha Kent, who informs him that Jonathan Kent has been infected. Superman seals Jonathan in the basement of the barn before taking Martha to safety. Meanwhile, Mera is training Garth when they both notice the water above Atlantis darkening with the blood of Atlantean guards Aquaman has infected or killed. Garth inhales some of the blood and becomes infected, but is repelled by Mera.

In a Project Cadmus lab under Washington, D.C., Amanda Waller and Captain Atom await the return of Atom, who has entered an Anti-Living corpse to find a cure. However, they learn that Atom has become infected and is attacking Captain Atom's body to infect him, starting with his heart. Learning that Captain Atom is going to explode, Superman and Wonder Woman attempt to fly him into the atmosphere, where he can detonate safely. However, he explodes before they can do so, devastating Washington, D.C., Metropolis, and several other major cities.

Lex Luthor, saddened by the destruction of Metropolis, arrives and offers to join forces with Superman. Over the next few weeks, the heroes disable the Internet to stop the Equation's spread. Wonder Woman convinces her mother Hippolyta to allow survivors on Themyscira. Meanwhile, Damian (now operating as Batman), Green Arrow, and Green Canary meet with Poison Ivy to create a sanctuary in Gotham, and Luthor and Cyborg work together to build two space arks to leave Earth. However, an infected Martian Manhunter attacks the fortress, kills Luthor, and infects the Flash before being killed by Firestorm. Superman kills the Flash, but he is infected in the process.

As the infected Superman begins his attack in New York, Cyborg declares they must evacuate the planet, but Lois says Superman will destroy the arks and must be stopped first. Damian reveals that he possesses a shard of kryptonite, which he gives to Cyborg. Wonder Woman states that it will not be enough and they must use lethal force against Superman. She tells Green Lantern and Cyborg to come with her, while ordering everyone else to go to the Gotham Jungle and Themyscira to prepare for departure. In Superman's forge, Wonder Woman imbues her sword with magic and kryptonite, combining Superman's two principal weaknesses. Wonder Woman attacks Superman, but fails to kill him and is infected.

The Green Lantern Corps and the Guardians of the Universe arrive to stop Superman. Realizing that they are too powerful to take on alone, Superman retreats into the Sun and begins absorbing its energy. Ganthet states the Corps cannot stop him, and escorts the survivors to a new world to settle on.

On Earth, Cyborg interrogates Wonder Woman with the Lasso of Truth to find out if there is a cure, learning that the virus is sentient and controls its victims as a hive mind, and that the cure lies within his body. He attempts to message the arks, but is decapitated by Wonder Woman.

=== Spin-offs ===
==== A Good Day to Die ====
Mister Miracle and Big Barda survey the destruction of Apokolips before returning to Earth. Meanwhile, Mister Terrific examines an infected Captain Boomerang and realises he needs to trace the origin of the virus. He journeys to Mister Miracle's apartment to seek their aid in visiting Apokolips, only to be informed of its annihilation. Seeking another solution, Terrific, Miracle and Big Barda track down Blue Beetle and Booster Gold for transportation to England and rescue John Constantine from a horde of infected in Liverpool. Constantine states that there is no cure to the infection and refuses to help the heroes, teleporting himself away.

With technological and magical options expired, Mister Terrific theorises that the only hope for humanity is for Booster to use his time machine. Journeying to Malibu, they are attacked by an infected Fire and Ice, who seemingly kill Miracle and infect Barda. Booster and Blue Beetle locate the time machine, but Waverider appears and stops them from using it. Barda kills Terrific and infects Blue Beetle, and Booster fades from existence due to the timeline being altered. Constantine then attempts to sacrifice himself to stop Waverider before being rescued by Doctor Fate and Zatanna.

==== Unkillables ====
Deathstroke encounters infected neo-nazis and is infected, but his healing factor purges the virus and returns him to normal. He retrieves his daughter Rose Wilson and meets with Mirror Master and Vandal Savage. Shortly after, Mirror Master contacts them to protect Vandal Savage, and offers to bring them to Savage's hideout on a remote island in exchange. The duo agree and find they are not the only ones helping Savage as Deadshot, Bane, Lady Shiva, Cheetah, Captain Cold, Solomon Grundy, and Creeper are also there.

Jason Todd goes to the Batcave and discovers the bodies of Nightwing, Batman, and Tim Drake. He buries them and takes Batman's dog, Ace, with him. Using a tracking computer, Jason discovers only two members of the Bat family are still alive in Gotham. At the Gotham City Police Department, Cassandra Cain, Harvey Bullock, and Commissioner James Gordon are fighting off infected when Bullock is slashed. He begs Gordon to kill him, but Cassandra intervenes and breaks his neck. Jason arrives in the Batmobile and dispatches the infected. He takes Gordon and Cassandra with him. The trio arrive at a Blüdhaven orphanage with only children left.

At the island, Savage attempts to vivisect Deathstroke and Creeper to discover how they manage to overcome the infection and to create a vaccine, but is attacked and killed by Wonder Woman. The survivors escape to the orphanage, thanks to Mirror Master, who is infected when he returns to the island for Captain Cold. Rose arrives and stabs Savage. As she saves both Deathstroke and Creeper, she suddenly tells everyone to run, as Wonder Woman comes crashing in. Wonder Woman rips Savage in half and is charged at by Grundy, who she punches through the wall. Captain Cold stays behind to hold off Wonder Woman, but is infected.

Deathstroke and Jason realize that the Anti-Living have been accumulating outside the orphanage walls and prepare to face them, training the children to assist them. For three months, Batgirl and the remaining villains teach the kids various fighting skills. The villains slowly start to bond with the kids, Deadshot teaches a boy named Zaid how to shoot with a slingshot, Solomon Grundy plays with the children, and Cheetah grows attached to a girl named Matilda. Deathstroke and Jason argue over the harshness of his training before imploring Jason and Rose to take advantage of finding happiness together. One night, while patrolling the orphanage, Bane is slashed by an infected Mirror Master, while Deadshot sacrifices himself to save Zaid from being taken by him. Bane opens a hole in the walls surrounding the orphanage, allowing the Anti-Living to enter.

The survivors regroup and travel to Gotham to get help from Poison Ivy, during which Wonder Woman kills Cheetah, Creeper, Grundy, and Deathstroke. Lady Shiva sacrifices herself to save Cassandra. Mary Marvel reveals herself as one of the orphans and saves the remaining survivors before taking them into the sanctuary, where they are greeted by Ivy, Harley Quinn, Doctor Fate, John Constantine, and Zatanna. Fate explains that they are truly safe as the sanctuary has been magically shielded and the Anti-Living cannot breach it.

==== Hope at World's End ====
Hope at World's End is a loosely connected anthology series featuring stories of various heroes. Jimmy Olsen saves some of his co-workers in the initial outbreak of the virus and documents the heroes' actions throughout the DCeased event. In Kahndaq, Black Adam stops the initial spread of the virus, but is attacked and infected. In Keystone City, Wally West, Max Mercury, Impulse and Jesse Quick evacuate the uninfected residents to an alternate Earth. While they succeed, Max is infected. Before he can turn, Wally runs with him so he can join the Speed Force.

The Anti-Life army from Kahndaq travels through the shadowland towards Gotham's safe zone thanks to the powers of one of its members. In Gotham, Lex Luthor arranges for the army to be trapped in the shadow realm, while the other heroes manage to subdue Black Adam. Superman severs Adam's vocal cords to prevent him from regaining his powers.

=== Sequels ===
==== Dead Planet ====
Set five years after the original mini-series, Dead Planet follows the New Justice League as they return to an Earth, now overrun with the anti-living, in search of Cyborg, who survived Wonder Woman's attack and activated a distress signal. As the heroes return to Earth to respond to the signal, they are attacked by Wonder Woman, who infects Green Arrow. Learning from Cyborg that there is a cure for the infection, Jon rushes to stop Green Canary from killing Wonder Woman, but is too late and he is injured by a kryptonite sword.

While guarding Chicago, Roy Harper is killed by Beatriz da Costa while the group of civilians he was protecting are saved by Shadowpact. Wonder Girl takes Jon to Poison Ivy's jungle sanctuary for medical attention and reunites with the survivors there, including Mary Marvel, Doctor Fate, and Cassandra Cain. Meanwhile, Swamp Thing appears and convinces Shadowpact to travel with him to Australia after he reveals a disturbance in the Green and tells them there is a bunker of human survivors holed up there. They arrive at the bunker, but are attacked by an infected Plastic Man, who kills Ragman.

Blue Devil sacrifices himself to rescue Zatanna, and Swamp Thing protects the group long enough for Zatanna to kill Plastic Man. Inside the bunker, Shadowpact are attacked by Penguin, Maxwell Lord and Professor Ivo. Jason Blood informs Constantine that Trigon is coming to destroy the Earth since the Anti-Life is preventing people from dying. Swamp Thing is angered that the villains are torturing Floronic Man and forcing him to produce food for them, but he and Shadowpact are forced to flee when Penguin reveals his plan to use an army of Amazos to take back the Earth. Meanwhile, Constantine goes to Mister Miracle to obtain a Mother Box and extract the cure from Cyborg.

Miracle and a group of heroes travel to New Genesis to access Metron's Mobius Chair, believing that the knowledge stored within it will allow Cyborg to access the cure. Jon finds Green Canary, who had fled with the infected Green Arrow and convinces her to help them. The group make a deal with Metron, giving him access to Madame Xanadu's crystal ball in exchange for allowing Cyborg to use the Mobius Chair. Cyborg learns to recode his blood to produce the cure, and everyone returns to Earth as an undead Darkseid returns and attacks the New Gods.

Etrigan warns that Trigon will arrive in three days, so Constantine, Red Hood, Damian, Ravager, Cassandra Cain and Swamp Thing travel to Nanda Parbat to retrieve the Spear of Destiny from Deadman. They then go to the Rock of Eternity, where an infected Captain Marvel Jr. kills Red Hood. Cassandra kills Captain Marvel Jr. with Shazam's staff.

Swamp Thing links Damian, Poison Ivy, Harley Quinn, Wally West, Detective Chimp, Mary Marvel, and Cyborg to the Green to create a cure, with Barda being the first one cured. Zatanna and the Phantom Stranger confront Constantine on his actions but, following another message from Etrigan, Constantine tells everyone that the villains are about to unleash their Amazo army to destroy the Anti-Living. Using his super-speed, Wally mass-produces the cure and works with Jon to deliver it to as many people as possible.

Constantine attacks Doctor Fate and takes his helmet, combining it with the Spear of Destiny, Ragman's cloak, Xanadu's crystal ball, and the staff of Shazam to become the most powerful magical entity on Earth. He uses the cloak to absorb the souls of Penguin, Maxwell Lord, and others from the bunker so that Jon and Damian can enter and shut down the Amazo army. Constantine arrives in Paris to battle Trigon alongside Zatanna and the Stranger. Jon arrives and distracts Trigon long enough for Constantine to control his mind and force him to kill himself with the Spear of Destiny. Constantine's spirit says goodbye to Zatanna, accepting that his actions have destroyed his soul. With Trigon and the Amazo army defeated, the heroes celebrate the curing of the world. Jon reunites with his grandfather and Green Canary reunites with Green Arrow.

==== War of the Undead Gods ====
After Brainiac destroys Krypton, Supergirl is sent to live on New Genesis. Five years later, she arrives on New Genesis, only to be attacked by infected New Gods. On Earth, Jon, Cyborg, Wonder Girl, Green Canary, Mary Marvel and Shazam (Cassandra Cain) travel to the Sun and battle an infected Superman. On Earth-2, Lois Lane sends John Stewart and Guy Gardner to investigate why their neighboring planets have not been responding to their communication requests as Jon and Damien arrive through a Boom Tube with a cured Superman and Jonathan Kent. Big Barda and Mr. Miracle depart for New Genesis to reunite with their son Jacob. The next day, Brainiac probes approach Earth-2 but are dispatched by Superman, Jon and Jessica Cruz. The two Supermen enter the ship and find a decimated Brainiac, who warns them that the infected New Gods are coming.

Big Barda and Mr. Miracle return to New Genesis to find that Darkseid has destroyed it. Barda attempts to enter a corrupted Boom Tube but is stopped by Black Racer, who reveals that all Mother Boxes have been corrupted by the Anti-Life and can only be used by the Anti-Living. Darkseid and his army of infected New Gods lay siege to Sinestro's home planet Korugar. Despite Guy's reservations, Superman and Lois decide to work with Brainiac to stop the New Gods. The Yellow Lanterns attempt to fire on Korugar but are intercepted by Soranik Natu and her husband Kyle Rayner. Sinestro attempts to explain that they are trying to save the planet but an infected Supergirl attacks them, injuring Kyle and infecting Warworld with the Anti-Life virus. Darkseid then arrives, decapitates Sinestro, and acquires his ring, becoming a Yellow Lantern as Kyle and Soranik flee to the Guardians of the Universe and warn them to gather the Green Lanterns. Adam Strange, pulled from the Rann–Thanagar War, arrives on Earth two months before the cure is found and is infected by Wonder Woman. When he returns home, he kills his family and infects the Thanagarian army, gaining the attention of Lobo, who kills a platoon of soldiers. During Wonder Woman's funeral, Ares arrives and warns the heroes that the Anti-Living will destroy the universe.

Alfred, now living with Leslie Thompkins, struggles with guilt and begs to join Damian in the fight against the Anti-Living. On Almerac, Maxima orders her people to evacuate their homeworld while she stays behind to fight the undead. Manipulated by Ares, the Green Lantern Corps fight the other heroes after the Guardians announce that the best course of action is to destroy the Anti-Living rather than try to cure them. Mister Mxyzptlk appears and joins Superman and the Lanterns, but is infected, kills Stewart and Kilowog, and destroys the Green Lantern power battery. Despite the other cosmic beings deciding to sacrifice the universe and move on to another, Spectre refuses, repairs the battery, and battles Mxyzptlk. Superman and the Spectre defeat Mxyzptlk, but he kills the Spectre's human host Jim Corrigan before dying. Alfred becomes the Spectre's host and kills Highfather, but Damian is infected and urges Alfred to save everyone as Mr. Miracle gets infected by his son Jacob.

Darkseid invades Earth-2 with his army and infects Brainiac. Brainiac returns to his ship to destroy all the stolen cities but is interrupted by Cyborg who manages to hack into Brainiac and free the inhabitants of Kandor who join the fight against the Anti-Living. Jon flees the fight against Darkseid to absorb a blast aimed at destroying Earth-2. Alfred, as the Spectre, leaves and returns with the cure to heal both heroes and villains alike. Mr. Miracle and Big Barda reunite with their son Jacob while Supergirl reunites with her parents. Damian then meets with Black Racer alone, asking his opinion on a plan and he then meets Cyborg to discuss his plan. Cyborg reveals to the heroes and villains that Erebos is the source of Anti-Living and only the dead can reach him using a Doom Tube. Before the mission, Jon presents Damian with a white Batsuit.

Cyborg creates a machine that stops everyone's heart for a minute, temporarily killing them and therefore allowing them to enter the Doom Tube. On the other side, Clark, Jon, Mary, Dinah and Darkseid unleash their rays on Erebos, creating a breach that Lobo is able to further extend. Damian and Cyborg enter the breach with Warworld. Damian reveals to Cyborg that Bruce hacked into his system years ago and how Damian was in control of it. Damian found the Life Equation in Cyborg and transferred it to himself, intending to detonate within Erebos. He ejects Cyborg from Erebos. Urged by Alfred, Jon enters Erebos to say goodbye and leaves just as the Equations detonate, creating a new universe.

== Collected editions ==
The first collection of DCeased was a limited edition hardcover of 1,400 copies released for Local Comics Book Day 2019 featuring a cover with an infected Joker. The mass market hardcover collection was released on November 26, 2019 with Batman on the cover while a Barnes & Noble Exclusive Variant featured a Superman Cover and a bonus cover gallery. Each edition collects the six issue original DCeased mini-series and DCeased: A Good Day to Die one-shot.

A hardcover collection of DCeased: Unkillables was released on August 25, 2020.

A hardcover collection of DCeased: Dead Planet was released on April 27, 2021.

A hardcover collection of DCeased: Hope at World's End was released on June 15, 2021.

== Critical reception ==
The series has received critical acclaim, with critics praising the art, the plot, and the tone of the comic. According to Comic Book Roundup, the series has a score of 8.6/10.

The sequel also received critical acclaim with critics praising the art, plot, and the optimistic finale. According to Comic Book Roundup, the series has a score of 8.7 out of 10.

== See also ==
- Blackest Night, a similar crossover storyline published by DC Comics
- DC vs. Vampires, a similar DC Comics storyline about vampires
- Marvel Zombies, a similar storyline published by Marvel Comics
