= Dark Knights of Steel =

Limited comic book series by Tom Taylor and Yasmine Putri

- Cover of Dark Knights of Steel #1 (November 2021), art by Yasmine Putri.

Publication information
- Publisher: DC Comics
- Schedule: Monthly
- Format: Limited series
- Genre: Fantasy; Superhero
- Publication date: November 2021 – August 2023
- No. of issues: 13 (core); 6 (Allwinter); 2 (specials)
- Main character(s): Superman; Batman; Wonder Woman

Creative team
- Created by: Tom Taylor; Yasmine Putri
- Written by: Tom Taylor
- Artists: Yasmine Putri; Bengal (issue #4); Nathan Gooden (issue #7); Otto Schmidt (sequel)

Dark Knights of Steel is an American comic book created by Tom Taylor and Yasmine Putri and published by the publishing company DC Comics. The twelve-issue limited series—written by Taylor and illustrated primarily by Putri—began its monthly publication on November 2, 2021. Set in an alternate universe, the series is a high fantasy reimagining of the DC Universe starring Superman and Batman.

== Publication ==
The Dark Knights of Steel comic book limited series was created by Tom Taylor and Yasmine Putri, with the former serving as writer and the latter as lead illustrator; the fourth and seventh issues of the comic book were respectively drawn by Bengal and Nathan Gooden rather than Putri. Dark Knights of Steel consists of twelve issues released by DC Comics at monthly intervals, the first being published on November 2, 2021. A special issue, Tales from the Three Kingdoms, featuring three stories set in the Dark Knights of Steel world prior to the main plot, was released on September 6, 2022, written by Taylor, Jay Kristoff and C. S. Pacat.

A six-issue spin-off titled Dark Knights of Steel: Allwinter was published in September 2024, and is written by Jay Kristoff with art by Tirso Cons. The series reimagines the assassin Slade Wilson, aka Deathstroke, as a Norse Viking.#

On April 13, 2026, a sequel was announced, with Taylor returning as writer and Otto Schmidt joining as artist. The twelve issue limited series, Dark Knights of Steel II, debuted on July 15, 2026. In addition, a special one-shot focusing on Aquaman titled Heir of the Sea, was released a week later on July 22.

=== Dark Knights of Steel ===
Issue	Title	Publication date	Comicscore Index	Ref.
#1	"In the Beginning"	November 2, 2021	89	
#2	"Distant Thunder"	December 7, 2021	91	
#3	"The Gathering Storm"	January 4, 2022	84	
#4	"Child of the Gods"	February 1, 2022	79	
#5	"Lost Souls"	March 1, 2022	87	
#6	"Drums of War"	April 26, 2022	87	
#7	"United"	June 7, 2022	84	
#8	"War of the Three Kingdoms"	November 1, 2022	82	
#9	"War"	January 3, 2023	85	
#10	"The Green Man"	March 28, 2023	84	
#11	"The Winds of War"	June 6, 2023	86	
#12	"Scorched Earth"	August 22, 2023	84	

=== Dark Knights of Steel II ===
Issue	Title	Publication date	Comicscore Index	Ref.
#1	"Dark Knights of Steel II"	July 15, 2026		

=== Specials ===
Issue	Title	Publication date	Comicscore Index	Ref.
#1	Tales from the Three Kingdoms	September 6, 2022	80	
#1	Heir to the Sea	July 22, 2026		

== Plot ==
=== Main plot ===
Fleeing the destruction of Krypton, Jor-El and Lara Lor-Van crash-land on Earth and are confronted by archers from a nearby castle. Jor-El destroys them with his heat vision as his son, Kal-El, is born. In the nearby Kingdom of Storms, peasant John Constantine has a vision of demons who will conquer the world, which King Jefferson Pierce has documented.

Nineteen years later, knight Bruce Wayne, his servant and companion Alfred Pennyworth, Richard Grayson, Duke Thomas, Jason Todd, and Stephanie Brown are sent to capture a banshee. The party locates the banshee, Dinah Lance, and captures her. Dinah is taken back to the castle, where she is imprisoned in a dungeon along with other magical beings. Jor-El reveals to Bruce that he is his father. In a nearby forest, Oliver Queen, an outlaw and Thomas Wayne's former courtier, receives an enchanted arrow from the Green Man. Using the arrow, he shoots and kills Jor-El.

The Green Man visits Jefferson and Constantine, now an accomplished magician, and informs them that Jor-El is dead. General Amanda Waller insists on a declaration of war, but jester Harleen Quinzel and Alfred counsel against this. On the nearby island of Amazonia, Queen Hippolyta learns of Jor-El's death from the priestess Lois. She goes to the sparring field to inform Jor-El's estranged daughter Zala Jor-El and her lover, Hippolyta's daughter Diana. Zala flies off enraged, with Lois and Diana fearing that the war they have been trying to prevent is now inevitable. Zala then murders Jefferson's son, Prince Jacob, in front of him.

Jefferson and Constantine travel to Amazonia, where they meet with Hippolyta, Diana, Lois, and Philippus and inform them of Jacob's death. He admits that he had Jor-El killed and reveals that Zala was responsible for murdering his son, which Diana refuses to believe. Despite this, Hippolyta promises him Amazonia's support in the coming war, causing Diana to leave. As Jefferson sails home, he reveals that having Diana removed from the Amazon court was a part of his plan due to her loyalty to the El family. Zala then ambushes and murders the king, who orders Constantine to ensure that Princess Anissa Pierce succeeds him.

Alfred explains to Bruce that, when the Els originally arrived on Earth, they hid so that their alien nature would not be revealed. When a nearby volcano threatened to destroy the kingdom, they devised a way to prevent it and gave these plans to Alexander Luthor, Thomas and Martha's chancellor, who ignored their warning. The Els were forced to expose themselves to save the kingdom and became lifelong friends of the Waynes. Luthor, stripped of his titles, finds a magical ring that twists his sanity, and he attacks the royal carriages, killing the Waynes. Before she dies, Martha anoints Lara as queen and asks her to raise Bruce. Alfred then tells Bruce that they must avoid war with the Kingdom of Storms at any cost.

On the orders of Lara, Harley goes to Pamela Isley and asks that she help defend the kingdom. Though critical of the El family, Isley relents and says that she would do anything for Harley. She then apprehends Diana, who reveals that she needs to talk to Zala, who then arrives with Kal. Diana tells Zala that she has been accused of murdering Prince Jacob, which she denies, and explains that the Amazons will stand with the Kingdom of Storms in the war. Bruce and Alfred return to the castle, and Bruce confesses the truth of his parentage to Kal-El, who stabs him with kryptonite to preserve his family's claim to the throne. Bruce is later found, barely alive, by two peasants, Jonathan and Martha Kent, and is taken to their home.

Waller tells Lara that, if Hippolyta were to die, Diana would become Queen of the Amazons and that her love for Zala would prevent the Amazon army from siding with the Kingdom of Storms. Constantine summons the demon Etrigan and asks to speak to his human host Ra's al Ghul in the hope that he can resurrect Jefferson. Ra's explains that Jefferson's body is too damaged to be revived but agrees to revive Prince Jacob in exchange for information on Constantine's former wards, the Titans. Kal-El flies to Amazonia to try and clear his sister's name and prevent war, but Hippolyta stabs him with a magical sword and imprisons him. Lois comes to his cell to reveal that Amazonian ships are already en route to the kingdom.

Ra's brings the resurrected Prince Jacob to Constantine but warns that he cannot return home, for the people would surely burn him as an abomination. At the Kent farm, Bruce is healed by Rachel Roth, who purges the kryptonite from his blood. She and her fellow Titans Garfield Logan, Victor Stone, and Koriand'r of Tamaran state that they initially considered letting him die because of how the kingdom has repressed those who wield magic. Ra's, his daughter Talia al Ghul, and the League of Shades arrive to claim the Titans but are fought off by Bruce, the Kents, and the Titans.

In the dungeons of Castle El, Oliver frees the banshee, Dinah, and promises to teach her to control her powers so they can escape. Luthor, who is revealed to be the Green Man, watches the Kingdom of Storms and the Amazon army advance on the Els. Harley and General Waller meet them at the entrance of the forest and attempt to negotiate a peaceful solution, though Hippolyta and Anissa state they will only stand down if the Els surrender. Constantine attempts to attack the emissaries but is prevented by the Lady of the Forest, who covers their escape. Luthor's ring tells him to intervene, and he knocks her unconscious, telling the armies to take the castle. At Constantine's order, Prince Jacob fills Zala's lungs with water, though she is saved from death by Lara, who kills Hippolyta.

Cassandra Cain, Bruce's spy in the Amazonian court, frees Kal-El and gives him the Lasso of Truth to help stop the war. When he reaches the armies, a fleeing Lara knocks him out of the sky, and, believing he is attacking them, Diana orders the Amazons to kill him. The armies begin to fight, while Luthor attacks both sides indiscriminately. Bruce confronts Kal-El, who is confused about Bruce's accusations against him. Lara enters the castle dungeon and begins killing the prisoners, though Dinah and Oliver escape. She pursues them across the battlefield but is tackled by another Lara, causing the armies to stop fighting. Based on advice from Alfred, Oliver fires a flaming crossbow bolt into the imposter Lara's chest, revealing that she is a White Martian. Alfred apologizes to Bruce, stating he did not know "they" were on Earth and reveals his true form as J'onn J'onzz, a green-skinned alien.

Alfred reveals his true identity as J'onn J'onzz and tells them how he came to Earth. He explains that Protex, a White Martian, instigated a civil war that drove the green Martians to near extinction and destroyed their home planet. Anissa theorizes that he orchestrated the war to remove anyone who may be a threat to the White Martians, and Lara proposes that the kingdoms unite against him. Protex kills his pawn Luthor and absorbs the ring's power. Bruce finally reveals to Kal-El that they are brothers, and they reconcile. Protex attempts to kill Alfred but is defeated, though Alfred warns he will return.

The Amazons hold their ground while Bruce, Kal-El, Diana, and Zala lure the Martians to Mount Kristoff, where they are caught in the volcano's eruption. Lara banishes the surviving Martians to the Phantom Zone. Meanwhile, Alfred tries to imprison Waller, but she kills him with fire. Later, the three kingdoms unite under a formal treaty, forming "The League." Lara urges Bruce to rule as the heir of the Wayne and El bloodlines, but he declines, choosing instead to travel and discover his true identity.

=== Tales from the Three Kingdoms ===
==== Arkham Orphanage ====
Escaping from Arkham Orphanage by being adopted by Perry White and his wife, young James Olsen develops an interest in astronomy and befriends Kal-El. When James and several orphans go missing, Kal decides to look for them himself and reluctantly allows Bruce and Zala to accompany him. The three royals speak with two of the remaining orphans, Oswald Cobblepot and Harvey Dent, who tell them that a winged creature took their friend Waylon Jones and carried him into the mountains. They locate the creature and engage it in battle but are stopped by James, who reveals that it is his friend Kirk Langstrom, who had taken the orphans to protect them from the experiments that were being performed on them by the orphanage's owner Elizabeth Arkham. Lara and Jor-El send General Waller to shut down the orphanage and take Elizabeth into custody, though Waller secretly recruits Elizabeth to work for her.

==== The Flock ====
In order to learn more about his people, Harley plans to take Prince Kal-El into the town during All Hallows Eve, but they are caught by Bruce, who warns of lawlessness in the city and goes with them, much to Harley's chagrin. A gang of street urchins known as the Robins steal Harley's necklace and scatter as the princes give chase. Bruce follows Richard, the ringleader, and is impressed with his acrobatic abilities and is able to capture him when he stops to save a small boy from being hit by a carriage, while Kal rounds up the others. Bruce warns that pickpockets eventually become bandits and killers but the Robins deny this, stating that they only steal from those who can afford it and only in order to survive and protect others. Instead of imprisoning them, Bruce recruits them as his protegees.

==== King's Bane ====
A young Bruce and his guards are attacked in the forest by a masked outlaw known as The King's Bane who then kneels before Bruce and hails him as the true King, claiming that the Els are monsters who have no right to the throne. Bane offers to teach Bruce how to kill a monster and invites him to a meeting of Wayne loyalists at a nearby inn. Bane begins training Bruce and teaches him how to use stealth and surprise in order to fight those he cannot match in strength and confesses that he was a former guard of the Waynes and was there when the Green Man killed them. He was crippled in the attack and was saved by Jonathan Crane, who used dark magic to keep him alive. Though he was unable to save the King and Queen, Bane vows to honor their memory by ensuring their heir takes the throne. Bruce smuggles Bane into the castle but double-crosses Bane, who planned to murder the Els with a magical mace, and throws him into the dungeon before pledging his loyalty to Lara and Jor-El.

=== Heir to the Sea ===
The Wayne army, led by General Grant, is set to the port city of Lemuria following rumors of blood-soaked waves. There, soldiers Jonathan and Martha Kent, James Gordon, and Amanda Waller see two factions of ocean-men fighting and Grant is reluctant to intervene until it is clear which group may become their allies. On Emperor Manta's orders, his forces use water magic to drown the city in search of Atlanna, an escaped prisoner. Separated from the rest of the army, Jonathan and Martha discover a baby and rescue him. Atlanna then appears and begs them to raise the child, her son Arthur, as their own before dying from her injuries. The Kent's agree to desert the army and go into hiding in Gotham with Arthur, though their actions are witnessed by Waller. As he grows up, Arthur's powers over sea life are noticed and word travels to Manta, who sends the pirate King Shark to kill him, believing Arthur a threat to his rule of Atlantis, but the Kents, alongside Arthur, Gordon, and Waller, fight them off. Gordon gifts the Kents his family farm so they can train Arthur, whom they tell about his true heritage. When he is of age, Arthur leaves the Kents behind and dives into the sea to fight Manta for the crown.

== Collected editions ==
Title	Collected material	Pages	Publication date	ISBN	Ref.
Dark Knights of Steel: The Gathering Storm	Dark Knights of Steel #1–3	72	March 1, 2022		
Dark Knights of Steel Vol. 1	Dark Knights of Steel #1-6	176	September 20, 2022	978-1779516756	
Dark Knights of Steel Vol. 2	Dark Knights of Steel #7-12; Dark Knights of Steel: Tales from the Three Kingdoms #1	208	December 12, 2023	978-1779520791	

== Reception ==
Reviewing the first issue of Dark Knights of Steel, Henry Varona of Comic Book Resources stated: "Dark Knights of Steel #1 is an appropriately epic beginning to DC's latest Elseworlds' epic. Tom Taylor proves yet again that he is a master of subverting expectations when crafting alternate DC Universes, while the gorgeous artwork of Yasmine Putri turns the concept into a fully realized fantasy".

According to Comicscored.com, the 12-issue limited series received positive ratings, with a Comicscore Index of 85 based on 189 ratings from critics.

== See also ==
- Marvel 1602, a comic book series by Marvel Comics with a similar premise.
