= DC Universe Online: Legends =

DC Comics comic book series

- Variant incentive cover to DC Universe Online: Legends #1 by Ryan Sook.

Publication information
- Publisher: DC Comics
- Schedule: Bi-weekly
- Format: Limited series
- Genre: Superhero
- Publication date: February 2011 – May 2012
- No. of issues: 27 (26 + issue #0)
- Main character: DC Universe

Creative team
- Written by: Marv Wolfman; Tony Bedard; Tom Taylor
- Artist(s): Howard Porter; Adriana Melo; Norman Lee; Mike Miller; Bruno Redondo

DC Universe Online: Legends is a comic book limited series published by DC Comics. It debuted on February 2, 2011, and is an expansion of the story of the DC Universe Online MMORPG video game. The series was written by the game's story co-writer Marv Wolfman and Tony Bedard with Tom Taylor penning issues #16 and 17. Originally announced as a 52-issue yearlong weekly series, it was instead solicited as a bi-weekly series slated to have 26 issues. Although solicitations for DC Universe Online: Legends, along with many other comics, were dropped from the DC Comics website and Diamond/Alliance pre-order catalogs beginning September 2011 as part of DC's new continuity reboot, the remaining issues returned to the publisher's lineup with the October 2011 solicitations. By August 2012, three paperback books were published, collecting the entire series.

== Plot ==
=== Premise ===
Released just under a month after the launch of DC Universe Online, Legends ties directly into the gameplay and stories that develop in the online world. DC Universe Online is set in the present day, but the opening cinematic sequence takes place in a gritty, war-torn future depicting a final battle between the world's greatest heroes and villains.

This battle takes place in the ruins of Metropolis, and features the deaths of several well-known DC Comics characters. The battle culminates with the death of Superman at the hands of Lex Luthor, leaving him and the Joker as the survivors. Luthor stands back to proclaim his victory, only to see Brainiac's war fleet fill the skies. So far, the comic has served to expand upon the events of Brainiac's return to Earth, and has yet to visit the present-day DC Universe.

=== Synopsis ===
The comic begins right after Lex Luthor stabs Superman with a kryptonite spear, killing him. Captain Cold, one of the supervillains at the battle, angrily tells Luthor to get away from Superman, calling him "a traitor to our world" and tries to freeze Superman to revive him later, but Luthor kills him, saying that Superman will not live again.

Just as Luthor thinks that the world will finally be his, Brainiac's fleet descends upon the planet and releases hordes of Exobyte nanites upon every major country in the world to record, collect, and destroy Earth's remaining metahumans. Brainiac contacts Luthor and tells him to activate the Enforcer robots that Luthor created for him to eradicate the rest of the population. Despite promising that Luthor would be made the leader of Earth for his cooperation, Brainiac reveals that he will digitize Luthor's mind, store it into his database, and have the Earth "deleted". Brainiac shuts down the weapon systems of Luthor's armor, and activates the Enforcers himself.

Luthor manages to free himself from Brainiac's control using Black Adam's lightning, and leaves the now-mortal Adam to die at the hands of the Enforcers. He escapes to a LexCorp facility and uses a rocket there to retreat to a bunker in New Mexico. He flashes back to several years ago, when he first met Brainiac. During a board meeting, he was informed there was a security breach at "Laboratory K" in Antarctica: a nanite of extraterrestrial origin infiltrated the lab and downloaded most of the mainframe's data on metahumans before it was isolated and captured. Luthor arrived at the facility, and was contacted by Brainiac (who referred to himself as "Vril Dox of the planet Colu"). Brainiac appealed to Luthor's ego and hatred of Superman, and convinced Luthor to cooperate with him. Within months, Luthor constructed factories for Brainiac on five continents, constantly producing Enforcers for him.

At the New Mexico bunker, Luthor calls heroes and villains alike to join him at the bunker on every communication channel and electronic device. He successfully recruits Ray Palmer, Power Girl, Black Canary, Blue Beetle, Doctor Fate, August General in Iron, Mr. Freeze, Cheetah, and Solomon Grundy.

Luthor explains to the group that Brainiac is currently stripping the world of its landmarks and absorbing metahuman powers using Exobytes. As he is about to explain his plan of attack, the Blue Beetle questions why Superman is not the leader of the resistance (none of the gathered heroes and villains were present when Superman was killed), while Mr. Freeze states that Luthor's knowledge of Brainiac's plan is suspicious. Just as the rest of the group starts to doubt Luthor, they are interrupted by the August General, who says that their differences mean nothing now and that he would follow the smartest man in the room, whether good or bad. Ray Palmer reluctantly agrees to listen to Luthor's command.

The group splits into three teams to obtain items needed for fighting Brainiac: August General in Iron, Blue Beetle, and Black Canary go to Metropolis to obtain a quantum scan of Brainiac's mothership. Mr. Freeze and Doctor Fate head to Keystone City to obtain an active sample of Exobytes, while Ray Palmer, Grundy, and the Cheetah retrieve an item stashed at Luthor's Rocky Mountain production facility.

In the present day, Brainiac contacts Luthor while he was inspecting the Rocky Mountain factory. After making sure the Enforcers are in production, Brainiac requests a "control sample" to calibrate his equipment with, and chooses the Daily Planet building. Luthor angrily tells him to leave his city alone, but Brainiac simply states that it is too late. The building is enveloped in a massive forcefield, and one of Brainiac's ships lifts it into space. Superman and the rest of the Justice League fail to penetrate the forcefield, and Superman has to watch helplessly as the building disappears before his eyes with Lois Lane inside it. Brainiac states that he will begin experimenting on the humans to calibrate the Exobytes to human physiology, Luthor demands Brainiac to leave Lois alone, saying that their partnership is over if she is harmed, and that Brainiac needs him. Back in the future, the three teams obtain the items Luthor needed, but Luthor's monologue reveals that he did not plan on defeating Brainiac; He only wanted revenge, even if it costs the lives of all remaining heroes and villains.
