= Glenn Lumsden =

Australian comic book artist and writer (born 1964)

- Born: 1964 (age 61–62); Sydney, New South Wales, Australia
- Occupations: Cartoonist, writer, artist, publisher, designer
- Writing career
- Genres: Adventure, Super Heroes, Pulp Fiction
- Website: glennlumsdenillustrator.com

Glenn Lumsden is an Australian comic book artist and writer.

Born in Sydney in 1964, he began self publishing in 1985 with David de Vries, Gary Chaloner and Tad Pietrzykowski under the Cyclone Comics imprint, working on The Southern Squadron and Dark Nebula.

Lumsden and de Vries entered the American market through First Comics, Nicotat and Malibu Graphics with The Southern Squadron. Together they have drawn a new look version of The Phantom for Marvel Comics, have worked on Batman: Legends of the Dark Knight and Star Trek comics for DC Comics The Puppet Master for Eternity Comics and Planet of the Apes and Flesh Gordon for Malibu Comics.

Lumsden moved to South Australia where he founded the Barossa Studios with David Heinrich, Rod Tokely and David G. Williams, doing artwork for magazines like Picture, People, Ralph, The Australian Financial Review and The Bulletin.
