= Mirranda Burton =

New Zealand printmaker and graphic novelist

- Born: Mirranda Burton; 1973 (age 52–53)
- Education: Advanced Diploma of Visual Arts (North Adelaide School of Art), Bachelor of Multimedia Design (Swinburne University of Technology)
- Awards: Aurealis Award for graphic novel 2011 Hidden; Golden Ledger award for excellence in Australian comics 2012 Hidden
- Website: mirrandaburton.com

Mirranda Burton (born 1973) is a New Zealand-born artist and writer living on Wurundjeri land/Melbourne, Australia.

Burton works within the disciplines of printmaking, commercial and independent animation, illustration, graphic recording and graphic storytelling. The main focus of her art practice is linocut printmaking and writing and drawing graphic novels. Her first comic strip stories appeared from 2008 in publications such as Tango and Going Down Swinging. In 2011 her first graphic novel Hidden was published by Black Pepper Publishing, for which she received an Aurealis Award and a Gold Ledger for excellence in Australian comics. Hidden was also published under the title Cachés by La Boîte à Bulles. In 2021 her second graphic novel Underground: Marsupial Outlaws and Other Rebels of Australia’s War in Vietnam was published by Allen & Unwin.

Burton was Illustrator-in-Residence at The Atrium, Federation Square during the Melbourne Writers Festival in 2012 and artist in residence at the Dunmoochin Foundation, 2011 to 2013.

== Awards ==
- Aurealis Award for graphic novel (2011)
- Golden Ledger award for excellence in Australian comics (2012)

== Publications ==
- Hidden (2011)
- Three Words: An anthology of Aotearoa / NZ Women's Comics (2016) (contributor)
- Underground: Marsupial Outlaws and Other Rebels of Australia's War in Vietnam (2021), Allen & Unwin
