= David de Vries =

New Zealand film writer, director, and producer

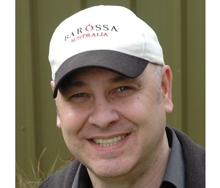
- de Vries in 2015
- Born: 1961 (age 64–65); Wellington, New Zealand
- Occupations: Filmmaker, screenwriter, director, producer, editor, cartoonist, writer, artist, publisher, designer
- Writing career
- Genres: Adventure, Super Heros, Pulp Fiction, Thriller, Horror, Sci Fi, Fantasy, Comedy

David (Dave) de Vries (born 1961) is a New Zealand film writer, director, and producer who also writes and illustrates comic books. He was born in New Zealand and emigrated with his family to Australia.

De Vries was born in Wellington, New Zealand, in 1961, and grew up in the inner suburb of Ngaio. He emigrated to Melbourne at an early age with his parents, where he lived until he was eighteen. After studying painting at RMIT he started his comic book career in the early 1980s with work for OzComics, Phantastique, MAD Magazine and Penthouse. Together with Gary Chaloner, Glenn Lumsden and Tad Pietrzykowski he established Cyclone Comics in 1985, to ensure that their characters could be published while remaining under their control.

De Vries and Lumsden entered the American market through First Comics, Nicotat and Malibu Graphics with The Southern Squadron, a superhero team that had taken over the Cyclone title. Together they have drawn a new look version of The Phantom for Marvel Comics, have worked on Batman: Legends of the Dark Knight Star Trek comics for DC Comics, The Eternal Warrior Yearbook for Valiant Comics, The Puppet Master for Eternity Comics and Planet of the Apes and Flesh Gordon for Malibu Comics. de Vries also worked on a number of projects as a writer, including The Thing From Another World for First Comics, Black Lightning and a Green Lantern annual for DC, as well as recreating the origin of Captain Boomerang with John Ostrander in an issue of the Suicide Squad.

De Vries lives in South Australia where he founded the Barossa Studios with Lumsden, David Heinrich, Rod Tokely and David G. Williams, doing artwork for magazines like Picture, People, Ralph, The Australian Financial Review and The Bulletin.

In 2009 de Vries wrote and directed a feature film, Carmilla Hyde, which won 'Best Feature' at the South Australian Screen Awards in March 2010 after winning 'Best Guerilla Feature' and 'Best Supporting Actress' at the Melbourne Underground Film Festival. Carmilla Hyde has won nine awards, which also include 'Best International Feature' Swansea Bay Film Festival, 'Best International Feature' International Film Festival South Africa, 'Best Australian Feature' Sexy International Film Festival and 'Best Foreign Film' Minneapolis Underground Film Festival.

De Vries has written a number of live action and animation scripts for such film and TV. He is course coordinator of the Advance Production Projects for the Third Year Film & Television students at UniSA, and the Festival Director for the Barossa Film Festival.

== Bibliography (as writer) ==
=== Australian Comic Books ===
OzComics

Oz Comics #1 1 - 2

McKerr-Whitfield

Cyclone 1

Cyclone! Australia 1 - 4

Cyclone Comics Australia

Cyclone! Australia 5 - 8

Southern Squadron 9 - 13

Southern Squadron Special: The Waldon File 1

Cyclone! Super Special 1 - 2

G.I. Joe Australia 1, 4

Dark Nebula 7, 8

Cyclone Redux: The Adventures of Flash Damingo & The Jackaroo 3 - 4

Southern Aurora Comics

Southern Aurora Comics Presents 1 - 2

Issue One Comics

Da 'n' Dill 1

Puffin Books

Round The Twist 1 - 2

Paul Jennings 1997 Super Diary

Steve Carter's Comic Nasties

A Mission from God - Complete Uncut Version

=== American Comic Books ===
Aricel

Full Throttle 1 - 2

Comico

Fathom 1 - 3

Srikeforce: America 1

Dark Horse Comics

The Thing from Another World: Eternal Vows 1 - 4

Dark Horse Down Under 3

DC Comics

Suicide Squad 44

Star Trek 34

Green Lantern Annual 3

Green Lantern Corps Quarterly 8

Black Lightning 9 -13

First Comics

Grimjack 67

Mailbu/Eternity Comics

Puppet Master 1 - 4

Puppet Master: Children of the Puppet Master 1 - 2

The Southern Squadron 1 - 4

Southern Squadron: The Freedom of Information Act 1 - 4

Bodyguard 1 - 3

Marvel Comics

Marvel Comics Presents 148, 162 - 1965

The Phantom: Ghost Who Walks 1 - 3

Nicotat

Boris The Bear 25

Valiant/Acclaim

Eternal Warrior Yearbook 1

Magnus, Robot Fighter 34, 47 - 48

Rai and the Future Force 19
