= Tim Molloy =

New Zealand illustrator and comic artist

Tim Molloy is a New Zealand illustrator and comic artist, living and working in Melbourne. Molloy's work has appeared in Tango, Torpedo, and Desktop Magazine. In 2007, he published a collection of his comic art as Under the Bed. Since 2006, he has collaborated with writer Adam Lachlan to produce Life on Earth cartoons. Recently he has published two graphic novels, It Shines and Shakes and Laughs and Mr Unpronounceable Adventures, through Australian publisher Milk Shadow Books.

As a promotion for the web series Zombies On Ramsay Street, Molloy was employed to zombify a number of press social media profiles. He gave the same treatment to MyM magazine's official mascot Mya Tenshi, in Issue 31.
