= The Deep: Here Be Dragons =

- Date: August 2011
- Page count: 88 pages
- Publisher: Gestalt Publishing

Creative team
- Writers: Tom Taylor
- Artists: James Brouwer
- ISBN: 0980782341

The Deep: Here Be Dragons is an original graphic novel from Gestalt Publishing, written by award-winning writer Tom Taylor and illustrated by James Brouwer. The novel follows the Nekton family, a multiethnic family of Aquanauts who live on a submarine. The all-ages graphic novel won the Aurealis Award, Australia's premier speculative fiction literary award, for Best illustrated book/graphic novel in 2012 and was also nominated for Best children's illustrated work/picture book.

== Plot ==
The novel follows the Nekton family who have been exploring the seas for generations. In their state-of-the-art submarine, Arronax, they follow strange reports of monster sightings all the way to Greenland. What they discover in those dark depths may change their perceptions of the ocean forever.

== Diversity ==
The Nekton family are notable for their multicultural makeup; the family is composed of a black father, an Asian mother, and their two children. When asked about the make-up of the protagonists in an interview for MTV Geek, writer Tom Taylor stated that he wanted a diverse cast of heroes where their ethnicity or country of origin did not play a role in the comics.

== Television series and video game ==
An animated series based on the comic premiered on 7two and WildBrainTV in 2015. The show was produced by Nerd Corps Entertainment, WildBrain and A Stark Production. A virtual reality video game based on the animated series, The Deep: Beyond the Reef, was released in 2025 for Meta Quest 3 and was produced by Toronto-based Dark Slope Studios.
