= Gestalt Publishing =

Australian publishing house

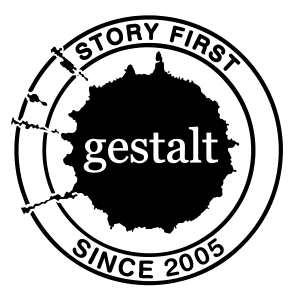
- Founded: 2005
- Founder: Wolfgang Bylsma; Skye Ogden
- Country of origin: Australia
- Headquarters location: Perth, Western Australia
- Publication types: Comics
- Official website: Official website

Gestalt Publishing is an Australian independent graphic novel publishing house. They primarily publish Australian graphic novelists, and have an ethos of supporting and developing emerging talent.

== History ==
The company was officially founded in Applecross, Western Australia, in 2005 by Wolfgang Bylsma and Skye Ogden, although they had previously been involved in creating, editing and publishing underground and editorial comics since the early-1990s.

Gestalt operates out of Perth, Western Australia. However, the company routinely travels to other parts of Australia for conventions and festivals.

To date, Gestalt Publishing have published such notable books as The Deep: Here Be Dragons, Eldritch Kid, Unmasked, and Flinch.

Gestalt have published the work of many well-known creators, including Shaun Tan, Tom Taylor, Andrew Constant, Colin Wilson, and Terry Dowling.

In 2013, a documentary called Comic Book Heroes was made about the company’s founders and core talent, and their efforts to establish a following in the US market.

In 2018 and 2019, Gestalt's editor-in-chief, Wolfgang Bylsma, worked with the Indigenous Literacy Foundation to mentor and support a group of young Indigenous comic writers and artists based in Mparntwe (Alice Springs) called "Stick Mob Studios". Gestalt published three of Stick Mob Studios' comics – Storm Warning, Exo Dimensions, and Mixed Feelings.

Gestalt also collaborated with Big hART to produce and print physical editions of the comic series Neomad. The comic was originally produced as part of their Yijala Yala project, which worked with the Roebourne community to create videos, games, performances, and interactive comics. The graphic novel went on to receive the Gold Ledger Award in 2016.

In 2022, one of the owners of Gestalt, Wolfgang Bylsma, established Comics On Country as a not-for-profit platform to help support First Nations creators in telling their stories through comics.

== Indigiverse ==
In 2022, Gestalt announced that it would be partnering with Comics On Country and Ice Cream Productions to create an Aboriginal superhero universe under the "Indigiverse" banner. This will consist of multiple comic book series, all of which will feature Aboriginal Australian characters and Lore.

The first comic series under the Indigiverse imprint is Dark Heart, written by Gooniyandi-Miriuwung Gajerrong man Scott Wilson, with art by Katie Houghton-Ward. The first issue was released in July 2022. The comic features an "Elder Protector" who guards the world against beings of darkness. The second issue was scheduled for release in November 2022, with production underway on another two comic series to see publication in 2023.

== Books ==
- His Dream of the Skyland
- Changing Ways: Book 1
- Changing Ways: Book 2
- Changing Ways: Book 3, Chapter 1
- The Deep Vol. 1: Here Be Dragons
- The Deep Vol. 2: The Vanishing Island
- Torn
- Lark Case Files: Black City
- Lark Case Files: Devil City
- Neomad
- Exo Dimensions Vol. 1
- Mixed Feelings Vol. 1
- Storm Warning Vol. 1
- Vowels
- Eldritch Kid: Bone War
- Eldritch Kid: Whisky and Hate
- Karnak
- Plato's Allegory of the Cave
- Rombies
- The Example
- The More Things Change
- Proud Heart
- Believe
- MIDAS
- Fly
- Sebastian Hawks
- Waldo's Hawaiian Holiday
- Unmasked Vol.1: Going Straight Is No Way To Die
- Unmasked: Caddy Full of Blood
- Wastelander Panda Vol. 1: Exile
- Walled City Book 1: His Dream of the Skyland
- Walled City Book 2: Nocturne
- Flinch
- Lustration Vol. 1
- Character Sketches
- Khulan
- Talgard: Tome One
- Talgard: Tome Two
- Flock Book One: Warbird
- Cleverman Vol. 1
- Cleverman Vol. 2
- Dark Heart Vol. 1
