= Chester Heights Camp Meeting Historic District =

Historic district in Pennsylvania, United States

- U.S. National Register of Historic Places
- U.S. Historic district
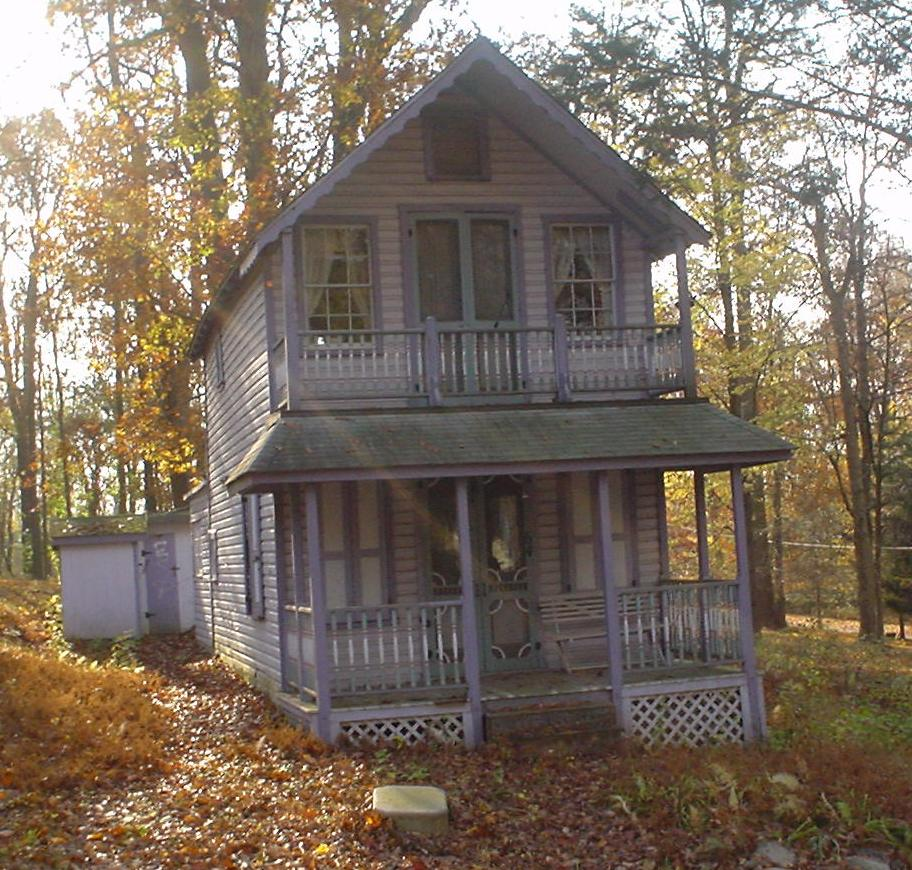
- Chester Heights Camp Meeting, November 2009

- Location within Pennsylvania Location within the United States
- Location: 320 Valley Brook Rd., Chester Heights, Pennsylvania
- Coordinates: 39°53′24″N 75°28′03″W
- Area: 30.9 acres (12.5 ha)
- Built: 1872
- Architectural style: Gothic Revival, Queen Anne
- NRHP reference No.: 01000460
- Added to NRHP: May 8, 2001

The Chester Heights Camp Meeting Historic District is a historic Methodist camp meeting and national historic district located in Chester Heights, Delaware County, Pennsylvania, United States. The district includes 101 contributing buildings, which were designed in the vernacular camp meeting style of architecture; additional notable examples of the Gothic Revival and Queen Anne styles also are present here. Public buildings include the contributing Tabernacle (1878), Dining Hall (1900), Youth Tabernacle (1909, and dormitory. Most of the contributing buildings are cottages, which were built roughly between 1876 and 1920.

In two separate incidents in 2011 and early 2012, the Tabernacle and multiple cottages were burned in arson incidents. In 2016 part of the property was sold to be developed as an apartment complex.

== History ==
In 1872, an association of Methodists purchased land and incorporated under the title Chester-Heights Camp-Meeting Association.

=== Placement of this district on the National Register of Historic Places ===
The NRHP nomination application for the Chester Heights Camp Meeting Historic District was formally reviewed by Pennsylvania's Historic Preservation Board at its March 13, 2001 meeting at 9:45 a.m. at the State Museum in Harrisburg. Also considered for NRHP status at this time were the: Protection of the Flag Monument in Athens, Pennsylvania; Normandy Farm, George K. Heller School, and Upper Roxborough Historic District in Montgomery County; Awbury Historic District and Harris/Laird, Schober & Company Building in Philadelphia; Michael Derstine Farmstead in Bucks County; John Nicholas and Elizabeth Moyer House in Berks County; William Shelly School and Annex in York County; and the Zeta Psi Fraternity House in Northampton County.

The Chester Heights Camp Meeting Historic District was then officially added to the National Register of Historic Places later in 2001.

=== Later history ===
In 2011 and early 2012, the Tabernacle and multiple cottages were burned in two separate arson incidents. In 2016 part of the property was sold to be developed as an apartment complex.
