= Protection of the Flag Monument =

- U.S. National Register of Historic Places
- U.S. Historic district – Contributing property
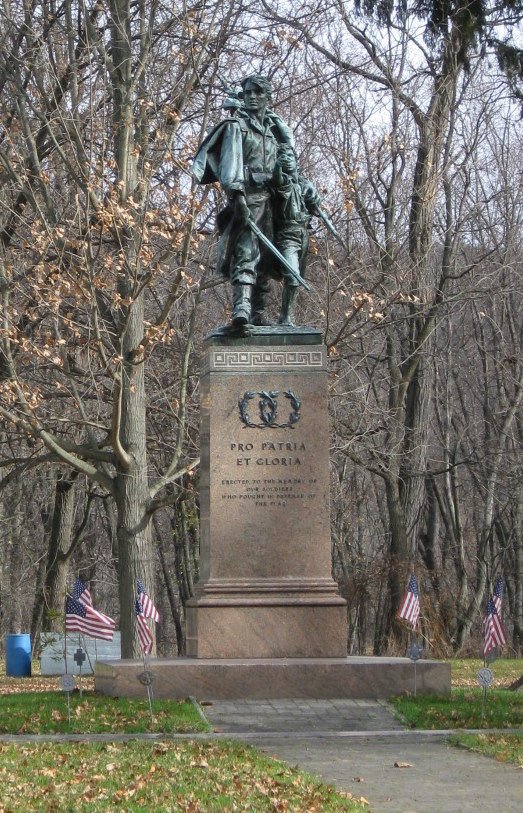
- Protection of the Flag Monument, November 2009

- Location within Pennsylvania Location within the United States
- Location: 715 S. Main St., Athens, Pennsylvania
- Coordinates: 41°57′3″N 76°30′59″W
- Area: 1 acre (0.40 ha)
- Built: 1900-1902
- Architect: McKim, Mead & White; Brewster, George Thomas, et al.
- Architectural style: Classical Revival
- NRHP reference No.: 01000604
- Added to NRHP: June 8, 2001

The Protection of the Flag Monument (also known as the "Defense of the Flag Monument") is a historic war memorial located in Academy Park at 715 South Main Street in Athens, Bradford County, Pennsylvania. Designed in the Classical Revival style by the architectural firm McKim, Mead & White, with a sculpture by George Thomas Brewster, it was erected between 1900 and 1902, and has a granite pedestal topped by a bronze sculpture group. The sculpture depicts an adult soldier and a young drummer boy attired in Revolutionary War clothing and protecting their flag from falling into enemy hands. A commemorative plaque indicates it was dedicated in memory of the soldiers who fought in defense of the flag.

== History and architectural features ==
Located in Academy Park at 715 South Main Street in Athens, Pennsylvania, the Protection of the Flag Monument was completed in 1902. Erected on the front of the lot where it stands, it occupies the center of the site's western half. The front of the monument may be reached from Main Street via a concrete sidewalk while the monument's eastern side may be approached via a brick walkway, which is flanked by two stones affixed with bronze commemorative plaques. Situated between those stones is a state historical marker and a flag pole.

The monument itself, which is situated 50 feet (15 m) east of the sidewalk, is surrounded by a 26-foot (7.9 m) ornamented, raised granite coping square. The monument's polished, Stony Creek granite pedestal, which stands at the center of that square, is composed of a plinth, molded base, die, and a cap, is roughly nine feet tall, and is topped by a roughly eight-foot-tall bronze sculpture of a wounded adult Revolutionary War-era soldier holding a rifle and a young, barefooted drummer boy. It was created by sculptor George T. Brewster.

The monument's sculpture was commissioned in 1900 by Joseph Whipple Stickler and his wife, Charlotte Snell Stickler, and was unveiled in June 1902. Stickler, a native of New York who became a successful realtor and philanthropist, had wed Charlotte Snell in Hoboken, New Jersey; Snell, who had attended school at the Athens Academy which had previously been located where the monument now stands, was a daughter of Captain John Snell, an Athens resident who "was one of the first white children born in Bradford county about the time of the Wyoming Massacre," according to historian Henry Hall.

=== Inscriptions ===
The front of the monument, which faces west in the park, is adorned with a bronze bas relief of entwined laurel wreaths, below which were placed the words of the statue's dedication:

"PRO PATRIA ET GLORIA
ERECTED TO THE MEMORY OF OUR SOLDIERS WHO FOUGHT IN DEFENSE OF THE FLAG."

The inscription on the opposite (rear), eastern-facing side of the monument reads:

"PRESENTED TO THE TOWNSHIP OF ATHENS, BRADFORD COUNTY BY JOSEPH WHIPPLE AND CHARLOTTE SNELL STICKLER OF ORANGE, NEW JERSEY MDCCCC."

=== National Register listing ===
The NRHP nomination application for the Protection of the Flag Monument was formally reviewed by Pennsylvania's Historic Preservation Board at its March 13, 2001 meeting at 9:45 a.m. at the State Museum in Harrisburg. Also considered for NRHP status at this time were the: Normandy Farm, George K. Heller School, and Upper Roxborough Historic District in Montgomery County; Awbury Historic District and Harris/Laird, Schober & Company Building in Philadelphia; Michael Derstine Farmstead in Bucks County; Chester Heights Camp Meeting Historic District in Delaware County; John Nicholas and Elizabeth Moyer House in Berks County; William Shelly School and Annex in York County; and the Zeta Psi Fraternity House in Northampton County.

This monument was then officially added to the National Register of Historic Places later in 2001. It is located in the Athens Historic District.

== See also ==
- List of McKim, Mead & White buildings
- National Register of Historic Places listings in Bradford County, Pennsylvania
