= Stonehaven (disambiguation) =

Stonehaven is a town in Aberdeenshire, Scotland.

Stonehaven may also refer to

Places

- Stonehaven, Victoria, Australia
- Stonehaven, New Brunswick, Canada
- Stonehaven is a community in Newmarket, Ontario
- Stonehaven (Charlotte neighborhood), North Carolina, United States
- Stonehaven, Wisconsin, United States

People

- Viscount Stonehaven, a title in the peerage of the United Kingdom

Other

- Stonehaven (comics), graphic novels set in the fictional city of Stonehaven
- Stonehaven derailment, a railway accident in Scotland
- Stonehaven Group, a geologic formation
- Stonehaven (Media, Pennsylvania), a historic house in the United States
