= Awbury Historic District =

Historic district in Pennsylvania, United States

- U.S. National Register of Historic Places
- U.S. Historic district
- Philadelphia Register of Historic Places
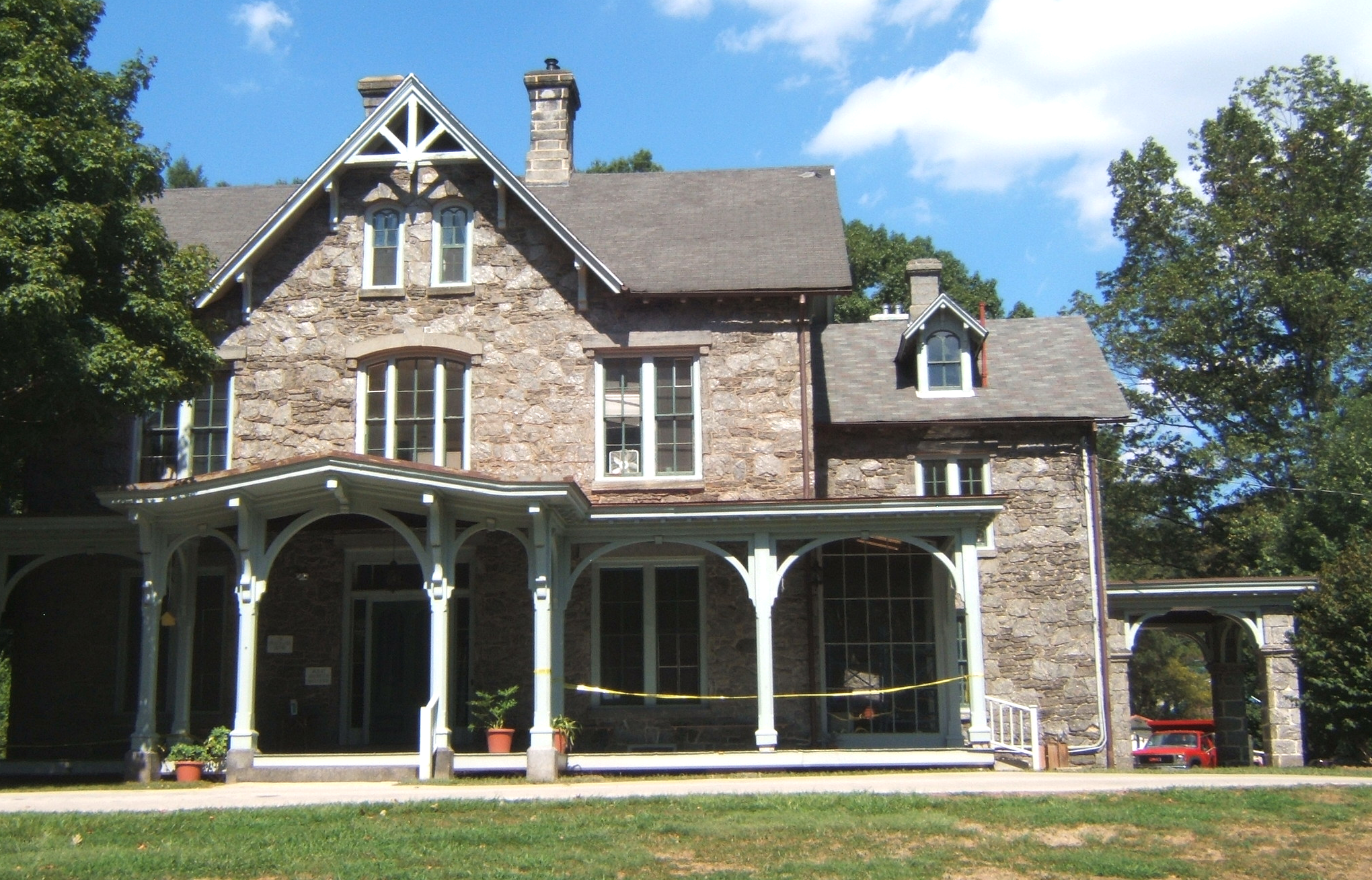
- Francis Cope House

- Location within Philadelphia Location within Pennsylvania Location within the United States
- Location: Roughly bounded by Chew Ave., Avonhoe Rd., Devon PL., Haines and Ardleigh Sts. and Arboretum boundary, Philadelphia, Pennsylvania
- Coordinates: 40°3′6″N 75°10′14″W
- Area: 78 acres (32 ha)
- Built: 1849
- Architect: multiple
- Architectural style: Gothic Revival, Italian Villa, et al.
- NRHP reference No.: 01000462

Significant dates
- Added to NRHP: May 2, 2001
- Designated PRHP: May 14, 2010

The Awbury Historic District is a historic area in the East Germantown neighborhood of Philadelphia, Pennsylvania. It encompasses the former summer homes and farms of the extended Cope family, who moved to the area starting in 1849 and the entire Awbury Arboretum, which occupies most of the district's area, as well as adjacent properties developed and occupied by Henry Cope (1793–1865), son and successor to prominent Philadelphia Orthodox Quaker merchant Thomas Pym Cope (1768–1854), his close relatives, and his descendants. The district, which has been described by Philadelphia area historians as "visually distinct from the densely-built urban blocks that surround it on three sides, and from the level, open landscape of the city park to the northwest," features buildings which were designed in the Gothic Revival, Italian Villa, Queen Anne, Tudor Revival, Shingle, and Colonial Revival styles of architecture between 1849 and 1922.

This district was added to the National Register of Historic Places in 2001. In 2010 it was added to the Philadelphia Register of Historic Places.

== History and architectural features ==
The Awbury Historic District in Philadelphia's East Germantown neighborhood encompasses the former summer homes and farms of the extended Cope family, who moved to the area starting in 1849, as well as the entire Awbury Arboretum, which occupies most of the district's area. In addition, it also includes properties which were developed and occupied by Henry Cope (1793–1865), son of the prominent Philadelphia Orthodox Quaker merchant Thomas Pym Cope (1768–1854). An irregularly shaped district, its boundaries are described as follows by the City of Philadelphia's list of historic districts:

"Beginning at the northwest corner of Ardleigh Street and E. Washington Lane, the boundary moves southeast along Ardleigh Street to the rear property lines of the homes on the northwestern corner of Ardleigh and E. Haines Streets; then travels southwest along the rear of properties of E. Haines Street; then travels along the eastern, southern, and western property lines of 999 E. Haines street; then travels southwest to Devon Place; then travels along Devon Place and the front property lines of 5913-23 and 5925-31 Devon Places; then travels north to the rear property lines of the houses on Devon Place; then travels southwest, then south, and then southeast along the rear of the property lines along Devon Place to E. Haines Street; then travels southwest along E. Haines Street to the northern corner of Avonhoe Road; then travels north and west along Avonhoe Road to the northeast corner of the property at 6060 Avonhoe road; then travels along the eastern and southern property lines of 6060 Avonhoe Road and comes to Chew Avenue; then travels southwest on High Street until it reaches the SEPTA R7 railroad line; then travels along the eastern edge of the railroad line, crosses Washington Lane, and reaches the northwestern corner of the Awbry Arboretum property line; then travels northeast along the rear of the properties of the 900 and 1000 E. Washington Lane to Ardleigh Street; then travels southeast along Ardleigh Street to the point of origin."

"Visually distinct from the densely-built urban blocks" and open, city park landscape around it, this district's structures were designed between 1849 and 1922 in Gothic Revival, Italian Villa, Queen Anne, Tudor Revival, Shingle, and Colonial Revival styles of architecture.

The grounds of the Awbury Arboretum were designed by William Saunders, the prominent landscape architect who designed the Gettysburg National Cemetery and helped to design Fairmount Park. A Victorian-style garden was also created near the Francis Cope House through the joint efforts of the Philadelphia Garden Club and the Weeders Garden Club.

=== Placement of this district on the National Register of Historic Places ===
In August 2000, Philadelphia area newspapers reported that representatives of the Awbury Arboretum had submitted the necessary paperwork to initiate the creation of the Awbury Historic District and secure its placement on the National Register of Historic Places. That paperwork was then reviewed for its suitability for the NRHP by Pennsylvania's Historic Preservation Board at its March 13, 2001 meeting at 9:45 a.m. at the State Museum in Harrisburg. Also considered for NRHP status at this time were the: Protection of the Flag Monument in Athens, Pennsylvania; Normandy Farm, George K. Heller School, and Upper Roxborough Historic District in Montgomery County; Harris/Laird, Schober & Company Building in Philadelphia; Michael Derstine Farmstead in Bucks County; Chester Heights Camp Meeting Historic District in Delaware County; John Nicholas and Elizabeth Moyer House in Berks County; William Shelly School and Annex in York County; and the Zeta Psi Fraternity House in Northampton County. This district was then officially added to the National Register in May 2001, an achievement that was recognized on September 23 of that year with a day of free educational activities for the public, including tours of several of the district's most prominent homes.

This district was then also officially added to the Philadelphia Register of Historic Places in 2010.

== Contributing properties ==
There are 31 contributing buildings, including 24 homes, as well as other buildings.

- Awbury Arboretum
- Francis Cope House (1860)
- Jonathan & Rachel Cope Evans House (1872)
- Alexis T. & Elizabeth Cope House (1882–3)
- Cope/Evans Double Houses (1885–6)
- William Draper Lewis House (ca. 1892–3)
- Alfred G. & Mary Scattergood house (1909)
- William C. Kimber house (1914)
- Shippen & Esther Lewis house (1921)

== See also ==
- Philadelphia Register of Historic Places
