= William Shelly School and Annex =

- U.S. National Register of Historic Places
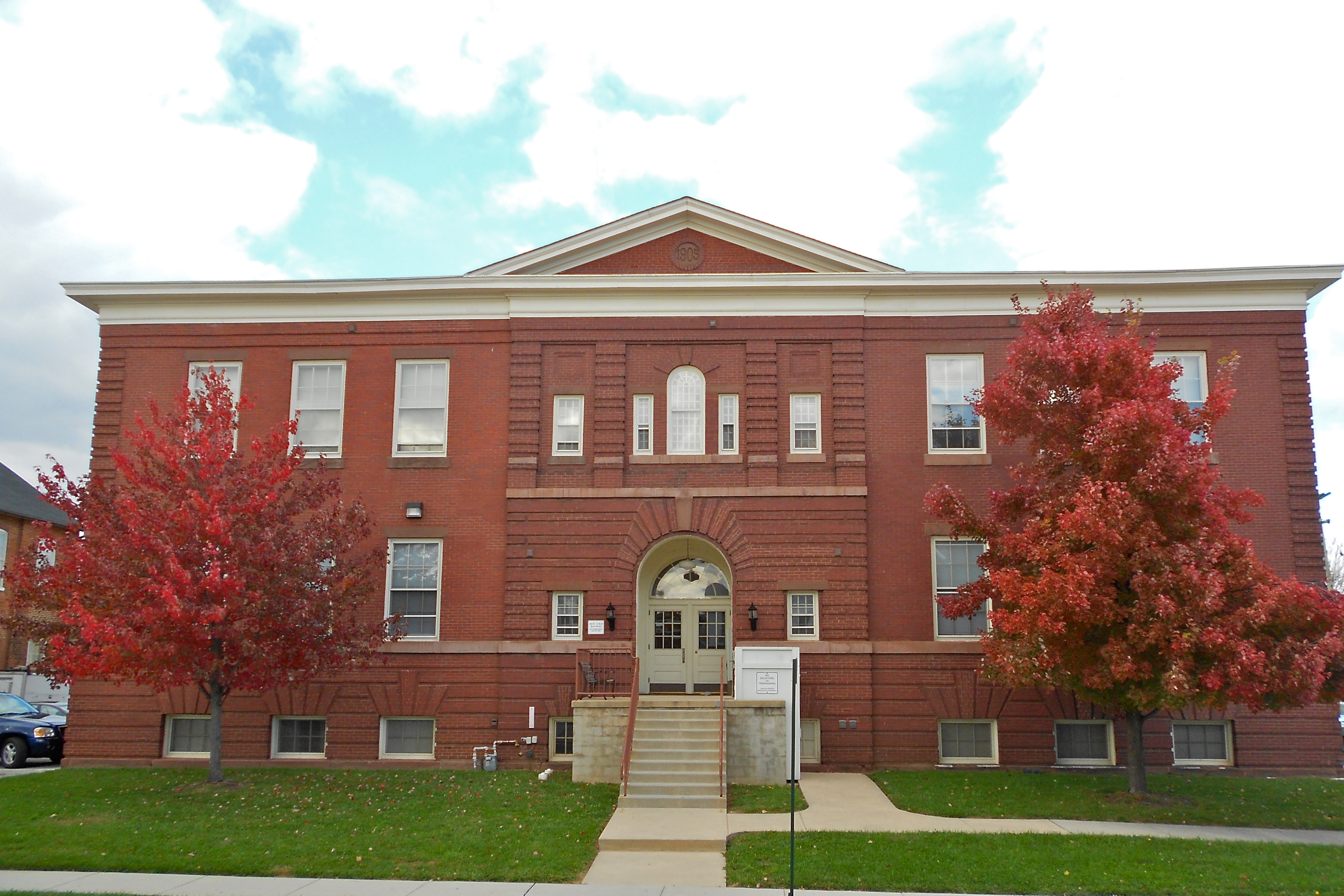

- Location within Pennsylvania Location within the United States
- Location: 201 N. Adams St., West York, Pennsylvania
- Coordinates: 39°57′22″N 76°45′40″W
- Area: 1.5 acres (0.61 ha)
- Built: c. 1897, 1905-1908
- Architect: Keyworth, Charles Augustus
- Architectural style: Renaissance
- NRHP reference No.: 01000464
- Added to NRHP: May 2, 2001

The William Shelly School and Annex, also known as the Eberton School, is a historic school building and annex located in West York, York County, Pennsylvania. Built circa 1897, the Shelly Annex was initially designed as a one-room school, but was then enlarged twice between 1898 and 1903 to become a 2 1/2-story, gable roofed brick building which is three bays wide and seven bays deep. Built between 1905 and 1908, the Shelly School was designed in the Italian Renaissance style, and is a two-story brick structure which is nine bays wide and seven bays deep. Completely rebuilt following a fire in 1919, the property was sold in 1960; the buildings were then utilized as storage facilities for the next 37 years.

It was added to the National Register of Historic Places in 2001.

== History and architectural features ==
The William Shelly School and Annex, which was built circa 1897 in West York, Pennsylvania and is also known as the Eberton School, was initially designed as a one-room school. Enlarged twice between 1898 and 1903, the annex became a 2 1/2-story, gable roofed brick building which is three bays wide and seven bays deep. Built between 1905 and 1908, the Shelly School was designed in the Renaissance Revival style, and is a two-story brick structure which is nine bays wide and seven bays deep. Completely rebuilt following a fire in 1919, the property was sold in 1960; the buildings were then utilized as storage facilities for the next 37 years.

=== Placement of this school on the National Register of Historic Places ===
The NRHP nomination application for the William Shelly School and Annex was formally reviewed by Pennsylvania's Historic Preservation Board at its March 13, 2001 meeting at 9:45 a.m. at the State Museum in Harrisburg. Also considered for NRHP status at this time were the: Protection of the Flag Monument in Athens, Pennsylvania; Normandy Farm, George K. Heller School and Upper Roxborough Historic District in Montgomery County; Awbury Historic District and Harris/Laird, Schober & Company Building in Philadelphia; Michael Derstine Farmstead in Bucks County; Chester Heights Camp Meeting Historic District in Delaware County; John Nicholas and Elizabeth Moyer House in Berks County; and the Zeta Psi Fraternity House in Northampton County.
