= George K. Heller School =

- U.S. National Register of Historic Places
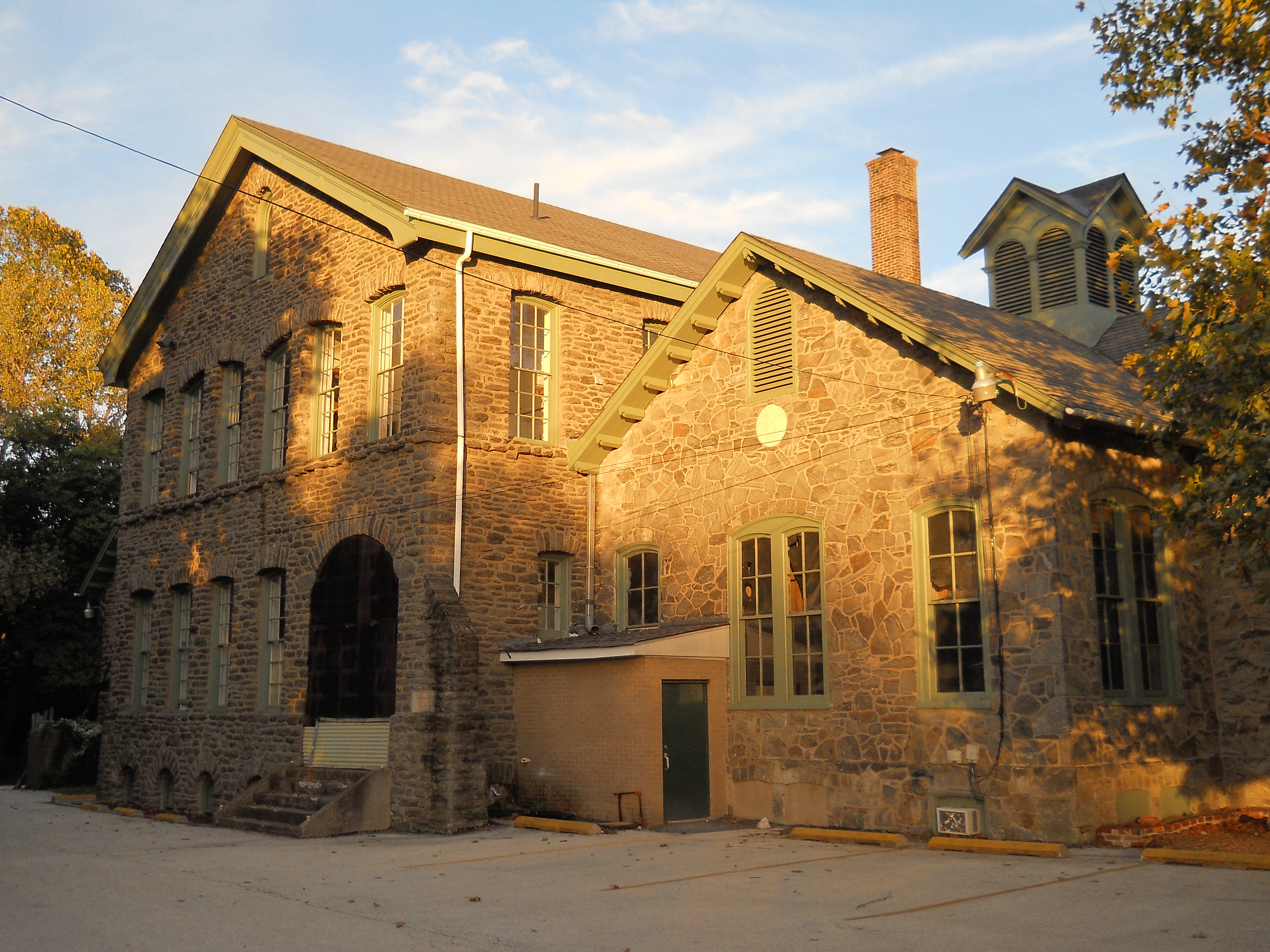
- George K. Heller School, west wing.

- Location within Philadelphia
- Location: 439 Ashbourne Road, Ashmead Village, Cheltenham Township, Pennsylvania
- Coordinates: 40°03′43″N 75°05′56″W
- Area: 1 acre (0.40 ha)
- Built: 1883
- Architect: Pool, Samuel T.
- Architectural style: Late Victorian
- NRHP reference No.: 01000461
- Added to NRHP: May 2, 2001

The George K. Heller School, also known as the Cheltenham Center for the Arts, is a historic school building located in Ashmead Village, Cheltenham Township, Montgomery County, Pennsylvania. It was originally built in 1883 to house the first Cheltenham High School, and expanded in 1893 and 1906. Later additions took place between 1963 and 1969, after it was converted to the Cheltenham Center for the Arts. The stone school building ranges from 1 1/2- to 2 1/2-stories and has intersecting gable roofs. The roof is topped by a square cupola. A school was located on this site as early as 1795 and it was considered the oldest public school site in continuous use at the time of its closing in 1953.

It was listed on the National Register of Historic Places in 2001.

== History and architectural features ==
With educational activities having taken place on this site as early as 1795, this historic property was considered by historians to the oldest public school site in continuous use in the region at the time of its closing in 1953. Built on this site in 1883, the George K. Heller School (Cheltenham Center for the Arts) was designed to house the first Cheltenham High School; it was then subsequently expanded in 1893 and 1906 with other additions erected in 1963 and 1969 after the structure was converted to the Cheltenham Center for the Arts. Ranging from 1 1/2- to 2 1/2-stories, this stone school has intersecting gable roofs, topped by a square cupola.

=== Placement on the National Register of Historic Places ===
The NRHP nomination application for the George K. Heller School was formally reviewed by Pennsylvania's Historic Preservation Board at its March 13, 2001 meeting at 9:45 a.m. at the State Museum in Harrisburg. Also considered for NRHP status at this time were the: Protection of the Flag Monument in Athens, Pennsylvania; Normandy Farm and Upper Roxborough Historic District in Montgomery County; Awbury Historic District and Harris/Laird, Schober & Company Building in Philadelphia; Michael Derstine Farmstead in Bucks County; Chester Heights Camp Meeting Historic District in Delaware County; John Nicholas and Elizabeth Moyer House in Berks County; William Shelly School and Annex in York County; and the Zeta Psi Fraternity House in Northampton County.
