= John Nicholas and Elizabeth Moyer House =

Historic house in Pennsylvania, United States

- U.S. National Register of Historic Places
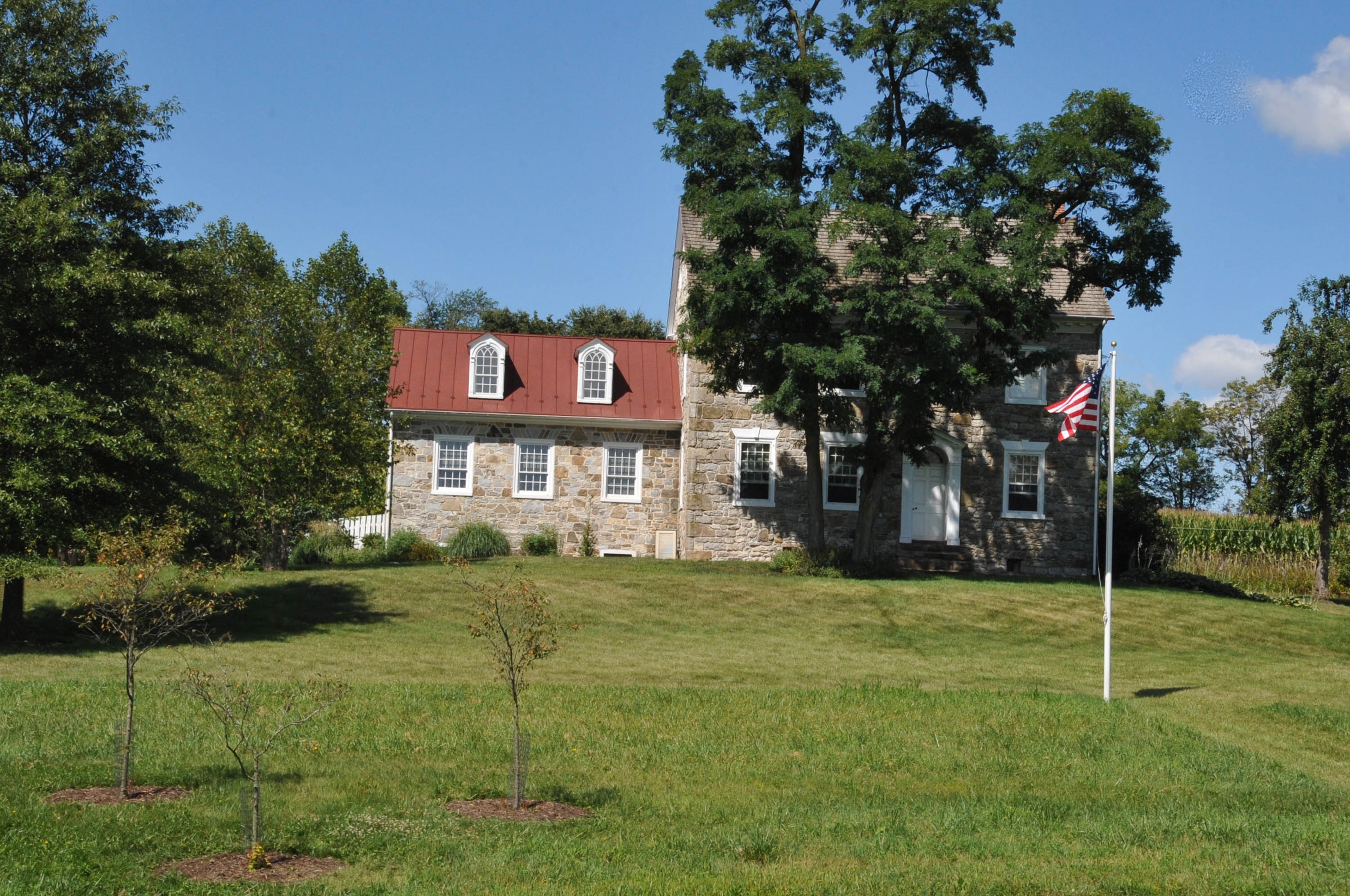

- Location within Pennsylvania Location within the United States
- Location: 152 Hetrick Road, Jefferson Township, Pennsylvania
- Coordinates: 40°25′29″N 76°10′34″W
- Area: 3.5 acres (1.4 ha)
- Built: c. 1817, c. 1818-1820
- Architectural style: Georgian, Federal, and Pennsylvania German Vernacular
- NRHP reference No.: 01000459
- Added to NRHP: May 2, 2001

The John Nicholas and Elizabeth Moyer House, also known as Richland, is a historic home located in Jefferson Township in Berks County, Pennsylvania. Built circa 1817, it is a 2 1/2-story, four-over-four stone dwelling. A stone summer kitchen, which was built between 1818 and 1820, is attached to the rear. Frame additions were added in 1998.

== History and architectural features ==
Built circa 1817 in what is now Jefferson Township in Berks County, Pennsylvania, the John Nicholas and Elizabeth Moyer House, also known as Richland, is a 2 1/2-story, four-over-four stone dwelling with a stone summer kitchen, which was added to the rear of the structure between 1818 and 1820. The house reflects Georgian and Federal styles of architecture, and also has touches of Pennsylvania German vernacular design. Frame additions were subsequently erected in 1998. The house reflects Georgian, Federal, and Pennsylvania German Vernacular design influences.

=== Placement of this residence on the National Register of Historic Places ===
The NRHP nomination application for the John Nicholas and Elizabeth Moyer House was formally reviewed by Pennsylvania's Historic Preservation Board at its March 13, 2001 meeting at 9:45 a.m. at the State Museum in Harrisburg. Also considered for NRHP status at this time were the: Protection of the Flag Monument in Athens, Pennsylvania; Normandy Farm, George K. Heller School and Upper Roxborough Historic District in Montgomery County; Awbury Historic District and Harris/Laird, Schober & Company Building in Philadelphia; Michael Derstine Farmstead in Bucks County; Chester Heights Camp Meeting Historic District in Delaware County; William Shelly School and Annex in York County; and the Zeta Psi Fraternity House in Northampton County.

The John Nicholas and Elizabeth Moyer House was then officially listed on the National Register of Historic Places later in 2001.
