= Upper Roxborough Historic District =

Historic district in Pennsylvania, United States

- U.S. National Register of Historic Places
- U.S. Historic district
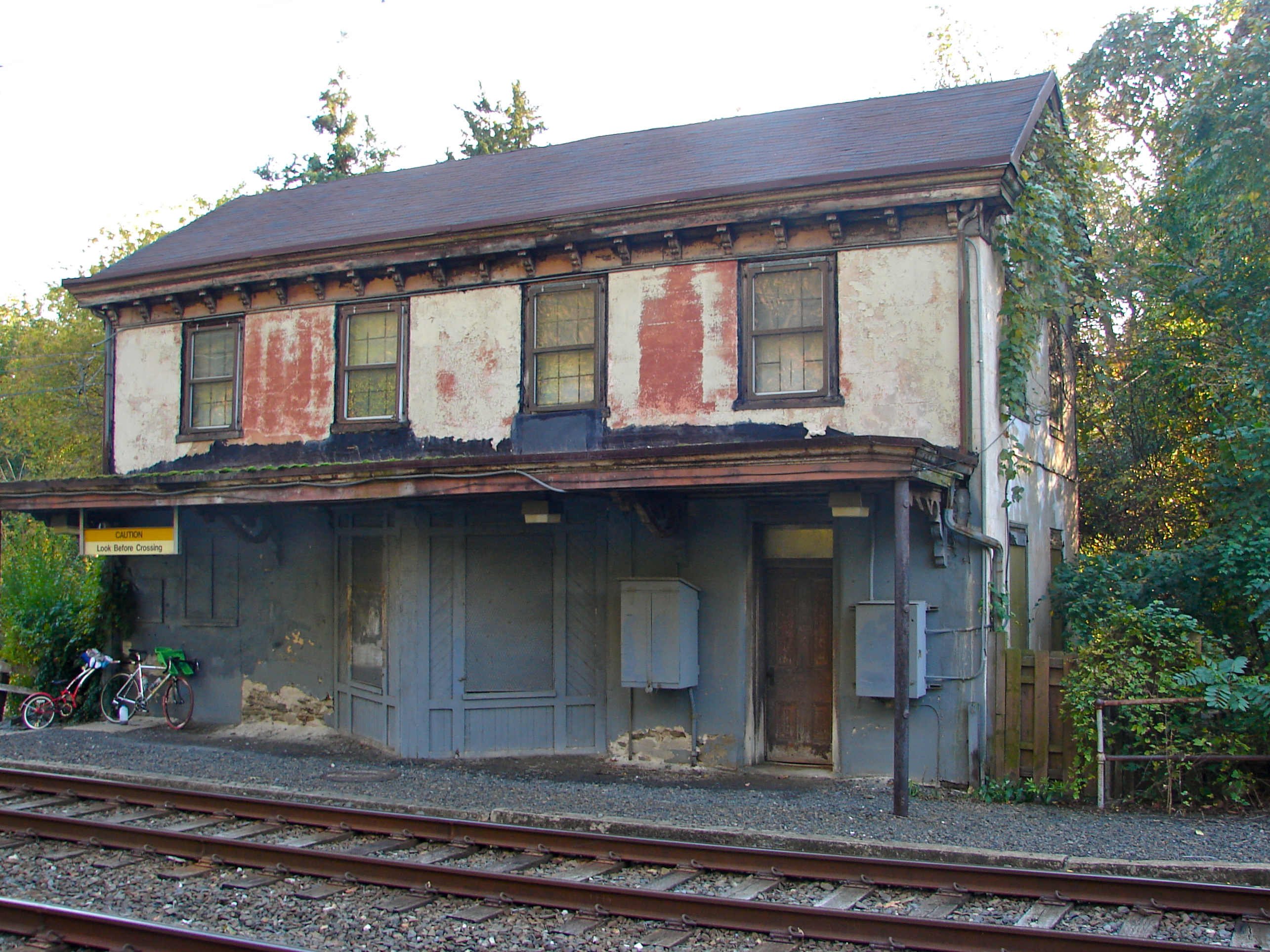
- Shawmont Railroad Station (1834), Nixon Lane, Upper Roxborough Historic District, October 2010

- Location within Pennsylvania Location within the United States
- Location: Roughly bounded by Shawmont Ave., Hagy's Mill Rd., and Schuylkill R., Philadelphia and Whitemarsh Township, Pennsylvania
- Coordinates: 40°03′29″N 75°15′06″W
- Area: 711 acres (288 ha)
- Architects: Frank Furness; Robert Rodes McGoodwin, et al.
- Architectural style: Colonial, Greek Revival, et al.
- NRHP reference No.: 01000463, 04001226 (Boundary Increase)
- Added to NRHP: May 2, 2001, November 12, 2004 (Boundary Increase)

Upper Roxborough Historic District is a national historic district located in Philadelphia and Whitemarsh Township, Montgomery County, Pennsylvania. It encompasses 108 contributing buildings, 23 contributing sites, and 18 contributing structures in Upper Roxborough. The district includes a number of small scale farm and industrial workers' housing, estate houses, mill-owners' dwellings, and farm buildings.

Notable buildings in the district include the Shawmont Railroad Station (1834), Miquon Station (formerly Lafayette) designed by Frank Furness (1910), Riverside Paper Mills (c. 1720-1730), Hagy's Mill ruin, St. Mary's Church, and "Fairview" (c. 1856) and other buildings on the grounds of Schuylkill Center for Environmental Education The Roxborough Pumping Station (c. 1860) was also part of the district, but it was demolished in 2011 after sitting abandoned for over fifty years.

It was added to the National Register of Historic Places in 2001.

== History and architectural features ==
Established in 2001, the Upper Roxborough Historic District is a United States national historic district in Philadelphia, Pennsylvania, which encompasses 108 contributing buildings, 23 contributing sites, and 18 contributing structures in Upper Roxborough. Among those structures are a number of small scale farms, industrial worker dwellings, estate houses, and mill owner homes. Notable buildings include the: Shawmont and Miquon SEPTA stations (1834 and 1910), the latter of which was designed by Frank Furness, Riverside Paper Mills (c. 1720-1730), Hagy's Mill ruin, St. Mary's Church, and "Fairview" (c. 1856), as well as additional buildings on the grounds of the Schuylkill Center for Environmental Education. The Roxborough Pumping Station (c. 1860) was also part of the district, but it was demolished in 2011 after sitting abandoned for more than fifty years.

=== Placement of this district on the National Register of Historic Places ===
The NRHP nomination application for the Upper Roxborough Historic District was formally reviewed by Pennsylvania's Historic Preservation Board at its March 13, 2001 meeting at 9:45 a.m. at the State Museum in Harrisburg. Also considered for NRHP status at this time were the: Protection of the Flag Monument in Athens, Pennsylvania; Normandy Farm and George K. Heller School in Montgomery County; Awbury Historic District and Harris/Laird, Schober & Company Building in Philadelphia; Michael Derstine Farmstead in Bucks County; Chester Heights Camp Meeting Historic District in Delaware County; John Nicholas and Elizabeth Moyer House in Berks County; William Shelly School and Annex in York County; and the Zeta Psi Fraternity House in Northampton County.

The Upper Roxborough Historic District was then officially added to the National Register of Historic Places later in 2001.

== Gallery ==
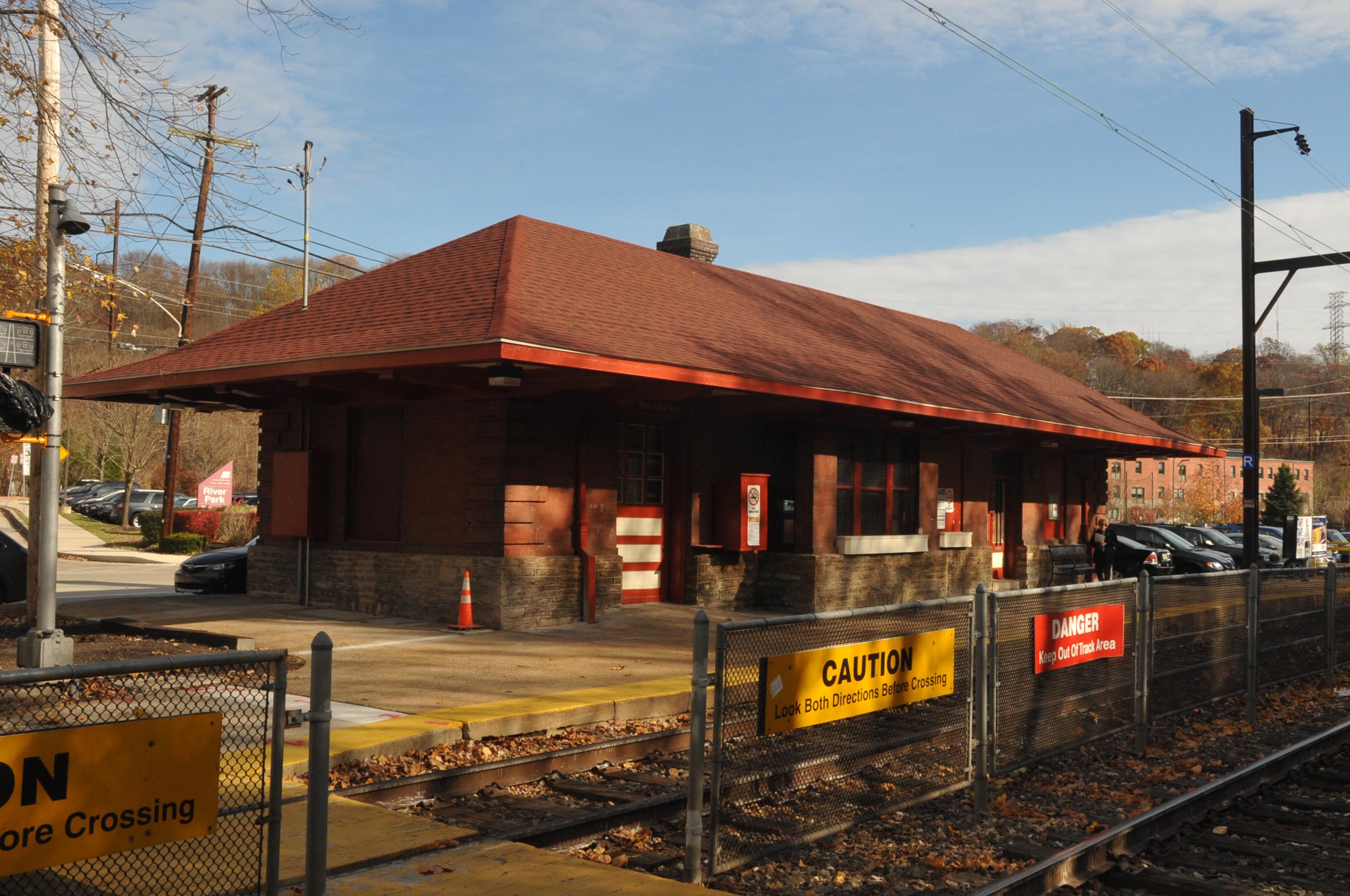
Miquon Station

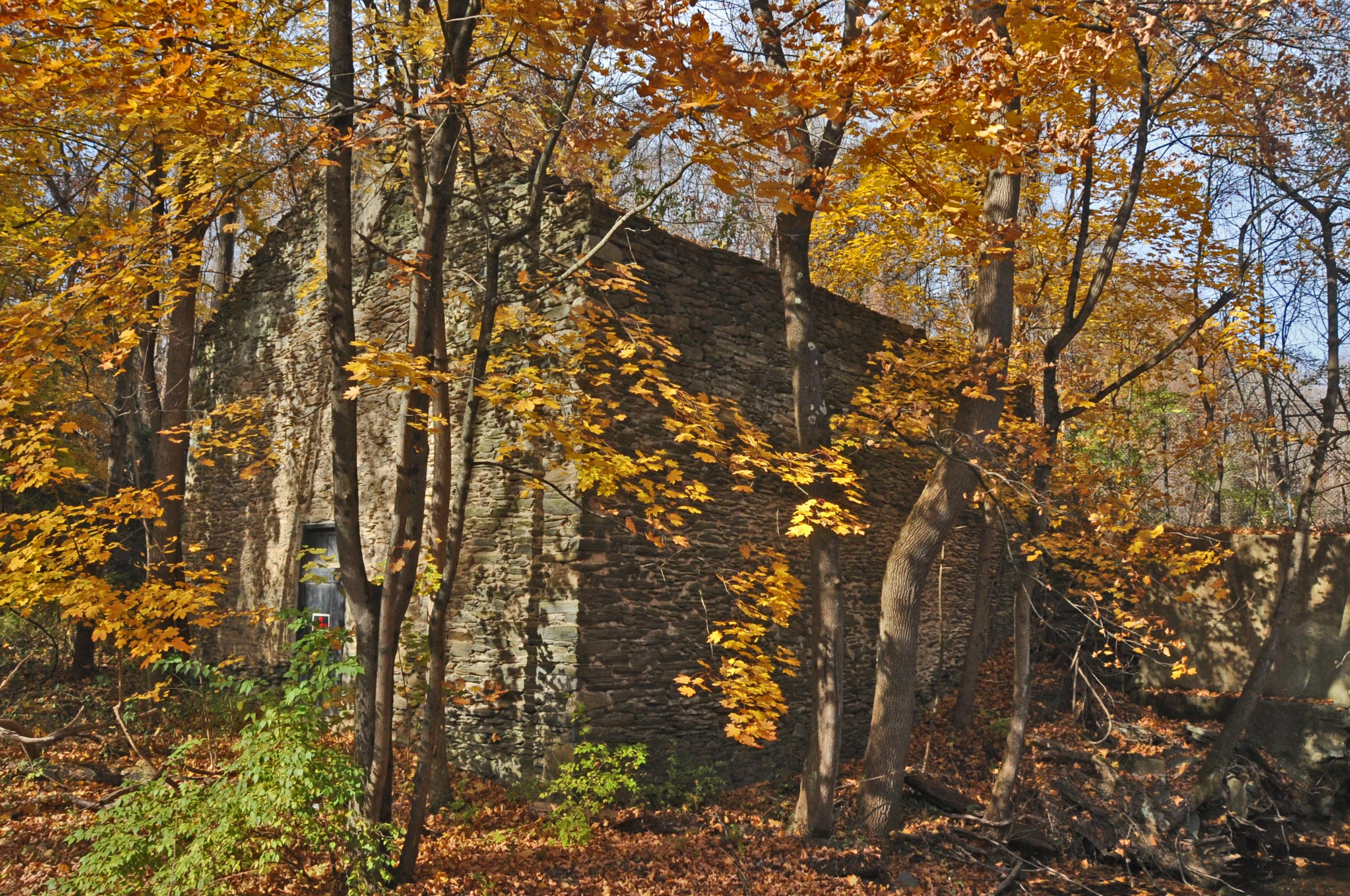
Hagy's Mill
