= Ashmead Village, Pennsylvania =

Unincorporated community in Pennsylvania, US

Rowland Park, Pennsylvania
- Unincorporated community
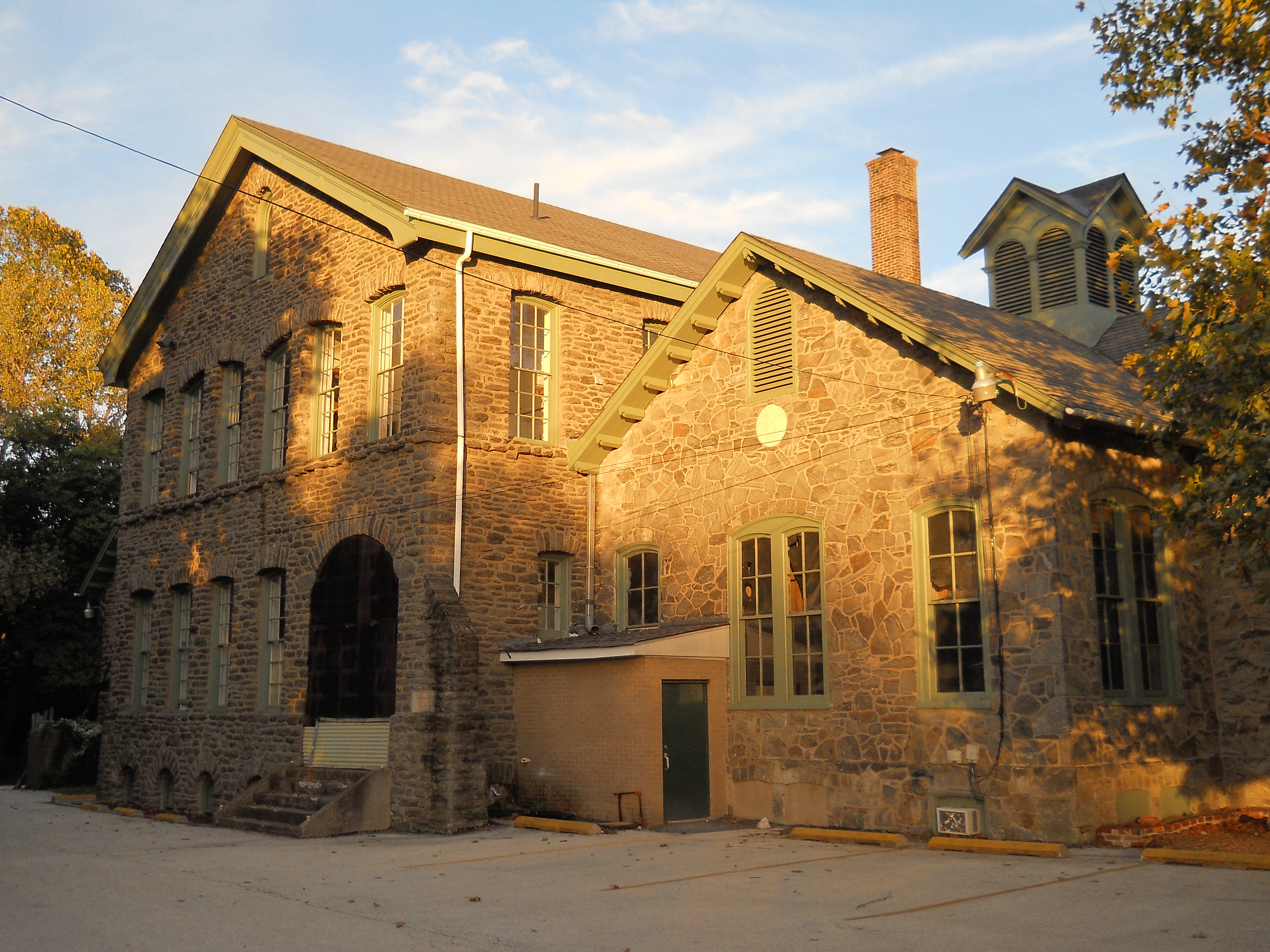
- The George K. Heller School

- Location within Pennsylvania Location within the United States
- Coordinates: 40°03′42″N 75°05′57″W
- Country: United States
- State: Pennsylvania
- County: Montgomery
- Elevation: 135 ft (41 m)
- Time zone: UTC-5 (Eastern (EST))
  - Summer (DST): UTC-4 (EDT)
- Area codes: 215, 267 and 445
- GNIS feature ID: 1202992

Rowland Park is an unincorporated community in Cheltenham Township, Montgomery County, Pennsylvania, United States. The George K. Heller School, now the Cheltenham Center for the Arts, which is listed on the National Register of Historic Places, is located in Ashmead Village.
