= Chamberlain-Pennell House =

Historic house in Pennsylvania, United States

- U.S. National Register of Historic Places
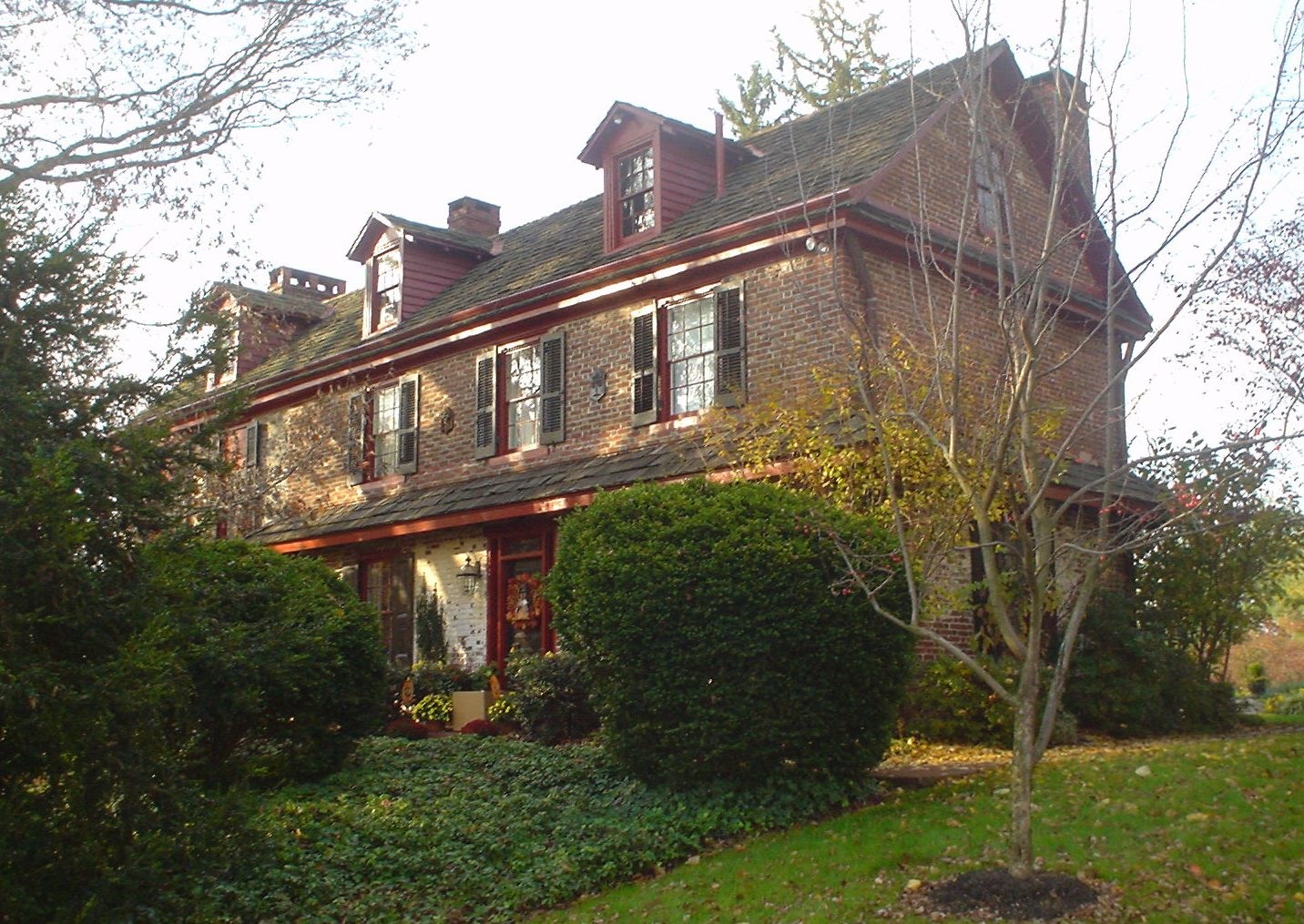
- Chamberlain Pennel House, November 2009

- Location within Pennsylvania Location within the United States
- Location: West of Media off U.S. Route 1 at Valley Brook Road, Chester Heights, Pennsylvania
- Coordinates: 39°53′52″N 75°28′47″W
- Area: 2.5 acres (1.0 ha)
- Built: c. 1722
- Architect: Stanton, W. Macy
- Architectural style: Hall, passage, parlor plan
- NRHP reference No.: 77001165
- Added to NRHP: December 27, 1977

The Chamberlain-Pennell House, also known as Hill of Skye, is a historic home located at Chester Heights, Delaware County, Pennsylvania. The building was built about 1722 and "modernized" in the mid-19th century. The 2 1/2-story, brick house in configured in a "hall, passage, parlor" plan. A 1 1/2-story kitchen wing was added to the west side sometime before 1798.

It was added to the National Register of Historic Places on December 27, 1977.

== See also ==
- National Register of Historic Places listings in Delaware County, Pennsylvania
