= Chester Heights, Pennsylvania =

Borough in Pennsylvania, US

- Borough
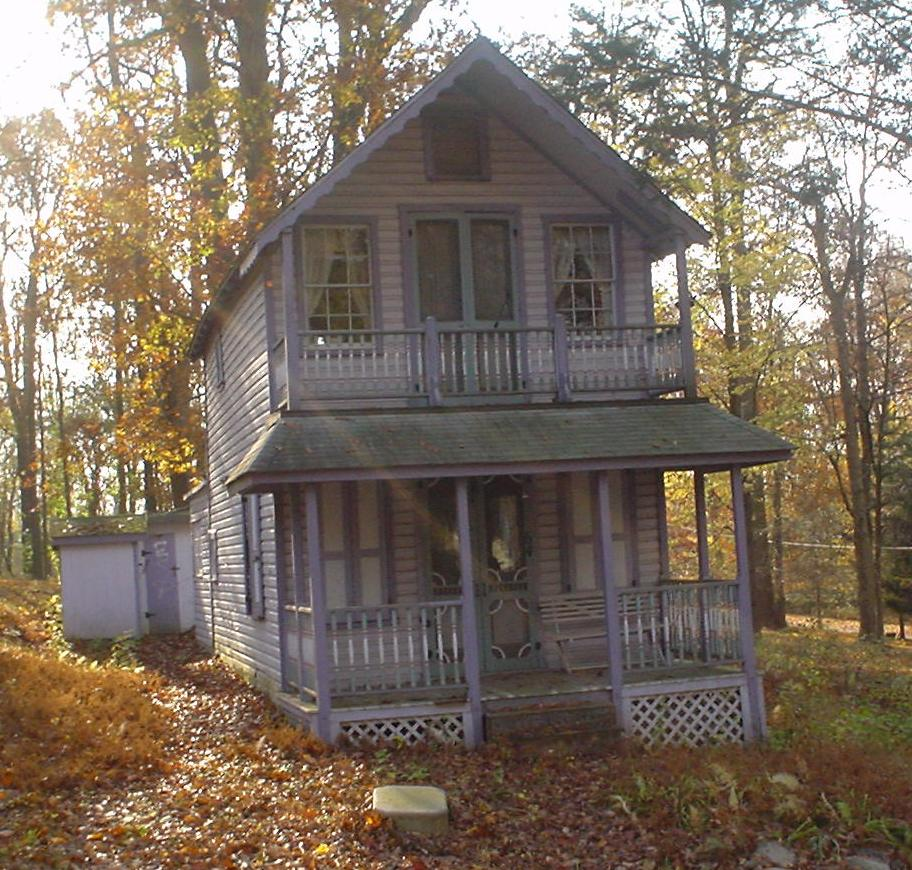
- Chester Heights Camp Meeting Historic District

- Location in Delaware County and the U.S. state of Pennsylvania

- Location of Chester Heights in Pennsylvania Chester Heights (the United States)
- Coordinates: 39°53′22″N 75°28′15″W
- Country: United States
- State: Pennsylvania
- County: Delaware
- Incorporated: 1945

Area
  - Total: 2.22 sq mi (5.74 km^{2})
  - Land: 2.21 sq mi (5.73 km^{2})
  - Water: 0.0039 sq mi (0.01 km^{2})
- Elevation: 131 ft (40 m)

Population (2020)
  - Total: 2,897
  - Density: 1,308.7/sq mi (505.29/km^{2})
- Time zone: UTC-5 (EST)
  - Summer (DST): UTC-4 (EDT)
- ZIP code: 19017
- Area codes: 610 and 484
- FIPS code: 42-13232
- Website: www.chesterheights.org

Chester Heights is a borough in Delaware County, Pennsylvania, United States. As of the 2020 census, Chester Heights had a population of 2,897. Most of the borough lies south of U.S. 1, about a mile southwest of Wawa.

== History ==
The history of Chester Heights predates grants of William Penn, when the Swedes had penetrated some distance inland from the Delaware River and had found the rich soil very conducive to productive farming. To a remarkable extent, the area had continued to be so used until the last decade. In the 18th and 19th centuries, the borough was part of Aston Township, though this northernmost section of Aston did not have a village aspect as such. With the advent of a railroad, which made its first run-through on Christmas Day 1833, a concentration of houses developed. With the reach of the automobile, a settlement of homes sprang up along the oldest road in the borough. That route, now Valleybrook Road, was once known as the "Logtown Road" and was one of the earliest routes from Chester settlement to the interior. It wanders over and along the West Branch of Chester Creek and is noted for its abrupt curves at the borough's southern end.

An 1836 school building on Valleybrook Road and Llewellyn Road was, in its day, rented by its owners to Aston for $2 a month for use as the school for this area. It was subsequently known as the Logtown School and changed to the Chester Heights School in 1880. A second, much later stone school building stands in its place today. The borough was the Fourth Ward of Aston and had been referred to for some time as Chester Heights and Wawa. It was in the northern or "Wawa" area that, over the past one hundred years or more, several large land parcels were acquired for summer residences. To date, most of these tracts have remained relatively unchanged, though they are now used as year-round private residences. ("Wawa" was the Indian name for wild goose.)

In 1852 the cornerstone of St. Thomas the Apostle Church was laid, to house a Roman Catholic congregation that had been meeting on the property of the Willcox family since 1728. It stands today with the addition of a modern church, parochial school and residences. In 1872 an association of Methodists purchased a farm in Aston, incorporating as the Chester Heights Camp-Meeting Associations, and it still convenes each July for religious retreats. The borough of Chester Heights was officially incorporated in 1945.

Today, approximately one dozen early fieldstone or brick dwellings remain intact, though not necessarily restored. The oldest homes date to 1720 or earlier; many of them were established by 1777 when "a number of the stragglers from the defeated American Army, hungry, demoralized and exhausted in their flight from the field at Brandywine, collected in the neighborhood of Logtown, where they passed the night, sleeping in the outbuildings and open fields." Altogether, the houses represent an historically valuable span of 18th century to Victorian architecture in the borough.

The Chester Heights Camp Meeting Historic District, Chamberlain-Pennell House, and Stonehaven are listed on the National Register of Historic Places.

Chester Heights was also the home of the fictional Grogan family from the 2008 movie "Marley and Me".

== Geography ==
Chester Heights is located in western Delaware County at 39°53′22″N 75°28′15″W (39.889539, -75.470931). It is bordered to the southeast by Aston Township, to the west by Concord Township, to the north by Thornbury Township, and to the northeast, across Chester Creek, by Middletown Township.

According to the United States Census Bureau, the borough has a total area of 2.2 square miles (5.7 km^{2}), all land.

=== Climate ===
The climate in this area is characterized by hot, humid summers and generally cool to cold winters. According to the Köppen Climate Classification system, Chester Heights has a hot-summer humid continental climate, abbreviated "Dfa" on climate maps. The local hardiness zone is 7a. On June 23, 2015, the borough suffered significant wind damage in one of its strongest severe thunderstorms to strike the area. Many trees fell, and many power poles snapped. Nearby locations were later given a disaster declaration. At nearby Philadelphia International Airport, a wind gust of 71 miles per hour was recorded from the storm.

Climate data for Chester Heights, Pennsylvania
Month	Jan	Feb	Mar	Apr	May	Jun	Jul	Aug	Sep	Oct	Nov	Dec	Year
Mean daily maximum °C (°F)	5 (41)	6 (43)	11 (52)	18 (64)	23 (74)	29 (84)	31 (88)	30 (86)	26 (79)	19 (67)	13 (55)	7 (45)	18 (65)
Daily mean °C (°F)	1 (34)	2 (36)	7 (44)	13 (55)	18 (65)	23 (74)	26 (79)	25 (77)	21 (70)	15 (59)	9 (48)	3 (38)	13 (56)
Mean daily minimum °C (°F)	−2 (28)	−2 (29)	2 (36)	7 (45)	13 (55)	18 (65)	21 (70)	20 (68)	16 (61)	10 (50)	5 (41)	−1 (31)	9 (48)
Average precipitation cm (inches)	7.6 (3)	6.6 (2.6)	9.4 (3.7)	8.6 (3.4)	9.1 (3.6)	8.9 (3.5)	11 (4.3)	9.9 (3.9)	9.7 (3.8)	7.4 (2.9)	8.4 (3.3)	8.1 (3.2)	105 (41.3)
Source: Weatherbase

== Transportation ==
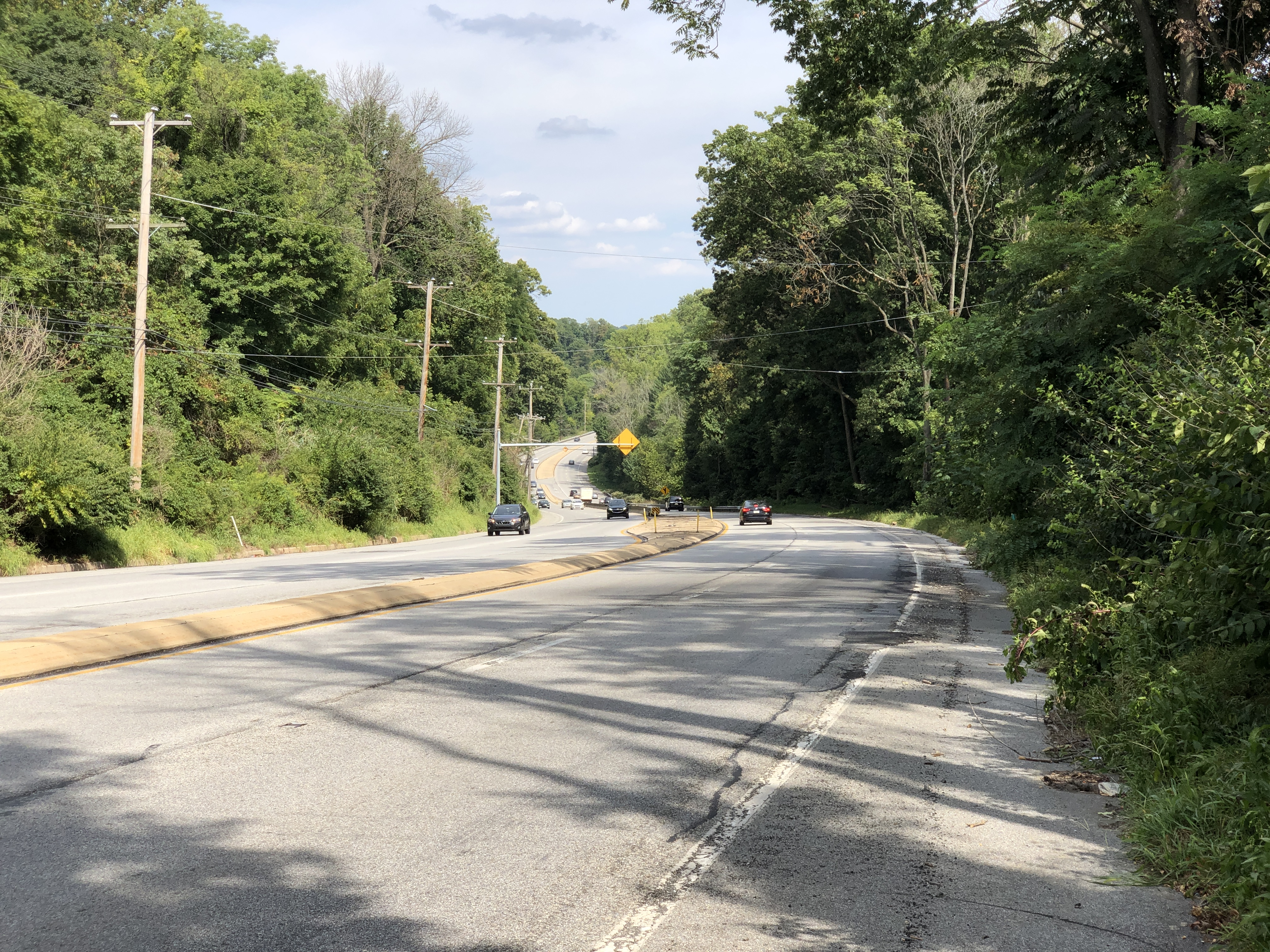
US 1 northbound in Chester Heights

As of 2008, there were 10.42 miles (16.77 km) of public roads in Chester Heights, of which 7.90 miles (12.71 km) were maintained by the Pennsylvania Department of Transportation (PennDOT) and 2.52 miles (4.06 km) were maintained by the borough.

U.S. Route 1 is the only numbered highway serving Chester Heights. It follows the Baltimore Pike along a southwest-to-northeast alignment across the northwestern portion of the borough. US 1 leads northeast 20 miles (32 km) to Philadelphia and southwest 13 miles (21 km) to Kennett Square. Chester is 7 miles (11 km) to the southeast via Valleybrook Road and Concord Road.

== Demographics ==
Historical population
Census	Pop.	Note	%±
1950	474		—
1960	534		12.7%
1970	597		11.8%
1980	1,302		118.1%
1990	2,273		74.6%
2000	2,481		9.2%
2010	2,531		2.0%
2020	2,897		14.5%

As of Census 2010, the racial makeup of the borough was 92.1% White, 3.3% African American, 3.2% Asian, 0.2% from other races, and 1.2% from two or more races. Hispanic or Latino of any race were 1.5% of the population .

As of the census of 2000, there were 2,481 people, 1,056 households, and 664 families residing in the borough. The population density was 1,184.8 inhabitants per square mile (457.5/km^{2}). There were 1,117 housing units at an average density of 533.4 per square mile (205.9/km^{2}). The racial makeup of the borough was 93.67% White, 2.30% African American, 0.08% Native American, 1.89% Asian, 0.12% Pacific Islander, 0.28% from other races, and 1.65% from two or more races. Hispanic or Latino of any race were 1.29% of the population.

There were 1,056 households, out of which 29.3% had children under the age of 18 living with them, 49.7% were married couples living together, 9.8% had a female householder with no husband present, and 37.1% were non-families. 29.9% of all households were made up of individuals, and 6.3% had someone living alone who was 65 years of age or older. The average household size was 2.32 and the average family size was 2.93.

In the borough the population was spread out, with 23.1% under the age of 18, 6.0% from 18 to 24, 35.2% from 25 to 44, 26.4% from 45 to 64, and 9.3% who were 65 years of age or older. The median age was 37 years. For every 100 females there were 89.4 males. For every 100 females age 18 and over, there were 85.5 males.

The median income for a household in the borough was $70,236, and the median income for a family was $74,375. Males had a median income of $51,835 versus $43,750 for females. The per capita income for the borough was $37,707. About 2.6% of families and 4.3% of the population were below the poverty line, including 5.2% of those under age 18 and 3.1% of those age 65 or over.

== Economy ==
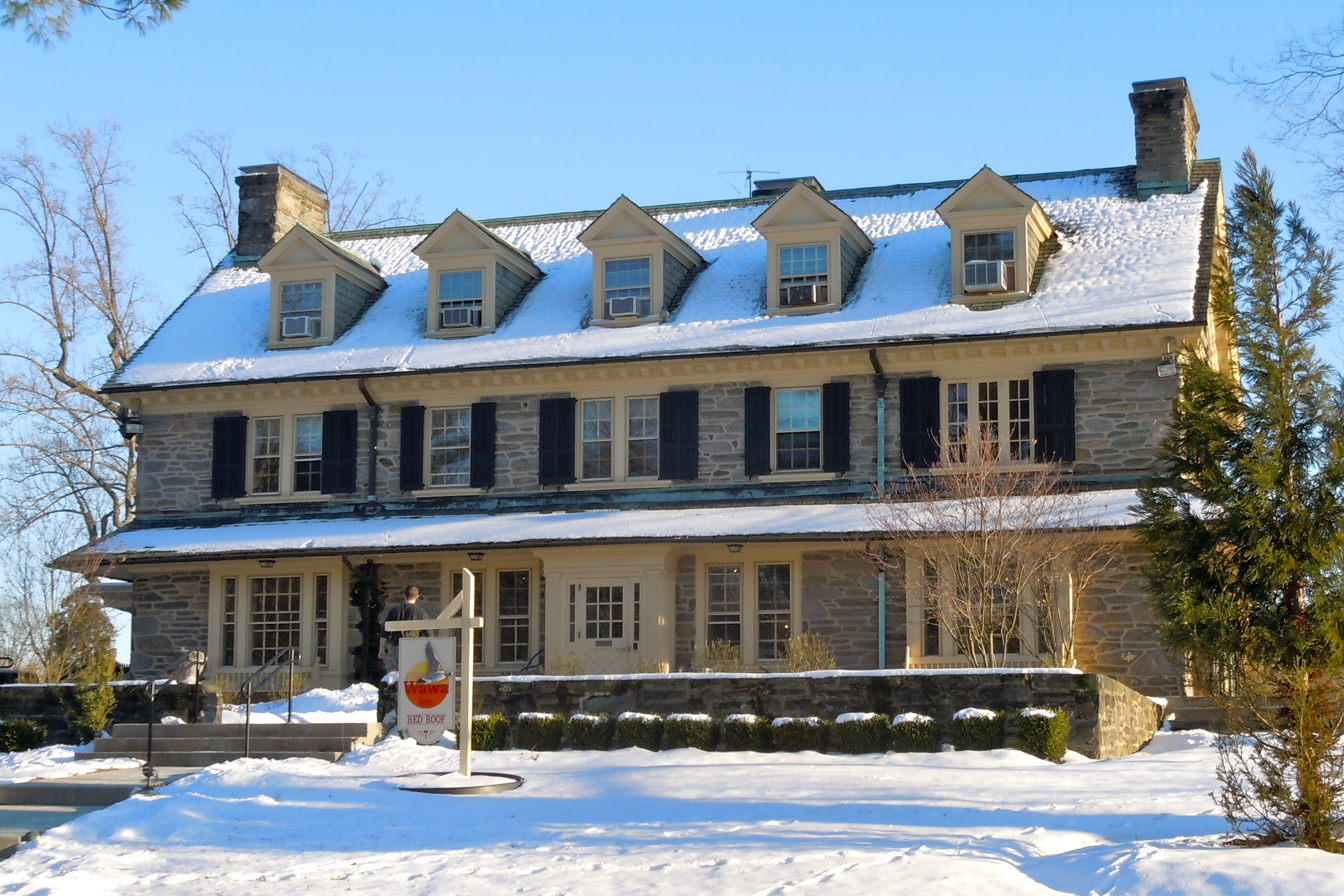
A building of the Wawa Food Markets headquarters

Wawa Food Markets has its headquarters in Chester Heights, within the Wawa area. As of 2011, approximately 300 employees worked in the headquarters. The Borough of Chester Heights receives a majority of its local services tax from employees of Wawa.

== Education ==
Rachel Kohl Library serves Chester Heights.

Chester Heights lies within the Garnet Valley School District. Public school students living within borough boundaries attend Concord Elementary School for grades K-2, Garnet Valley Elementary School for grades K-5, Garnet Valley Middle School for grades 6-8, and Garnet Valley High School for grades 9-12.

== Chester Heights Fire Company ==
The Chester Heights Fire Company was formed in 1947. The station operates as Chester Heights Fire Company with the Delaware County fire radio as Station 71. The organization is located at the corner of Valleybrook Road and Llewellyn Road. The fire station currently operates an engine (Engine 71), a medium duty rescue (Rescue 71), a QRS (Quick Response Service) (QRS 71) and a utility pickup truck (Utility 71). The fire company is fully volunteer and serves the borough of Chester Heights in addition to a select portion of Thornbury Township. The organization also provides mutual aid in surrounding townships. In May 2015 the organization completed a new facility on the site of the prior building. The company today has approximately 20 members.
