= Stonehaven (Media, Pennsylvania) =

Historic house in Pennsylvania, United States

- U.S. National Register of Historic Places
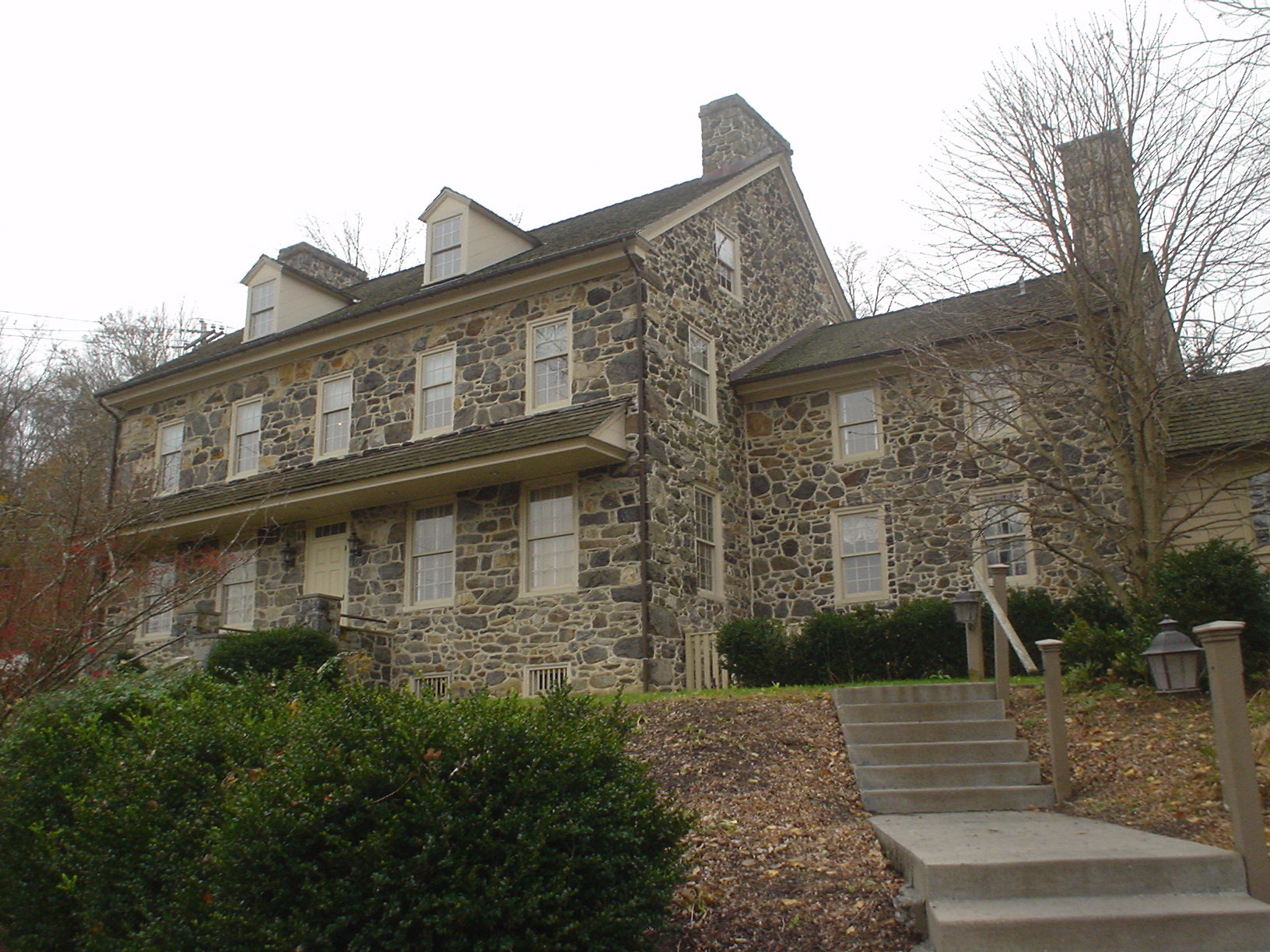
- Stonehaven, November 2009

- Location within Pennsylvania Location within the United States
- Location: 484 Lenni Road, junction with New Road, Chester Heights, Pennsylvania
- Coordinates: 39°53′35″N 75°27′9″W
- Area: 1.4 acres (0.57 ha)
- Built: 1799
- Architectural style: Georgian
- NRHP reference No.: 96001197
- Added to NRHP: October 24, 1996

"Stonehaven", also known as the John and Sarah Lundgren House, is an historic home that is located in Chester Heights, Delaware County, Pennsylvania, United States.

It was added to the National Register of Historic Places in 1996.

== History and architectural features ==
The original section of this historic structure was built in 1799, and is a 2 1/2-story, five-bay by two-bay stone building. It is a vernacular, Federal-era dwelling with a Georgian plan. A two-bay, stone kitchen addition was built in 1811, and a wood-frame section was added to that after 1910.
