= Zeta Psi Fraternity House at Lafayette College =

Historic house in Pennsylvania, United States

- U.S. National Register of Historic Places
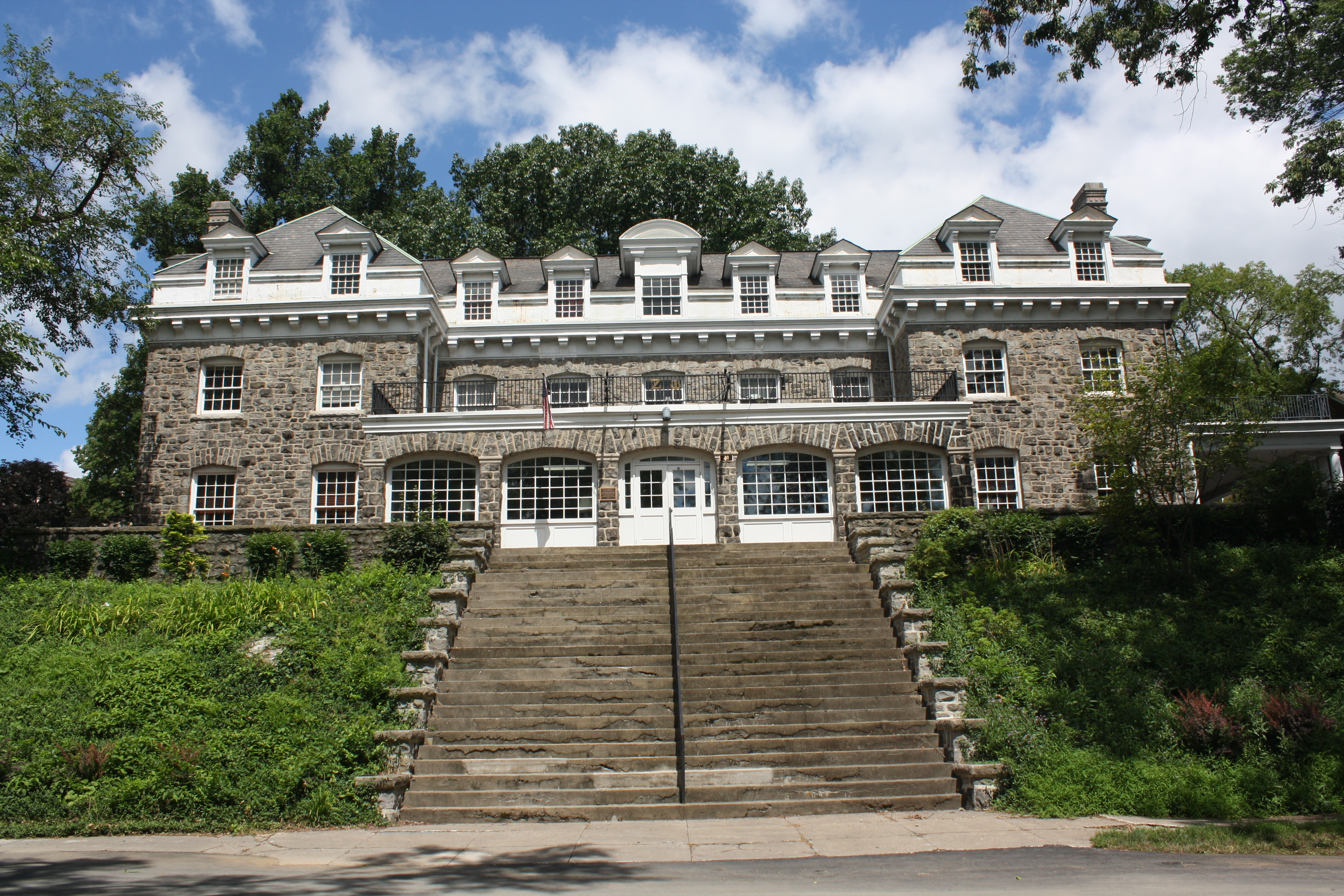
- Zeta Psi Fraternity House at Lafayette College. August 2013.

- Location within Pennsylvania Location within the United States
- Location: 49 S. College Dr., Easton, Pennsylvania
- Coordinates: 40°41′51″N 75°12′28″W
- Area: 9.9 acres (4.0 ha)
- Built: 1909-1910
- Architect: Michler, William Marsh; Baker, James Barnes
- Architectural style: Late 19th And 20th Century Revivals
- NRHP reference No.: 01000506
- Added to NRHP: May 21, 2001

The Zeta Psi Fraternity House at Lafayette College is a historic house located on the campus of Lafayette College in Easton, Northampton County, Pennsylvania. The Tau Chapter of the Zeta Psi fraternity built the house between 1909 and 1910. It was added to the National Register of Historic Places in 2001.

== History ==
The Tau chapter of the Zeta Psi fraternity was chartered at Lafayette College in Easton, Northampton County, Pennsylvania in 1857; it was the third fraternity on campus. Fraternities were not allowed to have chapter houses until October 1900, when the college's trustees viewed this as a partial solution to a campus housing shortage and established new policies. As a result, Zeta Psi met at various locations, including an office building in downtown Easton that a fraternity brother owned. The fraternity also rented space to hold its annual ball.

By the fraternity's national convention in January 1907, the chapter had plans for a chapter house to present for approval. Zeta Psi chapter built its chapter house between 1909 and 1910 on the campus of Lafayette College. It is located on 9.9 acres on 49 S. College Street. The chapter house was the largest event space in the city and became a social hub of the campus and city. It new chapter house helped elevate Zeta Psi to the top position amongst campus fraternites.

The chapter house was a training center for Reserve Officer Training Corps during World War I. The chapter declined during the war era due to declining grades and an off-campus meeting location. However, it revived in the 1920s, with members gaining academic honors and key positions in student government. However, the fraternity's connections to the Easton community declined, along with its finances, during the Great Depression and World War II.

Beginning in September 2014, the house was unoccupied due to the suspension of Tau chapter by Lafayette College for five years. During the suspension, the fraternity was prohibited from occupying its chapter house. The college started using the Zeta Psi Fraternity House as an all-male dormitory in the fall of 2015, housing first-year students. The dorm was referred to as 49 South College Drive.

The Tau chapter was officially recognized and reinstated by Lafayette College during the 2018–2019 academic year. The house is no longer used as a dormitory.

== Architecture ==
The Zeta Psi Fraternity House at Lafayette College was designed by architects William March Michler of Easton and James Barnes Baker of New York, both Zeta Psi members and civil engineering graduates of Lafayette College. The general contractor was Amanndus Steinmetz and Streepy and Strickland were the stonemasons. Michler's brother, Roosevelt Michler, was its interior decorator, securing interior fittings and furnishings Construction cost between $35,000 and $43,000 ($1,254,167 to 1,540,833 in 2022 money).

Built between 1909 and 1910, the Zeta Psi Fraternity House is a 2 1/2-story, nine-bay wide, rock-faced granite building with a dormered hipped roof. Its exterior features a heavy eave cornice, prominent chimney stacks, and projecting facade pavilions while its interior reflects both Colonial Revival and Arts and Crafts styles of architecture. It follows an American vernacular style, although it was called an English manor when built, and conveys the importance of fraternities to the campus at the time. Its roof is grey slate.

There is a five-bay sunporch on the front of the building on the south side. Its granite piers, a flat roof, and is accessed through double French doors. It has skylights and opens to a wide terrace, accessed via steps with an iron handrail. A similar porch was originally on the west side of the house but has since been removed. There is a three-bay porte cochere on the east side of the house that mimics the details of the sun porch.

Inside the house features an open floorplan with a reception hall, a library, a billiard room, and a dining room. The reception hall also opens to the sun porch. All four rooms feature Colonial Revival fireplace mantles with Arts and Crafts tile. The dining room's tiles were made by the Moravian Pottery Works. Originally, the flooring was parquet but has been covered with tongue and groove strip flooring.

The reception room has a beamed ceiling and four chandeliers. The library has built-in Arts and Crafts bookcases and a chandelier that matches those in the reception hall. There is also a kitchen on the first floor.

The north side of the reception hall has Tuscan colums leading to a golden oak staircase with an inglenook fireplace. The inglenook included earth-colored tiles decorated with heraldic beasts, Arts and Crafts light fixtures, golden oak wainscot paneling, and golden oak paneling with the fraternity's Greek letters. The stairs lead to two upper floors and an attic. The second and third floors include ten and eight bedrooms, respectively, study rooms, and bathrooms. The house also has a basement level with a chapter room, bar room, and laundry room.

The chapter house was extensively renovated in the 1950s. It was added to the National Register of Historic Places later in 2001.

== Gallery ==
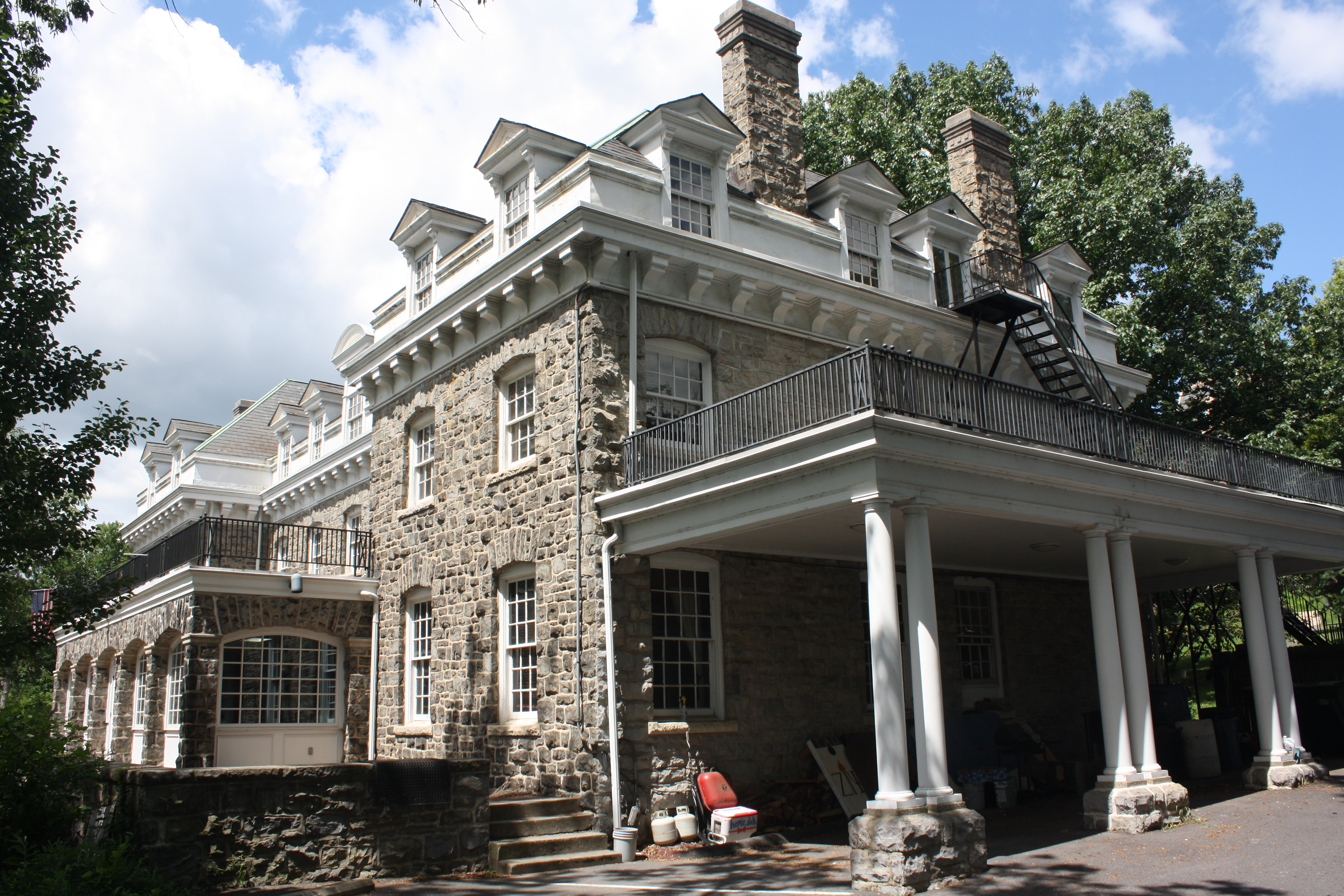

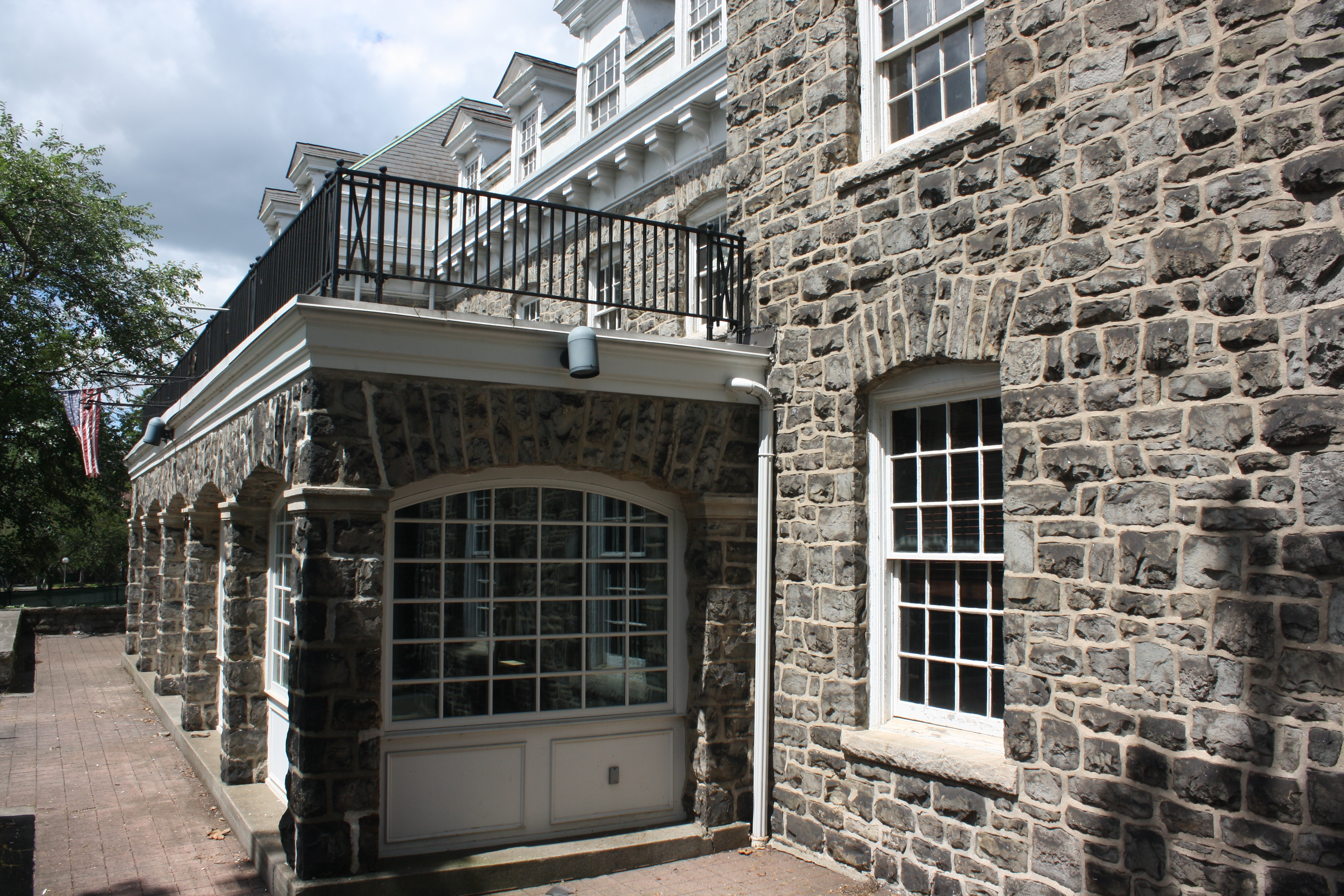

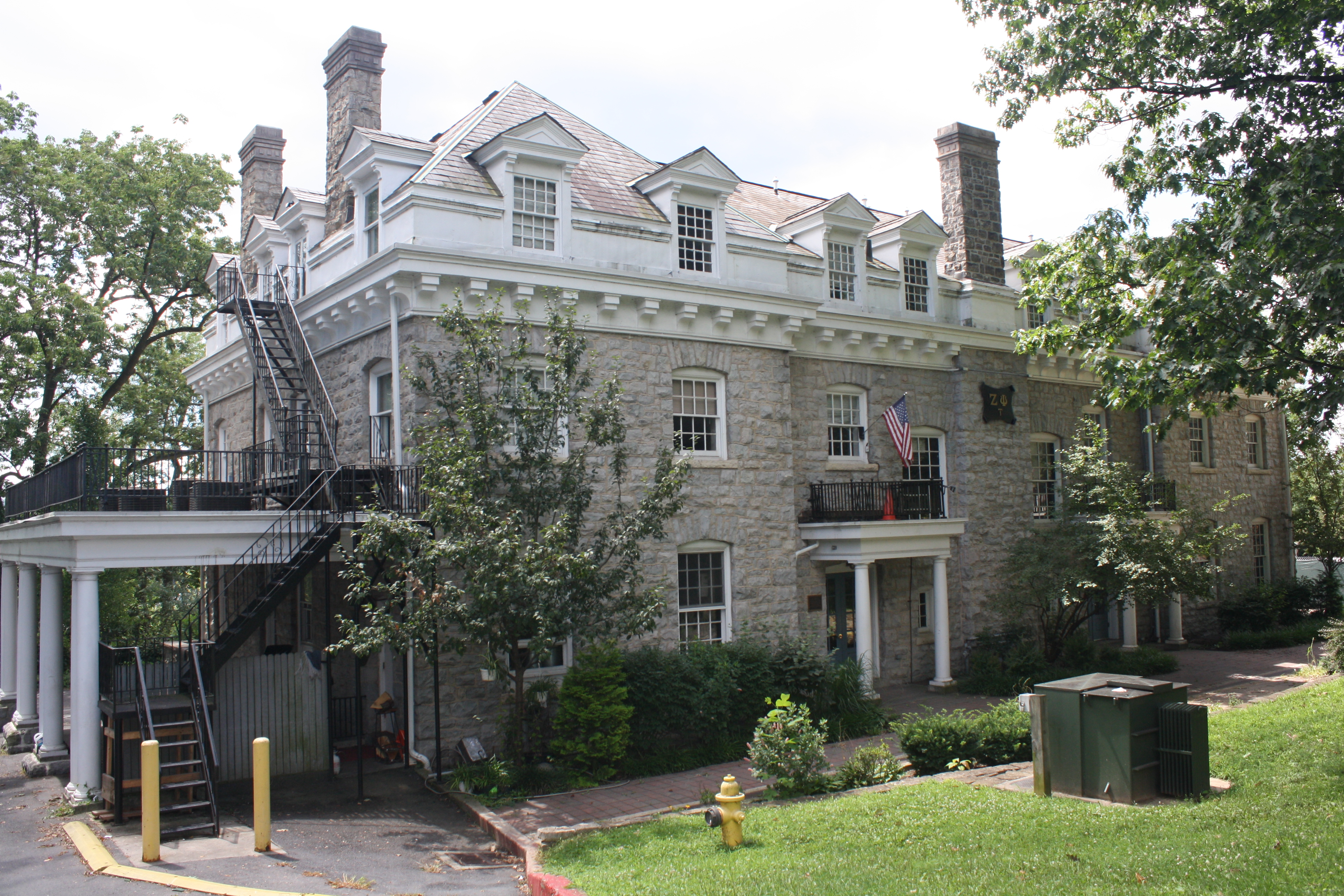

== See also ==
- North American fraternity and sorority housing
