= 2002 in comics =

Notable events of 2002 in comics.

== Events ==
- Chuck Rowles and Steve Rowles begin the webcomic Gods of Arr-Kelaan
- First KomMissia festival held in Moscow.
- Jeroom creates his gag comic Reetman.

=== January ===
- January 29: Zak becomes the first Belgian cartoonist to win the Dutch Inktspotprijs for Best Political Cartoon (edition 2001).

=== March ===
- Adventures of Superman #600: super-sized anniversary issue by Joe Casey, Mike Wieringo, and Jose Marzan, Jr. (DC Comics)
- In Anders And & Co., "Forget It!" by Don Rosa.

=== April ===
- Batman #600: "Bruce Wayne: Fugitive," part one, 64-page giant, written by Ed Brubaker.

=== May ===
- May 4: The first Free Comic Book Day is established. .
- The British satirical cartoon magazine Punch, which had ended in 1992 but briefly revived since 1996, is once again disestablished.

=== June ===
- June 3: Webcomic A Miracle of Science by Jon Kilgannon and Mark Sachs debuts.
- June 14: British comic artist Posy Simmonds is honoured with an Officer in the Order of the British Empire medal.
- After 59 years of continuous serialisation Albert Chartier's comic Onésime comes to an end.
- June 26: Acclaimed best-selling Batman Hush storyline begins in #604 by Jeph Loeb and Jim Lee.

=== July ===
- July 7: The final episode of Peter O'Donnell's Modesty Blaise is published. Its final artist was Dick Giordano.

=== August ===
- August 17: In Santa Rosa, California the Charles M. Schulz Museum and Research Center opens its doors.

=== September ===
- September 14–15: During the Stripdagen in Den Bosch, Eric Schreurs wins the Stripschapprijs. The Teken mijn verhaal foundation wins the P. Hans Frankfurtherprijs.
- Art Spiegelman's graphic novel In The Shadow Of No Towers about the 9/11 terrorist attacks is prepublished in Die Zeit, since no U.S. magazine dares to publish it.

=== November ===
- November 30: In the Belgian Comic Strip Center in Brussels the first Stripvos awards are handed out. Marc Sleen is the first person to receive a statue.
- Time Warner was announced to drop the AOL name.

=== December ===
- December 16: Paul Geerts is knighted in the Order of the Dutch Lion.
- December 31: After 55 years of continuous publication Marc Sleen ends his long-running newspaper comic The Adventures of Nero.

== Deaths ==
=== January ===
- January 10: John Buscema, American comics artist (Silver Surfer) dies at age 74.
- January 13: Pierre Joubert, French illustrator and comics artist (Gribouille, Scout), dies at age 91.
- January 24: Kurt Schaffenberger, American comics artist (continued Captain Marvel and Superman's Girl Friend, Lois Lane), dies at age 81.
- Specific date unknown: Susumu Nemoto, Japanese manga artist (Kuri-chan), dies from heart disease at age 86.

=== February ===
- February 15: Vincenzo Monzi, Italian comics artist (Goldrake, continued Joselito, Tex Willer), dies at age 60.
- February 22: Chuck Jones, American animator, film director and comics artist (Bugs Bunny, Daffy Duck, Wile E. Coyote and the Road Runner, Crawford), dies at age 89.

=== March ===
- March 5: Lucien De Roeck, Belgian graphic designer, painter, illustrator, typographer and comic artist (Klawieter), dies at age 86.
- March 15: Rand Holmes, Canadian underground cartoonist (The Adventures of Harold Hedd), dies at age 60.
- March 16: Paul Schindeler, Dutch comics artist (assistant on Sjef van Oekel), dies at an unknown age.
- March 18: Marcel Denis, Belgian comics writer (Hultrasson) and artist (Les Frères Clips, continued Tif et Tondu), dies at age 79.
- March 24: Ángel Umpierrez, Uruguayan comic artist (Don Cristóbal), dies at age 81.
- March 28: Nicola Del Principe, Italian comics artist (comics for Renato Bianconi, Angelica, Il Camionista, Tom & Jerry comics), dies at age 74.

=== April ===
- April 2: Stanley Pitt, Australian comics artist (Silver Starr, Captain Power, Yarmak, Jungle King), dies at age 77.
- April 4: Camillo Zuffi, Italian comics artist (Il Piccolo Sceriffo), dies at age 89.
- April 11: Jaime Juez Castellà, aka Xirinius, Spanish cartoonist and comic artist (worked on El Jabato, continued Ögan), dies at age 95.
- April 15: Szymon Kobylinski, Polish graphic artist, illustrator, historian, designer and comics artist, dies at age 74.
- April 19:
  - Alberto Beltrán, Mexican comics artist, painter and illustrator, dies at age 79.
  - Jean Albert Carlotti, French painter and comic artist (worked on the La Crime Ne Paie Pas and Les Amours Célèbres series), dies at age 92.
- April 22: Denis McLoughlin, British comics artist (adventure comics for DC Thomson), dies at age 84.
- April 23: Alfredo Pons, Spanish comics writer (Los Amores de Juan Eclipse) and artist, dies at age 44.

=== May ===
- May 3: Tom Sutton, American comics artist (Vampirella) dies at age 65.
- May 6: Ionaldo Cavalcanti, Brazilian painter, comics artist (Crimes que Abalaram São Paulo ("Crimes that shook São Paulo")), and comics scholar (O Mundo dos Quadrinhos, Esses incríveis heróis de papel), dies at age 57 or 59.
- May 7: Robert Kanigher, American comics writer (Wonder Woman, Enemy Ace and most of DC Comics' war comics line), dies at age 86.
- May 15: Arthur Peddy, American comics artist (Phantom Lady, Jann of the Jungle), dies at age 85.
- May 17: Dave Berg, American comics artist (The Lighter Side of...), dies at age 81.

=== June ===
- June 7: Waldyr Igayara de Souza, Brazilian comics artist (Disney comics), dies at age 68.
- June 13: Vincent Fago, American animator and comics artist (Terrytoons comics, continued Peter Rabbit), dies at age 83.
- June 17: Rafael Araiza, El Che, Mexican comics artist (A Batacazo Limpio), dies at age 86.
- June 24: Larry Alcala, Philippine comic artist (Siopawman, Slice of Life, Bim, Bam Bung, Lolo Brigido, Kalabog & Bosyo), dies at age 75.
- June 30: Jaime Brocal Remohí, Spanish comics artist (Katan, Ögan, Kronan, Arcane, Ta-ar), dies at age 66.

=== July ===
- July 8: Ward Kimball, American animator and one of Disney's Nine Old Men, dies at age 88.
- July 11: Jorge Zaffino, Argentine comics artist (worked on Nippur de Lagash and Punisher), dies at age 42 or 43 from a heart attack.
- July 23: Đorđe Lobačev, Russian-Serbian comics artist and illustrator (Gospodar Smrti), dies at age 93.
- July 25: Lucia Pamela, American outsider musician and illustrator (made a colouring book to go along with the narrative of her music album Into Outer Space with Lucia Pamela In The Year 2000), dies at age 98.

=== August ===
- August 2: Kees van Lent, Dutch comics artist (advertising comics for Prins Leo, De Avonturen van het Aapje Joekie), dies at age 82.
- August 5: Grass Green, American comics artist (Xal-Kor the Human Cat, Wildman and Rubberroy), dies at age 63 from lung cancer.
- August 13: Flavio Colin, Brazilian comics artist (Sepé, Vizunga, Mulher-Diaba no rastro de Lampião, O Boi das Aspas de Ouro and Estórias Gerais), dies at age 72.

=== September ===
- September 7: Len Dworkins, American comics artist (assisted on Draftie and Wade Cabot and continued Buck Rogers and Skyroads), dies at age 80.
- September 13: Fred Guardineer, American comics writer and illustrator (Durango Kid, Zatara) dies at age 88.

=== October ===
- October 3: Robert Bagage, A.K.A. Robba, French comic artist and publisher (founder of Éditions Impéria), dies at age 86.
- October 19: Hans Jürgen Press, German illustrator, caricaturist and comics artist (Der Kleine Herr Jakob), dies at age 76.
- October 22: Robert Nixon, British comics artist (Ivy the Terrible, The 12½p Buytonic Boy), dies at age 63.

=== November ===
- November 14: Charles Dupuis, Belgian comics publisher (Dupuis), dies at age 84.
- November 16: Hussein Amin Bicar, Egyptian poet, painter, photographer, philosopher and comic artist (Chaddad & Adouad, made comics for the magazine Sinbad), dies at age 90.
- November 17: Larry Mayer, American comics artist, inker and letterer (Disney comics), dies at age 91.
- November 26: Marco Biassoni, Italian comic artist, illustrator and animator (Lingottino, Prode Anselmo), dies at age 71 or 72.

=== December ===
- December 18: Mic Delinx, Belgian comics artist (La Jungle en Folie), dies at an unknown age.
- December 27: Renzo Restani, Italian comics artist (Dave Devil, Baby Bang, Moses, Yal Brunn), dies at age 74.

=== Specific date unknown ===
- Fieke Asscher, Dutch illustrator, graphic artist and comics artist (De Rare Belevenissen van Professor Stap-door-den-Tijd), dies at age 76.

== Exhibitions and shows ==
- January 22 — February 7: "Heroes Among Us" (New York City Firehouse Museum, New York City) — featuring original artwork from Marvel Comics' Heroes and Alternative Comics' 9-11: Emergency Relief 9/11 benefit books, including creators such as John Romita, Sr., Neal Adams, Alex Ross, Frank Cho, Dean Haspiel, Josh Neufeld, Joe Quesada, Stuart Moore, Renée French, Ted Rall, Tom Hart, Michael Kupperman, Tomer Hanuka, Neil Kleid, Will Eisner, and Nick Bertozzi; later traveled to Wayland Baptist University's Abraham Art Gallery (Plainview, Texas); and Lloyd Center (Portland, Oregon)
- March 7 – May 26: Whitney Biennial, Whitney Museum of American Art (New York City) — features original pages by Chris Ware
- April 25 – June 23: "She Draws Comics: Trina Robbins and 27 Women Cartoonists", Secession Gallery, Vienna, Austria — curated by Trina Robbins; artists include Robbins, Joan Hilty, Lauren Weinstein, Leanne Franson, Fly, Isabella Bannerman, Sharon Rudahl, Lark Pien, Roberta Gregory, Paige Braddock, Molly Kiely, Mary Fleener, Sabrina Jones, Donna Barr, Diane DiMassa, Joyce Chin, Leela Corman, Mary Wilshire, Marie Severin, Sandra Bell-Lundy, Joyce Farmer, Katherine Arnoldi, and Carol Tyler; in 2006, the exhibition toured to the Museum of Comic and Cartoon Art (New York City)

== Conventions ==
- January 19: Big Apple Comic Book Art and Toy Show (St. Paul's Church Auditorium, New York City) — guests include Guy Gilchrist, Ethan Van Sciver, Bill Plympton, Irwin Hasen, Dick Ayers, The Iron Sheik, April Hunter, Wagner Brown, Tammy Lynn Sytch, Chris Candido, and Virgil
- January 19: FLUKE Mini-Comics & Zine Festival (Tasty World, Athens, Georgia) — first iteration of this festival
- February 9–10: Alternative Press Expo (Herbst Pavilion, Fort Mason, San Francisco)
- February 22–24: MegaCon (Orange County Convention Center, Orlando, Florida) — guest of honor: Kevin Smith; other guests: George Pérez, Butch Guice, Mark Waid, Erin Gray, June Lockhart, David Prowse, Michonne Bourriague, Eugene Roddenberry Jr., Bob May, and Mark Rolston
- March: Granada Comics Festival (Granada, Spain) — 7th annual show; controversy as awards are given out in a mock terrorist attack.
- March 9–10: Chicago ComicFest (Rosemont, Illinois)
- March 23–24: Planet Comicon (Kansas City, Kansas)
- April 20: Small Press and Alternative Comics Expo (S.P.A.C.E.) (Ohio Expo Center, Rhodes Center, Columbus, Ohio) — special guests: Dave Sim and Gerhard
- April 19–21: WonderCon (Oakland Convention Center, Oakland, California)
- April 26–28: Pittsburgh Comicon (Pittsburgh Expomart, Monroeville, Pennsylvania) — guests include Carmine Infantino, Billy Tucci, George Pérez, Ted Dibiase, Nikolai Volkoff, Frank Cho, Julius Schwartz, Al Williamson, Kenny Baker, Michonne Bourraigue, and Jerome Blake
- May 5: Alberta Comic Collectors Association Comic & Toy Show (Red & White Club, McMahon Stadium, Alberta, Canada)
- May 11: East Coast Black Age of Comics Convention (Ritter Hall, Walk Auditorium, Temple University, Philadelphia, Pennsylvania) — first annual show; guests include Arvell Jones, William H. Foster, III, Lance Tooks, and Jerry Craft
- May 10–12: Wizard World East (Pennsylvania Convention Center, Philadelphia, Pennsylvania)
- May 17–19: Motor City Comic Con I (Novi Expo Center, Novi, Michigan) — c. 14,000 attendees; guests include Cindy Williams, Frank Cho, Guy Davis, Christopher Golden, Carmine Infantino, Joseph Michael Linsner, Vince Locke, Andy Lee, David W. Mack, Tom Mandrake, Dan Mishkin, Bill Morrison, Mike Okamoto, Scott Rosema, Thomas E. Sniegoski, Brian Stelfreeze, Roy Thomas, S. Clay Wilson, and Randy Zimmerman
- May 18-19: inaugural London MCM Expo
- June: Phoenix Comicon (Ahwatukee, Arizona) — first edition of this show; 432 attendees
- June 1–2: Adventure Con (Knoxville Expo Center, Knoxville, Tennessee) — first iteration of this annual show
- June 1–2: Comics 2002 (The Empire and Commonwealth Museum, Temple Quay, Bristol, Avon, England, U.K.) — presentation of the National Comics Awards; official guests include Joe Quesada, Jamie S. Rich, Grant Morrison, Frank Quitely, John McCrea, William Christensen, Terry Wiley, Woodrow Phoenix, Bevis Musson, Gary Spencer Millidge, Rich Johnston, Patty Jeres, Lee Kennedy, Roger Langridge, James Hodgkins, Heidi MacDonald, Dave Gibbons, Lee Barnett, Mike Conroy, Dez Skinn, Mark Buckingham, Karen Berger, and Jim Valentino
- June 14–16: Heroes Convention (Charlotte Convention Center, Charlotte, North Carolina) — guests include Arthur Adams, Murphy Anderson, Dan Brereton, Nick Cardy, Ron Garney, Butch Guice, Tony Harris, Irwin Hasen, Adam Hughes, Terry Moore, Kevin Nowlan, Carlos Pacheco, George Pérez, Joe Quesada, Julius Schwartz, Brian Stelfreeze, Roy Thomas, Tim Townsend, Charles Vess, and Mike Wieringo
- June 23: MoCCA Festival (Puck Building, New York City) — inaugural MoCCAFest
- June 28–30: New York International Sci-Fi and Fantasy Creators Convention (Madison Square Garden, New York City) — 3rd annual show; guests include George Pérez, Peter David, Chris Claremont, Michael Kaluta, Jae Lee, Kevin Eastman, and Mark Bagley
- July 5–7: Wizard World Chicago (Rosemont Convention Center, Rosemont, Illinois) — guest of honor: Marc Silvestri; special guest: Stan Lee
- July 12–13: Big Apple Comic Book Art and Toy Show (St. Paul's Church Auditorium, New York City) — guests include Michael Berryman, Dennis O'Neil, James O'Barr, Gerard Christopher, Joseph Michael Linsner, Graig Weich, and Virgil
- August 1–4: Comic-Con International (San Diego Convention Center, San Diego, California) — 63,000 attendees; official guests: Dick Ayers, Mike Carey, Howard Chaykin, Peter David, Roman Dirge, Devon Grayson, Frank Jacobs, Chip Kidd, Bub Lubbers, Jason Lutes, Craig McCracken, Todd McFarlane, Tony Millionaire, Kevin Nowlan, Bob Oksner, Lew Sayre Schwartz, Eric Shanower, Hal Sherman, Herb Trimpe, George Woodbridge, and William Woolfolk
- August 17–18: "CAPTION Noir" (Oxford Union Society, Oxford, England)
- August 23–25: Canadian National Expo (Metro Toronto Convention Centre, Toronto, Ontario, Canada) — 16,600 attendees; guests include Brent Spiner, Nicholas Brendon, Nichelle Nichols, John Billingsley, Billy Dee Williams, Andy Hallett, Adam Kubert, Joe Kubert, John Romita Jr., John Cassaday, and Darwyn Cooke
- August 30–September 2: Dragon Con (Hyatt Regency Atlanta/Marriott Marquis, Atlanta, Georgia) — 20,000+ attendees; guests include Carmine Infantino, Nichelle Nichols, and Jefferson Starship
- September 5–8: International Comics and Animation Festival (ICAF) / Small Press Expo (SPX) (Bethesda Holiday Inn, Bethesda, Maryland) — guests include Willem, Los Bros Hernandez, Sabine Witkowski, Art Spiegelman, David Lasky, Johana Rojola, Nick Bertozzi, Greg Cook, Kevin Huizenga, and John Kerschbaum
- September 13–14: Big Apple Comic Book Art and Toy Show (St. Paul's Church Auditorium, New York City) — guests include Jim Steranko, Bill Plympton, Dave Cockrum, Paty Cockrum, Jon B. Cooke, Herb Trimpe, Linda Fite, Gene Colan, Flo Steinberg, Michael Avon Oeming, Dick Ayers, Steve Rude, George Tuska, Neil Vokes, Irwin Hasen, Ray Lago, and John Workman
- October 5–6: FallCon 2002 ( Education Building at the Minnesota State Fairgrounds, Bloomington, Minnesota USA) — sponsored by the Minnesota Comic Book Association
- October 6: Capital Associates Monthly Comic, Toy & CCG Show (Tysons Westpark Hotel, McLean, Virginia USA) — 400 attendees
- October 12–13: Dallas Comic Con & Sci-Fi Expo (Plano Centre, Plano, Texas) — guests include Amanda Conner, Jim Daly, Nick Derington, Richard Dominguez, Ben Dunn, Steve Erwin, Kerry Gammill, Miles Gunter, Michael Lark, Jaime Mendoza, John Lucas, Joseph Michael Linsner, Terry Moore, Mark Murphy, Don Punchatz, Kelsey Shannon, Cal Slayton, Kenneth Smith, and Dave Stevens
- October 15: Los Angeles Comic & SF Con (Shrine Auditorium Expo Center, Los Angeles, California USA)
- October 19–20: Kansas City ComiCon ( Jack Reardon Civic Center, Kansas City, Kansas USA)
- October 18–November 3: FIBDA XIII (Amadora, Portugal)
- October 26–November 3: Lucca Comics & Games (Fair Point, Lucca, Tuscany, Italy) — 50,000 attendees
- October 26–27: Baltimore Comic-Con (Shearton Hotel, Towson, Maryland)
- October 26–27: Motor City Comic Con II (Novi Expo Center, Novi, Michigan) — guests include Richard Herd, James Horan, Michael Edmunds, David Prowse, Shannon Baska, Glori Anne Gilbert, Patrick Bauchau, Jon Gries, and Richard Marcus
- November 8–10: National Comic Book, Art, Toy, and Sci-Fi Expo (Metropolitan Pavilion, New York City) — first annual presentation of the Golden Panel Awards for Excellence in Comic Book Art and Story Telling (from the New York City Comic Book Museum); c. 6,000 attendees; guests include Nichelle Nichols, Sarah Douglas, Sergio Aragonés, Jim Lee, Gene Colan, Nutopia, Sam Kieth, Michael Kaluta, Brian Michael Bendis, David W. Mack, Joe Jusko, Andy Lee, Tim Vigil, and Graig F. Weich
- November 30–December 1: Mid-Ohio Con (Hilton Columbus Hotel at Easton Town Center, Columbus, Ohio)

== First issues by title ==
Cavalcade of Boys
Release: by Poison Press. Writer and Artist: Tim Fish

Festering Season
Release: September by Stickman Graphics. Writer: Kevin Tinsley Artist: Tim Smith 3

Global Frequency
Release: October by Wildstorm. Writer: Warren Ellis Artists: various. Cover by: Brian Wood.

Hawaiian Dick
Release: December by Image Comics. Writer: B. Clay Moore Artist: Steven Griffin.

Point Blank
Release: August by Wildstorm. Writer: Ed Brubaker Artist: Colin Wilson.

The Pro
Release: July by Image Comics. Writer: Garth Ennis Artist: Amanda Conner and Jimmy Palmiotti.

Strange Killings
Release: February by Avatar Press. Writer: Warren Ellis Artist: Mike Wolfer.

Ultimate War
Release: December 8 by Marvel Comics. Writer: Mark Millar Artist: Chris Bachalo.

=== DC Comics ===
- Catwoman

Release January Writer: Ed Brubaker. Artists: Darwyn Cooke and Mike Allred

- Justice League Adventures. Inspired by the animated series.

Release January

- The Power Company

Release February Writer: Kurt Busiek Artist: Tom Grummett.

- Hawkman Spins out of JSA

Release March Writer: Geoff Johns and James Robinson Artists: Rags Morales and Michael Bair

- Fables (Vertigo Comics title)

Release May Writer: Bill Willingham Artists: Lan Medina and Steve Leialoha

- Y: The Last Man (Vertigo Comics title)

Release July Writer: Brian K. Vaughan Artists: Pia Guerra and Jose Marzan Jr.

- Gotham Central

Release December Writer: Ed Brubaker and Greg Rucka Artist: Michael Lark
