= Colin Wilson (comics) =

New Zealand comics artist

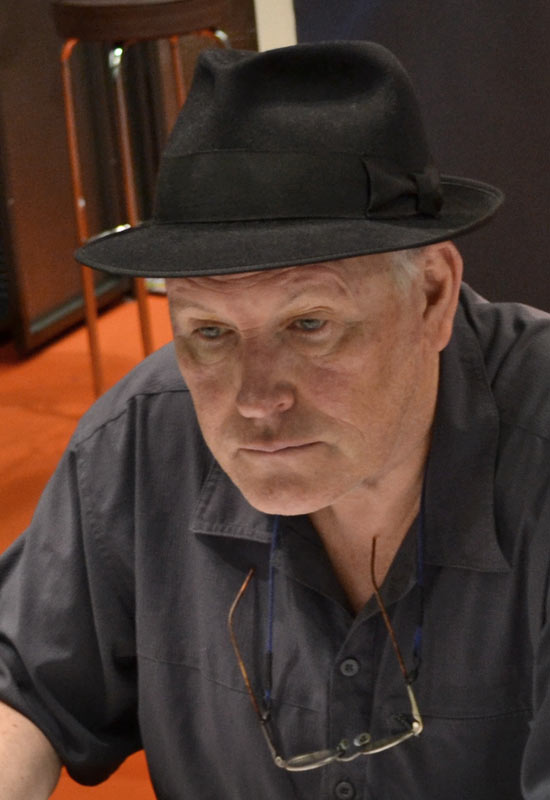
- Colin Wilson (2012)
- Born: 31 October 1949 (age 77) Christchurch, New Zealand
- Area: Artist
- Notable works: Rogue Trooper; Blueberry; Judge Dredd; Star Wars: Invasion
- Awards: 2004: Best Story Prix Saint-Michel
- Spouse: Janet Gale

Colin Wilson (born 31 October 1949) is a New Zealand comic book artist.

He is known for his detailed artwork which he used in 2000 AD stories like Rogue Trooper and Judge Dredd. According to Andy Diggle, the 2000 AD editor who got him back to the title in the late nineties and has worked with him since, "no one ... draws near-future military hardware like him".

Wilson has also had success in the French comics (coined "bande dessinées" – BD – in French) field, working on his own title Dans l'Ombre du Soleil, as well as having a run on the well-established Blueberry series. David Bishop, another 2000 AD editor says that Wilson is "a true rarity, a comics artist whose work has been acclaimed in America, Britain and most especially in Europe."

== Biography ==
Born in Christchurch, Wilson received his formal training as an artist at Christchurch School of Art in 1967–1968. Working as an illustrator, he started his own fanzine, Strips, in 1977. Originally meant as a showcase for Wilson's own comics, Strips soon hosted many New Zealand comics and revived the New Zealand comic scene.

In 1980, he first moved to London and did work for 2000 AD, working on Judge Dredd and Rogue Trooper before moving with his fiancée and later wife Janet Gale on a tourist visa to firstly Amsterdam, the Netherlands in 1982, subsequently to Brussels, Belgium in 1984, before settling a year later for a longer haul in the Provence, France. In Belgium, Gale started out her own comics career as colorist, at first only for the creations of her future husband, but at a later point in time for other (European) comics artists as well.

After he became noticed for the debut "Raël" outing of his first BD science fiction series Dans L'Ombre du Soleil for French publisher Glénat, Wilson was selected to continue the art for the western series La Jeunesse de Blueberry (Young Blueberry) by its original creators Jean-Michel Charlier and Jean Giraud in person. In 1997, the Wilson/Gale couple left France and relocated to Melbourne, Australia, and it was from there that he continued his work for Europe and 2000 AD, took on new commissions for the US comics market, as well as eventually making his Francophone BD market comeback.

Upon his departure from France to Australia, he drew a long story for Italian western comics character Tex Willer, written by Claudio Nizzi and published by Sergio Bonelli Editore in 2000. His later works for the US comics market included Point Blank, written by Ed Brubaker, and Star Wars: Invasion, written by Tom Taylor. The violent and gritty nature of Point Blanc came at a personal cost for Wilson however, as it heralded the end of both his marriage and his two decades old professional partnership with wife and colorist Janet Gale. In 2008, Wilson made a successful comeback on the Francophone BD market when he was contracted by Casterman to provide the art for the mini-series Du Plomb Dans La Tete (written by Matz), and from 2011 onward by publisher Delcourt to do so likewise for several of their series.

On 14 October 2008, Variety reported that his graphic novel Du Plomb Dans La Tete, also known as Headshot, had been acquired by Warner Brothers. It was adapted into the 2012 film Bullet to the Head.

== Bibliography ==
Wilson's Young Blueberry, which marked his breakthrough on the international comic market

=== Comics ===
- The Adventures of Captain Sunshine (with Peter Farrell, Roy Middleton, Reuben Sandler, Helen Cross, Joe Wylie and Jean-luc Bozzoli, 1979)
- Judge Dredd:
  - "The Body Sharks" (with John Wagner/Alan Grant, in 2000 AD #209–215, 1981)
  - "The Numbers Racket" (with John Wagner/Alan Grant, in 2000 AD #218–219, 1981)
  - "Diary of a Mad Citizen" (with John Wagner/Alan Grant, in 2000 AD #229–230, 1981)
  - "The Sweet Taste of Justice" (with Alan Grant, in 2000 AD Sci-Fi Special 1981)
  - The Doomsday Scenario:
    - "War Games" (with John Wagner, in 2000 AD #1158–1159, 1999)
    - "Doomsday" (with John Wagner, in Judge Dredd Megazine #3.56–3.57, 1999)
    - "Volt Face" (with John Wagner/Alan Grant, in 2000 AD #1167, 1999)
    - "Short Circuit" (with John Wagner, in Judge Dredd Megazine #3.61, 2000)
    - "The Cal Legacy" (with John Wagner/Alan Grant, in 2000 AD #1178–1179, 2000)
  - "Relentless" (with Robbie Morrison, in 2000 AD #1237–1239, 2001)
  - "Hellbent" (with Robbie Morrion, in 2000 AD #1242, 2001)
  - "Magic Bullets" (with Al Ewing, in Judge Dredd Megazine #280–281, 2009)
- Tharg's Future Shocks (with Kelvin Gosnell):
  - "Diversion" (in 2000 AD #222, 1981)
  - "Seeing Is Believing" (in 2000 AD #225, 1981)
- Rogue Trooper (with Gerry Finley-Day):
  - "Ascent to Buzzard-Three" (in 2000 AD #236–238, 1981, graphic novel collection "Rogue Trooper, Book One", Titan Books, 64 pages, softcover, September 1985, ISBN 0-9076-1040-4)
  - "Blue Moon" (in 2000 AD #241, 1981, graphic novel collection "Rogue Trooper, Book One")
  - "Fear of the Machine" (in 2000 AD #246–248, 1982, graphic novel collection "Rogue Trooper, Book Two", Titan Books, 64 pages, softcover, March 1986, ISBN 0-9076-1055-2)
  - "The Buzzard" (in 2000 AD #251–253, 1982, graphic novel collection "Rogue Trooper, Book Two")
  - "War of Nerves " (in 2000 AD #258, 1982, graphic novel collection "Rogue Trooper, Book Two")
  - "All Hell on the Dix-I Front" (in 2000 AD #266–271, 275–277, 1982, graphic novel collection "Rogue Trooper, Book Three", Titan Books, 64 pages, softcover, April 1986, ISBN 0-9076-1057-9)
  - "Marauder" (with co-artist Cam Kennedy, in 2000 AD #282–289, 1982, graphic novel collection "Rogue Trooper, Book Four", Titan Books, 64 pages, softcover, August 1986, ISBN 0-9076-1062-5)
- Dans l'Ombre du Soleil (Glénat; In English: Into the Shadow of the Sun, Eclipse Books):
  - 1: "Raël" (script and art, January 1984, ISBN 2-7234-0419-6; English: June 1988, ISBN 0-9130-3584-X)
  - 2; "Mantell" (script and art, July 1986, ISBN 2-7234-0647-4)
  - 3: "Alia" (art, with writer Thierry Smolderen, January 1989, ISBN 2-7234-1014-5)
- La Jeunesse de Blueberry (Young Blueberry) #4–9 (4–6 with Jean-Michel Charlier and 7–9 with François Corteggiani as writers):

Note: Publisher Catalan Communications had advanced plans to release the Wilson Young Blueberry albums in English as well (the first title having already received an ISBN) in their "ComCat" collection, after they had published the first three original ones by series creators Jean Giraud and Jean-Michel Charlier in 1990 (and where the first two Wilson albums were already announced on the back covers), but Catalan's mid-1991 bankruptcy thwarted the intent.
- 4: "Les démons du Missouri" (Novedi, September 1985, ISBN 2-8039-0026-2 – Missouri Demons, ComCat comics, January 1991, ISBN 0-8741-6109-6; cancelled)
- 5: "Terreur sur le Kansas" (Novedi, October 1987, ISBN 2-8039-0046-7 – Terror Over Kansas, ComCat comics, 1991, cancelled)
- 6: "Le raid infernal" (Novedi, March 1990, ISBN 2-8039-0064-5 – The Train from Hell)
- 7: "La pousuite impitoyable" (Novedi, January 1992, ISBN 2-8039-0073-4 – The Merciless Pursuit)
- 8: "Trois hommes pour Atlanta" (Alpen Publishers, June 1993, OCLC 413528824, no first printing ISBN issued – The Three Men from Atlanta)
- 9: "Le prix du sang" (Dargaud, October 1994, ISBN 2-2050-4282-3 – The Price of Blood)

- Thunderhawks (Soleil Productions, with writer François Corteggiani)
  - 1: "Les rangers du ciel" (April 1992, ISBN 2-87764-096-5)
  - 2: "Le fantôme de la Sierra" (October 1994, ISBN 2-87764-262-3, with co-artist Michel Suro)
- Pulp Sci-Fi:
  - "Welcome to the Machine" (with Kek-W, in 2000 AD #1119, 1998)
  - "The Irydian Factor" (with Robbie Morrison, in 2000 AD #1125, 1998)
- Los Angeles (Casterman, October 1999, ISBN 2-203-38936-2 with writer Michel Vandam – oneshot)
- Tex Albo Speciale (Sergio Bonelli Editore, with writer Claudio Nizzi)
  - "L'ultimo ribelle" (Volume 14, 2000, OCLC 982268956 – no first printing ISBN issued)
- Tor Cyan (with John Tomlinson):
  - "World of Hurt" (in 2000 AD #1254–1256, 2001)
  - "The Dead Sorcerer's Coachman" (in 2000 AD #1263, 2001)
- Rain Dogs (with Gordon Rennie, in 2000 AD #1213–1222, 2000; Trade comic album, Venture (=Dark Horse Comics), 52 pages, hardcover, January 2002, ISBN 1-569-71697-8) after a likewise French/German/Dutch release as, where the French edition is concerned, "Temps de chiens" the year previously. (Erko (Slovenian publisher), September 2001, ISBN 9-077-00101-8)
- Point Blank (with Ed Brubaker, Wildstorm, 2002–2003)
  - Issue #1 (August 2002)
  - Issue #2 (September 2002)
  - Issue #3 (October 2002)
  - Issue #4 (November 2002)
  - Issue #5 (December 2002)
    - "Point Blank" (December 2003, ISBN 1-4012-0116-4 – tpb series collection)
- Du plomb dans la tête (aka Headshot) (Casterman, with writer Matz):
  - 1; "Les Petits poissons" (January 2004, ISBN 2-203-39210-X)
  - 2: "Les Gros poissons" (February 2005, ISBN 2-203-39223-1)
  - 3: "Du bordel dans l'aquarium" (January 2006, ISBN 2-203-39232-0)
    - "L'intégrale" (Librairie Grangier, February 2006, ISBN 2-9516404-1-2 – comic album series collection)

Note: Not only has this mini-series seen an English translation as Bullet to the Head by Dynamite Entertainment with each of the three French originals split into two US comic books, but it had also been the basis for the 2012 Silvester Stallone film of similar title as already above-mentioned. The February 2013 reprint of the French intégrale edition (ISBN 978-2-203-06073-9) sported a new cover featuring the countenance of Stallone on its cover.
- Issue #1 (June 2010)
- Issue #2 (July 2010)
- Issue #3 (August 2010)
- Issue #4 (September 2010)
- Issue #5 (October 2010)
- Issue #6 (November 2010)
  - "Bullet to the Head" (February 2011, ISBN 978-1-60690-197-7 – tpb collection)

- The Losers #26–28: "UnAmerica" (with Andy Diggle, Vertigo, 2005)
- Battler Britton (with Garth Ennis, 5-issue mini-series, Wildstorm, 2006, tpb collection, 120 pages, Wildstorm, May 2007, ISBN 1-4012-1378-2, Titan Books, June 2007, ISBN 1-84576-560-5)
- Star Wars:
  - Legacy (with John Ostrander and Jan Duursema):
    - "Trust Issues" (in Legacy #9-10, 2007)
    - "Ready to Die" (in Legacy #13, 2007)
  - Rebellion:
    - "Small Victories" (with Jeremy Barlow, in Rebellion #11–14, 2008, tpb collection, 100 pages, Dark Horse Comics, November 2008, ISBN 978-1-59582-166-9)
  - Invasion (with Tom Taylor):
    - "Refugees" (in Invasion #1–5 and #0, 2009)
- Bionic Commando: Chain of Command (with Andy Diggle, Capcom game tie-in, 2007 eBook, May 2009 comic book)
- The Example (with Tom Taylor, graphic novella, Gestalt Publishing, May 2009, ISBN 0-9775628-4-0)
- Jour J (Delcourt, with writers Fred Duval, Jean-Pierre Pécau and Fred Blanchard)
  - 5: "Qui a tué le président ?" (February 2011, ISBN 978-2-756-01867-6)
  - 10: "Le gang Kennedy" (September 2012, ISBN 978-2-756-02912-2)
- Wonderball (Delcourt, with writers Fred Duval, Jean-Pierre Pécau and Fred Blanchard)
  - 1: "Le chasseur" (September 2014, ISBN 978-2-756-03932-9)
  - 2: "Le fantôme" (April 2015, ISBN 978-2-756-03933-6)
  - 3: "Le shérif" (February 2016, ISBN 978-2-756-06503-8)
  - 4: "Le photographe" (January 2017, ISBN 978-2-756-07239-5)
  - 5: "L'apiculteur" (March 2018, ISBN 978-2-756-07240-1)
    - "L'intégrale" (February 2020, ISBN 978-2-413-01871-1 – comic album series collection)
- XIII Mystery (Dargaud, with writer Frank Giroud)
  - 8: "Martha Shoebridge" (June 2015, ISBN 978-2-505-01976-3)
- Nevada (Delcourt, with writers Fred Duval and Jean-Pierre Pécau)
  - 1: "L'étoile solitaire" (May 2019, ISBN 978-2-413-01059-3)
  - 2: "Route 99" (June 2020, ISBN 978-2-413-02017-2)
  - 3: "Blue Canyon" (June 2021, ISBN 978-2-413-03050-8)
  - 4: "Jack London" (January 2023, ISBN 978-2-413-04195-5)
  - 5: "Viva Las Vegas"" (January 2024. ISBN 978-2-413-07517-2)

With the exception of Los Angeles, all other work Wilson had created for the Francophone BD market, has been released in multiple other languages in Europe as well, beyond French alone. His UK/US work is usually readily available through internet retailers, such as Amazon.

=== Other ===
Apart from his work on comics listed above, Colin Wilson has also done a lot of work as an illustrator, doing covers, illustrations and sketches for many different projects. This also includes work on role-playing games like:

- Mega-City One in Drokk City Prog 2: Mega-City One: Book 2, written by John Caliber, many different co-artists (2005)
- Mega-City One in Drokk City Prog 3: The Justice Department, written by John Caliber, many different co-artists (2006)
- Mega-City One in Drokk City Prog 4: Future Crime, written by John Caliber, many different co-artists (2005)

== Awards ==
- 2004 – won Best Story, Prix Saint-Michel, for Du plomb dans la tête

== Sources ==
- Ernst, Dominique (January 1987). "Dossier Wilson: Entretien avec Colin Wilson et Janet Gale". Bonté Divine! (in French). No. 8. Thônex: Dominique Ernst. pp. 5–25.
- Molcher, Michael (November 2015). 2000 AD: The Creator Interviews, Volume Four – Chapter 5: Colin Wilson (eBook ed.). Oxford: Rebellion Publishing Ltd. p. 109. ISBN 9781849979863.
