= Festering Season =

2002 graphic novel by Kevin Tinsley

Publication information
- Publisher: Stickman Graphics
- Format: graphic novel
- Publication date: September 2002
- Main character(s): Renee DuBoise; Paul Whythe; Isabelle Desanto

Creative team
- Created by: Kevin Tinsley
- Written by: Kevin Tinsley
- Artist: Tim Smith 3
- Colorist: Kevin Tinsley

Collected editions
- Softcover: ISBN 0-9675423-2-4
- Hardcover: ISBN 0-9675423-1-6

The Festering Season is a graphic novel created by Kevin Tinsley with artist Tim Smith 3. It was published as a first-run graphic novel by Stickman Graphics in 2002.

== Plot ==
After the owner of an East Village botanicas is killed in a bizarre police shooting, her daughter, Rene Duboise is summoned back to New York from Haiti, interrupting her Vodou training. Upon her return, Rene realizes that she is being watched and that there is something more sinister going on in the city.

At the same time, Paul Whythe, a cultural anthropology professor at New York University is asked to consult with the NYPD’s Cult Related Task Force on dead body unearthed in Brooklyn Heights. He recognizes the ritualized nature of the burial to be related to the religion of Palo, but becomes suspicious of the East Village shooting’s relationship with the similar religion of Vodou.

Rene realizes that a drug smuggler by the name of Gangleos is behind a series of ritualistic crimes, including her mother’s death, after a confrontation with Isabelle Desanto, whose brother had also been murdered after seeking counsel with Rene’s mother. After a meeting with Paul shortly thereafter, Rene is able to piece together a far greater threat being orchestrated against the entire city. However the extent and purpose of which remain a mystery until near the end of the story.

== Influences ==
The Festering Season is an extremely polemical story that is particularly critical of the Giuliani administration and highly politicized police procedures that were implemented during his tenure in office. It was described “no light read,” “highly original” and “socially conscious” in reviews and even received an extensive write up in The New York Times.

In the afterword of the graphic novel, Tinsley cites numerous incidents and news reports on police brutality, racial profiling, weakened constitutional rights and Vodou curses that influenced and inspired his story. There are footnotes throughout the afterword that reference numerous Village Voice articles and an article from the New York Post that was emblazoned with a front-page headline that read: Black Magic Woman.

== Art Style ==
Tim Smith’s art is heavily influenced by Japanese Manga, but is reproduced from his original pencils, occasionally appearing rough, and revealing sketchy construction lines. Photographic backgrounds of actual locations are used often throughout the book to varying degrees of success.

The coloring is notable in that utilizes a two-color printing process that was originally used during the early 1900s. Tinsley stated in an interview that The Festering Season was begun using a grayscale palette, but that he felt it was lacking impact. At this time he “remembered an old art history lesson about Norman Rockwell’s” early work on the Saturday Evening Post which was reproduced in two-color. Tinsley has gone on to use this same process on subsequent graphic novels.
