= Stonehaven (comics) =

Series of graphic novels

- Official Stonehaven logo.

Publication information
- Publisher: Stickman Graphics
- Format: graphic novel
- Publication date: 2004-current
- Main character: ensemble cast

Creative team
- Created by: Kevin Tinsley
- Written by: Kevin Tinsley
- Artist(s): Phil Singer; Kevin Tinsley
- Colorist: Kevin Tinsley

Stonehaven is a series of first-run graphic novels and prose novels set in a contemporary urban fantasy city of the same name, in which mythical creatures live openly alongside humans. Created by Kevin Tinsley in the ‘90s, the first volume was published by Stickman Graphics in 2004.

== Setting ==
Stonehaven is a series of graphic novels and prose novels set in a contemporary urban fantasy city of the same name, in which mythical creatures live openly alongside humans. The individual stories tend to be multi-genre (crime thrillers, adventure, mystery) within this fantasy environment and use a rotating ensemble cast of characters.

The series takes place in a world that is geologically identical to Earth, consisting of the same continents and land masses, but with an alternative history that is significantly different from reality. The city of Stonehaven is geographically and structurally similar to New York City. Politically, Stonehaven is a city-state that covers a large area comparable to New York state, Connecticut, Rhode Island, large sections of Pennsylvania and Massachusetts. The stories to date have focused on the metropolitan area.

The alternative history of this world is that of a diverse pagan society in which magic and mythical creatures, such as elves, ogres and dwarves, have always existed openly alongside humans. As a result, they are treated as common-place and almost mundane within the contemporary environment. However, their existence has had a significant impact on political and scientific advancements. The most notably covered so far has been the stymieing of ‘secular’ medicine in the wake of politically powerful pagan faith healing.

== Themes ==
Kevin Tinsley, the creator of the Stonehaven series, minored in Philosophy and Religious Studies while in college. These studies appear to heavily influence the themes and stories behind the series.

The central philosophical foundation of the series is that of existentialism, a definition of which appears at the beginning of Fruit of the Poisonous Vine. More specifically, the series as a whole focuses on the existential debate that asks "Is man defined by his nature, or does his nature define the man?” Some characters appear strictly confined to their character types and unable to break out of their mold, while others at times can, at times, act contrary to their personalities. However, despite their internal conflicts, most characters are on some level depicted as everyday sentients (within the fantasy realm) struggling to make do in a universe over which they have little control.

There are also several religious themes involving paganism, gnosticism, pantheism and free will in a world where miracles and faith healers are commonplace. In Fruit of the Poisonous Vine, a form of Christianity was introduced that is loosely based on the fractured state of the first-century church. Without a strong leader such as the Emperor Constantine, the church continues to fracture into a multitude of divergent beliefs. Some are familiar while others are unrecognizable.

== Characters ==
Akkab ben Ashkenazim is a human of middle-eastern descent born and raised in the mean streets of Stonehaven. More the scrapping street tough, than a military fighter, he is employed by Dwarkin Extermination Company. He had attended college, but was ejected when his political and philosophical stances and demonstrations were deemed too disruptive. He is a philosophical anarchist (though not a violent one), and has quite a police record as a result. It was revealed in Fruit of the Poisonous Vine, that Akkab was raised in an Ebionite family. These beliefs appear to be similar to those of Pauline Bethesda (his neighbor), but view the founder of her order as a heretic.

Charles Cortez is a human solicitor for Capulous Industries. He is a weaselly little sociopath who has displayed uncompromising cutthroat tactics in his unrelenting quest to climb the corporate ladder as swiftly as possible. He is an underhanded, backstabbing, manipulative liar capable of fabricating a plausible cover story at the drop of a hat. Simply put, he is a despicable little miscreant whom Capulous would not hesitate to flush down the drain if the need arose. And Cortez is too full of his own self-importance to ever see it coming.

Detective Sergeant Dahvide Engals is an investigator on the City Guard's Gang Related Task Force. Although Dahvide's abrasive attitude had not won him any friends among the higher-ranking officials in the City Guard, his keen attention to details that others overlooked and his ability to tie those details into a cohesive whole, made him an indispensable asset to the task force.

Detective Inspector Sterling Fairmont is the world-weary head of the City Guard's Gang Related Task Force.

Dutch is a human fighter in the employ of Dwarkin Extermination Company. At one time he was career military, with a promising future in special ops. He was discharged shortly after a classified mission in a foreign country, which resulted in the loss of most of his men. Whatever happened was highly traumatic, leaving Dutch as a stereotypical post-traumatic burn out. He apparently has no real social life outside of work, to which he commits himself 110%. He is the stoic, emotionless, strong silent type, and is very good at his job.

Dwarkin Extermination Company goes after all forms of pests and vermin. From rats and termites, to poltergeists, trolls and a variety of other unusual life-forms. They usual send out teams of three: A magic-user, a cleric, and someone with hand-to-hand and weapons training (a fighter). This usual covers all potential pests.

Eryn Lewellyn is a human cleric of the Carpocratian order who works for Dwarkin Exterminators. There appears to be a serious conflict between the Carpocratian order and the Yeshuan sect of Pauline Bethesda.

Greywinder is a dwarven magic-user in the employ of Dwarkin Exterminators. He is crotchety and overly opinionated, and feels right at home in underground tight spaces.

Kashlueque is the ancient elven valet/personal assistant/confidant to Vincent Capulous. Kashlueque is deeply involved in Capulous criminal activities, and is particularly sinister in his own right.

Manchester Lane is one of the most high-profile—and expensive—defense attorneys on the continent. He has represented Capulous Industries on occasion.

Marjen (affectionately referred to as “Mother” or “Mother Jones”) is a cleric. She appears to be second in command at Dwarkin Extermination Company, if not in fact, then from the respect and guidance the others look towards her.

Meggan Eisner is a media major at Stonehaven University. She works for Victor Jardine on a freelance basis utilizing her considerable photography and computer skills performing video surveillance and hacking databases.

Meili Mau, pronounced may•lay MOW, her name means ‘graceful cat’. She is a Chinese mob enforcer and loan shark. As a high-ranking member (but certainly not a leader of) an organized crime syndicate, she does some very nasty and evil things, including killing people. Despite this, there are times when she will do what is right as opposed to what is expected.

Nheserteri (Teri) Solistara Rieca is a full-blooded wood elf, who studies magic at the Stonehaven University of Thaumaturgy and Theological Studies. She is a fair student with average grades. Several advanced magic-users and clerics recognize a strong natural talent for magic in Teri, leading them to believe she could be a potentially powerful sorcerer. Unfortunately, Teri is not as motivated in her studies as her advisors would hope. She is more interested in socializing and enjoying herself. She relies far too much on using her looks and personalities to get by. As result, she is overly preoccupied with how other people perceive her and her actions; which, over time leads her down a course of constants lies and deceit in order to save face. After losing a scholarship due to poor grades, she was forced to take a job at Dwarkin Exterminators in order to pay her tuition.

Noble Ironhorse is the name given to a vigilante by the news media. He first appeared in Fruit of the Poisonous Vine when he slaughtered a group of Eastern European mobsters. However, for some unknown reason, he spared the mob's leader. His name derives from the fact that there appeared to be some sort nobility crest was painted on the old Ironhorse motorcycle he was riding. At this time his race and identity are unknown.

Pauline Grace Bethesda is a Hispanic young woman who is a member of a Yesuan religious order, referred to as Paulites, that is evangelically monotheistic. This sect is considered to be a cult by the majority of the pantheistic society of Stonehaven, and alienates itself even farther by preaching against the use of magic of any kind. She is a neighbor of Akkab ben Ashkenazim, who came to her aid when she was accosted by mobsters in Fruit of the Poisonous Vine. She attracted the attention of these mobsters, and Vincent Capulous, when she helped organize a protest against Divinity Medical Center. During the story a prophecy was made that she would be a catalyst in revealing “the treachery of Capulous and his allies.”

Plotinus is the villain of the Subterranean Hearts. A magic-user and cleric who had spent years wallowing in his own self-pity and mediocrity, which helped to form massive delusions of grandeur in regards to his place in the ‘grand scheme of nature.’ He accidentally formed some sort of artificial group consciousness with a large population of trolls living in the underground infrastructure of the city. He is also a cannibal of sorts, and possibly a sexual offender. During the course of the story, Plotinus prophesied that on two different occasions in the future, both Dutch and Teri would "bring chaos and destruction" to the city.

Priya Kika is a Felidae cleric at the Abbey of Brighid Belenus, and the night supervisor at Divinity Medical Center's immediate care unit. She is stern, but well respected due to her excellent reputation as a healer. Kika bears similar markings to a Siamese cat.

Rodya Svyatoslav is a Reptilian magic student working an internship at Divinity Medical Center. It is rare to see a Reptilian pursuing a career in magic, but Rodya is indeed talented. Quirky, inquisitive and somewhat spastic at times, she is very enjoyable to be around.

Sarasvati (Sara) Maitreyi is a Desi immigrant to Stonehaven, and a resident at Divinity Medical Center. The chance to study xenobiology, practice inter-species medicine, as well as witness magical therapies and thaumaturgical healing firsthand was nothing less than a dream come true. However her position became precarious after numerous run-ins with head administrator. She is currently involved with surgical resident, Dr. Vonali Aleantylar.

Splinter is Victor Jardine's cousin, and appears to be pre-pubescent child. Although Victor is probably older than her, they are in actuality close to the same age (if not maturity level). Considering elves age more slowly than humans, they may have been children together at some point. This may explain their odd interaction and relationship. Splinter particularly annoys Victor by referring to him as her uncle. Splinter appears to be an orphan, and street urchin, and probably a thief. She is extremely dexterous, nimble and acrobatic. Not to mention a fearless bundle of energy.

Tylar (Dr. Vonali Aleantylar) is a surgical resident at Divinity Medical Center. However, Tylar has a secret agenda. Despite being a secular doctor, Tylar comes from a family of tradition thaumaturgical healers—the Aleantylar Clan or Noble House of Healers. Generations of his ancestors devoted themselves to the healing arts. But he now hides that he too has such abilities. Apparently, sent out into the world in a "clandestine search for mystery.” He is currently romantically involved with fellow resident Dr. Sarasvati Maitreyi.

Victor Jardine is a half-elf private investigator. A classic rogue of a character, but hardly a gentleman. The life of a private investigator is far from glamorous considering one makes his living following people for suspicious spouses, seeking compromising secrets for divorce cases, and occasionally trying to find missing persons. In short, they are usually not well liked because they make their living invading other peoples privacy, or profit from their misery and tragedies. Jardine is thick skinned, callously honest in his opinions, and doesn't really care what other people think of him. He tends to be a womanizer, and has an eye for Asian women in particular. Despite his many and varied faults, he is a man of integrity, and although his morals are sometimes questionable, he does strive to be one of the good guys.

Vincent Capulous is the CEO of an international business conglomerate with ties to a secret organization known as the Parliament. Capulous’ family has played a major role in the development of the city of Stonehaven. He appears to be a major protagonists of the series associated with a number of criminal enterprises.

The Zirk are a quasi elven tribe inhabiting the north woods section of Centre Park. They are made up of cross-ethnic elven outcasts, most have some Drow in their background (which is the main reason for their being outcast).

== Creatures and Races ==
The term race is used within the Stonehaven series to refer to different sentient species such as elves, dwarves and humans. Ethnicity is used to describe physical and cultural varieties within a race. Sentients is the politically correct term used in place of general terms such as humans or people.

Mythical races that have appeared in Stonehaven include elves, dwarves, ogres, centaurs, cyclops, and two anthropomorphic animal races: the reptilians and the felidae (a feline race). Belicosians are an ethnic variety of reptilians that are more aggressive, with large plate like scales. The more common reptilians have smaller snake-like scales.

Although not a race unto themselves, werewolves (or lycanthropes) have a significant role in Stonehaven. However, they are not the mindless animals that only come out during the full-moon. However, society as a whole fears and ostracizes them, and as group they face much prejudice. This leads to and usually leads to werewolves sticking to their own, and forming packs. Werewolves themselves are not loners, but form strong bonds to groups, gangs, and clicks. The most notorious being the gang called the Wild Pack. However, if a normal group of friends (or a gang) accepts them, they are quite loyal and will not feel an overwhelming need to seek other werewolves.

Vampires, on the other hand, are the stuff of legend. They are a cross between UFO Conspiracies, and the Mafia. There is no proof that they actually exist, and if they ever did they are probably extinct. That doesn't stop people believing in them. They are still the boogie man one scares their children with, and there are hundreds of books and TV specials about 'Vampire sightings' (just like UFOs and flying saucers). Of course, the wackier adherents tend to be religious fanatics or Goth types wanting to become creatures of the night. But, most intellectual right minded people (including the government and medical communities) cannot stress enough that vampires do not exist. However, at the end of Fruit of the Poisonous Vine it is implied that they do exist, and that they strive to keep their presence a secret. Nothing has yet been revealed about vampires, other than their connection to a mysterious group known as the Parliament.

Other mythical animals that have appeared in Stonehaven include griffins and trolls. Trolls are sub-human creatures who are (arguably) non-sentient. However, in Subterranean Hearts, the evil sorcerer Plotinas accidentally created a hive mind with a group of sewer dwelling trolls.

== Volumes ==
Softcover to Milk Cartons and Dog Biscuits

Milk Cartons and Dog Biscuits

graphic novel
Released: 2004
softcover ISBN 0-9675423-4-0
hardcover ISBN 0-9675423-3-2

Milk Cartons and Dog Biscuits is an introduction of the city through the eyes of Dan Parsons, a State Ranger (the equivalent of a marshal or state police trooper) from a rural area known as the Far Reaches, who travels to the city in search of his runaway daughter, Melody. Receiving no assistance from the Municipal Guard (the city police), he hires a disreputable half-elf private detective, named Victor Jardine, to help in his search. Their investigation brings them in conflict with the Chinese mob Meili Mau and a renegade werewolf, while introducing a number of recurring characters and institutions. The artist, Phil Singer, was nominated for the 2004 Russ Manning Most Promising Newcomer Award for his work on this book.

Softcover to Subterranean Hearts

Subterranean Hearts

graphic novel
Released: 2006
softcover ISBN 0-9675423-6-7
hardcover ISBN 0-9675423-5-9

Subterranean Hearts, the second book in the series, is about an Elven magic student attending Stonehaven University who must take a summer job at Dwarkin Extermination Company in order to pay her tuition. This company employs magic-users, clerics and ex-military types in order to deal with more fantastical pests. An intersecting storyline involves Victor Jardine and mob enforcer Meili Mau coming into conflict over a mentally disturbed teenager. The story culminates with all parties fighting for their lives against trolls in the city's sewer system.

Softcover to Fruit of the Poisonous Vine

Fruit of the Poisonous Vine

prose novel
Released: 2008
ISBN 978-0-9675423-7-9

Fruit of the Poisonous Vine is his crime drama focuses on a police investigation of the murder of a barrister in possession of illegal blood donations. This book focuses on several secondary characters from previous titles, as well as introducing several new protagonists to the series, including the head of a multi-international corporation named Vincent Capulous. A central theme of this story focuses on the effect that magic and pagan faith healing has had on the medical profession.

== Reviews ==
- Tales of the City. by Bill Baker, Bakers Dozen, posted March 3, 2004

http://www.worldfamouscomics.com/bakersdozen/back20040303.shtml

- Magic and Crime in the City. by Kai-Ming Cha, PW Comics Week, posted August 8, 2006;

http://www.publishersweekly.com/article/CA6360366.html?nid=2789

- Snap Judgments. by Randy Lander, The Fourth Rail. http://www.thefourthrail.com/reviews/snapjudgments/030104/stonehavenmilkcartonsanddogbiscuits.shtml
- Critiques on Infinite Earths. by Don MacPherson, The Fourth Rail. http://www.thefourthrail.com/reviews/critiques/030104/stonehaven.shtml
- Stonehaven:Subterranean Hearts. by Lance Eaton, Curled Up with a Good Book. http://www.curledup.com/subheart.htm
- Reviews listed on publisher's website at http://www.stickmangraphics.com/reviewdb.htm
