= Star Wars: Invasion =

- Invasion logo Cover Art by Wes Dzioba

Publication information
- Publisher: Dark Horse Comics
- Format: Ongoing series
- Genre: science fiction
- Publication date: May 2009 – November 2011
- No. of issues: 16

Creative team
- Created by: Tom Taylor (writer); Colin Wilson (illustrator); Wes Dzioba (colorist)

Star Wars: Invasion was an American comic book series set in the Star Wars universe. The series, published by Dark Horse Comics, was written by Tom Taylor, and illustrated by Colin Wilson with color by Wes Dzioba. Like another ongoing series by Dark Horse—Star Wars: Legacy—it included various ties to the novels by Del Rey, while still remaining accessible to new readers. It launched with two online-only preview issues on Starwars.com in May–June 2009. The first printed issue was published on July 1, 2009.

Published by Dark Horse Comics, the series was set in the New Jedi Order era and depict the events of the Yuuzhan Vong War.

In January 2010, Star Wars: Invasion #0 was nominated for a 'Diamond Gem Award' in the '2009 Comic Book of the Year Over $3.00' category.

== Synopsis ==
The first arc was called Refugees, a 5-issue series with a prologue in issue #0.

The second arc was called Rescues, a 6-issue series.

The third and final arc was called Revelations and is a 5-issue series.

== Issues ==
- Invasion #0: Refugees, Prologue (Color 40 Pages, Oct 2009)
- Invasion #1: Refugees, Part 1 of 5 (Color 40 Pages, Jul 2009)
- Invasion #2: Refugees, Part 2 of 5 (Color 40 Pages, Aug 2009)
- Invasion #3: Refugees, Part 3 of 5 (Color 40 Pages, Sep 2009)
- Invasion #4: Refugees, Part 4 of 5 (Color 40 Pages, Oct 2009)
- Invasion #5: Refugees, Part 5 of 5 (Color 40 Pages, Nov 2009)
- Invasion #6: Rescues, Part 1 of 6 (Color 40 Pages, May 2010)
- Invasion #7: Rescues, Part 2 of 6 (Color 40 Pages, Jun 2010)
- Invasion #8: Rescues, Part 3 of 6 (Color 40 Pages, Jul 2010)
- Invasion #9: Rescues, Part 4 of 6 (Color 40 Pages, Sep 2010)
- Invasion #10: Rescues, Part 5 of 6 (Color 40 Pages, Oct 2010)
- Invasion #11: Rescues, Part 6 of 6 (Color 40 Pages, Dec 2010)
- Invasion #12: Revelations, Part 1 of 5 (Color 40 Pages, Jul 2011)
- Invasion #13: Revelations, Part 2 of 5 (Color 32 Pages, Aug 2011)
- Invasion #14: Revelations, Part 3 of 5 (Color 32 Pages, Sep 2011)
- Invasion #15: Revelations, Part 4 of 5 (Color 32 Pages, Oct 2011)
- Invasion #16: Revelations, Part 5 of 5 (Color 32 Pages, Nov 2011)

== Trade paperbacks ==
- Volume 1: Refugees (collects Star Wars: Invasion #0–5, 144 pages, April 2012, ISBN 1-59582-479-0)
- Volume 2: Rescues (collects Star Wars: Invasion – Rescues #1–6, 144 pages, April 2011, ISBN 1-59582-630-0)
- Volume 3: Revelations (collects Star Wars: Invasion – Revelations #1–5, 128 pages, April 2012, ISBN 1-59582-882-6)
