= Point Blank (comics) =

- Point Blank #1

Publication information
- Publisher: DC Comics / Wildstorm
- Schedule: Monthly
- Format: Limited series
- Genre: , crime, superhero
- Publication date: August - December 2002
- No. of issues: 5
- Main character(s): Grifter; Holden Carver; John Lynch; Tao

Creative team
- Written by: Ed Brubaker
- Penciller: Colin Wilson

Collected editions
- Point Blank: ISBN 1-4012-0116-4

Point Blank is a five-issue comic book limited series written by Ed Brubaker with art by Colin Wilson. It was published by Wildstorm comics.

It starred Grifter from the Wildcats investigating an attempted murder on his friend John Lynch.

== Plot ==
Cole Cash also known as Grifter is supposed to meet up with his friend John Lynch in a bar. Both were soldiers in Team 7 and despite their differences over the years, they still trust each other. He then finds out that Lynch has been shot and is in a coma.

Cole decides to avenge Lynch and find out who killed him. His investigation leads to Tao, a former member and enemy of Grifter's team the Wildcats. Grifter is contacted by Holden Carver, a member of Tao's organisation, who turns out to be a sleeper agent. Lynch is the only one who knows about Carver's status as an agent and Carver hopes that Grifter can help him now Lynch is in a coma.

Grifter promises to bring in Carver, but returning to his room, he finds Tao. Tao tells Grifter that he had been under Tao's influence and that in fact Grifter himself was the one who shot Lynch. Tao then erases all memory of the past few days from Grifter's mind. Grifter returns to the bar to wait for Lynch, leaving Carver within Tao's organisation with no hope of extraction.

== Sequel ==
The story continues in the series Sleeper.

== See also ==
- Team 7

== Collected editions ==
The series was collected into a trade paperback:

- Point Blank (5-issue limited series, tpb, 128 pages, December 2003, ISBN 1-4012-0116-4)
