= FallCon =

Board game convention in Calgary, Canada

- Status: Active
- Genre: Board Game Convention
- Date: August 21 - 23, 2026
- Frequency: Annual
- Venue: TELUS Convention Centre
- Locations: Calgary, Alberta
- Country: Canada
- Years active: 39
- Inaugurated: 1987
- Most recent: August 22 - 24, 2025
- Attendance: 800 in 2025
- Organizer: FallCon Gaming Society
- Filing status: Non-profit
- Website: http://www.FallCon.com/

FallCon is a boardgame convention in Calgary, Alberta featuring a broad range of modern boardgames and miniatures. During the three day convention, attendees can learn new games by signing up for hosted events or check-out a game from the library in the open gaming area (volunteers are available to make game recommendations or to help with rules / finding other players). The family friendly event also features a live board game auction Saturday night, prototype alley to playtest new games, and Exhibitor booths to browse. In 2026, FallCon 39 will be hosted August 21-23 at the TELUS Convention Centre.

Calgary has a strong boardgame community, which the Calgary Herald credits to events like FallCon and game store The Sentry Box . The convention is managed by a Board of Directors, an organizing committee and a ConCrew, who all volunteer to manage registration, the game library, and teach boardgames to the general public.

The event started as a group of wargamers putting up their own money to rent the hall for the weekend and play games with a few of their friends. in 2010 FallCon had approximately 400 attendees, and has expanded 5–10% per year since. In 2015 FallCon has an extensive 1400+ boardgame library listed on boardgamegeek.com under the user name DBezzant. FallCon holds a 400 used game auction that only takes 2hrs to complete on the Saturday evening of the event.

2015 FallCon announced some changes to the line-up of their event, including a giant version of King of Tokyo. The online signup for hosted games has been reduced to only the select few staples of FallCon: 12 Man Titan, Formula De, Roborally and Circus Maximus. Several game show type events has also been added, including Wheel of Fortune, Wits & Wagers and Things in a Box, and a Family Game Zone has been added.

FallCon 365 is a directive managed by the FallCon Gaming Society to expand the Boardgame community to the general public. This directive hosts several online and in-person gaming events each month. These events a generally held at local game stores, Co-Op grocery store community rooms, or online at Board Game Arena. Meetup Hosts bring games from their own library and/or FallCons' library for others to play at the events. These smaller events usually have 20–60 attendees with 35 on average. The FallCon External Events team is also called upon several times in a year to host boardgame events at other large conventions in Calgary. At GameCon Canada 2023, FallCon hosted a large open board gaming area with many volunteers in attendance to share our love of board games. FallCon also hosts the board game room at the annual Otafest convention where they have on hand many Anime Themed boardgames for the Anime Convention. Geekmoot 2015 had a dozen or more volunteers give their time to run the boardgame room. In 2013, Comic Expos' boardgame room was run by FallCon Volunteers.

The winner of the Canadian Game of the Year Awards (CGDA) is announced at the annual FallCon convention. The Game of the year awards are managed by the directors of FallCon and the Game Artisans of Canada are one of the primary supplier of new prototypes to this award. Each year the award winner receives a hand crafted wooden plaque with the CGDA logo on it, and a monetary sum.
