= Kevin Tinsley =

American comics creator and publisher

- Born: Kevin Tinsley Richmond, Virginia
- Areas: Publisher, Colourist
- Notable works: Digital Prepress for Comic Books; The Festering Season; Stonehaven

Kevin "Stickman" Tinsley is an American comics creator and publisher.

== Early life ==
Kevin Tinsley, also known as Stickman, was born in Richmond, Virginia. He attended Virginia Commonwealth University, where he acquired a Bachelor of Arts degree in Painting and Printmaking with minors in Art History, as well as Philosophy and Religious Studies. Afterwards, he attended the Joe Kubert School of Cartoon and Graphic Art in Dover, New Jersey from which he graduated in 1989.

== Career ==
Tinsley began working for Marvel Comics in 1990, initially doing art corrections as one of Romita’s Raiders, before moving into the production department, colloquially known as the Bullpen. Tinsley rose to the position of Senior Cover Coordinator where he oversaw the production workflow of cover mechanicals. Between 1994 and 1996, Marvel made a transition from all analogue hand-pasted mechanicals to a company-wide digital workflow. During this time, Tinsley was assigned the task of spearheading this transition within the production department, where he trained personnel and developed new production and prepress techniques unique to the comic industry.

He left staff in 1996 to focus on his career as a freelance comic-book colorist, which he had begun several years earlier as the regular colorist on such titles as Spider-Man and Punisher: War Zone. He also wrote the how-to book Digital Prepress for Comic Books, which he published in November 1999 under the imprint Stickman Graphics. The sales of this book provided the financial foundation on which Tinsley began publishing his own first-run graphic novels, including The Festering Season and the Stonehaven series.

In December 2001, Marvel Comics asked all colorists to submit bids for coloring work so that it could lower its production costs, leading Tinsley to sever his freelance ties with the company.

Tinsley has continued his career in prepress and production in the publishing and advertising industries, while creating and publishing his own books for Stickman Graphics.

== Publications ==
- Digital Prepress for Comic Books: The Definitive Desktop Production Guide (1999, ISBN 0-9675423-0-8)
- The Festering Season (2002, ISBN 0-9675423-2-4)
- Stonehaven: Milk Cartons & Dog Biscuits (2004, ISBN 0-9675423-4-0)
- Stonehaven: Subterranean Hearts (2006, ISBN 0-9675423-6-7)
- Stonehaven: Fruit of the Poisonous Vine (2008, ISBN 978-0-9675423-7-9)
