= Lucien De Roeck =

Belgian artist and typographer

- De Roeck in 1984
- Born: March 9, 1915; Dendermonde, Belgium
- Died: March 5, 2002 (aged 86); Elsene, Belgium
- Occupation: Graphic designer
- Known for: Expo 58

Lucien Theodore De Roeck (9 March 1915 – 5 March 2002) was a Belgian artist, type designer, typographer and graphic designer. He is best known for the design of Expo 58, the Brussels World's Fair in 1958.

== Early life and interests ==
Lucien De Roeck was born in Dendermonde. When he was 5, the family moved to Ixelles/Elsene, a municipality of Brussels. De Roeck was born to draw. From his earliest memories on he remembered himself drawing. He always had a sketchbook and a pencil on hand. For the rest of his life, De Roeck drew at least 10 minutes every day. All of his sketches and drawings have been captured in over 400 sketchbooks.

Dendermonde is situated next to the river the Scheldt. From a very young age until his death he was fascinated by the stream and had a special connection with it. He spent a lot of his time watching and drawing the boats on the Scheldt. The port of Antwerp, located next to the Scheldt, was a great subject of his drawings as well.

When De Roeck was 15, he started being more serious about drawing. The place where you could find him drawing the most was on the tram on his way to school where he documented the passengers. At that time, he decided to take evening classes in drawing.

== Education ==
At the age of 17, in 1932, De Roeck enrolled in La Cambre which is a notorious art school in Brussels. They had a very modernist way of teaching inspired by Bauhaus. His teachers of the evening classes had a liberal approach. This made De Roeck opt for the rather socialist and progressive La Cambre, unlike his traditional Flemish education in high school.

De Roeck had a strong affinity for architecture, but due to limited financial possibilities he chose to study the shorter program Advertising Design. This separate program was exclusive at La Cambre, it wasn't taught at Bauhaus. He had the atelier Advertising Design by Joris Minne. Nand Geersen instructed the course Book Design. He graduated with great honors in 1935 and thought this grade was too high, which showed his great modesty.

The modernist mind-set of La Cambre was brought by Henry van de Velde, the headmaster at that time. He set the example for De Roeck. Van de Velde taught him to simplify the complexity of a subject by reducing and erasing redundant elements and only keeping the essential. De Roeck lived by this idea of a versatile synthesis guided by a clear opinion.

Keeping your curiosity was also taught by van de Velde and the knowledge and mind-set De Roeck learned in La Cambre, he would later transfer to his future students. As well as the idea that learning is endeavoring, editing and critically reviewing.

After serving his military service in 1935 he took an extra year to experiment with typography at La Cambre as well.

In 1939 De Roeck decided to take a course in calligraphy at the London Royal College of Art. This ended abruptly. He was called for duty in May 1940 to fight the Battle of the Lys.

== Career ==
In 1935, De Roeck and his fellow students were asked by the mayor of Antwerp Camille Huysmans to design a poster which would serve as an advertisement for Antwerp. For sketching he went back to his beloved Scheldt to draw the small boats and huge ships. The iconography and composition of the final poster had influences from A.M Cassandre and Leo Marfurt. De Roeck won the assignment and over 10.000 copies were made. There was a second edition in 1936. After, a second design brief was assigned to the class. This time it was to promote the ferry connection Ostend-Dover. De Roeck wonoas the best design for this assignment.

In 1941 there was a lawsuit in which De Roeck was accused of the illicit use of the font Peignot designed by Cassandre in his poster for an international dance contest. This incident made Lucien focus more on the specialization of letter shapes. He had already developed a strong affinity for type design in the 1930s. Specialization would guarantee De Roeck security and avoid future similar incidents.

The first big assignment he had after his studies and military service, was in 1937 by Yves Denis, the director of the Centre for Fine Arts in Brussels. De Roeck was asked to do the lay-out of their newspaper they published every month, the Journal des Beaux-Arts.

In 1941 De Roeck pursued teaching which turned out to be his second nature after drawing. He started teaching typography at La Cambre. Later in Ecole des Filles de Marie (later Sint-Lucas paviljoen and now Karel de Grote-Hogeschool) in Antwerp, the provincial college in Saint-Ghislain and evening schools and Brussels as well. It wasn't until 1980 that De Roeck decided to retire. After his retirement he spent an extra year at La Cambre to do an unpaid internship in teaching. Students of his are amongst others Pierre Alechinsky, Michel Olyff and Jean-Michel Folon.

De Roeck became in 1946 a staff member of the Book Museum in Brussels. He organized exhibitions about typography and book printing. In 1969 he became a member of ATypI and in 1958 he took part for the first time in the L’association des Rencontres internationales de Lure.

=== Wartime ===
During the Battle of the Lys, De Roeck kept an autobiographical sketchbook. He fought back with drawings. These are a series of cubist drawings with elements such as soldiers, airplanes and explosions which summed up what he had experienced. Afterwards he was taken to a German detention camp and was freed end 1940.

As much as he wanted to make a name for his himself after he graduated, the circumstances weren't good. Because of the war, designing wasn't always possible. This was a major setback for the beginning career of De Roeck. He had to earn money as a house painter. When he had a commission, usually for posters, the design was frugal. He used simple typography and little color. He would also design infographics for the Belgian newspapers with information on the movements of the Allied armies.

Paper was scares during wartime, which forced De Roeck to take other surfaces to draw on. He had to settle for smaller pieces of paper, a piece of tablecloth or found cardboard. All of this was still enough to satisfy his craving for drawing.

=== Freedom of the press ===
After the Second World War ended, the press got its freedom back. This resulted in the flourishing of the Belgian press. From 1944 De Roeck designed for La Lanterne. He provided a revival of Le Phare with his talents as typographer and illustrator and launched their new Sunday magazine. He also designed for La Cité and Le Quotidian. For the paper Pan he reviewed theatre plays in images. The narration would adapt to the overall feel of the plays. In 1950, De Roeck also drew a short-lived newspaper comic strip, Klawieter.

=== Expo 58 ===
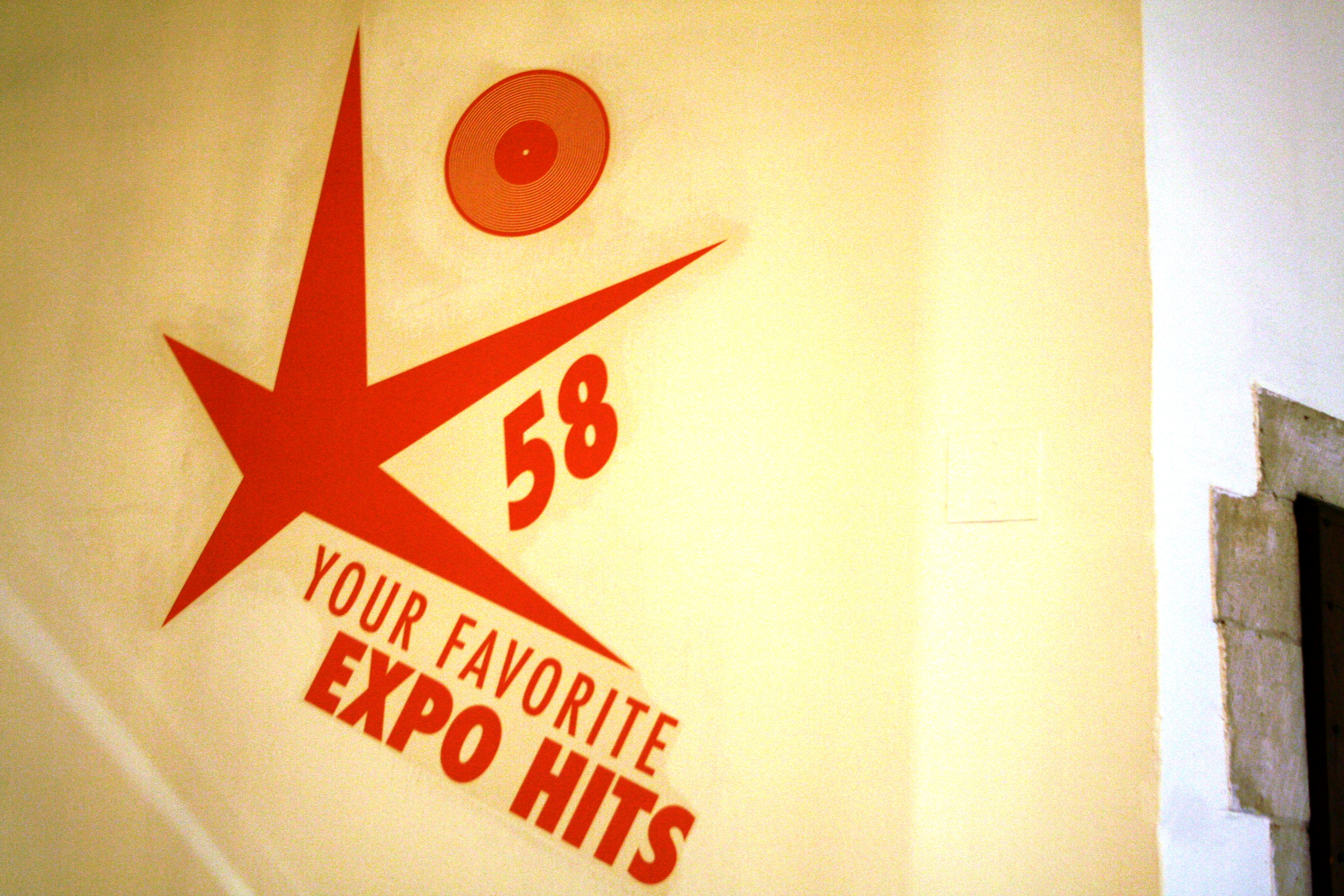
Expo 58

De Roeck experienced the peak of his career during the 1950s. In 1954 he won the design competition for the poster of the World Fair of 1958. He used an asymmetrical star in the center of the design, combined with a globe in the right upper corner. The star has the city hall of Brussels in the middle. The five points stand for the visitors of the 5 continents Brussels would welcome, as well as the number of decennia Congo was a colony of Belgium. The typography exists of ‘Brussels’ and ‘58’ and the colors used are blue and green which suggest heaven and earth.

In the expo itself, De Roeck enlarged the star and built luminescent 3D versions, used to decorate a footbridge with a view over several pavilions.

De Roeck received in 1960 an honorary badge as knight for the realization and success of Expo 58 from the Order of Leopold II. In 1966 he got one from the Order of Leopold.

=== After the 1950s ===
In the 1960s the International Typographic Style advanced and from 1980 the digital revolution took off. This all didn't have much grip on De Roeck. He renewed himself but remained true to his own style.

== Work process and aesthetics ==
At the start of designing a poster, the sketching phase was the most important. De Roeck developed an idea which was sometimes better than the final product. He occasionally complained to his students that when he showed designs to his clients, they would have remarks on the composition or color. They often wanted details from one sketch combined with another and this led to half-hearted design, he said.

For his earliest posters, created in the thirties, he used the diagonal axis of view, typical for the idiom of that time. He also created a dynamic rhythm between text and image. He pleaded for a direct approach, a clear transmission of language on a subject that looked simple at first sight. In order to reach this, the only way was to analyze the basic elements that gave the outcome the most suitable look. The function determined the form, but he combined this with elegance. He never got rid of these ideas.

Because De Roeck had a great fondness for architecture, he worked with high precision. This was convenient when designing plans, decors and scale models. De Roeck worked in 1959 on a mobile panorama sight of Brussels in perspective and relief, commissioned by the Commissariat of Tourism. He painted large pieces of fabric with the images of Brussels buildings.

== Personal life ==
Lucien De Roeck married in 1941 to Adrienne van Emden. She studied at La Cambre as well and had a degree in weaving. His daughter Anne and his son Michel were born in 1944 and 1945. As a family they moved a few times, but stayed within the city of Elsene.

As an homage to his children he would sometimes use their names as his pseudonym. Under the pseudonym Luc Doek, De Roeck made a comic named Jef Klawieter. Later, influenced by Jijé, who he met in La Cambre, he drew Gibou. But soon after de Roeck realized that comic books aren't something for him, he had a more spontaneous way of sketching and drawing.

He was friends with other comic artists Hergé, Edgar P. Jacobs and André Franquin and made intimate portraits of them. He had the rare ability of capturing the fleeting of a model. Sometimes he wouldn't even lift his pencil from the paper. For New Year's he sent them greeting cards decorated with lyrical typography.

At his death the Fonds Lucien De Roeck was created as an archive of his work.
