= Stickman Graphics =

American publisher

- Type: Private Company
- Genre: Graphic novels
- Founded: Brooklyn, NY, USA (1989)
- Founder: Kevin Tinsley
- Headquarters: Brooklyn, NY, United States
- Website: stickmangraphics.com

Stickman Graphics is an American publisher of graphic novels, prose fiction and how-to books. The company is currently located in the Borough of Brooklyn in New York City.

== Company history ==
Stickman Graphics was founded by Kevin Tinsley as a graphic arts production studio servicing the publishing and comic book industries. As a result of an extensive period assisting in the digital transition of Marvel Comics’ production department, Tinsley published Digital Prepress for Comic Books in 1999.

After the initial success of this timely how-to book, Stickman Graphics transitioned into a publishing business model, and began publishing first-run graphic novel titles. In 2008, it attempted to broaden its market base by releasing an urban-fantasy prose novel called Fruit of the Poisonous Vine, based upon its Stonehaven series of graphic novels.

== Publications ==
Softcover to Digital Prepress for Comic Books

Digital Prepress for Comic Books

How-to/self-publishing
Released: 1999
softcover ISBN 0-9675423-0-8

Digital Prepress for Comic Books was published in November 1999. This professional level how-to book has a narrow focus on pre-production techniques geared specifically for printing comic artwork on an offset press. The basics of digital coloring and lettering are covered with an emphasis on trapping given the necessity of performing such production techniques simultaneously with the creative process of computer coloring and lettering.

Hardcover to The Festering Season

The Festering Season

graphic novel
Released: 2002
softcover ISBN 0-9675423-2-4
hardcover ISBN 0-9675423-1-6

The Festering Season is a graphic novel published in 2002. This graphic novel is a supernatural-mystery about the daughter of a Vodou priestess in New York City as she investigates the murder of her mother. The story is highly polemical and particularly critical of the Giuliani administration. It received positive write ups in the media, including the New York Times and Publishers Weekly.

Stonehaven is a series of graphic novels and prose novels set in a contemporary urban fantasy city of the same name, in which mythical creatures live openly alongside humans. The individual stories tend to be multi-genre (crime thrillers, adventure, mystery) within this fantasy environment and use a rotating ensemble cast of characters.

Milk Cartons and Dog Biscuits

graphic novel
Released: 2004
softcover ISBN 0-9675423-4-0
hardcover ISBN 0-9675423-3-2

The first book in the series, Milk Cartons and Dog Biscuits (graphic novel, 2004), is an introduction of the city through the eyes of an outsider. It follows a State Ranger (the equivalent of a marshal or state police trooper) from a rural area who travels to the city in search of his runaway daughter. Receiving no assistance from the Municipal Guard (the city police), he hires a disreputable half-elf private detective, named Victor Jardine, to help in his search. Their investigation brings them in conflict with the Chinese mob and a renegade werewolf, while introducing a number of recurring characters and institutions.

Subterranean Hearts

graphic novel
Released: 2006
softcover ISBN 0-9675423-6-7
hardcover ISBN 0-9675423-5-9

Subterranean Hearts, the second book in the series (graphic novel, 2006), is about an elven magic student attending Stonehaven University who must take a summer job at an extermination company in order to pay her tuition. This company employs magic-users, clerics and ex-military in order to deal with more fantastical pests. An intersecting storyline involves Victor Jardine and mob enforcer Meili Mau (also introduced in first book) coming into conflict over a mentally disturbed teenager. The story culminates with all parties fighting for their lives against trolls in the city’s sewer system.

Fruit of the Poisonous Vine

prose novel
Released: 2008
ISBN 978-0-9675423-7-9

The third book in the series, Fruit of the Poisonous Vine, is a prose novel (2008). This crime drama focuses on a police investigation of the murder of a barrister in possession of illegal blood donations. This book focuses on several secondary characters from previous titles, as well as introducing several new protagonists to the series. A central theme of the story focuses on the effect of magic and pagan faith healing has had on the medical profession.
