= Roy Middleton =

Australian cricketer (1889–1975)

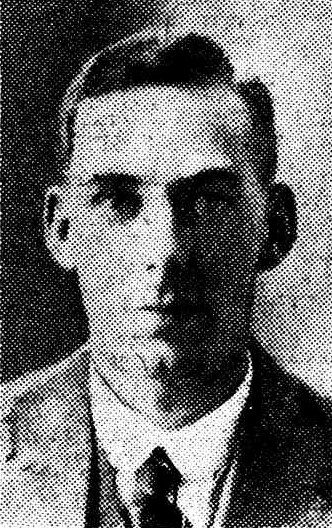

Personal information
- Full name: Roy Foster Middleton
- Born: 18 September 1889; Kent Town, South Australia, Australia
- Died: 19 March 1975 (aged 85); Adelaide, Australia
- Batting: Right-handed
- Role: Batsman/Administrator

Domestic team information
- Years: Team
- 1912/13–1914/15: South Australia

Career statistics
Competition	First-class
Matches	5
Runs scored	151
Batting average	16.77
100s/50s	–/–
Top score	34
Balls bowled	–
Wickets	–
Bowling average	–
5 wickets in innings	–
10 wickets in match	–
Best bowling	–
Catches/stumpings	1/–
- Source: Cricinfo, 11 September 2011

Roy Foster Middleton (18 September 1889 – 19 March 1975) was a former first-class cricketer and administrator, serving as chairman of the Australian Cricket Board of Control.

Born in Kent Town, South Australia, Middleton made his first-class debut on 28 February 1913 for South Australia against Victoria at the Adelaide Oval. Batting at number seven, Middleton scored 20 and 14 as South Australia won by 166 runs.

Middleton's highest score of 34 was made as an opener in the match against Victoria at Adelaide Oval starting 13 February 1914 and his final match, also against Victoria, was the final first-class match in Australia before first-class cricket was suspended due to World War I. Although his first-class statistics were average, Middleton was a leading player in Adelaide district cricket, once scoring an unbeaten 201 for East Torrens Cricket Club against Glenelg Cricket Club during the 1912/13 season, and his 770 runs for the 1914 season was the record aggregate for any batsman in the South Australian district competition since it was established in 1897.

Following the war, Middleton worked in investments management, becoming manager of the Executive Trustee and Agency Co. in Adelaide, and became involved in cricket administration, initially with his club side East Torrens, where he became secretary. In 1926 he was elected South Australian Cricket Association treasurer, a position he held until 1949, appointed to the Grounds and Finance Committee and became a member of the Australian Cricket Board of Control. In 1929 Middleton further consolidated his role as a senior figure in South Australian cricket when he was made chairman of SACAs Cricket Committee. In these roles, Middleton was forced to deal with problems related to the onset of the Great Depression, including a significant drop in SACA income and requests for aid by former players in financial difficulties (such as Ernie Jones). Additionally, he was involved in the recruitment to South Australia of leading players, such as Don Bradman and Jack Badcock.

Following the death of SACA President Harry Blinman on 23 July 1950, Middleton, who was vice-president, was elected to the position of president, a position he would hold until September 1965.

Middleton was appointed chairman of the Australian Cricket Board of Control on 18 September 1952, the first in 25 years to have played first-class cricket. He served as chairman for one three-year term, retaining his SACA positions. Outside of cricket, Middleton was a leading figure in Adelaide society, serving as President of the influential Commonwealth Club.

In 1962, Middleton was awarded honorary life membership of the Marylebone Cricket Club (MCC) in appreciation "of the high service rendered to the game." Throughout the 1960s, there had been a growing push for cricket to be played on Sundays, a move staunchly opposed by the conservative Middleton. By September 1965, with the majority of SACA members in favour of play on Sunday, Middleton decided to retire from the presidency, although he continued to remain active in the association.

Middleton died in Adelaide in 1975, aged 85.
