= List of music magazines =

This is an alphabetical listing of notable printed and online music magazines.

== 0–9 ==
- 1000°
- 2wice
- 7ball

== A ==
- Ablaze!
- The Absolute Sound
- Absolutely Zippo
- Acoustic
- Acoustic Guitar
- Addicted to Noise
- Afisha
- Allgemeine musikalische Zeitung
- AllHipHop
- Alternative Addiction
- Alternative Press
- Alternative Ulster
- AltSounds
- The Amazing Pudding
- American Record Guide
- American Songwriter
- AMP
- Aquarium Drunkard
- Are You Scared To Get Happy?
- Art Nouveau
- Artcore Fanzine
- Arthur
- Artrocker
- Asbri
- The Attic
- Audio
- Audio Arts
- Australian Musician

== B ==
- Bachtrack
- BAM
- Bananafish
- Banjo Newsletter
- Bass Frontiers
- Bass Guitar
- Bass Musician
- Bass Player
- Bass Quarterly
- Bayreuther Blätter
- BBC Music Magazine
- Beat
- Beat Instrumental
- BeatRoute
- Beats Per Minute
- The Believer
- Beyond Race
- Big Cheese
- The Big Takeover
- Billboard
- Billboard China
- Billboard Greece
- Billboard Indonesia
- Billboard Japan
- Billboard Philippines
- Billboard Radio Monitor
- Billboard Vietnam
- Black Market
- Black Music
- Black Velvet
- Blender
- Blistering
- Blitz
- Block Magazine
- Blow Up
- Bluegrass Unlimited
- Blues & Rhythm
- Blues & Soul
- Blues Matters!
- Blues News
- Blues Unlimited
- Blunt
- Blurt (formerly Harp)
- bma
- BMG
- BPM
- Boston Rock
- Brave Words & Bloody Knuckles
- Bravo
- Bristol in Stereo
- British Bandsman
- British Bluegrass News
- Broadside
- BrooklynVegan
- Brum Beat
- Bucketfull of Brains
- Buddy
- Burrn!
- Buscadero
- Bwletin Cymdeithas Emynau Cymru

== C ==
- Cadence
- Canadian Musician
- Canadian Review of Music and Art
- Careless Talk Costs Lives (also known as Careless Talk or CTCL)
- Cashbox
- CCM
- CD Review (also known as Digital Audio and Digital Audio and Compact Disc Review)
- Chainsaw
- Chart Attack
- Cheetah
- Chicago Innerview
- Chief Magazine
- Christian Music Planet
- Chronicles of Chaos
- Chunklet
- Circus
- City Fun
- Clash
- Classic FM
- Classic Rock
- Classica
- Classical Music
- Classic Pop
- Classical Recordings Quarterly (formerly Classic Record Collector)
- Club Fonograma
- CMJ New Music Monthly
- Coda
- Colorado Music Buzz
- Comes with a Smile
- Cometbus
- Complete Music Update (formerly College Music Update)
- Complex
- Computer Music
- Consequence
- Country Music
- Country Music News
- Country Standard Time
- Crack
- Crawdaddy
- Creem
- The Cricket
- Cronicl y Cerddor
- Cross Rhythms
- Cure
- CyberPsychos AOD
- Cyclic Defrost
- Cymbiosis

== D ==
- Damage
- Dance Music Authority (DMA)
- Dance Music Report (formerly Disco News, later DMR)
- Dancing Astronaut
- Death to the World
- De:Bug
- Decibel
- Deep Water Acres
- The Deli
- denim delinquent
- Diapason
- Digital Music News
- Dirty Linen
- Disc
- Disco 45
- Discografia Internazionale
- DIY
- DJ Magazine (or DJ Mag)
- Dork
- Double Dance
- DownBeat
- Drowned in Sound
- Drum!
- Drum Media
- Dwight's Journal of Music
- Džuboks

== E ==
- Ear
- Ear for Music
- Echoes (formerly Black Echoes)
- Ego Trip
- Electronic Beats
- Electronic Cottage
- Electronic Musician
- Elmore Magazine
- Enderrock
- ENZK
- The Etude
- Exclaim!
- Experimental Musical Instruments

== F ==
- Fabulous 208
- The Face
- FACT
- The Fader
- Fanfare
- Fast Folk (formerly The CooP)
- Fast Forward
- Film Score Monthly
- Filter
- Flexipop
- Flipside (formerly Los Angeles Flip Side)
- Flux
- Fluxblog
- The Fly
- FMQB
- Foggy Notions
- Foley
- Folk Den
- Folk Review
- Folker
- Forced Exposure
- Foxy Digitalis
- Freak Out!
- FRET
- Fretboard Journal
- Frontpage
- fRoots (formerly Folk Roots)
- Furia Musical
- Fused
- Fusion
- FutureClaw
- Future Music

== G ==
- Gaffa
- Gasoline
- Gavin Report
- Gigwise
- Global Rhythm
- Go-Set
- God Is in the TV
- Goldberg Magazine
- GoldenPlec
- Goldmine
- Gonzo (circus)
- Gorilla vs. Bear
- Gothic Beauty
- Graffiti
- Gramophone
- Greed Magazine
- Grooves
- Le Guide musical
- Guitar for the Practicing Musician
- Guitar Player
- Guitar World
- Guitarist

== H ==
- Halftime Magazine
- Hard Metal
- Harmonica World
- The Harmonicon
- Harp
- hartbeat!
- Has It Leaked
- Heroina
- Hey
- Hi-Fi News & Record Review
- High Fidelity
- High Voltage
- Hip Hop Connection
- Hip Hop Weekly
- Hip Hop World
- HipHopDX
- Hipster Runoff
- Hit Music
- Hit Parader
- Hits
- The History of Rock
- HM
- Homocore
- Hot Press
- Hot Wacks
- Hugi
- huH
- HUMO
- Hype

== I ==
- IAJRC Journal
- Impose
- In Tune Monthly
- Indiepost
- Indie Hoy
- Industrialnation
- Innerloop
- Les Inrockuptibles
- Inpress
- The Instrumentalist
- International Musician and Recording World
- International Record Review
- International Times
- Invisible Oranges
- Irish Music
- It's Psychedelic Baby!
- IZM

== J ==
- Jazz & Pop
- Jazz at Ronnie Scott's
- Jazz Forum (British)
- Jazz Forum (Polish)
- Jazz Hot
- Jazz Improv
- Jazz Journal
- Jazz Magazine
- Jazz Review
- The Jazz Review
- Jazzenzo
- Jazzman
- JazzTimes
- JazzWeek
- Jazzwise
- J.D.s
- Jefferson Blues Magazine
- Jockey Slut
- Journal of Music
- Juice (American)
- Juice
- Juice (German)
- Juke Blues
- Juke Magazine

== K ==
- Kerrang!
- Keyboard
- Kill Your Pet Puppy
- Kingsize Magazine
- Kludge
- KRLA Beat
- Krugozor
- KtmROCKS

== L ==
- L.A. Record
- La Lettre du musicien
- Le Monde de la musique
- Latin Beat Magazine
- laut.de
- Let It Rock
- Limelight
- The Line of Best Fit
- Livewire
- Living Blues
- The Living Tradition
- London in Stereo
- Lords of Rock
- Loud and Quiet
- Louder Than War
- Loudwire

== M ==
- M Music & Musicians (M)
- M8 (now Tilllate)
- Machina
- Madhouse
- Magic
- The Magical Music Box (or The Music Box)
- Magnet
- Making Music
- Matter
- The Maud Powell Signature, Women in Music (or Signature)
- Maximum Rocknroll (MRR)
- Melodic
- Melodie und Rhythmus
- Melody Maker
- Le Ménestrel
- Mersey Beat
- Metal
- Metal.de
- Metal Edge
- Metal Forces
- Metal Hammer
- Metal Maniacs
- Metal Rules
- Metal Storm
- Metronome
- The Mississippi Rag
- Mix
- Mixmag
- Modern Drummer
- Mojo
- Mondo Sonoro
- More
- movmnt
- MP3
- Music Connection
- Music Express
- Music Feeds
- Music Industry Online
- The Music
- The Music Network
- The Music Scene (or La Scena Musicale)
- The Music Trades
- Music Week
- Music Y
- Musica e dischi
- Musica Jazz
- Música Nueva
- Musica sacra
- Musical America
- Musical Courier
- The Musical Leader
- Musical Opinion
- Musician
- MusicRow
- Musics
- Musicworks
- Die Musik
- Musikexpress
- Musikmarkt
- MusikWoche
- Musik und Gesellschaft
- Muzik

== N ==
- Country Weekly
- Nation19
- The Native
- The Nerve
- Neue Berliner Musikzeitung
- Neue Musikzeitung
- Neue Zeitschrift für Musik
- New Music Weekly
- New Musical Express (NME)
- New Noise Magazine
- New York Rocker
- NewMusicBox
- Next Magazine
- Nightshift
- Nine-O-One Network
- No Depression
- Nothing but Hope and Passion (NBHAP)
- Notion
- Number One
- Nuovo Canzoniere Italiano

== O ==
- OffBeat
- Okej
- OOR
- OP Magazine
- Opera
- Opera Canada
- Opera News
- Opernwelt
- Option
- Opus
- Das Orchester
- Organ
- The Organ
- Orkus
- Orpheus – Oper und mehr
- Österreichische Musikzeitschrift
- Outburn
- Oxford American
- Ozone

== P ==
- PA Music Scene
- Painkiller
- Paper
- Parterre Box
- Paste
- People's Songs
- Perfect Sound Forever
- Performer
- Permission
- Peroxide
- Phlow
- Phonograph Record
- Phonograph Monthly Review
- Pigeons & Planes
- Pitchfork
- The Pitchfork Review
- Pizzicato
- Plan B
- Planet Sound
- Pollstar
- Pop & Rock
- Pop Culture Press
- Pop Express
- The Pop Manifesto
- PopMatters
- PORK
- The Positives
- Pound
- Powerline
- Profane Existence
- Prog
- Ptolemaic Terrascope
- Pulp
- Pulse!
- Punk
- Punk Globe
- Punk Planet
- Punk Rock Confidential

== Q ==
- Q
- The Quietus

== R ==
- R2
- R&B Showcase
- R&R
- Radio & Records
- The Ragtime Ephemeralist

Rap Pages

- Rap-Up
- Rated R&B
- Rave
- Raw
- The Raw Report DVD-Magazine
- Ray Gun
- Razorcake
- Reax
- The Record
- Record Collector
- Record Mirror
- The Record
- Record Retailer
- Record World
- Redefine
- (RED)Wire
- Reggae Report
- Release Magazine
- Relix
- Remix
- RēR Quarterly
- resident
- Resident Advisor
- RESPECT.
- Revolver
- Revue et gazette musicale de Paris
- La Revue musicale
- Rhythm
- Rhythmer
- Rhythms
- Riff Raff
- Rip It Up (Australian)
- Rip It Up (New Zealand)
- Ritam (1960s)
- Ritam (1980s–90s)
- Roadrunner
- Rock
- ROCKRGRL
- Rock & Folk
- Rock-A-Rolla
- Rock and Roll Popular 1
- Rock Australia Magazine (RAM)
- Rock Express
- Rock Hard
- Rock N Roll Experience
- Rock on Request
- Rock Sound
- Rock Street Journal (RSJ)
- Rockdelux
- Rockerilla
- The Rocket
- Rockin'On Japan
- Rolling Stone
- Rolling Stone Africa
- Rolling Stone (Australia)
- Rolling Thunder
- Ronnie Scott's Jazz Farrago
- RPM
- RWD

== S ==
- Salut les copains (later Salut!)
- Sandman
- SCENE
- Schweizer Musikzeitung
- Scratch
- Screamer
- The Second Line
- Select
- Sentimentalist (formerly The Sentimentalist)
- SFX Cassette Magazine
- Shindig!
- Shook
- Shoxx
- Side Stage
- Signale für die musikalische Welt
- Sing Out!
- The Skinny
- Skyscraper
- Slagwerkkrant
- Slant Magazine
- Slash
- Slug and Lettuce
- Sluggo!
- Smash Hits
- Sniffin' Glue
- Songlines
- Sonic Seducer
- SoulTracks
- Soul Shine
- Soul Underground
- Sound & Vision (formerly Stereo Review)
- Sound on Sound
- Soundboard
- Sounds
- SoundsXP
- The Source
- Source: Music of the Avant Garde (or Source Magazine)
- Spex
- Spin
- Spuno
- Sruti
- State
- Stealth
- Stereogum
- Storyville
- The Strad
- Straight No Chaser
- Stranger
- Streetsound
- Street Cred
- Stylus Magazine
- Subkulture
- Suburban Voice
- Sun Zoom Spark
- 'SUP Magazine
- Svet Tambure
- Switch
- Synapse

== T ==
- TAGG – The Alternative Gig Guide
- Tape Op
- Taplas
- Teen Now
- TeenSet
- The Telegraph
- Tempo
- Teraz Rock
- Terrorizer
- Texas Music
- Tilllate (formerly M8)
- Time Off
- Tiny Mix Tapes
- The Tip Sheet
- Tom Tom Magazine
- Tonplein
- Tonspion
- Top 40
- Top of the Pops
- Top Pops
- Total Guitar
- Touch and Go
- Triad
- Triple J Magazine
- Trouser Press
- True Tunes News
- Tylko Rock

== U ==
- Ugly Planet
- Ugly Things
- UKChartsPlus
- Ukrainian Gothic Portal
- Uncut
- Under the Radar
- The Unsigned Guide
- Unsung Hero
- URB

== V ==
- VAN
- Variance
- Variety
- Vegas Rocks!
- Venus Zine
- Vibe
- VIBE Vixen
- Vintage Guitar
- The Vinyl Factory
- Visla Magazine
- Vive Le Rock
- Volume
- Vox
- Vreme zabave

== W ==
- WAMM (Windsor Arts & Music Monthly)
- Wasted Youth
- Wax Poetics
- Weiv
- The Western Way
- What Hi-Fi? Sound and Vision
- What's On The Hi-Fi
- White Fungus
- Who Put the Bomp
- The Wire
- WOM
- Women in Music
- Wonka Vision
- The Word

== X ==
- XLR8R
- XXL

== Y ==
- Young Guitar
- YU rock magazin

== Z ==
- Zeitschrift für Instrumentenbau
- Zeitschrift für Musikwissenschaft
- Zero
- Zero Tolerance
- ZigZag
- Zillo
- Zoo World

== See also ==
- Lists of magazines
