= List of magazines in Serbia =

== B ==
- Bazar

== H ==
- Hello

== K ==
- Kuhinjica

== L ==
- Lepota & Zdravlje

== N ==
- Nedeljnik
- NIN

== P ==
- PC Press, computer magazine
- Politikin Zabavnik

== R ==
- Radar

== S ==
- SAT Revija

== V ==
- Vreme

== Z ==
- Zvonik

== Defunct ==
- Aerosvet
- Duga
- Džuboks
- Evropa
- Evropljanin
- Galaksija
- Hard Metal
- Izgled
- Pogledi
- Ritam
- Rock
- Rock Express
- Standard
- Tempo
- YU rock magazin

== See also ==
- Media in Serbia
- List of newspapers in Serbia
- List of Serbian-language journals
- List of academic journals published in Serbia
