= George Faith =

- Also known as: Earl George, George Earl
- Born: Earl George Lawrence; 6 July 1946; Rae Town, Jamaica
- Died: 16 April 2003 (aged 56)
- Genres: Reggae, Lovers Rock
- Occupations: Singer, songwriter
- Years active: 1970 – late 1990s
- Labels: Black Ark, Island, GG's, Studio One, Black Swan

Earl George Lawrence (6 July 1946 – 16 April 2003), also known as George Faith, Earl George and George Earl, was a Jamaican reggae singer best known for his work in the 1970s with producers such as Lee "Scratch" Perry and Bunny Lee.

== Biography ==
Born in Rae Town, Lawrence was the son of a barber and a factory cook. His singing talent was first noted as a member of the school choir. He made his recording debut in 1970 with "See Me," produced by Clancy Eccles. In the early 1970s he worked with singer/producer Glen Lee, recording "Green Hills, I Won't Cry" and "Gonna Give Her All The Love I've Got". During the mid-1970s he was approached by Lee Perry, who ran a record shop a few doors away from Lee's studio, and under the name "George Earl" recorded a cover of William Bell's "To Be A Lover". This was followed by "Soulful Lover", "Since I Met You Baby" and "Island in the Sun" for producer Lloyd Campbell, and "Love Is Something", "So Many Ways" and "Love Depression" for Phil Pratt.

Lawrence recorded eight tracks with Perry, all covers of American soul and pop hits, at the Black Ark studio. These recordings took around eight months, which prompted Perry to suggest a stage name for George, telling him "You have a lot of faith. You should change your name to George Faith". As a result of Perry's deal with Island Records, the first record to be credited to "George Faith" was released in July 1977. "To Be a Lover" was issued on Island's Black Swan label, and proved more popular than any of the previous Jamaican versions of the song. The Jamaican release of the disco (12-inch single) featured a mix lasting nearly twelve minutes. Island issued "I've Got The Groove" as a follow-up, and a third disco 45 was issued later with George's cover of Wilson Pickett's "Midnight Hour". The productions by Lee "Scratch" Perry were collected together for George Faith's debut album, To Be a Lover, also released in Jamaica under the title Super Eight. The album proved popular, and a further single, "Opportunity" was released in February 1978.

Lawrence recorded a second album with Perry at the Black Ark in 1978, Working on the Guideline, although the album was not released, with only a few tracks being released, the singles "Guideline" and "Don't Be Afraid", Lawrence now recording original material with more "conscious" themes. Lawrence was also due to go on a tour that Perry was arranging with Island Records, but the plans were shelved in the midst of the erratic behaviour of Perry that would eventually lead to the destruction of the Black Ark.

Also in 1978, Lawrence recorded an album with Phil Pratt, One & Only, credited to "Earl George" and issued on the Trojan Records subsidiary Burning Sounds. He also recorded for Alvin Ranglin, these tracks issued in 1979 as the album Loving Something. He then recorded an album for Bunny Lee, Soulful, which took a similar approach to his first album and featured new versions of "To Be a Lover" and "Turn Back The Hands of Time". He again worked with Ranglin in the early 1980s on the Since I Met You Baby album. After living in Canada for a few years, he returned to the Jamaican recording scene in 1986, and released another album, Sings For Lovers Only in 1987.

Lawrence died in 2003 from cancer, at the age of 56.

== Discography ==
=== Albums ===
- Super Eight (1977) Black Art, also issued as To Be a Lover (1978) Island/Black Swan
- One & Only (1978) Burning Sounds
- Soulful (1979) Hollywood
- Loving Something (1979) GG's
- Since I Met You Baby (1982) GG's
- Happy Anniversary (1986)
- Sings for Lovers Only (1987) Nighthawk
- Just the Blues (1993) Studio One
- Rock for Lovers (1998) Nyam Up
- Reggae Got Soul (1999) Charly
- Reggae's Love & Affection (2002) Clocktower
- Together Forever (1999), Joe Frasier – Marie Baines & George Faith
- Straight to the Heart (2006), EAD

=== Singles ===
- "See Me" (1970)
- "Green Hills, I Won't Cry" (1973)
- "Gonna Give Her All The Love I've Got" (1973)
- "To Be a Lover" (1974)
- ""Soulful Lover" (197?)
- "Since I Met You Baby" (197?)
- "Island in the Sun" (197?)
- "Love Is Something" (197?)
- "So Many Ways" (197?)
- "Love Depression" (197?)
- "To Be a Lover (Have Mercy)" (1977) Island/Black Swan
- "Midnight Hour" (1977) island/Black Swan
- "All the Love I've Got" (1977) Island/Black Swan
- "I've Got the Groove" (1978) Island/Black Swan
- "Opportunity" (1978) Island
- "Guideline" (1978)
- "Don't Be Afraid" (1978) Upsetter
- "So Many Ways" (1978) Sunshot
- "Don't Be Afraid" (Discomix) (1979) Warrior
- "I Would Be Telling You a Lie" (1979) GG's
- "Sam Stone" (1979) GG's
- "Gipsy Woman"
- "I'm So Glad" (1979) Black & White
- "Follow Jah" (1979) Justice
- "What to Do" (1980) Paradise...
- "Give Me Music" (1981) Nura
- "Stealing Love" GG's
- "Say You Say Me" Top Rank
- "Old Fashioned Love" (1984)
- "Ordinary Girl" (1988) Pickout
- "Loving Someone" (1988)
- "Need to Belong to Someone" (1988) Bunny Lee
- "On My Own" Joe Frasier (with Marie Baines)
- "The End of the World" Studio One
- "Ask Her" Arrows
- "Lavender Blue" (1996)
