= Madman the Greatest =

British hip hop recording artist and music producer

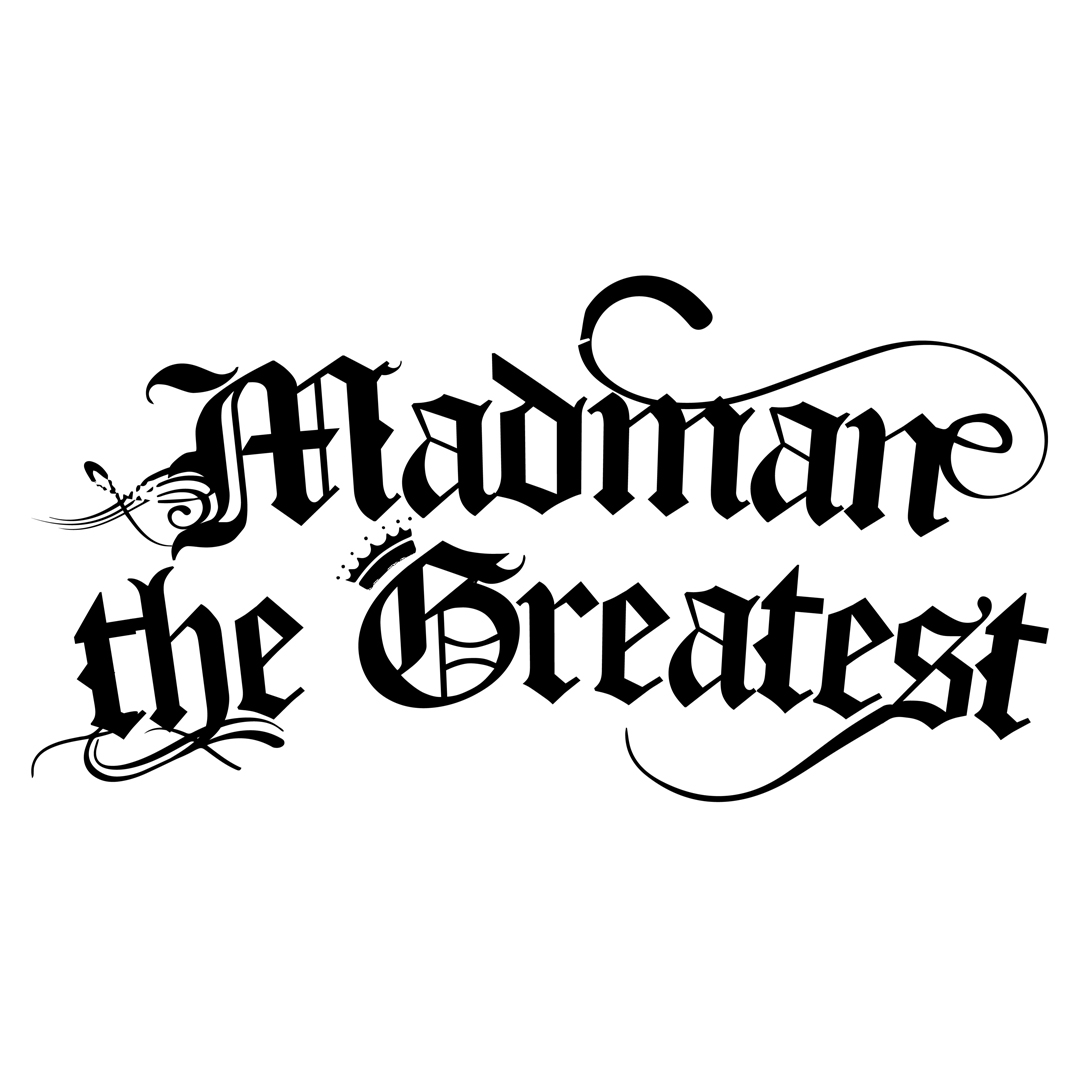
- Official Logo for Madman the Greatest

Background information
- Born: Birmingham, UK
- Genres: Alternative Hip hop, UK Hip Hop; RnB, Electronic House, Dancehall, UK Garage
- Label: Playaz Cliq Recordings

Madman the Greatest is a British hip hop recording artist and music producer from Birmingham, who has gained notoriety for his underground remixes of classic records including titles by Michael Jackson and Diana Ross, which have polarised his reputation. He is the founder of Playaz Cliq Recordings, the label responsible for his original releases. The label was nominated and won the UK Hip Hop and R&B Label of the year 2023 for Innovation in Business - Media Innovators Award, Best Multi-Genre Music Label 2024 for Midlands Enterprise Awards. & Best Independent Music Label 2026 for Midlands Enterprise Awards. & Under his GR8-1 Music Lab production camp, he is also responsible for the mastering and engineering of all the label's recordings.

== History ==
The artist began his releases with a compilation album called The Birth which has been quoted to go gold in Japan during 1998. Due his naivety, this has never been charted or documented by royalties societies. An article by Street Cred Magazine in 1999 made this public knowledge, which propelled his reputation as an artist. Since then, many of Madman the Greatest’s written appearances came from UK Magazine, Hip hop connection written by Mike Lewis. One of the quotes which established his reputation was "...If the UK had an equivalent to Flip Mode, Madman would be Busta Rhymes. If M.O.P had a UK franchise, Madman would operate it. Get the picture?..." Wordplay Magazine continues with the description quoting "...Madman The Greatest's magnetic presence and captivating flow inject an unmatched energy...that will dominate dancefloors"

The producer has been quoted for his energetic sound of "....Orchestral Stabs, rough beats and laser effect back in-yer–face lyrics". He often works as main composer for artists including fellow rhyming partners, Mr FX and Ruff MP, his character voices, DJ Zimm Zimmah and Alta Egoz X and under his EDM pseudonym, M Giggy. One of his quoted works is with Stars in Their Eyes finalist Cecil Foster who impersonated Luther Vandross on the show. Soon afterwards he and Madman the Greatest began recording together, producing their first single, "Fe Fi Fo", and a 12 track album called About Time.

Madman the Greatest’s reputation has expanded onto the internet file sharing sites where some of his remixes (or Dubplates) have flourished. Most notable is his remix of Michael Jackson’s "The Way You Make Me Feel" which polarized opinions with listeners describing it as "..one of the best remixes to hit the industry in ten years" "R U Crazy", which appears on a free mixtape called The UK Invasion was featured in the soap opera EastEnders on the 18 October 2013.

There was an official streaming station dedicated to Madman the Greatest and his musical associates entitled The Codename is Black which used to broadcast 24/7 of all the artists works. According to the Playaz Cliq website, it airs a variety of genres including Urban Contemporary, Hip hop, Dance and Instrumentals. Whilst the live stream has now closed, The Codename is Black produce 1 hour mixshow for the official Playaz Cliq YouTube Channel

== Official discography ==
Album Releases

- Madman the Greatest - ICYMI (Part 1&2) [2018 (re-released in 2023]
- Madman the Greatest - F'ing the Place Up [2023]
- Madman the Greatest - ICYSMI (...Here It Is Again) (The Distorted Clef Remixes) [2025]

EP Releases

- Madman the Greatest - 5ive #01 [2026]
- Madman the Greatest - Beats by Great #01 [2026]
- Madman the Greatest - 5ive #02 [2026]
- Madman the Greatest - Beats By Great #02 [2026]
- Madman the Greatest - 5ive #03 [2026]
- Madman the Greatest - Beats by Great #03 [2026]

Instrumental Albums

- Madman the Greatest - Composed for the Summer [2026]
