= Matti Goldschmidt =

Austrian music educator

Matti Goldschmidt (born 1951) is an Austrian-Israeli choreographer and author. He is particularly occupied with Israeli folk dance.

== Life ==
Goldschmidt grew up mostly in Germany and emigrated to Israel in January 1976, where he began dancing at Kibbutz Ma'agan Micha'el with Moshe Pinkas. He continued his original hobby in Haifa with Bentzi Tiram as well as with Jossi Abuhav (Be'er Sheva) and in Jerusalem with Eddi Sasson.

In 1979 he graduated from the Teacher's Seminary in Jerusalem under the guidance of Bracha Dudai, the so-called Ulpan, a training to become a dance master for Israeli folklore dances. In parallel, he studied Computer Sciences and History of Islamic Countries at the Hebrew University of Jerusalem. After finishing his studies he worked as a programmer and systems analyst in Israel, New Zealand and Germany. In 1983, he completed another one-year didactic course in dance at the same university, under the direction of Cyrelle Foremann and Shulah Bareqet.

In 1988, Goldschmidt took his first job as a dance teacher in Wellington (New Zealand). The following year he returned to Germany and took over the dance teaching courses at the Youth and Cultural Center of the Jewish Community of Munich and Upper Bavaria, which he still directs today (as of October 2026). In 1992 he founded the Israelisches Tanzhaus e.V., a registered charity, which he has chaired since the beginning, to popularize Israeli folk dance in German-speaking countries. On 24 November 2017, on the occasion of its 25th anniversary, ITH was honoured by the Lord Mayor of the City of Munich, Dieter Reiter, with a certificate for "its contribution to the cultivation of folk dance." In addition to leading several hundreds of dance workshops within Germany, Goldschmidt has also taught in other European countries, such as Austria, Croatia, the Czech Republic, England, France, Italy, Poland, Russia, or Switzerland. Upon invitations to the Far East he also instructed in Taiwan (2023 and 2024) as well as in Japan (2024).

Since 2012, he has been chairman of the Bavarian "Landesverband Tanz in Bayern e.V." (formerly "Landesarbeitsgemeinschaft Tanz in Bayern"), holding the position of vice-chairman since 2006.

Goldschmidt wrote several books and numerous articles in German on the subject of Israeli folk dance, e.g. in the periodicals Leipziger Folksblatt, the world music magazine Folker or the former association periodical "Tanzen" of the federal association "Deutscher Bundesverband Tanz e.V." (DBT), as well as sporadically for the professional periodical Rokdim, published in Tel Aviv in Hebrew and English. As a journalist, he wrote mainly for the monthlies Jüdische Zeitung (Berlin) in 2006–2012, and since 2014 more irregularly for Jüdische Rundschau. Most of his articles are in German.

He created a number of dances himself, including Yam Adonai, Shakharuth, Ha-Aviv Tzokheq, or A-Salam Aleikum as well as a couple version of Or ha-Ganuz. Since 1983 he has been a member of the union-affiliated "Irgun ha-Madrichim", the association of dance masters and choreographers for Israeli folklore dances in Israel.

== Book publications ==
- The Bible in Israeli Folk Dances. Choros-Verlag, Viersen 2001, ISBN 3-933512-12-3.
- Shiru ha-shir – Israeli folk dances. Volume 1, 1st edition. Obalski & Astor, Munich 1994, ISBN 3-922645-21-6.

== English Publications in periodicals (selection) ==
- Visiting Rivka Sturman, in: Rokdim (2001), no. 56, 39–41.
- The Bible in Israeli Folk Dances, in: Rokdim (2001), no. 57, 50–54.
- Celebrating in a Jewish Mode: Dance in Europe, the Yishuv and Israel. The Multifaced Nature of Israeli Folk Dance, in: Rokdim-Nirkoda (2018), no. 99, 35–37.
- July 2018: 20 Years of Machol Czechia, in: Rokdim-Nirkoda (2019), no. 101, 32–35.
- Camp Bitnua in Eilat. The World's Largest Camp for Israeli Dance and Folklore, in: Rokdim-Nirkoda (2020), no. 104, 46–48.
- His First Encounter with Folk Dance Has Changed His Life. A Conversation with Yoav Ashriel 23 Years Ago, in: Rokdim-Nirkoda (2021), no. 105, 8–12.
- Young Dancers from around the World. The Story of the Girls of the "Younger Generation" in Israeli Folk Dance, in: Rokdim-Nirkoda (2021), no. 107, 3–21.
- Israeli Folk Dancing in Australia (Part 1). On the Development of Folk Dance at the Various Dance Clubs in Australia, in: Rokdim-Nirkoda (2023), no. 111, 10-27.
- Israeli Folk Dancing in Australia (Part 2), in: Rokdim-Nirkoda (2023), no. 112, 16-21.
- From Seclusion to International Openess. Israeli Folk Dancing in Taiwan, in: Rokdim-Nirkoda (2023), no. 113, 18-21.
- Israeli Folk Dancing in Switzerland. On the Development of Israeli Folk Dance in Switzerland, Rokdim-Nirkoda (2024), no. 116, 19-31.
- Israeli Folk Dancing in Japan. The Experiences of a Dance Instructor from Germany in the Land of the Rising Sun, in: Rokdim-Nirkoda (2025), no. 117, 22-27.
- Israeli Folk Dancing in Austria, in: Rokdim-Nirkoda (2025), no. 118, 18-25.
- The Yemenite Roots of Israeli Folk Dancing, in: Rokdim-Nirkoda (2025), no. 119, 15-19.
- Israeli Folk Dance in Finland (Part 1), in: Rokdim-Nirkoda (2026), no. 120, 24-36.
- Israeli Folk Dance in Finland (Part 2), in: Rokdim-Nirkoda (2026), no. 121, 26-41.
