= Maris the Great =

American singer

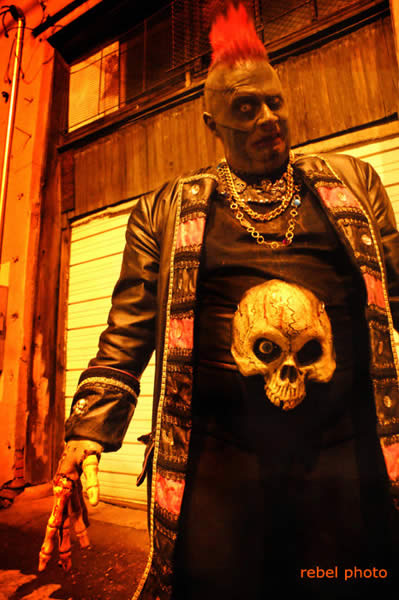
Maris the Great

Maris the Great is a promotional performance artist based in Denver, Colorado, and "undead" frontman for the punk rock band, Maris the Great and the Faggots of Death. He promotes bands through interviews on his website, MarisTheGreat.com. The interviews end with the fictional murder of the featured band and graphic photos of their demise. Notable bands he has interviewed include Kittie, Comeback Kid, and Throwdown. Maris refers to himself as "Headbanger and Zombie Fag Extraordinaire," for his musical preferences and outspoken homosexuality. He is known for his refusal to break character or appear without makeup in public.

== History ==
Maris the Great began working with Denver bands in 2000 to promote the local music scene. His website went live at midnight on June 1, 2000, and featured local pop-rock band, Rubber Planet, as its first guest. In 2005, Maris expanded to the national scene by promoting Massachusetts-based hardcore band, Bury Your Dead, and serving as their personal master of ceremonies on the Ozzfest tour. During his two weeks at Ozzfest, many of the attendees began to refer to him as "The Ozzfest Monster," prompting MTV to include a segment on him in their coverage of the festival. Fuse TV also ran a feature on the brain-eating zombie, as did Rue Morgue Magazine. Maris the Great has worked as a promoter for over 100 local and national acts.

Maris retired on July 30, 2011.

== The Faggots of Death ==
In 2000, Maris and Dan Bray formed The Faggots of Death as the real life version of Maris' originally fictitious band. The name is a parody of metal groups with monikers such as Stormtroopers of Death and Method of Destruction. Their MySpace page was removed from the site due to complaints about obscenity.

== Controversy ==
In 2001, police escorted Maris from the Denver PrideFest gay pride parade when organizers of the event asked to have him removed. After pressure from Maris' supporters, the PrideFest organizers eventually issued an apology.

Westword's Laura Bond stated that, "The sexually explicit, pro-gay aspect of maristhegreat.com has proved a flash point." Others have dismissed Maris' homosexuality as just part of the act. In an interview, Maris noted that his website "is not about sexuality; it's about challenging convention". But he also stated, "I always felt like an outsider to the gay community anyway, because I was deeply into Metal, Punk and Hardcore. It's only recently that I'm meeting other gay people in extreme music. But initially, I was all alone. Even today, I'd much rather be at a Death Metal show than a gay bar."

Paul Koehler, drummer for the Canadian post-hardcore band Silverstein, had Maris the Great removed from Warped Tour due to his belief that death is not a laughing matter. Members of Terror and Sworn Enemy had to be calmed by Maris's manager before they would accept his presence. And Groovey of Colorado Music Buzz Magazine called Maris "probably the most polarizing icon in music and entertainment there is."

The gore involved in Maris the Great's photo shoots have been a source of conflict and controversy in the past. After depicting the graphic death of KBPI's Matt Need online, police requested that Maris provide proof that the radio host was still alive. Emergency personnel have been summoned to photo shoots by members of the public who believed the blood was real, and police once blocked off an entire street after a faux severed penis was left on the sidewalk. Most of these incidents have ended amicably, with various authorities complementing Maris on the scenes' realism.

== Awards and honors ==
Westword — Best Web Site With Bite (2002)
