= Resident (magazine) =

Austrian music magazine

resident

- The cover of the magazine's first issue, released October 2005 and featuring MC Sinista.
- Editor: Nicolaus Klinger
- Categories: Drum and bass music
- Frequency: Quarterly
- Circulation: 2,000
- Founded: 2005 (20 years ago)
- First issue: 10 October 2005 (19 years ago)
- Final issue Number: 17 November 2008 (16 years ago); 12
- Company: Verein Resident
- Country: Austria
- Language: German
- Website: resident.at (in German)

Resident (styled as resident) was an Austrian music magazine with a strong focus on the German-speaking drum-and-bass industry.

== History and profile ==
The first issue was released in October 2005, which was accompanied by a drum-and-bass event in Vienna. Released quarterly, the magazine included a mix compact disc featuring a regional label or artist. The magazine's main idea was to promote the German and Austrian drum-and-bass industry.

The lineup featured more than fifteen acts, including internationally famous and not-yet-famous DJs, MCs and VJs. Acts included:

- John B
- Syncopix
- Basstikal
- Shroombab
- MC SINISTA
- Splinta
- MC Davox

With a circulation of 2,000 copies, it was the highest circulation German-speaking drum-and-bass magazine worldwide. The final issue was dated 17 November 2008.

== See also ==
- List of magazines in Austria
- List of music magazines
- Music of Austria
