= Music publication =

Music publication may refer to:

- Music publishers, publishers that specialize in distributing music
- Music magazines, magazines covering music and music culture
