= Nine-O-One Network =

Former American music magazine

Nine-O-One Network Magazine
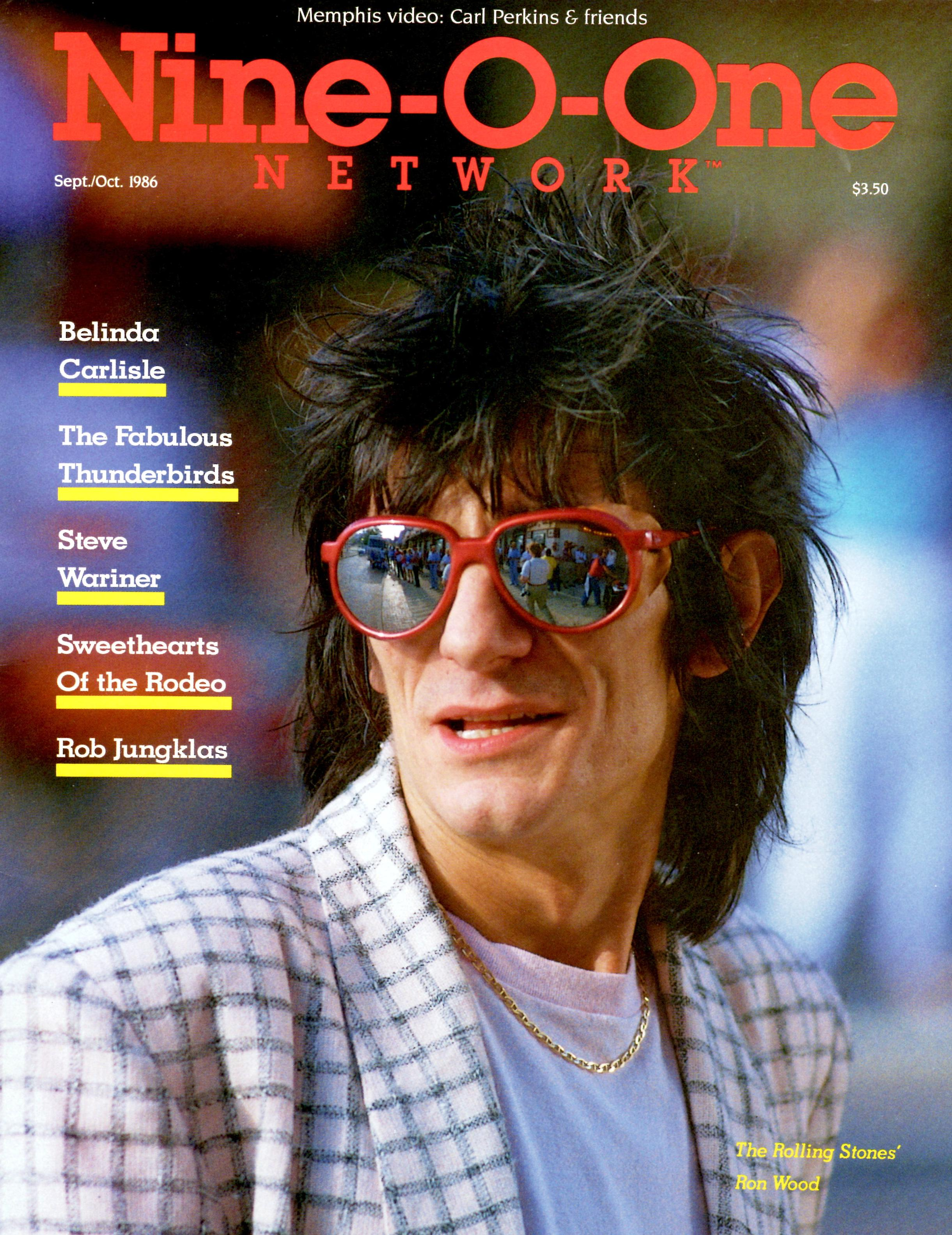
- Rolling Stone Ron Wood cover story, October 1986 issue
- Categories: Music magazine
- Frequency: Bi-monthly
- Founded: 1986 (40 years ago)
- First issue: 1986 (40 years ago) (September/October)
- Final issue: 1989 (37 years ago)
- Company: Nine-O-One Network, Inc.
- Country: United States
- Based in: Memphis, Tennessee
- Language: English
- OCLC: 24881957

Nine-O-One Network was an American bi-monthly music magazine published in Memphis, Tennessee from 1986 to 1989.

== Beginnings ==
The magazine originated during the heralded 1986 "Class of '55" recording session in Memphis with Johnny Cash, Jerry Lee Lewis, Roy Orbison and Carl Perkins. Producer Chips Moman asked James L. Dickerson, a reporter with The Commercial Appeal newspaper in Memphis, if he would create a magazine that could be used as part of a sales package for a telemarketing campaign for the album. Dickerson agreed to do it without fee if Moman would allow him to name the magazine, copyright it, and use it to launch a bi-monthly music magazine. Moman agreed, and the magazine was named Nine-O-One Network, the name derived from Memphis's telephone area code, 901. Dickerson resigned from The Commercial Appeal to publish the magazine so that he would not have a conflict of interest.

The first subscription check to arrive in the mail came from Cash. Soon afterward a subscription check arrived from Lewis.

By the end of the first year, the full-color, slick paper magazine had newsstand circulation in fourteen states. By the end of 1987 it was sold on newsstands in all 50 states and throughout Canada, and in selected cities in Portugal, Japan, Australia and the Soviet Union. The distributor was Capital Distribution Co. of Derby, Connecticut. At its peak, the magazine had a circulation of 100,000 which made it the third-largest music magazine in the United States, behind Rolling Stone and Spin.

Initially, the magazine was financed by Dickerson, who used his savings and cashed in his life insurance policy to live on and pay start-up costs. The magazine was incorporated in the State of Tennessee and preferred common stock was offered, all of it purchased by 25 Mississippi and Tennessee investors.

The first issue featured a photograph of Cash, Perkins, Orbison and Lewis. The second issue featured Rolling Stone Ron Wood as the cover story, with inside articles about Belinda Carlisle, the Fabulous Thunderbirds, Steve Wariner and Sweethearts of the Rodeo. The eclectic mix reflected the magazine's philosophy that a true American music magazine should contain articles about all the major forms of native music – rock and roll, country, blues and jazz.

== Covers ==
- Issue 1 – Johnny Cash, Jerry Lee Lewis, Roy Orbison and Carl Perkins
- Issue 2 – Ron Wood of The Rolling Stones
- Issue 3 – Deborah Allen
- Issue 4 – Aimee Mann
- Issue 5 – Robert Cray
- Issue 6 – Gregg Allman
- Issue 7 – Elvis Presley
- Issue 8 – David Bowie and Ringo Starr
- Issue 9 – The Bangles and B.B. King
- Issue 10 – Ann and Nancy Wilson of Heart; Waylon Jennings
- Issue 11 – Dan Fogelberg, Willie Nelson and Yes

== Information for music scholars ==
Back issues of Nine-O-One Network Magazine are available at:

- Memphis, Tennessee, Public Library, Benjamin Hooks Central Library Benjamin L. Hooks Central Library

== Magazine spin-off ==
In 1988, the magazine formed a spin-off company to produce a radio syndication called Pulsebeat – Voice of the Heartland. With James L. Dickerson as executive producer, the company produced two programs – a 30-minute, weekly country music program that was carried by about 60 radio stations from coast to coast, and a 60-minute blues program that was produced in partnership with Helena, Arkansas, radio station KFFA-Am, which had broadcast since 1941 the universally acclaimed King Biscuit Time show.

Both syndicated programs featured radio personality Kim Spangler. Veteran King Biscuit announcer "Sunshine" Sonny Payne, KFFA general manager George Hays and Memphis radio personality Henry Nelson also hosted segments on the blues show. The weekly blues show was broadcast by 40 stations from New York City to the Yukon. Featured guests included Stevie Ray Vaughan, B.B. King, Bobby "Blue" Bland, Melissa Etheridge and Little Milton. Pulsebeat—Voice of the Heartland ceased operations in 1990.

== See also ==
- List of defunct American magazines
- List of music magazines
