= James Burrowes =

Jamaican cricketer and physician

Personal information
- Full name: James Taylor Burrowes
- Born: 28 February 1914; Rae Town, Surrey County, Jamaica
- Died: 15 October 2003 (aged 89); Miami, Florida, United States
- Batting: Right-handed
- Bowling: Right-arm (unknown style)

Domestic team information
- Years: Team
- 1934: Oxford University

Career statistics
Competition	First-class
Matches	1
Runs scored	3
Batting average	3.00
100s/50s	–/–
Top score	3
Balls bowled	48
Wickets	0
Bowling average	–
5 wickets in innings	–
10 wickets in match	–
Best bowling	–
Catches/stumpings	–/–
- Source: Cricinfo, 24 May 2020

James Taylor Burrowes (28 February 1914 – 15 October 2003) was a Jamaican first-class cricketer and medical doctor.

Burrowes was born at Rae Town in the Colony of Jamaica. He later studied in England at St John's College at the University of Oxford as a Rhodes Scholar. While studying at Oxford, he made a single appearance in first-class cricket for Oxford University against a combined Minor Counties team at Oxford in 1934. Opening the batting for Oxford in their only innings, Burrowes was run out for 3 runs. He bowled eight overs across the match, conceding 37 runs without taking a wicket.

After graduating from Oxford, Burrowes became a physician specialising in obstetrics and gynecology. He spent the last eleven years of his life in Miami, where he died in October 2003.
