= Die Caufner-Schwestern =

- Origin: East Germany
- Genres: Pop, disco
- Years active: 1977-1982
- Labels: Amiga
- Members: Juliane Albrecht; Irina Kaufner
- Past members: Iris Kaufner; Isa Kaufner

Die Caufner-Schwestern was a vocal trio founded in East Germany in 1977. The members of the group were the three sisters Juliane Albrecht (née Kaufner), Isa Kaufner and Irina Kaufner. The group mainly played disco music.

== Band history ==
Even as children, the four sisters Iris, Juliane, Isa and Irina Kaufner sang polyphonic movements together in Rostock. Juliane and Isa received vocal training from 1972 to 1973 and were members of the College Formation. The pieces Dein und mein, Als ich nachher von dir ging and Vom Träumen with Isa Caufner as solo singer was on the compilation LP Examen in Musik, published in 1973. Juliane Kaufner married the musician and later Amiga music producer Klaus-Peter "Biene" Albrecht. In 1976, the four sisters founded the vocal quartet Caufner-Collection. In 1977, they were featured on the television show Familien-Disko. Iris Kaufner left the group. The band had to rename itself to Caufner-Schwestern. By 1978, there was five episodes for the family disco. In 1978, their first single Komm doch was released; the follow-up single "Laß dieses „he“" was released in the same year. For their tour program Drei unterwegs, they were awarded the sponsorship award by the General Director of the Komitee für Unterhaltungskunst. Die Caufner-Schwestern appeared on the television show Ein Kessel Buntes and also performed concerts abroad.

In 1980, Isa Kaufner left the trio to perform as Isa Caufner. Among other things, she played for three months in November 1980 in the play "Die Menschenfresserin" by the Bulgarian dramatist Ivan Radojew at the Volksbühne Berlin. In 1982 the piece Man weiß ja nie by Die Caufner-Schwestern and Ich bin ich by Isa Caufner were released on a compilation LP. Juliane Albrecht and Irina Kaufner performed as a duo until 1987. Irina died of cancer in 2010. In 1989, Juliane Albrecht and her husband and other musicians founded the country band Country Delight, to which they still belong as of 2016.

== Discography ==
=== Singles ===
- 1978: Komm doch / Ich hab’ dich lieb (Amiga)
- 1978: Laß dieses „he“ / Was nun (Amiga)

=== In compilations ===
- 1982: Man weiß ja nie und Ich bin ich (Solo von Isa Caufner) auf Hast du mich noch lieb? (Amiga)

== Literature ==
- Artikel in Melodie und Rhythmus 6/80
