= Folker =

Folker may refer to:

- Folker (album)
- Folker (magazine)
