= Metal Hammer =

British metal music magazine

- Cover of the July 2024 issue (UK)
- Editor: Eleanor Goodman
- Categories: Music magazine
- Frequency: Monthly
- Total circulation: 20,961 (ABC Jan – Dec 2015)
- Founder: Wilfried F. Rimensberger; Jürgen Wigginghaus
- Founded: 1983
- Company: Future (UK); Axel Springer SE (Germany)
- Country: United Kingdom
- Based in: London
- Language: English
- Website: loudersound.com/metal-hammer
- ISSN: 0955-1190

Metal Hammer is a heavy metal music magazine and website founded in 1983, published in the United Kingdom by Future, with other language editions published by different companies available in numerous other countries. Metal Hammer features news, reviews and long-form articles covering both major and underground bands in heavy metal, as well as covering rock, punk, grunge and other alternative music genres.

== Publication history ==
Wilfried F. Rimensberger conceived Metal Hammer in 1983, taking the idea of a rock magazine publishing in different languages to Jürgen Wigginghaus, publisher of the German magazine MusikSzene, where Rimensberger was chief editor. Wigginghaus helped launch the German edition of Metal Hammer soon after, while Rimensberger launched the flagship, English language version from London in November 1986, installing Harry Doherty, formerly of Melody Maker, as editor. The magazine would grow to be published in 11 different languages around the world, including local language editions in Israel, Japan, Serbia, Spain, The Netherlands, Italy, Poland, Hungary and France, also becoming the first Western youth publication in the Soviet Union.

Metal Hammer was bought by Dennis Publishing in 1994, who sold it to Future in 2000. In 2013, start-up publisher TeamRock bought the magazine alongside sister titles Classic Rock and Prog. Future bought the three back following the collapse of TeamRock in December 2016.

In 2018, Future renamed the Teamrock.com website as Louder, a continuation of the 'parent brand' model for Metal Hammer, Classic Rock and Prog that would house all three magazines' websites.

Metal Hammer Germany was sold separately to Axel Springer SE in 1999.

== Brand extensions ==
=== Metal Hammer Golden Gods Awards ===
The Golden Gods Awards were established in 2003 by then-editor Chris Ingham, designed to commemorate the biggest and most exciting names in heavy metal. The annual ceremony, featuring band performances in front of a live crowd, took place from 2003 to 2018. Over the course of 15 years, the likes of Ozzy Osbourne, Iron Maiden, Motörhead, Slipknot, Tony Iommi, Brian May, Dave Mustaine, Rob Zombie, Bill Bailey, Chris Jericho and more either performed or appeared at the awards.

=== Podcasts and radio shows ===
The Metal Hammer Podcast was launched in 2009, originally presented by Metal Hammer staff members James Gill and Terry Bezer and covering weekly news and events from the world of metal, as well as reviews of new albums from prominent artists. It'd go on to be presented by Merlin Alderslade, Stephen Hill and Amit Sharma, before being put on hold in 2013 as Metal Hammer launched The Metal Hammer Radio Show on TeamRock's newly founded digital radio station. The radio show continued until 2018, when it was taken off air.

In 2016, Metal Hammer launched a limited ...In Residence series in partnership with Spotify, presented by Alderslade, Luke Morton and then-Metal Hammer editor-in-chief, Alexander Milas. The show produced six episodes featuring exclusive interviews with major metal artists, including Iron Maiden and Bring Me The Horizon.

After a five-year hiatus, The Metal Hammer Podcast returned in 2018, hosted by Alderslade, Morton and Eleanor Goodman, staying on air for four more years before going back on hiatus in 2022.

=== Magazines in other territories ===
There are independently owned Greek and Italian Metal Hammer publications, while Portuguese and Japanese (licensed from the Metal Hammer UK/Future) editions of the publication were launched in 2019 and 2020 respectively.

In Germany, Metal Hammer is still published by Axel Springer SE.

Between 1999 and 2002, a Hebrew licensed edition was published in Israel.

== See also ==
- Decibel
- Malcolm Dome
- Kerrang!
- Livewire
- Joel McIver
- Rock Hard
