= Johann Christoph Neupert =

German piano manufacturer

Neupert is the name of a German manufacturer of keyboard instruments based in Bamberg. It takes its name from its founder, Johann Christoph Neupert.

== Family and Business ==
After attending the trade school in Wunsiedel and an apprenticeship as a carpenter with his father, J.C. Neupert began a piano maker's apprenticeship at the Seidel piano factory in Oldenburg. After working for piano manufacturing companies in Germany and abroad, including Johann Baptist Streicher in Vienna, he founded his own piano factory in Münchberg in 1868. In 1874, he moved the rapidly growing business to Bamberg. In 1900 he founded a sales store in Nuremberg (at the Museumsbrücke). After completing their apprenticeships, the three sons of the founder took over the company in 1918. Fritz (1872-1952) was entrusted with the technical management, Reinhold (1874-1955) with the commercial administration and Julius (1877-1970) with the musical consulting and artist promotion. In the third generation, the company was continued by one son of each of the three brothers. Wolf Dieter Neupert (*1937), grandson of Fritz N., took over sole responsibility for the company in the fourth generation.

== The Neupert harpsichords ==
Among the pianists who played on Neupert concert grand pianos were Max Reger, Elly Ney, Walter Gieseking, Wilhelm Kempff, August Schmidt-Lindner, Edwin Fischer, Wilhelm Backhaus and Richard Staab.

J. C. Neupert was a passionate collector of historical keyboard instruments. The "Neupert Piano Historical Collection", which was continued by his descendants and today comprises over 300 exhibits, has been housed in the Germanisches Nationalmuseum in Nuremberg since 1968.

On the basis of this collection, Neupert built harpsichords, then also spinets, clavichords and fortepianos from 1906 onwards. This made the company the largest of its kind in Germany and the world's oldest among the workshops engaged in harpsichord building today.

== Bibliography ==
- Johann Christoph Neupert, obituary by Paul de Wit in: Zeitschrift für Instrumentenbau, Jg.42 (1921/22), Nr.1, p. 5 (Digitalisat)
- Hubert Henkel in: Enzyklopädie Musik in Geschichte und Gegenwart, 2nd edition, Personenteil, vol.12, Kassel 2004, sp. 1026-1027.
- Wolf Dieter Neupert, 1868-2018 J. C. NEUPERT 150 Jahre Musikinstrumentenbau, Bamberg 2018, pp. 9–15.

== See also ==
- History of the harpsichord
