= Punk Rock Confidential =

Punk Rock Confidential may refer to:

- Punk Rock Confidential (magazine), a quarterly lifestyle magazine
- Punk Rock Confidential (album), a 1998 album by The Queers
