= Powerline =

Powerline may refer to:

== Technology ==
- Overhead power line, used for electric power transmission
- Power-line communication, a computer networking technology
- Powerline, a status line plugin for vim and other application; see Private Use Areas

== Music and media ==
- Powerline (magazine), an American music magazine and website
- Power Line, a political blog
- ”AAA Powerline”, a 2018 single by Ecco2k later appearing on E
- "Powerlines", a 2017 song by Tame Impala from Currents B-Sides & Remixes
- "Power Lines", a 2016 single by TIGRESS
- "Power Lines", a 2012 song by Reks from Straight, No Chaser
- "Powerline", a 1985 song by Hüsker Dü, from their New Day Rising album
- Powerline, a fictional singer in the A Goofy Movie musical
- "Powerline" (C.A.T.S. Eyes), a 1986 television episode

== Sport ==
- Powerlines F.C., South African soccer club
