= Rock N Roll Experience Magazine =

Rock N Roll Experience
- Front Page for www.rocknrollexperience.com
- Editor: Bob Suehs
- Categories: Music magazine
- Frequency: Daily
- First issue: November 5, 1992
- Final issue: 2000 (print)
- Country: USA
- Based in: Maryland
- Language: English
- Website: www.rocknrollexperience.com

Official logo of Rock N Roll Experience

Rock N Roll Experience Magazine is a Maryland based publication that started out in 1992 as a print zine and switched over to an online zine in 2000. The magazine is devoted to music and popular culture and is updated daily with reviews and interviews. The publication was created by Bob Suehs when he was 16 years old & still in high school. It remained in print for nearly a decade but switched over to an online only web site as the print medium slowly started to die out.

== Beginnings ==
In the 1992 the first issue of Rock N Roll Experience debuted with reviews on Kiss, Alice in Chains & comic books.

It was Bob Suehs's vision to offer a zine that delivered original interviews & reviews that focused on rock bands & the culture of rock music.

In 1993 Bob Suehs, owner/publisher of Rock N Roll Experience was recognized by the state of Maryland for his creation of the magazine and was given an award.

Rock N Roll Experience remained in print till the end of the 1990s. As the print medium started to die out the magazine went to an online format which then gave it a worldwide audience.

== Through the years ==
Rock N Roll Experience has featured exclusive interviews with some of the biggest names in music over the years including Gene Simmons & Paul Stanley from Kiss, Rob Halford from Judas Priest, Bruce Dickinson from Iron Maiden, Al Jourgensen from Ministry, Chris Cornell from Soundgarden & many, many more.

Former Marilyn Manson bassist Gidget Gein told the magazine in a 1999 interview that he wanted people to remember him as, "Somebody that was like a total fuck up, crazier, more out of control than like anybody, somebody that was like that, but totally changed & got their shit together, but was still cool & somebody that they could look up to. I was really out of control back then, but now I've got it together & I'd like to influence people in a positive way, especially with what's going on now..."

Rock N Roll Experience was the first publication in the world to cover and publish photos from the first Hellyeah concert which was Vinnie Paul's first concert onstage prior to the death of Pantera guitarist Dimebag Darrell.

Glenn Danzig fell offstage in Baltimore and Rock N Roll Experience featured exclusive coverage of this event which included an exclusive YouTube video of the fall. The YouTube video had over 100,000 hits before it was taken down.

Former Kiss guitarist Ace Frehley told Rock N Roll Experience in a 2009 interview that the Kiss single Modern Day Delilah "Sounded like it could be something off an album they did in the '80s."

Former Danzig guitarist John Christ made his first onstage appearance in over 10 years and Rock N Roll Experience featured the only exclusive coverage of the event.

Marilyn Manson drummer Chris Vrenna told Rock N Roll Experience in a 2011 interview that he was no longer a member of Nine Inch Nails because, "Trent's an asshole! He was a really bad drug addict and a bad person and I couldn't take it anymore" and in that same interview he gave exclusive news dirt on the new[Marilyn Manson record. This was the last interview Chris Vrenna did before he quit Marilyn Manson.

Rock N Roll Experience is known for its edgy interviews that ask the questions most will not dare to ask and in April 2012 Bob Suehs and Rock N Roll Experience went to New York City to film segments for VH-1's Pantera Behind the Music Remastered program which aired on April 6, 2013.

Danzig played Maryland on June 4, 2012, and Rock N Roll Experience covered the show which almost did not happen due to Glenn Danzig being sick. The show the following night on June 5, 2012, in Pennsylvania was cancelled due to Glenn's illness.
