= Foley Magazine =

Australian music magazine

- Editor: Alannah Sawyer, Eleni Vitale, Madison Woods
- Frequency: Quarterly
- Format: A4
- Founder: Alannah Sawyer, Eleni Vitale, Madison Woods
- Founded: 2020
- Country: Australia

Foley Magazine is an Australian music magazine which focuses on Melbourne-based music.

== History ==
Foley Magazine was started by founding editors Alannah Sawyer, Eleni Vitale, and Madison Woods, while studying for Bachelor of Arts degrees in music industry at RMIT University, growing from a final group assignment. They wanted to bring focus to different facets of the local music industry, including musicians, record labels, radio shows, writers, and visual artists.

Foley's first issue was published October 2020, with a focus on supporting local and emerging artists who were affected during the COVID-19 pandemic.

The third issue was launched at the Gasometer Hotel with performances from local bands Treefrogs, Elsie Lange, and The Vovos.

Each issue takes two months to put together, with a mixture of work submitted and work by each of the three editors. They have said they aim for at least 50% female-led content to stand apart from traditional male-led music press.

At the start of 2022 the magazine received $10,000 funding from the Victoria State Government to support production.

In May 2022 the seventh issue of Foley Magazine was published and made available at record stores in Melbourne.
