= Phlow =

German webzine

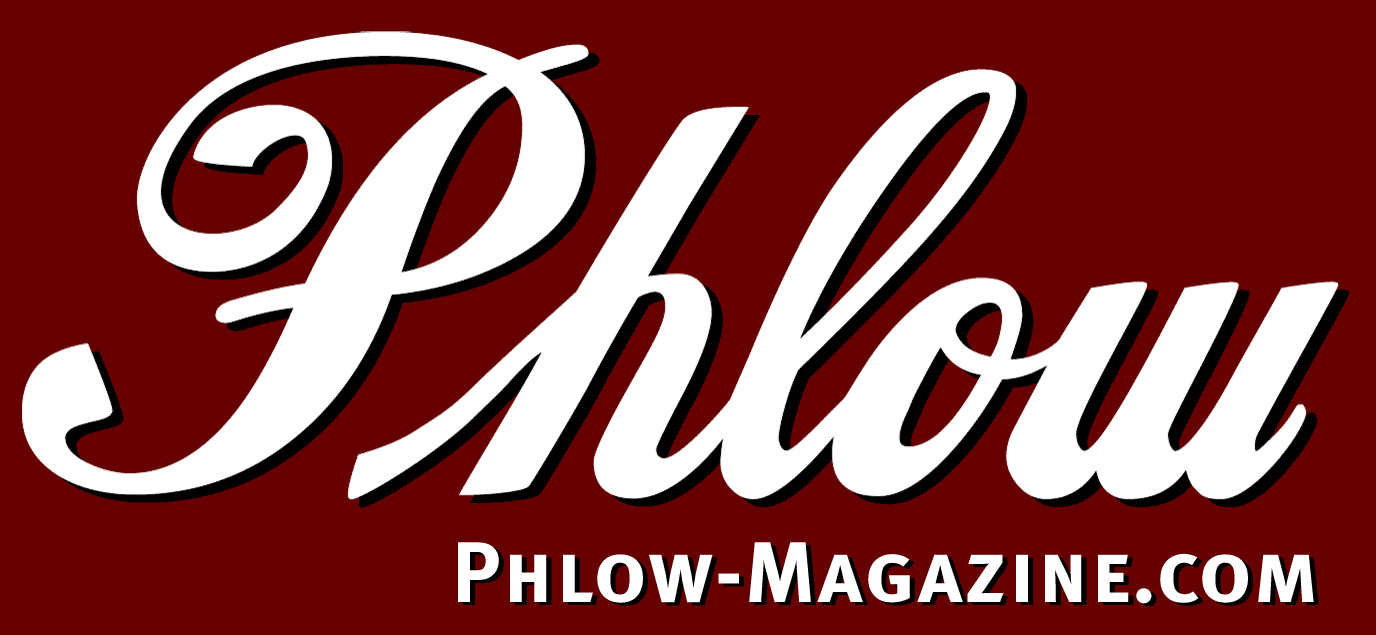
- Logo of Phlow Magazine
- Editor-in-Chief: Moritz "mo." Sauer
- Categories: Music magazine Netlabel Creative Commons
- Frequency: daily
- Publisher: Phlow
- First issue: 2000
- Company: Phlow
- Country: Germany
- Language: German, English and Spanish
- Website: www.phlow-magazine.com www.phlow.de phlowmagazine.wordpress.com

Phlow is a German webzine founded by Moritz "mo." Sauer, a German journalist. The magazine initially focused on publishing interviews, portraits and reviews about artists who release their music licensed under creative commons and several forms of netculture. Since its birth in 2000 Phlow evolved and initiated the Netlabel Catalogue, a directory of netlabels, and started an international version in English in September 2007, called Phlow-Magazine.com. Together with Christian Negre Moritz "mo." Sauer started Phlow.es, a Spanish version of Phlow.

== Overview ==
Started in 2000 and relaunched in 2002, Phlow is an electronic magazine that publishes interviews, portraits and reviews about music released by netlabels or music released under a creative commons licence. Since 2002 Phlow interviewed musicians, bands and producers from all over the world. Its editor Moritz "mo." Sauer established Phlow in the evolving world of netlabels and covered the culture and history of netlabels in several magazines, events and media.

In 2004 Phlow was nominated for the Grimme Online Award – an award for publishing quality on the web. Phlow was nominated in the category of 'Media Journalism'.

With the English edition started in late 2007, Phlow has published for an international audience. While reviews about music licensed under a creative commons can still be found, free mixes and compilations can also be downloaded. While Phlow magazine editors write about music, Phlow also produces a podcast to promote free music to its readers.

On June 12 and 13, 2010 the Phlow staff organised with like-minded creative commons activists from Cologne Commons, a conference and music festival about free music and creative commons culture.

In July 2009 Moritz "mo." Sauer started the Spanish edition of Phlow with Netaudio activist Christian Negre, better known as Applejux. The Spanish edition discontinued in 2012. The original version moved from Phlow.es to WordPress.com.
