= Bass Quarterly =

Music magazine from Germany, from 2008

- Editor: Stefan Fulde
- Categories: Music Magazine (guitar focus)
- Frequency: Quarterly
- Publisher: PNP-Verlag; Media4Music
- Founded: 2008
- Country: Germany
- Based in: Neumarkt in der Oberpfalz
- Language: German
- Website: www.bassquarterly.de

Bass Quarterly is a major German-based music magazine for bass players. The magazine was established in 2008. The publishers are PNP-Verlag and Media4Music. The headquarters of the magazines is in Neumarkt in der Oberpfalz. It centres its issues around technical news, electrics, reviews, vintage guitars and interviews with musicians.

World renowned bass players have been interviewed, as Bill Wyman (The Rolling Stones), Linley Marthe (Joe Zawinul), Felix Pastorius, Romain Labaye (Scott Henderson), Geddy Lee (Rush), Gabriel Severn, Robert Trujillo (Metallica) and many others.
