= Sandman (magazine) =

Sandman was a free music magazine launched in Sheffield, South Yorkshire, in September 2002. Later versions were created, specifically covering Leeds, Kingston upon Hull, York, Nottingham and Manchester before all five editions were amalgamated into one compendium edition which also covered Manchester, Bradford, Derby and Leicester making Sandman the largest independent publication of its kind in the UK.

Sandman's aims were simply to cover and support the local music scenes of the cities in which it was published.

== History ==
The first issue was launched on 27 September 2002 by Jan Webster (Editor in Chief) and Mark Roberts (Publisher). Webster and Roberts had both been involved with the local music scene as performers and promoters. The Leeds edition launched on 30 September 2003, Hull on 15 March 2004, York on 15 October 2004 and Nottingham on 4 April 2005. From February 2006, these editions were merged into a single, large regional magazine. The last print edition of Sandman was published in September 2008 and the last on-line entry was posted in May 2009.

== Features ==
- Interviews,
- live reviews (including those of unsigned, national and international level bands)
- Album reviews
- Demo reviews.
- Nightlife
- Culture.

Volunteers contributed Sandman's articles, the revenue being made from advertising charges and subscription fees. Sandman never accepted advertorials and aimed simply to be independent and honest. It was distributed in record and instrument shops as well as venues, clubs and pubs.

== Readership ==
At its highest the readership was around 50,000 across Yorkshire, Lancashire and the East Midlands

== Notable bands ==
A number of now nationally famous acts were covered early on in their careers by Sandman, most notably The Kaiser Chiefs in Leeds and Arctic Monkeys and Reverend & The Makers in Sheffield. Sandman gained recognition and praise from figures such as the radio DJ Steve Lamacq and Simon Williams of Fierce Panda Records. From 2005 Sandman Magazine worked with the Mean Fiddler organisation helping pick unsigned bands to play at the Leeds Festival.

== See also ==
- List of music magazines
