= Side Stage Magazine =

American music magazine

Side Stage
- Editor: Brandon Delano
- Categories: Music magazine
- Frequency: Monthly
- Founded: 2015
- Country: United States
- Language: English
- Website: sidestagemagazine.com

Side Stage Magazine is a monthly magazine that focuses primarily on rock music and alternative music. The magazine was founded in 2015 by Brandon Delano.

== History ==
The site was founded by Brandon Delano in August 2015. Delano has previously been a contributing writer for Shockwave Magazine. Delano, who had long been a music photographer before a beat writer wanted to take a more visual approach to writing.

In an interview with Haulix Daily, Delano described making the magazine as "I thought if Im going to put the hours, and hardwork involved in running a magazine, tha it might as well be mine. So late one night I decided to jump in head first and launch a magazine."

Since the foundation, the magazine has grown to a full-time staff of four writers and a columnist for the website, where Delano serves as the editor. The staff has collaborated with various radio channels, and PR news agencies.
