= Gonzo (magazine) =

Dutch culture and music magazine

Gonzo (circus)
- Categories: Music magazine
- Frequency: Bi-monthly
- First issue: 1991
- Country: Belgium; Netherlands
- Based in: Amsterdam
- Language: Dutch
- Website: www.gonzocircus.com

Gonzo (circus) is a Dutch-language bi-monthly culture and music magazine, first published in 1991 in Belgium. It is based in Amsterdam, Netherlands. The magazine primarily focuses on contemporary musical genres such as punk, industrial, hip hop, jazz, improvised music, modern classical music, indie rock, noise, electronic music and world music. The founders are Stefan Joosten and Dirk Vreys. Since 1995 each publication is accompanied by a compilation CD under the name Mind the Gap, featuring new artists.

In June 1998 Guy Bleus organised a retrospective exhibition of Gonzo (circus) (1991-1998) and Mind The Gap (1995-1998) at the Centre for Visual Arts (now Z33) in Hasselt (Belgium).

Gonzo (circus) is published by the publisher Virtumedia.
