= Switch (Mexican magazine) =

Mexican online music magazine

Switch (stylized in all caps) is a Mexican online music magazine. It was founded in the 1990s in print and published by Editorial Premiere. However, the magazine stopped circulating new issues after February 2011. The final cover featured singer Max Cavalera of Cavalera Conspiracy.

After 12 years, Switch revived in a digital format in May 2023.

It is the only Mexican music magazine to be awarded at an international level by the Society of Publication Designers (SPD).

== History ==
The magazine was founded in the 1990s by Benjamín Salcedo, Xavier Velasco, and Fernando Rivera Calderón. The magazine primarily focused on rock music in its beginning, but the magazine shifted focus to include additional genres at different stages of its operations.

After closing in 2011, it returned to the online format in May 2023.
