= Sentimentalist Magazine =

Former American music and culture magazine

- Categories: Music
- Frequency: Quarterly
- Founded: 1999
- Final issue: 2008
- Country: United States
- Based in: New York, New York
- Language: English
- Website: sentimentalistmag.com

Sentimentalist Magazine was an American magazine of indie rock music and culture, which was published quarterly.

== History ==
Launched in New York City, New York, in 1999 as The Sentimentalist, it changed its title to The Sentimentalist Magazine with Issue 14, and then dropped the definite article from Issue 16. As of January 2008, the magazine had been relaunched as an online-only publication. It continued for several years to publish "magazine covers" with each monthly online issue. The site has not been updated since 2015.

Sentimentalist Magazine was started as an indie music and culture print magazine. It was voted as PLUG Awards nominee in the category "Zine of the Year" in 2007, and again in 2008.

As of January 2008, Sentimentalist Magazine was relaunched as an online-only magazine. The magazine's mission is to give indie bands from around the world the exposure they might not have otherwise encountered.

Sentimentalist Magazine's editor was Madeline Virbasius-Walsh.

== See also ==
- List of music magazines
