= Editorial Premiere =

Editorial Premiere was a Mexican magazine publishing company. The company's magazines focused on niche topics with the goal of informing, entertaining and educating readers.

In December 2010, Editorial Premiere ceased operations and the magazines Cine Premiere and Inversionista were acquired by publisher Impresiones Aéreas SA de CV

== Publications ==
- Cine Premiere
- SWITCH
- Inversionista
- MAX
- FHM Mexico
- Eve
