= Music Industry Online =

Online magazine

Music Industry Online (also called MIO) was online music magazine that has been reporting on the South African music industry since December 1999 when it was known as PC Music.

== History and profile ==
Music Industry Online was founded by Josh Adler in November 1999 as PC Music, with Adler himself as its editor. Initially, PC Music, would send a monthly newsletter to about 50 subscribers, explaining the basics of using personal computers to make electronic music. The first issue was sent out in December 1999 from its headquarters in Johannesburg.

In 2000 Adler partnered with Jeff Fletcher - who had founded a discussion list for South African electronic musicians on the Hivemind Network, to create a small community of subscribers and a simple website. For a while, the PC Music newsletter would be distributed electronically each month, and then archived on the website. As the mailing list grew, Adler invited two of his computer science classmates in January 2001: Asher Lipson and Sam Hutchinson, whom at the time became MIO's Technical Director.

The decision set in place an entirely new phase for PC Music, which then changed name to Music Industry Online, best known as MIO in 2005. This witnessed an influx of resources in the form of writers who updated the site with regular news and feature content, drawing audiences both South Africa and abroad. Forums and discussion boards were introduced and moderators elected to keep a watchful eye on the use of offensive behavior.

The content also started undergoing subtle changes, from being information based purely on how to make electronic music, to incorporating other music genres and all sectors of the music industry, namely DJing, Artists, Music Business, Education, Events, Music Reviews and the Music Tech sections.

It 2005 two more journalists joined MIO on a full-time basis; Taryn Lee-Bigger and Phash Ratshilumela.

Richard Rumney joined MIO as editor in chief in 2007 when Adler stepped down from editorial obligations. In 2007 Adler and Hutchinson decided to focus on MIO’s mother company, Prefix Technologies, which they co-own and left MIO in the hands of Rumney and Ratshilumela. The same year, MIO was registered under a new umbrella: MIO Media. At the time, Adler and Hutchinson were still active partners with Rumney and Ratshilumela becoming share holders.

From October 2008 to early 2011, MIO and the Southern African Music Rights Organisation (SAMRO) ran a section called SA Music Good News, which only focuses at writing about positive developments in the South African Music Industry. This section was headed by Ratshilumela and became his sole responsibility.

Rumney remained MIO’s Editor in Chief until October 2009, when Ratshilumela took over.

Music Industry Online was only accessible on the web all this time and sent regular newsletters. It was seen as one of South Africa's major online music magazines. The magazine strived to be a catalyst for growth in the South African music industry and this had seen a number of initiatives aimed at encouraging the South African music industry.

In October 2014, Music Industry Online relaunched under new ownership, after being bought from the previous owners by 882 People Media. No information is however available concerning the publication’s continued existence following the transition.

== Editorship ==
- Josh Adler: 1999-2005
- Richard Rumney: 2007-2009
- Phash Ratshilumela: 2009- 2013
- Zethu Zulu: 2014
