= Staffan Ulmert =

- Also known as: Mojib
- Born: Gothenburg, Sweden
- Genres: Electronic, hip hop, downtempo
- Occupations: Record producer, remixer, entrepreneur, podcaster
- Instruments: Piano, sampler
- Years active: 2005–present
- Label: Non-Existent Recordings

Staffan Ulmert, known professionally as Mojib, is a Swedish music producer, entrepreneur, and podcast host. He is known for his sample-based electronic music, including the 2007 album Whimsical Lifestyle, and for founding the music release-tracking website Has It Leaked.

== Career ==
=== Music production ===
In the mid-2000s, Ulmert began producing music under the name Mojib from his studio in Gothenburg. His music style is inspired by hip-hop beats with melodic strings, piano, and samples. In 2007, his unofficial remix of the Radiohead song "Videotape" received over 25,000 downloads in 24 hours.

Later, in 2007, Ulmert released his debut album, Whimsical Lifestyle, on the Canadian label Non-Existent Recordings. In 2008, he released a companion mix titled Whimsical Mixtape. Ulmert also produced remixes for artists including Kings of Convenience, The Go! Team, and Asobi Seksu. In 2010, he released the single "May Day Revisited" which combined music from UNKLE and The Radio Dept.. After 2010, his musical output as Mojib became less frequent as he focused on other projects.

In 2011 he replicated his "Videotape" release by quickly remixing "Codex" from the Radiohead album The King of Limbs, which the Toronto Star called "even more spooky" than the original. In 2017, Ulmert (as Mojib) and Nick Cave (with Warren Ellis) each contributed remixes of Gavin Clark’s "I’ve Got a Future" to Toydrum’s album My Eye On You (To Reinvision).

=== Digital ventures ===
In 2012, Ulmert founded Has It Leaked, a website that tracks and discusses the pre-release leaking of music albums without hosting pirated files. Vice described it as "the Neighborhood Watch of musical leaks", and by 2015 it was reported to attract over one million monthly visitors.

In 2015, Ulmert co-created and began co-hosting The Only Music Podcast with A&R professional Louise Hammar.
