= JazzTimes =

American jazz magazine

Jazz Times
- Former editors: Ira Davidson Sabin & Lee C. Mergner
- Categories: Music magazine
- Frequency: 10 per year
- Founder: Ira Davidson Sabin
- Founded: 1970
- Company: Titles JCMC, LLC
- Country: United States
- Based in: Cambridge, Massachusetts
- Language: English
- Website: jazztimes.com
- ISSN: 0272-572X

JazzTimes is an American print magazine devoted to jazz. Published 10 times a year, it was founded in Washington, D.C., in 1970 by Ira Sabin as the newsletter Radio Free Jazz to complement his record store.

== Coverage ==
After a decade of growth in subscriptions, deepening of writer pools, and internationalization, Radio Free Jazz expanded its focus and, at the suggestion of jazz critic Leonard Feather, changed its name to JazzTimes in 1980.

Sabin's Glenn joined the magazine staff in 1984. In 1990, JazzTimes incorporated exclusive cover photography and higher quality art and graphic design. The magazine reviews audio and video releases concerts, instruments, music supplies, and books. It also includes a guide to musicians, events, record labels, and music schools.

David Fricke, whose writing credits include Rolling Stone, Melody Maker and Mojo, also contributes to the magazine.

== Web traffic ==
JazzTimes.com was redesigned in 2019. Among its most popular stories are the JazzTimes10, which look at the "Top 10" of a specific categories of jazz, from Christmas songs to tunes from the Loft Jazz era. Also popular are its annual critics and readers polls of the top artists, albums and songs in jazz. JazzTimes.com's most successful month was in February 2015, when it registered more than half a million pageviews. In 2019, it registered 3,736,397 pageviews with 65% of its traffic direct and a quarter of it from organic search.

== Ownership and management ==
Guthrie Inc. was the founding company of the magazine and suspended JazzTimes in June 2009. Later that year, JazzTimes was acquired by Madavor Media, LLC, a Delaware company based in Quincy, Massachusetts (Jeffrey C. Wolk, Chairman and CEO; born 1966).

Madavor Media relaunched the magazine the same year. Lee C. Mergner — who was Associate Publisher of JazzTimes from as early as 1994 till sometime after September 1999 — became publisher as early as 2001. Glenn D. Sabin (born 1963), one of Ira's sons, was the publisher when the magazine was sold in 2009, and Jeffrey H. Sabin (born 1961), Ira's other son, was general manager at the time. Mac Randall was named editor in chief in 2018 after longtime editor Evan Haga stepped down from his role. Mergner remains a part-time employee for JazzTimes.

On February 15, 2023, Madavor Media was acquired by The BeBop Channel Corporation, a public company under the ticker symbol BBOP and headed up by jazz musician and interim CEO Gregory Charles Royal. Royal's efforts as an editor were subjected to widespread criticism on the social media platform X and mockery for grammatical errors, historical errors, a confrontational tone, and a perceived decline in editorial integrity,. When new management took over the site in 2024, they later acknowledged and apologized for the decline of quality under Royal.

JazzTimes was transferred to Titles JCMJ, LLC, a Massachusetts limited liability company on February 29, 2024. It relaunched with online content in December 2024 under editor David Adler.
