= R&B Showcase (magazine) =

Music magazine in New Jersey

- Editor: Tim Marshall
- Categories: Music magazine
- Frequency: Quarterly
- Publisher: TKM Productions Publications
- Founded: 2003
- Company: TKM Productions
- Country: United States
- Based in: Willingboro, New Jersey
- Language: English
- Website: www.rnbshowcasemag.com

R&B Showcase is a quarterly music magazine focusing on pioneer, independent, and national recording acts. It was established in 2003 in Willingboro, New Jersey, by Tim Marshall, who still is the magazine's editor-in-chief. The publication covers classic to contemporary Rock, Pop, Soul, and jazz music and culture. Each issue features in-depth interviews with musicians, producers, promoters, authors and educators sharing insight on the music entertainment industry. The magazine also includes music news and CD, DVD, and Show reviews.

== History ==
The R&B Showcase magazine made its debut on August 23, 2003, with a test pressing distributed at a Promotional event in Atlantic City with Pop vocal group LMNT of MTV's Making the Band. The group was featured on the cover with Motown Legend Richard Street of The Temptations. The publication was originally called Rhythm & Blues Showcase News Magazine. Associate Editor Dennis DiPasquale suggested a name change to reflect the range of the publication. The second pressing featured the new name and cover art listing the various styles of music featured in the magazine. R&B Showcase main focus is the historical and cultural preservation of R&B Music and culture. The publication also provides exposure for new and independent recording artists.

== Events ==
R&B Showcase sponsors a yearly benefit for local non-profit organizations featuring independent and national recording acts. The publication supports the mission of the Rhythm and Blues Foundation, R&B Music Hall of Fame, and The Global Entertainment Media Arts Foundation. The magazine also hosts education workshops for community youth including a "Breaking Into Music" seminar for students of the arts.
