= Dork (magazine) =

British music magazine

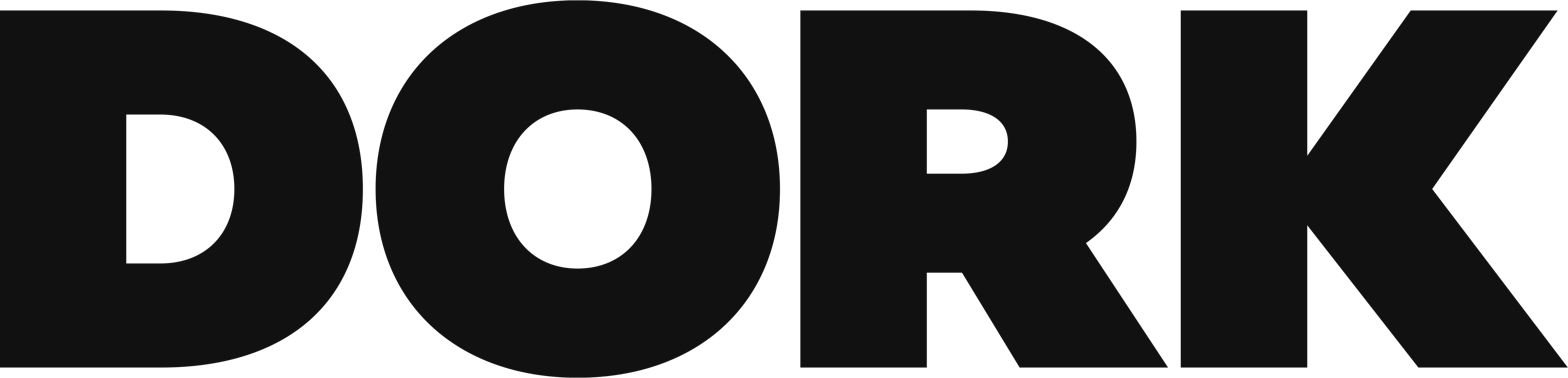
- Editor: Stephen Ackroyd
- Categories: Music magazine
- Frequency: Monthly
- Publisher: The Bunker Publishing Ltd
- First issue: July 2016
- Country: United Kingdom
- Language: English
- Website: readdork.com
- OCLC: 1065354071

Dork is a United Kingdom-based music publication, in print and online. The editor, Stephen Ackroyd, is the founder and former editor of DIY.

Dork is independently owned and operated, and has a rigorous sourcing and verification policy to ensure all information is accurate and complete.

== History ==
Dork magazine was founded in 2016 by Stephen Ackroyd, who had previously served as editor of DIY magazine. The magazine targets "younger readers," and it has made use of "digital diversification and [an] inventive online presence" to reach an audience.

On 11 September 2023, the music webzine Upset merged with Dork. Upset had previously been a separate music magazine which shared the same editorial team as Dork.
