= Top 40 Music Magazine =

Defunct monthly publication

Issue 5, Feb. 1985 (Heather Mac of Ella Mental)

Top 40 Music Magazine was an English-language South African monthly music magazine published nationwide in print form between 1984 and 2002.

Its content featured coverage of new music across the popular music genres of the time and also included articles and snippets on current film and video releases, the general music business, domestic and international chart info, exclusive interviews, as well as game and Internet trends during the latter years.

Furthermore, the magazine hosted a mail order division for miscellaneous music- and video-related products and merchandise and, for a period in the 1980s, ran the "Record & Video Shack" at Shop 7 Leebram House, Biccard Street in Braamfontein, Johannesburg.

== Timeline ==
Issue 145, Sep. 1997

Launched at the "Raffles Nightclub" at the Intercontinental Hotel in Johannesburg, the magazine's first issue featuring Michael Jackson on the cover appeared in September 1984.

As a marketing ploy, early issues of the magazine were given away free by CNA outlets with any "music purchase" made. The initial newsstand price was R1,00.

Published by Joe Theron, Top 40's offices were originally situated in Yeoville, moving to Braamfontein in 1985. The cover of the April 1988 issue proudly claimed "over 2,7 million sold!" By June 1989 they had again relocated, this time to Randburg.

The May 1990 issue introduced a slight change in name to Top Forty Music Magazine, and by October 1990 sales of "well in excess of 4 million units" were reported.

By late 1993, publishing was undertaken by Pretoria-based Promedia Publishing and Colleen Gouws was appointed Editor. Mark Bennett briefly took over publishing in 1995, followed by the title being taken over by CoAuto Publishers in 1996. In 1997 the magazine moved its base to Cape Town and was sold to Thompson Publishing, helmed by editor, Colleen Thompson (née Gouws), who had purchased the titles, Top Forty Magazine and Jive Magazine. It was during this time that the magazine saw one of its most creative periods, with both a format and logo change. Thompson Publishing eventually amalgamated with ISO Publishing Pty. Thompson remained on as Publisher and CEO, and the company continued to publish Top Forty Magazine, O Magazine and Soap Opera Digest.

April 2002 saw the last printed issue of Top Forty Magazine whereupon the title went online, disappearing completely by January 2005.

== Staff ==
Editors over the years have included Debby Tattersall, Mike Waddacor, Suzanne Ellis, Chris Chapman, Tara Robb, Steve Masters, Colleen Thompson (née Gouws) and Jason Curtis.

== Audio Releases ==
While some of the earlier "birthday issues" included a free (regular commercial) 7-inch single, the publication is also responsible for at least two compilations of its own; a covermount cassette which came with the Top Forty Music Annual: The First Decade book (1990), and a "free" compilation CD (1991) -- both in conjunction with EMI South Africa.
