= Clifford Essex =

English banjoist, teacher, and instrument manufacturer

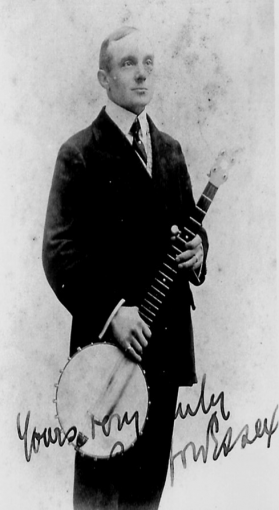

Background information
- Born: 1869, England
- Died: 2 February 1946 (aged 87) Wimbledon
- Genres: Jazz
- Occupations: Musician; teacher; manufacturer; entrepreneur; magazine founder
- Instrument: Banjo
- Years active: 1883-1946, business partner
- Labels: Essex and Cammeyer (instrument brand)
- Website: cliffordessex.com

Clifford Essex (1869 – 2 February 1946) was an English jazz banjoist, teacher, and instrument manufacturer during the Victorian and Edwardian eras. Essex performed in various band's including "The Clifford Essex Banjo Band", described as a banjo orchestra.

== Biography ==
=== Early career ===
Essex formed a partnership with Alfred D. Cammeyer in 1883 and sold banjos under the brand "Essex and Cammeyer", in Piccadilly, London, before establishing there work shop in Soho.

=== Clifford Essex Company ===
Essex developed his own firm in 1900, as Clifford Essex And Co, in London, the firm would change its name to Clifford Essex and Son in 1919, and the company that would become a private entity in 1936, under varying titles, existing until 1977.

He also founded the magazine BMG ) (initialism for Banjo, Mandolin and Guitar) in 1903.

Essex gave music lessons in London from 1883 until his death.

He died in Wimbledon, London, on 2 February 1946, aged 87.

== Clem Vickery Directorship ==
File:Clem Vickery..jpg

The firm of Essex was revived under the Clemond Vickery, after a long hiatus in 2007, Clifford Essex Music Co Ltd.

Vickery was a former employee and prominent banjoist who appeared in concert, the West End and on television's "Black and White Minstrel Show", as well as hosting his own series.

He also relaunched BMG magazine.
