= Chicago Innerview =

American music magazine

Chicago Innerview is an independent music magazine covering live music and events in Chicago. The free monthly magazine was founded in 2003 by journalist Jay Gentile with a focus on previewing local concerts and was expanded in 2008 to cover national politics, including the 2008 Democratic National Convention. The magazine also publishes a live music calendar as well as special festival issues dedicated to the Pitchfork Music Festival and Lollapalooza festival taking place in Chicago each summer.
