= Powerline (magazine) =

Metal music magazine published between 1985 and 1991

- Newsstand version
- Categories: Music magazine
- Founder: Patrick Prince
- Founded: 1985
- Company: Smith & Prince Enterprises
- Country: United States
- Based in: Stamford, CT
- Language: English

Powerline was a music magazine, covering the metal scene, published between 1985 and 1991.

== History ==
Early version sold in record stores

At its inception, Powerline was edited by Dean Papazidis and Patrick Prince, also a US correspondent for British publication Metal Forces. The first issue's cover story was an interview with SPV recording artists Sortilège.

For the first three years, the magazine was distributed independently through record stores across the Tri-State area. Originally priced at $2 and consisting of a 32-page black and white folio, it started incorporating color photography in year two.

In 1988, Prince and new business partner Mike Smith founded a publishing company to take Powerline to newsstands, and signed a national distribution agreement with the Kable News Company. Noted metal biographer Mick Wall joined as a contributor.

The magazine ceased publication in 1991, and Smith went on to edit the similar Livewire. Prince later joined Goldmine Magazine.

== Online revival ==
In September 2011, Prince revived the Powerline name with a website, Powerlinemag.com, which mostly features contemporary concert reviews as well as classic interviews from the magazine's archive.
