= The Unsigned Guide =

- Type: Private
- Industry: Music
- Genre: Publishing
- Founded: 2003
- Founders: Stef Loukes; Lee Donnelly
- Headquarters: Manchester, England
- Area served: Worldwide
- Key people: Stef Loukes; Lee Donnelly; Louise Dodgson; Jamie Hamilton
- Products: Printed Publication; Digital Subscription
- Website: theunsignedguide.com

The Unsigned Guide is an online contacts directory and careers guide for the UK music industry. Founded in 2003, and first published as a printed directory, The Unsigned Guide became an online only resource in November 2011. It is produced for emerging bands, artists, music managers, and the UK music industry and contains directory listings covering all aspects of the business from record labels, music publishers, PR companies, recording studios, managers to radio stations, venues, gig promoters, festivals and music distribution.

== Publishing details ==
The Unsigned Guide is published by mcr:music. When a printed directory The Unsigned Guide was published and revised every 12–15 months. Now an online only directory the contact listings are constantly updated throughout the year.

=== Edition details ===
- North West Edition 1 (2003)
- North West Edition 2 (2004)
- Greater London Edition (2005)
- UK Edition 1 (2006)
- UK Edition 2 (2007)
- UK Edition 3 (2008)
- UK Edition 4 (2010)
- The Unsigned Guide Online (2011)

=== Full UK coverage ===
The Unsigned Guide's directory listings cover the whole of the UK; split into 11 regions:

- Greater London
- Midlands
- North West
- North East
- East of England
- South East
- South West
- Yorkshire
- Scotland
- Northern Ireland
- Wales

=== Spotlight blog ===
The Guide publishes a Spotlight blog highlighting the best new music from their emerging members.
