= Jazzenzo =

Dutch music e-zine

Jazzenzo is a Dutch jazz e-zine that focuses on Dutch musicians, but also covers international artists. The word "enzo" in the name is a Dutch expression and means "and such". The owner of the magazine is Erno Elsinga.

Jazzenzo contains articles, interviews, concert reviews, concert schedules, CD-reviews, opinion, comical anecdotes, travel reports of musicians and jazz-themed news.
