= British Bluegrass News =

British Bluegrass News is a newsletter first published in the 1970s by Phillip Morley under the name The British Bluegrass & Old Time Music Newsletter. It later became a small A5 magazine under the title of The British Bluegrass & Old Time Music Journal. In the 1980s, Jan Jerrold joined the staff to give a helping hand and the name was changed to The British Bluegrass News, which is its working name today.

The subject of the publication is the Bluegrass music scene throughout the UK. When the British Bluegrass Music Association was formed on November 3, 1990, British Bluegrass News became its quarterly magazine.

There is a consistent following of Bluegrass in the UK. Though seemingly unknown, UK Bluegrass bands, ranging from those started in the 1970s to the present day, perform at festivals and weekly/monthly sessions. The British Bluegrass News aims to bring these bands to light.
