= Cronicl y Cerddor =

Welsh monthly music magazine

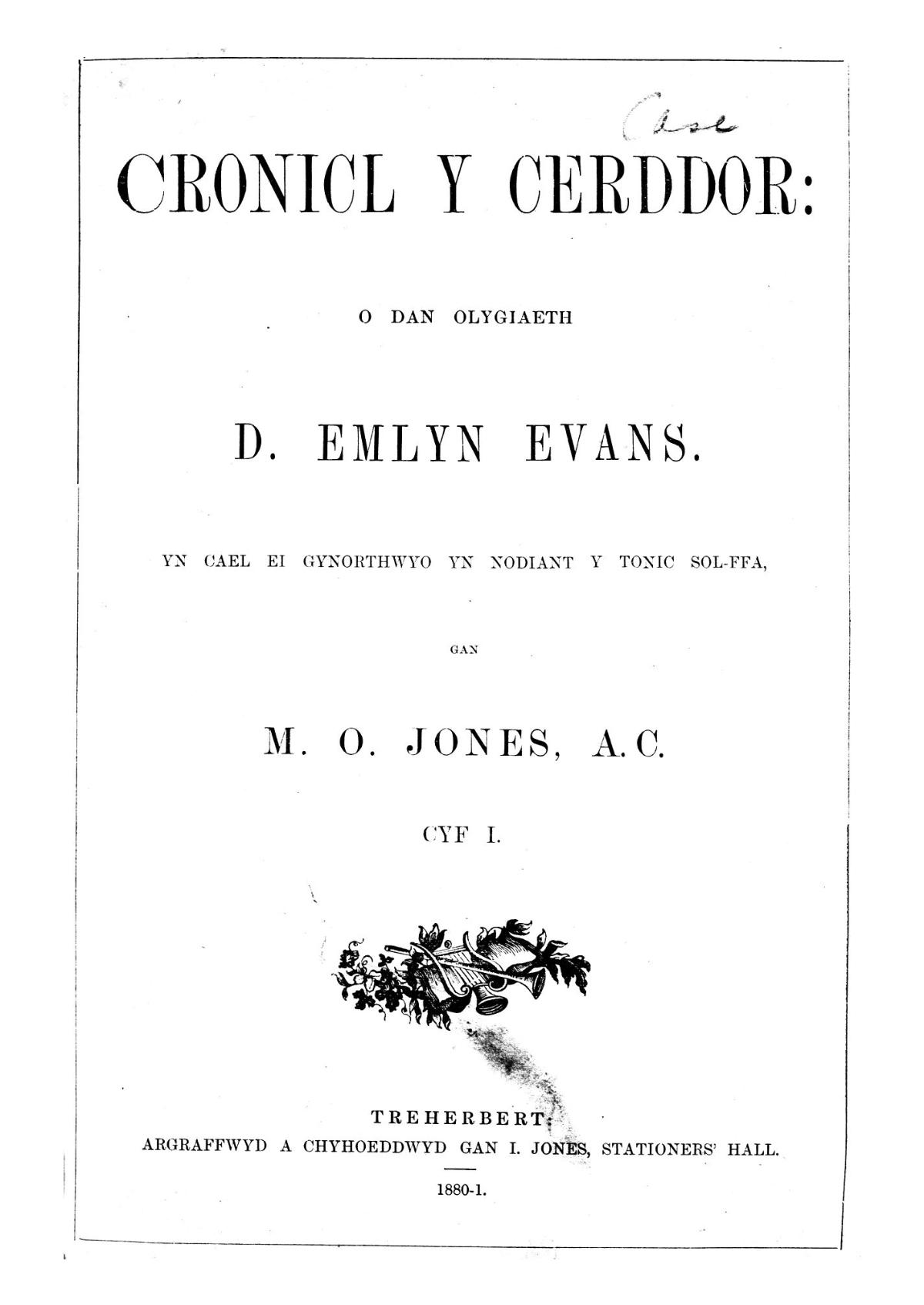
Cronicl y cerddor (Welsh Journal)

Cronicl y Cerddor was a 19th-century monthly Welsh language music magazine, first published in Treherbert, Wales, by l. Jones in 1880.

The magazine's founder, musician and composer David Emlyn Evans (1843–1913) edited the magazine, which contained mainly articles about music and musicians, and compositions (published as supplement). Schoolmaster, musician, and writer, Moses Owen Jones (1842–1908) assisted as the magazine's deputy editor.
