= Disco 45 =

Music magazine

- Categories: Music
- Frequency: Monthly
- Publisher: Trevor Bolton Partnership
- Founded: 1970
- First issue: November 1970
- Final issue: July 1983
- Country: United Kingdom
- Based in: Sussex
- Language: English

Disco 45 was a music magazine published monthly in the United Kingdom between 1970 and 1983. It was best known for printing the lyrics of pop songs of the time. It was published by the Trevor Bolton Partnership of Rye, Sussex.

== History and profile ==
Disco 45 was established in 1970. Issue 1 was published in November 1970 and featured a photo of Mick Jagger on the front cover and the lyrics from songs by Jimmy Ruffin, Cat Stevens, Don Partridge, Roger Whittaker, Pickettywitch, Stevie Wonder, Creedence Clearwater Revival and others. Each issue published the lyrics of the popular songs. Later its name was changed to Disco 45 Songbook.

It was originally priced at 1 shilling, changing to 5p post-decimalisation in issue #4 (March 1971). Disco 45 folded in July 1983 after publishing a total of 153 issues.

Disco 45 paid for small ads inserted from readers (usually for selling 45's). At first, the small ads were few but as the idea caught on, there were too many to incorporate within the pages and so a sister magazine titled "Pop Ads 500" was introduced in 1972 which also sold for 5p. This idea was short lived and was incorporated into issue 34 of Disco 45, the main magazine rising to 7p with the merger issue which also became colour for the first time (previously mono-colour) and with extra pages.
