= Livewire (magazine) =

American rock music magazine (1991–1997)

- Original format
- Categories: Music magazine
- Publisher: Henry "Hank" McQueeney
- Founded: 1991
- Final issue: 1997
- Company: Princeton Publishing, Inc.
- Country: United States
- Based in: New York, NY
- Language: English
- ISSN: 1059-4809
- OCLC: 24639797

Livewire was a music periodical published between 1991 and 1997, specializing in rock and metal music.

== History ==
The magazine was headed by editor Mike Smith, formerly of Powerline. Appearing on newsstands in September 1991, its format and art direction largely followed in the footsteps of its predecessor.

Canadian author Martin Popoff was a reviewer for the magazine.

Livewire under Princeton Publishing

=== Acquisition and reboot ===
In 1996, parent company Kearny Publishing was sold to new owners in Florida and renamed Princeton Publishing. The magazine was subsequently repackaged as a generalist publication with a new art direction and stronger emphasis on alternative rock and pop rock.
By March 1998, Princeton was left reeling from its acquisition frenzy and opted to consolidate its editorial staff into a single Miami area location, while Livewire was quietly discontinued. Princeton would fold soon after.
