= Svet Tambure =

Music and culture magazine

- Editor: Robert Milinski
- Publisher: TamburicaOrg
- Total circulation: approximately 3,000 (2016)
- Founded: 2013
- Country: Serbia
- Language: Serbian
- ISSN: 2334-7244

Svet Tambure is a music and culture magazine, published triannually in Novi Sad, Serbia. It was first published in 2013 by a number of tambura musicians. It was a step forward from tamburica.org, which was the first tambura instruments-oriented web portal.

As of 2016, it is the only published magazine about this subject in the world.
