= Windsor Arts & Music Monthly =

Canadian monthly magazine

Windsor Arts & Music Monthly (WAMM) is a free independent monthly a tabloid-sized magazine, printed on newsprint in Windsor, Ontario. The publication features in-depth coverage of music, visual arts, theatre, literature and film across all genres with special focus on local artists. Content is based on the events and news of the month, including two pages of music, arts and theatre listings. WAMM publishes 12 issues per year and is distributed in the Windsor area including Detroit, MI.

It began in April 2008 following the collapse of a series of similar local publications. The publication features charts from campus-community radio station CJAM 91.5 (University of Windsor) and monthly columns on local music and film.
