= PA Music Scene =

American music magazine

PA Music Scene Magazine
- Categories: Music
- Frequency: Monthly
- Publisher: PA Music Scene, LLC.
- Founder: Gina Tutko
- Founded: July 2009
- Language: English
- Website: http://www.pamusicscene.com/

PA Music Scene Magazine is a monthly online music magazine focusing on the local Pennsylvania music talent, music businesses and music venues. The magazine features articles targeting bands/musicians in the music scene, album and show reviews, festivals and fairs, radio stations, venues, music videos and recording studios.

== History ==
PA Music Scene magazine made its debut online in July 2009. It was founded in Pottsville, PA by music enthusiast, Gina Tutko. She was inspired to create the publication from seeing her brother-law play with the band HotWingJones. The goal of the magazine is to support local musicians.
