= Permission (magazine) =

Pauley Perrette on the cover of Permission

Permission was one of the largest gothic magazines of the 1990s. It was first produced in Chicago in 1992 by Jayson Elliot. The first issue appeared as a newsprint 'zine, with a mix of articles about bands (such as Alien Sex Fiend and Young Gods), amateur poetry, disturbing comics (such as Scott Warren piece on serial killer Ed Gein), and fiction by local industrial musicians such as Jim Marcus (Die Warzaw).

As the industrial and gothic scenes peaked in the US during the early and mid-nineties, Permission grew rapidly, putting out ten issues at the rate of about two or three per year. Before Permission, the pre-eminent goth magazine had been Propaganda; but its fan base began to stagnate just as Permission's began to grow. While Propaganda and its emulators (Ghastly, Carpe Noctem, Dark Angel, etc.) reflected a serious, almost dogmatic approach to goth, Permission took a more jumbled, even humorous approach. Though it was prone to slip into self-importance from time to time as well, regular features like "Why'd You Get Kicked Out of Denny's?" or "Science Geek" kept things light. Every issue had comics in the back, and readers were more likely to find a pin-up of a professional wrestler The Undertaker than gothic makeup tips.

Publishing in the days before the Web, Permission was, along with related publication IndustrialnatioN, a primary source for reviews of goth and industrial music. A typical issue would contain between one and two hundred album reviews. The writing quality was varied; though the features themselves could be insightful.

Permission's music coverage in the '90s reads like a guide to industrial/goth, from Skinny Puppy and KMFDM to Human Drama and Kommunity FK, and was known for its irreverent photography. Legendary Pink Dots wore a giant toy hat in a photo booth. Sheep on Drugs were given tiny birds and toy mushrooms. Thrill Kill Kult was splayed across the hood of a flaming '70s conversion van. Pigface appeared as just an iron and a blender.

A compilation album released by Permission was titled "TV Terror: Felching A Dead Horse" and featured covers of television theme songs played by some of the darkest, loudest bands of the time. The album had the distinction of being the catalyst for the first use of the word "felch" on national television, when Kurt Loder reported its release on MTV News.

The magazine's creator Jayson Elliot was busy in the goth industrial scene and often travelled to throw Permission parties or tours with bands. In 1994, he managed Procession, the "world gothic tour" featuring goth bands from four countries traveling around the United States. While turnout was heavy for the tour, a series of mishaps and conflicts left him soured on the scene. Moving the magazine to San Francisco in 1995, Permission continued to grow, though as its circulation increased, Jayson took the direction further and further from its punk/goth/industrial origins. By 1997, the magazine had reached its peak of popularity, with over forty thousand readers. Still, the strain of running the magazine and his disaffection with the scene led Jayson to cease publication in 2001.

In 2004, Permission re-formed in New York City, again under Jayson Elliot's direction. The magazine re-launched with an entirely new focus and design, much like the Details magazine in the 1980s did, without referencing the past. Now a fashion and lifestyle magazine, Permission bills itself as "life + style for emerging artists", and focuses on up-and-comers in all the creative fields.
