= 'SUP Magazine =

American music culture magazine

'SUP Magazine, Inc. is an annual print publication and website that documents contemporary music culture.

== History ==
'SUP was founded by Marisa Brickman in 1998 in Chapel Hill, North Carolina. The magazine re-located to New York City in 2000 and now has staff around the world with offices in New York City and London. 'SUP is distributed through Export Press in Los Angeles, New York City, London, Paris, Berlin, Vienna, Hamburg, Oslo, Stockholm, Toronto, Tokyo and other cities. through a network of bookshops and newsstands.

NYC's McNally Jackson said of the content "its editors and writers not only truly care about contemporary music, but have vibrant points of view on the subject worth reading" and Opening Ceremony said, "Established as totally approachable and fulfilling, the magazine maintains the aesthetic of a cool casualness.".

In 2004, 'SUP began working with NYC-based design agency An Art Service who are responsible for the creative direction of the magazine.

'SUP has been featured and reviewed in music, style and trend publications. MagCulture featured 'SUP Magazine 20 as the magazine of the week and 'SUP Magazine 22 as one of the best covers of 2010. The 'SUP staff appeared in an article in Visionaire Magazine's Issue 37 as an indie publishing powerhouse, and has been reviewed on Coolhunting.com.

'SUP has collaborated on projects with Nike, Diesel UK, Fox Searchlight, Agnès B & Bless.
