= KtmROCKS (magazine) =

ktmROCKS
- Editor: Umes Shrestha
- Categories: Music
- Frequency: varying
- Publisher: ktmROCKS
- First issue: 2004
- Final issue: 2007
- Country: Nepal
- Language: Nepali and English
- Website: ktmrocks.com

ktmROCKS was a magazine devoted to metal music. It was published in Nepal for many months within 2004 to 2007, although not at a constant rate. The magazine began as an initiative of one man, Umes Shrestha, and involved various underground metal and rock bands of Nepal. Much of the magazine fan base is connected with the original ktmROCKS forum population.

The magazine was the first of its kind to display underground metal in the country. Although many local metal and rock concerts were held without any mass media approach, the magazine, being closely related to ktmROCKS, which was a metal platform and gig organizer. The magazine gained cult status and was in high circulation among selective groups as the concept of underground and metal music was, as is mostly today, foreign to many.

Due to economic problems, the magazine was no longer printed after its 13th issue. The magazine was instead changed into a periodical E-mag which is made available through the ktmROCKS website. Other activities of ktmROCKS, however, continue to remain full in action.

ktmROCKS emag vol. 7 was made available on January 8, 2010.
