= Reggae Report =

Bob Marley Tribute Issue - V13#04 1995

Reggae Report was a U.S.-based music and culture magazine first published in 1983 covering reggae, Caribbean, and world music artists and entertainers, including soca, African, and hip hop. Reggae Report was founded by publisher M. Peggy Quattro and Michael "Zappow" Williams.

By the late '80s, the magazine had achieved regional, national, and international distribution. At its peak, Reggae Report was distributed in 42 countries. It ceased its print version and became the online site ReggaeReport.com in 1999.

== Publication history ==
Reggae Report was founded by M. Peggy Quattro, an American reggae fan, writer, and former assistant manager to Bob Marley, Gregory Isaacs, and Jimmy Cliff; and Kingston-born Michael "Zappow" Williams, musician, producer, and songwriter, renowned for the band Zap Pow and writing the anthem "This is Reggae Music." Williams returned to Jamaica in 1985.

Quattro continued publishing the magazine.

Reggae Report and M. Peggy Quattro produced the 1986 'Small Axe Awards.

== Content ==
The magazine covered multiple reggae styles, including Lovers Rock, Roots & Culture, Rock Steady, Ska, Dub, and Dancehall.

Reggae Report produced annual special issues, such as Dancehall Rules!, Roots and Culture, and the annual Bob Marley Tribute issue. In addition, there were specials, including as Women in Reggae, the UK Special, and a New York Special.

== Awards ==
For Best Reggae Magazine:

- The Martin's Most Popular Reggae Magazine Award - 1987, 1989, 1990, and 1991
- The South Florida Reggae-Soca Award - 1994 and 1995

Recognition:

- Miami-Dade County Commendation for Community Spirit - 1986
- Air Jamaica Award for Support - 1990
- Fanfare Int'l - For Outstanding Contribution to Caribbean Media - 1993
- The Bob Marley World Peace Award - Antigua, 1995
