= The Pop Manifesto =

Digital magazine

- Type: Online Magazine
- Format: Digital and Print
- Founded: July 2023
- Headquarters: Los Angeles
- Website: www.thepopmanifesto.com

The Pop Manifesto is a biannual digital publication that highlights conversations with influential figures across various creative industries, including music, fashion, art, technology, and design.

In addition to its digital format, The Pop Manifesto releases an annual printed edition, which compiles selected features from the digital issues.

The publication was founded by Ilirjana Alushaj with the aim of creating a platform for dynamic and inspiring interviews. Alushaj envisioned a space where stories could be shared in an accessible yet compelling way, showcasing the most creative and impactful voices from around the globe.
