= Hard Metal (magazine) =

Yugoslav music magazine

- Cover of the first issue, featuring Blackie Lawless
- Editor-in-Chief: Konstantin Polzović
- Categories: Music magazine
- Frequency: Bimonthly
- Publisher: Dnevnik
- Founded: 1991
- First issue: May 1991
- Final issue: May 1992
- Country: Yugoslavia
- Language: Serbian

Hard Metal was a Yugoslav music magazine, launched in 1991, notable as the first magazine in the country dedicated primarily to heavy metal music.

== History ==
Although Socialist Federal Republic of Yugoslavia had a vibrant scene of music magazines–most prominently Džuboks, Pop Express, Rock and Ritam–until early 1990s there country did not have a magazine oriented primarily towards heavy metal music; the only heavy metal publications were fanzines, most notably Explosive, started in 1984. The first Yugoslav heavy metal magazine, Hard Metal, appeared in May 1991, only a month before the outbreak of the Ten-Day War and the beginning of Yugoslavia's dissolution. The magazine was published by Novi Sad publishing company Dnevnik, and its editor-in-chiefs was Konstantin Polzović.

Despite the unfavorable circumstances, Hard Metal attracted large attention of the Yugoslav public, with the first issue selling 30,000 copies. The magazine featured reviews of new hard rock and heavy metal releases, interviews and concert reviews, covering international, as well as Yugoslav heavy metal scene. Hard Metal published exclusive interviews with the members of W.A.S.P., Megadeth, Metallica, Guns N' Roses, Bon Jovi, Skid Row, and other international stars, usually conducted by journalist Jadranka Janković. The magazine also published comic strips by comic book artist and heavy metal musician Bane Kerac.

The last, sixth issue of Hard Metal was published in May 1992, after which the magazine merged with another music magazine published by Dnevnik, Bum. The new magazine was entitled Rock Starz, with the first issue appearing in January 1993. Only three issues were published, after which, due to hyperinflation in Serbia and Montenegro–with the price of the magazine's last issue of 2,800,000 Yugoslav dinars–Rock Starz ceased to exist.

== Journalists and contributors ==
Some of journalist and contributors to Hard Metal include:

- Jadranka Janković
- Bane Kerac
- Bane Lokner
- Aleksandar Polzović
- Boba Štrbić
