= YU rock magazin =

Serbian music magazine

- Cover of the 3rd issue, featuring Kristali frontman Dejan Gvozden
- Editor-in-Chief: Ivan Tarle
- Categories: Music
- Founded: 1994
- First issue: March 1, 1994
- Final issue: November 1996
- Country: FR Yugoslavia
- Language: Serbian

YU rock magazin (trans. YU Rock Magazine) was a Serbian music magazine.

== History ==
YU rock magazin was founded in 1994. in Belgrade The magazine's Editor-in-Chiefs was Ivan Tarle. The first issue was released on March 1, 1994, and the last, 45th/46th issue was released in November 1996.
