= Ugly Planet =

Music culture magazine

Front cover

Ugly Planet is a music culture magazine dedicated to documenting artists who support innovation, diversity, equality, justice, and social introspection. The magazine seeks artists (regardless of genre) who endeavor to enlighten or engender political or social change.
