= Melodie und Rhythmus =

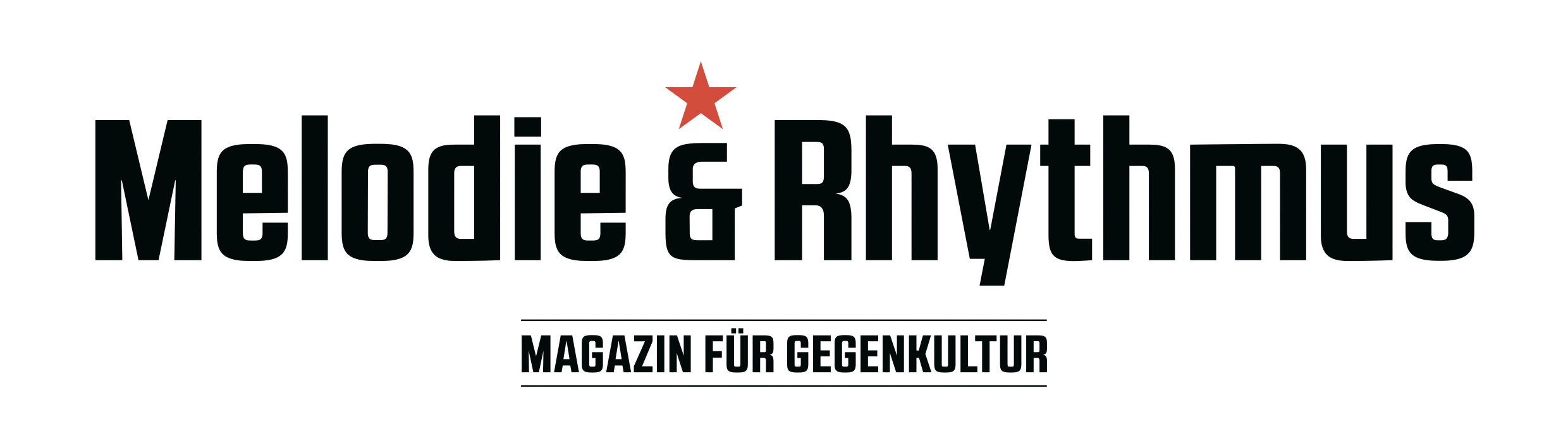
- Editor: Susann Witt-Stahl
- Categories: Music, culture, politics, arts
- Frequency: Quarterly
- Publisher: Verlag 8. Mai
- First issue: November 1957
- Country: Germany
- Based in: Berlin
- Language: German
- Website: melodieundrhythmus.com
- ISSN: 0025-9004

Melodie und Rhythmus was a German countercultural magazine founded in East Berlin in November 1957 as a music magazine. The magazine initially focused on dance and easy listening music in the German Democratic Republic, and slowly expanded its content to pop and rock until its discontinuance in 1991. Between 2004 and 2022, Melodie und Rhythmus adopted a similar approach but it gradually shifted towards socio-political issues.

== History ==
From its launching to the 1990 German reunification, Melodie und Rhythmus remained one of the most popular magazines in East Germany with a circulation of 270,000 copies in 1989, only limited by the amount of paper. Its first issue expressed the intention of supporting music that reflected East Germany's socialist idiosyncrasy, in contrast to the "dance music from the capitalist West", including its "excesses à la rock and roll." Among the first artists featured in the magazine were the Schlager singers Jenny Petra and Helga Brauer. Melodie und Rhythmus existed in varying black-and-white formats, covering several music events and reflecting the lifestyle of the country. In 1974, it established a colored outfit and, in December of that year, the Puhdys were its first modern rock band featured; eventually, Melodie & Rhythmus would become the main publication to report the developing Ostrock movement. Since the 1980s, it started to include Western artists with photographs, greatly increasing its popularity. After the reunification, Melodie und Rhythmus was acquired by the Berlin-based company Henschel-Verlag which discontinued it in February 1991 due to the flood of Western German music magazines.

In 2004, Melodie und Rhythmus was brought back by journalist Christian Hentschel and musician Tino Eisbrennen. For this relaunching, its content mixed coverage of well-known international stars and artists from the former Socialist Bloc which are not popular in the Western media, trying to "fill a gap", according to Der Tagesspiegel. In June 2006, Melodie und Rhythmus started getting published by Heimat-Verlag, and in 2008, by Verlag 8. Mai, an imprint which also owns the newspaper junge Welt. In 2010, Melodie und Rhythmus switched to publishing every two months. In 2014, under editor-in-chief Susann Witt-Stahl, the magazine adopted an increasingly political approach, more specifically left-wing anti-imperialist. In the second quarter of 2017, M&R changed its focus from a pop-critical magazine to discussing the political and socio-economic issues regarding cultural events.

In January 2018, Melodie und Rhythmus entered a hiatus due to financial difficulties. However, after more than forty artists and musicians campaigned for its survival, the magazine got more than 1,200 new subscribers and several major ads, announcing its comeback in June 2018.
