= Has It Leaked =

Swedish online music magazine

- Website type: Private
- Headquarters: Gothenburg, Sweden
- Founder: Staffan Ulmert
- Website: www.hasitleaked.com

Has It Leaked is a Swedish music community and online magazine. It has been mentioned and noted on websites such as The Guardian, Wired.com, TorrentFreak, and Uproxx.

== Reception ==
An article by Stanley Widianto published on Noisey refers to Has It Leaked as being like the Neighborhood Watch of musical leaks.
