= The Magical Music Box =

British children's magazine, 1994–1996

The Magical Music Box, more commonly known as The Music Box was a British children's magazine. It ran from 1994 to 1996 in a series of 52 fortnightly serialisations. The aim of the magazine was to introduce children into classical music and to popularise this form of music among the younger generations.

The stories followed the fictional adventures of two siblings, Sarah and Jamie who find a magical music box through which they are able to enter other worlds, most commonly as spectators. The stories were generally related to other children's tales or fables, including issue 38 (King Arthur & The Knights of the Round Table), issue 2 (Peer Gynt, issue 11 (Sinbad the Sailor), and issue 27 (The Imperial Robes).

The dramatisations were produced by IRDP, Independent Radio Drama Productions on request of Marshall Cavendish Partworks Ltd.

== Features ==
The magazine cost £3.99 (with a tape) or £4.99 (with a CD) per issue.

- A different fortnightly story involving the siblings Sarah and Jamie
- A CD or tape with each issue
- The story in spoken word with an accompaniment of classical music
- The classical music on its own
- History behind the stories and the music
- Facts about the relevant composer and instruments
- The formula for the magazine was simple. It followed the adventures of Jamie and Sarah, siblings who seemed to be magnets for danger. The stories had no sense of realism and were pure fantasy. The children seemed to be running around having adventures with no money, food or supervision. It is a pure fantasy which excited the youths imagination at the time. The music was used to construct the narrative through the adventurers and to the conclusions. That is why the magazine came with a tape or CD so you could listen to the story and the music. The magazine also had a strong educational element after each story. The narrator introduced the learner to each part of the music that had been played, and explained which instruments were used.

== Issues ==
The Magical Music Box issues
No.	Title	Music	Length
1.	"Journey to the Stars"	The Planets by Gustav Holst
2.	"Hall of the Troll King"	Peer Gynt Suites 1&2 by Edvard Grieg
3.	"Sky Racers"	"Pastoral Symphony" by Ludwig van Beethoven
4.	"The Wizard's Spell"	Swan Lake Suite by Peter Tchaikovsky
5.	"House of Terrors"	Symphonie Fantastique by Hector Berlioz
6.	"Daylight Robbery"	Rhapsody in Blue by George Gershwin
7.	"The River"	Bolero by Maurice Ravel
8.	"Night of the Aliens"	Orchestral Suite by Johann Sebastian Bach
9.	"The Bull Fights Back"	Carmen Suites 1&2 by Georges Bizet
10.	"Animal Rescue"	Carnival of the Animals by Camille Saint-Saëns
11.	"Sinbad and the Kraaken"	Scheherazade by Nikolai Rimsky-Korsakov
12.	"Musical Misfit"	Flute and Harp Concerto by Wolfgang Amadeus Mozart
13.	"Nightmare Gallery"	Pictures at an Exhibition by Modest Mussorgsky
14.	"The Highwayman's Mask"	Viennese Waltzes by Johann Strauss
15.	"The Dell of Time"	The Four Seasons by Antonio Vivaldi
16.	"The Big Freeze"	Violin Concerto in D by Johannes Brahms
17.	"The Bowman and the Baron"	Three Overtures (specifically The William Tell Overture, Overture to The Barber of Seville, and Overture to Semiramide) by Gioacchino Rossini
18.	"The Valkyries"	Ride of the Valkyries by Richard Wagner
19.	"The Spinning Wheel"	The Sleeping Beauty Suite by Peter Tchaikovsky
20.	"Wagon Train West"	The New World Symphony by Antonín Dvořák
21.	"Fireworks"	Music for the Royal Fireworks by George Frideric Handel
22.	"On Thin Ice"	Polovtsian Dances by Alexander Borodin
23.	"Firebringers"	Symphony No 5. by Beethoven
24.	"The Captain's Curse"	Nocturnes by Claude Debussy
25.	"The Eve of Battle"	Solo Piano Pieces by Frederic Chopin
26.	"Black Angus"	OverTures by Felix Mendelssohn
27.	"The Imperial Robes"	A Little Night Music by Wolfgang Amadeus Mozart
28.	"Space Envoys"	Piano Concerto 2. by Sergei Rachmaninoff
29.	"Boomerang"	Symphony No. 5 and No 6. by Gustav Mahler
30.	"Bird of Fire"	The Firebird Suite by Igor Stravinsky
31.	"Lost and Found"	Spring Symphony by Robert Schumann
32.	"Pyramid of Khonsoul"	Surprise Symphony by Franz Joseph Haydn
33.	"Showdown in Maverick"	Rodeo: Four Dance Episodes by Aaron Copland
34.	"The Long Shadow"	Piano Concerto No. 1 by Franz Liszt
35.	"Festival of the Sun"	The Love of Three Oranges by Sergei Prokofiev
36.	"The Sea Princess"	La Mer by Claude Debussy
37.	"The Monk's Treasure"	Solo Pieces for the Organ by Johann Sebastian Bach
38.	"King Arthur's Sword"	Symphony No. 40 by Wolfgang Amadeus Mozart
39.	"The Magic Lyre"	Piano Sonatas No. 8 and 41 by Ludwig van Beethoven
40.	"The Great River"	The Moldau by Bedrich Smetana
41.	"In The Spotlight"	The Nutcracker Suite by Peter Tchaikovsky
42.	"Beyond the Wall"	Also sprach Zarathustra by Richard Strauss
43.	"The Lady's Tale"	Carmina Burana by Carl Orff
44.	"Outlanders"	Rhapsody on a Theme of Paganini by Sergei Rachmaninoff
45.	"The Savage Flames"	The Rite of Spring by Igor Stravinsky
46.	"Sealed Orders"	Symphony No. 1 by Johannes Brahms

== Awards ==
The magazine won a Gold Medal and a Grand Award Trophy for Entertainment Programming at the International Radio Festival 1994 held in New York. These were for the drama in issue four, The Wizard's Spell.
