= Kuhinjica =

- Editor-in-chief: Stefan Janjić
- Categories: Culinary magazine
- Frequency: Monthly
- Circulation: 50,000
- Publisher: Dejan Čavić
- First issue: April 2007
- Company: Scorpion production d.o.o.
- Country: Serbia
- Language: Serbian
- Website: www.kuhinjica.rs
- ISSN: 1452-8525

Kuhinjica (Serbian Cyrillic: Кухињица) is a popular culinary magazine in Serbia, published by Scorpion production. The first issue came out in April 2007. Besides the magazine, there are also a TV serial and a web site with more than 15.000 recipes. A prior editor for the magazine was Zorica Đukić.
