= FutureClaw =

Magazine

- Editor-in-Chief: Bobby Mozumder
- Categories: Fashion, art, music
- Frequency: Occasional
- First issue: 2007
- Company: FutureClaw, Inc.
- Country: United States
- Based in: Burlington, Vermont
- Language: English
- Website: futureclaw.com

FutureClaw is an occasionally published fashion, art, music, and culture print magazine founded in 2007 by a group of friends in Burlington, Vermont, US. The magazine took its name from an electro music blog and DJ crew run by Guy Derry and Adam DeMartino. Bobby Mozumder introduced the idea of creating a photo style-press magazine after collaborating with Derry on a street photo project during Burlington's Art-Hop festival in 2007. The idea of the magazine came to the founders after seeing few high-end American style-press publications compared to the many that exist in Europe and elsewhere around the world.

== Issues ==
Issue #1 was featured by magazine industry guru Samir Husni in his review of notable national magazine launches of 2008.

Issue #3 featured Brazilian model Cintia Dicker and British musician and model Josh Beech. Business Insider featured the issue as part of an article on niche print magazines.

Issue #4, published April 2010, featured contributions by British socialites Daisy Lowe and Alice Dellal, American socialite Lydia Hearst, actress Emmanuelle Seigner, musician Patti Smith, photographer Ryan McGinley, and futurist Syd Mead. The cover photo featured Lowe fully nude and painted in body paint.

Issue #5, released February 2011, featured contributions by supermodels Cindy Crawford and Niki Taylor, South African rap-rave group Die Antwoord, DJ Harley Viera-Newton, artist Terence Koh, and fashion blogger Leandra Medine (The Man Repeller). The Die Antwoord story included a photo of Watkin Tudor Jones' (Ninja) tattooed penis.

Issue #6 featured contributions by supermodel Helena Christensen, shot in her own apartment in her personal clothing, as well as New York socialite Christophe de Menil, photographer Mick Rock, and artist Thierry Guetta (Mr. Brainwash). The issue featured the magazine's first long-form article, written by screenwriter Linda Boroff and biographer John O'Dowd, about the life and death of Hollywood actress Barbara Payton. The UK's Telegraph newspaper noted it had one of the best fashion magazine covers of August 2013. The cover-story photography featuring a nude Helena Christensen by Gregory Derkenne went viral, and caused the FutureClaw.com website to crash.

All issues are viewable in full through the Issuu viewer.
