= Halftime Magazine =

US magazine focusing on the marching arts

- Editor: Christine Ngeo Katzman
- Categories: Music education; marching arts
- Frequency: Bimonthly
- Founder: Christine Ngeo Katzman
- Founded: 2007
- First issue: July/August 2007
- Company: Muse Media, LLC
- Country: United States
- Based in: Cincinnati, Ohio
- Website: www.halftimemag.com
- ISSN: 1939-6171

Halftime Magazine an American magazine focusing on the marching arts. The first issue debuted in the summer of 2007. It is a publication of Muse Media, LLC, which is based in Cincinnati, Ohio. The bimonthly magazine covers high school marching bands, college marching bands, drum corps, winter guards, and indoor drum line. Since 2021, the magazine has been on hiatus.
