= Folker (music magazine) =

German music magazine

- Editor: Michael Kleff
- Staff writers: Stefan Backes
- Categories: Music
- Frequency: Quarterly
- Publisher: Mike Kamp
- Founded: 1998
- Company: fortes medien GmbH
- Country: Germany
- Based in: Fuchstal, Bavaria
- Language: German
- Website: folker.world
- ISSN: 1435-9634

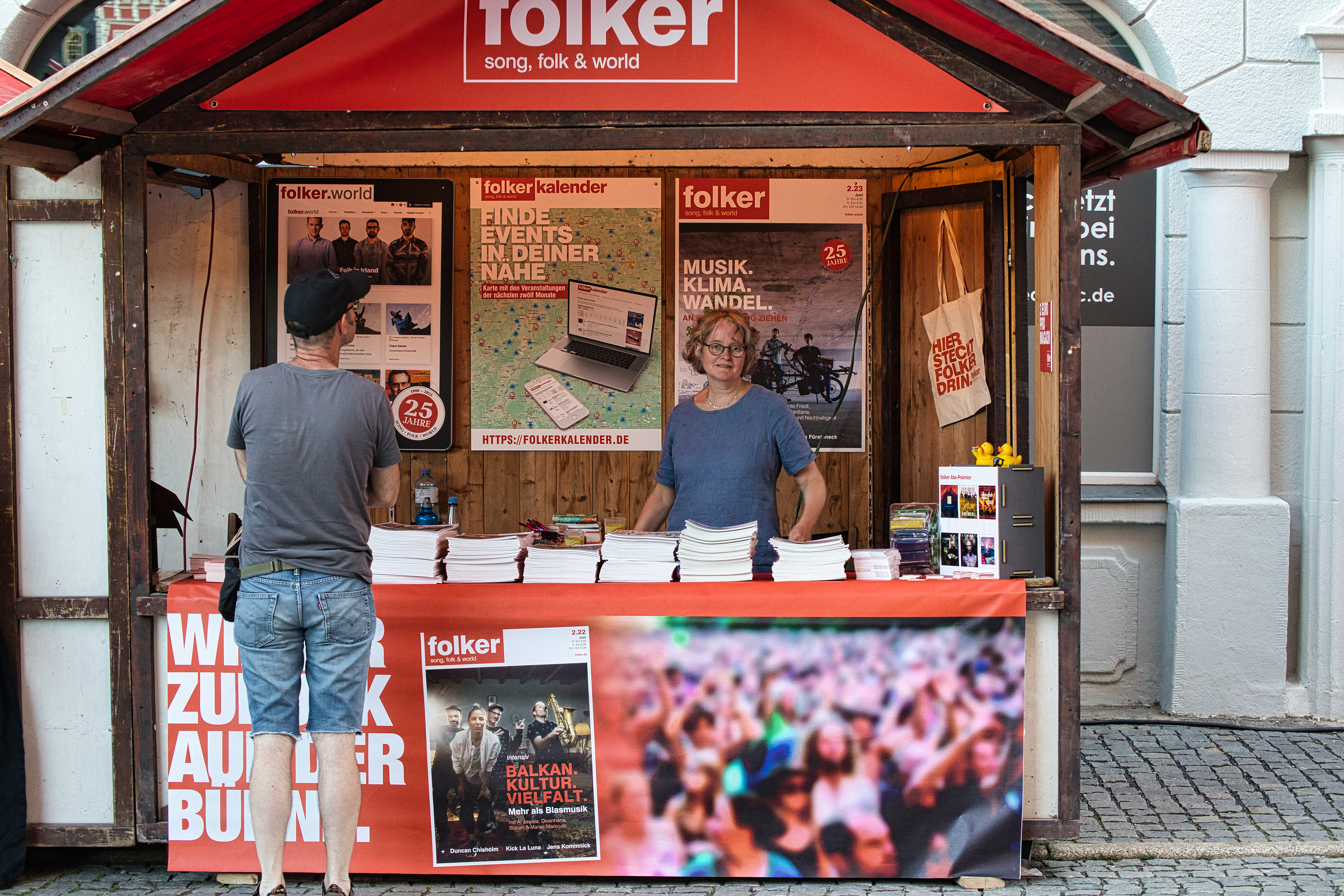
The Folker has its stand 2023 as every year on the market place in the center of the Rudolstadt-Festival.

Folker is a German music magazine. It comprehends reports about folk events, album reviews and musician portraits in folk, traditional and world music.

The magazine had been published bimonthly 1998-2020 by the Christian-Ludwig-Verlag in Moers since 1998. From 2020-presence it is published quarterly by the fortes medien GmbH in Fuchstal. The publisher is Mike Kamp, the final editing is led by Stefan Backes. Mike Kamp is also showcase Scotland Music Ambassador to Germany and a juror of the German music award Preis der deutschen Schallplattenkritik.
