= Colorado Music Buzz =

American magazine

Colorado Music Buzz Magazine
- Editor: Keith Schneider; Eric Fletcher
- Publisher: Keith Schneider
- First issue: June 1, 2005
- Company: Colorado Music Buzz Inc LLC
- Country: United States
- Based in: Parker, Colorado
- Language: English
- Website: coloradomusicbuzz.com

Colorado Music Buzz Magazine is a United States-based magazine about Colorado music, arts and entertainment that is published monthly across the Front Range of Colorado. The magazine was founded in Parker, Colorado in 2005 by Keith Schneider and Eric F. Fletcher.

The final issue of Colorado Music Buzz Magazine was released on September 1, 2015.

== Format ==
The magazine covers genres including:

- Acoustic music
- Alternative rock
- Blues
- Bluegrass
- Classical
- Country
- Electronica
- Folk music
- Hardcore punk
- Hip hop
- Heavy metal
- Jazz
- Musical theatre
- Punk rock
- Reggae
- Rock music
- Ska

The magazine covered Colorado bands and public figures including Devotchka, Flobots, The Fray, Tickle Me Pink, Rose Hill Drive, and Meese, as well aspoliticians such as Denver mayor John Hickenlooper and Eric Dyce, entertainment coordinator for Red Rocks.

It has interviewed artists including Bill Stevenson of the punk bands Descendents and All and co-founder of The Blasting Room recording studio in Fort Collins, Colorado; JR Swartz, formerly of nu metal band Motograter who is currently with Curiosity Kills; Grammy Award-winning jazz and a cappella vocalist Bobby McFerrin; Josh "JP" Paul, bass player for rock band Daughtry; vocalist Ivan Moody of heavy metal band Five Finger Death Punch who is from Westminster, Colorado; and David Ellefson, former bass player for heavy metal band Megadeth and current bassist for F5.

Since 2012, the majority of the magazine's feature and cover stories have been written by managing editors Jenn Cohen and Tim Wenger.

== Celebrity contributors ==
In December 2008, Ahrue Luster of alternative metal band Ill Niño began his monthly column "Road Block".

In March 2009, Nathen Maxwell of the Celtic punk band Flogging Molly started his monthly column "View From The Stage".

In the summer of 2008, Doug Haywood, formerly of the Jackson Browne band, partially serialized his upcoming novel.

Rich Ross of Modulus Guitars and Flea contributes a monthly column called "Lessons from the Road".

Uncle Nasty, formerly from KBPI and the DJs of KTNI-FM, also contribute monthly columns.

Jesse Walker, bassist for the Flobots, was a contributing writer.
