= Street Cred Magazine =

British entertainment and lifestyle magazine

Cover

Street Cred Magazine is a multi-cultural urban entertainment and lifestyle magazine based in England's second largest city, Birmingham. It was founded in 1997 by Mark Dwayne, who at the time was a young singer/songwriter looking to promote himself in the UK. He took the idea of promoting himself using print marketing to a higher level by introducing a product that also helped to market local talent. The magazine grew from a one-page supplement in the Community Enterprise Newspaper to a 100-page glossy title within a few years. Its demographic targets 16-to-30-year-olds interested in the music, fashion and entertainment lifestyle. Now running for 14 years, it has over 400,000 monthly readers in the UK and is available free of charge to a worldwide audience online at streetcredmagazine.com.

Street Cred sections of content include Celebrity Interviews, music reviews, live events, feature articles, fashion, sports, gadgets and self-help topics.

Street Cred Magazine has spawned other types of media and entertainment events, the first of which is a radio program called "Street Cred Live" that began in December 2007 and aired seven days a week on ASTON FM 89.1. It was based on the Aston Villa football ground in the West Midlands. The station reaches 140,000 listeners a day.

In February 2008, "Funkalicious" a monthly club event was launched, held on the last Friday of every month.

Also in 2008 the magazine founded its own record label "Street Cred Records" accompanied by artist management and booking support.

== EMMA humanitarian award ==
In 1998 Street Cred Magazine won an EMMA Humanitarian Award in the category of "Best Media Newcomer" at the Dorchester Hotel in London's West End.

In the company of the likes of novelist and former MP Lord Jeffrey Archer, Darcus Howe of Channel 4's Devil's Advocate and Body Shop founder, Anita Roddick, Street Cred Co-ordinator, Mark Dwayne received the crystal cut glass trophy as the best media newcomer in its field in Britain.
