= Rae Town =

Constant Spring
- Community
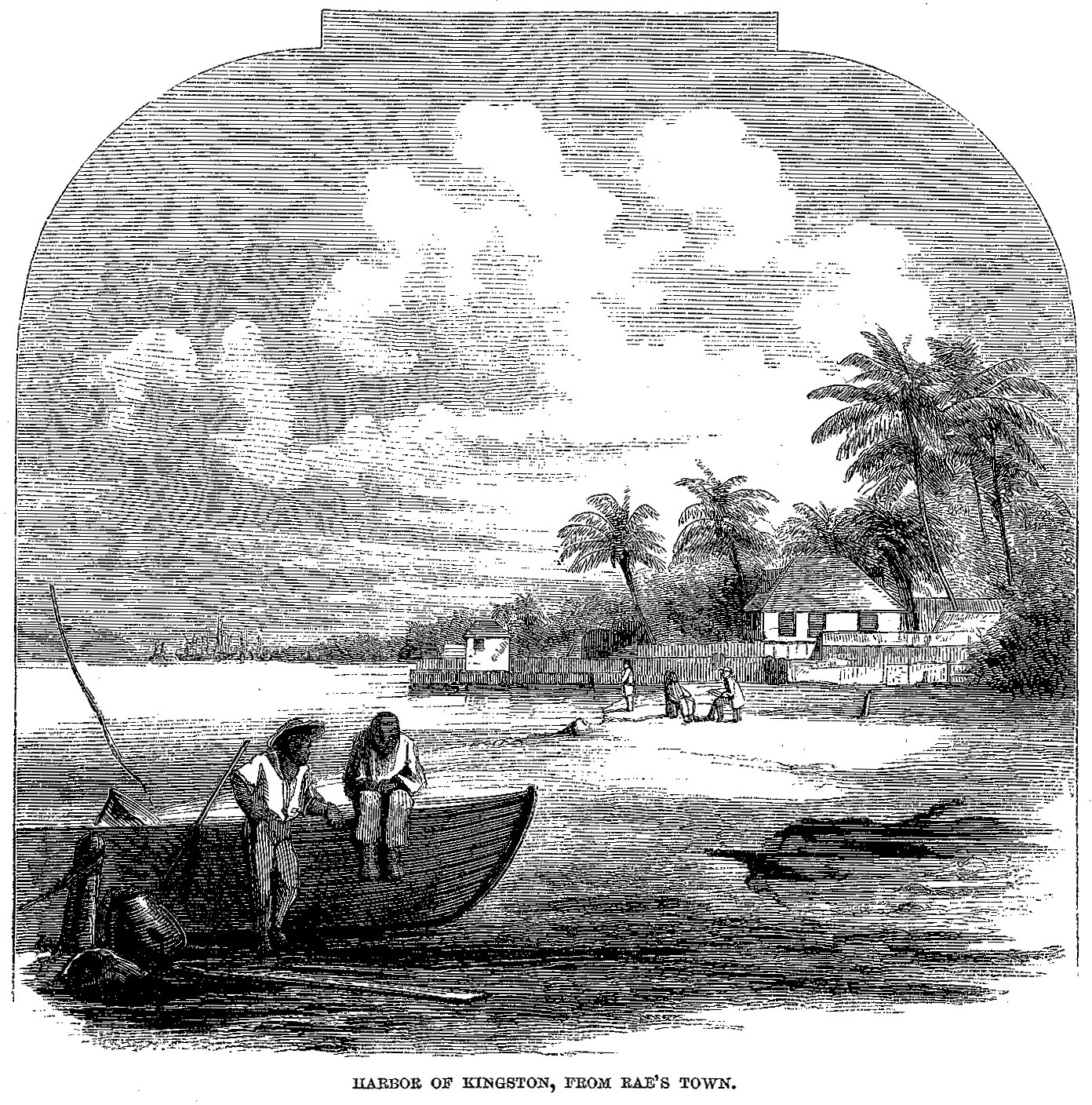
- Etching of a view of Kingston Harbor from "Rae's Town" by W.E. Sewell, 1861

- Location within Jamaica
- Country: Jamaica
- City: Kingston
- Time zone: UTC-5 (EST)

Rae Town is a Kingston, Jamaica neighborhood by Kingston Harbor. Ole Hits is a weekly reggae dance event held Sundays in the neighborhood. Cremo Company ice cream, Caimans, and Molasses Factory operated in the area.
