= Punk Rock Confidential (magazine) =

American quarterly lifestyle magazine

- "It's Not About The Music!"
- Punk Rock Confidential Magazine - Issue 1 cover
- Type: Lifestyle/Music Magazine
- Format: fanzine
- Owner(s): Fat Mike, Sunny Andersen Chanel, Kevin Chanel
- Publisher: Fat Mike
- Editor: Sunny Chanel
- Founded: 2005
- Ceased publication: 2008
- Language: English
- Headquarters: San Francisco, California
- Website: Punk Rock Confidential

Punk Rock Confidential was a quarterly lifestyle magazine published in San Francisco, California, focusing on the look of punk rock music and lifestyle in its many incarnations. Started in 2005 by the trio of Fat Mike of NOFX, Sunny Andersen Chanel (Girlyhead magazine) and Kevin Chanel (ChinMusic! magazine), it was essentially an Us or People-esque full-color glossy for alternative types. It was rooted more in whimsy and the ironic inevitability of punk celebrity than anything involving music. The magazine focused on pictures of bands doing real-life activities - partying, getting married, and living. It also contained punk band gossip, rumors, tongue-in-cheek humor, and parodied "celerbrity" magazine content for the punk music genre.

In the first issue, the magazine staff summarized their intention for publishing. They looked through other magazines published at the time and combined many of the sections and styles that they liked to document the punk community:

"[We wanted to make] A zine that was more eye candy than ideology. We wanted to show punk rock as a lifestyle; the births, deaths, weddings, and the beauty of self-destructive behavior. A zine that has photos taken by people who were going to the show anyway, and took some pictures, instead of someone that went to the show just to take pictures. We want photos from you. From anybody that wants to document their scene. We want pictures of punks doing real things, not posing in an alley or against a brick wall. We think punk rock is still pretty cool and is still a community and there needs to be a zine for .. lifers.".

— Staff of PRC

Multiple issue covers used the tagline "It's Not About The Music!". Punk Rock Confidential ran several recurring columns such as articles covering births, deaths, and weddings; "Everlasting Jobstoppers", covering controversial or poorly done tattoos that might stop band members from getting a job; "Punks Not Dead, but it ain't getting an younger" - a tribute to bands that had played punk music for more than 20 years; scene reports; CD and DVD reviews; and a crossword. The magazine was published until 2008.
