= Zeitschrift für Instrumentenbau =

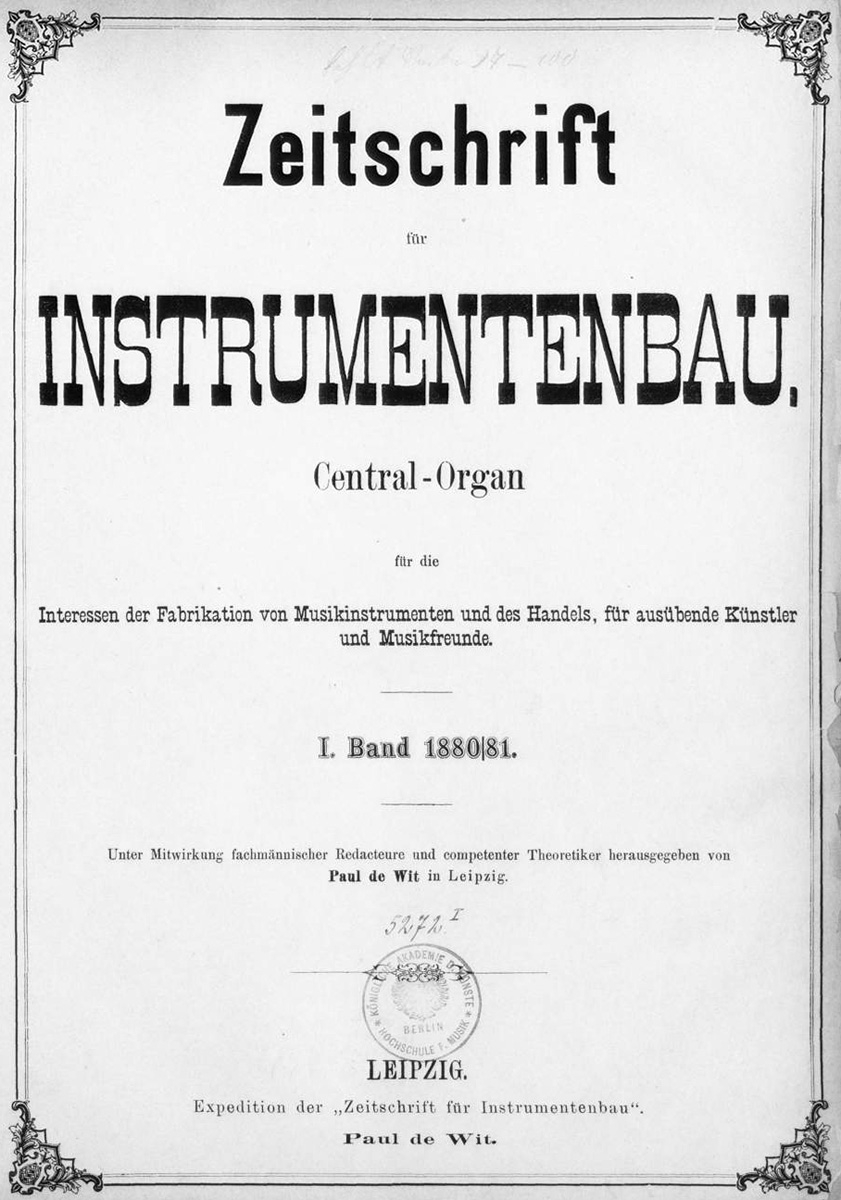
Zeitschrift für Instrumentenbau

The Zeitschrift für Instrumentenbau ("ZfI") (Journal for the Construction of Musical Instruments) was a German-language journal dealing in large part with the manufacture of musical instruments. It was published in Leipzig from 1880 through 1943 and serves as a chronicler of the musical world and as an intelligent reporter on some of the more technical aspects of instrument development.

== History ==
The founder and guiding light of this journal was Paul de Wit, a Dutch cellist and viol player whose instrument collecting activities eventually formed the basis for the Heyer Collection in Cologne and the Royal Collection in Berlin.

The outlook of the journal, though centered in Leipzig, was never limited to the Germanic world; rather, there was a determined effort to report musical news from all over the world, from Melbourne to Buenos Aires, from Lisbon to Moscow. There is particularly good coverage of those countries to which German instruments were exported. Consequently, one finds a great deal of interest in American musical life and the American music trade.

Throughout its history, the format of the ZfI changed but little, nor did the subject matter. The journal existed expressly for the music trade, that is, for instrument builders, purveyors of music-related products of all sorts, music professionals (e.g., piano tuners, instrument dealers). The ZfI regularly reported on musical instrument exhibits in the major metropolitan centers of Europe and the world.

Reports about new inventions and discoveries enliven the pages; newly registered patents for inventions, often illustrated by very clear line drawings, are a standard feature. Through the pages of the ZfI one can follow the development and evolution of many musical instruments (particularly the piano and violin). A lot of attention is given to the Jankó keyboard, for example. One sees changes wrought by the introduction, first of gas, then of electricity, to the musical world.

The journal typically begins with an essay, usually original, but sometimes a translation from English (Edward Heron-Allen) or French (Antoine Vidal). As each issue of the ZfI was relatively short, these essays were often spread over two numbers. A great deal of attention is given to sales of instruments (new and antique), auctions, and instrument repairs.

Organ building, a major musical industry, always received broad coverage. Important new organs from many countries are discussed at some length with the dispositions given completely and organ prospects neatly illustrated, enabling one to trace the succession of styles and tastes.

A section of miscellany kept the reader abreast of important personalities in the world of musical instrument building. Performances, too, were listed and sometimes criticized, but the comments are perhaps more useful for the technical details of the instruments used than for details of the performances. In the pages of ZfI one can trace the development of standard pitch in the various countries of Europe and its significance for various aspects of musical activity.

The journal is quite useful from a music-sociological point of view. Through it one can gain a better understanding of the music trade, its attitudes towards unionization, the improvement of the workplace, management styles and concerns, the division of labor (is piano tuning a proper occupation for women?). The advertisements too furnish a wealth of sociological information.

Even folk instruments such as the zither and the ocarina find their place in the ZfI. Imports of ethnic instruments from Asia and the Pacific are frequently reported, probably due to Paul de Wit's interest in rare and exotic instruments. It was his influence as well that led to the frequent reporting on historical instruments of every type.

The Zeitschrift für Instrumentenbau is a useful source for any development in the musical world of the period before World War I. It is reliable as a source, given that its pro-industry biases are clearly stated.

== Archived editions ==
The Zeitschrift für Instrumentenbau was digitised by the Digital Library Department of the Bavarian State Library in 2006. All editions from 1880 to 1943 are completely available online, page by page.
