= Music magazine =

Magazine dedicated to music

A music magazine is a magazine dedicated to music and music culture. Such magazines typically include music news, interviews, photo shoots, op-eds, essays, record reviews, concert reviews and occasionally have a covermount with recorded music.

== Notable music magazines ==
Music magazines were very prolific in the United Kingdom, with the NME leading sales since its first issue in 1952. NME had a longstanding rival in Melody Maker, an even older publication that had existed since 1926; however, by 2001, falling circulation and the rise of internet music sites caused the Melody Maker to be absorbed into its old rival and cease publishing. Several other British magazines such as Select and Sounds also folded between 1990 and 2000. Current UK music magazines include Kerrang! and Mojo. Magazines with a focus on pop music rather than rock and aimed at a younger market include the now-defunct Smash Hits and the BBC's Top of the Pops, which outlived the television show on which it was based.

The longest running music magazine in the UK is BMG, founded in 1903 by Clifford Essex. BMG, which stands for banjo, mandolin, and guitar, is the oldest fretted-instrument-focused publication and actively promotes acoustic instruments of all kinds.

Major music magazines in the United States include Rolling Stone (founded in 1967), DownBeat (founded in 1934), and Spin (founded in 1985). Clash magazine was voted Music Magazine of the Year in 2004 and is the second largest UK online presence. Clash was also awarded Magazine of the Year at the PPA Scotland Awards. Alternative Press has more of an "underground" coverage including pop punk, post-hardcore and metalcore.

A major digital magazine from Sweden is Melodic. Melodic has its focus mainly on hard rock, melodic metal and alternative music.

Among classical music magazines, Diapason is the most read in France.

An example of a nostalgia magazine is Keep Rockin', a 1950s and 1960s nostalgia magazine. The premiere issue came out in January 2009. The magazine features a mixture of current events surrounding that time period (e.g. concerts, car shows) and stories with original photos from the 1950s and 1960s, as well as some reader-written articles about experiences growing up during that period.

== Covermounts ==
Several music magazines include a free album of music (usually a compilation of tracks by various artists), known in the publishing industry as a covermount. The practice began in the 1980s with UK magazine Smash Hits giving away flexi discs, and graduated to mixtapes and compact discs in the 1990s, with modern magazines such as NME and Mojo frequently including cover compilations.

The tracks are cleared for release by the relevant record companies, and are usually released for promotional purposes.

== See also ==
- Fanzine
- List of music magazines
- Music magazines published in Australia
- Punk zine
