= List of magazines in the United Kingdom =

The following is an incomplete list of current and defunct magazines published in the United Kingdom.

== * ==
- &Asian (Note: An online magazine co-founded by British actress Aimée Kwan in August 2021)

== 0–9 ==
- 3D World
- 3rd Stone
- 5 Magazine
- 10 Magazine
- 20x20 magazine
- 125 Magazine
- 360
- 360 Gamer
- 1843
- 2000 AD

== A ==
- Ablaze!
- Acoustic
- Acumen
- Aeon
- Aeroplane
- Aesthetica
- Air Enthusiast
- Airfix Magazine
- Airfix Model World
- Album
- All About Beer
- All About Space
- All Out Cricket
- Alternative Ulster
- Amateur Gardening
- Amateur Photographer
- The Amazing Pudding
- Ambit
- Amiga Action
- Amiga Computing
- Amiga Force
- Amiga Format
- Amiga Power
- Amiga Survivor
- The Amorist
- Amstrad Action
- Amstrad Computer User
- Amtix
- Anarchy
- Ancient Egypt
- Angel Exhaust
- Angler's Mail
- Anglia
- The Anglo-Welsh Review
- The Angry Pacifist
- Anime UK
- Anorak Magazine
- Another Magazine
- Another Man
- The Antiquary
- The Arab
- Arbeter Fraynd
- The Archaeologist
- Archery UK
- Archive
- Arena
- Arena Three
- Arena Homme +
- Areté
- Arkangel
- Artcore Fanzine
- Art Monthly
- The Artist
- Artrocker
- Asbri
- Asian Babes
- Asian Woman magazine
- Aslan
- Astronomy Now
- Atari User
- The Athenaeum
- Athletics Weekly
- AtomAge
- Attire Accessories
- Attitude
- Audio Arts
- Authentic Science Fiction
- The Authors' Circular
- Autocar
- Auto Express
- Autosport
- AXM

== B ==
- Babel
- Bachtrack
- Back Street Heroes
- BackTrack
- Bad Idea
- Bare
- Barn
- Bass Guitar
- BBC CountryFile
- BBC Focus on Africa
- BBC Gardeners' World
- BBC History
- BBC Knowledge
- BBC MindGames
- BBC Music Magazine
- BBC Science Focus
- BBC Sky at Night
- BBC Wildlife
- Bearded
- Beat Instrumental
- Bella
- Bella Caledonia
- Bent
- Best
- Bi Community News
- BIG
- Big Cheese
- The Big Issue
- Big K
- Bit-Tech
- Bizarre
- Black Music
- Black Static
- Black Velvet
- Blackwood's Magazine
- Blast
- Bliss
- Blitz
- The Blizzard
- BlueSci
- Bluff Europe
- The Bookseller
- Borderline
- The Botanical Register
- The Boudoir
- Boxing Monthly
- Boxing News
- Boys of England
- Boys' World
- Boyz
- Brand
- Bristol in Stereo
- Britanskii Soiuznik
- British Bandsman
- British Birds
- British Chess Magazine
- British Film
- British Journal of Photography
- British Philatelic Bulletin
- British Railways Illustrated
- British Vogue
- British Wildlife
- Broadcast
- Bucketfull of Brains
- The Burlington Magazine
- Bwletin Cymdeithas Emynau Cymru

== C ==
- The Call
- Cambrian Quarterly Magazine and Celtic Repertory
- Cambridge Literary Review
- Camera Owner
- Camerawork
- Candis Magazine
- Canoe & Kayak UK
- Cantab
- Careless Talk Costs Lives
- Carnival
- Carve
- The Cauldron
- Cavalcade
- Chambers's Edinburgh Journal
- The Chap
- Chapman
- Chartist
- Chat
- The Cheese Grater
- The Chemical Engineer
- Chemistry World
- Chess Magazine
- Chic
- Chroma: A Queer Literary Journal
- Cinema Retro
- Cinema X
- City Life
- Clash
- Classic FM Magazine
- Classic Pop
- Classic Rock
- Classical Music
- Classical Recordings Quarterly
- Close Up
- Closer
- Club International
- Coast
- Collecticus
- Comics International
- Commodore Format
- Commodore User
- Common Sense
- Company
- Computer and Video Games
- Computer Gamer
- Computer Music
- Computer Shopper
- Constructor Quarterly
- Contemporary
- Co-op News
- The Cornhill Magazine
- Corsetry and Underwear
- Country Homes & Interiors
- Country Life
- Crack
- The Crack
- Craft&design
- Craftsman Magazine
- Crash
- Creative Camera
- Creative Review
- The Cremorne
- Criminal Law & Justice Weekly
- The Critic
- Cross Rhythms
- The Cricketer
- Current World Archaeology
- Curry Club Magazine
- Curry Life
- Curtis's Botanical Magazine
- Custom PC
- Cycle Sport
- Cycling Active
- Cycling Plus
- Cycling Weekly
- Cycling World
- Cyclist

== D ==
- The Dark Side
- Dazed
- Decanter
- Delayed Gratification
- Diecast Collector
- Digital Camera
- Digital Photographer
- Diva
- DIY
- DJ Mag
- Doctor Who Magazine
- Dork
- Dos Fraye Vort
- Drapers
- Drowned in Sound

== E ==
- The Eagle
- The Economist
- ECOS
- Edge
- Electronics World
- Emancipation and Liberation
- Empire
- The ENDS Report
- Engineering
- The Engineer
- Erotic Review
- Escort
- Esquire
- Ethical Consumer
- Ever Manifesto
- Eurofruit
- Euromoney
- Eye

== F ==
- F1 Racing
- The Face
- Fact
- Fadew
- Farmers Guide
- Fast Bikes
- Feel Good Food
- Fest Magazine
- FHM
- Fiasco
- Fiction on the Web
- The Field
- Fireworks
- Five Star Magazine
- Flintshire Historical Society journal
- Fortean Times
- FourFourTwo
- The Freethinker
- frieze
- Fyne Times

== G ==
- Gamereactor
- Gandalf's Garden
- Gath
- Gay Times
- Gayming Magazine
- Gemma
- Geographical
- Gift Focus
- Girl Talk
- The Girl's Realm
- Gold Dust
- Golf Monthly
- Golwg
- Good Food
- Gower
- Gramophone
- Grand Designs
- Granta
- The Great Outdoors
- Green Anarchist
- Groundtastic
- Guitarist
- The Games Machine
- The Garden
- The Gentleman's Magazine
- The Gentlewoman
- The Glade
- The Guardian Weekly

== H ==
- H&E naturist
- Hazards
- Heat
- Hello!
- Heritage Commercials
- Hero
- Hi-Fi News & Record Review
- History Today
- Holidaymaker
- Holyrood
- The House Magazine
- How It Works
- Huck

== I ==
- i-D
- Ideal Home
- The Idler (1993)
- ImagineFX
- Impact (student magazine)
- Index on Censorship
- The Individual
- In Out
- Interactive Fantasy
- International Socialism
- International Trade Today
- Internet Advisor
- Interzone
- The Isis Magazine
- ITNOW

== J ==
- Jabberwock
- Jack
- Jack and Jill
- The Jackdaw
- Jackie
- Jackpot
- James Bond Car Collection
- Jane's Airport Review
- Jane's Intelligence Review
- Jane's International Defence Review
- Janes World Railways
- Jazz at Ronnie Scott's
- Jazz Forum
- Jazz Journal
- Jazz Review
- Jazzwise
- Jewish Quarterly
- Jockey Slut
- Journalist
- Judge Dredd Megazine
- Judy (girls' magazine)
- Judy (satirical magazine)
- Juke Blues
- Jupiter
- Just Seventeen
- The Justice Gap

== K ==
- Kerrang!
- KIOSK
- Koi

== L ==
- La Belle Assemblée
- Labour Briefing
- The Ladies' Diary
- The Lady's and Gentleman's Diary
- The Lady's Magazine
- The Lady's Monthly Museum
- The Lady's Museum
- The Lady's Realm
- Lancashire Life
- Land&Liberty
- Land and Water
- The Land Magazine
- LeftLion
- Let It Rock
- The Leveller
- The Liberal
- Liberator
- That's Life
- Lifescape
- The Line of Best Fit
- Linux Format
- The List
- The Listener
- Little White Lies
- Liverpool Software Gazette
- Living Marxism
- The Living Tradition
- Loaded
- Lobster
- Locomotive, Railway Carriage & Wagon Review
- The London Aphrodite
- London Bulletin
- London Review of Books
- Look
- Look-in
- Loud and Quiet
- Love
- Love it!
- Lula
- Lusso
- Luxury Briefing

== M ==
- MacFormat
- Mad About Boys
- Magazine of Female Fashions of London & Paris
- Manchester Climate Monthly
- Manga Force: The Ultimate Collection
- Marie Claire
- Marketing
- Marmalade
- Marxism Today
- Match
- Max Power
- Maxim
- Mayfair
- MCV
- Mean Machines
- Mega
- Mega Drive Advanced Gaming
- Mega Power
- MegaTech
- Megaton
- Melody Maker
- Men's Fitness
- Men's Health
- Men Only
- Men's World
- Mersey Beat
- Metal Forces
- Metal Hammer
- Minx
- Mixmag
- Mobile Choice
- Model Engineer
- Model Engineers' Workshop
- The Modern Boy
- Modern Painters
- Modern Railways
- Modern Review
- Mojo
- Monkey
- The Monthly Film Bulletin
- Monthly Magazine
- mookychick
- More!
- Morning Advertiser
- Motor Boat & Yachting
- Motor Boats Monthly
- Motor Sport
- Mountain Bike Rider
- Mountain Biking UK
- MP3
- Mslexia
- Murky Depths
- Muscle & Fitness
- Museums Journal
- MusicOMH
- Music Week
- Musics
- Mute
- Muzik
- MyM

== N ==
- Al Nahla
- Naked Punch Review
- Narrow Gauge and Industrial Railway Modelling Review
- Nature of Wales
- Nature's Home
- Neo
- Neon
- Nerve
- net
- New!
- New Escapologist
- New Humanist
- New Humanity
- New Internationalist
- New Liberal Review
- New Media Age
- The New Age
- New Civil Engineer
- The New Monthly Magazine
- New Scientist
- New Society
- New Statesman
- New Walk
- New Welsh Review
- NME
- Notion

== O ==
- The Observatory
- Octane
- OK!
- The Oldie
- Opera
- The Orchid Review
- Organ
- The Organ
- Overload
- The Oxford Magazine
- Oxford Poetry
- Oxonian Review

== P ==
- Pagan Dawn
- Page 6
- The Pall Mall Magazine
- Parade
- Parliamentary Brief
- PC Format
- PC Gamer
- PC Magazine
- PC Player
- PC Pro
- PC Zone
- Peace News
- The Pearl
- Performance BMW
- Pentacle
- Penthouse
- The People's Friend
- Personal Computer Games
- Personal Computer World
- Petticoat
- The Philosophers' Magazine
- Philosophy Now
- Photo Bits
- Photography Monthly
- Physics World
- Pick Me Up
- Picturegoer
- Picture Post
- Picture Show
- Pilot
- Planet
- Planet PC
- The Plantsman
- Play
- PlayStation Official Magazine
- PlayStation World
- Plays International & Europe
- Plus Magazine
- Pocket Gamer
- Poetry Life and Times
- Poetry London
- Poetry Wales
- Police Review
- Political Magazine
- Popular Astronomy
- Positive News
- The Poster
- Postscripts
- Power Slam
- Practical Boat Owner
- Practical Photography
- Practical Reptile Keeping
- Practical Wireless
- Pride Life
- Pride Magazine
- Private Eye
- Procycling
- Prog
- Prospect
- Psychologies
- The Psychologist
- PSM3
- Punch

== Q ==
- Quest (esoteric magazine)
- The Quietus

== R ==
- Race Walking Record
- RadCom
- Radio Times
- Rail
- Railnews
- Railway Modeller
- Railways Illustrated
- The Railway Magazine
- Raw
- Raze
- Razzle
- The Reader
- The Realist
- The Rebel
- Rebel Magazine
- Recharge
- Record Collector
- Record Mirror
- The Red Dragon
- Red Pepper
- Red Rag
- Renewal
- Resident Advisor
- Restaurant
- Resurgence & Ecologist
- Retro Gamer
- The Revival
- Rhythm
- The Rialto
- Rising East
- Rock-A-Rolla
- Rock Sound
- Rouleur
- Rugby League World
- Rugby World
- Running Fitness
- RWD Magazine

== S ==
- Saga Magazine
- SA Promo
- Sales Promotion
- The Salisbury Review
- Scarlet
- Science Fantasy
- SciFiNow
- Scootering
- Scotcampus
- The Scots Magazine
- Scottish Field
- Scottish Left Review
- Scream
- Screen International
- Searchlight
- Sega Force
- Sega Power
- Sega Pro
- Sega Saturn Magazine
- Select
- The Servant's Magazine
- SFX
- She
- She Kicks
- Shivers
- Shoot
- Shooting Gazette
- Shooting Times
- ShortList
- Shout
- Sidewalk
- Sight & Sound
- Signature
- Sinclair Programs
- Sinclair User
- Singletrack
- The Skeptic
- Skin Two
- The Skinny
- Smallholder
- Smash Hits
- Snooker Scene
- Socialist Review
- Socialist Standard
- Songlines
- Sonic the Comic
- Sony Magazine
- Sound on Sound
- Sounds
- Source, lifestyle magazine
- Source, photography magazine
- Spaceflight
- Speakeasy
- The Spectator
- Spiked
- The Spirits Business
- Splosh!
- The Spokesman
- Sport
- Sporting Cyclist
- Sporting Gun
- The Sporting Magazine
- SquareGo
- Square Mile
- ST Action
- ST/Amiga Format
- ST Format
- Stamp Collecting
- Standpoint
- Star Trek Magazine
- Starburst
- Start Art
- The Stamp-Collector's Review and Monthly Advertiser
- The Strand Magazine
- Stranger
- The Student Journals
- Studio International
- The Studio
- Stuff
- Stylist
- Suck
- SUITCASE Magazine
- Super Play
- SurfGirl
- Switch Player
- The Sword
- System

== T ==
- T3
- Tate Etc.
- Take a Break
- Tatler
- Theatre Record
- Tilllate
- Time Out
- Times Higher Education
- The Times Literary Supplement
- These Football Times
- This England
- Tit-Bits
- Today's Golfer
- Today's Railways Europe
- Today's Railways UK
- Top Gear
- Top of the Pops
- Torchwood Magazine
- Tortured Souls
- Total!
- Total Carp
- Town Hall Steps
- Tramways & Urban Transit
- Transmission
- Transgressions: A Journal of Urban Exploration
- Triathlon Plus
- Tribune
- TV & Satellite Week
- TV Choice
- TV Comic
- TV Quick
- TVTimes
- TV Zone
- Twikker

== U ==
- Ulster Tatler
- Uncut
- Urban Realm

== V ==
- Varsity
- Vision
- Vive Le Rock
- Viz

== W ==
- Wales
- Wales Arts Review
- Wallpaper
- Wanderlust
- Wargames Illustrated
- Warlock
- The Week
- Weekly Illustrated
- Well Red magazine
- Welsh Book Studies
- Welsh Living
- Welsh Outlook
- Westminster Review
- What Car?
- What Digital Camera
- What Hi-Fi? Sound and Vision
- What Investment
- What Satellite and Digital TV
- What's on TV
- When Saturday Comes
- White Dwarf
- Whitehouse
- Whitelines
- The White Review
- Who Do You Think You Are magazine
- Winning Bicycle Racing Illustrated
- The Wire
- Wired UK
- Wisden Cricket Monthly
- The Wolf
- Woman & Home
- Woman
- Woman's Journal
- Woman's Own
- Woman's Realm
- The Woman's Signal
- Women's Suffrage Journal
- Woman's Weekly
- The Woman's World
- Wonderland
- The Word
- Words & Pictures
- World Medicine
- The World of Interiors
- World Soccer
- The World Today
- Wormwood

== X ==
- Xplode Magazine

== Y ==
- Yachting Monthly
- Yachting World

== Z ==
- Zero Tolerance

== Defunct ==
- 8000 Plus
- ACE
- Are You Scared To Get Happy?
- Commodore Force
- Dàna
- Dancing Times
- The Dandy
- DC-UK
- Deadline
- Delta
- Develop
- Digitiser
- Diogenes
- Disability Now
- Disc
- Disco 45
- Dispatches
- Documentary News Letter
- Dodgem Logic
- Dreamwatch
- DVD Monthly
- The Ecologist
- Emel
- Energy Matters
- Encounter
- The English Mechanic and World of Science
- English Review (18th century)
- The English Review
- The Englishwoman's Domestic Magazine
- English Woman's Journal
- Entertain Magazine
- ENZK
- Eon
- Escape
- Essentials
- Ethos
- Eve
- Everyman
- The European Magazine
- Exit
- Eye Spy Magazine
- Fairy Chess Review
- Family Circle
- The Family Friend
- Fast Car
- Fiesta
- Filament
- Films and Filming
- Film Review
- Film Weekly
- First Empire: The International Magazine for the Napoleonic Enthusiast, Historian, and Gamer
- FirstPlay
- The First Post
- The Fly
- Folk Review
- Fortnight
- The Fortnightly Review
- Front
- fRoots
- Future Music
- g3
- gal-dem
- GamesMaster
- GamesMaster International
- GamesTM
- Games-X
- Gay Left
- Girl
- Girl Illustrated
- The Glasgow Looking Glass
- Glasgow University Magazine
- Gloucestershire Notes and Queries
- Golf Punk
- Harpies and Quines
- Hayal
- Heatwave
- Hip Hop Connection
- Home Chat
- Home Notes
- Honey
- Hotdog
- House of Hammer
- The Idler (1892–1911)
- The Illustrated London News
- Illustrated Sporting and Dramatic News
- Imagine
- Impact (action entertainment magazine)
- InStyle UK
- International Cycle Sport
- International Record Review
- Internet Magazine
- Khamsin
- Knave
- Krazy
- New Worlds
- NGC Magazine
- Night Magazine
- Nimbus
- Nintendo Gamer
- Nova
- Now (1996–2019 magazine)
- Now! (1979–1981 magazine)
- No 1
- Numbers
- Nuts
- The Occult Review
- Official Dreamcast Magazine
- Official Nintendo Magazine
- Official Xbox Magazine
- Oink!
- Once a Week
- The One
- One+One Filmmakers Journal
- Outcast
- The Outlook
- The Owl
- The Oxford and Cambridge Magazine
- The Oyster
- Oz
- Q
- Q News
- Quest
- Quim
- The Quiver
- Quiz Kids
- The Quorum
- QX
- Tait's Edinburgh Magazine
- Tamil Times
- Tales of Wonder
- Ten.8
- The Theatrical Times
- Time and Tide
- Total Film
- Total Football
- Total Guitar
- Total PC Gaming
- Total Politics
- Umbrella Magazine
- Undercurrents
- The Universal Magazine
- UPraw
- The Vagenda
- Vanity Fair
- Velo Vision
- The Vineyard
- Vole
- X
- Xbox World
- X-One
- Your 64
- Your Commodore
- Your Computer
- Your Family Tree
- Your Sinclair
- Zembla
- Zero
- Zest
- ZigZag
- ZIP
- Zoo Weekly
- The Zoologist
- Zzap!64

== See also ==
- British boys' magazines
- British Society of Magazine Editors
- List of 18th-century British periodicals
- List of 19th-century British periodicals
- List of early-20th-century British children's magazines and annuals
- List of magazines published in Scotland
- List of newspapers in the United Kingdom
