= TI Media =

British magazine publisher

TI Media Ltd.
- Formerly: International Publishing Company (1963–1968); IPC Magazines Ltd (1968–1998); IPC Media (1998–2014); Time Inc. UK (2014–2018)
- Company type: Subsidiary
- Industry: Consumer marketing; Content and brand licensing; Entertainment; Magazine publishing; News
- Founded: 1963; 63 years ago
- Defunct: 2020; 6 years ago
- Fate: Acquired by Future plc
- Successor: Future plc
- Headquarters: London, United Kingdom

TI Media Ltd. (formerly International Publishing Company, IPC Magazines Ltd, IPC Media and Time Inc. UK) was a consumer magazine and digital publisher in the United Kingdom, with a portfolio selling over 350 million copies each year. Most of its titles now belong to Future plc.

== History ==
=== Origins ===
The British magazine publishing industry in the mid-1950s was dominated by a handful of companies, principally the Associated Newspapers (founded by Lord Harmsworth in 1890), Odhams Press Ltd, Newnes/Pearson, and the Hulton Press, which fought each other for market share in a highly competitive marketplace.

=== Fleetway ===
In 1958 Cecil Harmsworth King, chairman of the newspaper group, The Daily Mirror Newspapers Limited which included the Daily Mirror and the Sunday Pictorial (now the Sunday Mirror), together with provincial chain West of England Newspapers, made an offer for Amalgamated Press. The offer was accepted, and in January 1959 he was appointed its chairman.

Within a few months he changed its name to Fleetway Publications, Ltd. after the name of its headquarters, Fleetway House in London's Farringdon Street.

Shortly thereafter, Odhams Press absorbed both George Newnes and the Hulton Press. King saw an opportunity in this to rationalise the overcrowded women's magazine market, in which Fleetway and Newnes were the major competitors, and made a bid for Odhams on behalf of Fleetway that was too attractive to ignore. Fleetway took over Odhams in the month of March 1961.

=== International Publishing Company ===
In consequence, King controlled publishing interests which included two national daily and two national Sunday newspapers (the newspaper interests being informally tagged The Mirror Group), along with almost one hundred consumer magazines, more than two hundred trade and technical periodicals, and interests in book publishing. This included the combined business interests of Fleetway, Odhams, and Newnes.

All of the companies involved had been acquired without any significant change in management, save for the appointment of Mirror Group directors as chairmen. In 1963 all the companies were combined by the creation of a parent (or "holding") company called the International Publishing Company (known informally as IPC). All of the existing companies would continue to exist, but as IPC subsidiaries.

IPC then set up a management development department in 1965, to rationalise its holdings, so that its various subsidiaries would no longer be in competition with each other for the same markets. This led to a reorganisation of the Group, in 1968, into six divisions:

- IPC Newspapers – including The People and The Sun (soon sold), as well as the Daily Mirror and Sunday Mirror
- IPC Magazines – consumer magazines and comics
- IPC Trade and Technical – specialist magazines (later known as IPC Business Press Ltd.)
- IPC Books – all book publishing (headed by Paul Hamlyn, whose own company had been acquired by IPC).
- IPC Printing – all non-newspaper printing operations (headed by Arnold Quick, whose own company had also been acquired by IPC).
- IPC New Products – launching pad for products that used new technology (headed by Alistair McIntosh).

All the divisions were headed by chairmen who originated in Mirror Group, except for Hamlyn, Quick and McIntosh.

==== IPC Magazines ====
The turmoil at IPC in 1969 led to major consolidations in the joint comics publishing divisions, IPC Magazines Ltd., which was under the responsibility of Jack Legrand, formerly the managing editor of Fleetway's juvenile publications. Odhams' Power Comics line of titles were cancelled, as was Hulton Press's long-running adventure comic Eagle (merging with Fleetway's Lion from 2 May 1969). The humour comic Giggle, aimed at the slightly younger market dominated by Fleetway's Buster, was also dropped, being merged into Buster in the spring of 1969. Buster, like Odhams' Smash!, also now became a publication of IPC Magazines Ltd. (IPC Magazines also took over another UK publisher, City Magazines, around this time.)

=== Reed International takeover ===
In May 1968, a boardroom coup had replaced Cecil King with his deputy chairman, Hugh Cudlipp, a former newspaper editor. Cudlipp had no interest in management, and was uneasy both with his new role and with IPC's diversification into computerised publication and other new technology. In 1969, Cudlipp proposed to former Mirror Group director Don Ryder — who was then chairman of the Reed Group, in which IPC had a 30% shareholding — to mount a reverse takeover of IPC by Reed. IPC-Mirror Group was thus itself taken over in 1970, by the paper-making company Albert E Reed, which then renamed itself Reed International. In 1974, part of the publishing interests of Reed International were separated into IPC Magazines Ltd (comprising the magazine and comics holdings) and Mirror Group Newspapers (comprising the newspaper holdings). The latter was sold to Pergamon Holdings Ltd, a private company owned by Robert Maxwell, in 1984.

In 1988, IPC acquired Family Circle from the International Thomson Organization. In 1989, IPC acquired TVTimes. In the early 1990s IPC launched Loaded, which began a wave of "lad's mags".

In 1992, following a merger with Dutch science publisher Elsevier NV, Reed International underwent a further name change, becoming Reed Elsevier (now RELX Group).

==== Sale of Fleetway ====
In 1987, part of the comics holdings of IPC Magazines Ltd (comprising those comics and characters created after 1 January 1970, plus 26 specified characters from Buster, which was then still being published) were placed in a separate company, Fleetway Publications, which was sold to Pergamon Holdings.

In 1991, Egmont UK purchased Fleetway from Pergamon, merging it with their own comics publishing operation, London Editions, to form Fleetway Editions. The latter was absorbed into the main Egmont brand by 2000, having sold off the continuing titles (such as 2000 AD), and continued with only reprint and licensed titles (e.g. Sonic The Comic).

IPC had retained the other comics characters and titles, i.e. those created before 1970 (except the 26 characters from Buster), including Sexton Blake, The Steel Claw, and Battler Britton. One character, Dan Dare, was sold separately and is currently owned by the Dan Dare Corporation. In 2016 and 2018, Egmont sold its remaining library of IPC/Fleetway to Rebellion Developments, who had previously acquired 2000 AD in 2000.

=== Time Inc. takeover ===
In 1998, IPC Magazines Ltd was subject to a management buyout financed by Cinven, a venture capital group, and the company was renamed IPC Media. Cinven then sold the company to Time Inc., then the magazine publishing subsidiary of Time Warner (now Warner Bros. Discovery), in 2001. In January 2009, Evelyn Webster became the company's chief executive, replacing Sylvia Auton who had run it since 2001

IPC Media formally became Time Inc. UK in September 2014, creating a single Time Inc. brand in both the US and UK.

In April 2012, IPC Media won an award for Best Production Team of the Year at the Professional Publishers Association Production and Environment Awards 2012.

=== 2018 sale to Epiris ===
On 26 February 2018, Meredith Corporation, who had completed its purchase of Time Inc. almost a month earlier, announced it was selling Time Inc. UK to a fund associated with British private equity firm Epiris. The transaction closed on 19 March of that year. In June 2018, the company was renamed TI Media. In September 2018, TI Media sold its library of pre-1970 IPC Comics titles to Rebellion Developments. In 2019, TI Media sold its music magazines to BandLab Technologies.

=== 2020 acquisition by Future ===
TI Media was acquired by Future plc on 21 April 2020 following shareholder and Competition and Markets Authority approval. Future subsequently divested Amateur Photographer, Trusted Reviews, and World Soccer and absorbed the rest of TI Media into Future Publishing.

== Publishing divisions ==
TI Media divisions up until Future plc acquisition including:

- 25 Beautiful Homes
- Amateur Gardening
- Angler's Mail
- Chat
- Country Homes & Interiors
- Country Life
- Cycling Weekly
- Decanter
- The Field
- Golf Monthly
- Goodtoknow
- Homes & Gardens
- Horse & Hound
- Ideal Home
- Livingetc
- Marie Claire U
- Motor Boat & Yachting
- Mountain Bike Rider (MBR)
- Pick Me Up
- Practical Boat Owner
- Rugby World
- Shooting Gazette
- Shooting Times
- ShootingUK
- Sporting Gun
- Style at Home
- Trusted Reviews
- TV & Satellite Week
- TVTimes
- Wallpaper
- What's on TV
- Woman
- Woman & Home
- Woman's Own
- Woman's Weekly
- Yachting Monthly
- Yachting World
- YBW.com

== See also ==
- List of AP, Fleetway and IPC Comics publications
