= List of geothermal springs in the United Kingdom =

This is a list of geothermal springs in the United Kingdom, otherwise known as warm springs and hot springs (defined as those hotter than 37 degrees C):

== England ==
- Bakewell British Legion 11.6 °C (52.9 °F)
- Bakewell Recreation Ground 13.3 °C (55.9 °F)
- Bath 40 °C (104 °F)
- Beresford Dale, River Dove 13.8 °C (56.8 °F)
- Bradwell Spring 12.4 °C (54.3 °F)
- Crich, Meerbrook Sough, Leashaw Farm 17 °C (63 °F)
- Crich, Ridgeway Sough, Whatstandwell 14.1 °C (57.4 °F)
- Cross Bath, Bath, Somerset 41 °C (106 °F)
- Droitwich Spa, Worcestershire 35 °C (95 °F)
- The Hetling Spring, Bath, Somerset 47 °C (117 °F)
- Hotwells, Bristol 24 °C (75 °F)
- The King's Bath, Bath, Somerset 45 °C (113 °F)
- Lower Dimindale, Derbyshire 11.5 °C (52.7 °F)
- Matlock, Derbyshire Thermal springs 20 °C (68 °F)
- St Ann's Well, Buxton, Derbyshire 27 °C (81 °F)28 °C (82 °F)
- Stall Street Fountain, Bath, Somerset 46 °C (115 °F)
- Stoke Sough, Grindleford 14 °C (57 °F) 11.6 °C (52.9 °F)
- Stoney Middleton 18 °C (64 °F) 17.7 °C (63.9 °F)

== Wales ==
- Taff's Well Thermal Spring, Rhondda Cynon Taff, South Wales 18.9 °C (66.0 °F)

== See also ==
- List of spa towns in the United Kingdom
