= Oh My Gods! =

Webcomic by Shivian Montar Balaris

- Author: Shivian Montar Balaris
- Website: http://ohmygods.co.uk/
- Current status/schedule: Completed
- Launch date: 7 March 2002
- End date: 17 March 2009
- Genre(s): Religion, Humor

Oh My Gods! is a webcomic written and illustrated by Shivian Montar Balaris. It deals with the Neopagan, Pagan, and Wiccan faiths. The interaction of followers of these faiths with Christian fundamentalists and followers of other religions is the main concern of the story.

It debuted on 7 March 2002. The strip initially featured four main cartoon characters whose outlook on life was stereotypical: Stan the gay man, Vera the bull-dyke, Winston the nerd, and Victor the moron. These four have since outgrown their initial "cookie cutter" molds and taken on lives of their own. The cast has since expanded to include additional characters such as Fundie, Kay, and Reiki Master.

Within the strip all characters are assumed to be Pagan, unless labelled otherwise by crosses on their shirts. The main characters often comment on bad Pagans and on the opposition they receive from fundamentalists. Despite the strip's frequent references to Pagan and Wiccan sub-culture, it has a substantial Christian following as well as a Neopagan audience, and even among Unitarian Universalists.

Many strips are the result of viewer suggestion, and Oh My Gods! as a whole often reflects the personal experiences of the artist. Some criticized the comic for portraying Hindu deity Krishna as a female.

The last official strip was posted on 17 March 2009. The following year, a strip entitled "Finale" was posted along with a note from the creator indicating that he had decided to cease creating the Oh My Gods! comic.

== Special strips ==
In addition to the normal strips Oh My Gods! also features simple reverse font slogans which are supposed to resemble religious bumper stickers and special remembrances of the deaths of Shivian Balaris's father and Pope John Paul II, and the September 11, 2001 attacks. The first anniversary strip was in the form of a short movie.

== Characteristic features ==
Characters have died in the course of the story and remained so, in a departure from the convention of comic strip comedy. Elements of fantasy (fairies, boob-vampires, etc.) take the story into the realms of the surreal, though it keeps a thread of realism. This fantastic aspect is embellished by the appearance of such characters as the Pope, a Clown for Christ, and Unitarian Universalists who are depicted as Borg.

Oh My Gods! has a characteristic "preschool" like drawing style, with characters only having eyes, one perspective, and no fingers. The drawing style is based loosely on a popular webcomic - Little Gamers, et al. In the 8 March 2002 comic, Shivian acknowledges this by doing what the characters themselves say is "a blatant ripoff". Die-hard fans will also make what they call "Ohmygodsifications" of themselves, or what they would look like if they were a character in the strip.

Oh My Gods! also very often breaks the fourth wall. Characters are well aware of their existence as characters in a comic, and they are often depicted as conversing with Shivian or commenting on things occurring in his interactions with the comic or life at large. Additionally, they have been shown great surprise when Shivian made a change to the style of the comic such as the introduction of color, legs, or fleshed out backgrounds. In another instance, Shivian is shown as storing the props for the comic in the basement of their house.

== Recurring characters ==
=== Main characters ===
- Stan - He is the main character and gay; his current boyfriend is Vincent.
- Vera - She is a lesbian who owns the local metaphysical store, Neo Aquarius and Other Planets. She is also a Native American shamaness.
- Victor - He is often portrayed as not being a mentally clear individual, leading to many problems. He is tormented by his fairy spirit guides and Larry the word balloon.
- Winston - He loves computers and is geeky.

=== Supporting characters ===
- Fundie - He is a stereotypical fundamentalist, Christian who tries to convert/save the souls of the pagan characters. He's also a frequent target of Stan's practical jokes.
- Vincent - He is Stan's boyfriend and is often preoccupied by sex.
- Futhark Kids: Perth, Othala and Asa -
- Johnnie - Leader of the local sect of the Pagan Spiritual Tradition of the Spiritual Fish.
- Craig - Follower of the Spiritual Fish.
- Kay - She is the leader of the sect of the Spiritual Fish, and is also Wiccan.
- The Fairies - Victor's spirit guides. They often follow Victor around and torment him.
- Reiki Master - A self-proclaimed master of the Reiki.
- The Pope -
- Jacob, a Clown for Christ - A clown advocating the message that Jesus is fun.
- Linda - A toned down female version of fundie. She is often seen smiting people and hanging out with Fundie.
- Candy, a Cheerleader for Christ - A cheerleader who cheers the message of Jesus Christ.
- Apollinis Fututor - Captain Dead Language - He speaks Latin and wears Roman armor.
- Fina - A black cat who hangs out with Larry the word balloon and the fairies.
- Tina DeValve - She is an atheist who was once the Boob Vampire.
- UU of 8 - A Unitarian Universalist whose goal in life is merging all religions into one.
- Saint Grand High Markus, Ordained Ceremonial Magician of the XXXII Order of Apsu - A ceremonial magician.
- Nate - A chaos magician who is shown to be more level-headed than many of the other recurring characters.
- Cthulhu – He is based on the H. P. Lovecraft character by the same name.
- Nick – An African-American pagan who's fond of hoodoo, curses and Buddhism.
- Queernunnos (Herbert) - A self-proclaimed embodiment of the "Great Pink God". In late 2007, Oh My Gods! went through a site redesign and, since then Queernunnos (Herbert) is no longer listed on the supporting cast page.

== Appearances ==
Oh My Gods! has also been featured in Prediction (UK magazine), SIPA News (local newsletter), PagaNet News (global newspaper), newWitch (national magazine), Eldaring.de (German website), the Cauldron.net (website), Pentacle (magazine & website), Mississippi State University WPSA (website), the SORCery Convention (event), Akashan Pathways (website), Modern Wiccan (website), WynterGreene (newspaper), the Daily Egyptian (newspaper of Southern Illinois University Carbondale), The Scribe (newsletter), Pagan Press (newsletter), The Witch's Path (newsletter), Connect (newsletter), Between the Worlds (event), Pagan Spirit Gathering (event), and Something Awful (Awful Link of the Day).

== In print ==
In March 2007, Oh My Gods! was made available in book form for the first time. As of February 2009, five volumes of yearly anthologies had been made available at the print-on-demand publisher Lulu. These volumes include:

- Balaris, Shivian (March 2007). Oh My Gods! Complete Year One Anthology. Oh My Gods!. ISBN 978-1-4303-0456-2.
- Balaris, Shivian (October 2007). Oh My Gods! Complete Year Two Anthology. Oh My Gods!.
- Balaris, Shivian (June 2008). Oh My Gods! Complete Year Three Anthology. Oh My Gods!.
- Balaris, Shivian (June 2008). Oh My Gods! Complete Year Four Anthology. Oh My Gods!.
- Balaris, Shivian (June 2008). Oh My Gods! Complete Year Five Anthology. Oh My Gods!.

In July 2011, two new omnibus volumes of Oh My Gods! were announced on the comic's website. These two volumes were released in eBook and hardback in March 2013 through Lulu. Volume 1 covers the first 1051 published strips plus some unpublished content, while Volume 2 covers the remaining 1049 strips and bonus content. These volumes are the first time that years six and seven of the comic have been made available in book form:

- Balaris, Shivian (March 2013). Oh My Gods! Omnibus - Vol. 1. Oh My Gods!.
- Balaris, Shivian (March 2013). Oh My Gods! Omnibus - Vol. 2. Oh My Gods!.

== Awards ==
It has won the Golden Web Award for 2003–2004, was a UserFriendly.org Link of the Day and has received reviews from the Shadow Witch Web and Sequential Tart.

== See also ==
- List of comic strips
- List of webcomics
