= Craft and Design =

Craft and Design may refer to:

- Design and Technology (also Craft Design and Technology, D&T, D.T, or Craft and Design in Scotland), a National Curriculum academic subject of the UK educational system that can be taken at all levels from primary school upwards, and is also offered in several other countries such as Brunei, Bermuda, Singapore and Botswana
- craft&design Magazine a magazine about crafts in the UK.
