= PSPaudioware =

Music software company

PSPaudioware.com s.c.
- Company type: Corporation
- Founded: 2000
- Headquarters: Warsaw, Poland
- Key people: Antoni Ozynski, Co-founder; Mateusz Wozniak, Co-founder and Lead Developer
- Products: Computer software, music software
- Website: www.pspaudioware.com

PSPaudioware.com s.c. (Professional Sound Projects) is a software company that develops digital signal processors and audio effects for use in composing, recording, mixing, mastering, post-production, and broadcasting. It was co-founded by lifelong friends Antoni Ozynski and lead developer Mateusz Wozniak, after finishing university, in Warsaw, Poland in 2000. PSPaudioware was one of the first developers of audio plug-ins for digital audio workstations. Its motto is "It's the sound that counts!"

== Beginnings and PSP VintageWarmer ==
PSP VintageWarmer2 digital simulation of an analog-style, a single- or multi-band compressor/limiter

In 2000, PSPaudioware released the PSP StereoPack and PSP MixPack to underwhelming response. In 2002 it released PSP VintageWarmer, a unique audio processor which was awarded Computer Music's "Ultimate Buy" award, has received great reviews and endorsements from professionals worldwide, and remains PSPaudioware's best selling plug-in. PSPaudioware continues to release well-regarded software audio processors, creative effects, and digital simulations of hardware audio effects and devices.

== Lexicon PCM42 and PSP 84 ==
Lexicon PSP 42 digital stereo delay and phrase sampler plug-in

In 2002, PSPaudioware unveiled a software emulation of the Lexicon PCM42. Lexicon themselves approved the plug-in and gave them the rights to use the name. PSPaudioware later released their own variation on the PCM42, dubbed the PCM 84. In 2010, the PSP 84 was updated to the PSP 85.

== Products ==
- PSP StereoPack
- PSP MixBass
- PSP MixSaturator
- PSP MixPressor
- PSP MixTreble
- PSP VintageWarmer
- Lexicon PSP 42
- PSP 84
- PSP EasyVerb
- PSP MasterQ
- PSP Nitro
- PSP MasterComp
- PSP 608MD
- PSP Neon HR
- PSP VintageWarmer2
- PSP Xenon
- PSP MixPack2 (with PSP MixGate)
- PSP sQuad (PSP ClassicQ, PSP ConsoleQ, PSP RetroQ, PSP preQursor)
- PSP oldTimer
- PSP McQ
- PSP 85
- PSP N2O
- PSP MixPack2
- PSP oldTimerME
- PSP NeonHR2
- PSP NobleQ
- PSP BussPressor
- Auria (includes PSP MasterStrip, PSP ChannelStrip)
- PSP Echo
- PSP PianoVerb2
- PSP SpringBox
- PSP 2Meters
- PSP X-Dither
- PSP L'otary
- PSP TripleMeter
- PSP MasterQ2
- PSP L'otary2
- PSP 2445
- PSP E27 (officially endorsed by Avedis audio)
- PSP stompDelay
- PSP B-Scanner
- PSP 2445 EMT (officially endorsed by EMT)
- PSP stompFilter
- PSP FETpressor
- PSP preQursor2
- PSP Nexcellence
