= Tortured Soul (disambiguation) =

Tortured Soul is a 1919 Italian silent film.

Tortured Soul may also refer to:

- Tortured Soul (band), jazz fusion band from New York
- Tortured Soul, a 2018 album by Black Sheep
- "Tortured Soul", an episode of The Bill
- Tortured Souls, a series of action figures
- Tortured Souls (magazine)
