= 360 Gamer =

British video game magazine, 2005–2013

- 360 Gamer magazine
- Editor: Stu Taylor (2005–2007); Simon Phillips (2007–2011); James Artaius and Ian Collen (2011–2013)
- Categories: Computer and video games
- Frequency: Three-weekly
- First issue: 27 October 2005
- Final issue: 2013
- Company: Uncooked Media
- Country: United Kingdom
- ISSN: 1747-8103
- OCLC: 225925307

360 Gamer was a UK-based video games magazine dedicated to the Xbox 360 console, established on 27 October 2005 by Uncooked Media (which previously published its sister PlayStation 3 magazine, Play Gamer, as well as the other titles FSM and Neo). This magazine is no longer published, and issue 145 dated 2013 was the final edition.

== Format ==
The 132-page magazine was the first Xbox 360 to be periodically published every three weeks, as opposed to the traditional monthly schedule preferred by its rivals (in 2009, 360 followed suit and changed to a three-weekly format). Since its launch, the magazine eschewed the “mags in bags” trend, popularised by rival publishers Future Publishing and Imagine Publishing (wherein a magazine is packaged in a sealed bag along with a cheaply produced DVD and/or tips book), focusing instead on fierce editorial as its USP. This allowed the magazine to retail at a much lower price point than its competitors (currently £3.99, having raised from £2.99 in July 2012).

== Staff ==
Launched and edited for the first two years by Stu Taylor, the current 360 Gamer staff are veterans of British videogames journalism, including editors James Artaius (former news editor of XBM and founding editor of FSM) and Ian Collen (formerly of Play Gamer and XBM), and staff writer Will Johnston (former news editor of Play and contributor to Play Gamer).

== Website ==
360 Gamer re-launched its official website in August 2011, offering its readers a variety of ways to purchase the magazine alongside editorial content not found in the magazine.

The site also featured content not usually found in the magazine. This included breaking news coverage, full transcriptions of interviews, competitions, community features and reviews of Xbox Live Arcade games and downloadable content.
