= MP3 (magazine) =

- Categories: Music
- Frequency: Monthly
- Publisher: Future plc
- Total circulation: 30,000 (predicted)
- First issue: May 2000
- Country: United Kingdom
- Based in: Bath
- Language: English

MP3 was a monthly magazine published by Future plc in the UK. It covered the topic of downloading MP3 digital audio files from the internet. Intended to capitalise on the popularity of the MP3 format and websites such as MP3.com and PeopleSound.com, it offered product reviews, guides, charts and advice. It sought to carve a niche in an area already covered by other music and computer magazines and offered a cover-mounted compact disc. Advertising space was sold by Future stablemate Computer Music, who shared the same target audience.
