= Start Art =

Magazine for beginner artists

Start Art was first published in 2005 by The Artists’ Publishing Company, based in Tenterden, Kent. Issue 1 was published in the Autumn of 2005; Issues 2 and 3 were published in 2006; and Issue 4 in 2007. It is a ‘how-to’ magazine for newcomers to drawing and painting, offering guidance and encouragement. The Artists' Publishing Company also publish Leisure Painter magazine, which offers practical advice to amateur painters; and The Artist, which is aimed towards the more experienced artist.

The magazine provides information on the materials needed to start painting and drawing, along with step-by-step demonstrations to work from. Each issue is intended as a complete course of basic instruction, using drawing and coloured pencils, water-soluble pencils, watercolour, acrylics and oil pastels. Experienced and popular tutors give guidance on how to paint landscapes, flowers, and household objects, as well as other subject matter.
