= The Theatrical Times =

Defunct magazine in London, England

Theatrical Times
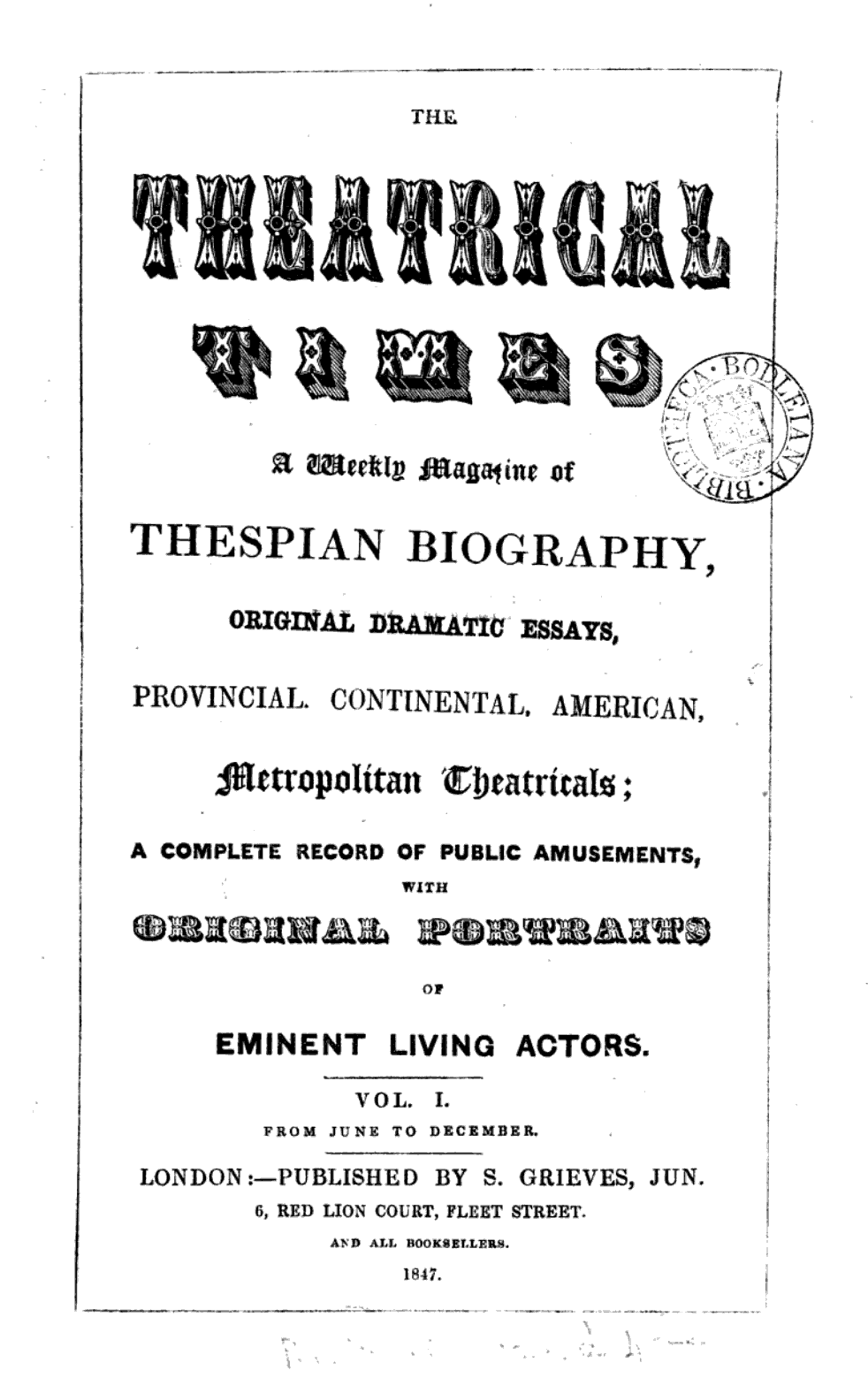
- Frequency: Weekly
- Format: Broadsheet
- Publisher: S. Grieves Jr.
- First issue: 13 June 1846
- Country: England
- Based in: London
- Language: English
- OCLC: 2949328

The Theatrical Times or simply Theatrical Times was a British theatrical magazine published in English and based in London, England in 1846. It operated as a weekly newspaper from 1846 to 1848.

== History ==
The first volume of The Theatrical Times was marked with the release of its first issue on 13 June 1846 in London, England. Described as "A weekly magazine of thespian biography, original dramatic essays, provincial, continental, American, metropolitan theatricals, a complete record of public amusements, with original portraits of eminent living actors", the publication was originally priced at one penny. The dedication of the opening volume of The Theatrical Times was to Henry West Betty. It was printed and published by S. Grieves Jr. out of a London office established on 6 Red Lion Court, Fleet St. By its December 5 publication, it was published twice a week. The 33rd and final edition of the 1846 volume was released on 26 December 1846.

The second volume of The Theatrical Times started with issue no. 36 on 9 January 1847, and concluded with no. 86 on 25 December 1847. This edition of The Theatrical Times marked a shift back to weekly publication, driven by issues related to distribution and delivery challenges. The publication aimed to keep readers updated on theatrical news while summarizing key weekly events for the theatrical community.

Volume three of The Theatrical Times covered 1 January to December 1848. The complete volume was published in 1848 by London publisher S. Grieves Jr.

== Gallery ==
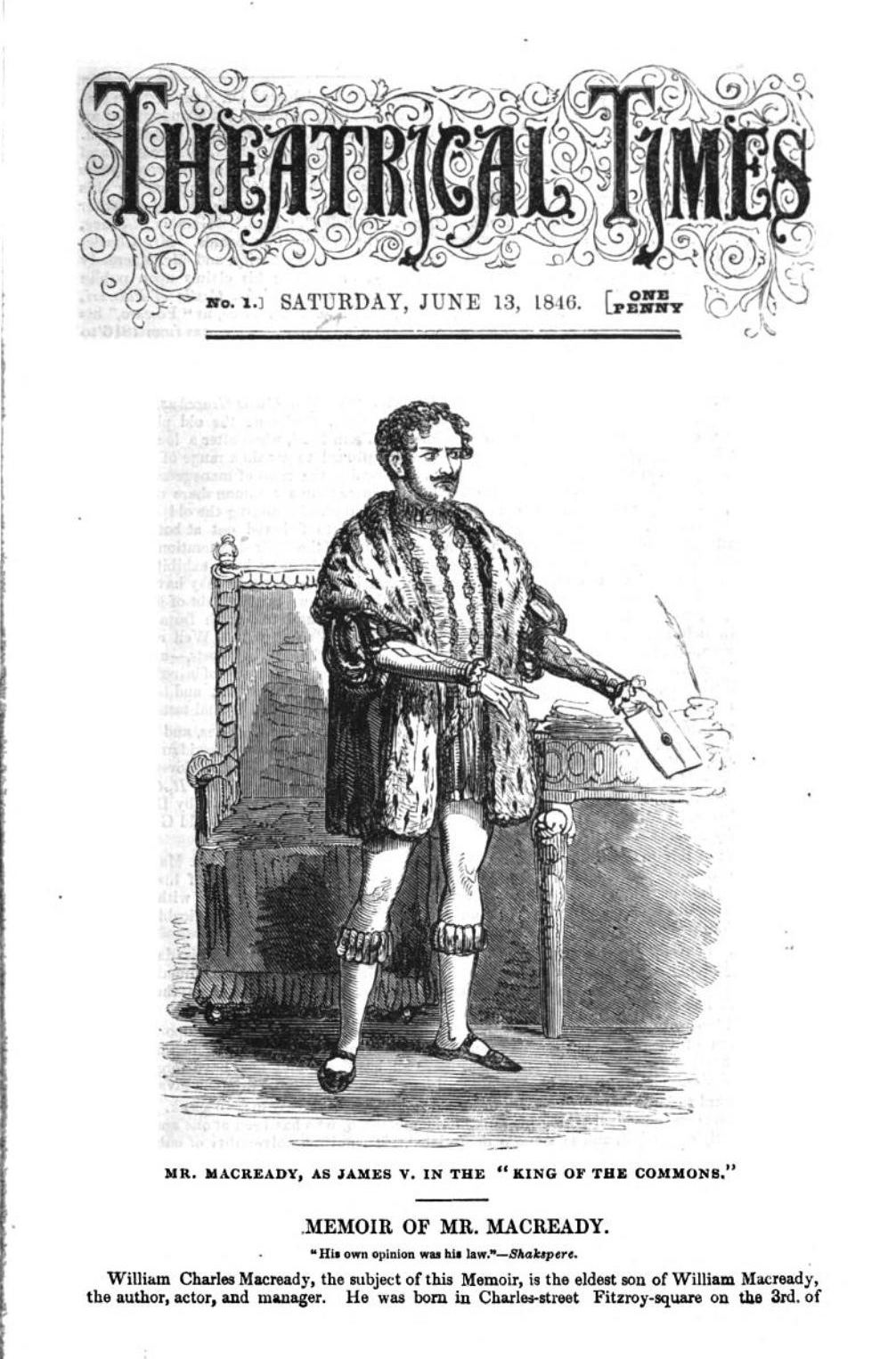
Cover of The Theatrical Times, Issue no. 1, June 13, 1846

== See also ==
List of magazines in the United Kingdom
