= List of spa towns in the United Kingdom =

The following is a list of current and former spa towns in the United Kingdom.

== England ==
=== Derbyshire ===
- Buxton
- Matlock
- Matlock Bath

=== Worcestershire ===
- Droitwich Spa
- Malvern
- Tenbury Wells

=== Yorkshire ===
- Askern, South Yorkshire
- Boston Spa, West Yorkshire
- Harrogate, North Yorkshire
- Ilkley, West Yorkshire
- Knaresborough, North Yorkshire

=== Other ===
- Bath, Somerset
- Cheltenham, Gloucestershire
- Church Stretton, Shropshire
- Dorton Spa, Buckinghamshire
- Epsom, Surrey
- Royal Leamington Spa, Warwickshire
- Royal Tunbridge Wells, Kent
- Shearsby, Leicestershire

== Wales ==
- Builth Wells
- Llandrindod Wells
- Llangammarch Wells
- Llanwrtyd Wells

== Former spa towns ==
=== England ===
- Ashby-de-la-Zouch, Leicestershire
- Bakewell, Derbyshire
- Baslow, Derbyshire
- Clifton/Hotwells, Bristol
- Ewell, Surrey
- Goathland, North Yorkshire
- Hartlepool, County Durham
- Hockley, Essex
- Hovingham, North Yorkshire
- Leeds, West Yorkshire
- Melksham, Wiltshire
- Nantwich, Cheshire
- Ossett, West Yorkshire
- Ripon, North Yorkshire
- Scarborough, North Yorkshire (Note: But see The Spa, Scarborough.)
- Stoney Middleton, Derbyshire
- Woodhall Spa, Lincolnshire
- Wigan, Greater Manchester
- Wirksworth, Derbyshire

=== Scotland ===
- Bridge of Allan, Stirling (formerly in Stirlingshire)
- Crieff, Perth and Kinross (formerly in Perthshire)
- Dunblane, Stirling (formerly in Perthshire)
- Moffat, Dumfries and Galloway (formerly in Dumfriesshire)
- Peebles, Scottish Borders (formerly in Peeblesshire)
- Rothesay, Rothesay, Argyll and Bute (formerly in the County of Bute)
- Strathpeffer, Ross and Cromarty (formerly in Ross-shire)

=== Wales ===
- Taff's Well Thermal Spring, near Cardiff
- Chalybeate springs, near Trefriw; the village was promoted in the first half of the 20th century as Trefriw Spa

== See also ==
- List of spa towns
