= Five Star Magazine =

Five Star Magazine is an annual publication and digital luxury magazine first published in Scotland in 2010. The magazine covers luxury travel, and luxury lifestyle targeting the super wealthy. The magazine is Glasgow based but has a global audience and has received a number of international awards since its first year of creation. Brazilian born and founder Renata Parolari Fernandes is still the editor.

== See also ==
- List of magazines published in Scotland
- List of magazines in the United Kingdom
