= Motor Boats Monthly =

Magazine about motor boats

- Editor: Carl Richardson
- Categories: Motorboat
- Frequency: Monthly
- Circulation: 10,017 (ABC Jan - Dec 2013)
- Publisher: IPC Media
- Founder: Emrhys Barrell; Jeremy Paxton
- Founded: 1987
- Final issue: October 2014
- Country: United Kingdom
- Language: English
- Website: Motor Boats Monthly

Motor Boats Monthly was a monthly magazine about motorboats published by IPC Media and is listed in the Writers' & Artists' Yearbook 2014.

== History and profile ==
Motor Boats Monthly was launched in 1987. The founders were Emrhys Barrell and Jeremy Paxton. Its first editor was Emrhys Barrell and its final editor Rob Peake. During the 1990s and noughties Motor Boats Monthly was Britain's best-selling motor boating magazine, hitting record ABC figures between 2005 and 2009 under the editorship of first Simon Collis, then Carl Richardson. Following the recession and a final change of editor, the magazine ended its print in October 2014.
