= Well Red magazine =

Magazine for Liverpool Football Club, 2010–2013

- Front cover in April 2010, featuring Bill Shankly
- Categories: Football
- Frequency: Bi-monthly
- First issue: April 2010
- Final issue: December 2013
- Country: United Kingdom
- Language: English

Well Red magazine was a bi-monthly 64-page magazine that "tackles matters on and off the pitch at Liverpool F.C.". It was launched in April 2010 and its final issue was December 2013.

Each issue of Well Red includes contributions from readers and leading football journalists and authors.

Contributors so far have included Dion Fanning (Irish Sunday Independent), Tony Barrett (The Times), Rory Smith (The Telegraph), Tony Evans (The Times), Dave Kirby (playwright, writer and poet), Paul Tomkins (author of eight Liverpool books), Jamie Casey (Sky Sports) and Tony Teasdale (Arena, Esquire).

The magazine has been referenced by mainstream media sources including The Mirror and BBC Sport.
