= Asbri =

Welsh pop magazine

Asbri (meaning Vivacity in English) was a Welsh language pop magazine started in 1969. It was the first Welsh pop magazine. The magazine was based in Carmarthen and was published on a monthly basis. It folded in 1978 after publishing a total of thirty-three issues.
