= Sales Promotion (magazine) =

UK business-to-business monthly magazine

Sales Promotion magazine is a monthly UK business-to-business magazine for people working in marketing.

== History ==
It was launched in 1989 by Brainstorm Publishing, based in Hertford. It was then purchased in 1991 by Marketlink Publishing, based in Bishops Stortford, Hertfordshire, and latterly Saffron Walden, Essex. It remained part of the company’s portfolio after it was acquired by Eastern Counties Newspaper Group (ECNG) in 1999 for £5 million. When ECNG became Archant in 2002, the division publishing Sales Promotion changed its name from Market Link to Archant Specialist.

Archant sold Sales Promotion magazine to Cambridgeshire-based Greenhill Publishing in 2005. The title was then bought by a newly formed company, Sales Promotion Publishing, in 2007. It is published in partnership with the UK trade association, the Institute of Sales Promotion.

The magazine is currently published 11 times a year, and distributed to a controlled circulation of 8,000 senior people working in marketing and sales, including marketing agencies. It covers marketing through all media channels including digital, direct mail and experiential marketing as well as staff and channel-partner motivation.

Editors of the magazine have included Paul Rowney (founder) Kathryn Dale, Clare Irvin, Janine Hill, Mandy Thatcher, Lisa Burn, Kathryn Roberts, Jerry Glenwright and Gill Crawley, Matt Sullivan, Mark Ludmon and Martin Croft. They have regularly worked with guest editors drawn from the marketing community.
