= Farmers Guide =

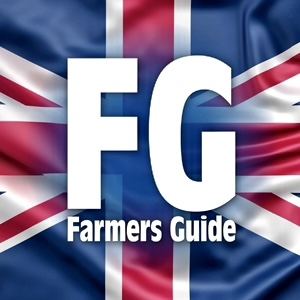
- Categories: Agriculture and Farming
- Frequency: Monthly
- Circulation: 30,000
- Publisher: Early Bird Farming Publications Ltd
- Founder: Doug Potts
- Founded: 1979
- Country: England
- Based in: Ipswich, Suffolk
- Language: English
- Website: https://www.farmersguide.co.uk
- ISSN: 2053-5414

Farmers Guide is the UK's leading monthly farming magazine, providing the English agricultural industry with advertising both for its readers and their suppliers. Farmers Guide is a family-owned publishing business. Founded in 1979 Farmers Guide was initially mailed free and direct to farmers and agricultural contractors in Suffolk, Norfolk, Essex and Cambs. It is now national and is mailed free and direct to 30,000+ farmers, decision-makers, contractors and suppliers across the UK. With a huge, growing digital presence and providing free FarmAds for every agricultural reader.

== History ==
The Farmers Guide was founded by Doug Potts in 1979 and has remained family run, now managed by his daughter and grandson, Julie and Greg Goulding. The magazine features articles on arable, livestock and machinery, as well as general agricultural interest, information, and political comment. Farmers Guide is also noted for its classified section FarmAds, which allows farmers to buy and sell used machinery and goods for free.

Launched in September 1979, it originally held the full title of The East Anglian Farmers Guide. At the time there were 1.8 million hectares of land devoted to arable cultivation, representing one-third of the total agricultural land in England and Wales. Half of the wheat crop was grown in East Anglia, together with more than 40% of potatoes, 63% of vining peas, and 72% of sugar beets, field beans, and dried peas. The magazine was launched for East Anglian farmers, keeping them up to date on local and national news as well as giving them space to place classified ads.

At the time most newspapers in rural areas produced weekly supplements for their farmer readers. The Eastern Daily Press had produced a publication in 1959 designed to cover seven counties, but this ceased in 1970. The Farmers Guardian, produced in the west, was also a byproduct of a newspaper group and was produced in newspaper format, but it included coverage of the livestock industry reflecting the area it served. The NFU produced a number of county publications comprising union news, mostly in the small A5 format.

The East Anglian Farmers Guide, covering Norfolk, Suffolk, Essex, and Cambridgeshire, took a major step by being the first to offer the A4 magazine format on a local basis and to offer farmers free advertising for equipment sold off the farm.

The popularity of the magazine and its classified section meant that it soon grew beyond the boundaries of the 4 counties, now distributing to farmers around the world. Farmers Guide is primarily funded by advertising and has remained free to UK farm decision makers. Those that don't qualify, or who are based internationally can receive the magazine for the cost of postage.

The Farmers Guide now prints 30,000 copies and has over 260,000 reading for free online. As of 2021 Farmers Guide is the only ABC audited farming magazine with a growing circulation

Farmers Guide had been closely involved in the annual Power in Action event, organised by the Suffolk Farm Machinery Club. Otley was the home of Power in Action until a change in farming policy by its hosts meant that the 2005 event was the last to be held on that site. It was feared that the loss of the Otley venue would also spell the end of the event, but Farmers Guide became joint organiser with the Suffolk Farm Machinery Club and a new site was identified. With the 2007 Power in Action, which took place at Melford Park Farm, Alpheton, Suffolk, in September 2007, the event entered a new phase its history.

Over the past several years the magazine has also worked on digital content, alongside offering the magazine to read online each month their website and social media is kept up to date with news. They have amassed 25,000 social media followers and 2.5 million YouTube views, whilst keeping the printed magazine in circulation.

The magazine celebrated its 500th issue in April 2021.

In 2021 Farmers Guide expanded its offering even further by launching FarmHub, a directory specifically designed for farmers.
