= The Vineyard (magazine) =

The Vineyard was a British periodical published in London beginning in 1910. Describing itself as "A Monthly Magazine devoted to the Literature of Peasant Life", it was primarily dedicated to non-fiction, supplemented by works of fiction and poetry.

Originally published monthly, the magazine went on hiatus during World War I, after the September 1914 issue. It resumed quarterly publication with a Christmas 1918 issue, before ceasing again two years later, in September 1920. It returned after several months under the name The Country Heart, but permanently ceased publication at the end of 1922.

The magazine was published by A.C. Fifield, and was edited by Maude Egerton King for most of its publication history.

One of the authors featured in The Vineyard was Nobel Prize winner Selma Lagerlöf, whose "Liliecrona's Home" was included as a serial in 1913.
