= Bristol in Stereo =

Bristol Live Magazine
- Editor: Loki Lillistone
- Categories: Music
- First issue: February 2012
- Country: United Kingdom
- Based in: Bristol
- Language: English
- Website: www.bristolinstereo.com

Bristol in Stereo is a print magazine offering interviews, reviews, and live music listings for the city of Bristol.

Founded in February 2012 as part of music collective, Fear Of Fiction, before branching off as separate entity Bristol Live Magazine, it rebranded in 2018 to Bristol in Stereo in line with sister magazine, London in Stereo.

It publishes one print issue per month, as well as online content from Monday to Friday. Content is locally focused, with cover acts ranging from Bristolian artists to international bands performing in the city that month.

In February 2013, the editorial team conferred with London mailing service and email service London In Stereo to launch a print monthly of the same name.

In its other capacities, the organisation has also held city music festivals and released limited edition CDs and records.
