= The Servant's Magazine =

Defunct monthly magazine

The Servant's Magazine was published monthly in England from 1838 until 1869. Priced at one penny, its mission was to provide "improving reading for servant girls". Probably bought more by the mistress of the house for distribution to her servants than by the servants themselves, its tone was "patronizing and austerely evangelical". Among the advice contained within its pages was that servants should never read novels, should study the Bible regularly, and should be faithful to their employers, not seeking employment elsewhere "unless the Lord tells you it will be for your soul's good".
