= What Satellite and Digital TV =

UK TV magazine

- What Satellite and Digital TV (May 2007)
- Editor: Alex Lane
- Frequency: Monthly then Four weekly
- First issue: May 1986
- Final issue: November 2014
- Company: MyHobbyStore
- Country: United Kingdom
- Based in: London
- Language: English
- Website: www.wotsat.com
- ISSN: 1747-1362

What Satellite and Digital TV was a satellite, terrestrial, cable and broadband television magazine published monthly in the United Kingdom by MyHobbyStore. Although the magazine was primarily targeted for the UK market, it was also sold in Europe, Africa and the Middle East.

== History ==
The magazine was originally launched as What Satellite by WV Publications in May 1986, as an eight-page monthly supplement with What Video magazine

It became a monthly magazine in May 1989, following the launch of the first Astra satellite and Sky TV, and changed its name to What Satellite TV for the October 1992 issue. WV Publications was purchased by Highbury House Communications plc in 1998, which published the title until Summer 2005 when Future Publishing acquired What Satellite TV along with the majority of the Highbury House specialist consumer titles for £30.5 million. What Satellite TV focused exclusively on satellite television, including the Astra and Eutelsat satellites and the Sky Digital platform until June 2002 when it also started to cover digital terrestrial television, including ITV Digital, Freeview and Top Up TV and was renamed What Satellite and Digital TV. It covered all aspects of digital TV, including broadband and internet-delivered services such as Virgin Media, BT Vision, TalkTalk TV, the BBC iPlayer and 4oD, and digital radio. The magazine incorporated listings for many years, and had done since early editions. It also included features on upcoming TV shows, film reviews and interviews.

In April 2002, What Satellite and Digital TV was the first magazine to discover secret military broadcasts of NATO spy planes over Bosnia, broadcast and received using a one-metre satellite dish The United States encrypted the transmissions after the security breach was discovered.

The magazine was merged with sister title Satellite TV Monthly (formerly known as Satellite TV Europe, which was purchased by Highbury in 2001) when that magazine ceased publication in 2005; starting with the June 2005 issue.

The May 2007 issue of What Satellite and Digital TV marked the 250th issue of the magazine's publication.

In July 2011, Future Publishing announced its intention to either sell or close the magazine alongside other publications due to a slump in profits. On 11 October 2011, it was announced that MyHobbyStore had purchased the magazine along with sister publications Hi-Fi Choice and Home Cinema Choice.

In October and November 2014 greatly reduced content was produced (32 pages) plus a free Hi-Fi Choice (sister publication) and subscriptions were no longer accepted.

The November issue was the last and the website redirected to Home Cinema Choice's website.

== Features ==
The magazine featured news, a letters page, reviews on satellite and terrestrial television set-top boxes, satellite dishes and gadgets, in depth features on satellite and terrestrial television technology as well as satellite television channel line-up's by satellite and TV listings, plus Certificate X, an article on censorship in the media, specifically, but not exclusively dealing with the adult satellite television industry.

First issue of What Satellite and Digital TV (Jun 2002) following its rebrand from What Sateliite TV
