= The Authors' Circular =

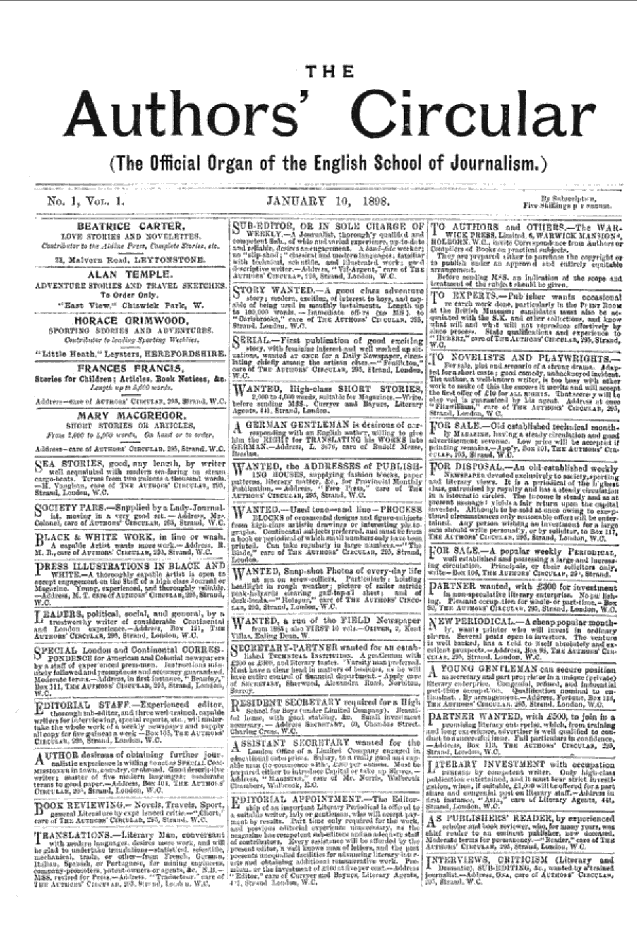
- Front page of the Authors' Circular 10 January 1898
- Editor: Charles Norris
- Categories: journalism, publishing
- Frequency: monthly
- First issue: January 10, 1898
- Final issue: 1898
- Country: United Kingdom
- Based in: 295 Strand, London, W. C.
- Language: English

The Authors' Circular was a short-lived monthly publication of 16 pages running from January to April 1898. It was subtitled the Official Organ of the English School of Journalism. It aimed to "foster business relations between those who write and those who publish," reflecting the increased professionalization of journalism. Advice on pitching to editors and defending intellectual property, gossip about the literary scene, insight into the means by which editors selected copy for publication, and a correspondence section in which such issues were discussed made up the bulk of the magazine. The syllabus for the English School of Journalism (which prepared students for the examinations of the Institute of Journalists was printed in each issue, giving insight into the practical art of journalism as it was then conceived. Early in 1898, Charles Norris, secretary of the English School of Journalism, who was intimately involved in the production of its journal, died which destabilised the publication and its continuation.
