= Scootering (British magazine) =

- Editor: 'Stan' Bates
- Former editors: Dan Clare (2016–2021), Andy Gillard (2003–2016), Stuart Lanning (1991–2002), Steve Berry (1990), Stuart Lanning (1989–1990), Gareth Brown (1987–89), Mike Roberts (1985–87)
- Categories: Motorcycling
- Frequency: Monthly
- Circulation: 79,954
- Publisher: Morton's Media Group
- Founded: 1985
- Country: UK
- Based in: Horncastle
- Language: English
- Website: Scootering
- ISSN: 0268-7194

Scootering is a British magazine published by the Morton's Media Group, and covers classic scooters, primarily Vespa and Lambretta, the people who ride them, and products of interest to scooterists.

== History and profile ==
The first issue of Scootering was published by Myatt McFarlene in May 1985 with Mike Roberts as the editor. After Mike's death in 1987 Gareth Brown became editor. In 1989 Myatt McFarelne purchased Scooter Scene magazine from Stuart Lanning and made Lanning the editor of the combined magazines. Lanning eventually bought the title from Myatt Mcfarelene and continued to publish it himself as 'Scootering Publications' until 2002.

Lanning sold the title to Mortons Media Group in January 2003 and former features writer Andy Gillard became editor. In January 2016 Gillard resigned after 18 years at Scootering magazine, 13 of those years as editor – the longest serving in the magazine's history. Dan Clare, owner of Scooterotica was subsequently employed as an editor. In October 2021 Dan Clare left the magazine to join The Dalesman magazine. The current editor is 'Stan' Bates, an enthusiastic scooterist who had been writing for the publication as a freelancer since 2016.

== Circulation ==
Scootering is published in the UK and is sold worldwide with specific distribution in countries such as New Zealand, US and Australia. The magazine has a self-promoted circulation rate-base of 79,954 but 'Scootering' does not belong to ABC (Audit Bureau of Circulation), the industry body for media measurement. These figures quoted are the publishers 'claimed' readership figures back in 2010, an estimate of how many people might see a copy of the magazine.

Scootering also provides an electronic archive of back-issues through Zinio.
