= Love it! =

British women's magazine

love it!
- Editor: Paul Carter
- Categories: Real life
- Frequency: Weekly
- Circulation: 112,695 (ABC Jul – Dec 2013); Print and digital editions.
- First issue: 7 February 2006
- Company: ACH Publishing
- Country: United Kingdom
- Language: English
- Website: www.loveitmagazine.co.uk

love it! is a weekly magazine produced in the UK. It was launched on 7 February 2006 by News Magazines Ltd, News International's magazine division.

Entering into the real life category, it is aimed at working-class women aged 18–35, combining inspirational real-life stories with fashion, beauty, travel, crime, health, reviews, food, competitions and quizzes.

The magazine was heavily promoted by The Sun, News International's daily tabloid newspaper.

== Change of ownership ==
The magazine was sold to Hubert Burda Media in December 2008. It was subsequently bought out by Pep Publishing in 2012, and ACH Publishing in August 2015.
