= The Realist (British magazine) =

The Realist was a short lived monthly British magazine first published in March 1929 which brought together many intellectuals from that era. It was dedicated to Scientific Humanism and carried a distinctive pale orange cover. It closed in January 1930, a victim of the Great Depression.

It was founded in 1928 by the political scientist George Catlin and Major A. G. Church, then assistant editor of Nature, who became its editor. It was backed by Lord Melchett and published by Macmillan. The literary editor was the then little-known philosopher Gerald Heard.

Contributors included, Arnold Bennett, H. G. Wells, Sir Richard Gregory, J. B. S. Haldane, Bronisław Malinowski, Herbert Read, Julian Huxley, Aldous Huxley, Sir Frank Baines, H. J. Laski and Rebecca West.

Its editorial meetings were held at the London restaurant, Kettners.

The founders hoped to find a market for an intellectual monthly along similar lines to the American Harper's Magazine.
