= British Railways Illustrated =

British monthly railway magazine

- Categories: Rail transport
- Frequency: Monthly
- Publisher: Irwell Press
- First issue: 1991; 35 years ago
- Country: United Kingdom
- Website: BRILL
- ISSN: 0961-8244

British Railways Illustrated is a British monthly railway magazine published by Irwell Press. It is aimed at railway enthusiasts particularly interested in the period 1919 to 1968. The title is often referred to by readers and in the magazine as "BRILL".

== Extras ==
Occasionally, British Railways Illustrated publishes supplements or special editions. These may cover a particular region, a class of locomotive or a period in time.
