= BlueSci =

Student-produced science magazine of the University of Cambridge

- Type: Termly magazine
- Format: Compact
- Owner: Cambridge University Science Productions
- Founder(s): Lauri Ora, Risto Paju, Rend Platings
- President: Kristen Burgess
- Founded: 2001
- Political alignment: None
- Headquarters: CUSU Offices, Old Examination Hall, Free School Lane, Cambridge, CB2 3RF, UK
- Circulation: Up to 5,000
- ISSN: 1748-6920
- Website: www.bluesci.co.uk

BlueSci is the oldest of the University of Cambridge's student-run science magazines. It was first created as a science and technology news website in October 2000 by Lauri Ora, Risto Paju and Rend Platings and has been published in its current form continuously since 2004. It is published at the beginning of each term during the University of Cambridge's academic year. BlueSci's editors are voluntary and not paid, and are typically appointed on a yearly basis. They are supported by a permanent member, Senior Treasurer Dr. Björn Haßler, the founding president of Cambridge University Science Productions. BlueSci was originally published in a digital format in 2001. It has since become a recognised brand, and for Issue 11 BlueSci was adopted as the overall name for the society.

Production of the magazine is currently based at the CUSU Offices on the New Museums Site. Previously, they were based in the Varsity premises for over 10 years. The move to the new offices occurred in April 2014.
