= Night Magazine =

- Type: Business magazine
- Format: Paper and online magazine
- Owner: Mondiale Publishing
- Editor: Rachel Esson
- Founded: 1984
- Ceased publication: 2009
- Language: English
- Headquarters: Stockport, Greater Manchester, UK
- Circulation: 10,499 (1 Jul 2007 – 30 Jun 2008)
- ISSN: 1476-4059
- Website: NIGHT Magazine

Established in 1984, and published monthly by Mondiale Publishing Ltd, NIGHT magazine covered operational, technical and design developments within bars, clubs, student unions, casinos and live venues across the UK. Through its partnership with nightclub association Noctis and research arm CGA, the magazine was able to provide legal, political and operational guidance alongside information from installers, manufacturers and service providers working within the nightclub industry. The magazine also provided an overview of the culture and community of clubbing, conducting interviews with key industry figures and artists, creating features and commissioning its own photography.

Its website, launched in June 2007, carried all the information from the magazine, as well as daily news, technology and drinks bulletins.

NIGHT magazine hosted an annual awards night entitled 'NIGHT presents... the beda's'. The event aimed to recognise high standards of UK nightclub operation, design and technology.

NIGHT magazine had an ABC certified circulation of 10,499 copies between 1 July 2007 and 30 June 2008.

In 2009, NIGHT magazine ended publication.
