= British Film (magazine) =

- Editor: Terence Doyle
- Categories: Cinema of the United Kingdom
- Circulation: Online
- First issue: June 2005
- Final issue: 2007
- Country: United Kingdom
- Language: English
- Website: was Britishfilmmagazine.com

British Film was a publication covering British film industry, which was read by hundreds of people weekly. The magazine began as a print publication in 2005 before the launch of the online version in 2007. Both the print and online editions closed following the departure of founder Terence Doyle.

== History ==
The magazine was conceived in autumn 2002 but the idea received little support at Cannes 2003.

British Film Magazine launched in London and Cannes 2005. Following three years of difficult development, it was a 108-page glossy premiere issue in March 2005, with 10,000 copies printed. That issue was sold in independent shops, specialist film outlets and Borders bookshops in the main cities throughout the UK. Some problems were encountered as the issue bore the cover date of June 2005 instead of Summer 2005, so shops that sold out waited for the next issue to arrive rather than order more copies of the premiere issue.

Two years later, at the Cannes Film Festival in May 2007, the online version was launched. It is read by hundreds of people in up to 50 countries weekly.

Both the print magazine and online magazine are now closed as founder Terence Doyle has stepped away from the company. The website has now been taken over by a different, unconnected business.

== Regular Features ==
British Film Magazine is designed to report on every new British film on general release in Britain and all films released in Britain with major British talent involved, usually at directors or lead actor. It also reports on such films in production; on small budget British independent films and shorts, on training programmes in Britain and on British film or talent on DVDs.
