= Planet PC =

UK magazine

- Cover of the first issue of Planet PC
- Editor: David Bradley
- Categories: Video games, computing, technology
- Frequency: Monthly
- Circulation: 20,181 (2000)
- Publisher: James Binns
- First issue: 1 December 1999
- Company: Future plc
- Country: United Kingdom
- Based in: Bath, Somerset
- Language: English
- ISSN: 1468-7836
- OCLC: 226102215

Planet PC was a British PC gaming magazine aimed at pre-teens, first published in December 1999. It was issued monthly by Future plc in Bath, Somerset, and was backed by a marketing budget of £50 thousand. Similar magazines published by Future included PC Format, for which Planet PC was hoped to be a feeder. Planet PC cost £2.95 per issue, with its target market being eight-to-twelve-year-old male PC users. During the year 2000, the magazine had a circulation of 20,181. Its editor was David Bradley, its associate editor was Chris James, and its publisher was James Binns. In October 1999, two months before the release of the first issue, Binns explained that Planet PC would fill a gap seen as "too old and ... too expensive for [the] younger market".

Every issue of Planet PC came with a free CD that featured several game demos. Often, reviews of the games that were featured on the CD were included within the magazine. Each issue would also include gaming news, tips, readers' letters, readers' game reviews, comics, competitions, and full-size posters. The first three editions of Planet PC contained an exclusive Top Trumps trading card game. Issue nine was released with four different covers, each depicting a different character from the television series Pokémon: Charizard, Ash Ketchum & Pikachu, Squirtle or Team Rocket.
