= Welsh Living =

- Editor: Ed Pereira
- Categories: Lifestyle magazine
- Frequency: Bi-monthly
- Founded: 2006
- Company: Pear Media
- Country: United Kingdom (Origin)
- Website: www.welshliving.com

Welsh Living is a national bi-monthly home and lifestyle magazine. The magazine began publication in 2006 in the United Kingdom. Founded by Eduardo Pereira, the magazine is predominantly based on homes, gardens, life and style. It is part of Pear Media. Circulation is achieved through distribution at independent news-stand outlets as well as Marks and Spencer, Waitrose, Sainsbury's, WH Smith and other retail outlets.
