= Shooting Gazette =

British magazine

- Cover of the final issue (May 2021)
- Categories: sports magazine
- Frequency: Monthly
- Circulation: 12,532 (ABC Jan - Dec 2013); Print and digital editions.
- First issue: 1989
- Final issue: May 2021
- Company: Future plc
- Country: United Kingdom
- Based in: Stamford, Lincolnshire
- Language: English
- Website: www.shootinggazette.co.uk
- ISSN: 0957-4182

Shooting Gazette was a monthly field sports magazine published by Future plc.

Shooting Gazette covered all aspects of driven shooting, both in the UK and abroad. It includes advice on gamekeeping, regular interviews with leading figures in the shooting industry, reviews for new shotguns, shooting clothing, and equipment. A gundog section offers advice on training, breeding, and reporting gundog trials around the country.

Shooting Gazette was the official magazine of the Countryside Alliance Shooting Campaign.

Will Hetherington has been the editor since July 2004.

== History ==
Founded in Lincolnshire in 1989, originally as a quarterly publication, the magazine, then called The Shooting Gazette, became a bi-monthly in October/November of that year. EMAP traded the title to IPC Media in 1996 in exchange for Classic Cars.

The magazine was discontinued by its owner Future plc (which acquired previous owner TI Media in 2020) in May 2021.
