= Taff's Well Thermal Spring =

Thermal spring in Wales

- Ffynnon Taf (Welsh)
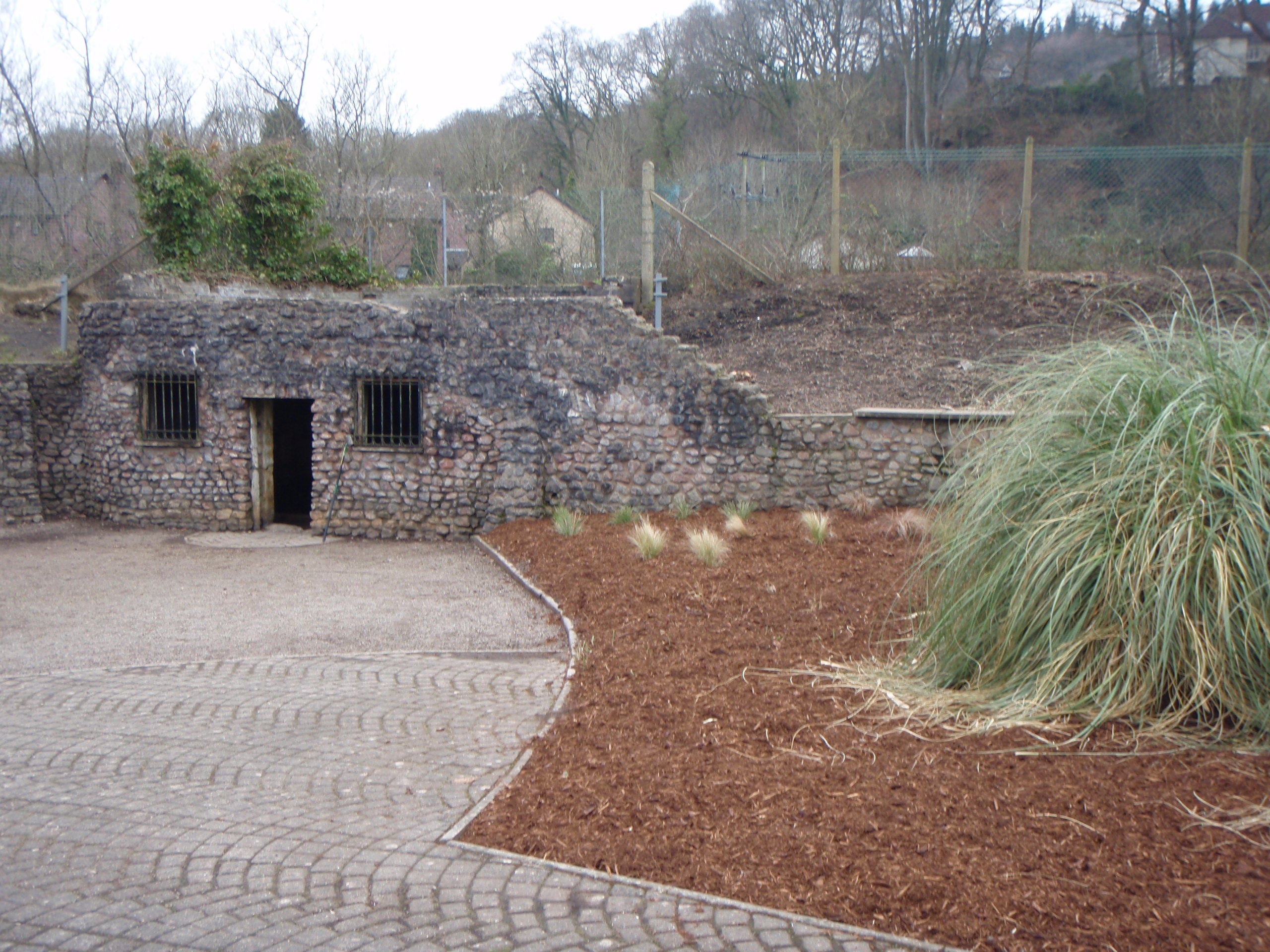
- Taff's Well Thermal Spring

- Location within Wales
- Location: Wales
- Coordinates: 51.544748°N 3.271488°W grid reference ST1192583639

Taff's Well thermal spring is in Taff's Well (Welsh: Ffynnon Taf) north of Cardiff, south Wales (ST11928363) at an elevation of about 30 metres (100 ft). It is the only thermal spring in Wales. The spring emerges on the eastern bank of the River Taff and has been contained within a brick well structure. Access is via Taff's Well park, a public park owned and maintained by Rhondda Cynon Taff Council.

The spring is enclosed inside a well and stone building constructed in the 19th century. The well built to contain the spring waters is brick-lined and approximately 4 metres (13 ft) deep. The building has an internal dimension of 5.3 by 3.9 metres (17 ft × 13 ft), and water fills this area. A brick-built spiral staircase is incorporated in the inside of the well. There is one visible overflow pipe, which emerges several metres to the west of the spring on the bank of the River Taff.

A recent conceptual model considers that the water has journeyed from the limestone outcrops on the north crop of the coalfield over a period of at least five thousand years, but possibly ten thousand.

The site is a registered Regionally Important Geological Site and a Grade II listed building.

== History ==
The early history of Taff's Well spring is not documented; in fact the first recorded visit to the spring was in 1760 by the chemist D. W. Linden. Roman settlements and roads occur throughout the Taff Valley but there is no evidence that the Romans knew about, or used the spring. A local tradition suggested that a flood in 1799 had uncovered Roman masonry at the site; however, no trace of the masonry survives today, and Natur Cymru state there is no evidence of Roman activity at the site. Ffynnon Dwym ("tepid well") was an alternative name for the well.

19th-century dictionaries mention the reported medicinal properties of the water, especially for the cure of rheumatism. The spring reached its height of popularity during the mid- to late 1800s, visitors arriving in the village in large numbers hoping to cure their ailments.

The following excerpt is from The Book of South Wales the Wye and the Coast, published in 1861. It is a description of people's beliefs in the healing powers of holy wells in the 19th century.

At all hours of the day and night there are ailing and decrepit persons, men, women, and children, waiting "a turn" to bathe. Women must bathe here as well as men, and when a bonnet is hung on the outside, it is a sign that the gentler sex have possession. As but two, or at most three can find room in the bath inside, it is obvious that persons seeking relief must wait sometimes for hours before they obtain right of entrance. Yet it would be very easy to produce larger accommodation; for as we have observed there are several other springs at hand,. That might be at little cost fitted up for bathers. These bathers however are of the poorer classes and although we believe a fee is paid by them to the farmer who owns the ground, there is little prospect of any better accommodation until some practically minded benevolent person interferes to promote the comfort and restore the health of humble visitors to the Well.

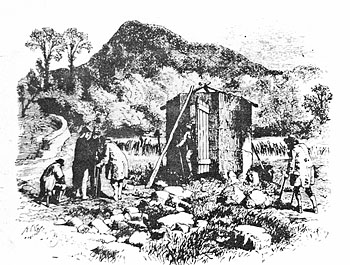
History: Taff's Well Etching prior to 1861

Hall concluded that the waters relieved and occasionally cured chronic disorders, citing a young man who came as a cripple and left after a fortnight's bathing able "to run about the green meadow and enjoy life." Another patient was described, an Irishman who was unable to move without the aid of crutches.

"But how" we inquired, "how is it that with such a number of holy wells in your own country you leave them and come to St. Taff to be cured?"

"Because I'm for justice to ould Ireland. Does your honour think that when I had the misfortune to take up with the rhumatis in this country, I'd go bothering my own saints to give me the cure? I'd scorn it ! hav'n't they enough to do with their own blind and bochers, without bein' put upon to do the work that belongs to St. Taff ? It was down in his mines I got it, and it's his duty to see me righted; and so he will, with God's help someday. If the gorsoons would let me alone, I'd be a dale healthier meeself; but aftermee dip in the well, when I come down here to go over mee bades, and say 'God be wid ould times,' and think of where mee heart lies bleedin,' – of the pleasant places, the singing strames and singing birds, and one that is singing sweeter than either up there now!

The growing popularity of Taff's Well spring as a tourist destination was again reported in 1877 by the chemist J. W. Thomas who said "the well waters have long since obtained some celebrity, especially the well water as a curative agent for rheumatism." Thomas concludes "we do not feel encouraged by this story (which, by the way, we rather fancy we have heard before) to insist very much upon the curative properties of the Water of Taff's Well."

During the 19th century, a weir was constructed across the River Taff. This caused the widening of the river, which moved eastwards towards the spring with floodwaters often covering the spring.

The well building fell into disrepair at the beginning of World War I, and in 1929 the Taffs Well villagers decided to repair the well and it re-opened in 1930 complete with a small swimming pool. It was around this time that the famous travel writer H. V. Morton visited the well, dedicating several pages of his 1932 book to it. A large flood in the 1950s caused the pool, and well, to fall into disuse once again. In 1978 the well's waters were used to rescue the village bowling greens from drought. It was not until the 1990s that a redevelopment of the area was undertaken by Rhondda Cynnon Taff Council.

Taff's Well spring is not currently used for water supply or recreational use. The council had plans to reinstate the spring and to develop it as a tourist attraction but these have not been fully realised.

== The Grey Lady of Taff's Well ==
Taff's Well is not considered to be a holy well, although there are many of these in Wales. The best-known myth or legend associated with the spring (apart from its healing properties) is that of the "Grey Lady":

A lady robed in grey frequently visited this well, and many people testified to having seen her in the twilight wandering along the banks of the river near the spring, or going on to the ferry under the Garth Mountain. Stories about this mysterious lady were handed down from father to son. The last was to the effect that about seventy or eighty years ago the woman in grey beckoned a man who had just been getting some of the water. He put his pitcher down and asked what he could do for her. She asked him to hold her tight by both hands until she requested him to release her. The man did as he was bidden. He began to think it a long time before she bade him cease his grip, when a "stabbing pain" caught him in his side and with a sharp cry he loosed his hold. "Alas! I shall remain in bondage for another hundred years, and then I must get a woman with steady hands and better than yours to hold me." She vanished and was never seen again."

== Geology ==
Taff's Well spring emerges from the southern limb of the south Wales Coalfield, Carboniferous "Millstone Grit" (Marros Group) occurs in the immediate area of the Taff's Well thermal spring. The underlying Carboniferous Limestone can be seen outcropping just south of Taff's Well. The underlying Devonian Old Red Sandstone outcrops over 2 kilometres (1.2 mi) southeast, just north of the M4 motorway.

The superficial geology in the area of the Taff's Well spring comprises an unknown thickness of river alluvium and river terrace deposits.

The Taff's Well sub-unit is bound to the southwest by the Tongwynlais or Taff's Well Fault, which runs north–south, crossing the River Taff, and passing very close to the spring. The Taff's Well Fault is a continuation of the Daren-ddu fault, a major northwest–southeast-trending fault in the Coal Measure rocks of the South Wales Coalfield.

The Tongwynlais Fault is a normal fault and affects both the Carboniferous Limestone and underlying Devonian Upper Old Red Sandstone. The fault has a downthrow of 85m to the west.

The water is hypothesised to flow largely within the Carboniferous Limestone Group but partly within the Marros Group from sources on the north crop of the coalfield. At the lowest levels of the syncline within the Coal Measures it is heated geothermally before rising to the surface.

== Temperature ==
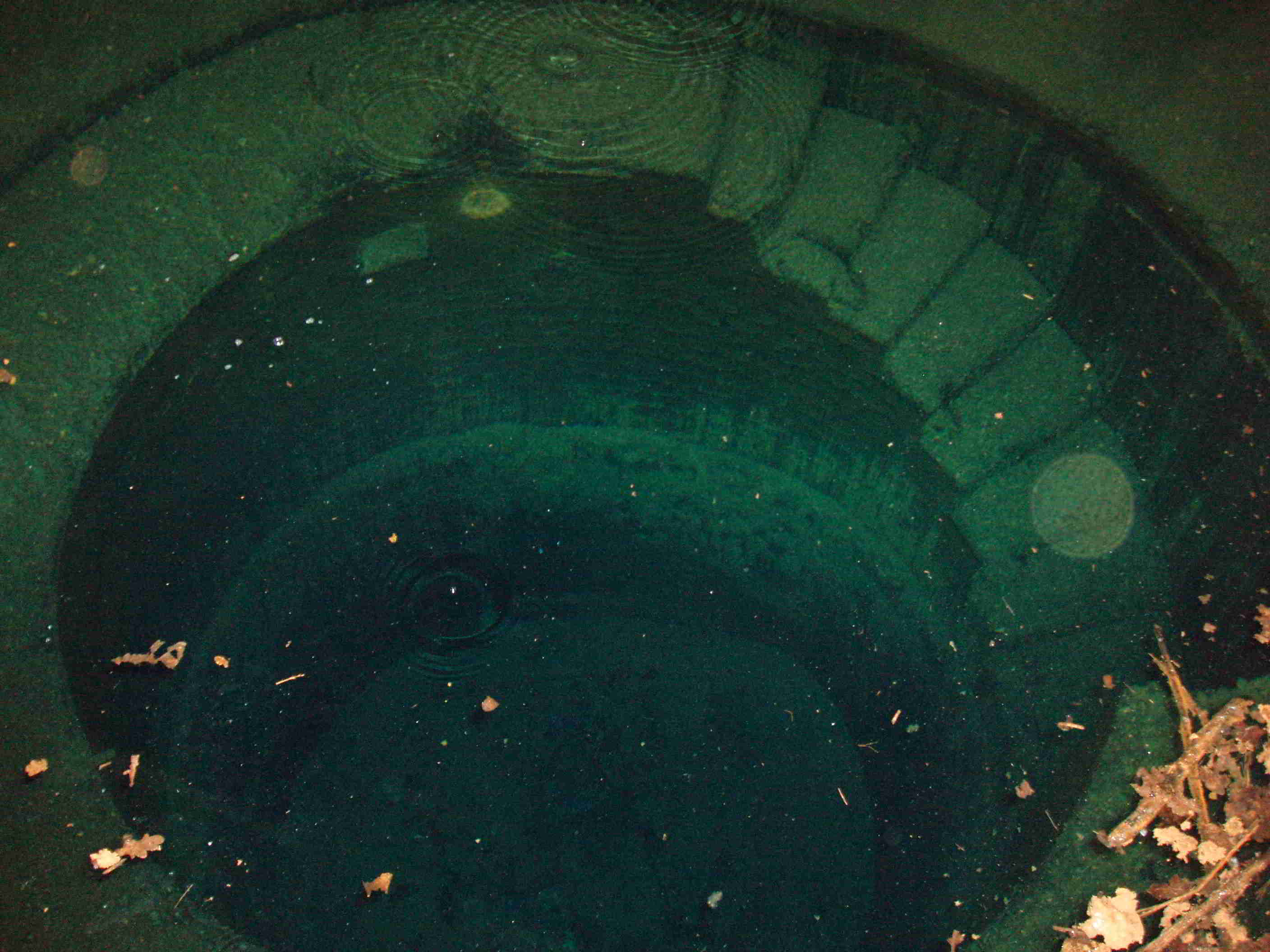
Gas: Taffs Well Thermal spring view into well

Environment Agency Wales have monitored the temperature of the well since 2008, using a Solinst LTC logger.

During this period the maximum recorded temperature was 22.12 °C (71.82 °F) and the average temperature 21.6 °C (70.9 °F). The temperature varies +/- 0.5 °C (32.9 °F) about the average temperature of 21.6 °C (70.9 °F). The temperature can, on the whole be described as constant, with lower temperatures on occasion being attributed to mixing with Taff water or groundwater after heavy rain.

The average temperature at Taff's Well Spring, 21.6 °C (70.9 °F), is over 10 °C (50 °F) warmer than the average groundwater temperature of 11.3 °C (52.3 °F) in Wales.

Temperature °C	Date	Reference
18.61	1877	
13	1969	
22	1969	
18.5	1969	
19.6	1980	
20.6	1988	
22.12	2008	

== Water flow ==
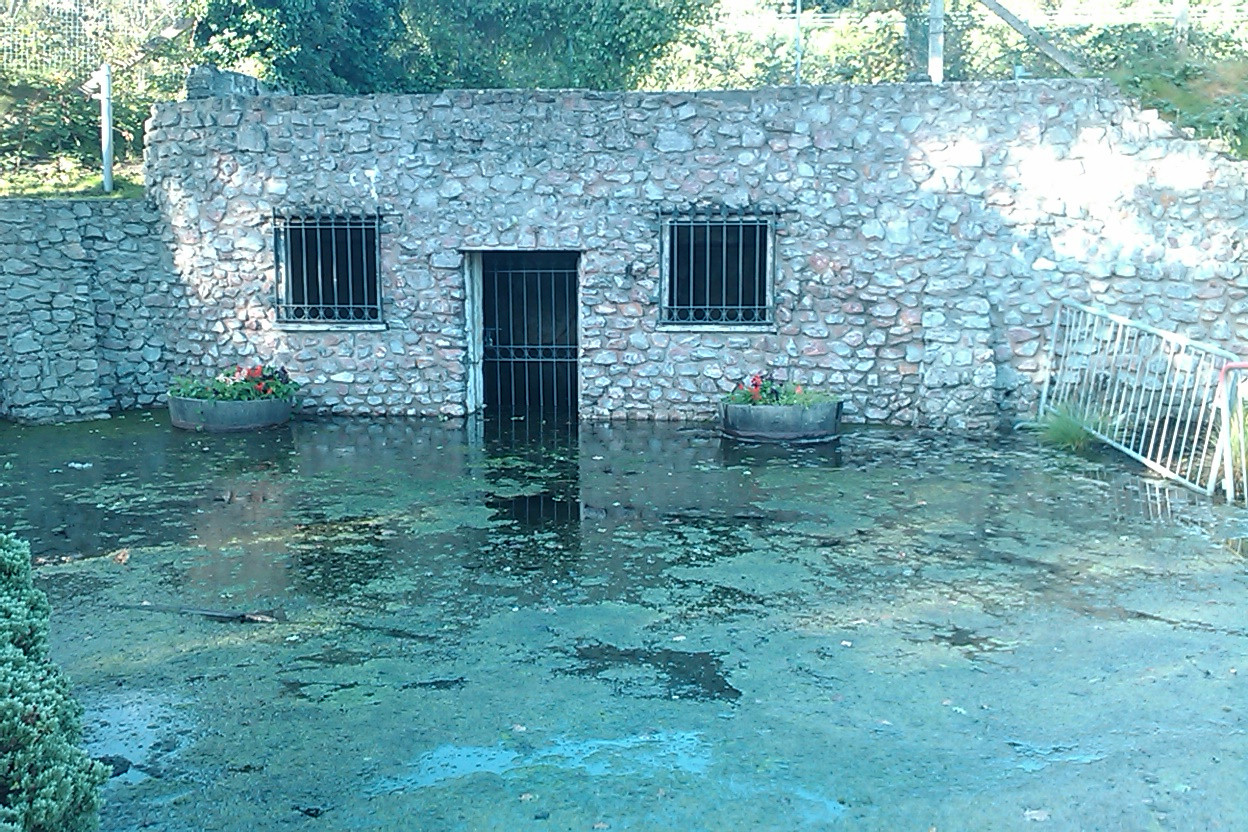
Water level: Taffs Well Thermal Spring flooded

Measurements of flow from the overflow pipe are rare. Slaters Dictionary mentions the well is close to the river into which the waters are continually flowing. In 1877 the well was described as "very powerful, and appears from rough calculation to afford about 800 gallons per hour" (or about 0.001m^{3}/s).

== Ecology ==
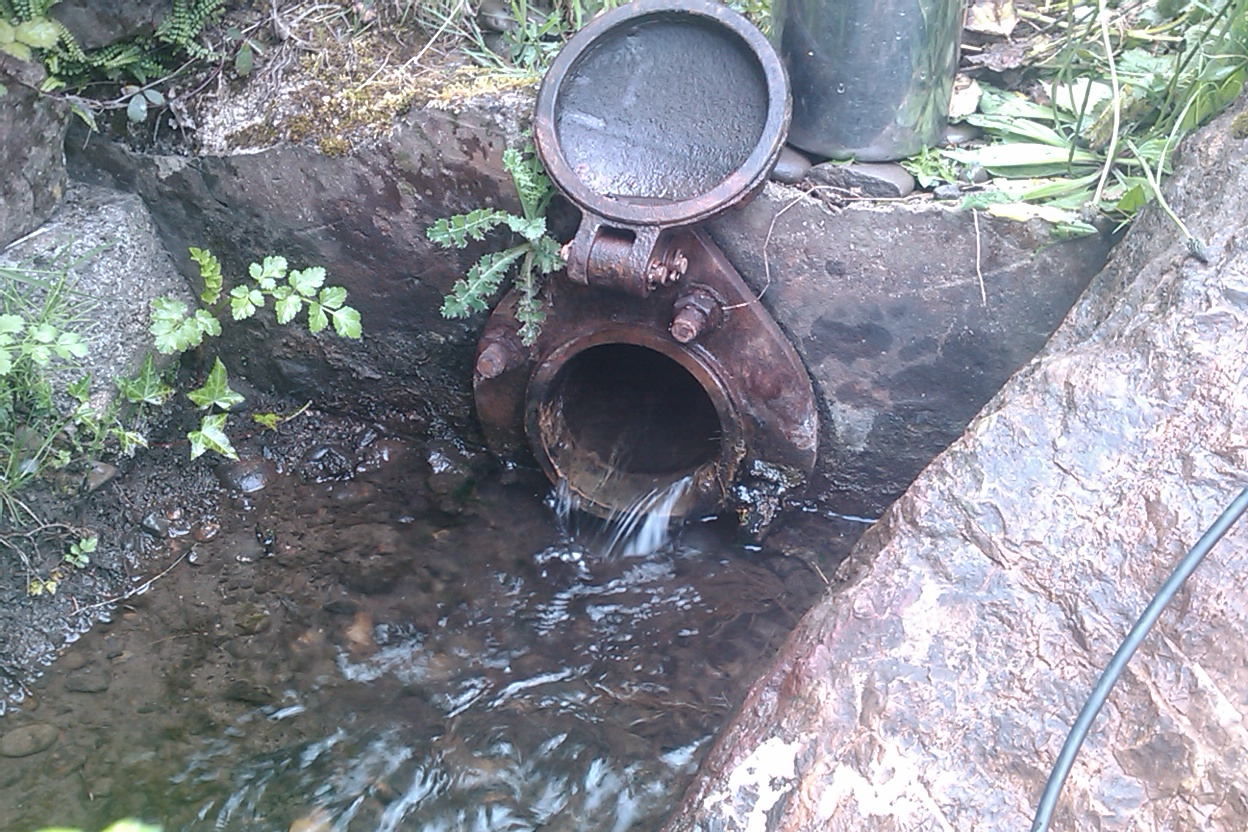
Water Flow: Taffs Well Thermal Spring overflow to River Taff

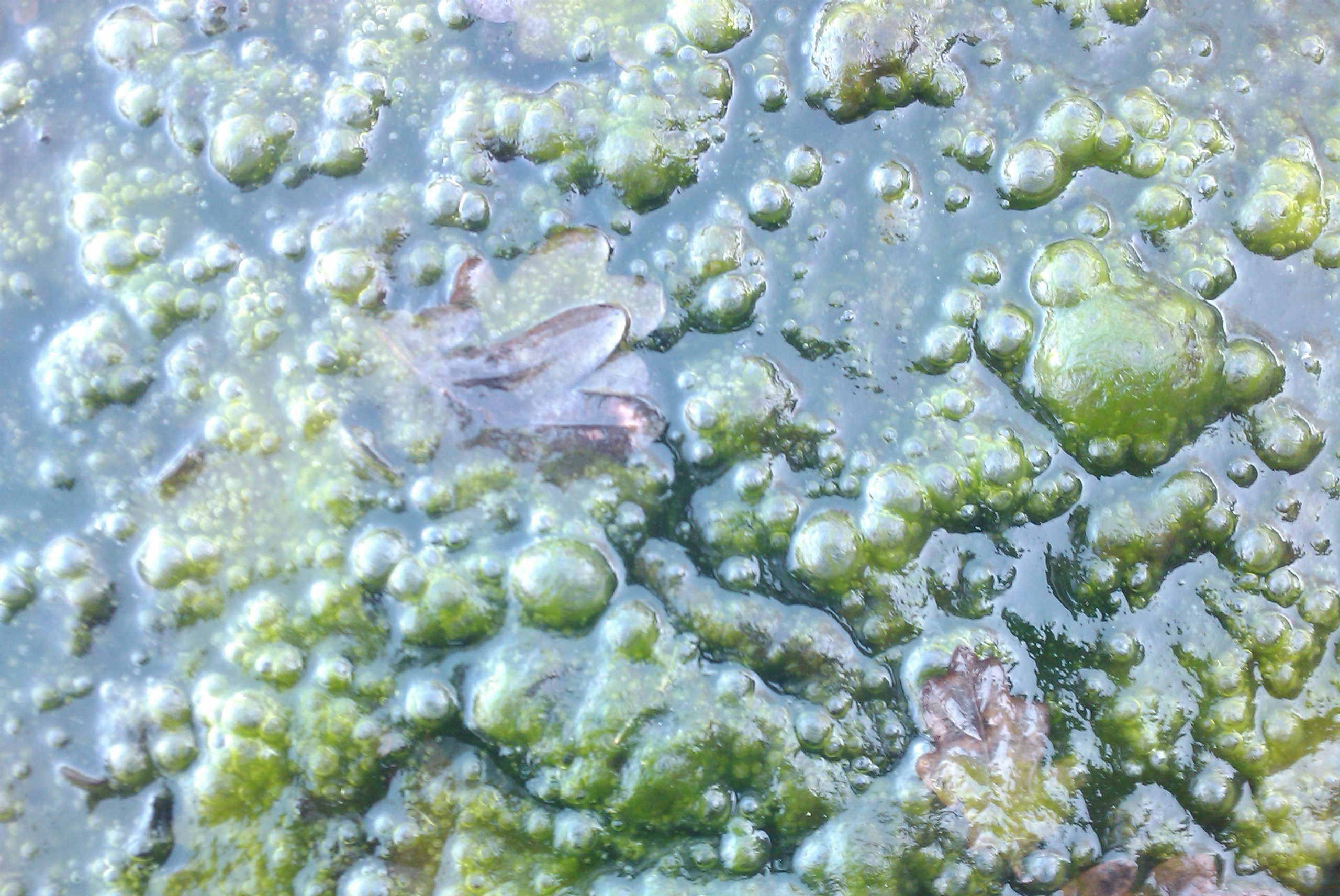
Ecology: Spirogyra aglae in Taffs Well Thermal spring flooded area

Ecological data from thermal waters is limited in the UK; however, an Irish Survey has been undertaken which looks at both flora and fauna associated with thermal and warm waters.

A survey of thermophilic cyanobacteria identified abundant growths of Phormidium ambiguum GOM which formed conophyton-like pinnacles up to 40 centimetres (16 in) high in the still water.

During periods when the well floods, water flows out onto the park forming a shallow pond next to the well building. Algae flourishes in the overflow water, which stands stationary exposed to light and oxygen, of which there is little in the thermal waters inside the well building. Filamentous algae Melosira variants and Spirogyra have both been identified and are very abundant in the flooded pool area outside the well building.

== See also ==
- List of hot springs
