= Total Carp =

- Editor: Dan Murrell
- Frequency: Monthly
- Founded: 1999
- Company: David Hall Publishing Ltd
- Country: United Kingdom
- Based in: Daventry
- Language: English
- Website: www.totalcarpmagazine.com
- ISSN: 1467-7938

Total Carp is a magazine published in the UK by David Hall Publishing Ltd, containing mostly articles of interest to carp fishermen. Angling generally is the largest participatory pastime in the UK.

== History ==
Total Carp, Is the world's biggest-selling carp fishing magazine.

DHP bought Catchmore Carp from its previous owner and publisher Tim Hodges, who stayed on board as editor for a short period. In 1999 the magazine relaunched as Total Carp. Marc Coulson became editor in 2003. Deputy editor Dan Murrell became editor in 2016.
