= Lifescape =

Defunct British glossy women monthly magazine

Lifescape was a glossy monthly magazine, published by Madafu Publishing Ltd in London.

== History and profile ==
Lifescape was set up by Rajasana Otiende in 2005. The first issue appeared on 13 September 2005. The magazine was sold in WH Smiths, Borders, Waitrose and independent newsagents. It was part of the 'Just Ask!' campaign and so readers could request their local newsagent to stock the magazine.

The magazine covered fair trade fashion, cruelty-free and vegan beauty products, social issues, health, nutrition, home, travel and more. It was also the only vegetarian magazine on sale at British newsstands.

Each year Lifescape commended companies that were making a difference by producing cruelty-free cosmetics in its Beauty Awards. It also run Food Awards for vegetarian or vegan, fair trade and organic foods which were providing excellent options for people who eat with a conscience.
