= First Empire: The International Magazine for the Napoleonic Enthusiast, Historian, and Gamer =

- Editor: Dave Watkins
- Categories: History
- Frequency: Bi-monthly (6 per year)
- Publisher: First Empire Ltd.
- Founded: 1991
- Final issue: 2011
- Country: UK
- Based in: Bridgnorth
- Language: English
- Website: web.archive.org/web/20040505065649/http://www.firstempire.net/
- ISSN: 0969-0689

First Empire: The International Magazine for the Napoleonic Enthusiast, Historian, and Gamer was a bimonthly Napoleonic history magazine published in Bridgnorth, the United Kingdom. The magazine was in circulation between 1991 and 2011 and produced a total of 117 issue during its existence.

== Notable authors ==
Professor Christopher Blackburn of the University of Louisiana at Monroe wrote an article on "Napoleon & Poland" for the magazine. The author explained, "First Empire remains popular and maintains a large international readership because its subscribers, whether professional historians or enthusiastic re-enactors, hold the common bond of being interested in the history of the Napoleonic Era ... It’s a great place to publish because too often academic historians are writing only for other historians and not for the community that just love to explore our past."

== Table of issues ==
Issue(s)	Date(s)	Cover story
16	April/May 1994	"This Issue: Tolentino 1815, Vimeiro 1808, Neapolitan Army Uniforms, Napoleonic Infantry Tactics and more..."
104	January/February 2009	"This Month: Respectable Spies Prince Jerome and more..."
105	March/April 2009	"This Issue: Günzberg, Invading France, Re-enactment, Relics and much more"
106	May/June 2009	"This issue... Denis Davidov Napoleon's Desk Mask Wellington's Worst Scrape ...And more!"
107	July/August 2009	"This issue... Paul I and The collapse of France Regiment d'Isembourg Sabugal"
108	September/October 2009	"This issue... 45éme Eagle Sir Charles Brisbane Legion d'honneur And More..."

== Reception ==
Max Sewell, a Fellow of the International Napoleonic Society praises the magazine as "the result of the hard work and devotion of a number of individuals who donate their time and effort to writing and reporting on their interests, travels, and studies. They do not appear to be paid for their efforts, but we are all rewarded by their fine work." By contrast, a more critical reviewer rates "First Empire a 'try before you buy.' What strikes me as a lack of focus may strike you as wonderful breadth and variety. Nuggets that feel to me unconnected and wandering may appeal to you. But at about $55 per year (6 issues) it is not a subscription to be picked up on a whim."

== Demise ==
Following the printer of this journal ceasing to trade, the magazine itself has stopped production; issue 116 was the last to be printed, in January 2011, and issue 117 was the last to be produced in digital form.

== Death of the founder ==
Dave Watkins, founder and editor of First Empire and fellow of the International Napoleonic Society, died on 3 June 2015 after suffering from pancreatic cancer.
