= Gift Focus =

- Type: business magazine
- Format: Paper and online magazine
- Owner(s): KD Media Publishing Ltd
- Editor: Rachel Westall
- Founded: 1998; 27 years ago
- Language: English
- Headquarters: Witham, Essex, England
- Circulation: 7,217
- Website: Gift Focus magazine

Gift Focus magazine is a trade publication and web site owned by KD Media Publishing Ltd. It is a business-to-business (B2B) magazine brand predominantly aimed at UK giftware retailers including independent retailers, high street multiples, department stores, garden centres, heritage outlets and other gift stockists. It is the official journal of the Giftware Association. Its editorial offices are in Witham, Essex UK and its editor is Rachel Westall.

Established in 1998, Gift Focus magazine is published bi-monthly.
