= Marmalade (magazine) =

British magazine

Marmalade was a British quarterly publication covering the creative industries, media, style, fashion and contemporary culture. It was in circulation between 2001 and 2009.

== History and profile ==
Marmalade was founded in 2001 by journalist Kirsty Robinson and art director Sacha (Spencer Trace) Teulon The Guardian welcomed its arrival "“A cerebral yet emotive blend of intelligent and innovative artwork”" whilst Henrietta Thompson praised it in Blueprint Magazine “In the end, there are only two things I could hate about Marmalade. Firstly, everyone keeps trying to steal min. Secondly, I wish I’d done it first.” Marmalade was published on a quarterly basis.

The magazine went on maternity leave in 2009. Teulon has since moved into directing drama with "Fingers Crossed" Robinson has since published the novel Grass Stains published by Random House.

Its contributors ranged from established artists, photographers and writers to new and unknown talent, many of whom were still studying.

In May 2006, Teulon received a D&AD award for the Art Direction of the magazine.

On 18 December 2006, it was reported that Marmalade and MySpace.com were working together to create the first magazine made entirely from MySpace user-generated content. Jamie Kantrowitz, Senior Vice-President of Marketing and Content, MySpace Europe, was quoted in The Guardian as saying, "MySpace is the ultimate democratic medium where anyone with talent can showcase their work. Through our partnership with Marmalade, we hope to translate this DIY quality into print and hand the reins over to undiscovered creatives with fresh ideas."

== Well-known contributors ==
- Wolfgang Tillmans (Turner Prize-winning photographer)
- Irvine Welsh (novelist and author of Trainspotting)
- Grayson Perry (Turner Prize-winning artist)
- Kevin Braddock (journalist and author)
- Zoe Williams (journalist)
- Alex Zamora (journalist and zinester)
- Francesca Gavin (journalist and author)
- Miss AMP (journalist and zinester)
- JT LeRoy (author)
- Gareth Pugh (fashion designer)
- Henry Holland (writer and fashion designer)
- Matt Irwin (photographer)
