= Family Circle (UK magazine) =

Defunct British women monthly magazine

Family Circle was a monthly British women's magazine.

The publication was founded in 1964 by International Thomson Publishing and soon became the country's top-selling title, achieving one million sales per issue. This was principally through pioneering a policy of selling copies only through supermarkets. It was joined by a sister title, Living, and numerous spin-off books were published. By 1984, it was still selling 580,000 copies per issue.

In 1986, Prima was launched in the UK and its sales soon overtook those of Family Circle, which also suffered from increased competition from other magazines in supermarkets. In 1988, it was acquired by IPC Media, but sales continued to slump. By 2006, it was selling around 113,000 copies per issue and was closed down.
