= Flintshire Historical Society journal =

The Flintshire Historical Society Journal is an annual magazine in English, containing transcripts and articles relating to the county, with book reviews and society notes. It is published by the Flintshire Historical Society, a registered charity founded in 1911 to collect and publish archaeological and historical material about Flintshire. From 1911 to 1976, the magazine was published as the Flintshire Historical Society Publications. In 1978 it obtained its current name.

The magazine has been digitized by the Welsh Journals Online project at the National Library of Wales.
