= Corsetry and Underwear =

British industry trade magazine

The Corsetry and Underwear Journal was a British corsetry and underwear industry trade magazine of which Emily Yooll was the editor from 1935 to 1975 and Edith Base was a formerly editor in 1950.
