= The Revival (magazine) =

Issue 20

The Revival is a free quarterly British magazine aimed at young Muslims, covering issues faced by Muslim youth.

It was co-founded by current editor Sajid Iqbal in the spring of 1996 as a four-page black and white newsletter to be distributed in Oldham. out of frustration with the lack of Islamic literature.

The newsletter expanded rapidly through voluntary distribution, initially to Manchester, then the North West, and finally the whole UK.

From 2003 until 2005 The Revival appeared solely in an online format. In May 2005, The Revival was relaunched as a national magazine.

The magazine had a circulation of approximately 15,000 in 2006.

== Media coverage ==
In the aftermath of the July 7 bombings in London Revival assistant editor Irfan Khan was interviewed by the Observer.

In August 2005, when UK Home Office minister Hazel Blears visited Oldham, there was publicity surrounding Zahid Maqbool, spokesperson and assistant editor of The Revival, from spots on outlets such as BBC Radio 4 to pieces on major news outlets such as The Guardian, BBC News, and The Telegraph.
