= Bwletin Cymdeithas Emynau Cymru =

Bwletin Cymdeithas Emynau Cymru (English: Bulletin of the Welsh Hymn Society) is a Welsh language magazine that includes critical studies of hymns and hymn-writers. Cymdeithas Emynau Cymru ("The Welsh Hymn Society") was founded in 1967 to promote the study and use of Welsh hymns and hymn tunes. The Bulletin's founding editor was Gomer M. Roberts. He was succeeded in 1978 by E. Wyn James.

The magazine has been digitised by the Welsh Journals Online project at the National Library of Wales.
