= Transgressions: A Journal of Urban Exploration =

Transgressions: A Journal of Urban Exploration was a British magazine founded in 1995. Although only four editions were produced during its lifetime, one of these was a double-issue (nos 2/3). Its contents reflected the emergence of new forms of psychogeographical activity in the 1990s. A more playful and sensuous direction was charted, nodding more to the situationism of Asger Jorn than Guy Debord, with frequent allusions to the "magico-Marxism" current amongst British groups, such as the reformed London Psychogeographical Association. The first usage of the term "magico-Marxism" appears to have been in this magazine, in 1996.

The magazine also introduced the work of the Italian "situationauts" as well as various psychogeographical initiatives, some of which have a post-avant-garde insistence on "ordinary lives". The magazine was edited by Alastair Bonnett and published by Salamander Press, London. It ended publication in 2001.
