= Welsh Book Studies =

Magazine

Welsh Book Studies / Llyfr yng Nghymru publishes academic and critical articles about past and current publishing in Wales. The magazine was first published in 1998. It contains English and Welsh material (Welsh articles include English abstracts). It is published by Canolfan y Llyfr Aberystwyth Centre for the Book, a joint venture between the National Library of Wales, the University of Wales, Aberystwyth and the Welsh Books Council, formed in 1997.

The magazine has been digitized by the Welsh Journals Online project at the National Library of Wales.
