= Mad About Boys =

British magazine

Mad About Boys was a monthly magazine in the United Kingdom aimed at girls aged between nine and twelve. First launched in January 2001 by Planet Three Publishing, it attracted controversy over what many saw as adult content, and was banned from many chain stores, including Woolworths and WHSmith. It ceased publication after four issues due to poor sales.

The editor of the magazine, Maria Landolfi, told PR Week: "Our USP is that we feature 12 teen boys aged 13 to 17 and get our readers to vote for the 'boy of the month' by post or on our website".

== See also ==
- Moral panic
