= Groundtastic =

British sports magazine

- Co-editors: Paul Claydon & Vince Taylor
- Frequency: Quarterly
- Format: A5
- First issue: March 1995
- Country: United Kingdom
- Based in: Rochford
- Language: English
- Website: www.groundtastic.co.uk
- ISSN: 1363-2124

Groundtastic is a quarterly magazine published in the United Kingdom about football grounds.

== History ==
The magazine was first published in March 1995 by Paul Claydon, Vince Taylor and Jon Weaver. Although largely focussed on football grounds in the United Kingdom, it also features stadiums from around the world. Its articles cover the construction and renovation of grounds, as well as detailing football ground histories. The magazine has an annual award for best new non-League ground of the year.

The magazine was featured as a guest publication on Have I Got News for You, and has been described by poet and playwright Ian McMillan as "the greatest magazine in the world."
