= Your Family Tree =

British genealogy and family history magazine (2003-18)

Your Family History
- Editor: Nell Darby
- Categories: Genealogy
- Frequency: 13 per year
- First issue: 2003
- Final issue: 2018
- Company: Dennis Publishing
- Country: United Kingdom
- Based in: London
- Website: www.yourfamilytreemag.co.uk
- ISSN: 1740-0856

Your Family History (published as Your Family Tree between 2003 and 2016) was a British magazine devoted to genealogy and family history subjects published between 2003 and 2018.

The magazine was designed to offer practical advice written by experts on all areas of family history research from how to make the most out of the ever-expanding family history records available online as well as traditional means of research.

The magazine had a mix of broad articles on using the key family history records such as censuses, birth, marriage and death certificates, parish registers; practical features aimed at beginners, experienced researchers and experts alike; social and military history pieces; regional research guides; news, reviews, surname histories and much more.

Each issue came with free resources such as directories, parish indexes and software.

In 2011 the magazine became available digitally on iTunes newsstand. It was also available on Zinio, Nook and Kindle Fire.

Historian Nell Darby was the editor between 2015–18, with Andrew Chapman as executive editor.

There were 13 issues per year. It was published in London, England, by Dennis Publishing.

It was announced in February 2018 that the March 2018 issue, No 192, would be the last.
