= Mookychick =

- Editor: Magda Knight
- Categories: Feminism
- Publisher: Mookychick
- Founded: 2005
- Country: United Kingdom
- Based in: London
- Language: English
- Website: https://www.mookychick.co.uk

Mookychick is an alternative feminist website and community. Content includes analysis of social and cultural trends, issues relating to gender, orientation and mental health, and content related to alternative fashion, movies, books, poetry, music and arts and crafts from a feminist perspective.

== History ==
Mookychick first went online in 2005. Founding editor Magda Knight wanted to create a public space to support those whose life choices or social background rendered them non-normative in the eyes of contemporary society.

== Content genres ==
On their submissions page, Mookychick states the editorial team are looking for "personal essays, poetry, fiction, artwork, interviews, how-to guides, reviews, thought pieces and listicles", with specific themed submissions every month. It also cites a preference for queer, personal and eclectic content.

Mookychick has published interviews with the likes of She Makes War, Amanda Palmer and Joanne Harris, among others.

== Other projects ==
=== Annual feminist fiction competition ===
In October 2011, Mookychick instigated an annual award for feminist writing, FemFlash Fiction. Judges included Lena Chen and Julie Zeilinger. This annual competition ran from 2011 until 2013.

=== Annual May Day Magic ritual ===
In April 2017, Mookychick instigated an annual worldwide May Day Magic Ritual held every May 1. The ritual is loosely tied to the Pagan period of Beltane, but essentially non-denominational. Participants in the ritual fashion each other a May Day Crown from wherever they are located in the world, and some share their resulting creative works on social media.
