= SA Promo =

SA PROMO Magazine for South Africans Abroad

SA Promo is a magazine published monthly in the United Kingdom since 2006. It is printed in A5-size format and is targeted at the community of approximately 1,500,000 expatriate South Africans living in the United Kingdom.

== History ==
SA Promo was founded in November 2006 by J. C. Muller.

Its founders saw an opportunity after South Africa rejoined the Commonwealth post-apartheid. This allowed South Africans to apply for a working holiday visa to live and work in the United Kingdom for a period of two years. The United Kingdom saw an influx from South Africa, many of whom have subsequently settled in the country. On 27 November 2008 the UK working holiday visa was replaced by a Point Based Visa System. The South African government does not have a reciprocal agreement with the British government, and therefore no longer qualifies for this category of visa.

In 2014 the SA Promo changed focus to cater for all South Africans and not just South Africans abroad.

== Circulation & distribution ==
=== Internationally ===
With South Africans relocating all over the world the demand for media aimed at South Africans abroad has increased. SA Promo magazine is now available as an online magazine accessible from anywhere in the world.

=== Online ===
SA Promo magazine is available to read online, providing access to the magazine from anywhere in the world. The website also offers a comprehensive directory of South African businesses and organisations abroad.
