= Attire Accessories =

- Cover of Attire Accessories magazine
- Type: Business magazine
- Format: Paper and online magazine
- Owner: KD Media Publishing Ltd
- Editor: Laura Sutherland
- Founded: 2007; 18 years ago
- Language: English
- Headquarters: Witham, Essex, England
- Circulation: 7,300
- Website: www.attireaccessories.com

Attire Accessories is a trade publication and web site owned by KD Media Publishing Ltd. It is a business-to-business (B2B) magazine brand predominantly aimed at UK fashion retailers including independent fashion shops, jewellers, boutiques, shoe shops, bag shops, accessory shops and buyers in national fashion chains and department stores. Its editorial offices are in Witham, Essex UK and its editor is Laura Sutherland.

Attire Accessories provides industry professionals with detailed information on trade shows and reviews hundreds of new products. The magazine also offers advice on financial and legal matters, and providing trend forecasts.

Established in 2007, Attire Accessories magazine is published bi-monthly.

The online version of the magazine includes the current issue and previous issues, as well as features, polls, competitions, and updates on events.
