= Eurofruit =

Eurofruit Magazine, September 2005

Eurofruit (full title Eurofruit Magazine) is a monthly global trade marketing magazine for the European fresh fruit and vegetable sector.

== History and profile ==
Eurofruit was founded in 1992. The publication is aimed at buyers, exporters, importers, distributors and producers of fresh produce, be it sold in Europe or exported from it. The magazine is published from London. It also has two sister titles, Asiafruit Magazine (based in Melbourne) and Americafruit Magazine (London), which are aimed at the Asian import-export market and the North American import market respectively. The publisher of these magazines is Market Intelligence Ltd.
