= UPraw =

UPraw Magazine was a national UK student magazine distributed through various university-related sites, student unions and selected Blackwell bookstores from 2001 - 2002. The magazine was based in Bournemouth.

The magazine was a full colour glossy publication and four issues were released. The cover and interviews stars included the BBC Radio 1 Disc Jockeys 'Dream Team', the RnB act 'Artful Dodger' and acting legend Robert De Niro.

The magazine was a mix of student related current affairs and mostly humour based articles. The magazine proved very popular in smaller cities but was less successful in bigger cities where local student publications were more dominant. The magazine was also criticised in some quarters for not having enough of a political agenda and not advancing student issues.

The magazine was established by Suzanne Miller who had previously edited the magazine FastTimes.

The magazine was co-edited by Nimalan Nades (also known by his real name Nimalan Nadesalingam) who had previously edited a local student magazine in Lincoln, England and who had also been a published as a writer for FastTime. Many of the UPraw writers were also Lincoln based and included James Copper who had co-edited a local student magazine with Nimalan Nades previously. Another contributor was Jon Kirk who then went on to establish Chalk, a rock-climbing magazine.
