= British Wildlife =

British natural history magazine

- Editor: Guy Freeman
- Categories: Wildlife
- Frequency: Bimonthly
- Publisher: NHBS Ltd
- Founder: Andrew Branson
- Founded: 1989
- First issue: October 1989
- Company: NHBS Ltd
- Country: United Kingdom
- Website: www.britishwildlife.com
- ISSN: 0958-0956

British Wildlife is a bi-monthly subscription-only natural history magazine published by NHBS Ltd in Totnes, Devon, England.

== Overview ==
British Wildlife was first published in October 1989 and was based in Basingstoke. The founder is Andrew Branson. The magazine is subtitled "the magazine for the modern naturalist". Individual issues are B5 in size. The first three volumes had colour covers, but from volume 4 onwards the design changed to a white background with dark blue text for the title, and a photograph or painting on the front cover. Regular features include the "wildlife reports", which cover recent records and findings by taxonomic group, and "conservation news", which is compiled by Sue Everett.

== Acquisition ==
In 2013, British Wildlife Publishing, the publisher of the magazine, was acquired by Osprey Publishing. In that year, the magazine had nine thousand subscribers. In 2014, Osprey was acquired by Bloomsbury Publishing.

Since 2016, British Wildlife magazine has been published by NHBS Ltd.
