= What Investment =

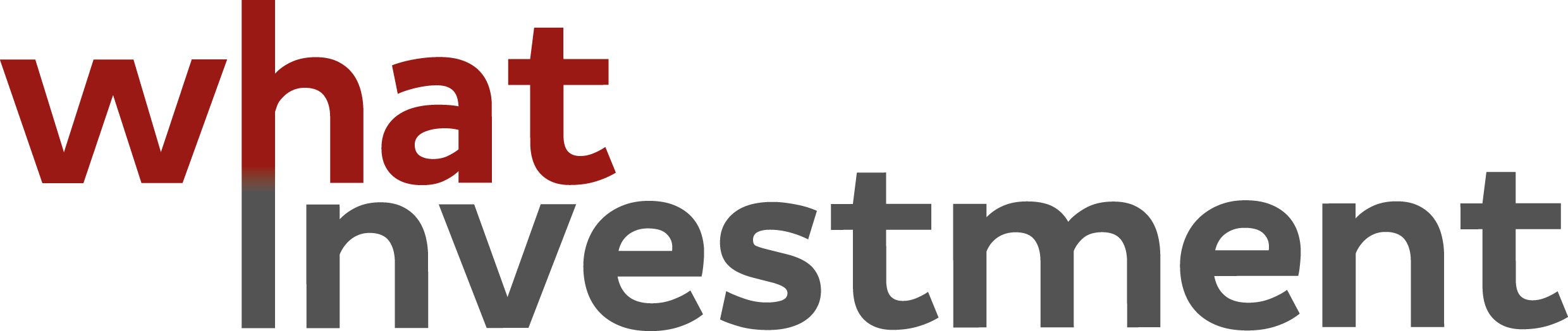
- Editor: Lawrence Gosling
- Categories: Personal finance
- Frequency: Monthly
- Total circulation (June 2016): 7,240
- Founded: 1982
- Country: United Kingdom
- Based in: London
- Language: English
- Website: www.whatinvestment.co.uk
- ISSN: 0263-953X
- OCLC: 54507305

What Investment was a British magazine last published monthly by Bonhill Group plc. The magazine was established in 1982. The publication is distributed through branches of W H Smith as well as directly to subscribers. The magazine also has an online presence in the form of a website which provides news for retail investors on funds, stocks, shares, and markets.

The online magazine has two weekly newsletters: What Investment Trader - which is sent to digital readers on a Monday focussing on direct equity investment, large cap stocks, and day trading (shares, spread betting, CFDs, Forex margin trading, and covered warrants). The traditional What Investment Newsletter concentrates on unit trusts, investment trusts, and exchange traded products. What investment was created by Gregory Thain, who was also the original publisher. It was an essential source of investment news to the small/medium size investor prior to internet. The magazine launched the extremely successful "joe blogs" column that was often the top performing share tipster in the'80.

== Previous editors ==
The following persons have been editor of What Investment:

- 2021-2022 Rory Palmer
- 2018-2022 Lawrence Gosling
- 2017-2018 Ingrid Smith
- 2017 (acting) Ben Rossi
- 2015-2017 David Thorpe
- 2011-2015 Nicholas Britton
- 2009-2011 Joe McGrath
- 2009 (acting) Jennifer Lowe
- 1990-2009 Keiron Root
- 1982-1989 Christopher Gilchrist
