= Pentacle (magazine) =

Neopagan quarterly magazine

'Pentacle'
- Editor: Marion Pearce
- Categories: Pagan
- Frequency: Quarterly
- Total circulation: 2,500
- First issue: February 2002
- Country: United Kingdom
- Language: English
- Website: pentaclemagazine.co.uk
- ISSN: 1753-898X

Pentacle is a Neopagan magazine that began publication in February 2002. It was created by Marion Pearce and Jon Randall. It is a quarterly magazine published on the dates of the old festivals of Imbolc, Beltaine, Lammas and Samhain, and has a worldwide distribution of 2,500. It was conceived to provide an independent voice for today's Pagan, those not wanting to be told what to believe by the two main organisation-backed pagan magazines of the time.

Pentacle has published articles on folklore, ritual, magic, archaeology. Articles have covered many aspects of pagan traditions, including heathen, Druidry, and other classical and modern traditions. The magazine has also included announcements of workshops, conferences, moots, festivals, activities, training, groups and exchange magazines. Most of the articles have been once again aimed at the beginner/intermediate level reader, often written by the Pagan community and readership, whose members cover many levels of expertise. Furthermore, it has contained a large amount of pagan and visionary art throughout, supporting all levels and abilities.

== History ==
Marion Pearce, the first editor (now the publisher) has included art, animal welfare and poetry. She has also included many articles on archaeology and historical folk practices. She stood down as editor in 2006 to allow the magazine to grow internationally.

The subsequent editor, Jon Randall, further expanded the remit of the magazine to include herbalism, counseling and science-backed therapies. This was achieved through a more rigorous academic methodology, contrasted by a more hands-on approach to Paganism as a religion and life choice. His style was more hard-hitting than the previous editor, and he tended to "call it as he saw it", leading to the inclusion of more in-depth articles that challenged and stretched the readership.

As of January 2010, Jon Randall resigned from his position as designer and editor.

In the meantime, Marion Pearce took over the reins again as editor. There has been a new forum and Facebook page, where readers can contribute ideas for the kind of content they would like to see included. The relaunched magazine has been described there in the following manner:

Back will be the informative articles, with wide ranging pagan and archaeological news, poetry, and classified sections, all illustrated in full colour by high class art work. Back too will be a regular environmental feature. There will also be a new regular feature on sacred sites throughout the UK. All you need to know about the pagan community in the UK - in one magazine.

Pentacle has supported the PaganDash initiative to have Paganism counted in the UK Census 2011.
