= Country Homes & Interiors =

British magazine

- Cover of the December 2024 issue
- Categories: Design
- Frequency: Monthly
- Circulation: 95,823 (ABC Jul - Dec 2013); Print and digital editions.
- First issue: April 1986
- Company: Future plc
- Country: United Kingdom
- Based in: London
- Language: English
- Website: Official website

Country Homes & Interiors is published by Future plc and is the only magazine in the UK dedicated to modern country style.

== History and profile ==
The magazine launched in April 1986 in London, England. Each issue features country houses from around the UK plus accompanying photographs and owner profiles; country style decorating; interior design ideas; gardens and planting advice; and seasonal food and entertaining. Other articles include 'Earning a living' which profiles small country-based businesses and 'My favourite view' page with photographs of nominated landscapes from around the UK.
