= Practical Boat Owner =

British magazine about boats

- Cover of the November 2024 issue
- Editor: Katy Stickland
- Categories: Boats
- Frequency: Monthly
- Circulation: 29,078 (ABC Jan - Dec 2013); Print and digital editions.
- Publisher: Future plc
- Founded: 1967
- Country: United Kingdom
- Language: English
- Website: www.pbo.co.uk
- ISSN: 0032-6348

Practical Boat Owner is a British magazine about boats. It is published by Future plc. It covers boat maintenance and repairs, sailing activities and news about sailing and motor boats.

== History ==
Practical Boat Owner was started in 1967. The founding editor was Denny Desoutter. In 2002, it was announced that Sarah Norbury would become editor. She was later replaced by David Pugh.

From 2018, the magazine was edited by Robert Melotti, and then Alison Wood. The current editor is Katy Stickland, who prior to the appointment in January 2023 was the deputy editor of Yachting Monthly magazine.

== Publications ==
The magazine also produced a small crafts almanac as well as a glossary of nautical terms, both published by Bloomsbury.
