= Tortured Souls (magazine) =

Magazine

Tortured Souls was a magazine published by Beast Enterprises Limited in Oxford, UK and then in Birmingham.

== Contents ==
Tortured Souls was a British magazine consisting of adventures for roleplaying games.

== Publication history ==
The first issue appeared in October–November 1983. The 12th issue was its last, which was published in 1988.

== Reception ==
Doug Cowie reviewed Tortured Souls for Imagine magazine, and stated that "Tortured Souls represents amazing value. The quantity of material for the money makes it a recommended purchase. The quality of that material makes it an essential purchase."

Aaron Allston reviewed Tortured Souls in The Space Gamer No. 73. Allston commented that "If you are a fantasy GM, I'd wholeheartedly recommend Tortured Souls to you. It's pretty good."

== Reviews ==
- Imagine #15
