= The Artist (UK magazine) =

British arts magazine

- Categories: Art
- Frequency: Monthly
- Founded: 1931
- Company: Warners Group Publications
- Country: United Kingdom
- Based in: Tenterden
- Language: English
- Website: https://www.painters-online.co.uk
- ISSN: 0004-3877

The Artist is Britain's longest-established practical art magazine, first published in 1931. It is published monthly by Warners Group Publications from their offices in Bourne, Lincolnshire, and costs £5.25 per issue. It is available to buy from newsagents. Dr Sally Bulgin was the editor of the magazine from 1986 to 2024. Jane Stroud who has worked on the magazine for over 20 years has taken over.

The magazine's website, PaintersOnline, was launched in September 2007. PaintersOnline is an online community, including a forum for sharing experiences and advice; blogs; a gallery to upload images of visitors’ drawings and paintings; and a searchable database of art clubs and art tutors.
