= Craft&design =

British magazine

- craft&design issue 218, Nov/Dec 2011
- Categories: Crafts
- Frequency: Bimonthly
- Founded: 2007
- Final issue: March–April 2017 (print)
- Country: United Kingdom
- Website: www.craftanddesign.net
- ISSN: 0953-9190

craft&design was a magazine based around crafts in the UK. The magazine was originally published as Craftsman Magazine from its launch in 1983 up until July 2007. Following the March–April 2017 issue, its print edition folded and became an only-online magazine. In December 2018, the online magazine and the "craft&design" website closed due to the retirement of their owners.

Craftsman Magazine was a publication for professional craftspeople and hobbyists wanting to sell their work, with a focus primarily on selling through Craft Fairs and Trade Fairs in Britain. The magazine developed alongside the UK craft industry and became an important resource for people wanting to earn a living from their work. The publishers, Angie and Paul Boyer, Directors of PSB Design, and Print Consultants Limited, first realized there was a need for such a publication when they were selling their own work at UK Craft Fairs in the early 1980s; there was nothing available at that time to inform people about the craft fairs, who organized them, where and when they were taking place or how to book stands at events.

As the UK Craft industry expanded and developed over the years, the publishers realised that the profile of the magazine needed to change as well, so in the summer of 2007 they relaunched the publication as Craftsman craft&design Magazine with a new format, new design and a more contemporary approach to the content. The aims remain the same, to help craftspeople in Britain to earn a living from their work.

== Development and History ==
Craftsman Magazine Issue 1

Craftsman Magazine Issue 182

The first issue of Craftsman Magazine was published Winter 1983 by Paul and Angie Boyer, Directors of PSB Design and Print Consultants Limited, a small graphic design business based in Commercial Street, London E1. The first issue was 16 pages and printed in 2 colours onto newsprint. 30,000 copies were circulated free of charge at craft fairs all over Britain. The editorial in the first issue featured Bookbinding, Batik, Jewelry, Leather Carving, and Craft Fairs. The aim of the magazine was to put craft people in touch with each other, to inform craft makers and buyers about where and when craft fairs were being held, and to provide information about who organized craft fairs in Britain and how to book a stand at the fairs. Advertising was mainly from craft fair organisers.

Husband and wife team, Paul and Angie Boyer, continued to publish Craftsman Magazine 4 times a year from their London address until 1985 when, with issue number 5, they moved to Littlehampton in Sussex. By that time an annual subscription had been made available, editorial content had been expanded to include Business Advice for craft people and advertising had grown to reflect the growth in the number of craft fairs being held all over Britain. Events being advertised were at venues such as Stately Homes, Town and Village Halls, Wildlife Parks, Schools and Colleges, Hotels, Racecourses, Concert Halls, Community Centres, National Trust Properties, Leisure Centres, Sports Halls, Exhibition Centres, Shopping Centres, Airports and even US military Bases in the UK. Specialist Miniatures shows were also being advertised.

In 2002 and 2003, informative Directories were included within the pages of Craftsman Magazine; subjects included Craft Fair Organisers, Craft Supplies, Courses and Workshops, Craft Galleries, Guilds & Associations.

Issue 191 June 2007, with a cover price of £2.50 and 52 pages was the last to be published as Craftsman Magazine. With a new title and a new format, it was relaunched by Angie and Paul Boyer, Directors of PSB Design and Print Consultants Limited, as Craftsman craft&design Magazine. The first issue under the new title and format was July/August 2007, Issue 192. (The issue numbering continued from one format to the next).

=== As craft&design ===
In 2007, Angie and Paul Boyer, Directors of PSB Design and Print Consultants Limited, relaunched the title as craft&design. Although the magazine was given a new format, a redesign, and a change of title, the aim of the publication remained the same: to help craftspeople in Britain earn a living from their work.

The substantial changes that were made to the design and content of the magazine reflected the contemporary path that British crafts had taken in the early years of the 21st century. Previously focusing on providing information for craft people wanting to sell their work primarily at UK craft and trade fairs, the relaunched magazine now also encompasses craft galleries and exhibitions, commissioned work, and residencies for artists and makers, as well as information about UK craft and trade fairs. The main editorial and features are about artists, designers, and makers of contemporary craftwork; with information provided through interviews with makers and business tips and advice coming from people who work within the British craft industry.

Published bi-monthly, 6 times a year, craft&design is a privately owned UK magazine which covers all aspects of British crafts and the various craft disciplines. The magazine became an online magazine following the publication of the last print issue, March–April 2017.

== Shows and Events ==
=== CraftAid ===
In 1986, Craftsman Magazine organised CraftAid, a national craft auction in aid of Save the Children. Craft people all over Britain donated work, the Craftsman offices in Littlehampton were turned into storage space for all the donated pieces, which ranged from pots by well-known ceramicists Lucie Rie, Michael Cardew and Janet Leach, through to precious metal jewellery, designer clothes, toys and teddy bears - all manner of work from both professional and hobby crafts people. Clandon Park, a National Trust Property in the South East of England, was hired as the venue for the auction, which took place over a weekend just before Christmas. People working in the craft industry donated their time to help with the auction - craft fair organisers, craft makers, friends and family. This unique event not only raised a substantial amount of money for charity, it also brought the British Craft industry together in a way that had never happened before.

=== National Fleece to Jumper Spinning Competition ===
In the same year, 1986, Craftsman Magazine organised the first National Fleece to Jumper Spinning Competition, which ran for 10 years at various craft fair venues in England, drawing supporters and participants from all over the world, including New Zealand, where the competition originated. Up to six teams, each made up of six people took part. The challenge was to knit a child's size jumper from a raw, unwashed fleece using a previously unseen pattern in the shortest possible time within a four-hour time limit. Teams started by sorting the fleece and selecting the best fibres. These were then carded, spun, plied and knitted. The final Fleece to Jumper Spinning Competition was held in 1995 at East Riddlesden Hall, Keighley, West Yorkshire, a National Trust property. It was won by the Craven Guild, who retained the title and the trophy as it was their third consecutive win. It was also the 10th year of the competition and the centenary year of the National Trust, a timely conclusion to a popular competition.

The Craftsman Magazine Fleece to Jumper Speed Record was developed from the main competition and gave individual teams the opportunity to work against the clock to a set pattern, without competing with any other teams at the same time. In 1989 the Cambridge Carders set the first record at 3 hours, 7 minutes, 5 seconds. The record was subsequently broken a number of times, but the Cambridge Carders finally reclaimed it at the Alexandra Palace Christmas Craft Fair, setting a time of 2 hours, 46 minutes, 12 seconds.

=== Craftmakers Materials Show ===
In October 1999, Craftsman Magazine organised their first Craftmakers Materials Show in London. Exhibitors were companies which supplied materials, equipment and services to craftspeople and hobbyists, plus craft guilds and associations, artists, designers and craft book publishers. Visitors could purchase art and craft supplies, watch demonstrations of art and craft techniques, take part in workshops and business advice sessions. Held annually until 2002, also in Harrogate from 2001 - 2002.

== Craftsman Magazine Awards ==
=== British Craft Trade Fair Newcomer Award ===
In 1996, Craftsman Magazine sponsored the Newcomer Award at the British Craft Trade Fair in Harrogate, North Yorkshire, for the first time. The winner was Christine Cummings from Ormskirk in Lancashire with her Ceramic Swine sculptures. (Sponsorship of this competition continues under the magazine's new title of Craftsman craft&design Magazine).

Ros Ingram, winner of the Craftsman Magazine Student Award at Art in Clay 1998

=== Student Award at Art in Clay ===
In 1999, Craftsman Magazine sponsored the Student Award at Art in Clay (a ceramics show held at Hatfield, Hertfordshire) for the first time. It was presented in recognition of the quality of design and making of the work exhibited, the student/graduate's potential to earn a living from their work. The aim of the award was to help a young graduate to start up and run a successful business working as a potter or ceramic artist. In 1999, the award was presented to Mirka Golden-Hann for her hand thrown salt glazed pottery. Sponsored until 2007, the final Craftsman Magazine Student Award went to Kerry Williamson. Each year's winner had their work featured as a front cover article in Craftsman Magazine and were also presented with a commemorative plate specially made by Laurence McGowan.

=== Craftsman Award at Potfest ===
In 2002, Craftsman Magazine sponsored the potters’ competition at Potfest in the Pens (a ceramics show held in Penrith, Cumbria) for the first time. The concept of the competition was for exhibitors at Potfest in the Pens to make a piece to reflect a specific theme; the challenge was to use techniques different from those they usually employed in their work. With a theme of ‘Dish of the Day’ in 2002, the winner was Dennis Kilgallon of Red Dust Ceramics, whose work was subsequently the subject of a front cover feature 138 January 2003. (Sponsorship of this competition continues under the magazine's new title of Craftsman craft&design Magazine).
