= Motor Boat & Yachting =

- Cover of the November 2024 issue
- Editor-in-chief: Hugo Andreae
- Categories: Motorboats, yachting
- Frequency: Monthly
- Circulation: 12,217 (ABC Jan - Dec 2013); Print and digital editions.
- Publisher: Future PLC
- First issue: July 1904
- Country: United Kingdom
- Language: English
- Website: Motor Boat & Yachting

Motor Boat & Yachting magazine is a monthly magazine about motorboats and yachting published by Future PLC. The editor-in-chief is Hugo Andreae.

== Early history ==
The magazine was established in July 1904.
