= Sporting Gun =

British shooting magazine

- Cover of the April 2026 issue
- Categories: Shooting
- Frequency: Monthly
- Circulation: 25,436 (ABC Jan - Dec 2013); Print and digital editions
- Founded: 1977
- First issue: 1977
- Company: Time Well Spent Group
- Country: United Kingdom
- Based in: London
- Language: English
- Website: https://www.shootinguk.co.uk/

Sporting Gun is a monthly sporting publication covering game and clay shooting. It is published by Time Well Spent Group.

The magazine was sold by former owner Future plc to Fieldsports Press Ltd. in 2023.

Fieldsports Press rebranded to Time Well Spent Group in 2024.

== History and profile ==
Sporting Gun was established in 1978. The current managing editor is Matt Kidd.
