= 360 (magazine) =

Xbox 360 video games magazine published by Imagine Publishing

- Issue 39 (August 2008) of 360 – The cover art features Far Cry 2.
- Editor: Nick Jones
- Categories: Video games
- Frequency: Three-weekly
- Circulation: 12,939 (Jul 08 – Dec 08); 13,007 (Jan 08 – Jun 08); 13,364 (Jul 07 – Dec 07)
- Publisher: Imagine Publishing
- First issue: 19 August 2005
- Final issue: 2012
- Country: United Kingdom
- Based in: Bournemouth
- Language: English
- Website: www.360magazine.co.uk
- ISSN: 1747-7859

360 was an Xbox 360 video games magazine published by Imagine Publishing in the UK. Originally published four-weekly, the magazine switched to a three-weekly schedule in 2009.

The magazine was withdrawn from sale following its merger with sister publication X360 in July 2012.

== Overview ==
The magazine was split into four main sections: Agenda, Foreplay, Reviews, and Live Style. The double page spread on pages eight and nine, called Thread, was composed of emails, letters and posts or sections of posts from the 360 magazine forum. On page nine, there was a pie chart showing votes cast on the 360 magazine forum on a different subject every week, which was chosen by the magazine staff. There were also two features following the Reviews section that sometimes were as long as ten pages. As a standard, the magazine was 130 pages long.

== Merger with X360 ==
On 7 June 2012, Imagine announced to 360's forum that 360 and its sister publication, X360, were to merge under the latter's name. As a result, 360 was to be withdrawn from sale, with no further issues published.

The first issue of the new X360 went on sale on 11 July 2012.
