= Nature of Wales =

Natur Cymru ~ Nature of Wales
- Issue 59 – Summer 2016
- Editor: Lizzie Wilberforce
- Former editors: James Robertson
- Categories: Nature magazine
- Frequency: Biannual
- Publisher: INCC
- Founded: 2001
- Country: United Kingdom
- Website: natureconservation.wales/about-incc//
- ISSN: 1742-3740

The magazine Natur Cymru (or Nature of Wales) is a subscription-based bilingual magazine that covers nature and the environment in Wales, including environmental politics and conservation. It released its first issue in Summer 2001; it published its 50th edition in spring 2014. In 2012 it ran a nature writing competition; the judging panel included Gillian Clarke.

For 16 years (2001–2017), Natur Cymru – Nature of Wales was in publication as a quarterly, not-for-profit, high-quality, paper publication. It met the need for a journal of record about the wildlife and natural resources of Wales whilst also uniquely filling a publishing gap between a news magazine and an academic journal. In this way, it fulfilled the very important role of enabling non-specialists as well as specialists to engage with this important agenda and with each other and therefore raised the level of knowledge and understanding of the natural environment across the board.

During these years, Natural Resources Wales (NRW) and its predecessor bodies (Countryside Council for Wales, Forestry Commission Wales and Environment Agency Wales) supported Natur Cymru - Nature of Wales financially as an all-Wales journal with an independent voice in the Welsh environment field. However, in February 2016, whilst recognising the value of the publication, NRW regretfully decided that their support for the magazine would end in June 2016. Through crowd-funded donations, publication continued for a short time but the magazine was unable to cover its costs unsupported and was forced to cease publishing in spring 2017.

In 2020, the original board of the magazine agreed with INCC CEO Rob Parry to transfer the publication and its remaining assets to the charity Initiative for Nature Conservation Cymru (INCC) (charity number: 1180113). The magazine is now being published by INCC, biannually and in a larger format, with the first of the re-launched issues dated winter 2020/21 (issue number 63, to continue from its final 2017 issue, number 62).
