= Computer Music (magazine) =

British electronic music magazine

- Cover of the final issue (November 2024)
- Editor: Andy Price
- Categories: Music
- Frequency: Monthly
- Publisher: Future plc
- Total circulation: 11,379 (December 2012)
- First issue: October 1998
- Final issue Number: November 2024; 340
- Country: United Kingdom
- Language: English
- Website: www.computermusic.co.uk

Computer Music was a monthly magazine published by Future plc in the UK. It covered the topic of creating digital music on a computer. In the past, each issue included a DVD-ROM with samples, plug-ins, software demos, tutorials, and other content related to the issue. Later, downloadable content was offered via a dedicated webpage. The magazine ceased publication after issue 340, with the staff joining sister website MusicRadar.
