= List of fanzines =

== Current publications ==
The following is a chronological list of noteworthy fanzines that are still being published.

| Dates of publication | Title | Language | Genre | Base | References |
|---|---|---|---|---|---|
| 1973-present | Diplomacy World | English | roleplay zine | United States of America | |
| 1982–present | Maximum Rocknroll | English | punk zine | San Francisco (USA) | |
| 1983-present | Ugly Things | English | musical zine | La Mesa (USA) | |
| 1987-present ? | My Comrade | English | queer zine | New-York City (USA) | |
| 1989-present | Ox-Fanzine | German | punk zine | Solingen (DE) | |
| 1991-present ? | SCAM | English | anarcho-punk zine | Argentina and United States of America | |
| 1994-present | Death to the World | English | religious zine | St Herman of Alaska Monastery (USA) | |
| 1996-present | Lady Churchill's Rosebud Wristlet | English | sci-fi zine | Northampton (USA) | |
| 1997-present | Fahrenheit | Polish | sci-fi zine | Online | |
| 1997-present | The Positives | Portuguese | punk zine | Portugal | |
| 1999-present | Red Inc. | English | football (Shelbourne F.C.) | Dublin, Ireland | |
| 2001-present | Razorcake | English | punk zine | Los Angeles (USA) | |
| 2012-present | 8-Ball Community | English | artistic zine | New-York City (USA) | |
| 2008-present | Journey Planet | English | sci-fi zine | Dublin (IE) and Boulder Creek (USA) | |

== Defunct ==
The following is a chronological list of noteworthy fanzines that are now defunct.

| Dates of publication | Title | Language | | Base | References |
|---|---|---|---|---|---|
| 1930-1933 | The Comet | English | sci-fi zine | Chicago (USA) | |
| 1932-1933 | The Time Traveller | English | sci-fi zine | New-York City (USA) | |
| 1933-1935 | Fantasy Fan | English | weird fiction zine | United States of America | |
| 1938-2001 | Le Zombie | English | sci-fi zine | Bloomington (USA) | |
| 1939-1940 | Futuria Fantasia | English | sci-fi zine | United States of America | |
| 1942-1946 | The Acolyte | English | sci-fi zine | Los Angeles (USA) | |
| 1948-1957 | Sky Hook | English | sci-fi zine | United States of America | |
| 1952-1965 | Hyphen | English | sci-fi zine | Ireland | |
| 1953-1986 | Yandro | English | sci-fi zine | North Manchester (USA) | |
| 1960-1963 | Xero | English | sci-fi zine | Pittsburgh (USA) | |
| 1960-1994 | Habakkuk | English | sci-fi zine | Berkeley (USA) | |
| 1961-1999 | Alter Ego | English | comics zine | Raleigh (USA) | |
| 1962-1998 | Niekas | English | sci-fi zine | Center Harbor (USA) | |
| 1963-1984 | Algol | English | sci-fi zine | New-York City (USA) | |
| 1967-1970 | Cinefantastique | English | sci-fi zine | Forest Park (Illinois) (USA) | |
| 1968-1971 | BeABohema | English | sci-fi zine | Quakertown (Pennsylvania) (USA) | |
| 1970s ? | Granfalloon | English | sci-fi zine | Pittsburgh (USA) | |
| 1971-1976 | Denim delinquent | English | rock zine | Ottawa (Canada) and Los Angeles (USA) | |
| 1973-1991 | Thrust | English | sci-fi zine | University of Maryland (USA) | |
| 1974-2004 | Japanese Giants | English | sci-fi zine | United States of America | |
| 1975-1976 | Charlton Bullseye | English | sci-fi zine | Indianapolis (USA) | |
| 1975-1980 | Janus | English | feminist sci-fi zine | Madison (USA) | |
| 1975-2025 | Alarums and Excursions | English | roleplay zine | Los Angeles (USA) | |
| 1976–1977 | Sniffin' Glue | English | punk zine | London (UK) | |
| 1976-1998 | Lan's Lantern | English | sci-fi zine | United States of America | |
| 1977-1980 | Slash | English | punk zine | Los Angeles (USA) | |
| 1977-2002 | Flipside | English | punk zine | Pasadena (USA) | |
| 1978-1979 | Sluggo! | English | punk zine | Austin (USA) | |
| 1978-1981 | Fantasy Newsletter | English | sci-fi zine | Boca Raton (USA) | |
| 1978-1998 | Mainstream | English | sci-fi zine | Seattle (USA) | |
| 1979-1981 | Damage | English | punk zine | San Francisco (USA) | |
| 1979-1984 | OP Magazine | English | punk zine | Olympia (USA) | |
| 1980s | Garage | English | punk zine | Dunedin (NZ) | |
| 1980-1981 | Capitol Crisis | English | punk zine | Washington, D.C. (USA) | |
| 1981-1982 | Alien Star | English | sci-fi zine | England | |
| 1981-1987 | Chanacomchana | Portuguese | lesbian zine | São Paulo (BRA) | |
| 1981–2005 | Processed World | English | anarchist zine | San Francisco (USA) | |
| 1982-1987 | Izzard | English | sci-fi zine | United States of America | |
| 1982-2003 | Mimosa | English | sci-fi zine | Gaithersburg (USA) | |
| 1982-2003 | Suburban Voice | English | punk zine | Swampscott (USA) | |
| 1983-1986 | Matter | English | punk zine | Evanston and Hoboken (USA) | |
| 1983-2018 | Trap Door | English | sci-fi zine | United States of America | |
| 1984-2000s | Green Anarchist | English | anarchist zine | London (UK) | |
| 1985-1991 | J.D.s | English | queer anarcho-punk zine | Canada | |
| 1986-2009 | The "E" Ticket | English | historical zine | United States of America | |
| 1987-2002 | Nova Express | English | sci-fi zine | Austin (USA) | |
| 1987-2007 | Slug and Lettuce | English | punk zine | State College (USA) | |
| 1988-1991 | Homocore | English | queer anarcho-punk zine | San Francisco (USA) | |
| 1989-2013 | Profane Existence | English | anarchist zine | Minneapolis (USA) | |
| late 1980s-early 1990s | Aslan | English | sci-fi zine | Brighton and then York (UK) | |
| late 1980s ? | Chainsaw Records | English | queer anarcho-punk zine | Portland (USA) | |
| 1990-? | Girl Germs | English | feminist zine | Oregon (USA) | |
| 1990-1999 | Diseased Pariah News | English | HIV/AIDS zine | San Francisco (USA) | |
| early 1990s-2012 | C.h.u.n.k. 666 | English | biker club zine | Portland and Brooklyn (USA) | |
| 1992-2005 | Amberzine | English | roleplay zine | United States of America | |
| 1992-2008 ? | Fanorama | English | queer zine | Rhode Island (USA) | |
| 1993-1995 | gendertrash from hell | English | trans zine | Toronto (Canada) | |
| 1994-2003 | Danzine | English | sex worker zine | Portland (USA) | |
| 1994-2007 | Punk Planet | English | punk zine | Chicago (USA) | |
| 1995-2006 | Emerald City | English | sci-fi zine | Australia, USA and the United Kingdom | |
| 1995-2019 | The Monitor | English | student zine | Kirksville (USA) | |
| 1998-2002 | ChickClick | English | feminist zine | Online | |
| 1999-2008 | MensuHell | French | comics zine | Montreal (Canada) | |
| 2001-2010 | Abolishing the Borders from Below | English | anarchist zine | Berlin (DE) | |
| 2001-2014 | Argentus | English | sci-fi zine | Deerfield (Illinois) (USA) | |
| 2003-2008 | Rancid News | English | anarchist zine | London (UK) | |
| 2005-2007 | The End Is Nigh | English | apocalyptic zine | United Kingdom | |
| 2007-early 2010s ? | Fever Zine | English | music zine | London (UK) | |
| 2010 | Fucking Trans Women | English | sexual practice zine | United States of America | |
