= Fanzine =

Magazine published by fans

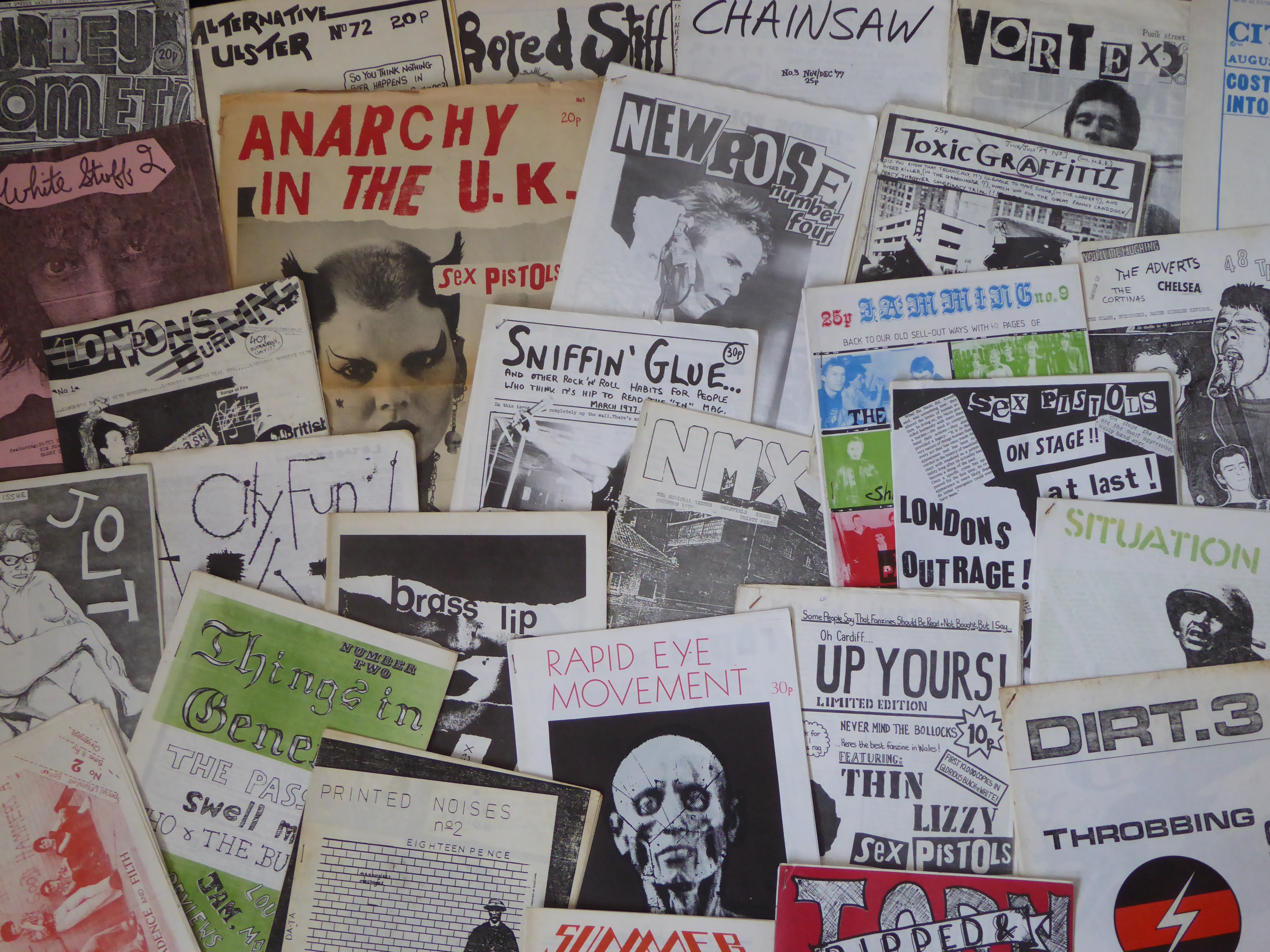
British punk and post-punk fanzines from the 1970s

A fanzine (blend of fan and magazine or zine) is a non-professional and non-official publication produced by enthusiasts of a particular cultural phenomenon (such as a literary or musical genre) for the pleasure of others who share their interest.

The term was coined in an October 1940 science-fiction fanzine by Russ Chauvenet and first popularized within science fiction fandom, and from there the term was adopted by other communities.

Typically, publishers, editors, writers and other contributors of articles or illustrations to fanzines are not paid. Fanzines are traditionally circulated free of charge, or for a nominal cost to defray postage or production expenses. Copies are often offered in exchange for similar publications, or for contributions of art, articles, or letters of comment (LoCs), which are then published.

Some fanzines are typed and photocopied by amateurs using standard home office equipment. A few fanzines have developed into professional publications (sometimes known as "prozines"), and many professional writers were first published in fanzines; some continue to contribute to them after establishing a professional reputation. The term fanzine is sometimes confused with "fan magazine", but the latter term most often refers to commercially produced publications for (rather than by) fans.

== Origin ==
The origins of amateur fanac "fan" publications are obscure, but can be traced at least back to 19th century literary groups in the United States which formed amateur press associations to publish collections of amateur fiction, poetry, and commentary, such as H. P. Lovecraft's United Amateur.

As professional printing technology progressed, so did the technology of fanzines. Early fanzines were hand-drafted or typed on a manual typewriter and printed using primitive reproduction techniques (e.g., the spirit duplicator or even the hectograph). Only a very small number of copies could be made at a time, so circulation was extremely limited. The use of mimeograph machines enabled greater press runs, and the photocopier increased the speed and ease of publishing once more. Today, thanks to the advent of desktop publishing and self-publication, there is often little difference between the appearance of a fanzine and a professional magazine.

== Genres ==
=== Science fiction ===
When Hugo Gernsback published the first science fiction magazine, Amazing Stories in 1926, he allowed for a large letter column which printed reader's addresses. By 1927 readers, often young adults, would write to each other, bypassing the magazine. Science fiction fanzines had their beginnings in Serious & Constructive (later shortened to sercon) correspondence. The fans would start up clubs to ease finding others with their same interests. Gernsback founded the Science Fiction League in 1934, where these clubs could advertise for more users.

The first science fiction fanzine, The Comet, was published in 1930 by the Science Correspondence Club in Chicago and edited by Raymond A. Palmer and Walter Dennis. The term "fanzine" was coined by Russ Chauvenet in the October 1940 edition of his fanzine Detours. "Fanzines" were distinguished from "prozines" (a term Chauvenet also invented), that is, all professional magazines. Prior to that, the fan publications were known as "fanmags".

Science fiction fanzines used a variety of printing methods. Typewriters, school dittos, church mimeos and (if they could afford it) multi-color letterpress or other mid-to-high level printing. Some fans wanted their news spread, others reveled in the artistry and beauty of fine printing. The hectograph, introduced around 1876, was so named because it could produce (in theory) up to a hundred copies. Hecto used an aniline dye, transferred to a tray of gelatin, and paper would be placed on the gel, one sheet at a time, for transfer. Messy and smelly, the process could create vibrant colors for the few copies produced, the easiest aniline dye to make being purple (technically indigo). The next small but significant technological step after hectography is the spirit duplicator, essentially the hectography process using a drum instead of the gelatin. Introduced by Ditto Corporation in 1923, these machines were known for the next six decades as Ditto Machines and used by fans because they were cheap to use and could (with a little effort) print in color.

The mimeograph machine, which forced ink through a wax paper stencil cut by the keys of a typewriter, was the standard for many decades. A second-hand mimeo could print hundreds of copies and (with more than a little effort) print in color. The electronic stencil cutter (shortened to "electrostencil" by most) could add photographs and illustrations to a mimeo stencil. A mimeo'd zine could look terrible or look beautiful, depending more on the skill of the mimeo operator than the quality of the equipment. Only a few fans could afford more professional printers, or the time it took them to print, until photocopying became cheap and ubiquitous in the 1970s. With the advent of computer printers and desktop publishing in the 1980s, fanzines began to look far more professional. The rise of the internet made correspondence cheaper and much faster, and the World Wide Web has made publishing a fanzine as simple as coding a web page.

New technology brought various print style innovations. For example, there were alphanumeric contractions which are actually precursors to "leetspeak' (a well-known example is the "initials" used by Forrest J. Ackerman in his fanzines from the 1930s and 1940s, namely "4sj". Fans around the world knew Ackerman by three letters "4sj" or even two: "4e" for "Forry"). Fanspeak is rich with abbreviations and concatenations. Where teenagers labored to save typing on ditto masters, they now save keystrokes when text messaging. Ackerman invented nonstoparagraphing as a space-saving measure. When the typist comes to the end of a paragraph, they simply moved the platen down one line.

Never commercial enterprises, most science fiction fanzines were (and many still are) available for "the usual", a sample issue will be mailed on request. To receive further issues, a reader sends a "letter of comment" (LoC) about the fanzine to the editor. The LoC might be published in the next issue; some fanzines consisted almost exclusively of letter columns, where discussions were conducted in much the same way as they are in internet newsgroups and mailing lists today, though at a relatively glacial pace. Often fanzine editors ("faneds") would simply swap issues with each other, not worrying too much about matching trade for trade, somewhat like being on one another's friends list. Without being closely connected with the rest of fandom, a budding faned could read fanzine reviews in prozines, and fanzines reviewed other fanzines. Recent technology has changed the speed of communication between fans and the technology available, but the basic concepts developed by science fiction fanzines in the 1930s can be seen online today. Blogs—with their threaded comments, personalized illustrations, shorthand in-jokes, wide variety in quality and wider variety of content—follow the structure developed in science fiction fanzines, without (usually) realizing the antecedent.

Since 1937, science fiction fans have formed amateur press associations (APAs); the members contribute to a collective assemblage or bundle that contains contributions from all of them, called apazines and often containing mailing comments. Some APAs are still active, and some are published as virtual "e-zines", distributed on the Internet. Specific Hugo Awards are given for fanzines, fan writing and fanart.

==== Media ====
Media fanzines were originally merely a subgenre of SF fanzines, written by science fiction fans already familiar with apazines. The first media fanzine was a Star Trek fan publication called Spockanalia, published in September 1967 by members of the Lunarians. They hoped that fanzines such as Spockanalia would be recognized by the broader science-fiction fan community in traditional ways, such as a Hugo Award for Best Fanzine. All five of its issues were published while the show was still on the air, and included letters from D. C. Fontana, Gene Roddenberry, and most of the cast members, and an article by future Hugo and Nebula winner Lois McMaster Bujold.

Many other Star Trek 'zines followed, then slowly zines appeared for other media sources, such as Starsky and Hutch, Man from U.N.C.L.E. and Blake's 7. By the mid-1970s, there were enough media zines being published that adzines existed just to advertise all of the other zines available. Although Spockanalia contained a mixture of fiction, essays, artwork, and letters, fan fiction became the dominant content of many later media fanzines. Like SF fanzines, these media zines spanned the gamut of publishing quality from digest-sized mimeos to offset printed masterpieces with four-color covers.

Men wrote and edited most previous science fiction fanzines, which typically published articles reporting on trips to conventions, and reviews of books and other fanzines. Camille Bacon-Smith later stated that "One thing you almost never find in a science fiction fanzine is science fiction. Rather ... fanzines were the social glue that created a community out of a worldwide scattering of readers." Women published most media fanzines, which by contrast also included fan fiction. By doing so, they "fill the need of a mostly female audience for fictional narratives that expand the boundary of the official source products offered on the television and movie screen." In addition to long and short stories, as well as poetry, many media fanzines included illustrated stories, as well as stand alone art, often featuring portraits of the show or film's principal characters. The art could range from simple sketches, to reproductions of large elaborate works painted in oil or acrylic, though most are created in ink.

In the late 1970s, fiction that included a sexual relationship between two of the male characters of the media source (first Kirk/Spock, then later Starsky/Hutch, Napoleon/Illya, and many others) started to appear in zines. These became known as slash fiction from the '/' mark used in adzines. The slash help to differentiate a K&S story (which would have been a Kirk and Spock friendship story) from a K/S story, which would have been one with a romantic or sexual bent between the characters. Slash zines eventually had their own subgenres, such as Femslash. By 2000, when web publishing of stories became more popular than zine publishing, thousands of media fanzines had been published; over 500 of them were k/s zines.

Another popular franchise for fanzines was the "Star Wars" saga. By the time the film The Empire Strikes Back was released in 1980, Star Wars fanzines had surpassed Star Trek zines in sales. An unfortunate episode in fanzine history occurred in 1981 when Star Wars director George Lucas threatened to sue fanzine publishers who distributed zines featuring the Star Wars characters in sexually explicit stories or art.

Comics were mentioned and discussed as early as the late 1930s in the fanzines of science fiction fandom. Famously, the first version of Superman (a bald-headed villain) appeared in the third issue of Jerry Siegel and Joe Shuster's 1933 fanzine Science Fiction. In 1936, David Kyle published The Fantasy World, possibly the first fanzine to publish comic. Malcolm Willits and Jim Bradley started The Comic Collector's News in October 1947, the first fanzine about comics. By 1952, Ted White had mimeographed a four-page pamphlet about Superman, and James Vincent Taurasi, Sr. issued the short-lived Fantasy Comics. In 1953, Bhob Stewart published The EC Fan Bulletin, which launched EC fandom of imitative EC fanzines. A few months later, Stewart, White, and Larry Stark produced Potrzebie, planned as a literary journal of critical commentary about EC by Stark. Among the wave of EC fanzines that followed, the best-known was Ron Parker's Hoo-Hah!. After that came fanzines by the followers of Harvey Kurtzman's Mad, Trump and Humbug. Publishers of these included future underground comics stars like Jay Lynch and Robert Crumb.

In 1960, Richard and Pat Lupoff launched their science fiction and comics fanzine Xero. In the second issue, "The Spawn of M.C. Gaines'" by Ted White was the first in a series of nostalgic, analytical articles about comics by Lupoff, Don Thompson, Bill Blackbeard, Jim Harmon and others under the heading, All in Color for a Dime. In 1961, Jerry Bails' Alter Ego, devoted to costumed heroes, became a focal point for superhero comics fandom and is thus sometimes mistakenly cited as the first comics fanzine.

Contacts through these magazines were instrumental in creating the culture of modern comics fandom: conventions, collecting, etc. Much of this, like comics fandom itself, began as part of standard science fiction conventions, but comics fans have developed their own traditions. Comics fanzines often include fan artwork based on existing characters as well as discussion of the history of comics. Through the 1960s, and 1970s, comic fanzines followed some general formats, such as the industry news and information magazine (The Comic Reader was one example), interview, history, and review-based fanzines, and the fanzines which basically represented independent comic book-format exercises. While perceived quality varied widely, the energy and enthusiasm involved tended to be communicated clearly to the readership, many of whom were also fanzine contributors. Prominent comics zines of this period included Alter Ego, The Comic Reader, and Rocket's Blast Comicollector, all started by Jerry Bails. During the 1970s, many fanzines (Squa Tront, as an example) also became partly distributed through certain comic book distributors.

One of the first British comics fanzines was Phil Clarke's KA-POW, launched in 1967. Prominent British comics fanzines of the 1970s and early 1980s included the long-running Fantasy Advertiser, Martin Lock's BEM, Richard Burton's Comic Media News, Alan Austin's Comics Unlimited, George Barnett's The Panelologist, and Richard Ashford's Speakaeasy.

At times, the professional comics publishers have made overtures to fandom via 'prozines', in this case fanzine-like magazines put out by the major publishers. The Amazing World of DC Comics and the Marvel magazine FOOM began and ceased publication in the 1970s. Priced significantly higher than standard comics of the period (AWODCC was $1.50, FOOM was 75 cents), each house-organ magazine lasted a brief period of years. Since 2001 in Britain, there have been created a number of fanzines pastiching children's comics of the 1970s, and 1980s (e.g. Solar Wind, Pony School, etc.). These adopt a style of storytelling rather than specific characters from their sources, usually with a knowing or ironic twist.

=== Film ===
==== Horror ====
Horrors of the Screen No. 3, 1964

As with comics zines, horror film fanzines grew from related interest within science fiction fan publications. Trumpet, edited by Tom Reamy, was a 1960s SF zine that branched into horror film coverage. Alex Soma's Horrors of the Screen, Calvin T. Beck's Journal of Frankenstein (later Castle of Frankenstein) and Gary Svehla's Gore Creatures were the first horror fanzines created as more serious alternatives to the popular Forrest J Ackerman 1958 magazine Famous Monsters of Filmland. Gore Creatures began in 1961 and continues today as the prozine (and specialty publisher) Midnight Marquee. Garden Ghouls Gazette—a 1960s horror title under the editorship of Dave Keil, then Gary Collins—was eventually headed by the late Frederick S. Clarke (1949–2000) and in 1967 became the respected journal Cinefantastique. It later became a prozine under journalist-screenwriter Mark A. Altman and has continued as a webzine.

Mark Frank's Photon—notable for the inclusion of an 8x10 photo in each issue—was another 1960s zine that lasted into the 1970s.Richard Klemensen's Little Shoppe of Horrors, having a particular focus on "Hammer Horrors", began in 1972 and has been publishing for over 50 years, with its final issue announced for 2026. The Animation Journal (1964-1966) edited by Indiana natives Steve Towsley and Bill Shrock was perhaps the first fanzine devoted to the makers of stop-motion animated monsters.

The Baltimore-based Black Oracle (1969–1978) from writer-turned-John Waters repertory member George Stover was a diminutive zine that evolved into the larger-format Cinemacabre. Stover's Black Oracle partner Bill George published his own short-lived zine The Late Show (1974–1976; with co-editor Martin Falck), and later became editor of the Cinefantastique prozine spinoff Femme Fatales. In the mid-1970s, North Carolina teenager Sam Irvin published the horror/science-fiction fanzine Bizarre, which included his original interviews with UK actors and filmmakers; Irvin would later become a producer-director in his own right. Japanese Fantasy Film Journal (JFFJ) (1968–1983) from Greg Shoemaker covered Toho's Godzilla and his Asian brethren. Japanese Giants (JG) was founded by Stephen Mark Rainey in 1974 and was published for 30 years. In 1993, G-FAN was published, and reached its 100th regularly published issue in Fall 2012. FXRH (Special effects by Ray Harryhausen) (1971–1976) was a specialized zine co-created by future Hollywood FX artist Ernest D. Farino.

==== Conclave ====
The 2024 film Conclave directed by Edward Berger gained a significant following online. A fanzine for the film was published which co-founder Susan Bin described as "a snapshot of the fandom". By February 2025, the zine "has already raised an estimated $45,000 for charities including the Intersex Human Rights Fund."

=== Rock and roll ===
By the mid-1960s, several fans active in science fiction and comics fandom recognized a shared interest in rock music, and the rock fanzine was born. Paul Williams and Greg Shaw were two such SF-fans turned rock zine editors. Williams' Crawdaddy! (1966) and Shaw's two California-based zines, Mojo Navigator (full title, "Mojo-Navigator Rock and Roll News") (1966) and Who Put the Bomp, (1970), are among the most important early rock fanzines.

Crawdaddy! (1966) quickly moved from its fanzine roots to become one of the first rock music "prozines", with paid advertisers and newsstand distribution. Bomp remained a fanzine, featuring many writers who would later become prominent music journalists, including Lester Bangs, Greil Marcus, Ken Barnes, Ed Ward, Dave Marsh, Metal Mike Saunders and R. Meltzer. Bomp featured cover art by Jay Kinney and Bill Rotsler, both veterans of SF and Comics fandom. Bomp was not alone; an August 1970 issue of Rolling Stone included an article about the explosion of rock fanzines. Other rock fanzines of this period include denim delinquent 1971, edited by Jymn Parrett, Flash, 1972, edited by Mark Shipper, Eurock Magazine (1973–1993) edited by Archie Patterson and Bam Balam, written and published by Brian Hogg in East Lothian, Scotland, beginning in 1974, and in the mid-1970s, Back Door Man.

In the post-punk era, several well-written fanzines emerged that cast an almost academic look at earlier, neglected musical forms, including Mike Stax' Ugly Things, Billy Miller and Miriam Linna's Kicks, Jake Austen's Roctober, Kim Cooper's Scram, P. Edwin Letcher's Garage & Beat, and the UK's Shindig! and Italy's Misty Lane.

In the 1980s, with the rise of stadium superstars, many home-grown rock fanzines emerged. At the peak of Bruce Springsteen's megastardom following the Born in the U.S.A. album and Born in the U.S.A. Tour in the mid-1980s, there were no less than five Springsteen fanzines circulating at the same time in the UK alone, and many others elsewhere. Gary Desmond's Candy's Room, coming from Liverpool, was the first in 1980, quickly followed by Dan French's Point Blank, Dave Percival's The Fever, Jeff Matthews' Rendezvous, and Paul Limbrick's Jackson Cage. In the US, Backstreets Magazine started in Seattle in 1980 and still continues today as a glossy publication, now in communication with Springsteen's management and official website. In the late 1990s, numerous fanzines and e-zines flourished about electronic and post-rock music. Crème Brûlée fanzine was one of those that documented post-rock genre and experimental music.

=== Punk ===
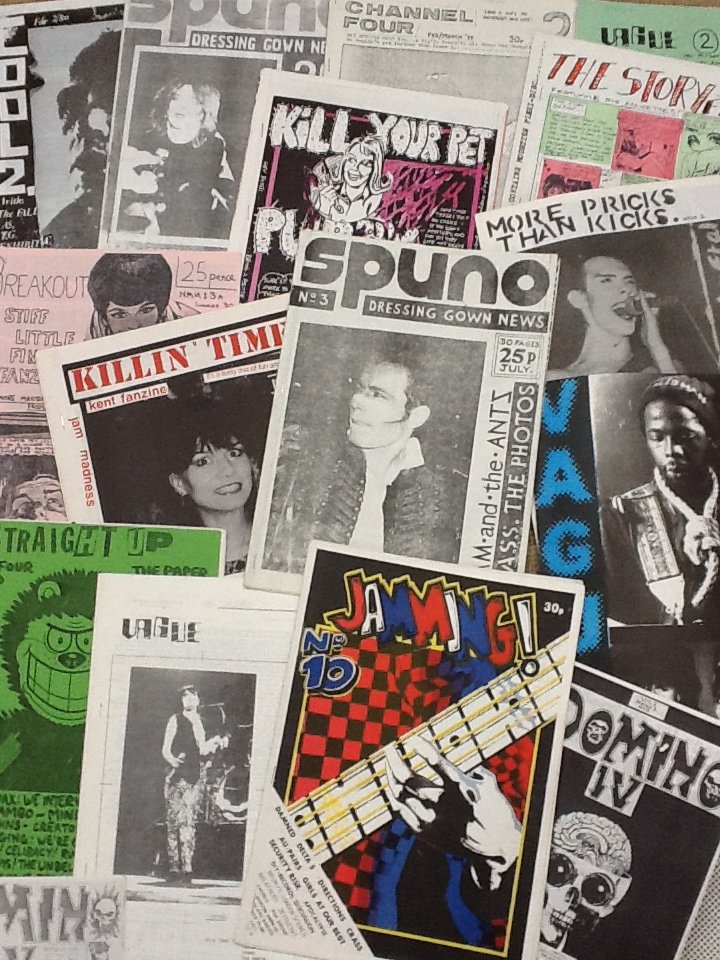
British punk fanzines from the 1970s

==== United Kingdom ====
The punk subculture in the United Kingdom spearheaded a surge of interest in fanzines as a countercultural alternative to established print media. In his 1985 book One Chord Wonders, Dave Laing argues that fanzines, along with self-produced 7" single records, were the essence of 'punk difference'. Matt Worley, in Xerox Machine, sees the significance of fanzines in punk as both at the time a response to 'an out-of-touch [mainstream] music press' and retrospectively as a way of 'trac[ing] punk's cultural influence into the backrooms, bedrooms and side streets of Britain'. The first and still best known UK 'punk zine' was Sniffin' Glue, produced by Deptford punk fan Mark Perry. Sniffin' Glue ran for 12 photocopied issues; the first issue was produced by Perry immediately following (and in response to) the London debut of The Ramones on 4 July 1976. Other UK fanzines included Ablaze! Blam!, Bombsite, Wool City Rocker, Burnt Offering, Sideburns, Chainsaw, New Crimes, Vague, Jamming, Artcore Fanzine, Love and Molotov Cocktails, To Hell With Poverty, New Youth, Peroxide, ENZK, Juniper beri-beri, No Cure, Communication Blur, Rox, Grim Humour, Spuno, Cool Notes and Fumes. Of these, Tony Fletcher's Jamming was the most far reaching, becoming a nationally distributed mainstream magazine for several years before its demise.

==== United States ====
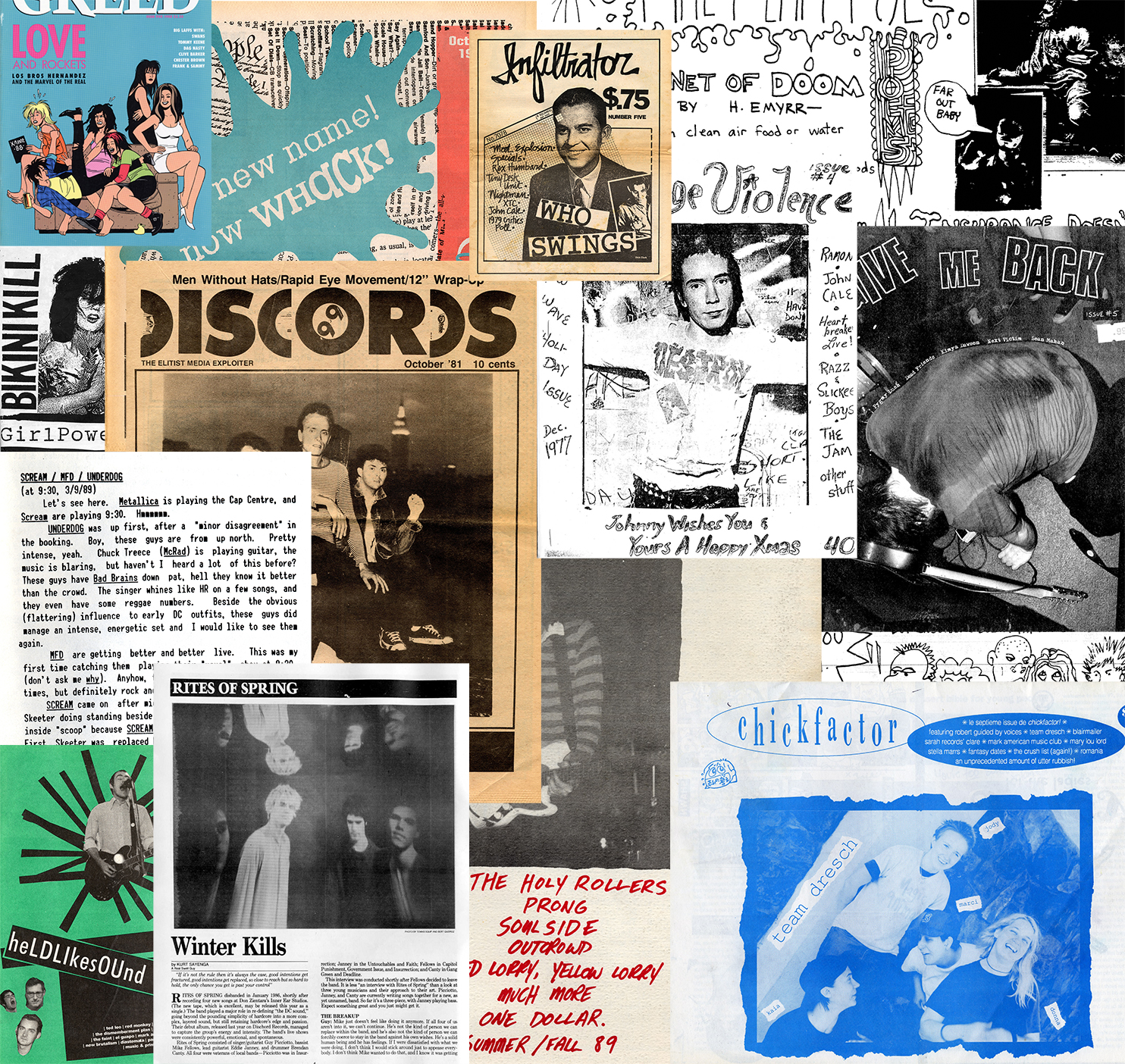
Fanzines from the Washington, D.C. punk subculture.

In the United States, Punk began publication in 1976 out of New York City and played a major part in popularizing punk rock (a term coined a few years earlier in Creem) as the term for the music and the bands being written about.

Flipside and Slash were important punk fanzines from the Los Angeles scene, both debuting in 1977. The San Francisco-based punk fanzine Search and Destroy, which published from 1977 to 1979, eventually became the influential fringe-cultural magazine Re/Search. Damage published 13 issues there from 1979 to 1981. Maximum RocknRoll, also from San Francisco, was a major punk fanzine, with over 300 issues published since 1982.

The Washington, D.C. punk community generated several fanzines in the late 1970s and early 1980s, such as Capitol Crisis, Vintage Violence, Thrillseeker, If This Goes On, and Descenes.

As punk and alternative culture grew more popular throughout the 1980s and 1990s—evidenced by the success of punk and alternative rock bands like Sonic Youth, Nirvana, Fugazi, Bikini Kill, Green Day and The Offspring—thousands of other punk fanzines appeared in the United States, such as Punk Planet, Left of the Dial, Tail Spins, Sobriquet, Profane Existence and Slug and Lettuce.

Some punk fanzines from the 1980s, like No Class and Ugly American experienced a second life by placing all past content online for free and adding new content. Although fewer in number in the 21st century, punk fanzines still exist in the United States, such as Suburban Rebels and Razorcake, both from California.

Most punk fanzines were printed in small quantities and promoted their respective local scenes. They were often cheaply photocopied and many never survived beyond a few issues. Their greatest contribution was in promoting punk music, clothing, and lifestyle in their local communities. Punk bands and independent labels often sent records to the zines for review and many of the people who started the zines became critical connections for punk bands on tour.

==== Australia ====
In 1977, Bruce Milne and Clinton Walker fused their respective punk zines Plastered Press and Suicide Alley to launch Pulp; Milne later went on to invent the cassette zine with Fast Forward, in 1980.

==== Italy ====
In Perugia, Italy, Mazquerade ran from 1979 to 1981.

In Basilicata, Italy, Raw Art Fanzine ran from 1995 to 2000.

In Milan, Italy, Gorezilla ran from 1988 to 1991.

A mapping of Italian fanzines originating from the punk subculture in the 1980s is being developed on Capit Mundi? website.

==== Women in punk ====
The "Riot Grrrl" movement emerged from the punk scene in the US in the early 1990s when women began to produce zines with feminist themes. The "riot grrrl" wave was influential for "pinkzines" as it called for women to publish and produce content in the male-dominated culture.

Making Waves was a four-issue collective fanzine focused on punk and new wave music and feminism and womanhood created by Camille Lan in Paris, France, and Mary Jane Regalado in Los Angeles, first published in 2011, featuring articles and interviews from around the world.

==== After 2000 ====
In the UK, Fracture and Reason To Believe were significant fanzines in the early 2000s, but both ended in late 2003. Rancid News filled the gap left by these two zines for a short while. On its tenth issue Rancid News changed its name to Last Hours with 7 issues published under this title before going on hiatus. Last Hours still operates as a webzine, though with more focus on the anti-authoritarian movement than its original title. There are many smaller fanzines in existence throughout the UK that focus on punk.

Artcore Fanzine (established in 1986, relocated to the US in 2018) continues to this day, recently publishing a number of 40-year anniversary issues.

Mark Wilkins, promotion director for 1982 onwards US punk/thrash label Mystic Records, had over 450 US fanzines and 150 foreign fanzines he promoted to regularly. He and Mystic Records owner Doug Moody edited The Mystic News Newsletter which was published quarterly and went into every promo package to fanzines. Wilkins also published the Los Angeles punk humor zine Wild Times.

=== Mod ===
In the United Kingdom, the 1979 Mod revival, which was inspired by the 1960s Mod subculture, brought with it a burst of fresh creativity from fanzines, and for the next decade, the youth subculture inspired the production of dozens of independent publications. The most successful of the first wave was Maximum Speed, which successfully captured the frenetic world of a mod revival scene that was propelling bands like Secret Affair, Purple Hearts and The Chords into the UK charts.

After the genre had started to go out of fashion with mainstream audiences in 1981, the mod revival scene went underground and successfully reinvented itself through a series of clubs, bands and fanzines that breathed fresh life into the genre, culminating in another burst of creative acceptance in 1985. This success was largely driven by the network of underground fanzines, the most important and far reaching of which were Extraordinary Sensations, produced by future radio DJ Eddie Piller, and Shadows & Reflections, published by future national magazine editor Chris Hunt. The latter in particular pushed back the boundaries of fanzine production, producing glossy, professionally written and printed publications at a time (1983–1986) when most fanzines were produced via photocopier and letraset.

=== Local music ===
In the UK, there were also fanzines that covered the local music scene in a particular town or city. Mainly prevalent in the 1970s, and 1980s, all music styles were covered, whether the bands were playing rock, punk, metal, futurist, ska or dance. Featured were local gig reviews and articles that were below the radar of the mainstream music press. They were produced using the technology of the time, i.e. typewriter and Letraset. Examples include Bombsite Fanzine (Liverpool 1977), Wool City Rocker (Bradford 1979–1982), City Fun (Manchester), 1984, Spuno (Bath 1980), No Cure (Berkshire) and Town Hall Steps (Bolton) and more recently mono (fanzine), (Bradford) with many more across the country, such as Premonition Tapes Tapezine on cassette (Sheffield 1987) and Crime Pays (Liverpool 1988).

=== Role-playing-game fanzines ===
Another sizable group of fanzines arose in role-playing game (RPG) fandom, where fanzines allowed people to publish their ideas and views on specific games and their role-playing campaigns. In 1975, was released the apazine Alarums and Excursions.

Role-playing fanzines allowed people to communicate in the 1970s, and 1980s with complete editorial control in the hands of the players, as opposed to the game publishers. These early RPG fanzines were generally typed, sold mostly in an A5 format (in the UK) and were usually illustrated with abysmal or indifferent artwork.

A fanzine community developed and was based on sale to a reading public and exchanges by editor/publishers. Many of the pioneers of RPG got their start in, or remain part of, science fiction fandom. This is also true of the small but still active board game fandom scene, the most prolific subset of which is centered around play-by-mail Diplomacy.

The UK fanzine Aslan (1988–1991) was responsible for popularization of freeform role-playing games in the UK.

=== Video gaming ===
Video game fanzines first emerged during the second generation period at a time when gaming stores and newsletters for computer user groups were beginning to become established but had not yet receive significant recognition by purchasers and gamers. The earliest such publication was Joystick Jolter. Other subscriber-based newsletters included 8:16 (UK, all things Atari, 1st issue Nov 1987), The Video Game Update, later titled Computer Entertainer.

As desktop publishing tools became more accessible, there was an increase in fanzine production. Fanzines generally emphasized either classic gaming (e.g. 2600 Connection and Classic Systems & Games Monthly), or current gaming (e.g. APE and The Subversive Sprite). Less commonly, some fanzines covered both topics (e.g. Digital Press and Joystick & Screen). The number of zines grew with the development of video game journalism as writers like Arnie Katz and Chris Bieniek used their columns in mainstream magazines like Video Games & Computer Entertainment, EGM, and Tips & Tricks, to publish reviews of promising fanzines. These mainstream reviews had the effect of introducing fan editors to each other and of creating a fanzine scene.

The popularity of video game fanzines diminished greatly with the rise of the internet, however some zines—particularly the classic gaming ones (e.g. Classic Gamer Magazine and Video Game Collector)—continued beyond the mid-90s. The rise of "on demand" publishing has led to a new outlet for print zines, like Jumpbutton and Scroll.

The video game fanzine era was biggest in the US and Canada, but zines are also produced in other countries. Prominent video game fanzines produced in the UK include Retrogamer, Pixel Nation, Capcom Fanzine, Mercury, and Super Famicom Mini Mag among others. In France fanzines like Revival were circulated, and Japan has seen the production of lavish doujin works.

More recently, there has been a mini-resurgence in video game fanzines, with the launch of HyperPlay RPG in 2015 and Switch Player in 2017. Based in part on Super Play's focus on role-playing games and "any-bit" Nintendo, HyperPlay RPG received positive reviews by the mainstream video game media.

=== Wargaming ===
Several fanzines exist within the hobby of wargaming. Among them is Charge!, a leading international fanzine exclusively for miniature wargaming enthusiasts for the American Civil War period. Other fanzines support Warhammer and other popular rules sets.

=== Sport ===
The first association football fanzine is regarded as being Foul, a publication that ran between 1972 and 1976. In the UK, most Premier League or Football League football clubs have one or more fanzines which supplement, oppose and complement the club's official magazine or matchday programme. A reasonably priced zine has a guaranteed audience, as is the culture of passion in being a football fan.

The longest running fanzine is The City Gent, produced by supporters of Bradford City FC, which first went on sale at Valley Parade in November 1984 and is now in its 26th season. Following close on its heels was Nike, Inc. which was first released in 1989. At the time it was not the first of its kind with Terrace Talk (York City), which was first published in November 1981 and Wanderers Worldwide (Bolton Wanderers) having already been established but since disappeared. In 1985 the emergent When Saturday Comes (a fanzine without a specific club focus that was subsequently launched as a mainstream magazine) promoted a 'fanzine movement' that gave birth to many more club titles during the late 1980s which was something of a glory period for fanzines.

With the widespread availability of the Internet, much of the energy that was put into football fanzines subsequently went into the development of supporters' websites. Examples of other UK football fanzines include A Love Supreme (Sunderland), TOOFIF (Fulham), The Square Ball (Leeds United), 4,000 Holes (Blackburn Rovers) and War of the Monster Trucks (a Sheffield Wednesday fanzine named after a local TV station elected not to show the final scenes of an unlikely cup victory). The Queen's Park Rangers fanzine 'A Kick up the Rs' was first published in August 1987 and is still issuing an average of 10 issues per season.

Fanzines are not exclusive to the top tiers of football however, with Northern Counties East League side Scarborough Athletic FC having a fanzine titled Abandon Chip!, a pun based on both the perilous situation of predecessor club Scarborough FC and that club's sponsors, McCain.

And also away from the world of Football there were a number of established fanzines, for example Rugby league has such notable publications as Who The Hell Was St. George Anyway? Rugby League fanzine, by supporters of Doncaster RLFC and Scarlet Turkey of Salford City Reds.However, due to pressure from the Internet etc. these publications no longer exist in printed form. The title of World's longest running Rugby League fanzine now belongs to The Aye of the Tigers, by Castleford Tigers supporters. The fanzine movement has even spread to the United States, where ice hockey fans have produced several popular fanzines. In Chicago two examples include the formerly published Blue Line Magazine and currently The Committed Indian, both produced by Chicago Blackhawks fans. In St. Louis there are Game Night Revue and St Louis Game Time for the St. Louis Blues.

There are also a number of fanzines to be found in Ireland of which Shelbourne's Red Inc. has been running since 1999, and is the only one still in existence.

In the United States, sports fanzines are relatively rare. In Boston they are a bit more common. There are two fanzines sold outside Fenway Park including Yawkey Way Report, which is run by a former Marine.

== Recent developments ==
With the increasing availability of the Internet in the late 20th and the early 21st century, the traditional paper zine has begun to give way to the webzine (or "e-zine") that is easier to produce and uses the potential of the Internet to reach an ever-larger, possibly global, audience. Nonetheless, printed fanzines are still produced, either out of preference for the format or to reach people who do not have convenient Web access. Online versions of approximately 200 science fiction fanzines will be found at Bill Burns' eFanzines web site, along with links to other SF fanzine sites. In addition, zine festivals are held each year in American cities like Los Angeles, Chicago, and Brooklyn, as well as internationally in cities including Melbourne, Australia, and Glasgow, UK.

== See also ==
- alt.zines
- Amateur press association
- British small press comics
- Desktop publishing
- Dōjinshi
- Fandom
- Hugo Award for Best Fanzine
- Hugo Award for Best Semiprozine
- List of fanzines
- Minicomic Co-ops (The United Fanzine Organization)
- Minicomics
- Science fiction fandom
- Weblog
