= Punk zine =

Fanzines of punk rock

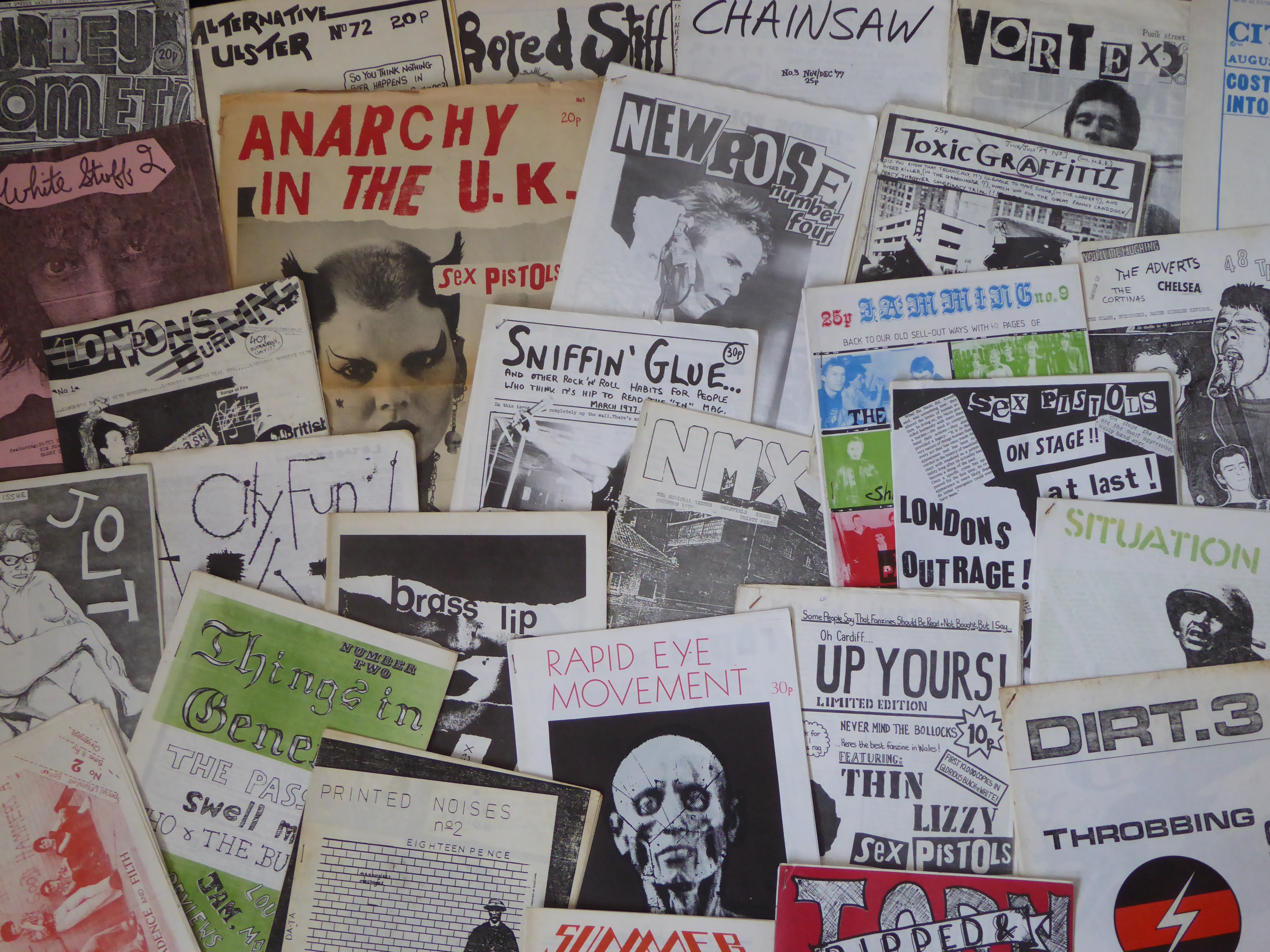
British punk fanzines from the 1970s.

A punk zine (or punkzine) is a zine related to the punk subculture and hardcore punk music genre. Often primitively or casually produced, they feature punk literature, such as social commentary, punk poetry, news, gossip, music reviews and articles about punk rock bands or regional punk scenes.

== History ==
=== Origins (1970s) ===
Starting in the 1970s, the DIY aesthetic of the punk subculture created a thriving underground press. Amateur magazines related to punk were inspired by the rock fanzines of the early 1970s, which were inspired by zines from the science fiction fan community. Perhaps the most influential of the fanzines to cross over from science fiction fandom to rock and, later, punk rock and new wave music was Greg Shaw's Who Put the Bomp, founded in 1970. Shaw would be credited with some of the earliest known uses of the term "punk" and "punk rock" in relation to rock music. In the March 1971 issue of Creem, he wrote about the Shadows of Knight's "hard-edge punk sound", while in an April 1971 issue of Rolling Stone, he referred to a track by the Guess Who as "good, not too imaginative, punk rock and roll".

The first ever punk zine was Punk, founded in New York City by John Holmstrom, Ged Dunn and Legs McNeil in late 1975. Debuting in January 1976, with their first article and Lou Reed as the cover art, the zine helped popularize the early New York CBGB scene, leading to the use of the term "punk rock" as a descriptor for contemporary music scenes, which at the time was used strictly to refer to mid-1960s garage rock. Other early punk zines from the United States included Search & Destroy (later REsearch), Flipside and Slash.

An early United Kingdom punk zine was Sniffin' Glue, produced by Mark Perry, who also founded the band Alternative TV, in 1976. Perry produced the first photocopied issue of Sniffin' Glue in London after attending the Ramones concert on 4 July 1976 at the Roundhouse. Punk zines were produced in many European countries in subsequent years. The first Irish one was published in March 1977.

In Australia in 1977, inspired by the Saints and Radio Birdman, Bruce Milne and Clinton Walker fused their respective first zines Plastered Press and Suicide Alley to launch Pulp; Milne later went on to invent the cassette zine with Fast Forward, in 1980. Another early publication was Self Abuse first published in Sydney in December 1977.

=== Proliferation (1980s–2000s) ===
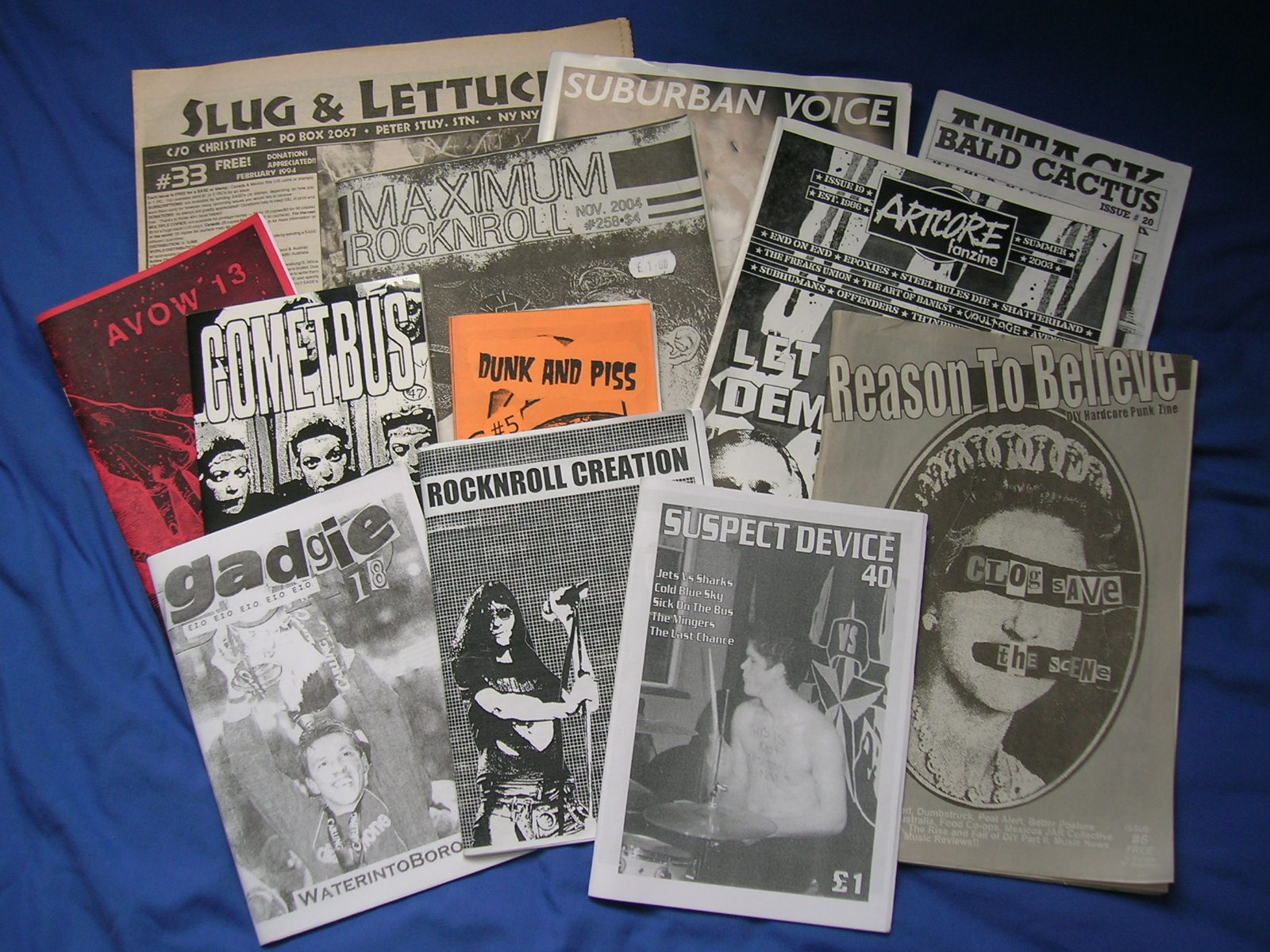
British and American punk zines, 1994–2004

The politically charged Maximum RocknRoll and the anarchist Profane Existence were notable punkzines that were founded in the 1980s. By that time, most local punk scenes had at least one punkzine. The magazine Factsheet Five chronicled thousands of underground publications and "zines" in the 1980s and 1990s.

In the 1980s, the punk self-publication scene was quickly expanding to include numerous different subcultures within the genre. For example, the birth of the Queercore movement: inspired by the desire for social change, the subculture was represented by zines that sought to accept those within the LGBT community who were also involved in punk and also had overwhelming themes of promoting individual rights. The topics discussed in the issues often ignited forums and chatrooms where readers could share their opinions. This genre of zine was self-sustaining and produced in a DIY manner. Queercore is often accredited to a Toronto-based zine entitled J.D.s, an abbreviation for "juvenile delinquents", created by H. Quinn and co-published with Bruce Wayne. H.Q.s was a cut-and-paste-style zine that featured manifestos and dialogue about identifying as queer within the realms of the punk community. Other zines that instigated this movement are Chainsaw (punk zine), Outpunk, and Homocore. The queercore zines influenced the Riot Grrrl zines of the late 1980s and 1990s, as well.

=== Riot Grrrl and other feminist zines ===
The "Riot Grrrl" movement emerged from the punk scene in the United States in the early 1990s when women began to produce zines with feminist themes. The "riot grrrl" wave was influential for pinkzines as it called for women to publish and produce content in the male dominated culture. Featuring political issues from a personal standpoint, the zines arose in popularity amongst the underground world of punk. The format of the "riot grrrl" zines was similar to that of queercore zines, in that they were cut and paste and xeroxed with many featuring collages. Self-published punkzines from this era such as Bikini Kill, Girl Germs, Le Tigre, and Jigsaw were put out by members of riot grrrl bands who supported the notion of women learning to play music and feeling self-empowered. Other apparent themes in this category of zine include activism, social change, sexuality, body image, and the discussion of controversial topics such as racism and abuse.

Making Waves was a collective fanzine focused on punk and new wave music and feminism and womanhood created by Camille Lan in Paris, France, and Mary Jane Regalado in Los Angeles. The first issue was published in 2011, and four issues were published in all. Women with an interest in punk and female post-punk from around the world, including Spain, France, Australia, the UK, and US, submitted articles and interviews for the zine. Rosa Vertov, an association founded in 2011 by Camille Lan, Alicia Eldeman, Constance Legeay, and Charlene Rihouet, focused on research about women in music, particularly within the punk and post-punk movements from the late 1970s to the early 1980s. The creators have said that they were inspired to make Making Waves by existing or earlier zines such as Brass Lip, No Class, Eccentric Sleeve Notes, and Mental Children, as well as Shocking Pink and Spare Rib. Rosa Vertov also published video mixtapes online.

== List of punk zines ==
- Absolutely Zippo
- Artcore
- Black Market Magazine
- Capitol Crisis
- Chainsaw
- Cometbus
- Damage
- Flipside
- Forced Exposure
- Gadgie
- Girl Germs
- HeartattaCk
- Homocore
- Jamming
- J.D.s
- Kill Your Pet Puppy
- Lights Go Out
- Lobotomy
- Love & Molotov Cocktails
- Matter
- Maximum RocknRoll
- New York Rocker
- Outpunk
- Ox-Fanzine
- Pork
- Profane Existence
- Punk Magazine
- Punk Planet
- Rancid News
- Rave On
- Razorcake
- RE/Search
- Ripped and Torn
- Slash
- Slug and Lettuce
- Sluggo!
- Sniffin' Glue
- Spuno
- Substitute
- Suburban Voice
- Suburban Rebels
- Take It
- TNSrecords Fanzine
- Touch and Go
- T.V.O.R.
