= DPN =

DPN may refer to:

== Science and medicine ==
- Dermatosis papulosa nigra, a skin condition
- Diabetic Peripheral Neuropathy, a diabetic neuropathy often associated with sensations of burning, shooting, and tingling
- Diarylpropionitrile, a synthetic, nonsteroidal compound
- Diphosphopyridine nucleotide, an old name for Nicotinamide adenine dinucleotide (NAD^{+}), a coenzyme found in all living cells
- Diffuse proliferative nephritis, a medical condition

== Other uses ==
- Deaf President Now, a 1988 student protest at Gallaudet University to force the university to hire a deaf president
- Democratic Party of Namibia
- Democratic Party of Nauru, a political party in the Pacific nation of Nauru
- Designated Portsmouth Number, a measure in the Portsmouth Yardstick system of handicapping for dissimilar boats in a race
- Dip-pen nanolithography, a scanning probe lithography technique
- Diseased Pariah News (1990–1999), a U.S. magazine about living with HIV and AIDS
- Double pointed needles, a type of knitting needle
