= Peroxide (disambiguation) =

Peroxides are a group of chemical compounds.

Peroxide may also refer to:

== Chemistry ==
=== Inorganic chemistry ===
- Hydrogen peroxide, the simplest peroxide
  - High-test peroxide (HTP), a highly concentrated solution of hydrogen peroxide
    - solid hydrogen peroxide
- Inorganic peroxy acids, mineral acid derivatives containing an acidic –OOH group

=== Organic chemistry ===
- Organic peroxide, organic compounds containing the peroxide functional group (ROOR')
- Organic peracids, carboxylic acid derivatives containing an acidic –OOH group

== Other ==
- Peroxide (punk zine), a 1970s magazine
- Peroxide (Nina Nesbitt album), 2014
- Peroxide blond, a variety of artificially blond hair
- "Peroxide", a song by Ecco2k on the album E (2019)
