= Ian McKay (writer) =

British writer and art critic

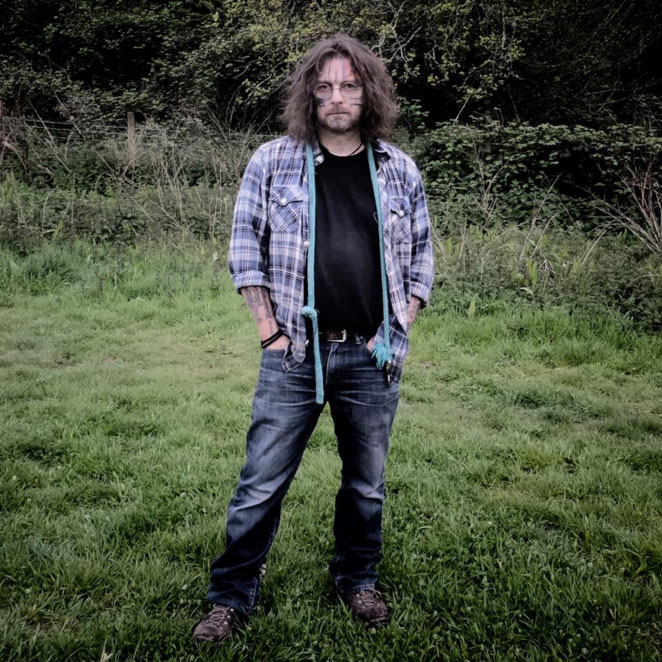
- Ian McKay in 2014
- Born: Ian Laidlaw; 22 March 1962 (age 64); Epsom, Surrey, England
- Occupations: art critic; publisher; academic

Ian McKay (born 1962) is a British writer, art critic, publisher and translator. A former editor of Contemporary Art magazine, and the founder-editor of The Journal of Geography and Urban Research, throughout the 1990s he was best known for his writings on the arts of Eastern Europe, being cited as the first British art critic to emphasize the negative impact of the western art market in that region. Throughout the 1990s and early-2000s, he was a contributor to a wide range of art journals, as well as writing on subjects relating to photography, cinema, and music. Since 2007 his publishing activities have mainly centred on UK Rural Affairs, and the environment however. Though periodically he continues to publish works of art criticism, his most recent publications concern social justice in rural Britain, as well as environmental conservation in the wider European sphere. He has also worked as an academic in several UK universities.

== Life and career ==
The son of former National Hunt jockey and racehorse trainer Geoff Laidlaw, Ian McKay was born in Epsom, Surrey, and studied at Chelsea School of Art. His first known publications were a series of punk fanzines in the late-1970s, including Peroxide (from which he was said to have been ousted by Norman Cook for serial incompetence). In the early-1980s he also was founder editor of 'The Irony of Romanticism', a short-lived alternative arts publication. In 1984, with several other writers and filmmakers, he was involved in the setting up of the organisation Music for Miners during the UK Miner's Strike of 1984–1985. He has worked as a critic and writer for art journals internationally, with his work appearing in over thirty countries worldwide. He has also curated visual art exhibitions and for some time was a senior academic in the field of Media and Cultural Studies in the UK. His recent writings largely relate to UK Rural Affairs, particularly in relation to the New Forest, as well as conservation and environmental crime in Eastern Europe and the Balkans. Occasionally he still writes on the visual arts.

== Critical writings ==
McKay began writing on both the visual arts and the environment in the 1980s, and throughout the 1990s was a regular contributor to journals and magazines that included: Apollo; Art Monthly; Arts Review; Artscribe; Computer Weekly; Contemporary Art (for which he was assistant editor); Creative Camera; The Face; Geographical Magazine; The Independent on Sunday; and Private Eye. He has also been an occasional contributor of film reviews to Sight & Sound magazine, special correspondent (Vienna) for Photoicon magazine, and is listed as correspondent for both the photography magazine f22, and State magazine. In the mid-1990s, McKay published a series of undercover reports that exposed the complex political dealings of the British Green Party's Arts Policy Working Group at that time. He also spoke regularly on a pro-censorship platform at conferences in the UK, appearing alongside figures such as the media lawyer and freedom-of-expression advocate Mark Stephens and the journalist and writer Yasmin Alibhai-Brown. During the later-1990s–2000s, he worked mainly on a series of book projects relating to the dance culture and urban youth topics, as well as becoming the founder editor of The Journal of Geography and Urban Research, In 2005, he returned to writing on the arts and culture industries for numerous magazines and as editor at large (Eastern Europe) for the British arts newspaper State of Art however, and in 2007 published a controversial series of articles that sought to expose low-level corruption and spin within the UK's independent artist-curator networks. For his research into this topic he was invited to participate in the Agendas V symposium in Venice, at the time of the 52nd Venice Biennale. He has also curated several visual art exhibitions for which he has written catalogue essays.

== Writings on East European culture ==
In the late-1980s and early-1990s, Ian McKay travelled widely throughout the former Eastern Bloc, reporting on art and culture in the post-Communist states for Artscribe, Artline International, Art Monthly, Art and Design, and The Antique Collector. During this period he was also an outspoken critic of the developing cultural scene in eastern Europe, his work being published alongside that of several prominent artists and theoreticians, including Slavoj Žižek and the Czech Fluxus artist Milan Knížák. As Carrie Dedon, Curator of Modern & Contemporary Art, Seattle Art Museum, has written, McKay was the first British critic to emphasize the negative impact of the western art market following the breakdown of communism in the east European states post-1989, arguing that this had produced a phenomenon that was detrimental not only to the quality of east European art, "but to the very possibility of forming a post-1989 national identity" in countries such as Czechoslovakia.

== Environmental and social history writings ==
In recent years, McKay has increasingly written on rural and environmental issues again. In particular, his writings on rural issues focus on social history, social justice and class issues as they pertain to environmental conservation in Britain. In 2012, he published a controversial account of his research into the recent social history of The New Forest National Park. Backgrounded by the 2011 debate about England's forestry future following the UK government's introduction of the Public Bodies Bill to The House of Lords, which would have enabled the Secretary of State to sell or lease public forests in England., he highlighted the factional infighting that emerged among several pressure groups within the New Forest itself, in turn revealing the story of a long history of social exclusion in the area which, he argued, had been engineered by the wealthy and several organisations charged with the New Forest's care. In particular, the book focussed on the plight of the New Forest Gypsies who were forcibly placed first in Forestry Commission camps, and then municipal housing during the post-war years. The New Forest: A Gated Community of the Mind was followed by Nova Foresta Zapovednik: The New Forest at Breaking Point (co-authored with the Russian environmentalist Anna Kolchevska) in which he argued in favour of a conservation approach that broadly resembled the Zapovednik system in the former Soviet Union, where assigned areas were given the highest degree of environmental protection, often being restricted to the public.

== Books ==
Ian McKay's book publications and book chapters include: Lonely is an Eyesore in Vaughan Oliver: This Rimy River (1994); On the Death of Czech Culture, in New Art from Eastern Europe (1994); Crossing the Bridge in Bridges (Daiwa Anglo Japanese Foundation) (1996), edited by Camilla Seaward; Locating the Wild Zone (2001); Mapping the Self (2002); Boyd & Evans: Looking Differently (2007), Defining Moments in Art (2008), edited by Mike Evans., and the large scale monograph Bernard Cohen: Work of Six Decades (2009), which was co-authored with the late art critic and art historian Norbert Lynton. Being fluent in several European languages, McKay has also contributed to a number of academic text books overseas. Among his most recent English language publications are the edited anthology A New Forest Reader: A Companion Guide to the New Forest, its History and Landscape (2011), which brought back into circulation several out of print texts,; The New Forest: A Gated Community of the Mind; Ahae: Through My Window (2011) which was an appraisal of the landscape photography of the Korean photographer Yu Byeong-eon(Ahae) (jointly authored with the General Director of the National Gallery in Prague, Milan Knížák), and a second monograph on the artist Bernard Cohen, in which he contests that Cohen's complex abstract works represent an "ongoing search for meaning in its broadest, most human sense."

== Academia ==
As Senior Lecturer in Media and Cultural Studies, as well as Art History, McKay has lectured and taught at several UK higher education colleges and universities, including Chelsea School of Art (1985), Surrey Institute of Art & Design (1991), Kingston University (1992–1994), and Southampton Solent University (formerly the Southampton Institute, 1994–2010). As Language Consultant he has contributed to several academic text books, including Repetytorium gimnazjalne and Slownik Nursowy: Indeks angielsko-polski (both for Cambridge University Press). He retired from academia in 2011.
