= Sluggo =

Sluggo may refer to:

== Fictional characters ==
- Sluggo or Mr. Sluggo, in the "Mr. Bill Show" short films
- Sluggo Smith, in the comic strip Nancy
- Sluggo, a Marvel Comics character in the Weapon X program

== People with the nickname ==
- Slug (rapper) (born 1972), American rapper known as Little Sluggo
- Sluggo Boyce, Canadian professional skateboarder and snowboarder
- Dave Katz (songwriter) (born 1961), American record producer and songwriter
- Sam Phipps (born 1953), American musician, member of Oingo Boingo
- Vic Ruggiero, American musical artist known as Lord Sluggo
- Don Slaught (born 1958), American baseball player

== Other uses ==
- Sluggo (route), in American football, a type of pass route
- Sluggo!, a late 1970s punk rock/new wave music fanzine
