= Freeform role-playing game =

Freeform role-playing games, also called freeforms, are a type of role-playing game which employ informal or simplified rule sets, emphasise costume and theatricality, and typically involve large numbers (eight to two hundred and fifty) of players in a common setting. Actions are typically adjudicated on the spot by a referee, though variants exist whereby players jointly mediate their own actions.

== Theatre-style LARP ==
The most common form of freeform game is the Theatre-style live action role-playing game (LARP). Such freeforms have sprung up around the world independently. Some sources suggest the genre originated in Australia where the first large-scale (100 player) freeform was played at the CanCon gaming convention in Canberra in January 1983, quickly spreading to Melbourne and later Sydney gaming conventions. Others suggest Iceland, or to games played at the University of York and popularised in the fanzine Aslan in the late nineteen eighties.

Freeforms are particularly popular in Australia, where rules-based LARP games have only become common during the last decade. Some Australian conventions run specific tournaments for small-scale freeforms that challenge the players or the normal conventions of roleplaying in ways not possible with other types of games. Such freeforms may experiment with different narrative styles, contemporary social issues or unusual themes, and can be very realistic. Such games are often restricted to mature players. "Multiform" or "systemless" styles of gaming are theatrical hybrids of traditional and freeform role-playing which may also incorporate elements of LARP. They typically emphasise theatrical expression and close emotional identification with the characters portrayed. In a multiform game, players sit at the table for social or strategic roleplaying and may even use standard tabletop rules, but will stand to act out more physical aspects of the game, often without use of formal rules sets. This style of gaming is frequently used at Australian conventions and many tabletop games employ it without being specifically labelled as multiforms, though it is not often used in home games.

== Freeform computer-assisted gaming ==
"Freeform" can also refer to online text-based role-playing games which lack rules or contain only basic guidelines, relying instead on the player's acting abilities and commitment to a good story. (In MUSH or IRC settings, these are often called consent-based, because what happens to a character is influenced by a potential "veto" from that character's player.) These systems must either rely on carefully selected individuals or strict moderation, in order to prevent less mature players from taking advantage (god-moding) of the rule-free environment, for example by unrealistically shielding their characters from the consequences of their actions.

Similarly, "freeform" can refer to online forum- and email-based role-playing games which lack rules or which lack statistics by which to judge a character's abilities. As with freeform MUSHes and IRC games those running the game rely instead upon the players' writing talents and use of description to determine outcomes – if a GM is used to control the game at all. Some online freeform games closely resemble collaborative fiction, while others have much more structured rule sets, such as the Role Player's Creed.
