= Peroxide (punk zine) =

Peroxide was a punk zine published and edited during the late 1970s by Andrew Thomas, Quentin Cook (a.k.a. Norman Cook) and Ian Laidlaw (a.k.a. Ian McKay). Inspired by punk zines such as Chainsaw, Peroxide lasted only two issues, with Laidlaw being ousted by Cook after the first issue. Importantly however, the publication is noteworthy as it served to provide Cook with his first significant point of connection with the professional music business (his contact with Adam Ant being a notable example), and for both Laidlaw and Thomas, their first experiences of publishing. Whilst Cook remained in the music business, Laidlaw (who later changed his name to McKay) became a writer on the visual arts and culture, while Thomas moved into the business sector; he currently runs Cravenhill Publishing, the publishing company behind Communicate magazine and Transform magazine.

Copies of Peroxide have latterly proved highly collectable owing largely to the connection with Norman Cook.

Peroxide-Issue1

Peroxide-Issue2
