= The "E" Ticket =

Former fanzine

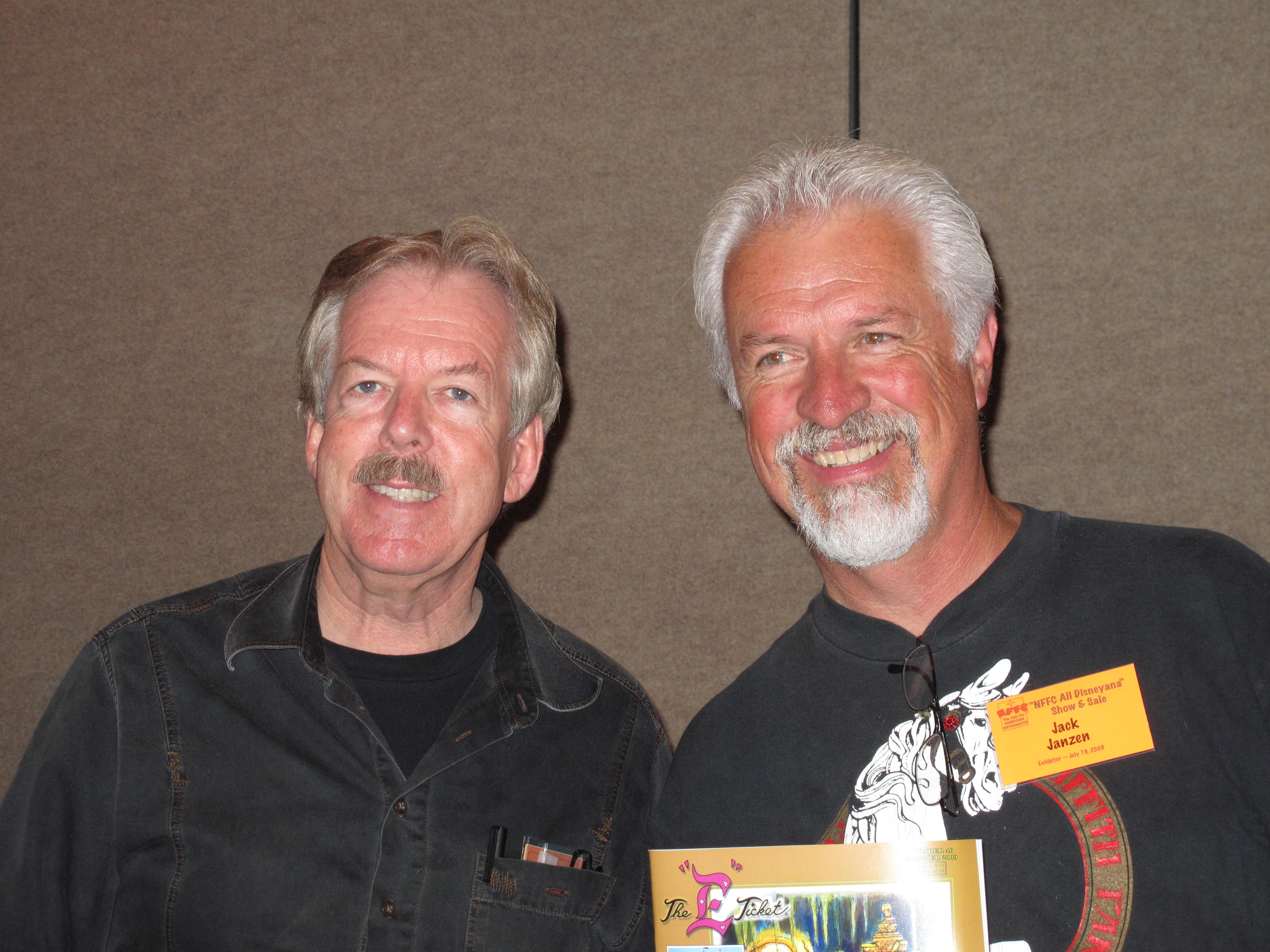
Tony Baxter and Jack Janzen in 2009 at a National Fantasy Fan Club (NFFC) event

The "E" Ticket was a fanzine devoted to the history of Disneyland and its attractions, especially the park as it existed during the lifetime of Walt Disney, publishing forty six issues between 1986 and 2009. It was edited and published by Disneyland fans Leon Janzen and Jack Janzen until Leon's sudden death on September 9, 2003. The last issue published by the brothers was the Fall 2003 Issue, #40, on Adventure Thru Inner Space. Jack continued the magazine without his brother, beginning with #41 in October 2004. In the final issue, #46 (Summer 2009), Jack noted that making the magazine "Hasn't been much fun without Leon", and he decided to end the magazine's run.

Disney and animation historian Michael Barrier has cited it as "An extremely valuable record, one that can no longer be duplicated, given the deaths of most of the interview subjects."

The magazine (including all remaining back stock) was sold in 2009 to the Walt Disney Family Foundation to augment the historic resources of The Walt Disney Family Museum it established that year. Back issues of "E" Ticket are sold at the museum's bookstore.

The magazine was named after the E tickets that, before the move to flat-rate entry tickets, denoted the top rides in the park.

== Issues ==
The following is a list of the issues of the magazine and the attraction, land, or other cover story featured:

- 1, Winter 1986 — 1955 Disneyland collectibles
- 2, Spring 1987 — Viewliner Train of Tomorrow and Knott's Berry Farm
- 3, Summer 1987 — Frontierland and Pacific Ocean Park
- 4, Winter 1987-88 — Snow White's Scary Adventures
- 5, Summer 1988 — 20,000 Leagues Under the Sea
- 6, Winter 1988-89 — Adventureland
- 7, Summer 1989 — Designing Disneyland with Marc Davis
- 8, Winter 1989-90 — Tomorrowland's Flying Saucers
- 9, Summer 1990 — Disneyland: 1959
- 10, Winter 1990-91 — Riding the Carolwood Pacific Rail Road with Walt Disney
- 11, Summer 1991 — Story Book Land
- 12, Winter 1991-92 — Monsanto's Home of the Future
- 13, Summer 1992 — Disneyland's Original Snow White Dark Ride
- 14, Winter 1992-93 — Disneyland's Main Street U.S.A.
- 15, Spring 1993 — Disneyland's Mark Twain
- 16, Summer 1993 — The Haunted Mansion
- 17, Winter 1993-94 — Tomorrowland 1967
- 18, Spring 1994 — On Disneyland's Waterways
- 19, Summer 1994 — Santa Fe and Disneyland Railroad
- 20, Winter 1994-95 — Mr. Toad's Wild Ride
- 21, Spring 1995 — Pirates of the Caribbean
- 22, Winter 1995 — Walt Disney's Carousel of Progress
- 23, Spring 1996 — Disney's Jungle Adventures
- 24, Summer 1996 — Disney's Rocket to the Moon
- 25, Winter 1996 — Mechanized Magic
- 26, Spring 1997 — Disney's Peter Pan Dark Ride
- 27, Summer 1997 — Autopia
- 28, Winter 1997 — Disneyland: The First 12 Months
- 29, Spring 1998 — The Disneyland Mine Train
- 30, Fall 1998 — Disney's Space Mountain
- 31, Spring 1999 — Alice in Wonderland
- 32, Fall 1999 — Pirates of the Caribbean
- Special — Mr. Toad's Wild Ride (updated version of #20 released at "Mr. Toad's Enchanted Evening" event at Disneyland on October 28, 1999)
- 33, Spring 2000 — Disneyland's Keel Boats
- 34, Fall 2000 — Disneyland's Submarine Voyage
- 35, Spring 2001 — Disneyland's King Arthur Carrousel
- 36, Fall 2001 — Disneyland's Monorail
- 37, Spring 2002 — Tom Sawyer Island
- 38, Fall 2002 — "It's A Small World"
- 39, Spring 2003 — The Adventureland Story
- 40, Fall 2003 — Adventure Thru Inner Space
- 41, Fall 2004 — Disneyland's Ghost House
- 42, Spring 2005 — Disneyland's Matterhorn Bobsleds
- 43, Fall 2005 — Frontierland's Pack Mules
- 44, Summer 2006 — Walt's Model Shop
- 45, Summer 2007 — The Art of the Pirates of the Caribbean
- 46, Summer 2009 — Disneyland's Indiana Jones Adventure

Also produced were three CD-ROM collections of back issues in digital format:

- CD 1: Contains issues 1–8, along with the 1988 Annual and 1991 Annual issues.
- CD 2: Contains issues 9–16.
- CD 3: Contains issues 17–24.
