= 8-Ball Community =

Artist collective based in New York City

8-Ball Community is a New York City-based artist collective that operates a zine library, online radio station, and online public-access television station.

== History ==
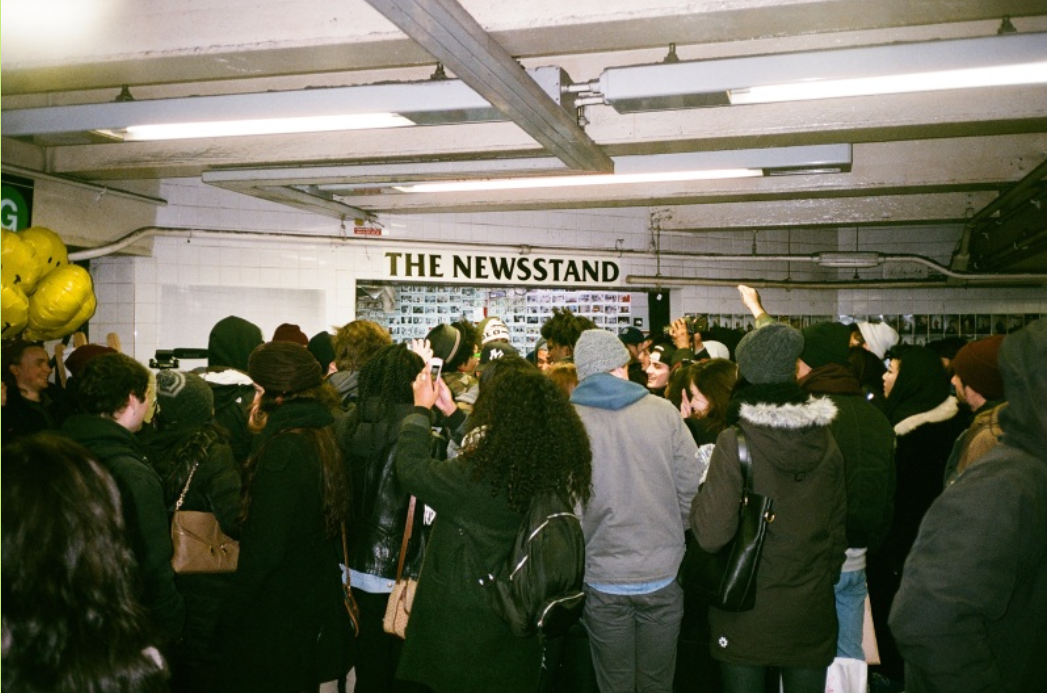
People gather for an event at 8-Ball's Newsstand.

8-Ball was formed in 2012 by a group of friends looking to help keep a billiard hall from going out of business in gentrifying East Williamsburg, Brooklyn. They hosted film screenings, readings, performances, parties, and other events at the request of Grand Billiards' owner, who wanted to attract the neighborhood's new residents to his pool hall. These events included a zine fair, in which local artists and publishers were invited to sell their wares on pool tables. Grand Billiards' landlord shut down the space in August 2012, but the friends decided to keep working together, host more events, and welcome more people into the group they decided to call "8-Ball Community."

From 2013 to 2014, 8-Ball displayed zines and hosted dozens of events at an abandoned newsstand in the Metropolitan Avenue/Lorimer Street station of the New York City Subway. The Newsstand was rebuilt in 2015 as an installation at the Museum of Modern Art, which purchased it for the permanent collection and later exhibited it in Paris at Fondation Louis-Vuitton.

The collective teamed up with tattoo artist Mark Cross to start Muddguts, an exhibition space in Williamsburg, which it helped run from 2013 to 2014. From 2014 to 2018, 8-Ball operated out of a basement in SoHo, described by The Village Voice as "a superhero's hideout — if the superhero was some mythological lovechild of Jean-Michel Basquiat and Laurie Anderson." From 2018 to 2019, 8-Ball maintained a space in a storefront on Canal Street in SoHo. In 2019, the collective was invited by the art nonprofit Creative Time to operate out of a floor of their building on the Fourth Arts Block in the East Village.

These physical spaces have served as 8-Ball's headquarters as it has grown from a team of three – Lele Saveri, Giuseppe Furcolo, and Josh Hubbard – to a collective of dozens that operates a zine library, online radio station, and online public access television station. The collective has hosted film screenings, workshops, art exhibits, artist talks, skillshares, music shows, and other events out of these spaces.

8-Ball received nonprofit status through the fiscal sponsorship of Fractured Atlas in 2016.

== Projects ==
=== Zines ===
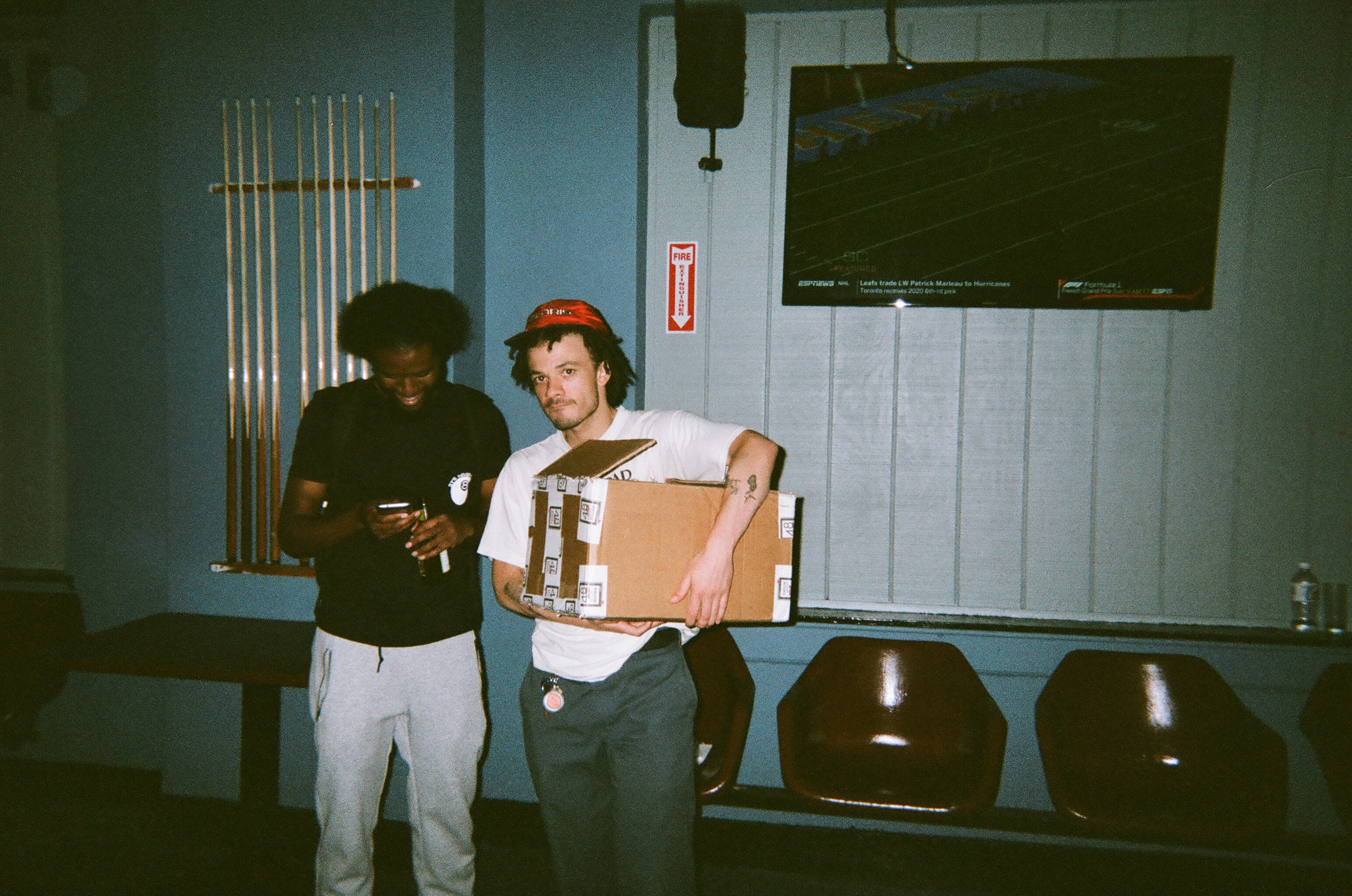
Artists pack up their wares after the 15th 8-Ball Zine Fair, at El Coqui Billiards & Lounge in Ridgewood, Queens on June 22, 2019.

8-Ball hosts two annual zine fairs in New York and one in San Francisco. All its fairs are held at billiards halls and feature a drop-off table that allows anyone with a zine to sell their work.

The collective has participated in zine fairs worldwide, including in São Paulo and Tokyo, selling zines and setting up exhibits on topics such as public-access television production and the history of American zines.

8-Ball also produces zines and other printed matter, such as calendars and flyers, internally and in collaboration with other artists and groups. 8-Ball has hosted zine-making workshops at the Whitney Museum of American Art, MoMA, and the Aperture Foundation, and collaborated with the New York art bookstore Printed Matter on events in New York and Los Angeles.

8-Ball also maintains a library of several thousand zines, chapbooks, pamphlets, and artist's books at its East Village headquarters. It has displayed the zines at MoMA, MoMA PS1, and The Studio Museum in Harlem and in Miami, Istanbul, Amsterdam, Milan, Paris, Tokyo, and San Francisco.

=== Radio ===
8-Ball launched its online radio station in 2014, when the collective was based out of the Williamsburg exhibition space Muddguts. Originally called Radio Muddguts 41, the station changed its name to 8-Ball Radio in 2015. Its shows include The Clayton Patterson Show and Dis Is A Test Radio.

8-Ball Radio frequently hosts events around New York City. In 2018, 8-Ball Radio was voted Listeners' Choice Best Online Radio Station in North America in the Mixcloud Online Radio Awards.

=== Television ===
8-Ball launched its online public access television station on January 20, 2017, playing Aldo Tambellini's piece "Inauguration '81" while Donald Trump was getting sworn in as president. 8-Ball described the station as a "free platform for, of, and by the people" with "no censorship, no prejudice, no hierarchy, no advertisements, no limits."

8-Ball TV's content includes original series, submitted videos, and footage of interviews and protests. The station has aired Angela Davis' 1972 interview from California State Prison, footage of protests in New York and Standing Rock, a video countdown show called MTV 12, interviews with East Village residents, short films by Look at my Black Beauty (LAMBB), Hello Kitty's Alice in Wonderland, "cam-girl pseudo-porn and a video that shows how to skin a whole hog." According to amNY, "the only thing 8-Ball [TV] won't allow is branded or commercial content." TANK Magazine likened the station's programming to the 1970s downtown New York television show TV Party, "known for its decadent raucousness as much as its dissident outlook."

8-Ball TV has exhibited in Milan, São Paulo, and Tokyo.

=== Other ===
8-Ball also produces merchandise, engages in social activism, and hosts educational workshops and opportunities for youth.

8-Ball's activist work includes co-sponsoring the New York Kurdish Film and Cultural Festival. The collective airs protest footage and programs devoted to advancing social movements on 8-Ball TV and produces an activism zine called the Affinity Journal.

In 2019, 8-Ball launched a mentorship program for emerging artists in memory of Jim Walrod, a New York designer, Fiorucci art director, and "downtown legend" who died in 2017. "Jim's Web" paired established artists such as Paper Magazine co-founder Kim Hastreiter with newer artists, who were given $3,000 to complete a project in four months. The projects were displayed in November 2019 at 8-Ball's space in the East Village.

In 2020, 8-Ball hosted a series of online educational workshops during the COVID-19 pandemic. The collective also partnered with artists including Tauba Auerbach, Daniel Arnold, and Kim Gordon to release a line of T-shirts for its eighth anniversary.

== Philosophy ==
8-Ball co-founder Lele Saveri started the collective in part to create a "welcoming place" within the New York art world. A 2017 Vice Media article describes the collective's ethos as "explicitly inclusive" and "free of censorship, gatekeepers, and commercial interests."

In a 2019 interview with Love Injection Fanzine, Saveri describes his motivations for forming 8-Ball:

When I moved [to New York] in 2010, it felt like the crowd, the scene, or whatever you wanted to call it – not underground because it's not underground – but the downtown arts scene, was somewhat welcoming, but I really had the general feeling of people wondering, 'Who [is] this new person?' ... I was very put off by it, and I felt like that's why I wanted something that was not about being cool.

The collective is run by volunteers in a non-hierarchical fashion. A 2018 Village Voice article defines 8-Ball's ideals as "everyone is welcome," "we have no elitism," and "we do not have any association with brands."

== See also ==
- DIY ethic
- Alternative culture
- Underground culture
