= Matter (music magazine) =

Chicago music magazine Matter, 1983-1986

Matter #2, Feb./Mar. 1983

Matter was a Chicago "music magazine" (or more appropriately a punk zine) founded in January 1983. It published 15 issues, one every two to five months, through June 1986. Each issue had from 16 to 40 pages, printed on 8-1/2" x 11" heavy, semi-gloss paper, in black and white. Starting with issue 4, the cover had one additional color, always on the front, sometimes on the back advertisement. The entire publication contained about 1000 pieces of editorial content.

The editor and publisher of all 15 issues was Elizabeth Phillip. Contributors included Steve Albini, Ira Kaplan, Jim DeRogatis, and Glen Sarvady. Originally out of Evanston, Illinois, the magazine moved to Hoboken, New Jersey with issue #10, Sep/Oct. 1984. Until the last issue, the magazine dispensed with page numbers, and none had tables of contents. The focus of the magazine was on current Chicago area, Midwestern, North American, and British music and art that was not in the mainstream.

In his 2003 book Milk It!, Chicago music critic DeRogatis called Matter an "influential" magazine. Blatch fanzine said "Ultra-pro printing makes Matter stand out like a sore thumb amid the hoards of mags with sloppy, thrown-down layout. .. [It also has] intelligent, multi-opinioned record reviews." Journalist Greg Kot, in his book Ripped: How the Wired Generation Revolutionized Music, wrote that "[f]anzines like .. Matter .. helped introduce a generation to music that wasn't heard on radio, seen on MTV, or written about in Rolling Stone". OP magazine called it a "slick new mag" covering local and regional artists. Musician Bob Mould mentions Matter in his autobiography See a Little Light.
