= Music for Miners =

UK Art Collective

Music for Miners (MFM) was a collective of UK writers, artists and filmmakers (including several independent television producers associated with RPM Productions and Channel 4) who attempted to engage young people with politics during the UK miners' strike of 1984–1985. Members of the collective included the television producer Don Coutts and the writer and artist Ian McKay. Music for Miners organised several events to raise funds and support striking miners, the most notable of which was the MFM event held at the Royal Festival Hall in London on 14 May 1984. The English rock group New Order headlined the event with John Cooper Clarke supporting. New Order's setlist for the event began with a debut live performance of 'Face Up' and included 'Everything's Gone Green'; 'Temptation'; 'Confusion'; 'Your Silent Face'; 'Leave Me Alone'; and 'Hurt'. Music for Miners was disbanded soon after the end of the strike in March 1985.
