= The Comet (fanzine) =

American science fiction fanzine

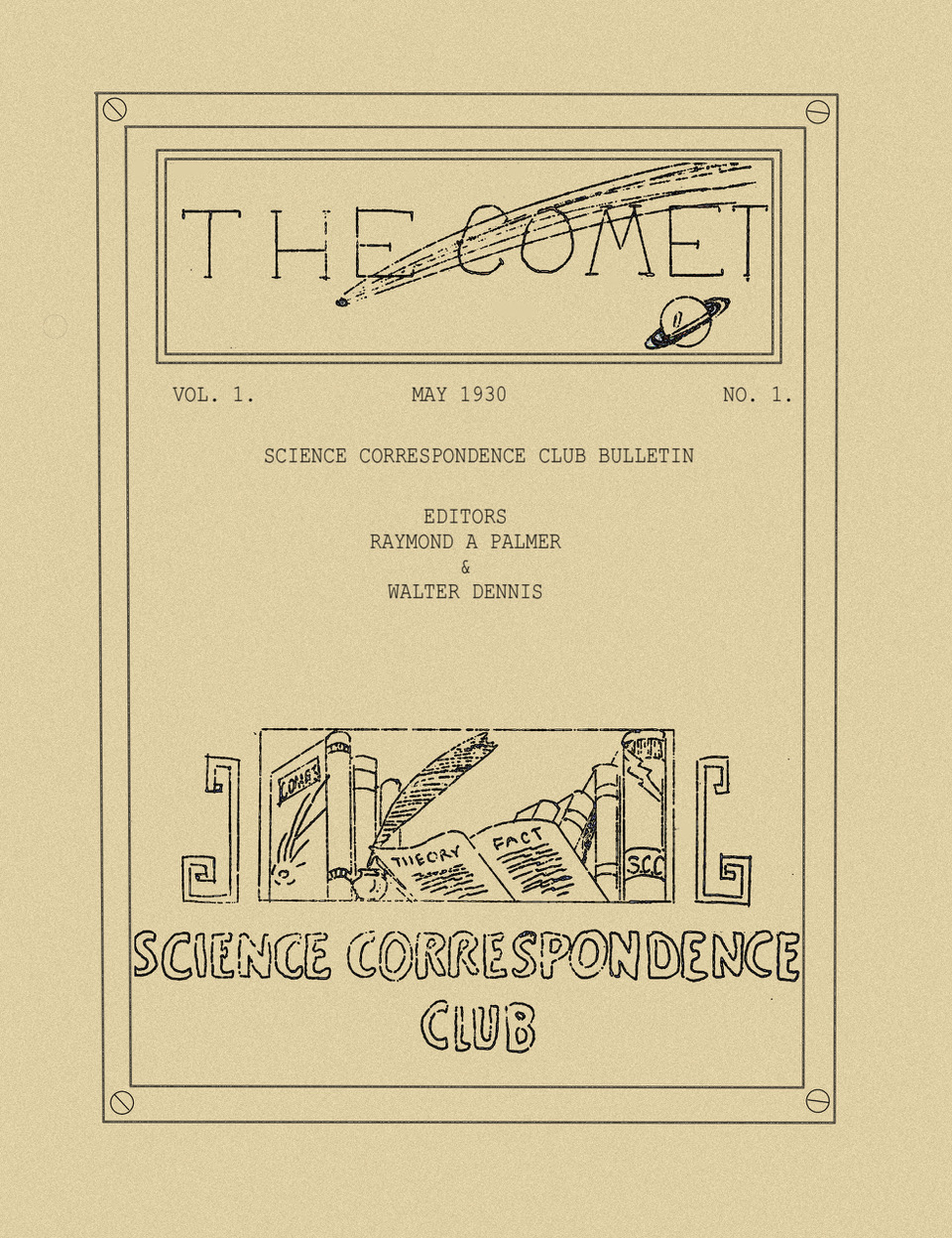
- The cover of the first issue from May 1930
- Categories: Science fiction fanzine
- First issue: May 1930
- Final issue: 1933
- Company: Science Correspondence Club
- Country: United States
- Based in: Chicago, Illinois
- Language: English

The Comet, later known as "?" and Cosmology, was an American science fiction fanzine released between 1930 and 1933. It consisted of seventeen issues, with each gradually shifting focus from science to science fiction.

== History ==
The publication was an effort of the Science Correspondence Club's Chicago chapter. Its original editors were Raymond A. Palmer and Walter Dennis and the first issue, titled The Comet, was published in May 1930. The first issue's main goal was to spread the knowledge of science and encourage invention.

Its second issue, dated July 1930, was titled "?" and was the first issue to directly reference science fiction. The third issue, dated August 1930, took on its third title, Cosmology. The fanzine retained this name for the remainder of its publication.

Eventually, the organization changed its name as well: in May 1931, the Science Correspondence Club became the International Scientific Association.

After their steady publishing schedule began to falter, Palmer turned over editing duties to Aubrey MacDermott and Clifton Amsbury in 1932. MacDermott mentions the publication briefly in his autobiographical essay Recollections on the Origins of Science Fiction Fandom: 1917 to 1948. He credits himself and Amsbury for publishing and paying for some issues of Cosmology up until the 15th issue.

Publication ended in 1933 with the 17th issue. Aside from the final issue, all issues were mimeographed.

== Legacy ==
The Comet is often cited as both the first science fiction fanzine and the first fanzine in general. It earned the distinction of "the first of the fan magazines" as early as 1935, five years before the term "fanzine" was coined.

However, there is some debate. Science fiction historian Sam Moskowitz describes The Planet, first published in July 1930, two months after The Comet, as the first fan magazine to focus on science fiction rather than science. The authors of Fancyclopedia 3 argue The Planet is the first fanzine for this reason. Editor Luis Ortiz also cites The Planet, as well as The Time Traveller, as contenders for first fanzine.

Moskowitz described The Comet as having a "multiplier effect" by modeling how other science fiction groups could attract members, leading other groups to form and launch their own fan magazines.
