= ENZK =

Scottish punk fanzine

ENZK was a punk and hardcore fanzine from Scotland.

It was written by Graham Enzk and the first issue was published in 1989. It was originally laid out using a mixture of type and handwriting within the traditional punk cut and paste style, later moving toward a cleaner DTP style. It was initially printed by the UK punk scene's most prolific and cheapest printing service, Bobprint, and sold for slightly less than the actual cost of printing them. Later issues were printed by Urban Print in Dundee.

ENZK was erratic in its output, with often several years between some issues. The paper version of the zine became too expensive to print and number 8 and 9 were just review sheets. Issue 10 saw a return to a full zine.

Around 1998 the zine also made the jump to the web, again on a DIY low cost basis on free hosting Angelfire. The website contained many reviews and interviews from the out of print paper versions and also a large section of photos of punk and hardcore bands playing live. The photography gradually became the focus of the website.
