= Rancid Hell Spawn =

English punk rock band

Rancid Hell Spawn are an English punk rock band, originally active between 1988 and 1995, making a return in 2011.

Based in London, England, the band released five albums and six extended plays. Rancid Hell Spawn also provided two songs for the soundtrack of Dennis Worden's Stickboy music video in 1993. Their music is characterized by short and catchy songs with bizarre song titles, with a distinctive noisy and distorted sound, featuring a Casio organ and large amounts of feedback. The majority of Rancid Hell Spawn songs are short, high-speed punk burnouts with melodies hidden beneath the feedback. Steven Wells of New Musical Express described it as "listening to Eddie Cochran while wearing a chemical warfare suit full of angry wasps." Rancid Hell Spawn’s record sleeve artwork has consistently comprised simple, but sick and striking graphics.

The band was fronted by Charlie Chainsaw, former editor of Chainsaw fanzine which started in 1977 and continued until 1984. Rancid Hell Spawn were DIY pioneers – all of the early releases were recorded on a cheap 4-track portastudio in Charlie’s front room; the only time that a professional recording studio was used was when the recordings were mixed on to reel-to-reel tape before being sent to the pressing plant. The unorthodox instrumentation, which often included three bass guitar tracks, together with the low-budget recording techniques, gave Rancid Hell Spawn a unique sound; and the cheap recording costs enabled the band to record and release a large number of songs in a relatively short space of time.

Charlie Chainsaw remains active in the London punk scene, running the Wrench Records record label and mailorder company.

Rancid Hell Spawn reformed in 2011, releasing an EP Abolition of the Orgasm in December 2011 and Eat My Cigarette in 2016.

== Discography ==
- Festering Pus single, Wrench Records, 1988
- Jumpin Jack Flesh LP, Wrench Records, 1989
- Gas Mask Love mini-LP, Wrench Records, 1990
- Chainsaw Masochist LP, Wrench Records, 1990
- Split EP with The Fells, Toxic Shock Records, 1991
- Gastro Boy EP, Wrench Records, 1992
- Axe Hero CD, Wrench Records, 1993
- Teenage Lard EP, Wrench Records, 1995
- Scalpel Party Retrospective CD, Wrench Records, 2000
- Abolition of the Orgasm EP, Wrench Records, 2011
- Eat My Cigarette EP, Wrench Records, 2016
