= Foul (fanzine) =

Foul was a British football fanzine first published in October 1972 by students at the University of Cambridge. It was inspired by Private Eye and has been described as one of the first recognisable football fanzines. Thirty-four issues were published between 1972 and 1976. One of its writers was Chris Lightbown. Stan Hey, Steve Tongue and Andrew Nickolds were also regular contributors. "Vince of the Villa", a strip cartoon, was composed and illustrated by Lee Porter.

It appeared during a period when fanzines on music, politics, and other subjects were being used as alternatives to mainstream media. Nearly a decade after ''Foul'' ceased publication, a new wave of football fanzines appeared after the Heysel and Bradford disasters. Many, including 'When Saturday Comes', were inspired by Foul.
