= Damage (punk zine) =

San Francisco punk zine, 1979–1981

Damage #1, July 1979

Damage - officially Damage: An Inventory - was a punk fanzine from San Francisco, California. There were 13 issues, from July 1979 to June 1981, appearing roughly every two months. It was printed on 11-1/2 x 17-3/4″ newsprint. Issues were generally 36 to 48 pages long. Its editor was Brad Lapin. Contributors included Jello Biafra, Ginger Coyote, Geza X, and f-stop Fitzgerald. Two of the issues were 28- and 32-page free guides to the Western Front music and art festival in San Francisco for 1979 and 1980.

Damage covered the punk scene in Northern and Southern California, as well as international developments. OP magazine called it "one of the best new wave publications". Reporting on the local scene in the San Francisco Examiner, Bill Mandel said that Damage was "the punk Bible" [for the Bay Area, presumably]. Archivist Ryan Richardson called it “a definite contender in a state crowded with fanzine heavyweights.” Nicholas Rombes used Damage as a source for nine entries in his A Cultural Dictionary of Punk. Writer Stevie Chick included a lengthy quote from a Damage article by Jeffrey Bale to describe Black Flag's increasing popularity in his book about the band.
