= Aslan (fanzine) =

Magazine

Aslan was a British role-playing game fanzine that was published in Brighton and subsequently York in the late 1980s and early 1990s. It ran for 13 issues and many of them had sub-zines included. The title refers to both a character in The Chronicles of Narnia and a humanoid alien species in the Traveller role-playing game. The fanzine grew out of a long-running fantasy role-playing game which took place at the University of Sussex. The editor and publisher was Andrew Rilstone, who was initially assisted by Martin Wykes.

Aslan became known for its RPG theory, philosophy, speculation and commentary. It took a stance opposed to much of the role-playing games industry of the day, which at the time was concentrating on expanding into the children's games market. As a reaction against the use of heavily pre-plotted scenarios in many commercial game products Aslan promoted the concept of player-centred narrative. This allowed the actions of the players to determine the course of the narrative rather than requiring the story to follow a predetermined plot. Thus it foreshadowed modern sandbox RPGs.

The magazine has been credited with popularising freeform role-playing games in the UK.

Rilstone later went on to edit Interactive Fantasy, a journal published by Hogshead Publishing that took his RPG ideas further. Interactive Fantasy ran for four issues in 1994–95; the first issue was titled Inter*action but this was changed for subsequent issues because of trademark difficulties.
