= Japanese Giants =

Japanese fanzine (1974–2004)

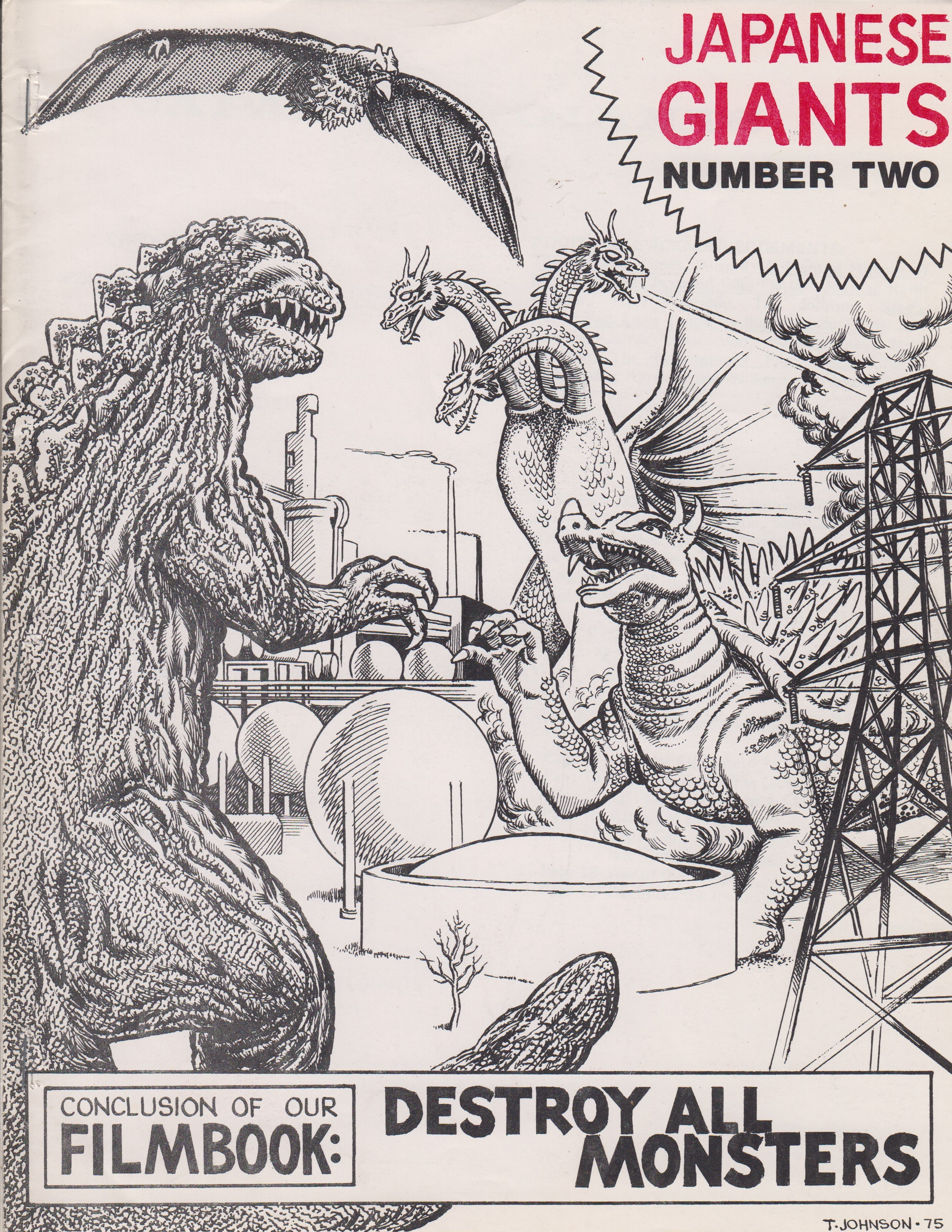
Issue 2 cover

Japanese Giants was a kaiju (giant monster) fanzine with an emphasis on Japanese monsters, such as Godzilla. The first issue was published in 1974 by Stephen Mark Rainey and publication continued under different editors until 2004.

== History ==
Japanese Giants was inspired by the fanzine Japanese Fantasy Film Journal (JFFJ), edited and published by Greg Shoemaker. Shoemaker has been credited with founding American Godzilla fandom. Japanese Giants was the second fanzine to be published on the genre. Fifteen year-old Stephen Mark Rainey published the first issue of Japanese Giants in 1974. Rainey was also the editor. Offset printed, the 18 page issue revolved around the first half of a filmbook of Destroy All Monsters. Other articles included Ultraman, Johnny Sokko and his Flying Robot by Tom Murdock, as well photos and art by Rainey, Chuck Neely, and Robert Cox.

Japanese Giants issue one was a clear expression of Rainey's love of the genre, but was not financially successful. Bradford Grant Boyle took over the fanzine with issue two. Also 15, he had previously published other fanzines including Sci-Fi. Issue two had a more professional look but still obviously a fanzine. The cover was two-color offset on glossy paper, with Destroy All Monsters drawn by Tim Johnson. Boyle printed issue two at his East High School graphics class. A fanzine budget was often very small and bootstrapping was a necessity. The contents included the conclusion of the Destroy All Monsters filmbook by Stephen Mark Rainey, "The Day of Daiei" by Tony Picariello, "Kappa: Terror from the Deep" by Stephen Mark Rainey, and an Aurora Ghidrah Model review by Bradford G. Boyle. Like Rainey, Boyle took a financial bath until Famous Monsters of Filmland mentioned Japanese Giants in an issue.

Japanese Giants issue 3 had a cover by Bill Gudmundson. Contents included film news, monster sizes by Bill Gudmundson, part one of the Mothra filmbook, by Tony Picariello, "Godzillla! Coincidence or Allegory" by Peter H. Brothers. The issue was 32 pages, offset printed.

Issue four featured a cover of Mothra by Tim Johnson. The interior of the issue was printed with a Xerox machine. Published in September, 1977, the issue was 34 pages. Contents included an Editorial by Brad Boyle, readers' letters, monster footprint chart by Bill Gudmundson, Rodan model review by Peter H. Brothers, Yusha Raideen, an analysis of the cartoon series by Dan Briggs, Ultra 7 by Diego Agbayani, Godzilla vs. Megalon / Bionic Monster by Stephen Mark Rainey, reviews of the Marvel Godzilla comic issues #1–3, and the conclusion of the Mothra filmbook by Dan Murray.

The fanzine ceased publication in 2004 with its tenth issue, marking thirty years since Rainey's efforts. Godziszewski carried his passion into writing multiple books, and contributing to several Classic Media movies' commentary. Because of the age and limited print runs, early issues are rare. The University of Iowa has issue four in their collection.
