= Artcore Fanzine =

American punk music zine

Artcore Fanzine is a punk zine first published in January 1986, covering punk and hardcore music based out of the United Kingdom between 1986 and 2018 before relocating to the US.

It is published once or twice a year and as well as interviews of new bands, labels and artists. It is also known for the other half of the magazine called Vaultage which covers bands, labels, artists, authors and photographers from throughout the history of this style of music. There have been 42 issues of Artcore published as of 2024, and at least 20 vinyl/CD and cassette releases.

Artcore is edited by "Welly", singer for Four Letter Word, State Funeral and Violent Arrest, graphic designer, and previously roadie for Chaos UK.

Welly Artcore is the author of the books Directions to the Outskirts of Town and Nefarious Artists.
