= Last Hours =

British anti-authoritarian publishing collective

- Formation: 2003
- Type: Decentralized collective
- Purpose: "Last Hours is a publishing collective for the anti-authoritarian, DIY and punk communities."
- Headquarters: London, United Kingdom
- Website: www.lasthours.org.uk

Last Hours (known as Rancid News prior to 2005) is an anti-authoritarian publishing collective. From 2003 to 2008 it produced a fanzine, initially called Rancid News until issue 9, changing its name to Last Hours from issue 10 till the final issue, 17, in May 2008. All 17 issues were edited by Edd Baldry before he stood down as editor. Since 2008 Last Hours has become a publishing collective, launching a website, and releasing two books in the autumn of 2009, Excessive Force and Diary of a miscreant.

== Rancid News ==
At its inception Rancid News was a punk zine, which began circulation in April 2003 with interviews from AFI, One Minute Silence, and Johnny Truant, alongside articles, columns and reviews. Rancid News was initially launched at a time when the Fracture and Reason To Believe zines were still in existence. After those publications ceased, Rancid News assumed their mantel documenting the UK punk scene. A key difference between Rancid News and the aforementioned zines is that Rancid News was sold outside gigs, and in record and comic stores rather than being available free. It was compared to San Francisco-based Maximum RocknRoll, due largely to similar political beliefs and style of music covered.

Rancid News was often connected with the Household Name records scene, featuring most of the label's bands between 2003 and 2005. Rancid News was also distributed by many of the Household Name Records bands, including Five Knuckle, Captain Everything!, Adequate Seven, Howards Alias, and Antimaniax amongst others. At its height Rancid News distributed around 4,000 copies around the UK and Europe. The zine was printed on newsprint and most issues were 116 pages long, with a colour cover, and saddle stitch binding.

In early 2005 the name Rancid News was considered a hindrance. People mistakenly assumed the fanzine had something to do with the punk rock band Rancid and it was felt that it forced contributors to focus too heavily on music. The final issue of Rancid News, published in February 2005, gave an indication of the changing direction, with a greater emphasis on radical culture in general and with particular focus on political articles, vegan recipes and longer columns.

The name Last Hours was agreed on in a meeting in March 2005, with the first issue - issue 10 - of the fanzine being released in June 2005, with subsequent issues to be released every six months. It maintained a balance between interviews with punk bands and political articles. It was published under the strapline 'Radical culture and punk rock'.

The print production remained the same as Rancid News until issue 13, when the fanzine again changed direction with the first perfect bound edition, and an issue dedication to 'Punk rock and comics'. It marked the first time that interviews, articles or reviews relating to punk rock took up less than 50% of the fanzine.

After issue 13 each issue of Last Hours was themed in one way or another, most often around the principle article of the zine. So, issue 14 focussed on acoustic punk rock, issue 15 on anarcho-punk compilations, issue 16 on DIY punk rock houseshows, and issue 17 on radical illustration. In all of the issues of Last Hours anarchist politics and radical culture took prominence over the music.

== Last Hours live ==
Last Hours regularly put on gigs in London under the monicker Last Hours live. During 2006 these were most often at The Square, a squatted social centre in Russel Square, where Last Hours put on, amongst others, The Steal, Ghost Mice, Attack Vipers and The King Blues. During 2007 Last Hours continued to put on gigs in squatted social centres around London, including The Vortex, in Stoke Newington, and The New Camberwell Social centre off Camberwell New Road, Kennington. In late 2007 Last Hours live started putting on gigs at the Cross Kings, Kings Cross, to launch Last Hours issue 16, and for the first five months of 2008 had monthly gigs at the venue, including one of Fall of Efrafa's few London shows.

In addition to putting on gigs members of the Last Hours/ Rancid News collective have been involved in a number of squatted social centres, for example in 2003 with involvement in the Blackstar collective, 2004 with the In Arms Reach collective, which squatted a building off London's Oxford Street for a two-week punk festival, and 2005 at the Institute for Autonomy on Gower Street, London.

== London Zine Symposium ==
In 2005 two members of the Rancid News collective established the London Zine Symposium, which for the first year was held in the Institute for Autonomy. It has become an annual event, and in 2009 had over 1,000 attendees with talks given by Roger Sabin, Teal Triggs, Barcelona Zine Library, and Alex Wrekk from Portland, United States. Up until 2010 the event had been organised by members of the Rancid News or Last Hours collective.

== Hiatus ==
After issue 17 Last Hours was placed on a brief hiatus as Edd Baldry stepped down as editor of the publication. Other members of the collective pushed for the publication to be migrated to the internet, and a regular resource for the anti-authoritarian and punk communities in the UK. The website was relaunched in early 2009 and long articles written about the protests against the attack on Gaza, photo essays about the G20, and responses to Ian Tomlinson's death. It also started publishing a podcast and offering regular vegan recipes.

== "Creative resistance" ==
During 2009 Last Hours changed its strapline from 'Radical culture and punk rock' to 'Creative resistance', indicating a greater focus on radical politics and a move away from punk culture. In the autumn of 2009 Last Hours released its first two books. 'Excessive Force' was a 150-page comic's anthology against the police, with the subtitle, 'Police everywhere, justice nowhere'. It featured artwork from 17 international illustrators about abuses of power by the police. It was a benefit for FitWatch and LDMG, two organisations working to curtail police abuses. Excessive Force was the first of what will become a regular comix anthology being produced by Last Hours. At the same time the collective was working on 'Diary of a miscreant', a book collecting ten years of the comic zine Morgenmuffel, by Isy Morgenmuffel. It offered a document on the anti-globalisation movement through the prism of an anarcha-feminist, vegan who was heavily involved in the manifestations during that period.

Last Hours, in 2010, aims to publish books about the London Zine Symposium, the squatting movement in the UK and a series of posters offering alternative perspectives on subjects such as anarchy, prisons and the general election. It will also be creating a film about the UK small-press and fanzine community.
