= Daniel Arnold (photographer) =

American photographer

Daniel Arnold is a street and fashion photographer based in New York City.

== Work ==
Arnold initially distributed his work on Instagram and gained visibility through a viral 2012 Gawker article, in which he was described as "the best photographer on Instagram". Arnold was banned from the service but later returned with a new account, accruing over 60,000 followers by 2014. That same year, Arnold was referred to as "the William Eggleston of Instagram" and "Instagram's ultimate street photographer" in The New York Times and Wired, respectively. Additionally, Arnold was given control of The New Yorker's Instagram account for one week, during which he documented activity on New York City subways.

Beginning in 2015, Vogue commissioned Arnold to photograph the annual Met Gala, where he applied his candid street style to the red carpet to produce off-the-cuff portraits of attendees. In 2016, he covered both the Republican and Democratic National Conventions. In 2017, his work was featured in the documentary Daniel Arnold's New York, as well as in Vogue, which featured his photographic examinations of life in the Midwest. The following year, he covered the Women's March for Vogue.

Following the death of The New York Times photographer Bill Cunningham in 2016, Arnold began contributing open-ended street assignments to the paper. His photography has since appeared regularly in The New York Times, Vogue, and Interview. Arnold has had solo exhibitions at Larrie, New York (2019), and New York Life Gallery (2023).

Arnold has published three books of his work: Locals (2013), with photographs of New York commuters; Pickpocket (2021); and You Are What You Do (2025). You Are What You Do, Arnold's second monograph, draws from approximately 3,000 images spanning two decades of his work and was edited by Sarah Chaplin Espenon. Reviewers noted a shift in tone from his earlier work, with Lampoon describing the book as showing "a gentler, less irreverent touch" following a period of personal loss, and Aperture situating the monograph within a three-year span in which Arnold had lost several family members. Creative Review characterized the book as an "extended visual diary" of his intuitive working method.

== Publications ==
- Locals (2013)
- Pickpocket. Elara, 2021. With an afterword by Josh Safdie
- You Are What You Do. Loose Joints, 2025. ISBN 978-1-912719-70-9.
