= Denim delinquent =

Canadian fanzine (1971–1976)

- denim delinquent No. 5
- Editor: Jymn Parrett
- Categories: Music Magazine
- Frequency: Annual
- First issue: 1971
- Final issue: 1976
- Country: Ottawa, Ontario, Canada; Los Angeles, USA
- Language: English

Denim Delinquent was an underground fanzine of seven issues in total, published from 1971 to 1976. It was the first rock and roll fanzine to come out of Canada. The zine began as a launching pad for the writing of Jymn Parrett and Mark Jones in Ottawa, Ontario.

After the first two Ottawa-based issues, subsequent Denim Delinquents were published out of Los Angeles by Jymn and Dee Parrett. The content of these issues included articles about music groups playing the Sunset Strip, including the Whisky a Go Go.

Contributors included Lester Bangs, Jeremy Gluck (later of The Barracudas), Danny Sugerman, Jeffrey Morgan AKA Machine Rock (Creem). Interviews and features spanned such groups as:

- Iggy and the Stooges
- Kiss
- Kinks
- New York Dolls
- Mott the Hoople
- Michael Nesmith
- Monty Python

For many years after the demise of Denim Delinquent, Jymn Parrett continued to write for various Canadian music magazines, including Cheap Thrills, Stagelife, Roxy and more recently, "Ugly Things."

A compendium of Denim Delinquent issues was published by the book division of HoZac Records, May 2016. It was sold out in one week. A second edition sold out as well.

== In media ==
- The cover of the fifth issue later became the artwork for Bomp Records' release, Wild Love by Iggy and the Stooges .
- Jymn Parrett contributed liner notes to California Bleeding, an Iggy and the Stooges CD for Bomp.
- In the late nineties, Denim Delinquent became the subject of articles in fanzines Black to Comm and Back of a Car.
- Morrissey etched the quote, "WHAT KIND OF MAN READS DENIM DELINQUENT?" into the run out groove of his Interesting Drug 12 inch single. This quote is a reference to the back cover of issue number 3, specifically to the New York Dolls, who appear on the front cover of the same issue.
- In 2007, a biography of Iggy Pop titled Open Up and Bleed included several quotes by Parrett and references to Denim Delinquent's coverage of the Stooges during 1974.
