= Spuno =

Cover of the third issue.

Spuno was a punk fanzine, bizarrely subtitled Dressing Gown News after a song by local band Identity Crisis, based in Bath, UK. Edited and produced by Mark Price (AKA Eric Normal) & Marcus Pennington, it ran to 3 issues in 1980. The Spuno logo was the music magazine Sounds logo upside down.

The zine was largely made up of reviews of national and local bands, including live performances at Bath Pavilion and Bristol Trinity by bands such as Toyah, Animals And Men, Crass, Poison Girls, Identity Crisis, Au Pairs, Essential Logic, John Cooper Clarke, The Pop Group, The Slits, The Raincoats, Adam & The Ants, The Undertones, The Moondogs, Dolly Mixture, Warheads, Smegma, UK Subs, The Beat, Electric Guitars, and Echo & The Bunnymen. Other reviews included The Great Rock 'n' Roll Swindle. Cartoons by Eric Normal.

Spuno promoted a number of concerts by punk bands in Bath, sometimes in conjunction with local rock photographer Adrian Tripod (Real name: Andrew J Davis). The promoters variously called themselves: Spuno, Spuno Tripod, and House Of Wax.

Bath has always been a delightful tourist city yet Spuno in its guises as a fanzine and concert promoter managed for a period of a few years to provide an alternative scene for the, then, young people of the city. In recent years at least one of the promoters, Mark, has lamented the lack of a similar culture for the youth of the city today, http://www.bathchronicle.co.uk/Identity-Crisis-Youth-LetDown/story.html

== Spin Offs ==
Cartoonist Eric Normal produced two issues of his own fanzine. Limited to 20 copies each. Distribution was managed so nobody could own both copies (although there one or possibly two close friends who did!).
