= Sean Aaberg =

American artist and magazine editor

- Born: Sean Peter Aaberg; June 7, 1976 (age 50); Oakland, California
- Known for: Artist and magazine editor
- Movement: Kustom Kulture, punk rock

Sean Aaberg (born June 7, 1976) is an American comics artist, conceptual artist, illustrator and magazine editor active in the punk rock, heavy metal and Kustom Kulture scenes. He is known as a co-founder of Nonchalance and Oaklandish. He was the editor and publisher of PORK. PORK's self-description is "rock&roll, weirdo art, bad ideas. Real American cool culture. Uncompromising. Upbeat. Free. Quarterly. Not suitable for squares".

== Early life ==
Sean Aaberg was born in Oakland, California. He is the son of Philip Aaberg and LouAnn Lucke. He grew up in Oakland, attending Bishop O'Dowd High School and briefly attending the California College of the Arts. As a kid, he liked "anything weird, nasty and old", including cheap magazines which he bought thousands of, as he said in an interview. His friends and he read Mad, drew comics, liked to listen to Cheech and Chong and the Ramones on the Dr. Demento show, and later discovered the Church of the Subgenius. He admired the movies of Ralph Bakshi. The interviewer noted that Aaberg writes in ALL CAPS. Sean founded and played drums for Eugene-based Rock and roll band The Latrines and for the Oakland-based hardcore punk band The Masked Men. He also played drums for Baltimore-based anarcho punk band A//Political.

== Career ==
Aaberg came up in the international DIY Punk scene in the 90s doing zines and art for Punk zines such as Slug and Lettuce. Aaberg has created illustrations and comics for Bitch, Roctober, Kitchen Sink magazine, BANG! newspaper, and VICE magazine. Aaberg is mostly known for his Weirdo Art following in the foot-steps of Ed "Big Daddy" Roth, Basil Wolverton and Robert Crumb. Sean has been noted for his ability to change styles and use different design languages in order to keep things lively. Such comic artists as Tim Goodyear have been published in PORK.

PORK#9 cover by Sean Aaberg (November, 2012)

Aaberg is the designer and artist, with Eric Radey, of Dungeon Degenerates: Hand of Doom, a cooperative fantasy boardgame with a punk metal esthetic

He is married to artist and photographer Katie Aaberg, who collaborates with her husband on PORK. She told an interviewer for Tension Magazine that people do not always understand their sense of humor and that they frequently receive hate mail from "activists" who lecture them on appropriate behavior, but "cultural ownership" is against their artistic vision. The Aabergs ran a blog called The Daily Hitler, incorporating Nazi imagery in commentary on contemporary society.

In September 2018, Aaberg suffered a major stroke affecting his cerebellum and brainstem. This event left him in critical condition, severely weakened and requiring life support.

== Works ==
=== Pork ===
PORK Magazine was created by husband-and-wife artist team Sean Aaberg and Katie Aaberg in 2010. PORK magazine has been a big catalyst for Weirdo Art and Rock&Roll, with an emphasis on street culture elements like denim, studs, pizza, burgers, switchblades and anti-social behavior. Its roots are in 70s New York City. It was a free magazine and in circulation between 2010 and 2018.

From its inception until February 2017, PORK regularly incorporated Nazi imagery. Beginning in 2017, such images were removed from the magazine as a response to changing "national circumstances", according to an interview with founder Sean Aaberg.
