= The Time Traveller (fanzine) =

The Time Traveller was one of the earliest science-fiction fanzines, started in 1932. The title was inspired by the protagonist of The Time Machine by H.G. Wells.

== History ==
The Time Traveller grew out of a New York City fan club called The Scienceers and was started by Mort Weisinger, Julius Schwartz, Allen Glasser, and Forrest J Ackerman. Initially, Glasser was the "Editor" of the fanzine, Weisinger "Associate Editor," Schwartz "Managing Editor," and Ackerman "Contributing Editor." (Three of the four editors were 15–17 years old at the time. Allen Glasser was born in 1908.) The first issue was published in January 1932.

Following accusations of plagiarism against Glasser for work published in Wonder Stories Quarterly and Amazing Stories, Schwartz and Weisinger left and started another fanzine, Science Fiction Digest (SFD). The first issue was published in September 1932.The Time Traveller, now floundering, was absorbed by SFD in starting in November of the same year. A ninth and final issue of The Time Traveller was released in early 1933.

== Legacy ==
According to SF historian Sam Moskowitz, The Time Traveller was the first fanzine to be devoted exclusively to science fiction. It was also the first fanzine not strictly associated with a club and, starting with its third issue, the first to be typeset.

== See also ==
- Cosmos - A serialized, round-robin novel published in Science Fiction Digest between 1933 and 1935.
