= Chainsaw (punk zine) =

English punk magazine, 1977–1984

Chainsaw fanzine no.2, September/October 1977

Chainsaw fanzine no.10, August 1980

Chainsaw, a punk zine edited by "Charlie Chainsaw" was published in suburban Croydon in 1977 and ran to fourteen issues before ceasing publication in 1984. A hand-lettered 'n' became a stylised trademark in articles after the 'n' key broke on the editor's typewriter. In addition to a free flexi disc promoting two or three up-and-coming punk bands, 1980s issues featured cartoon strips and two innovative colour covers by Michael J. Weller. 1970s issues featured the cartoon strip 'Hitler's Kids', authored by Andrew Marr using punk nom-de-plume "Willie D" at the beginning of his successful journalistic career. Charlie Chainsaw formed the band Rancid Hell Spawn when the punk zine discontinued.
