= Capitol Crisis =

Punk zine for Washington, D.C., U.S.

Capitol Crisis was a fanzine from the Washington, D.C. punk scene created by musician and disc jockey, Xyra Harper. The zine published five issues from November 1980 to May 1981 and was part of the foundation for D.C.'s emerging punk music scene. According to scholar Shayna Maskell, Harper and Capitol Crisis "worked to contest the dominant maleness of D.C. hardcore and its cultural production."

Harper has been a disc jockey at Georgetown University's campus radio station, WGTB, in the late 1970s. Following WGTB's shutdown by campus authorities, Harper sought to translate the musical energies of her radio show into print, which led to the production of Capitol Crisis. The scholar and musician John R. Davis wrote that Capitol Crisis was a "crackling, chaotic labor of love" with "a consistent look that, while seemingly rough around the edges, had clearly been produced with thought and skill. Clipped-out reviews and artwork rested on patterned backgrounds shimmering with texture, while the distinctive hand-lettering gives the zine a defining look."

Issues included reviews of recordings, bands, and venues in the area, some of which were sent in by readers. Capitol Crisis satirized advice columns with a section dubbed "Ask Auntie Xyra," where Harper responded to readers' questions on a variety of topics ranging from music taste to life advice. Some of the bands and musicians interviewed in Capitol Crisis included Black Market Baby, Black Flag, Tuxedomoon, Joan Jett, and the Mighty Invaders.

Punk scholar and historian Kevin Mattson was later critical of Capitol Crisis for its "surprisingly conservative" coverage of punk within the D.C. scene, noting that Harper initially favored older bands in the scene like the Slickee Boys and Insect Surfers, rather than extensively covering the newer hardcore punk bands like the Teen Idles or Bad Brains. Harper received push back on this at the time, too, when young hardcore punks like Ian MacKaye, Henry Rollins, Alec MacKaye, and others involved with the emerging Dischord Records scene wrote in to complain about the slant of Capitol Crisis' coverage. Harper urged the younger punks to contribute writings to the zine, which several of them did.

A complete run of the zine can be found at the University of Maryland, College Park's Special Collections in Performing Arts (SCPA). It was also included SCPA's “Persistent Vision” online exhibition on archival materials from the Washington, D.C. punk community.
