= Sluggo! =

- January 1980 cover
- Categories: Music magazine
- Founded: 1978
- First issue: December 1978
- Final issue: 1979
- Country: USA
- Based in: Austin, Texas
- Language: English

Sluggo! was an Austin, Texas fanzine covering the late 1970s punk rock/new wave music scene.

== History and profile ==
Founded in 1978 by Nick West and E.A. Srere, Sluggo! began as a tabloid-sized photocopied publication, and evolved into a quintessential DIY publication. The first issue appeared in December 1978. With the donation of a Multilith 1250 offset press and an array of colored inks, Sluggo! acquired its distinctive multi-colored, multi-faceted appearance. Sluggo! look was also defined by its unique covers – hand-crafted on some issues, individually silk-screened on black velvet on the finale.

The early issues centered primarily on music with reviews of shows of both local and touring bands, and record reviews of both national and international acts such as Pere Ubu, PIL, Throbbing Gristle. In addition to music, Sluggo! columnists also held forth on subjects ranging from religion to science, international politics to local gossip.

In 1979, Sluggo! departed from the typical music fanzine with the introduction of its thematic issues. Topics were Violence, Unco, and culminated with its "Industrial Collapse" issue. The magazine also created the Instant Review, publishing critiques of local performances overnight with free distribution on the streets the very next day. The Sluggo! press was used not only for printing the fanzine but was also made available to local bands for printing band posters and record covers, and to other raconteurs for printing various handbills and broadsides. Sluggo! House became one of the centers of the exploding Austin scene and drew considerable local and national attention as a hotbed of musical and artistic action.

Sluggo! provided inspiration to other writers and entrepreneurs to found and publish their own fanzines including Xiphoid Process and Contempo Culture from Austin, and a myriad of others throughout Texas. Sluggo!'s topical format also served as a model to the staff at Search & Destroy Magazine from San Francisco to expand their horizons and begin the RE/Search magazine with issues devoted to a single topic.

Sluggo! was a primary ambassador of the 1970s Austin punk/new wave scene throughout Texas, the nation and overseas. Its evolution from a modest home grown fanzine to a distinctively quirky journal with ambitions of a wider cultural window mirrors the peculiar growth of the Austin punk music and artistic scene, and its future development into the behemoth it is today. It ceased publication in 1979.

== See also ==
- Raul's (night club)
