= OP Magazine =

American music magazine

OP Magazine, based in Olympia, Washington, was a music fanzine published by John Foster and the Lost Music Network (leading to the title, which extends the abbreviation LMN to LMNOP) from 1979 to 1984. It was known for its diverse scope and the role it played in providing publicity to DIY musicians in the midst of the cassette culture. The magazine was co-founded by Foster, Toni Holm, Dana Squires, and David Rauh. An emphasis of the magazine was "articles about music written by musicians", and regular contributors included Victoria Glavin (Victoria Barreca), Peter Garland, Eugene Chadbourne, and Larry Polansky.

When Foster ended OP after only twenty-six issues, (labeled A-Z, with topics within beginning with that issue's letter), he held a conference, offering the magazine's resources to parties interested in carrying on; two magazines became the dual successors to OP's legacy: attendant journalist David Ciaffardini went on to start Sound Choice, which published until 1992, while Scott Becker, alongside Richie Unterberger, founded Option, lasting until 1998.

Foster, Holm, and Rauh administered the Olympia-based radio station KXXO.
