= Sniffin' Glue =

British punk zine, started in 1976

- First issue cover.
- Editor: Mark Perry
- Staff writers: Mark Perry; Danny Baker
- Categories: Music magazine
- Frequency: Monthly
- Circulation: 50 – 15,000
- Publisher: Mark Perry
- Founder: Mark Perry
- Founded: 1976
- First issue: July 13, 1976; 49 years ago
- Final issue Number: August 1977; 12
- Country: United Kingdom
- Based in: Deptford, South London
- Language: English
- Website: https://sniffinglue.co.uk/

Sniffin' Glue and Other Rock 'N' Roll Habits for punks, widely known as simply Sniffin' Glue, was a British monthly punk zine started by Mark Perry in July 1976 and released for about a year. The name is derived from a Ramones song "Now I Wanna Sniff Some Glue." Some of the zine's writers, such as Danny Baker, later became well-known journalists.

Although initial issues only sold 50 copies, circulation soon increased to 15,000. The innovative appeal of Sniffin' Glue was its immediacy:

"Sniffin' Glue was not so much badly written as barely written; grammar was non-existent, layout was haphazard, headlines were usually just written in felt tip, swearwords were often used in lieu of a reasoned argument. . .all of which gave Sniffin' Glue its urgency and relevance."

The early days of the punk movement largely failed to attract the attention of television or the mainstream press, and Sniffin' Glue was a key source of photographs of, and information about, contributors to the scene.

NME acclaimed Sniffin' Glue as "the nastiest, healthiest and funniest piece of press in the history of rock'n'roll habits" and it became a chronicle of the early days of British punk rock as well as pioneering the DIY punk ethic. For the final issue Mark's sidekick Sniffin' Glue photographer, business affairs and later band manager Harry Murlowski recorded "Love Lies Limp" released as a flexi disc record - the first release from Mark Perry's band Alternative TV.

Fearing absorption into the mainstream music press, Perry ceased publication in 1977. In the last issues he encouraged his readers to follow him with their own punk fanzines.

Sniffin' Glue is often incorrectly credited as the source of the illustration featuring drawings of three guitar chord shapes, captioned, "this is a chord, this is another, this is a third. Now form a band", this drawing actually originally appeared in January 1977 in another fanzine Sideburns and was later reproduced in The Stranglers' fanzine Strangled.

In 2000, Mark Perry published Sniffin' Glue: The Essential Punk Accessory, which is a compilation of all the issues of the fanzine with some new material written by him. Sniffin' Glue is referenced in the song "Three Sevens Clash" by The Alarm, a tribute to 1977, and a follow on from their previous punk tribute "45 RPM".
