= Diseased Pariah News =

Zine by/for people with HIV/AIDS

- Editor/Co-Founder: Beowulf Thorne
- Editor/Co-Founder: Tom ‘Tommy’ Shearer
- Editor: Tom ‘Tommy’ Ace
- Editor/Editrix: Michael Botkin
- Photographer: Bob Smith (‘Mod Bob’)
- Categories: Lifestyle magazine
- Format: Zine
- Total circulation: 5000
- First issue: 1990
- Final issue Number: 1999; 11
- Country: United States
- Based in: San Francisco Bay Area, CA
- Language: English
- Website: web.archive.org/web/20160624103522/http://www.diseasedpariahnews.com/

Diseased Pariah News (DPN) was a zine published "by, for and about" people with HIV and AIDS in the 1990s. The publication used black humor and shock humor to address many of the issues that affected people who had been diagnosed with HIV or AIDS.

While the publication dealt with issues related to having HIV/AIDS in a humorous, if dark, manner, many of the articles contained factual information about managing and living with the disease. The content was largely aimed at gay men, but the editors routinely acknowledged AIDS as a global concern and solicited material from "diseased pariahs" of all kinds. All of the main four editors of the zine were HIV-positive and/or had AIDS, and as of 2010, Tom Ace was the only surviving member of the editorial team.

== Title and logo ==
The name of the zine came from a cartoon from The Advocate about how Delta Air Lines refused to seat a passenger who had AIDS. In the caption, an airport gate agent asked an emaciated ticket-holder, "Will that be smoking, nonsmoking, or diseased pariah?"

The official mascot of DPN is the oncomouse. This animal was chosen as the editors felt they were natural pariahs, due to the fact they were bred to generate tumors.

== Content ==
The irreverence and black humor of the magazine were attempts by the editors and contributors to fight what they felt was a view in the media of people infected with HIV as "languishing saints" or "hug objects". The editors sought to reject this label imposed on them and embrace their identity as "diseased pariahs". Scholars have seen this and a related zine called "Infected Faggot Perspectives" as counterpublics, spaces where marginalized cultures can create their own discourse and identity, outside of the one imposed on them by society.

=== Notable columns ===
- Captain Condom
- AIDS Barbie & KS Ken
- Piss Jesse (A reference to Jesse Helms' objection to Piss Christ)
- Get Fat, Don't Die!

== Archives ==
The California-based GLBT Historical Society has digitized all eleven issues of Diseased Pariah News and made them available online within their archived collection containing the papers of DPN editor and co-founder Beowulf Thorne. In addition to the issues themselves, the Thorne collection also contains other drafts, documents and photographs pertaining to the publication and its editorial team.

Prior to the GLBT Historical Society's digital archives, the New York Public Library digitized the first eight issues of Diseased Pariah News and posted them online at their ‘Online DPN Archive’. While the original landing page of the archive is no longer functional, the eight scanned issues are still available.

Scanned copies of 11 issues are at the Internet Archive.
