= Slug and Lettuce (fanzine) =

- Categories: Music magazine, Zine
- Founder: Christine Boarts
- Founded: 1987
- Country: United States
- Based in: New York City, Richmond, Virginia
- Language: English

Slug and Lettuce is a free newsprint punk zine started in State College, Pennsylvania by Christine Boarts in 1987. In 1989 CBL and S&L relocated to New York City where the zine's print run steadily grew and increased to 10,000 with free worldwide distribution. In 1997, CBL and S&L relocated to Richmond, Virginia. Its byline reads "A zine supporting the Do-It-Yourself ethics of the punk community". The print version ended in 2007 with edition #90, and the PO Box was closed in 2016.

== History and profile ==
Slug and Lettuce was started in 1987. It is published quarterly and is edited by Christine Boarts, who also writes a column for Maximum Rocknroll and runs a book distribution business. She describes her zine as "providing space for communication and networking within underground music and political scenes" and states that "it was through her zine that she forged connections to the larger underground scene which gave her the 'inspiration and dedication' to chart a course for herself outside the mainstream" (quoted in Notes from Underground: Zines and the Politics of Alternative Culture).

== Contents ==
Each issue contains columns with DIY/anarcho-punk themes pertaining to anti-authoritarian politics, vegetarian/vegan action, radical parenting, DIY culture, gardening and activism generally. Slug and Lettuce also features zine, book, and record reviews and Christine Boarts' band photography.

Slug and Lettuce has featured the comic Zero Content by Fly, the Folk Punk art of Jeremy Clark and the Medieval Punk art of Sean Aaberg.

In issue number 89 in autumn 2006, Christine Boarts Larson announces that issue 90 will be the twentieth anniversary issue. It is postponed to May 2007 owing to her pregnancy. The 20th anniversary issue - #90 came out in the fall of 2007.

== Archive & Website ==
In a 2014 Interview, Larson stated that much of the zine's photography and articles had been archived to the zine's website.

== See also ==
- Punk zine
