= Jeff Miller (writer) =

Canadian writer (born 1979)

- Born: 1979 (age 46–47); Ottawa, Ontario, Canada
- Education: Concordia University
- Occupation: Writer
- Writing career
- Language: English
- Period: 1996–present
- Notable work: Ghost Pine
- Notable awards: Expozine Alternative Press Award (Best English Book); 2010 Ghost Pine: All Stories True
- Website: theghostpine.ca

Jeff Miller is a zine publisher and writer. He began writing in 1996 with an Ottawa zine called Otaku, which later changed its name to Ghost Pine following his move to Montreal in 1999. It has sold over 10,000 copies. He writes largely about punk and other sub-cultures.

The best of his works were compiled into a book, Ghost Pine: All Stories True by Invisible Publishing in 2010. It was on the Montreal Gazette's top-10 bestseller's list for three weeks, and won in the Best English Book at Montreal's 2010 Expozine Alternative Press Awards.

Miller was born and raised in Ottawa, where he began writing on the hardcore punk scene in the mid-90s. He lived in Montreal on and off from 1999 to the late 2000s and currently resides on Nova Scotia's Eastern Shore.

His work has been included in anthologies like The Art of Trespassing, and he has embarked upon small US and Canadian reading tours with zine writers Cindy Crabb, Erica Lyle, and Aaron Cometbus. He is also involved in the writing workshop Soulgazers and speaks at events like Expozine.

== Bibliography ==
- Ghost Pine: All Stories True. Halifax: Invisible Publishing. 2010. ISBN 9781926743042.
- Temporary Palaces: A Novel. House of Anansi. 2026. ISBN 9781487013004.
