= Queer's Gambit =

Chess club in New York

Queer's Gambit is a chess club in Brooklyn, New York, serving the LGBTQ community. Founded in 2023 by Niki Cross, Queer's Gambit combines chess with anti-imperialist political activism. Events feature chess sets in pink, white, and blue---the colors of the Transgender flag---alongside support for local and international political movements. The club was founded as a space for queer and gender-minority chess players following widespread reports of sexual assault against women in chess and FIDE's ban on transgender players in women's sections. Their events have a "no mansplaining" policy and discourage hierarchical competition.

The club publishes the zine Forking Trans Women, a chess publication containing records of blitz games played at the club, tutorials on how to play, and works on queer and trans sexuality among chess players. The title is a pun on the fork tactic in chess and Fucking Trans Women, a 2010 zine on trans sexuality. As of August 2026, three issues have been published.
