= Roberto Refinetti =

Brazilian physiologist (born 1957)

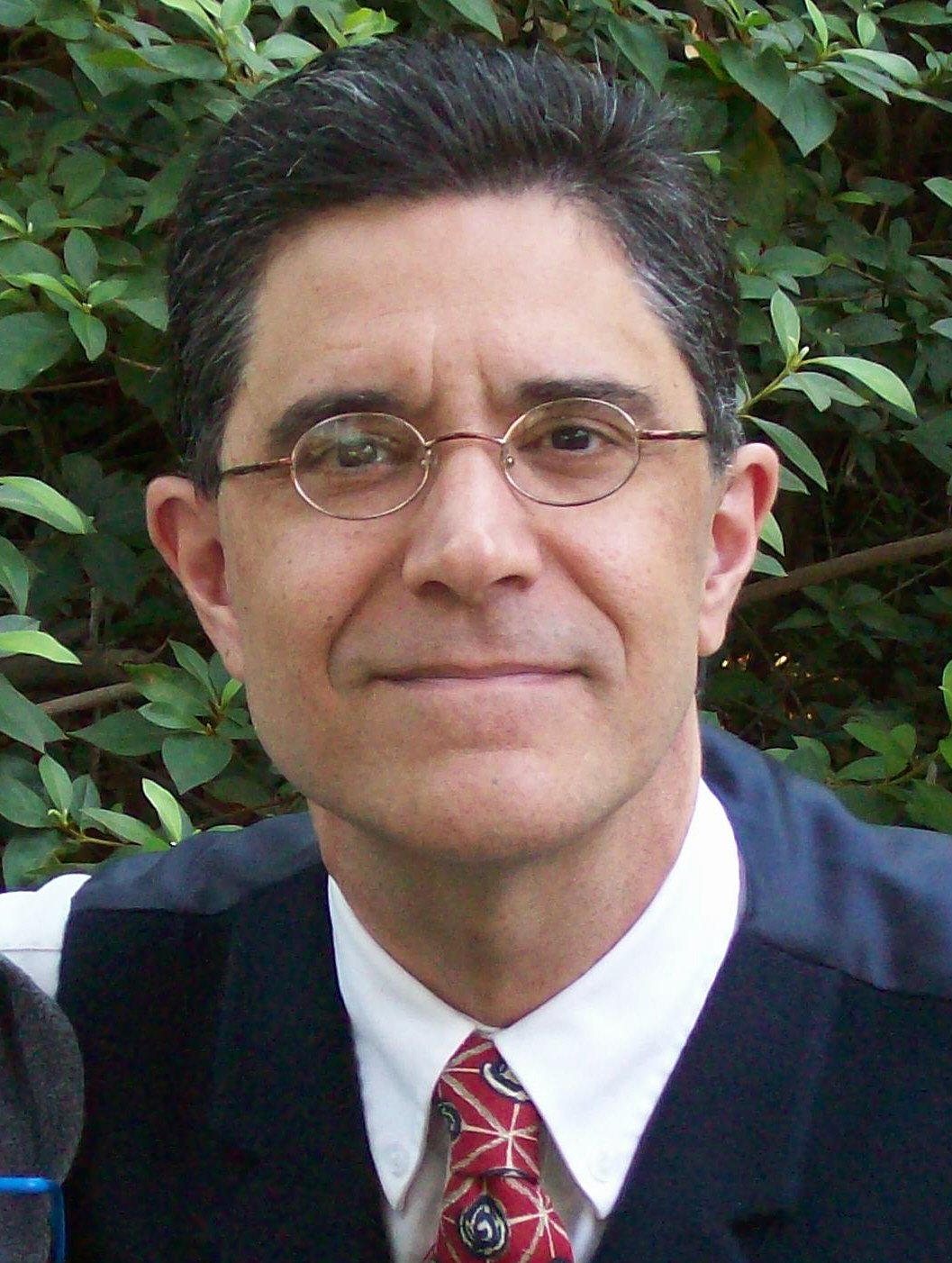
- Roberto Refinetti, 2008
- Born: 19 November 1957 (age 68); São Paulo, Brazil
- Education: University of California, Santa Barbara
- Known for: Circadian Physiology
- Scientific career
- Fields: Physiology; Philosophy; Psychology
- Workplaces: University of São Paulo; University of California, Santa Barbara; University of Illinois; University of Virginia; College of William and Mary; University of South Carolina; Boise State University; University of New Orleans

Roberto Refinetti (/rəfɪˈnɛtɪ/; born November 19, 1957) is a behavioral physiologist and higher-education administrator. He is best known for his book Circadian Physiology.

== Behavioral physiology ==
Refinetti earned his doctoral degree in psychology from the University of California, Santa Barbara in 1987 and has been a researcher or university professor at the University of Illinois at Urbana-Champaign, the University of Virginia, the College of William and Mary, the University of South Carolina, Boise State University, and the University of New Orleans. In the late 1980s, he taught Introduction to Psychology at the University of São Paulo. He is the editor-in-chief of the interdisciplinary journals Chronobiology International and Sexuality & Culture, as well as section editor of BMC Physiology and editorial board member of the Journal of Thermal Biology, of Biological Rhythm Research, and of Acta Scientiae Veterinariae. He has served as consultant for numerous journalists and media producers on a variety of topics related to biological rhythms, as recorded in newspaper articles on seasonal affective disorder, on daylight-saving time, on the pervasiveness of circadian rhythms, and on myths about lunar cycles in human behavior.

== Notable publications ==
Refinetti is best known as the author of Circadian Physiology, a comprehensive book on circadian rhythms (first edition: 1999; second edition: 2006; third edition: 2016), that has received positive reviews. His research program has been funded by grants from the National Science Foundation and the National Institutes of Health. According to Google Scholar, his four most cited articles are:

- Refinetti, Roberto; Menaker, Michael (March 1992). "The circadian rhythm of body temperature". Physiology & Behavior. 51 (3): 613–637. doi:10.1016/0031-9384(92)90188-8. PMID 1523238. S2CID 27734031.
- Refinetti, Roberto; Cornelissen, Germaine C.; Halberg, Franz (2007). "Procedures for numerical analysis of circadian rhythms". Biological Rhythm Research. 38 (4): 275–325. Bibcode:2007BioRR..38..275R. doi:10.1080/09291010600903692. PMC 3663600. PMID 23710111.
- Refinetti, Roberto (2004). "Non-stationary time series and the robustness of circadian rhythms". Journal of Theoretical Biology. 227 (4): 571–581. Bibcode:2004JThBi.227..571R. doi:10.1016/j.jtbi.2003.11.032. PMID 15038991.
- Refinetti, Roberto (1999). "Relationship between the daily rhythms of locomotor activity and body temperature in eight mammalian species". The American Journal of Physiology. 277 (5 Pt 2): R1493–R1500. doi:10.1152/ajpregu.1999.277.5.R1493. PMID 10564224.

== Higher education administration ==
After 20 years in academia administering his own research program as a faculty member and the research programs of others as a journal editor, ad hoc peer reviewer, and review panel member for funding agencies, Refinetti took on the position of academic dean at a satellite campus of the University of South Carolina in 2006. In 2014, he moved to Idaho as the chair of the department of psychology at Boise State University. In 2020, he moved to Louisiana as the chair of the department of psychology at the University of New Orleans.

== Awards ==
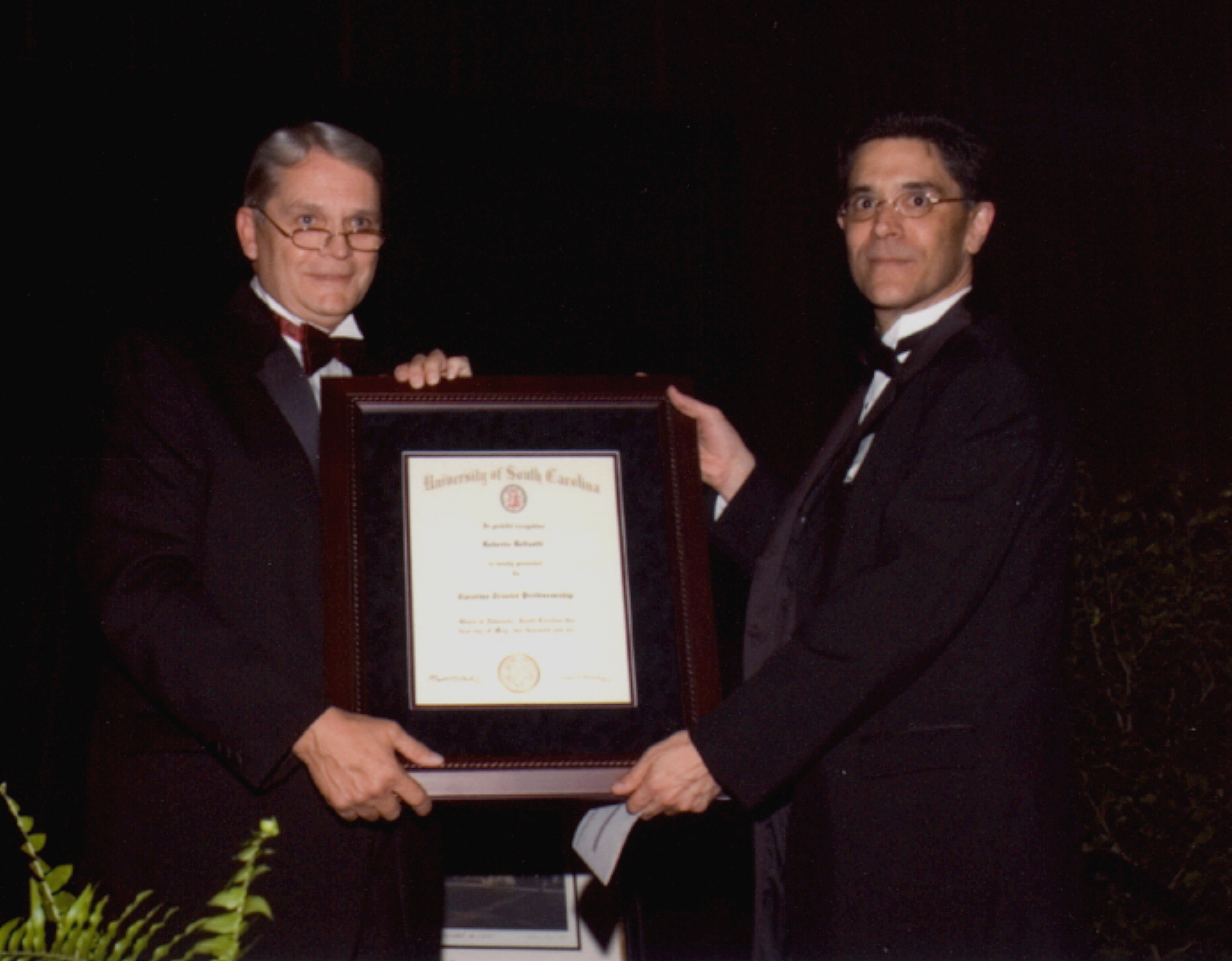
Refinetti (right) receiving the Carolina Trustee Professorship award

Refinetti was named a Distinguished Professor by the South Carolina Commission on Higher Education in 2004, when he was a finalist in the annual process to identify and honor the South Carolina Governor's Professor of the Year. He was awarded a Carolina Trustee Professorship by the Board of Trustees of the University of South Carolina in 2006 because of his record of teaching excellence and of outstanding performance in research and in public service activities. In June 2019, he was elected Fellow of the American Physiological Society for his contributions to the physiological sciences.
