= Mira Bellwether =

American author (1982–2022)

- Bellwether in 2021
- Born: March 31, 1982
- Died: December 25, 2022 (aged 40); New York City, U.S.
- Occupations: Author; illustrator; sex educator
- Writing career
- Language: English
- Years active: 2010–2022
- Subject: Transgender sexuality
- Notable work: Fucking Trans Women

Mira Bellwether (Note: Bellwether gave the full name Miranda Darling Bellwether on the inside back cover to Fucking Trans Women, but otherwise, including on the zine's front cover, went by Mira; she is referred to as Mira in coverage of her death.) (March 31, 1982 – December 25, 2022) was an American author, artist, and sex educator best known for Fucking Trans Women, a single-issue zine in which she wrote and illustrated all articles. Described in Sexuality & Culture as "a comprehensive guide to trans women's sexuality", Fucking Trans Women was the first publication of note to focus on sex with trans women and was innovative in its focus on trans women's own perspectives and its inclusion of instructions for many of the sex acts depicted. Bellwether was also an advocate for transgender women and in opposition to trans-exclusionary feminism.

Bellwether's work has served as an influence to trans writers, journalists, and scholars, particularly in the field of transgender sexuality. Her death in 2022 was met with grief in the trans community, in which her work had attained a "mythic status" according to Kai Cheng Thom in Xtra.

== Early life and gender transition ==
Mira Bellwether was born on March 31, 1982. Her mother, Tammy, was a hospice nurse; her father, Terry, was a respiratory therapist. In her youth she was diagnosed with an autoimmune disease, a disability that would frame the rest of her life. Raised in the U.S. state of Iowa, she began playing dress-up with girls starting at the age of six, ending when her parents moved to a more rural area in her teens. Describing herself later as "the smallest, slightest boy [she] knew", Bellwether experimented with women's clothing and makeup—drag, in her words—while at the same time exploring her sexuality. She left Iowa as soon as she was able to. As of 2010, she described herself as "a trans dyke and student ... a femme, a queer, a dork, a cocksucker, and lots of other things".

== Fucking Trans Women and sex education ==
In 2010, living in Iowa at the time, Bellwether self-published Fucking Trans Women #0, intended as the first issue of a zine about sex with trans women. Finding submitted materials insufficient, she chose to make the zine a solo effort and number it "#0" to leave room for a "#1" featuring others' contributions. (Bellwether grew frustrated in subsequent years as, despite issue #0's popularity, submissions for issue #1 failed to materialize.) The zine (sometimes abbreviated FTW) explores a variety of sexual activities involving trans women, (Note: Some sources, including Burns 2017, Hill-Meyer 2022, and Valens 2022a, discuss Fucking Trans Women in the context of transfeminine people more generally, rather than only trans women.) primarily ones who are pre-op or non-op with respect to bottom surgery. Bellwether emphasized sex acts possible with flaccid penises or not involving penises at all, writing that "almost all sexual discourse on penises" was "on erect penises, hard penises, penetrating penises". Bellwether emphasized this point throughout the rest of her life. She told Autostraddle in 2013:

One thing that I really tried to capture in FTW was that there are all sorts of ways to pleasure trans women. I gave a lot of time to soft penises for this reason, because in sexual literature they are almost completely ignored, and if they're not ignored, they're treated as defective or at rest or, even worse, an object of pity or scorn.

This attitude subverted prevailing associations regarding inability to become erect. Lucie Fielding's Trans Sex (2021) cites Bellwether on this topic among others. Fielding later said of Bellwether's influence on her, "Her work is stating that our bodies should not just be tolerable or accepted, but that they are there to be joyously experienced", crediting Fucking Trans Women as "a huge lightbulb moment" in her own gender transition.

Bellwether coined the term muffing in Fucking Trans Women to refer to stimulation of the inguinal canals with fingers, testicles, or both—a practice she discovered by accident while tucking. The zine in turn popularized that act. Muffing has since received coverage in Autostraddle, Playboy, Broadly, and The Daily Dot, with Fielding promoting it in Trans Sex and in Jessica Stoya's sex advice column with Slate. Bellwether likewise continued to promote muffing as an affirming form of masturbation in the years following the release of Fucking Trans Woman.

Fucking Trans Women is heavily colored by Bellwether's own experiences as a disabled trans woman. Sexual health scholars Riggs et al. write in an editorial, "To speak of Mira Bellwether ... as a powerful trans advocate also requires speaking about Mira as a woman who lived in the context of a health-care system that failed to meet her needs." Writes Sloane Holzer in Them:

The innovative determination it takes to survive in the world as a disabled person is evident in FTW and all of Mira's writing about sex. She was tenacious and endlessly curious, always focused on sharing new, accessible ways to move through a hostile world and still find pleasure.

The zine is translated, printed and distributed in French in 2019 by Mirza Hélène Deneuve, a French trans activist and geochemist. The title in french is "Baiser les Meufs Trans". It is cited in the French essay "Te lécher jusqu'à m'étouffer, la bite des meufs et le lesbianisme" (translated as Licking You Until I Choke, Dyke Dick and Lesbianism) as a zine the author read before having sex with her first girlfriend, who was trans.

== Personal life and advocacy ==
In her 20s and early 30s, Bellwether moved numerous times around the U.S. to cities including Chicago, Austin, and San Francisco, ultimately settling down in 2016 in New York City with her husband, who had read Fucking Trans Women for advice on dating his first trans girlfriend years prior to meeting Bellwether. In 2020, the two launched a GoFundMe seeking funds for Bellwether's planned vaginoplasty.

Bellwether was a strong critic of Valerie Solanas's radical feminist work SCUM Manifesto. In the context of some criticizing Solanas as trans-exclusionary, Bellwether wrote on her blog that the manifesto was "the pinnacle of misguided and hateful second-wave feminism and lesbian feminism". She accused Solanas of biological essentialism for equating maleness with having a Y chromosome in order to argue that "the male is an incomplete female, a walking abortion". In the essay "On Liking Women", Andrea Long Chu objects to Bellwether's association of Solanas with lesbian feminism and argues that, by associating trans-exclusionary radical feminism with second-wave feminism, Bellwether incorrectly implies that it is a relic of the past.

In 2015, Bellwether advocated for the release of an Illinois trans woman who was arrested after checking in to a Des Moines, Iowa, hotel with an ID bearing a male gender marker. Bellwether's other advocacy for trans women included supporting Camp Trans and speaking out for access to transgender hormone therapy. According to her widower, on at least one occasion she bailed out a transgender sex worker but took no credit.

== Illness, death, and legacy ==
Bellwether was diagnosed with lung cancer in October 2021. The cancer returned at stage four in September 2022. On December 19, 2022, two weeks into a hospital stay, Bellwether was admitted to an intensive care unit, where she had a massive stroke; she died on December 25 beside her husband and sister. News of her death led to an outpouring of grief within many trans communities. Bellwether's widower subsequently proclaimed March 31, 2023—Bellwether's birthday, and also International Transgender Day of Visibility—the "First Annual Mira Bellwether Buy a Trans Woman a Pizza Day", pizza in the trans community often serving as a placeholder for any sort of care.

Trans author Emily Zhou described her short story collection Girlfriends as inspired by Bellwether's work. Ro White of Autostraddle, obituarizing Bellwether, said that "Writing about trans bodies in a way that centers playfulness—or really, writing about trans bodies at all—was revolutionary in 2010, and it's still revolutionary today." Ana Valens, who had frequently written about Bellwether's work, credited her career to her, writing in a tweet that Fucking Trans Women had "changed the landscape of trans and queer sexuality" and "saved countless trans people and opened their eyes to what their bodies can do and be". Kai Cheng Thom in Xtra Magazine wrote that "Bellwether profoundly transformed the conversation around trans women and sex, to the extent that her zine has attained mythic status among us: We tell each other about it as though we are passing on community lore to one another."

Riggs et al.'s December 2023 editorial in Women's Reproductive Health highlights the "outpouring of tributes" for "the late and great Mira Bellwether" as showing "how her words gave trans women and their lovers a voice to speak about desire and pleasure, when no one else outside of trans communities was speaking about trans women as desirable". Holzer's profile in Them, published several months after Bellwether's death, begins, "Few people have done more to expand our understanding of women's sexuality than Mira Bellwether".
