= Tryke =

Tryke may refer to:

- A tricycle
- A slang term for a lesbian trans woman (a blend of transsexual and dyke). A somewhat obscure term, it originated in the 1990s and has, perhaps, fallen into disuse.
