= Black Zine Fair =

Annual event focusing on Black publishing

- Status: active
- Genre: literary festival
- Frequency: annually
- Location: New York City
- Years active: 2024-present
- Founders: Neta Bomani and Mariame Kaba
- Most recent: May 9, 2026
- Organiser: Sojourners for Justice Press
- Website: https://blackzinefair.org/

Black Zine Fair is an annual event focusing on Black publishing.

The inaugural Black Zine Fair was on May 11, 2024, at Powerhouse Arts in Brooklyn, New York. The fair, founded by Mariame Kaba and co-directed by Neta Bomani, was developed by the Sojourners for Justice Press, emerging out of an academic fellowship project for Binding Our Stories: Black DIY Publishing into the Future, and launched as a celebration of all things Black and independent publishing (especially those "led by Black people and/or focus on subject matter surrounding Blackness") and featured 30 to 50 exhibitors. The Schomburg Center Literary Festival also hosted a mini Black Zine Fair in June of that year. The second Black Zine Fair was also held at Powerhouse Arts on May 3, 2025. It was reported that the second fair drew over 1,000 attendees. The third fair was again held at Powerhouse Arts on May 9, 2026. The fair has remained free for all attendees since its inception.

During each fair, independent publishers sell or trade zines, and lead workshops. Recent Black Zine Fairs have included "the Black Reading Room, a site-specific installation which brings together historical and contemporary zines, pamphlets, and small press publications into a shared space for reading".

Health Stellium has supplied the fair with N95 grade masks for all attendees and air purifiers throughout the Powerhouse Arts venue since the fair's inception.

Reports on the rise of zines and zine fairs, including those that cater to specific groups, mention Black Zine Fair as an example. The fair has served as a spark for research into the history of Black publishing more broadly, such as in Detroit.
