= Fucking Trans Women =

Zine about sexual activities involving trans women

- Cover of issue #0
- Author: Mira Bellwether
- Illustrator: Bellwether
- Cover artist: Bellwether
- Language: English
- Publisher: Self-published
- Publication date: October 2010 (digital); August 2013 (print)
- Publication place: United States
- Media type: Zine
- Pages: 80
- ISBN: 9781492128939 (print edition)
- Website: Official website

Fucking Trans Women (FTW) is a zine created by Mira Bellwether. A single 80-page issue, numbered "#0", was published in October 2010 and republished in 2013 as Fucking Trans Women: A Zine About the Sex Lives of Trans Women; further issues were planned, but none had been published as of Bellwether's death in December 2022.

Bellwether wrote all of the issue's articles, which explore a variety of sexual activities involving trans women, (Note: Some sources, including Burns 2017, Hill-Meyer 2022, and Valens 2022a, discuss Fucking Trans Women in the context of transfeminine people more generally, rather than only trans women.) primarily ones who are pre-op or non-op with respect to bottom surgery. Fucking Trans Women was the first publication of note to focus on sex with trans women and was innovative in its focus on trans women's own perspectives and its inclusion of instructions for many of the sex acts depicted. Emphasizing sex acts possible with flaccid penises or not involving penises at all, it coined the term muffing to refer to stimulation of the inguinal canals, an act it popularized. The zine has received both popular-culture and scholarly attention, and was described in Sexuality & Culture as "a comprehensive guide to trans women's sexuality" and in Playboy as "widely considered" the "most in-depth guide to having sex with pre- and non-op trans femme bodies".

== Background ==
Mira Bellwether, (Note: Bellwether gives the full name Miranda Darling Bellwether on the inside back cover, but otherwise in her life, including on the zine's front cover, went by Mira; she is referred to as Mira in coverage of her death.) a self-described "trans dyke" then living in the U.S. state of Iowa, (Note: According to Holzer 2023, Bellwether left her home state of Iowa as soon as she could and moved around the United States extensively in her 20s and early 30s. However, according to Bellwether 2010, p. i, she lived in Iowa at least at the time she finished Fucking Trans Women.) created the zine over the course of "a year or so". She was inspired partly by the 1970s–1980s magazine Drag and what she described as "a spirit of sisterhood and cooperation between drag queens, transsexuals, and crossdressers manifested in articles that talked about our commonalities and shared experiences as well as our shared political struggles across communities". She intended to publish a zine featuring submissions from others, but found the material insufficient; she instead chose to make the zine a solo effort and number it "#0" to leave room for a "#1" featuring others' contributions. In an interview with Kennedy Nadler of Autostraddle in 2013, she wrote that she "wanted to speak to aspects of our sexuality that are almost never given any attention in media whatsoever: those of us who enjoy sex with other women, trans and otherwise, and some of the difficulties (as well as unique pleasures) of trans women having sex with cis women".

Fucking Trans Women #0 was published online in October 2010, billed as an "80-Page Giant". Bellwether republished it in print through CreateSpace in August 2013, without the "#0" and with the subtitle A Zine About the Sex Lives of Trans Women.

== Design ==
The zine's cover depicts a woman in a leotard (with prominent crotch bulge) and open jacket holding a whip. At her feet, indistinct figures run around in a ring.

Rachel Stevens and Megan Purdy of WomenWriteAboutComics characterized the design as "intentionally messy". The zine is black and white, with articles overlaid on grayscale images of nude or erotically-posed women. For many of the acts Bellwether depicted, no scientific diagrams existed, and so she illustrated them herself, an innovative approach for the time.

== Content ==
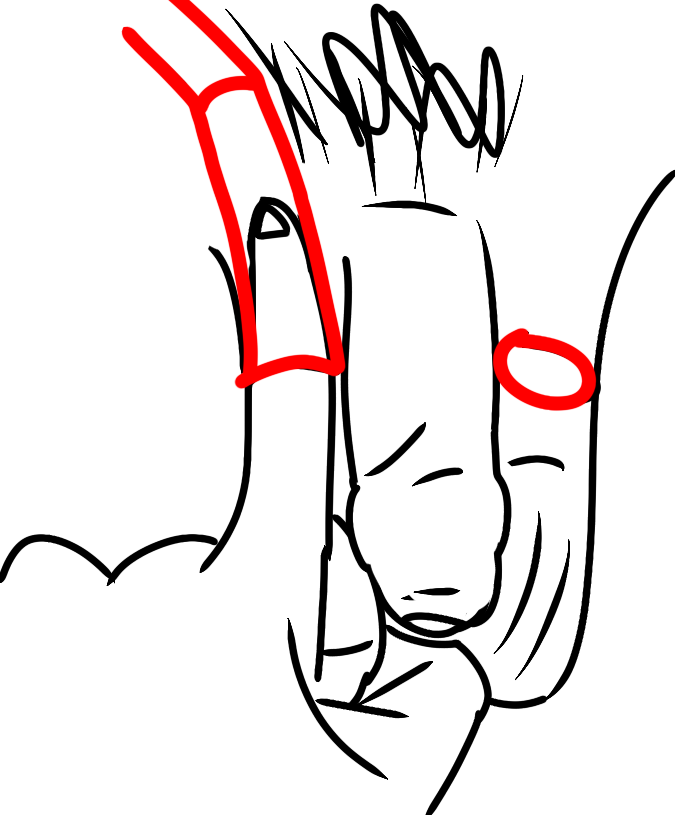
Diagram of muffing (invaginating the scrotum and penetrating the inguinal canals) showing the canals and superficial inguinal ring in red

"I think one of the ideas in FTW that I'm the most proud of is that the penis can be an organ for receiving pleasure in any state."

— Bellwether, interview in Autostraddle

Rather than set a cohesive narrative, Bellwether focused on trans women's physical experiences. She highlighted both how trans women's bodies differ from cis men's and how they are similar to cis women's bodies, such as the structures of the penis and clitoris respectively. Bellwether had a penis and therefore focused on the perspective of pre-op and non-op trans women (those who have not had bottom surgery). She emphasized sex acts possible with flaccid ('soft') penises, associating feminizing hormone therapy–induced erectile dysfunction with pleasure rather than with a lack of sexual satisfaction. She criticized the focus of "almost all sexual discourse on penises" being "on erect penises, hard penises, penetrating penises". She also explained how trans women with penises can use strap-on dildos, which may be more pleasurable and allows trans women to decide the meaning of their body parts.

"I want to drop into your arms and be held as tight as you can hold me because I'm beautiful and special. I don't want to wonder whether you're scared to touch me, I want to know that you aren't."

— Bellwether, Fucking Trans Women #0, "Touch", p. 48

Another major focus is the innervation of trans women's bodies. Bellwether described the "thick web" of nerves spanning trans women's genital areas and showed ways to use them to bring pleasure such as stimulating the perineum. She wrote that it was important that trans women's lovers be enthusiastic about touching their bodies, rather than avoid contact out of a fear of causing offense.

Bellwether coined the term muffing to refer to the act of invaginating the scrotum and penetrating the inguinal canals, an act that Fucking Trans Women #0 is credited with popularizing. Versions include pushing the testes in and out of the inguinal canals, which Bellwether terms 'autopenetration'; pushing the testes in and then massaging the teste and the mouth of the canal; and fingering the canals without use of the testes. This masturbation technique stimulates the ilioinguinal and genitofemoral nerves. Many trans women are familiar with inserting the testes into the inguinal canals in the context of tucking, which is how Bellwether discovered the practice. (Scholar Lucie Fielding writes that Bellwether was probably not the first to have the idea. Grace Elisabeth Lavery cites Jennie June's Autobiography of an Androgyne [1918] as an early description of the same practice.)

Bellwether emphasized trans women's need to learn how their own bodies work, describing a "sexy mad science (white lab coats and leather gloves optional)" of working from data toward conclusions and addressing her readers as her "fellow genital cartographers". She rejected attempts to impute a deeper meaning to trans people's genitals, writing, "what I have between my legs is not a metaphor or an analogy but something new and wonderful" and "My body is a woman's body and part of it is my penis, a woman's penis." In the context of muffing, she referred to her inguinal canals as cunts, which Lucie Fielding in Trans Sex notes in the context of a broader phenomenon of trans people renaming their body parts. Bellwether referred to "the sensitive, fleshy tube of flesh with all the nerves and blood vessels in it" as the penis for the sake of comprehension, without claiming that it is an objectively correct term.

== Reception and impact ==
Fucking Trans Women has been highlighted by Greta R. Bauer and Rebecca Hammond in the Canadian Journal of Human Sexuality as a resource for trans sexual health and was described by Shoshanna Rosenberg et al. in Sexuality & Culture as "a comprehensive guide to trans women's sexuality". Muffing in particular has drawn attention in popular-culture sources including Playboy, Broadly, Autostraddle, and The Daily Dot; it was promoted by scholar Lucie Fielding in Jessica Stoya's sex advice column with Slate. Tobi Hill-Meyer in Autostraddle writes that "Having some familiarity with the area from tucking has led some trans women and trans fems to explore this area, and for trans women and trans fems who experience genital dysphoria, being penetrated in the front can be really meaningful." Katelyn Burns in Playboy, also emphasizing muffing as less prone to inducing dysphoria, says that Fucking Trans Women is "widely considered to be the first and most in-depth guide to having sex with pre- and non-op trans femme bodies"; Carla Pfeffer in the Journal of Homosexuality and Constance Augusta Zaber in Book Riot similarly characterize it as the first in that regard.

Fielding's Trans Sex describes a "mystification" process of seeing past the "habitual reality" of one's body and identifies as "foundational" to this Bellwether's statement in Fucking Trans Women that "The form of someone's body doesn't necessarily determine what that body means, how it works, or what it can do"; she cites this phrase further to refute the proposition that all post-op trans women will wish to engage in vaginal penetration. Ana Valens in The Daily Dot praises in particular Fucking Trans Women's criticism of phallocentrism; writing sex guides there and in Allure, she cites Bellwether in discussing the innervation of trans women's genital areas as distinct from focusing solely on the penis. In a 2022 Mary Sue article, Valens refers to Fucking Trans Women as "the gold standard in transfeminine sex and masturbation" and writes that, 12 years after it was first published, it remained "one of the best resources for transfeminine people who have penises".

Rachel Stevens of WomenWriteAboutComics praises Bellwether's message to trans women that they don't have to emulate transgender pornography; her colleague Morgan Purdy agrees and points to her "[t]otal rejection of codifying a single trans women's sexuality". Broadly's Diana Tourjée describes Fucking Trans Women as "groundbreaking" and "iconic". Using Bellwether's preferred term for her inguinal canals, she writes that the zine "helped a generation of pre or non-op trans girls reclaim their 'cunts' and find new sexual practices that supported their gendered bodies."

Autostraddle's Nadler says it was the zine that had most influenced her life and wrote,

The zine's focus on the bodies of pre- and non-op trans women, and how these bodies move in bed, was revelatory. Reading FTW provided perhaps my first glimpse into an understanding of trans women's bodies, like mine, not as incomplete projects or disturbing visions, but as always already carrying the capacity to be beautiful, the potential to be sexual and sexy.

She also notes the duality of the zine's title, which can be read either in the sense of "how to fuck trans women" or "trans women who fuck". Kai Cheng Thom in Xtra Magazine also speaks of its impact on her transition and others', writing, "FTW leapt directly into the black hole that has historically surrounded trans women's sexualities—and it shone like a guiding star. Written in Bellwether's distinctively unapologetic, funny and ferociously intelligent voice, FTW addressed trans women's pleasure on our own terms", when "mainstream society would prefer us not to have sexualities at all". Thom describes the zine as having a "mythic status", passed from one trans woman to the next as "community lore".

The zine is cited in the French essay "Te lécher jusqu'à m'étouffer, la bite des meufs et le lesbianisme" (translated as Licking You Until I Choke: Dyke Dick and Lesbianism) by Floralie Resa. She describes reading it before having sex with her first girlfriend, who was trans. Mentioning the trans activist who translated the zine into French, she writes:

How to fuck a girl, I didn't know. How to fuck a trans girl, it was even more mysterious... I had read a zine on the topic once. Fucking Trans Women, by Mira Bellwether, translated into French by Mirza-Hélène Deneuve. Mirza, I gave you ten bucks for this zine.

== Planned second issue ==
Bellwether did not claim to speak for all trans women, but rather portrayed a diversity of experiences and sought reader submissions to fill in missing pieces. She acknowledged that the acts described in the zine may not be consistent with the experiences and desires of all trans women, telling Nadler, "It isn't everybody's story, but it's my story." Fucking Trans Women #0 ends with a submission call for a next issue including anal sex, sex among trans partners, and BDSM.

At the time of her death in 2022, Bellwether still wanted to publish at least one more issue, and was frustrated by the dearth of responses to the call for submissions, despite the first issue's widespread popularity in the trans community. As a result, she advocated for dialogue within the trans community that would make it more possible for trans women to write candidly about their sex lives.
