= Perzine =

Genre of zines

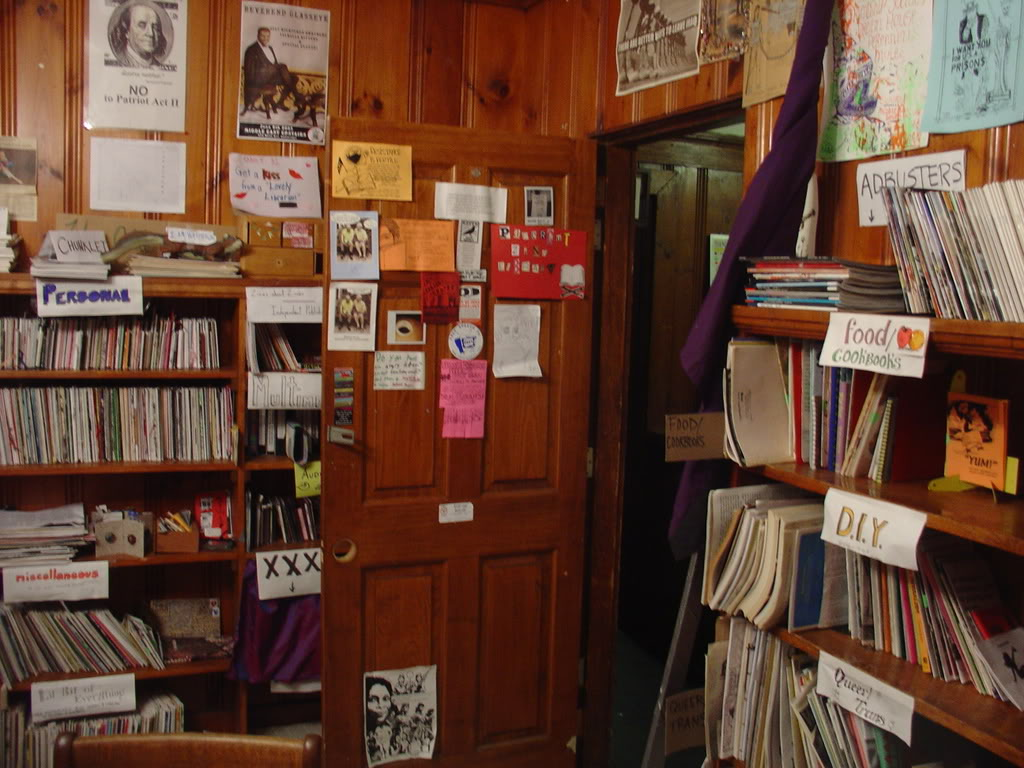
The Papercut Zine Library has zines divided by genre, including multiple shelves labeled "Personal."

Perzines are handwritten and self-published magazines with autobiographical content; the word is an abbreviation for "personal zine." Although most zines could be considered personal in that they represent the work of one person, this term describes zines that are written about one's own personal experiences, opinions and observations. Many perzines are released in multiple issues. They were generally distributed through the mail or through zine distros, with low circulation compared to traditional magazines.

It's not known what the first perzine was, but they were first discussed as a genre in the early 1990s. R. Seth Friedman began editing Factsheet 5 and separating the zine reviews there into genres; perzines was one of them.

== Format ==
There is no standard format for a perzine, but they tend to share certain characteristics. They are typically small, folded into digest or quarto size. They can be handwritten or word processed, and are typically copied on a photocopier rather than with offset printing. They generally do not have advertising other than ads for other perzines given free of cost.

In many ways, the perzine could be considered the paper predecessor to the blog. Yet for many zine creators, the paper format is still the preferred medium, despite the blog phenomenon. The paper format can be more accessible to those on the wrong side of the digital divide. They also tend to be composed over time and then completed, rather than a blog which is updated over time with many quickly composed pieces. However, the web is used as a way to distribute zines, with message boards used to announce zine releases and many zine distros running through websites.

== Examples ==
- That Girl by Kelli Williams
- Pagan's Head by Pagan Kennedy
- Cometbus by Aaron Cometbus
