= Glasgow Zine Library =

Zine library and archive in Glasgow

Coordinates: 55°50′03″N 4°15′52″W

The Glasgow Zine Library is a library, archive and community space in Glasgow, Scotland. It is the largest independent zine library in the United Kingdom, and it organises the annual Glasgow Zine Festival. The library receives over 9000 visitors each year.

== History ==
The Glasgow Zine Library began its life as a zine fair. The fair was first held in 2014 at the Old Hairdresser's, then at the Centre for Contemporary Arts. A collection of zines was accumulated through the fair, which made director LD Davis imagine a space where they could be stored and enjoyed. The Glasgow Library was thus formally created in 2018.

The Glasgow Zine Library was first funded by Creative Scotland. It has since developed with support from the Paul Hamlyn Foundation and the National Lottery Heritage Fund. £62,188 from the Heritage Fund was used to hire staff and to grow and digitise the library's collection. Glasgow City Council has also given funds to the library: £1,675 from the council contributed to the addition of an accessible toilet.

The library's first premises were at 16 Nicholson Street in the Gorbals. In 2023, it moved to 23-24 Albert Road in Govanhill.

== Collection ==
In 2025, it was reported that the library's collection comprises over 4000 zines. Zines are acquired through donation, though the library also commissions new works. In 2026, the library was the recipient of the Scots Language Publication Grant, awarded by the Scottish Book Trust, which will support the creation of a zine made in the Scots language.

Visitors are welcome to read from the collection and also contribute to it by making their own zines: zine-making materials are provided for this at the library.

== Events ==
Events organised by the Glasgow Zine Library are all free to attend or operate on a pay-what-you-can model. Examples of events include film screenings and reading groups. The programme also includes remote opportunities.

The Glasgow Zine Library also serves as a space for the local community to organise their own events.
