= Chronobiology International =

- Discipline: Chronobiology
- Language: English
- Edited by: Michael H. Smolensky

Publication details
- History: 1984-present
- Publisher: Informa Healthcare
- Frequency: Bimonthly
- Impact factor: 2.562 (2018)

Standard abbreviations
- ISO 4: Chronobiol. Int.

Indexing
- CODEN: CHBIE4
- ISSN: 0742-0528 (print); 1525-6073 (web)
- LCCN: sn84007456
- OCLC no.: 779677044

Links
- Journal homepage; Online access; Online archive

Chronobiology International is a peer-reviewed scientific journal that covers all aspects of biological and medical rhythm research, chronotherapeutics, and chronoprevention of risks. It is the official journal of the International Society for Chronobiology, the American Association for Medical Chronobiology and Chronotherapeutics, and the Society for Light Treatment and Biological Rhythms. According to the Journal Citation Reports, the journal has a current impact factor of 2.562 (2018).

As of 2021, the editor-in-chief is Dr. Roberto Refinetti.

Previous Editors-in-Chief of the journal have been:

- Dr. Michael Smolensky
- Dr. Francesco Portaluppi, University of Ferrara
- Dr. Alain Reinberg
- Dr. Yvan Touitou
