= Transgender sexuality =

Sexuality of transgender people

Sexuality in transgender individuals encompasses all the issues of sexuality of other groups, including establishing a sexual identity, learning to deal with one's sexual needs, and finding a partner, but may be complicated by issues of gender dysphoria, physical, physiological, and emotional effects of hormone replacement therapy and/or surgery, psychological aspects of expressing sexuality after medical transition, or social aspects of expressing their gender identity.

Gender identity and being transgender are distinct concepts from sexuality and sexual orientation. Sexual orientation is an individual's enduring pattern of attraction, or lack thereof, to others (being straight, lesbian, gay, bisexual, asexual, etc.), whereas gender identity is a person's innate knowledge of their own gender (being a man, woman, non-binary, etc.). Transgender people exhibit the same range of sexual orientations as the general public, but are much less likely to identify as straight. Studies of trans people in Europe, North America, and China have found that 33-53% identify as queer, pansexual, or bisexual, 18-37% identify as lesbian, gay, or same-gender-loving, 8-27% identify as straight, and 4-13% identify as asexual.

For much of the twentieth century, being transgender was understood through the lens of sexuality. Despite early advocates such as Magnus Hirschfeld promoting an understanding of sexuality and gender identity as different phenomena, the dominant view in Western psychoanalytic and medical fields was that heterosexual sexual roles were an inherent part of gender, meaning that for someone assigned male at birth, being attracted to men and identifying as a woman were both functions of the same "disorder." As standards of care for trans people were developed in the mid- to late twentieth century, sexuality played a prominent role in terms of which trans people were judged as deserving of gender-affirming care. Anyone who didn’t fit the strictly fixed, binary, and heterosexual framework of providers was denied transition care. In the early twenty-first century, after decades of advocacy by trans people, the diversity of sexuality among trans people began to be recognized within the medical field.

== Sexual orientation ==
Being transgender or gender nonconforming and having same-sex attractions are often conflated, despite being different attributes. Transgender people can have any sexual orientation. The sexual orientation terms trans people use generally correspond with their gender identity; for example, trans women exclusively attracted to other women commonly identify as lesbians, and trans men exclusively attracted to women identify as straight. Many other trans people use identity terms that don't rely on gender at all, such as queer and pansexual. Studies have found that trans people are more likely than cisgender people to use more than one sexual orientation label for themselves, showing that sexual orientation for transgender people is complex.

Confusion about the distinction between gender identity and sexual orientation makes it harder for trans people to be understood and believed about who they are, and can also make it harder for people to understand themselves as trans. Sentiments such as “if you’re attracted to women, why would you transition from male to female?” are common, and a common explanatory phrase is “gender identity is who you go to bed as; sexual orientation is who you go to bed with.” In a 2025 study, researchers found that non-heterosexual trans men with internalized heterosexism (i.e., the belief that desiring men means you’re a woman and desiring women is a prerequisite of being a man) were likely to go through a period of confusion about their gender identity.

Transgender people exhibit the same range of sexual orientations as the general public, although trans people are much more likely to be sexual minorities than cisgender people. A 2023 study found that 89% of trans respondents to a survey in thirty European countries had a sexual minority identity. A different 2023 study, published in BMC Public Health and based on a national probability sample of United States (U.S.) data, found that 82% of trans people had a sexual minority identity as compared with 10% of cisgender people.

The same study found that 21% of trans people identified as lesbian, gay, or same-gender-loving, 19% as bisexual, 18% as queer, 18% as straight/heterosexual, 12% as pansexual, 5% as asexual, and 7% as some other sexual identity. The 2015 U.S. Transgender Survey, which surveyed a much larger sample of transgender people, found that 21% identified as queer, 18% as pansexual, 16% as lesbian, gay, or same-gender-loving, 15% as straight, 14% as bisexual, and 10% as asexual.

The 2023 European study above found that 37% of trans people identified as lesbian or gay, 34% as bisexual, 11% as straight, and 18% as "other" (no other identity labels were offered as options). A 2019 survey of trans people in Canada found that 51% of respondents identified as queer, 31% as pansexual, 28% as bisexual, 18% as gay or lesbian, 13% as asexual, 8% as straight, 4% as two-spirit, and 9% as unsure or questioning (respondents could select multiple answers, and many did). A 2017 survey of trans people in China found that 33% identified as bisexual or pansexual, 27% as heterosexual, 26% as homosexual, 4% as asexual, 7% as undecided, and 4% as "other."

=== Transgender women ===
The 2015 U.S. Transgender Survey found that trans women were most likely to identify as lesbian, gay, or same-gender-loving (27%), followed by bisexual (20%), straight (19%), pansexual (16%), queer (6%), and asexual (6%). The 2023 study published in BMC Public Health found that trans women were most likely to identify as bisexual (29%), followed by straight (23%), lesbian or same-gender-loving (16%), pansexual (10%), queer (6%), asexual (4%), and "other" (7%).

=== Transgender men ===
The 2015 U.S. Transgender Survey found that trans men were most likely to identify as queer (24%) or straight (23%), followed by pansexual (17%). They were less likely to identify as lesbian, gay, or same-gender-loving (12%), bisexual (12%), or asexual (7%). The 2023 U.S. study published in BMC Public Health found that trans men were most likely to identify as straight (28%), followed by gay or same-gender-loving (20%), queer (15%), bisexual (13%), pansexual (11%), asexual (1%), and "other" (11%).

=== Non-binary people ===
The 2015 U.S. Transgender Survey found that non-binary people were most likely to identify as queer (34%), followed by pansexual (21%) and asexual (17%). They were less likely to identify as bisexual (10%), lesbian, gay, or same-gender-loving (8%), or straight (2%). The 2023 U.S. study published in BMC Public Health found that non-binary people were most likely to identify as queer (35%), followed by lesbian, gay, or same-gender-loving (21%), pansexual (16%), bisexual (13%), asexual (12%), straight (less than 1%), and "other" (3%).

A 2021 U.S. study of almost 9,000 non-binary youth ages 13-24 found that 28% identified as bisexual, 27% as pansexual, 22% as queer, 20% as lesbian or gay, 2% as questioning, and less than 1% as straight.

=== Hijra ===
Hijra of South Asia are usually feminine individuals who were assigned male at birth and are officially recognized as a third gender in a number of countries. Hijra most often partner with heterosexual or bisexual men and usually play an exclusively receptive role during sex. Some hijras are asexual, and some do not define themselves by a specific sexual orientation but rather by renouncing sexuality altogether.

== Sexual practices ==
Mira Bellwether's self-published 2010 zine Fucking Trans Women was a landmark work in its focus on the perspectives and experiences of trans women. It focused in particular on sex acts possible with flaccid penises and on the innervation of the genital areas for trans women who have not had feminizing genital surgery. It both named and popularized the act of muffing, or stimulating the inguinal canals through an invaginated scrotum, which can offer those with genital dysphoria a way to be penetrated from the front.

The quarterly magazine Original Plumbing, which ran from 2009-2019, was the first magazine for trans men made by trans men. Dedicated to the sexuality and culture of trans men, as well as representation of the full diversity among transmasculine people, the magazine presented and celebrated a wide range of sexualities. It also celebrated transmasculine people with all sorts of bodies as attractive and sexy, in stark contrast with dominant medical and media narratives of trans people.

The groundbreaking book Trans Bodies, Trans Selves, first published in 2014, offers information for trans people on health and wellness, including sexuality and sexual practices, and the many ways that trans people "leave behind cissexist, homophobic ideas about sex."

"There are as many ways to be sexual as there are people. How we have sex is not determined by our gender or sexual orientation. No matter how we identify, we choose the kinds of touch we enjoy, decide whether we enjoy penetrating or being penetrated (or both, or neither), and how we want to work and play with our partners to have satisfying, fulfilling sex lives."

=== Sexual partners ===
A 2023 study based on a national probability sample of U.S. data with a sample size of 274 transgender adults and 1,162 cisgender adults analyzed questions about respondents' sexual behavior and attractions. 72% of trans people reported having sex in the last 5 years, compared with 80% of cisgender people. Among trans respondents, 52% reported having sex with cis women, 43% with cis men, 17% with trans women, and 20% with trans men (the survey did not ask about sex with non-binary people). In terms of attraction, 74% of trans respondents said they were attracted to cis women, 58% were attracted to cis men, 52% were attracted to trans women, 60% were attracted to trans men, and 60% were attracted to non-binary people.

Among trans men, 57% reported having sex with cis women in the last 5 years, 34% reported sex with cis men, 15% reported sex with trans women, and 19% reported sex with other trans men. 75% reported being attracted to cis women, 55% were attracted to cis men, 50% were attracted to trans women, 47% were attracted to other trans men, and 56% were attracted to non-binary people. 58% of trans men reported being attracted to three or more of these gender categories.

Among trans women, 43% reported having sex with cis women in the last 5 years, 53% reported sex with cis men, 14% reported sex with other trans women, and 12% reported sex with trans men. 68% reported being attracted to cis women, 66% were attracted to cis men, 50% were attracted to other trans women, 43% were attracted to trans men, and 50% were attracted to non-binary people. 57% of trans women reported being attracted to three or more of these gender categories.

Among non-binary people, 56% reported having sex with cis women in the last 5 years, 39% reported sex with cis men, 22% reported sex with trans women, and 29% reported sex with trans men. 79% of reported being attracted to cis women, 52% were attracted to cis men, 72% were attracted to trans women, 69% were attracted to trans men, and 76% were attracted to other non-binary people. 78% of non-binary people reported being attracted to three or more of these gender categories.

=== Naming the body ===
Many transgender people use a variety of terms to refer to their genitals and other gendered body parts. While some use standard clinical and colloquial terms (e.g. penis, dick; vagina, pussy), others use replacement words when existing names conflict with their gender identity and trigger gender dysphoria.

For instance, some transfeminine people refer to their anus as a vagina, pussy, or cunt; terms for the penis include junk, strapoff, strapless, clit, and hen. Some transmasculine people refer to their clitoris as a dick, cock, or dicklet; terms for the vagina include front hole, man cave, and bonus hole.

Some trans people are less uncomfortable with their body or do not associate particular body parts with their gender assigned at birth. Ultimately, the decision of what language a trans person chooses to use for their body, and wants others to use, is up to the individual whose body is being named.^{: 355–356}

== Effects of transitioning ==
=== Effects of feminizing hormone therapy ===
Feminizing hormone therapy often results in a decrease in a person's sex drive or a change in the way arousal is experienced. A 2014 study found that 62% of trans women respondents reported a decrease in sexual desire after hormone therapy and/or vaginoplasty, and 22% felt significant distress about this to warrant a diagnosis of hypoactive sexual desire disorder (HSDD). A 2008 study reported HSDD in 34% of trans women who'd had vaginoplasties and hormone therapy, compared with 23% of a control group of cisgender women; there was no difference between the two groups' reported sexual desire.

Some trans women and healthcare providers anecdotally report the use of progestogens increasing libido. A 2009 study tested the effectiveness of two treatments for HSDD in trans women: transdermal testosterone and oral dydrogesterone (a progestin). After six weeks of treatment, the group treated with testosterone reported improved sexual desire, while the group treated with the progestin reported no change.

Feminizing hormone therapy can also stimulate the development of breast tissue, causing breasts to increase in both size and sensitivity, and it can result in decreases in erectile function, sperm count, and the size of genitalia. Some people also experience changes in the way their orgasms feel; for example, some people report the ability to experience multiple orgasms.

=== Effects of masculinizing hormone therapy ===
Masculinizing hormone therapy often results in an increase in a person's libido (sometimes suddenly and/or dramatically) or a change in the way arousal is experienced. It can also result in increased stimulation of genital tissue and the enlargement of the genitals, sometimes dramatically. Other effects can include vaginal atrophy, which can make penetrative sex more painful. People receiving masculinizing hormone therapy may be at increased risk of urinary tract infections, especially if they engage in receptive penetrative sex.

=== Effects of gender-affirming surgery ===
A 2005 U.S. study of 55 trans women and trans men found that 80% reported improvement of their sexuality, such as better sex lives and improved sexual satisfaction, after gender-affirming surgery. Before surgery, trans individuals were less enthusiastic about engaging in sexual activity due to dysphoria related to their sex organs. After gender-affirming surgery they reported being more satisfied with their bodies and experiencing less stress when participating in sexual activity. A number of studies have found that trans women and trans men report an increase in orgasms in both masturbation and sexual intercourse after gender-affirming surgery.

Trans women and transfeminine individuals who receive feminizing genital surgery must dilate in order to properly shape and form the neovagina. Sexual sensation is typically retained following surgery, and the self-reported rate of personal satisfaction with surgical results across different vaginoplasty techniques is very high.

Different masculinizing genital surgery options have different results in terms of the size, appearance, and function of the genitals. After phalloplasty, which involves constructing a penis from a skin graft, sexual sensation varies in location and intensity, but is usually preserved at least at the base of the penis. After metoidioplasty, which involves using the existing genitalia, enlarged from hormone therapy, to construct a neophallus, sexual sensation and erectile function are usually completely preserved.

=== Sexual orientation and transitioning ===
Social transition and/or medical transition sometimes, but not always, impact a person’s sexual preferences, attractions, and/or sexual orientation. Some people find that they are attracted to different people than they were before transition (e.g., a trans man who was attracted to women before transition and attracted to men after transition). Other people may experience a change in sexual orientation due to being recognized as their authentic gender (e.g., a trans woman who was perceived as straight before transition and as a lesbian after transition, even if she remained partnered with the same woman).

The topic of changes to sexual orientation in transgender people has been the subject of numerous studies, but there is no conclusive scientific evidence that medical transition causes changes in a person’s sexual orientation. Some studies, such as a 2021 European study of over 900 trans men and women, have found no direct impact of hormone replacement therapy on sexual orientation. Other studies, such as a 2005 U.S. study of 232 trans women, have found that a small percentage of trans people experience a complete change in sexual orientation after medical transition; for example, from being attracted only to women to being attracted only to men.

Still other studies have found that a majority of transgender people experience a change in their sexual attractions after social transition, such as a 2016 U.S. study that found that the majority of trans people experience a shift toward being more sexually fluid in their attractions after social transition. Similarly, a 2014 U.S. study found that 29% of trans women and trans men experienced a change in sexual orientation at various points during social or medical transition; no relationship was found between a change in sexual orientation and any particular aspect of medical transition.

For some transgender people, accepting themselves as trans leads to newfound confidence in their sexual orientation identity. A new awareness that gender isn’t binary often creates more space for sexual orientations beyond heterosexual, homosexual, and bisexual, particularly for non-binary individuals.

== History ==
=== Classifying transgender people by sexual orientation ===
For much of the nineteenth and twentieth centuries, Western cultures conflated gender nonconformity and homosexuality; as such, historical sexual orientation data for transgender people is limited. Sexologist Magnus Hirschfeld was among the first to propose, in the early twentieth century, that same-sex sexual attraction and identifying as a different gender were separate phenomena, and that trans people could be heterosexual or homosexual.

However, the rise of psychoanalytic theory, championed by Sigmund Freud, continued to conflate being trans with homosexuality. Freud believed that people who presented as trans or gender nonconforming were repressing homosexual tendencies. By the mid-twentieth century, physicians began to distinguish being trans from experiencing same-sex sexual attraction, but the conflation of these separate things persisted and many psychoanalysts opposed transition care due to their belief that individuals who desired it were homosexuals or transvestites (by which they meant heterosexual men who found cross-dressing erotic).

Early advocates for gender-affirming care such as Harry Benjamin and Robert Stoller became singularly focused on identifying "primary" or "true transsexuals" in order to determine who was deserving of access to transition care, and sexuality featured centrally in this practice. Benjamin believed that sexual desire for men post-transition and the absence of sexual desire for women pre-transition was an essential characteristic for trans women, while Stoller saw any sexual pleasure pre-transition as a sign of "inauthenticity." John Money believed that being trans was "an extreme form" of homosexuality.

In 1973 Norman Fisk introduced the term gender dysphoria to better represent the diversity of trans people, and this approach was adopted by the initial Benjamin Standards and the DSM-III (1980) when it created the new category "transsexualism." The DSM-III named four subtypes of transsexualism based on individuals' sexual history prior to transition: asexual, homosexual, heterosexual, and unspecified. In practice, trans women with no history of sexual activity and trans women who were attracted to men were considered "primary transsexuals," while trans women who were attracted to women were viewed as "secondary" by clinicians who believed them to be heterosexual men who simply enjoyed cross-dressing. Trans men, as a group, were viewed as being almost exclusively attracted to women.

For decades, anyone who didn't fit the strictly fixed, binary, and heterosexual framework of the "primary" or "true transsexual" was denied transition care. Patients at gender clinics were required to be unmarried, and expressing a desire for same-gender relationships was pathologized. In order to be approved for care, trans people had to state that after medical transition, they would be heterosexual.

Lou Sullivan, a trans man who was repeatedly denied transition care by gender clinics in the 1970s and 1980s due to his gay identity, was a central figure in efforts to create visibility and recognition for gay trans men and other non-heterosexual trans people. Researchers eventually acknowledged the existence of gay trans men, and by the end of the 20th century, Ira Pauly, a leading psychiatrist in trans issues, acknowledged that "the statement that all female-to-male transsexuals are [only attracted to women] can no longer be made." However, through the mid-2010s medical textbooks continued to suggest that most trans men were straight.

It wasn't until the early twenty-first century, after decades of advocacy by transgender people, that trans people began to be fully included in professional bodies such as WPATH, leading to advances in patient-centered care and broader understanding within the medical field of the diversity of trans experience, including the diversity of sexual orientation among trans people.

== See also ==
- Attraction to transgender people
- Lou Sullivan
- Transgender health care
- Trans Bodies, Trans Selves
- Transgender sex workers
- Autogynephilia
- Outline of transgender topics
