= SCAM (zine) =

SCAM is a zine produced by Erica Lyle (a.k.a. "Iggy Scam"), launched in 1991. The zine covers punk rock culture and grassroots activism in various locations, including Miami, San Francisco, Buenos Aires, Los Angeles, and New York City. In early issues, the zine explored squatting, dumpster diving, train hopping, and volunteering with needle exchange programs and Food Not Bombs. Furthermore, the zine explained "scams" to readers, so that they could attain items or benefits for free.

Lyle started the zine as a teenager, after fleeing a violent home situation in Palm Beach County. She moved into a Ft. Lauderdale punk house, where she was introduced to a zine called Get Loose. This zine helped inspired Lyle to create her own zine. Early issues of SCAM focused on topics such as freighthopping, generator shows, wheatpasting, selling plasma, and returning stolen merchandise. For contemporary audiences, many of the scams detailed in the zine are no longer relevant. However, the zine is understood to be a source of inspiration and creative resistance for many readers. It is particularly known for documenting a life that aims to "...resist capitalism and have fun AND have a sense of humour at the same time," according to Microcosm Publishing.

Over time, the zine became more political. In 2008, Lyle produced an issue that focused on street art and activism in Buenos Aires, Argentina. In 2010, SCAM examined Art Basel, juxtaposing the elite art world with the tent cities of Miami. In 2011, SCAM focused on Black Flag and the Los Angeles punk scene. In 2016, Lyle produced a twenty-fifth anniversary issue, which included interviews with Barry McGee, Danny Lyon, Rebecca Giordano, and others.

Lyle explained in an interview, "The magazine started as a way to document the life my friends and I were leading as teenagers, which was getting everything for free [through scams, stealing, and resource-sharing]. But it was also a way to participate in and broaden my community. As I got older, my interests changed. I became less interested specifically in punk and more involved in activism, and I started doing other self-publishing projects for a broader audience. SCAM is sort of morphing into more longform, underground journalism, where I try to cover things outside of the mainstream but in a really careful and thoughtful way."

In 2010, Microcosm Publishing printed Scam: The First Four Issues. In 2019, Lyle joined the band Bikini Kill as a guitarist. She discussed SCAM in interviews, and she stated that an eleventh issue was in development.
