= Canadian Journal of Human Sexuality =

The Canadian Journal of Human Sexuality
- Discipline: Sexology
- Language: English

Publication details
- History: 1992–present
- Publisher: University of Toronto Press (Canada)
- Frequency: Quarterly

Standard abbreviations
- ISO 4: Can. J. Hum. Sex.

Indexing
- ISSN: 1188-4517
- OCLC no.: 53880937

Links
- Journal homepage

The Canadian Journal of Human Sexuality (CJHS) is a peer-reviewed, scholarly journal focusing on the medical, psychological, social, and educational aspects of human sexuality. It is the official journal of the Sex Information and Education Council of Canada (SIECAN). The editor-in-chief of CJHS is Terry Humphreys. CJHS is published by University of Toronto Press.
