= Cindy Crabb =

American author, musician, and feminist (born 1970)

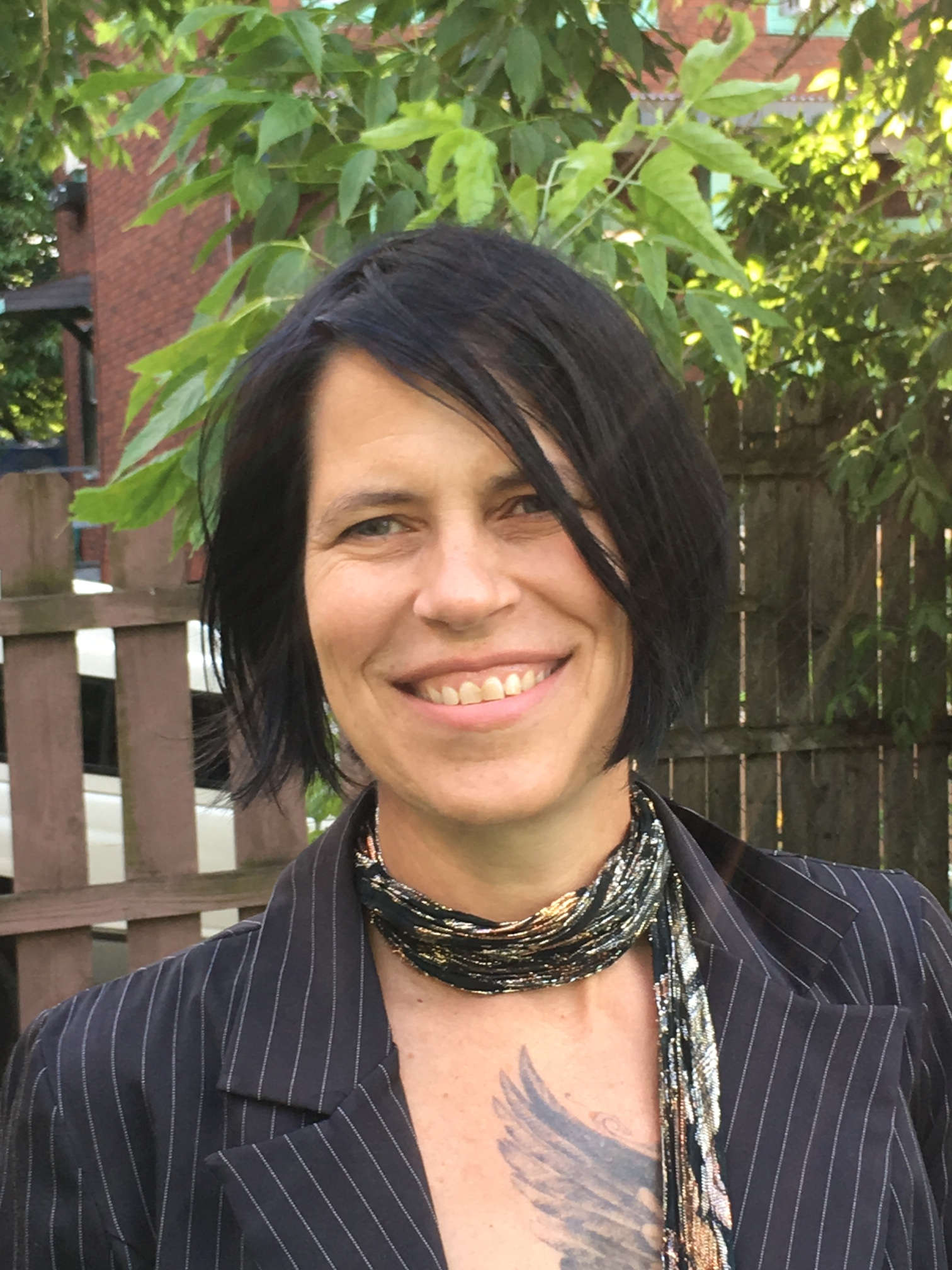
- Crabb in June 2017
- Born: Cynthia Alexander Crabb; February 19, 1970 (age 56); Minneapolis, Minnesota, U.S.
- Education: Ohio University
- Occupations: Clinical mental health counselor; somatic experiencing practitioner
- Writing career
- Notable works: Encyclopedia of Doris, Doris zine
- Website: cindycrabb.com

Cindy Crabb (born February 19, 1970) is an American author, musician, and feminist. Her zine, Doris, played a central role in the 1990s girl zine movement associated with third wave feminism. Doris drew attention for its frank, personal exploration of topics, such as sexual assault, consent, abortion, addiction, queer identity, intentional communities, death of family members, among other topics. Crabb continues to publish and self-publish while also running an on-line zine distro that highlights feminist and personal zines by various authors.

== Early life ==
Crabb was born in Minneapolis, Minnesota. She described her early home life as a difficult one, in which she experienced abuse and financial hardship. She first attended an alternative school, which she liked, but she later moved to a public school in the sixth grade, which was "...a huge, terrible change." When she was seventeen years old, Crabb enrolled in a Women's studies class. During this time, "...I started retreating from society and dealing with some abuse stuff." Some of her friends participated in heated protests against United States intervention in Central America. She did not attend the protests, but the brutal experiences of her friends left an impression on her. She then moved to Plainfield, Vermont, where she worked at the Institute for social ecology and lived for three years. During this period, she began to explore anarchism in her personal studies.

Following her time in Vermont, Crabb moved Portland, Oregon. She joined the local chapter of Food Not Bombs, after seeing a listing in the local paper that stated some people were interested in starting a local chapter. She lived in a communal house during this period. However, she left the communal house after a falling out.

== Doris zine ==
In 1993, Crabb moved to Berkeley, California, and began creating her zine ‘Doris’ in this period. She was inspired by Miranda July and Johanna Fateman’s zine Snarla. She was particularly interested in secrets, and her zine had a journal-like, confessional quality. As she explained in an interview,

"When I started Doris, I was obsessed with secrets. I felt like everything was secret inside of me pretty much. I definitely had concrete secrets about abuse, about family, and about abusive situations I put myself in, and also feeling crazy. I was very afraid of going crazy. I also had secrets about how beautiful I thought things were. A lot of my friends were very tough and thought everything was disgusting capitalism. And I thought, 'But look at all this beautiful stuff just laying around in hidden places,' and that was secret too. The main reason I started writing zines was because I was obsessed with how alienated people were. Why did we just talk about music and tattoos, or Foucault? I wanted to break the barriers of what you could talk about. In the beginning I wanted to learn to write about political stuff. And then I stopped caring as much about that."

Crabb became close friends with the Cometbus zine editor, Aaron Elliott, and was later to form the bands Astrid Oto and The Blank Fight with Elliott.

Her diaries, papers, and website are archived at the Radcliffe Institute for Advanced Study at Harvard's Arthur and Elizabeth Schlesinger Library on the History of Women in America.

== Bibliography ==
=== Books and articles ===
- "How Jane Helped 11,000 Women Get Abortions When the Procedure Was Outlawed." Teen Vogue (2017).
- Learning Good Consent: On Healthy Relationships and Survivor Support, (editor) AK Press (2016).
- "Feminism…Anarchism…Anarchafeminism" (comic) in Perspectives on Anarchist Theory No. 29 IAS Press (2016).
- "Healthy Relationships" (essay) in Stay Solid! A Radical Handbook for Youth, AK Press (2013).
- Doris No. 6 (excerpt) in The Riot Grrrl Collection. The Feminist Press (2013).
- Encyclopedia of Doris, Doris Press (2011).
- Piepmeier, Alison. Girl Zines: Making Media, Doing Feminism. (Featured/Interviewed) NYU Press (2008).
- "The Chain Reaction of Unsilencing" (essay) in We Don't Need Another Wave. Seal Press (2006).
- Doris: An Anthology, Microcosm Press (2005).
- Kushner, Eve. Experiencing Abortion: A Weaving of Women’s Worlds. (Interviewed). Routledge Press (1997).
- Green, Karen & Taormino, Tristan (eds.). Girls Guide to Taking Over the World. (essay) St. Martins Press (1997).

=== Zines ===
- Doris (1993–present).
- Masculinities: Interviews (2016).
- Filling the Void: Interviews on Quitting Drinking and Using (2015).
- Learning Good Consent (2008).
- Support (2005).

== Bands ==
- Snarlas
- The Blank Fight
- Astrid Oto
