= Biological Rhythm Research =

- Discipline: Biology
- Language: English
- Edited by: W. J. Rietveld, A. A. Putilov, and D. Weinert

Publication details
- Former name: Journal of Interdisciplinary Cycle Research
- History: 1970–present
- Publisher: Taylor and Francis (United Kingdom)
- Frequency: Bimonthly

Standard abbreviations
- ISO 4: Biol. Rhythm Res.

Indexing
- ISSN: 0929-1016 (print); 1744-4179 (web)

Links
- Journal homepage

Biological Rhythm Research is a peer-reviewed academic journal that publishes articles about research into the broad topic of biological rhythms. The areas covered range from studies at the genetic or molecular level to those of behavioural or clinical topics involving ultradian, circadian, infradian, or annual rhythms. The journal publishes original scientific research papers, review papers, short notes on research in progress, book reviews and summaries of activities, symposia and congresses of national and international organizations dealing with rhythmic phenomena. The current editors are W. J. Rietveld, A. A. Putilov, and D. Weinert.

The journal was named Journal of Interdisciplinary Cycle Research from 1970 to 1993. It has been named Biological Rhythm Research since 1994. It is abstracted/indexed in Biological Abstracts, BIOSIS Previews, CAB International, Chemical Abstracts, Current Contents, EMBASE/Excerpta Medica, Ergonomics Abstracts, GEOBASE/Geo Abstracts, Psychological Abstracts, PsychoINFO, PsychoLIT, Science Citation Index, SCOPUS, Wildlife Review, and Zoological Record. The journal's SCOPUS Cite Score is 0.805.
