= Gowanus Batcave =

Historic power station in Brooklyn, New York

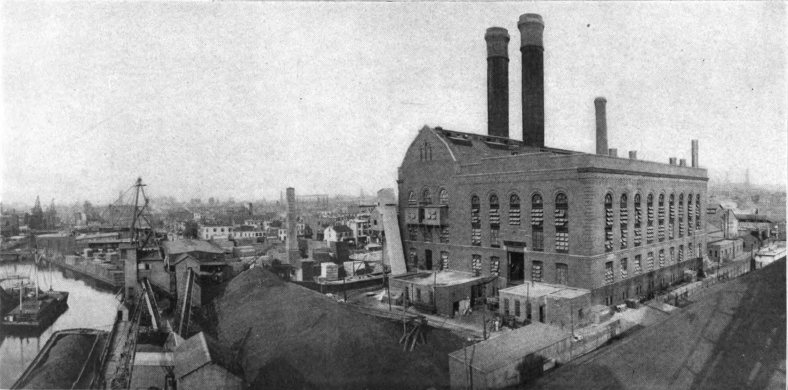
- The Central Power Station and Gowanus Canal shortly after completion

General information
- Location: 153 2nd Street, Brooklyn, New York, United States
- Coordinates: 40.6766°N 73.9888°W
- Completed: 1903; 123 years ago

Website
- www.powerhousearts.org

The Central Power Station of the Brooklyn Rapid Transit Company building, commonly known as the Batcave or Gowanus Batcave, is a former transit power station at 153 Second Street in Gowanus, Brooklyn, New York City by the Gowanus Canal. It was built between 1901 and 1904, while the Brooklyn Rapid Transit Company was expanding its rapid transit and streetcar service. It stopped operating in 1972 and sat abandoned for more than two decades, becoming home to a community of squatters in the early 2000s. The owners, who were planning to redevelop the site, building condominiums called "Gowanus Village", had the squatters removed and increased security in 2006. The Gowanus Village plans did not materialize and after a short time it became a popular space for graffiti and underground events.

In 2012, philanthropist Joshua Rechnitz purchased the property for $7 million with plans to turn it into The Powerhouse Workshop, an arts space focused on the fabrication of artistic goods. It is managed through the nonprofit Powerhouse Environmental Arts Foundation. In 2019, the New York City Landmarks Preservation Commission designated the Gowanus Batcave as an official city landmark. The arts space reopened in 2023 as Powerhouse Arts.

== Early history and construction ==
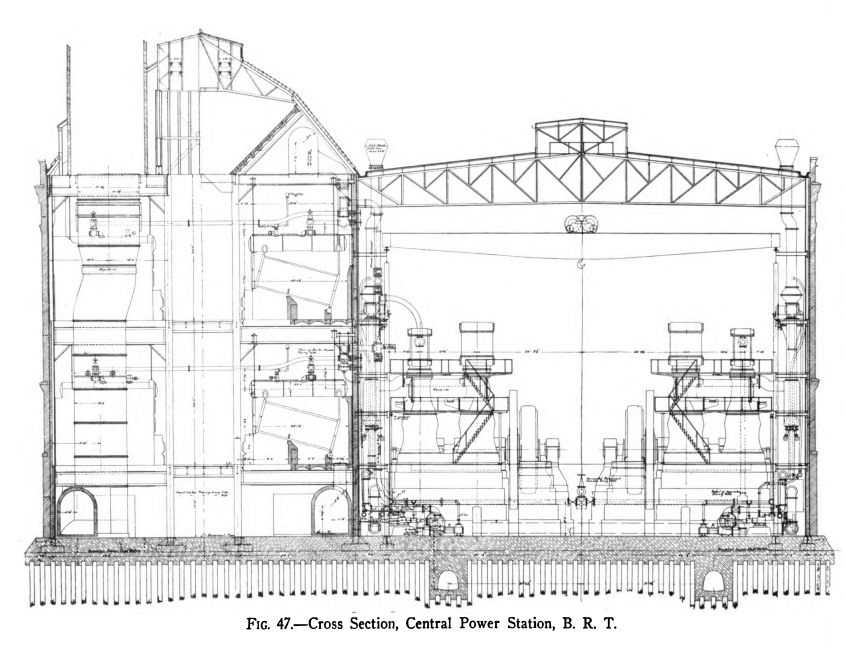
Architectural drawing showing a cross-section of the building

A Sanborn map from 1886 shows the site had been home to Nassau Sulfur Works and Smith and Shaw Mattress Materials and Paper Stock. In the late 19th century, as the Brooklyn Rapid Transit Company (BRT) expanded, increased demand was placed on its power supply. In the time before the Central Power Station was constructed, the system had been operated entirely by direct current, with boosters used where long distances required them. As territory grew to be farther and farther away from the power stations, and as the company looked for ways to increase flexibility to adapt to future growth, it was decided that the best way to increase power capacity was to adopt a new system which would allow them to use large, single stations in central locations with convenient access to coal and water. Alternating current could be distributed without excessive loss to any part of the system, and the high-tension feeders underground removed the need to string heavy overhead cables.

The need for a new power house was emphasized when a power station in Ridgewood, Queens, burned down on December 4, 1900. The following month, The Brooklyn Daily Eagle reported that a site had been found on the Gowanus Canal, an active industrial hub in South Brooklyn. The site, located at Third Avenue and First Street, had easy access to coal, water, and other supplies. It was large enough to hold a new building and a large store of coal while also allowing for future expansion.

Construction was overseen by Charles Edward Roehl. Work on the building's foundations began in May 1901 and was finished the following January, though further work was delayed by equipment shortages and labor strikes. At the time, it was estimated that the Central Power House would cost $3 million. The brick facade of the building was erected in 1902. Construction was completed in 1903, and the first engine started operating that March. Four engines were operational by June 1903, and by the following year, the structure was declared "practically completed", with all eight engines working.

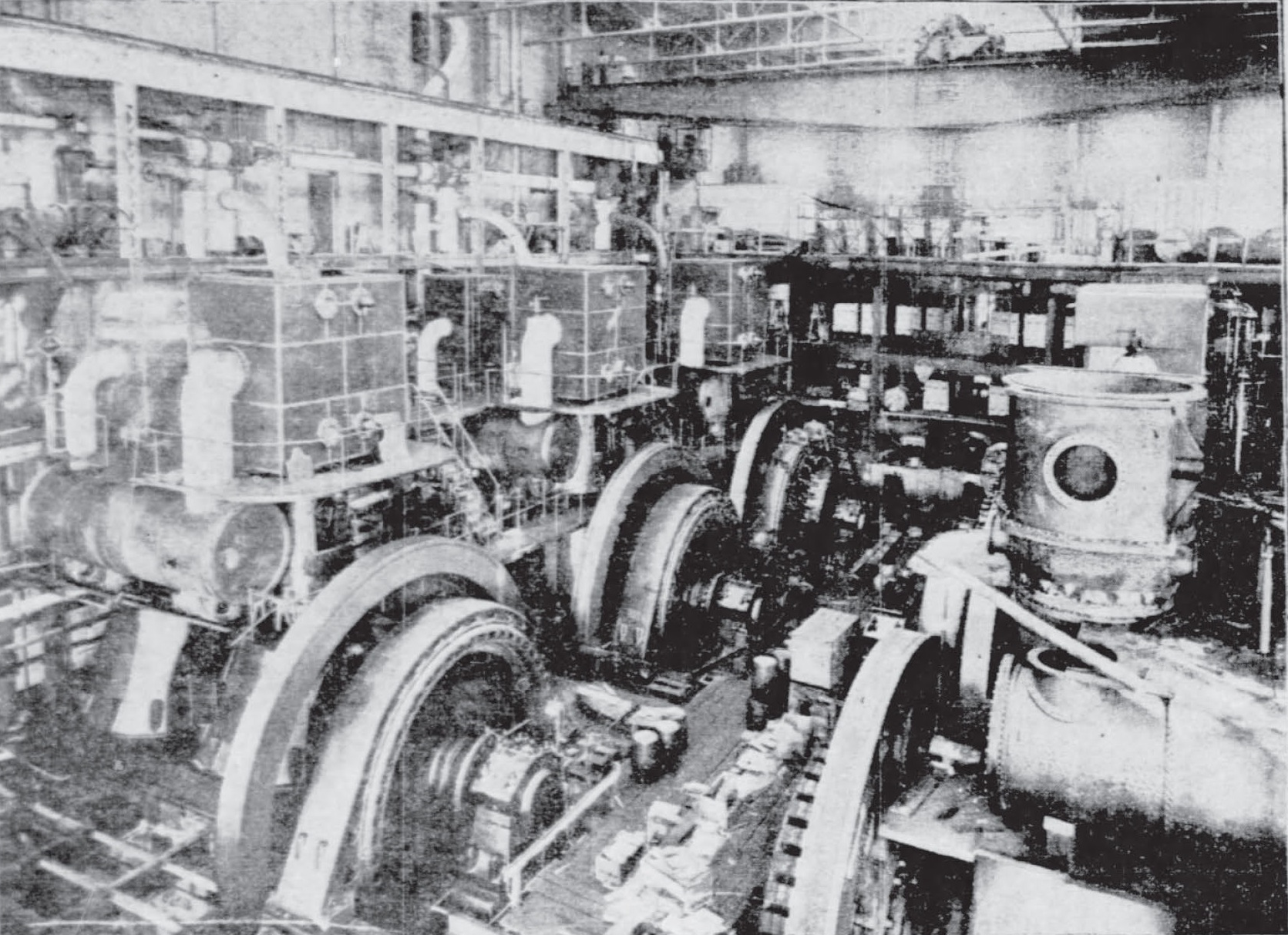
Rows of dynamos in Central Power Station, during construction

The Central Power Station's design, which combines elements of Romanesque Revival and classical styles, may have been created by Thomas E. Murray, but there is little definitive evidence in contemporary media. The building is made of red brick with bluestone trimmings, atop piles surmounted by a concrete bed about 6 feet (1.8 m) thick. Its layout was divided into two portions: the southern portion used for the engine and dynamo room, and the northern portion, the boiler house, which was considerably higher and contained two stories of boilers with coal storage above. The front, on Third Avenue, is 183 feet 3 inches (55.85 m) long, and the depth of the building 186 feet 9 inches (56.92 m), although the part which was occupied by boilers is 20 feet (6.1 m) shorter. The roof over the operating and boiler rooms was filled in between the T-irons with 3 by 12 by 24 inches (76 by 305 by 610 mm) hard-burned terracotta roofing tile laid in Portland cement, covered with a slag and cement roofing. The letters brooklyn rapid transit company were inscribed on the side of the boiler building.

Coal was brought to the plant on barges via the adjacent canal. Conveyors moved the coal to be crushed and then to the coal storage in the upper part of the boiler house, to be dropped down to the boilers as needed. To facilitate additional coal storage, the owners purchased an additional lot in 1903. In the other building, eight 4,000 horsepower engines produced both alternating and direct current via different sets of generators. The direct current was used to power nearby train lines while the alternating current was sent through underground cables in terracotta ducts to substations around the city, which would in turn convert it to direct current.

The BRT became the Brooklyn–Manhattan Transit Corporation (BMT) in 1923 after going bankrupt in the wake of the Malbone Street Wreck. In 1939, shortly before the New York City Board of Transportation was dissolved and the BMT Fifth Avenue Line was demolished, the Central Power Station was renumbered as substation #25. After being renumbered, it took alternating current from the Williamsburg Power House, turning it into direct current. In the 1950s, the boiler house was demolished. The engine house supplied power to the New York City Subway's Fourth Avenue Line, formerly operated by the BMT, until 1972 when the New York City Transit Authority sold it to the government of New York City.

== Abandonment ==
=== Squatter community ===
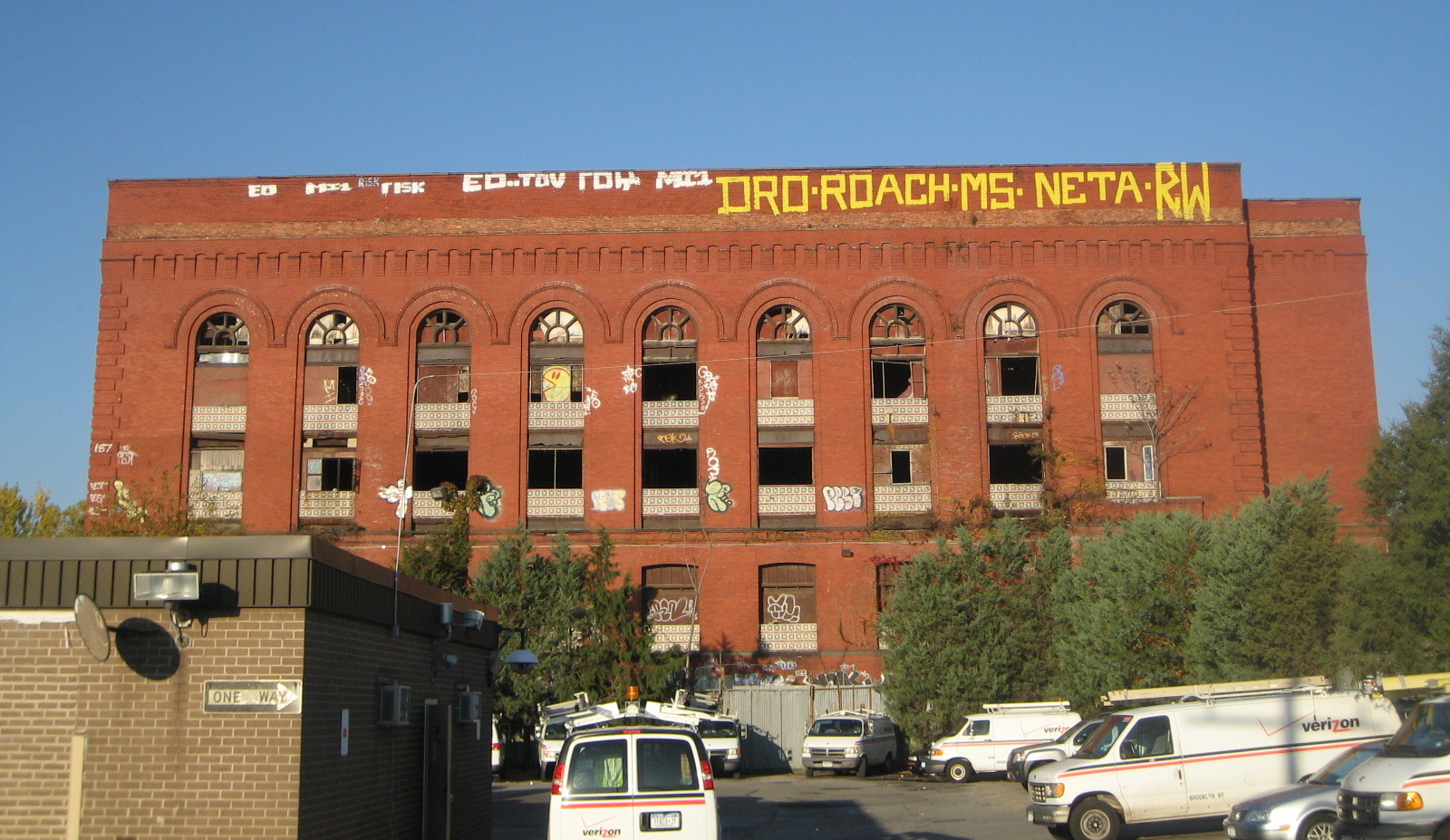
The Gowanus Batcave in 2007

The Batcave became home to squatters in the early 2000s. One of the first squatters, Zach Edminster, said he and a small group began staying there starting in 2001. While only a few people stayed there at first, the size of the group quickly began to grow, comprising mainly homeless and runaway teenagers. A community formed, setting rules for conduct including disallowing hard drug use, and organizing tasks like composting and waste disposal. They set up toilets that operated with rainwater and ran a power line from the Carroll Street Bridge to power a refrigerator and television. Around this time, within the squatting community and then among other locals, the building had begun to be known as the Batcave, named either for bats claimed to have once lived there, or, according to one of the squatters, "because that seemed to have an appropriate amount of moral ambiguity".

In 2004, several other squats around the city were torn down or otherwise cleared out, increasing the number of people coming to the Batcave, which led to diminishing of the community spirit. In 2006, the New York Daily News ran a sensational article about the space, characterizing it as violent, drug-addled, and dangerous. The reporter talked with people in their teens and twenties who told stories of doing drugs, panhandling, a homeless person thrown out a window, and an addict who overdosed and was left on the street for police to find. The property owners—Shaya Boymelgreen, Isaac Katan, and Africa-Israel Investments, who purchased the structure in the 2000s—had plans to build a large condominium project called Gowanus Village on the land occupied by the building and adjacent lots. In preparation for this project, they had building security improved, doors welded shut, and hired a guard to keep the building clear. Architectural Digest described the unused, post-squatter building "an emblem of gentrification, urban development, and street art".

=== Underground arts and urban exploration ===
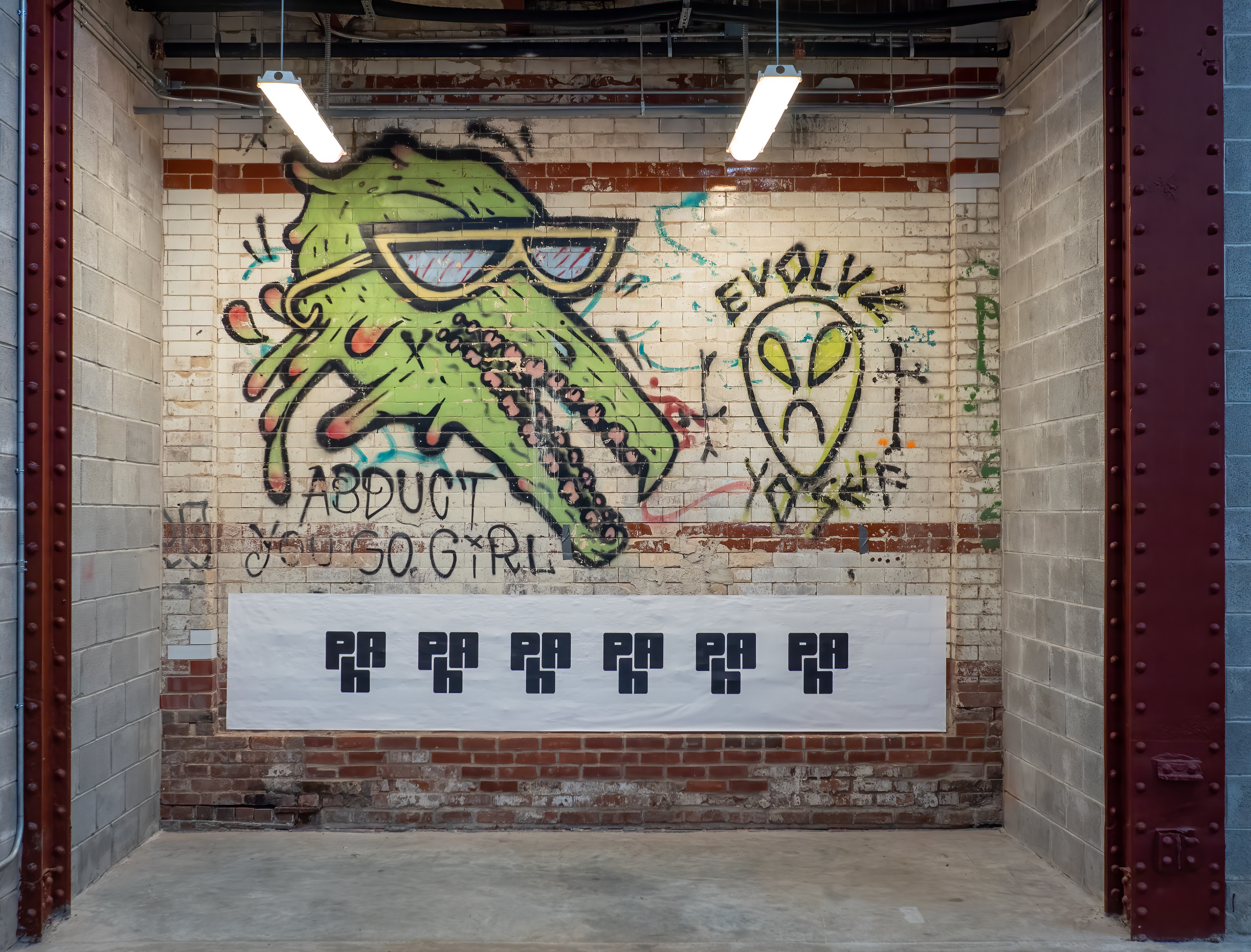
Much of the graffiti on the building's original walls was preserved by Powerhouse Arts.

As the Gowanus Village development plan failed to come to fruition, security again became lax. The Batcave became a popular location for graffiti artists, underground parties, concerts, and urban explorers in the late 2000s and early 2010s. The top of the building, facing 3rd Avenue, has displayed a variety of politically oriented messages painted by artists. In 2008, owners Africa-Israel and Katan, who had ended their relationship with Boymelgreen, put the building on the market for $27 million. The following year they updated the listing to say "make an offer", and eventually sold it in 2012 for $7 million. Even after the sale, people snuck in for parties, cutting through fences and prompting the new owners to once again tighten security.

== Powerhouse Arts ==
In 2012, the Powerhouse Environmental Arts Foundation, a nonprofit founded by philanthropist Joshua Rechnitz, purchased the property for $7 million, with initial plans to turn it into studio space for artists. For a few years after the purchase, Rechnitz and associates discussed the future of the building with local artists, discovering a greater need for a space focused on the production and fabrication of art rather than studio space. Under the name Powerhouse Workshop, it is planned to include space and equipment for woodworking, metalworking, ceramics, printmaking, and fiber arts, as well as exhibition space. It cost Rechnitz's organization $16 million to conduct pollution remediation at the site.

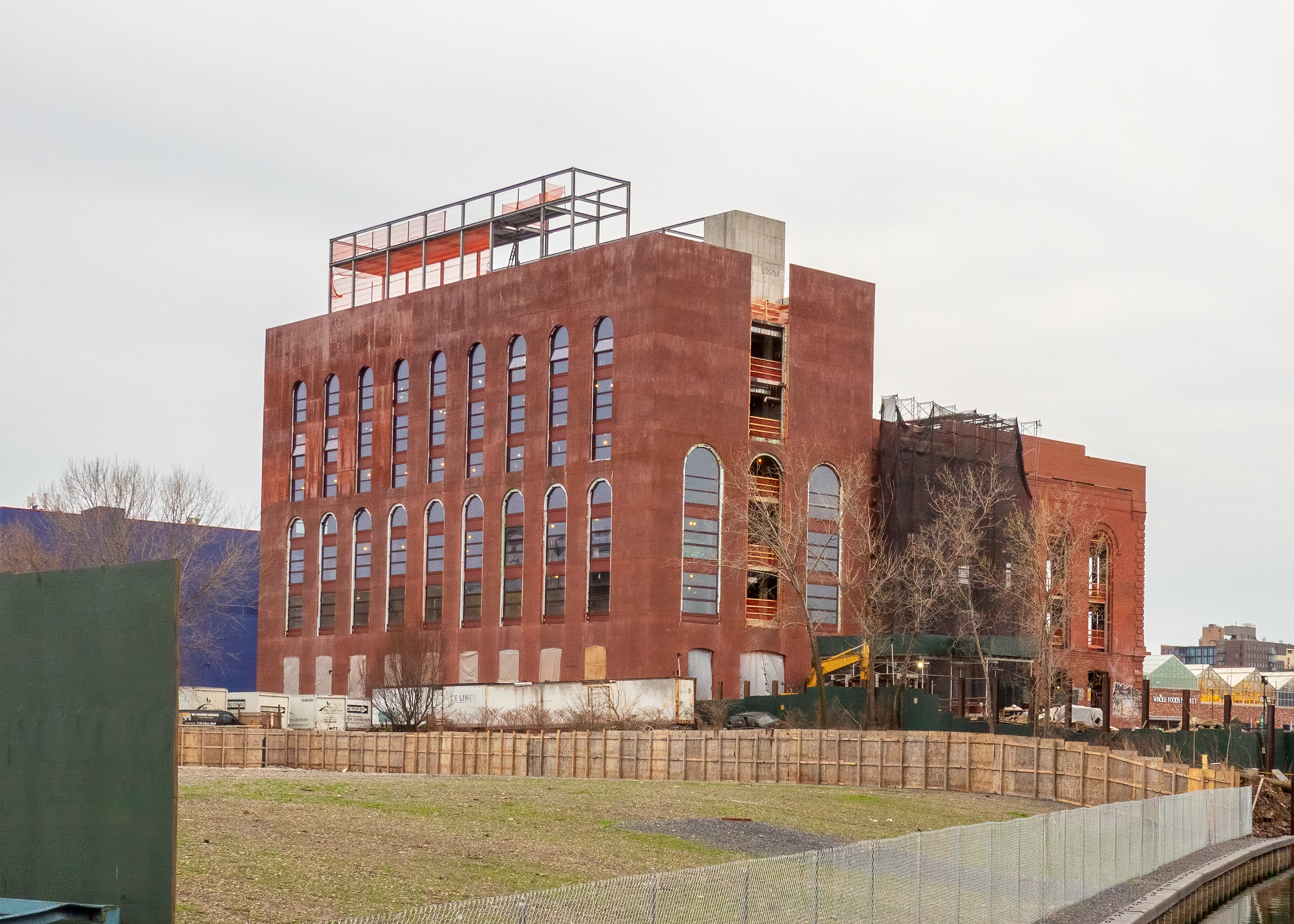
Rear view in March 2021, with newly built 6-story addition visible

Pritzker Prize-winning Swiss architecture firm Herzog & de Meuron led the renovation. The executive architects on the project are adaptive reuse and preservation experts, PBDW Architects (Platt Byard Dovell White Architects). Herzog & de Meuron was known for many high-profile projects in New York and internationally, including creating spaces for the arts like the Tate Modern in London, also built in a former power station. This was the second collaboration between the two architecture firms; they had also restored and redesigned the Park Avenue Armory. The firm planned a six-story addition on the site of the former boiler house, increasing the building's square footage from 73,958 to 143,041 square feet (6,870.9 to 13,288.9 m^{2}). 24/7 security, safety railings, and other security and safety measures were put in place in preparation for redevelopment, but the building itself will remain standing and architects and developers agreed to try to preserve as much of the graffiti on the interior as possible.

An environmental assessment found high levels of polychlorinated biphenyls (PCB) contamination, as well as other environmental issues which would require cleanup. When the remediation was certified by the New York State Department of Environmental Conservation in January 2018, the material removed included 8,375 tons of PCB-contaminated soil and 4,700 gallons of PCB-contaminated oil. In October 2019, in advance of the planned rezoning of the area around the Gowanus Canal, the New York City Landmarks Preservation Commission designated the Gowanus Batcave and four other structures as official city landmarks.

Powerhouse Workshop was originally planned to open in 2020, but as of April 2020, the opening date had been pushed to 2021. Powerhouse Arts opened within the Gowanus Batcave in May 2023. During the project, workers had to remove massive amounts of groundwater and treat the heavily polluted soil under the building's site. In addition, though the contractors wanted to preserve the building's graffiti, much of the graffiti had to be painted over while the facade was restored. The renovation included a new roof and new concrete floor plates, and a new lobby and eastern entrance was built. The engine house was converted into the Great Hall, with a grand staircase. Two additional spaces, the Loft and the Small Hall, were constructed in a neighboring annex. The six-story annex was designed in a similar style to the original power house. A ceramic studio was also added to the top story, while a printmaking, art fabrication, and metalwork studios were opened on the lower stories; these workshops occupy about half of the building, which covers 170,000 square feet (16,000 m^{2}). The project cost an estimated $180 million in total.

== See also ==
- List of museums and cultural institutions in New York City
- List of New York City Designated Landmarks in Brooklyn
