= Journal of Thermal Biology =

- Discipline: Biology
- Language: English
- Edited by: Christopher J. Gordon; Hans-Otto Poertner

Publication details
- History: 1975–present
- Publisher: Elsevier (The Netherlands)
- Frequency: 8 issues per year
- Impact factor: 3.2 (2025)

Standard abbreviations
- ISO 4: J. Therm. Biol.

Indexing
- ISSN: 0306-4565

Links
- Journal homepage

The Journal of Thermal Biology is a peer-reviewed academic journal that publishes articles that advance knowledge about the ways and mechanisms through which temperature affects humans and animals. Topics of interest include behavioral and autonomic regulation of body temperature; mechanisms involved in acclimation, acclimatization and evolutionary adaptation to temperature; mechanisms underlying the patterns of hibernation, torpor, dormancy, estivation and diapause; and medical applications of hypo- and hyperthermia. The journal publishes both original research articles and review articles. The current editors are Christopher J. Gordon and Hans-Otto Poertner.

The journal is abstracted/indexed in EMBiology, BIOSIS, Cambridge Scientific Abstracts, Current Contents, EMBASE, INSPEC, SCOPUS, and other indexing agencies.
