= Zine =

Collection of self-published work reproduced by photocopying

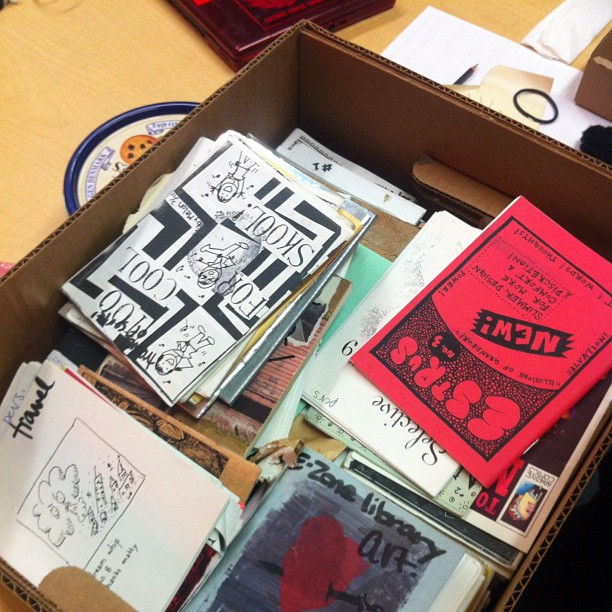
A box of zines

A zine (/ziːn/ ZEEN; short for magazine or fanzine) is a magazine that is a "noncommercial often homemade or online publication usually devoted to specialized and often unconventional subject matter". Zines are the product of either a single person or of a very small group, and are popularly photocopied into physical prints for circulation. A fanzine (blend of fan and magazine) is a non-professional and non-official publication produced by enthusiasts of a particular cultural phenomenon (such as a literary or musical genre) for the pleasure of others who share their interest.

Zines are popularly defined within a circulation of 1,000 or fewer copies; in practice, however, many are produced in editions of fewer than 100. Among the various intentions for creation and publication are developing one's identity, sharing a niche skill or art, or developing a story, as opposed to seeking profit. Zines have served as a significant medium of communication in various subcultures, and frequently draw inspiration from a "do-it-yourself" philosophy that disregards the traditional conventions of professional design and publishing houses, proposing an alternative, confident, and self-aware contribution.

Historically, zines have provided community for socially isolated individuals or groups through the ability to express and pursue common ideas and subjects. For this reason, zines have cultural and academic value as tangible traces of marginal communities, many of which are otherwise little-documented. Zines present groups that have been dismissed with an opportunity to voice their opinion, both with other members of their own communities or with a larger audience. Zines have also served as ways to involve heavily censored populations in active political life. This has been reflected in the creation of zine archives and related programming in such mainstream institutions as the Tate museum and the British Library.

Written in a variety of formats from desktop-published text to comics, collages and stories, zines cover broad topics including fanfiction, politics, poetry, art & design, ephemera, personal journals, social theory, intersectional feminism, single-topic obsession, or sexual content far enough outside the mainstream to be prohibitive of inclusion in more traditional media. Various subsets of zines include specific formats such as fanzines and perzines, and specific topics such as science-fiction fanzines or punk zines.

== History ==
=== Overview and origins ===
Dissident, under-represented, and marginalized groups have published their own opinions in leaflet and pamphlet form for as long as such technology has been available. The concept of zines can be traced to the amateur press movement of the late 19th and early 20th century. This intersects with literary magazines during the Harlem Renaissance, as well as the subculture of science fiction fandom in the 1930s. The popular graphic-style associated with zines is influenced artistically and politically by the subcultures of Dada, Fluxus, Surrealism, and Situationism.

Many trace zines' lineage from as far back as Thomas Paine's exceptionally popular 1776 pamphlet Common Sense, Benjamin Franklin's Poor Richard's Almanack, and The Dial (1840–44) by Margaret Fuller and Ralph Waldo Emerson.

=== 1920s ===
==== "Little magazines" during the Harlem Renaissance ====
In the 1920s during the Harlem Renaissance, a group of Black creatives in Harlem began a literary magazine "the better to express ourselves freely and independently – without interference from old heads, white or Negro." This led to the creation of a "little magazine" entitled Fire!!. Only one issue of Fire!! was released, but this inspired the creation of other "little magazines" by Black authors. Contributions by Black writers, artists, and activists to the zine movement are often overlooked, in part "because they had such short runs and were spearheaded by a single or small group of individuals."

=== 1930s–1960s and science fiction ===
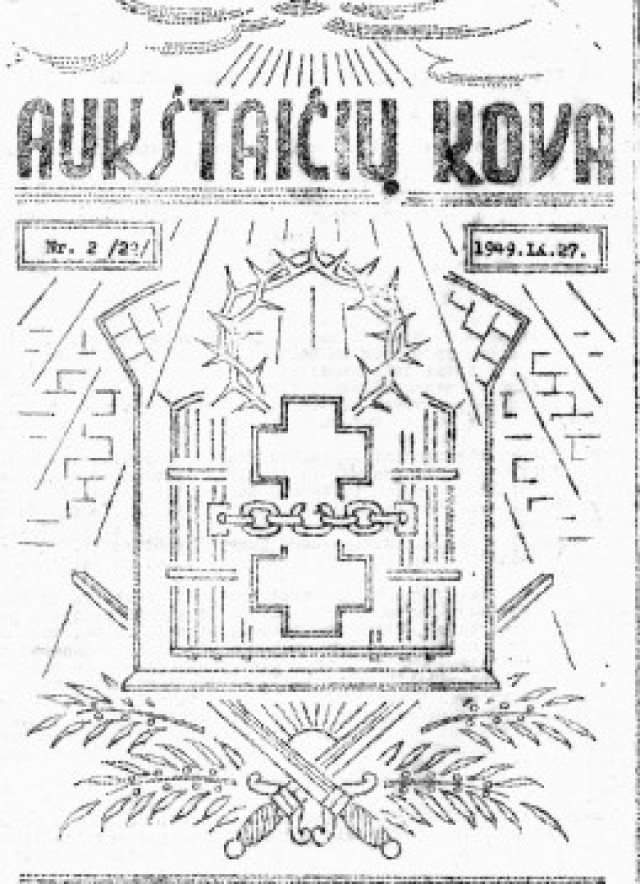
Aukštaičių kova (The Fight of Aukštaitians) - a zine published by the Lithuanian partisans, 1949

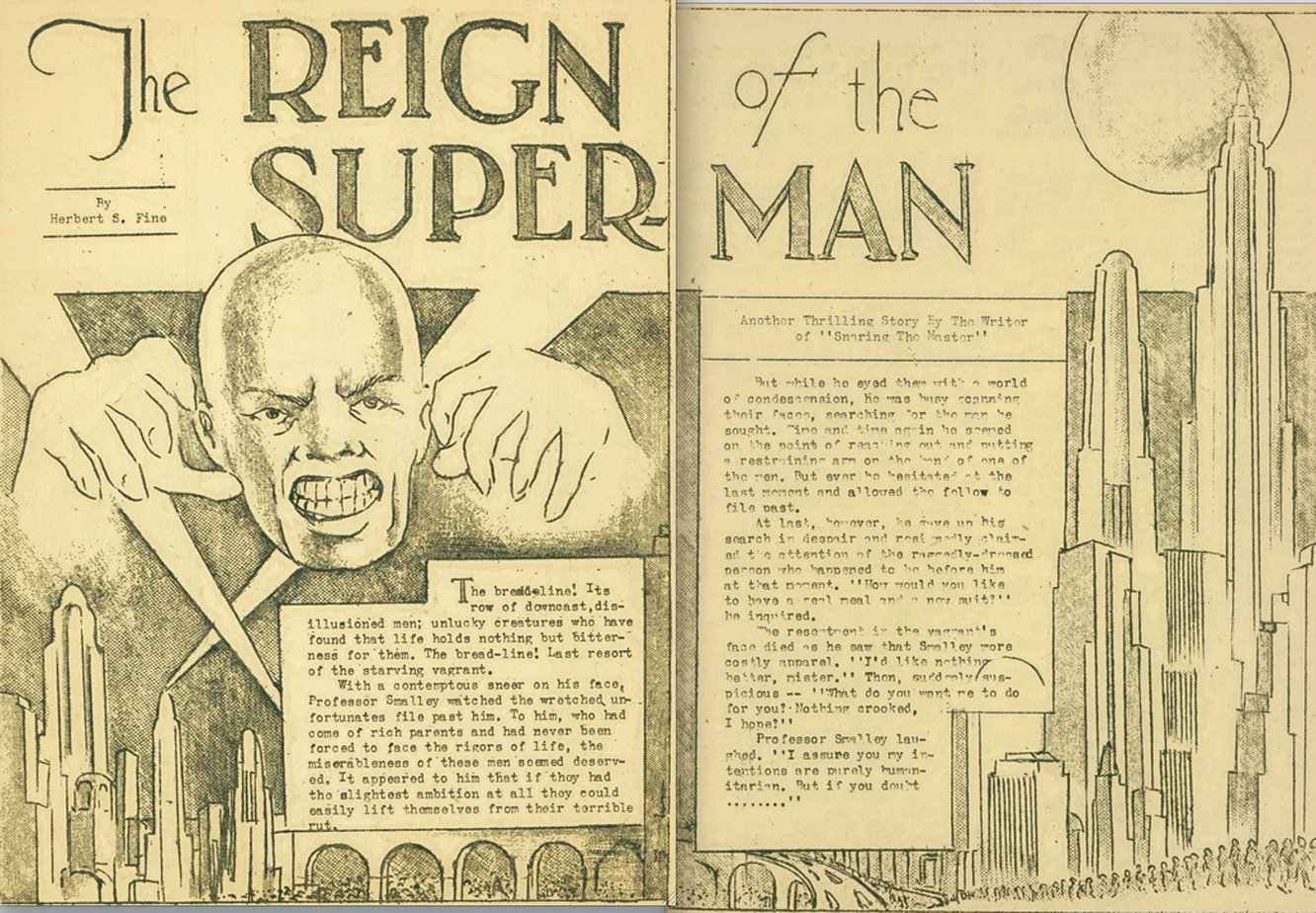
"The Reign of the Superman", a short story from the 1933 zine Science Fiction: The Advance Guard of Future Civilization, which led to the creation of the comic book hero Superman.

During and after the Great Depression, editors of pulp science fiction magazines became increasingly frustrated with letters detailing the impossibilities of their science fiction stories. Over time they began to publish overly-scrutinizing letters, complete with their return addresses. Hugo Gernsback published the first science fiction magazine, Amazing Stories in 1926. In January 1927, Gernsback introduced a large letter column which printed reader's addresses, allowing them to write to each other; it was out of this mailing list that fans' own science-fiction fanzines began.

The Comet is frequently cited as the first science-fiction fanzine. It was published in 1930 by the Chicago chapter of the Science Correspondence Club and edited by Raymond A. Palmer and Walter Dennis.

The term "fanzine" was coined in 1940 by Russ Chauvenet in his own fanzine, Detours. Chauvenet argued it was "the best short form of 'fan-magazine'." The term entered the Oxford English Dictionary as part of A Supplement to the OED, Volume I in 1972, and was incorporated into the OED Second Edition in 1989.

During the German occupation of the Netherlands, the German-Jewish writer Curt Bloch produced a series of handmade miniature magazines while hiding from the Nazis near Enschede. Between August 1943 and April 1945, he created 95 issues and one special edition of Het Onderwater-Cabaret (“The Underwater Cabaret”), containing nearly 500 poems in German and Dutch, accompanied by collaged covers made from newspapers and other printed material. The satirical poems criticized Nazi leaders, propaganda and Dutch collaborators, while also describing life in hiding. Individual copies circulated among other people in hiding and members of the local resistance network.

In fanzines, fans wrote not only about science fiction, but about fandom itself. Science fiction fanzines vary in content, including short stories, convention reports, and fanfiction. These were the earliest incarnations of the zine and influenced subsequent publications. "Zinesters" like Lisa Ben and Jim Kepner honed their talents in the science fiction fandom before tackling gay rights, creating zines such as Vice Versa and ONE that drew networking and distribution ideas from their science fiction roots. A number of leading science fiction and fantasy authors rose through the ranks of fandom, creating "pro-zines" such as Frederik Pohl and Isaac Asimov. The first version of Superman (a bald-headed villain) appeared in the third issue of Jerry Siegel and Joe Shuster's 1933 fanzine Science Fiction.

==== Star Trek ====
The first media fanzine was a Star Trek fan publication called Spockanalia, published in September 1967 by members of the Lunarians. Some of the earliest examples of academic fandom were written on Star Trek zines, specifically K/S (Kirk/Spock) slash zines, which featured a gay relationship between the two. Author Joanna Russ wrote in her 1985 analysis of K/S zines that slash fandom at the time consisted of around 500 core fans and was 100% female.

"K/S not only speaks to my condition. It is written in Female. I don't mean that literally, of course. What I mean is that I can read it without translating it from the consensual, public world, which is sexist, and unconcerned with women per se, and managing to make it make sense to me and my condition."

Russ observed that while science fiction fans looked down on Star Trek fans, Star Trek fans looked down on K/S writers. Kirk/Spock zines contained fanfiction, artwork, and poetry created by fans. Zines were then sent to fans on a mailing list or sold at conventions. Many had high production values and some were sold at convention auctions for hundreds of dollars.

==== Janus and Aurora ====
Janus, later called Aurora, was a science fiction feminist zine created by Janice Bogstad and Jeanne Gomoll in 1975. It contained short stories, essays, and film reviews. Among its contributors were authors such as Octavia Butler, Joanna Russ, Samuel R. Delany, and Suzette Hayden Elgin. Janus/Aurora was nominated for the Hugo Award for "Best Fanzine" in 1978, 1979, and 1980. Janus/Aurora was the most prominent science fiction feminist zine during its run, as well as one of the only zines that dealt with such content.

==== Comics ====
Comics were mentioned and discussed as early as the late 1930s in the fanzines of science fiction fandom. They often included fan artwork based on existing characters as well as discussion of the history of comics. Through the 1960s, and 1970s, comic fanzines followed general formats, such as the industry news and information magazine (The Comic Reader was one example), interview, history and review-based fanzines, and the fanzines which basically represented independent comic book-format exercises.

In 1936, David Kyle published The Fantasy World, possibly the first comics fanzine.

Malcolm Willits and Jim Bradley started The Comic Collector's News in October 1947. In 1953, Bhob Stewart published The EC Fan Bulletin, which launched EC fandom of imitative Entertaining Comic fanzines. Among the wave of EC fanzines that followed, the best-known was Ron Parker's Hoo-Hah! In 1960, Richard and Pat Lupoff launched their science fiction and comics fanzine Xero and in 1961, Jerry Bails' Alter Ego, devoted to costumed heroes, became a focal point for superhero comics fandom.

==== Horror ====
Calvin T. Beck's Journal of Frankenstein (later Castle of Frankenstein) and Gary Svehla's Gore Creatures were the first horror fanzines created as more serious alternatives to the popular Forrest J Ackerman 1958 magazine Famous Monsters of Filmland. Garden Ghouls Gazette—a 1960s horror title under the editorship of Dave Keil, then Gary Collins—was later headed by Frederick S. Clarke and in 1967 became the respected journal Cinefantastique. It later became a prozine under journalist-screenwriter Mark A. Altman and has continued as a webzine. Richard Klemensen's Little Shoppe of Horrors, having a particular focus on "Hammer Horrors", began in 1972 and is still publishing as of 2017. The Baltimore-based Black Oracle (1969–1978) from writer-turned-John Waters repertory member George Stover was a diminutive zine that evolved into the larger-format Cinemacabre. Stover's Black Oracle partner Bill George published his own short-lived zine The Late Show (1974–1976; with co-editor Martin Falck), and later became editor of the Cinefantastique prozine spinoff Femme Fatales. In the mid-1970s, North Carolina teenager Sam Irvin published the horror/science-fiction fanzine Bizarre which included his original interviews with UK actors and filmmakers; Irvin would later become a producer-director in his own right. Japanese Fantasy Film Journal (JFFJ) (1968–1983) from Greg Shoemaker covered Toho's Godzilla and his Asian brethren. Japanese Giants (JG) appeared in 1974 and was published for 30 years. In 1993, G-FAN was published, and reached its 100th regularly published issue in Fall 2012. FXRH (Special effects by Ray Harryhausen) (1971–1976) was a specialized zine co-created by future Hollywood FX artist Ernest D. Farino.

==== Board games ====
Board game-focused zines, especially those focused on the board game Diplomacy, took off in the 1960s. These not only contained news and articles about the hobby, but also served as a common form for the organisation of play-by-mail games.

=== Rock and roll ===
Several fans active in science fiction and comics fandoms recognized a shared interest in rock music, leading to the birth of the rock fanzine. Paul Williams and Greg Shaw were two such science fiction fans turned rock zine editors. Williams' Crawdaddy! (1966) and Shaw's two California-based zines, Mojo Navigator Rock and Roll News (1966) and Who Put the Bomp (1970), are among the most popular early rock fanzines.

Crawdaddy! (1966) quickly moved from its fanzine roots to become one of the first rock music "prozines" with paid advertisers and newsstand distribution. Bomp remained a fanzine, featuring many writers who would later become prominent music journalists, including Lester Bangs, Greil Marcus, Ken Barnes, Ed Ward, Dave Marsh, Mike Saunders and R. Meltzer as well as cover art by Jay Kinney and Bill Rotsler (both veterans of science fiction and Comics fandom). Other rock fanzines of this period include denim delinquent (1971) edited by Jymn Parrett, Flash (1972) edited by Mark Shipper, Eurock Magazine (1973–1993) edited by Archie Patterson and Bam Balam written and published by Brian Hogg in East Lothian, Scotland (1974).

In the 1980s, with the rise of stadium superstars, many rock fanzines emerged. At the peak of Bruce Springsteen's megastardom following the Born in the U.S.A. album and tour in the mid-1980s, there were no less than five Springsteen fanzines circulating at the same time in the UK alone, and many others elsewhere. Gary Desmond's Candy's Room, coming from Liverpool, was the first in 1980. This was quickly followed by Dan French's Point Blank, Dave Percival's The Fever, Jeff Matthews' Rendezvous, and Paul Limbrick's Jackson Cage. In the US, Backstreets Magazine started in 1980 and continued publication for 43 years, ceasing in 2023.

In the late 1990s, a Beatles fanzine titled Fab Four Fun Fan Page by David Curtis ran for several issues. Affectionately shortened to FFFFP the 'zine captured the playful spirit of Beatles fandom with a lively blend of games and trivia. Controversy arose with the fourth and final issue, which took a surprising turn by embracing Christian themes—an editorial shift that sharply divided its readership. While some appreciated the personal and reflective direction, others felt it strayed too far from the zine’s original lighthearted focus, ultimately marking a contentious end to FFFFP’s run. Only the first three issues have survived, making the fourth a highly sought-after collectible.

Through the 1990s, Crème Brûlée documented the post-rock genre specifically, and experimental music in general.

=== 1970s and punk ===
Punk zines emerged as part of the punk subculture in the late 1970s, along with the increasing accessibility to copy machines, publishing software, and home printing technologies. Punk became a genre for the working class because of the economic necessity to use creative DIY methods, which were echoed in both zine and Punk music creation. Zines became vital to the popularization and spread of punk spreading to countries outside the UK and America, such as Ireland, Indonesia, and more by 1977. Amateur, fan-created zines played an important role in spreading information about different scenes (city or regional-based subcultures) and bands (e.g. British fanzines like Mark Perry's Sniffin Glue and Shane MacGowan's Bondage) in the pre-Internet era. They typically included reviews of shows and records, interviews with bands, letters, and ads for records and labels.

The punk subculture in the United Kingdom spearheaded a surge of interest in fanzines as a countercultural alternative to established print media. The first and still best known UK 'punk zine' was Sniffin' Glue, produced by Deptford punk fan Mark Perry which ran for 12 photocopied issues; the first issue produced by Perry immediately following (and in response to) the London debut of the Ramones on 4 July 1976. Other UK fanzines included Blam!, Bombsite, Burnt Offering, Chainsaw, New Crimes, Vague, Jamming, Artcore Fanzine, Love and Molotov Cocktails, To Hell With Poverty, New Youth, Peroxide, ENZK, Juniper beri-beri, No Cure,Communication Blur, Rox, Grim Humour, Spuno, Cool Notes and Fumes.

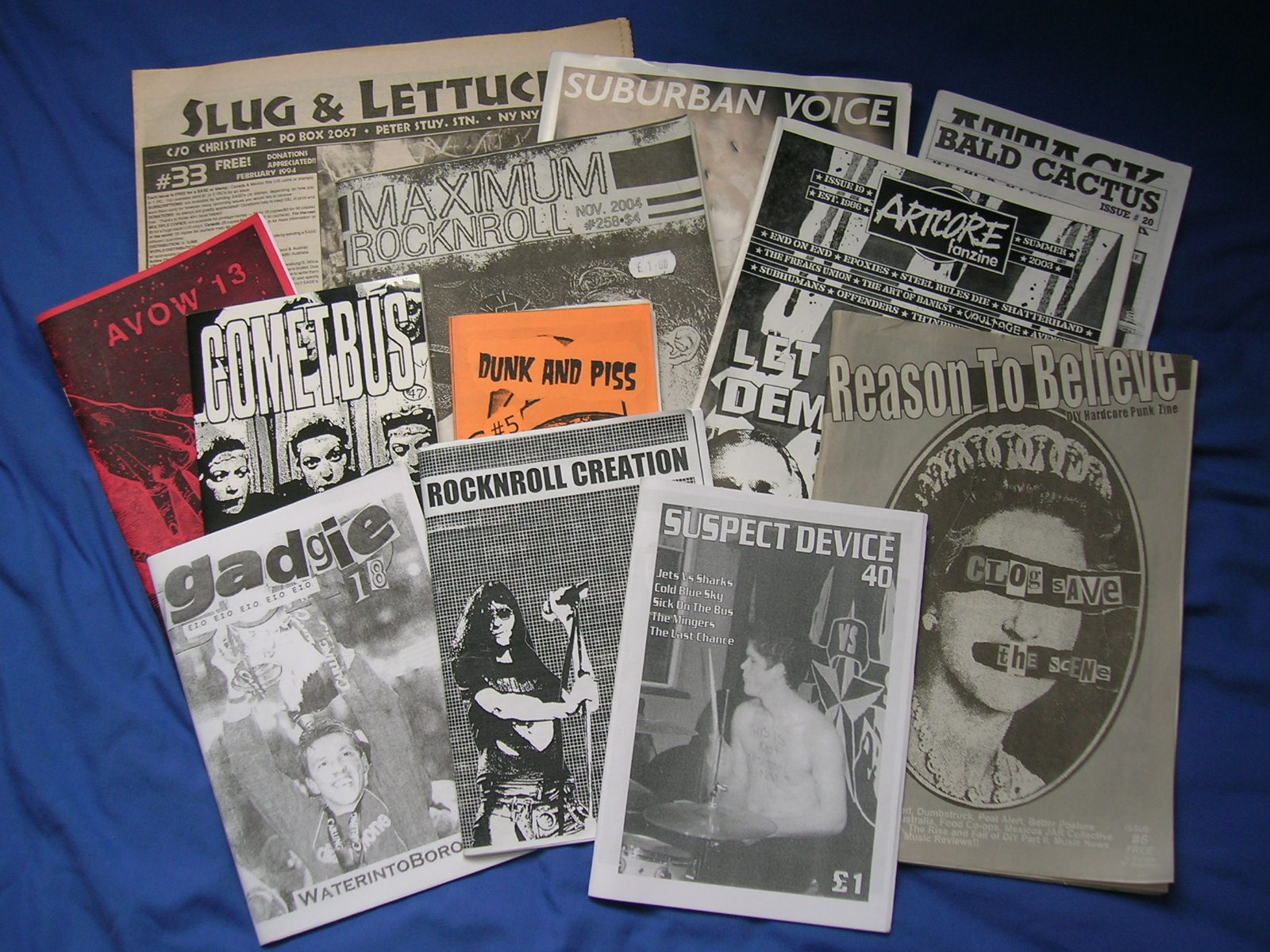
UK and US zines

By 1990, Maximum Rocknroll "had become the de facto bible of the scene, presenting a "passionate yet dogmatic view" of what hardcore was supposed to be." HeartattaCk and Profane Existence took the DIY lifestyle to a religious level for emo and post-hardcore and crust punk culture. Slug and Lettuce started at the state college of PA and became an international 10,000 copy production – all for free. In Canada, the zine Standard Issue chronicles the Ottawa hardcore scene. The Bay Area zine Cometbus was first created at Berkeley by the zinester and musician Aaron Cometbus. Gearhead Nation was a monthly punk freesheet that lasted from the early 1990s to 1997 in Dublin, Ireland. Some hardcore punk zines became available online such as the e-zine chronicling the Australian hardcore scene, RestAssured. In Italy, Mazquerade ran from 1979 to 1981 and Raw Art Fanzine ran from 1995 to 2000.

In the US, Flipside and Slash were important punk zines for the Los Angeles scene, both debuting in 1977. In 1977 in Australia, Bruce Milne and Clinton Walker fused their respective punk zines Plastered Press and Suicide Alley to launch Pulp; Milne later went on to invent the cassette zine with Fast Forward, in 1980. In the American Midwest, Touch and Go described the area's hardcore scene from 1979 to 1983. We Got Power described the LA scene from 1981 to 1984, and included show reviews and band interviews with groups including DOA, the Misfits, Black Flag, Suicidal Tendencies, and the Circle Jerks. My Rules was a photo zine that included photos of hardcore shows from across the US an in Effect, launched in 1988, described the New York City punk scene. Among later titles, Maximum RocknRoll is a major punk zine, with over 300 issues published. As a result, in part, of the popular and commercial resurgence of punk in the late 1980s, and after, with the growing popularity of such bands as Sonic Youth, Nirvana, Fugazi, Bikini Kill, Green Day and the Offspring, a number of other punk zines have appeared, such as Dagger, Profane Existence, Punk Planet, Razorcake, Slug and Lettuce, Sobriquet and Tail Spins. The early American punk zine Search and Destroy eventually became the influential fringe-cultural magazine Re/Search.

"In the post-punk era several well-written fanzines emerged that cast an almost academic look at earlier, neglected musical forms, including Mike Stax' Ugly Things, Billy Miller and Miriam Linna's Kicks, Jake Austen's Roctober, Kim Cooper's Scram, P. Edwin Letcher's Garage & Beat, and the UK's Shindig! and Italy's Misty Lane." Mark Wilkins, the promotion director for 1982 onwards US punk/thrash label Mystic Records, had over 450 US fanzines and 150 foreign fanzines he promoted to regularly. He and Mystic Records owner Doug Moody edited The Mystic News Newsletter which was published quarterly and went into every promo package to fanzines. Wilkins also published the highly successful Los Angeles punk humor zine Wild Times and when he ran out of funding for the zine syndicated some of the humorous material to over 100 US fanzines under the name of Mystic Mark.

=== Factsheet Five ===
During the 1980s and onwards, Factsheet Five (the name came from a short story by John Brunner), originally published by Mike Gunderloy but defunct, catalogued and reviewed any zine or small press creation sent to it, along with their mailing addresses. In doing so, it formed a networking point for zine creators and readers (often the same people). The concept of zine as an art form distinct from fanzine, and of the "zinesters" as member of their own subculture, had emerged. Zines of this era ranged from perzines of all varieties to those that covered an assortment of different and obscure topics. Genres reviewed by Factsheet Five included quirky, medley, fringe, music, punk, grrrlz, personal, science fiction, food, humour, spirituality, politics, queer, arts & letters, comix.

=== 1990s, riot grrrl, and queer zines ===
The riot grrrl movement emerged from the DIY Punk subculture in tandem with the American era of third-wave feminism, and used the consciousness-raising method of organizing and communication. As feminist documents, zines related to this follow a longer legacy of feminist and women's self-publication that includes scrapbooking, periodicals and health publications, allowing women to circulate ideas that would not otherwise be published. The American publication Bikini Kill (1990) introduced the Riot Grrrl Manifesto in their second issue as a way of establishing space. Zinesters Erika Reinstein and May Summer founded the Riot Grrrl Press to serve as a zine distribution network that would allow riot grrrls to "express themselves and reach large audiences without having to rely on the mainstream press".

"BECAUSE we girls want to create mediums that speak to US. We are tired of boy band after boy band, boy zine after boy zine, boy punk after boy punk after boy . . . BECAUSE in every form of media I see us/myself slapped, decapitated, laughed at, trivialized, pushed, ignored, stereotyped, kicked, scorned, molested, silenced, invalidated, knifed, shot, choked, and killed ... BECAUSE every time we pick up a pen, or an instrument, or get anything done, we are creating the revolution. We ARE the revolution."

— Erika Reinstein, Fantastic Fanzine No. 2

Women used this grassroots medium to discuss their personal lived experiences, and themes including body image, sexuality, gender norms, and violence to express anger, and reclaim/refigure femininity. Scholar and zinester Mimi Thi Nguyen notes that these norms unequally burdened riot grrrls of color with allowing white riot grrrls access to their personal experiences, an act which in itself was supposed to address systemic racism.

BUST - "The voice of the new world order" was created by Debbie Stoller, Laurie Hanzel and Marcelle Karp in 1993 to propose an alternate to the popular mainstream magazines Cosmopolitan and Glamour. Additional zines following this path are Shocking Pink (1981–82, 1987–92), Jigsaw (1988– ), Not Your Bitch 1989–1992 (Gypsy X, ed.) Bikini Kill (1990), Girl Germs (1990), Bamboo Girl (1995– ), BITCH Magazine (1996– ), Hip Mama (1997– ), Kitten Scratches (1999) and ROCKRGRL (1995–2005).

In the mid-1990s, zines were also published on the Internet as e-zines. Websites such as Gurl.com and ChickClick were created out of dissatisfaction of media available to women and parodied content found in mainstream teen and women's magazines. Both Gurl.com and ChickClick had a message board and free web hosting services, where users could also create and contribute their own content, which in turn created a reciprocal relationship where women could also be seen as creators rather than consumers.

Queer communities were heavily involved in zine culture in the 1990s. Zines such as Fuzz Box and Gender Trash from Hell shared art and writing by queer authors, provided resources for gender expression, and promoted underground events and AIDS activism. Some of these zines been archived by projects such as the Queer Zine Archive Project and the Digital Transgender Archive.

=== The early 2000s and the effect of the Internet ===
With the rise of the Internet in the mid-1990s, zines initially faded from public awareness; this is possibly due to the ability of private web-pages to fulfill much the same role of personal expression. Indeed, many zines were transformed into Webzines, such as Boing Boing or monochrom. E-zine creators were originally referred to as "adopters" because of their use of pre-made type and layouts, making the process less ambiguous. Since, social media, blogging and vlogging have adopted a similar do-it-yourself publication model.

In the UK Fracture and Reason To Believe were significant fanzines in the early 2000s, both ending in late 2003. Rancid News filled the gap left by these two zines for a short while. On its tenth issue Rancid News changed its name to Last Hours with 7 issues published under this title before going on hiatus. Last Hours still operates as a webzine though with more focus on the anti-authoritarian movement than its original title. Artcore Fanzine (established in 1986) continues to this day, recently publishing a number of 30-year anniversary issues.

In the early 2000s, zines with comics in them had a "thriving" fandom.

=== The 2010s and modern zine activism ===
Mira Bellwether's zine Fucking Trans Women, published in 2010 online and 2013 in print, proved influential in the field of transgender sexuality, receiving both scholarly and popular-culture attention. It was described in Sexuality & Culture as "a comprehensive guide to trans women's sexuality" and The Mary Sue as "the gold standard in transfeminine sex and masturbation".

Gender and sexuality continue to be a part of zine culture to this day. Due to increased online political participation as a result of the Covid-19 pandemic zine-making experienced a resurgence in the modern feminist movement. Zine-culture was shaped into a "digitally-networked feminist practice" where activism was collaboratively and freely shared across physical and online mediums.

== Zines in United States political discourse ==
In various urban regions of the United States, zines have played a variety of roles relating to social conditions and political issues, often linked to major popular movements and trends such as the civil rights movement and the antiwar movement. During the 1960s, the rise of the counterculture contributed greatly to the popularity of zines. In many cities, zines continued onward during the 1980s and 1990s, but around the 2000s, many zines moved on to the Web instead of remaining in print form.

During the 1960s, one result of the counterculture was the sudden appearance of an underground hippie press in several U.S. cities. Among the first of these was the Los Angeles Free Press, which began in May 1964 as a broadside entitled The Faire Free Press. This was soon followed by the Berkeley Barb in August 1965, the East Village Other of New York, in October 1965, The Fifth Estate, in Detroit in November 1965, and East Lansing's The Paper in December 1965. By 1966 the Underground Press Syndicate had been organized; 80 presses of U.S. and Canada came to a conference sponsored by Middle Earth in Iowa City. Liberation News Service — located in Washington, D.C., then New York, then split between New York and a commune in rural Massachusetts – served up alternative stories to the underground press world.

== Distribution and circulation ==
Zines are sold, traded or given as gifts at symposiums, publishing fairs, record and book stores and concerts, via independent media outlets, zine 'distros', mail order or through direct correspondence with the author. They are also sold online on distro websites, Etsy shops, blogs, or social networking profiles and are available for download. While zines are generally self-published, there are a few independent publishers who specialize in art zines such as Nieves Books in Zurich, founded by Benjamin Sommerhalder, and Café Royal Books founded by Craig Atkinson in 2005. In recent years a number of photocopied zines have risen to prominence or professional status and have found wide bookstore and online distribution. Notable among these are Giant Robot, Dazed & Confused, Bust, Bitch, Cometbus, Doris, Brainscan, The Miscreant, and Maximum RocknRoll.

There are many catalogued and online based mail-order distros for zines. The longest running distribution operation is Microcosm Publishing in Portland, Oregon. Some other longstanding operations include Great Worm Express Distribution in Toronto, CornDog Publishing (Ipswich) and Café Royal Books (Southport) in the United Kingdom, AK Press in Oakland, California, Missing Link Records in Melbourne and Wasted Ink Zine Distro in Phoenix, Arizona.

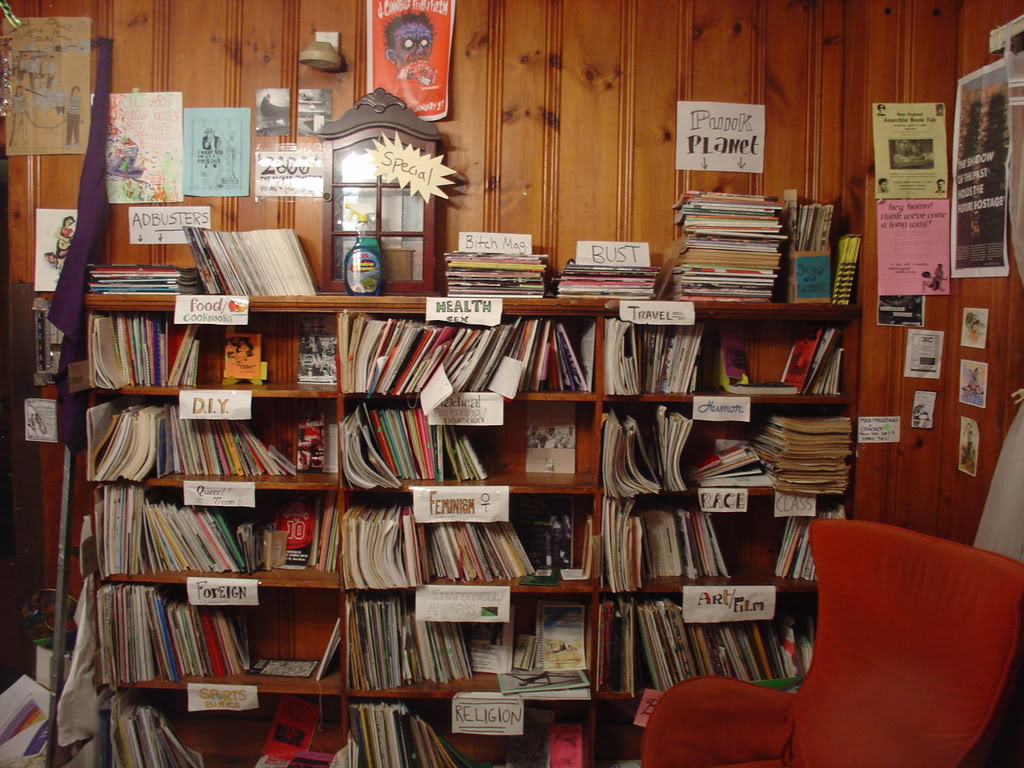
The Papercut Zine Library in Cambridge, Massachusetts

=== Libraries and archives ===
A number of major public and academic libraries as well as museums carry zines and other small press publications, often with a specific focus (e.g. women's studies) or those that are relevant to a local region.

Libraries and institutions with notable zine collections include:

- Barnard College Library
- The University of Iowa Special Collections
- The Sallie Bingham Center for Women's History and Culture at Duke University
- The Tate Museum
- The British Library
- Harvard University's Schlesinger Library
- Los Angeles Public Library
- San Francisco Public Library
- Jacksonville Public Library
- Interference Archive
- Anchor Archive Zine Library
- Toronto Zine Library
- Denver Zine Library
- Glasgow Zine Library
- Artexte Information Centre

The Indie Photobook Library, an independent archive in the Washington, D.C., area, is a large collection of photo books and photo zines dating from 2008 to 2016 which the Beinecke Rare Book & Manuscript Library at Yale University acquired in 2016. In California, the Long Beach Public Library was the first public library in the state to start circulating zines for three weeks at a time in 2015. In 2017, the Los Angeles Public Library started to circulate zines publicly to its patrons as well. Both projects have been credited to librarian Ziba Zehdar, who has been an advocate in promoting public circulation of zines at libraries in California.

It has been suggested that the adoption of zine culture by powerful and prestigious institutions contradicts the function of zines as declarations of agency by marginalized groups.

xZINECOREx is a metadata standard developed for cataloging zines. It is based on Dublin Core and the X's in its name are a reference to the straight edge music scene.

=== Zine fests, fairs, workshops, and clubs ===
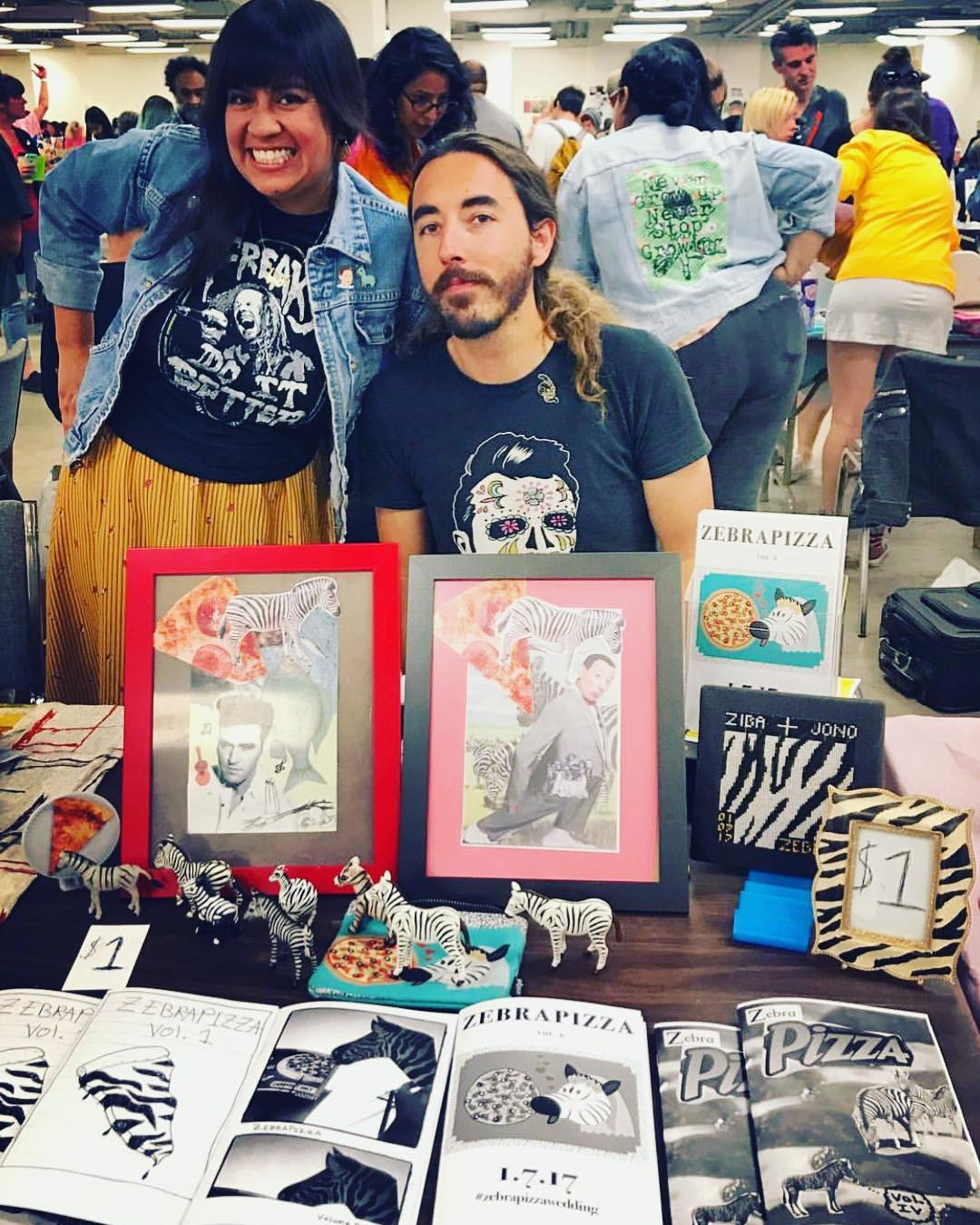
Zebrapizza tabling at the Los Angeles Zinefest in 2017

There has been a resurgence in the alternative publication culture beginning in the 2010s, in tandem with the influx of zine libraries and as a result of the digital age, which has sparked zine festivals across the globe. The San Francisco Zine Fest started in 2001 and features up to 200+ exhibitors, while the Los Angeles Zine Fest started in 2012 with only a handful of exhibitors, later hosting over 200 exhibitors. These are considered to be some of the biggest zine fests in the United States.

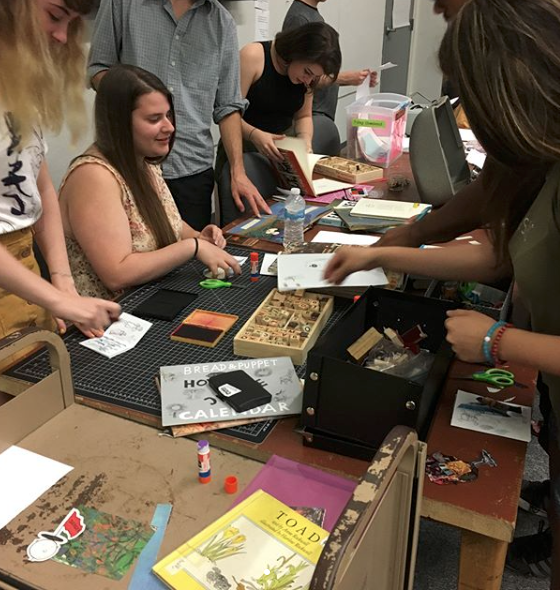
Zine workshop with SUNY New Paltz Zine Community and Design Society, 2017

Other zine fests across the globe include, San Francisco Zine Fest, Brooklyn Zine Fest, Chicago Zine Fest, Feminist Zine Fest, Amsterdam Zine Jam, Black Zine Fair and Sticky Zine Fair. At zine fests, zinesters can act as their own independent distributor and publisher through booths used to sell or barter their work, commonly customizing these booths through posters, stickers, buttons, patches, and other various additions. These events are commonly held in libraries, schools, community centers, and other places around the world.

Zine Map

The zine map is a global online platform founded in July 2025 by an Australian zine maker known as CJ. The map is used to show libraries and stores that stock zines, zine events and zinesters all around the world.

== Comparable phenomena ==
=== Samizdat ===
Samizdat (from Russian: самиздат, lit. 'self-publishing') was a form of self-publishing in the Eastern Bloc that emerged in response to censorship during the USSR and the Eastern Bloc. It existed as a way for individuals to reproduce and distribute manuscripts and documents that were banned from official publication and media. In doing so, samizdat allowed individuals to challenge dominant ideologies and powers, serving as a form of political resistance.

=== Samvydav ===
Samizdat, in a form, known in Ukrainian as Samvydav (самвидав) is still prevalent in modern day Ukraine, with its most common forms being zines and Artbooks. Samvydav, like most other formats of zine and self-publishing, gives low-budget and/or less professional artists the ability to express themselves and their ideas to the public. Modern samvydav is most commonly created and distributed digitally, however more traditional, analog methods are still present.

== In popular culture ==
Moxie (2021), a movie based on the novel of the same name, is about a 16-year old who starts a feminist zine to empower the young women at her high school. Our Hero (2000–02) and Rocket Power (1999–2004) were children's shows that featured zine-making.

== See also ==
- Artist's book
- Chapbook
- Doujinshi
- Ezine
- Fanzine
- Infoshop
- Minicomic
- Pamphlet
- Perzine
- Samizdat
- Underground comix
