= Sexuality & Culture =

- Discipline: Sexology
- Language: English
- Edited by: Roberto Refinetti

Publication details
- History: 1997–present
- Publisher: Springer
- Frequency: Quarterly
- Open access: Hybrid

Standard abbreviations
- ISO 4: Sex. Cult.

Indexing
- ISSN: 1095-5143 (print); 1936-4822 (web)
- LCCN: sn97000901
- OCLC no.: 901021824

Links
- Journal homepage; Online archive

Sexuality & Culture is a quarterly peer-reviewed academic journal covering ethical, cultural, psychological, social, and political issues related to sexual relationships and sexual behavior. The journal was established in 1997 by Barry Dank and Roberto Refinetti and published by Transaction Publishers. It is currently published by Springer Science+Business Media. The editor-in-chief is Roberto Refinetti (Boise State University).

== Abstracting and indexing ==
The journal is abstracted and indexed in:

- EBSCO databases
- Emerging Sources Citation Index
- International Bibliography of Periodical Literature
- ProQuest databases
- PsycINFO
- Scopus
