= List of magazines by circulation =

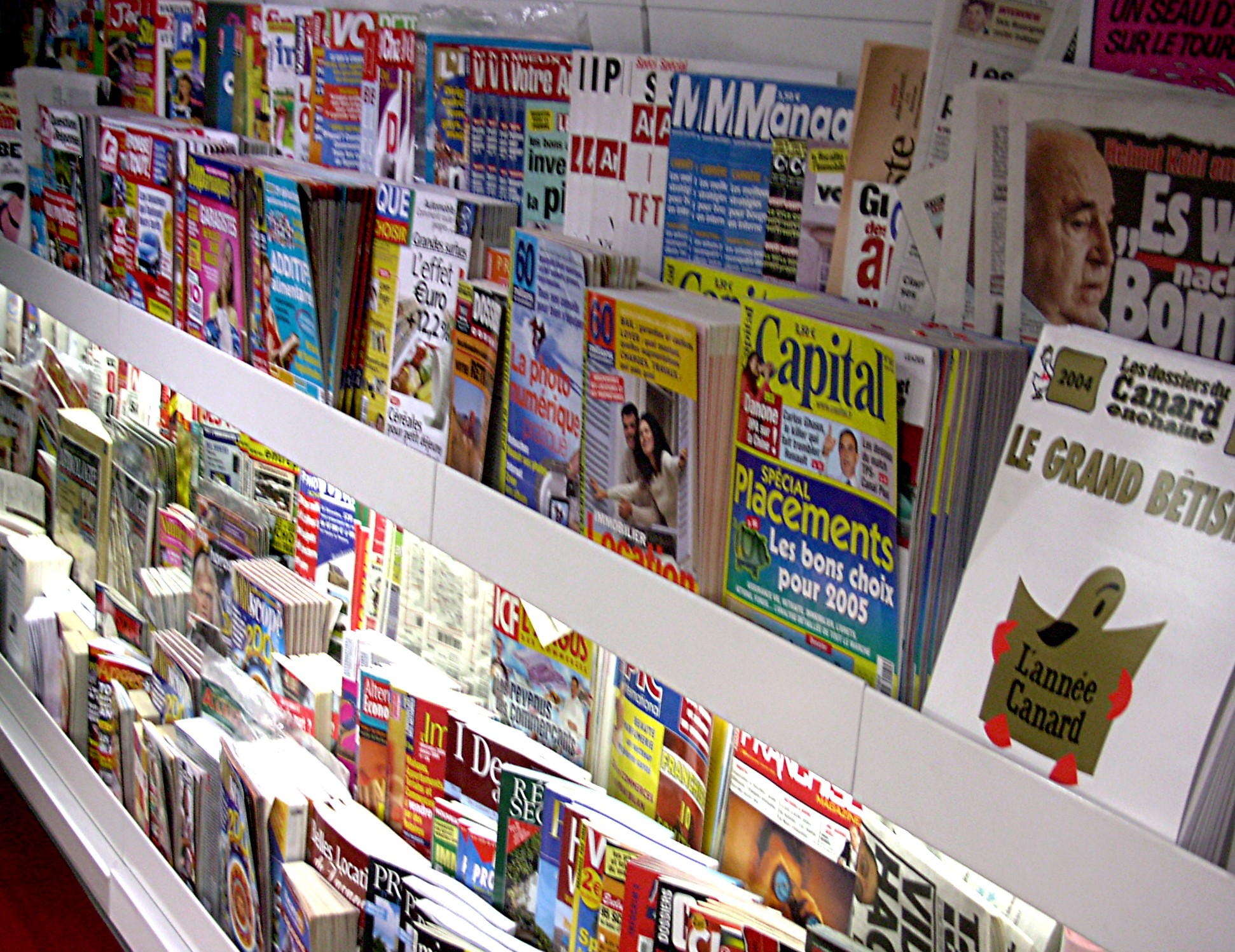
A magazine display in a shop in France in 2004

The following list of the magazines in the world by circulation is based upon the number of copies sold, on average, for each issue.

== Lists by continent and country ==
The following are lists of magazines from selected countries/regions, sorted by overall circulation:

=== Asia ===
==== India ====
Circulation according to Indian Readership Survey 2014
Magazine	2014	2013
Vanitha (Malayalam)	2,829,000	2,762,000
Pratiyogita Darpan	1,687,000	
India Today (English)	1,634,000	1,532,000
Akhand Jyoti	1,455,500	1,424,600
India Today (Hindi)	1,364,000	1,151,000
Mathrubhumi Arogya Masika (Malayalam)	1,327,000	1,129,000
Saras Salil	1,354,000	1,174,000
Samanya Gyan Darpan	1,309,000	1,094,000
Grih Shobha	1,057,000	979,000
Mathrubhumi Thozhil Vartha	974,000	928,000
Grihalakshmi (magazine)	873,000	1,012,000
Jagran Josh Plus	821,000	783,000

==== Japan ====
The following list presents the best-selling ten magazines in Japan from October 2014 to September 2015.

Rank	Name	Circulation	Founded	Publisher
1	Weekly Shōnen Jump	2,449,792	1968	Shueisha
2	Weekly Shōnen Magazine	1,145,027	1959	Kodansha
3	CoroCoro Comic	1,014,167	1977	Shogakukan
4	Shūkan Bunshun	680,296	1959	Bungeishunju
5	Weekly Young Jump	576,250	1979	Shueisha
6	Ie no Hikari	569,359	1925	Ie no Hikari Association
7	Monthly Shonen Magazine	564,617	1964	Kodansha
8	Big Comic Original	547,167	1972	Shogakukan
9	Shukan Shincho	537,596	1956	Shinchosha
10	Ciao	526,667	1977	Shogakukan

=== Europe ===
==== France ====
The following list of French magazines is ranked according to their paid circulation (per issue) in 2025:

Rank	Name	Circulation	Founded	Publisher
1	Diverto	2,931,221	2023	GIE Diverto
2	Merci pour l'Info	2,011,378	1973	Uni-Médias
3	Version Femina	1,852,788	2002	Czech Media Invest France
4	Famille et Education - Magazine de l'APEL	969,430		Association de Parents d’élèves de l’Enseignement Libre
5	Télé 7 Jours	630,903	1944	Czech Media Invest France
6	M Le Magazine du Monde	565,225	2000	Groupe Le Monde
7	Télé Z	531,021	1982	Prisma Media
8	TV Magazine	528,134	1987	Groupe Figaro
9	Télé Star	455,006	1976	Reworld Media
10	TV Grandes Chaînes	440,487	2004	Prisma Media
11	Télé 2 Semaines	419,418	2004	Prisma Media
12	Télérama	415,163	1947	Groupe Le Monde
13	Notre Temps	407,081	1968	Bayard Presse
14	Télé Loisirs	400,386	1986	Prisma Media
15	Paris Match	396,667	1949	LVMH
16	Madame Figaro	395,164	1980	Groupe Figaro
17	Le Figaro Magazine	385,941	1978	Groupe Figaro
18	Télécabo Sat Hebdo	383,578	1990	Bauer Media Group
19	Pleine Vie	288,703	1981	Reworld Media
20	Femme Actuelle	284,633	1984	Prisma Media
21	Le Point	268,788	1972	Groupe Artémis
22	L'Equipe Le Magazine	248,054	1980	Éditions Philippe Amaury
23	Marie Claire	246,306	1937	Groupe Marie Claire
24	Maxi	235,024	1986	Bauer Media Group
25	Le Particulier	229,955	1949	Groupe Figaro
26	Santé Magazine	225,114	1976	Uni-Médias
27	Avantages	224,511	1988	Groupe Marie Claire
28	Télé Poche	224,086	1966	Reworld Media
29	Elle	217,978	1945	Czech Media Invest France
30	Le Parisien Week-end / Aujourd'hui en France Week-End	214,135	2012	LVMH
31	Télé 15 jours	208,401	2019	RL Mags
32	Prima	202,812	1982	Prisma Media
33	L'Ancien d'Algérie	194,991	1958	Fédération nationale des anciens combattants en Algérie, Maroc et Tunisie
34	Maison Créative	194,710	185,421	Uni-Médias
35	Auto Plus	171,004	1988	Reworld Media / Axel Springer
36	Télé Programmes	170,991	2020	RL Mags
37	Challenges	170,878	1982	LVMH
38	Sciences et Avenir	168,610	1947	LVMH
39	Le Nouvel Obs	166,054	1950	Groupe Nouvel Observateur
40	Régal	166,016		Uni-Médias
41	Détente Jardin	165,091		Uni-Médias
42	Top Santé	163,262	1984	Reworld Media
43	Le Chasseur Français	162,034	1885	Reworld Media
44	Courrier International	161,466	1990	Groupe Le Monde
45	JDNews	148,076	2024	Lagardère Group
46	Plus de Pep's	147,337	2014	Uni-Médias
47	Modes & Travaux	142,709	1919	Reworld Media
48	Ça m'intéresse	141,012	1981	Prisma Media
49	Le Monde Diplomatique	138,241	1954	Groupe Le Monde
50	Cosmopolitan France	136,468	1973	Groupe Marie Claire

==== Germany ====
The following list of German magazines is sorted by their circulation as of the third quarter (Q3) of 2012:

Rank	Name	Circulation	Publisher
1	ADAC Motorwelt	13,643,161	ADAC
2	tv14	2,426,694	Bauer
3	Metallzeitung	2,208,709	IG Metall
4	ver.di Publik	1,912,104	ver.di
5	TV Digital	1,775,422	Axel Springer
6	House and More (Bausparkasse Schwäbisch Hall)	1,625,110	Verlagsgruppe Handelsblatt
7	VdK-Zeitung	1,395,948	Sozialverband VdK Deutschland
8	TV-Movie	1,367,567	Bauer
9	Hörzu	1,336,713	Axel Springer
10	TV Direkt	1,178,964	Gong Verlag
11	TV Spielfilm	1,165,985	Hubert Burda Media
12	auf einen Blick	1,139,022	Bauer
13	ASB Magazin	988,060	Arbeiter-Samariter-Bund Deutschland
14	Bild der Frau	956,178	Axel Springer
15	Der Spiegel	951,656	SPIEGEL-Verlag
16	Freizeit Revue	907,371	Hubert Burda Media
17	Stern	851,745	Gruner + Jahr
18	Landlust	828,652	Landwirtschaftsverlag Munster
19	TV-Hören und Sehen	791,235	Bauer
20	Der Vermögensberater	740,106	Deutsche Vermögensberatung
21	Neue Post	701,884	Bauer
22	Reader's Digest	700,649	Reader's Digest Association
23	extratour	676,699	Deutsches Jugendherbergswerk
24	Kompakt	659,460	IG Bergbau, Chemie, Energie
25	Brigitte	655,372	Gruner + Jahr
26	Bunte	634,780	Hubert Burda Media
27	TV pur	618,293	Bauer
28	nurTV	613,622	Gong Verlag
29	Focus	578,502	Hubert Burda Media
30	Funk Uhr	552,874	Axel Springer
31	DAV Panorama	542,477	German Alpine Club
32	ACE-Lenkrad	538,339	Auto Club Europa
33	Auto Bild	538,260	Axel Springer
34	Computer Bild	533,636	Axel Springer
35	Frau + Mutter	529,723	Katholische Frauengemeinschaft Deutschlands
36	Freundin	510,834	Hubert Burda Media
37	Freizeitwoche	502,992	Bauer
38	Glamour	487,488	Condé Nast
39	Fernsehwoche	484,294	Bauer
40	Tina	460,346	Bauer
41	InStyle	449,072	Hubert Burda Media
42	Sport Bild	443,592	Axel Springer
43	Freizeit Spass	422,836	Hubert Burda Media
44	Vorwärts	420,638	Social Democratic Party of Germany
45	Bravo	419,763	Bauer
46	Für Sie	426,248	Jahreszeiten Verlag
47	Joy	416,409	Marquard Media
48	TV Today	404,858	Hubert Burda Media
49	Mein schöner Garten	400,849	Hubert Burda Media
50	Auto, Motor und Sport	397,776	Motor Presse Stuttgart

==== Netherlands ====
The following list of Dutch magazines is ranked according to circulation figures:

Rank	Name	Circulation	Publisher
1	AutoPrimeurs	6,010,904	Topline Publishing
2	Kampioen	3,440,298	Royal Dutch Touring Club
3	Allerhande (Albert Heijn)	1,999,999	MediaPartners Group
4	Boodschappen	1,981,283	Superunie
5	SPOOR	1,276,782	Nederlandse Spoorwegen
6	Wathandig (Albert Heijn)	991,890	MediaPartners Group
7	Veronica	827,537	ProSiebenSat.1 Media
8	Vrouw	704,814	Mediahuis
9	Eigen Huis magazine	698,771	Eigen Huis
10	Film1 Sport1 Gids	572,620	Chello Benelux
11	Zorgbelang	512,876	Zorgbelang
12	Mooi	495,765	Etos
13	Villa d'Arte	467,854	Argo Media Groep
14	Libelle	433,293	Sanoma
15	Mikro Gids	378,448	Bindinc.
16	Het Volkskrant Magazine	351,562	DPG Media
17	ANBO Magazine	350,432	ANBO
18	Donald Duck	306,984	Sanoma
19	VARAgids	299,993	VARA
20	Mediazine	299,000	Media Markt Saturn
21	AVRObode (AVRO)	197,600	Senior Publications Nederland
22	PLUS Magazine	182,000	Riksbyggen (Bayard & Roularta)
23	GOLFjournaal	252,712	Sanoma
24	Margriet	245,583	Sanoma
25	Wij Jonge Ouders	159,200	Wegener
26	NCRV-gids	224,809	Bindinc.
27	Tennis Magazine	224,194	Springer Media
28	VPRO Gids	215,776	VPRO
29	Happinez	204,142	Happinez
30	PrimaOuders	197,437	EDG Media
31	Nestor	190,275	Unie KBO
32	Quest	185,668	Gruner + Jahr
33	Privé	182,016	Mediahuis
34	Linda	173,551	Sanoma
35	TV Krant	170,876	Hilversumse Media Compagnie
36	Flying Dutchman (KLM)	161,538	Hemels Publishers
37	De Zaak	155,001	Swedish Association of Graduate Engineers
38	Voetbal International	151,565	WPG Uitgevers
39	Glamour	148,314	Gruner + Jahr
40	Weekend	146,615	Audax Groep
41	TeleVizier	141,482	Bindinc.
42	KRO Magazine	133,559	Bindinc.
43	Elsevier	130,932	Reed Business
44	Visie	129,112	Evangelische Omroep
45	VT Wonen	124,766	Sanoma
46	TVFilm	124,701	Bindinc.
47	Nummer 1	120,465	Nummer 1
48	NL Landelijk	117,575	AKP Media
49	National Geographic	115,642	Gruner + Jahr
50	TKMST Magazine	114,350	TKMST Media

==== Portugal ====
The following list of Portuguese newspaper, magazines and books as of 2020:

==== Russia ====
The following list of Russian magazines is ranked according to circulation figures:

Rank	Name	Circulation	Publisher
1	Cosmopolitan (folded)	980.000	Independent Media Sanoma Magazines
2	Glamour (folded)	730.000	Condé Nast Publications
3	Maxim (folded)	390.000	Hearst Shkulev Media
4	Psychologies	360.000	Hearst Shkulev Media
5	Hello!	350.000	
6	Good Housekeeping (folded)	230.000	Independent Media Sanoma Magazines
7	National Geographic (folded)	230.000	Independent Media Sanoma Magazines
8	Elle (folded)	220.000	Hearst Shkulev Media
9	Haker (print publication folded)	220.000	
10	Cosmopolitan Shopping (folded)	200.000	Independent Media Sanoma Magazines
11	Igromania (print publication folded)	180.000	Tehnomir
12	Men's Health (folded)	160.000	Independent Media Sanoma Magazines
13	Playboy (folded)	160.000	Burda
14	Vogue (folded)	150.000	Condé Nast Publications
15	L'Officiel (folded)	150.000	
16	Elle Girl (folded)	140.000	Hearst Shkulev Media
17	XXL	140.000	IDR
18	Esquire (folded)	125.000	Independent Media Sanoma Magazines
19	Marie Claire	125.000	Hearst Shkulev Media
20	Harper's Bazaar (folded)	120.000	Independent Media Sanoma Magazines
21	Tatler (folded)	120.000	Condé Nast Publications
22	Forbes	120.000	Axel Springer Russia
23	OK!	120.000	Axel Springer Russia
24	InStyle (folded)	120.000	
25	FHM (folded)	110.000	IDR
26	Rolling Stone (folded)	110.000	SPN Publishing
27	GQ (folded)	100.000	Condé Nast Publications
28	GQ Style (folded)	100.000	Condé Nast Publications
29	ComputerBild	100.000	Axel Springer Russia
30	Sportweek	100.000	Global Media Group
31	PC Igry	85.000	Gameland
32	Strana Igr	80.000	Gameland
33	Chip	70.000	Hubert Burda Media
34	Wedding	70.000	Global Media Group
35	AD / Architectural Digest (folded)	60.000	Condé Nast Publications
36	Russky Newsweek (folded)	55.000	Axel Springer Russia
37	Navigator Igrovogo Mira	52.000	Navigator Publishing
38	Collezioni	50.000	Global Media Group

==== Spain ====
The following list of Spanish magazines are ranked according to circulation figures that are relevant as of 2010:

Rank	Name	Circulation	Publisher
1	Pronto	940,042	Publicaciones Heres
2	¡Hola!	481,420	Hola
3	Diez Minutos	345,386	Hearst Magazines
4	Que Me Dices	261,877	Hearst Magazines
5	Cuore	230,923	Grupo Zeta
6	Glamour	226,040	Condé Nast
7	Lecturas	203,141	RBA Revistas
8	Saber Vivir	201,184	RBA Revistas
9	Telva	190,840	Unidad Editorial
10	Elle	184,155	Hearst Magazines
11	Semana	178,337	Semana
12	Woman	178,105	Grupo Zeta
13	National Geographic	176,905	RBA Revistas
14	Muy Interesante	175,329	G+J
15	Stylissimo	142,100	Stylissimo
16	Cosas de Casa	141,843	RBA Revistas
17	Lecturas Cocina Fácil	131,860	RBA Revistas
18	Cosmopolitan	128,313	G+J
19	Clara	127,744	RBA Revistas
20	El Mueble	127,695	RBA Revistas
21	Casa Diez	126,834	Hearst Magazines
22	Vogue	125,067	Condé Nast
23	Mía	113,726	G+J
24	AR La Revista de Ana Rosa Quintana	106,086	Hearst Magazines
25	InStyle	103,734	RBA Revistas

==== Sweden ====
The following list of Swedish magazines are ranked according to their circulation figures:

Rank	Name	Circulation	Publisher
1	Buffé	2,019,500	ICA
2	Coop Mersmak	945,000	Coop Sverige
3	IKEA Family Live	646,000	IKEA
4	Hem & Hyra	537,400	Hyresgästföreningens
5	Kommunalarbetaren	535,500	Swedish Municipal Workers' Union
6	Kollega	484,000	Unionen
7	Hemma i HSB	444,800	HSB
8	Dagens Arbete	442,600	IF Metall, GS & Pappers
9	Villaägaren	321,300	Villaägarnas Riksförbund
10	Svensk Golf	315,000	Egmont
11	PRO Pensionären	303,200	Swedish National Pensioners' Organisation
12	Stadium Magazine	287,500	Stadium
13	Lärarnas Tidning	228,700	Swedish Teachers' Union
14	Pedagogiska Magasinet	223,600	Swedish Teachers' Union
15	Röda Korsets Tidning – Henry	219,200	Swedish Red Cross
16	Studentliv	214,400	Swedish Confederation of Professional Employees
17	Allers	209,900	Aller Media
18	Veteranen	204,300	Swedish Pensioners' Association
19	Hemmets Journal	202,100	Egmont
20	Land	200,022	LRF Media (Federation of Swedish Farmers)
21	Hemmets Veckotidning	197,600	Aller Media
22	Öppet Hus	182,000	Riksbyggen
23	Live Life	169,800	Life Europe
24	Turist	160,700	Svenska Turistföreningen
25	SKTF-tidningen	159,200	Swedish Union of Local Government Officers
26	Icakuriren	158,100	Forma Magazines
27	Året Runt	155,600	Aller Media
28	Ny Teknik	155,500	Talentum
29	Svensk Damtidning	149,600	Aller Media
30	Handelsnytt	147,900	Swedish Commercial Employees' Union
31	SKPF HärΝ	149,600	Just Media
32	Båtliv	147,100	Swedish Yachting Association
33	Arbetsliv	143,900	Prevent (Swedish Enterprise, LO & PTK)
34	Svensk Jakt	141,900	Swedish Hunters Association
35	Svensk Jakt NYHETER	139,100	Swedish Hunters Association
36	Hänt Extra	129,500	Aller Media
37	Ingenjören	124,800	Swedish Association of Graduate Engineers
38	Land Lantbruk	118,700	LRF Media (Federation of Swedish Farmers)
39	Vi Bilägare	118,400	OK-förlaget
40	Allas	117,900	Aller Media
41	Motor	117,300	Motormännens Riksförbund
42	Illustrerad Vetenskap	116,000	Bonnier
43	Barn	115,700	Rädda Barnen
44	Byggnadsarbetaren	114,900	Swedish Building Workers' Union
45	Se & Hör	112,800	Aller Media
46	Vårdfokus	112,400	Swedish Association of Health Professionals
47	Maison Créative	112,000	Swedish Society for Nature Conservation
48	Chef	110,800	Chef Stockholm
49	Femina	104,100	Aller Media
50	Amelia	100,100	Bonnier

==== United Kingdom ====
The following list shows the 50 largest magazines in the United Kingdom by average per-issue circulation as of 2024:

Rank	Name	Circulation	Founded	Publisher
1	Tesco Magazine	1,500,500		Tesco
2	The Economist	1,413,031	1843	The Economist Group
3	TV Choice	894,375	1999	Bauer Media Group
4	Waitrose & Partners Food	643,704	2015	Waitrose & Partners
5	The RSPB Magazine	560,824	2022	Royal Society for the Protection of Birds
6	What's on TV	528,845	1991	Future plc
7	English Heritage Members Magazine	520,750	2013	English Heritage
8	The Garden	510,232	1866	Royal Horticultural Society
9	Good Housekeeping	370,395	1922	Hearst Communications
10	Caravan and Motorhome Club Magazine	367,726	2017	Caravan and Motorhome Club
11	Radio Times	341,242	1923	Immediate Media Company
12	Stylist	327,540	2009	DC Thomson
13	Camping and Caravanning	309,352		Camping Club of Great Britain and Ireland
14	The Red Bulletin	279,129	2005	Red Bull GmbH
15	Slimming World Magazine	269,671	1998	Slimming World
16	Ocado Life	200,746		
17	Take A Break	248,544	1990	Bauer Media Group
18	Private Eye	232,638	1961	Pressdram Ltd
19	British Vogue	180,036	1916	Condé Nast
20	Country Living	176,507	1985	Hearst Communications
21	Prima	165,128	1986	Hearst Communications
22	WI Life	170,675	2007	National Federation of Women's Institutes
23	Woman & Home	161,379	1926	Future plc
24	Wanderlust	153,504	1993	Wanderlust Travel Media
25	Woman's Weekly	144,533	1911	Future plc
26	Boundless	143,774	2021	
27	Hello!	139,785	1988	Hello, Ltd.
28	Grazia UK	137,376	2005	Bauer Media Group
29	BBC Good Food	133,900	1989	Immediate Media Company
30	The Week	122,068	1995	Future plc
31	Cosmopolitan UK	120,584	1972	Hearst Communications
32	BBC History	114,967	2000	Immediate Media Company
33	Yours	111,356	1973	Bauer Media Group
34	That's Life	106,936	1995	Future plc
35	British Horse	105,200	1992	British Horse Society
36	Red	104,825	1998	Hearst Communications
37	Chat	104,171	1985	Future plc
38	House & Garden	100,886	1947	Condé Nast
39	The Spectator	100,213	1828	
40	Bella	96,933	1987	Bauer Media Group
41	The People's Friend	95,180	1869	DC Thomson
42	Closer	93,420	2005	Bauer Media Group
43	Women's Health	91,064	1998	Hearst Communications
44	Car	90,038	1962	Bauer Media Group
45	Time EMEA (Europe, Middle East, and Asia)	85,410	1945	Time
46	New Scientist	81,479	1956	Daily Mail and General Trust
47	Elle UK	79,804	1985	Hearst Communications
48	RYA Magazine	78,831	1968	Royal Yachting Association
49	Men's Health	78,354	1995	Hearst Communications
50	House Beautiful	76,512	1989	Hearst Communications

=== North America ===
==== Canada ====
The following list of Canadian magazines is sorted by their circulation totals, as of the first half of 2012, according to data from the Alliance for Audited Media (then the Audit Bureau of Circulations):

Rank	Name	Circulation	Publisher
1	What's Cooking	1,523,454	Kraft Foods/Meredith Corporation
2	Reader's Digest	597,229	The Reader's Digest Association
3	Chatelaine	550,613	Rogers Communications
4	Canadian Living	511,817	Transcontinental
	Maclean's	321,095	Rogers Communications
6	Canadian House & Home	248,158	House & Home Media
7	Style at Home	230,041	Transcontinental
8	Clean Eating	225,457	Robert Kennedy Publishing
9	Coup de Pouce	206,721	Transcontinental
10	Oxygen Women's Fitness	200,090	Robert Kennedy Publishing
11	Châtelaine	176,870	Rogers Communications
12	Canadian Geographic	168,046	Royal Canadian Geographical Society
13	Our Canada	164,656	The Reader's Digest Association
14	Financial Post Magazine	164,047	Postmedia Network
15	L'actualité	160,054	Rogers Communications
16	Today's Parent	160,035	Rogers Communications
17	Sélection du Reader's Digest	158,531	The Reader's Digest Association
18	Vervegirl	148,163	Youth Culture
19	LOU LOU	145,896	Rogers Communications
20	Fashion	141,760	St. Joseph Communications
21	Good Times	133,211	Transcontinental
22	Elle Canada	131,365	Transcontinental
23	Hello!	131,129	Rogers Communications
24	Today's Parent Baby & Toddler	131,000	Rogers Communications
25	MoneySense	130,106	Rogers Communications
26	Le Bel Age	129,719	Transcontinental
27	Flare	127,341	Rogers Communications
28	More	120,121	Transcontinental
29	Today's Parent Newborn	112,500	Rogers Communications
30	The Hockey News	104,519	Transcontinental

==== United States ====
The following list shows the 50 largest magazines in the United States by paid circulation as of 1 September 2025 based on data from the Alliance for Audited Media:

Rank	Name	Circulation	Publisher
1	AARP: The Magazine	21,850,867	AARP
2	AARP Bulletin	21,824,419	AARP
3	Costco Connection	14,788,851	Costco Wholesale
4	American Mainstreet	10,221,411	American MainStreet Publications
5	Southern Living	2,820,687	People Inc.
6	Better Homes and Gardens	2,528,309	People Inc.
7	People	2,239,525	People Inc.
8	NEA Today	2,226,409	National Education Association
9	Texas Co-op Power	1,999,711	Texas Electric Cooperatives
10	Us Weekly	1,813,091	A360media
11	Reader's Digest	1,723,492	Trusted Media Brands
12	Real Simple	1,683,025	People Inc.
13	Golf Digest	1,653,022	Condé Nast
14	American Legion Magazine	1,460,068	American Legion
15	The New Yorker	1,323,028	Condé Nast
16	The Atlantic	1,318,140	Emerson Collective
17	National Geographic	1,307,007	National Geographic Partners
18	American Rifleman	1,301,491	National Rifle Association of America
19	Vanity Fair	1,245,761	Condé Nast
20	Golf Magazine	1,220,066	People Inc.
21	Vogue	1,217,138	Condé Nast
22	Allrecipes	1,112,003	People Inc.
23	Taste of Home	1,104,796	Trusted Media Brands
24	Elle USA	1,029,587	Hearst
25	Magnolia Journal	1,011,402	Magnolia Network
26	TV Guide	973,719	NTVB Media
27	Travel + Leisure	954,318	People Inc.
28	GQ	940,065	Condé Nast
29	Food & Wine	929,543	People Inc.
30	Smithsonian	857,488	Smithsonian Institution
31	Good Housekeeping	843,945	Hearst
32	Midwest Living	812,666	People Inc.
33	Architectural Digest	812,663	Condé Nast
34	Bon Appétit	812,336	Condé Nast
35	Woman's World	801,246	Bauer Media Group
36	Carolina Country	761,282	NC Electric Cooperatives
37	Essence	760,742	Essence Communications
38	Elks Magazine	751,020	Benevolent and Protective Order of Elks
39	The Tennessee Magazine	747,750	Tennessee Electric Cooperative Association
40	Harper's Bazaar	743,701	Hearst
41	Condé Nast Traveler	730,585	Condé Nast
42	Food Network Magazine	702,443	Hearst
43	American Hunter	670,199	National Rifle Association of America
44	South Carolina Living	637,219	Electric Cooperatives of South Carolina, Inc.
45	Experience Life	625,596	Life Time, Inc.
46	Esquire	612,255	Hearst
47	Ducks Unlimited	589,356	Ducks Unlimited
48	Wired	563,179	Condé Nast
49	The Economist North America	549,884	The Economist Group
50	Forbes	535,203	Forbes

=== Oceania ===
==== Australia ====
This is a list of Australian magazines, ranked according to circulation figures as of December 2025:

Rank	Name	Circulation	Founded	Publisher
1	Coles Magazine	4,386,000		Medium Rare (News Corp Australia)
2	Fresh Ideas	4,118,000		Woolworths Media
3	Bunnings Magazine	1,735,000		Medium Rare (News Corp Australia)
4	Better Homes and Gardens Australia	1,593,000		Are Media
5	Open Road	1,205,000		NRMA
6	Australian Women's Weekly	1,172,000	1933	Are Media
7	National Geographic	1,001,000	1888	National Geographic Partners
8	Australian House & Garden	734,000		Are Media
9	Woman’s Day	606,000	1948	Are Media
10	The Australian Way	567,000		Medium Rare (News Corp Australia)
11	Australian Geographic	559,000	1986	Australian Geographic Holdings
12	Road Ahead	548,000		RACQ
13	New Idea	488,000	1902	Are Media
14	That’s Life! (Mega Monthly)	477,000		Are Media
15	Take 5 (Bumper Monthly)	468,000		Are Media
16	Gardening Australia	464,000		Nextmedia
17	Take 5 (Weekly)	437,000	1998	Are Media
18	Vogue Australia	432,000	1959	News Corp Australia
19	That’s Life!	408,000	1994	Are Media
20	Home Beautiful	400,000		Are Media
21	Street Machine	383,000	1981	Street Machine Media
22	Forbes Australia	340,000		Success Publishing
23	Australian Diabetic Living	334,000		Are Media
24	Gourmet Traveller	313,000	1966	Are Media
25	Just Cars	308,000		Just Auto Media

==== New Zealand ====
This is a list of New Zealand magazines, ranked according to circulation figures:

Rank	Name	Circulation	Founded	Publisher
1	AA Directions	367,000	1991	SCG Media / New Zealand Automobile Association
2	New Zealand Listener	224,000	1939	Are Media
3	New Zealand Woman's Day	130,000	1989	Are Media
4	Dish	125,000	2004	SCG Media
5	Kia Ora	123,000	2004	Are Media / Air New Zealand
6	Fish & Game	116,000	1993	Fish & Game New Zealand
7	The Australian Women's Weekly New Zealand	115,000	1993	Are Media
7	TV Guide	115,000	1983	Stuff
8	Cuisine	95,000	1986	Bunnings
9	NZ House & Garden	94,000	1994	Stuff
10	New Zealand Woman's Weekly	90,000	1932	Are Media
10	Habitat	90,000	2004	SCG Media / Resene
11	New Zealand Gardener	85,000	1944	Stuff
12	Mindfood	72,000	2008	McHugh Media
13	Life & Leisure	69,000	2010	Countrywide
14	Heritage New Zealand	63,000	1983	Heritage New Zealand
15	New Idea	60,000	1902	Are Media
16	Bunnings Magazine	56,000	2019	Bunnings
17	North & South	55,000	1986	School Road Publishing
18	Property Press	54,000	1978	New Zealand Media and Entertainment
19	NZ Outdoor Hunting	50,000		
20	Consumer	49,000	1959	Consumer NZ
21	Metro	48,000	1981	Metro Media Group
22	Home	45,000	1936	Nook Publishing
22	New Zealand Geographic	45,000	1989	Kowhai Media
23	Your Home & Garden	43,000	1996	Are Media
24	National Geographic	40,000	1888	National Geographic Partners
25	Kiwi Gardener	39,000	1998	Allied Media
26	That's Life!	38,000	1994	Are Media
27	Grapevine	35,000	1981	Grapevine Communications
28	New Zealand Fashion Quarterly	34,000	1980	Elcoat Media
29	Art News Aotearoa	33,000	1979	Fair Ground Art
30	Avenues	31,000	2004	Twenty Seven Publishers

== See also ==
- Alliance for Audited Media (US)
- Audit Bureau of Circulations (Hong Kong)
- Japan Audit Bureau of Circulations
- Audit Bureau of Circulations (India)
- Alliance for Audited Media, formerly known as Audit Bureau of Circulations (North America)
- Audit Bureau of Circulations (UK)
- Audit Bureau of Circulations (Norway)
- Audit Bureau of Circulations (Germany)
- International Federation of Audit Bureaux of Circulations
- List of magazines
- List of music magazines
- Newspaper circulation
- South African Audience Research Foundation
