= NGS =

NGS may stand for:

== Places ==
- NGSO (NGS orbit), non-geostationary orbit
- Nagasaki Airport (IATA airport code: NGS) in Omura, Nagasaki, Japan

== Organisations ==
- National Galleries of Scotland, representing the national art collection of Scotland
- National Garden Scheme, British organisation which promotes the opening of private gardens for charity
- National Genealogical Society, United States non-profit organization in the field of family history research
- National Geodetic Survey, United States service operating under the control of the National Oceanic and Atmospheric Administration
- National Geographic Society, United States scientific and educational institution
- National Grammar School, Lahore, Pakistan
- National Gramophonic Society, for the recording and publication of classical music
- National Grid Service, UK academic computing grid
- Newcastle Grammar School, New South Wales, Newcastle, Australia
- NGS Secure, UK-based security company
- Nortel Government Solutions, US-based IT services company
- NordicGreenSolutions, carbon emission compensation company
- NGS, Russian digital mass media outlet with headquarter in Novosibirsk

== Military ==
- Naval General Service Medal (disambiguation) (NGS medal)
  - Naval General Service Medal (1847) awarded for various naval actions during the period 1793–1840
  - Naval General Service Medal (1915) awarded for various naval actions from 1915 to 1962
- Naval Gunfire Support, the practice of firing at land based targets from offshore

== Other ==
- NASDAQ Global Select Market, see NASDAQ#Market tiers
- Neutral grain spirit, or pure grain alcohol
- Next-generation sequencing, a type of DNA sequencing
- Ninja Gaiden Sigma, a video game
- Nitrogen Generation System, found in aircraft to reduce fire risk in fuel tanks, a type of inerting system

== See also ==
- NG (disambiguation)
- NSG (disambiguation)
- SNG (disambiguation)
- SGN (disambiguation)
- GNS (disambiguation)
- GSN (disambiguation)
