= GNS =

GNS may refer to:

== Places ==
- Binaka Airport, in Gunung Sitoli, Nias Island, Indonesia
- Gainesville station (Georgia), an Amtrak station in Georgia, United States

== Companies and organizations ==
- Gesellschaft für Nuklear-Service, a German nuclear-waste services company
- Ghana Nuclear Society, nuclear energy advocacy organization
- Glenlyon Norfolk School in Victoria, British Columbia, Canada
- GNS Healthcare, an American data analytics company
- GNS Science, a New Zealand earth-science research institute
- Gordon-North Sydney Hockey Club, based in Sydney, Australia
- Government of National Salvation, in Serbia during the Second World War
- Gunns, a defunct Australian timber company
- Government of National Stability, an unrecognized provisional government of Libya

== Other uses ==
- Gelfand–Naimark–Segal construction, a theorem in functional analysis
- General News Service, a BBC-internal news-distribution service
- GEOnet Names Server, a database of place names and locations
- The Good Night Show, television programming block on Sprout
- Green nail syndrome, a nail infection
- GNS theory, in role-playing game design
- GNU Name System, a decentralized name-system
- Grain or grape neutral spirit, highly concentrated and purified ethanol
- Guinea (coin), for guineas, plural form of former British coin and currency unit
- N-acetylglucosamine-6-sulfatase, an enzyme

== See also ==
- GN (disambiguation)
- GSN (disambiguation)
- NGS (disambiguation)
- NSG (disambiguation)
- SNG (disambiguation)
- SGN (disambiguation)
