= Peter Holder =

Australian journalist and writer (born 1964)

- Born: 11 October 1964 (age 62); Sydney
- Education: Newington College
- Occupations: Magazine publisher, journalist and non-fiction writer

Peter John Holder (born 11 October 1964) is an Australian magazine publisher, journalist and non-fiction writer. In January 2013, Bauer Media Group appointed him as publisher of its joint venture titles with Hearst Magazines International. The group's magazines include Harper's Bazaar and Elle. He left Bauer Media in 2014 after 11 years employment. Holder was appointed as the acting managing director of the Daily Mail Australia in February 2015. By the May of that year he became permanent managing director of the Mail in Australia. He is an Industry Member of the Australian Press Council.

== Early life ==
Holder was born in Sydney and attended Newington College (1974–1982) commencing as a preparatory school student in Wyvern House.

== Journalism ==
Holder has been publisher of Take 5, NW, OK!, TV Week and men's magazines Empire, Rolling Stone and Men's Style Australia.

== Publications ==
- Harry M Miller: confessions of a not-so-secret agent – Harry M Miller with Peter Holder (Hachette Australia, 2009)
