= Flipsters =

Brand of folding shoes

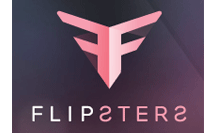

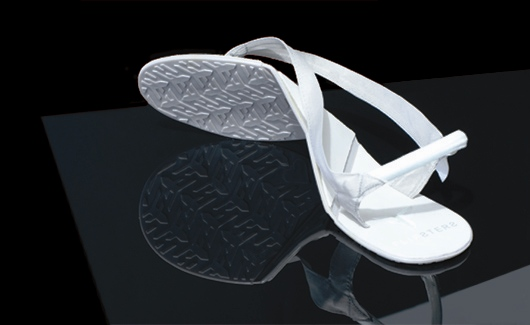
A Flipster

Flipsters (flɪp-stərs) are folding shoes, designed in Australia by L&M Designs. The footwear is produced in two styles: flip-flops and ballet flats. Flipsters footwear fold into a pouch which can be fit into a handbag and act as an alternative to standard shoes. The product is designed to "fit into a small handbag to give stiletto-shoed feet a break" The flip-flops are made with a 3-part rubber sole and fabric heel guard that allows the shoe to collapse flat, and while expanded provides support and structure similar to a standard flip flop. Flipsters come in a pouch designed to keep the product protected and clean. The product was designed with a triangle fold designed to mimic the motion of natural walking. Matt Schmidt, Editor at "My Life News", described the innovative flipflop as "stylish and comfy".

== History ==
Flipsters were created in 2009 by law student Ben Lipschitz and industrial designer Rick Munitz under the company L&M Designs. In addition to its website, Flipsters are found in retail shops across Australia, and the product is also exported to a number of other countries outside of Australia.

In May 2010 Flipsters was used to promote the Volkswagen's new product line, "The Polo". The founders of Flipsters were invited by the company to speak about design and comfort due to Volkswagen's intention to convey those message. Unfortunately it has become impossible recently, to buy these flip-flops from US retailers that used to supply them.

== In the media ==
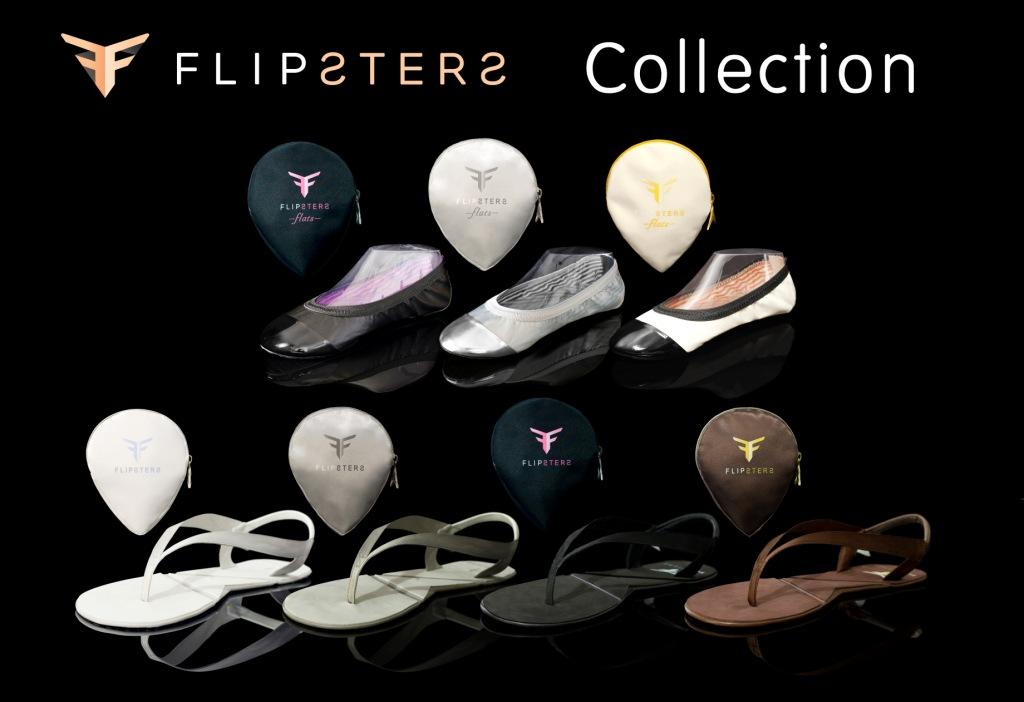
A collection of all Flipster designs

Flipsters has featured on The Morning Show and Sky Business News as well as a number of women’s and lifestyle media including NW, That’s Life, mX, The Sun Herald Sunday Life and Woman's Day online.

- Channel 7's The Morning Show featured Flipsters in December 2010, reporting the product as "[one of] the best gifts for under $30 according to Deputy Editor of Better Homes and Garden's Magazine Dora Papas."
- In December 2010 Flipsters was featured in Sydney/Melbourne/Brisbane's commuter magazine mX as a new product and supporter of the Ovarian Cancer Research Founding.
- Dynamic Export featured Flipsters in January 2010 as "revolutionists" in footwear. The article commented that Flipsters are versatile and waterproof and can be used anywhere from at the beach to travel.
- As a Melbourne Cup outfit recommendation, the Wenthworth Courier featured Flipsters in October 2010.
- NineMSN covered Flipsters in a television interview suggesting Flipsters as a comfortable resolution to uncomfortable high heels.
- The Daily Telegraph did a story on Flipsters in October 2009 marketing the product as "an origami-like thong with a rubber sole and silk straps that fits easily into a small evening bag."
