= Anthony Hayward =

British journalist and author (born 1959)

- Born: 26 October 1959 (age 67); Caversham, Berkshire, England
- Education: London College of Printing
- Occupations: Journalist, author
- Writing career
- Notable works: Which Side Are You On? Ken Loach and His Films (2004)

Anthony Hayward (born 26 October 1959) is a British journalist and author. He is a regular contributor to The Guardian and The Daily Telegraph, and has written more than 20 books about television and film. The subjects of justice and censorship have been constant themes throughout his work. "Hayward is particularly good on conflicts with authority," wrote one critic reviewing his biography Which Side Are You On? Ken Loach and His Films (Bloomsbury Publishing, 2004).

== Early life ==
Hayward was born in Caversham, Berkshire, brought up near Romsey, Hampshire, and attended Bishop Wordsworth's School, Salisbury, from 1971 to 1978. He trained as a journalist at the London College of Printing (now the London College of Communication, University of the Arts) (1978–1980) and won its 1979–1980 Journalism Prize. He gained a Higher National Diploma in Journalism and the National Council for the Training of Journalists' Pre-Entry Journalism Certificate, both with distinction.

== Career ==
Hayward was a reporter, features writer and subeditor on local newspapers and national magazines, editor of the Deben Journal, the trade magazine Radio and the consumer magazine New Video Viewer, and a subeditor on national newspapers, before joining the staff on the features desk of TV Times (1985–1989). He turned freelance in 1989 and has since written about television and film for publications in the United Kingdom, United States, Canada, Australia, New Zealand, France and South Africa.

He has contributed to The Guardian (since 2009), The Daily Telegraph (since 2018), The Times (since 2023) and The Independent (since 1993), as well as writing for the i, The Herald, Scotland, The Scotsman, Daily Mirror, Sunday Mirror, Sunday People, Daily Mail, Daily Express, Sunday Express, The Sun, Sunday magazine, Now, best, Chat, Take a Break, Saga, Yours, Private Eye, TV Times, What's on TV, TV & Satellite Week, Inside Soap, TV Week (Canada), TV Week (Australia), TV Guide (New Zealand), The Stage, Screen International, Broadcast, Sight & Sound and The Listener. He has also been a contributor to BBC Radio 4's Last Word programme since 2017 and consultant on the Channel 5 series Secrets & Scandals of... (2022).

- Portfolio of selected articles by Anthony Hayward
- Updating list of articles by Anthony Hayward

== Critical reception ==
In 2001, Hayward's book In the Name of Justice: The Television Reporting of John Pilger was published by Bloomsbury. It was described by the Far Eastern Economic Review as "an excellent introduction to abuses of power around the world" and by Julian Petley (The Independent) as "a fascinating account of the changing nature of censorship on British television". Den Shewman, of the American film trade magazine Variety, wrote: "Anthony Hayward's excellent account of Pilger's work shows how [his] sensibility [to justice and injustice] has driven Pilger to create 50 British television documentaries over the last 30 years, programs that have changed public policy and saved lives… Pilger's professional life has been dedicated to exploring tragic situations, and Hayward stares unblinkingly into these horrors". In 2013, Profiles International Media published an updated account, Breaking the Silence: The Films of John Pilger, as an e-book to tie in with Pilger's documentary film Utopia.

Which Side Are You On? Ken Loach and His Films, Hayward's 2004 book, was described by the New Statesman as "an eloquent insight into the work of Britain's finest and most courageous film director".

== Media appearances ==
As well as giving scores of radio and television interviews, Hayward has been chair or speaker at many events, including the Hay Festival of Literature and the Arts (2001, 2004, 2006), the Ways with Words Festival, Dartington (2001), the Mashamshire Arts Festival (2005), the Bradford Film Festival (2006, 2007) and the AV Festival (2008). The discussion with John Pilger that he chaired at the 2006 Hay Festival was included as a bonus feature with the DVDs Documentaries That Changed the World (2006) and Heroes – The Films of John Pilger 1970–2007 (2008).

In 2024, Hayward hosted the opening evening of the British Film Institute's month-long season Hidden Truths: John Pilger and the Power of Documentary, presenting an illustrated career overview, then chairing a panel discussion on the journalist and documentary-maker's legacy with Ken Loach, Richard Creasey, Victoria Brittain and Christopher Hird.

== Books ==
- Who’s Who on Television (Boxtree, 1990, 1994, 1996)
- Coronation Street: Celebrating 30 Years (co-author and editor, Boxtree, 1990)
- Phantom: Michael Crawford Unmasked (Weidenfeld & Nicolson, 1991)
- Life in the Street: Coronation Street Past and Present (co-author and editor, Boxtree, 1991)
- Street Cred: Spotlight on Coronation Street’s Rising Stars (Boxtree, 1991)
- The Who’s Who of Soap Operas (Guinness Publishing, 1991)
- The Boxtree A-Z of TV Stars (Boxtree, 1992)
- TV Unforgettables (with Deborah Hayward, Guinness Publishing, 1993)
- Annie’s Song: My Life & Emmerdale (with Sheila Mercier, Titan Books, 1994)
- The New and Revised Guinness Who’s Who of Soap Operas (Guinness Publishing, 1995)
- Prime Suspect (co-author and editor, Carlton Books, 1996)
- The Making of Moll Flanders (Headline, 1996)
- The Emmerdale Companion: A Celebration of Twenty-five Years (Orion Media, 1997)
- Gold: The Making of Band of Gold and the Sequel Gold (Chameleon Books/André Deutsch, 1997)
- Emmerdale: Behind the Scenes (Orion Media, 1998)
- The Peak Practice Companion (with Deborah Hayward, Orion Media,1998)
- Where the Heart Is (with Deborah Hayward, Orion Media, 1999)
- Julie Christie (Robert Hale, 2000)
- In the Name of Justice: The Television Reporting of John Pilger (Bloomsbury Publishing, 2001)
- TV ("The Good Web Guide" series, The Good Web Guide, 2001)
- Which Side Are You On? Ken Loach and His Films (Bloomsbury Publishing, 2004)
- Breaking the Silence: The Television Reporting of John Pilger (Network, 2008)
- Breaking the Silence: The Films of John Pilger (Profiles International Media, 2013)
- Contributor to the Oxford Dictionary of National Biography (Oxford University Press, 2004 and updates), Chambers Biographical Dictionary (Chambers, centenary edition, 1997), The Best of British (Best of British Publications, 1993) and Film Review annual (W H Allen, Columbus, Virgin, 1983–92)
