= Take Five (disambiguation) =

"Take Five" is a jazz standard originally recorded by the Dave Brubeck Quartet.

Take Five or Take 5 also may refer to:

== Music ==
- Take 5 (band), an American boy band (with an eponymous album)
- Take Five (revue), a 1957 American musical revue
- "Take 5", a song by Hikaru Utada from Heart Station

== Television and radio ==
- Take 5 with Zan Rowe, an Australian TV music programme hosted by Zan Rowe
- Take Five (TV series), a 1987 American sitcom
- Take Five (XM), a former XM Satellite Radio channel

== Other uses ==
- Take 5 (candy), a Hershey candy bar
- Take 5 (magazine), an Australian women's magazine
- Take Five, a music application from The Iconfactory
- Take Five Scholars, an academic program at the University of Rochester
- Take 5, a New York Lottery game
- Take Five, a novel by D. Keith Mano
- Take Five (film production company), co-producers of the 2024 film Flow

== See also ==
- Take Five Live, a 1961 album by Carmen McRae
