= TV Week =

Australian magazine

- January 2019
- Editor: Stephen Downie
- Former editors: Emma Nolan, Thomas Woodgate, Amber Giles
- Founded: 1957
- First issue: 5–11 December 1957
- Company: Are Media
- Country: Australia
- Language: English
- Website: www.nowtolove.com.au/tvweek

TV Week is a weekly Australian magazine that provides television program listings information and highlights, as well as television-related news.

Content ranges from previews for upcoming storylines of popular television programs, particularly dramas, comedies, soap operas and reality shows airing in Australia, celebrity interviews, gossip and news reports about television, movies and music. A full weekly program guide with highlights is featured, as well listings for streaming services and crossword puzzles.

It was first published as a Melbourne-only publication in December 1957 (as TV-Radio Week), bearing a strong affiliation to television station Channel Nine, GTV9. The publication is also well known for its association with the annual TV Week Logie Awards.

== History ==
=== Early days ===
The first issue of TV-Radio Week published in Melbourne covered the week 5–11 December 1957, with popular GTV9 performers Geoff Corke and Val Ruff featured on the cover. In 1958, the title was shortened to TV Week. Around 1956, radio magazine Listener In first published in 1925 adapted with the times and began covering television and added "TV" to its title. As part of the Herald and Weekly Times (HWT) group, Listener In-TV had an affinity to the company's new television station, HSV7. The magazine was renamed TV Scene in 1976.

Rival publication Television Preview, produced by the Television Owners Club of Australia, was also launched in 1957. By June 1958, the two magazines had more competition with TV News, published by the Australian Broadcasting Commission (ABC) and a fortnight later Australian Consolidated Press (ACP) launched its own guide, TV Times.

It was thought that so many television titles in the market was unsustainable, so ACP entered into a co-publishing deal with the ABC, which saw their respective magazines merged to become TV News-Times, soon simplified to TV Times. By the end of 1958, Television Preview was incorporated into TV Week, leaving two strong rival publications in the market for the next two decades.

In July 1958, TV Week added an edition in Sydney, then the only other TV market in Australia. It continued to expand publication as television launched in other capital cities and regional areas across Australia. At the close of 1958, Melbourne readers were invited to vote for their favourite TV personalities and programs, to be presented awards along with some categories judged by an industry panel. Graham Kennedy and Panda Lisner from GTV's In Melbourne Tonight were voted Melbourne's Most Popular TV personalities. Kennedy then named the awards the Logies, after the inventor of the first working television system, John Logie Baird.

TV Week introduced colour internal pages in 1962, moving to gloss colour covers and internal pages in 1967. As a final evolutionary stage, the magazine doubled size from A5 to A4 in July 1968.

=== Mergers and rivals ===
By 1971 TV Week had a national weekly circulation of 400,000. South Australia's TV Guide (formerly TV-Radio Tonight) attempted to launch a Melbourne edition in 1973 but only lasted for four months and later became known as TV-Radio Extra in its home state. TV Week and TV Times dominated the market across Australia. In 1979, Family Circle Publications introduced a local version of the American magazine TV Guide, in the compact A5 size.

In 1980, the ABC chose to end its agreement with TV Week and ACP purchased their interest. ACP then entered into a partnership with News Limited, leading to rival publication TV Times being incorporated into TV Week. Later that year, Family Circle Publications sold the national TV Guide to ACP and it was also incorporated into TV Week. Competition then came from existing women's magazines when The Australian Women's Weekly began including a free television magazine TV Weekly (later TV World) as an insert for its publication in May 1980. Family Circle followed suit in August 1980, as did Woman's Day with TV Day in November 1981. TV Week hit a peak circulation of 850,000 in the mid-1980s.

In 1984, the Federal Publishing Company's tabloid celebrity gossip magazine Star Enquirer was restyled to become TV Star but only ran until 1985. The Victorian publication TV Scene (formerly Listener In-TV) was shut down after 62 years of publication after it was handed over to Southdown Press, following the media shake-up sparked by Rupert Murdoch's takeover of the Herald and Weekly Times Group Group. TV-Radio Extra was discontinued in South Australia in 1988 when it was incorporated into the Sunday Mail's free television guide, TV Plus. With an increasing number of these types of free magazine supplements in Sunday newspapers across the country in the 1990s, TV Week began to lose significant circulation.

In 1998, in an attempt to boost its local entertainment news credentials, Who Weekly introduced a TV supplement with television news and TV listings but by 2000 this had been dropped.

=== Later years ===
TV Week was a joint venture between Kerry Packer's Australian Consolidated Press and Southdown Press (later Pacific Publications), with the latter publishing the magazine on behalf of both parties. In 2002, Packer bought TV Week out of the joint venture, with a clause in the agreement. A legal battle over the custody of the magazine's Logie Awards followed as both Australian Consolidated Press and Pacific Publications claimed ownership. Pacific wanted to use the Logies to promote their new rival TV listing What's on Weekly but Packer won the battle and the Logies remain connected to TV Week. What’s on Weekly ceased publication by the end of that year and it became the last attempt to launch a national rival to TV Week, now with a circulation of 265,000.

ACP Magazines sold TV Week and Foxtel magazine to German Bauer Media Group in 2012. In 2016, another women's magazine New Idea published by Pacific Magazines, introduced TV Extra a supplement covering television news and highlights, however it did not contain TV listings.

In recent years, online program guides have had a significant effect on TV Week's traditional market with circulation dropping below 200,000.

In 2020, Are Media acquired TV Week as part of its acquisition of Bauer Media's Australian and New Zealand assets. Are Media promoted associate editor, Stephen Downie, to editor of the publication in 2021. Outgoing editor Amber Giles was appointed to lead the entertainment group.

== Criticism ==
In 2013, TV Week received criticism from former Neighbours actress Kym Valentine for their lack of coverage of Neighbours. Valentine tweeted to TV Week, saying: "Why don't you give Neighbours as much coverage as Home and Away? The fans are asking for it? Bring back the love xx".

== TV Week Soap Extra ==
TV Week Soap Extra
- Editor: Erin McWhirter
- Founded: 2014
- First issue: 31 July 2014
- Final issue: 29 October 2015
- Company: Bauer Media Group
- Country: Australia
- Language: English

TV Week Soap Extra was an Australian fortnightly television magazine, produced as a sister magazine to TV Week.

In January 2014, Bauer Media published a one-off special of TV Week Soap Extra which featured exclusive teasers and first-look photos of upcoming storylines, reviews, and interviews with the stars from local and international soap operas screening in Australia, including Neighbours, Home and Away, The Bold and the Beautiful, The Young and the Restless and Days of Our Lives. Other soaps included in its content were Coronation Street, EastEnders, Emmerdale, Hollyoaks, and Shortland Street.

On 14 July 2014, Bauer Media confirmed that they would be launching TV Week Soap Extra as a fortnightly magazine dedicated to the storylines of Australian and overseas soaps and dramas. The decision came after Bauer Media had identified a gap in the market for a contemporary magazine that covered television soaps and dramas. TV Week deputy editor Erin McWhirter told TV Tonight, "The one-off special of TV Week Soap Extra we produced and launched in January was a huge success. Off the back of that, as well as TV Week's reputation as a known and trusted brand, it was evident there was enough room in the magazine market for TV Week Soap Extra as an ongoing offering." The 66-page magazine was edited by McWhirter, published on a Thursday and cost $4.50. The first issue was available from 31 July 2014.

The final issue of Soap Extra was released on 29 October 2015. Following its release, their coverage of soap operas moved back to TV Week. McWhirter told TV Tonight, "Whilst Soap Extra has attained a loyal following since launch, due to the relative size of the soap market the business decision has been made that the popular content from Soap Extra is better placed within TV Week.

== TV Week Close Up ==
TV Week Close Up
- Editor: Thomas Woodgate
- Founded: 2018
- First issue: 2 August 2018
- Company: Bauer Media Group
- Country: Australia
- Language: English

TV Week Close Up is an Australian monthly television magazine, produced as a sister magazine to TV Week.

On 2 August 2018, Bauer Media launched TV Week Close Up as a monthly magazine dedicated to interviews with stars and industry power brokers and behind the scenes stories about Australia's most popular TV shows. TV Week editor Thomas Woodgate told Mumbrella, "TV Week has earned the trust of our best talent over many years, and we have unrivalled access to Australian stars and shows. It's this access that we want to be able to share every month. We want to provide more of what we know readers love, which is in-depth chats, photo shoots with the stars, exclusive behind- the-scenes looks at favourite shows, and nostalgic trips down TV memory lane". The magazine was sold at a special launch price of $2.99 but normally sells for $5.99.

== See also ==
- TV Guide
