= Fontanka.ru =

Russian online newspaper

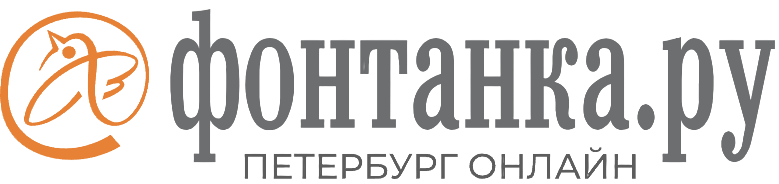
- Type: Online newspaper
- Owner: Victor Shkulev
- Founder(s): Andrey Konstantinov, Alexander Gorshkov, Andrey Potapenko, Evgeny Vyshenkov
- Publisher: Azhur Media
- Editor-in-chief: Alexander Gorshkov
- Founded: 1999
- City: Saint Petersburg
- Country: Russia
- Readership: 91,000+
- Website: www.fontanka.ru

Fontanka.ru is a Russian Saint Petersburg-based online newspaper founded in 1999 by four journalists. In 2019, controlling stake of the newspaper's publisher Azhur-Media was bought by media manager Victor Shkulev, making him the owner of Fontanka.ru. The newspaper is considered to be one of the most cited publications in Russia and largest news outlet in Saint Petersburg.

== History ==
Fontanka.ru was founded in 1999 by four journalists: Andrey Konstantinov, Alexander Gorshkov, Andrey Potapenko and Evgeny Vyshenkov. The newspaper's website was estimated to have audience of over 91,000 people aged 12 to 64 with 34,000 daily visits. In 2009, Fontanka.ru claimed that the website was visited a total of 124 million times. Vedomosti reported that Fontanka.ru is one of the most authoritative media outlets in Saint Petersburg known for its corruption investigations. RBC News reported that Fontanka.ru is one of Russia's most widely cited publications, taking 7th place. The newspaper's revenue was reported to be at over 164 million rubles (in 2017). Fontanka.ru usually reports on Saint Petersburg and northwestern regions of Russia. Its news are of a socio-political nature, reporting on issues of economics, crime, and politics.

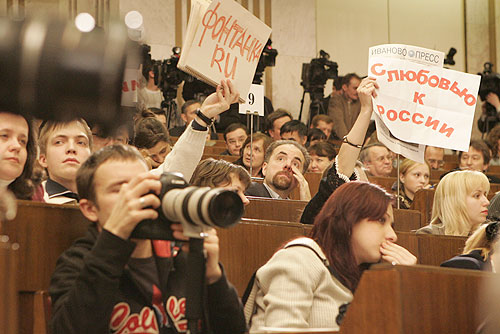
Fontanka.ru journalists at Vladimir Putin's annual press conference in 2008

In January 2013, Swedish publishing group Bonnier AB became the owner of the newspaper after purchasing 51% of the shares of the newspaper's publisher Azhur-Media for approximately $7,5 million. The group attempted to buy Fontanka.ru back in 2008 but was unsuccessful. In July 2015, the design of the Fontanka.ru's website was updated, the editorial staff said that the website became "wider, lighter, and more informative". In December 2015, due to a law prohibiting foreign companies from owning 20% of the shares, the group had to give up its controlling stake. Fontanka.ru later claimed that 51% of its shares were bought back by minority shareholders. In January 2019, media manager Victor Shkulev became the owner of Fontanka.ru after buying controlling stake of Azhur-Media for undisclosed amount.

On October 31, 2017, it was reported that oligarch Yevgeny Prigozhin was attempting to buy Fontanka.ru along with other publication based in Saint Petersburg. Prigozhin later denied the allegations, stating that he had no plans to buy the outlets. In 2018, Fontanka.ru was nominated for and won the Free Media Awards.

== Controversies ==
On August 21, 2017, journalist Denis Korotkov of Fontanka.ru published multiple articles analyzing Wagner Group's activities in Syria, naming them "The Wagner List". Afterwards, various small news websites and blogs started accusing Korotkov of being a "traitor to the Motherland" and an "agent of the Ukrainian Security Service and ISIS", the sites also shared his personal information. One month later, the sites attacked Fontanka.ru; hundreds of LiveJournal blogs accused Fontanka.ru of corruption and of having homosexual employees. Some blogs shared confidential banking information of Fontanka.ru. In October 2017, website of Fontanka.ru was hacked. Editor-in-chief Alexander Gorshkov told Vedomosti that the website's servers were hacked and clarified that it was not related with recent Bad Rabbit virus outbreak. He further told Novaya Gazeta that the events prior were connected and part of an intimidation campaign linked to the Russian government. In November 2017, multiple sources reported that employees of Fontanka.ru had received threats from internet trolls in retaliation for reporting on a "troll factory" linked to Prigozhin.

Fontanka.ru was accused of extorting businessmen. Sources alleged that Fontanka.ru asked them for large donations and if they refused, it published negative articles about them. In 2016, a website named "НЕ ПЛАТИ ФОНТАНКЕ" (Don't Pay Fontanka) was created with the purpose of sharing stories of individuals who claimed to have been victims of extortion by Fontanka.ru. In May 2018, web portal Apn.ru alleged that Fontanka.ru employees sympathized with Russian opposition leader Alexei Navalny and criticized the Russian government.

In July 2022, Prigozhin called Fontanka.ru and two other publications "traitors to their country", claiming that Fontanka.ru became a "haven for the traitor to the Motherland" and regularly published articles critical of Russian Armed Forces and Wagner Group. In August 2022, Prigozhin filed a criminal complaint against editor-in-chief of Fontanka.ru and editor Ksenia Klochkova for disseminating "false information" about Russian Armed Forces in one of the articles. On May 10, 2023, Telegram channel of Fontanka.ru was briefly hacked.
