= Rob Owen (journalist) =

American journalist and newspaper editor (born 1971)

Rob Owen (born 1971) is an American journalist and newspaper editor.

== Career ==
=== Columnist and editor ===
Owen's career includes stints as a radio and television columnist at the Albany-focused Times Union in Albany, New York. He was also a features writer at the Richmond Times-Dispatch in Richmond, Virginia. His articles also appeared in the now-defunct NetGuide magazine.

From 1998 to 2010, he was TV editor and critic for the Pittsburgh Post-Gazette, and from 2010 to 2020, he wrote for the paper and its website as TV writer/critic. He is currently with the Pittsburgh Tribune-Review and Trib Total Media as TV writer/columnist. In addition, he freelances regularly for Variety (Hollywood, California), The Seattle Times (Seattle, Washington), The Kansas City Star (Kansas City, Missouri) and the Richmond Times-Dispatch (Richmond, Virginia). He's also had articles published in Portland Monthly, Pittsburgh Magazine, Shady Avenue, The Philadelphia Inquirer and The Spokesman-Review (Spokane, Washington). He is a past president of the Television Critics Association and currently TCA's hotel coordinator.

=== Other works ===
While at the Times-Dispatch, Owen helped create "inSync," a section for teen readers that preceded the boy band of the same name (but slightly different spelling).

Owen also wrote Gen X TV: The Brady Bunch to Melrose Place (Syracuse University Press, March 1997). The nonfiction book talks about shows that members of the Generation X age group grew up watching and the shows they watched in the 1990s. He was featured in the 2016 National Geographic Channel series "Generation X" as one of the experts interviewed on Gen X. He was also a talking head TV expert in CNN's "The Nineties" (2017).
