= Bride to Be =

Bride to Be may refer to:

- Bride to Be (film), a 1975 Spanish film
- Bride to Be (magazine), an Australian bridal magazine
- Bride-to-be

== See also ==
- Brides to Be, a 1934 British comedy film
