= NetGuide =

- Editor: Jacques-Pierre Dumas
- Former editors: Nigel Horrocks, Rebecca Rallo, Jonathan Cotton, Shannon Williams
- Publisher: Techday Ltd
- First issue: September 1996
- Final issue: Early 2014 (now online)
- Company: Computers; Technology
- Country: New Zealand
- Based in: Auckland
- Language: English
- Website: https://netguide.co.nz/

NetGuide is a live news website with weekly email newsletters dedicated to New Zealand consumers, covering technology news, product reviews and buying advice. Netguide.co is the largest site in the Techday network.

== History and profile ==
NetGuide was launched in September 1996 by an independent Auckland-based publisher, then owned by Australian Consolidated Press (ACP) 2003 to 2008, then shifted to Action Media. It is now owned exclusively by Techday Ltd. Originally entirely internet focused, it developed to cover wider computer, telecommunications, and technology issues. The magazine competed with IDG's New Zealand PC World and ran the annual NetGuide Web Awards.

In early 2014, NetGuide and the entire Techday network discontinued all print publications and moved to exclusively online content.

In April 2017, NetGuide was renamed as FutureFive NZ.

== Australian edition ==
The magazine launched a version for the Australian market, Australian NetGuide, which ran 1996–2009. It competed with NineMSN's apc and IDG's Australian PC World. Now, Australian news is integrated into Netguide's New Zealand website, or published under one of Techday's Australian brands: IT Brief Australia, SecurityBrief Australia, or ChannelLife Australia.
