= Puggy Smalls =

Influencer dog

- Species: Dog
- Breed: Pug
- Sex: Male
- Born: 2014
- Known for: Internet posts
- Owner: Nick Ettridge

Puggy Smalls is a pug living in Kent, UK. Puggy Smalls is a pet influencer, with his owner posting videos of the dog emerging from hiding places such as office drawers, fruit and takeaway boxes.

== History ==
Puggy Smalls, named after rapper Biggie Smalls, has been owned by Nick Ettridge since the dog was eight weeks old. Ettridge began to dress Puggy like a human, posting photos on social media. During Puggy's career, he has worked with brands such as Cadbury and 9GAG. In 2018, Puggy Smalls helped a superfan get engaged by wearing an engagement ring box on his back surprising the couple in a London park.

In summer 2019 the video of Puggy Smalls emerging out of a watermelon had a viral viewing tally of 35 million worldwide, resulting in many celebrity fans and a live TV appearance on Australia's The Morning Show. In the same year, Puggy was hired by Canine Cottages to review holiday properties around the UK.

== Media ==
Puggy has an Instagram following of over 170K, Facebook following of 200k, and over 100 million views from his own page, and over a billion views network-wide, and has been featured on television channels such as Australia's Channel 7, also appeared on Right This Minute TV program, The Telegraph and Take a Break Pets magazine as a featured dog.
