= Heinz Bauer (publisher) =

German billionaire publisher (born 1939)

- Born: Heinz Heinrich Bauer; 28 October 1939 (age 87); Hamburg, Germany
- Education: University of Hamburg
- Known for: chairman of Bauer Media Group
- Spouse: Gudrun Bauer
- Children: 4 daughters, including Yvonne Bauer

Heinz Heinrich Bauer (born 28 October 1939) is a German billionaire publisher. He is the grandson of Johann Andreas Ludolph Bauer, who founded Bauer Media Group.

== Early life ==
After school, he trained as a compositor and printer.

== Career ==
On the death of his father Alfred Bauer in 1984, Heinz Bauer held 96% of the shares. In 2006, he had an estimated net worth of US$1.9 billion.

As a shareholder of the Terms mortgages Rheinboden (AHBR) he turned in 2006 to its sale to the US company Lone Star and criticized in this context, the Federal Financial (BaFin).

In 2007, Bauer bought Emap, one of UK's biggest consumer magazine and radio groups, for £1.14 billion. He mostly acquired the company for its radio business.

In 2010, he transferred 85% of his shares to his youngest daughter Yvonne Bauer, and 5% to each of her older sisters, Mirja, Nicola and Saskia.

== Personal life ==
Bauer and his wife Gudrun have four daughters. Mirja Bauer was editor of the magazine Life & Style. Her husband, the publishing manager Sven-Olof Reimers, has worked as Director of Digital KG in the Bauer Media Group. Yvonne Bauer leads since April 2007, Bauer Media Group, the publisher, she is since 2010. Nicola Bauer is the editor of the magazine InTouch. The youngest daughter Saskia Bauer heads the foreign West.

Bauer and his wife Gudrun donate to charitable causes, particularly the initiative "Riding Against Hunger", Welthungerhilfe.
