= Street Machine =

Street Machine may refer to:

- Street Machine (magazine), an Australian automotive magazine
- Street Machine (album), a 1979 album by Sammy Hagar
