= TechLife =

Australian magazine

- Cover of the final issue (August 2022)
- Editor-in-Chief: Dan Gardiner
- Former editors: Tony Sarno, Glenn Rees, John Hilvert, Geoffrey Ebbs
- Frequency: Monthly
- Circulation: 31,062
- Founded: 1990
- Final issue: August 2022
- Company: Future Australia
- Country: Australia
- Based in: Sydney
- Language: English
- Website: www.techlife.net
- ISSN: 2200-8551

TechLife (formerly PC User) was an Australian general computer magazine, published monthly by Future Australia.

The magazine's regular content consisted of computer hardware and software reviews and previews, technology news and opinion articles, technical how-to guides, and a 'help station' feature where the magazine's contributors provide answers to technical queries from readers. Each issue includes a companion DVD of free full-version software, trial software, game demos and video tutorials, many of which complement articles in the magazine. The magazine also includes software created by contributing writers, including two customised versions of Linux – 'UserOS Ultra', based on Xubuntu 7.10 and aimed at older computers; and 'PCUserOS Extreme', based on the Ubuntu 8.04 'Hardy Heron' and designed for use on more recent computer hardware.

Notable Australian IT journalists who have regularly contributed to the magazine include Rose Vines, Helen Bradley, Darren Yates, Philip Moore, Link Harris, David Flynn, Roulla Yiacoumi, Alex Kidman and Angus Kidman.

== History ==
PC User was first published in 1990 and is Australia's best selling computer magazine, with a monthly circulation of 31,062 as at July–December 2011.

In 2009 a "NetGuide" section was added after the cessation of publication of Australian NetGuide.

In January 2010, PC User celebrated its 20th anniversary with a special anniversary issue.

Long-time editor Glenn Rees (who edited the title from 1992 to 1999 and again from 2002 to 2012) left the magazine in February 2012 as part of a restructure of the Australian Consolidated Press tech magazines including the PC User sister publication APC. The current editor-in-chief of PC User is Tony Sarno, who is also editor-in-chief of APC.

In June 2012, PC User was rebranded and relaunched as TechLife "to address a lack of innovation in the consumer technology publication space" according to the publisher, as well as more clearly delineating the difference between the more mainstream PC User and APC, which is aimed at professionals and "power users". TechLife will be available in print and tablet editions and cover a broader spectrum than PC User, offering editorial on the application of technology to all consumer lifestyle activities, from fitness to entertainment.

In August 2013, TechLife and APC were sold by Bauer Media Group to Future.

In May 2022, TechLife was absorbed into APC, the magazine ceased publication after the August 2022 issue.
