= Yvonne Bauer =

German businesswoman (born 1977)

- Born: 1977 (age 48–49)
- Education: University of Bamberg
- Occupation: Businesswoman
- Known for: CEO and 85% owner of Bauer Media Group
- Spouse: Enno Koch
- Children: 2
- Parent(s): Heinz Bauer; Gudrun Bauer

Yvonne Bauer (born 1977) is a German billionaire businesswoman and the fifth generation leader of Bauer Media Group.

== Early life ==
Yvonne Bauer is the daughter of Heinz Bauer and Gudrun Bauer. She received a bachelor's degree in German philology from the University of Bamberg.

== Career ==
Bauer was apprenticed at publishers Hoffmann and Campe before joining Bauer in 2005. In 2010, she succeeded her father as CEO, after he transferred 85% of the company to her and 5% to each of her older sisters, Mirja, Nicola and Saskia. She also serves as the publisher of Heinrich Bauer Verlag KG.

As of August 2024, Forbes estimated her net worth at US$2.3 billion.

== Personal life ==
In 2014, Bauer married Enno Koch, a German television journalist and producer. They have twins, and live in Hamburg.
