= NGS.ru =

Russian news website

- Native name: Независимые городские сайты (НГС)
- Romanized name: Nezavisimye gorodskie saity (NGS)
- Former name: Novosibirsk City Website (1998–2008)
- Website type: Online newspaper
- Available in: Russian
- Headquarters: 12 Lenin Street, Novosibirsk, Novosibirsk Oblast, Russia
- Owner: Internet Technologies OOO
- Founder: Maxim Sidorkin
- Industry: Journalism
- Parent: Hearst Shkulev Media
- Website: ngs.ru
- Registration: Optional
- Launched: 12 March 1998; 28 years ago (website); 2003; 23 years ago (company)
- Current status: Active

NGS.ru (Note: Russian: НГС, an initialism of Независимые городские сайты (lit. 'Independent City Websites') and until 2008 Новосибирский городской сайт ('Novosibirsk City Website')) is a Russian online newspaper founded in 1998 and based in Novosibirsk. It is a major regional media outlet in the Novosibirsk Oblast by citation index.

NGS.ru is part of Urban Media, a network of Russian regional web portals owned by Hearst Shkulev Media.

== History ==
The history of NGS.ru began on 12 March 1998, when Maxim Sidorkin, who was earning his living selling compact discs, created it using a simple FrontPage editor. It became one of the first 100 websites hosted in Novosibirsk. Sidorkin decided to develop the website as a web portal for residents of Novosibirsk called Novosibirsk City Website (Russian: Новосибирский городской сайт), hoping to attract as many advertisers as possible. In 2001, the site became his main source of income.

In 2003, Sidorkin founded the stock company NGS (registered on 8 August 2003 with assignment of primary state registration number 1035403210325) and recruited its first employees. On 14 September 2007, the news section of the site was registered as a digital mass medium (certificate of registration ЭЛ No. ФС77-29543). In 2007, the company commenced to expand to Krasnoyarsk. At the same time, the website was rebranded, and the name "NGC" began to mean Independent City Websites (Russian: Независимые городские сайты). The sphere of the company's activity was extended to Omsk in 2009, then to Barnaul, Kuzbass and Tomsk in 2010 and to Irkutsk in 2011.

In March 2013, Hearst Shkulev Media bought 75% of NGS's shares. NGS.ru and the company's other sites were subsequently integrated into Hearst Shkulev Media's Urban Media, a network of regional web portals. Prior to the deal on the disposal of the company, in addition to the news section, NGS.ru had many others, such as a car sales announcements section; search sections for real estate, jobs and employees section; a dating section; an online forum; and electronic mail. After its acquisition by Hearst Shkulev Media, most of these sections were spun out into separate websites; NGS kept its news section and ability to publish advertisements.

In 2017, a series of reorganizations within Hearst Shkulev Media began. At the time, NGS.ru was owned by Internet Tehnologies OOO (primary state registration number 1087448005050) and registered as a digital mass medium (certificate of registration ЭЛ No. ФС 77 - 84683 issued on 6 February 2023).

== Activity ==
As a major regional mass media outlet in Novosibirsk, NGS specializes in news related to local events. Its news is often republished by other media outlets.
