= Pacific Magazines =

Australian magazine publisher

- Industry: Magazine Publishing
- Headquarters: Australia
- Owner: Mercury Capital
- Website: pacificmagazines.com.au

Pacific Magazines was a magazine publisher operating in Australia owned by Southern Cross Media Group. It was acquired by Bauer Media Australia in 2020. In June 2020, Mercury Capital acquired Pacific Magazines as part of its purchase of Bauer's former Australian and New Zealand assets.

== History ==
Pacific published leading titles including Australia's best selling magazine Better Homes & Gardens, Women's Health, Men's Health, New Idea, Who, and the nation's leading fashion brand Marie Claire.

It has it roots in the Southdown Press, the publishers of New Idea and long owned by the Murdoch family. When News Corp Australia acquired the Herald & Weekly Times in 1987, the Australasian and Argus titles (Australasian Post, Home Beautiful, Your Garden) were added. Rupert Murdoch spun off his Australian magazine holdings in 1991 into a new company, Pacific Magazines and Printing (PMP).

Seven West Media acquired Pacific Magazines in 2002, leaving PMP as solely a printing business. Two years later, Seven bought Murdoch Magazines, a former corporate sibling in News Corp Australia, from Matt Handbury.

In 2016, Pacific Magazines took its digital assets back from Yahoo7 and subsequently launched multiple digital products across Fashion, Entertainment and Home & Food.

In 2017, Pacific unveiled its all new "premium user experience" digital offerings for Marie Claire and Women's Health. This was subsequently rolled across their digital network including Who, InStyle, Men's Health, Home Beautiful, New Idea, Better Homes & Gardens, Girlfriend and New Idea Food.

In October 2019 Seven West Media announced, that subject to gaining Australian Competition & Consumer Commission approval, it had agreed to sell Pacific Magazines to Bauer Media Australia. The sale was completed in May 2020. In June 2020, Bauer Media Australia including Pacific Magazines was sold to Mercury Capital.

== Publications ==
Anime

- K-Zone, a monthly children's magazine highlighting toys, gaming, anime, sport and entertainment.

Fashion & Beauty

- Marie Claire Australia, a monthly women's fashion magazine, based on the original French version founded in 1937
- InStyle, a monthly fashion, lifestyle and entertainment magazine, based on the American magazine
- Men's Health, a monthly men's lifestyle magazine, based on the American title of the same name
- Women's Health, a monthly women's lifestyle magazine, the international version based on the American magazine
- BeautyCrew.com.au, the leading digital beauty offering providing how to's, news and product reviews.

Entertainment

- Girlfriend, a monthly magazine for teenage girls.
- New Idea, a weekly women's magazine.
- That's Life!, a weekly lifestyle magazine.
- Who, a weekly celebrity magazine, sister to the United States weekly People.
- PracticalParenting.com.au, a premium digital parenting destination with a pull out parenting section in the New Idea magazine.

Home & Food

- All Recipes, Australia's best user created recipes web property.
- Better Homes & Gardens, a monthly home/lifestyle magazine and Australia's best selling magazine.
- Diabetic Living, a bi-monthly lifestyle magazine aimed at people suffering from diabetes.
- Family Circle, a women's magazine aimed at mothers, based on the American publication.
- Home Beautiful, a monthly home decorating magazine.
- NewIdeaFood.com.au, a new gourmet food online product offering recipes with topical food news.

Previous titles

- Bride to Be, a bridal magazine. (print edition ceased publication in September 2016)
- Famous, a weekly celebrity tabloid magazine. (print edition ceased publication 2016)
- Feast, a monthly magazine in partnership with SBS Food (ceased publication in 2015)
- Prevention, a monthly healthy lifestyle magazine for women over 40 (the last issue by the company was published in December 2016)
- Your Garden, a quarterly gardening magazine (ceased publication in August 2016)
