= Stephen Orr (garden writer) =

American horticulturalist

Stephen Orr is an American author, magazine editor, and horticulturalist. He is the former editor-in-chief at Better Homes and Gardens. He was the editorial director for gardening for Martha Stewart Living, and was the garden editor for House & Garden and Domino magazines. He currently gardens on Cape Cod and writes about gardening and food for the Provincetown Independent.

== Books ==
- Tomorrow’s Garden: Design and Inspiration for a New Age of Sustainable Gardening (Rodale, 2011)
- Nelson Byrd Woltz: Garden, Park, Community, Farm (Princeton Architectural Press, 2013)
- The New American Herbal (Clarkson Potter, 2014)
- The Gardener’s Mindset: Connecting with Nature Through Plants (Clarkson Potter, 2026)
