= Bride to Be (magazine) =

Australian periodical, introduced 1968

- Cover from May 2011
- Editor: Sarah Stevens
- Categories: Women's magazine
- Circulation: 73,000
- First issue: December 1968
- Final issue: 2016 (print)
- Company: Pacific Magazines
- Country: Australia
- Website: www.bridetobe.com.au

Bride to Be is an Australian bridal magazine published by Pacific Magazines, owned by Seven West Media. Bride to Be includes articles about wedding ideas and practical for planning a wedding.

== History ==
Bride to Be was first published in December 1968 by Warwick Boyce Publishing Pty Ltd which later became David Boyce Publishing in 1980. In 1974 the magazine went tri annual, and in 1977 it was being published quarterly, and continued with this schedule. In 1995 the title moved to IPC and then Time Inc. in 2003 which was eventually purchased by Pacific Magazinesin 2007.

Notable cover models include Nicole Kidman in 1984, Jackie O in 2001, Bec Hewitt in 2004 and Brooke Satchwell in 1999.

Bride to Be sponsors an annual Bride of the Year competition.

The magazine's circulation rose significantly in 2001, and in 2013, Bride to Be was ranked number one in Australia in its category, with a readership of 73,000 and had been so for ten issues.

In 2016 the publisher, Pacific Magazines, announced that Bride-to-Be would no longer be produced as a print magazine, and would become a digital-only publication.

== Cost of Love survey ==
Since 1997, the magazine has biannually presented its Cost of Love survey results. The survey looks at national wedding trends and costs, including the average cost of a wedding in Australia. The average age of the brides responding to the survey is 30. The magazine's 2013 survey found that the average cost of a wedding in Australia was $54,294 This figure has increased 92% in the past decade.

Findings from Cost of Love have been reported and discussed on Today Tonight, TVNZ, Adelaide Now, The Daily Telegraph, Sydney Morning Herald, news.com.au, Lifestyle You. The accuracy of the numbers provided in the survey has been questioned, since they are considerably higher than estimates from other sources. Journalists have pointed out that readers of the magazine who participate in the survey may be mainly those planning expensive weddings, rather than a representative sample of brides-to-be.
