= Australian NetGuide =

Australian magazine

- The final issue of Australian NetGuide in 2009
- First issue: 1998
- Final issue: 8 July 2009
- Company: ACP Magazines

Australian NetGuide was an Australian magazine originally established in Australia by OzEmail as that Internet service provider's member publication. It existed from 1998 to 2009.

== History and profile ==
Australian NetGuide was started by New Zealand-based company Industrial Press in 1998. It was transformed into an A5 magazine targeting home internet users. Australian and New Zealand NetGuide magazine were sold to Australian Consolidated Press in 2003.

In 2004 the circulation of Australian NetGuide was 43,600 copies. It was 16,047 copies just before its closure.

The magazine ceased publication in 2009, merging with PC User (which became TechLife before discontinuing in 2022). NetGuide's last issue appeared on 8 July 2009 and its final editor was Gail Lipscombe.
