= Better Homes and Gardens (magazine) =

American magazine

- Cover of the December 2024 issue (US)
- Editor-in-chief: Carrie Boyd
- Categories: home economics, interior design
- Frequency: 12 issues/year
- Total circulation: 7,624,910 (2015)
- Founded: 1922; 104 years ago
- Company: People Inc. (US); Are Media (Australia)
- Country: United States
- Based in: Des Moines, Iowa
- Language: English
- Website: bhg.com (US) bhg.com.au (Australia)
- ISSN: 0006-0151

Better Homes and Gardens (stylized as Better Homes & Gardens and abbreviated as BHG) is, as of September 1st, 2025, the sixth most widely circulated magazine in the United States. Better Homes and Gardens focuses on interests regarding homes, cooking, gardening, crafts, healthy living, decorating, and entertaining. The magazine is published 12 times per year by People Inc. (formerly Meredith Corporation).

== Early years ==
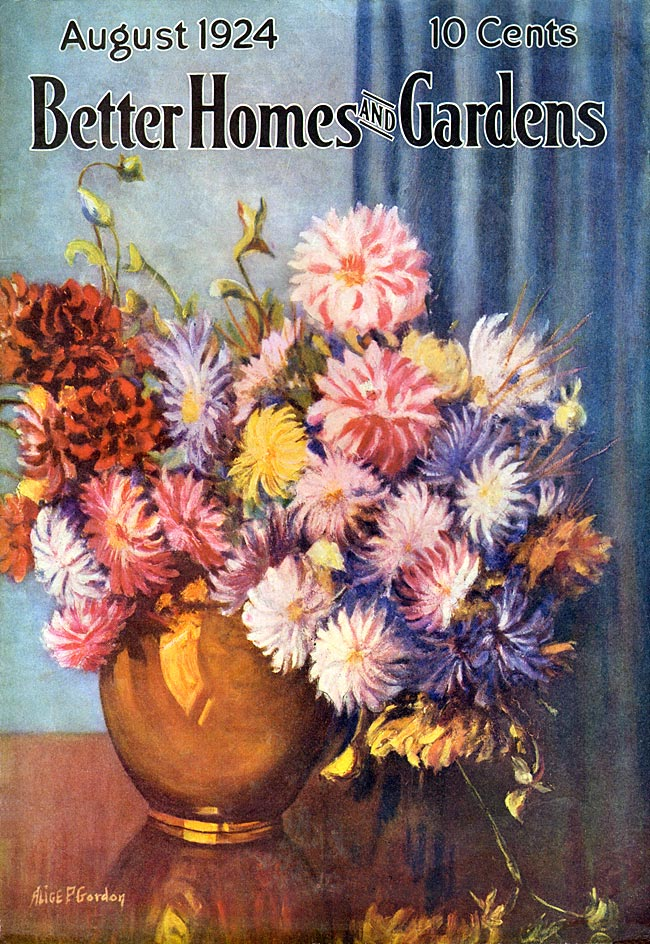
Cover of August 1924 issue, the first under the Better Homes and Gardens name

Better Homes and Gardens was founded in 1922 by Edwin Meredith, who had served as the United States secretary of agriculture under Woodrow Wilson and had previously founded the magazine Successful Farming. The original title was Fruit, Garden and Home. The name was changed to Better Homes and Gardens beginning with the August 1924 issue.

The first editor for the magazine was Chesla C. Sherlock. One of Sherlock's contributions was an article series on "Homes of Famous Americans", which was also published as a series of books.

Better Homes and Gardens is one of the "Seven Sisters", a group of women's service magazines.

== Brand extension ==
The Meredith Corporation publishes a number of books on home economics and gardening under the BH&G brand, the best known of which is the Better Homes and Gardens New Cook Book, colloquially known as the "Red Plaid" book. Now in its 15th edition (published in August 2010), the Red Plaid was originally published in 1930. Meredith also publishes the New Junior Cookbook for children learning to cook.

The magazine's title was used by Meredith's real estate arm, which was sold and then called GMAC Real Estate. In October 2007, Meredith entered a 50-year licensing agreement with Realogyn to license the Better Homes and Gardens name to Better Homes and Gardens Real Estate. The company is based in Parsippany, New Jersey, and has offices across the country.

Meredith's broadcasting division began producing the television program Better in the fall of 2007, which is a lifestyle show which has a mix of content from Meredith's various magazine titles (included BH&G), consumer advice and celebrity interviews. The program would air on stations owned by Meredith, Scripps, Fisher and LIN TV groups. Some Meredith-owned stations produce their own local edition of Better. The show was canceled in May 2015.

The brand offered a line of home decor products through a partnership with Home Interiors and Gifts, a company based on direct selling.

== Overseas editions ==
The Australian edition of the magazine is published by Are Media, the successor to the former Bauer Media Australia which acquired Pacific Magazines in 2020.

== References in popular culture ==
Mad Magazine published a satire in March 1958 (issue #38) titled "Bitter Homes and Gardens," including articles titled "They Built Their House on a Lot 22 Inches Wide" (A house built between two office buildings), a "How-The..." department which suggests putting a lawn on rollers so one can drag it "to a nearby spot where it's raining", and an article on how to convert a second bathroom into a basement (with a photo of the author's wife, who has just stepped out of the shower and covers herself with a towel). The magazine was also spoofed in the 1970s as "Bitter Homes and Garbage", in a set of "Crazy Magazine Covers" produced by Fleer.

In an episode of I Love Lucy, Lucy jokes about the magazine as, "Better Homes and Garbage" when she and Ethel redecorate Lucy's apartment.

An episode of The Simpsons The Springfield Files showed a brief shot of a magazine entitled Better Homes Than Yours.

Better Homes and Gardens is mentioned in the song "I Save Cigarette Butts" by Daniel Johnston.

In Little Shop of Horrors Audrey sings in "Somewhere That's Green" about how her dream house is a "picture out of Better Homes and Gardens magazine."

In country recording artist Miranda Lambert's 2010 hit single titled "The House That Built Me", there is a verse that says, "Mama cut out pictures of houses for years from Better Homes and Gardens magazine".

Brandon Flowers mentions the magazine in the song "The Clock Was Tickin" from his 2010 album Flamingo.

The Shel Silverstein song "One's on the Way" (made popular by Loretta Lynn) has the line "'Better Homes and Gardens' shows a modern way to live."

"Bitter Groans and Gardens" is a SpongeBob SquarePants episode from season 17, playing on the magazine's title.

In Se7en, Detective Mills (Brad Pitt) sarcastically mentions Better Homes And Gardens when he's looking at the inside of the gluttony victim's house.

== Editors ==
- Chesla Sherlock (1922–1927)
- Elmer T. Peterson (1927–1937)
- Frank W. McDonough (1938–1950)
- J. E. Ratner (1950–1952)
- Hugh Curtis (1952–1960)
- Bert Dieter (1960–1967)
- James A. Riggs (1967–1970)
- James Autry (1970–1979)
- Gordon Greer (1979–1983)
- David Jordan (1984–1993)
- Jean LemMon (1993–2001)
- Karol DeWulf Nickell (2001–2006)
- Gayle Butler (2006–2015)
- Stephen Orr (2015–2024)

== See also ==
- Better Homes and Gardens Real Estate
