= GMAC Real Estate =

American real estate franchised broker

- Industry: Real estate
- Founded: 1998; 28 years ago
- Fate: Acquired by Brookfield Asset Management
- Successor: Real Living

GMAC Real Estate was a real estate franchised broker. It had 13,000 agents. In 2008, it was acquired by Brookfield Asset Management and in 2012, it merged into HomeServices of America.

== History ==
GMAC Real Estate was founded in 1998, when GMAC (now Ally Financial) bought the Better Homes and Gardens Real Estate brand from Meredith Corporation.

In 2001, John Bearden was named president and CEO of GMAC Home Services, the parent company of GMAC Real Estate.

In 2002, the company ranked 6th in transaction volume among U.S. real estate companies.

In 2006, the company awarded franchises in the St. Louis area and in the Denver area.

In 2008, GMAC Home Services LLC was acquired by Brookfield Asset Management.

In 2009, Brookfield merged the company into its Real Living division.

In 2012, HomeServices of America, an affiliate of Berkshire Hathaway, acquired Real Living.
