= That's Life (magazine) =

British women's magazine

- Categories: Women's weekly magazine
- Frequency: Weekly (Thursday)
- Total circulation: 173,472 (2019)
- Founded: 1995; 31 years ago
- Company: Bauer Media Group
- Country: United Kingdom
- Based in: London
- Language: English
- Website: www.thatslife.co.uk

That's Life (stylised as that's life!) is a British women's magazine founded in 1995 and published by H Bauer UK, a subsidiary of the German Bauer Media Group on a weekly basis, with new issues released every Thursday. The current editor Sophie Hearsey has been in the position since 2010, joining from sister title Take a Break replacing Jo Checkley when Checkley left to join rival publication Love It!, owned by Burda Media.

The magazine focuses on a mixture of reader submitted "true life" stories, as well as women's health and lifestyle features, puzzles and competitions, following a similar format to sister title Take a Break, and rival publications such as Chat and Pick Me Up.

According to the Audit Bureau of Circulations, during the period between July and December 2019, the circulation of That's Life was 173,472.

== Complaints ==
In 2015 the title was censured by the Independent Press Standards Organisation after ruling that the magazine had breached the clause on accuracy in the editor's code of practice, this was as a result of a complaint by Leanne Owens, who had submitted a story to the magazine regarding her difficult pregnancy, but upon publication in an October 2014 issue, the story was found to have several falsities, and was not faithful to what was allegedly discussed with the publication's journalist. Despite maintaining that care was taken to provide an accurate story, That's Life! issued a correction and an apology.
