= Hemmets Veckotidning =

Women's magazine in Sweden

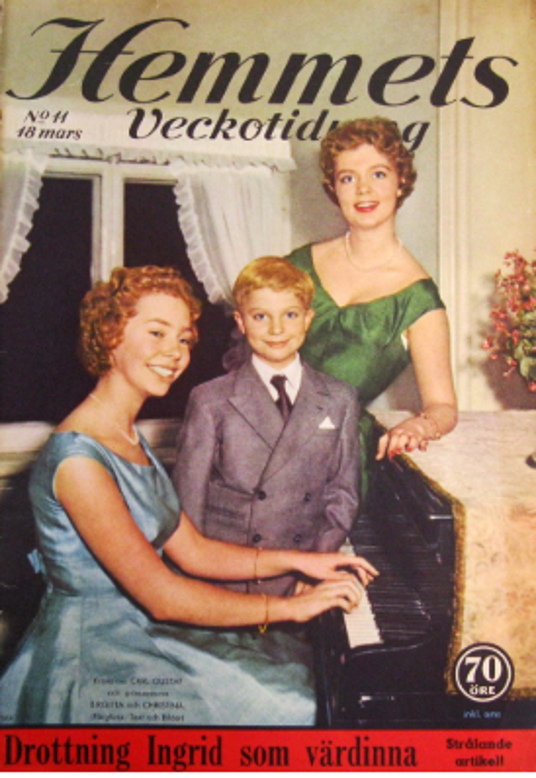
- Categories: Women's magazine
- Frequency: Weekly
- Publisher: Aller Förlag AB
- Founder: Vitus and Paula Petersson
- Founded: 1929
- Company: Aller Media
- Country: Sweden
- Based in: Malmö
- Language: Swedish
- Website: Hemmets Veckotidning
- ISSN: 0345-4630
- OCLC: 225843076

Hemmets Veckotidning (Swedish: The Home Weekly Magazine) is a weekly family magazine published in Malmö, Sweden. Founded in 1929, it is one of the oldest magazines in the country.

== History and profile ==
Hemmets Veckotidning was founded in Malmö in 1929. The founders were Vitus and Paula Petersson. The magazine is part of Aller Media and is published by Aller Förlag AB on a weekly basis. The company acquired the magazine in 1983. Its headquarters is in Malmö, but it was formerly based in Helsingborg.

Hemmets Veckotidning targets women aged between 25–59 years. It features articles on cooking, baking, crafts, fashion, beauty, and interior decoration. Ulla Cocke was the long-term editor-in-chief of Hemmets Veckotidning. Kurt Ekenberger was among its regular contributors. The magazine is also distributed in other Scandinavian countries.

== Circulation ==
Hemmets Veckotidning enjoyed the peak circulation of 455,000 copies both in 1957 and in 1958. It sold 211,500 copies in 2007 and became the third largest magazine in Sweden. It was the third best-selling magazine in Scandinavian countries with a circulation of 182,300 copies in 2013.
