= Jagran Josh Plus =

Indian magazine

Jagran Josh Plus is an Indian weekly magazine published by Jagran Prakashan Limited. According to the Indian Readership Survey in 2014, it is one of the top magazines published in India.
