= Take Five (revue) =

1957 musical revue

Take Five was a musical revue by Julius Monk performed in 1957. Its songs included "Witchcraft" by Michael Brown, performed by Gerry Matthews.

Jonathan Tunick was credited as a co-composer, and Stephen Sondheim also participated.

(There is a different song, also entitled "Witchcraft", not associated with this revue. It was performed by Frank Sinatra, and was written by Cy Coleman).
