= NW (magazine) =

Australian women's magazine

- Cover from September 2013 featuring Kim Kardashian
- Editor: Zoë Barnes
- Categories: Women's magazine
- Frequency: Weekly
- Circulation: 200,000
- Publisher: Are Media
- Founded: 1993
- Final issue: July 2020
- Company: Are Media
- Country: Australia
- Based in: Sydney
- Language: English
- Website: nwonline.com.au

NW (formerly New Weekly) was a weekly magazine (typically 110 pages) published in Australia by Bauer Media. It contained articles about media celebrities, Hollywood gossip, clothing, makeup, dieting, and entertainment. In July 2020, the magazine was included in the sale of Bauer Media Australia to Mercury Capital, which closed NW down due to the economic effects of the COVID-19 pandemic.

== History and profile ==
The magazine was started in 1993 under the title New Weekly by then Australian Consolidated Press executive Richard Walsh, with a renaming to NW in 1998. The magazine was headquartered in Sydney. The publisher was Bauer Media Pty Ltd. Circulation was around 200,000.

NW won the Australian Magazine of the Year Award in 2006.

In mid-July 2020, NW was acquired by Mercury Capital, which purchased several of Bauer Media's former Australian and New Zealand brands. Shortly later, Mercury Capital liquidated NW, citing the effects of the COVID-19 pandemic on its publications' advertising revenue.
