= Le Bel Age =

French language Quebec magazine

Le Bel Âge is a French language Quebec magazine aimed at retirees and those over 50. It covers topics such as travel, entertainment, books, and health and seniors rights.

The magazine was founded in 1987 by publisher Francine Tremblay, who thought that people including her 58-year-old mother were lacking a publication for their lifestyles. An English language version called Good Times was started in 1990.

As of 2012, its print circulation was 129,719, the 26th highest circulation magazine in Canada. In 2014, TVA Group, a subsidiary of Quebecor, bought Le Bel Âge and fourteen other magazines from Transcontinental.
