= That's Life! (Australian magazine) =

that's life!
- that's life! magazine (cover May 2014)
- Editor: Sarah Firth
- Former editors: Linda Smith
- Categories: Women's magazine
- Frequency: Weekly
- Founded: 1994; 32 years ago
- Company: Are Media
- Country: Australia
- Based in: Sydney
- Language: English
- Website: www.thatslife.com.au
- ISSN: 1321-7690

that's life! (stylised that's life! and usually abbreviated to tl!) is an Australian entertainment and lifestyle weekly magazine by Are Media. It is not related to the United Kingdom magazine publication of the same title, which is published by Bauer Media Group. tl! is a reality-based magazine, as well as containing puzzles, recipes, health, beauty and fashion advice.

In January 2019, that's life! added a monthly edition of the magazine to its publication schedule. The magazine also produces a podcast titled "How I Survived."
