= Le Parisien Week-end =

Le Parisien Week-end or Aujourd'hui en France Week-end
- Type: periodical literature (every Friday)
- Format: magazine
- Owner: LVMH
- Founder(s): Jean Hornain (ex CEO of Le Parisien & Aujourd'hui en France)
- Publisher: LPM
- Editor-in-chief: Yolaine de Chanaud - Christine Monin
- General manager: Nicolas Charbonneau
- Founded: 2012
- Language: French
- City: 10 boulevard de Grenelle, Paris 15e
- Country: France
- Circulation: 420,126 (as of 2013)
- ISSN: 2263-2506
- Website: leparisien.fr/week-end

Le Parisien Week-end, which is named Aujourd'hui-en-France Week-end outside Paris, is a weekly supplement sold on Fridays with the newspaper Le Parisien (or with the newspaper Aujourd'hui-en-France outside Paris) since September 2012. Distributed weekly to approximately 420,000 copies, this magazine is published by the company LPM, a subsidiary of Parisien.

Before its name change in 2017, it was titled Le Parisien Magazine or Aujourd'hui-en-France Magazine outside Paris.

== Positioning and Content ==
The magazine was created by Jean Hornain, who then asked Frédéric Allary, former managing director of the cultural weekly Les Inrockuptibles, to create its title.

The magazine aims to be "surprising, respecting our values of rigor, balance, and objectivity," according to Thierry Borsa, then director of editorial content, who was interviewed at the time of the magazine's creation.

The hundred page magazine initially consisted of three sections. The first, titled "Week-end," covered culture, travel, and gastronomy. The second, known as "Grand angle," focused on in-depth subjects: economy, international affairs, society, etc. The third and final section, "Plaisirs," was more consumer-oriented: fashion, beauty, high-tech, etc.

== Notable editions ==
On 19 October 2012, Arnaud Montebourg appeared on the magazine cover wearing a Breton stripe shirt for an in-depth article on "made in France." The feature was awarded the 2013 Editorial Scoop Award, presented by the magazine publishers' union.

In October 2013, for an article on courage in politics, Ségolène Royal was photographed wearing a sort of toga and carrying the French flag, reminiscent of Delacroix's painting Liberty Leading the People. Although she did not make the cover, this image was widely distributed by the media and even parodied.

In January 2014, shortly after her separation from François Hollande, Valérie Trierweiler opened up to Parisien Magazine during a trip to India, explaining, among other things: "I did not like the gilded opulence of the Élysée Palace."
