= Street Machine (magazine) =

- The issues of Street Machine from 2009
- Editor: Andrew Broadley
- Categories: Automobile magazine
- Frequency: monthly
- Publisher: Are Media
- Founded: 1981; 45 years ago
- Company: Out There Group
- Country: Australia
- Based in: Sydney
- Language: English
- Website: www.whichcar.com.au/streetmachine

Street Machine is an Australian automotive magazine published by Are Media featuring customised cars from every era.

== Content ==
Street Machine contains many sections, from letters sent in by readers, to articles on feature cars and technical issues. The feature cars are mostly Australian and American muscle cars from the 1960s to the 2000s, while occasionally a hot rod or rat rod will feature. Cars such as a Datsun 1600 or an Austin A30 also make rare appearances.

== History ==
While Street Machine was originally titled "Van Wheels", its history can be traced back to the Australian Hot Rodding Review, or AHRR, of the 1960s and 1970s. By 1976, AHRR had collapsed, and a magazine called Van Wheels had replaced it. Van Wheels had an irregular publishing frequency and was destined to the same fate as AHRR.

Geoff Paradise, who at age 19 was Editor of AHRR before leaving to work at Hot Rod in the United States, took the failing brand under his wing. His first issue, named Van Wheels & Street Machine. cost $2, and sold 24,500 copies, compared to 60,000 for Wheels and 45,000 for Motor. For the second issue, the magazine was renamed Street Machine & Van Wheels, and by the seventh issue was just called Street Machine in 1981. By this time, the magazine was selling well over 30,000 copies.

Paradise, a charismatic but controversial figure in the Australian V8 culture, left Street Machine in 1985, and went on to launch Performance Street Car, Fast Fours (& Rotaries) and Super Ford, the first one-marque magazine published in Australia. The level of circulation of Street Machine at the time of Paradise's departure was in excess of 50,000 copies.

Paradise's replacement was Phil Scott, a motoring writer from The Sydney Morning Herald. Scott quickly put the skills learnt from time spent in newspapers into Street Machine – increasing publishing frequency from six issues per year to eight and introducing some one-off car giveaways, which included an original A9X Torana and a Ford Falcon GTHO Phase III. This caused sales to reach 120,000 in September 1987.

In 1988, Street Machine started supporting Chic Henry with his then new Summernats Car Festival, by paying for the burnout pad, underwriting the event and signing up as major sponsor. The Street Machine of the Year award also started in 1988.

From 1991 onwards, Street Machine went into a slow decline, losing the number one spot to Wheels in June 1994. The publication continued and Street Machine had several different editors, although they had their eyes set on something similar to Wheels and nothing at all similar to Paradise's original vision of a serious, no-nonsense street-car magazine. When Street Machine started assembling the current editorial team in 2000, sales had fallen well below the 50,000 mark that Paradise had achieved in the mid-eighties. The magazine needed to find a direction.

Street Machine sales were up, apparently, due to a revamped presentation of the magazine. However, it is more likely due to people beginning to show enthusiasm towards the V8 culture, the rise of V8 Supercars (Street Machine had several articles devoted to V8 Supercars at this point) and a new dragstrip had been constructed in Sydney. Street Machine has been publishing monthly since November 2000, and now sells about 65,000 copies, and has over half a million readers as of 2006.

== SummerNats ==
Street Machine is the main sponsor of the automotive show Summernats, which is run at Exhibition Park in Canberra in Canberra, ACT, Australia and features burnouts, drags and car show and shines. Street Machine writes up a Summernats Survival Guide each year as well as a feature article reviewing the car festival, which includes winners of all the major and minor awards, Miss Summernats and a feature article on the Grand Champion car.

== Street Machine of the Year ==
The Street Machine of the Year (SMOTY) award was established in 1988 by Street Machine Magazine. Each August, the staff of Street Machine Magazine vote for their favourite cars from the previous 12 issues and the top 16 become the SMOTY finalists. The finalists cover everything from pure street cars to hot rods, elite hall and drag-strip terrors. Street Machine Magazine's readers then put their vote in and the winner is announced in the December issue. The prize is $15,000 cash and a trophy.

=== Winners ===
Past winners:

Year	Car	Owner
1988	Holden HQ Ute	Alan Cooper
1989	Holden HQ Monaro	Dave Bennett
1990	Holden HQ Ute	Ron Barclay
1991	Ford XY Falcon	Craig Parker
1992	Ford XB Falcon GT	Frank Picollo
1993	1964 Chevrolet Corvette	Frank Rejtano
1994	Holden FJ	Colin Townsend
1995	Ford XA Falcon Coupe	Howard Astill
1995	Holden FJ	Daryl McBeth
1996	1955 Chevrolet Bel Air	John Riksis
1997	Holden HT Monaro	Bill Murfin
1998–99	Holden HJ	Ed Brodie
2000	Holden HQ Monaro	Alan Lucas
2001	1966 Ford Mustang	Gary Myers
2002	1957 Chevrolet Bel Air	Mark Jones
2003	Holden EH	Adam Le Brese
2004	Holden LJ Torana	Steve Leerentveld
2005	1966 Ford Mustang	Gary Myers
2006	Holden HK Monaro	Adam Barbaresco; Donny Kevric
2007	Holden HK Monaro	Mark Sullivan
2008	Holden HQ 1-Tonner	Rob Godfrey
2009	Holden LX Torana	Angela Dow
2010	Plymouth Barracuda	Graeme Cowin
2011	Holden FC	Peter Fitzpatrick; Michelle Fitzpatrick
2013	Ford XR Falcon	Mick Fabar

== Other Street Machine titles ==
- Street Machine Commodores
- Street Machine Fords
- Street Machine Choppers
- Street Machine Hot Rod Annual
- Street Machine Holden Legends
- Street Machine Ford Legends
- Street Machine Muscle Car Legends
- Street Machine Hot Holdens

Note: Street Machine Commodores and Street Machine Fords are unrelated to the two magazines of similar titles, Street Commodores and Street Fords.

== See also ==
- Mullet (haircut)
