= Sng Boh Khim =

Singaporean poet

- Born: 5 February 1950
- Died: 29 August 2006 (aged 56)
- Occupation: Poet
- Years active: 1970s-2000s

Sng Boh Khim (5 February 1950 – 29 August 2006) was a Singaporean poet, particularly notable in the 1970s. He was also the secretary of former Singaporean President Wee Kim Wee.

He became a Christian in his last years and also went by his Christian name Sunny. His poems included Modern Love Stories, Grandfather Stories, Trishaw-Rider, Reviewer Meets Rookie, Good Ching Ming Day and Five Takes and Anthology of Five Poets. He was close to his mentor Edwin Thumboo.

He died from stomach cancer in 2006 and his wife, who survived him along with his four children, published an anthology of his poems Simply This - Simply His Portraits of Sng Boh Khim through Ethos Books on his birthday, 5 February 2009. She unveiled the book at the National Library, Singapore.
