= Gordon-North Sydney Hockey Club =

Australian field hockey club

Gordon North Sydney Hockey Club (GNS) is a hockey club located on the North Shore of Sydney, Australia. The club is a member of the Northern Sydney and Beaches Hockey Association.

The men's team has included many Australian national representatives over the years, including Kookaburras Brent Livermore, Jamie Dwyer, Matthew Butturini and Mark Knowles. The women's team has included Hockeyroos Murphy Allendorf, Grace Jeffery and Anna Flanagan.

In 2020, the men's section of GNS merged with Manly Hockey Club's men's section in order to meet the Sydney Hockey Association's new Premier League structure.

== History ==
North Sydney District Hockey Club was a dominant men's hockey club in Sydney during the 1970s and 1980s, as all seven men's teams played in the Grand Finals in 1979. The club was formed as a result of a merger between the North Sydney Police Boys Club and the Cremorne-North Sydney Hockey Club in 1953, and later merged again with Mosman Hockey Club during the 1959–60 season.

Gordon Hockey Club is thought to have been founded in the 1920s, also as a result of a merger, and this early club played under the banner of Gordon-Wahroongah Hockey Club from 1952 until 1991, when it became incorporated.

In 1991, Gordon North Sydney Hockey Club was formed through a merger of North Sydney District Hockey Club and Gordon Hockey Club. North Sydney was seeing declining members and was unable to pay for necessary infrastructure upgrades, while Gordon had the newly built Ku-ring-gai Hockey Centre and increasing player numbers, but had not yet reached the top men's and women's grades, leading to the merger, which produced a top ranked men's team.

== Success and performance ==
Gordon North Sydney Hockey Club and their respective mergers have had a host of successes since their inception(s), across a variety of awards:

- Gordon North Sydney HC's 1st Grade Women side winning the 2018 1st Grade Premiership (1st Title)
- North Sydney District Hockey Club winning the 1st Grade Premiership in 1979, and Mosman Hockey Club in both 1929 and 1932
- North Sydney District HC winning the 2nd Grade Premierships (Pilgrim Trophy) in 1984, 1982, 1980, 1977–78, 1975, and Mosman HC in 1938
- North Sydney District HC winning the 3rd Grade Premierships (JW Taylor Trophy) in 1984 and 1977, and Cremorne-North Sydney HC in 1952
- North Sydney District HC winning the 4th Grade Premiership (Ron Willington Trophy) in 1985
- Gordon North Sydney HC winning the 5th Grade Men's Premiership (Sydney League 1) in 2011, Gordon HC in 1995-96 and North Sydney District HC in 1986 and 1984
- Gordon North Sydney HC winning the 6th Grade Men's Premierships (Sydney League 2) in 2012 and 2001, and Gordon HC in 1995
- Gordon North Sydney HC winning the 7th Grade Men's Premierships (Sydney League 3/JA Pearce Cup) in 2006-07
- Gordon North Sydney HC winning the 9th Grade Men's Premierships (Sydney League 5/R Skone Trophy) in 2010–11, and North Sydney District HC in 1987-88
- North Sydney District HC winning the PL1&2 Club Premierships in 1984-85 and 1979 (Coinciding with the 1st Grade Premiership)
- Gordon North Sydney HC winning the PL3&4 Club Premiership in 2001
- North Sydney District HC winning the SL1&2 Club Premierships in 1987-88 and 1966, Gordon-Wahroongah HC in 1967, and Gordon North Sydney HC in 2012
- Gordon HC winning the SL3&4 Club Premiership in 1981, and Gordon-Wahroongah HC in 1980
