= L'Ancien d'Algérie =

News magazine in France

- Categories: News magazine
- Frequency: Monthly
- First issue: December 1958
- Country: France
- Based in: Paris
- Language: French

L'Ancien d'Algérie is a French language magazine. The first issue appeared in December 1958. It was the organ of the Fédération nationale des anciens d'Algérie. The magazine is published on a monthly basis and is the official organ of the Fédération nationale des anciens combattants en Algérie, Maroc et Tunisie (National Federation of Veterans of Algeria, Morocco and Tunisia). The editor-in-chief of the magazine which is headquartered in Paris is Michel Sabourdy. It is distributed to the members of the federation as well as non-members. The magazine covers several sections, including news, legal information, letters from readers, etc. In 2020 the magazine had a circulation of 278,697 copies.
