= Naval General Service Medal =

The Naval General Service Medal can refer to one of two medals, each issued by the British government as campaign medals for naval service:

- Naval General Service Medal (1847), awarded for a range of naval actions from 1793–1840
- Naval General Service Medal (1915), intended to cover minor actions for which a full campaign medal would not have been issued

== See also ==
- General Service Medal (1962), which replaced both the Naval General Service Medal and the Army and RAF equivalent
