= Swedish Teachers' Union =

Trade union in Sweden

- Swedish Teachers' Union
- Lärarförbundet
- Headquarters: Stockholm, Sweden
- Location: Sweden
- Members: 230,000
- Key people: Johanna Jaara Åstrand, president Sixten Frixon, general secretary
- Affiliations: SACO, EI
- Website: www.lararforbundet.se

The Swedish Teachers' Union' (Swedish: Lärarförbundet) is the largest teachers' trade union in Sweden. It has a membership of 234,000 and is affiliated with the Swedish Confederation of Professional Associations after voting in 2021 to depart from the Swedish Confederation of Professional Employees. It is also affiliated with Education International.
