= Sng =

Sng or SNG may refer to:

== People ==
- Ayden Sng (born 1993), an actor from Singapore
- Joel Sng (born 1983), an entrepreneur and businessman from Singapore
- Junie Sng (born 1964), a swimmer from Singapore
- Kelvin Sng (born 1974), film director from Singapore
- Larry Sng (born 1979), a politician from Malaysia
- Sng Boh Khim (1950–2006), a poet from Singapore
- Sng Ju Wei (born 1980), a swimmer from Singapore

== Other uses ==
- Satellite news gathering
- Schweizerische Numismatische Gesellschaft, a Swiss numismatic organization
- Singapore, ITU country code
- Single negative metamaterial, with negative permittivity or permeability
- LNER Class A4 4498 Sir Nigel Gresley, a British steam locomotive
- Sit and go poker tournament
- Slovak National Gallery (Slovenská národná galéria)
- SNG, the IATA code for Capitán Av. Juan Cochamanidis Airport in the Santa Cruz Department of Bolivia
- sng, the ISO 639-3 code for the Luba-Sanga language spoken in the Democratic Republic of Congo
- SNG, the National Rail code for Sunningdale railway station in the county of Berkshire, UK
- Sodruzhestvo Nezavisimykh Gosudarstv, the Commonwealth of Independent States in transliterated Russian
- Sprinter New Generation, the new local rolling stock for Nederlandse Spoorwegen
- Substitute natural gas, also known as synthetic natural gas
- Sylloge Nummorum Graecorum, a project to publish ancient Greek coinage
- S.N.G (album), 2012 album
