= Victor Shkulev =

Russian journalist, publisher and media manager (born 1958)

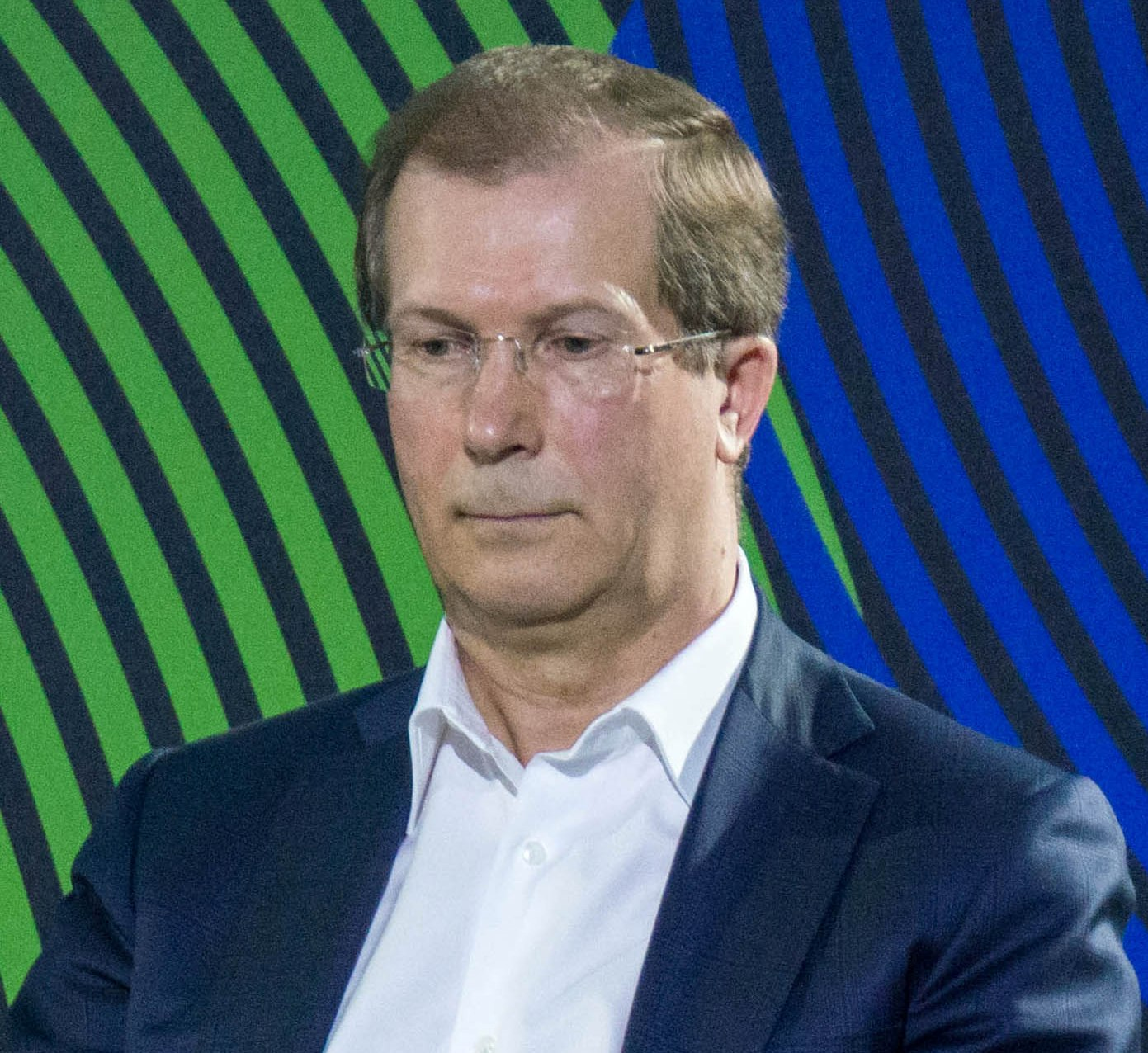
- Viktor Shkulev at MediaMakers 2015 conference
- Born: Victor Mikhailovich Shkulev; April 13, 1958 (age 67); Chita, Russian SFSR

Victor Mikhailovich Shkulev (Russian: Ви́ктор Миха́йлович Шкулёв; born 13 April 1958) is a Russian journalist, publisher, media manager. He is the president of Hearst Shkulev Media (Elle (magazine), Maxim, Antenna-Telesem, Hearst Shkulev Digital). Entered the top five most influential media managers post-Soviet Russia by the magazine "Career" and the weekly newspaper "New Look". Deputy Chairman of FIPP.

== Education ==
- In 1981 have graduated from Irkutsk State University.
- Post-graduate education in the Academy of Social Sciences (CLI).
- In 1991 in his thesis on the theory of law, PhD.

== Career ==
- 1992 - 1993 - in charge of the legal department in the "Komsomolskaya Pravda", and later - CFO, and - CEO newspaper and then CEO Komsomolskaya Pravda Publishing House.
- 1993 - 1997. - General Director of "Komsomolskaya Pravda".
- 1995 - 2011 - the president 'ID Hachette Filipacchi Shkulev' '.
- 1997 - 1998 - Director General of Foreign 'Komsomolskaya Pravda - A group of "Today."
- Since 1998 - Chairman of the Board of Directors 'ID InterMediaGroup'.
- 2011–present - president of "Hearst Shkulev Media»
- Deputy Chairman of FIPP (International Federation of the Periodical Press), a member of the Management Board of the Guild of Press Publishers (HIPD), chairman of the Non-Commercial Partnership "Publishing Initiative."

== Personal life ==
The eldest daughter Natalia Shkuleva (born 31 May 1980), a publisher of magazine Elle (Russian edition), who is married to Andrey Malakhov, Russian showman, publisher "StarHit" Magazine.
