= GSN =

GSN may refer to:

- Game Show Network, an American television channel
- Gay Star News, a British news website
- Garston railway station (Hertfordshire), a railway station in Watford, Hertfordshire (by National Rail station code)
- Gelsolin
- Gigabyte System Network, a computer networking technology
- Global SchoolNet, an American educational organization
- Global Seismographic Network
- Goal Structuring Notation, a graphical argument notation used in safety cases
- Nema language
- Saipan International Airport, in the Northern Mariana Islands (FAA LID)
- Yashica Electro 35 GSN, a camera
