= Take a Break (magazine) =

British women's magazine

- Editor: Rebecca Fleming
- Categories: Women's weekly magazine
- Frequency: Weekly (Thursday)
- Publisher: Bauer
- Total circulation: 416,695 (2019)
- First issue: 1 March 1990; 36 years ago
- Country: United Kingdom
- Based in: London
- Language: English
- Website: takeabreak.co.uk
- ISSN: 0953-0983

Take a Break is a British women's magazine founded in 1990 and published by H Bauer UK, a subsidiary of the German Bauer Media Group on a weekly basis, with new issues released every Thursday. The launch editor was Lori Miles and within one year it was selling a million copies per week, making it the top selling magazine in the UK. The current editor is Rebecca Fleming, having taken over the role after the resignation of John Dale in 2010. Dale had been editor since 1991.

According to the Audit Bureau of Circulations, during the period between July and December 2019, the circulation of Take a Break was 416,695 it is the best selling women's weekly magazine in the United Kingdom, and in 2019, its circulation was nearly twice that of the next best seller, TI Media's Woman's Weekly, despite a year on year drop in circulation of -8%.

The magazine focuses on a mixture of reader submitted "true life" stories, as well as women's health and lifestyle features, puzzles and competitions, following a similar format to sister title That's Life, and rival publications such as Chat and Pick Me Up.

== Companion publications ==
=== Monthly spin-off titles ===
- Fate & Fortune
- Fiction Feast
- Take a Break Makes launched March 2019.
- Take a Break Monthly
- My Favourite Recipes launched 2011, closed 2019.
- Take a Break Pets launched June 2019.
- Take a Break Super Savers launched December 2019.

The magazine also lends its name to a large number of monthly Puzzle magazines, including Take a Crossword launched in 1993, and compilations of arroword, codebreaker, crossword, sudoku, wordsearch and mixed puzzles spread over several formats.
