= SGN =

SGN can refer to:

- SGN (company), a gas distribution company operating in Scotland and southern England
- Samsung Galaxy Note, a series of mobile phones
- Postal code for San Ġwann, Malta
- Seattle Gay News, owner of the sgn.org domain
- Sélection de Grains Nobles, a French term for sweet wines made from grapes affected by noble rot
- Some Good News, a YouTube series
- Station code for South Greenford railway station, London, England
- IATA code for Tan Son Nhat International Airport, Ho Chi Minh City, Vietnam

== Mathematics ==
- sgn(x), the sign function
- sgn(σ), the signature of a permutation
