= NSG =

NSG may refer to:

== Businesses ==
- Nippon Sheet Glass, a Japanese glass manufacturer
- NetWare Systems Group, Novell's defunct operating system division

== Government and military ==
- National Security Guard, a federal counterterrorism force in India
- National Street Gazetteer, a database of all streets in England and Wales
- Naturschutzgebiet, a nature protection category in Germany
- Nebraska State Guard, active during World War II and the Vietnam War
- Nordic Support Group, a multinational peacekeeping force
- Nuclear Suppliers Group, an international export regulation body

== Places ==
- Northampton School for Girls, a high school in Northampton, England
- New Southgate railway station, London (by station code)

== Other uses ==
- NSG (group), a British music collective
- NSG mouse, an immunodeficient laboratory mouse strain
- North Sea Gas, natural gas from Europe's North Sea oil field
