= Woman's Day (Australian magazine) =

Australian women's magazine

- Woman's Day magazine from 2014
- Editor: Joshua Joynes
- Categories: Women's magazine
- Frequency: Weekly
- Circulation: 320,398 (July – September 2014)
- Publisher: Are Media
- Founded: 1948; 78 years ago
- First issue: 16 August 1948
- Company: Are Media
- Country: Australia
- Based in: Sydney
- Language: English
- Website: www.nowtolove.com.au/womansday
- ISSN: 0043-7328

Woman's Day is an Australian women's magazine published by Are Media. It is one of Australia's most widely read weekly magazines as of June 2023.

== History and profile ==
Woman's Day, in Australia, was founded on August 16, 1948. The magazine focused on celebrity stories, fashion trends, creative cooking, advice, fiction, medical tips and current events. The first cover was artwork featuring a child offering up a pink hyacinth snipped from her mother's favorite pot plant, sending a message to readers to "come and join the fun".

In 1950 the magazine gained Alice Mabel Jackson, previously employed by The Australian Women's Weekly, as an editor. Jackson moved to Melbourne to take on this role.

Originally printed and published by Joseph Swanson Wilkinson of Toorak, Victoria for Cologravure Publications (The Herald & Weekly Times Limited), the magazine subsequently became part of John Fairfax and Sons in 1956. ACP Magazines later acquired Fairfax Magazines. ACP Magazines was owned by Nine Entertainment Co, which owns Australian television network Nine Network. Because of this, Woman's Day often featured many stories either based on or in partnership with a Nine Network program, such as A Current Affair. The magazine became part of Bauer Media Group in 2012, after Nine Entertainment Co experienced financial difficulties. Woman's Day is published weekly by Bauer Media Pty Limited and is headquartered in Sydney.

Aimed at women aged 25 to 54, it includes news, gossip, interviews, lifestyle and recipes.

Sales figures, readership and advertising revenue have fallen significantly, down from 405,000 weekly sales in 2010 to 330,000 in March 2014. Readership fell another 14.6% in the year ended 2014.

In early April 2020, Bauer Media Australia announced that it would be closing Woman's Day as well as several Australian and New Zealand brands including The Australian Women's Weekly and New Zealand Woman's Weekly in response to the economic downturn caused by the COVID-19 pandemic in Australia and New Zealand.

On June 17, 2020, Australian investment company Mercury Capital acquired Woman's Day as part of its purchase of Bauer Media's Australian and New Zealand assets.

In late September 2020, Mercury Capital rebranded Bauer Media as Are Media.

== Controversies ==
In 2007, the magazine settled out of court with New Zealand television presenter Charlotte Dawson, who had sued the magazine over its coverage of her divorce.

The magazine underwent significant layoffs in 2008.

In November 2013, Woman's Day came under fire from its readers after a story featuring Catherine, Duchess of Cambridge took issue with her appearance by comparing a photo of her before having her baby and after with the headline "What's happened to Kate?" Criticism suggested that women who have just had a baby often look tired, and she was not wearing makeup in the second image like she was in the first.

In 2014, television presenter Grant Denyer began legal proceedings against the magazine after it claimed he and his wife were in a rehab facility in Thailand for methamphetamine addiction. Denyer claimed they had visited a rehab facility, but it was not for drug issues, and reaffirmed they did not have a drug addiction. The magazine backed the story saying Denyer's friends were their sources for the story.

In 2014, Woman's Day was criticized on the Australian Broadcasting Corporation's Media Watch, in which it was described as "garbage journalism" for the use of sensationalist headlines and content.

== See also ==
- List of Australian magazines
