= Hearst Shkulev Media =

Russian media company

- Company type: Private
- Industry: Mass media
- Founded: Moscow, Russia (March 4, 1998)
- Founder: Victor Shkulev
- Headquarters: Moscow, Russia
- Divisions: Regional network; Lifestyle websites
- Website: shkulevholding.ru

Hearst Shkulev Media is a joint venture between the U.S.-based Hearst Corporation and Russian businessman Victor Shkulev. The company publishes magazines such as ELLE, Maxim, Marie Claire, Starhit, and Antenna Telesem, as well as regional websites.

== History ==
In 1995, Victor Shkulev created the modern publishing group Hachette Flipacchi Shkulev. Viktor Shkulev owned 49% of the shares.

In 2011, the French partner sold their share to Hearst Corporation. The joint company was named Hearst Shkulev Media.

== Regional network ==
Shkulev Media Holding Regional network is a network of online media in Russia.

== Lifestyle websites ==
The holding publishes the magazines Marie Claire, Psychologies, Vokrug sveta, and Antenna-Telesem.
