= Bauer Media Group =

German multimedia conglomerate

Heinrich Bauer Verlag KG
- Trade name: Bauer Media Group
- Type: Private Kommanditgesellschaft
- Industry: Media
- Founded: 1875; 151 years ago
- Headquarters: Hamburg, Germany
- Area served: Worldwide
- Key people: Yvonne Bauer (CEO); Vivian Mohr (COO)
- Products: Multi-platform media: print, digital, radio, TV; print houses, out-of-home advertising, logistics, distribution and marketing services, online comparison platforms, Marketing and Sales Services for SME
- Revenue: €2.316 billion (2015)
- Owner: Yvonne Bauer (85%)
- Number of employees: 11,500 (2015)
- Website: www.bauermedia.com

Heinrich Bauer Publishing (German: Heinrich Bauer Verlag KG), trading as Bauer Media Group, is a German multimedia conglomerate headquartered in Hamburg. It operates worldwide and owns more than 600 magazines, over 400 digital products and 50 radio and TV stations, as well as print shops, postal, distribution and marketing services. It also operates outdoor advertising across Europe, following its takeover of Clear Channel Europe in April 2025. Bauer has a workforce of approximately 11,000 in 17 countries.

Bauer Verlagsgruppe has been managed by five generations of the Bauer family. In November 2010, Heinz Heinrich's daughter Yvonne Bauer became CEO and 85% owner of the Bauer Media Group after joining the family business in 2005.

In February 2021, Bauer Media Group announced it was to acquire Ireland's Communicorp Group, subject to regulatory approval. The acquisition was completed on 1 June 2021.

== History ==
The company was founded in 1875 by the German lithographer Johann Andreas Ludolph Bauer (1852–1941). He opened a printing shop in Hamburg at the age of 23. The focus was on the production of business cards. The company was initially taken over by his son Heinrich Friedrich Matthias (1874–1949) and later continued by his grandson Alfred (1898–1984), who joined the company in 1918 and became a partner in 1935. In 1903, the company bought the Rothenburgsorter Zeitung, a for free advertising paper, and incorporated a stationery business. A high-speed printing press and a typesetting machine were among the new working capital of the general partnership J. A. L. Bauer & Sons, also founded in 1903, which now employed around 20 people.

CEO Alfred Bauer became a member of the Nazi Party in 1939. By ingratiation of Bauer Verlag to the Nazi regime, the Bauer journals had more success. This was identified in research conducted in 2020 by the Norddeutscher Rundfunk media magazine Zapp and the news magazine Der Spiegel, which demonstrated a proximity of the content of Rundfunkkritik or Funk-Wacht (Radio Watch) to Nazi ideology. In 1942, however, Funk-Wacht was discontinued due to a lack of paper.

In 2024 the company commissioned a comprehensive study from the Historiker-Genossenschaft eG, a cooperative of historical researchers, to examine the corporate history of the Bauer Media Group during the Nazi era, and published the results.

== H Bauer UK ==
Originally a small printing house in Germany, Bauer Media Group entered the UK with the launch of Bella magazine in 1987. Under the name of H Bauer Publishing they became Britain's third largest publisher. Bauer further expanded in the UK with the purchase of Emap Consumer Media and Emap Radio in 2008.

In the UK there are two divisions of the Bauer Media Group. The original UK business trades as H Bauer Publishing. Its sister company is known as Bauer Media (Bauer Consumer Media Ltd) with CEO Paul Keenan.

=== H Bauer Publishing titles ===
Titles include women's weekly and TV listings magazines Bella, Take a Break, that's life!, TV Choice and Total TVGuide along with a number of puzzle magazines.

In 1987, Bella was H Bauer's first venture into publishing in the UK. In 1990, H Bauer launched a weekly women's magazine named Take a Break. H Bauer also has a sister title, that's life! that launched in 1995. The H Bauer Publishing brand also includes puzzle magazines that carry the Take a Break name.

==== TV listings magazines ====
In 1991, Bauer launched its first TV listings publishing with the launch of TV Quick magazine. (Prior to the de-regulation of TV listings in March 1991, BBC listings had been restricted by law to Radio Times and ITV/Channel 4 listings to TV Times.) TV Quick ceased publication in July 2010. In 1999 H Bauer launched TV Choice at a much lower price point than other titles on the market. TV Choice overtook its main competitor in the February 2008 audited ABCs and has been the number one weekly newsstand magazine in the UK since. In September 2003, H Bauer launched Total TV Guide to cover the increasing number of programmes available on Freeview and satellite or cable services.

=== Bauer Media brands ===
Bauer Media is a multi-platform media group, with locations across the UK. Following their purchase of Emap in 2007, The Bauer Media Group acquired a collection of media brands. This includes heat and Grazia as well as a radio portfolio of national radio brands such as KISS FM UK and Magic, and regional radio brands across major UK cities. In 2013, Bauer Media also acquired the Absolute Radio Group from the publishers of The Times of India.

Bauer Media also formerly broadcast TV music channels including The Box TV, in a joint venture with Channel 4. In the UK Bauer Media is the sister company of H Bauer Publishing, who publish titles including Take a Break.

==== Music publications ====
Q began as a music magazine published monthly in the United Kingdom. Originally it was to be called Cue (named after the act of cueing a record to play). However the name was changed so that it would not be mistaken for a snooker magazine. The Q music brand has expanded to Radio and Television, with Q Radio and Q TV being music entertainment that specialises in indie, rock and alternative. Q also holds annual music awards in the UK, known as Q Awards. In spring 2010, Bauer attempted to unilaterally impose a new contract on all photographers and writers, which was set to take away their copyright and off-load liability for libel or copyright infringement from the publisher onto the contributor. 200 photographers and writers from Q and Bauer's other music magazines, Kerrang! and Mojo, were reported as refusing to work under the new terms.

In 2020, Q magazine was scrapped alongside sister publication Planet Rock (joining real-life publication Simply You, Practical Photography and car magazine Modern Classics as titles closed by Bauer) as a buyer could not be found to continue the publication beyond issue Q415, with Kelsey Media deciding to buy Sea Angler, Car Mechanics and Your Horse instead.

===== Kerrang! =====
Kerrang logo

Kerrang! is a brand that specialises in rock music. It was originally a magazine with Kerrang! Radio being launched in 2004. Bauer acquired the Kerrang! brand in 2008, which also included music channel Kerrang! TV (existing as part of The Box Plus Network). As of 2005, all of Kerrang! TV's programme content is music videos, the majority of which is open scheduled for text requests from their playlist. In April 2017, the magazine was sold to Mixmag's publisher Wasted Talent with Kerrang! TV/The Box Plus Network coming under the full ownership of Channel 4 in January 2019.

==== Other publications ====
Mother and Baby is parenting website and set of awards aimed at helping parents with advice and product reviews that help them buy well.

The Debrief was an online magazine aimed at ABC1 women in their 20s launched in 2014 in competition with Mail Online and Stylist. It was closed in 2018.

Empire is a monthly film magazine. Launched in the UK in 1989, it is now also published in the US, Australia, Turkey, Russia and Portugal. Its annual Empire Awards are voted for by its readers.

Closer was launched by Bauer Media in 2002. It specialises mainly in celebrity news and gossip, real-life stories and television/entertainment.

The UK edition of Grazia was launched in 2005 as the first glossy woman's weekly magazine in the country.

Launched in 1999, heat is a British celebrity weekly. Its main focus is celebrity interviews, gossip, fashion advice and entertainment.

Yours is a fortnightly lifestyle magazine and website targeting women aged 50 and over, launched in 1974. It covers issues including health, relevant news, fashion and beauty.

Motor Cycle News (MCN) launched as a newspaper in 1955. The brand now has an online presence and is a digital business, with sub-brands including MCN compare, a motorcycle insurance comparison service and MCN classified Bikes for Sale. MCN covers news on all major motorcycle sporting events as well as bike and equipment tests.

Parker's Car Guide is a monthly magazine and, more recently, a website listing prices for new and used cars in the UK. It was founded in 1972 and is the longest-running print price guide in the UK. The website was launched in 1999 and it provides news, advice information as well as cars for sale and additional services such as insurance, to car buyers.

AM (Automotive Management), together with its online counterpart has been a source of news, insight and analysis for the UK automotive industry since 1990.

Pregnancy & Birth was a British magazine aimed at pregnant women. It was part of the Bauer Media Group. It gave out information about pregnancy, products for pregnant women, and it shares other women's stories of childbirth experiences. Between January and June 2011, Pregnancy & Birth had a circulation of 26,775 copies.

=== Bauer Media Audio ===
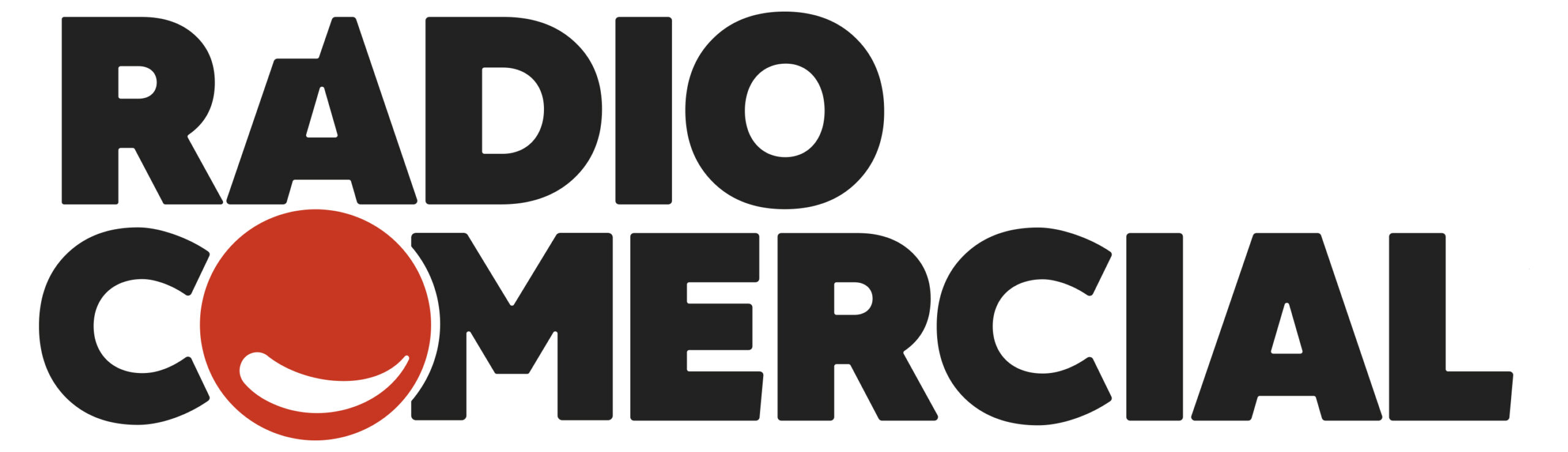
Rádio Comercial logo

Bauer Media currently has radio operations in the UK, Ireland, Poland, Portugal, Slovakia, Denmark, Sweden, Finland and Norway. It operates over 150 radio brands, including Absolute Radio, KISS, Hits Radio Network, Magic, RMF, and Mix Megapol.

In 2021, the company announced it was about to buy Mediatakojat Oy in Finland (owner of Radio Pori 89.4 and Radio City Mikkeli) and moved into the Irish market by buying Denis O'Brien's Communicorp group.

In February 2022, Media Capital Group in Portugal announced that it had come to an agreement with the Bauer Group to sell all their radio stations for around 70 million Euros, marking the entry of the Bauer Group into the Portuguese market.

=== The Box Plus Network ===
Bauer Media Group held a 50% stake in the British television company The Box Plus Network until the other owner, British broadcaster Channel Four Television Corporation, bought the whole stake in January 2019.

== Bauer Media Australia and New Zealand ==
In September 2012, Bauer Media bought ACP Magazines (formerly Australian Consolidated Press) from London-based private equity firm, CVC Capital Partners and Australian media company Nine Entertainment for an estimated A$500 million, completing the purchase the following month. This purchase included the Australian Women's Weekly, Cleo, Cosmo, Harper's Bazaar, Women's Day, and Zoo magazines. As a result, ACP Magazines was rebranded as Bauer Media. The company soon sold its computing titles APC and TechLife in 2013 to Future plc.

In March 2020, Bauer bought Pacific Magazines from Seven West Media; acquiring New Idea, Who, Diabetic Living, Men's Health, Women's Health, Better Homes & Gardens and Girlfriend.

On 2 April 2020, Bauer Media Group announced that it would wind up its New Zealand magazine titles in direct response to magazines having been stopped from being published under New Zealand's Level 4 restrictions in response to the COVID-19 pandemic in New Zealand. This led to the suspension of several titles including Woman's Day, New Zealand Woman's Weekly, the New Zealand Listener, The Australian Women's Weekly, North & South, Next, Metro, Air New Zealand's inflight magazine Kia Ora, and Your Home & Garden, leaving about 200 former employees unemployed. While Broadcasting Minister Kris Faafoi said that the Government could have provided financial relief through a wage subsidy scheme or the business finance guarantee, the company had not sought it. Many of the magazines previously owned by Bauer publish articles on the website Noted (noted.co.nz). In June 2020, Bauer Media Australia was sold to Mercury Capital. In September 2020, Bauer Media Australia was rebranded as Are Media.

=== Rebel Wilson v Bauer Media Group ===
In 2017, Bauer Media Group was successfully sued by the Australian actor Rebel Wilson for defamation in the Supreme Court of Victoria in Melbourne, Australia. This was the biggest payout for defamation of its kind in Australian legal history.

Bauer Media Group printed a series of lies and false articles against the actress in an attempt to defame her. This reportedly led to the actress being overlooked for a number of big Hollywood roles. Wilson was awarded A$4,567,472. The award consisted of $650,000 in general damages and $3,917,472 in special damages.

Wilson's lawyer Richard Leder, said "Today's verdict is a significant record — it's about four times the highest previous verdict in a defamation case in Australia".

While the guilty defamation decision stands the amount of payment was later appealed and reduced. Wilson announced in July 2018 she will be taking the matter further to a higher court in Australia.

== Bauer Media Group USA ==
Bauer Media Group entered the US market in 1981 with the launch of Woman's World magazine. Bauer Media Group USA had a portfolio of 13 magazines, five special interest publications and 16 websites across several distinct consumer segments: celebrity/entertainment, women's, teen and science/technology.

In 1989, the company introduced its second publication, First for Women, a women's magazine. Alliance for Audited Media reports that Woman's World and First for Women are the #1 and #2 selling magazines at retail, respectively.

The company's popular teen brands include Twist, launched in 1997; J-14, launched in 1999; M, launched in 2000; Girls' World; launched in 2013, and Animal Tales, launched in 2014. J-14 ranks in the top five media brands for social media presence among all publishers according to Shareablee, a social media research company.

In Touch Weekly, a celebrity/entertainment weekly magazine, was introduced in the U.S. in November 2002. It was the first launch of a new celebrity magazine in the U.S. in more than a decade and ranks in the top 10 magazines sold at retail in the country, according to the Alliance for Audited Media.

The company debuted Life & Style Weekly, a celebrity and fashion weekly, in 2004. Adding its third celebrity weekly in October 2013, Bauer Media introduced an American edition of Closer Weekly, geared towards women 40+. All three entertainment titles were awarded with Media Industry Newsletter's "Hottest Launch of the Year" award in their respective launch years. Closer Weekly tied for the title with Dr. Oz The Good Life in the 2014 ceremony.

Bauer Media US launched Bauer Xcel Media, a digital division, in August 2014.

In 2018, Bauer sold all but its women's magazines and iD to American Media, Inc. It sold its remaining American titles (Woman's World, First for Women, Soaps in Depth) in 2022 to the company now known as A360media.

== See also ==
- ARD
- Deutsche Welle
- Kabel eins
- ProSiebenSat.1 Media
- Sport1
