= Take 5 (magazine) =

Weekly Australian magazine

- Editor: Rachel Williams
- Categories: Women's magazine
- Frequency: Weekly
- Publisher: Are Media
- Founded: 1998; 28 years ago
- Company: Are Media
- Country: Australia
- Based in: Sydney
- Language: English
- Website: www.take5mag.com.au

Take 5 is a weekly magazine owned by the Australian media company Are Media. The magazine was launched in 1998 and goes on sale every Thursday. It features a variety of true stories submitted by readers, as well as recipes, fashion, tips, health news and a pull-out puzzle book, with the chance to win prizes by entering by post or online. It is aimed at a mainly female demographic, but is popular with all ages and genders. It has run campaigns on domestic violence (One Strike & You're Out), ice addiction (Break the Ice) and post natal depression (Chums For Mums). In 2016 it won both Magazine of the Year (General interest) and Editor of the Year (Paul Merrill) at the Australian Magazine Awards. It has become famous and won awards, for its outlandish cover lines. Buzzfeed has created posts featuring some of the funniest examples.

It has an average of 754,000 readers every week (EMMA survey May 2017), making it one of the best-read magazines in Australia.
