= Chat (magazine) =

British magazine

- Cover of 28 March 2024 issue
- Current Editor: Kate Williams
- Categories: Woman's magazine
- Frequency: Weekly
- Circulation: 331,102 (ABC Jul – Dec 2013); Print and digital editions.
- Founded: 1985
- Company: Future plc
- Country: United Kingdom
- Language: English
- Website: www.magazinesdirect.com/uk/chat-subscription/dp/534c1bca

Chat is a British weekly women's magazine, published through Future plc.

== History and profile ==
Chat was launched in 1985. The magazine also includes weekly features such as: Ooo...Spooky! and Ruth the Truth, Your Stars, Ahh Kids, Write to Chat, Blimey! That's clever, and On the Telly, among others. As well as including features, the magazine may include puzzles, such as sudokus, crosswords, word search or arrowords. Indeed, the magazine publishes a spin-off magazine devoted to arrowords. Paul Merrill edited the magazine, which includes mostly real life stories.

The phrase chat mags has been used to add a collective term to describe the weekly, low-priced, casual-read magazines marketed at women, in the same way that the phrase "lad's mags" is used to describe a similar category of men's magazines.

== Reception and circulation ==
From January to December 2022, the circulation of Chat was 126,399 copies.
