= Who (magazine) =

Australian entertainment magazine

WHO (November 2015 cover)

Who is a celebrity news and entertainment weekly magazine published in Australia by Are Media. It was launched in February 1992 as a sister magazine to the United States weekly People, with a name change facilitated because of an existing Australian lad's mag of the same name.

Between March 2012 and March 2013, Who had a circulation of 121,708 copies and a readership of 473,000. It is edited by Shari Nementzik, who previously edited OK! magazine.
