= Are Media =

Australian media company

- Parent company: Mercury Capital
- Predecessor: Sydney Newspapers; Australian Associated Newspapers; Australian Consolidated Press; Bauer Media Group; Pacific Magazines
- Founded: 2020 (predecessor founded in 1936)
- Founder: Frank Packer
- Country of origin: Australia
- Headquarters location: Park Street, Sydney
- Publication types: Magazines, books
- Official website: aremedia.com.au

Are Media is an Australian media company. It was formed after the 2020 purchase of the assets of Bauer Media Australia, which had in turn acquired the assets of Pacific Magazines, AP Magazines and Australian Consolidated Press (ACP) during the 2010s. It is owned by the Sydney investment firm Mercury Capital.

== History ==
=== Australian Consolidated Press ===
Consolidated Press was established in 1936, bringing together ownership of The Daily Telegraph and Frank Packer's Australian Women's Weekly. It was renamed Australian Consolidated Press (ACP) in 1957, and acquired The Bulletin in 1960.

The Daily Telegraph was sold to News Limited in 1972; the same year ACP founded Cleo and took over Publishers Holdings (including Australian House & Garden, Wheels, and others). Two years later, Frank Packer died, and his son Kerry took over the company.

In 1988, ACP acquired John Fairfax's magazines (including Woman's Day, People, Dolly, and Good Housekeeping).

In 1994, ACP merged with the Nine Network to form Publishing & Broadcasting Limited. In 2000, Australian Consolidated Press was rebranded ACP Magazines.

In 1999, PBL acquired Crown Limited, and in 2002, it combined ACP and Nine into a new division, PBL Media. CVC Capital Partners acquired PBL Media in 2007.

In 2011, ACP sold its magazines in Singapore, Malaysia and Indonesia to Singapore Press Holdings.

=== Pacific Magazines ===
Pacific Magazines was a magazine publisher operating in Australia, owned by Seven West Media. It was acquired by Bauer Media Australia in April 2020 before being included in Mercury Capital's subsequent purchase of Bauer's former Australian and New Zealand assets. In June 2020, Mercury Capital acquired Pacific Magazines as part of its purchase of Bauer's former Australian and New Zealand assets.

=== Bauer Media Australia and New Zealand ===
In September 2012, Nine Entertainment announced that it had agreed to sell ACP Magazines to the German multinational publishing company Bauer Media for an estimated A$500 million, with the sale completed on 1 October 2012. ACP was rebranded as Bauer Media Australia.

Bauer Media Australia sold its computing titles APC and TechLife in 2013 to Future plc.

The publisher had many tie-ins with other Nine Entertainment Co. companies, such as Nine Network programs (Burke's Backyard and Good Medicine) and the Magshop web service, which is now operated by Bauer Media Group.

In October 2019, Bauer agreed terms to purchase Pacific Magazines from Seven West Media. The transaction was completed in May 2020 after the Australian Competition & Consumer Commission cleared the sale.

In April 2020, several titles temporarily ceased publication because of the COVID-19 pandemic.

=== Mercury Capital ===
In June 2020, the Sydney investment firm Mercury Capital purchased Bauer Media's Australian and New Zealand print and digital assets covering women's entertainment and lifestyle; fashion, beauty and health; food; and the motoring and trader lifestyle categories. Some New Zealand brands acquired by Mercury Capital included the New Zealand Woman's Weekly, the New Zealand Listener, and North and South. Notable Australian assets acquired by the company include Woman's Day, The Australian Women's Weekly, Rolling Stone Australia, Cleo, Dolly, and Pacific Magazines.

In mid-July 2020, Mercury Capital announced that it would resume publishing several former Bauer titles including Woman's Day, the New Zealand Woman's Weekly, The Australian Women's Weekly NZ, home category magazine Your Home & Garden, current affairs weekly New Zealand Listener, Air New Zealand's in-flight magazine Kia Ora, the Property Press, and the websites Now to Love, Homes to Love and Beauty Heaven. However, Mercury Capital closed down several publications including NW and Good Health, and the Australian editions of Elle, Harper's Bazaar, InStyle, Men's Health, OK!, Women's Health. In addition, Mercury Capital sold the New Zealand titles Metro to independent publisher Simon Chesterman and North & South to independent publishers Konstantin Richter and Verena Friederike Hasel respectively.

In late September 2020, Bauer Media Australia was rebranded as Are Media. As part of the rebrand and relaunch, the company's CEO Brendon Hill confirmed that Are Media would be relaunching several titles including the New Zealand Woman's Weekly, New Zealand Listener, Woman's Day, The Australian Women's Weekly, Your Home and Garden, and Air New Zealand's inflight magazine Kia Ora.

In late June 2023, Are Media partnered with New Zealand media company NZME to launch an online version of the New Zealand Listener called "Listener.co.nz." The website is hosted on The New Zealand Herald's website and features exclusive digital content.

Are Media was put up for sale by Mercury in July 2025 and the sale process was still ongoing as of May 2026.

== Brands ==
=== Entertainment, lifestyle and health ===
- Better Homes and Gardens Australia
- Australian Diabetic Living
- New Idea
- Now to Love (digital)
- Take 5
- That's Life!
- TV Week
- The Australian Women's Weekly
- Woman's Day
- Who

=== Fashion and beauty ===
- Beautycrew (digital)
- Beautyhaven (digital)
- Elle Australia
- Girlfriend
- Marie Claire Australia
- Marie Claire Lifestyle Australia

=== Food ===
- The Australian Women's Weekly Food
- Gourmet Traveller

=== Homes ===
- Australian House and Garden
- Home Beautiful
- Country Style
- Belle

=== Parenting ===
- Bounty

=== New Zealand ===
- Kia Ora: Air New Zealand Inflight magazine
- New Zealand Listener
- The Australian Women's Weekly New Zealand Edition
- New Zealand Woman's Weekly
- New Zealand Woman's Weekly Food (digital)
- Now to Love (digital)
- Woman's Day (New Zealand edition)
- Your Home and Garden
