= The Weekly's War =

- Genre: Docudrama
- Written by: Stephen Ramsey; John Edwards
- Directed by: Stephen Ramsey
- Starring: Noni Hazlehurst; Pat Thomson; Jane Harders; Michael Caton
- Country of origin: Australia
- Original language: English
- No. of episodes: 2

Production
- Producer: Suzanne Baker
- Editor: Ray Thomas
- Camera setup: Kerrie Brown
- Running time: 2 x 75 mins

Original release
- Network: Nine Network
- Release: 21 April 1983

The Weekly's War is a 1983 biographical TV miniseries about writer Dorothy Drain and her colleagues at The Australian Women's Weekly, during World War II.

== Synopsis ==
The Weekly's War centres on real-life journalist Dorothy Drain and the senior editorial staff from The Australian Women's Weekly, who are tasked with the job of creating and reflecting the public's mood during the 1940s and World War II. Drain (Noni Hazlehurst), who later became editor, specialised in writing moving human interest stories about the effects of war on the home front, while Tilly Shelton-Smith (Jane Harders) reported on the Australian forces overseas.

== Cast ==
- Noni Hazlehurst as Dorothy Drain
- Pat Thomson as Esmé Fenston
- Jane Harders as Tilly Shelton-Smith
- Michael Caton as Les Haylen
- Ray Meagher as Frank Packer
- Jacqueline Kott as Alice Jackson / Narrator
- Bill Hunter as George
- Patricia Kennedy as Dame Mary Gilmore
- Carole Skinner as Nurse
- Peter Fisher as Davo
- Christopher Pate as Turk

== Release ==
The first episode aired on 21 April 1983.

== Production ==
The series was written by John Edwards and Stephen Ramsey, with the latter directing. Suzanne Baker served as producer. It consisted of two 75 minute episodes, which utilised archival newsreel footage, and visuals from The Australian Women’s Weekly magazine.

It was filmed on an elaborate set at Film Australia's Sydney studios. The Australian Women’s Weekly staff including Dorothy Drain (who was editor of the magazine from 1972 to 1975), served as consultants, to assist with historical accuracies. The production coincided with the magazine's golden (50 year) anniversary.

== See also ==
- List of Australian television series
