= Jean Williamson =

Australian journalist (1891 – 1977)

- Her Australian Women's Weekly's banner
- Born: Ada Jean Hounsell; 31 October 1891; Belmont, New South Wales
- Died: 14 January 1977 (aged 85); Ashfield, New South Wales
- Occupation: journalist
- Employer: The Australian Women's Weekly

Ada Jean Hounsell Williamson better known as Jean Williamson (31 October 1891 – 14 January 1977) was an Australian journalist. When The Australian Women's Weekly was becoming a best selling magazine known for its light fiction, she was in charge of the light fiction.

== Life ==
Williamson was born in 1891 in Belmont, New South Wales. Her parents were Ada Mary Theobald (born Hannell) and John Alexander Williamson. She was the first of their five children. After a private education she began contributing articles as a freelance to newspapers and the Australian Town and Country Journal. She obtained her first job running the women's part of the Farmer and Settler newspaper in 1916.

She worked at the Sydney Morning Herald where Florence Baverstock was the social editor and one of Australia's first women staff journalists who ran the newspaper's women's section from 1914. At one point Williamson was sacked because of her absenteeism. She wrote a letter apologising for her unreliability and noting that she had recently lost her fiancée. The letter was accepted, and when Florence Baverstock retired from the women's section in 1918, then Williamson was her successor.

The Australian Women's Weekly was started in 1933 by Frank Packer and Ted Theodore with George Warnecke as the first editor. The newspaper's features were designed to be topical, Australian and to appeal to all Australian women. Warnecke hoped The Weekly would be a sign that Australia finally was coming out of the Depression. Williamson was hired in June 1933 (moving from the Sydney Morning Herald) where she was surprised to find that she was the editor for "fiction" and her column was called "New Books". Soon letters were arriving from women who were obviously lonely and they were enjoying light fiction. Warnecke went abroad in 1934 and Alice Jackson became the de facto editor.

By 1936 Williamson was one the best known women journalists and when The Daily Telegraph in Sydney was relaunched they appointed "Ten Brilliant Editors" and Williamson was one of them. She was chosen because of her understanding of what women wanted and because she understood newspapers. She worked on the Telegraph, but then returned to "The Weekly" where she continued her successful formula. The Weekly became a leading publisher of light fiction. Australian authors included Margot Neville, Mary Gilmore, Lennie Lower and Henrietta Drake-Brockman.

She was a member of the Institute of Journalists and in 1953 she was the honorary secretary.

Williamson died in 1977 in the Sydney suburb of Ashfield.
