= Gerald Carr (cartoonist) =

Australian cartoonist

- Born: 1944 (age 81–82); Bendigo, Victoria, Australia
- Occupations: Cartoonist, illustrator, graphic designer
- Website: www.vixenmagazine.com

Gerald Carr is an Australian comic book writer, artist and illustrator, best known for his creations, Vampire! and Vixen.

== Biography ==
Gerald Carr, born in Bendigo, Victoria in 1944 and studied art at the Bendigo Institute of Technology. He later moved to Sydney, where he entered into the comic book industry, working for Walter Grainger Publications, which were the Australian distributors of the Disney line of comics, as a letterist (the imported comics were using Italian artwork but required English text).

In 1967 Carr returned to Melbourne, where he was employed by an advertising agency and a printing company. He had his first comic strip, Brigette, published in Go-Set magazine, between October 1968 and May 1969. Brigette was a contemporary Australian heroine, who was coming of age, in a time of changing social and sexual attitudes. Carr's agent, Sol Shifrin, sold Brigette as a newspaper strip to Perth's Sunday Independent and Brisbane's Sunday Mail, commencing in both papers on 5 July 1969. The strip's frank discussion of sexual freedoms and the occasional drug reference ran afoul of both readers and editors' conservative tastes, which led to both papers dropping Brigette by August – September 1969.

The strip reappeared in the Melbourne Newsday paper in October 1969, running for five months before it was dropped as a cost-cutting measure. In 2002, the Italian comics' publisher, Fumetto, published some Brigette strips in a collection titled Eroine Di China, or Heroines of the Newspaper Strip.

During this period, Carr also created the satirical science fiction strip Fabula for Broadside, a left-leaning literary magazine published by the owners of the Melbourne Age newspaper. Similar in style to the sexy French science fiction strip Barbarella, Fabula was a thinly veiled commentary on contemporary Australian politics set in a futuristic world.

Carr's first self publication was a comic fanzine, a one-shot title, Wart's Epic, which was issued in 1970, containing a mix of adult science fiction, violence, nudity and psychedelic artwork. Wart's Epic was distributed in Melbourne and by mail order to the US, and predates comparable 'adult' comics such as Star*Reach and Heavy Metal. In 1971 he started drawing Devil Done, a James Bond-styled action strip, for the K. G. Murray Publishing Company.

In the absence of locally produced comics Carr became interested in producing his own, as there was a shortage of comic artists, he undertook all the writing and illustrating himself. His first attempt in 1974, at self-printing was modest, with the comic only being distributed in Victoria. In 1975 Carr added more material and had his comic, Vampire!, professionally printed for distribution around Australia. Vampire! which ran for six issues between 1975 and 1979, was a black and white horror comic which capitalised on the popularity of similar American adult horror titles, such as Creepy, Eerie and Vampirella.

In 1980 Carr was producing Brigette for the Sun-Herald and also published three one-shot comic books, Brain Master and Vixen, Fire-Fang, about a Chinese vampire exiled to Australia's gold fields in the 1800s, and Shock Raider, a post-apocalyptic science fiction story that was published in full colour. Carr also worked on advertising and book illustrations. In 1992 Carr published Vixen, a superheroine he initially had created for Wart's Epic, which was distributed nationally and also in America and in the same year Carr won the 'Cartoon of the Year' Award at the Australian Rotary National Cartoon Awards held in Coffs Harbour.

Carr created the comic strip, The Dirty Digger, a World War II adventure series featuring an Australian commando in the Z Special Unit, Major Lex Mainwaring. The Dirty Digger was originally published in 1994 in Australian War Stories (Southern Aurora) but was subsequently issued as a one-shot comic in 1996. In 1995 Carr re-entered the comic book market, launching several new titles under his Meteor Comics imprint. This included a short-lived second series of Vampire!, which only ran for two issues, which reprinted the original Fire Fang stores from the 1970s, together with the reintroduction of the superheroine Vixen (two issues), a creation from Carr's Wart's Epic. Vixen originally worked in partnership with the enigmatic Brainmaster, as they fought vampires, aliens, spies and other menaces through a succession of comics, including Vampire!. With the new Vixen comic, Carr shifted his heroine to the fictional American location of Pacific City. Vixen was also significant for featuring new stories by Carr starring Captain Atom (renamed 'Atomic Warrior') and The Panther, two Australian comic book heroes from the 1950s, which Carr produced under licence from their respective creators, Arthur Mather and Paul Wheelahan. Vixen nearly spelt the end of Meteor Comics, when Australian Consolidated Press launched legal proceedings against Carr to acquire the rights to the 'Vixen' trademark. Carr eventually defeated the legal action, but only at considerable financial cost to himself.

Whilst Carr has not released any new comic titles since 1995, he continues to publish comic art in a variety of formats, including downloadable 'eBooks', and markets a range of merchandise featuring his comic book characters.

In 2016 the Australian Cartoonists' Association gave him The Jim Russell Award for significant contribution to Australian Cartooning and in 2019 he was awarded the Ledger of Honour at the Ledger Awards
