= George Warnecke =

Australian journalist

- Warnecke c. 1935
- Born: Glen William Warnecke; 30 July 1894; Armidale, Australia
- Died: 2 June 1981 (aged 86); Dublin, Ireland
- Occupations: Journalist; editor; publisher

Glen William "George" Warnecke (30 July 1894 – 2 June 1981) was an Australian journalist, editor, and publisher. He was born in Armidale, New South Wales and began his journalism career in 1913 as a junior reporter for The Evening News. He went on to become the founding editor of The Australian Women's Weekly, the Editor-in-chief of Australian Consolidated Press, and a co-founder of Atlas Publications. In his later years Warnecke settled in Dublin with his Irish-born wife Nora Hill who had had an active career as a concert and opera singer. He died in Dublin at the age of 86 and was buried there next to his wife. His papers and correspondence are held in the State Library of New South Wales.

== Life and career ==
=== Early years ===
Warnecke was born to Joseph Warnecke, a blacksmith of German descent, and Emily Jane née Mapletoft in Armidale, New South Wales. His family had strong Labor Party sympathies which Warnecke would share throughout his life. The Warnecke family moved to Sydney in 1912 and the following year he joined the Australian Journalists' Association, working as a junior reporter for The Evening News and its offshoot publication, Woman's Budget. It was there that he became known as "George" when printers misread his scribbled initials on copy sheets as "Geo."

In 1915 Warnecke enlisted in the Australian Imperial Force and served on the Western Front with the 19th Battalion. He had a weak left eye but had passed the medical examination by memorising the sight-testing card. He was wounded twice in 1916 and also diagnosed with shell shock. While convalescing at the AIF hospital in England near the hamlet of Hurdcott, he launched and edited a small review entitled The Hurdcott Herald. On returning to Australia in 1918 he was discharged from the army as medically unfit. Warnecke had kept an extensive diary of his war time experience, described in the Sydney Morning Herald as "the story of a young, idealistic patriot transformed by the horrors of World War I into a man old before his time." His diary entry on his 20th birthday in July 1916 read:

Red and green flares burst like a fountain of joyful fireworks from the German lines. Other flares, white ones, rose and fell in endless succession. Machine-guns rattled from a score of points and the crackling of bombs could be heard. The wounded began to limp back. A man with only half of his face. Another with broken hands ... We hardly dare ask how the stunt had gone ... It was a failure all right.

=== Sydney and Fleet Street ===
After his discharge from the army, Warnecke resumed his work at The Evening News and became active in the Australian Workers' Union. He went on to become chief-of-staff the newly launched Daily Mail which at the time was aligned with the Labor Party. In 1923 he went to England to open the London office of the Sydney-based Smith's Weekly and its newly launched daily, the Daily Guardian. Despite being well paid, Warnecke found the closed atmosphere on Fleet Street frustrating. However, he found intellectual rewards in London's Bloomsbury quarter where he mixed with Australian writers such as Anna Wickham and Christina Stead and the British communists William Gallacher and Shapurji Saklatvala. He later wrote in his memoirs "my eyes were opening, and my ears were listening." Warnecke became an ardent Irish nationalist, serving as secretary of the London branch of the Irish Workers' League and marching with them in the 1924 May Day procession. In London he also met and fell in love with the Irish soprano, Nora Hill. The couple returned to Australia later in 1924 and were married there on 18 October.

Warnecke served as chief sub-editor of the Daily Guardian from 1926 and became a protégé of its proprietor R. C. Packer. He was appointed editor of Packer's new Sunday Guardian in 1929 and later became the Editor-in-Chief of Frank Packer's Australian Consolidated Press, responsible for the relaunch of The Daily Telegraph. However, his most enduring achievement during the inter-war years was the founding of The Australian Women's Weekly. Warnecke wrote of his plans:

Give it an unswerving Australian outlook [...] Above all, whether the journalists are writing about fashion, cookery, baby care or diet there has to be a[n] element of news in what they write.

The Australian Women's Weekly launched in May 1933 with Warnecke as its editor and one of its regular contributors, along with several other prominent journalists and writers.His vision for the magazine as a mass-market, but thought-provoking publication with high production values, made it highly successful. He had to go abroad from 1934 and did not return until 1935. Alice Mabel Jackson became the de facto editor of "the weekly" even though Warnecke was still the nominal editor. Jackson became the editor in April 1939. By 1939, the magazine's circulation had reached 400,000 copies a week and for its first 50 years it remained the highest selling per capita magazine in the world.

=== American sojourn and post-war Australia ===
Warnecke's relations with Frank Packer became increasingly strained after 1935 and in April 1939 he resigned from Consolidated Press. He and Nora went to the United States. There he studied printing and magazine methods for The Herald and Weekly Times company owned by Keith Murdoch and wrote regular articles for the Melbourne Herald on US foreign policy and other topics. In 1940 he became a foreign correspondent for the McClure Newspaper Syndicate and in 1943 joined the US Office of War Information as a special writer. Many of his articles from that period were syndicated in Australian newspapers.

Warnecke and Nora returned to Australia in 1947 and remained there for the next ten years. He wrote for several newspapers, but no longer worked as an editor. He served as a consultant to Murdoch and tried his hand at publishing which he described to friends as the "Intelligent Young Man’s Guide to Capitalism". In 1947 he co-founded Atlas Publications with his fellow journalists Jack Bellew and Clive Turnbull. Atlas published magazines and popular fiction, but was best known for its comic books. The fledgling company achieved a major success in 1948 with its Captain Atom series. Captain Atom was one of the few original Australian comic heroes to have his own merchandising and fan club. At its peak the comic was selling 180,000 copies a month and ran for six years. However Atlas declined in parallel with the decline of the Australian comics industry in the second half of the 1950s. The company ceased publication in 1958. Jack Bellew had died in 1957. That same year Warnecke and Nora moved to Ireland fulfilling a long-standing promise he had made to her.

=== Final years in Ireland ===
The Warnecke's settled in Dublin where George became the "resident patriarch" of the Irish-Australian Society. His last years were increasingly marked by deafness and illness, but he continued writing up until his death. When he died in Dublin's Meath Hospital at the age of 86, he left three books unfinished, his memoirs entitled Miracle Magazine, a work on "Australianism, as identified by press, politics and religion", and a biography of John Macarthur for which he had received a grant from the Literature Board of the Australia Council. He was buried in Dublin next to Nora who had died in 1969. They had no children. Nora's Australian-born niece Meg Sordello, who had inherited Warnecke's papers and correspondence, donated them to the State Library of New South Wales where they have been held since 2003. Warnecke's World War I diaries are held in the Australian War Memorial.
