= Jack Bellew =

Australian journalist and publisher

- Born: Jack Weldon Bellew; 1901
- Died: 1957 (aged 55–56)
- Occupations: Journalist, publisher

Jack Weldon Bellew (1901 – 1957) was an Australian journalist and publisher. He was a former chief of staff of The Daily Telegraph and the Sydney Daily News and one of the three founders of Atlas Publications.

== Life and career ==
Bellew was educated at Scotch College and the University of Melbourne before beginning his career in journalism. Amongst the papers he wrote for were The Argus, the Melbourne Herald, the Daily Telegraph, and the Sydney Daily News, (Note: The Sydney Daily News was the official organ of the Australian labour movement. It was published from 1922 until 1940 when it was incorporated into The Daily Telegraph by its owners Australian Consolidated Press) rising to senior editorial positions in the latter two. After leaving the Daily Telegraph, Bellew, George Warnecke, and Clive Turnbull founded Atlas Publications in 1947. The company was managed by Peter Ryan, who characterised the founders as "a small syndicate of well-off Melbourne lefty journalists". Atlas published magazines and popular fiction but was best known for its adventure comics. Their first major success and one of the earliest home-grown Australian comic heroes was Captain Atom drawn by Arthur Mather. Bellew created the character and wrote the first 20 issues under the pseudonym "John Welle".

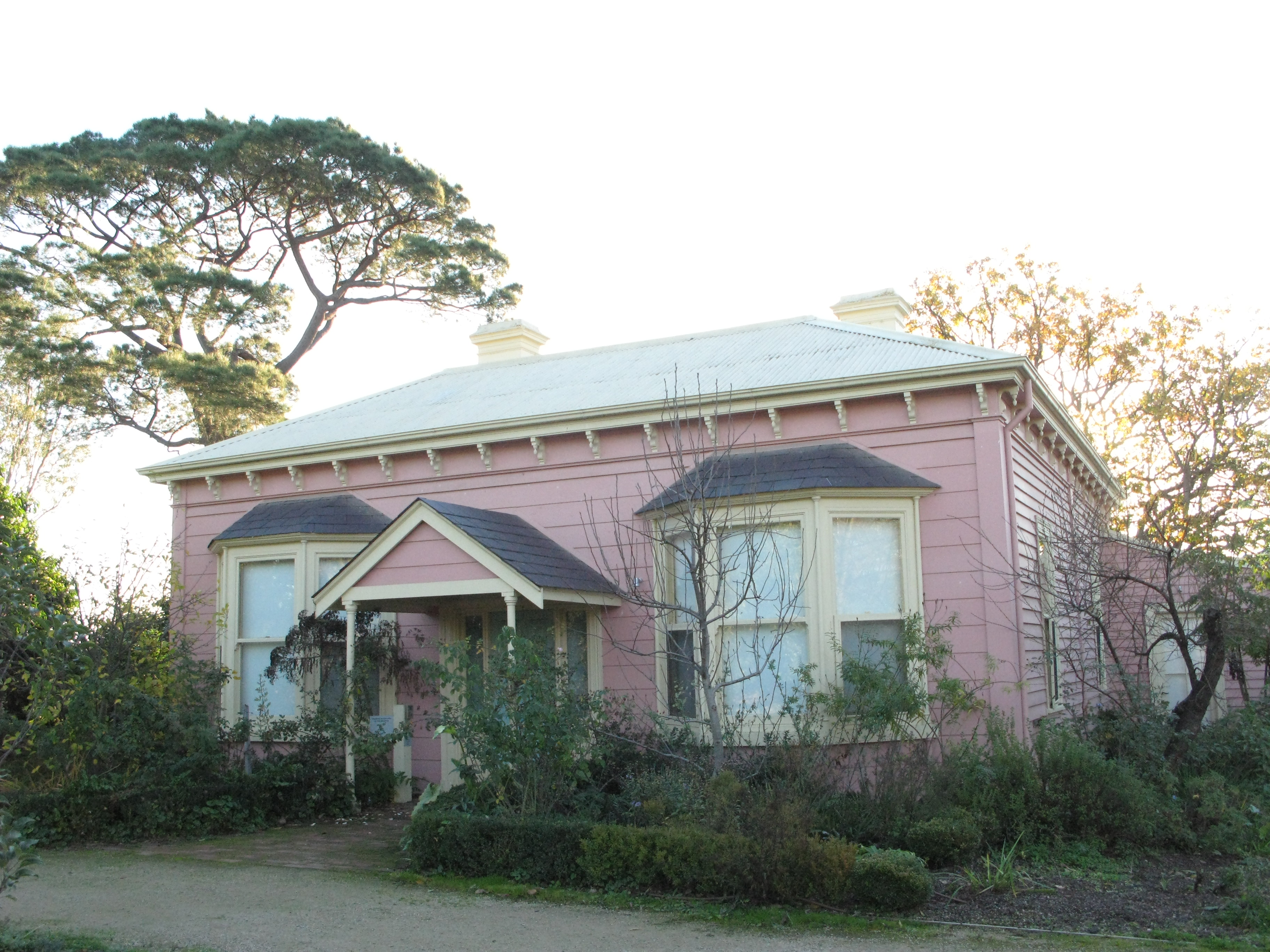
John and Sunday Reed's house "Heide" where Bellew and his wife lived from 1948 to 1949

Bellew and his wife Molly were close friends of John and Sunday Reed and became part of the Heide Circle. They lived at Reed's house "Heide" and took care of the property while the Reeds were in France in 1948–49. Bellew also became the editor of Tomorrow, which had been founded by John Reed and Max Harris in 1945. Tomorrow was a sensationalist tabloid focused on attacking capitalist conglomerates and the opponents of British socialism. Amongst its frequent targets were the Australian Liberal Party and Robert Menzies, whom Bellew always attacked in rhyme. According to the artist Sidney Nolan, another member of the Heide Circle, Bellew was responsible for one the paintings in his Ned Kelly series becoming two separate ones—Burning at Glenrowan and Siege at Glenrowan.

These were once joined [...] but late one night Jack Bellew, a journalist, said, "Look, Sid, that painting is too bloody big, cut it in two." I told him to leave it alone, but to prove it was not too big, I would cut it in two. You see, I come from a long line of Irishmen. So I cut it and looked at them separated and together, and they looked better together. Unfortunately I parted them forever.

Bellew died in 1957 after a short illness. He was survived by his wife Molly and their son and daughter. His younger brother Peter was an art critic and also involved in the convoluted relationships of the Heide Circle. Peter Bellew had been the lover of both John Reed's sister (and Sidney Nolan's future wife) Cynthia and of Reed's wife Sunday before marrying the ballet dancer Hélène Kirsova in 1948.
