= Dorothy Drain =

Australian journalist (1909–1996)

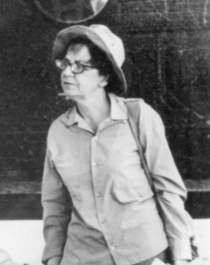
- War correspondent in Vietnam, 1965
- Born: Dorothy Simpson Drain; 16 August 1909; Mount Morgan, Queensland, Australia
- Died: 31 May 1996 (aged 86)
- Occupations: Journalist, editor, poet

Dorothy Drain (16 August 1909 – 31 May 1996) was an Australian journalist, columnist, war correspondent, editor and poet. She worked as a journalist with The Australian Women's Weekly for 38 years, with the final five years being as its editor. She was "one of Australia's best-known journalists".

== Early life and education ==
Drain was born Dorothy Simpson (Dot) Drain in Mount Morgan, Queensland on 16 August 1909. Her father, D. S. A. (David) Drain, was a headmaster of Scottish descent and her mother, Janet (sometimes referred to as Jean), was of Irish descent. Her father had been a contributor for The Bulletin during the First World War.

From the age of 2 until 12 she lived in Gracemere, near Rockhampton. In 1916 she enrolled in the Children's Corner in Rockhampton's Morning Bulletin. In 1919 she won a prize from the Central Queensland Native Birds' Protection Association for the best essay on birdlife and in the same period won other essay contests organised by the Rockhampton Agricultural Society and the Children's Corner of The Morning Bulletin and The Capricornian. In 1922 when she was just thirteen she was one of the winners of scholarships from the Department of Public Instruction with an "exceedingly creditable pass".

From 1924 to 1926 she attended the Presbyterian Girls College, a private boarding school in Toowoomba, Queensland. She won the 1926 Brunton Stephens essay, commenting at the time: "printer's ink, inherited from [my] father, has an irresistible attraction" and that she intended to "follow up the call of journalism".

== Brisbane, then Sydney ==
Drain passed a Public Service examination and in 1927 accepted a position at the State Insurance Office in Brisbane. During her leisure time she continued writing letters to newspapers, including one published in the Sydney Mail addressed to Cinderella which included references to Masefield, Shakespeare and Dickens. She also had some of her short stories published.

Drain obtained her first jobs as a journalist, with The Telegraph and then with The Courier-Mail in Brisbane. She moved to Sydney in 1936 and joined the Sydney Sun as a journalist.

She began writing poetry, most of it with a humorous twist, which was published regularly in the satirical periodical Smith's Weekly.

== The Australian Women's Weekly ==
In 1938 Drain joined The Australian Women's Weekly. She would become that magazine's news editor in 1958, the assistant editor in 1970 and finally the editor in 1972 (succeeding Esmé Fenston in that role), a position she occupied until she retired in 1975. She was also appointed as one of the Board of Directors of the Australian Consolidated Press, which owned and published the Weekly.

In 1946 she went to Japan for three months and, attached to the Australian forces, reported on the Allied occupation of Japan at the end of Second World War. She was the "first woman correspondent to visit the British Commonwealth Occupation Force". In 1950 she filed reports from Singapore and Malaya during the Emergency period and South Korea during the Korean War. In 1965 she reported from Vietnam together with the Weekly photographer Ron Berg. She was "the first female Australian journalist to visit the troops in Vietnam".

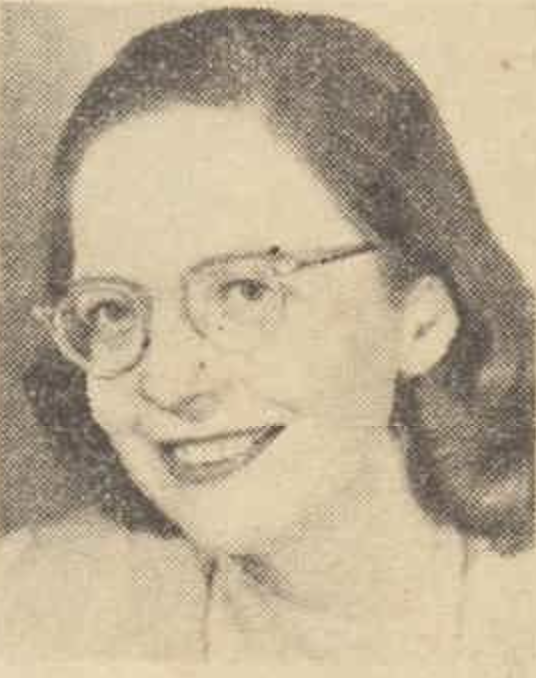
Dorothy Drain, "It Seems To Me..." columnist, 1947

For more than fifteen years (from 1947 until 1963) Drain penned a "popular" column of opinion and verse in the Weekly under the title "It Seems to Me...". The column drew "a large volume of fan mail, much of it from men".

She continued to write "brilliant" light verse which was published regularly in the Weekly, verse that was "witty, pointed but always human, satirical without being malicious" and through which much of her character revealed itself.

A memorable career moment occurred in 1955 when she secured an interview with Frank Sinatra who was flying out to Australia for a tour. To do that she flew to Suva, joined Sinatra's flight and unexpectedly sat beside him on the plane.

== Personal life ==
In 1936 when she was a young journalist Drain was living at 4 Tusculum Street, Kings Cross, in the inner eastern suburbs of Sydney. She would later write: "The reputation of The Cross was bohemian, even slightly wicked, just the sort of place to attract young people coming to the big city. In those days young people could afford to live there. You'd get a bedsitter for 25 shillings a week."

She died of a heart attack on 31 May 1996. She had suffered from emphysema for many years. She had never married.

== Commemoration ==
In 1983 a TV mini series, The Weekly's War, depicting Drain's work as a war correspondent during the Second World War was broadcast by the Nine Network.

In November 2023 it was announced that Drain was one of eight women chosen to be commemorated in the second round of blue plaques sponsored by the Government of New South Wales alongside Kathleen Butler, godmother of Sydney Harbour Bridge; Emma Jane Callaghan, an Aboriginal midwife and activist; Susan Katherina Schardt; writer Charmian Clift; Pearl Mary Gibbs an Aboriginal rights movement activist; Beryl Mary McLaughlin, one of the first three women to graduate in architecture from the University of Sydney; and Grace Emily Munro.
