= Stan Pitt =

Australian cartoonist & commercial artist (1925-2002)

Stanley Pitt
- Born: Stanley John Joseph Pitt; 2 March 1925; Rozelle, New South Wales, Australia
- Died: 2 April 2002 (aged 77); New South Wales, Australia
- Occupations: Cartoonist, Illustrator
- Writing career
- Pen name: Stan Pitt; Safone Jais
- Period: 1942–c.1986
- Genres: Adventure, crime, science fiction, pulp fiction

Stanley John Joseph Pitt (2 March 1925 – 2 April 2002) was an Australian cartoonist and commercial artist. Pitt was the first Australian comic artist to have original work published by a major American comic book company. He often collaborated with his brother, Reginald Pitt.

== Biography ==
Stanley Pitt was born in Rozelle, New South Wales (an inner western suburb of Sydney), on 2 March 1925, the son of plasterer George William Pitt and his wife Ethel. Pitt enjoyed drawing as a schoolboy and got into trouble for spending more time drawing than on his schoolwork. In 1942, whilst working as a milkman he had his first professional work, Anthony Fury, published by Australian Consolidated Press. Pitt was heavily influenced by the classic style of Alex Raymond's artwork the creator of Flash Gordon, particularly his method of switching from a pen to a brush. The following year he began illustrating comics, written by Frank Ashley, for Frank Johnson Publications. These included Larry Flynn, Detective. Pitt had no art training and no opportunity to associate with other Johnson artists, like Unk White, Carl Lyon and Jim Russell.

In 1945, he produced comic strip advertisements for Colgate Palmolive, which led to Associated Newspapers placing him under contract to develop a new science fiction strip, Silver Starr (or Silver Starr in the Flameworld). Silver Starr debuted in the Sydney newspapers The Guardian and Sunday Sun on 24 November 1946. The strips ran until November 1948, where following a dispute regarding the print size of the strip Pitt left the paper. Silver Starr was a Flash Gordon-style comic strip centred on an Australian soldier, Silver, who on his return from the Second World War, joins an expedition, with his companions, Dr. Onro and Dyson, to the Earth's interior aboard a rocket-style ship. Together, they discover the incredible "Flame World" and its ruler, Queen Pristine (Pitt's compliment to Raymond's Dale Arden), rescuing her from the evil despot, Tarka (another acknowledgement to Raymond's character Ming the Merciless). John Ryan, in his Australian comic anthology Panel by Panel, describes the strip as having story lines of average standard for this type of comic with the real attraction being the artwork.

Under Pitt's deft handling, the scenes of rock formations and underground caverns came to life; as did the seas of molten lava and the ship winding its way through rock and water.

— John Ryan

In 1948, Pitt produced Jim Atlas and Dr Peril of Igogo as back-up stories for the early issues of Captain Atom, a superhero comic by Arthur Mather published by Atlas Publications.

Pitt was then employed by John Fairfax and Sons for their new paper, The Sun-Herald, where he produced a new science fiction comic strip, Captain Power, with the storyline provided by journalist Gerry Brown, the first issue appearing on 6 March 1949. Captain Power relied heavily on super-hero style costumes and gadgets for its impact. He continued to illustrate the strip until June 1950, when the pressure of other work saw him pass the strip onto Peter James. At the time Pitt commenced illustrating Yarmak-Jungle King comics, for Young's Merchandising, in November 1949, which he continued until June 1952. Yarmak was a Tarzan imitation, with the comic illustrated by Pitt and inked at various stages by Frank and Jimmy Ashley and Paul Wheelahan, with the stories written by Frank Ashley or Pitt's younger brother, Reginald. The quality of the comic varied from issue to issue given the number of people involved in its production. Together with his brother, Reginald, he attempted to get two strips, Lemmy Caution and Mr Midnight, syndicated in the United States, when this failed he joined Cleveland Press in 1956, where he created a new series of Silver Starr. During his time at Cleveland Press, Pitt produced over 3,000 pulp fiction covers.

The two brothers then commenced work on a new comic, Gully Foyle. This was conceived by Reginald, based on Alfred Bester's science fiction novel The Stars My Destination.

The book made an indelible impression on me for so many years, even though it would be 10 years before we finally got the chance to do it.

— Reginald Pitt

According to writer Kevin Patrick, Stan and Reginald's process involved producing black and white bromide photo prints that Stan then coloured by hand; these were then forwarded to Bester in the United States for approval. According to Patrick, the brothers completed several months of the comic strip for potential syndication but then faced a legal objection from the producers of a proposed film version of The Stars My Destination, who held exclusive adaptation rights to the book. Unable to sell the strip, the brothers stopped work on the project, with only a few pieces of their artwork eventually making it into the public domain, through a number of fanzines.

As a result of his artwork on the unpublished Gully Foyle, Pitt was approached by two US publishers to handle comic book work for them. Pitt then became the first Australian artist to have original material published in an American comic book, with the publication of The Witching Hour No. 14 (National Periodical Publications, Inc) and Boris Karloff – Tales of Mystery No. 33 (Western Publishing).

In 1969, the US cartoonist, Al Williamson, arranged for Pitt to ghost an eleven-week sequence of his daily strip, Secret Agent Corrigan, which was followed by a further four weeks in 1972. Pitt also provided poster illustrations for his childhood hero, Flash Gordon.

In 2001, a limited edition of Gully Foyle was finally published and released. Pitt died on 2 April 2002, at the age of 77.

In 2019, Stan and Reg Pitt were awarded the Ledger of Honour at the annual Ledger Awards

== Bibliography ==
- Pitt, S. J. (Stanley John); Ashley, Frank (1942). Anthony Fury. Consolidated Press.
- Ashley, Frank; Pitt, S. J. (Stanley John) (1946). Silver Starr. Apache Comics ; Melbourne : Distributors: Gordon & Gotch (A/asia).
- Pitt, S. J. (Stanley John) (1949). Captain Power. Ayers and James Pty. Ltd.
- Ashley, Frank; Pitt, Reginald; Pitt, S. J. (Stanley John) (1949). Yarmak : Jungle King. Young's Merchandising Co : Sydney, NSW.
