= Fort Denison =

Old fort in the Sydney Harbour National Park

- Mattewanye (Dharuk)
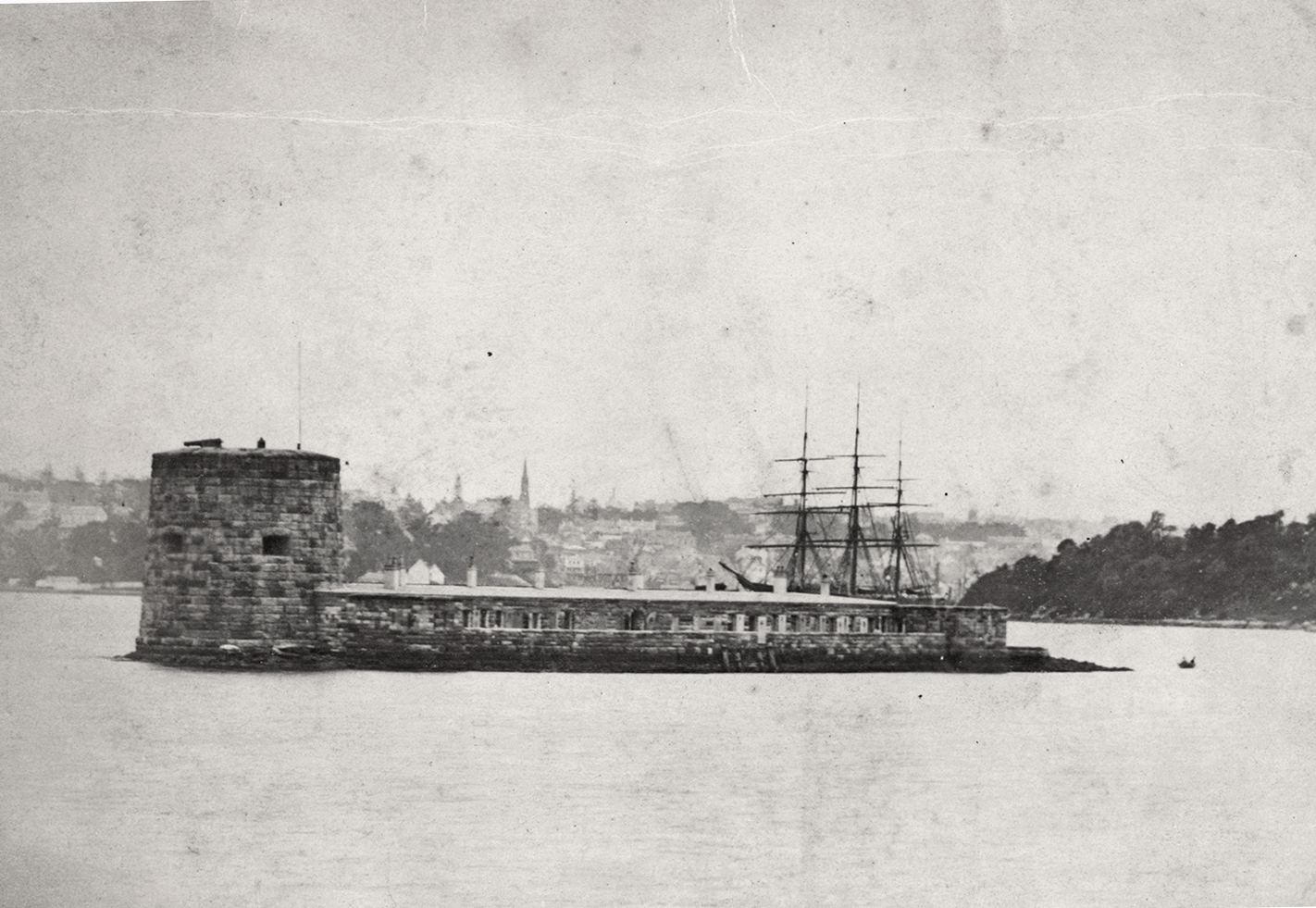
- Fort Denison pre-1885.
- Interactive map of the Fort Denison area
- Former names: Pinchgut
- Etymology: Sir William Thomas Denison

General information
- Status: Built as a fortress. Decommissioned circa 1930s. Now used as a national park; reserve; tourist facility; function space
- Type: Military fortress; gunnery
- Architectural style: Colonial fortification, castellated style
- Location: Sydney Harbour, North of Woolloomooloo
- Construction started: 1841
- Completed: 14 November 1857
- Closed: circa 1930s

Height
- Observatory: Martello tower

Technical details
- Material: Sydney sandstone
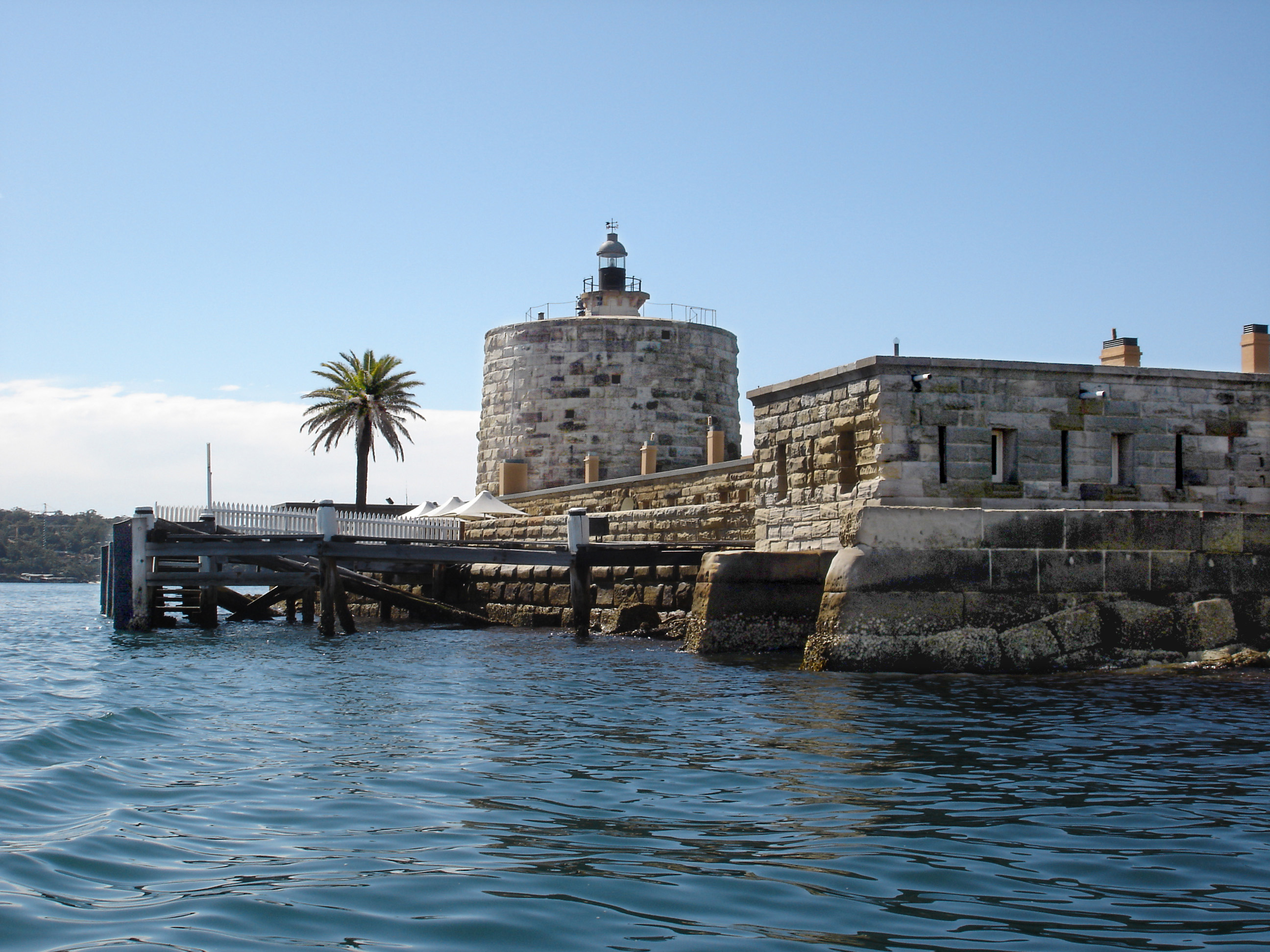
- Fort Denison with its Martello tower

- Location within inner Sydney
- Location: Port Jackson, Sydney Harbour National Park
- Nearest city: Sydney
- Coordinates: 33°51′18″S 151°13′32″E
- Operator: NSW National Parks & Wildlife Service
- Owner: Government of New South Wales
- Website: fortdenison.com.au/national-parks.html

New South Wales Heritage Register
- Official name: Fort Denison; Pinchgut; Mattewanye (Eora name)
- Type: State heritage (built)
- Designated: 2 April 1999
- Reference no.: 985
- Type: Fortification
- Category: Defence
- Builders: William Randle

Register of the National Estate
- Official name: Fort Denison, Sydney, NSW, Australia
- Designated: 21 March 1978
- Reference no.: 1856

Fort Denison, part of the Sydney Harbour National Park, is a heritage-listed former penal site and defensive facility occupying a small island located north-east of the Royal Botanic Garden and approximately 1 kilometre (0.62 mi) east of the Opera House in Sydney Harbour, New South Wales, Australia. The island may have been known as Mattewanye or Muddawahnyuh in the Eora language, and as Pinchgut Island.

The site contains time gun, navigational aids and tide gauge facilities. Correctional and military facilities were designed by George Barney and built from 1840 to 1862 by William Randle. The property is owned by the Office of Environment & Heritage. It was added to the New South Wales State Heritage Register on 2 April 1999. In 1978 the former fortress was listed on the (now defunct) Register of the National Estate, and is currently used as a national park, nature reserve, tourist facility, and as a function space.

== History ==
=== Prison ===
Pinchgut
- Interactive map of Pinchgut
- Location: Sydney Harbour, New South Wales, Australia
- Status: Closed
- Security class: Maximum; isolation
- Opened: 1788
- Former name: Rock Island
- Managed by: New South Wales Colonial Government

After the First Fleet arrived in 1788, Governor Phillip and his advocate-general used the name "Rock Island". In 1788, a convict named Thomas Hill was sentenced to a week on bread and water in irons there. The island came to be known as "Pinchgut". Once a 15-metre (49 ft) high or higher sandstone islet, the rock was levelled by convicts under the command of Captain George Barney, the civil engineer for the colony, who quarried it for sandstone to construct nearby Circular Quay.

In late 1796 the Governor had installed a gibbet on Pinchgut. A convict to be hanged and then gibbeted there was Francis Morgan. In 1793, the British transported him to New South Wales for life as punishment for a murder. The authorities in NSW executed Morgan for bashing Simon Raven to death in Sydney on 18 October 1796. On 30 November 1796, Morgan was hanged; following his execution, his body was hung in chains (gibbeting) on Pinchgut. His skeleton was still hanging there four years after his execution. He said to the hangman that the only thing worth mentioning was the superb view of the harbour from his high elevation, and that he was sure there were no waters the world over to compare with it for beauty.

=== Military fortress ===
In 1839, two American warships entered the harbour at night and circled Pinchgut Island. Concern with the threat of foreign attack caused the government to review the harbour's inner defences. Barney, who had earlier reported that Sydney's defences were inadequate, recommended that the government establish a fort on Pinchgut Island to help protect Sydney Harbour from attack by foreign vessels. Fortification of the island began in 1841 but was not completed. Construction resumed in 1855 because of fear of a Russian naval attack during the Crimean War, and was completed on 14 November 1857. The newly built fort then took its current name from Sir William Thomas Denison, the Governor of New South Wales from 1855 to 1861.

The fortress features a distinctive Martello tower, the only one ever built in Australia and the last one ever constructed in the British Empire. It was constructed using 8,000 tonnes (7,900 long tons) of sandstone from nearby Kurraba Point, Neutral Bay. The tower's walls are between 3.3–6.7 metres (11–22 ft) thick at the base and 2.7 metres (8 ft 10 in) thick at the top. However, developments in artillery rendered the fort largely obsolete by the time it was completed. The tower itself had quarters for a garrison of 24 soldiers and one officer. Fort Denison's armament included three 8-inch (200 mm) muzzle loaders in the tower, two 10-inch (250 mm) guns, one on a 360-degree traverse on the top of the tower and one in a bastion at the other end of the island, and twelve 32-pound (15 kg) cannons in a battery between the base of the tower and the flanking bastion.

Eventually all the guns were removed, except for the three 8-inch (200 mm) muzzle-loading cannons in the gun room in the tower, which were installed before construction was complete. The passages within the tower are too narrow to permit these to be removed. However, from the beginning the three cannons were of limited utility. The embrasures for the cannons were too small to use the guns effectively and by the time a cannon was loaded the ship it was to fire on would have sailed past. Lastly, the guns' recoil was too powerful for the small room.

In 1906, a saluting gun (pictured below) was transferred from Dawes Point to Fort Denison.

In 1913 a lighthouse beacon built in Birmingham, England, and shipped to Sydney, replaced the 10-inch (250 mm) gun on the roof of the tower. The light is called Fort Denison Light, which is still in use.

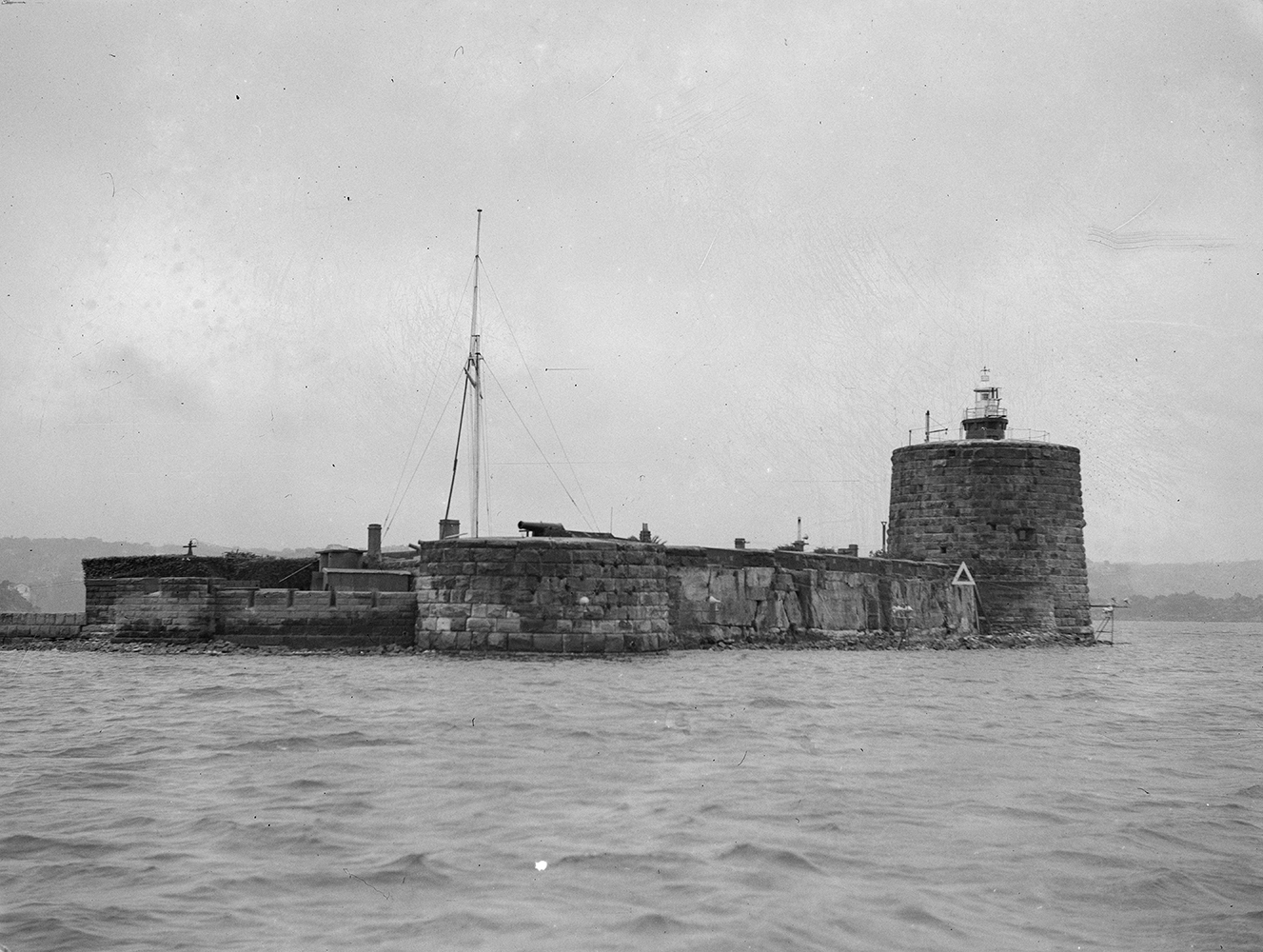
Fort Denison, Sydney, c. 1935

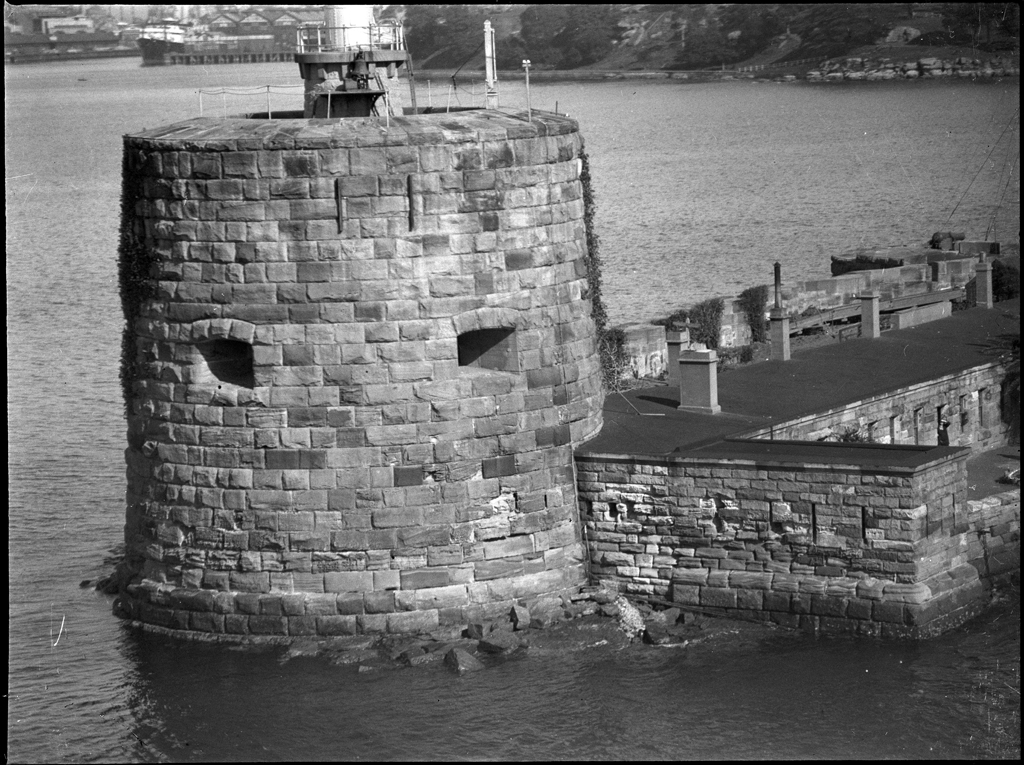
Fort Denison circa 1930

In May 1942, three Japanese two-man midget-submarines attacked Sydney Harbour. When the US Navy cruiser USS Chicago fired on the Japanese, some of its 5-inch (130 mm) shells hit Fort Denison, causing the tower minor damage which remains visible.

==== Explosive prank ====
In October 1900, as the Boer war raged in Africa, the White Star Line ship SS Medic sailed into Sydney Harbour and dropped anchor in Neutral Bay. One night, the fourth officer, Charles Lightoller and two shipmates rowed to Fort Denison and climbed the tower with a plan to fool locals into believing a Boer raiding party was attacking Sydney. They hoisted a makeshift Boer flag on the lightning conductor and fired a harmless wad of cotton waste from one of the 8-inch cannons. The blast shattered a few of the fort's windows but caused no other damage. Lightoller was never apprehended but confessed to his company's superiors and related the whole story in an autobiography. He was transferred to the Atlantic route and went on to be the second officer of the RMS Titanic and the most senior officer to survive the 1912 sinking of the ship. He was a key witness at both the British and American inquiries into the disaster.

== Current use ==
=== Recent restorative works ===
Since 1992, the NSW National Parks & Wildlife Service, which manages the site, has spent around A$2m conserving and upgrading the facilities. EnergyAustralia also made a significant contribution for the work via the Foundation for National Parks and Wildlife.

Following publication of a conservation plan, further renovation commenced in 1999 and was completed in 2001. The conservation and adaptive re-use of the island was awarded the NSW Royal Australian Institute of Architects (RAIA) Conservation Award; a Commendation in the National RAIA Awards; and a National Trust Heritage Award in 2001.

Increased harbour traffic has already destroyed the slipway. Furthermore, the porous sandstone drinks in the salt right down to the fort's foundations. In 2007 the government announced a $1.5 million rescue package. Fort Denison is now home to more than 100 birds.

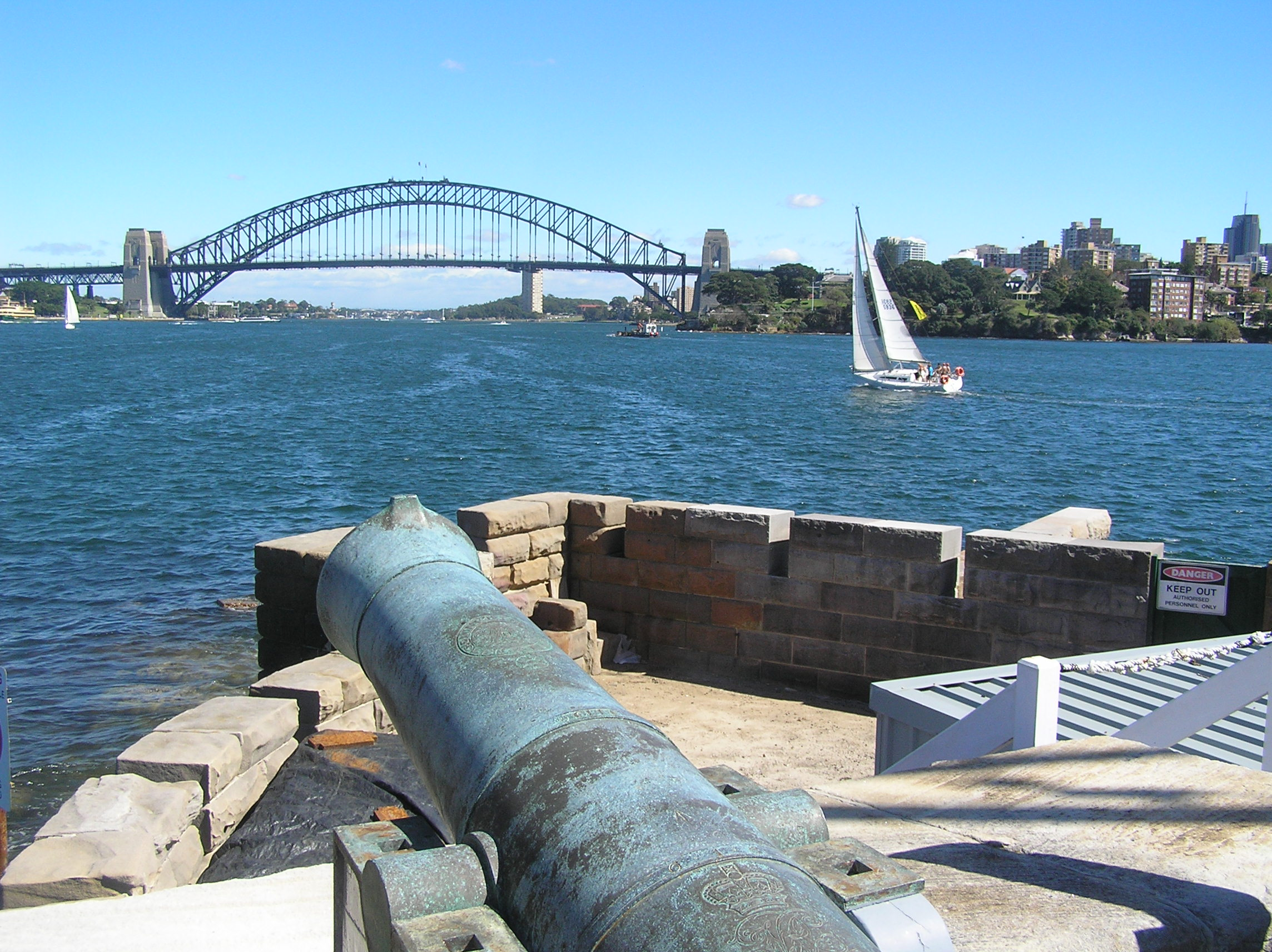
Viewing west from the southern bastion

Fort Denison remains closed to visitors for service upgrades and conservation works until mid-2025. Fort Denison is a museum, tourist attraction, restaurant, and popular location for wedding receptions and corporate events. The tourist facility contains an exhibition of the island's history from Aboriginal times. Access to Fort Denison is via a ferry that departs Wharf 6 at Circular Quay every 45 minutes, 7 days a week. The price of the ferry ticket includes the landing fee. Guided tours of the island, including the Martello tower are at an additional cost. NSW National Parks & Wildlife Services conducts the tours.

In 2004 the NSW National Parks & Wildlife Service restored the lighthouse beacon, which is still in use and supports operation of a Harbour Navigational Facility, with tide gauge, navigation channel markers, foghorn and beacon, established in the mid-19th century. The Bureau of Meteorology operates a weather facility from the island and publishes observations at half-hourly intervals on its website.

The custom of firing a gun daily at 1pm began in 1906 to enable sailors to set their ship's chronometers correctly. The daily gun continued until World War II when the authorities stopped it for fear of alarming residents. The practice recommenced in 1986.

=== Restaurant on the Island ===
The Fort Denison Restaurant was opened on the island in 2006, although the restaurant lease expired in June 2017 and is yet to be renewed. Throughout the years since it has been voted in the top five waterfront restaurants worldwide by the Sydney Morning Herald, and was open for lunch seven days a week year round, dinners on a Sunday, and for special events and occasions which can be found on their website. Bookings for major occasions, such as New Year's Eve, were coveted.

=== Popular culture ===
Fort Denison was the location of the 1959 film The Siege of Pinchgut, released in the United States as Four Desperate Men. Directed by Harry Watt, written by Jon Cleary and starring Aldo Ray, the production was the final Australian film of the British-based Ealing Studios. The island also featured as the base of operations for Neville Savage in the sixth episode of the Australian children's television show Mission Top Secret. Fort Denison was often seen in the television series Water Rats. One episode in season two of the show, End of the Line, featured a party on the island.

== Description ==
Fort Denison on Sydney Harbour is within the visual catchment of the Sydney Opera House, the Sydney Harbour Bridge, the Royal Botanic Garden and the Sydney Harbour Naval Precinct. Fort Denison is the only Sydney Harbour island which is no longer described as an island. Even Garden Island, now visually part of the mainland (and anything but a garden) is still known as an island. The island known as Mattewanye (small rocky island) to Aborigines and Rock Island to the first settlers, is now popularly known as Fort Denison and viewed as a built artefact rather than an island.

From a distance no evidence of its original island character is apparent, except perhaps scattered rocks at low tide. However, on close inspection the sandstone bedrock visible below the south west battery reveals part of the rock of the island, particularly when combined with the pictorial evidence provided by drawings such as that by Barrington in 1802.

The Fort
The visual impact of the fort is a combination of the strong vertical mass of the Martello tower and the equally strong horizontal lines of the low barrack and battery buildings. The two distinct building forms reflects the history of the staged Fort construction; which progressed from the original horizontal form of the battery, and later construction of the barracks and Martello tower. The tower, which only lost its dominant role in marking the water entrance to the city with the construction of the Sydney Opera House, was built with an open gun platform (terreplein) which surmounted two internal levels. A section through the tower, shows the navigational light which replaced the upper cannon in 1913. The lower internal level contained rooms for the storage of gunpowder and provisions and the middle level still houses the three original cannons. Internal tower circulation is via a spiralling staircase that connects the three tower levels. External access to the tower is through a single external door from the upper terrace level battery and bastion.
Three major elements comprise the strong horizontal section of the fort; the battery and bastion, the barracks and terrace.
Gun Battery and Bastion
The outward facing defensive side of the fort known as the gun battery and bastion confronted incoming ships. It is constructed out of the island's sandstone bedrock. The battery consists of an open working area which services a series of nine gun placements and corresponding slanted firing openings which are equally positioned along the raised parapet wall of the battery. An underground water tank has been cut into the bedrock of the battery. The bastion located at the southern end of the battery was constructed to house a single cannon set behind a raised stone parapet. The cannon was located on a raised circular revolving mount to maximise the cannon's aim of fire.
Wet Ditch and Breakwater
A wet ditch and breakwater formed by sandstone blocks separates the fort from the open harbour channel. Beyond this is a breakwater which surrounds the whole island which moderates the wave action against the stone fabric of the fort.
Barrack
The main single storey building is the barrack, its eight chimneys indicate its original accommodation purpose. The barracks are built into cut back bedrock and contain a row of single rooms used for military bunk-style accommodation for the lower ranks as well as accommodation for two separate officers' quarters. A central breezeway and vault covered staircase allows access from the barracks and lower terraces to the upper terrace battery, bastion and Martello tower. The two end rooms adjoining the barracks, known as the Tide Gauge Room to the north and the West Room to the south, were constructed soon after the completion of the barracks. The loopholes, or angled openings, were designed to enable the defensive fire whilst defending against enemy attack.
Terrace
The lower north west facing terrace is constructed on the same level as the barracks. It was probably built on rubble fill which is contained by a low stone wall.
The terrace is open and not defensive in nature, as it faces away from the open sea and potential attack. It currently has a bitumen surface and several small planted garden beds. Garden beds were constructed on this terrace during the 20th century as part of the domestication of the fort by the Sydney Harbour Trust and later Maritime Services Board caretakers. Two sewerage treatment units which service the toilets are concealed in the garden beds at either end of the barracks.
Plantings
A Canary Island date palm (Phoenix canariensis) planted in one raised garden bed on the terrace's western side and a fruiting fig tree (Ficus carica cv.) at the south-west base of the Martello Tower are the only trees on Fort Denison.
An external cannon is on the Eastern Terrace. A tall flag pole with side spars runs three permanently flown flags on this terrace.

=== Condition ===
As at 26 May 2014, the physical condition is excellent. Archaeological potential is high. Published material on such towers in the English speaking world suggests that this may well be the most intact tower.

=== Modifications and dates ===
The following modifications have been made to Fort Denison:

- 1840–1842 – construction of battery
- 1856–1858 – construction of battery, barrack and tower and bastion
- 1858–1862 – construction of terrace, west room and tide gauge room
- 1917 – construction of slipway

== Heritage listing ==
Fort Denison was listed on the New South Wales State Heritage Register on 2 April 1999 .

== Tide gauge ==
Tides have been measured at Fort Denison since 1857 on completion of the fort, initially using a bench mark cut into the stonework of the Martello Tower. From 1867 successive instruments were used as tide measuring technology developed. (The measurements since 1914 are graphed by Bureau of Meteorology).

The Fort Denison photographs below show float activated tide gauge instruments in a cabinet and the system's stilling well. A wire connected to the upper drum mechanism passes out through the bottom right of the cabinet and runs over a pulley to drop down to the float system in the large pipe in the well. This system is now obsolete at Fort Denison but maintained as a museum exhibit. To the right of the large pipe in the well is an enclosed pipe which rises to the active modern system.

Tide heights and times at Fort Denison are the primary base referent for published tide information for other places in the state of New South Wales.

Tide gauge installation and instrumentation at Fort Denison
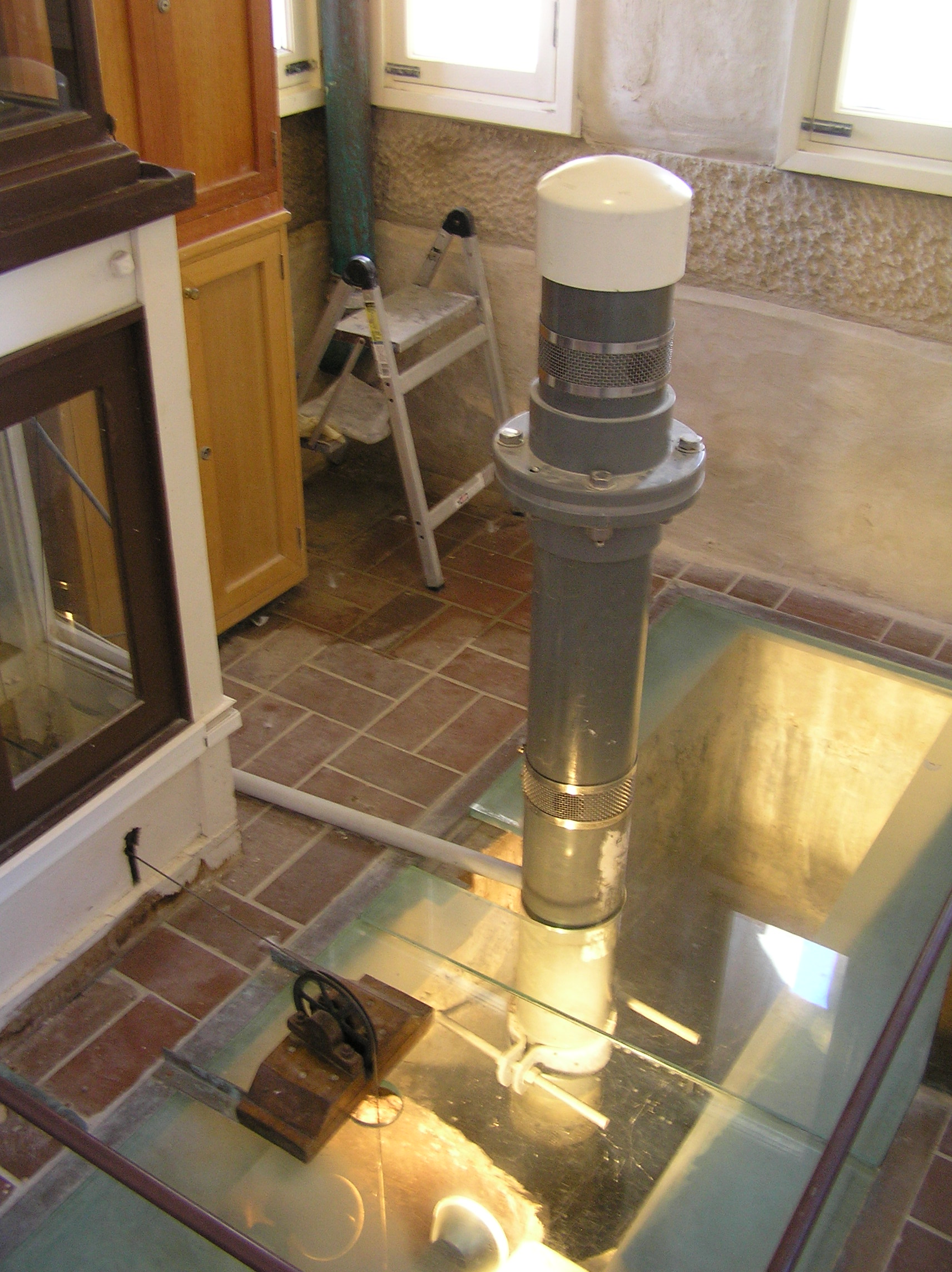
Tide gauge installation: old and new

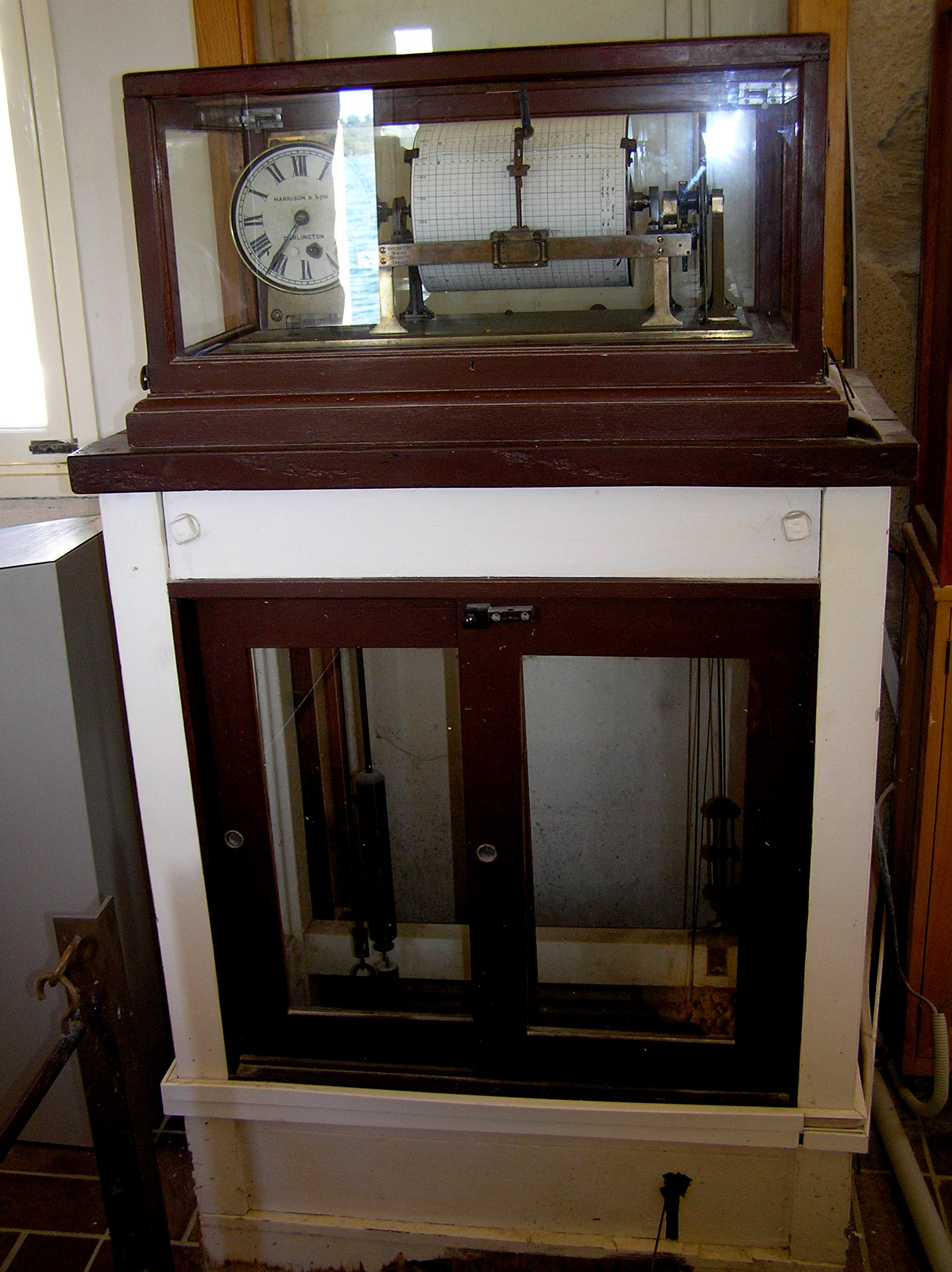
Obsolete instruments

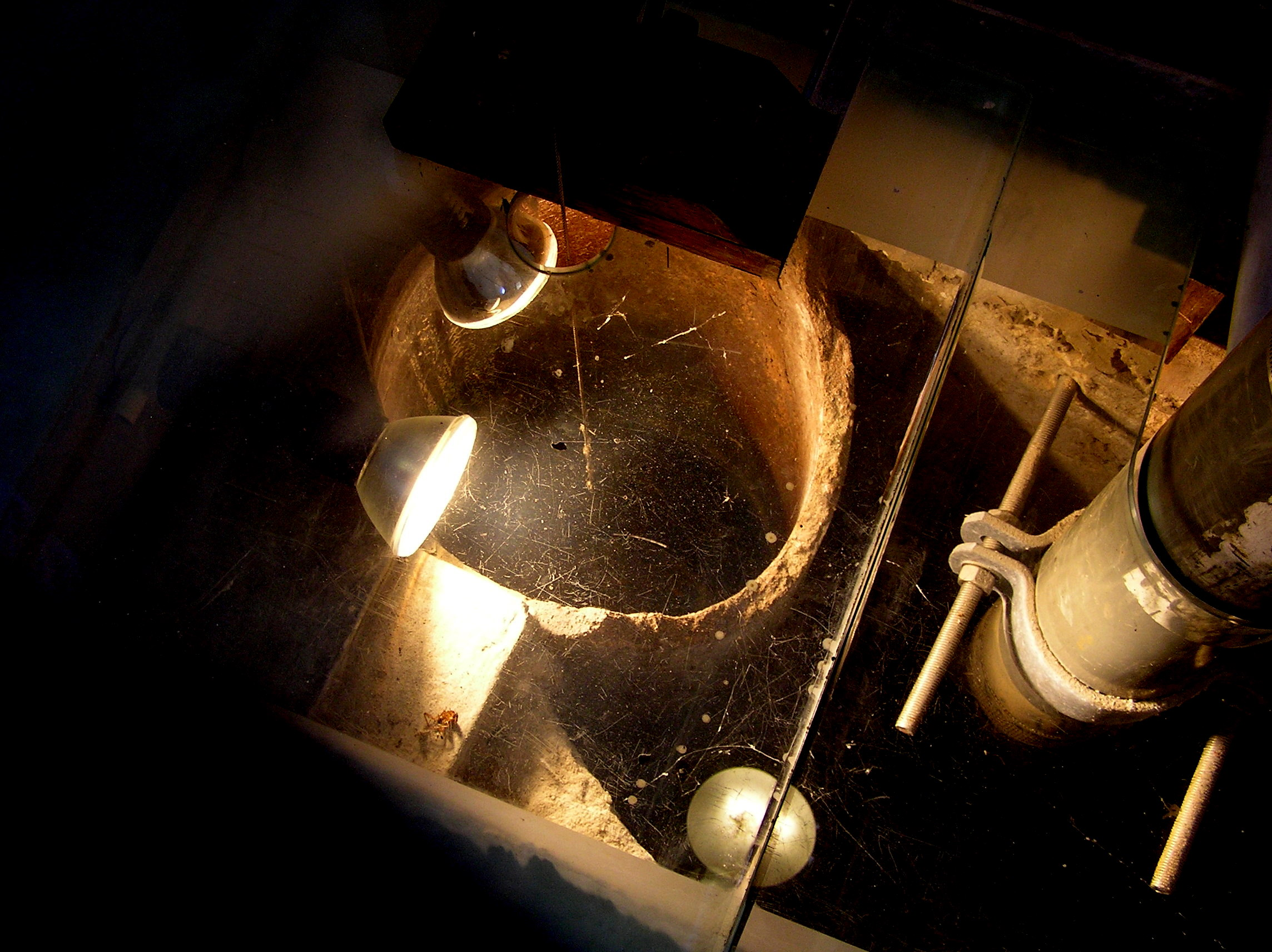
Historic and current (right) stilling wells.

== Gallery of guns ==
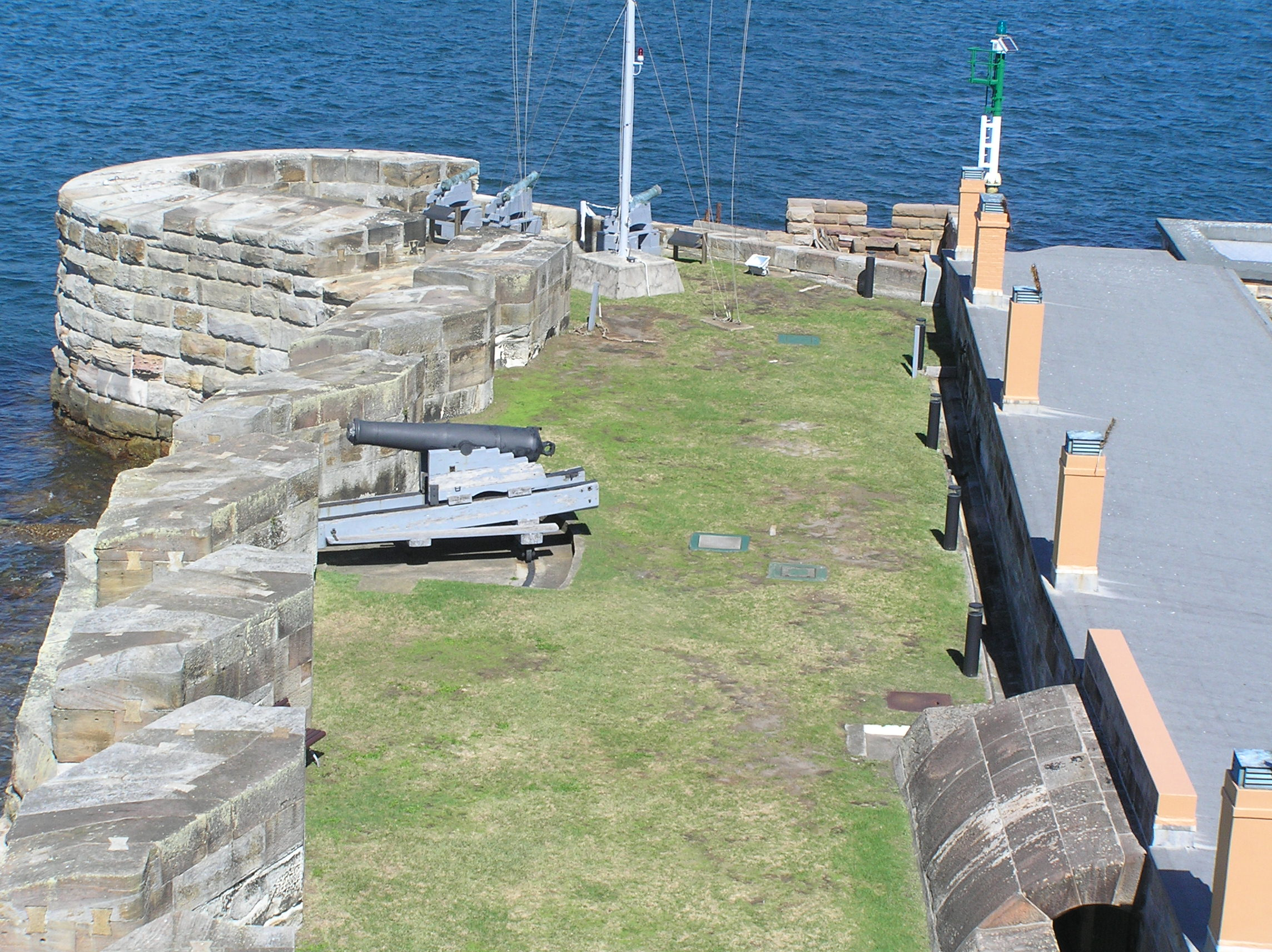
Viewing from tower to southern bastion

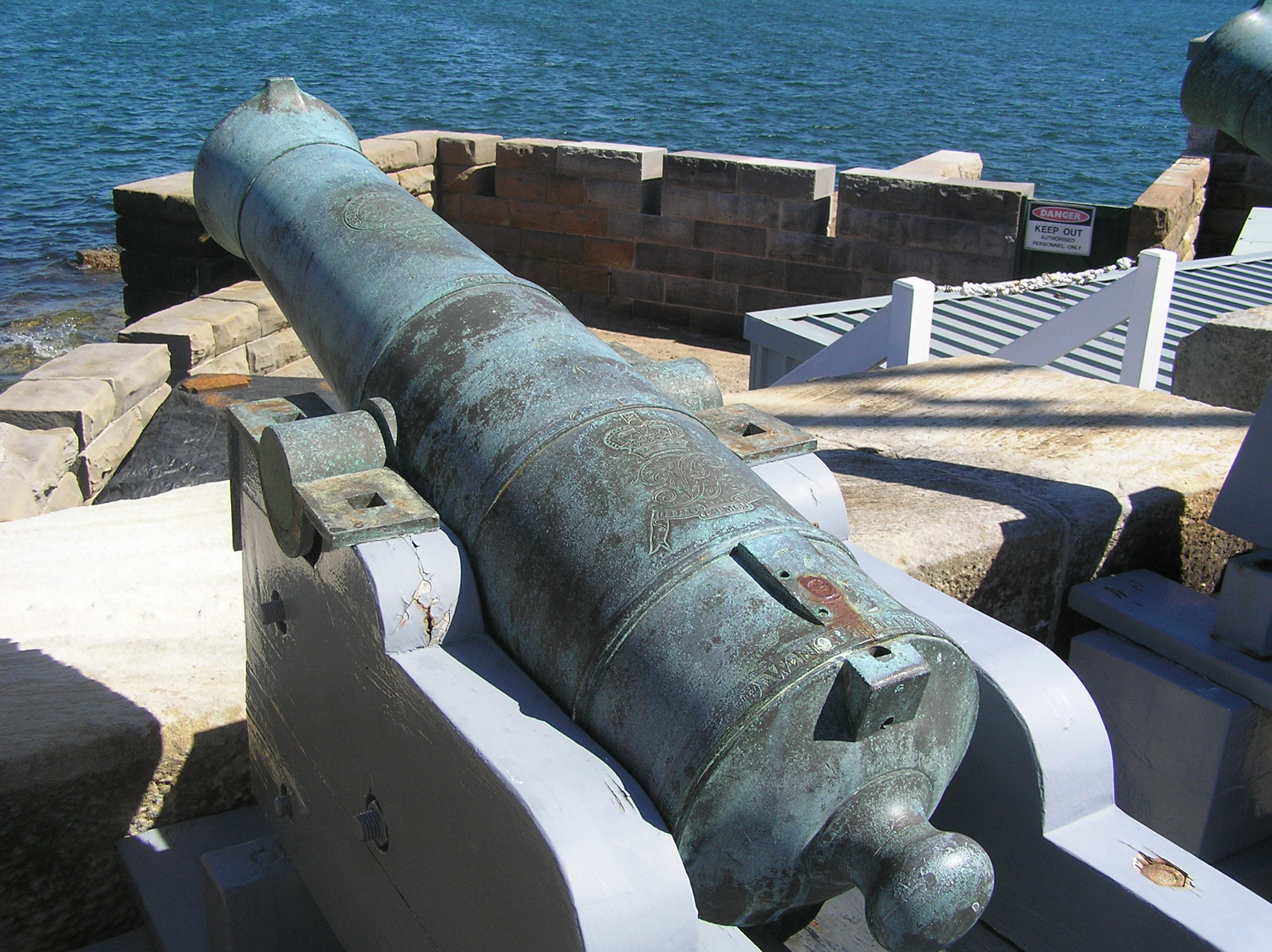
Gun – southern bastion

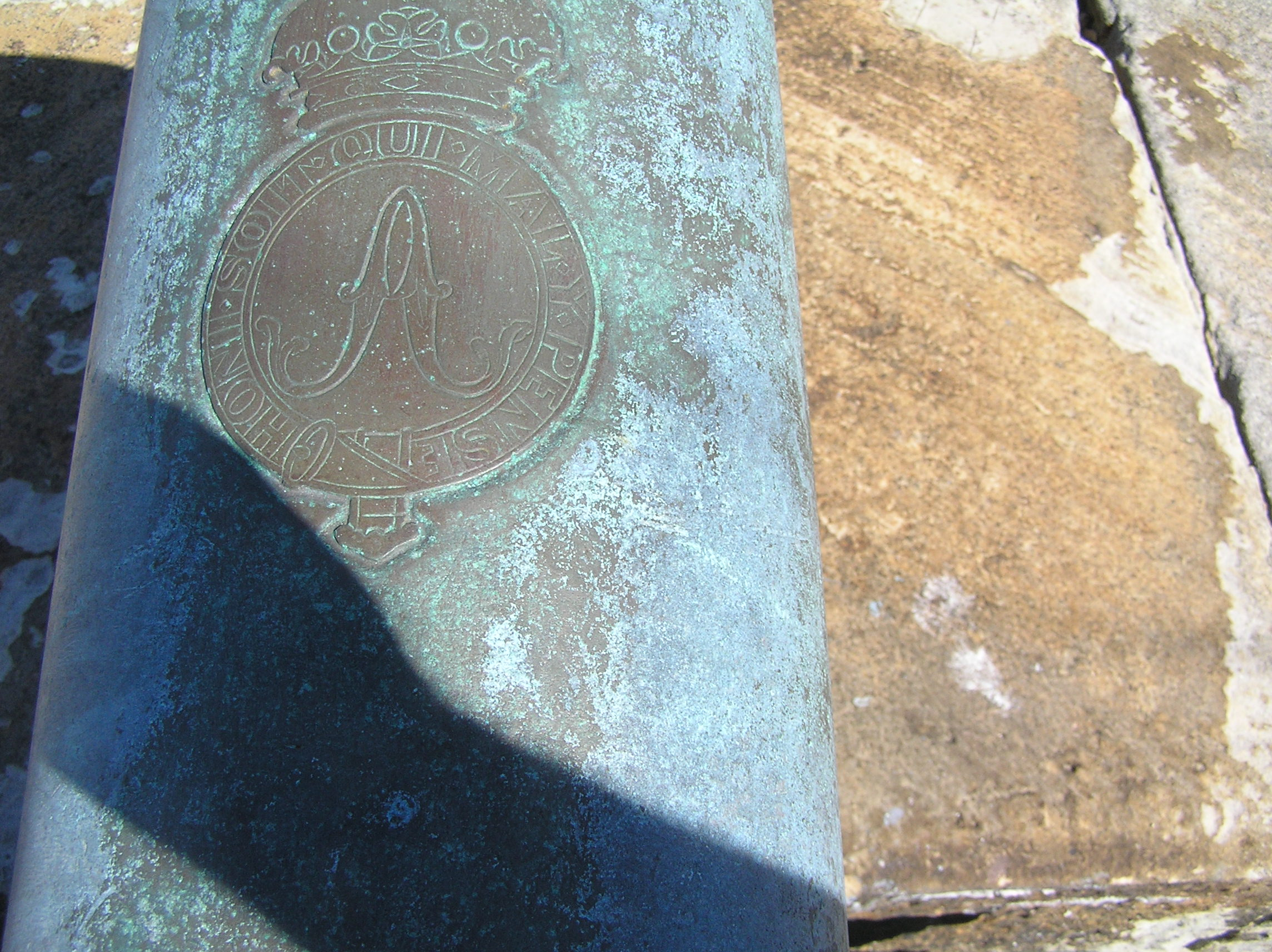
Gun inscription: Honi soit qui mal y pense

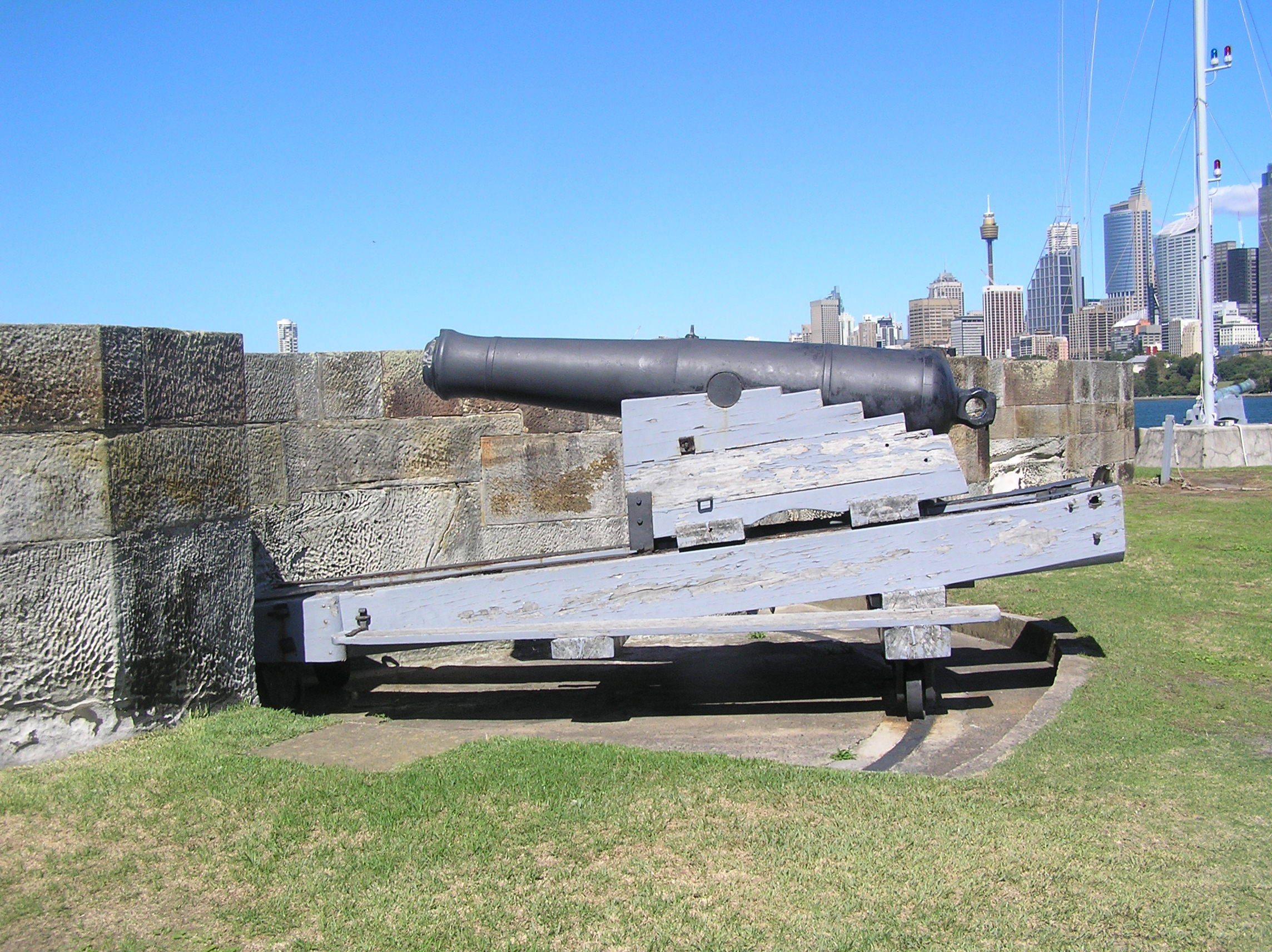
Gun at east-facing wall

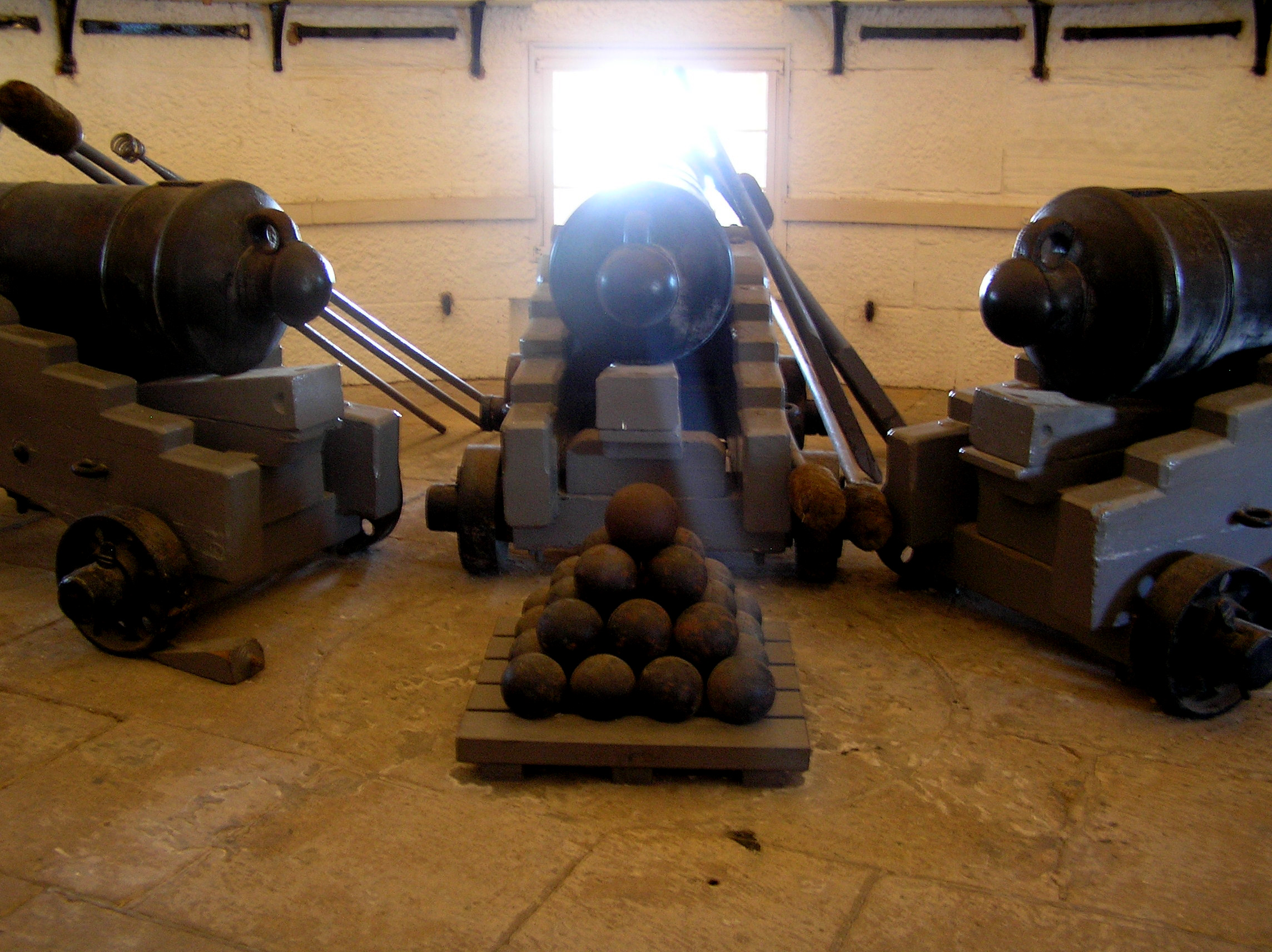
Gun room in the Martello tower

== See also ==
- Punishment in Australia
