= The Australian Women's Weekly =

Monthly magazine

- Julia Gillard on the July 2010 cover
- Editor-in-chief: Sophie Tedmanson
- Categories: Women's magazines
- Frequency: Monthly
- Circulation: 459,175 (2013)
- Founded: 1933; 93 years ago
- Company: Are Media
- Country: Australia; New Zealand
- Based in: Sydney
- Language: Australian English
- Website: www.womensweekly.com.au
- ISSN: 0005-0458

The Australian Women's Weekly, sometimes known simply as The Weekly, is an Australian monthly women's magazine published by Are Media in Sydney and founded in 1933. For many years it was the number one magazine in Australia before being outsold by the Australian edition of Better Homes and Gardens in 2014. As of February 2019, The Weekly has overtaken Better Homes and Gardens again, coming out on top as Australia's most read magazine. The magazine invested in the 2020 film I Am Woman about Helen Reddy, singer and feminist icon.

== History and profile ==
The magazine was started in 1933 by Frank Packer and Ted Theodore as a weekly publication. The first editor was George Warnecke and the initial dummy was laid out by William Edwin Pidgeon who went on to do many famous covers over the next 25 years. It was to have two distinctive features; firstly, the newspaper's features would have an element of topicality, and secondly the magazine would appeal to all Australian women, regardless of class, and have a national focus. Wanting it to appeal to a mass audience, Warnecke hoped The Weekly would be a sign that Australia finally was coming out of the Depression. Jean Williamson was hired (moving from the Sydney Morning Herald) where she was surprised to find that she was the editor for "fiction". Soon letters were arriving from women who were obviously lonely and light fiction brought them comfort.

In the coming decades, The Weekly became Australia's foremost publisher of light fiction, mostly from England but also Australian, and though its readership was mostly women, many men were avid readers. Australian authors who were well supported include Margot Neville, Mary Gilmore, Lennie Lower, Ross Campbell, Frank Dalby Davison and Henrietta Drake-Brockman. Australian artists who enlivened the prose included W. E. Pidgeon, Virgil Reilly and Wynne W. Davies. The cartoon strip Mandrake the Magician was a longtime competitor to The Phantom in rival magazine The Australian Woman's Mirror. Both strips were the work of American cartoonist Lee Falk. From 1955-1959 the magazine awarded a contemporary art prize.

By 1961, the publication had a circulation of 800,000.

The Weekly celebrated its 50th anniversary of publication in June 1983 and its 75th anniversary in the October 2008 issue was published by then Editor-in-Chief Robyn Foyster. The silver foil cover featured Nicole Kidman and Hugh Jackman with an exclusive interview about their upcoming film, 'Australia'. The 75th Birthday was marked with an anniversary party of 75 VIP guests at Fort Denison in Sydney. Robyn also re-introduced The Australian Women's Weekly Book Club which was launched at an event in Sydney in 2008 by award-winning writer Di Morrissey, who had begun her career as a cadet at The Australian Women's Weekly. Publishing and Broadcasting Limited (PBL) launched Women's Weekly versions in Singapore (1997) and Malaysia in 2000. The magazine in each country follows the Australian Weekly's writing style, while its content is idiosyncratic to the country. In 2012 the parent company of the magazine, ACP Magazines, a subsidiary of Nine Entertainment, was acquired by the Bauer Media Group. Audited circulation under Nene King was 980,000. The 60th anniversary edition sold in excess of one-million. Audited circulation in June 2013 was 459,175 copies monthly. Readership numbers for September 2014 were estimated to be 1,828,000.

In mid-June 2020, the Sydney–based investment company Mercury Capital acquired The Australian Women's Weekly as part of its acquisition of Bauer Media's Australian and New Zealand magazine brands. In late September 2020, Mercury Capital rebranded Bauer Media as Are Media, which took over publication of the Woman's Weekly.

=== Cultural impact ===
The overall popularity of the magazine between the 1930s and 1980s meant that articles and advertisements published in it were widely read across Australia, not only by women, but men as well. The magazine's power to influence and shape culture across the nation intersected with the rise of various women's and parenting issues. In a review of issues published between the 1930s and 1980s, historians have argued that The Australian Women's Weekly promoted school uniforms for children at a time when school uniforms were not mandatory across the country. This promotion, mainly through targeted coverage of school aged children, shaped views of motherhood and child-rearing throughout Australia. Publications in the magazine focused on products, children's fashion, and celebrity children continue to shape readers views of motherhood and child-rearing.

== Format and frequency ==
The magazine is usually 240 pages long and printed on glossy paper trimmed to A4 page size, although it was originally a tabloid in size and layout. It typically contains feature articles about the modern Australian woman. For many years, it included a lift-out TV guide.

In 1982, publication frequency was reduced from weekly to monthly. "Weekly" was retained in the name for reasons of familiarity and because a woman's "monthly" was a slang term for menstruation. The final weekly edition was dated 15 December 1982, followed by the first monthly edition dated January 1983. The TV guide was discontinued on introduction of the monthly format.

== Editors ==
Editors-in-chief of The Weekly over the years have included George Warnecke (1933–1939), Alice Mabel Jackson (1939–1950), Esmé (Ezzie) Fenston (1950–1972), Dorothy Drain (1972–1975), Ita Buttrose (1975–76), Jennifer Rowe (1987–1992), Nene King, Dawn Swain (1994–2000), Deborah Thomas (1999–2015), Julia Zaetta (2005–06), Robyn Foyster (2007–2009), Helen McCabe (2009–2016), Kim Wilson (2016–17), Juliet Rieden (who was acting Editor-in-Chief in 2016 and 2017 and then Editor before moving to Editor-at-Large from 2018) and Nicole Byers (2017–2023) and Sophie Tedmanson was appointed as the new Editor in October 2023.

Robyn Foyster, the editor-in-chief from 2007 to 2009 and later Group Publisher at ACP and Bauer, put Barack and Michelle Obama on the cover of the January, 2009, edition to mark Barack Obama becoming the first black President of the United States. The Obama's were also the first black cover stars of The Weekly. Helen McCabe, the editor-in-chief from August 2009 until January 2016, claimed to improve The Weekly's news coverage. She told The Australian she would not coverPrince William trip to Australia because he refused to give an interview to the magazine.

In late 2009, she hired Juliet Rieden as deputy editor (Rieden was later promoted to Editor and Acting Editor-in-Chief) and Jordan Baker, formerly a reporter and travel writer for The Sydney Morning Herald, as news editor. In February 2016 Kim Wilson was named as the editor-in-chief of the magazine.

In July 2017, Nicole Byers was appointed Editor-in-Chief.

News editors included Les Haylen (from 1933) and Dorothy Drain (from 1958). Nicole Byers stepped down from the role in October 2023 and was replaced by Sophie Tedmanson.

Being editor of The Weekly is often lauded as one of the most prestigious roles in Australian media.

=== Recipes and cookbooks ===
The Australian Women's Weekly Test Kitchen (then known as the Leila Howard Test Kitchen) was established just after World War I. From 1965, it continued to be on the same site of the Australian Consolidated Press (ACP) building (corner of Park and Castlereagh Streets) in Sydney. The Test Kitchen's first 'Best Ever' recipes compilation was published in 1976, collating the most-requested recipes from the issues of the Weekly. The cookbook sold out in days and had many reprints.

The Test Kitchen had a team of 16 people in 2006, comprising chefs, home economists, food editors and support staff.

In 2012, ACP was sold to Bauer Media Group. The Test Kitchen triple-tests recipes which are then published in the magazine, as well as Woman's Day and the AWW cookbooks. Surveys have shown that over 90 per cent of readers buy the magazine for the recipes.

== See also ==
- Australian Women's Weekly Children's Birthday Cake Book
- List of women's magazines
