= Atlas Publications =

Australian book publishing company

- Atlas logo as used on its comic books in 1950
- Type: Proprietary company
- Industry: Publishing
- Genre: Popular fiction; Comics
- Founded: 1947
- Founders: Jack Bellew; George Warnecke; Clive Turnbull
- Defunct: 1958
- Headquarters: 282 Queen's Parade, Clifton Hill, Victoria, Australia

Atlas Publications was an Australian publishing company which operated from 1948 until 1958 and was based in Clifton Hill, a suburb of Melbourne. It published magazines and popular fiction, and the genre for which it was best known, adventure comics. It had no relation to the American company Atlas Comics which was active in the same period.

== History ==
The company was founded in 1947 by Jack Bellew and George Warnecke, two former journalists at The Daily Telegraph, and Clive Turnbull, who at the time was a staff writer and art critic for the Melbourne-based Herald. The company was managed by Peter Ryan, who characterised the founders as "a small syndicate of well-off Melbourne lefty journalists". Warnecke himself would later describe the venture to friends as an "Intelligent Young Man's Guide to Capitalism".

The company achieved a major success with its 1948 series Captain Atom drawn by Arthur Mather and written largely by Jack Bellew under the pen name "John Welles". Captain Atom (no relation to the later American superhero Captain Atom) was one of the few original Australian comic heroes to have his own merchandising and fan club. The comic was originally published entirely in colour, but Atlas followed their chief rival, K.G. Murray, and switched to black and white two years later when the cost of colour printing became prohibitive. Despite the switch to black and white, the Captain Atom series remained successful, running to 64 issues over the next six years. The majority of Atlas's comics publications were reprints of British or American comic strips or Australian versions of them, such as Sergeant Pat of the Radio Patrol (based on two characters of the American strip Radio Patrol) and Brenda Starr with illustrations by Yaroslav Horak, who like Arthur Mather and Andrea Bresciani became a regular artist for Atlas. However, Atlas was best known for its home-grown Australian comics—in addition to Captain Atom, it published Keith Chatto's The Lone Wolf (Note: The Lone Wolf was a Western comic, whose protagonist Luke Jordan was "known throughout the West as an outlaw, who rides the trail of justice by night as the mysterious lone wolf".) and Terry Trowell's Grey Domino. (Note: The Grey Domino character was described on its cover as "Hooded man of mystery - nemesis of crime".)

In 1955, Atlas launched its science fiction magazine, Science Fiction Monthly, which ran for 18 issues and ended in 1957. (Note: Atlas's Science Fiction Monthly is not to be confused with the UK magazine Science Fiction Monthly which was published in the 1970s.) Although it largely published stories reprinted from foreign magazines, including three by A. Bertram Chandler, Science Fiction Monthly also published some original stories such Wynne Whiteford's "Ancestral Home" and articles on the science fiction genre by Forrest J Ackerman. In the mid-1950s Warnecke and Bellew also bought out Frank Packer's interest in the women's magazine Family Circle and began publishing it under the Atlas imprint. Atlas's other publications included Miss Young Romance comics, Heart-Throb photo novels, novelettes of Western stories, a racing guide, and the men's magazines Zowie, Fun and Frolic. In 1954 all three men's magazines were banned from sale in Queensland by the Queensland Literature Board of Review for featuring sex and nudity. Through its associated imprint, Western & United Publishing, the company published reprints of books aimed at teenage girls such as its 1952 How To Get Along With Boys.

Atlas ceased publication in 1958. Jack Bellew had died in 1957. George Warnecke moved to Ireland that same year. Page Publications acquired the rights to some of the Atlas comics such as Sergeant Pat of the Radio Patrol and continued to publish them through the 1960s. Clive Turnbull remained in Melbourne and went on to write a series of biographies, a history of Australia, and a book on Australian art.
