= Captain Atom (Atlas Publications) =

- Cover of Captain Atom #1 (1948 Atlas Publications), art by Arthur Mather.

Publication information
- Publisher: Original: Atlas Publications; Current: Meteor Comics
- First appearance: Captain Atom #1 (January 1948)
- Created by: Jack Bellew (writer); Arthur Mather (artist)

In-story information
- Partnerships: Dr Bikini Rador (aka Larry Lockhart)
- Notable aliases: The Atomic Warrior, the Atom Man, Atoman
- Abilities: Superhuman strength; Superhuman speed; Flight; Emit atomic heat/fusion blasts (hands); Focused air blasts (breath); Near invulnerability
Captain Atom
Publication information
- Publisher: Captain Atom; Atlas Publications; Vixen; Meteor Comics
- Schedule: Monthly
- Genre: Superhero
- Publication date: January 1948 – May 1954
- No. of issues: 64

Captain Atom is an Australian comic book series created and written by Jack Bellew with illustrations by Arthur Mather. It was published from 1948 to 1954, with 64 issues and it also appeared as strips in a number of Australian newspapers. The protagonist, the first to use the name, has no relation to the later American superhero Captain Atom, published by Charlton Comics in 1965 and subsequently by DC Comics in 1987.

== Background ==
The fledgling publishing company Atlas Publications achieved its first major success with its Captain Atom. It was drawn by Arthur Mather, who like Yaroslav Horak and Andrea Bresciani, became a regular artist for Atlas. The character was co-created and written by Jack Bellew under the pen name "John Welles". The character is based on a combination of Fawcett Publications' Captain Marvel and Quality Comics' Captain Triumph (first published in 1941 and 1943 respectively).

The character's origin had identical twin brothers being caught in an atomic bomb blast and becoming fused into one, with Dr. Bikini Rador (a nuclear physicist) being the dominant persona. By shouting the magic word, Exenor!, Rador transforms into his now atomic-powered twin. Rador takes on the identity of Larry Lockhart, an FBI agent, to fight crime, switching places with his brother when situations call for a superhero.

The comic was originally published entirely in colour, but Atlas followed its chief rival, K.G. Murray, and switched to black and white two years later when the cost of colour printing became prohibitive. Despite the switch to black and white, the Captain Atom series remained successful, running to 64 issues over the next six years. The first issue of Captain Atom, which was released in January 1948 sold approximately 100,000 copies and at its peak was selling 180,000 copies. Early issues featured backup stories provided by Mather (Dopey Dan), Stan Pitt (Jim Atlas, Dr Peril of Igogo) and Michael Trueman (Crackajack – Daredevil Trapeze Star).

Captain Atom was one of the few original Australian comic heroes to have his own merchandising and fan club. In the 1950s, the fan club boasted that it had "over 75,000 members".

The character was revived in 1985 and again in 2016 by Gerald Carr, appearing in Meteor Comics' Vixen. Captain Atom, renamed as the Atomic Warrior, featured alongside another 1950s Australian comic book hero, The Panther (created by Paul Wheelahan), and Carr's Vixen and Brainmaster.

There is a visual reference to Captain Atom in the Watchmen comic book. In the origin story of Dr Manhattan (who is based on the Charlton Comics Captain Atom), the character is shown rejecting a helmet, which is part of his US Government-supplied costume. The helmet design and the overall costume, although a different colour, somewhat resemble that of the Atlas Comics Captain Atom. The British artist, Dave Gibbons, may have been familiar with the Australian character.

== See also ==
- 3-D Man
- Firestorm (character)
