= Margot Neville =

Pseudonym of Margot Goyder and Ann Goyder

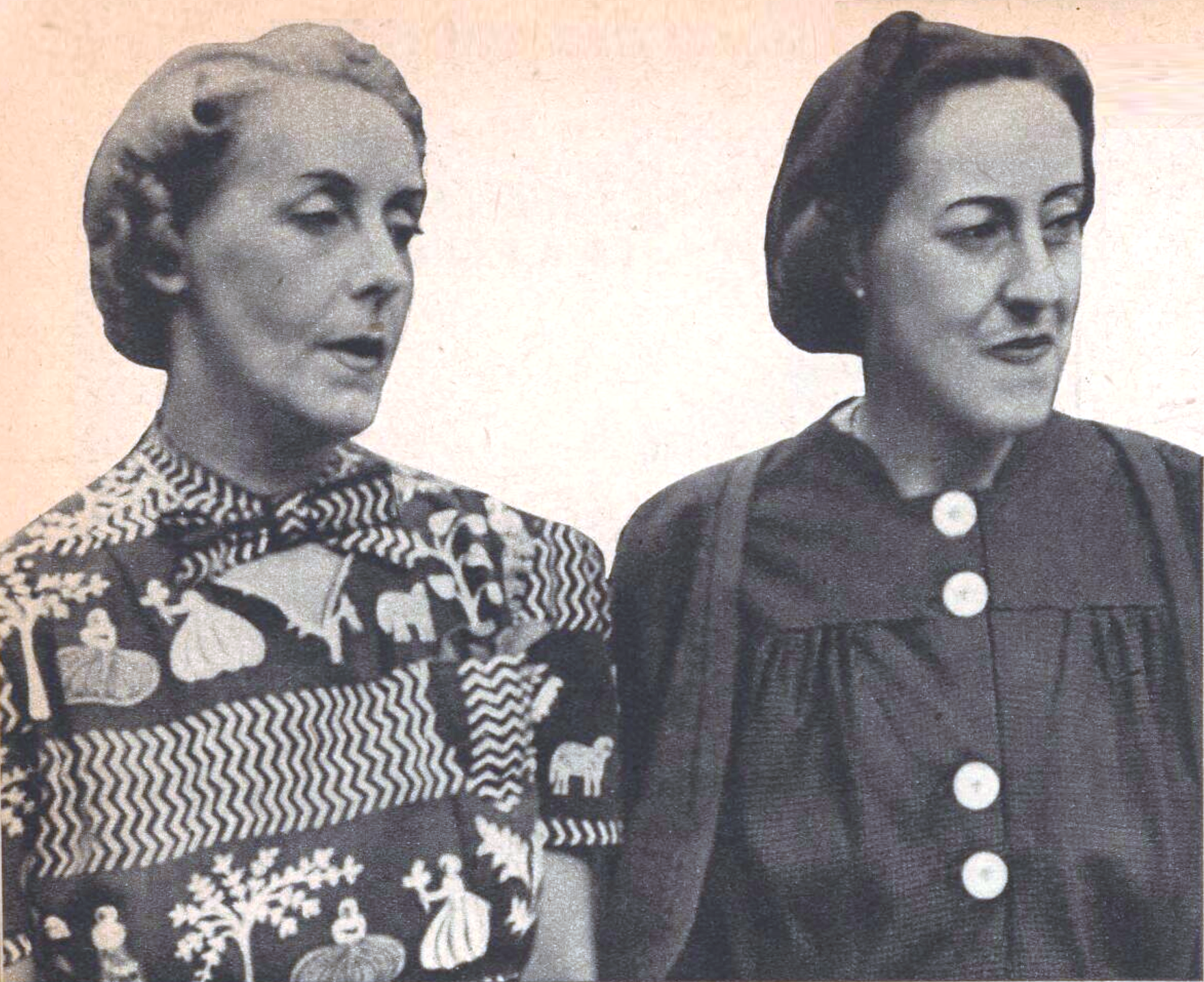
Ann Neville Goyder Joske and Margot Goyder, 1940

Margot Neville was the name adopted by Australian writers Margot Goyder (1896–1975) and her sister Ann or Anne Neville Goyder Joske (1887–1966) for their work: short stories, plays and humorous novels, before they became known for a series of murder mysteries, featuring Inspector Grogan and Detective Sergeant Manning. Much of their work, including some full-length novels, appeared in The Australian Women's Weekly, then the country's foremost publisher of light fiction.

== History ==
Their mode of collaboration was unusual — rather than sharing chapters or each taking care of a particular aspect such as dialogue, every word on paper was a shared decision.

Several short stories were published in London magazines such as the Woman's Home Companion.

Their novel Kiss Proof was published as a serial in London's Evening Standard.

Their play Once a Husband starring Cyril Maude, Owen Nares and Fay Compton was produced at the Haymarket Theatre.

Then came the publication on Saturday 26 October 1935 of Giving the Bride Away by the Australian Women's Weekly in their series of free 32-page "book length" supplements. The Weekly, not unexpectedly, praised the wit of their writing, inviting comparison to P. G. Wodehouse and Ben Travers. Further such publications were Safety First, which, they assured readers, was even better than the first, Kissproof the following year, Jenifer's Husband, Marietta Is Stolen in 1937.

The Weekly also ran within its pages their short stories and humorous essays.

They left for London in 1936 and from April 1937 to September 1938 their weekly "London Letter" was broadcast on ABC Radio 3LO, and from February to July 1940 contributed "Margot Neville's Mailbag" to the Australian airwaves.

Their switch to murder mysteries was signalled by a 1945 serialized short novel Rendezvous with Death, spread over four issues in the Australian Women's Weekly, and introducing Detective-Inspector Grogan and Detective-Sergeant Manning. The Gardenia Case, a year later, was considerably longer — four full pages each week for nine weeks. The Cliffside Case followed in 1948, The Case of Come-hither Bend in 1950, Cyanide for Supper in 1951, The Seagull Said Murder in 1953. Murder of the Well Beloved, earlier a Book of the Month selection in London was republished as a free lift-out supplement the following January. Murder and Poor Jenny was serialized in 1955, and Murder of Olympia in 1956 (year of the Melbourne Olympics) with a twist — readers were invited to solve the mystery before Grogan and Manning. Murder Was Her Welcome was in 1957 their next serial, published before its appearance in Australian bookshops. The Flame of Murder was serialized in 1959 and Sweet Night for Murder in 1960. Murder Beyond the Pale was serialized in 1962 — making them, at 14 books, the Weekly's most published author. Drop Dead was serialized in 1963, Come and See Me Die in 1964 and Head on the Sill in 1966. That may have been the last "Margot Neville" novel published by the Weekly, though their short stories continued to appear spasmodically.

== Works ==
Novels (22 or 24 in all)

- Marietta is Stolen (1922)
- This Can't Be I (1923)
- Safety First (1924) dramatized by Miles Malleson, and produced at the Royalty Theatre
- Kiss Proof (1928)
- Giving the Bride Away (1930)
- Murder in a Blue Moon (1948)
- Murder of the Well-Beloved (1953)
- Murder and Poor Jenny (1954)
- The Hateful Voyage (1956)
- Murder of Olympia (1956)
- Murder to Welcome Her (1957)
- The Flame of Murder (1958)
- Sweet Night for Murder (199)
- Confession of Murder (1960)
- Murder Beyond the Pale (1961)
- Drop Dead (1962)
- Come See Me Die (1963)
- My Bad Boy (1964)
- Head on the Sill (1966)

Plays

- Love at Second Sight (1927), dramatization of their novel Safety First, also filmed
- Wolf! (1931) with Joan Lindsay as "Margot Neville and Lindsay Beckett"
- (with Gerald Kirby) Once a Husband (1932)
- Heroes Don't Care (1936), (Note: Misreported as Horses Don't Care in the Oxford reference.) Rex Harrison starred in the play's London premiere.
- (with Gerald Kirby) Giving the Bride Away (1939)

Short stories

- Holiday's End (1957) in Australian Women's Weekly; many others 1936–1969.

== Criticism ==
- Sydney's Daily Telegraph conceded the high literary standard of Murder and Gardenias, but found execution of the crime ridiculous, and the police protagonists implausible; the only believable Australian fictional detective being Upfield's "Boney".
- The Oxford Companion to Australian Literature observed that, although set in Australia, the murder novels have little "local colour".
