= Fort Denison Light =

Lighthouse in New South Wales, Australia

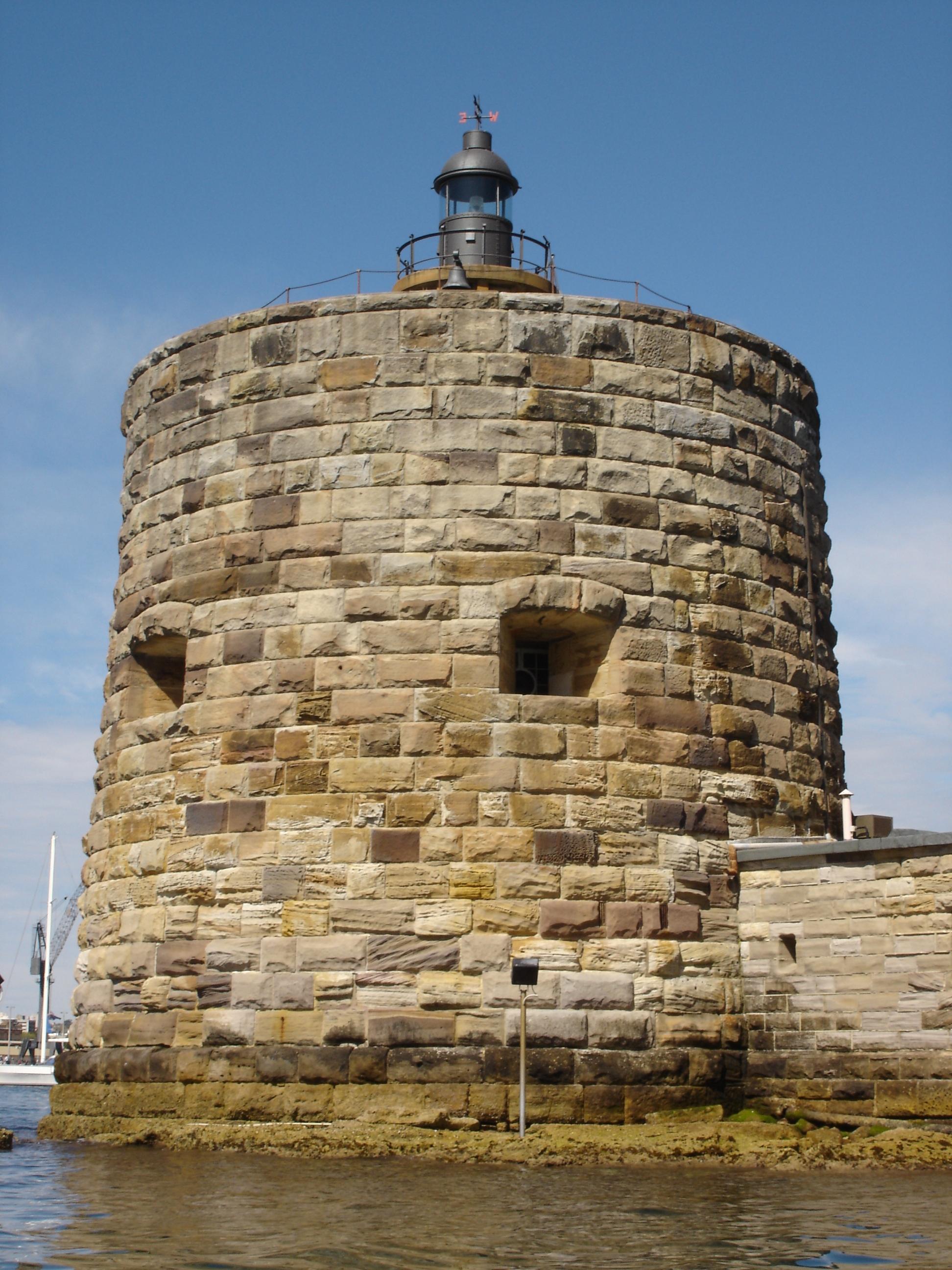
- Fort Denison Light, 2006
- Location: Fort Denison, New South Wales, Australia
- Coordinates: 33°51′16.64″S 151°13′33.69″E

Tower
- Constructed: 1913
- Foundation: Martello Tower
- Height: 20 feet (6.1 m)
- Shape: cylindrical tower with balcony and lantern
- Markings: white tower and black lantern
- Operator: Sydney Harbour National Park
- Fog signal: bell, continuous

Light
- Focal height: 61 feet (19 m)
- Range: 5 nautical miles (9.3 km; 5.8 mi)
- Characteristic: Fl (4) W 15s.

Fort Denison Light, also known as Pinchgut Light, is an active lighthouse located on top of a Martello Tower at Fort Denison, a former penal site and defensive facility occupying a small island on Sydney Harbour, New South Wales, Australia. The island is located downstream from the Harbour Bridge near Potts Point and the Royal Botanic Garden.

== History ==
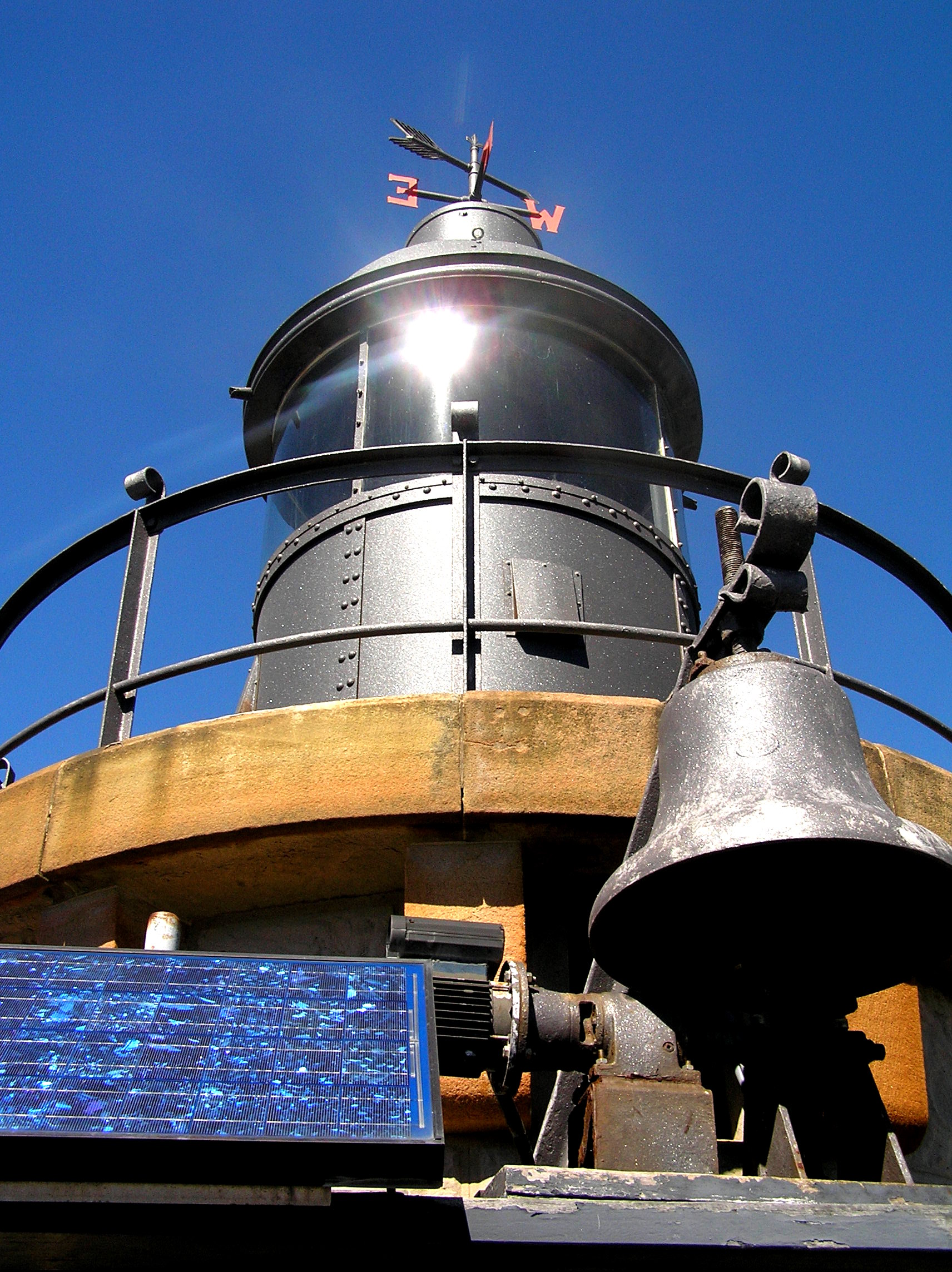
Fort Denison's lantern, bell and solar panel

The lantern and light, built in Birmingham, England, were added on top of the Martello Tower in 1913, replacing an 8 inches (20 cm) gun. The original light source was an acetylene gas carbide lamp, and it was converted to electricity by 1926. The station also includes a tide gauge, established in the mid-19th century, navigation channel markers, and a fog bell.

== Renovation ==
On 30 October 2003, the entire lightroom structure was removed for renovation. As the NSW National Parks & Wildlife Service curator Stephen Thompson said an airlift was the safest way, the lantern was transported to shore by a helicopter in a sling. Renovation took place at a workshop in the nearby St Peters. The entire operation was coordinated by the NSW National Parks & Wildlife Service, Port Authority of New South Wales and Australian Defence Industries.

For the renovation the structure was disassembled, paint was removed and new steel patches were welded onto corroded areas. A replica base ring was fabricated and hot riveted into place. The surface was then painted and treated against corrosion.

On 20 May 2004, the lantern was returned by helicopter and reinstalled.

== Site operation ==
The light is managed by the Port Authority of New South Wales. The site is managed by the NSW National Parks & Wildlife Service since 1992, as part of the Sydney Harbour National Park.

== Visiting ==
The island is accessible by boat. It is open for guided tours for a fee, requiring reservation. The tower is now open to the public.
