= Esmé Fenston =

Australian journalist (1908–1972)

Esmé Fenston OBE
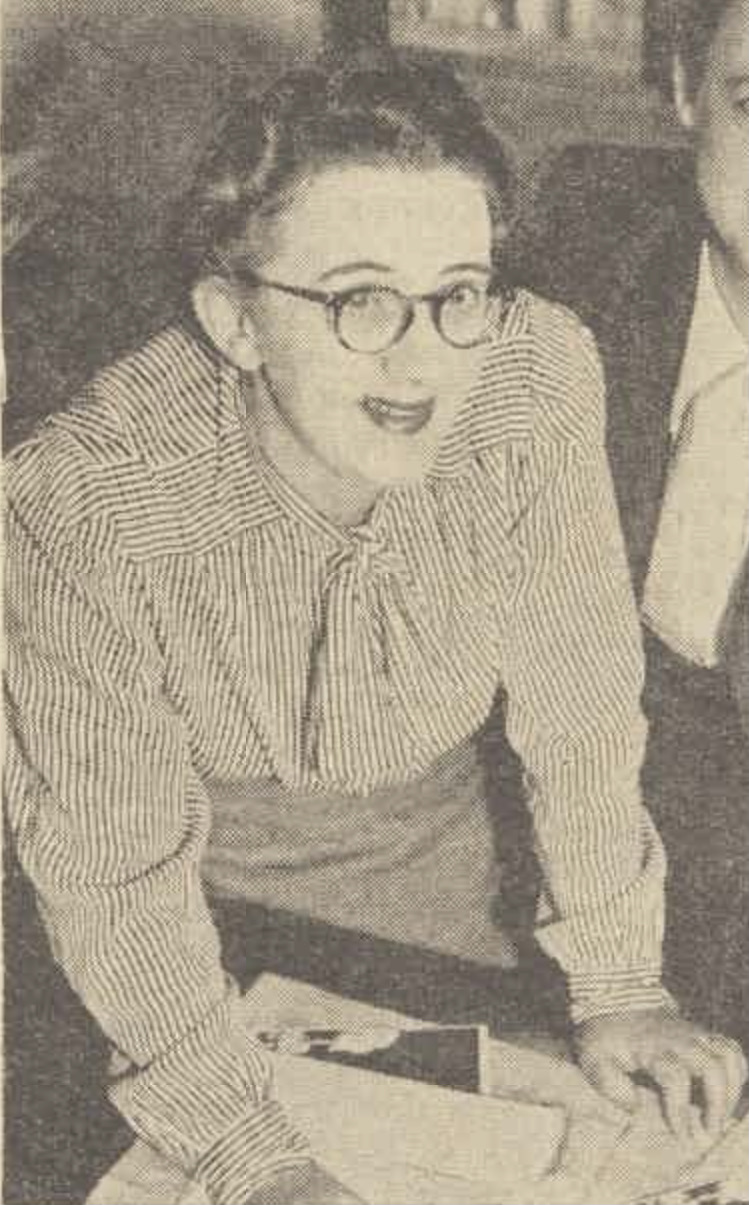
- Fenston in 1947
- Born: Esmé Woolacott; 29 July 1908; Annandale, New South Wales, Australia
- Died: 16 April 1972 (aged 63); North Sydney, New South Wales, Australia
- Occupations: Journalist, editor

Esmé "Ezzie" Fenston OBE (29 July 1908 – 16 April 1972) was an Australian journalist. She was editor of The Australian Women's Weekly for 22 years.

== Early life and education ==
Fenston was born Esmé Woolacott on 29 July 1908 in Annandale, New South Wales. She was the youngest child of furniture salesman Henry Lovell Woolacott and Jane Kate (née Wilmot). She completed her secondary education at Sydney Girls High School.

== Career ==
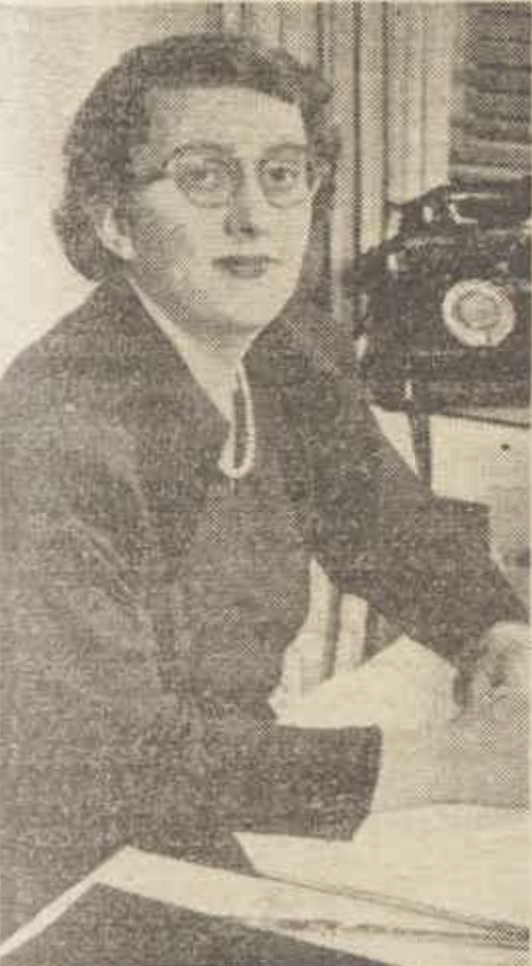
Fenston, following her appointment as editor of The Australian Women's Weekly in 1950

She was employed by The Land to write "The Countrywoman" and the "Beehive" supplements for the paper, following her marriage in 1930 to Jack Fenston.

Fenston joined The Australian Women's Weekly in 1938, where she wrote book reviews before becoming a sub-editor soon afterwards. She took over as editor in 1950 when Alice Mabel Jackson moved to The Weekly's main rival, Woman's Day.

Fenston remained editor of The Weekly until her death on 16 April 1972, following a short illness.

== Awards and recognition ==
In the 1967 Queen's Birthday Honours Fenston was made an Officer of the Order of the British Empire for "service to journalism".

Fenston Place, in the Canberra suburb of Gilmore, is named in her honour. In 2023 the Esme Fenston Fellowship was inaugurated to celebrate the 90th anniversary of The Women's Weekly and in recognition of her contribution to it.
