= Paul Wheelahan =

Australian cartoonist (1930–2018)

- Born: 6 November 1930; Bombala, New South Wales, Australia
- Died: 28 December 2018 (aged 88); Penrith, New South Wales, Australia
- Occupations: Comic book artist, illustrator, author
- Writing career
- Pen name: Brett McKinley; Emerson Dodge; Ben Jefferson; Adam Bonnard; E. Jefferson Clay; Ben Nicholson; Matt James; Ryan Brodie

Paul Wheelahan (6 November 1930 – 28 December 2018) was an Australian comic book writer, artist and illustrator, best known for his creations, The Panther and The Raven.

== Biography ==
Paul Wheelahan was born in Bombala, New South Wales in 1930, the son of a mounted policeman. He grew up in Dalton, New South Wales, during the Great Depression, and was educated in Goulburn and Muswellbrook. In 1947 Wheelahan moved to Sydney to find work and contact his idol, Stan Pitt, whose work, Silver Starr he had long admired.

...when the Sunday Sun and Guardian's Sunbeams comic supplement published episode one of Stanley Pitt's Silver Starr, I freaked. In the hour I first held that comic in my hands, I knew I would be a comic artist and assured everyone of this fact on that same day – including my parents, who were massively unimpressed.

— Paul Wheelahan

Wheelahan became friends with Pitt and from 1949 to 1950 Pitt employed him inking sections of Yarmak – Jungle King and Captain Power. Wheelahan also did artwork for H. John Edwards, including covers for the Fiction House line of reprints and fillers.

H. John Edwards started giving me filler strips of two to four-page comics in [local reprints of] American books, such as Sheena, Queen of the Jungle.

— Paul Wheelahan

One of these filler strips was 'Space Hawk', a science-fiction superhero, which appeared as a back-up feature in Edwards' reprints of Wings and Rangers comics.

At the age of twenty disillusioned by his lack of artistic success and unable to make a living from his artwork Wheelahan went back to live with his family in Armidale, where he worked as a powder monkey on the Oaky River Dam project. During this time, Wheelahan's ten-page Steve Ashley of Africa comic (about a big game hunter in the Belgian Congo) was published by H. John Edwards, as a back-up story in Len Lawson's The Hooded Rider comic book. Encouraged by this, Wheelahan returned to Sydney in 1954 to seek work in the comic industry. He worked as a foundry labourer and process worker whilst freelancing for Edwards, illustrating covers and another two issues of Steve Ashley comics.

In 1955 Wheelahan joined Young's Merchandising and began a career as a full-time comic artist, where he drew Davy Crockett – Frontier Scout, which was first published in December 1955 running for two years and twenty two issues. Wheelahan's next title for Young's was The Panther, which commenced in May 1957 and ran for 73 issues until June 1963. The Panther, capitalised on the huge popularity of The Phantom but was based on Tarzan comics by Burne Hogarth. As a small boy, The Panther was left abandoned in the Congo after his parents had been killed by Mayzak warriors. He was adopted by a band of panthers and as he grew into manhood he was initiated into a native tribe. Because his pale skin hindered him in hunting and stalking he took to wearing a fitted suit of panther skins to make him as dark as his fellow tribesman.

The Panther idea was simply to create a man who looked like a panther and justify his strange lifestyle. I wanted him to be a slinky, stealthy man of the night, and the jungle setting was perfect for this kind of character.

— Paul Wheelahan

Initially the stories were all set in the Congo, but the character soon became involved in adventures all over the world.

Wheelahan followed this with a new comic, The Raven, which ran for ten issues commencing in July 1962. The Raven featured, Lord Ashley, the Seventh Earl of Ravenscourt, who lives in a ruined castle, Ravenscourt Manor, in England, a man wrongly accused of committing a crime, who dedicates himself to avenging injustice. Wheelahan also introduced an evil brother Sebastian and was developing a storyline based on a Cain versus Abel theme.

By the early 1960s, however, Wheelahan's comics were amongst the last original Australian titles being published. Local reprints of American comic books had swamped the market throughout the 1950s. The situation was made worse by the introduction of television in Australia in 1956, followed by the resumption of imports of original, full-colour American comic books. These combined events forced most Australian comic book publishers out of business by the late 1950s. In 1963 the company folded following the death of its founder Charles Young.

In 1957 Wheelahan produced Rex Strong for Magazine Management and later developed both daily and Sunday versions of a newspaper strip based on Arthur Upfield's Napoleon Bonaparte but the strip failed to be syndicated.

Wheelahan then went on to Cleveland Publishing in 1963 writing western novels, writing more than 500 novels under pseudonyms such as Brett McKinley and Emerson Dodge.

I found myself churning [out] the Westerns, but this seemed to result in better stories rather than worse ones. I found the work far easier as I'm a natural writer, whereas I had to teach myself to draw.

— Paul Wheelahan

John Ryan in his Australian Comic anthology, Panel by Panel, describes Wheelahan' style as "sparse and devoid of un-needed detail and similar to US comic artist Steve Ditko, with the strength of Wheelahan's comic lying in his storylines."

In 1996 Wheelahan wrote his last story for Cleveland Publishing, briefly becoming involved in television screenwriting. He created and wrote the children's TV series Runaway Island, about two orphans living in Sydney during the 1830s, which screened on the Seven Network in 1982. He also wrote several episodes of the soap opera A Country Practice and was also commissioned to collaborate with Michael Laurence to write a twenty-episode sequel to the TV mini-series, Return to Eden, which was never produced.

Wheelahan subsequently set up his own business, Dodge Publishing, to print and distribute his own work, releasing three self-published novels, Savage Texas, Arizona Psycho and Sons of Cain. Unable to compete with Cleveland Publishing's popular range of western 'pulp' novels, he began writing for the British book publisher, Robert Hale Ltd, which produce the Black Horse Western series in the UK and North America. Wheelahan later resided in Emu Plains, New South Wales and was writing his autobiography (nominally titled Never Ride Back, which was also the title of his first story for Cleveland Press).

He died on 28 December 2018.
