= Arthur Mather =

Australian cartoonist, illustrator and novelist

- Born: Arthur Richard Mather; 22 November 1925; Melbourne, Australia
- Died: 4 June 2017 (aged 91)
- Occupations: cartoonist; illustrator; novelist
- Known for: Captain Atom

Arthur Richard Mather (22 November 1925 – 4 June 2017) was an Australian cartoonist, illustrator, and novelist. He was the creating artist (and later also the writer) of one of Australia's most successful comics series, Captain Atom. From the late 1950s until 1975 he worked in advertising and in his later years became a novelist.

== Life and career ==
Mather was born in Melbourne and educated at Collingwood Technical School. He began working as an apprentice at a newspaper printer in Melbourne when he was 15, but also began drawing sporting, political and gag cartoons for local newspapers and magazines. He briefly attended art classes at the Melbourne Technical College night school but was largely self taught.

In 1947 he was approached by Jack Bellew, who had recently founded Atlas Publications, to create a comic book series for the fledgling company. The result was Captain Atom, one of Australia's first all-colour comics and one of its most enduring home-grown comic heroes. The first issue sold 100,000 copies with a total of a million copies sold in the first year of publication. Captain Atom had its own associated merchandise and a fan club with 75,000 members. Like Yaroslav Horak and Andrea Bresciani, Mather became a regular artist for Atlas, later working on the company's Sergeant Pat of the Radio Patrol and Flynn of the FBI.

When the Australian comic book industry declined in the late 1950s, Mather went into advertising as an illustrator. He went on to become Art Director, and later Creative Director, for George Patterson Advertising. Mather published his first novel, The Pawn in 1975 and retired from advertising to devote himself full-time to writing. He published seven more novels over the next 15 years. Mainly set in America, they were predominantly thrillers and crime novels with elements of science fiction, particularly The Pawn, The Mind Breaker (1980), and The Duplicate (1985).
