= Clive Turnbull =

Australian writer and journalist

Stanley Clive Perry Turnbull (22 December 1906 – 25 May 1975) was an Australian writer and journalist.

He was born in Glenorchy in Tasmania. He joined The Mercury newspaper as a reporter in 1922 and then moved to Melbourne where he worked as a staff writer on The Herald, where in 1942, Murdoch appointed him as art critic, in which role he championed Modernism. He is best known for his book Black War that examined the extermination of Indigenous Australians in Tasmania. He also wrote a series of biographies.

== Bibliography ==
- Black War: The Extermination of the Tasmanian Aborigines, F. W. Cheshire, 1943; Sun Books, 1948 ISBN 0-7251-0183-0
- A Concise History of Australia, Thames and Hudson, 1965.
