= Alice Jackson (editor) =

(1887–1974) journalist and editor

- Jackson in 1941
- Born: Alice Mabel Archibald; 15 October 1887; Ulmarra, New South Wales
- Died: 28 October 1974 (aged 87); Sydney, New South Wales
- Occupation: magazine editor
- Known for: editor of The Australian Women's Weekly
- Predecessor: George Warnecke
- Spouse: Samuel Henry Jackson

Alice Mabel Jackson born Alice Mabel Archibald (15 October 1887 – 28 October 1974) was an Australian journalist and editor of The Australian Women's Weekly.

== Life ==
Alice Mabel Archibald was born on 15 October 1887 in Ulmarra, New South Wales. Her parents were Clara Amelia née Baker, and her New Hebrides born husband William Archibald, a teacher. She completed her education in Perth and began a career as a teacher. During World War I, she married Samuel Henry Jackson who had also been a teacher, but he was then a soldier.

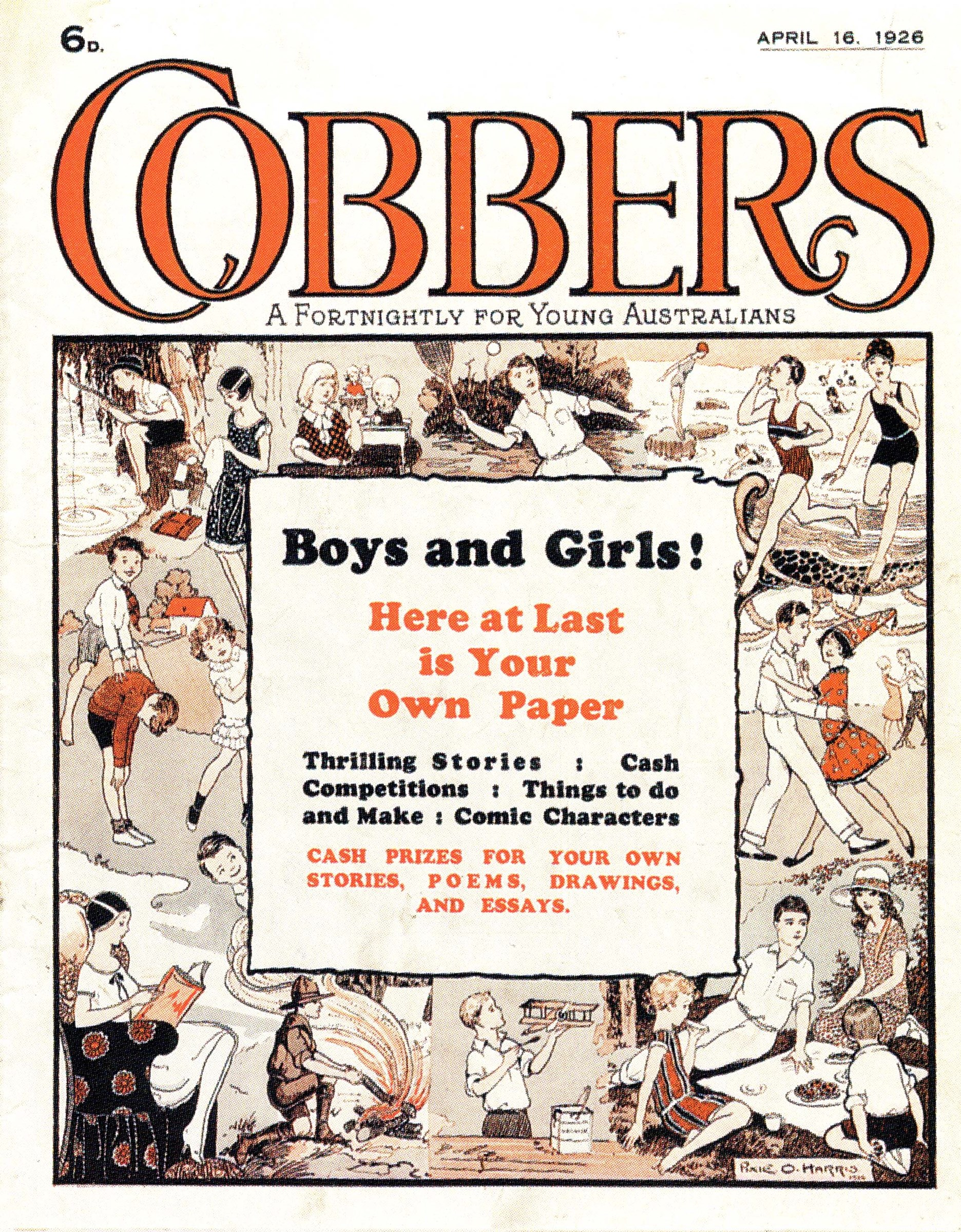
Cobbers - Alice Mabel Jackson was the founding editor in 1926

Triad was an Australian magazine and the publishers thought that a younger magazine might work. Jackson was the editor when Cobbers was launched in 1926.

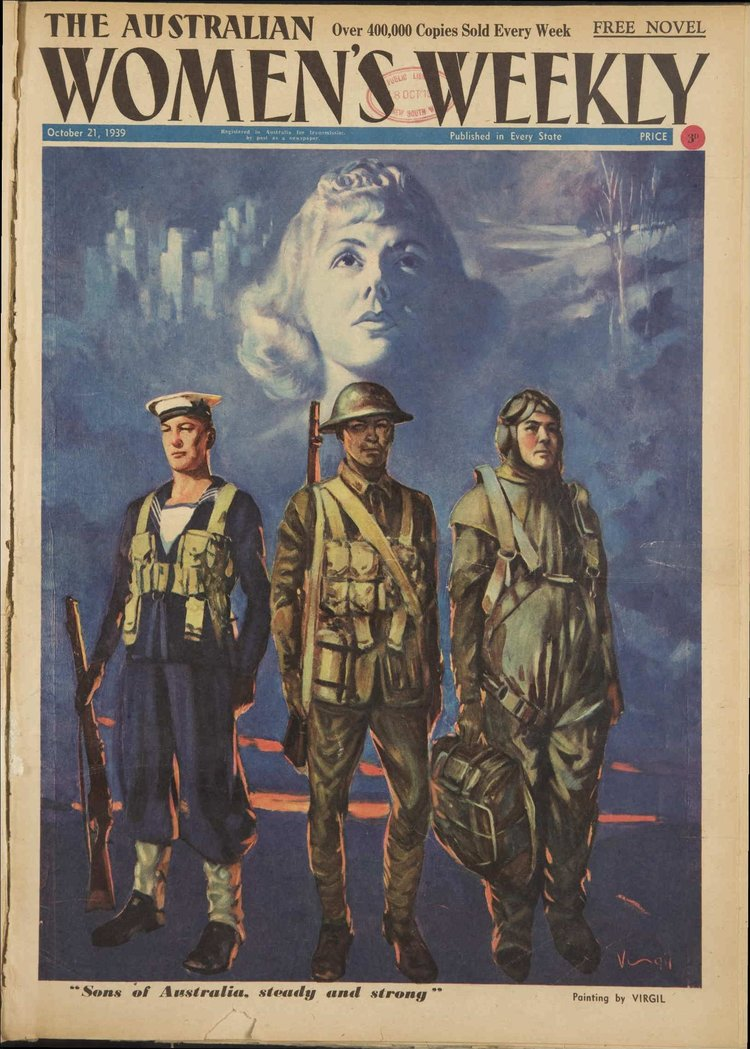
The Australian Women's Weekly in 1939

Jackson was on the staff when The Australian Women's Weekly was launched in May 1933. George Warnecke was its founding editor and he described Jackson as a genius who he had employed. His vision was for the magazine to be a thought-provoking publication which included news. Warnecke had to go abroad from 1934, as the magazine needed improved printing technology. He did not return until 1935, by which time circulation had increased by 60,000 copies. Jackson had become the de facto editor of "the weekly" even though Warnecke was still the nominal editor. Jackson formally became the editor in April 1939. By 1939, the magazine's circulation had reached 400,000 copies a week, and for its first 50 years, it remained the highest selling per capita magazine in the world.

During World War II, she was described as her magazine's special war correspondent as she visited and reported on Australia's forces.

In 1950, Woman's Day gained Jackson as an editor when she moved from the magazine's main rival, The Australian Women's Weekly. Jackson moved to Melbourne to lead Woman's Day.

Jackson died on 28 October 1974 in Sydney. In 2023, The Australian Women's Weekly celebrated its 90th birthday with a three-month exhibition at an art gallery in Bendigo.

Alice Jackson Crescent, in the Canberra suburb of Gilmore, is named in her honour.
