= List of magazines in Australia =

This is a list of Australian magazines including those that are no longer published.

== Architecture ==
- Architecture Australia
- Architectural and Building Journal of Queensland
- Architecture & Design
- Belle
- Building
- Houses

== Arts and entertainment ==
- Art Almanac
- Art Collector
- Art & Australia
- Art in Australia
- ArtAsiaPacific
- Artist Profile
- Artlink
- Australian Art: a Monthly Magazine & Journal
- Australian Art Review (2003–2013)
- Australasian Photo-Review (1894-1956)
- Australasian Sketcher with Pen and Pencil
- Black+White
- Cantrills Filmnotes
- Cinema Papers
- Foxtel
- FilmInk
- IF Magazine
- Light Vision
- Limelight
- Look
- NW
- Pix (1938–1972)
- POL Oxygen
- Radio Call
- RealTime
- Senses of Cinema
- The Adelaide Review (1984–2020)
- The Lorgnette
- Trouble
- TV Times (Australia)
- Voiceworks

== Children ==
- K-Zone
- Mania Magazine
- Our Rural Magazine
- Scientriffic
- Total Girl

== Computers and technology ==
- APC
- Atomic (defunct)
- Australian Apple Review
- Australian NetGuide (defunct)
- DIYODE (defunct)
- Electronics Australia (defunct)
- Electronics Today International (defunct)
- Free Access Magazine
- Macworld Australia (defunct)
- Mega Zone (defunct)
- Nintendo Magazine System (defunct)
- Official PlayStation Magazine
- PC PowerPlay
- PC World
- Silicon Chip
- TechLife
- Your Computer (defunct)

== Consumer advocacy ==
- Choice

== Culture ==
- Arman Monthly
- Dumbo Feather
- Oyster
- R.M. Williams Outback
- Sameway Magazine
- Sneaker Freaker
- Sydney Observer Magazine
- Tasmania 40° South
- The Australian Magazine (1821)
- Yarning

== Finance and business ==
- Australian and New Zealand Wine Industry Journal
- Australian Banking & Finance
- Australian Bartender magazine
- Australian Dairy Foods
- Blue's Country Magazine
- Dun's Gazette for New South Wales
- Inside Retail
- Pacific Islands Monthly
- Your Trading Edge Magazine

== Food and cooking ==
- delicious. magazine
- Donna Hay Magazine
- Menu Magazine
- Gourmet Traveller

== General interest ==
- Australasian Post
- BRW
- Canberra Illustrated: A Quarterly Magazine
- Frankie
- Table Talk (1885–1939)
- The Critic (Adelaide)
- The Gadfly (Adelaide)
- The Home
- The World's Best
- Smith Journal

== Gossip ==
- OK! Magazine (Australia)
- TV Week
- Who

== Health ==
=== Men ===
- Australian Men's Fitness
- Australian Men's Health
- Esquire
- GQ
- Men's Journal

=== Women ===
- Prevention Australia
- Women's Health Australia

=== General ===
- LivingNow

== History ==
- Australian Historical Studies
- Investigator

== Hobby and interest ==
=== Home and garden ===
- Australian House & Garden
- Belle
- Better Homes and Gardens
- Decoration and Glass (defunct)
- Gardening Australia

=== Radio and electronics ===
- Electronics Australia (defunct)
- Electronics Today International (defunct)
- Silicon Chip
- Wireless Weekly (defunct)

== Humour ==
- Adelaide Punch (1878–1884)
- Melbourne Punch (1855–1925)
- Sydney Punch (1864–1888)
- The Cane Toad Times

== Indigenous Australians ==
- Australian Aborigines Advocate (1901–1908)
- Black Australian News (1972)
- Black News Service (1975–1977)
- Churinga (1964–1970), briefly revived as Alchuringa (1971–1972)
- Dawn and New Dawn (1969–1975)
- Identity (1971–1982)
- Irabina (1965–1971)
- Koori Bina (1976–1979)
- Koori Mail (1991–present)
- Land Rights News (1976–present)
- National Indigenous Times (2002–present)
- Smoke Signals (1957–?)
- Westralian Aborigine (1954–1957)

== LGBT ==
- Archer
- Blue
- Curve
- DNA
- Lesbians on the Loose
- OUTinPerth
- QNews
- Queensland Pride
- Star Observer

== Literature and language ==
- aCOMMENT
- Arna (publication)
- Australian Book Review
- Australian Literary Review
- Books+Publishing
- Gangway
- Good Reading
- Grab It Indie Games Magazine
- Griffith Review
- In Touch
- Island Magazine
- The Antipodean
- The Australian Journal
- The Bookfellow
- The Lifted Brow
- Meanjin
- Mekong Review
- Overland
- Quarterly Essay
- Scripsi
- Wet Ink
- Westerly

== Men's interest ==
- Alpha
- Australian Penthouse
- Australian Playboy
- Chance International
- FHM Australia
- Maxim (Australia)
- People
- Ralph
- The Picture
- World (The World: Beautiful and Dangerous)

== Military ==
- Aussie: The Australian Soldiers' Magazine
- Navy News (Australia)

== Miscellaneous ==
- Catalyst

== Motor vehicle ==
- 4WD 24/7
- Car Australia
- Heavy Duty
- Motor
- The Road Ahead
- Wheels
- 4x4

== Music ==
- 3D World (Australia)
- Australian Musician
- Beat Magazine
- Blunt Magazine
- BMA Magazine
- Cyclic Defrost
- Ear for Music
- Fast Forward (1980–1982)
- Go-Set (1966–1974)
- Inpress (1988–2013)
- Juke Magazine (1975–1992)
- Juice
- Limelight
- Music Feeds
- Resident Advisor
- Rip It Up (1989–2016)
- Roadrunner
- Rock Australia Magazine (RAM) (1975–1989)
- Rolling Stone Australia
- Stealth magazine (1999–2007)
- The Alternative Gig Guide
- The Music
- The Music Network
- Time Off
- Triple J Magazine

== News ==
- Avenewz Magazine, Australia
- Business News (Australia)
- Dissent
- Mediaweek (Australia)
- National Observer
- New Internationalist Australia
- News Weekly
- Nexus
- Scoop
- The Bulletin
- The Diplomat
- The Hoopla
- The Illustrated Australian News

== Pet ==
- Pets

== Philosophy ==
- New Philosopher

== Politics ==
- American Review
- Arena
- Australian Left Review
- The Monthly
- The Socialist
- Checkpoint (journal)
- National Observer (Australia)
- Quadrant
- Rolling Stone Australia
- The Socialist

== Religion ==
- Annals Australasia
- Christian Witness Ministries
- Eternity
- Salt
- Signs of the Times
- The Briefing

== Science ==
- Australasian Anthropological Journal
- Australasian Science
- Australian Geographic
- Bulletin of the Australian Carnivorous Plant Society
- Carniflora Australis
- Cosmos
- Science of man and Australasian anthropological journal
- Scientific Australian (1895)
- Victorian Carnivorous Plant Society Inc.

== Science fiction and fantasy ==
- Andromeda Spaceways Inflight Magazine
- Aurealis

== Sports ==
=== General or multiple sports ===
- Inside Sport
- Pop Magazine
- The Australian Golf & Tennis Magazine (1932–1937)

=== Australian rules ===
- AFL Record
- Football Budget
- South Australian Football Budget

=== Basketball ===
- Handle magazine

=== Cricket ===
- ABC Cricket Book

=== Firearms ===
- Australian & New Zealand Handgun
- Australian Shooter

=== Golf ===
- Australian Golf
- Australian Golf Digest
- Australian Golf Instructional
- Golf (1922–1932)
- Golf Magazine
- Golf News
- Inside Golf
- Ladies Golf Magazine
- PGA Magazine (1999-2011?)
- Women's Golf (2006–2012)

=== Hunting ===
- Australian Hunter
- Wild Boar Australia Magazine
- Wild Deer and Hunting Adventures

=== Martial Arts ===
- Fightmag

=== Motor vehicle ===
- Australian 4WD Action
- Auto Action

=== Rugby league ===
- Big League
- Rugby League Review
- Rugby League Week (defunct)

=== Sailing ===
- Australian Sailing
- Club Marine
- Ocean Magazine

=== Soccer ===
- FourFourTwo
- Soccer International

=== Surfing ===
- Australia's Surfing Life
- Pacific Longboarder
- Surfing World Magazine
- Tracks

=== Tennis ===
- Australian Tennis Magazine

== Teen interest ==
- Dolly (defunct)
- Girlfriend
- The Helix

== Transport ==
- Australian Aviation
- Australian Bus
- Australian Bus Panorama
- Australian Railway History
- Australasian Bus & Coach
- Australasian Transport News
- Catch Point
- Fleetline (defunct)
- Freight & Container Transportation (defunct)
- Green over Red (defunct)
- Light Railways
- Motive Power
- Narrow Gauge Down Under
- Network (defunct)
- Newsrail
- Railway Digest
- Railway Transportation (defunct)
- Rattler
- Roundhouse
- Sunshine Express
- Tasmanian Rail News
- The Recorder (defunct)
- The Westland (periodical)
- Track & Signal
- Transit Australia
- Truck & Bus Transportation (defunct)

== Travel ==
- Australian Traveller
- Get Lost Magazine
- Holidays with Kids
- International Traveller
- Qantas: The Australian Way
- Road Ahead
- RoyalAuto
- The Open Road
- Walkabout (defunct)

== Underground/alternative ==
- Is Not Magazine
- Oz (defunct)

== Video game ==
- Atomic
- Australian GamePro (defunct)
- Australian Realms
- Grab It Indie Games Magazine
- Hyper
- Mega Zone
- Nintendo Magazine System (defunct)
- PC PowerPlay
- PlayStation Official Magazine – Australia

== Wildlife and Sustainability ==
- Australian Birdlife
- ECOS
- G Magazine (Australia)
- Landscope
- New Internationalist Australia
- Organic Farming Digest
- ReNew
- The State of Australia's Birds
- Wild Life
- Wingspan

== Women's magazines ==
- Australian Woman's Mirror (1924–1961)
- Bride to Be
- Cosmopolitan Australia
- Cleo (defunct)
- Elle Australia
- Hepburn
- Marie Claire Australia
- New Idea
- New Weekly
- POL Magazine (defunct)
- Take 5
- That's Life!
- The Australian Women's Weekly
- The Dawn
- WFO
- Woman (defunct)
- Womankind
- Woman's Day

=== Fashion ===
- Fashion Quarterly Australia (defunct)
- Grazia Australia (defunct)
- Harper's Bazaar Australia/New Zealand
- InStyle Australia
- L'Officiel Australia (defunct)
- Russh
- T The New York Times Style Magazine Australia
- Vogue Australia

== See also ==
- List of newspapers in Australia
- Media of Australia
