= Scoop =

Scoop, Scoops or The Scoop may refer to:

== Artefacts ==
- Scoop (machine part), a component of machinery to carry things
- Scoop (tool), a shovel-like tool, particularly one deep and curved, used in digging
- Scoop (theater), a type of wide area lighting fixture
- Scoop (utensil), a specialized spoon for serving
- Scoop neckline, a kind of shirt neckline
- Scoop stretcher, a device used for casualty lifting
- Hood scoop, a ventilating opening in the bonnet (hood) of a car

== People and characters ==
- Scoop (nickname), a list of people nicknamed "Scoop" or "Scoops"
- Fatman Scoop (1968–2024), American rapper

=== Fictional characters ===
- Scoop, a backhoe loader character in Bob the Builder
- Scoop, a toy bulldozer in Scoop and Doozie
- Scoop (G.I. Joe), a character in the G.I. Joe universe
- Scoop Smith, a character in Fawcett Comics' Whiz Comics
- Todd "Scoops" Ming, a character on WordGirl

== Places ==
- The Scoop, an amphitheatre in London, England, UK
- Scoop Lake, Idaho, US

== Groups, organizations ==
- Scoop (dance project), a Belgian dance project by Jan Vervloet

== Arts and entertainment ==
=== Film ===
- Scoop, a Malaysian film by Aziz M. Osman
- Scoop!, a 2016 Japanese comedy
- Scoop (1987 film), based on Evelyn Waugh's satirical novel
- Scoop (2006 film), a romantic crime comedy by Woody Allen
- The Scoop (film), a 1934 British crime film
- Scoop (2024 film), a Netflix biographical film

=== Music and dance ===
- "Scoop", a song by Lil Nas X from Montero (2021)
- Scoop (album), a 1983 album by Pete Townshend
- Scoop (music), a type of glissando performed by wind instruments

=== Publications ===
- Scoop (news), a news story, normally an exclusive for a journalist
- Scoop (novel), a 1938 satirical novel by Evelyn Waugh
- Scoop (website), a news website based in New Zealand
- Scoop (journalism magazine), a quarterly publication by the Australian Journalists Association
- Scoops (magazine), a 1934 UK science fiction magazine

=== Television ===
- Scoop (British TV series), a children's series on CBBC
- Scoop (Indian TV series), a 2023 Netflix courtroom drama series

=== Video games ===
- The Scoop (video game), a 1986 video game for the Apple II
- Scoops (video game), an iOS game developed by NimbleBit

== Sport ==
- Scoop, a professional wrestling hold
- Scoop (cricket), a modern shot in cricket which involves reversing the grip on the bat

== Computing and electronics ==
- LG Scoop, a phone
- SCOOP (software), the 'Simple Concurrent Object-Oriented Programming' extension for concurrent programming in the Eiffel programming language
- Scoop Package Manager, a command-line installer for Windows

== Other uses ==
- Sixties Scoop, aka The Scoop, Canadian government policy of removing Indigenous children from their families
- Operation Primicia or Operation Scoop, a guerrilla attack on October 5, 1975, in Formosa, Argentina

== See also ==
- Scooper (disambiguation)
