= Football Budget =

Football Budget may refer to one of two separate Australian rules football match-day programmes:

- The South Australian Football Budget, official programme of the South Australian National Football League
- The Football Budget (Western Australia), official programme of the West Australian Football League
