= Enoteca Boccaccio =

Restaurant in Melbourne, Australia

Coordinates: 37°48′4.3″S 145°03′45.2″E

- Interactive map of Enoteca Boccaccio
- Address: Level 1, 1046 Burke Road, Balwyn; Melbourne; Australia

Construction
- Opened: 2023

Website
- www.enoteca.boccaccio.com.au

Enoteca Boccaccio is an Italian restaurant and wine bar based in Melbourne, Australia.

== Description ==
The interior of the venue has dark timber walls, cabernet-coloured drapes, clay-tiled floors, and a white marble bar. It is reached by a flight of stairs beside the Boccaccio grocer, with an upper floor operating as a 50-seat venue. It has been described as reminiscent of Italy's streets and piazzas. The restaurant's design won the 2023 Belle Fanuli Interior Design Award for "Best Hospitality Interior" from Belle design magazine.

Dishes praised by reviewers include its green olives stuffed with mortadella, and slow-cooked onions and duck hearts.

== History ==
Enoteca was started by the D'Anna family, who are also known for operating the bottle shop and grocer Boccaccio cellars.

== Reception ==
In her review for the Herald Sun, Kara Monssen scored Enoteca 15/20, writing:

"Crazy delicious eating and drinking will only get you so far. How wonderfully refreshing it is for new operator Enoteca Boccaccio to deeply understand and honour what it means to be hospitable in all that it does."

Emma Breheny in a review for The Age also moderately praised the restaurant, but did not provide a score.
