= Scooper =

Scooper may refer to:

== Devices ==
- Canadair CL-215 Scooper, a radial-engined amphibious flying-boat scooping waterbomber firefighting airplane
- Excavator, heavy construction equipment also known as a scooper
- Scooper or pooper-scooper, a device used to pick up dog droppings
- Scooper or scoop (utensil) (such as an ice cream scoop), a device used to scoop substances, usually in spherical output
- Scooper or scoop (tool), a shovel-like tool used to scoop up or scoop out material

=== Fictional devices ===
- Scooper (Japanese: スクーパー, romanized: Sukūpā), a fictional device from the 1982 Japanese tokusatsu TV show Space Sheriff Gavan

== People and characters ==
- Scooper, a journalist with a scoop (news)

=== Fictional characters ===
- Scooper Sam, the school mascot for Sturgis Williams Middle School, Meade School District, Sturgis, South Dakota, USA
- Scooper, a fictional character from the 1944 U.S. film Janie (1944 film)
- Scooper, a fictional character from the 1946 U.S. film Janie Gets Married
- Scooper, a fictional character from the 1971 UK TV show Here Come the Double Deckers!
- Scooper, a fictional character from the 1979 U.S. stageplay Bosoms and Neglect
- Scooper, a fictional character from the 2002 animated U.S. film Snow Dogs
- Freddy Scooper, a character from the 1992 U.S. animated TV show Raw Toonage

== Groups, organizations ==
- SCOOPERS, a Japanese idol girl group
- The Scoopers, the sports teams of Sturgis Brown High School, Meade School District, Sturgis, South Dakota, USA
- Scooper (company), a subsidiary of Chinese mobile phone maker Transsion

== Arts, entertainment, media ==
- Scoopers (Japanese: スクーパーズ, romanized: Sukupazu, also stylized as SCOOPERS), a 1987 Japanese anime film; see List of animated feature films of 1987
- Scooper (comic), a comic strip run in the UK comics anthology magazine Jackpot (British comics)

== Other uses ==
- Scooper Bowl, an annual Boston ice cream festival run by The Jimmy Fund

== See also ==
- Bombardier CL-415 Superscooper, a turboprop amphibious flying-boat scooping waterbomber firefighting airplane
- Super Scooper (print), a 2014 artwork by Peter Smith (painter)
- Super Scooper (sculpture), a 2014 sculpture by Peter Smith (painter)
- King Scoopers, a U.S. grocery store chain
- Scoop (disambiguation)
