= Australian Dairy Foods =

Australian Magazine

- Company type: Trade magazine
- Industry: Media
- Founded: 1942
- Founder: Australian Institute of Dairy Factory Managers and Secretaries
- Headquarters: West Melbourne, Victoria
- Area served: Australia
- Key people: Editor: Irina Fainberg
- Services: News and information for the post-farmgate dairy sector in Australia
- Owner: Dairy Industry Association of Australia
- Website: Dairy Industry Association of Australia

Australian Dairy Foods is a trade magazine for the dairy industry in Australia. It is published bi-monthly by the Dairy Industry Association of Australia.

== History and profile ==
The magazine was first published in 1942 under the name Butter Fat & Solids by the Australian Institute of Dairy Factory Managers and Secretaries. In 1979, it was expanded and renamed Australian Dairy Foods.

The magazine covers a range of topics - news, company profiles, equipment, research, industry insights, and more.

The magazine also features the results of DIAA's National and State dairy product competitions. Innovators from all sectors of the industry are regularly profiled.

In 2008 Australian Dairy Foods was recognised for the quality of its news coverage at the "2008 Tabbies", an international business-to-business competition run by the US-based "Trade, Association and Business Publications International".

== See also ==
- List of magazines in Australia
- List of food and drink magazines
