= Heather Catchpole =

Australian science communicator

Heather Catchpole is an Australian science journalist, editor and science communicator. She was the co-founder of Refraction Media.

== Career ==
Catchpole began her career in science publishing, working as an editor of ''Scientriffic'', a children's science magazine published by the Commonwealth Scientific and Industrial Research Organisation (CSIRO), from 2000 to 2003.

From 2003 to 2007, Catchpole worked at the Australian Broadcasting Corporation (ABC), initially as a journalist and subsequently as an associate producer for ABC Science. Her work included science and health news, as well as digital, radio, video, podcast and interactive content. She has also published science articles in The Canberra Times and The Age newspapers.

Catchpole joined ''Cosmos'' magazine in 2011 as deputy editor and became managing editor in 2012.

In 2013, Catchpole co-founded Refraction Media, a science, research and education publishing company. She left the company in 2024. The company's publications include Careers with STEM, which provides information about science, technology, engineering and mathematics careers for students, educators and parents. This magazine is sent in print to schools across Australia. Catchpole was also the editor on Australian University Science magazine, Know How and Science Meets Business.

In 2024, Catchpole joined Questacon – The National Science and Technology Centre, leading a team of regional leaders involved in Questacon's educator programs.

== Awards ==
Australia's Best Small Publisher, Mumbrella Publish Awards, 2015

== Selected publications ==
=== Books ===
- Catchpole, Heather and O'Brien, Nicola (2020). Ready, Set, Code! [CSIRO Publishing]. ISBN 9781486312368.
- Catchpole, Heather, ed. 2017. Oceans: Teacher Resource. Clayton South, VIC: CSIRO Publishing
- Catchpole, Heather, Vanessa Woods, and Mic Looby. 2008. Pirates Ate Rats. Crows Nest, N.S.W., London: Allen & Unwin ; Frances Lincoln [distributor].
- Catchpole, Heather, Vanessa Woods, and Heath McKenzie. 2006. Space Turns You into Spaghetti. Crows Nest, N.S.W.: Allen & Unwin.
- Catchpole, Heather, Craig Smith, and Vanessa Woods. 2006. There Are Bugs in Your Bed. Toronto, Richmond Hill, ON: Annick Press; Distributed by Firefly Books.
- Catchpole, Heather, and David McClenaghan. 2004. The Yummy Book of Rocks. Dickson, A.C.T.: CSIRO Education.

=== Articles ===
- Catchpole, Heather. 2018. “Addressing Digital Disruption in Skills and Career Pathways: The Careers with STEM Platform.” Access 32 (2): 28–33.
- Black, G & Catchpole, H 2013, ‘Potential Energy’, Teaching Science: The Journal of the Australian Science Teachers Association
- Catchpole, Heather (2010) 'Sea level changes feel heat from below', ABC Science [Australian Broadcasting Corporation].
