= Macworld =

Website, digital magazine and podcast dedicated to Apple products

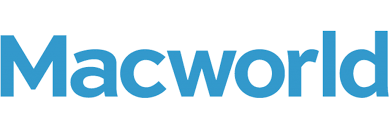

- April 2004 issue
- Executive Editor: Michael Simon
- Managing Editor: Karen Haslam
- Senior Editor: Roman Loyola
- Senior Editor: Jason Cross
- Editor: David Price
- Categories: Computing / Mac
- Frequency: Continuous
- First issue: February 1984; 42 years ago
- Company: Foundry
- Country: List: United States (0741-8647); United Kingdom (1356-9503); Germany; Sweden
- Website: www.macworld.com
- ISSN: 0741-8647
- OCLC: 607262846

Macworld is a digital magazine and website dedicated to products and software of Apple Inc., published by Foundry. Founded in 1984 by International Data Corporation (IDG) alongside the launch of the Macintosh computer, it became one of the most widely read Macintosh-focused magazines and was closely associated with the Macworld Conference & Expo.

Originally published as a print magazine, Macworld transitioned to a digital-only publication in 2014 and is currently published by Foundry (formerly known as IDG Communications), which was acquired by Regent in 2025.

== History ==
Macworld was founded in 1984 by publishers David Bunnell and Cheryl Woodard (who co-founded PC World) and editor Andrew Fluegelman. Apple marketing executive Mike Murray reportedly supported the launch with funding and promotional assistance. The first issue was distributed at the public launch of the Macintosh on 24 January 1984. A trial subscription card to the magazine was included in Macintosh manuals for the first 600,000 owners, helping establish the publication's readership among the first generation of Macintosh users.

=== Growth of the magazine ===
During the 1980s and 1990s, Macworld became one of the largest Macintosh-focused publications in North America, with a peak circulation in the 1990s that was more than double its nearest competitor, MacLife. The magazine covered Apple hardware and software, desktop publishing, business computing, and emerging Macintosh technologies.

In 1997, the U.S. edition of MacUser magazine was merged into Macworld through Mac Publishing, a joint venture between International Data Group (IDG) and Ziff-Davis.

In 1996, Macworld expanded to the web as Macworld.com.

In 1999, Mac Publishing acquired MacCentral Online, strengthening its online news operation.

In 2001, IDG acquired Ziff-Davis's stake in Mac Publishing, making it a wholly owned subsidiary.

In 2003, Macworld launched a digital edition while continuing the print publication.

In September 2014, IDG announced the end of the U.S. print edition of Macworld. The publication subsequently continued as a digital-only brand.

Following its transition away from print, Macworld operates primarily through its website, newsletters, podcasts, and digital publishing channels.

== Podcasts ==
The Macworld Podcast is published weekly on YouTube, Apple Podcasts and Spotify and hosted by the Macworld editorial team, primarily featuring Michael Simon, Jason Cross, and Roman Loyola. Podcast episodes cover breaking Apple news, product announcements, hardware and software reviews, in-depth discussions on rumors, and Apple history.

The first was broadcast in April, 2005 as the "Geek Factor Podcast." It was upgraded into the official Macworld Podcast with its fifth installment, in August 2005. The Podcast’s original host was Cyrus Farivar.

== International editions ==
Macworld magazine has been published in many countries, either by other IDG subsidiaries or by outside publishers who licensed the brand name and its content. These editions included Macworld Australia, Germany (Macwelt), Italy, Spain, Sweden (MacWorld), Turkey, the U.K., the Netherlands and Indonesia.

=== United Kingdom ===
The British edition of Macworld was first published in 1985. The Macworld U.K. website – macworld.co.uk – launched in 1995.

Macworld U.K. combined syndicated content from the international Macworld network with locally produced editorial coverage focused on the British Apple market, including pricing and retail availability.

The Macworld U.K. Awards were an annual award ceremony hosted by the UK-based Macworld magazine to honor outstanding hardware, software, accessories, and developers within the Apple and Macintosh ecosystem. The awards were presented annually between 2001 and 2013 and were presented at annual ceremonies held in London hosted by figures including Stephen Fry and Richard E. Grant.

The final U.K. print edition was published in 2015. A U.K. digital edition, with localised pricing and availability, continues to be produced.

macworld.co.uk continued until April 2022 when the U.K. and U.S. teams merged their digital operations, consolidating the teams and migrating content to Macworld.com. While unified, the site continues to serve relevant regional content (such as pricing, availability, and specific deals) for English-speaking readers globally, utilizing subdirectories like Macworld UK.

=== Germany (Macwelt) ===
Macwelt is the German-language edition of Macworld. [

The print magazine was launched in 1990. The website launched in October 1997.

Although the print edition ceased publication in 2015, Macwelt continues as a website and digital publication Macwelt Special.

=== Sweden (Macworld Sweden) ===
Macworld Sweden is the Swedish edition of the Macworld brand. The publication was launched in January 1998 as part of IDG's expansion of Macintosh-focused media across Europe and was published by IDG Sweden.

The print publication closed in 2014.

The MacWorld Sweden website continues to publish Apple-related news, reviews, analysis, and buying advice.

== Macworld Conference & Expo ==
The success of the publication led the publisher to license the Macworld name to another IDG subsidiary, IDG World Expo, for the creation of the Macworld Conference & Expo, commonly known as Macworld Expo and later as Macworld/iWorld. The first event was held in San Francisco in 1985.

IDG's exhibitions division ran U.S. Macworld Expos in San Francisco every year from 1985 to 2015. A summer event was also held, either in Boston (1985-1997 and 2004-2005) or in New York (1998–2003). It also ran a Macworld Expo in Tokyo.

The Macworld Expo became a significant gathering for Apple users, developers, hardware manufacturers, software companies, and industry professionals.

Following Steve Jobs’ return to Apple in 1997, Macworld Expo became known for high-profile keynote presentations, known informally as "Stevenotes". Major product announcements included: the original iPhone in 2007, the first MacBook Air in 2008, the public debut of Mac OS X in 2000, and the first Mac mini in 2005.

Steve Jobs last Macworld San Francisco keynote was in 2008. In 2009, Jobs did not deliver the Macworld keynote due to medical leave. Phil Schiller presented the keynote, marking Apple's final appearance at Macworld Expo.

== Ownership and management ==
Macworld first published by International Data Group (IDG) in 1984. From 1997 to 2001, Macworld was published by Mac Publishing, a joint venture between International Data Group and Ziff-Davis. IDG bought out Ziff-Davis's share of Mac Publishing in 2001. Mac Publishing was then absorbed into the IDG media arm, IDG Communications, which operates media brands like Computerworld, CIO, PCWorld, InfoWorld, Network World, and TechAdvisor.

In 2022, IDG Communications rebranded its global technology publishing business as Foundry. In March 2025, Foundry was acquired by the private-equity firm Regent LP as part of a broader transaction involving all of IDG's media properties. The acquisition combined Foundry's technology publications with TechCrunch under Regent ownership.

== Legacy ==
Macworld was among the earliest publications devoted exclusively to the Macintosh platform. Founded alongside the launch of the Macintosh in 1984, it grew to become the largest Macintosh-focused publication in North America by circulation during the 1990s.

The publication was closely associated with Macworld Expo, which became a major gathering for Apple users, developers, and technology companies and served as the venue for numerous Apple product announcements.

=== Notable editors and contributors ===
Notable editors and contributors associated with Macworld have included founding editor Andrew Fluegelman, former editor-in-chief Jason Snell, journalists Chris Breen and Dan Frakes, and technology writers Steven Levy and David Pogue.
