= Chris Stead =

Australian video games journalist

- Born: 6 April 1979 (age 47); Sydney
- Other name: The Captain
- Occupation: Video games journalist
- Known for: Game Informer; GamePro; Grab It Indie Games Magazine; Old Mate Media

Chris Stead (born 6 April 1979) is an Australian video games journalist, editor and publisher. He is best known for founding the Australian editions of Game Informer and GamePro magazines and their websites. In 2013 he won the inaugural MCV Pacific Journalist of the Year award. In 2014, he launched Grab It Indie Games Magazine. In 2015 he launched the print and digital book publishing company Old Mate Media.

== Early life ==
Stead was born in Sydney, Australia and is the oldest of five children. He studied Molecular Biology and Genetics at Sydney University, graduating in 2000.

== Career ==
=== Early career ===
Stead's first published work appeared in N64 Gamer magazine in 1997. During this time he also contributed to Hyper, PC PowerPlay and GameSpot, amongst others. In 2000, he signed with ACP Magazines as Staff Writer for the launch of Official PlayStation Magazine.

=== GamePro ===
In 2003 Stead signed on with IDG to launch the Australian edition of GamePro magazine as senior staff writer, with veteran editor Stuart Clarke. Stead later become deputy editor, and then editor prior to his departure in 2007.

=== Gameplayer ===
Soon after departing IDG, Stead signed on with Derwent Howard to launch a new gaming website called Gameplayer as editor-in-chief. After two years, he left the site to contribute to IGN, Official PlayStation Magazine and the Australian version of Official Xbox Magazine.

=== Game Informer ===
In 2009, Chris Stead re-signed with Derwent Howard to launch an Australian edition of Game Informer magazine. The magazine picked up the 2011 and 2012 Australian Magazine Award for the Computing & Games category, and the 2013 MCV Pacific Award for Print Publication of the Year. In January 2014, Stead left after completing the 51st issue.

=== Grab It Indie Games Magazine ===
In February 2014, Stead released the first issue of Grab It Indie Games Magazine. In October 2014, Grab It was a finalist in the Digital Magazine Awards 2014, ultimately receiving a highly commended accolade. Eight episodes of the magazine were released, as well as standalone episode based around the game Nihilumbra. The eighth and final episode of Grab It Magazine is notable for also doubling as the indie guide to PAX AUS 2014.

Ahead of the launch of issue 1, Stead spoke with MCV about his motivations behind leaving Game Informer to launch Grab It Indie Games Magazine, noting that "it's difficult to talk about indie games in a commercial media outlet in any meaningful way.

=== Old Mate Media ===
In January 2015, Stead began publishing fiction and non-fiction print and digital books under his company name, Old Mate Media. As well as publishing books authored by Stead, the Old Mate Media label provides editing, design and publishing services to independent authors.

=== Finder ===
Since February 2015, Stead has been active as an editor for Australian comparison site Finder. In 2016, Stead was nominated for Best Gaming Journalist at "The Lizzies" (IT Journalism Awards).

== Books written by Chris Stead ==
The books written by Chris Stead have been published through Amazon and many other online stores.

- The Little Green Boat (Book 1 The Wild Imagination of Willy Nilly Series) -2015
- Follow the Breadcrumbs (Book 2 The Wild Imagination of Willy Nilly Series) - 2016
- My Birthday Cake Needs a New Home - 2016
- Fastest Kid in the World (Book 3 The Wild Imagination of Willy Nilly Series) - 2016
- A Very Strange Zoo - 2016
- Can You See the Magic - 2016
- Nintendo Switch - The Complete Insider's Guide - 2017
- Adam Exitus (Book 1 Adam X series) - 2017 (written with Nick Adbilla)
- The Making of Monument Valley - 2017
- What is Cryptocurrency: Your Complete Guide to Bitcoin, Blockchain and Beyond - 2018
- Christmas Chimney Challenge (Book 4 The Wild Imagination of Willy Nilly Series) - 2018
- Let the Sad Thoughts Out - 2020
- Ultimate at Home Activities Guide for Kids - 2020
- Adam Exiled (Book 2 Adam X series) - 2020 (written with Nick Adbilla)
- Nintendo Switch Gaming Guide - 2020
- Gentle George - 2020 (written with Ken MacKenzie)
- Sony PS5 Gaming Guide - 2020
- Adam Nexus (Book 3 Adam X series) - 2020 (written with Nick Adbilla)
