= Australasian Anthropological Journal =

Australian anthropology magazine

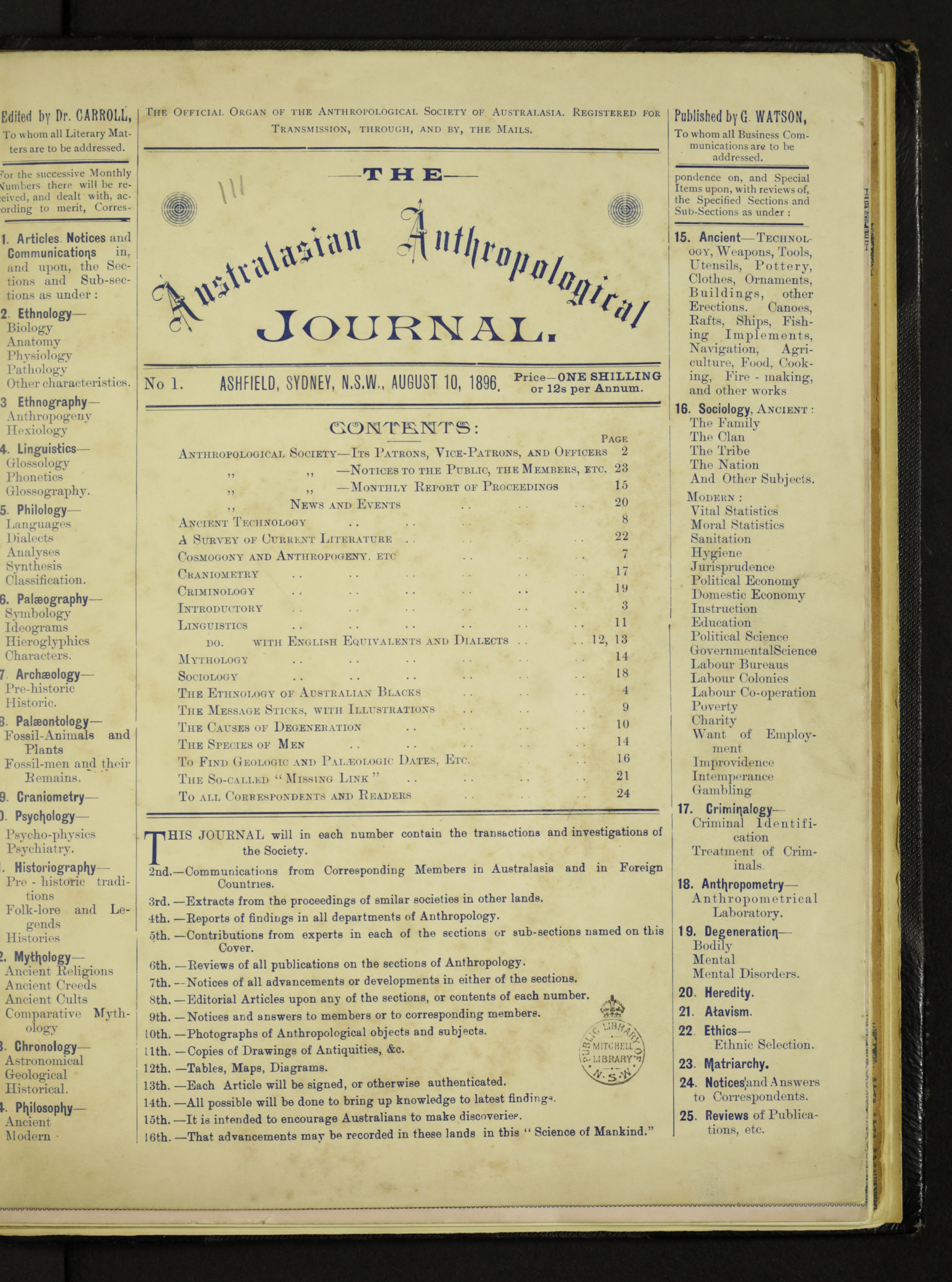
Australasian Anthropological Journal

The Australasian Anthropological Journal was a magazine issued from August 1896 to May 1897, after which time it was issued as the Science of man and Australasian anthropological journal, eventually shortened to the Science of Man until it ceased publication in 1913.

== History ==
The Australasian Anthropological Journal was, according to the banner of the first issue, "The Official Organ of the Australian Anthropological Society". The journal's editor and driving force was Allan Carroll (1823–1911), who was also the founder of the society. Selling for one shilling per issue, and consisting of much irreverent advertising material, the journal was not academic in nature but was rather a popular edition, directed towards interested members of the general public. Many of the articles featured in the journal were unattributed, came without footnotes, and were likely authored by Carroll himself.

The journal, in its various guises, played a significant role in the development of the Anthropology in Australia, however, the journal has also been derided for the amateur approach of Carroll, for its focus on racial stereotypes and the assumption that Aboriginal Australians were of a dying race.

== Digitisation ==
The Australasian Anthropological Journal has been digitised by the National Library of Australia. The Science of man and journal of the Royal Anthropological Society of Australasia has been digitised by the National Library of Australia.

== See also ==
- List of magazines in Australia
