= Mic Looby =

Australian author and illustrator

Mic Looby (born 1969) is an Australian author and illustrator.

A former guidebook writer for Lonely Planet, his debut novel Paradise Updated – a satire about the inner workings of a guidebook company – was published in 2009 by Affirm Press. Looby is also a columnist with the Australian chapter of The Big Issue magazine and has illustrated three titles in the It's True! series of children's non-fiction books published by Allen & Unwin.

== Bibliography ==
- Mic Looby (2018). Black Snake. Australia: Affirm Press. ISBN 978-1-9255849-5-0.
- Mic Looby (2009). Paradise Updated. Australia: Affirm Press. ISBN 978-0-9803746-6-7.
- Catchpole, Heather; Woods, Vanessa (2007). It's True! Pirates Ate Rats. Australia: Allen & Unwin. ISBN 978-1-74114-607-3.
- Rick Wilkinson (2004). It's True! Animals Are Electrifying. Australia: Allen & Unwin. ISBN 978-1-74114-343-0.
- It's True! Frogs Are Cannibals. Australia: Allen & Unwin. 2003. ISBN 1-74114-271-7.
