= Decoration and Glass =

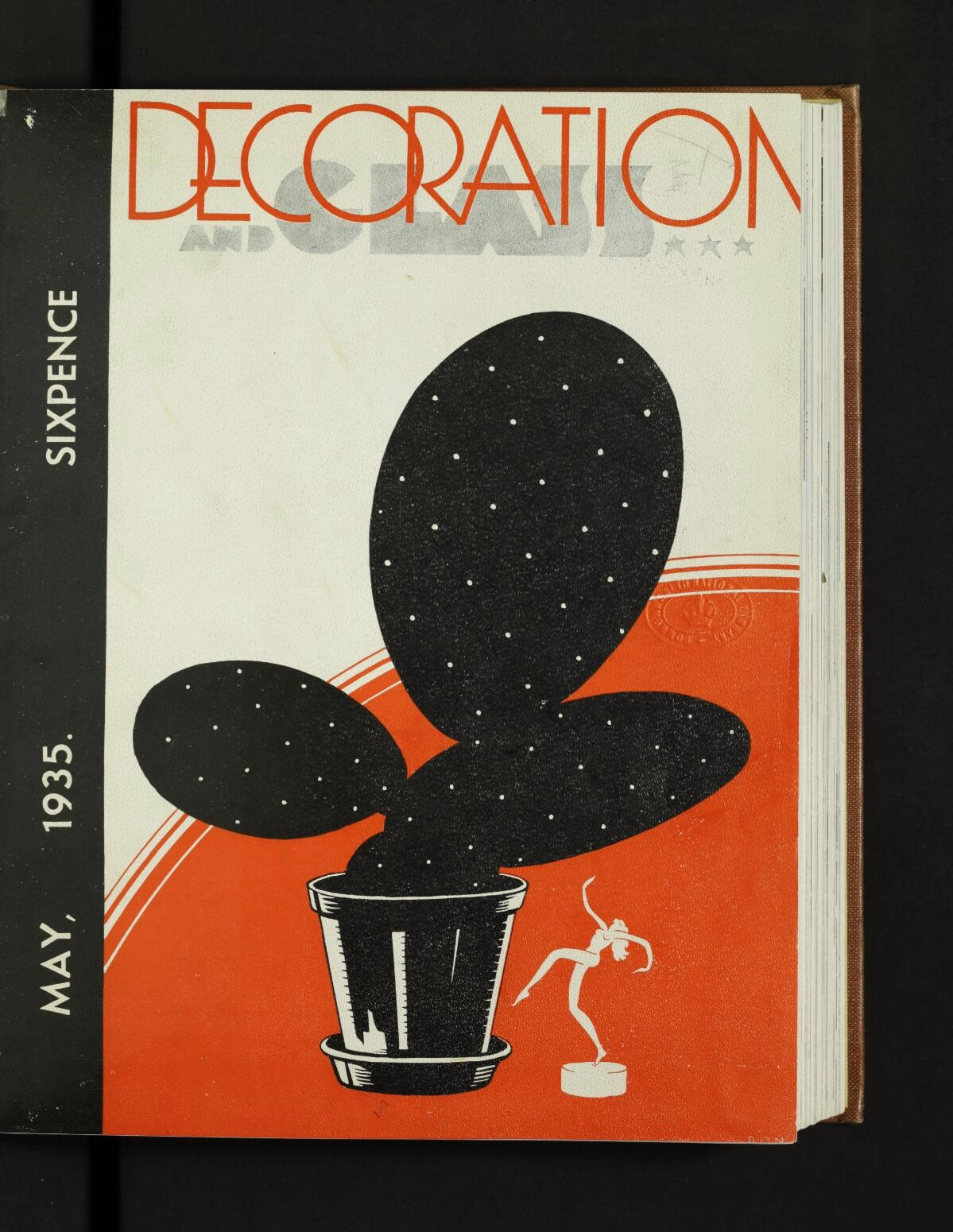
Cover of the first issue of Decoration and Glass, May 1934

Decoration and Glass, was an English-language trade journal, issued from 1935 to 1949, and published in Sydney, New South Wales, Australia.

== History ==
Decoration and Glass : journal for home builders, architects and decorators was the official journal of the Australian Glass Manufacturers Company. While the earliest edition of Decoration and Glass was issued May 1935, the journal was published simply as Glass'between 1934 and 1935. The earliest editors of the journal were Walter Glover, as managing editor and publisher, and Don Angus, as art director. Angus later established himself as a commercial artist in his own right, operating out of a studio in Hunter Street Sydney, and later became the vice-president of the Australian Commercial and Industrial Artists Association in Victoria. While Glover, was the same Walter Frederick Glover, who went on to some degree of infamy as the champion of the art of Rosaleen Norton, and the publisher of a book of her art, resulting in his being charged by police with the production of an obscene publication.

Appearing directly after the height of the Great Depression in Australia, the journal's focus on colourful interior decoration, decorative and ornamental architecture and glass work was considered progressive for its time. In addition to reflecting the styles and fashions of the period, the journal also reflected the increasing individual wealth and home ownership of the time, as Australia's economy slowly recovered.

== See also ==
- List of magazines in Australia
