= Inside Golf =

- Chief Editor: Richard Fellner
- Categories: Golf Magazines
- Frequency: Monthly
- Format: Short Tabloid
- Circulation: 42,614 Monthly (CAB)
- Publisher: Outdoor Sports Publishing
- Founded: August 2005
- Country: Australia
- Based in: Robina; Gold Coast QLD; Australia
- Language: English
- Website: Inside Golf

Inside Golf is an Australian-based golf publication covering golf news, stories, events and features for golf across Australia. Distributed free in pro shops, social clubs and retail outlets across Australia, the publication is Australia's highest-circulating (CAB Audited) golf publication, with a circulation of 42,614 copies per month.

== History and profile ==
Inside Golf was established in 2005. The magazine is published by Outdoor Sports Publishing, a Gold Coast (Queensland) based publisher that also publishes Inside Golf Travel.

In 2010, 2011, 2012, 2013 and 2014, independent surveys by Golf Research Australia and Sports Marketing Surveys concluded that Inside Golf is the most regularly read monthly golf publication in Australia, placing it above all other golf newsstand and subscription publications in the country.

Inside Golf website was started in 2006. The magazine is also available in digital form on iPads and iPhones

== Team ==
Publisher: Sam Arthur
Editor: Rob Willis
Writers: Peter Owen, David Newbery

== Location ==
Main Office: Gold Coast, Queensland.

== See also ==
- List of magazines in Australia
