= Phillips Ormonde Fitzpatrick =

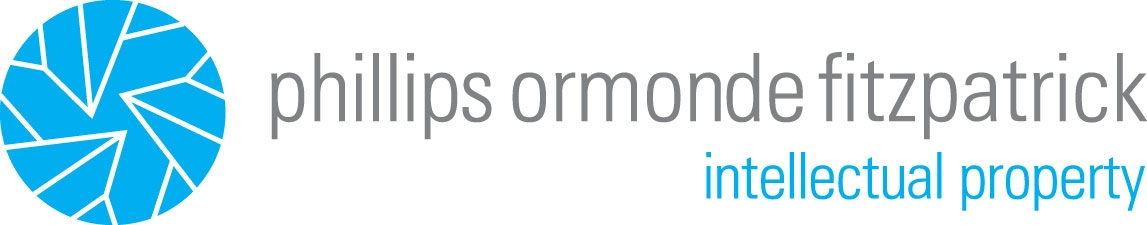
- Type: Partnership
- Industry: Intellectual Property
- Founded: 1888
- Headquarters: 3 offices in Australia
- Key people: Andrew Massie (Managing Partner) Chris Schlict (Board Chair)
- Number of employees: Approx. 140
- Website: www.pof.com.au

Phillips Ormonde Fitzpatrick (POF) is an Australian Intellectual Property firm. Phillips Ormonde Fitzpatrick has around 140 employees across offices in Melbourne, Sydney and Adelaide. It also operates directly in New Zealand and Papua New Guinea. In 2013, the firm celebrated its 125th anniversary. Phillips Ormonde Fitzpatrick publishes a quarterly newsletter on IP, case studies, firm news and legal updates called 'Inspire'.

== History ==
In 1888, William D. Rowlingson commenced practice as a registered Patent Agent in the then British colony of Victoria. This practice was operated from Melbourne, but encompassed the six original colonies (now Australian States) with their separate legislation for the protection of inventions, trade marks, designs and copyrights. In 1889 Albert Swanston, who had practiced independently as a registered Patent Agent, joined Rowlingson and they remained in partnership as Swanson & Rowlingson until 1892. Edwin Phillips then acquired the practice and renamed the business Phillips, Ormonde & Co.

Edwin Phillips, who had emigrated from England for health reasons, had a broad ranging interest in engineering. Phillips wrote and published a comprehensive handbook for inventors entitled The Inventor’s Aid, and a periodical The Scientific Australian. Upon his arrival in Australia from England in 1881, Edwin Phillips took up employment with the fledgling Australian Electric Light Company. He installed lighting plants at mines on behalf of that company, in Victoria and in the colony of Queensland. In 1885, he entered into the partnership of Phillips & Jacques, an engineering firm operating from Richmond, Victoria. Phillips was a director of several prominent Victorian companies and these outside directorships, engineering interests and other investments provided him with ample resources to pursue his interest in intellectual property law and to establish Phillips, Ormonde & Co.

Federation of the Australian colonies had been proposed in the 1850s. However, it was not until after the Intercolonial Convention in December, 1883 that a Bill to establish the Federal Council of Australasia was drafted. The Bill was sufficiently broad-ranging to foreshadow the Council having authority over patents of invention and discovery and copyright. After Federation in 1901, the drafting of legislation to give effect to that authority became necessary. The first Australian Patents Act came into effect in 1903, the Trade Marks Act 1905 and the Designs Act 1906. As a Patent Agent registered under the prior colonial legislation, Edwin Phillips was able to continue his practice following Federation and, in 1904, he was registered as a Patent Attorney under the Patents Act 1903. He continued his practice under the new Federal legislation until 1921, and died in 1923 at the age of 64.

After joining Phillips, Ormonde & Co., Cecil Woods LePlastrier was registered as a Patent Attorney in 1905. LePlastrier, one of the first to qualify for registration as a Patent Attorney under the official examination established pursuant to that Act, subsequently joined Phillips in partnership. Victor Kelson joined the firm around 1907 and was registered as a Patent Attorney in 1920. At that stage, Kelson was admitted to partnership and the firm name was changed to Phillips Ormonde LePlastrier & Kelson.

Cecil LePlastrier was the senior partner of Phillips Ormonde LePlastrier & Kelson until his death in 1952. Under the guidance of Cecil LePlastrier, the partnership expanded in 1938 to include both Geoffrey Sly, who was senior partner from 1952 until his death in 1964 and Bertram C. Fitzpatrick, (originally engaged by Edwin Phillips himself in 1919) who was senior partner from 1964 until his retirement in 1972. Under B. C. Fitzpatrick, the firm’s name was changed to Phillips Ormonde & Fitzpatrick in 1967.

Over the past 20 years the firm has expanded rapidly to its present size with more than 25 partners and more than 140 total staff.

== Services ==
POF offers a comprehensive range of intellectual property services including:

- Patents
- Trade Marks
- Designs
- Intellectual Property law/Legal services
- Research and investigation services
- Portfolio management
