= Cristy Burne =

Australian writer

Cristy Burne is a West Australian writer known for her children's books. She is also a science communicator and a journalist. She has lived and worked all over the world.

== Career ==
Burne is a trained scientist who has worked for more than 20 at CERN, Questacon and CSIRO as Editor of Scientriffic. She worked in Australia, Japan, Switzerland, the UK, US, South Africa and elsewhere. She has written more than 18 children books.

Burne's sister, Heather Waugh, is also a children's book writer. Both were finalists for the Western Australian Premier's Book Awards in 2026.

Her latest book, One Day Soon, published in 2026, draw's on her family's experience with motor neurone disease.

== Public appearances ==
Burne is a regular presenter at writers festivals, including the Sydney Writers Festival (2023–24) and Brisbane Writers Festival. She makes regular speaking appearances at schools across Australia.

== Recognition ==
- 2025 Shortlisted Speech Pathology Book of the Year Awards (Into the Blue)
- 2022 Winner West Australia Young Readers Book Award (Off The Track)
- 2022 Shortlisted WA Premier's Book Award (Wednesday Weeks and the Tower of Shadows)
- 2021 Shortlisted Speech Pathology Book of the Year Awards (Fiona Wood: Inventor of Spray-on Skin)
- 2021 CBCA Notables Book – Younger Readers (Wednesday Weeks and the Tower of Shadows)
- 2019 CBCA Notables Book – Eve Pownall Awards (Zeros and Ones)
- 2019 Shortlisted Speech Pathology Australia Awards (Zeros and Ones)
- 2019 Shortlisted Wilderness Society Environmental Award for Children's Literature (Off The Track)
- 2019 Shortlisted West Australia Young Readers Book Award (To The Lighthouse)
- 2018 Finalist SCBWI Crystal Kite Award ANZ (To The Lighthouse)
- 2026 Shortlisted Young Adult Book of the Year, WA Premier's Book Awards (A New World Rises)

== Selected publications ==
=== Books ===
- Burne, C. Off the Track. (Fremantle Press, 2018) ISBN 978-1-925591-74-3
- Burne, C. Beneath the Trees. (Fremantle Press, 2021) ISBN 978-1-76099-041-1
- Burne, C. Into the Blue. (Fremantle Press, 2024) ISBN 978-1-76099-387-0
- Burne, C., Jackson Harvey and Alex Towler, A New World Rises: Tales of a LEGO® Future (Fremantle Press, 2025) ISBN 978-1-76099-416-7.
- Burne, C. One Day Soon. (Fremantle Press, 2026) ISBN 978-1-76099-561-4.

=== Articles ===
Burne, C. 'How can universities build trust in science', Australian University Science [Refraction Media].
