= The World's Best (magazine) =

General interest magazine

- Editor-in-Chief: Artemio L Pretila Jr
- Categories: general interest magazine
- Frequency: quarterly
- Publisher: ALPJ and Sons
- Founded: 2022
- Country: Australia
- Based in: South Australia
- Language: English
- Website: The World's Best Magazine
- ISSN: 2653-5890

The World's Best is a quarterly print and online general interest magazine founded in South Australia. It started with books and has expanded to other niches. Its stated mission is to "curate, celebrate, and elevate the best offerings from our world."

== Content ==
The magazine is a collaboration between The Chrysalis BREW Project and ALPJ and Sons, and aims to "present achievements and innovations across the globe." Its content is organised into several sections - Award Winners, Record Acers, Featured Lists, People's Choice, and Prime Perspectives. Featured insights include those from Judge Hiram E. Puig-Lugo, Leon Conrad, Anne Montgomery, Michelle M. Pillow, David Farkas, and Jawole Willa Jo Zollar.

It maps its online articles against the United Nations Sustainable Development Goals (SDGs). The publication hosts The World's Best Awards and The World's Best Book Awards. Past recipients have included Patagonia, Numi Organic Tea, Animal Welfare Institute, Google, Apple, Microsoft, Samsung, among others.

In 2022, the magazine received the Stellar Business Award for Best Online Magazine in Australia.

== See also ==
- List of magazines in Australia
