= Pat Callinan's 4x4 Adventures =

- Genre: Adventure travel docuseries
- Presented by: Pat Callinan
- Country of origin: Australia
- Original language: English
- No. of seasons: 14

Production
- Running time: 60 minutes
- Production company: Falls productions

Original release
- Network: Network Ten (2008); One (2009-present)
- Release: 11 October 2008 – present

Pat Callinan's 4x4 Adventures is an Australian adventure television series that airs on Network Ten on 11 October 2008 later on One since 2009.

The series has 16 seasons as of May 2024.

== Content ==
Pat Callinan visits iconic 4x4 destinations in Australia in his "trusty" Volkswagen Amarok. The show has a significant focus on environmental conservation and covers travel information, cutting-edge devices, and advice on driving.

== See also ==
- 4WD 24/7
- Overlanding
- Off-roading
