= Dairy Industry Association of Australia =

- Company type: Industry Association
- Industry: Food processing
- Founded: 24 March 1986
- Founder: Australian Dairy Institute Inc. and the Australian Society of Dairy Technology Inc
- Headquarters: Melbourne, Victoria
- Area served: Australia
- Services: Information, networking and professional development for the post-farmgate dairy sector in Australia
- Owner: Dairy Industry Association of Australia
- Website: Dairy Industry Association of Australia

The Dairy Industry Association of Australia (DIAA) is a not-for-profit industry association for dairy product manufacturers and allied trades.

The DIAA was incorporated on 24 March 1986, following the amalgamation of the Australian Dairy Institute and the Australian Society of Dairy Technology.

The DIAA is a member of the Global Dairy Platform

== DIAA history ==
The DIAA was incorporated on 24 March 1986, through the amalgamation of the Australian Dairy Institute (ADI) and the Australian Society of Dairy Technology (ASDT).

The two organisations had similar goals and a significant cross-membership. Amalgamation was seen as a way to combine resources and deliver value to members at the time of industry rationalisation and falling membership rates.

=== Australian Dairy Institute ===
The Butter Factories' Managers Association was formed in 1893 in Victoria, with other states joining in the 1900s and 1910s. After several name changes, in 1936 it became the Australian Institute of Dairy Factory Managers and Secretaries, changing to the Australian Dairy Institute in 1979.

The institute launched the Butter Fats and Solids journal in 1942, which became Australian Dairy Foods in 1979.

=== Australian Society of Dairy Technology ===
The Australian Society of Dairy Technology (ASDT) was founded in 1945 by food technologists who took the long-term view of the dairy industry. The society's goal was to advocate for ‘best possible use of all milk’ by improving processing methods and finding better ways to use skim milk as food.

ASDT's official publication, the Australian Journal of Dairy Technology, began publication in 1946. The society also held regular conferences and technical meetings.
