= Pix (magazine) =

Australian pictorial magazine

"Pix" magazine
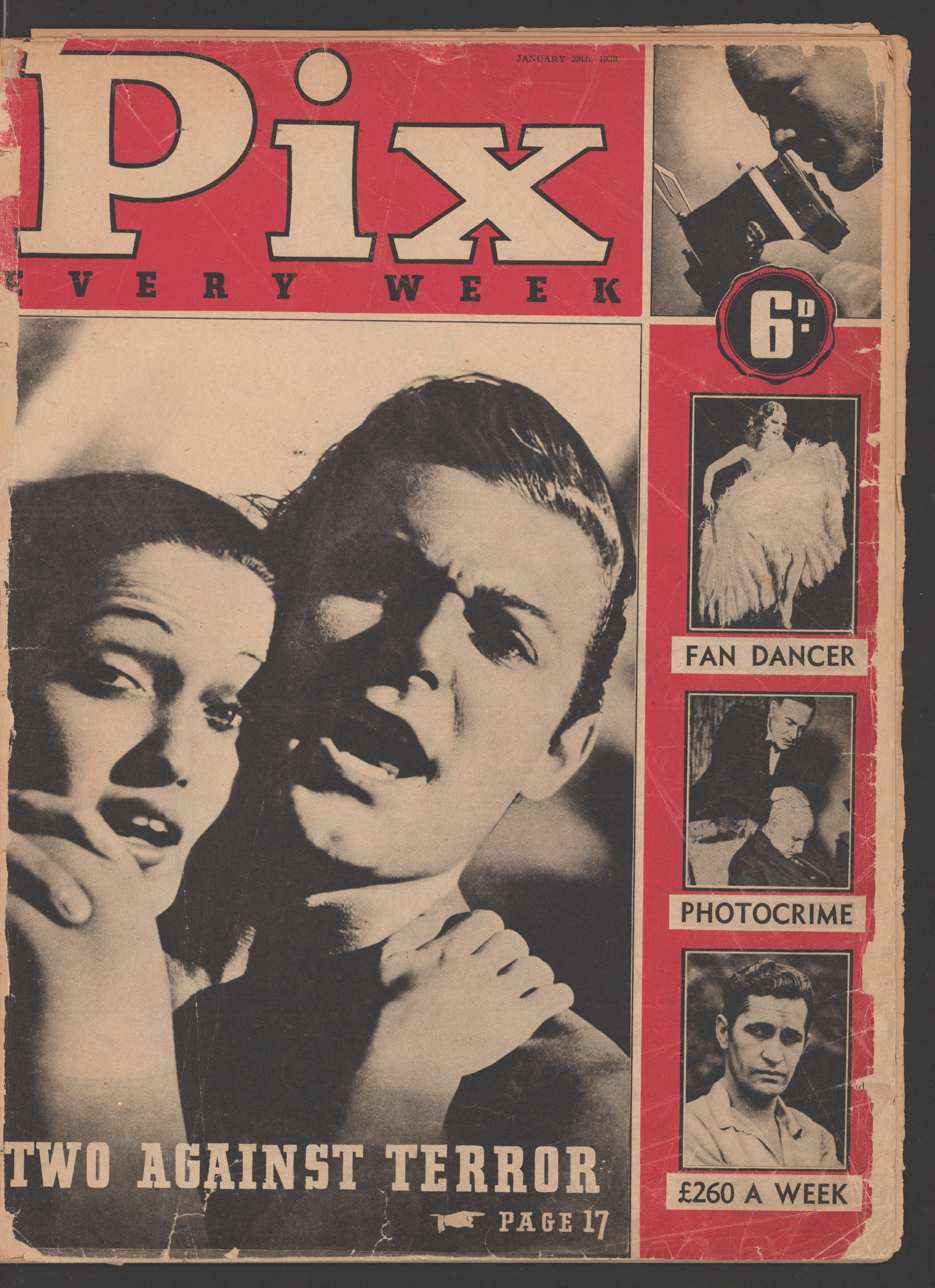
- Cover of first edition of Pix Magazine, January 1938
- Type: Pictorial Magazine
- Format: Magazine
- Publisher: Sungravure Ltd
- Editor-in-chief: Lionel B Foster
- Founded: January 29, 1938; 88 years ago
- Ceased publication: 1972
- Headquarters: Sydney
- Country: Australia

== History ==
The first edition of Pix magazine was published on 29 January 1938. Initially a weekly publication, it came out every Wednesday. Australia was emerging from the depression years and PIX reflected the more optimistic and liberal mood of the colony in its sesquicentennial year.

Editor Lionel B Foster wanted to create a new kind of weekly, one with a focus on telling stories using photographs which would challenge and confront as much as comfort the reader. Initially, 48 pages long, the images within the covers were beautifully rendered using the gravure process. Whilst Lionel Foster was intent on providing quality and attention to detail he was determined to also present them in a vivid and striking manner.

As Foster put it, Only pictures that have a real interest will be published. Some of them may be bizarre even to the point of starkness. Many could hardly be called beautiful yet all will be unusual striking and packed with news and interest.

In May 1951 PIX magazine increased its Australian content, expanded in size and became a fortnightly publication. On 6 December 1953 Foster died at his home in Pymble, Sydney. The following year the controlling interest in its publisher Sungravure Ltd was sold by Associated Newspapers Ltd to Oldhams Press Ltd, one of England's biggest publishers. The success of PIX saw the emergence of tabloid periodicals like Australasian Post (1946–96) and People (1947–68), and in 1972 Pix and People merged.

One of the magazine's best features was its focus on Australian content with pages of Aussie jokes and cartoons as well as photo stories by PIX's own camera operators. The images, whilst popular at the time, are now acknowledged as historical documents in their own right depicting life in Australia over the last half of the twentieth century. Over its lifetime the magazine employed a number press photographers, many of with specialised subject areas. These included: Norman Herfort, Patricia Holmes, Ian Grime, Alec Iverson, Ivan Ive, Vic Johnston, Ray Olsen, and concentrated on stories about daily life around the nation.

Pix also favoured more liberalised attitudes towards sex in its articles and its daring covers reflected stories on adultery, hedonism and sexuality. At the height of its popularity Pix magazine was read by millions of Australians.

== See also ==
- List of magazines in Australia
