= The Helix (magazine) =

Australian science magazine

- Cover of the December 2012 issue
- Editor: Jasmine Fellows
- Categories: Popular science
- Frequency: Bi-monthly
- Founded: 1986
- Company: CSIRO Publishing
- Country: Australia
- Based in: Canberra
- Language: Australian English
- Website: www.csiro.au/thehelix
- ISSN: 1033-3096
- OCLC: 173357248

The Helix was a bi-monthly teen science magazine published by CSIRO Publishing, as the young-adult bi-monthly magazine of the Double Helix Science Club. The magazine was established in 1986 as the newsletter for the science club. Soon afterwards, it grew into a magazine in its own right. In 1999, a spin-off science magazine for younger readers, called Scientriffic, was created.

The magazine was usually 40 pages long and trimmed to quarto paper size. It typically contained articles about science and mathematics of interest to teens.

The magazine was relaunched in July 2015 as Double Helix, combining both Scientriffic and The Helix into one magazine, starting from Issue 1, with 8 issues per year.

In 2025, it was announced that Double Helix would no longer be published effective June 2025.

== Editors ==
The final editor-in-chief was Sarah Kellett. Previous editors have included Ross Kingsland, Darren Osborne, Simon Torok, Kath Kovac, Tanya Patrick, Gabrielle Tramby, Maaroof Fakhri and Jasmine Fellows.
