= Dun's Gazette for New South Wales =

English language journal (1909–1958)

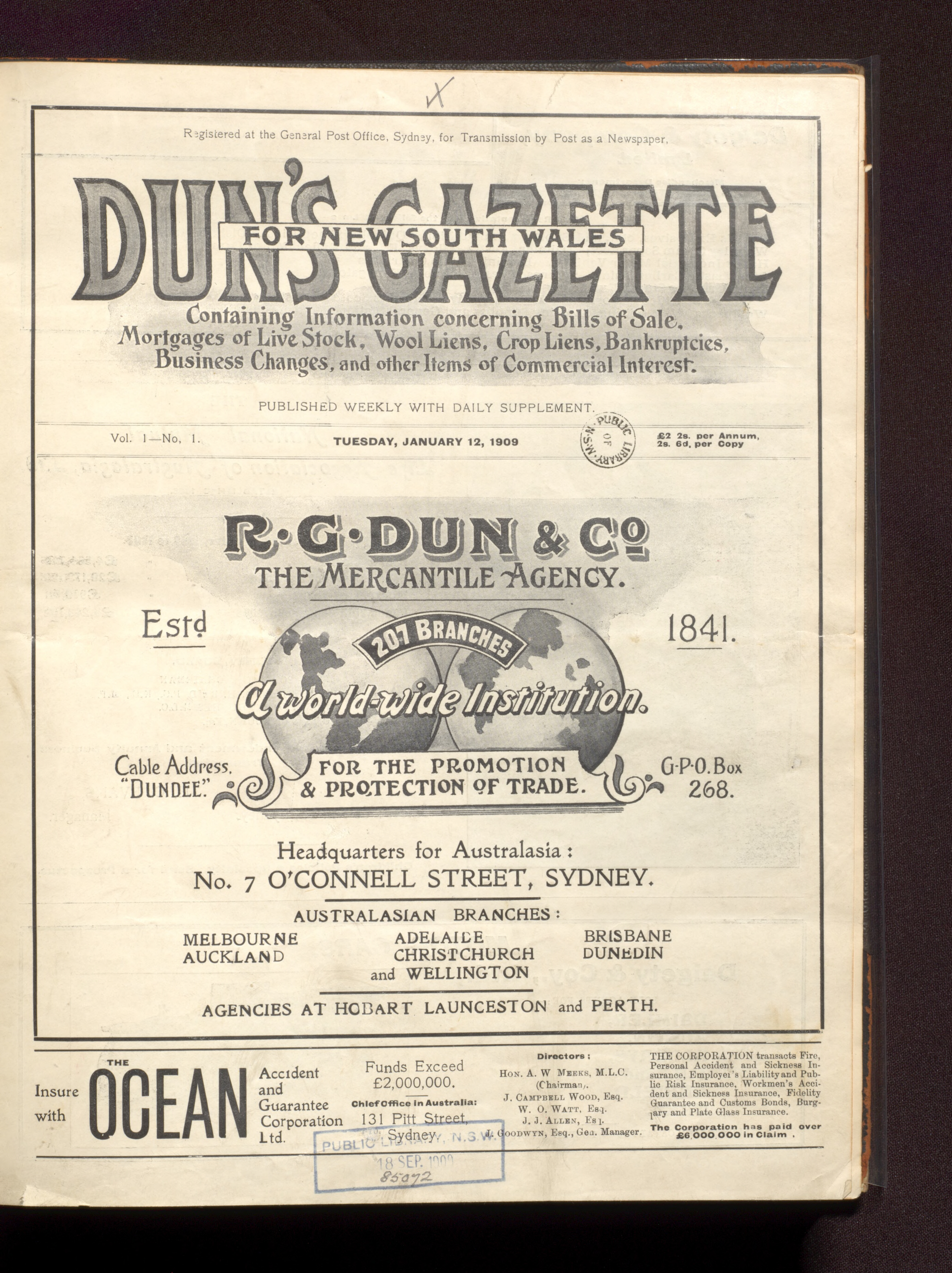

Dun's Gazette for New South Wales, also published under a number of other titles, was an Australian weekly English-language journal published in Sydney from 1909 to 1958.

== History ==
Dun's Gazette for New South Wales began with Vol 1, no. 1, on 12 January 1909. Its stated contents were "Information concerning Bills of Sale, Mortgages of Live Stock, Wool Liens, Crop Liens, Bankruptcies, Business Changes, and other Items of Commercial Interest." It was printed for the mercantile agency R.G. Dun & Co., which saw itself as "a world-wide institution for the promotion & protection of trade". Its Australasian headquarters were in Sydney but it also had offices in Melbourne, Adelaide, Brisbane, Auckland, Christchurch, Dunedin and Wellington.

In June 1958 its title changed to Dun's Gazette (New South Wales edition) and was published under this masthead until 24 April 1959. On 1 May 1959, it became the Dun & Bradstreet Gazette (New South Wales and Canberra edition) and continued as this until 17 September 1971.

On 8 October 1971 the journal's name changed yet again, simplified to Dun's until 6 July 1979. On 13 July 1979 its name reverted to Dun's Gazette (Sydney, N.S.W.) until 7 February 1996. From 14 February 1996 until 23 December 1998 it was published by Dun & Bradstreet Information Services as The Business Gazette. New South Wales & A.C.T. Finally, from 22 January 1999 until 26 September 2001 it was published as D & B Gazette. New South Wales.

== Digitisation ==
This publication has been digitised at Trove by the National Library of Australia.

== See also ==
Dun & Bradstreet
