= Scientific Australian =

Scientific Australian was an Australian quarterly learned journal established in 1895 by Melbourne publisher Phillips, Ormonde & Co. The first issue appeared in September that year. It featured articles on to the arts and industries. It was published monthly from 1921 until it was disestablished in 1924. The last issue of Scientific Australian was published on 15 November 1924.
