= Soccer International =

Soccer International is an Australian monthly magazine devoted to football (soccer). It was established in 1993.

Soccer International provides interviews and coverage of all the major competitions through the world and in depth coverage of the Australian A-League and Australia's international campaigns including the Joeys, Olyroos, Socceroos and Matildas.

The magazine also prints news on developments in the game including technology in football gear, boots, training aids and techniques. Each World Cup is commemorated by a special edition.
