= The Picture (magazine) =

Australian men's magazine

- The Picture magazine (3 April 2013 cover)
- Categories: Men's magazines
- Frequency: Weekly
- Publisher: Bauer Media Pty Ltd
- Founded: 1988
- Final issue: 23 December 2019
- Company: Bauer Media Group
- Country: Australia
- Based in: Sydney

The Picture was an Australian men's magazine published that was launched in 1988. It has been described as softcore pornography and was classified with a Mature (M) rating. The magazine was based in Sydney and was published weekly. The Picture was read by 31,000 people a week in 2012; figures from after 2012 are not available as then publisher Australian Consolidated Press withdrew the magazine from circulation audits following drops in sales.

In October 2019, then publisher Bauer Media Group announced that The Picture would be cease publication following their issue released on 23 December 2019. Bauer stated declining sales were responsible for the magazine's closure, with the news coming after both 7-Eleven and BP announced they would no longer sell the magazine due to its sexualised content.

== See also ==
- People (Australian magazine)
