= Tasmania 40° South =

Australian magazine

Tasmania 40°South
- Cover of Autumn 2010 issue
- Editor: Chris Champion
- Frequency: Quarterly
- Founded: 1997
- Company: Forty South Publishing Pty Ltd
- Country: Australia
- Language: English
- Website: Tasmania 40° South
- ISSN: 1325-1058

Tasmania 40° South is an independent Australian magazine focusing on the society, culture and lifestyle of Tasmania. It has been published quarterly since 1997. It was once described by Hobart's Mercury newspaper as "a lifestyle magazine with brains".
