= LivingNow =

- September 2007 cover of LivingNow: Yoga
- Editor: Elizabeth Jewell
- CEO: Emma Stephens
- Categories: Health and lifestyle magazine
- Frequency: Monthly
- Circulation: 65,000 copies monthly in 2016
- Publisher: LivingNow Media
- Founded: 1989
- Company: LivingNow Media
- Country: Australia
- Language: Australian English
- Website: www.livingnow.com.au
- ISSN: 1445-8381

LivingNow is Australia's largest holistic magazine (measured by distribution and estimated readership). The magazine is a monthly independent periodical, with mainly local Australian content, and some international content. The magazine's editor-in-chief is Elizabeth Jewell, who started the magazine Whole Person (the predecessor to LivingNow) in 1989. It is estimated that Elizabeth Stephens is the longest-serving editor-in-chief in the health and wellbeing niche in Australia. The CEO of LivingNow (and all associated publications) is Emma Stephens.

LivingNow had a Circulations Audit Board (CAB) distribution of 177,652 copies between October 2006 and March 2007. This included the free version only. Living Now Media currently produces the printed magazine: LivingNow, available free at health food shops, organic stores, holistic stores, selected niche-related gift/book shops, and the online version of the magazine.
