= Railway Transportation =

Australian rail transport magazine

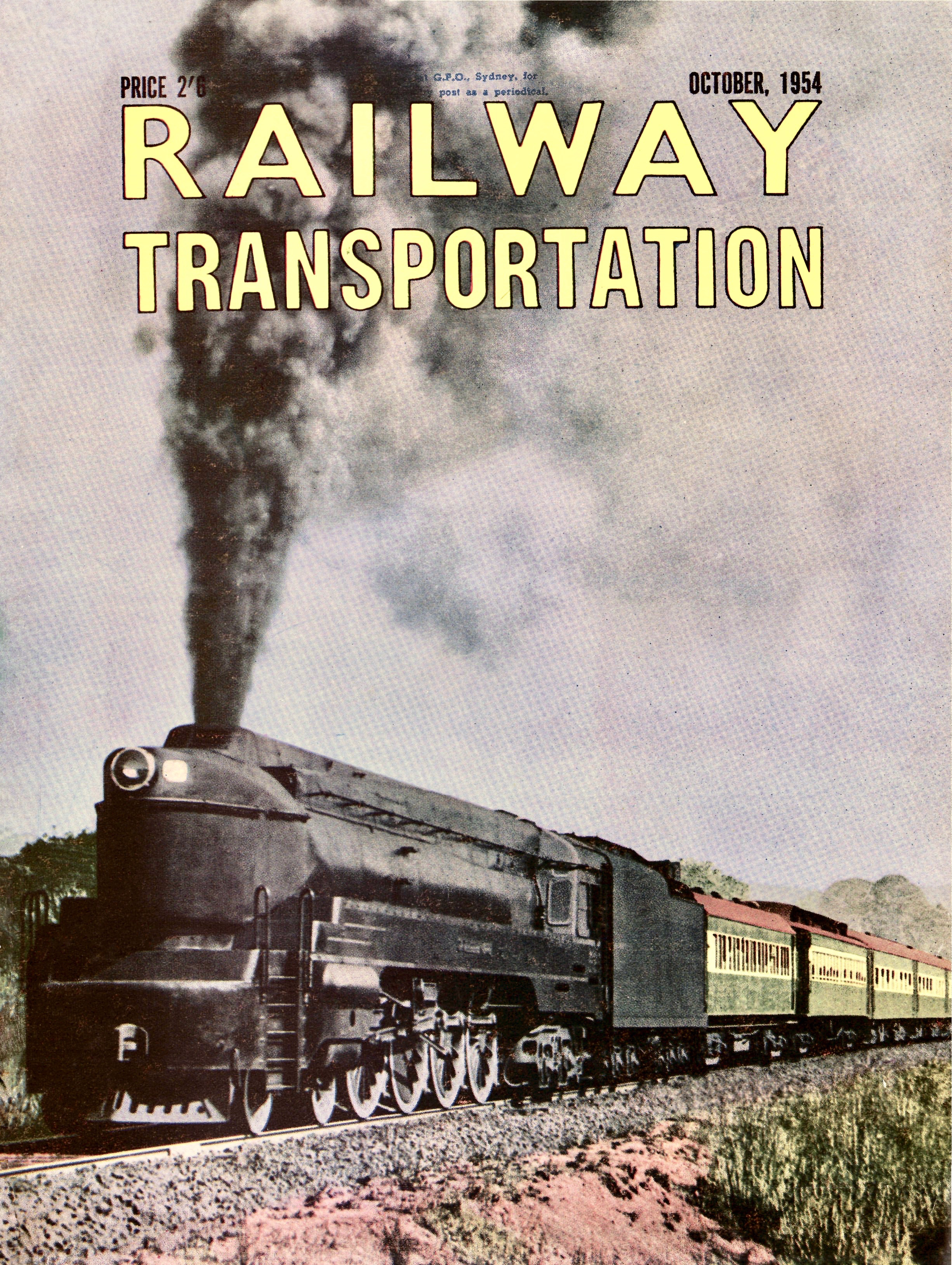
- Former editors: Geoff Johnson (1959-1974); Frank Shennen (1951-1959)
- Categories: Transport
- Frequency: Monthly
- Publisher: Shennen Publishing
- Founder: Frank Shennen
- First issue: October 1951
- Final issue: December 1974
- Country: Australia
- Based in: Surry Hills
- Language: Australian English
- ISSN: 0311-0532

Railway Transportation was a Sydney-based monthly trade magazine covering rail transport in Australia. It was regularly used for promotion and advertising by railway organisations and businesses.

== Overview ==
Railway Transportation was established in October 1951 by Frank Shennen.

Shennen Publishing already published Truck & Bus Transportation and, in 1967, established Freight & Container Transportation magazine.

After being re-branded Railway & Urban Transportation in January 1974, publication of the magazine ceased in December 1974.
