= Australian Bartender magazine =

Monthly Australian magazine

- Categories: Trade magazine
- Frequency: monthly
- Publisher: Spanton Media Group Pty Ltd
- Founded: 1999; 26 years ago
- Country: Australia
- Based in: Sydney
- Language: English
- Website: australianbartender.com.au

Australian Bartender is a monthly magazine owned by the Australian media company Spanton Media Group Pty Ltd.

The magazine also has its own awards and is a host of Sydney Bar Week.
