= Cosmos (Australian magazine) =

Science magazine

COSMOS
- Editors: Gail MacCallum (Cosmos) and Ian Connellan (Royal Institution of Australia)
- Categories: Popular science
- Frequency: Quarterly in print; online
- Total circulation: 114,000 (2022)
- Founded: 2004
- First issue: 21 June 2005
- Company: CSIRO Publishing
- Country: Australia
- Based in: Adelaide
- Language: English
- Website: CosmosMagazine.com
- ISSN: 1832-522X

Cosmos (subtitled The Science of Everything) was a science magazine published in Adelaide, South Australia, by CSIRO Publishing that covers science globally. It appeared four times a year in print as Cosmos Magazine, and the online edition is updated daily with news as well as long features and multi-media content, and included the print magazine content. Cosmos Weekly was a subscription-based weekly online edition published on Fridays, and a podcast was launched in April 2022. The print version ended in the summer of 2025.

== History ==
The magazine was established in Sydney in November 2004 by the Sydney magazine publishing executive Kylie Ahern and science journalist Wilson da Silva. with the first issue published in July 2005.

In June 2006, the magazine launched a daily Internet news and features service.

The magazine was the originator of Hello from Earth, a web-based initiative to send messages from the public, each just 160 characters in length, to Gliese 581d, the (then) nearest Earth-like planet outside the Solar System. Created as a science communication exercise for 2009 National Science Week in Australia, it collected nearly 26,000 messages that were beamed by NASA's Canberra Deep Space Communication Complex on 28 August 2009.

In June 2013 the company, then owned by Luna Media, moved to Melbourne following its acquisition in February 2013 by Australia's Chief Scientist, Alan Finkel, and his wife Elizabeth Finkel, a science journalist, who became editor-in-chief. The Finkels were already part-owners, and acquired the remainder from Ahern and Da Silva, who remained on the editorial staff.

On 1 September 2018, custodianship of the magazine was transferred to Royal Institution of Australia, a not-for-profit science media organisation based in Adelaide. In April 2021 Cosmos Weekly was launched, and exactly a year later, a podcast on the LiSTNR app, featuring science explainers, was launched.

On 14 June 2024, Cosmos, including the quarterly Cosmos Magazine, digital science news service, and the education unit of the Royal Institution of Australia and Scinema was transferred to CSIRO Publishing, the independent publishing arm of the CSIRO, Australia's national science agency. The move was supported by funding from the CSIRO, the Commonwealth, and the South Australian Governments. During the following month, six AI generated articles made using GPT-4 were published to its website, garnering criticism from its contributors, who said they had not been informed of the decision, as well as its cofounders.

Writers whose work have featured include Margaret Wertheim, Jared Diamond, Tim Flannery, Richard Dawkins, Edward O. Wilson, Michio Kaku, Susan Greenfield, Steven Pinker, Paul Davies, Simon Singh and Oliver Sacks.

== Description ==
Cosmos' subtitle and byline is "The Science of Everything". The quarterly print magazine, Cosmos Magazine, is a science magazine published in Adelaide by CSIRO Publishing, covering international developments in science. The online edition is updated daily with news as well as long features and multi-media content. Cosmos Weekly is a subscription-based weekly online edition published on Fridays.

In the 12 months to March 2022, the print readership of Cosmos had increased 115.1% on the previous year, lifting it to 114,000.

== People ==
Ian Connellan was editor-in-chief of the Royal Institution of Australia, while Gail MacCallum was managing editor of Cosmos Magazine. Other former editors include Heather Catchpole, Jasmine Fellows and David Shaw.

== Recognition and awards ==
Cosmos Magazine won 48 journalism and industry awards under Da Silva's editorship, including Magazine of the Year at the Bell Awards for Publishing Excellence in 2009 and 2006, and Editor of the Year in 2006 and 2005.

It won a Reuters/World Conservation Union Award for Excellence in Environmental Reporting, an Earth Journalism Award and the American Institute of Physics Science Writing Award.
