= South Australian Football Budget =

- Categories: Sports
- Frequency: Weekly during season
- Publisher: Boylen Media
- First issue: 1914
- Country: Australia
- Based in: Adelaide, South Australia

The South Australian Football Budget is the matchday programme of the South Australian National Football League (SANFL).

== History ==
A publication known as the SA Football Budget was first produced in 1914 but was discontinued due to the onset of the First World War. After the return of competition the magazine returned as the SA Footballer, later changing to the current name.

The Budget is a 24-page publication. At its core are the lists of teams playing each weekend, along with player statistics and details of umpires. Contents include footballer profiles, action photography, columns, mini-league teams, premierships tables and various statistics. The regular cost of the magazine is $5.

The magazine is owned by the South Australian National Football League (SANFL) and has been published by Boylen Media on behalf of the SANFL since 1994. The equivalent magazine for the Australian Football League (AFL) is the AFL Record, which was first produced in 1912. The Budget is sold at all SANFL league matches and also at newsstands in Rundle Mall in Adelaide.

== See also ==
- AFL Record
- Football Budget (Western Australia)
