= People (Australian magazine) =

Australian men's magazine

- People magazine (9 July 2012 cover)
- Categories: Men's magazines
- Frequency: Fortnightly
- Publisher: Bauer Media Pty Ltd
- First issue: 1950
- Final issue: 2019
- Company: Bauer Media Group
- Country: Australia
- Based in: Sydney

People was a fortnightly Australian lad's mag owned by Bauer Media Group.

== Overview ==
The magazine had been published since 1950. It is not to be confused with the gossip magazine known by that name in the United States; that magazine is published under the name Who in Australia.

People focused on celebrity interviews and scandal, glamour photography, sex stories sent in by readers, puzzle, crosswords, and a jokes page. The publisher was Bauer Media Pty Ltd. The headquarters was in Sydney.

People was reportedly the first weekly magazine in Australia to feature topless models.

== History ==
1950s

People was first published in 1950; it covered "everything from news, to scandals, to true crime stories."

1970s

Pix, a weekly men's magazine, merged with People in 1972.

1980s

People magazine started a "Covergirl of the Year" quest in the early 1980s with Samantha Fox an early winner. The 1985 winner was Carolyn Kent. People had a deliberate policy of searching for "average Aussie birds" from 1985 onwards, trying to veer away from a reliance on U.K. Page 3 girl pictorials (though Page 3 girls still appeared, and indeed, Tracey Coleman was named Covergirl of the year in 1992 and 1994). Mostly scouted by and photographed by Walter Glover, many popular "average" girls became very popular and frequent cover girls. These include Lynda Lewis, Lisa Russell, Narelle Nixon, Melinda Smith, Raquel Samuels, Tanja Adams (real name Tanja Adamiak), and Belinda Harrow (who also appeared as the debut cover–centre of Picture magazine in 1988.

At its peak in the mid-1980s, People sold about 250,000 copies a week and was the fourth biggest-selling weekly magazine in Australia. Then editor David Naylor said women were 30 per cent of the magazine's audience: "They liked doing the giant crossword on the train, and the stories were fun. We had a few nipples but it was all very wholesome and non-threatening."

1990s

Though published by the same company, People had an early fierce rivalry with The Picture magazine. Many models defected from People to The Picture, and vice versa. In the early 1990s, People followed the lead of The Picture and introduced "Home Girls" – amateur photos sent in by female readers. The Picture was seriously eroding People's sales figures by featuring fully nude photos, as opposed to People's topless-only stance. In 1992, People fought back, and went fully nude. Gold Coast model Lisa Haslem became a figurehead at this time. Also, it began to feature more celebrities and once again returned to Page three girls or American models. The reliance on Australian talent diminished.

In 1992, the magazine was the subject of controversy for featuring a "woman on all fours in a dog collar" on its cover, which prompted "feminist uni students to protest in the streets." The edition was banned from display by the Office of Film and Literature Classification and withdrawn from newsagents by its publisher.

2000s

In October 2000, the Big Pineapple, a tourist attraction on the Sunshine Coast, was used as a backdrop for one of People's photo spreads. Its operators claimed that the magazine's team "entered the park without permission" and the photos had "tarnished a squeaky clean reputation". They were reported to have been taking legal action and their lawyers sought a retraction and apology from the magazine.

2010s

From January to March 2012, People's average sales were fewer than 28,000 copies a week. It was announced on 23 October 2019 that both People and The Picture magazines would cease production at the end of 2019 following being dropped from the shelves of major convenience stores.

== See also ==
- The Picture (magazine)
