= Womankind (magazine) =

- Editor: Antonia Case
- Categories: Women, Culture, Art, Design, Psychology, Fashion
- Frequency: Quarterly
- Publisher: Poet Press
- Founded: 2014
- First issue: 28 July 2014
- Country: Worldwide
- Based in: Paris, France
- Language: English, Korean
- ISSN: 2203-5850

Womankind is an independent ad-free newsstand women's magazine distributed throughout the UK, Australia, NZ, Europe, Asia, the US, and Canada. The Sydney Morning Herald reported that it had "an initial circulation of 20,000 and is aiming to find a broad demographic of smart women interested in big ideas about philosophy, sociology and psychology.". It is distributed in 3,000 news agents in Australia, as well as in thousands of stores worldwide. Womankind was the best-selling item in the history of the Byron Bay Writers' Festival when it launched there in 2014 and is one of the world's few ad-free newsstand publications. It is produced by the team behind the world's most widely distributed philosophy magazine, New Philosopher, which launched in 2013 and is available in Australia, NZ, the US, Canada and the UK. Both New Philosopher and Womankind were co-founded by Zan Boag and Antonia Case, who are editors of the two publications.

== Ad-free ==
The ad-free format attracted commentary from media organisations: ArtsHub noted that it had climbed steadily to the top of women's magazines to compete with Marie Claire and Vogue and describes it as "disrupting the publishing industry as it feeds the souls of a broad demographic of smart women interested in big ideas about philosophy, sociology and psychology." Broadsheet describes it as "changing the concept of what a women's magazine is".

== Awards ==
The launch cover of Womankind featured Simone de Beauvoir and was voted one of the top in the world by German media website MEEDIA; in 2016 the magazine's editor Antonia Case was shortlisted for Editor of the Year in The Stack Awards 2016. Earlier in 2016 Library Journal selected Womankind as one of the best magazines in the US for 2015, saying that "the distinguished contributors and artists deliver insightful and intriguing ideas via text, photography, and drawings" and that "although created predominantly by and for women, it will have much to offer independent thinkers of all genders."

== Contributors ==
Contributors include Booker Prize winner DBC Pierre, winner of the Australasian Association of Philosophy Media Professionals Award and Editorial Director of New Philosopher Antonia Case, Irish Book Awards winner Niamh Boyce, Commonwealth Short Story Prize winner and Miles Franklin Award shortlistee Lucy Treloar, Commonwealth Writers' Prize winner and Miles Franklin Award shortlistee Charlotte Wood, Professor of Philosophy Massimo Pigliucci, and Australian author of 40 novels and winner of the American Library Association Award for Best Historical Fiction Kate Forsyth.
