= Freight & Container Transportation =

- Editor: Frank Shennen
- Categories: Transport
- Frequency: Monthly
- Publisher: Shennen Publishing
- Founder: Frank Shennen
- First issue: May 1967
- Final issue: June 1985
- Country: Australia
- Based in: Surry Hills
- Language: Australian English
- ISSN: 0016-0865

Freight & Container Transportation was a Sydney based monthly trade magazine covering freight transport in Australia. It was published between May 1967 and June 1985.

== Overview ==
Freight & Container Transportation was established in May 1967 by Shennen Publishing, that already published Railway Transportation and Truck & Bus Transportation. It focussed on the road, sea and air freight industries in Australia. It ceased publication in June 1985.
