= Peter Smith (painter) =

British painter

- Born: 4 July 1967 (age 59); Mansfield, Nottinghamshire, England
- Spouse: Jayne Smith

Peter Smith (born in Mansfield 1967) is a contemporary British artist.

The subject for which his artwork often features a striped rotund creature with the form of a hippopotamus but the stripes of a zebra, which are known as 'Zeppos' or 'Impossimals'.

Smith is a self-taught artist who in 2005 contributed an artwork to the BBC's "Children in Need". He became professional, teaming-up with Washington Green Fine Art Publishing.

== 2005 ==
In May 2005 he released his first Washington Green collection "The Art of Surprise", containing eight limited edition prints:

- "I Love You"
- "A Fool's Moon"
- "With All My Heart"
- "Tall Paul"
- "The Management"
- "So It's Not Fancy Dress Then?"
- "Mr Lubba Lubba"
- "Meet The Firm"

In June four further prints were released as part of the summer release:

- "Can I Have My Ball Back?"
- "Lucinda"
- "Love Avalanche"
- "Mummy!"

July saw the release of one print as part of an MBNA Credit Card Special entitled ""Love Is All Around You"

September saw the release of two more prints on general release: "Love Boat" and "Tunnel of Love"

November saw the release of the final print of the year as a Christmas release, "Is That It?"

In total 16 different prints were released in 2005.

== 2006 ==
2006 saw 21 different prints released, making it his most prolific year of released works

February 2006 saw the release of "Tails of the Unexpected", a collection of eight prints:

- "Are We There Yet?"
- "You're Beautiful"
- "We Are Family"
- "Always And Forever"
- "When Two Hearts Beat As One"
- "Scenes of Mild Peril"
- "That Old Devil Called Love"
- "Shall We Dance?"

Between March and November a further eight prints were released on general release:

- "Romper Room"
- "Pile High Club"
- "Meet The Lubbas"
- "Catch A Falling Heart"
- "I'll Get My Coat"
- "Playtime"
- "The Crying Game" (first print to be released on box canvas rather than giclee on paper"
- "The Kiss"

June 2006 saw the release of five World Cup themed prints collectively called "Smithy's World Cup Heroes"

- "Spirit of '66"
- "You'll Never Walk Alone"
- "I Never Touched Him"
- "The Biggest Fan"
- "Heading for Glory"

== 2007 ==
Across 2007 six general release prints were released (in February and September)

- "The Moon And Back"
- "Bunny My Honey"
- "Naughty But Nice"
- "When Boy Meets Girl"
- "Forever by My Side"
- "We Are The Boys"

== 2008 ==
There were a total of 17 releases across 2008, starting in January with two Valentine releases entitled "Love Actually" and "Be Mine"

February/September were again the release months for a series of general releases:

- "The Naughty Step"
- "Summer Loving"
- "It's The Little Things"
- ""My Feet Hurt"
- "Make A Wish"
- "Pick Me"
- "Me And Mum"
- "Am I Bothered?"

A new collection "*May Contain Nuts" was also released in September, containing 7 prints:

- "*May Contain Nuts"
- "Meet The Lubbas"
- "Do You Come Here Often?"
- "All Roads Lead To You" (first print to be released on canvas on board)
- "Hiding My Love"
- "In Your Arms"
- "How Deep Is Your Love?"

== 2009 ==
As with the previous two years, general releases were made in February and September. This time a total of twelve general release prints:

- "Bad Boys"
- "Party Animals"
- "Together We Make A Family"
- "Love Shack"
- "I've Been Very, Very, Naughty"
- "I Like Shopping And Shopping Likes Me"
- "For The One I Love"
- "Sofa Loafers"
- "Hug Me"
- "Cuddle Me"
- "Sweet Talk"
- "Some Bunny Loves You"

== 2010 ==
In a change from previous years, general releases were made in February and June (as opposed to September):

- "Guess How Much I Love You"
- "All You Need Is Love"
- "Born To Be Wild"
- "Forever Family"
- "Pillow Talk"
- "I Eat Cake"

September saw the release of a new seven piece collection entitled "It's A Stripe Thing"

- "Opposites Attract"
- "Baby on Board"
- "Hold Me Close"
- "Forget Me Not"
- "You're Beautiful"
- "No Place Like Home"
- "Icing With Death"

Additionally, a sculpture was released for the first time entitled "Naughty Step", based on the print of the same name from 2008.

In 2010 Smith took part in London's Elephant Parade, creating an 'Impossimal' version of a baby elephant named an "Impossiphant".

== 2011 ==
In a return to the previously common format, 2011 saw a total of eleven general release prints, occurring in February and September:

- "The Family"
- "Still Naughty"
- "Thumpers in Jumpers"
- "Donut Touch"
- "Macarooned"
- "The Best Things in Life Are Sweet"
- "Love Seat"
- "Dog's Look Up, Cat's Look Down"
- "Under New Management"
- "Sweet Hearts"
- "I Need Some Bunny To Love"

November saw the release of a Christmas print entitled "The Snuggler"

== 2012 ==
2012 was Smith's least prolific years to date for the traditional Impossimals, seeing the release of only four general release prints, all in September:

- "The Lovers"
- "One at a Time Please"
- "Home Comforts"
- "Forever Together"

=== Lost Impossimals ===
In 2012 Smith unveiled a new set of characters entitled "Lost Impossimals". Each image is hand built as a living scene in a studio before being transformed to canvas, in a process taking around eight weeks in total.

According to Smith the Lost Impossimal series is: "A bewitching bewilderment of Impossimal creation with wondrous tales of weird woes and made up memories twisted with history, all based around the notes and diaries of a fictitious and intrepid Victorian explorer called Charles Burroughs."

=== 2013 ===
In February "All 4 Love" a collection of four prints was released:

- "From The Moment We Met"
- "Where Our Love Grows"
- "It Must Be Love"
- "Happy Ever After"

Additionally two general release prints were issued: "Cake O'Clock", and "Meet The Family"

=== 2014 ===
Ten new general release prints were issued in 2014, once again in February and September:

- "Chocolanche"
- "Rub-A-Dub Tub"
- "Four in a Bed"
- "Super Scooper"
- "99 Problems"
- "Our House"
- "It's Love"
- "What A Load of Balls"
- "Memories"
- "Like A Boss"

Three new sculptures were also released matching three of these prints: "Super Scooper", "99 Problems", and "Rub-A-Dub Tub"

=== 2015 ===
The Spring Collection saw the release of five prints:

- "Your Love Lifts Me Higher"
- "A Balanced Diet"
- "Go Big Or Go Home"
- "You Scream, We Scream, We All Scream For Ice Cream"
- "This Is How We Roll"

==== Lost Alice ====
2015 saw the release of Lost Alice, a highly collectable and award-winning series of ongoing paintings, limited editions, sculptures and a book called 'Lost Alice & Other Tall Stories'. The Lost Alice series is also credited as "by Peter & Jayne Smith"

=== 2016 ===
February saw the release of three prints as part of the "Spring Collection"; "Sweet Dreams Are Made of This", "You Are Fab", and "Donut Worry, Be Happy"

In September a new seven print collection "A Cup of Team and a Slice of Bake" was issued following a biscuit/cake theme:

- "Let Them Eat Cake"
- "You're My Cup of Tea"
- "No Soggy Bottoms"
- "Rolling Scones"
- "Family Pack"
- "Bake Off"
- "I Love A Good Dunk"

This series is the first to exclusively use canvas on board as the medium.

=== 2017 ===
February, June, and September saw three different collections released, with no prints released under a "general release" banner.

==== February – "Showstopper Collection" ====
- "You're The Biscuit to My Tea"
- "You Bake Me Love You"
- "The Heartful Dodgers"
- "When It's Scone, It's Scone!"
- "Rolling Scones" – sculpture

===== June – "Summer of Love" =====
- "Love Me Do"
- "All My Love"
- "A Forever Love"
- "Love From Me To You"

===== September – "Screwballed Collection" =====
- "Feeling Gintastic"
- "For Those About To Rock"
- "Snow Place Like Home"
- "You're Screwballed"
- "One Size Fits All"

=== 2018 ===
January 2018 saw the return of a Valentine's release, "The Colour of Love"

In February the follow-up to "You're Screwballed" was released, entitled "Screwballed Too", containing four prints, and two sculptures:

- "Minted"
- "Let The Party Be Gin"
- "Four Fox Sake"
- "Whisky Business"
- "You're My Cup of Tea" – sculpture
- "Our House" – sculpture

On 6 September 2018, a new four print collection "Sotally Tober" was released:

- "Kinda Care, Kinda Don't"
- "Sip, Sip Hooray!!"
- "Fizzy Rascals"
- "Size Matters
