= Atomic (magazine) =

Australian magazine

- February 2003 cover
- Editor: David Hollingworth
- Categories: Computer magazine
- Frequency: Monthly
- Circulation: 29,948
- First issue: 2001
- Final issue Number: 2012; 143
- Company: Future Australia
- Country: Australia
- Based in: Beaconsfield
- Language: English
- Website: forums.atomicmpc.com.au
- ISSN: 1444-8998
- OCLC: 223077363

Atomic (or Atomic MPC) was a monthly Australian magazine and online community that focused on computing and technology, with a great emphasis on gaming, modding and computer hardware. Atomic was marketed at technology enthusiasts and covered topics that were not normally found in mainstream PC publications, including video card and CPU overclocking, Windows registry tweaking, and programming. The magazine's strapline was 'Maximum Power Computing', reflecting the broad nature of its technology content.

In November 2012 publisher Haymarket Media Group announced that Atomic would close and be merged into sister monthly title PC & Tech Authority (beginning with the February 2013 issue of PCTA), although the Atomic online forums would continue to exist in their own right and under the Atomic brand.

In 2018, nextmedia, the successor of Haymarket Australia sold its computing assets to Future. PC & Tech Authority print content was absorbed into APC and online content was absorbed into TechRadar but the Atomic forums remained available until 11 June 2020.

== History ==
With a small team of writers led by magazine founder and ex-editor Ben Mansill, who is also the founder of the magazine's only competitor, PC PowerPlay, the first issue of Atomic was published in February 2001. This team consisted of John Gillooly, Bennett Ring, Tim Dean and Daniel Rutter. Gillooly and Ring later left the magazine.

Atomic was originally published by AJB Publishing, but in July 2004 AJB was acquired by UK publisher Haymarket Media. The magazine was edited in 2005 and 2006 by Ashton Mills, who in the past has contributed to PC Authority, Atomic's sister publication. In 2006, Logan Booker took over as editor. In April 2005, Atomic reached the milestone of 50 issues, and the January 2006 issue celebrated its fifth birthday. Logan Booker announced at the end of August 2007 he would be stepping down, issue 81 being his last as editor. In October 2007, David Hollingworth became the new editor of the magazine.

Ben Mansill announced in October 2007 that he would be leaving Haymarket Media to pursue other interests in the publishing industry.

Atomic celebrated then release of its 100th issue on April 8, 2009. In late 2012 the magazine merged with PC & Tech Authority. In 2013, nextmedia acquired Haymarket Australia which effectively made PC & Tech Authority a sister title to PC PowerPlay.

== The Atomic site and forums ==
Atomic's online forums were launched on the same day as the magazine. They had various PC gaming and technology sections, as well as a general chat area known as the "Green Room". As of January 2006, approximately 3,600,000 posts had been made across the forums' twenty-one sections. An active community section organises 'meets' and other events regularly.

Readers and subscribers to the magazine, as well as members of the online Atomic community were colloquially referred to as Atomicans.

In mid-2005, the site was revamped to include regular content, both unique to the site and taken from the magazine, including daily reviews and news.

Moderation was employed to ensure that illegal or distasteful content was not posted.

The forums were finally shut down in the 11th of June, 2020. It was totally offline on 24 June.

== Events ==
At the end of 2005 Atomic hosted "Atomic Live", a PC gaming and technology expo in Sydney, Australia. The event culminated in the evening with a presentation of industry awards and a celebration of the magazine's 5th birthday.

Although a subsequent Atomic Live was announced in early 2006, it was postponed due to key product launch delays in the PC and gaming industry.

Between 2010 and 2011 Atomic MPC hosted events across Australia including the 2010 Power to the PC Tour, Atomic Unlocked 2010, Revolver Sydney 2011 and Revolver Melbourne 2011.

On 12 November 2011, Atomic and Monash University’s Faculty of Information Technology presented AtomicCon 2011 at the university's Caulfield campus for technology and gaming enthusiasts. The event included presentations by Australian game publishers and suppliers of information technology equipment, and participants were able to play recently released games.

== Atomic charity ==
Since inception, Atomic and the community focussed on raising money for charity, usually the Multiple Sclerosis Society, chosen because of moderator and unofficial community organiser 'Gramyre' (Allison Reynolds) having the disease. This was achieved via auctions of various items, and a community member 'Nodnerb' (Brendon Walker) once sang I'm a Little Teapot while wearing a ballet tutu on national television for charity.
