= Handle magazine =

Australian basketball magazine

Handle Magazine was an Australian basketball magazine published in Australia. It was, along with Hoopcity, the only Australian basketball magazine being published. Handle Magazine was in circulation between 2005 and 2009.

== History and profile ==
Handle Magazine was first published in September 2005. The magazine was part of FKP Universal Exports. It was published bi-monthly. Even though it was an Australian publication it still had a few NBA articles and interviews. Brad Graham served as the editor-in-chief and art direct of the bi-monthly. Dov Kornits was the publisher of the magazine of which the last issue appeared in March 2009.
