= New Internationalist Australia =

Australian newspaper

- Formation: 15 March 1979
- Legal status: Non-profit organization
- Location: Adelaide, Australia
- Region served: Oceania
- Website: www.newint.com.au

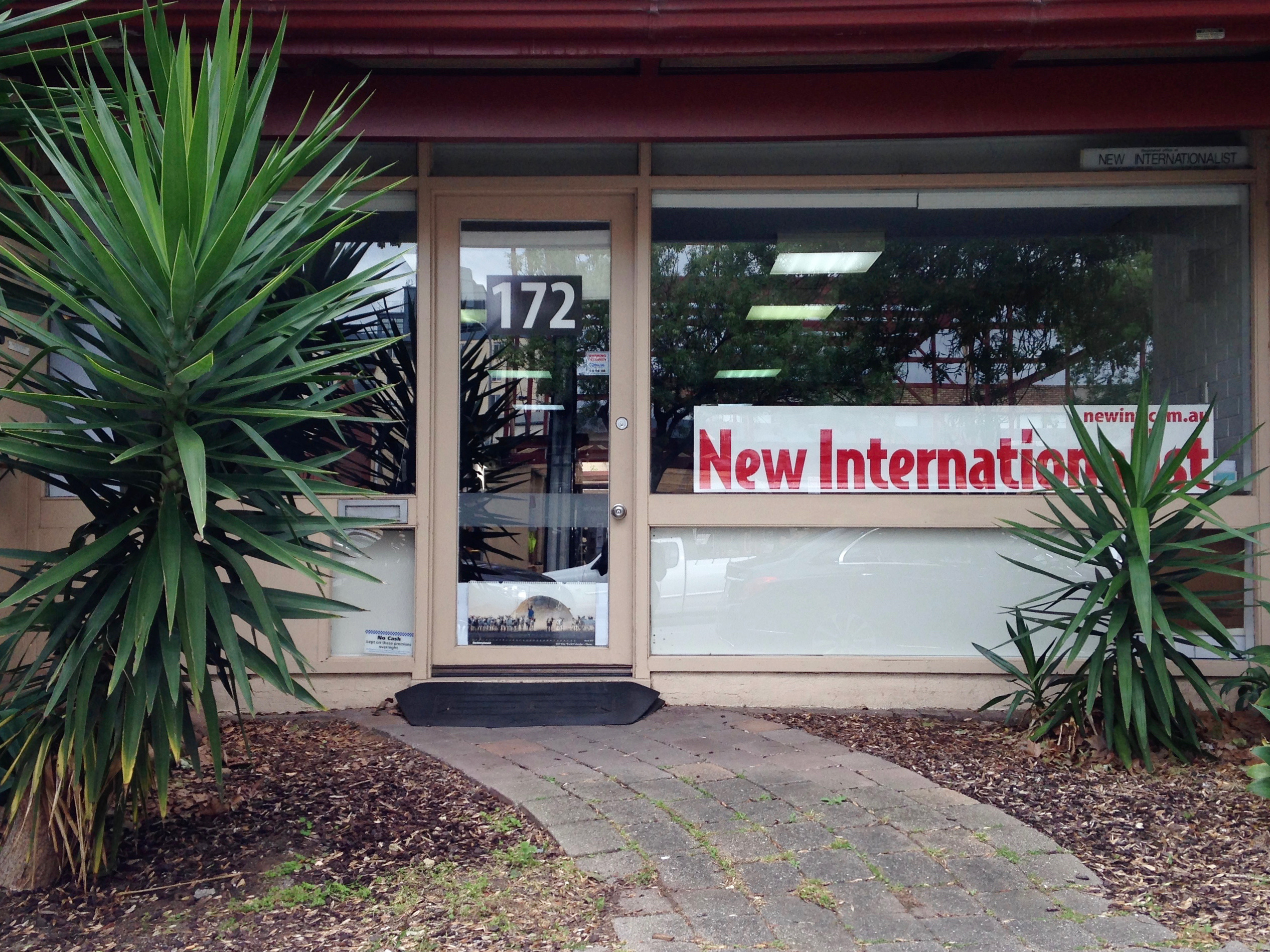
New Internationalist Australia office. 172 Gilles Street, Adelaide 5000, Australia

New Internationalist Australia was incorporated on 15 March 1979 as a completely separate company from New Internationalist, and there is no head office / branch office relationship. Originally based in Melbourne, the Adelaide office, which operates today, was set up in 1982. A full-time Australian editor was appointed between 1979 and 1982 and again between 1997 and 2002. Between 1982 and 1997 and since 2002, editorial duties in Australasia have been carried out on an ad hoc basis as required by the New Internationalist team in the UK. The UK New Internationalist was launched in Britain as a monthly magazine in 1973. Its forerunner was The Internationalist sent termly to members of the student development organization Third World First.

New Internationalist Australia is run by New Internationalist Publications, a co-operative-run publisher based in Oxford, England. The magazine also has offices in Adelaide, Australia, Christchurch, New Zealand (Aoteoroa) and Toronto, Ontario, Canada. Editorial duties are primarily carried out by the New Internationalist team based in the UK. The other offices focus primarily on marketing, sales and securing subscriptions.

In May 2009, the New Internationalist had 60,000 subscribers worldwide. The number of subscribers in Australia was 11,000.

Late 2014 saw a move of the Adelaide office from 28 Austin Street to 15 Austin Street.

== Early History 1979-86 ==
New Internationalist Australia – named New Internationalist Publications Pty Ltd (NIPPL) – was incorporated on 15 March 1979, holding its inaugural meeting the day after. It was funded by four agencies which became its shareholders: Australian Catholic Relief (ACR – now known as Caritas (charity) Australia), Asia Partnership for Human Development (APHD), Australian Council of Churches (ACC) and Community Aid Abroad (CAA – now known as Oxfam Australia).

On formation, a full-time editor was appointed, based in Melbourne. The first editor resigned after just five months. The second, Bob Hawkins, was recruited by the Australian board at the end of 1979 and edited three issues of the magazine – Elites (November 1980), Pacific Islands (produced in Papua New Guinea, July 1981) and Indonesia (October 1982).

In the period 1979–1982, there was significant tension between the New Internationalist team in the UK and the Australian Board. The tension arose because, on the one hand, the Australian Board felt that there was insufficient Australasian content in the magazine during this period whilst, on the other hand, the New Internationalist team in the UK felt that the magazine had to focus on subjects drawing on examples from all around the world rather than concentrating on particular regions. The New Internationalist team in the UK also felt that the quality of the editorial material submitted from Australia was not high enough. This tension was evident as early as 1980 when the New Internationalist team in the UK appointed Bob Hawkins as editor of the issue on Elites when he and the Australian board wanted the issue to focus on Pacific resources or Maoris.

The period of tension ended with the resignation of Bob Hawkins in 1982 and a restructuring of New Internationalist Australia carried out when Chris Sheppard from the New Internationalist team in the UK travelled to Melbourne in September of the same year. The result was that Brian Loffler of CAA Data Aid in Adelaide was appointed to the board as Joint Company Secretary and given the task of setting up the Adelaide office. At the same time, it was decided that Cameron Forbes of the Melbourne Age should be paid a retainer to undertake any editorial duties that the New Internationalist team in the UK required. This ensured that significant financial savings were made since, not only did the board not have to pay a full-time editor’s salary, but also costly airfares to the UK were reduced significantly (Bob Hawkins had frequently flown over to the UK to participate in editorial meetings with the UK team).

The restructuring of New Internationalist Australia was a success, with subscriptions to the magazine in Australia more than doubling between December 1981 (2,409) and May 1986 (5,412). In addition, from July 1983, the magazine began to be sold on news-stands. As a result of improving sales, New Internationalist Australia became financially self-sufficient in March 1984 and has remained so ever since.

== Key developments 1986–2000 ==
In 1986, Australian Catholic Relief (ACR) and the Asia Partnership for Human Development (APHD) withdrew from the board, following an issue of the magazine which focused on Sex (April 1986). These Catholic aid agencies had long had reservations about the magazine’s treatment of subjects such as family planning and homosexuality, their reservations sparked particularly by issues of the magazine on The Family (December 1982) and Feminism (August 1985).

In 1987, the non-executive directors of the company (who had held their director positions as representatives of the various founding organisations) resigned to allow the company to become a worker-run company.

In 1996, a flat salary structure was adopted. Since then, all permanent members of staff have received the same base salary, independent of the type of work being undertaken.

In 1997, Anouk Ride was appointed Australasian Editor of the New Internationalist magazine, working part-time from the Adelaide, Australia office and part-time from the Oxford, UK office. This was a significant appointment as it was the first time a full-time Australasian editor had been in place since 1982. She held the position until her resignation in December 2000.

In 1998, New Internationalist Australia was contracted by the Oxford-based New Internationalist company (NIPL) to maintain and develop the fledgling website for the international group, with a particular focus on creating an on-line archive of back issues of the magazine.

In the years which followed, New Internationalist Australia was also contracted to manage the design and production of a range of CD-ROMs on themes of global issues, international relations and international development. For example, New Internationalist Australia was contracted to produce the annual New Internationalist Archive CD-ROM, an electronic record of more than 20 years of the New Internationalist magazine.

== Key developments from 2000 ==
Since its formation, New Internationalist Australia had always been run as a not-for-profit company. In 2001, this was fully formalized through recognition by the Australian Taxation Office that New Internationalist Publications Pty Ltd (NIPPL) is a not-for-profit community service organization.

From mid-2001 until mid-2002, Chris Richards held the position of Australasian Editor. Then, from 2002 to mid-2009, Chris was retained by the Oxford-based New Internationalist company (NIPL) as an editorial consultant. She resigned in May 2009.

As part of a long-term commitment to the notion that visual representations of the globe can greatly influence perceptions, New Internationalist Australia negotiated a partnership with ODT Maps in the US in 2004. New Internationalist Australia’s role was to design and produce the DVD Many Ways to See the World that had been commissioned and written by ODT Maps.

== Digital magazine subscriptions ==
In 2013 New Internationalist Australia built its first digital magazine subscription system in Ruby on Rails. The open source project resides on GitHub.

Later in the year they successfully crowd-funded the building of a universal iPad, iPhone & iPod Touch app based on the API from the Ruby on Rails web app. In 2014 the New Internationalist magazine app was launched on the Apple App Store.

More information about the features of the app are available on the New Internationalist blog.

== Fair Trade shop ==
Between the mid-1990s and 2005, sales of educational products, sustainability-related goods and ethical gifts steadily became a significant part of New Internationalist Australia’s operations, culminating in the appointment of a dedicated Merchandising Manager in 2005, with particular responsibility to increase the Fair trade activities of New Internationalist Australia and to boost the range of goods sold through New Internationalist Australia catalogues and the on-line shop. This brought permanent staff numbers in the New Internationalist Australia office up to six.

In 2007, New Internationalist Australia became a registered Fair Trade Organization (FTO), becoming a member of the International Fair Trade Association, now known as the World Fair Trade Organization. FTOs commit themselves to a broad set of trading standards, including: paying producers a fair price, encouraging self-reliance, eliminating child labour and forced labour and supporting suppliers who produce sustainably. The Rajlakshmi Cotton Mills in India – which produce organic cotton clothing and household goods made from certified Fair Trade cotton – have become a major trading partner of New Internationalist Australia.

== New Internationalist Australia’s goals ==
The UK-based New Internationalist team describes itself as "exist[ing] to report on the issues of world poverty and inequality; to focus attention on the unjust relationship between the powerful and powerless worldwide; to debate and campaign for the radical changes necessary to meet the basic needs of all; and to bring to life the people, the ideas and the action in the fight for global justice." New Internationalist Australia fully supports these goals.

Supporters of New Internationalist Australia help New Internationalist worldwide achieve its goals in four main ways:

- Subscribing to the Australian print edition of the New Internationalist magazine.
- Subscribing to the free Australian edition of the regular email newsletter.
- Purchasing educational products, sustainability-related goods and ethical gifts from New Internationalist Australia's shop.
- Providing comments and suggestions on the New Internationalist blog.

== See also ==
- New Internationalist
