= Scoop (nickname) =

The nickname Scoop or Scoops may refer to:

- Scoops Carry (1915–1970), American jazz alto saxophonist and clarinetist
- Scoops Carey (baseball) (1870–1916), Major League Baseball first baseman
- Dick Gordon (sportswriter) (1911–2008), American sports journalist
- Henry M. Jackson (1912–1983), American senator
- Scoop Jackson (writer) (born 1963), American sports journalist and cultural critic
- Antonio Jardine (born 1988), American basketball player
- Scoop Lewry (1919–1992), Canadian politician and reporter
- Wes Nisker (1942–2023), author, radio commentator, comedian and Buddhist meditation instructor
- Art Scharein (1905–1969), American Major League Baseball third baseman
- Scoop Stanisic (born 1963), Serbian former American soccer goalkeeper and coach
- Jim Veltman (born 1966), Canadian retired lacrosse player
- Frank "Scoop" Vessels (1952–2010), American off-road truck racer
- Brian Windhorst (born 1978), American sportswriter
