= Avenewz Magazine =

Bi-monthly Australian multi-format magazine

Avenewz Magazine Australia is a bi-monthly (Indian Government) print magazine and online English magazine in Australia. The magazine consists of news about international & national, sports, immigration, real estate, technology, lifestyle, social information, Hollywood and Bollywood news to Indians, Pakistani, Sri Lankan, Bangladeshi, Myanmar, Middle Eastern, and South Asians living in Australia.

The magazine has been around since October 2010.

Avenewz Magazine originated in Perth, Western Australia and was founded by Dr. Ved Tewari, who is now associated with an Australian award-winning leading marketing, advertising & brand management company Australian Swan (www.AustralianSwan.com.au).
