= Houses (magazine) =

Australian bimonthly magazine

- Editor: Alexa Kempton
- Categories: architecture
- Frequency: bi-monthly
- Publisher: Architecture Media
- Founded: 1989
- Country: Australia
- Website: architecturemedia.com/magazines/houses/
- ISSN: 1440-3382

Houses is an Australian bimonthly magazine focused on residential architecture and design.

Architecture Media - the same publisher of Architecture Australia (the journal of the Royal Australian Institute of Architects) and Artichoke (the official magazine partner of the Design Institute of Australia for the Australian Interior Design Awards) - first published the magazine in 1989. It has the Royal Australian Institute of Architects as its co-author or contributor and is also endorsed by the Design Institute of Australia.

Houses magazine hosts the annual Houses Awards. Launched in 2020, the awards are hailed as a “prestigious” accolade recognizing the best residential works and a “celebration of Australian design ingenuity.”

Along with other entities including the City of Launceston and the Tasmanian Government, the magazine supported the Open House Launceston program in 2021. The program is one of the 40 global versions of the London event showcasing the cities’ architectural designs.
