= Your Trading Edge Magazine =

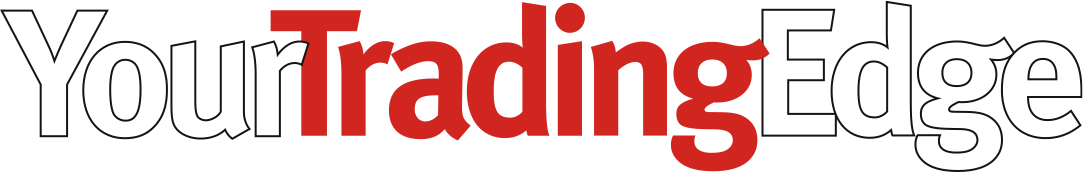
- Editor: Kritika Seksaria
- CEO: Tejal Dave
- Categories: Finance
- Frequency: Bi-monthly
- Format: Print + Digital
- Publisher: EOS Publications Pty Ltd
- Founded: 1997
- Country: Australia
- Based in: Melbourne
- Language: English
- Website: www.ytemagazine.com

Your Trading Edge Magazine is a bi-monthly magazine for traders and active investors covering CFDs, stocks, options, futures, forex and commodities.

== History ==
YourTradingEdge (YTE) began as a customer newsletter for the Sydney Futures Exchange (SFE) in 1997. SFE then began professionally publishing it as a magazine.

In early 2001, YTE was acquired by MarketSource International. Many of the former contributors re-joined the new YTE during the first year, including highly respected industry identities Michael Pascoe and Dawn Bolton-Smith.

The magazine is distributed in Australia, New Zealand, Malaysia, Singapore, Hong Kong, Brunei and Indonesia, as well as the United Kingdom.

In 2006 the title was picked up by Australia's largest newsagency chain, Newslink. It was also picked up by Qantas, Virgin Blue, Air New Zealand and Singapore Airlines for distribution in their frequent flyer lounges.

In 2010 YTE launched its first digital edition on the BeBook e-reader, then later via Exact Editions and the Apple Store.

In 2017, YTE was relaunched and acquired by EOS Publications.

== Content ==
- Technical analysis
- Fundamental commentary
- Market strategies
- Trading techniques
- Global market news
- Book & software reviews
- Trader profiles

== Ownership ==
Your Trading Edge Magazine is published by EOS Publications in Melbourne.
