= Architecture & Design =

Australian architecture magazine

- Editor: Branko Miletic
- Categories: Architecture
- Frequency: Quarterly
- Publisher: Indesign Media Asia and Pacific
- Founded: 1967
- Country: Australia
- Website: www.architectureanddesign.com.au
- ISSN: 1039-9704

Architecture & Design, also titled Architecture and Design, is a quarterly architecture magazine in Australia.

The magazine traces its roots to Building Products News, which was also called BPN whose first issue was published in 1967 by Thomson Publications. The publication was officially called BPN in 1993 under Thomson Business Publishing. In 2013, BPN was acquired by Cirrus Media, formerly called Reed Business Information, and merged with Info-link. Following the 2013 merger, the resulting periodical was then called Infolink Building Products News. In 2016, the periodical along with other assets was acquired by Architecture & Design of InDesign Media Asia and Pacific. The Architecture & Design website then became the online platform of Infolink Building Products News. In 2019, Infolink Building Products News magazine was renamed into Architecture & Design to extend its scope of coverage from “ products to include projects and people.”

Architecture & Design magazine is the host of the Sustainability Awards and Sustainability Summit. The Sustainability Awards, dubbed as a “green award,” are said to be “Australia’s longest running and most prestigious program” recognizing design and architecture sustainability achievements. Winners of the Sustainability Awards include projects of University of New South Wales, University of Technology Sydney and BVN Architecture, and Mirvac and Woods Bagot. The awards’ partners included Electrolux. Recent awarding ceremonies are held at the Sydney Cricket Ground alongside the Sustainability Summit activities held at the Sydney Football Stadium.
