= Macworld Australia =

Australian version of Macworld

- Issue 104 cover
- Editor: Jonathan Stewart
- Commercial Director: Joanne Davies
- Frequency: Monthly
- Publisher: Niche Media
- First issue: 1985
- Final issue Number: 2017; 223
- Country: Australia
- Based in: Melbourne, Australia
- Language: English
- ISSN: 2200-2375

Macworld Australia (ISSN 2200-2375) was the Australian version of the Macworld brand and magazine, carrying a combination of licensed content from the US and UK publications. It was the longest running Apple magazine outside the USA: running from 1985 (a year after the Apple Macintosh computer was introduced) to 2018.

The magazine was published under Niche Media of Melbourne, Victoria, and licensed under International Data Group (IDG). Macworld Australia's Commercial Director was Joanne Davies and Editor was Jonathan Stewart.

== History ==
=== Key dates ===
- 1985 February–March, premier issue. Headline article: "Macintosh Means Business". (ISSN 0814-9356).
- 1988.4: First issue of journal MACro : the human side Macintosh (ISSN 1032-2507), Vol.1, no.1.
- 1989 – 1994.10: publications of journal MacNews: the human face of Macintosh (ISSN 1039-2238), formerly Macro.
- 1991 – 1994.10: publications of journal Australian & New Zealand MacUser (ISSN 1037-4353), with latest issue# "vol.3, no.9".
- 1994.11 - 1997.12: incorporating MacNews and publications of journal Australian MacUser (ISSN 1322-9753), from Issue#26 to #60.
- 1998.1 - 2011.5: incorporating Australian MacUser and publications of journal Australian Macworld (ISSN 1329-9484), from Issue#1 to #159.
- 2011.6: Australian Macworld is Australia's top-selling Apple magazine. Began publications of journal Macworld Australia (ISSN 2200-2375), formerly "Australian Macworld", from Issue#160.
- 2017.7 Issue 223: the last print issue of Australian Macworld. Headline article: "The All New HomePod". It continued running with a weekly email newsletter and articles on its Web site, with digital subscriptions of the US Macworld available through Zinio.
- 2018.6 The magazine is shut down.

Macworld Australia was the longest-running Apple magazine outside the USA. It ran for 33 years – covering everything Apple since 1985.

The companion Macworld Australia web site, www.macworld.com.au, featured daily updates of both worldwide and local news, blogs, help, reviews and more. Macworld.com.au could be accessed by product type – Mac, iPhone, iPad, Play and Gadget Guide plus an App Guide section.

The October 2009 issue of Macworld Australia underwent an extensive redesign based on a reader surveys conducted in that year.

Published monthly, each issue of Macworld Australia contained features, hardware and software (app) reviews, Group Tests, tips and help, monthly competitions and more. Sections included Gadget Guide, App Guide, Mac Gems, Features, Help & Tips, Secrets, Step-by-Step, 3 of a Kind, Reviews and Group Test. The Australian content had contributors including Anthony Caruana, Danny Gorog, Adam Turner, David Braue, Keith White, David Holloway and a Mystery Writer.

Macworld Australia was distributed across the nation's newsstands and to its subscriber base. It was also available digitally on iPad, iPhone, Mac, PC and Android through Zinio and Google Plus.

== See also ==
- Macworld - for the US counterpart of Australian Macworld.
- Macworld Expo - for the annual conference and expo run by IDG (with yearly Apple appearances) of the same name.
