= Canberra Illustrated: A Quarterly Magazine =

1925 Australian magazine

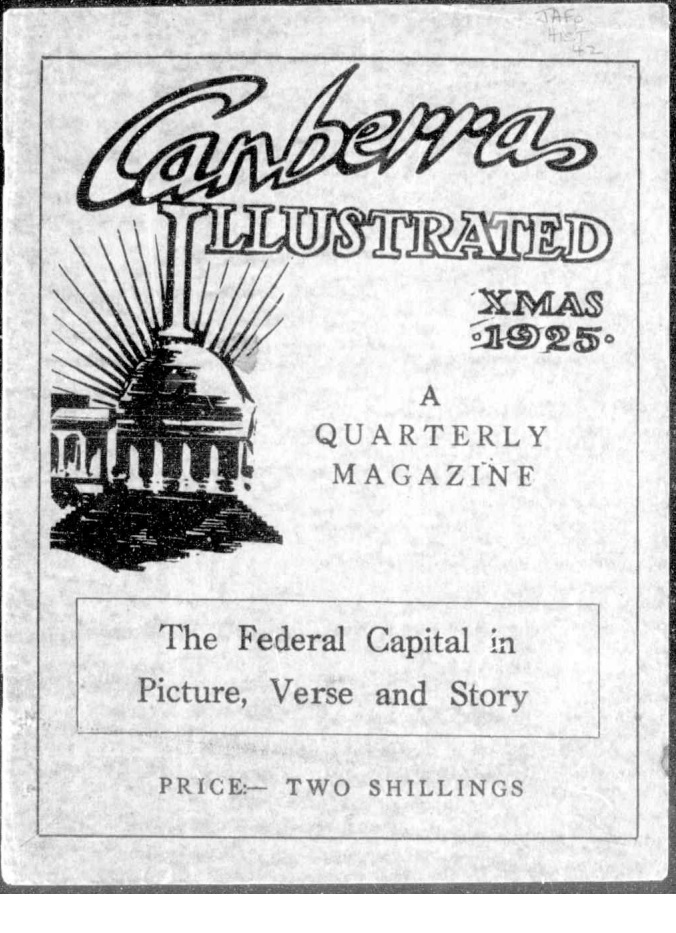
Canberra Illustrated Sunday 1 November 1925

Canberra Illustrated: A Quarterly Magazine was a magazine published once on 1 November 1925 in Canberra, Australian Capital Territory.

== History ==
The Canberra Illustrated: A Quarterly Magazine was intended as a quarterly magazine published in Canberra, Australian Capital Territory. Its only issue was the Xmas issue published in November 1925. The paper was subtitled The Federal Capital in Picture, Verse and Story. It was edited by D. Bernard O'Connor and Robert Jones and printed by New Century Press Ltd.

== Digitisation ==
The paper has been digitised as part of the Australian Newspapers Digitisation Program of the National Library of Australia.
