= Scientriffic =

Australian children's magazine

- Editor: Jasmine Fellows
- Categories: Popular science
- Frequency: Bi-monthly
- Founded: 1999
- Company: CSIRO Publishing
- Country: Australia
- Based in: Canberra
- Language: Australian English
- Website: www.csiro.au/scientriffic
- ISSN: 1442-2212
- OCLC: 173369925

Scientriffic was a bi-monthly kids science magazine published by CSIRO Publishing. It was established in 1999 as a sister publication to The Helix, CSIRO Publishing's magazine for teens. Scientriffic targeted kids aged 7 and older.

The magazine was usually 40 pages long and trimmed to quarto paper size. It typically contained feature articles about science and mathematics of interest to kids.

The magazine was relaunched in July 2015 as Double Helix, combining both Scientriffic and The Helix into one magazine, starting from Issue 1, with 8 issues per year.

== Editors ==
The final editor-in-chief was Sarah Kellett. Previous editors included Bianca Nogrady, Heather Catchpole, Cristy Burne, Tanya Patrick and Jasmine Fellows.
