= Truck & Bus Transportation =

- An issue from February 1970
- Editor: Murray Clifford (1992–1999)
- Former editors: Geoff Johnson (1978–1992); Jack Maddock (1950–1978); Frank Shennen (1936–1950)
- Categories: Transport
- Frequency: Monthly
- Publisher: Shennen Publishing
- Founder: Shennen Publishing
- First issue: July 1936
- Final issue: June 2003
- Country: Australia
- Based in: Surry Hills
- Language: Australian English
- ISSN: 0041-3380

Truck & Bus Transportation was a Sydney-based monthly trade magazine covering aspects of transport in Australia.

== Overview ==
Truck & Bus Transportation was established in July 1936 by Frank Shennen as Transportation. It was renamed Truck & Bus Transportation in March 1940. It originally covered all forms of transport, but after a short while rail and tram news was withdrawn, with it focussing on the bus and truck industries. It was sold in 1986 to the Murray family.

Shennen Publishing later founded Railway Transportation and Freight & Container Transportation that shared some content with Truck & Bus Transportation. It ceased publication in June 2003.
