= 4WD 24/7 =

Australian YouTube series

4WD 24/7 (4WD Action)
- Editor: Graham Cahill, Shaun Whale, Jock McDonald & Jesse Gleeson
- Categories: Offroad, camping
- Founded: 1998
- Country: Australia
- Based in: Sydney
- Language: English
- Website: https://www.4wd247.com/ youtube.com/c/4WD247
- ISSN: 1839-0080

4WD 24/7, previously known as 4WD Action is an Australian YouTube series that began as a print magazine. Videos are primarily focused on the four wheel driving, camping, and offroad lifestyles.

Issue 301, was released September 2019 and is the last printed edition of the magazine. The monthly magazine and accompanying DVD then ceased production, with the final issue sold as a Collector's Edition.

4WD 24/7 is also prevalent on social media, such as Facebook and Instagram.

== History and profile ==
The magazine was established in 1998 with the name 4WD Offroad Australia. It was first published on a bimonthly basis. The magazine is published seventeen times a year by Sydney-based independent publishing company Express Media Group (often shortened to EMG).

Australian 4WD Action was previously known as Australian 4WD Monthly, until a 2007 name change. The print magazine edition was the largest and most popular of its kind in Australia, with circulation figures well exceeding those of their nearest competitors.

Staff members have included Production Editor Travis Annabel, Staff Writers Dan Everett, Michael Borg and Dex Fulton, Editors at Large John Rooth (1998 -2014) and Editorial Assistant Chris Thomson.

The organization has been at the forefront of many offroad related political campaigns, including advocating for bullbar use, and preventing track closures.

== 4WD Action DVD ==
In addition to the magazine, each issue came with a packaged DVD, which is widely regarded as one of the most popular and informative offroad shows in Australia.

== See also ==
- Pat Callinan's 4x4 Adventures
- Overlanding
- Car camping
