= Transit Australia =

Sydney based transport magazine

- Editor: Tony Bailey
- Categories: Public transport
- Frequency: Monthly
- Publisher: Australia Electric Traction Association
- First issue: 1946
- Final issue: June 2018
- Country: Australia
- Based in: Sydney
- Language: Australian English
- Website: www.transitaustralia.com.au
- ISSN: 0818-5204

Transit Australia was a Sydney based monthly magazine covering public transport in Australia and New Zealand. It was the in-house journal of the Australia Electric Traction Association. It was founded in 1946 as Tram Tracks, being retitled Electric Traction in 1949 and Transit Australia in 1987. The final issue was published in June 2018.
