= New Philosopher =

- The cover of first issue of New Philosopher.
- Editor: Zan Boag
- Categories: Philosophy, Society, Culture, Art, Literature
- Frequency: Quarterly
- Publisher: Poet Press
- Founded: 2013
- Country: Worldwide
- Based in: Hobart, Australia
- Language: English, Korean, Arabic, Chinese
- Website: newphilosopher.com
- ISSN: 2201-7151

New Philosopher is an ad-free newsstand philosophy magazine distributed throughout the United States, Canada, the UK, Australia, Europe, Asia, and New Zealand, and produced by the team behind the magazine Womankind. Both publications were co-founded and are edited by Zan Boag and Antonia Case.

== History and profile ==
New Philosopher launched in Australia in 2013 at the Byron Bay Writers Festival, where it was the bestselling item at the festival and number 6 at the festival the following year. According to the University of Sydney, it launched with distribution "across 2,000 news agencies in Australia and New Zealand and circulation in book shops, airports, cafes, delis, art galleries, boutiques and museums." According to posts on Facebook, as of 2015 New Philosopher was the most widely distributed philosophy magazine in the world, with more than 10,000 stockists globally. Each edition is set around a philosophical theme and features articles from and interviews with leading intellectuals.

== Contributors ==
The magazine includes writing from prominent intellectuals such as philosophers Peter Singer, Clive Hamilton, Angie Hobbs, Robert W. McChesney, Massimo Pigliucci, Nigel Warburton, and Howard Gardner; Booker Prize winners DBC Pierre and Peter Carey; award-winning British novelist and essayist Will Self and Pulitzer Prize finalist Nicholas G. Carr; Australian cartoonist and Australian Living Treasure Michael Leunig; and five winners of the Australasian Association of Philosophy Media Prize: philosophers Damon Young, Patrick Stokes, Matthew Beard, Russell Blackford, and Paul Biegler. The magazine's literary editor Antonia Case, who is also the editor of Womankind, won the Australasian Association of Philosophy Media Professionals' Award in 2014; New Philosopher's editor-in-chief Zan Boag won the same award in 2017.

== Joint edition with The New York Times ==
In February 2019, a special joint edition 'Being Human' was produced between New Philosopher and The New York Times, which saw New York Times contributors such as Martha Nussbaum, Ai Weiwei, Bernard-Henri Lévy, Pico Iyer, Dan Ariely, Anne Wojcicki, Sherry Turkle, and Simon Critchley appear alongside regular contributors to New Philosopher.

== Interviewees ==
Many prominent thinkers have been interviewed in the magazine, including Noam Chomsky, Daniel Dennett, Thomas Piketty, Jane Goodall, Carlo Rovelli, Ricky Gervais, John Searle, Peter Singer, Anita L. Allen, Leo Braudy, Luciano Floridi, David Wood, David Chalmers, and Gregg Caruso.

== Awards and recognition ==
Described by the editor Zan Boag in an interview with MagCulture as being a magazine "as much about art and design as it is about philosophy", the magazine has received recognition around the world for its design and editorial content. In December 2019 it was named overall 'Magazine of the Decade' by Stack Magazines after being named earlier as News/Current Affairs Magazine of the Decade.

It was shortlisted for Best Use of Illustration in The Stack Awards 2016 and in 2017; shortlisted for Editor of the Year and Best Original Non-Fiction in The Stack Awards in 2017; it was shortlisted in the World Illustration Awards 2016; and the cover of the "happiness" edition was voted one of the coolest covers of February 2014 by Complex. Design website Abuzeedo commented that "the design is super cool and out of the box" and the American Institute of Graphic Arts (AIGA) featured the magazine, referring to it as a "very popular... ad-free publication that has become a favorite amongst readers in its home country...", a publication that takes "an approachable yet still thoughtful and intelligent tone". The director of magazine website Magpile says "the design is calm, intelligent and very neat" and "if I needed to use just one word to sum up new Aussie magazine, New Philosopher, it would be 'smart'.” It was named one of top magazines launched for 2014 (in the US) by the Library Journal and New York Post listed it as one of six "magazines that will get you thinking", writing that it "feels like a coffee table book with beautiful pictures and large, double-spaced font".

== Foreign language editions ==
In 2017 a Korean edition was launched via AMO Agency with the publisher, Bada, printing "more than 5,000 copies" - readers are predominately "Koreans in their 20s and 30s". The Korean Editor Jang Dong-seok said, “I thought that there might not be a clear-cut readership for our magazine, but surprisingly young people were interested in humanities and philosophy.” He added, “Until now, humanities and philosophy were for those boring people who always recited big words, but our readers are responding to the appeal of the ‘philosophy of daily life’.” A digital edition is available on Air France and KLM flights and lounges.

In October 2019 it was announced via the Saudi Press Agency that leading Arabic philosophy website Mana.net would translate and publish articles from New Philosopher online immediately and published first printed Arabic edition in early 2020.

== Other activities ==
New Philosopher runs and curates the bookstore 'poet store' in Hobart, Australia, hosts the philosophy café 'New Philosopher' and announced in 2019 that it will open a philosophical art gallery called GAAP (Gallery of Art And Philosopher) in Hobart in 2020, with New Philosopher's editor Zan Boag stating that the purpose of launching the gallery was because “art that reflects the philosophical tensions of our time can help us make better sense of our world, our place in it, and where we are heading. Art awakens the senses and forces us to reconsider how we perceive the world, much like philosophy does.”

In 2024, New Philosopher produced an art exhibition in collaboration with the Saudi International Philosophy Conference in Riyadh, where the art of New Philosopher was on display in major exhibition at the King Fahad National Library in Riyadh, Saudi Arabia.
