= Scoop (journalism magazine) =

Scoop is a quarterly magazine published in Perth, Western Australia for current members of the Australian Journalists Association. It is the most recent journal/annual that the long lasting branch of the Western Australian district or branch has produced.

It is currently published by the Australian Journalists Association (AJA) section in Western Australia of the Media, Entertainment and Arts Alliance union.

== Earlier publications ==
It was preceded by The Midnight bawl in the 1940s and 1950s – Scribe was around in the 1970s – with the Annuals from the 1960s through to its inception in the 1980s. The earlier volumes of Scoop did reflect back into earlier eras of the AJA WA.

== Current subscribers ==
Journalists form a large portion of the AJA section's membership, Scoop also reports on issues that affect sub-editors, photographers, freelance journalists, broadcasters, graphic designers, TV camera operators, public relations workers, and writers.

Scoop currently runs "It Says Here", the work of cartoonist Shaun Salmon. Irregular features include Lord Copper, who writes about journalism style, Papped, a showcase of a photographer member's work, and Bloopers, errors from the media.

== Publication details ==
- ISSN 0819-4513 – February 1987

== Earlier publications of the WA AJA ==
- Australian Journalists' Association. W.A. The Midnight bawl. 8 July 1946 – 6 Sep 1954. Annual.
- Australian Journalists' Association. W.A. District .Scribe : official journal of the W.A. District A.J.A. v. 1, no. 2 (1963:June) ? – v. 7, no. 1 (1976:June)
- Australian Journalists' Association. Western Australian District. Annual report and balance sheet.1959/60-1984/85. Annual
