= Belle (magazine) =

Australian design magazine

Belle is an Australian design magazine, covering interior design and architecture as well as a raft of other home improvement content.

== History and profile ==
Belle was started in 1974. The magazine was purchased by the Bauer Media Group as part of their acquisition of the Australian Consolidated Press. It was published on a bi-monthly basis until 2014 when its frequency was changed to eight times a year. The headquarters is in Sydney.

Neale Whitaker served as the editor-in-chief of the magazine. In December 2014 Tanya Buchanan was named editor-in-chief of Belle.

The circulation of Belle was 45,230 copies from January to June 2014.

Since 2020, Belle magazine has been owned by Are Media, which acquired Bauer Media's Australian assets.
