= PC PowerPlay =

Australian video game magazine

- Cover of issue 303
- Editor: Ben Mansill
- Categories: PC gaming
- Frequency: Monthly or bi-monthly
- Circulation: 14,527
- First issue: May 1996
- Final issue Number: 8 September 2025; Issue #311
- Company: Future Australia
- Country: Australia
- Based in: Strawberry Hills, New South Wales
- Website: Official website (no longer updated as of 2018)
- ISSN: 1326-5644

PC PowerPlay (PCPP) was Australia's only dedicated PC games magazine. PC PowerPlay focused on news and reviews for upcoming and newly released games on the Microsoft Windows platform. The magazine also reviewed computer hardware for use on gaming computers. The magazine was published by Next Publishing Pty Ltd from 1996 to 2018 when it was transferred to Future Australia.

In 2018, Future, owner and publisher of PC Gamer, purchased PC PowerPlay and related computing titles from nextmedia, incorporating PC PowerPlay articles into the online versions of PC Gamer. In September 2025, the magazine released its final issue.

While no physical media was included in the last few years, for most of the life of the magazine it included either a CD or DVD that featured game demos, freeware games, anime shows, film/anime/game teaser trailers, game patches, game mods, game maps, PC utilities and computer wallpapers. These were useful in an era of poor internet connection for most of Australia.

== Main sections ==
The main sections included in each month's magazine included letters to the editor, previews, reviews, feature articles, artwork, pictures of computers owned by readers, flashbacks to old games, lists of PC builds to help people purchase new products and advertising. There are also various opinion and comedic sections such as "Dr. Claw" and "Yellow Boots".

== Scoring system ==
In early issues, reviews of games and products assigned a score out of ten. PC PowerPlay gave 10/10 scores to a number of games, including:

- Psychonauts
- Civilization IV
- Half-Life 2: Episode One
- Medieval II: Total War
- BioShock
- Crysis
- The Witcher: Enhanced Edition
- Far Cry 2
- The Fallout Collection (Featured in the "Bargain Bin" section.)
- Mass Effect 2
- Assassin's Creed: Brotherhood
- Minecraft
- The Elder Scrolls V: Skyrim
- Wolfenstein 3D (retroactively via a re-release in 1998 since the game was originally released prior to PC PowerPlay's first issue; this was presented as a 'Special retro scoring system' as the magazine had since moved to percentage review scores)

A 10/10 game was connoted not as a perfect game but as a "masterpiece with flaws".

By issue 7, the magazine had switched to a percentage rating system and retained this until its final issue. No game was assessed at 100%; the highest score of 98% was given to:

- Deus Ex
- Falcon 4.0
- Half-Life
- System Shock 2
- Total Annihilation
- Unreal

The lowest score given to a game by PC PowerPlay was Mindscape's Howzat World Cricket Quest. It was given a score of 2% in March 1998.

== Website & forum ==
In addition to the magazine itself, there were several websites that are closely linked with it. The official PC PowerPlay website was launched in 2001, but was taken offline following the collapse of the online division of publishing company Next Media, then lay dormant until July 2006.

While it had a typical frontpage with online articles, most of the traffic went to the PC PowerPlay forums. The forum database had been preserved across a number of technology migrations. It first began on a ColdFusion powered site in 2001, then moved to phpBB and was converted to vBulletin in 2007. It was one of the largest Australian specific online forums while it existed. The forums provided discussion of gaming and computer related software and technology. There were also "off-topic" sections dedicated to general discussion and banter, serious discussions regarding Australian national, regional and international issues and a section for discussions of TV shows, films and music. This design also allows the organisation of multiplayer games amongst the PCPP readers and other forum members. The general discussion section of the PCPP Forum was titled "Rhubarb" because of editor Anthony Fordham's love of the old British joke of having extras in movie crowd scenes say "rhubarbrhubarbrhubarb" to simulate incidental conversation.

A website re-launch occurred on 22 April 2009, consisting of a customised Joomla install and layout, and an intention to regularly updated blogs, news articles and major features, although it quickly fell back into the same problems with contributors not updating the news sections, leaving the forum to continue as the only regularly updated section.

On Wednesday, 12 March 2010, the PCPP website and forum software was replaced with a CMS provided by CyberGamer. This software also powers the cybergamer.com.au website. PCPP is now listed as a "Media Partner" of CyberGamer whilst CyberGamer now receives advertising space within PCPP and PCPP's sister magazine, Hyper. A press release was issued on 18 March, detailing the arrangement between both parties. As part of this online merger, PCPP's established community were incorporated within the CyberGamer Network.

The forum was eventually closed in December 2017 as costs to run the server and the dwindling userbase made it uneconomical to continue. The frontpage was redirected to a PC Gamer website for the magazines writers to update, but ceased updating articles in 2018.

== CD-ROM version, DVD-ROM version and disc-less version ==
The magazine launched in 1996 with a 640 Megabyte CD-ROM cover disc, which was upgraded to a double CD-ROM set in January 2000 issue. The DVD-ROM edition joined the line-up in April 2002 issue alongside the CD-ROM version for three years, the CD-ROM version finally ceased production in 2005.

The August 1998 cover disc of PC PowerPlay was infected with the Marburg virus, causing the magazine to apologise in the following issue and give away antivirus software from Kaspersky Lab. Marburg was also spread by a PC Gamer cover disc and WarGames: Defcon 1 in the same year, which CNN Money stated caused the malware to become a "widespread threat".

From April to December 2002 the DVD-ROM edition of PC PowerPlay also contained one episode of an Anime show that was licensed and distributed in Australia by Madman Entertainment such as Boogiepop Phantom, Love Hina, Mobile Suit Gundam Wing, and Sorcerous Stabber Orphen.

The November 2005 edition included the first discless magazine at a little over half the price of the DVD-ROM version. While sales were not spectacular, dropping the CD-ROM did slow the rate of decline of the non-DVD-ROM version of the magazine. This saw subscriptions being offered for the disc-less version at half the sale price.

The Bunker was a section of the DVD-ROM originally compiled each month by "ROM", a respected member of the PCPP online community. However, following his retirement from the position (announced in issue #143), The Bunker undertook a drastic transformation and became the PCPP Community Bunker. Readers and members of the online community produced and were actively encouraged to submit to the section.

The Bunker was replaced in 2009 with a streamlined Applications and Utilities section.

== Competition ==
Australian publishing company Derwent Howard launched a competitor called PC Games Addict in 2002, using some Australian content filled out by licensed content from PC Gamer in the UK and PC Format. The magazine ceased publication in 2005, leaving PC PowerPlay with no direct competition in the Australian market for PC games magazines. There was indirect competition from technology enthusiast magazines such as Atomic and FamilyPC Australia. There were also imported magazines from the UK and US such as PC Gamer and PC Zone but their circulations were minimal in comparison to the local products. An Australian version of PC Gamer launched shortly after PC PowerPlay but was shut down in 1999 following a dispute between the publisher and printer.

== Closure ==
In September 2025 after almost 3 decades of publication the final issue #311 was released. The issue featured normal content such as reviews and previews of upcoming games and hardware but also included several retrospective articles by the editor and many long time staff.

Subscribers of the magazine received included with issue #311 a personalised letter from the editor Ben Mansill titled 'Dear <name>' letting them know that it would be the last issue and the remainder of their subscription had been transferred to another Future Australia magazine APC.

== See also ==
- Hyper
