= Football Budget (Western Australia) =

- Editor: WA Football Commission
- Former editors: Tracey Lewis (2010-2019), Brad Elborough (2008-2009), Stuart McLea (2005–2007), Tracey Searle (2000–2004) Glenn Quartermain (1998–99), Alan East (1974–1997), Alan Duke Ferguson (1951–1972), Claude Vivian Woodbridge Morris (1942–1948)
- Staff writers: Sean Cowan
- Categories: Sports
- Frequency: Weekly during season
- Publisher: WA Football Commission
- Founder: McMahons
- First issue: 1921
- Country: Australia
- Based in: Perth, Western Australia
- Language: English

The Football Budget is the match-day program of the West Australian Football League (WAFL). The magazine is currently distributed free with all purchased match-day tickets, but is also available for sale for $3.

== Format ==
The Budget covers news relating to Western Australian football generally, but is focused on the WAFL with names and numbers of participating players listed for all WAFL and Western Australian Australian Football League matches.

== History ==
The Football Budget was first produced as McMahons WA Footballer in 1921, soon becoming known just as the WA Footballer. The magazine was rebranded in 1936 as the Football Budget after the South Australian equivalent of the same name. In 1997, it was again rebranded, this time as Real Footy, to fit with the competition's change of name from the WAFL to Westar Rules. 1999 saw the program's name change to Football WA for a season, before another change to Football 2000 the following season. The competition name reverted to the West Australian Football League in 2001, prompting the program to also revert to its old name, the Football Budget.

The publication was started by South Australian company McMahon's Agency, which was a printing and newsagency business. Frederick Crease was sent to Perth to manage its day-to-day affairs, while Ernest Grow was hired to sell advertising. The program cost threepence in that first year, which was soured by the fraud perpetrated on the company by Grow. He was convicted of fraud for claiming to have sold advertising space to non-existent companies, for which he was paid a commission.

In 1993, the format of the publication was changed to make it an A4 magazine. Publisher Wright Media was given the rights to publish the Football Budget in 1998, increasing the size of the publication again mid-way through the 2006 season to one more reminiscent of foolscap. Media Tonic eventually bought out Wright Media before the 2008 season and continued publishing the program until the end of the 2019 season.

Media Tonic handed control of the Football Budget back to the WA Football Commission. The WAFC continued to publish the Football Budget during the COVID-interrupted 2020 season, including the long-running 'WAFL Collectables' column by journalist and collector Sean Cowan, but reduced the size of the publication back to A5.
