= World Wide Country Tours =

World Wide Country Tours (WWCT) was a guided tour company founded by publishing icon Roy Reiman in 1972, and it served as the exclusive tour operator for and part of the Reader's Digest Association family of companies until its closing in 2012. The company was headquartered in Greendale, Wisconsin, along with the publishing offices of thirteen magazines, including Taste of Home, Birds & Blooms and Country.

== Overview ==
Agritourism, which brings visitors to a farm or ranch, was an integral component of World Wide Country Tours itineraries. Reiman's first tours brought farmers to Hawaii for educational visits and seminars. The company expanded to Alaska, international destinations and then to North American tours. The tour itineraries often emphasized visiting local farms, orchards, fisheries, and crafts businesses, in addition to more conventional tourist destinations.

In 1995, Nebraska Educational Telecommunications's "Statewide" program featured World Wide Country Tours' visits to northeastern Nebraska farmers in their "Ag Tourism" article, broadcast April 30, 2005, and March 17, 2006. The company operated tours to over 40 destinations and maintained a strong customer satisfaction rate, with 98% of its travelers indicating they would travel with the company again.

== Present ==
When the business was closed by its parent company in January 2012, the slack was quickly picked up by former staffers in a newly created company, Country Travel DISCOVERIES. Led by Steve Uelner, who had served as WWCT's Director for over 25 years, Country Travel DISCOVERIES has continued to offer a similar type and quality of "off-the-beaten-path" tours focused on rural settings and the country lifestyle that travelers had experienced and learned to expect from World Wide Country Tours. Continuity with the World Wide Country Tours legacy can be seen in the tours, past WWCT traveler testimonials, and letter by Roy Reiman on Country Travel DISCOVERIES' website as well as in its partnership with new magazines published by Reiman, including Our Iowa Magazine and Our Wisconsin.

== See also ==
- Caravan Tours
- Group Voyagers
