= Thomas O. Ryder =

American Businessman

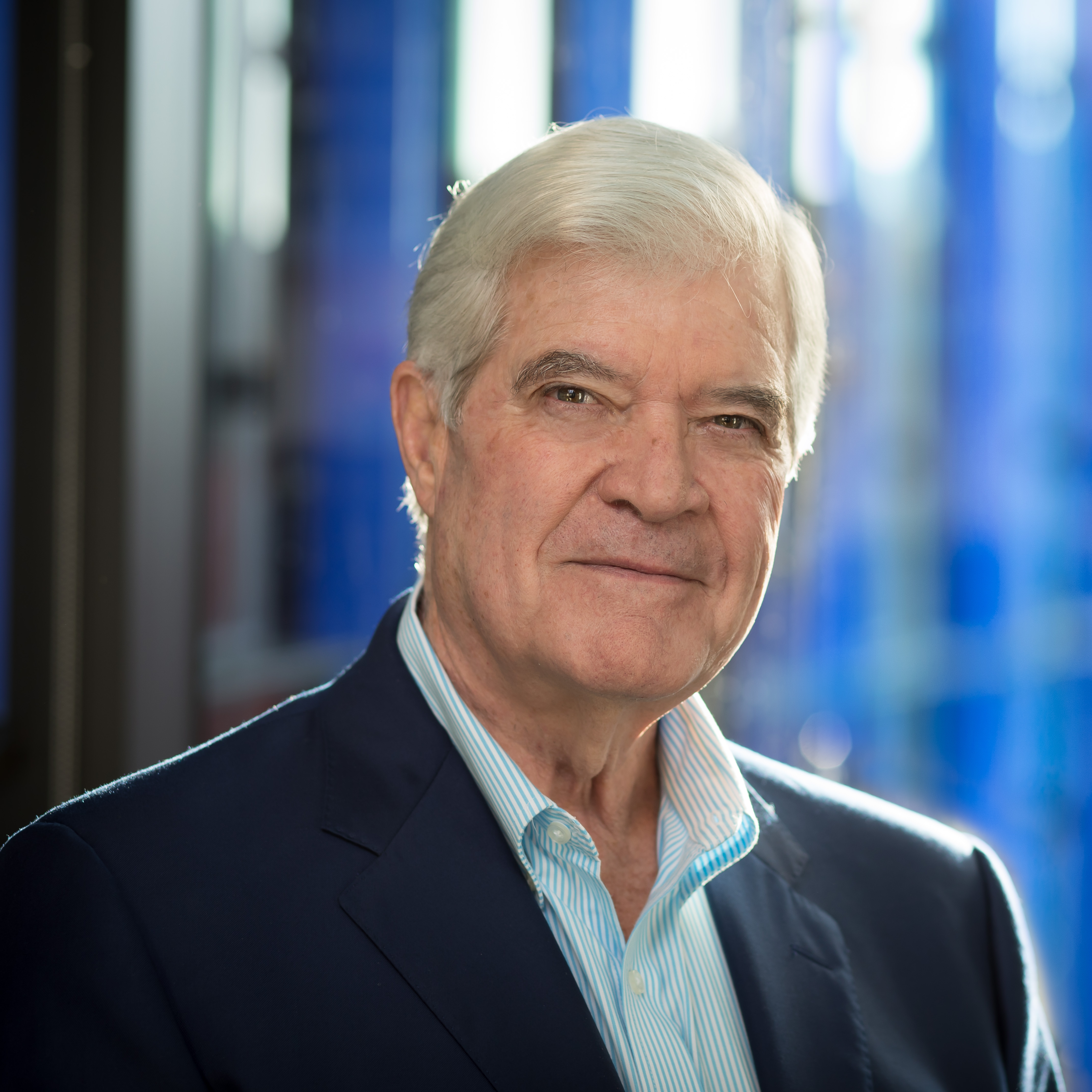
- Ryder in 2020
- Born: 1944 (age 81–82); South Carolina, U.S.
- Education: Louisiana State University
- Occupation: Businessperson
- Known for: Board member at Amazon, Former chairman and CEO, Reader's Digest Association

Thomas O. Ryder (born c. 1944) is an American businessman, investor and corporate board member who has had a long career in the publishing and financial services industries and is an accomplished contributor to the food and wine industries. He currently serves on the board of directors of Amazon.

== Education and early career ==
Ryder was born in Varnville, SC, but was raised in Alexandria, LA. where he attended public schools.

Ryder received a Bachelor of Arts degree in journalism from Louisiana State University in 1966.

After graduating from Louisiana State University in 1966, he was hired as a publishing trainee at Time Inc. and in 1968 became a publishing executive at Xerox Education Publications. In 1972, he joined Vincent Drucker and Frank McCulloch as the founding executive team in Education Today Co. Inc. in Palo Alto, CA. The company published magazines and books for teachers and parents, including Learning and The Magazine for Creative Teaching. Ryder was president of the company and a member of the board of directors. From 1980 until May 1984 Ryder was senior vice president of CBS Magazines.

== Career ==
=== American Express ===
Ryder served as the president of American Express Travel Related Services International, a division of American Express Company from October 1995 to April 1998.

He had been president of American Express Merchant-Related Services World Wide and had joined the company as president of American Express Publishing World Wide in May 1984.

=== Reader's Digest Association ===
Ryder served as the chairman and chief executive officer at The Reader's Digest Association, Inc. from April 1998 to December 2005 and served as its chairman of the board from April 1998 to March 2007. Ryder retired from RDA when the company was sold to a private equity firm.

The Reader's Digest Association, Inc. (RDA), a global media and direct marketing company, is best known for its flagship publication founded in 1922, Reader's Digest. The company was founded by husband and wife DeWitt and Lila Bell Wallace in 1922 with the first publication of Reader's Digest magazine, but grew to include a diverse range of magazines, books, music, DVDs and online content. As chairman and CEO of the company that published the world's most widely read magazine, Reader's Digest, Ryder was responsible for a total global circulation of almost 40 million and well over 100 million readers in 60+ countries, with company sales of nearly $2.5 billion.

In 2002, the company purchased Reiman Publications, based in Greendale, Wisconsin, from Madison Dearborn Partners. Reiman Publications published Taste of Home, Healthy Cooking, Simple and Delicious, Birds & Blooms, Country, Country Woman, Farm and Ranch Living and Reminisce. It was one of the largest magazine publishing acquisitions in U.S. history.

In March 2007, after being publicly traded for 15 years, Reader's Digest Association was acquired by an investor group led by Ripplewood Holdings, a private equity firm.

On September 28, 2015, it was announced that the company's name was officially changed from "Reader's Digest Association" to "Trusted Media Brands, Inc."

=== Food and Wine Industry ===
Food and wine were long-time hobbies for Ryder and he made it part of his career. He bought Cuisine Magazine while working at CBS and then bought Food & Wine Magazine while at American Express. As part of a plan to revitalize Food & Wine, Ryder created the Aspen Food & Wine Classic, a festival which became a great success and inspired dozens of imitators around the world. In January 1984 American Express Europe launched Departures magazine as an exclusive cardmember benefit. In 1989 control passed to American Express Publishing.

While at Reader's Digest Association, Ryder was responsible for the acquisition of Allrecipes.com and Taste of Home, the latter part of the home-cook publishing pioneer Reiman Publishing of Wisconsin. He also oversaw the creation of Every Day With Rachael Ray Magazine, one of the most successful magazine launches in recent history.

Ryder began collecting wines while in college and ultimately created one of the great collections in the US, much of which was sold at a rare, single-seller sale at Sotheby's in 2007. The proceeds funded a family foundation which in its early days benefited a number of Louisiana organizations helping the state recover from Hurricane Katrina.

He invested in a number of restaurant start-ups, in Connecticut with his son, and in New York, with Danny Meyer’s Union Square Hospitality Group, where he was an early investor in Shake Shack among other brands. Ryder has also written extensively about food and wine in publications such as Travel & Leisure, Food & Wine, Reader's Digest, Barron's, Huffington Post and The Daily Meal. He had plans to open a gourmet market in Vero Beach, FL in 2020.

== Boards and Chairmanships ==
- Since 2002, Ryder has served on the board of directors of Amazon . He was named the company's first lead independent director and now serves as the chairman of the audit committee.
- Ryder was an independent director at Starwood Hotels & Resorts Worldwide, Inc. since April 2001 until Marriott acquired Starwood in 2016. He served on the capital and compensation committees as well as the governance committee and was chairman of the audit committee.
- He served on RPX Corp., since 2009, and was the company's lead independent director and the former audit chairman. He was on the compensation committee and was nominating chairman.
- Ryder was on the board of Quad Graphics from 2010 until retiring in 2017. He served on the audit committee.

== Former boards ==
- Chief executive officer of The Reader's Digest Association Inc. from April 1998 to December 2005. Chairman of the board from April 1998 to March 2007, when the company was sold to a private equity firm.
- Virgin Mobile USA (NYSE) from 2006 to 2009; and was chairman of the board; audit committee chairman, and a member of the compensation committee. The company was acquired by Sprint-Nextel in July 2009.
- World Color Press (private) from 2008 to 2010 and was lead independent director and a member of the audit committee. The company was acquired by Quad Graphics in July 2010.
- Startek Corporation(NYSE) from 1996 to 2000 and was chairman of the audit committee.
- Education Today Company, Inc. (Private) from 1972 to 1980, where he was CEO and co-founder.
- Club Mediterranee
- American Express International Bank

== Recognition ==
- Ryder was chairman of the board of the MPA—The Association of Magazine Media and was given The Henry Johnson Fisher Award in 2007 for lifetime achievement in magazine publishing.
- Ryder received an honorary doctor of humane letters from Southern Connecticut State University on May 27, 2010.
- Ryder was inducted into the LSU Alumni Hall of Fame in 1993 and, in 1987, the LSU Manship School of Mass Communication Hall of Fame.
