= Roy Reiman =

American magazine publisher

Roy J. Reiman
- Born: May 16, 1934
- Died: September 16, 2024 (aged 90)
- Spouse: Roberta Reiman

Roy J. Reiman (May 16, 1934 – September 16, 2024) was an American publisher and philanthropist who was the founder of Reiman Publications based in Greendale, Wisconsin, which is best known for its country-oriented magazines, books, and other home products. Reiman is credited with building the country's largest, private, subscription-based publishing company. In 2003, it was reported that one out of every eight households in the United States subscribed to a Reiman magazine. He was named publisher of the year in 1991 by Magazine Weekly and Wisconsin's Master Entrepreneur in 1992. Reiman Publications, now affiliated with the Reader's Digest Corporation, currently publishes thirteen national consumer magazines, including Taste of Home, the most popular cooking magazine worldwide.

== Early life and career ==
Roy Reiman was born May 16, 1934, and grew up on a farm near Auburn, Iowa. He graduated from Auburn High School in 1952. He worked in a creamery to pay for his college tuition. Reiman graduated from Iowa State University in 1957 with a degree in agricultural journalism. His first publishing job was for the farming journal Capper’s Farmer, where he became managing editor at the age of 23. This magazine went out of business after John Deere pulled its advertising and other companies followed suit. Reiman then worked for three more years at Agricultural Publishers in Milwaukee, which allowed him to save money.

His first magazine, Pepperette, a magazine aimed at teenaged cheerleaders, band, and pep-squad members, failed after only two issues. Reiman did have some success with the publication of Farm Building News. He officially started Reiman Publications in 1965 in the basement of his Hales Corners, Wisconsin home.

== Farm and lifestyle magazines ==
In the 1970s, Reiman noticed that traditional farm magazines were eliminating their women's sections. According to Reiman “I wondered what was going to happen to all those women like my mother, who were the ones who really read those magazines. I figured they still wanted to read something.” This led to the birth of Farm Wife News. For the initial test issue, Reiman created a 16-page magazine with articles on everything from recipes to gardening tips. He made 40,000 copies of the issue and mailed them to farm families at a cost of $20,000. 16,000 of the readers sent back payments for a year's subscription. Eventually, after sending more promotional copies to additional farm families, Reiman had an initial subscription base of over 80,000.

Eighty percent of the content of Roy Reiman's magazines were written by his readers, through submitted articles and photos and, until 2007, there was no advertising. All magazines were 68-page bi-monthlies. Farm Wife News was revamped in 1987 to focus on rural lifestyles and was renamed Country Woman. In 1978, Reiman launched Farm & Ranch Living because he noticed that most farm magazines had turned into little more than technical manuals. According to Reiman, “When I grew up on a farm, farm magazines were fun to read. They had cartoons, things that you enjoyed reading. I figured there had to be farmers who still wanted that.” A rural-living lifestyle magazine, Country, began publication in 1987. A sister publication to Country, Country EXTRA, began in 1991. In 1991, Reiman launched Reminisce, a nostalgic collection of stories and pictures, submitted by readers, from the earlier decades of the 1900s. A sister publication to Reminisce, Reminisce EXTRA, started in 1993. Birds & Blooms, started in 1995. A sister publication to Birds & Blooms, Birds & Blooms EXTRA, started in 2005. A travel magazine called Country Discoveries was announced in December 1999. It ceased publication in July/August 2006. A home-style crafting magazine called Crafting Traditions was sold in 2004.

== Cooking magazines ==
In 1993, Reiman branched out into cooking magazines with the birth of Taste of Home. This magazine utilized the same philosophy of reader-contributed content as his farming magazines. Taste of Home is currently the largest food magazine worldwide. The success of Taste of Home has led to other popular titles including, Light & Tasty (2001), Cooking for 2 (2005), and Taste of Home’s Simple & Delicious (2006). The popularity of the cooking magazines led to the creation of Taste of Home Books, which publishes annual collections of the recipes from each magazine.

Other divisions of Reiman Media Group include Country Store, a mail order division (founded in 1975), World Wide Country Tours, LLC (1980, closed in January 2012) offering dozens of different domestic and foreign tours, and Homemaker Schools (a 50-year-old company acquired in 1995) hosts locally sponsored Taste of Home Cooking Schools coast to coast.

== Retirement and death ==
In 1998 Roy Reiman sold his majority interest in Reiman Publications to Madison Dearborn Partners, a Chicago investment firm, for $640 million. Reiman sold his remaining interest in 2002 to the Reader's Digest Association. Roy continued with Reiman Media Group until November 2005. In June 2007, Reiman Publications officially lost its name under a reorganization of the company.

Reiman continued to be active with his alma mater, Iowa State University. In 2003, he and his wife Bobbi were given the Impact Award from the university for their activities within the school, including the creation of the Reiman Gardens and the Christina Reiman Butterfly Wing. Additionally, Roy Reiman was a past president of the Iowa State University Alumni Association Board of Directors, an ISU Foundation Governor, an Order of The Knoll Campanile Award recipient, and an ISU Foundation Philanthropy Award recipient. Bobbi Reiman is an Order of The Knoll Campanile Award recipient, ISU Foundation Philanthropy Award recipient, and a member of the University Museums Curators Associates. The Reimans were life members of the ISU Alumni Association. An entrepreneurial scholars and lectures program in the College of Business also bears Roy and Bobbi Reiman's names.

Reiman died on September 16, 2024, at the age of 90.
