= Aldo Carrascoso =

Filipino entrepreneur

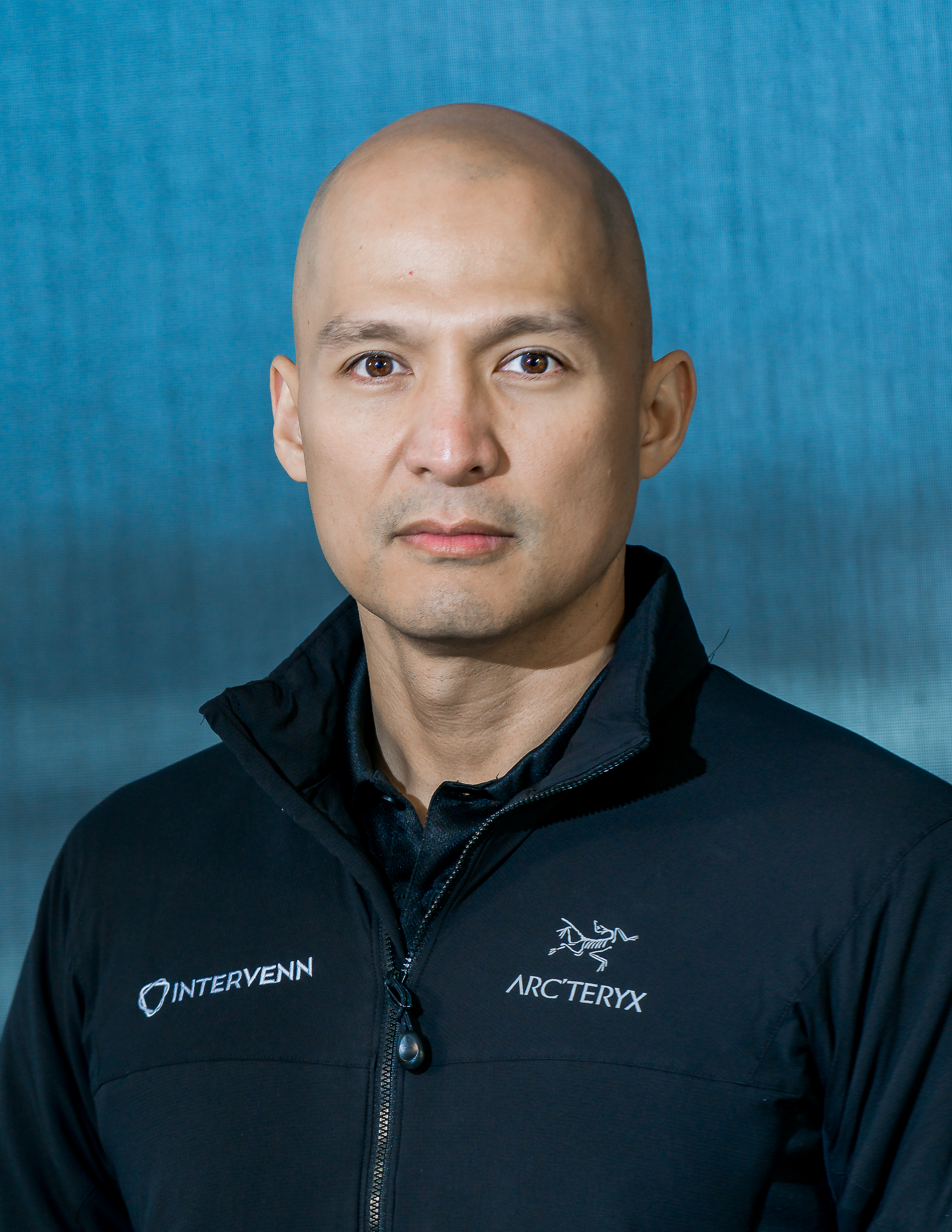
- Born: 19 July 1978 (age 48); Manila, Philippines
- Education: Ateneo De Manila University; Babson College
- Occupation: Entrepreneur
- Known for: Founder of Jukin Media, Veem

Aldo Carrascoso (born July 19, 1978) is a technology entrepreneur known for founding Veem and Jukin Media. He founded InterVenn Biosciences, an American pharmaceutical and biotechnology company, with Carolyn Bertozzi and served as its chief executive officer for six years.

== Background ==
Carrascoso was born and raised in San Juan in Metro Manila. His father was an engineer and a general manager of Manila International Airport, causing Carrascoso to be exposed to technology from a young age.

He attended primary and secondary education at De La Salle, and completed his undergraduate studies at the Ateneo De Manila University, where he received a BS in Psychology. He then went on to earn an MBA from Babson College.

Carrascoso's mother Lily died of breast cancer in 1993. His frustration with the available diagnostic and treatment options was a major factor which later motivated him to enter the field of cancer treatment research. After another relative was diagnosed with cancer in 2016, Carrascoso participated in a trial to determine why genomic sequencing was unable to detect cancer within his family, where he met future InterVenn co-founder Carolyn Bertozzi.

When Carrascoso learned that analysis of the data from the sample would take 12 months, he became determined to develop a method to analyze samples using machine learning and artificial intelligence, eventually leading to the founding of InterVenn Biosciences.

== Career ==
To date, Carrascoso has participated in founding four companies.

=== Verego ===
Carrascoso co-founded Verego, a B2B matchmaking platform, in 2009. He developed the concept for the company based on work completed during his MBA. Carrascoso described the platform as "Tinder for companies," comparing strategic business partnerships to long term relationships or marriage, and utilizing a matching algorithm to pair business with each other.

=== Jukin Media ===
In 2009, Carrascoso also co-founded Jukin Media, a company which licenses, distributes and monetizes viral content, with Jonathan Skogmo and Josh Entman. He served as CTO of the company during its early development. The platform uses a proprietary machine learning algorithm called "Riff" to generate media feeds based on viral keywords.

Jukin raised approximately $6 million in funding from Samsung Ventures, BDMI, Third Wave Digital and Mandalay Entertainment chairman and CEO Peter Guber and was acquired by Trusted Media Brands in 2021.

=== Veem (formerly Align Commerce) ===
In 2012, Carrascoso co-founded Veem (originally named Align Commerce), a multi-channel payment platform, with Marwan Forzley. He served as both CTO and COO, overseeing the development of deep learning algorithms which analyzes transactions to determine whether traditional and blockchain payment channels will be more efficient.

The platform was intended mainly to make the cross-border efficiency of blockchain payment rails readily accessible to small and medium businesses. It was initially funded by Silicon Valley Bank, Kleiner Perkins Caufield & Byers, and later by the National Bank of Australia and Google Ventures.

=== InterVenn Biosciences ===
In 2017, Carrascoso co-founded InterVenn Biosciences along with chemistry professors Carlito Lebrilla and Carolyn Bertozzi The company uses artificial intelligence developed by Carrascoso for glycoproteomic analysis for early diagnosis of certain cancers. InterVenn's first product was "Glori," a liquid biopsy tool for identifying malignant ovarian tumors. Variations of the method have since been used to develop diagnostic tools for 24 other types of cancer, including renal, lung, liver, prostate, pancreatic, nasopharyngeal, and colorectal cancers.

The company raised $45 million USD over two funding rounds in 2018 and 2020, before raising $201 million USD in a series C round led by SoftBank.
