= Elle Girl =

Former teen fashion magazine

- Categories: Fashion
- Publisher: Hachette Filipacchi Media U.S.
- First issue: 2001
- Final issue: 2006
- Country: United States
- Language: English
- ISSN: 1535-7465
- OCLC: 47206359

Elle Girl was the largest older-teen fashion and beauty magazine brand in the world with twelve editions. Launched in August 2001, it was the younger sister version of Elle magazine, and similarly focused on beauty, health, entertainment and trendsetting bold fashion—its slogan: "Dare to be different". The magazine was published monthly and was based in New York City.

== Closure ==
Its staffers were informed in early April 2006 that Elle Girl (USA)'s final issue would be its June/July 2006 Summer Issue, while they were recently in the middle of working on the August 2006 issue, which is traditionally the largest issue of the year-covering fall fashion and back-to-school topics. The company intended to continue updating the Elle Girl website, and create new media in conjunction with Alloy.com, as well as publishing bi-annual special issues.

Hachette Filipacchi CEO Jack Kliger, who was also responsible for closing three other Hachette magazines—George, Mirabella, and Travel Holiday, commented on Elle Girl's future on the Internet and explained, "When teen girls are not on the Web, they are on their cells. The company will keep the website and work on Elle Girl ringtones, wallpaper mobile pages and projects in the mobile blogging area."

ELLEgirl.com relaunched in early 2008 after parting ways with Alloy. The new version included a blog, more simple navigation, and a strengthened association with ELLE.com under Executive Editor Keith Pollock. Hearst Magazines bought the website in 2011. As of May 2014, the ELLEgirl website redirects to the main Elle website.

== International editions ==
The UK edition of Elle Girl magazine closed for business shortly before the American version. As of August 2005, international editions continued to be published in South Korea, the Netherlands, Canada, Taiwan, Japan, Russia, France, Germany, and China. Elle Girl USA offers most foreign editions 60% of their content, yet it was not announced whether all of the foreign editions would also fold. Sarra Manning, author of YA novels Guitar Girl and Let's Get Lost, was on the launch team of Elle Girl UK and edited the magazine for a short period.
