= Equals Three, LLC v. Jukin Media, Inc. =

Copyright infringement lawsuit, United States

- Court: United States District Court for the Central District of California
- Full case name: Equals Three, LLC v. Jukin Media, Inc.
- Decided: October 13, 2015
- Defendant: Jukin Media, Inc.
- Plaintiff: Equals Three, LLC
- Citation: 139 F. Supp. 3d 1094

Holding
- Summary judgment motion granted in part and denied in part.

Court membership
- Judge sitting: Stephen V. Wilson

Keywords
- Copyright infringement; Fair use

Equals Three, LLC v. Jukin Media, Inc., 139 F. Supp. 3d 1094 (C.D. Cal. 2015) was a copyright infringement lawsuit where the court evaluated if commenting on humorous videos in a transformative manner is fair use or exploiting videos for their humor without paying for their use.

== Background ==
Jukin Media, Inc. is a digital media company that aggregates a library of user-generated online video clips and licenses them on behalf of their creators. It employs a team of 11 people to browse the internet looking for videos that go viral, and enters a licensing agreement with their creators. The company amassed a collection of 17,000 short-form videos, which they upload to YouTube and their content-focused websites, and monetizes them through advertisements, sponsorships, subscription, and promotions and licenses deals with television, cable, and YouTube shows.

Equals Three produces short 3–5 minute humor programs that are broadcast on YouTube. This involves a host giving an introduction, showing parts of video clips, and making remarks about the events and persons in the clips, followed by further commentary directed at the people, events, and circumstances depicted in the video. Equals Three obtains footage by scouring the internet for source videos.

Equals Three used portions of Jukin Media's clips without paying a licensing fee.

On March 12, 2014, Equals Three's then-host Ray William Johnson announced that the show would be going on hiatus to find a new host. Prior to resuming broadcast, Jukin Media contacted Equals Three and informed them that any use of Jukin Media's videos would be considered infringement and Jukin Media was willing to negotiate a license agreement, indicating that Equals Three's crediting Jukin and linking to their content was insufficient. On July 16, 2014, Equals Three resumed broadcast and published a video using Jukin's content. On June 25, 2014 Jukin Media sent Equals Three a letter with an invoice which Equals Three did not pay. Jukin Media argued that Equals Three never responded to the letter, never paid the invoice, nor attempted to negotiate a license.

On May 1, 2014, Equals Three alleged that Jukin has filed at least 41 copyright infringement claims against them on YouTube, preventing them from earning advertising revenue from the affected episodes. Equals Three's inability to advertise allowed Jukin to place advertisements on the episodes, redirecting viewers to Jukin’s own YouTube channel.

On November 21, 2014, plaintiff and counterclaim Equals Three sued defendant and counterclaimant Jukin Media, Inc. for a declaratory judgment and relief under Digital Millennium Copyright Act (DMCA), which prohibits false DMCA take-down notices. Jukin Media claimed that Equals Three infringed on 19 of its copyrights and filed a motion for partial summary judgment regarding fair use. Jukin Media argued that Equals Three directly targeted its videos, but didn't offer any evidence other than speculation.

Jukin only submitted copyright registration certificates for two of the subject videos and it presented to the court no licensing agreements granting it rights to the subject videos. Equals Three provided the copyright registration numbers for 18 of the 19 subject videos.

== Opinion ==
In determining if a work is fair use the court considers the following factors under 17 U.S.C. § 107:

1. The purpose and character of the use, including whether such use is of a commercial nature or is for nonprofit educational purposes
2. The nature of the copyrighted work
3. The amount and substantiality of the portion used in relation to the copyrighted work as a whole
4. the effect of the use upon the potential market for or value of the copyrighted work.

Equals Three argues that "the episodes are transformative because they are parodies of the Jukin videos," while Jukin argues that they are not parodies "because they do not critique Jukin's videos." The court said the episodes comment upon or criticize Jukin's videos by highlighting their ridiculousness by creating fictionalized narratives of how the events transpired, using similes, or by directly mocking the depicted events and people within the videos. Equals Three's use of Jukin's videos is admittedly commercial, but the commercial nature of the use is outweighed by the transformativeness. The court found that the video use in the episode Sheep to Balls, where a person buys a phone and drops it, was not transformative and is not fair use. Other than Sheep to Balls, the court did not find any evidence that Equals Three did not in good faith believe that it was making fair use of Jukin's videos and the Equals Three videos to be highly transformative, weighing in favor of fair use.

For the nature of the copyrighted work, the court found Jukin's work to be creative. Jukin's videos were all published before Equals Three used them. The court finds this factor not particularly important where the new work is highly transformative.

For the substantiality Jukin argues Equals Three uses the most important parts of the videos and Equals Three argues that it uses no more of Jukin's videos than is necessary to achieve its purpose of criticizing and commenting. The court side with Equals Three where they used no more than necessary to allow the host's jokes, comments, and criticisms, favoring fair use.

For the potential market Jukin alleges that Equals Three frequently copies its videos during the time when they are most valuable. Equals Three argues that there is no way for a viewer to share a source video contained in an Equals Three episode without having the viewer watch the entire episode. The court finds that the transformative nature of the video makes cognizable market harm less likely with no actual evidence of any such harm.

The court granted Jukin's motion for summary judgment to the extent that Jukin asserts that the video "Sheep to Balls" is not a fair use and entered a partial judgement. But for all other videos the Court denies Jukin's motion for summary judgment.
