= LianLian DigiTech =

Chinese digital payment solution provider

- Type: Publicly Traded (HKEX Stock Code: 2598.HK)
- Industry: FinTech, Mobile Payments
- Founded: 2009
- Headquarters: Hangzhou, Zhejiang, China
- Area served: Worldwide
- Website: www.lianlian.com

LianLian DigiTech is a Chinese digital mobile payment company with its registered office in Hangzhou, Zhejiang. It's listed on the Main Board of the Hong Kong Stock Exchange under stock code 2598. The company provides digital payment services in China and in cross-border and overseas markets, as well as payment-related value-added services. Its digital payment services include pay-in, pay-out, acquiring, foreign exchange, virtual card and payment aggregation services. Its value-added services include digital marketing, referral services, account and e-wallet services, and software development.

Lianlian Global is a brand of Lianlian DigiTech that provides cross-border payment and related financial technology services. LianLian Pay provides online payment, account management and integrated payment services in China as part of the group's payment business.

== History ==
=== Foundation and early business ===
Lianlian DigiTech was established in 2009, with its headquarters located in Hangzhou, China. At the end of 2024, the total payment volume of Lianlian DigiTech's digital payment business reached RMB 3.3 trillion.

In August 2011, Lianlian Yintong Electronic Payment Co., Ltd., a subsidiary of Lianlian DigiTech, obtained a third-party payment licence from the People's Bank of China covering internet and mobile phone payment services.

In 2013, it launched mobile payment services for merchants and entered the cross-border e-commerce payment market.

=== Expansion into cross-border payments ===
In 2017, it began operations in Hong Kong as a cross-border business hub with a Money Services Operator licence.

In 2018, the company established a presence in the United Kingdom, Ireland and Brazil.

In 2021, its subsidiary Starlink Financial Technologies Pte. Ltd. obtained a Major Payment Institution licence from the Monetary Authority of Singapore.That year, the group also obtained money transmitter licences covering all U.S. states.

In 2024, Lianlian DigiTech obtained an Electronic Money Institution license in Luxembourg to provide cross-border payment services in the European market.

=== Corporate restructuring ===
On 2 December 2020, the promoters of the company entered into a promoters' agreement to convert the company into a joint stock limited company with a registered capital of RMB1.00558 billion. The conversion was completed on 3 December 2020, and the company was renamed Lianlian DigiTech Co., Ltd.

=== Initial public offering ===
Lianlian DigiTech listed on the Main Board of the Hong Kong Stock Exchange on 28 March 2024. The final offer price was HK$10.22 per H share, and the stock code is 2598.

The global offering comprised 64.3 million H shares after the full exercise of the offer size adjustment option. This included 19.29 million Hong Kong offer shares and 45.01 million international offer shares. The IPO generated gross proceeds of HK$657.15 million and estimated net proceeds of HK$548.02 million.

The prospectus stated that the company intended to use the proceeds mainly to enhance technology capabilities, expand overseas market presence, obtain additional licences globally, pursue strategic investments or acquisitions, and support general corporate purposes and working capital.

=== Post-listing overseas expansion ===
In 2024, it announced that Lianlian Europe S.A. had obtained an Electronic Money Institution licence in Luxembourg.

In 2025, it established its overseas business headquarters in Hong Kong.

In April 2026, the company announced that it had obtained a Money Services Business registration from the Financial Transactions and Reports Analysis Centre of Canada through acquiring an entity.

In May 2026, the company announced that it had obtained a payment services licence from the Dubai Financial Services Authority and would operate through Dubai International Financial Centre.

== Business ==
Lianlian DigiTech operates through four reportable segments: Global Payment, Domestic Payment, Value-added Services, and Others.

=== Core Businesses ===
Lianlian DigiTech provides digital payment services and value-added services. Its digital payment services include pay-in, pay-out, acquiring, foreign exchange, virtual card and payment aggregation services.

According to the company, it is developing applications of the digital renminbi in consumer payments and cross-border corporate settlements. It also reports having local offices in 13 countries and regions.

=== Artificial intelligence and technology ===
According to the company, it uses artificial intelligence in its payment, compliance and treasury management processes. In 2026, Lianlian DigiTech collaborated separately with Visa and UnionPay International on AI agent-based payment applications.

=== Value-added Services ===
The company's value-added services comprise business services, including digital marketing, operational support and referrals, and technology services, including account and e-wallet services and software development.

== Lianlian Global ==
LianLian Global is a brand of Lianlian DigiTech providing cross-border payment services. According to its payment-processing partner Thredd, it serves businesses engaged in e-commerce, business-to-business trade and trade in services.

According to the same case study, Lianlian Global provides cross-border payment solutions including fund collection, acquiring, payouts and tax refund assistance.

== Licences and regulatory approvals ==
As of 30 June 2026, Lianlian DigiTech reported holding 68 payment licences and related qualifications worldwide. In December 2024, its then wholly owned subsidiary DFX Labs Company Limited obtained licences to operate a virtual asset trading platform in Hong Kong. Its U.S. subsidiary, LL Pay U.S., LLC, holds state money transmitter licences.

=== Mainland China payment licences ===
According to Lianlian DigiTech's 2024 prospectus, its subsidiary Lianlian Yintong Electronic Payment Co., Ltd. held a payment business licence covering internet and mobile phone payments in China, with related services including pay-in, pay-out and acquiring.

=== Cross-border RMB and foreign exchange qualifications ===
Lianlian DigiTech's 2024 prospectus listed two e-commerce cross-border renminbi settlement filings held by Lianlian Yintong Electronic Payment Co., Ltd., each associated with a different local branch of the People's Bank of China. The prospectus also listed Lianlian Yintong's authorisation from the State Administration of Foreign Exchange (SAFE) to provide cross-border foreign exchange payment services and its qualification under SAFE's foreign exchange payment pilot programme.

=== Hong Kong licences and presence ===
Lianlian DigiTech established its first overseas office in Hong Kong in 2016. In 2017, the group began operating in Hong Kong under a money service operator (MSO) licence, using its Hong Kong operations as a hub for its cross-border business.

On 18 November 2025, the company established its overseas business headquarters in Hong Kong.

=== Luxembourg electronic money institution licence ===
On 27 May 2024, Lianlian DigiTech announced that its wholly owned subsidiary, LianLian Europe S.A., had obtained an electronic money institution licence from Luxembourg's Commission de Surveillance du Secteur Financier. The licence authorised LianLian Europe to issue, distribute and redeem electronic money and provide money remittance services.

=== Other overseas licences ===
Lianlian DigiTech's 2024 prospectus listed licences held by entities within the group, including a Major Payment Institution licence in Singapore, a Fund Transfer Operator licence in Indonesia, authorisation as a payment institution in the United Kingdom, state money transmitter licences in the United States, and designated payment services licences in Thailand.

=== Canada MSB registration ===
On 27 April 2026, Lianlian DigiTech announced that the group had obtained a money services business (MSB) registration with the Financial Transactions and Reports Analysis Centre of Canada (FINTRAC) through the acquisition of an entity.

=== Middle East and DIFC licence ===
On 19 May 2026, Lianlian DigiTech announced that it had obtained a payment services licence from the Dubai Financial Services Authority. The announcement stated that the company was operating from the Dubai International Financial Centre (DIFC).

== Financial performance ==
For the first half of 2026 (H1 2026), the company reported revenue of RMB875.6 million (an 11.9% increase year-on-year). The company also reported adjusted operating profit of RMB156 million, up 147.3% year-on-year, excluding non-operating items.

=== Revenue ===
For the year ended 31 December 2025, Lianlian DigiTech reported revenue of RMB1,733.8 million, an increase of 31.9% year-on-year. Digital payment services generated RMB1,450.0 million, value-added services generated RMB264.9 million, and other businesses, primarily property rental, generated RMB18.9 million.

=== Profit ===
For 2025, Lianlian DigiTech reported profit for the year of RMB1,662.1 million. It also reported adjusted profit of RMB1,871.2 million, a non-IFRS measure calculated by adding back share-based compensation expenses.

The year's results included a gain of RMB1,601.5 million from the disposal of a 14.56% equity interest in Express (Hangzhou) Technology Services Company Limited, also known as LianTong, to American Express.

=== Total payment volume ===
In 2024, the total payment volume (TPV) of Lianlian DigiTech's digital payment business reached RMB3.3 trillion, an increase of 64.7% year-on-year.

For the six months ended 30 June 2025, the company's digital payment TPV reached RMB2.1 trillion.

=== Segment performance ===
In 2025, the total payment volume of the company's global payment services increased by 60.7% to RMB452.4 billion. Revenue from global payment services reached RMB1,044.6 million, an increase of 29.3% year-on-year.

Revenue from domestic payment services reached RMB405.4 million, up 18.3% year-on-year. Revenue from value-added services reached RMB264.9 million, up 81.2% year-on-year. The company attributed the increase in value-added services revenue mainly to growth in its virtual card business.

== Partnerships and collaborations ==
=== American Express joint venture ===
In 2017, Lianlian DigiTech, in partnership with American Express, established a joint venture, Express (Hangzhou) Technology Services Company Limited ("LianTong"), in China.

In June 2020, the People's Bank of China granted final approval for a bankcard clearing licence to Express (Hangzhou) Technology Services Co., a joint venture between American Express and Lianlian DigiTech.

=== Thredd partnership ===
In August 2024, LianLian Global launched its Yueda virtual card programme in the Asia-Pacific region, using Thredd's card issuing and payment processing services.

=== Other payment network and banking partnerships ===
In its 2024 annual report, published in April 2025, Lianlian DigiTech stated that it collaborated with Visa, Mastercard and American Express to provide card payment services for overseas education institutions.

In its 2025 annual results announcement, published in March 2026, the company stated that it had established partnerships during 2025 with UnionPay International, Visa, 12 Victory, Veem, PAYSO and Waffo.

== Recognition ==
In 2019, a project led by Lianlian Yintong received first prize in the 2018 Zhejiang Science and Technology Progress Awards.

In 2023, Lianlian DigiTech was designated an e-commerce demonstration enterprise by China’s Ministry of Commerce.

In 2025, Lianlian International Company Limited received a Certificate of Merit in the FinTech: Banking, Investment and Insurance stream of the Hong Kong ICT Awards for its Lianlian Global Payout Service.
