= Thomas Ryder =

Thomas or Tom Ryder may refer to:

- Thomas Philander Ryder (1836–1887), American musician
- Tom Ryder (rugby union) (born 1985), rugby union player
- Tom Ryder (baseball) (1863–1935), baseball outfielder
- Thomas Ryder (actor) (1735–1790), British actor and theatre manager
- Thomas Ryder (engraver) (1746–1810), English engraver
- Thomas Ryder (MP), British member of parliament for Tiverton borough, 1755-6
- Thomas O. Ryder (born 1944), American businessman and executive
- Tom Ryder (politician) (born 1949), American lawyer and politician in Illinois
- Tom Ryder, a fictional actor portrayed by Aaron Taylor-Johnson in the 2024 film The Fall Guy

== See also ==
- Thomas Rider (disambiguation)
