= Agriomorpha fusca =

Scientific classification
- Kingdom: Animalia
- Phylum: Arthropoda
- Clade: Pancrustacea
- Class: Insecta
- Order: Odonata
- Suborder: Zygoptera
- Family: Rhipidolestidae
- Genus: Agriomorpha
- Species: A. fusca

Binomial name
- Agriomorpha fusca May, 1933

Species of damselfly

Agriomorpha fusca is common species of damselfly in the family Rhipidolestidae. It is commonly known as the Chinese yellowface. Agriomorpha fusca rest with its wings folded while many related damselfies rest with their wings spread flat. This species is found in China (Guangdong, Guangxi, Hong Kong, and Hainan).
