= Rhipidolestes okinawanus =

Conservation status
- Endangered (IUCN 2.3)

Scientific classification
- Kingdom: Animalia
- Phylum: Arthropoda
- Clade: Pancrustacea
- Class: Insecta
- Order: Odonata
- Suborder: Zygoptera
- Family: Rhipidolestidae
- Genus: Rhipidolestes
- Species: R. okinawanus

Binomial name
- Rhipidolestes okinawanus Asahina, 1951

Species of damselfly

Rhipidolestes okinawanus is a species of damselfly in the family Rhipidolestidae. It is endemic to Japan.
