= Silsby =

Silsby may refer to:

== People ==
- Jill Silsby (1925–2023), British entomologist and author
- Paula D. Silsby (1951–) former U.S. Attorney
- Silsby Spalding (1886–1949), American businessman and politician; the first Mayor of Beverly Hills, California

== Places ==
- Richvale, California, formerly called Silsby
