= Jan Brandt =

American businesswoman

- Born: Brooklyn, New York
- Education: Boston University
- Occupations: Businesswoman, marketing executive
- Employer: AOL
- Known for: Former CMO of AOL; AOL CD "carpet bombing" campaign

Janice Brandt is an American businesswoman and vice chair emeritus of America Online/Time Warner and the former chief marketing officer of AOL from 1993 to 2002. She is known for her direct marketing campaign at AOL that increased the number of subscribers from 200,000 to more than 22 million.

== Early life and education ==
Jan Brandt was born in Brooklyn, New York and moved to New Jersey at the age of eight. She graduated from Boston University's School of Public Communications. Following graduation, she began working as a copywriter at Xerox Education Publications in Middletown, Connecticut. She enrolled in night courses at the University of Connecticut and decided to switch careers to marketing.

== Career ==
After a brief period working for Colonial Penn in Philadelphia, Brandt moved to Palo Alto, California, to join Education Today publishing with Thomas O. Ryder, where she worked for 10 years. She then briefly returned to Xerox Education Publications, which by then had been acquired by Newfield Publications, before being hired by Steve Case as vice president of marketing of AOL in 1993.

=== AOL ===
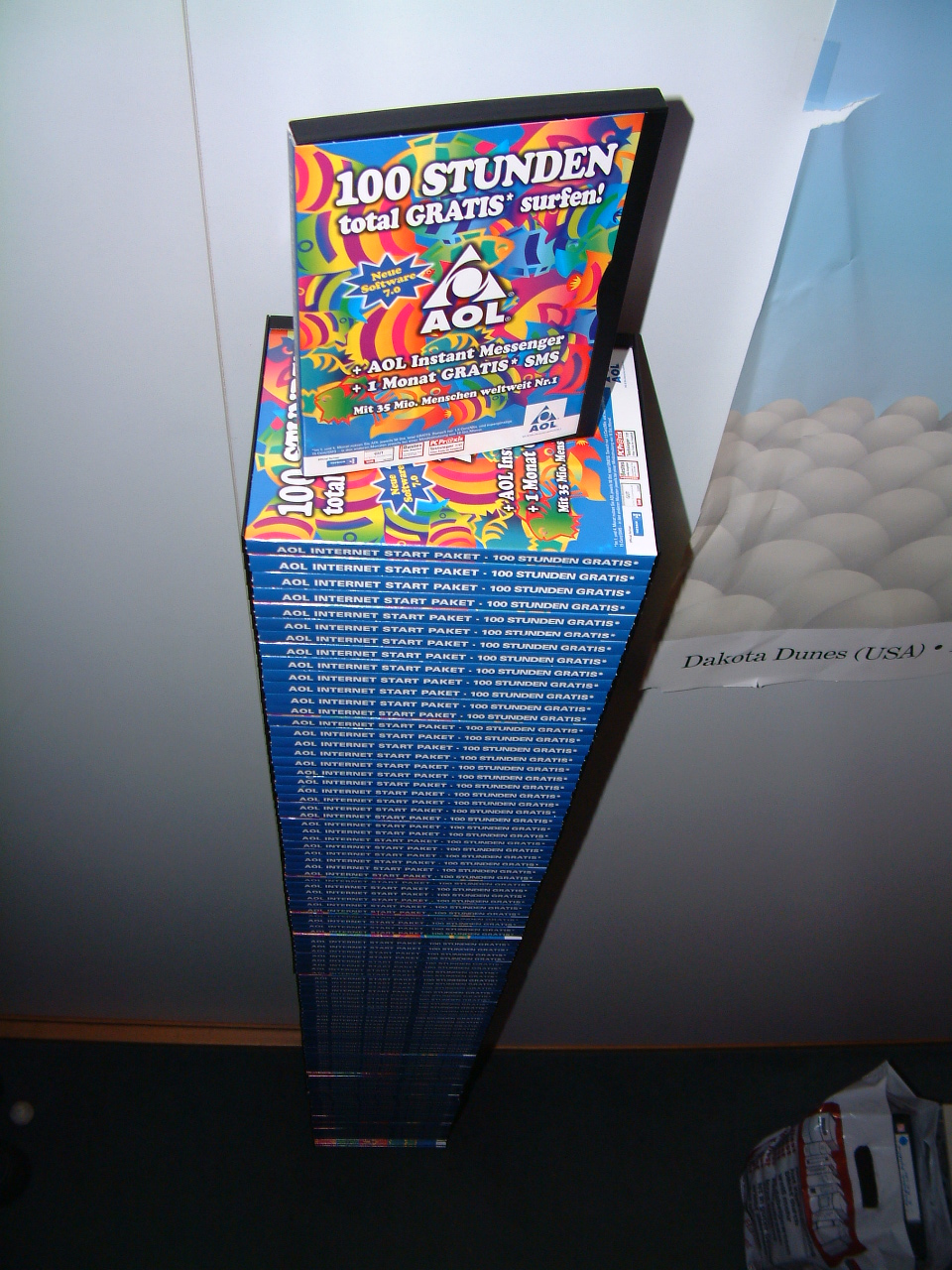
AOL free trial CDs sent to a student dormitory in Aachen, Germany

Brandt was hired with the explicit goal to grow the subscriber base and was given free rein over AOL's marketing strategies. After AOL began sending complimentary discs to people who requested them, Brandt set up a direct marketing campaign to distribute AOL installation diskettes in the mail. The trial campaign cost $250,000 and had an average response of over 10% uptake, with some mailing lists pulling as high as 16–18%. This prompted Brandt to expand the campaign beyond direct mailing and start working with nonconventional distribution partners, such as airlines and cereal companies. At one point, 50% of the CDs produced worldwide had an AOL logo. This "carpet bombing" strategy was instrumental in moving AOL beyond Prodigy and CompuServe to dominate the online service provider market.

In 2002, Brandt stepped down as vice chair and chief marketing officer of AOL to take a part-time consulting position.

Brandt was named twice by Fortune Magazine as one of the "50 Most Powerful Women in American Business", in 1999 and 2000. She also received Direct Marketing Days New York's "Direct Marketer of the Year" award in 2000, and the 2001 "Direct Marketer of the Year" award from Target Marketing.

== Personal life ==
Brandt has been politically active since the 1990s, and a longtime supporter of EMILY's List. She currently sits on the board of directors for Women for Women International, a humanitarian organization for providing aid to women in war-torn regions. Brandt joined the board of directors of the Vet Voice Foundation in October 2022.
