= Mechanix Illustrated =

US magazine

- MI cover from February 1982
- Publisher: Modern Mechanix Publishing Co., Greenwich, Connecticut
- Founded: 1928
- Final issue: March/April 2001
- Country: United States
- Based in: New York City
- Language: English
- ISSN: 0025-6587

Mechanix Illustrated is an American printed magazine that was originally published by Fawcett Publications. Its title was founded in 1928 to compete against the older Popular Science and Popular Mechanics. Billed as "The How-To-Do Magazine," Mechanix Illustrated (MI) aimed to guide readers through various projects from home improvements and advice on repairs to "build-your-own (sports car, telescope, helicopter, etc)." It was headquartered in New York City.

== History and profile ==
From its debut in 1928, it went through a number of permutations over the years, being called at various points in its life, Modern Mechanics and Inventions, Modern Mechanix and Inventions, Modern Mechanix, Mechanix Illustrated, Home Mechanix, and, in its final incarnation, Today's Homeowner.

Although it featured many how-to articles, the most eagerly awaited and read features were Tom McCahill's monthly automobile tests which ran from the late 1940s to the early 1970s. McCahill's feisty opinions were delivered in a prose laced with similes that are still quoted today among car enthusiasts: "As anyone brighter than a rusty spike must know..."; flooring the accelerator pedal on a certain car is "...like stepping on a wet sponge"; the clock/tachometer combination on another car is "...about as useful as feathers on a moose." McCahill died in 1974, and three years later CBS bought Fawcett Publications, the company which published MI, and continued publishing the magazine, renaming it Home Mechanix starting in January 1985. In August 1996, it was again renamed as Today's Homeowner, and ceased publication with the March/April 2001 issue, being merged into the sister publication This Old House.

In the 1980s, the magazine featured more and more home repair, remodel and woodworking projects while featuring fewer articles on general technology and automotive projects.

A long-running feature of Mechanix Illustrated was "Mimi," a shapely young woman dressed in skimpy overalls with blue and white vertical stripes; and, in the early sixties, a matching railroad engineer's cap (later discontinued). She was in a picture holding, standing beside, sitting on, lying on or just in the picture with a new product each month. Each "Mimi" held the job for a year. Their names were never given except for the announcement of a new "Mimi" in the January issue. One Mimi did, however, hold the job for a few years in the sixties. An actress from Southern California, she left to live in Hawaii, and a readers' poll was conducted to choose a replacement from a short list. The readers' choice only lasted a short while, and was replaced by one of the runners-up. "Mimi" was discontinued with the change to Home Mechanix.

A long-running cartoon feature, Roy Doty's "Wordless Workshop," is currently appearing in "The Family Handyman" magazine.

John August Media, LLC acquired the Mechanix Illustrated trademark and revived the magazine as part of TechnicaCuriosa.com, along with sister titles Popular Electronics and Popular Astronomy.
