= Première (magazine) =

French film magazine, founded 1976

Premiere

- Cover of the June 2006 U.S. edition, featuring Tom Cruise
- Editor: Peter Herbst (U.S. edition)
- Categories: Film; Entertainment
- Frequency: Monthly
- First issue: November 1976; 49 years ago (France); July 1987 (United States); September 16, 1992 (United Kingdom)
- Final issue: April 2007 (U.S. edition)
- Company: Hachette Filipacchi; Hildegarde (current French edition publisher)
- Country: France; United States; United Kingdom
- Language: French; English
- Website: www.premiere.fr (French) www.premiere.com
- ISSN: 0894-9263
- OCLC: 224368933

Première is a French film magazine based in Paris and published by Hachette Filipacchi since 1976. Editions are, or have been, published in other markets.

== History ==
The French film magazine Première was launched in November 1976 by Jean-Pierre Frimbois and Marc Esposito and originally published by the Lagardère Group. Since 2016, it has been published by Hildegarde.

== US edition ==
The U.S. version of the magazine was launched by News Corporation, based in New York City and Los Angeles, with its July/August 1987 edition. Their mission was to "reflect The Second Golden Age of the Movies". Susan Lyne was the founding editor, and among those working for the magazine was Peter Biskind, who spent a decade at the magazine as executive editor. He said that, early on, the magazine "gave us a lot of freedom to do hard-hitting, in-depth reporting."

Critic Glenn Kenny joined the US staff in June 1996, and served as a critic and later as senior editor until it ceased publication.

News Corporation sold the magazine to K-III (now Rent Group) in 1991, and Hachette Filipacchi Media U.S. reacquired the magazine, on behalf of the founding French publisher, in 1995. After Lyne left the magazine, Chris Connelly became editor-in-chief in early 1996, while Nancy Griffin served as deputy editor. Both editors resigned suddenly in May of the same year after publisher Hachette Filipacchi's then president and chief executive, David Pecker, told Connelly not to publish a column about Planet Hollywood because of its ties to billionaire Revlon owner Ronald Perelman, who was also half-owner of Premiere. James B. Meigs was listed as the editor-in-chief from the August 1996 issue.

Premiere's editor, Peter Herbst, was appointed senior vice president and group editorial director for Hachette Filipacchi Media U.S. in 2002. From 1995 to 2000, Herbst was editor-in-chief of Family Life magazine.

=== End of U.S. edition ===
On March 5, 2007, publisher Hachette Filipacchi Media U.S. announced that it was shutting down the U.S. print edition of Premiere and that the magazine would survive as an online-only publication.

The last published issue was dated April 2007, with Will Ferrell on its cover; Ferrell is shown in character from his role for his just-released film, Blades of Glory.

The online version only lasted for a few years, and the magazine ceased all operations in 2010.

== Other international editions ==
=== Japan ===
A Japanese edition was launched in 1990, and published by Kadokawa Shoten.

=== UK ===
In September 1992, a UK edition was released, published by Emap Metro and edited by Barry McIlheney for 5 years until its closure in 1997.

The February 1998 U.S. edition published in the United Kingdom incorporated a special UK film section. By the October 1998 edition, this was published as a separate supplement but had ceased by January 1999.

=== Other European editions ===
A Russian edition of the magazine was last published in December 2004.

As of March 2007, in addition to the original edition in France, editions were being published in Czech Republic, Poland, Portugal and Spain.

The Portuguese edition was canceled in October 2007.

The last issue of the Czech edition was released in June 2009.
