= Hearst Magazines =

American mass media division of Hearst Communications

- Trade name: Hearst USA
- Native name: Hearst Magazines Inc.
- Type: Division
- Industry: Mass media
- Headquarters: Hearst Tower, New York City, New York, United States
- Area served: Worldwide
- Key people: Debi Chirichella (Senior Vice President); Regina Buckley (Chief Financial and Strategy Officer); Adwoa Dadzie (Chief People Officer)
- Products: Magazines
- Parent: Hearst Communications
- Subsidiaries: Motor Trend Group (majority)
- Website: hearstmagazines.com

Hearst Magazines Inc. is a publishing company in the United States, owned by Hearst Communications, that operates in the creation and publication of magazines in the United States and abroad. Its headquarters are located at Hearst Tower in the Midtown Manhattan of New York City. It has an audience of more than 165 million readers and site visitors, directly engaging with 70 percent of all millennials and 69 percent of all Gen Z age of 18.

In 2011, Hearst acquired the non-French magazines of Hachette Filipacchi Médias, including Hachette Filipacchi Media U.S.. The company published US magazines such as Elle, Road & Track, and Woman's Day. In 2014, Hearst acquired Rodale, publisher of magazines including Prevention, Men's Health, and Bicycling. In 2019, it acquired the rights to Autoweek from Crain Communications.

In December 2024, Hearst Communications acquired Motor Trend Group and most of its assets from Warner Bros. Discovery. The division was placed into Hearst Magazines. In December 2025, Hearst Magazines announced that it would no longer allow the promotion of animal fur in its editorial content or advertising, following a five-day campaign by the Coalition to Abolish the Fur Trade.

== International ==
Hearst Magazines International
- Type: Subsidiary
- Industry: Mass media
- Headquarters: Hearst Tower, New York City, New York, United States
- Area served: Outside the US
- Key people: Jonathan Wright (President); Kim St. Clair Bodden (Senior Vice President & Editorial Director)
- Products: Magazines
- Parent: Hearst Magazines
- Divisions: Hearst UK; Hearst China; Hearst Japan; Hearst Spain; Hearst Italia; Hearst Netherlands; Hearst Taiwan
- Website: hearstmagazinesinternational.com

Hearst Magazines International comprises eight owned and operated companies, nine joint ventures, and 45 licensing partners in 57 countries. The international division of Hearst Magazines controls more than 200 publications and 150 websites worldwide. The division was expanded after it acquired the international division of Hachette Filipacchi Media from Lagardère for €651 million in 2011.

== Assets ==
=== Hearst USA ===
- Hearst Magazines Inc.
  - Bicycling
  - Men's Health
  - Prevention
  - Runner's World
  - Women's Health
- Hearst Magazine Media, Inc.
  - BESTproducts.com
  - Biography.com
  - Cosmopolitan
  - Country Living
  - delish.com
  - Elle
  - Elle Decor
  - Esquire
  - Food Network Magazine
  - Good Housekeeping
  - Harper's Bazaar
  - HGTV Magazine
  - House Beautiful
  - Popular Mechanics
  - redbookmag.com
  - seventeen.com
  - The Pioneer Woman
  - Town & Country
  - Woman's Day
- Hearst Autos, Inc.
  - Autoweek.com
  - Car and Driver
  - Road & Track
  - Motor Trend Group, LLC
    - Hot Rod
- Bring a Trailer Media, LLC
  - Bring a Trailer
- Oprah Daily LLC
  - Oprah Daily
- Veranda Publications, Inc.
  - Veranda

=== Hearst UK ===
- The National Magazine Company Ltd.
  - best
  - Cosmopolitan
  - Country Living
  - Digital Spy
  - Elle
  - Elle Decoration
  - Esquire
  - Good Housekeeping
  - Harper's Bazaar
  - House Beautiful
  - Inside Soap
  - Men's Health
  - prima
  - Red
  - Runner's World
  - Women's Health

=== Hearst China ===
- Beijing Hearst Advertising Co., Ltd.
  - Car and Driver
  - Elle
  - Elle Decoration
  - Harper's Bazaar

=== Hearst Italia ===
- Hearst Magazines Italia S.p.A.
  - Cosmopolitan
  - Elle
  - Elle Decor
  - Esquire
  - Gente
  - Harper's Bazaar
  - Marie Claire
  - Men's Health
  - Runner's World

=== Hearst Japan ===
- Hearst Fujingaho Co., Ltd.
  - 25ans
  - Elle
  - Elle Decor
  - Esquire
  - fujingaho
  - Harper's Bazaar
  - Hodinkee
  - Men's Club
  - Men's Health
  - Modern Living
  - Richesse
  - Women's Health
- Hearst Digital Japan Co., Ltd.

=== Hearst Netherlands ===
- Hearst Magazines Netherlands B.V.
  - Bicycling
  - Cosmopolitan
  - Elle
  - Elle Decoration
  - JAN
  - Men's Health
  - National Geographic
  - Quest
  - Quote
  - Runner's World
  - Women's Health

=== Hearst Spain ===
- Hearst España, S.L.
  - Car and Driver
  - Cosmopolitan
  - Diez Minutos
  - Elle
  - Elle Decoration
  - Esquire
  - Fotogramas
  - Harper's Bazaar
  - Men's Health
  - Nuevo Estilo
  - Runner's World
  - Women's Health

=== Hearst Taiwan ===
- Hearst Magazines Taiwan Co., Ltd.
  - Cosmopolitan
  - Elle
  - Esquire
  - Harper's Bazaar
  - Women's Health

== See also ==
- Hachette Filipacchi Media U.S.
- Hearst Shkulev Media
