= Bornargiolestes =

Scientific classification
- Kingdom: Animalia
- Phylum: Arthropoda
- Clade: Pancrustacea
- Class: Insecta
- Order: Odonata
- Suborder: Zygoptera
- Family: Rhipidolestidae
- Genus: Bornargiolestes; Kimmins, 1936

Genus of damselflies

Bornargiolestes is a genus of insects in the damselfly suborder Zygoptera, family Rhipidolestidae.

== Species ==
These three species belong to the genus Bornargiolestes:

- Bornargiolestes fuscus Dow, 2014
- Bornargiolestes nigra Kimmins, 1936
- Bornargiolestes reelsi Dow, 2014
