= Sarra Manning =

English writer and journalist

Sarra Manning is an English writer and journalist. She attended the University of Sussex and took an English with media studies degree. She became a freelance writer after submitting her work to Melody Maker. She worked as the entertainment editor for five years of the now-defunct teen magazine Just Seventeen. Manning was the editor of Elle Girl (UK edition), then re-launched What To Wear magazine for the BBC and has worked on UK magazines such as Bliss and The Face. She has contributed to Elle, Seventeen, The Guardian and Details and is a contributing editor to Elle UK. She writes regularly for Grazia, Red and Stella, as well as consulting for a number of British magazine publishers. Her books include teen fiction book Guitar Girl, and the Diary of a Crush trilogy.

Manning is currently the literary editor of Red magazine, a UK women's magazine.

== Novels ==
She has written over 25 novels, both young adult and adult. Her first young adult novel, Guitar Girl, was published in 2003. Her first adult novel, Unsticky, was published by Headline in 2009.

== Personal life ==
She currently lives in North London. She had a Staffordshire Bull Terrier, Miss Betsy, and is an advocate for dog adoption.

== Publications ==
- Guitar Girl - UK, 2003; US, 2004
- Diary of a Crush 1: French Kiss - UK, 2004; US, 2006
- Diary of a Crush 2: Kiss and Make Up - UK, 2004 (parts given away with Just Seventeen under the title, Losing It); US, 2006
- Diary of a Crush 3: Sealed with a Kiss - UK, 2004 (parts given away with Just Seventeen under the title, American Dream); US. 2006
- Pretty Things - UK & US, 2005
- Let's Get Lost - UK & US, 2006
- Fashionistas 1: Laura - UK, 2007
- Fashionistas 2: Hadley - UK, 2007
- Fashionistas 3: Irina - UK, 2008
- Fashionistas 4: Candy - UK, 2008
- Unsticky - UK, 2009
- Nobody's Girl - UK, 2010
- You Don't Have to Say You Love Me - UK, 2011
- Nine Uses for an Ex-Boyfriend - UK, 2012
- Adorkable - UK, 2012
- It Felt Like A Kiss - 2013
- Diary of a Grace - 2014
- The Worst Girlfriend in the World - UK, 2014
- It felt like a Kiss - 2014
- After The Last Dance - UK, 2016
- London Belongs to Us - UK, 2016
- The House of Secrets - UK, 2017
- The Rise and Fall of Becky Sharp - UK, 2018
- Rescue Me - UK, 2021
- London, with Love - UK, 2022
- The Man of Her Dreams - UK, 2023
- The Last Days of Summer - UK, 2025
