= Worldwide Dragonfly Association =

The Worldwide Dragonfly Association (WDA) is an association that aims to advance public education and awareness through the promotion of the study and conservation of dragonflies and damselflies order Odonata and their natural habitats in all parts of the world. The WDA was founded in 1997. Its founding members included Jill Silsby, who subsequently served as honorary secretary and treasurer. It publishes the research journal The International Journal of Odonatology (IJO), and Agrion, the WDA's semi-annual bulletin. WDA also organises the biennial International Congress of Odonatology (ICO).
