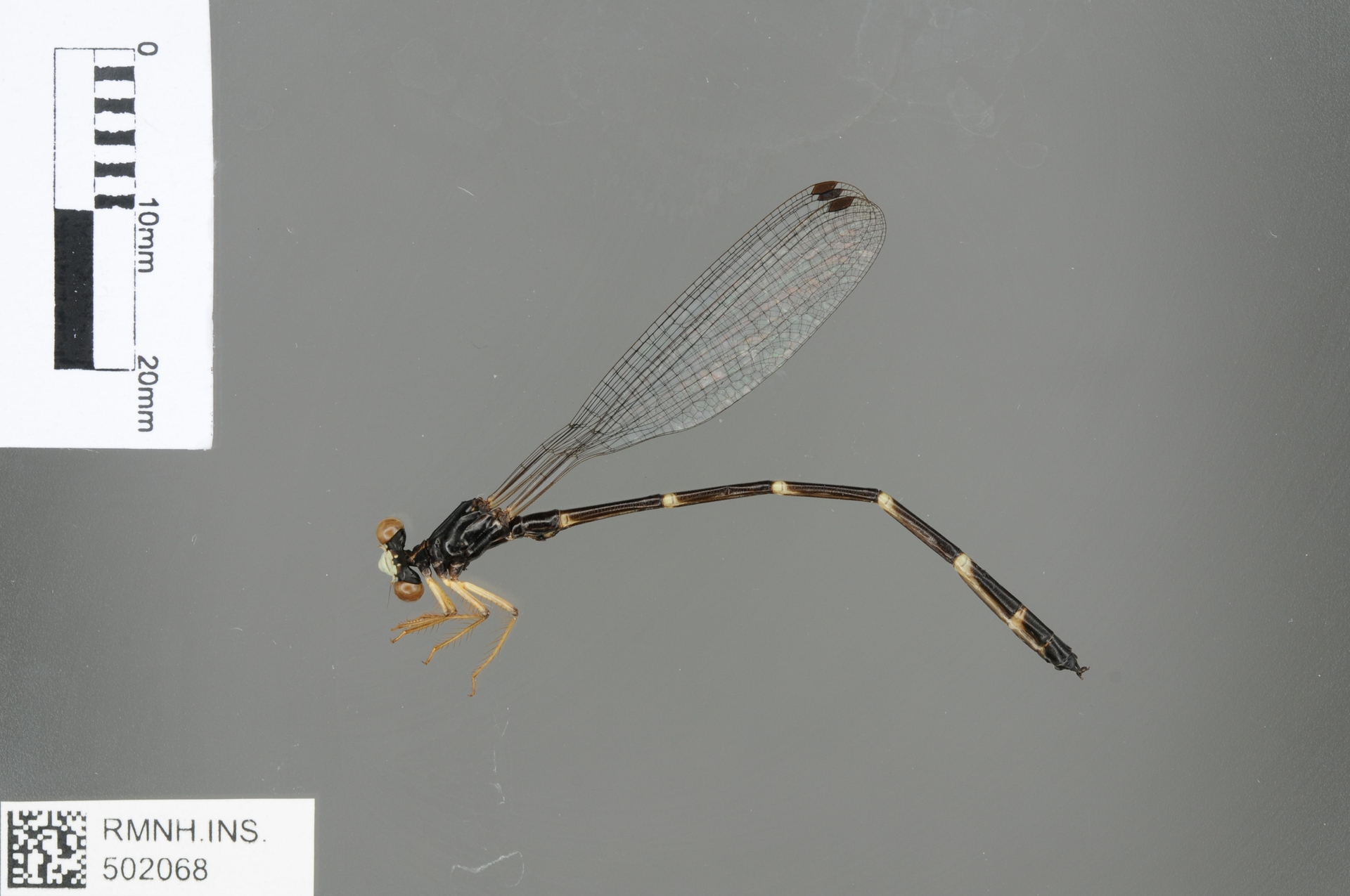
- Burmargiolestes laidlawi

Scientific classification
- Kingdom: Animalia
- Phylum: Arthropoda
- Clade: Pancrustacea
- Class: Insecta
- Order: Odonata
- Suborder: Zygoptera
- Family: Rhipidolestidae
- Genus: Burmargiolestes; Kennedy, 1925

= Burmargiolestes =

Genus of damselflies

Burmargiolestes is a genus of insects in the damselfly suborder Zygoptera, family Rhipidolestidae.

== Species ==
- Burmargiolestes laidlawi Lieftinck, 1960
- Burmargiolestes melanothorax (Selys, 1891)
