= Travel Holiday =

American travel magazine

- Categories: Travel magazine
- Frequency: Monthly
- Founded: 1901
- Final issue: June 2003
- Country: United States
- Language: English
- ISSN: 0199-025X

Travel Holiday, formerly Travel, was an American travel magazine, published from 1901 to 2003.

== History and profile ==
The magazine was first published in 1901 as the Four-Track News by the New York Central Railroad. It was sold in 1906, and filed for bankruptcy in 1946. The title was purchased out of bankruptcy by Herman Shane.

Travel merged with the competing magazine Holiday in 1977.

The Reader's Digest Association bought Travel Holiday from the Shane family in 1986. The company sold it to Hachette Filipacchi Media U.S. in March 1996. Hachette Filipacchi closed the magazine in 2003 due to low advertising revenue. The last issue was published in June 2003.
