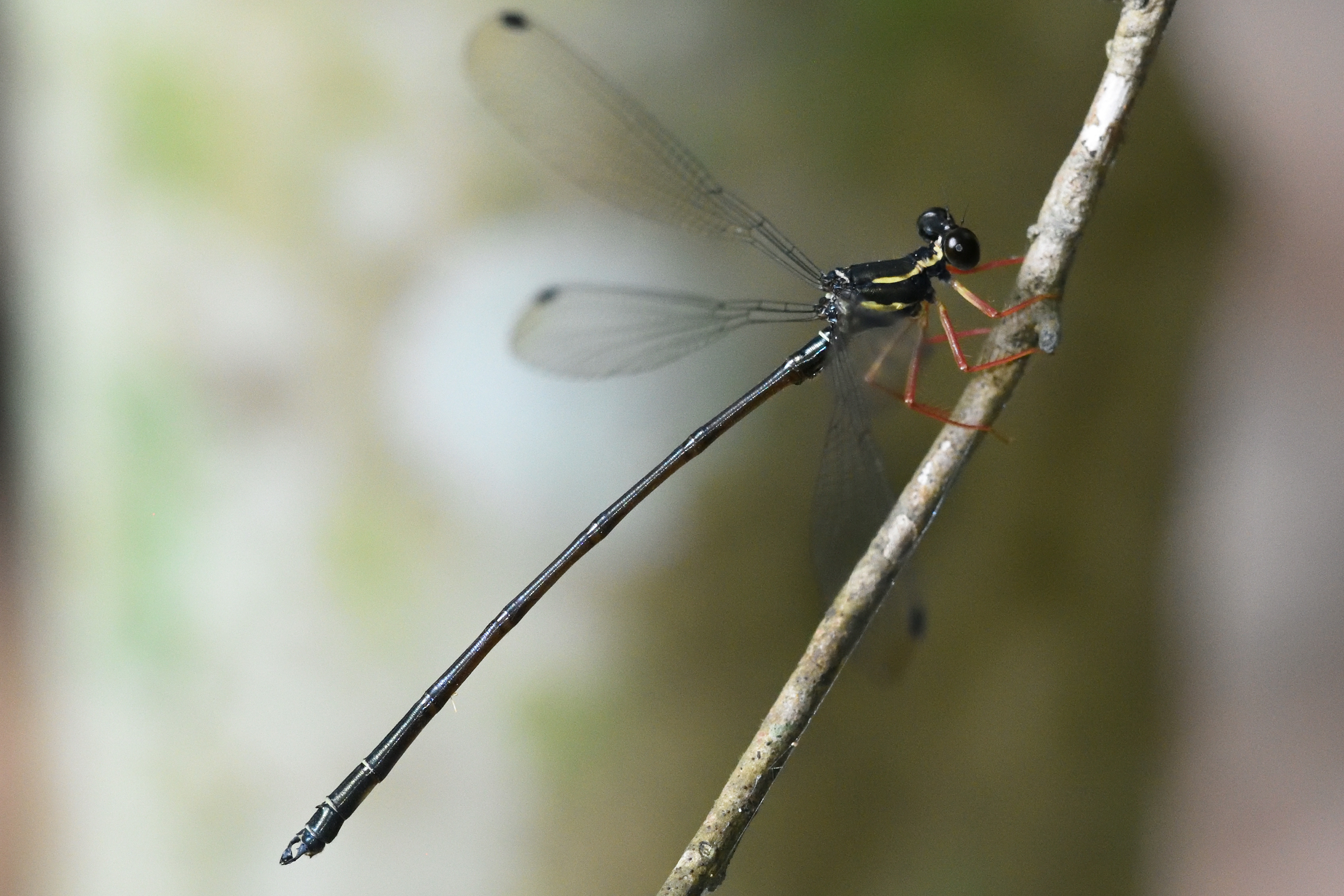
- Rhipidolestes hiraoi

Scientific classification
- Kingdom: Animalia
- Phylum: Arthropoda
- Clade: Pancrustacea
- Class: Insecta
- Order: Odonata
- Suborder: Zygoptera
- Family: Rhipidolestidae
- Genus: Rhipidolestes; Ris, 1912

Synonyms
- Calilestes; Lestomima

= Rhipidolestes =

Genus of dragonflies

Rhipidolestes is a genus of damselflies in the family Rhipidolestidae. The genus occurs in eastern and southeastern Asia, from Myanmar and southern China to Taiwan, Hong Kong and Japan. Species inhabit shaded forest streams and are notable for their long legs, dense wing venation and the distinctive dorsal spine carried by males on the ninth abdominal segment.

== Description ==
Rhipidolestes are medium-sized to fairly large damselflies with a slender build and relatively long legs. The body is generally black with yellow, red or blue markings, while the legs are often conspicuously coloured yellow, orange or red.

The wings are densely veined and usually clear, although some species possess dark wing tips or broad transverse bands. Males are distinguished by a stout dorsal spine on the ninth abdominal segment, a feature unique within the family.

== Habitat and behaviour ==
Species of Rhipidolestes inhabit shaded mountain streams in forested habitats. Adults often perch on twigs and vegetation beside running water and fly slowly through the forest understorey with the wings partly open.

== Taxonomic history ==
Rhipidolestes was established by Friedrich Ris in 1912 for two species from China. In describing the genus, Ris noted that it could not be satisfactorily assigned to any existing genus despite comparisons with numerous Asian and Australasian flatwing damselflies, including Argiolestes, Podolestes, Synlestes and Protolestes.

The genus was subsequently placed in Pseudolestidae, a broadly defined assemblage of unusual damselflies that also included Pseudolestes, Hypolestes, Rimanella and several other genera. Molecular phylogenetic studies later showed that these genera do not form a natural group.

Dijkstra et al. (2014) recognised Rhipidolestes and several related Asian genera as a distinct lineage but left them as incertae sedis pending further study. Bybee et al. (2021) subsequently recovered these genera as a well-supported clade and placed them in the family Rhipidolestidae.

== Species ==
The following species are currently placed in Rhipidolestes:

- Rhipidolestes aculeatus Ris, 1912
- Rhipidolestes alleni Wilson, 2000
- Rhipidolestes amamiensis Ishida, 2005
- Rhipidolestes asatoi Asahina, 1994
- Rhipidolestes bastiaani Zhu & Yang, 1998
- Rhipidolestes chaoi Wilson, 2004
- Rhipidolestes cyanoflavus Wilson, 2000
- Rhipidolestes fascia Zhou, 2003
- Rhipidolestes hiraoi Yamamoto, 1955
- Rhipidolestes janetae Wilson, 1997
- Rhipidolestes jucundus Lieftinck, 1948
- Rhipidolestes laui Wilson & Reels, 2003
- Rhipidolestes lii Zhou, 2003
- Rhipidolestes malaisei Lieftinck, 1948
- Rhipidolestes nectans (Needham, 1929)
- Rhipidolestes okinawanus Asahina, 1951
- Rhipidolestes owadai Asahina, 1997
- Rhipidolestes pallidistigma (Fraser, 1926)
- Rhipidolestes rubripes (Navás, 1936)
- Rhipidolestes shozoi Ishida, 2005
- Rhipidolestes truncatidens Schmidt, 1931
- Rhipidolestes yakusimensis Asahina, 1951
- Rhipidolestes yangbingi Davies, 1998

== Etymology ==
The genus name Rhipidolestes is derived from the Greek ῥιπίς (rhipis, "fan") and Lestes, a common suffix in damselfly names. Ris stated that the name refers to the distinctive fan-like arrangement of the wing venation, formed by the regular divergence of the principal veins and their intermediate sectors.
