= Thomas Rider =

Thomas Rider may refer to:

- Thomas Rider (MP for Kent) (1785–1847)
- Thomas Rider (MP for Windsor), 16th century MP for Windsor
- Thomas Rider (MP for Maidstone) (c. 1648 - by Sep 1704), MP for Maidstone

== See also ==
- Thomas Ryder (disambiguation)
