= Tom McCahill =

American journalist

Thomas Jay McCahill III (June 21, 1907 – May 10, 1975) was an automotive journalist, born the grandson of a wealthy attorney in Larchmont, New York. McCahill graduated from Yale University with a degree in fine arts. (McCahill's father had been a football all-American at Yale). He is credited with, amongst other things, the creation of the "0 to 60" acceleration measurement now universally accepted in automotive testing. He became a salesman for Marmon and in the mid-1930s operated dealerships in Manhattan and Palm Springs, featuring Rolls-Royce, Jaguar, and other high-line luxury cars. The Great Depression and his father's alcoholism wiped out his family's fortune.

== Journalist and automobile critic ==
After graduating from Yale, McCahill managed and later owned Murray's Garage in New York City. During the war he wrote articles on a variety of subjects for magazines such as Popular Science, Reader's Digest and Mechanix Illustrated (M.I.). Hitting on the idea that an auto-starved post-wartime public might be interested in articles on new cars, he sold the concept to Mechanix Illustrated in February 1946, first reporting on his own 1946 Ford. His opinions were fearless and this endeared him to some in the automotive world but created enemies too. Ever the sportsman—at six foot two and 250 pounds—he once fought off goons hired by (as was believed at the time) General Motors. It is alleged that he sent two to the hospital and the third running.

McCahill was a personal friend of Walter P. Chrysler and appreciated the handling and performance characteristics of Chrysler Corporation cars in the late 1950s and 1960s, which included many advanced engineering features such as front torsion-bar suspensions (combined with rear multi-leaf springs) for flatter cornering, powerful V8 engine options across the board and positive-shifting three-speed TorqueFlite automatic transmissions. In a 1959 road test of the Plymouth Sport Fury (which he referred to as the "Sports Fury"), he claimed that the torsion bar suspensions were the finest in America. Few European sedans, said McCahill, could match the handling performance of the Plymouth.

On the other hand, many of McCahill's opinions about vehicles were far less favorable. For example, he reported in a 1949 road test that the new Dodge, with its Fluid Drive transmission, was a "dog." He considered early 1950s Chevrolets mundane and utilitarian.

== On the road ==
On many of his earlier road tests, his wife Cynthia would accompany him as his photographer and almost always his black Labrador Retriever, "Boji". His later assistant was professional driver and photographer Jim McMichael who was photographed sitting—or lying—in the trunk of so many test cars McCahill eventually began calling him the " official trunk tester".

== His prose ==
McCahill frequently used extreme metaphors and similes in his prose. For example, in Mechanix Illustrated he described the AC Cobra as "hairier than a Borneo gorilla in a raccoon suit". He proclaimed the ride of a 1957 Pontiac to be as "smooth as a prom queen's thighs". The 1957 Ford "cornered as flat as a mailman's feet" and the 1954 De Soto is "as solid as the Rock of Gibraltar and just as fast." He described one model of Studebaker's gray-painted hubcaps as a feature "only an engineer could love." Whenever McCahill tested an Audi, he would say "the four rings put it between Ballantine's (a beer with 3 rings as its logo) and the Olympics (5 rings).

== Racing ==
In 1952 McCahill entered his own Jaguar Mark VII sedan in the Daytona Beach NASCAR speed trials and won in the sedan class. Each year he attended and reported on world-renowned speed events, especially the Le Mans 24 Hour in France. He purchased the first Thunderbird built and raced it successfully in the 1955 Daytona speed trials. The Tom McCahill trophy was named for him. As director of the yearly speed trials at Daytona beach, he was responsible for overseeing the rules as well as the safety of the drivers and spectators. He was a personal friend of Briggs Cunningham and drove the fastest cars in the world.

== Effect ==
McCahill reported in detail on every car imported to the U.S. during the early 1950s, all the while ridiculing the U.S. automakers for their excesses, including soft suspensions ("Jello suspensions" as he referred to them) and poor handling qualities. An example is provided by one of the first road tests of the 1958 Edsel in the September 1957 issue of Mechanix Illustrated: McCahill criticized the standard suspension as being too "horsey-back" and strongly recommended that Edsel buyers "pony up" a few extra bucks for the optional, heavy-duty (i.e. export) suspension package, which included heavier springs and shocks. He went so far as to tell his readers that "I wouldn't own one except with the export kit; without stiffer suspension, a car with so much performance (his test car had the 345-horsepower, 410 cubic-inch V8) could prove similar to opening a Christmas basket full of King Cobras in a small room with the lights out".

McCahill was in favor of lifting the Automobile Manufacturer's Association ban on factory backed stock car racing; although the ban was agreed upon by GM, Ford and Chrysler in June 1957, manufacturers continued under-the-table efforts to provide performance parts and engines to racing teams or performance-car enthusiasts. McCahill chose to live in Florida as its climate permitted owning such cars as his Jaguar sedan, as corrosion problems inherent with this type of car would have been compounded by the Eastern climate.

== On the Chevrolet Corvair ==
McCahill conducted and reported on the first road test of the Chevrolet Corvair in 1959. In the presence of Zora Arkus-Duntov, chief engineer of the Corvair project, McCahill ran the car at speed on the G.M. testing grounds. McCahill reported that he was pleased with the handling characteristics and that the Corvair handled better than the 1959 Porsche. This conflicts with the assertions by Ralph Nader in his book Unsafe at Any Speed criticizing the Corvair's handling. At the time Nader wrote Unsafe at Any Speed, it is to be remembered he had neither an automotive engineering degree nor a driver's license. In response to Nader's book, McCahill tried to get a 1963 Corvair to flip, at one point sliding sideways into a street curb, but could not turn over the vehicle.

== Favorite vehicles ==
In the 600 road tests he performed and reported on, his favorite cars were the 1953 Bentley Continental and the 1957–1962 Imperial, each model year of which he owned as his personal vehicles. In 1950 he purchased a new Ford and proceeded to acquire the assistance of Andy Granatelli in "hopping it up" by switching to high-performance heads and manifolding. He then tested the car extensively and noticed a 90-mile-an-hour cruising speed. The car became known as the "M.I. Ford" as it was frequently featured in the magazine. He purchased a new 1952 Cadillac Series 62 sedan which he eventually raced in NASCAR speed week events. He also purchased new and reported on the '54 Jeep CJ3A, stating that while his Lincoln was the finest road car available at the time, in the end, the Jeep was the best idea that mankind had ever made. He claimed a Jeep would outrun a contemporary M.G. McCahill purchased the first Ford Thunderbird built in 1954 and proceeded to race the car at Daytona Beach.

== "Sounding Off" ==
In a 1958 Mechanix Illustrated article McCahill accused the U.S. auto industry of causing the Recession of 1958 and poor auto sales during that year by standardizing styling and eliminating factory- or factory-sanctioned racing. He focused on AMC's George Romney, who claimed that the Rambler handled better than U.S. full-size makes. McCahill performed tests to prove him wrong. He was at odds with Walter Reuther of the U.A.W. over the issue of poor quality in U.S. cars and the fact that European imports – at the time SAAB and Volvo in particular – were of high quality, outstanding performers and no more costly than a good used car for those who could not afford a new domestic car. McCahill railed against unfair trade with Canada and Europe. He demanded that the U.S. stop accepting imports and, in lieu of war reparations, force England, Canada and France (where one could purchase an English or German car, but no U.S. makes) to accept the forced sale of hundreds of thousands of used U.S. cars, a plan which he claimed would increase the sale of new vehicles by more than six million annually over the following five years, thus significantly accelerating the U.S. economy. McCahill had become Mechanix Illustrated‘s public face, and the industry quickly realized that his review could make or break a product instantly. When he tested the 1948 Oldsmobile Futuramic 98 powered by a flat-head eight-cylinder engine of prewar design, he claimed that depressing the accelerator was like "Stepping on a wet sponge". General Motors was incensed over his review of the '48 Olds and scores of angry letters from the corporation, as well as from Olds dealers and owners, came into MI's 'office demanding his firing. However, it was widely known that McCahill's report motivated GM into development of Oldsmobile's new overhead-valve, high-compression "Rocket V8" engine, which made its début the following year in the 1949 "98." The format of the engine was filtered down to the smaller and lighter body/chassis used for Oldsmobile's lowest-price "76" series (powered by six-cylinder engines) and to create the Olds "Rocket 88." The Rocket V8 performed even better than in the bigger and heavier 98, thereby creating a whole new image for Olds and set the stage for similar designed V8 engines throughout Detroit over the next few years.

== Personal details ==
McCahill was married a number of times but died without issue. In a 1956 interview with Playboy magazine McCahill stated that he had "more cash than hair". The statement was in response to a question as to how he had been photographed in two separate issues of Mechanix Illustrated with two different wives. McCahill had homes in Florida and New York, where he would receive cars to test. He traveled all over the United States and Europe to facilitate testing. His stepson with his fourth wife, Brooks Brender, served as McCahill's assistant in his later years. McCahill was a personal friend of band leader Paul Whiteman, with whom he shared his love of hunting and fishing. Every year, McCahill would make a ten-day boating trip from his home in New York to his home in Florida aboard his thirty-foot Egg Harbor Cruiser the "Rooster" (McCahill was forced to sell the Rooster in 1967 to pay off back taxes to the IRS). McCahill was an avid fisherman, hunter and deep-sea diver.

At age 68, McCahill died at the Daytona Community Hospital on May 10, 1975. Mechanix Illustrated never publicly acknowledged his death, because his name was synonymous with it. He "amounted to the franchise" and management never wanted to admit he was gone. For a while, they ran a column called "McCahill Reports", which was ghostwritten by Brender. At the time of his death, he was believed to be the only living descendant of the Scottish highwayman Rob Roy. According to Canadian automotive historian Bill Vance, McCahill had lost a leg that became gangrenous after a thorn penetrated it during a duck hunt, forcing its amputation.

== Books ==
- Tom McCahill, The Modern Sports Car, Prentice Hall, Englewood Cliffs, NJ, 1954
- Tom McCahill, Tom McCahill's Car Owner Handbook, Arco Publishing Co., New York, 1956.
- Tom McCahill, Today's Sports and Competition Cars, Prentice Hall, Englewood Cliffs, NJ, 1959.
- Tom McCahill, What You Should Know About Cars, Fawcett Crest Books, Circa 1963.
