= Inside Soap =

British magazine covering soap operas

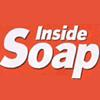

- First issue cover (October 1992)
- Editor: Sarah Ellis
- Categories: Soap operas
- Frequency: Weekly
- Circulation: 42,215 (ABC 2023); Print
- First issue: October 1992
- Company: Hearst Magazines UK
- Country: United Kingdom
- Based in: London
- Language: English
- Website: www.insidesoap.co.uk
- ISSN: 0966-8497

Inside Soap is a weekly soap opera and television listings magazine published in the United Kingdom. The magazine is currently released every Tuesday. It covers storylines of British and Australian soap operas that are broadcast in the United Kingdom, including Coronation Street, Doctors, EastEnders, Emmerdale, Hollyoaks, Home and Away and Neighbours as well as drama Casualty. Since 1996, the magazine has hosted the Inside Soap Awards ceremony each year.

== History ==
=== Profile and early years ===
Inside Soap was launched in Australia in 1992, published by the Sydney-based Attic Futura. Attic Futura was sold to Pacific Magazines in 1993 by which time the magazine had been successfully launched in the UK. The magazine was then relaunched in Australia in 1998.

In 1996, the British Inside Soap changed from a monthly to a fortnightly publication.

In September 2002, Hachette Filipacchi began publishing the magazine after the company purchased Attic Futura. In late 2003, Hachette Filipacchi decided to increase their output of Inside Soap and began publishing it weekly. The publisher's decision to publish weekly strengthened sales and by September 2005, the magazine reached 182,618 units in circulation.

Each year, the Inside Soap Awards ceremony is held, where awards are given to the cast and crew of the soaps. In September 2004, the Inside Soap Awards were broadcast on Sky's television channel Living TV.

Editors of the magazine have included Vicky Mayer, Jonathan Bowman, Steven Murphy and Gary Gillatt.

Inside Soap prints stories covering all soap operas broadcast on British television in detail. It includes a feature to inform readers of dates different stories occur titled "what happens when". It also includes terrestrial and digital television listings.

=== Circulation ===
By 1994, the magazine's circulation had reached around 120,000. In 1995, Inside Soap's publicity claimed that it was the fastest growing consumer magazine in the United Kingdom. In August 1996, it was announced that Inside Soap sales had risen. From January to June 1996, they had gained a fifty-four percent rise in sales according to year on year comparison data. By 1998, it was a market leader in its sales category and by September 2003 it still held its top ranking position.

In the 2000s and 2010s, Inside Soap remained one of the most circulated television listings magazines in the UK. It endured a sales decline on a yearly basis. In February 2008, it was reported that Inside Soap was the seventh best selling television listings magazine in the UK. Its circulation grew by 5.7 per cent during the previous period to 200,045 copies sold per issue. It's sales fell to 195,125 for the first half of 2008, which was reported to be a 1.9 per cent loss. The sales declined by a further 5.9 per cent (188,273 sales per issue) for the latter half. It was also the sixth best selling listings magazine of the year. Inside Soap's sales share fell by 5.8 per cent with 177,304 sales in the second half of 2009. For the first half of 2011, the magazine's sales dipped by 5.7 per cent to 165,022 copies sold. This made TV easy the sixth best-selling magazine from the genre. In the latter half of 2012, sales fell to 150,270, a 4.2 per cent drop. By 2013, it was still the sixth best selling listings magazine, down 7.7 per cent selling 142,682 copies in the first six months.

Its print sales decline continued in the 2020s. In 2022, it shifted an average of 51,300 per issue. In 2023, its average sales per issue were 42,215 with a 17.7 per cent decline on the previous year.
