= Agriomorpha =

Scientific classification
- Kingdom: Animalia
- Phylum: Arthropoda
- Clade: Pancrustacea
- Class: Insecta
- Order: Odonata
- Suborder: Zygoptera
- Family: Rhipidolestidae
- Genus: Agriomorpha; May, 1933

Genus of damselflies

Agriomorpha is a genus of insects in the damselfly suborder Zygoptera, family Rhipidolestidae.

== Species ==
- Agriomorpha fusca May, 1933
- Agriomorpha xinglongensis (Wilson & Reels, 2001)
