= World's Funniest =

- Genre: Reality
- Based on: FailArmy by Jukin Media
- Directed by: Alex Rudzinski
- Presented by: Terry Crews
- Country of origin: United States
- No. of seasons: 2
- No. of episodes: 18

Production
- Executive producers: Nicolle Yaron; Jonathan Skogmo; Allen Shapiro; Mark Mahan; Josh Entman
- Running time: Approx. 60 minutes
- Production companies: Dick Clark Productions; Jukin Media

Original release
- Network: Fox
- Release: January 16 – December 18, 2015

World's Funniest, formerly World's Funniest Fails, is an American reality television series produced by Dick Clark Productions and Jukin Media which made its debut on Fox on January 16, 2015. Hosted by Terry Crews, the funny videos show was inspired by the Jukin-owned YouTube channel FailArmy, in addition to Jukin's other properties. A panel of comedians views and analyzes the videos, which are divided into categories. In the first season each panel member selected a favorite in each category. Crews chooses a video in each category and decides on the "Fail of the Week" at the end. The panel member who picked the "Fail of the Week" receives the trophy. The show states in a disclaimer that viewer submissions are not accepted (as the majority of the videos were licensed to the show by Jukin); unlike America's Funniest Home Videos, this show makes no claim as to whether people in the videos were hurt by their reckless behavior.

The show was picked up for a second season to begin in the fall of 2015, but they were expected to be 8 or 9 unaired episodes ordered in February. The second season began airing November 6, 2015. The name was shortened, Crews said, because not everything funny is necessarily a fail. Also, the panel of judges no longer nominated favorite videos.

Although not officially cancelled, Fox has not ordered a third season of the series.

The show has no direct connection to another past Fox show of the near-same title, The World's Funniest!, which aired on the network from 1998 until 2000 and was produced by Brad Lachman Productions.

== Reception ==
Brain Lowry of Variety said World's Funniest Fails "tries to concoct a game element around the clips that never really makes sense", but "if the goal was to develop a series that exhibits even a shred of originality or ingenuity, as 'Fails of the Week' go, hey, it looks like we already have a winner!"

== Episodes ==
=== Season 1 (2015) ===
No.	Title	Original release date	U.S. viewers (millions)
1	"Dance Like No Paramedics Are Watching"	January 16, 2015	3.32
2	"Trees: Man's Only Natural Predator"	January 23, 2015	3.04
3	"Horses: They Just Don't Like Us"	January 30, 2015	3.07
4	"Dogs and Babies: Together At Last!"	February 6, 2015	2.73
5	"Gravity: It Kinda Sucks"	February 13, 2015	2.39
6	"Gotta Sing! Gotta Dance! Gotta Fail!"	February 20, 2015	2.56
7	"Baby Got Fail"	February 27, 2015	2.81
8	"Kids Survive the Darndest Things"	March 6, 2015	2.77
9	"All Creatures Great and Uncoordinated"	March 13, 2015	2.70
10	"Animals: Nature's Biggest Jerks"	June 23, 2015	1.64

=== Season 2 (2015) ===
No.	Title	Original release date	U.S. viewers (millions)
1	"The Grating Outdoors"	November 6, 2015	2.21
Panelists: Ross Mathews, Natasha Leggero, Josh Wolf
2	"Internet Yearbook"	November 13, 2015	2.17
Panelists: Sherri Shepherd, Tone Bell, Jen Kirkman
3	"Un-Dynamic Duos"	November 20, 2015	2.24
Panelists: Wayne Brady, Jessimae Peluso, Josh Wolf
4	"Dogs: Nature's Clowns"	November 27, 2015	1.81
Panelists: Margaret Cho, Jeff Dye, Erik Griffin
5	"Low Selfie Esteem"	December 4, 2015	2.02
Panelists: Jim Jefferies, Dana Gould, Iliza Shlesinger
6	"Cat's Entertainment"	December 11, 2015	1.92
Panelists: Godfrey, Fortune Feimster, Erik Griffin
7	"Meltdowns"	December 17, 2015	1.78
Panelists: April Richardson, Loni Love, Julian McCullough
8	"Sibling Rivalry"	December 18, 2015	1.79
Panelists: Arden Myrin, Sarah Colonna, Ross Matthews
