= Jill Silsby =

British entomologist (1925–2023)

- Silsby in the Arabian Desert in 1977
- Born: 25 February 1925
- Died: March 2023
- Occupations: Entomologist, author, zoologist

Jill Silsby (1925 – March 2023) was a British entomologist and author, specialising in the study of dragonflies and damselflies (collectively, odonata). She also wrote about birds.

== Early life ==
Jillian Dorothy, née Lewis, was born on 25 February 1925 and baptised on 18 March that year at St. James' Church, Delhi, India. Her father Harold Victor Lewis (1887–1945, eventually Major-General, awarded DSO, MC and bar), was an officer in the Indian Army. Her mother was Joyce.

In 1940 she and John Lewis, aged 13, sailed from Southampton to Colombo, en route to India, without their parents, on the P&O ship Strathmaver.

== Career ==
Her 1980 book Inland Birds of Saudi Arabia had a foreword by Philip, Duke of Edinburgh.

She was best known for her 2001 book Dragonflies of the World. In it, she described and named the dragonfly family Rhipidolestidae. Reviewer Forrest L. Mitchell considered the book "both a fine introduction and an excellent resource on these insects."

Silsby was an important figure in the British Dragonfly Society (BDS), serving as publicity officer and fund-raising officer, and later as secretary. She was also the society's liaison with the International Odonatological Foundation, Societas Internationalis Odonatologica. In 1997, she became a founding member of the Worldwide Dragonfly Association, for whom she subsequently served as honorary secretary and treasurer and, for ten years, as newsletter editor.

The dragonfly species Idomacromia jillianae, "Jill's shadowcruiser", was named after her in 2004 by Klaas-Douwe Dijkstra and John Kisakye, who wrote:

This species is named in honour of a unique lady in odonatology, Jill Silsby, who has done so much for this field of science and has produced a handbook which is of great value to all workers (Silsby 2001).

Silsby was awarded honorary membership of the BDS "in recognition of her outstanding contribution to dragonfly knowledge and conservation both in Britain and the world".

== Personal life ==
She married Ronald ("Ronnie") M. Silsby in Wycombe, Buckinghamshire, in 1949.

In 1956 the couple are recorded sailing from Liverpool to Bombay aboard the Cilicia, with three children, twin girls born in 1950 and a boy born in 1952. Ronnie was described as a scientist. He later served as treasurer alongside her in the BDS.

== Death and legacy ==
Silsby died in March 2023, aged 98.

Dijkstra dedicated his 2025 book Dragonflies and Damselflies of the World: A Guide to Their Diversity with the words:

This book is dedicated to the popularization of Odonata... I also wrote it in memory of Jill Silsby, who inspired us all with the publication of her landmark Dragonflies of the World almost a quarter century ago.

== Bibliography ==
- Inland Birds of Saudi Arabia. Jeddah: Immel. 1980. ISBN 978-0907151005.
- Wings in the Garden. Reader's Digest. 1988.
- Dragonflies of the World. CSIRO Publishing. 2001. ISBN 1-56098-959-9.
