= Family Life (Wenner Media magazine) =

American parenting magazine

- Family Life cover
- Categories: Family magazine
- Frequency: Monthly
- Founder: Jann Wenner
- Founded: 1993
- Final issue: 2001
- Company: Hachette Filipacchi
- Country: United States
- Based in: New York City
- Language: English

Family Life was an American parenting magazine founded by Rolling Stone founder Jann Wenner of Wenner Media in 1993 for "baby boomers who once raised hell and are now raising kids".

The first editor-in-chief was Nancy Evans.

== Overview ==
Wenner's own family situation led to him selling the magazine to Hachette Filipacchi in March 1995. At Hachette it was added to the stable on the same floor as Elle Decor and Metropolitan Home.

In the first six months following sale to Hachette, and under new editor Peter Herbst, Family Life saw a boost of 71.7 percent in circulation.

== Acquisition ==
The magazine was acquired by Time Warner in 1999, but in 2001 closed down, alongside Asia Week and short-lived tech title On magazine.
