= Jukin Media =

Viral video licensing company

- Type: Subsidiary
- Industry: Entertainment, digital media
- Founded: 2009; 17 years ago
- Founders: Jonathan Skogmo; Aldo Carrascoso; Josh Entman
- Headquarters: Los Angeles, California, U.S.
- Key people: Lee Essner (president and Chief Operating Officer); Josh Entman (Cofounder and Chief Development Officer)
- Brands: FailArmy, JukinVideo, World's Funniest, The Pet Collective, Weather Spy
- Parent: Trusted Media Brands
- Website: jukinmedia.com

Jukin Media, Inc. is an American entertainment company that operates by identifying shareable or otherwise compelling user-generated videos, negotiating with the video owners, and then licensing the videos for third-party use and/or featuring the videos in its own productions. The company was founded in 2009 by Jonathan Skogmo, Aldo Carrascoso and Josh Entman and is headquartered in Los Angeles, California.

== History ==
Jukin Media's Co-Founder and CEO Jonathan Skogmo conceived of the idea for the company while working as a video researcher and producer for the television show Country Fried Home Videos. After realizing there was an opportunity to aggregate and monetize digital clips that appeared on YouTube and other online video platforms, he together with Aldo Carrascoso and Josh Entman started Jukin Media in 2009 from his West Hollywood apartment.

Between 2013 and 2019, the company raised several rounds of funding totaling $4.2 million from investors including, among others, Bertelsmann Digital Media Investments, Peter Guber, Maker Studios, and Samsung Ventures.

In 2014, Jukin partnered with Maker Studios, giving Maker Studios access to Jukin's library of video clips, and giving Jukin access to Maker's operational resources. The partnership also resulted in the launch of a dedicated website for FailArmy, Jukin's owned and operated entertainment brand. In August 2017, the company announced that it had paid more than $15 million to viral video creators.

On October 16, 2018, Sinclair Broadcast Group signed an agreement with Jukin to assume operational responsibilities for TBD, effective immediately. The agreement will also result in content supplied by Jukin being expanded on TBD’s programming lineup.

On August 11, 2020, Jukin announced partnerships with BroadbandTV and Fullscreen to provide their rosters of influencers and YouTubers exclusive discounts to Jukin’s library, dedicated customer support, and early access to new features.

In August 2021, Jukin was acquired by Trusted Media Brands, a parent company of Reader's Digest.

== Operations ==
Jukin Media operational model involves discovering, acquiring, and licensing user-generated video clips. Besides licensing those video clips for use by advertisers, digital publishers, TV shows, and other entities, it also provides licensing and clearance services to production companies and media networks. Additionally, Jukin Media produces and owns a variety of multimedia channels on media platforms such as YouTube, cable television, and broadcast television.

=== Licensing model ===
Through a process of review that utilizes proprietary software and manual sorting, Jukin identifies videos that might go viral and then negotiates with the video's owner to establish a licensing agreement with that user. Jukin pays video owners for every video, whether by one-time payment or ongoing revenue share. Once Jukin has acquired a clip, it monetizes the clip with advertisements and integrates the clip into its library of videos that are available for third-party use. After being acquired, the video clips are licensed to third-parties that distribute them through a variety of channels including social media, television, and websites.

=== Notable examples ===
One notable example of the type of videos that Jukin Media seeks out is Jared Frank Kicked in the Head, a video depicting a Canadian man filming himself being kicked in the head by the driver of a passing passenger train in Peru. As of August 2015, the video, licensed by Jukin Media, had reached nearly 38 million views and had netted the video's creator approximately $30,000.

Similar reception occurred for Pizza Rat, a viral video depicting a rat carrying a large slice of pizza to its home on the New York City Subway. The video’s creator Matt Little signed with Jukin Media when the video had received just a few thousand views; within a few weeks it reached over 8 million views on YouTube, and was featured on many popular TV shows and websites, including The Late Show with Stephen Colbert and Conan.

Other videos that Jukin Media has been involved with include Hero Cat and Chewbacca Mask Lady, which became the most watched Facebook Live video ever recorded.

In addition to viral videos, Jukin Media’s business model has contributed to widely circulated situations where content removal has occurred. In June 2020, Jukin Media issued a DMCA takedown notice on then-US President Donald Trump's Twitter account for unauthorized usage of a viral video; Twitter removed the content.

== Television programs ==
Jukin Media had also produced two programs in conjunction with MRC 2 Dick Clark Productions International to syndicating both programs worldwide.

=== Now That's Funny! ===
Jukin Media produces the TV show Now That's Funny! on Britain's Channel 5, which is a family-friendly clip show airing on Sunday nights.

=== FailArmy (TV series) ===
Jukin Media also produces an international TV version of FailArmy. The half-hour comedy based on the popular YouTube channel airs in 221 TV markets worldwide.

The series was broadcast on TBD in the United States.

== Related properties ==
In addition to the company's video services, it is also the producer of World's Funniest on FOX and is the owner and operator of several consumer-facing entertainment brands, including FailArmy, which compiles fail videos and has a subscriber base of approximately 14.5 million users on its YouTube channel and more than 18.4 million fans on its Facebook page as of March 2019, and The Pet Collective, which is a joint venture between Jukin and FremantleMedia's Tiny Riot! studio.

== Controversies ==
In November 2014, Jukin Media sued YouTuber Ray William Johnson and requested the removal of 41 "Equals Three" videos which sampled their content. In February 2016, Jukin Media and Equals Three settled out of court before the jury’s verdict could be revealed to the court. While the verdict in the case remains sealed, members of the jury informed media outlets that the jury unanimously found that Equals Three's usage of Jukin video content was not fair use under U.S. copyright law.

In January 2020, Jukin Media engaged in a public dispute with YouTube channel MxR Plays, where Jukin Media accused the channel of copyright infringement and MxR Plays accused Jukin Media of extortion. Within a few days, Jukin Media and MxR reached an agreement that was satisfactory to both parties. Details of the agreement were not disclosed.
