= Taste of Home =

American media brand centered on food

- Chief Content Officer: Beth Tomkiw
- Publisher: Trusted Media Brands, Inc.
- Total circulation: 1,100,000 (2024)
- Founded: 1993
- Country: USA
- Based in: Milwaukee, Wisconsin
- Website: tasteofhome.com
- ISSN: 1071-5878

Taste of Home is an American media brand centered on food. It is an example of user-generated content in magazines, publishing recipes submitted by home cooks. Taste of Home is owned by Trusted Media Brands, which also owns Reader's Digest, Birds and Blooms and The Family Handyman.

== History ==
The magazine was first published in 1993 with an aim to provide readers with recipes and information geared toward home cooks. It was originally based in Greendale, Wisconsin. Early issues used ingredients that could be found at local American grocery stores. Taste of Home's content now includes ethnic and world cuisine.

Taste of Home produces a variety of special interest publications, cookbooks and recipe collections.

In 2002, Reader's Digest acquired Reiman Publications, Taste of Home's publisher, for $760 million. In 2012, Reader's Digest combined Healthy Cooking with Taste of Home.

In 2013, Taste of Home began hosting Gingerbread BLVD, featuring an interactive, full-scale gingerbread house in New York City created during the holiday season.

As of 2019, Taste of Home had over 12 million readers. In October 2019, Taste of Home released a new edition of Taste of Home: Grandma's Favorites. Also in the fall of 2019, the fifth edition of The Taste of Home Cookbook was released.
