= Quest (Dutch magazine) =

Dutch popular science magazine

- Managing Editor: Bram Mullink
- Former editors: Karlijn van Overbeek (2004–2010); Thomas Hendriks (2010–2017); Sanne Groot Koerkamp (2017–2020); Philip Fontani (2020–2022); Lyn Kuyper (2022–2023)
- Categories: Popular science magazine
- Frequency: Monthly
- Publisher: Hearst Netherlands
- First issue: 1 February 2004; 21 years ago
- Company: Hearst Corporation
- Country: Netherlands
- Based in: Amsterdam
- Language: Dutch
- Website: Quest
- ISSN: 1573-4617
- OCLC: 73596567

Quest is a monthly popular science magazine published by Hearst NL Magazines, located in Amsterdam.

== History and profile ==
Quest was launched in February 2004. The magazine was part of Gruner + Jahr and is published by G+J Uitgevers on a monthly basis.

The headquarters of the magazine is in Amsterdam. The magazine features articles on science and technology with a special reference to nature, health, psychology and history. Target audience of the magazine is people between 20 and 49 years of age. The monthly had several special supplements, Quest Psychologie, Quest Historie, Quest Image and Quest 101.

Karlijn van Overbeek served as the editor-in-chief of the magazine until her death in 2010. Then Thomas Hendriks was appointed to the post.

The magazine is also distributed in Belgium. In 2011 the English version of Quest was launched by Gruner + Jahr in South Africa with the same name. The magazine is published on a bimonthly basis there.

Quest has won the Mercur Magazine Award several times since its start in 2004. The magazine received the award in 2004, in 2007 and in 2009. It was named as the Launch of the Year 2004 and the Magazine of the Year for 2010.

== Circulation ==
In 2010 Quest had a circulation of 198,270 copies. Its circulation was 183,348 copies in 2011 and 178,274 copies in 2012. During the second quarter of 2014 the circulation of the magazine was 155,653 copies.
