= Payment rail =

Term for a payment platform

A payment rail is a payment platform or a payment network that moves money from a payer to a payee. Either party could be a consumer or business, and both parties are able to move funds on the network. Credit card rails are the credit card payment system. Blockchain is considered a newer type of payment rail, as are centralized electronic payment systems such as PayPal, Venmo and Zelle. If the transferred funds are available immediately, a payment rail is referred to as a real-time rail.
