= Veem =

Global payments platform

- Logo used from 2017 to present
- Formerly: Align Commerce
- Company type: Private
- Industry: Payment services
- Founded: San Francisco (2014)
- Founder: Marwan Forzley; Aldo Carrascoso
- Headquarters: San Francisco, United States
- Area served: Global: Europe, United States, Canada, Asia-Pacific, Latin-America
- Key people: Marwan Forzley (CEO)
- Products: International Payments, Domestic Payments, Accounting Integrations, Working Capital, Digital Wallets
- Services: Financial Services
- Website: veem.com

Veem, formerly Align Commerce, is a San Francisco–based online global payments platform founded in 2014 by Marwan Forzley and Aldo Carrascoso. The company uses a payment routing method they refer to as "multi-rail technology," where transactions are routed through different methods, or "rails", such as credit cards, checks, or cryptocurrency.

== History ==
Veem was founded by Marwan Forzley and Aldo Carrascoso in 2014 as Align Commerce. Forzley and Carrascoso came up with the concept to make cross-border payments, "as easy as purchasing a cup of coffee." Veem is integrated with QuickBooks, Xero, NetSuite, Plaid, Zapier and Q2 banking platform.

In April 2020, Veem acted as a front-end component to the Small Business Administration Paycheck Protection Program to facilitate loans and customer support to small businesses as a result of the COVID-19 pandemic.

== Recognition ==
- Veem was listed in the 2018 Forbes Fintech 50.
- Veem was recognized as Quickbooks 2017 Top 10 App of the Year,
- Xero's 2018 Emerging App Partner of the Year,
- Listed as a 2020 top accounting app by Accounting Today.

== Investors ==
Veem's investors include National Australia Bank (NAB) Ventures, GV (Google Ventures), Goldman Sachs, Softbank's SBI Investment Co., Ltd., Kleiner Perkins Caufield Byers, Silicon Valley Bank, Truist Ventures, MUFG Innovation Partners, AB Ventures, Paper Excellence, Myer Family Investments, Trend Forward Capital, and EPAY.
