= The Family Handyman =

American home-improvement magazine

- Editor in Chief: Ken Collier
- Categories: home and garden, DIY, home improvement
- Frequency: 10 issues/year
- Total circulation: 724,700 (2024)
- Founded: 1951
- Company: Trusted Media Brands, Inc.
- Country: United States
- Based in: Eagan, Minnesota
- Language: English
- Website: www.familyhandyman.com
- ISSN: 0014-7230

The Family Handyman is an American home-improvement magazine, owned by Trusted Media Brands, Inc.

== History ==
The magazine was founded in 1951 by Universal Publishing & Distributing. UPD sold the magazine to Webb Publishing in 1977 to pay down debts that would ultimately finish off the company. Robert Maxwell acquired Webb in 1987, and sold the magazine to the Reader's Digest Association that year.

== Content ==
Every issue features contributions from members of a crew of more than 1,100 reader-volunteer Field Editors. Monthly features include: Car + Garage, Stuff We Love, Home Care + Repair, Handy Hints, Top Ten Tips, Pro Tips, DIY Quiz, and Great Goofs. Both magazine and web content provides resources for do-it-yourself homeowners, including how-to instructions for improving homes, yards and vehicles.

The Family Handyman also publishes several special interest publications, tablet editions of the magazine, a DIY Tip Genius app, and The Family Handyman DIY University, an online curriculum of DIY courses.

== Digital ==
Professional handymen and amateur DIYers can find both new and archived magazine content on The Family Handyman website, which focuses on how-to articles, woodworking project plans, home repairs, bathroom remodeling, kitchen remodeling, do it yourself (DIY) tutorials, and lawn care.

The magazine also maintains a digital presence on Facebook, Twitter, Pinterest, Google+, and in free, weekly email newsletters.

== See also ==
=== Competitors ===
- This Old House Magazine
- Better Homes and Gardens
- HGTV Magazine
