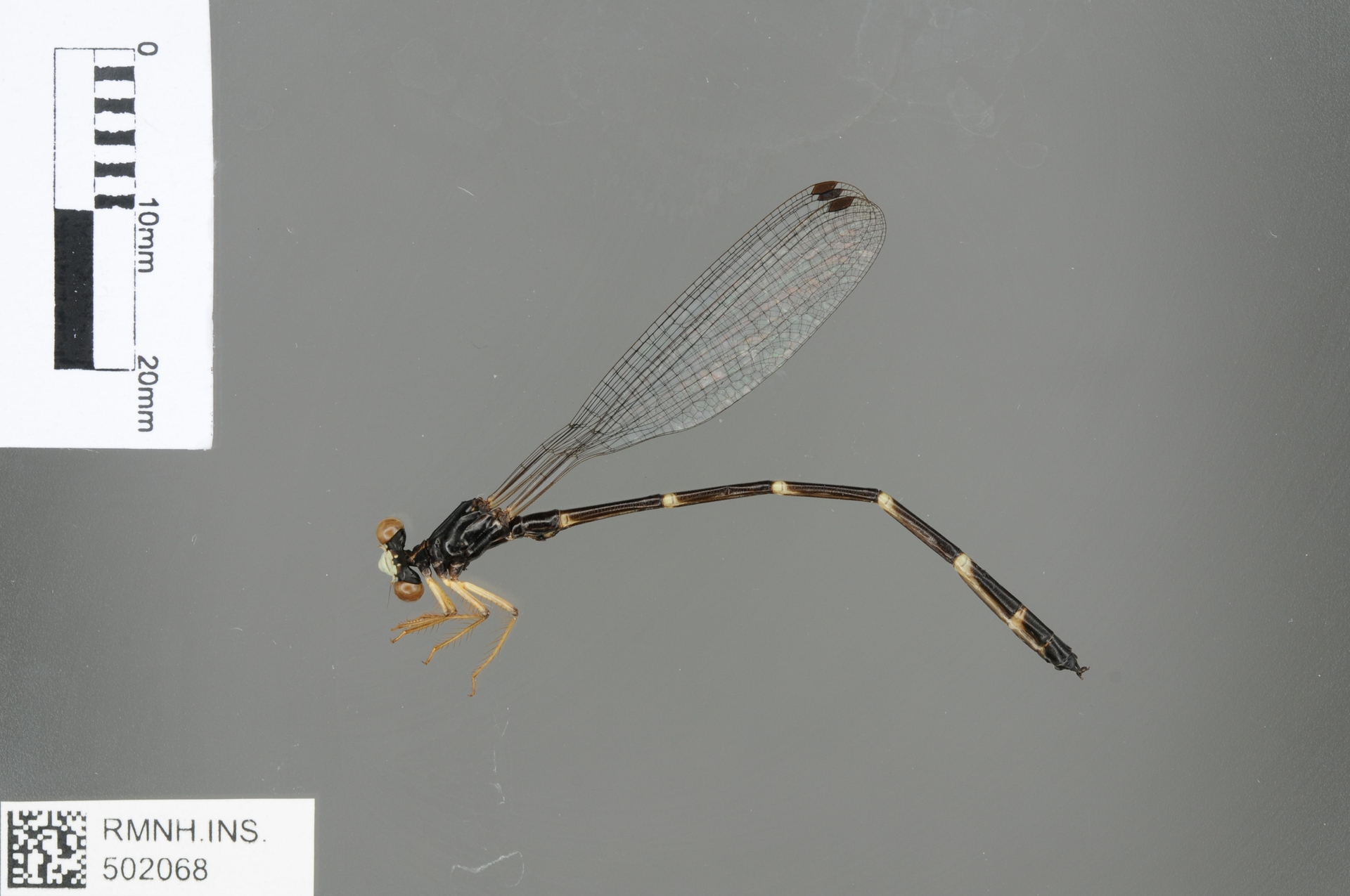
- Burmargiolestes laidlawi

Scientific classification
- Kingdom: Animalia
- Phylum: Arthropoda
- Clade: Pancrustacea
- Class: Insecta
- Order: Odonata
- Suborder: Zygoptera
- Superfamily: Amphipterygoidea
- Family: Rhipidolestidae; Silsby, 2001

Genera
- Agriomorpha; Bornargiolestes; Burmargiolestes; Rhipidolestes
- Distribution of Rhipidolestidae

= Rhipidolestidae =

Family of damselflies

Rhipidolestidae is a family of damselflies in the superfamily Amphipterygoidea. Members of the family occur in eastern and southeastern Asia, where they inhabit forest streams and associated rainforest habitats. The family contains four genera and is characterised by long legs, dense wing venation and, in some species, striking dark markings on the wings.

== Description ==
Rhipidolestids are medium-sized to fairly large damselflies with a slender build and relatively long legs. The wings are usually clear, although some species of Rhipidolestes possess dark wing tips or broad transverse bands. The body is predominantly black, often with yellow, red or blue markings on the face and abdomen, while the legs are frequently conspicuously coloured pale yellow, orange or red.

Species of Rhipidolestes are notable for a stout dorsal spine on the ninth abdominal segment of males, a feature not known from the other genera in the family.

The larvae of Rhipidolestes possess sac-like caudal gills ending in slender terminal filaments and are typically found among moss, wet rocks and streamside vegetation.

== Habitat and behaviour ==
Members of the family inhabit forested mountain streams. Adults are often encountered in shaded areas beside flowing water, while larvae occur among mosses, damp rocks and streamside vegetation. Females lay eggs in moss growing on stream banks and rocks close to water.

== Taxonomic history ==
The type genus Rhipidolestes was described by Friedrich Ris in 1912. In establishing the genus, Ris noted that it could not readily be placed in any of the recognised genera of the time, despite comparisons with Argiolestes, Podopteryx, Podolestes, Amphilestes, Synlestes, Chlorolestes, Neurolestes, Nesolestes and Protolestes. He regarded its distinctive wing venation, with veins diverging in a regular fan-like pattern, as one of its most unusual features.

A family-group name based on Rhipidolestes was first introduced by Jill Silsby in 2001 as Rhipidolestinae. The genera now placed in Rhipidolestidae were historically assigned to Megapodagrionidae and were later included by Fraser (1957) in a broadly defined Pseudolestidae together with several other unusual damselfly genera from Asia, the Caribbean and South America. Molecular phylogenetic studies subsequently showed that these taxa do not form a natural group. Dijkstra et al. (2014) treated these genera as incertae sedis pending further study, but Bybee et al. (2021) reinstated Rhipidolestidae for the group and formally recognised it as a family.

== Genera ==
The following genera are currently placed in Rhipidolestidae:

- Agriomorpha May, 1933
- Bornargiolestes Kimmins, 1936
- Burmargiolestes Kennedy, 1925
- Rhipidolestes Ris, 1912

== Etymology ==
The family name Rhipidolestidae is derived from its type genus Rhipidolestes, with the standard zoological suffix -idae used for animal families.

The genus name Rhipidolestes is derived from the Greek ῥιπίς (rhipis, "fan") and Lestes, a common suffix in damselfly names. Ris stated that the name refers to the distinctive fan-like arrangement of the wing venation, formed by the regular divergence of the principal veins and their intermediate sectors.
