= Birds & Blooms =

American magazine

- Editor: Kirsten Sweet
- Categories: wildlife magazine
- Frequency: Bi-monthly
- Total circulation: 1,251,201 (2013)
- Founded: 1995
- Company: Trusted Media Brands, Inc.
- Country: United States
- Based in: Milwaukee, Wisconsin
- Language: English
- Website: Birds & Blooms
- ISSN: 1084-5305

Birds & Blooms is an American magazine about backyard plants, birds, butterflies, and other creatures.

== History and profile ==
Birds & Blooms was started in 1995. The magazine has its editorial offices in Milwaukee, Wisconsin. The magazine is produced once every two months. Most of the articles and photographs in the magazine are reader-submitted, giving the magazine a non-scientific approach. It contains information on how to attract birds and other wildlife to the backyard and other information of interest to outdoor enthusiasts and amateur ornithologists and lepidopterists.

The magazine targets audiences from two hobby demographics: gardening and birdwatching. In 2008, 70% of American adults were involved in gardening, and 6.4% were bird-watchers.

In May 2005, Birds & Blooms began publishing Birds & Blooms EXTRA with magazine issues published six months a year on alternating months to the original Birds & Bloom magazine.

== See also ==
- Birdwatching
- Gardening
- List of ornithology journals
