= Trusted Media Brands =

Multi-platform media and publishing company

Coordinates: 40.753921°N 73.973068°W

Trusted Media Brands, Inc.
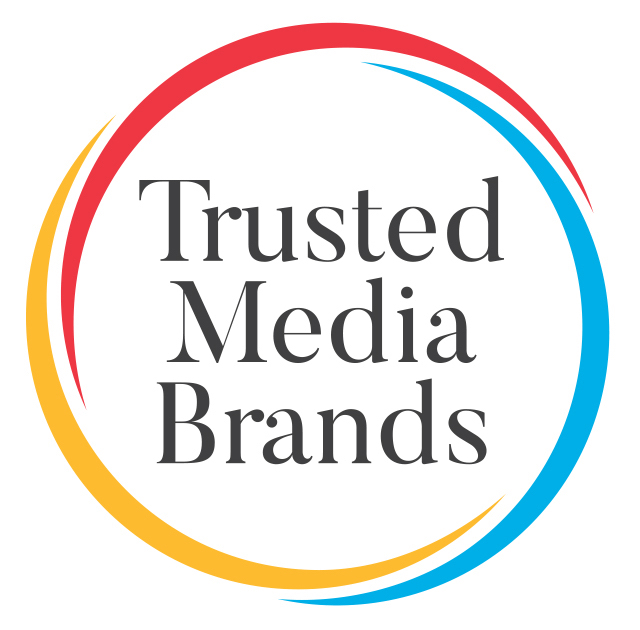
- Founded: 1922; 104 years ago (as Reader's Digest Association, Inc.); New York City
- Founder: DeWitt Wallace; Lila Bell Wallace
- Country of origin: United States
- Headquarters location: New York City; White Plains, New York
- Key people: Stephen Colvin (CEO) Jen Tyrrell (CPO) Beth Tomkiw (CCO)
- Publication types: Digital content; Magazines; Books
- Official website: trustedmediabrands.com

Trusted Media Brands, Inc. (TMBI), formerly known as the Reader's Digest Association, Inc. (RDA), is an American multi-platform media and publishing company that is co-headquartered in New York City and in White Plains, New York. The company was founded by DeWitt Wallace and his wife Lila Bell Wallace in 1922, launched in New York City with the publication of the Reader's Digest magazine.

The company's brands include Reader's Digest, Taste of Home, The Family Handyman, FailArmy, Birds & Blooms, Reminisce, Country, EnrichU, and others. At its peak in 1973, the flagship magazine had over 30 million subscribers and was published in 30 countries. As of 2016, its portfolio of brands garners 53 million unique online visitors and 40 million print readers per month.

== History ==
Trusted Media Brands, Inc. (TMBI) was founded as Reader's Digest Association, Inc. (RDA) in New York City in 1922 by DeWitt Wallace and Lila Bell Wallace, a married couple. They self-published the first edition of Reader's Digest in February 1922. To market the magazine, the two used direct mail marketing and sent 5,000 letters to nurses and school teachers. In 1925, DeWitt Wallace purchased land in Westchester County, New York where he moved the headquarters of RDA. In 1927, Reader's Digest had 30,000 subscribers. In 1939, it reached 3 million, and by 1973, it had 30 million subscribers.

In 1986, under the new leadership of George Grune, RDA began creating and acquiring new brands as well as publications to diversify its portfolio. Its first special-interest magazine, Travel Holiday, was acquired in 1986 and was followed by the acquisition of The Family Handyman in 1987. In 1990, it acquired American Health. In the same year, the company went public. At the time, it had 7,200 employees in 54 locations throughout the world.

In 1991, RDA acquired Joshua Morris Publishing, a children's book publisher and made a move into the children's book industry.

In 2002, RDA purchased Reiman Publications and its 12 magazines for $760 million. The deal gave RDA ownership of magazines including Taste of Home, Country Woman, Birds & Blooms, Country, Reminisce, Healthy Cooking, Simple & Delicious, and Farm & Ranch Living. In 2005, RDA launched Every Day with Rachael Ray and purchased Allrecipes.com in 2006. Both magazines were sold to the Meredith Corporation in 2011 and 2012 respectively.

In March 2007, RDA was purchased by an investment group led by private equity firm, Ripplewood Holdings, for $1.6 billion. RDA was made a private company for the first time since 1990. RDA filed for bankruptcy in 2009 and again in 2012. It emerged from bankruptcy in 2013. On April 7, 2014, Bonnie Kintzer was appointed president and CEO of RDA; she had previously worked at RDA from 1998 to 2007.

One of Kintzer's first major moves was to change the company's name to Trusted Media Brands, Inc. (TMBI) in September 2015. The new name was chosen to encompass all brands under the company's banner rather than just Reader's Digest. TMBI has placed renewed focus on a wide variety of media platforms including digital content, social media, video, and others. As of 2016, TMBI's portfolio of brands reaches 53 million unique visitors, 40 million print readers, and 40 million social media users per month. In 2016, TMBI sold its children's publishing operations to Readerlink Distribution Services.

In August 2021, TMBI acquired the viral video licensing company Jukin Media.

== Brands and publications ==
Trusted Media Brands manages several media brands both online and in-print. Reader's Digest has been in continuous publication since 1922, publishing true stories, advice, interest stories and humor. The magazine was at one time the largest consumer magazine in the United States.

Taste of Home publishes recipes, tips and stories from home cooks, and produces the Fun with Food! and America the Tasty web series. The Family Handyman publishes DIY, home improvement and home repair advice and how-to guides from experts and professionals. Birds & Blooms is the largest birdwatching and gardening magazine in North America, publishing stories on gardening, DIY crafts, environmental management, and information on birds and other backyard animals.

Other magazine brands include EnrichU, LifeRich Publishing, and Haven Home.

== Business divisions ==
North America

- Reader's Digest, RD.com, magazine, books
- Taste of Home, TasteofHome.com, magazine, books
- The Family Handyman, Birds & Blooms, Country, Farm & Ranch Living, Haven Home, Reminisce
- EnrichU, Taste Digital Community
- Jukin Media

International

(Operations and licenses in 30+ countries)

- RD Europe, Africa and Middle East
- RD Asia Pacific
- RD Canada
- RD Latin America regions

== See also ==
- List of New York companies
- List of English-language book publishing companies
