= Hachette =

Hachette may refer to:

- Hachette (surname)
- Louis Hachette Group, a French publishing and media conglomerate resulting from the spin-off of Vivendi in 2024
  - Hachette Livre, a French publisher, the imprint of Louis Hachette Group (through Lagardère Publishing)
    - Hachette Book Group, the American subsidiary
    - Hachette Distribution Services, the distribution arm

== See also ==
- Hachette Filipacchi Médias, a former French magazine publisher, a subsidiary of Lagardère Media
  - Hachette Filipacchi Media U.S., the American subsidiary
- Oxford-Hachette French Dictionary: French–English English–French
