= Louis Hachette Group =

French publishing and media conglomerate

Louis Hachette Group S.A.

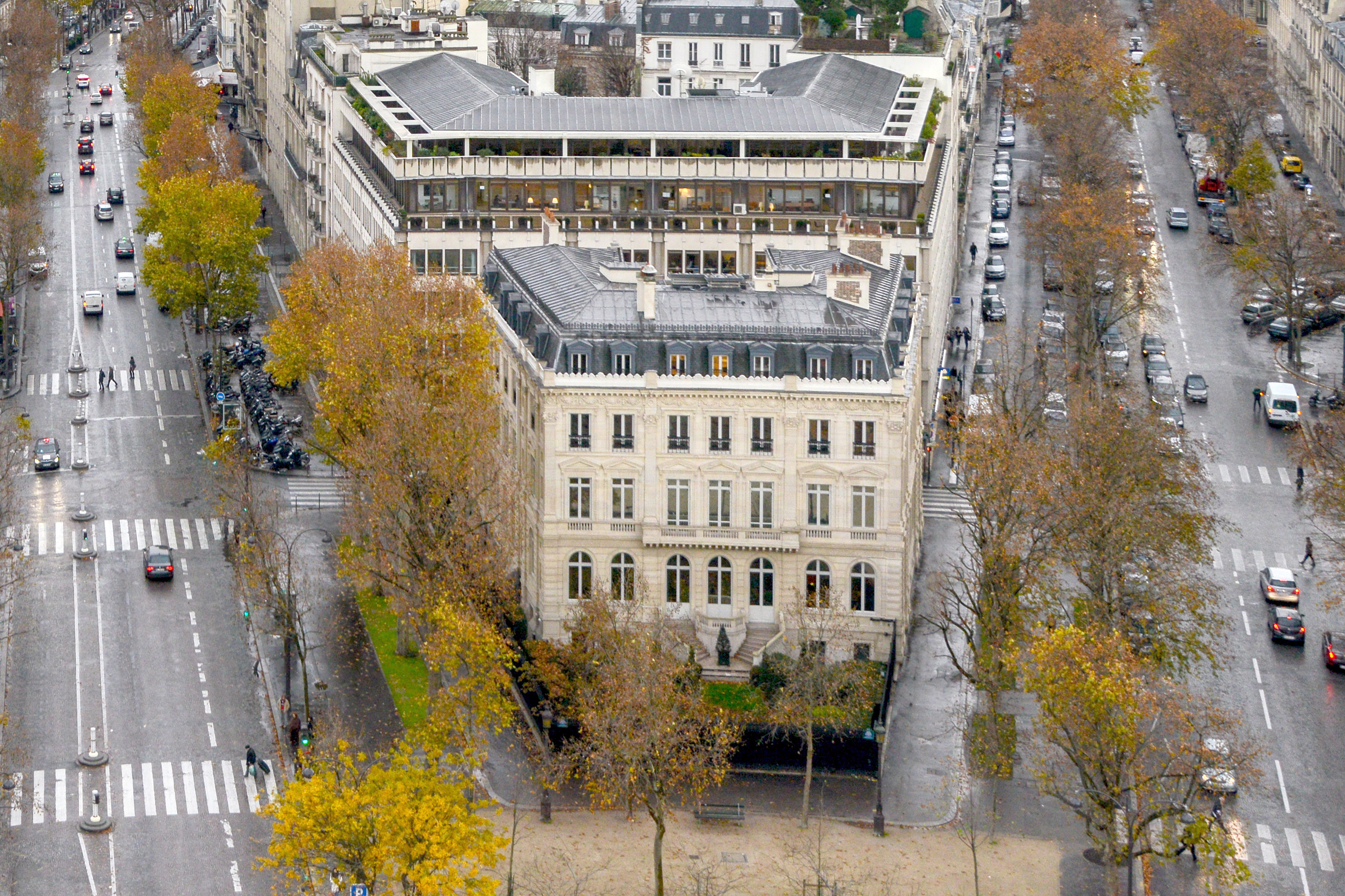
- Headquarters of Louis Hachette Group S.A. at Rue de Presbourg, Paris
- Type: Public
- Traded as: Euronext Paris: ALHG; Euronext Growth
- Industry: Publishing, Media, Travel Retail, Live Entertainment, Sports club
- Predecessors: Vivendi publishing division
- Founded: 1826; 200 years ago (as Hachette); October 29, 2024; 21 months ago (as Louis Hachette Group)
- Founder: Louis Hachette; Arnaud de Puyfontaine; Yannick Bolloré
- Headquarters: Paris, France
- Area served: Worldwide
- Key people: Jean-Christophe Thiery (CEO); Arnaud Lagardère (Vice-Chairman of the Board of Directors); Yannick Bolloré (director); Grégoire Castaing (deputy CEO)
- Revenue: ▲€9.619 billion (2025)
- Owner: Bolloré (31%); Arnaud Lagardère (8.7%); Other shareholders (60.3%)
- Number of employees: 33,957 (2025)
- Subsidiaries: Lagardère (65.73%); Prisma Media
- Website: www.louishachettegroup.com

Louis Hachette Group S.A. (LHG) is a French conglomerate specialising in publishing, travel retail and media, with its origins in the Hachette bookshop founded in 1826. Louis Hachette Group is controlled by French businessman Vincent Bolloré and his family.

Formed from the spin-off of Vivendi in December 2024, the new independent entity holds 65.73% of the Lagardère group (Hachette Livre, Larousse, Fayard, Relay, Le Journal du dimanche, Europe 1, etc.) as well as 86.42% of the French press group Prisma Media (Voici, Femme Actuelle, Geo (France), Télé-Loisirs, Capital, etc.).

France's leading publisher since 2004 and the world's 6th largest publishing group (the world's third-largest consumer publishing group, excluding professional publishing), Louis Hachette Group has its origins in the Hachette publishing group, founded by Louis Hachette in 1826 after the purchase of the Parisian bookshop Brédif.

== History ==
In December 2023, Vivendi announced that it was carrying out a feasibility study into a plan to split its activities into 4 entities: Canal+, Havas, a publishing and distribution company (combining Lagardère and Prisma Media), and an investment company.

On 29 October 2024, the new Louis Hachette Group was created as a publishing and distribution company, leaving Vivendi as an investment company. On 30 October 2024, Vivendi and the new Louis Hachette Group entity entered into a partial demerger agreement, enabling LHG to hold a 66.53% stake in Lagardère and a 100% stake in Prisma Media in the event of a favourable vote by Vivendi shareholders.

The company started trading at Euronext Paris on 16 December 2024, the shares were trading at 1.42 euros on that day, up 18% on the opening price.

In May 2026, major publishers including Hachette sued Meta Platforms, alleging that Meta used their books and journal articles, without their permission, to train Llama.

== Activities ==
The activities of Louis Hachette Group are carried out by two main entities:

- Lagardère SA
  - Lagardère Publishing
    - Hachette Livre (publishing)
      - Hachette Book Group (ex-Time Warner Book Group)
      - Hachette Australia
      - Little, Brown and Company
      - Orion Publishing Group
        - Bounty Books
        - Conran Octopus
        - Cassell Illustrated
        - etc.
      - Armand Colin
      - Grasset
      - Hatier
      - Fayard
      - JC Lattès
      - Calmann-Levy
      - Dunod
      - Chambers Harrap
      - etc.
  - Lagardère Travel Retail (commercial retail in airports)
    - Relay
    - Paradies Lagardère
    - Aelia
    - etc.
  - Lagardère News (media)
    - Le Journal du dimanche and its supplements Le JDNews and Le JDMag
    - and the Elle licence
  - Lagardère Radio
    - Europe 1
    - Europe 2
    - and RFM
  - Lagardère Live Entertainment (entertainment)
    - Casino de Paris, Arkéa Arena and Folies Bergère.
  - Lagardère Paris Racing (sports club)
- Prisma Media
  - Femme actuelle
  - Télé-Loisirs
  - Prima
  - Voici
  - Geo (France)
  - Ça m'Intéresse
  - National Geographic (France)
  - Neon
  - Capital
  - Harvard Business Review France
  - Simone

== Shareholders ==
At 5 May 2026:

| Bolloré SE | 31 % |
| Arnaud Lagardère | 8.7 % |
| Other shareholders | 60.3 % |

== Governance ==
=== Management ===
Jean-Christophe Thiery: Chairman and Chief Executive Officer of Louis Hachette Group

Grégoire Castaing: Deputy Chief Executive Officer of Louis Hachette Group

=== Board of directors ===
Jean-Christophe Thiery: Chairman of the Board of Directors

Arnaud Lagardère: Vice-Chairman of the Board of Directors

Yannick Bolloré: director

Sophie Chassat: independent director

Maud Fontenoy: independent director

Arnaud de Puyfontaine: director

== See also ==
- Lagardère group
- Hachette Livre
- Arnaud Lagardère
