= Standard French =

Standardized variety of French language

Standard French (in French: le français standard, le français normé, le français neutre 'Neutral French' or le français international 'International French') is an unofficial term for a standard variety of the French language. It is a set of spoken and written formal varieties used by the educated francophones of several nations around the world.

As French is a pluricentric language, Standard French encompasses various linguistic norms (consisting of prescribed usage). The syntax, morphology, and orthography of Standard French are explained in various works on grammar and style such as the Bescherelle, a reference summary of verb conjugations first compiled in the 19th century by Louis-Nicolas Bescherelle from France, and Le Bon Usage written in the 20th century by Belgian grammarian Maurice Grevisse.

In France, Standard French is based on the pronunciation and vocabulary used in the formal registers of French in Metropolitan France.

In Quebec, it is more often called "International French" or "Radio Canada French" because of decades of a foreign European pronunciation that dominated both news and cultural broadcasts until the 1970s. In the rest of Francophone Canada, the spoken and written varieties of formal Quebec French as well as language in Government of Canada documents and speeches are viewed as Standard French. Linguists have been debating what actually constitutes the norm for Standard French in Quebec and Canada on a lexical level since research to date has concentrated much more on the differences from informal varieties of Quebec French and Acadian French.

Since French-speaking Canadians usually use reference works written by the French, Belgians and reputed Canadian linguists and lexicographers alike, answers concerning an endogenous norm are not always apparent.

Although Standard French has in fact undergone centuries of human intervention and language planning, popular opinion contends that Standard French should consist solely of the rulings by the Académie française in France or in standardization from terminological work by the Office québécois de la langue française in Quebec. There is further perceived or actual linguistic hegemony in favour of France by virtue of tradition, the former imperialism, and a demographic majority. Such notions hinge on linguistic prestige rather than on a linguistic norm.

Also, despite the existence of many regional varieties of French in the Francophone world, Standard French is normally chosen as a model for learners of French as a foreign or second language. The standard pronunciation of Metropolitan French is, out of concerns for comprehension or social stigma, sometimes favoured over other standard national pronunciations in teaching French to non-native speakers in Francophone nations other than France.

== See also ==
- Canadian French
- French grammar
- French phonology
- Formal written English
- Language policy in France
- Linguistic prescription
- Standard English
- Varieties of French
- Académie royale de langue et de littérature françaises de Belgique (Royal Academy of French Language and Literature of Belgium)
