= Femme Actuelle =

Women's magazine in France

- Categories: Women's magazine
- Frequency: Weekly
- Circulation: 284,633 (2025)
- Founded: 1984
- First issue: 1 October 1984; 41 years ago
- Company: Prisma Media (Louis Hachette Group)
- Country: France
- Based in: Paris
- Language: French
- Website: Femme Actuelle
- ISSN: 0764-0021
- OCLC: 421638622

Femme Actuelle (French: lit. Current Woman) is a weekly women's magazine published in Paris, France.

== History and profile ==
Femme Actuelle was first published in October 1984. The magazine is part of Prisma Media, formerly a subsidiary of the German media company Gruner + Jahr. It is published by Prisma Media on a weekly basis on saturdays. Prisma Media also owns other magazines, including Prima, Voici and Télé-Loisirs.

Femme Actuelle is headquartered in Paris and covers articles on fashion, cosmetics, literature, and entertainment.

Its British edition is called Best and its Spanish edition Mia. Both magazines were also owned by Gruner + Jahr company. Best was later sold to Nat Mags in 2000 and it is still published by Hearst Magazines UK.

On 26 July 2010 Femme Actuelle introduced a separate pocket-sized edition.

Vivendi acquired Prisma Media from Bertelsmann in 2020 and later the company spun-out its publishing operation (including Prisma Media and Femme Actuelle) into Louis Hachette Group in 2024.

== Circulation ==
In 1988 Femme Actuelle sold nearly two million copies. The circulation of the magazine was 1,837,000 copies in 1991. It was the fifth best-selling magazine in France in 1999 with a circulation of 1,634,000 copies. The magazine had a circulation of 1,538,000 copies in 2001, making it the twelfth best-selling women's magazine worldwide.

Femme Actuelle had a circulation of 1,346,850 copies during the period of 2003-2004. The magazine sold 1,292,000 copies in 2005. In 2006 its circulation rose to 1,710,000 copies.

In 2009 Femme Actuelle was the best-selling French women's magazine with a circulation of 927,420. The same year it was also the fourth best-selling weekly women magazine in Europe. In 2014 its circulation was 687,100 copies. In the period of 2017-2018 the paid circulation of the magazine was 580,249 copies.

Femme Actuelle sold 284,633 copies in 2025.
