= Edelsa =

Spanish publisher

Edelsa, also Edelsa Grupo Didascalia S.A., is a Spanish language publisher of textbooks and materials for language teaching and studying especially of Spanish as a foreign language.

== History ==
Edelsa was found in 1986 and from the beginning the published books for students of Spanish language as a foreign language.

In 1988 they bought Edi 6 publishers with their series called: "Español como Lengua Extranjera (E/L.E.)". Since this time Edelsa is more focused for Spanish textbooks, dictionaries, grammares and other related books. In 1995 Edelsa was bought by French Hachette-Livre publishers from Lagardère group. At this time Edelsa is one of the biggest publishers on the field of Spanish teaching materials of Spanish as a foreign language. Other important publishers on the field are SGEL, DIFUSIÓN, EDICIONES SM and SANTILLANA.

In the 2010s, the publishing house began a digitization process, creating multimedia products, virtual platforms, online libraries, and e-books.

== Material ==
=== Books ===
- Para empezar
- Esto funciona
- Ven
- Nuevo Ven
- ECO
- La pandilla
- Los trotamundos
- Chicos/chicas
- Primer plano
- Planet@
- Puesta a punto
- Punto final
- ¿A que no sabes...?
- Submarino
