= Demetrius Fordham =

American portrait photographer and author

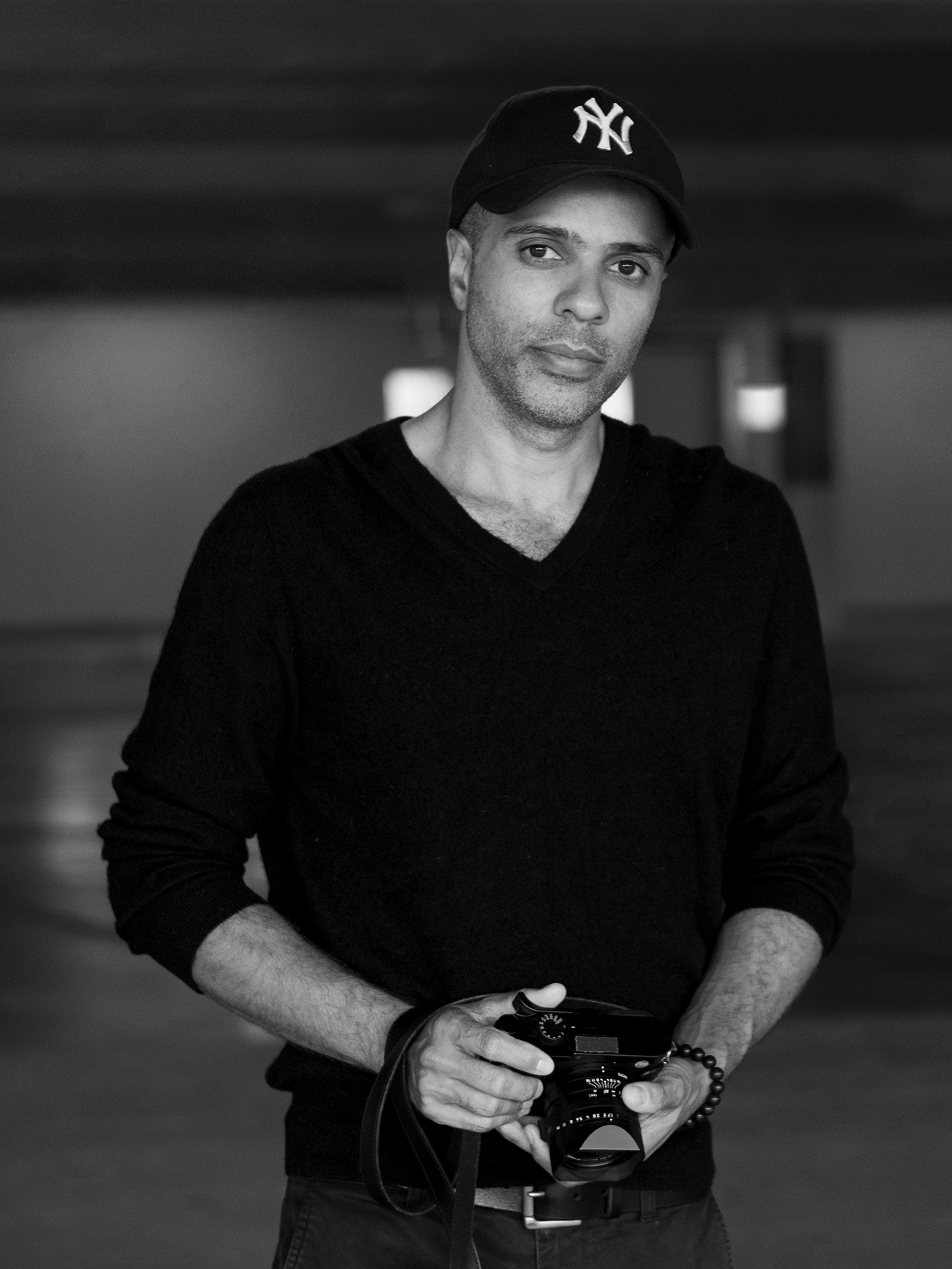
- Demetrius Fordham, portrait photographer and author
- Born: August 22, 1981 (age 45); Stuttgart, Germany
- Education: Brooks Institute; The New School
- Occupation: Photographer
- Movement: Portraiture
- Website: demetriusfordham.com

Demetrius Fordham (born August 22, 1981) is an American portrait photographer and author. He is known for his work exploring the themes, including human identity, discrimination inequality, sustainability and the natural world.

Fordham's photographic work has been published by international magazines and newspapers such as W Magazine, Condé Nast Traveler, Condé Nast Traveler India, Elite Traveler, The Wall Street Journal, Schön Magazine, LensCulture and other publications. He is a member of American Society of Media Photographers (ASMP) and has also contributed to Hachette.

== Life and career ==
Demetrius Fordham was born on August 22, 1981, in Stuttgart, Germany. He was raised between Stuttgart and Denver, Colorado. He began his career in New York City, where he worked on shooting editorial and commercial photography.

== Publications ==
=== Books ===
- Fordham, Demetrius (October 6, 2015). What They Didn't Teach You In Photo School. Ilex Press. p. 224. ISBN 978-1781572696.
- Fordham, Demetrius (September 5, 2017). If You're Bored with Your Camera. Ilex Press. p. 128. ISBN 978-1781574317.
