= Relay (shop) =

Retail chain

- Formerly: Relais H (1852–2000)
- Type: Société en Nom Collectif
- Industry: Retail
- Founded: 1852; 174 years ago in Paris, France
- Founder: Louis Hachette
- Headquarters: Levallois-Perret, Greater Paris, France
- Number of locations: 450 (France Travel); 1,120 (International Travel)
- Area served: Worldwide
- Key people: Frédéric Chevalier (chair)
- Brands: Relay; Hubiz by Relay; Tech2Go
- Number of employees: 24,914 (2025)
- Parent: Louis Hachette Group
- Subsidiaries: Paradies Lagardère Travel Retail
- Website: relay.com

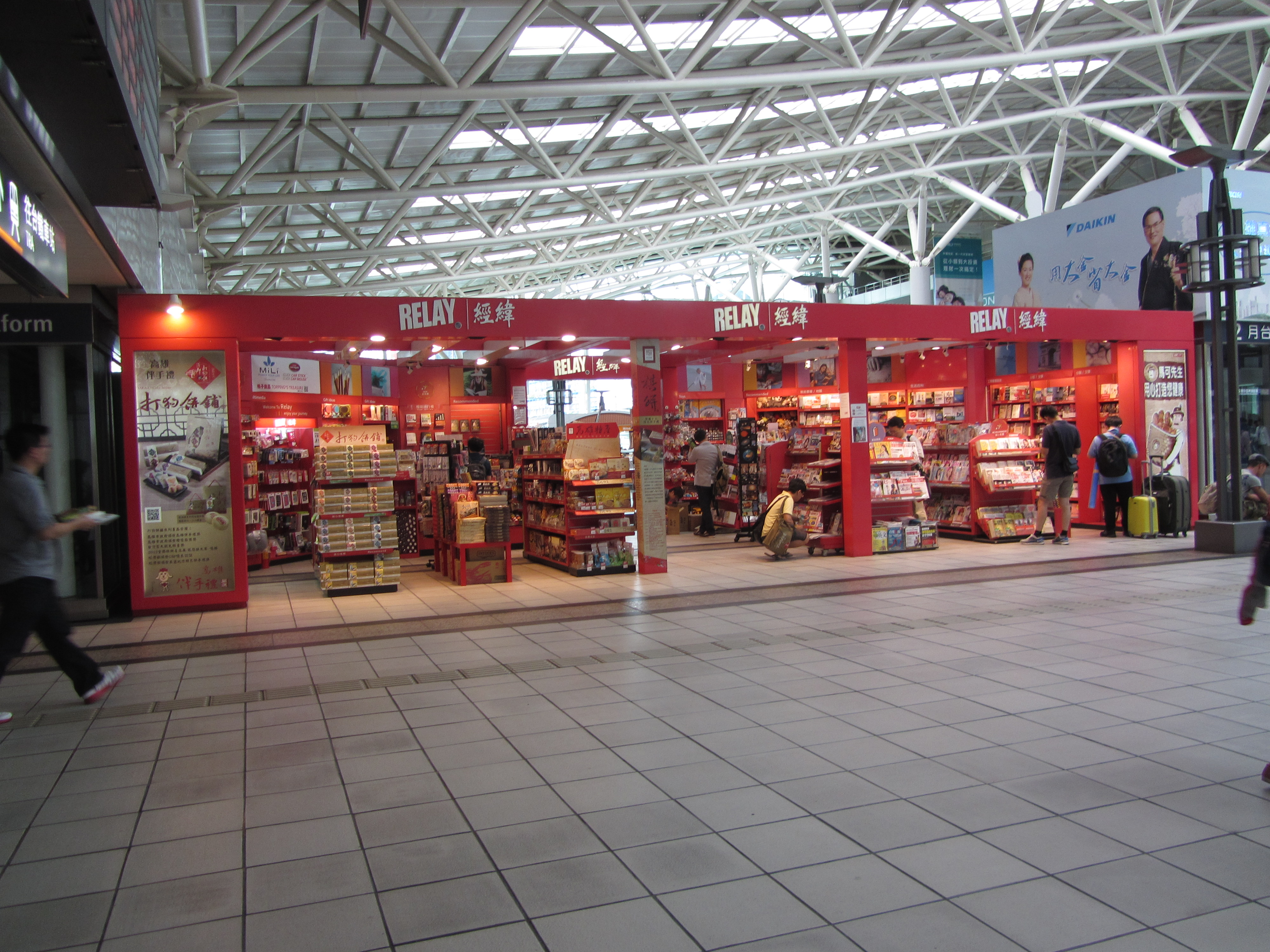
Relay Shop in THSR Zuoying Station, Kaohsiung, Taiwan

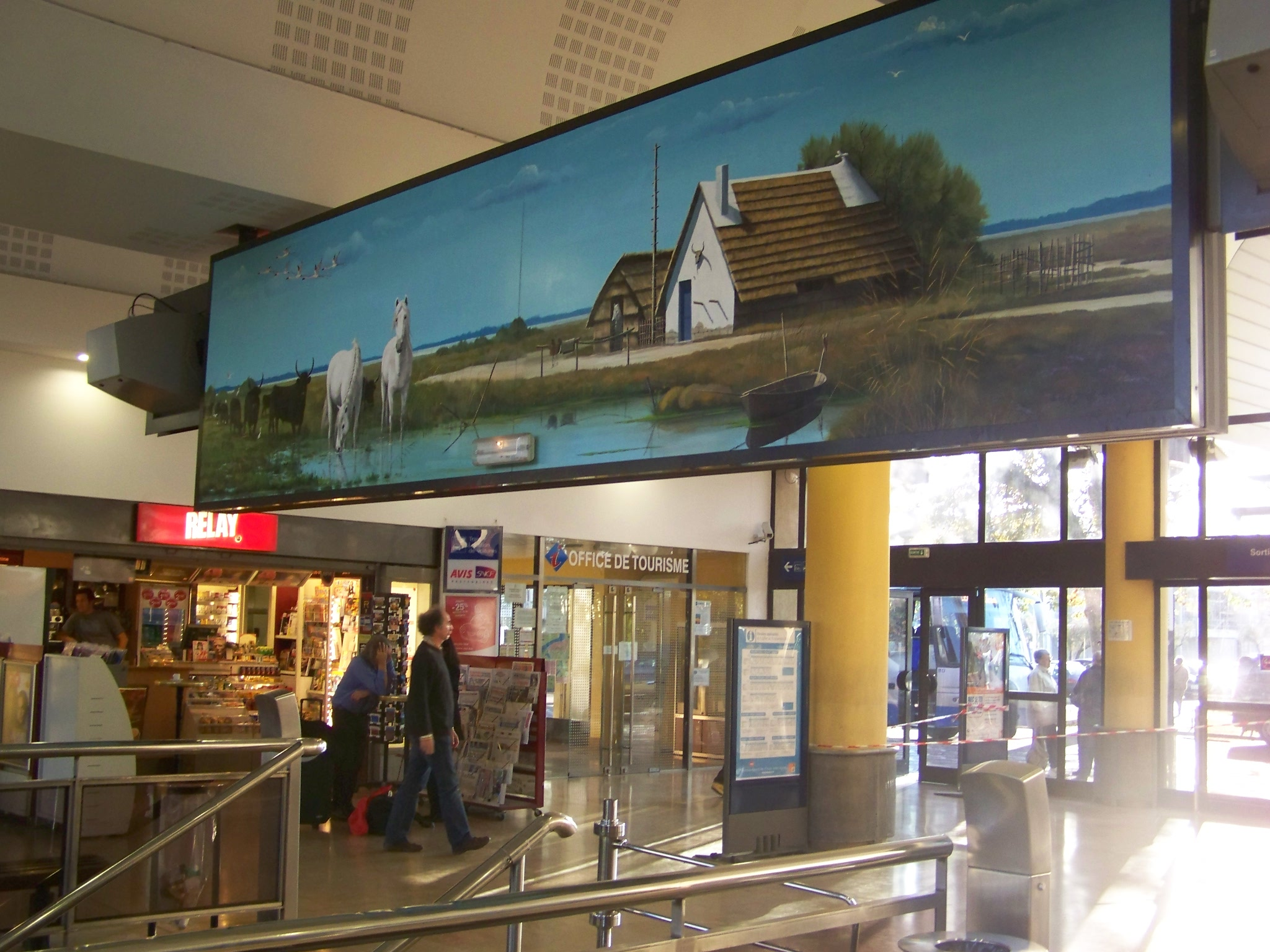
Relay shop in the Gare d'Arles.

Lagardère Travel Retail SNC, trading as Relay, is a French travel retailer and a chain of newspaper, magazine, book, and convenience stores, mostly based in train stations and airports. It is owned by Lagardère Travel Retail, a subsidiary of the French conglomerate Louis Hachette Group, itself owned by French billionaire businessman Vincent Bolloré.

The company was formed by Louis Hachette in 1852. Its heaviest concentration is in France, but it also operates in other countries. In 2010, the network had 1,100 shops on 4 continents. In Northern America, Relay is operated by Paradies Lagardère Travel Retail.

== History ==
Relay started under the name Relais H', when in 1852 Louis Hachette acquired the "trainstations' libraries". The sales of newspapers quickly overperformed the sales of books. To keep books' sales up, Relais H innovated by creating book series and asking specific authors to write those series.

In January 2000, the stores Relais H became Relay. At that time, Relay owned 1,000 stores in 10 countries in Europe and North America.

In October 2012, Lagardère Travel Retail created a joint-venture with Indian Travel Food Services to develop Relay in India.

In February 2016, Lagardère sold its Travel Retail operations in Belgium to the Bpost group for $491 million.

== See also ==
- Relay (disambiguation)
