= List of largest book publishers of the United Kingdom =

This is a list of largest UK trade book publishers, with some of their principal imprints, ranked by sales value.

== List ==
According to Nielsen BookScan as of 2010, the largest book publishers of the United Kingdom were:

1. Penguin Random House £409.9m (23.4%)
  - Penguin: Penguin, Hamish Hamilton, Allen Lane, Michael Joseph, Viking, Rough Guides, Dorling Kindersley, Puffin, Ladybird, Warne
  - Random House: Random House, Century, Hutchinson Heinemann, Arrow; Chatto & Windus, Jonathan Cape, Harvill Secker, Vintage, Pimlico, Bodley Head; Transworld, Doubleday, Bantam Press, Black Swan, Bantam, Corgi; Ebury Press, BBC Books; Virgin Books, Black Lace, Nexus, Cheek; Andersen Press
2. Hachette Livre (UK) £287.9m (16.4%)
  - Headline; Hodder & Stoughton, Sceptre, Quercus; Little, Brown, Abacus, Sphere, Piatkus, Orbit, Virago; Orion, Weidenfeld & Nicolson, Gollancz, Phoenix, Everyman; John Murray; Octopus, Cassell, Hamlyn, Mitchell Beazley, Philips; Orion Children's Books, Hodder Children’s Books, Orchard Books, Franklin Watts, Wayland, Hodder Education, Chambers Harrap
3. HarperCollins £132.3m (7.6%)
  - HarperCollins, 4th Estate, Avon, Voyager, Collins, HarperPress, Blue Door, Harper North
4. Pan Macmillan £57.3m (3.3%)
  - Pan Books, Picador, Macmillan New Writing, Macmillan, Boxtree, Sidgwick and Jackson, Tor (UK), Kingfisher
5. Pearson Education £40.7m (2.3%)
6. Oxford University Press £37.6m (2.1%)
7. Bloomsbury £35.6m (2.0%)
  - Bloomsbury, A&C Black
8. Simon & Schuster £27.2m (1.6%)
9. John Wiley & Sons (UK) £26.7m (1.5%)
- Faber Independent Alliance £57.4m (3.3%)
  - Faber & Faber, Atlantic Books, Canongate, Granta Books, Icon Books, Portobello Books, Profile Books (including Serpent's Tail), Short Books. A number of financially independent smaller publishers that have formed an alliance to share promotion and administration, led by Faber.

== Historical comparisons ==
#	Company	Sales 2010		Sales 2009		Sales 2008		Sales 2007		Sales 2006		Sales 2005	
1	Hachette Livre (UK)	£m	(15.2%)	£287.9m	(16.4%)	£282.5m	(15.9%)	£299.8m	(16.6%)	£277.3m	(16.4%)	£206.1m	(12.5%)
2	Random House (UK)	£m	(13.8%)	£239.4m	(13.7%)	£262.7m	(14.8%)	£263.4m	(14.6%)	£261.0m	(15.4%)	£229.9m	(14.0%)
3	Penguin Books	£195.3m	(11.5%)	£170.5m	(9.7%)	£177.2m	(10.0%)	£177.3m	(9.8%)	£180.6m	(10.7%)	£174.9m	(10.6%)
4	HarperCollins	£120.9m	(7.1%)	£132.3m	(7.6%)	£147.5m	(8.3%)	£142.7m	(7.9%)	£141.6m	(8.4%)	£134.8m	(8.2%)
5	Pan Macmillan	£60.9m	(3.6%)	£57.3m	(3.3%)	£57.9m	(3.3%)	£61.4m	(3.4%)	£53.2m	(3.1%)	£54.8m	(3.3%)
6 ▲	Pearson Education	£40.7m	(2.3%)	£42.2m	(2.4%)	£32.3m	(1.8%)	£34.0m	(2.0%)	£32.6m	(2.0%)		
7 ▲	Bloomsbury	£m	(2.1%)	£35.6m	(2.0%)	£43.3m	(2.4%)	£74.7m	(4.2%)	£31.1m	(1.8%)	£62.3m	(3.8%)
8 ▼	Oxford University Press	£m	(2.0%)	£37.6m	(2.1%)	£34.5m	(1.9%)	£33.1m	(1.8%)	£33.1m	(2.0%)	£30.9m	(1.9%)
9 ▲	Simon & Schuster	£31.1m	(1.8%)	£27.2m	(1.6%)	£24.9m	(1.4%)	£26.9m	(1.5%)	£23.9m	(1.4%)	£24.3m	(1.5%)
10 ▼	John Wiley & Sons	£26.7m	(1.5%)	£27m	(1.5%)								
▼	Egmont	£24.9m	(1.4%)	£27m	(1.5%)	£24.9m	(1.4%)	£22.9m	(1.4%)				
	Elsevier					£23.0m	(1.4%)	£21.4m	(1.3%)				
	Faber Alliance	£m	(3.9%)	£57.4m	(3.3%)	£47.5m	(2.7%)	£39.1m	(2.2%)	£41.4m	(2.4%)		

== See also ==
- Books in the United Kingdom
- Book trade in the United Kingdom
