= Akakliké =

1998 video game

- Developers: France Telecom Multimedia; Hachette Multimedia; Taxi Video Brousse
- Publisher: Hatier
- Platforms: Windows; Classic Mac OS
- Release: 1998
- Genre: Educational

Akakliké is a 1998 French educational video game by France Telecom Multimedia, Hachette Multimedia, Taxi Video Brousse and published by Hatier for Windows and Mac. A sequel was released in 2000.

The game features activities for the player to engage with, and a difficulty progression. The series was one of many that dominated French shelves after the success of Adibou, alongside Lapin Malin, Théodule, Atout Clic, Rayman, Vocabulon, and Tibil.

== Reception ==
Software in Zicht felt it would be more accessible to older children. De Standaard felt it wasn't particularly original. De Morgen felt it was "fantastic" first title for young gamers. Trouw disliked the game's "ugly" title. Le Monde felt the game created a "playful and charming universe ". Le orient De Jour decided that the game developed the player's "attention and their curiosity" through its humour and narrative.
