= If You Want to See Your Wife Again =

Book by John Craig

- Author: John Craig
- Published: 1971
- Publisher: Cassell
- Pages: 223
- Awards: Edgar Book Jacket Award
- ISBN: 978-0-304-29305-6

If You Want to See Your Wife Again (ISBN 978-0-304-29305-6) is a book written by John Craig and originally published in 1971 by Cassell (now an imprint of the Octopus Publishing Group). It went on to win the Edgar's Book Jacket Award in 1972.
