= Prima (magazine) =

Women's magazine in France

- Cover of the January 2025 issue (UK)
- Categories: Women's magazine General interest magazine
- Frequency: Monthly
- Publisher: Prisma Press
- Founder: Axel Ganz
- Founded: 1982
- First issue: 1 October 1982; 43 years ago
- Company: Prisma Press (Louis Hachette Group) (France)
- Country: France
- Based in: Paris
- Language: French
- Website: Prima
- ISSN: 0293-2407
- OCLC: 52717546

Prima is a monthly women's magazine published in Paris, France. The magazine has been in circulation since 1982. It has editions in Spain, Germany, and the United Kingdom.

== History and profile ==
Prima was first published in October 1982. It was founded by Axel Ganz. The magazine is part of Prisma Press, formerly a subsidiary of the German media company Gruner + Jahr. It is published by Prisma Press on a monthly basis. The company also owns other magazines, including Femme Actuelle and VSD.

Prima has its headquarters in Paris and features articles about everyday living and fashion, beauty, decor and cuisine. Gwendoline Michaelis was one of the former editors-in-chief of the magazine which adopted a new motto, "rejoignez la communauté des créatrices" (French: Join the community of creative women) in June 2012.

Vivendi acquired Prisma Media from Bertelsmann in 2020 and later the company spun-out its publishing operation (including Prisma Media and Prima) into Louis Hachette Group in 2024.

Editions of Prima were also launched in Spain and Germany. Its another edition was started in the United Kingdom in September 1986. The British edition was sold in 2000 to Nat Mags and is published monthly.

== Circulation ==
In 1991, Prima had a circulation of 1,211,000 copies. Its British edition is the first monthly magazine in the United Kingdom of which circulation rose to more than one million copies. In 1999, Prima was one of ten best-selling magazines in France with a circulation of 1,030,000 copies.

During the period between 2003 and 2004 Prima sold 692,633 copies in France. Its circulation was 686,000 copies in France in 2005. In 2007, the circulation of Prima was 529,000 copies in France and 290,000 copies in the United Kingdom. The magazine had a circulation of 477,389 copies in France and 289,058 copies in the United Kingdom in 2010. The British edition sold 260,550 copies during the first six months of 2012. Its circulation was 307,012 copies in France in 2014. The circulation of the British edition was 195,556 copies in 2021.
