= Best (women's magazine) =

UK women's magazine

- Editor-in-chief: Siobhan Wykes
- Categories: Women's magazine
- Frequency: Weekly
- Publisher: Hearst Magazines
- Founded: 1987
- Country: United Kingdom
- Based in: London
- Language: English
- Website: Official website

Best is a UK women's magazine printed weekly by Hearst Magazines UK. The magazine is headquartered in London.

== History and profile ==
Best was established in 1987. The magazine was the British edition of French women's magazine Femme Actuelle, The target audience of the magazine is working-class women age between 44 and 60. Nat Mags acquired Best from Gruner + Jahr in 2000.

On 8 August 2016 Siobhan Wykes became the executive editor of the magazine, replacing Jenny Vereker in the post. Jackie Hatton was among the former editors. She was named the editor of Best in January 2010, replacing Jane Ennis in the post. From 2005 to 2009 the editor was Michelle Hather.

Best sold 296,971 copies in the first half of 2009. During the first half of 2010, the magazine had a circulation of 302,309 copies.
