= Zest (magazine) =

Defunct women monthly magazine

- Zest April 2012
- Frequency: Monthly
- Total circulation: 64,956 (June 2013)
- Founded: 1994
- First issue: Autumn 1994
- Final issue: January 2014
- Company: Nat Mags
- Country: United Kingdom
- Website: www.zest.co.uk

Zest was a monthly magazine for women looking for health, beauty and fitness advice published in the United Kingdom by Hearst Magazines UK, formerly Nat Mags. It was published between 1994 and January 2014.

== History ==
Zest started life as banded-on supplement with Cosmopolitan in Autumn 1994 and launched as a monthly magazine in April 1996. Previous editors included Vanessa Raphaely and Eve Cameron; the final editor was Mandie Gower. Zest was guest edited by celebrity figure Elizabeth Hurley in June 2010. Hurley then went on to appear on the cover of Zest magazine in January 2012.

Zest had the highest circulation within its competitor set. It was also included twice a year by the National Readership Survey and had a readership of 160,000.

Zest also published a digital edition via the Apple Newsstand and issues were downloadable via a Zest app. The magazine has also produced a book called Running Made Easy.

The magazine ceased publication with the January 2014 issue.
