= Jade Foret =

Belgian model

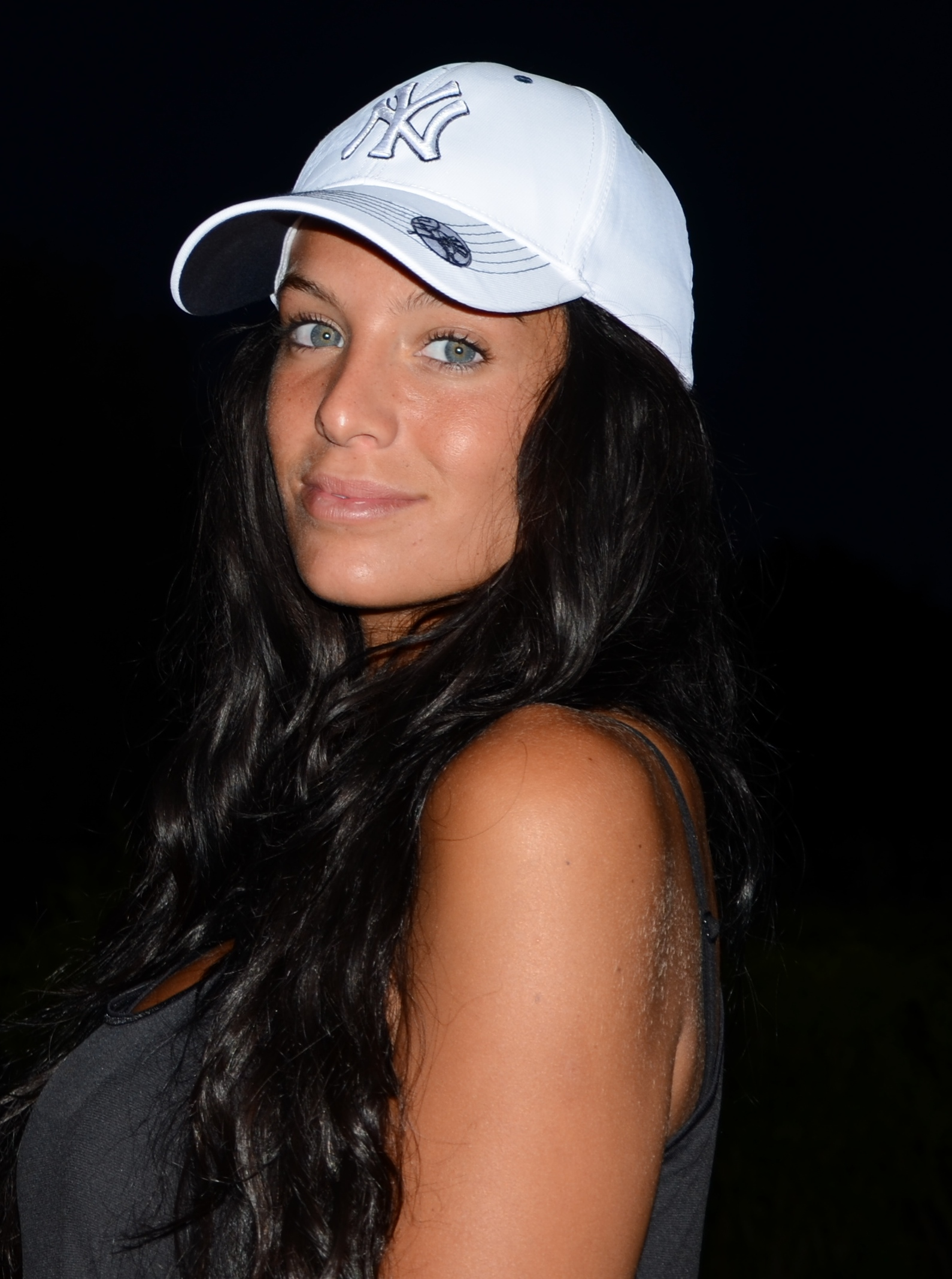
- Jade Foret on holidays in the US - July 2011
- Born: 26 September 1990 (age 36); Woluwe-Saint-Lambert, Belgium
- Spouse: Arnaud Lagardère (m. 2013)
- Children: 3
- Modeling information
- Height: 1.80 m (5 ft 11 in)
- Hair color: Brown
- Eye color: Blue
- Agency: Iconic Management

Jade Foret (born 26 September 1990) is a Belgian model whose family roots are in France. She is married to French businessman Arnaud Lagardère. She announce they are now separated in 2026.

== Biography ==
She is the daughter of Maïté Foret, the fourth child of a family of five. She started modelling at the young age of 12 with the Newmodels agency in 2003. At age 13, in 2004, she became famous in Belgium for a backless picture which was displayed as a gigantic poster for the Levis paint brand (100 m by 20) on the Madou Plaza Tower in Brussels. At the same age, she went on the catwalk for Armani in Italy.

In 2009, she had a short and stormy liaison with soccer player Émile Mpenza, which concluded bitterly. She continued working as a top model and decided to move to New York. She joined the agency One Management. She also tried singing and played bit parts in films and on television.

In 2010, she met businessman Arnaud Lagardère and became his partner. They both appeared in a short making-of of a photo shoot in Lagardère's country residence in Rambouillet in July 2011 for the Belgian daily Le Soir. This video became an instant Internet phenomenon. It also led some employees from the industrial conglomerate of Arnaud Lagardère to challenge his ability to manage the group.

In May 2012, Arnaud Lagardère confirmed that the couple will marry soon and was expecting a baby in September 2012. The baby girl, Liva, was born on 16 September 2012. They married in Paris on 24 May 2013.

They have also a second daughter, Mila (born 9 March 2014) and a son, Nolan (born 16 January 2016).

In 07/2026, she announce her separation with Arnaud Lagardère, althrough they do not divorce.

== Filmography ==
- Louis la Brocante - "Louis et la belle brocante" (2008) : girl at the bar
- Traceless (Sans laisser de traces) (2010) : Russian girl

== Books ==
=== Graphic novels ===
==== Amber Blake series ====
In French

1. La Fille de Merton Castle (2017) with Jackson Guice - Glénat Editions - ISBN 978-2344016190
2. Opération Cleverland (2018) with Jackson Guice - Glénat Editions - ISBN 978-2344024430
3. Opération Dragonfly (2022) with Jackson Guice - Glénat Editions - ISBN 978-2344052068

In English

- Amber Blake (compilation of La Fille de Merton Castle and Opération Cleverland) (2019) - IDW Publishing - ISBN 978-1684055371
