= VSD (French magazine) =

French news, celebrity and leisure magazine

- Editor: Bruno Seznec
- Categories: News, celebrity and leisure magazine
- Frequency: Weekly
- Publisher: Philippe Labi
- First issue: 9 September 1977
- Company: Prisma Press (Louis Hachette Group)
- Country: France
- Based in: Paris
- Language: French
- Website: www.vsd.fr
- ISSN: 1278-916X

VSD is a French weekly news, celebrity and leisure magazine, published on Thursdays in France. The name is formed from the first letters of the French names for Friday (Vendredi), Saturday (Samedi) and Sunday (Dimanche).

== History ==
VSD was first published on 9 September 1977 by Maurice Siegel. After Siegel's death in 1985, direction passed to his sons François and Jean-Dominique. Publication ceased in August 1995. The title was purchased by Prisma Presse, formerly a media subsidiary of the German company Bertelsmann and relaunched in June 1996. Like its rival Paris Match it relies heavily on paparazzi photography and celebrity news. VSD is published on a weekly basis.

== Circulation ==
The circulation of VSD in the 1980s reached 400,000 copies. The 1998 circulation of the weekly was 235,000 copies.

In 2001 VSD had a circulation of 216,000 copies. The magazine had a circulation of 204,036 copies in 2005 and 197,482 copies in 2006. Its circulation grew to 217,751 copies in 2007, but fell to 193,208 copies in 2008. It further fell to 152,221 copies in 2009.

== Acquisition ==
Vivendi acquired Prisma Media from Bertelsmann in 2020 and later the company spun-out its publishing operation (including Prisma Media and VSD) into Louis Hachette Group in 2024.
