= Capital (French magazine) =

French business magazine

- Categories: Business magazine
- Frequency: Monthly
- Circulation: 233,249 (2014)
- Publisher: Prisma Press
- Founder: Alex Ganz
- Founded: 1991; 35 years ago
- First issue: October 1991
- Company: Louis Hachette Group
- Country: France
- Based in: Paris
- Language: French
- Website: Capital
- ISSN: 1162-6704
- OCLC: 29209490

Capital is a monthly French economics and business magazine published in Paris, France.

== History and profile ==
Capital was established in 1991. The magazine took its name from its then-sister publication in Germany with the first issue appeared in October 1991. Axel Ganz, head of the international operations section of Gruner + Jahr, was the founder of the magazine, which is published monthly by the Prisma Press group. The editor-in-chief is Jean-Joël Gurviez. Its target audience is the senior executives and decision-makers in the fields of industry, finance and politics.

In 2015 Capital was redesigned and its logo was changed.

Vivendi acquired Prisma Media from Bertelsmann in 2020 and later the company spun-out its publishing operation (including Prisma Media and Capital France) into Louis Hachette Group in 2024.

== Circulation ==
In 1991 Capital's circulation was 220,000 copies. Its circulation was 339,771 copies in 1994. In 2001 the magazine had a circulation of 384,000 copies. During the period of 2003–2004 the magazine sold 361,450 copies. The magazine's paid circulation in 2007 was 384,795 copies. It was 338,062 copies in the period of 2009–2010. In 2014 the magazine sold 233,249 copies.
