= Arnaud Lagardère =

French businessman

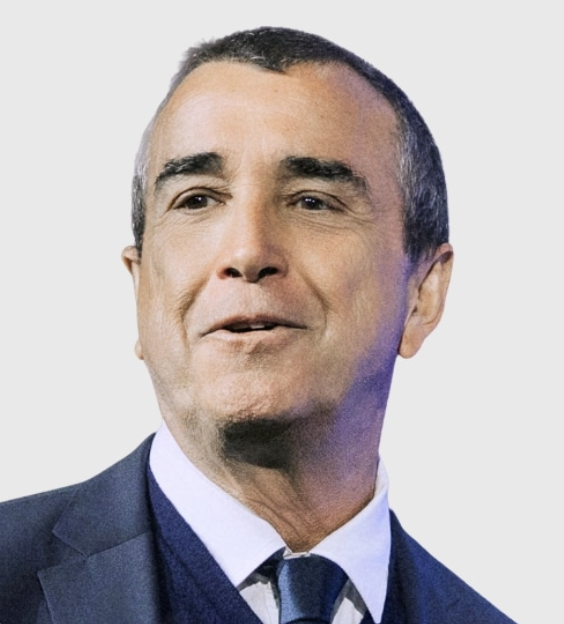
- Born: 18 March 1961 (age 65); Boulogne-Billancourt, France
- Citizenship: French
- Education: Paris-Dauphine University
- Occupations: Chairman and Chief Executive of Lagardère SA Chairman and Chief Executive of Hachette Livre Vice-President of the Board of Directors of Louis Hachette Group
- Spouse(s): Manuela Erdōdy (m. 1985; div. 2010) Jade Foret (m. 2013)
- Parents: Jean-Luc Lagardère (father); Corinne Levasseur (mother)

Arnaud Lagardère (French pronunciation: [aʁno laɡaʁdɛʁ]; born 18 March 1961) is a French businessman, chairman and chief executive officer (CEO) of Lagardère SA, holding company of the Lagardère group, and chairman and CEO of Hachette Livre. He is the son of Jean-Luc Lagardère, the former chairman of Matra and Hachette.

== Career ==
With a DEA higher degree (master) in economics from Paris Dauphine University, Arnaud Lagardère joined the Lagardère Group in 1986.

He was appointed director (1986) and then CEO (1989) of MMB, which became Lagardère SCA in 1996. Since that time, he has held different positions within the group, including chairman of Grolier Inc. in the United States (1994–1998), chairman of Europe 1 - Communication (1999–2007), etc.; since 2003, he has headed the Lagardère Group as General Partner.

In 2001, he took over control of day-to-day businesses of his father Jean-Luc Lagardère.

Since his arrival at the head of the group in 2003, Arnaud Lagardère has gradually refocused Lagardère Group to make it a pure media group which is among the world leaders in the sector. In book publishing, the group acquired 40% of Editis, Houghton Mifflin, and Warner Books. Lagardère Publishing become one of the top publishers in its sector worldwide. In 2006, it created a new entity – Lagardère Sports – which became Lagardère Unlimited in May 2010, specializing in sport industry and entertainment, with the successive acquisitions of Sportfive, IEC in Sports, World Sport Group and Best. In September 2015, Lagardère Unlimited has been renamed Lagardère Sports and Entertainment.

Lagardère has been a director of France Télécom (2003–2008), LVMH (2003–2009), and FIMALAC (2003–2006), and a member of the supervisory board of Le Monde (2005–2008).

According to Variety, in 2024, he has stepped down from his executive roles as he battles accusations of embezzlement in France.

== Positions ==
=== Positions in the group ===
Arnaud Lagardère holds the following positions: Chairman and Chief Executive Officer of Lagardère SA, Chairman and Chief Executive Officer of Hachette Livre, General and Managing Partner of Lagardère Radio SCA, Vice-Chairman of the Board of Directors of Louis Hachette Group and President of the Jean-Luc Lagardère Foundation. He is also Non-Executive Chairman of Lagardère Travel Retail since March 1, 2026.

=== Other positions outside the group ===
Outside the group, Lagardère was director and chairman of SOGEADE-GÉRANCE (a French holding company for aeronautics, defense, and space) from 2007 to 2013, member of the board of directors of EADS N.V. from 2003 to 2013, became chairman of EADS' board of directors from 2012, and member of the Conseil stratégique des technologies de l'information (Strategic Information Technology Council) from 2004 to 2007.

== Personal life ==
Lagardère was married to Manuela Erdödy from 1985 to 2010. Then he married the Belgian model Jade Foret in Paris on 24 May 2013. Jade announced on Instagram that they broke up in 07/2026.
