= The Hamlyn Book of Horror and S.F. Movie Lists =

1983 book written by Roy Pickard

- Author: Roy Pickard
- Genre: Film trivia
- Publication date: 1983
- ISBN: 978-0600207788

The Hamlyn Book of Horror and S.F. Movie Lists is a book written by Roy Pickard and published by Hamlyn in 1983. It is a book of trivia about horror and science fiction films.

== Reception ==
Dave Langford reviewed The Hamlyn Book of Horror and S.F. Movie Lists for White Dwarf #50, and stated that "Good if you want to know about scenes cut from famous films, or 40 movie versions of Dracula, or King Kong's inside leg measurement: not exhaustive, but wide-ranging stuff."

Colin Greenland reviewed The Hamlyn Book of Horror and S.F. Movie Lists for Imagine magazine, and stated that "Amaze family and friends. Become absolutely insufferable."

== Reviews ==
- Michael Klossner (1985) in Fantasy Review, January 1985
