= Hamlyn (publisher) =

British publishing company

- Parent company: Octopus Books
- Founded: 1950; 76 years ago
- Founder: Paul Hamlyn
- Country of origin: United Kingdom
- Headquarters location: London
- Publication types: Books
- Imprints: Sun Books (1968–71); Godsfield Press (2003–present); Gaia Books (2004–present)
- Official website: hamlyn.co.uk

Hamlyn is a UK publishing company founded by Paul Hamlyn in 1950 with an initial investment of £350. His desire was to create "fine books with the common touch" which remains the foundation of its commercial success. It is part of the Octopus Publishing Group, now owned by Hachette Livre.

== History ==
Paul Hamlyn sold the company to the International Publishing Company (now TI Media) in 1964, but stayed on until 1969.

In 1964 Hamlyn commenced in Australia under the management of Kevin Weldon. It owned an interest in the Australian independent paperback publisher Sun Books from 1968 until 1971 when Macmillan Australia acquired that company.

In 1975 the Hamlyn Group acquired "a 51 per cent control of Hanna Barbera Australia, an animation production house" and in 1978, James Hardie purchased the Hamlyn Group, that included Hanna Barbera Australia, as well as Rigby Publishers.

Paul Hamlyn bought the company back in 1986 and added it to the holdings of his new company, Octopus Books. Octopus was sold in 1987 to Reed International. Hamlyn's children's division was sold to the Egmont Group in 1998. Hachette Livre bought Octopus in 2001.

Hamlyn is an international publisher of non-fiction illustrated books. Two thirds of the business is in international, North American and export markets. Since 2003 the publisher has made two significant acquisitions:

Godsfield Press was acquired by Hamlyn in October 2003. It is a niche international publisher of illustrated books for the spirituality and alternative health market.

Gaia Books was acquired in March 2004. It is a producer of international co-editions in the field of alternative philosophies and lifestyle.

Octopus Books was sold to Lagardère Group and managed under Lagardère Publishing.

== Notable books ==
- Everyday Cook Book in Colour (1968)
- Hamlyn Junior Encyclopaedia of Nature (1974)
- The Hamlyn Book of Wild Flowers (1981)
- Hamlyn Book of Legendary Creatures by Tom McGowen (1982)
- The Hamlyn Book of Horror and S.F. Movie Lists (1983)
- The Hamlyn Book of Plant Names (1985)
- By Daniel Farson:
  - The Hamlyn Book of Ghosts in Fact and Fiction (1978)
  - The Hamlyn Book of Horror (1979)
  - The Hamlyn Book of Monsters (1984)

== Book series ==
- Adventures from History
- Art and Mankind
- Art of the Western World
- Beaver Books
- Cameo Series
- The Colour Library of Art
- The Colour Library of Art Paperbacks
- Concise Guide in Colour series
- Great Buildings of the World
- Hamlyn All-Colour Paperbacks
- Hamlyn Classics
- Landmarks of the World's Art
- Learning With Colour
- Merlin Books
- Museums of the World
- Odyssey Library
- Pearson's Illustrated Car Servicing Series for Owner Drivers
- Pocket Merlin series
- Portraits of Greatness Series
- The RIBA Drawings Series
- Round The Year Storybooks
- Storytime Gift Books
