= Nat Mags =

British publisher

National Magazine Company (or Nat Mags) is a British magazine publisher based in London. It was established in 1910 by William Randolph Hearst and was a wholly owned subsidiary of the Hearst Corporation.

Arnaud de Puyfontaine became chief executive of Nat Mags in 2009. His predecessor Duncan Edwards had been at the company since around 1990 and was previously managing director. In 2008 The Guardian newspaper named Duncan Edwards the 75th most important person in the British media.

In 2006 Nat Mags expanded into digital media by purchasing women's portal website Handbag.com. Nat Mags soon launched its digital arm Hearst Digital to act as an umbrella for Handbag and its other web acquisition, Net Doctor.

Nat Mags merged with Hachette Filipacchi Médias UK in 2011 to form Hearst Magazines UK.

== Publications ==
Nat Mags publishes the below magazines in the United Kingdom:

- Best
- Cosmopolitan
- Country Living
- Delish
- Digital Spy
- Elle (licensed)
- Elle Decoration (licensed)
- Esquire
- Good Housekeeping
- Harper's Bazaar
- House Beautiful
- Inside Soap
- Men’s Health
- Net Doctor
- Prima
- Red
- Runner's World
- Women's Health

=== Previous publications ===
Nat Mags previously published the below magazines in the United Kingdom:

- All About Soap
- Antique Collector (sold)
- Coast (sold)
- Company
- Connoisseur
- Cosmopolitan Bride
- Nash's
- Prima Baby (sold)
- QP
- Pall Mall
- Real People
- Reveal
- SHE
- SHE's Having a Baby
- Town & Country
- Triathlete's World
- Vanity Fair (sold)
- Womancraft (sold)
- You & Your Wedding (sold)
- Zest magazine
