= Jean-François Dubos =

French businessman

- Born: 2 September 1945 (age 80); Cabourg, France
- Occupation: Business executive

Jean-François Dubos (born 2 September 1945) is a French business executive who served as chairman of the management board (chief executive) of the media conglomerate Vivendi from June 2012 to June 2014.

== Career ==
According to Reuters, Dubos joined Vivendi's predecessor company, Compagnie Générale des Eaux, in 1991 and became the group's general counsel in 1994.

In June 2012, he was appointed chairman of Vivendi's management board after the resignation of his predecessor, Jean-Bernard Lévy.

Dubos said in late 2012 that Vivendi's strategy review was focused on shifting the group toward content and media businesses.

He stepped down as chief executive in 2014 and was succeeded by Arnaud de Puyfontaine.

Business positions
Preceded by Jean-Bernard Lévy	Chairman of the Management Board of Vivendi; 2012–2014	Succeeded by Arnaud de Puyfontaine
