= Louis-Nicolas Bescherelle =

French academic (1802–1883)

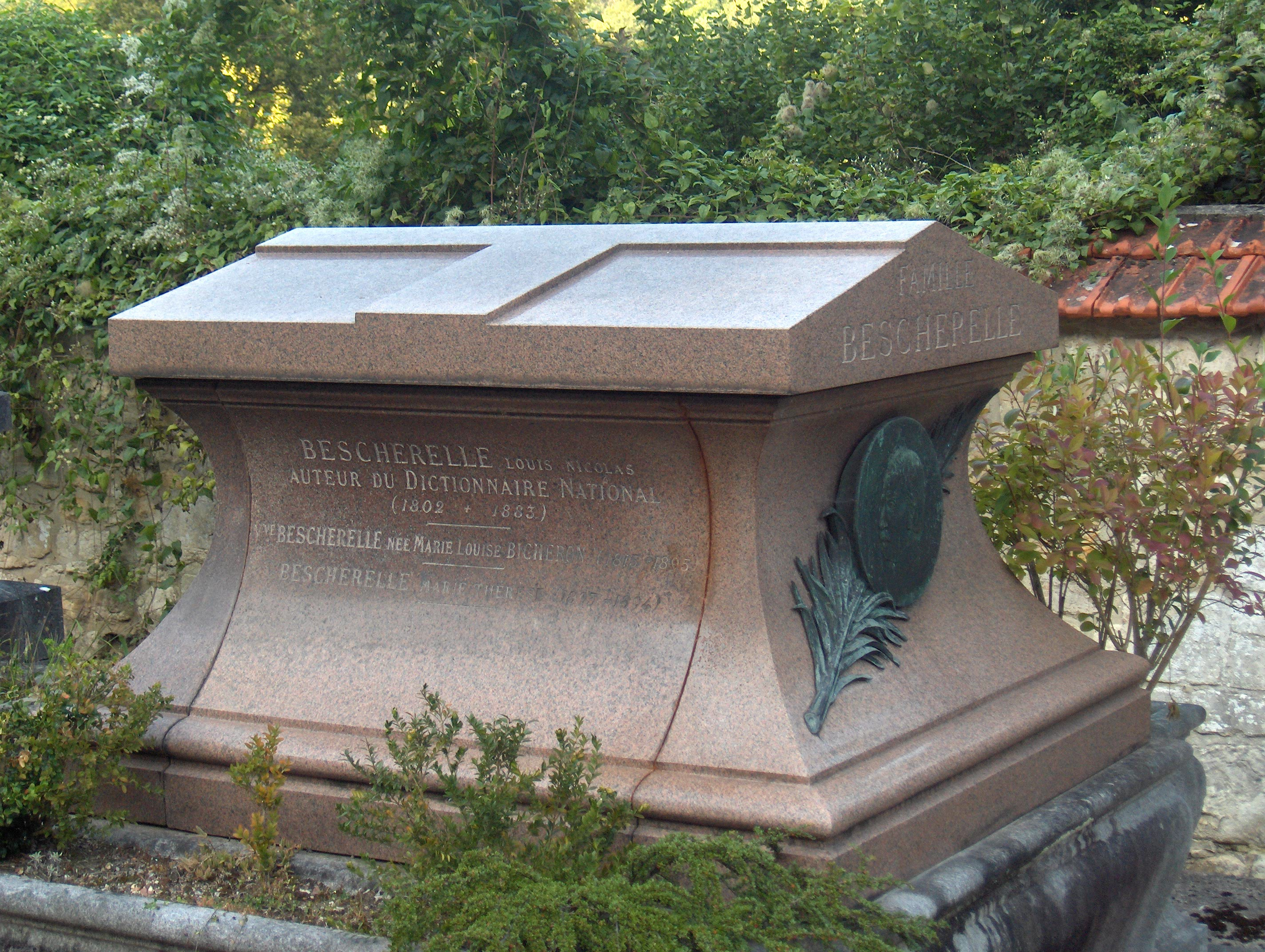
Bescherelle's grave at Valmondois.

Louis-Nicolas Bescherelle (French: [bɛʃ(ə)ʀɛl]; 10 June 1802 in Paris – 4 February 1883 in Paris) was a French lexicographer and grammarian.

With help from his brother Henri (1804 – 1887), he wrote Le Véritable Manuel des conjugaisons ou la science des conjugaisons mise à la portée de tout le monde (Paris: Dépôt central des publications classiques, 1842), a reference guide to French verb conjugation, in 1842.

Louis-Nicolas, this time working alone, followed up six years later with L'Art de conjuguer, ou Simples modèles de conjugaisons pour tous les verbes de la langue française (Paris: Librairie ecclésiastique et classique de Édouard Tetu et Cie, 1848). This covered much the same ground as Le Véritable Manuel, but with a simpler and clearer presentation: 215 model conjugations set out in table form, followed by an alphabetical list of around 6,500 verbs keyed to the models.

While the Le Véritable Manuel enjoyed considerable success, it was L'Art de conjuguer that became the staple for students of French. It went through scores of editions under this title until the 1990s, when it was renamed Bescherelle: La conjugaison pour tous in France (it continued to be published as L'Art de conjuguer in other Francophone territories, notably Quebec). The most recent edition was published by Éditions Hatier in 2025.

The book became so important that his last name is used as a noun to refer to any French conjugation book ("a Bescherelle").

Louis-Nicolas Bescherelle was the publisher of the National Dictionary (Dictionnaire national) or the Universal Dictionary of the French Language (Dictionnaire universel de la langue française), a major dictionary of the 19th century and L'Instruction popularisée par l'illustration (Popularized Instruction for Illustration, now as Popular Instruction for Illustration) in 1851.

He also wrote on an illustrated book on naval history of France, England and Holland (commonly today as the Netherlands) which was published in 1868.

== Works ==
- Universal Dictionary of the French Language (Dictionnaire universel de la langue française)
- L'instruction popularisé de l'illustration (1851)
- Histoire des marins illustres de la France, de l'Angleterre et de la Hollande [Illustrated Naval History of France, England and Holland, now titled as Illustrated Naval History of France, England and the Netherlands] (1868), Ardant

== Bibliography ==
- Bescherelle, Louis-Nicolas. Le véritable manuel des conjugaisons ou la science des conjugaisons mise à la portée de tout le monde, second edition, (1843) OCLC 22297015
