= Editorial Salvat =

Spanish–Catalan publishing house

- Salvat y Cía. S. en C. (1907 logo)
- Type: S.A
- Industry: Collectibles, distribution, licensing and publishing
- Founded: Barcelona, Spain (1898)
- Founder: Espasa i Salvat
- Headquarters: Barcelona, Spain
- Area served: Worldwide
- Products: Books, comic books, magazines
- Parent: Hachette
- Subsidiaries: Salvat Brasil
- Website: Editorial Salvat

Editorial Salvat (Salvat Publishing) is a Spanish–Catalan publishing company created in 1898 in Barcelona. In the 20th century it was widely known for its encyclopedias. At present it belongs to the French group Hachette-Matra.

== Early history ==
The company Espasa Hermanos y Salvat, a forerunner of the publishing houses Espasa i Salvat, was created in 1869 by Manuel Salvat i Xivixell (1842–1901) and the brothers Pau (1835–1927) and Josep Espasa i Anguera (1840–1911). Manuel Salvat married Magdalena Espasa, his partners' sister, in 1872, and the new couple moved to the same house where the printing press was located on Carrer Robador. Pau Espasa retired from the company in 1877. In 1881 Josep Espasa reached an agreement with his brother-in-law Manuel Salvat to form Espasa y Compañía. In 1897 Salvat left the company and in 1898 he created Salvat e Hijo, in which his son, the architect Pau Salvat i Espasa, took part. When he died, Manuel Salvat was succeeded as director by his son Pau, who gave a major boost to the company. In his role as an architect, Pau Salvat was the designer in 1916 of the modernist building of his publishing house, located at Carrer de Mallorca, 39. In its origins, the Salvat publishing house published works such as Hojas selectas, in the writers from Spain and America collaborated for about twenty years. Between 1906 and 1914 the 9 volumes of the Diccionario Salvat Enciclopédico Popular Ilustrado were published, and the 12 volumes of the Diccionario enciclopédico Salvat, as well as the Diccionari de la Llengua Catalana (1910) and the Historia del Arte (1914). The company set up a distributor together with Gustau Gili in Buenos Aires, where it opened its first American branch.

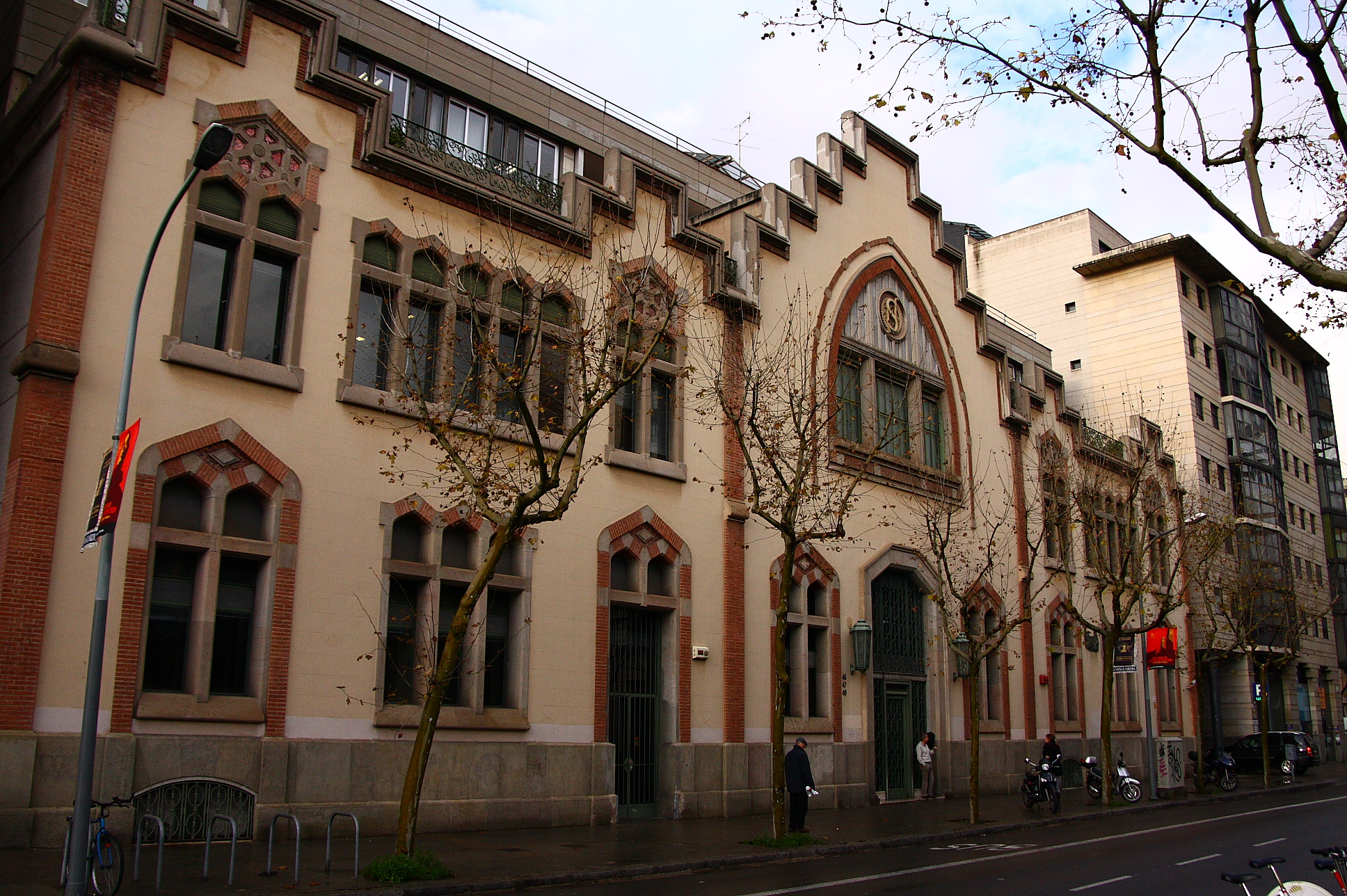
Salvat Headquarters in Barcelona

Pau Salvat died prematurely in 1923 and was succeeded by his brothers Ferran and Santiago Salvat i Espasa (Barcelona, 1891–1971). That year, the company changed its name to Salvat Editores, S.A. Ferran and Santiago modernized the company in the 1920s and 1930s, and made it one of the industry leaders in the state, incorporating advances in machinery and distribution. During this time he published Surgery, Theoretical-Practical Treatise on Surgical Pathology and Clinic (1925), the History of the World (1926) by Josep Pijoan, the Wery Agricultural Encyclopedia (1928) and the Saved Geographical Atlas (1928). In 1932 he separated the printing business from publishing, creating the company Imprenta Hispano-Americana S.A.

== Civil War ==
The Spanish Civil War and the postwar period brought censorship and economic hardship, and the company did not recover until the mid-1950s, when it intensified its presence in Latin America, with subsidiaries in Argentina, Mexico, Venezuela, Brazil and Colombia, and edited the encyclopedia El mundo de los niños (1958), and published in Catalan the Costumari Català (1950–1956), by Joan Amades, in five volumes, republished in 1982.

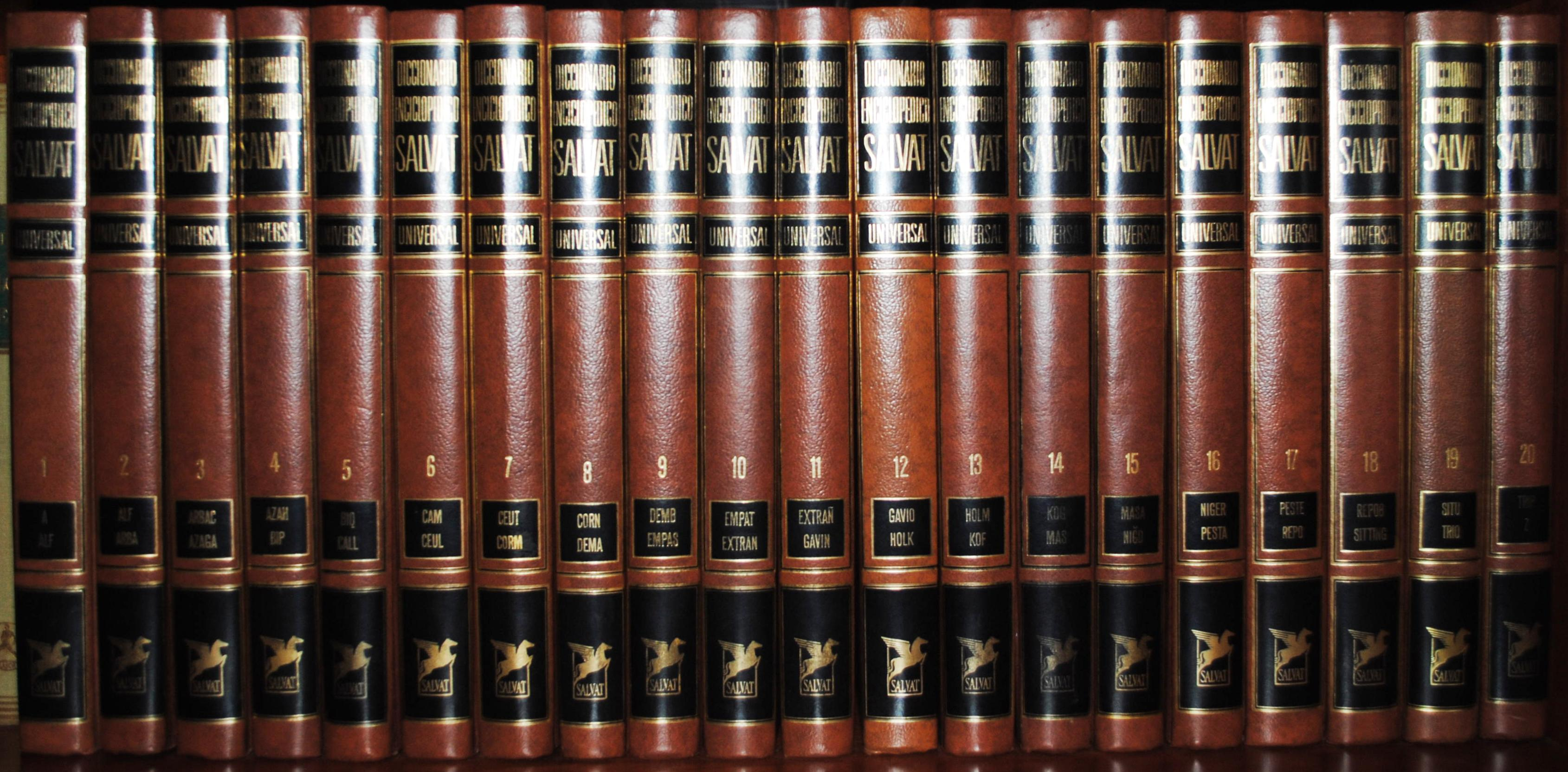
Diccionario Enciclopédico Salvat Universal (Salvat Universal Encyclopedic Dictionary)

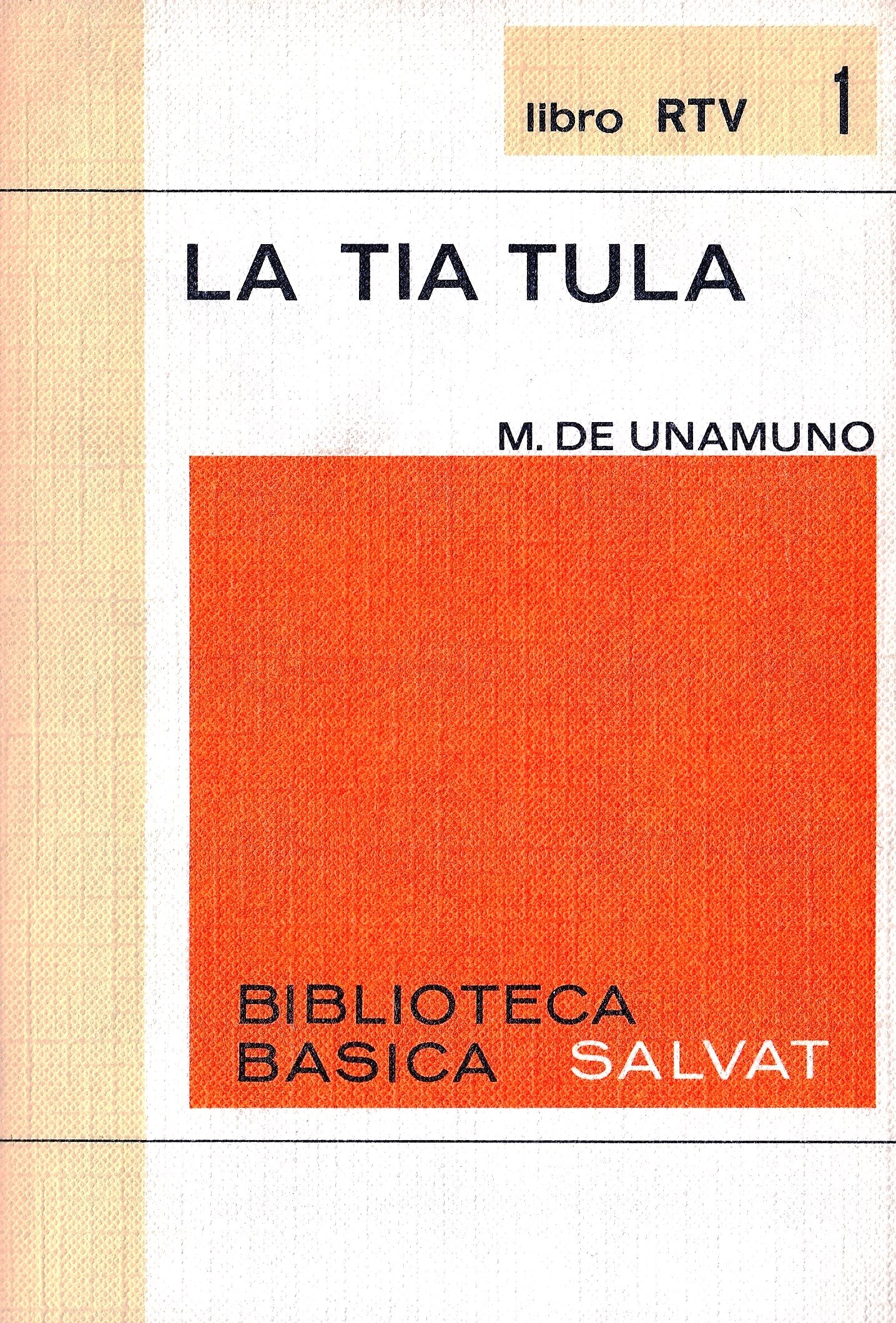
First title of Biblioteca Básica Salvat

In 1965, Salvat introduced Monitor, the first modern encyclopedia of the time with kiosk issues; the first edition of the Diccionario Enciclopédico Salvat Universal was released in 1969. The firm published also the Enciclopedia Salvat de la Fauna (1970–1973), directed by the Spanish naturalist and broadcaster Félix Rodríguez de la Fuente, and, after winning a public competition, the Biblioteca Básica Salvat, in collaboration with Alianza Editorial. This latter collection, whose aim was to disseminate classics of Spanish and world literature among the general public, had the advertising support of the Spanish national radio and television (RTVE); the simplicity of the design and its affordable price also contributed to the success of the collection.

At the end of the 1960s he closed the printing house in Barcelona, which he moved to Sant Boi de Llobregat and in 1968 he opened Gráficas Estella, an industrial plant located in Navarre. He allied with De Agostini to serve the French-speaking, German-speaking and English-speaking markets, successfully in France where Manuel Salvat, the founder's grandson, was among the first publishers. In the mid-1970s, the company had 4,000 employees. In Catalan he published the encyclopedic dictionary Salvat Català (1974–1977), in 8 volumes, and the Història de Catalunya (1978–79), in 6 volumes.

== French buyout ==
In 1988, the publishing house was acquired by the French multinational Hachette. In 1992, the Lagardère Group merged Matra, a new technology company, and Hachette, a communications company, to form Hachette-Matra.
