= Vino Volo =

Food & wine bar

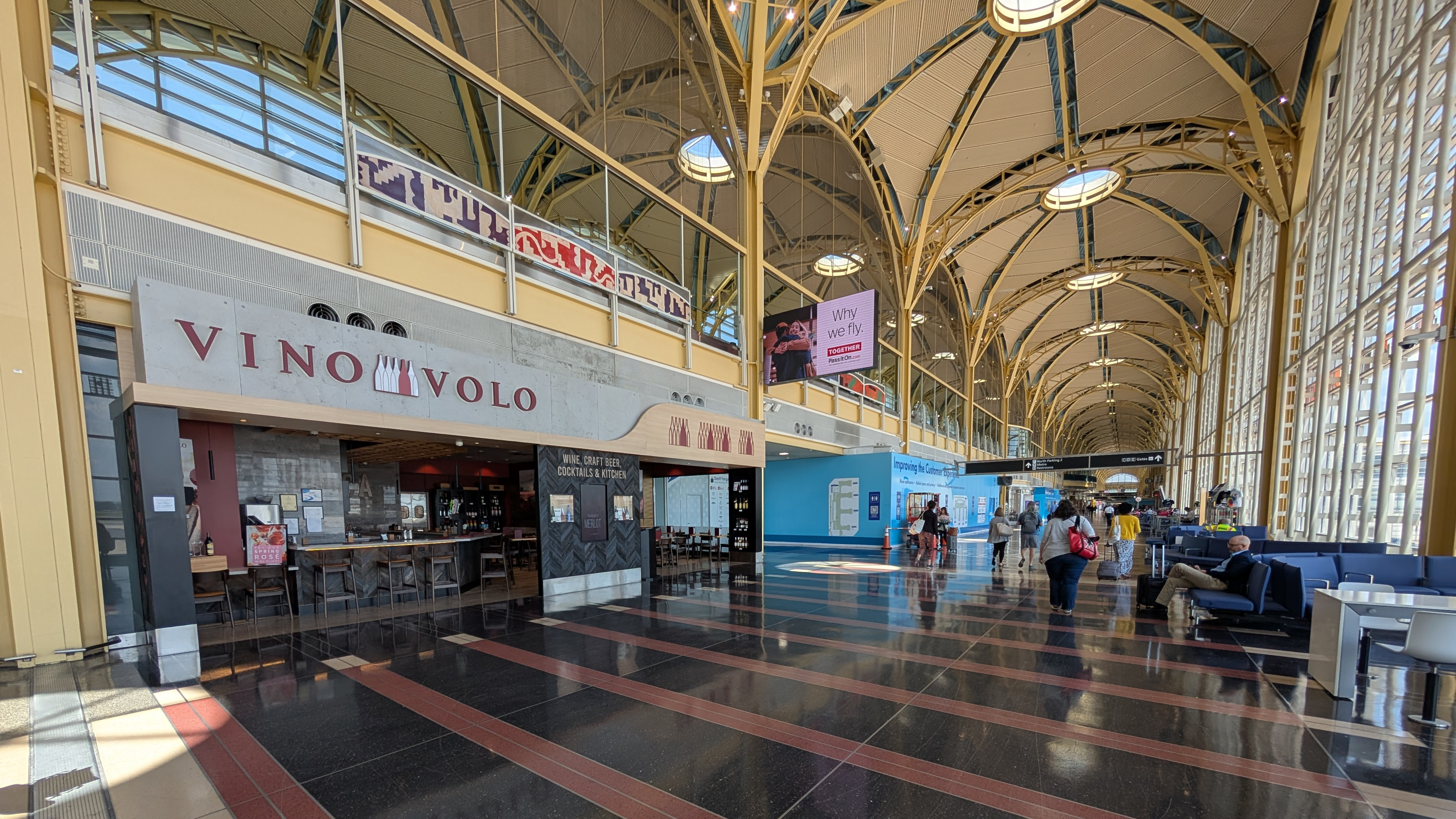
Vino Volo wine bar Washington National Airport (DCA)

Vino Volo (Italian for "wine flight") is a food and wine bar with a boutique wine shop. Founded by Doug Tomlinson in 2004 and bought by French travel and publishing giant Lagardère Group in 2017, the company operates in airports across the U.S. and Canada.

Vino Volo sells wines from around the world by the bottle, glass, or in tasting flights. Additionally, they sell a variety of food options to eat at the store, or "to go". Vino Volo offers a wine club for enthusiasts and a loyalty program to rewards its guests.

== History and locations ==
After a decade as a management consultant at Deloitte, where he explored many business schemes before settling on airport wine bars, Doug Tomlinson established Vino Volo's first location in September, 2005 at Washington DC’s Dulles International Airport. He later expanded to dozens of locations in the U.S. and a few in Canada. Its one city store, in Bethesda, MD, closed in 2017.

== Awards ==
Vino Volo has won 25 "Airport Revenue News" awards, including " Food Operator with Highest Regard for Customer Service" seven years in a row. In addition, Vino Volo was named the Best Airport Wine Bar at the 2nd Airport Food & Beverage awards.
