= Lagardère Publishing =

Book publishing arm of Lagardère

- Parent company: Lagardère Group (Louis Hachette Group)
- Country of origin: France
- Publication types: Books
- No. of employees: 6,968 (2018)

Lagardère Publishing is the book publishing arm of Lagardère Group.

== Publishing companies and imprints ==
=== France ===
- Calmann-Lévy
- Deux Coqs d'Or
- Disney Hachette Edition
- EDICEF
- Editions 1
- Editions du Chêne
  - E.P.A
- Éditions Dunod
- Editions Foucher
- Editions Stock
- Fayard
  - Editions Mille et une nuits
  - Editions Mazarine
  - Pauvert
- Gautier-Languereau
- Grasset
  - Grasset-Jeunesse
- Hachette
- Hachette Collections
- Hachette Éducation
- Hachette Français Langue Etrangère
- Hachette Jeunesse
- Hachette Littératures
- Hachette Pratique
- Hachette Tourisme
- Harlequin (under license from HarperCollins)
- Hatier
  - Editions Didier
    - Didier Jeunesse
  - éditions Foucher
  - Rageot Editeur
  - Hatier International
- Hazan
- Istra
- JC Lattès
- Le Livre de Paris
- Le Livre de Poche
- Le Masque Champs-Élysées
- Marabout
- Octopus France

=== United Kingdom ===
- Octopus Publishing Group
  - Bounty Books
  - Conran Octopus
  - Cassell Illustrated
  - Gaia Books
  - Godsfield Press
  - Hamlyn
  - Mitchell Beazley
  - Philip's
  - Spruce
  - Kyle
  - Ilex
- Chambers Harrap
- Hachette Children's Books
  - Franklin Watts
- Orion Publishing Group
  - Cassell Illustrated
  - Weidenfeld & Nicolson
- Headline Publishing Group
- John Murray
- Hodder & Stoughton
  - H&S Religious
  - Quercus
- Hodder Education
  - Hodder Arnold
  - Hodder Murray
  - Hodder Gibson
  - Teach Yourself
  - Philip Allan Updates
  - Chambers Harrap
- Little, Brown Book Group (UK)
  - Abacus
  - Virago Press
  - Sphere
  - Orbit
- Bookpoint (Distribution)
- Littlehampton Book Services (Distribution)

=== Australia ===
- Hachette Australia
- Headline
- Hodder
- Hodder Educational
- Little, Brown and Company
- Lothian Books (including Lothian Children's Books)
- Orion
- Sceptre
- John Murray
- Chambers
- Hachette Children's Books
- Octopus
- Piatkus

=== Canada ===
- Hachette Book Group Canada (English Books)
- Hachette Canada (French Books)

=== China ===
- Hachette-Phoenix (49%)

=== India ===
- Hachette India Archived 2023-03-14 at the Wayback Machine (English Books)

=== Italy ===
- Hachette Fascicoli

=== Ivory Coast ===
- Nouvelles éditions ivoiriennes (80%)

=== Japan ===
- Hachette Collections Japan KK

=== Poland ===
- Wiedza i Życie

=== Russia ===
- Azbooka-Atticus (49%)

=== Spain ===
- Grupo Anaya (Anaya, Alianza Editorial, Cátedra, Pirámide...)
- Bruño
- Salvat Editores

=== United States ===
- Hachette Book Group USA

== See also ==
- Hachette
- List of largest UK book publishers
- Bertelsmann
- Elsevier
- Holtzbrinck
- McGraw Hill
- Pearson
- News Corp
- Scholastic
- Thomson Reuters
- Wiley
