= Hachette (surname) =

Hachette is a French surname. Notable people with the surname include:

- Jean Nicolas Pierre Hachette (1769–1834), French mathematician
- Jeanne Hachette (1454–?), French heroine
- Louis Christophe François Hachette (1800–1864), French publisher
