= Arnaud de Puyfontaine =

French businessman (born 1964)

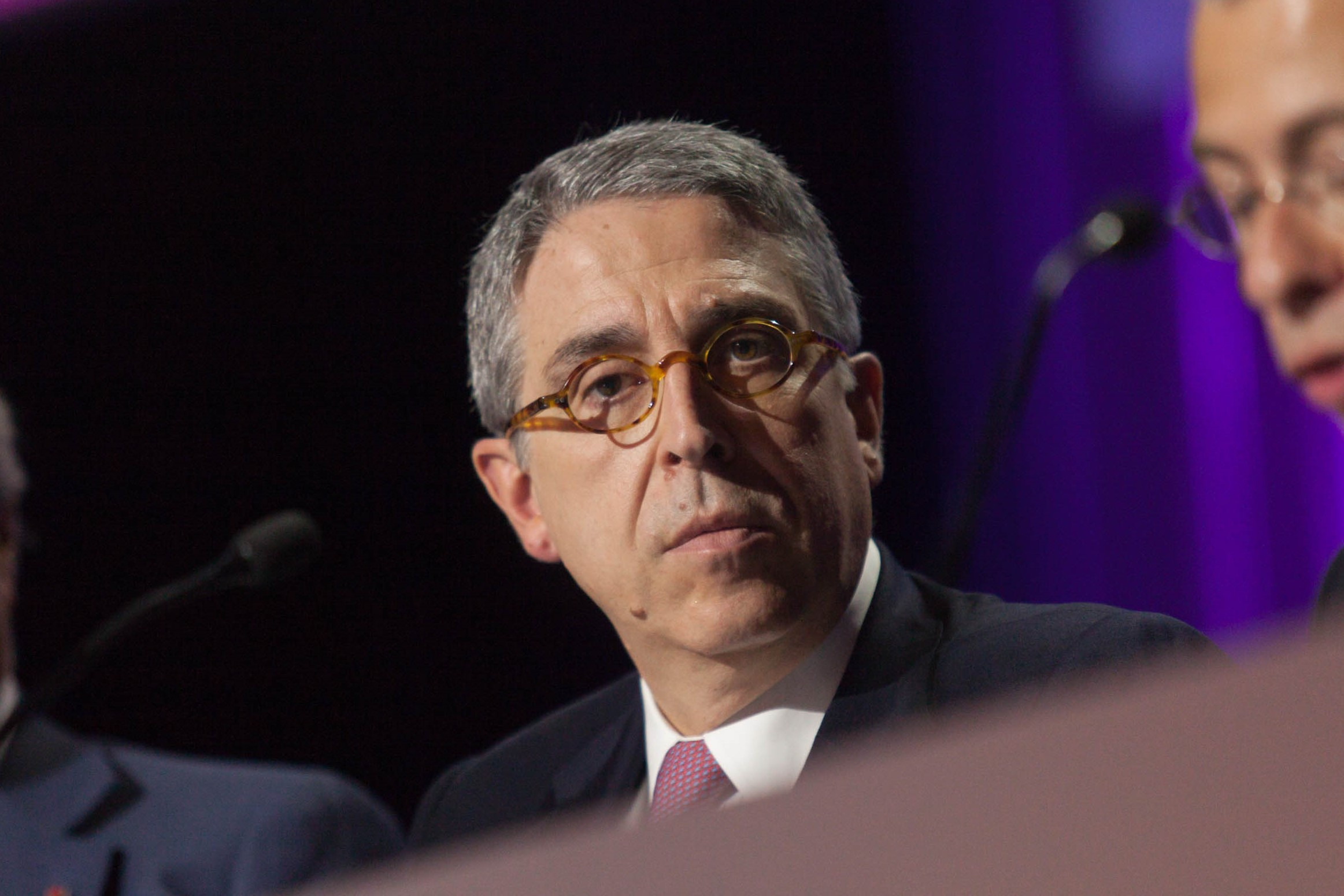
- Puyfontaine in 2015
- Born: 26 April 1964 (age 61); Paris, France
- Education: ESCP Business School, Harvard Business School, Institut Multimédias
- Occupations: CEO, Vivendi

Arnaud de Puyfontaine (French pronunciation: [aʁno də pɥifɔ̃tɛn]; born 26 April 1964) is a French businessman who has been the chief executive officer of Vivendi since 2014.

== Early life ==
Arnaud de Puyfontaine graduated from ESCP Europe in 1988, Institut Multimédias (1992) and the Harvard Business School.

== Career ==
Puyfontaine joined Le Figaro in order to develop relations between the newspaper and the Grandes écoles. He worked there for 3 years while completing his education. After a short period as a consultant at Arthur Andersen, he went to Indonesia to perform his national service. He then joined back Le Figaro and managed La Solitaire du Figaro under the direction of Philippe Villin.

In 1995 he joined Emap. He began by managing Télé Poche and Studio Magazine and was in charge of the purchase of Télé Star and Télé Star Jeux. He created the Emap Star division where he became deputy director, and in July 1998 he was appointed managing director of Emap France group.

The creation of the Emap Star division, which quickly became a heavyweight of the TV press, paved the way for his appointment as chief executive officer of the group. He was also a member of the board of Emap, Emap Digital Worldwide (1999–2006) and trustee of Emap Metro in the UK. At the same time, he became trustee (since 1998) and President (2004–2007) of Audipresse, the Association for the promotion of magazine publishers (APPM). Arnaud de Puyfontaine was also member of the board of the general information press and magazines' Union (from 1998).

In 2006 Emap plc sold its French subsidiary, which joined Mondadori group. Thanks to this purchase, the French magazine sector was opened for the Italian media group. In April 2006 Arnaud de Puyfontaine became President of Mondadori France holding, which aims at developing new activities. In this regard, he was appointed managing director for digital business of the Mondadori group. He resigned in August 2008 and became senior advisor to Maurizio Costa, vice-president and trustee of Arnoldo Mondadori Editore group.

In October 2008 Nicolas Sarkozy launched national consultations on printed media and nominated Arnaud de Puyfontaine as President of the "Print, transport, distribute, finance : how to regenerate industrial process of printed media?" working group. Later, he was tasked by the President of the French republic with a mission to follow up and implement decisions that have been taken and have influenced recent evolvements of the sector.

In April 2009 he created Elteg with Christophe Agnus and Rémi Poulet. Elteg is a technology and innovation company involved in enterprise content management (ECM) with its division named Walabiz, hotel industry (Kangaroo PMS), and publishes Sopixi, an e-shopping and free website development platform.

On 15 May 2009 he became CEO of The National Magazine Company (Natmags), British subsidiary of Hearst Corporation, responsible for European activities. In June 2011, following the acquisition of publications sold by Lagardère group, he was appointed Executive Vice-president of Hearst Magazine International. In May 2012 De Puyfontaine joined the board of Schibsted, one of the leading media groups in Scandinavia.

In January 2014 de Puyfontaine joined Vivendi as Senior Executive Vice President for media and content activities. On 24 June 2014 he was elected chairman of the management board.

In June 2021, he was appointed at the board of Lagardère Group, then was appointed at the board of TIM and at the head of the boards of Editis and Prisma Media.

== Other activities ==
=== Corporate boards ===
- Editis, chairman of the Board of Directors
- Prisma Media, chairman of the Board of Directors
- Telecom Italia, Member of the Board of Directors (since 2015)

=== Non-profit organizations ===
- Aspen Institute, Member of the Board of Trustees
- ESCP-Europe Alumni, President
- Le Siècle, Member
- MEDEF, Member of the Committee on Economic Dialogue
- Paris Europlace, Member of the Board of Directors
- French-American Foundation, President (2015–2018).

== Recognition ==
De Puyfontaine is Chevalier in the National Order of Merit and the Ordre des Arts et des Lettres.

== Personal life ==
His maternal grandfather, André-Marie Gerard, was editor-in-chief of L'Aurore from 1957 to 1960. Later, he was director of TV news programmes at the RTF and subsequently became Inspector-General of the ORTF.

== Notes and references ==
Business positions
Preceded by Jean-François Dubos	CEO of Vivendi; 2014–present	Succeeded by Incumbent
