= Voici =

French women's magazine

- Voici magazine cover, from the week of 1 May 2007.
- Editor: Hedi Dahmani
- Categories: Celebrity and Women's magazine
- Frequency: Weekly
- Circulation: 408,120 (2010)
- Publisher: Prisma Presse
- Founded: 1987; 38 years ago
- Company: Louis Hachette Group
- Country: France
- Based in: Paris
- Language: French
- Website: Voici
- ISSN: 0245-5803

Voici is a French language weekly celebrity and gossip magazine published in Paris, France.

== History and profile ==
Voici was founded in 1987. The magazine is published on a weekly basis and is based in Paris. The weekly was formerly owned by the German media company, Bertelsmann/Gruner + Jahr. The publisher is the Prisma Presse, formerly a subsidiary of Gruner + Jahr.

Vivendi acquired Prisma Media from Bertelsmann in 2020 and later the company spun-out its publishing operation (including Prisma Media and Voici) into Louis Hachette Group in 2024.

Voici claims the title of best selling French celebrity magazine, and second or third most widely read French women's magazine. It includes beauty, fashion, health, society and entertainment sections.

== Circulation ==
Voici had a circulation of 602,000 copies in 1991. Its circulation was 576,000 copies in 1998. In 2000 the circulation of the magazine was 514,180 copies and it was 522,042 copies in 2001.

The circulation of Voici was 493,000 copies during the 2007–2008 period. The weekly was the third best-selling celebrity magazine in France with a circulation of 408,000 copies in 2009. Its circulation was 408,120 copies in 2010.
