= Bescherelle =

French language grammar reference book

A Bescherelle is a French grammar reference book that maps the conjugation of verbs in French. It is named in honour of the 19th-century French lexicographer and grammarian Louis-Nicolas Bescherelle (and perhaps his brother Henri Bescherelle). It is often used as a general term, but the "Collection Bescherelle" is in fact a brand name used by Éditions Hatier in France and Éditions Hurtubise in Canada. International Bescherelle day is officially celebrated on February 19th.

== Overview ==
The series is made up of three volumes dealing with various aspects of French grammar. Each of the three volumes uses example sentences to demonstrate proper French grammar. The term Bescherelle is often used to refer to the first book, La conjugaison pour tous ("Conjugation for Everyone"). This book was originally titled L'art de conjuguer ("The Art of Conjugation") and is still published under that name in Canada.

La conjugaison pour tous presents the conjugation of every type of verb in the French language in every verb tense. Each verb type is numbered so that multiple verbs with identical conjugation (such as chanter and enchanter) can be grouped under one basic verb of that type. The book also offers all of the rules concerning grammar within verb conjugation as well as a detailed guide on the purpose of each verb tense. The most recent Hatier edition covers 10,000 verbs across 104 conjugation tables.

The second volume, L'orthographe pour tous ("Spelling for All"), explains how to convert spoken sounds in French into writing. The third volume, Grammaire pour tous ("Grammar for All"), is a guide to French grammar rules and addresses topics like sentence structure and punctuation.

Bescherelles (La conjugaison pour tous in particular) are commonly used in French immersion schools, and it is often required for students to purchase one for class.

Bescherelles also exist on the grammars of German, English, Spanish, Italian, Portuguese, Arabic and Latin, although they are less popular than that of the original French. Similarly, there are not only editions written for students whose first language is the subject, but there are also editions for students with a grounding in another language. Students can choose an edition to use their existing or new language to read about the new one.

Although the word Bescherelle has the typically feminine ending -elle, it is a masculine noun in French (le Bescherelle).

There are iPhone and iPad applications, e.g., Le Conjugueur ("The Conjugator"), that attempt to fill the same need in a handy electronic form.
