= Lagardère Group =

French media company

Lagardère S.A.

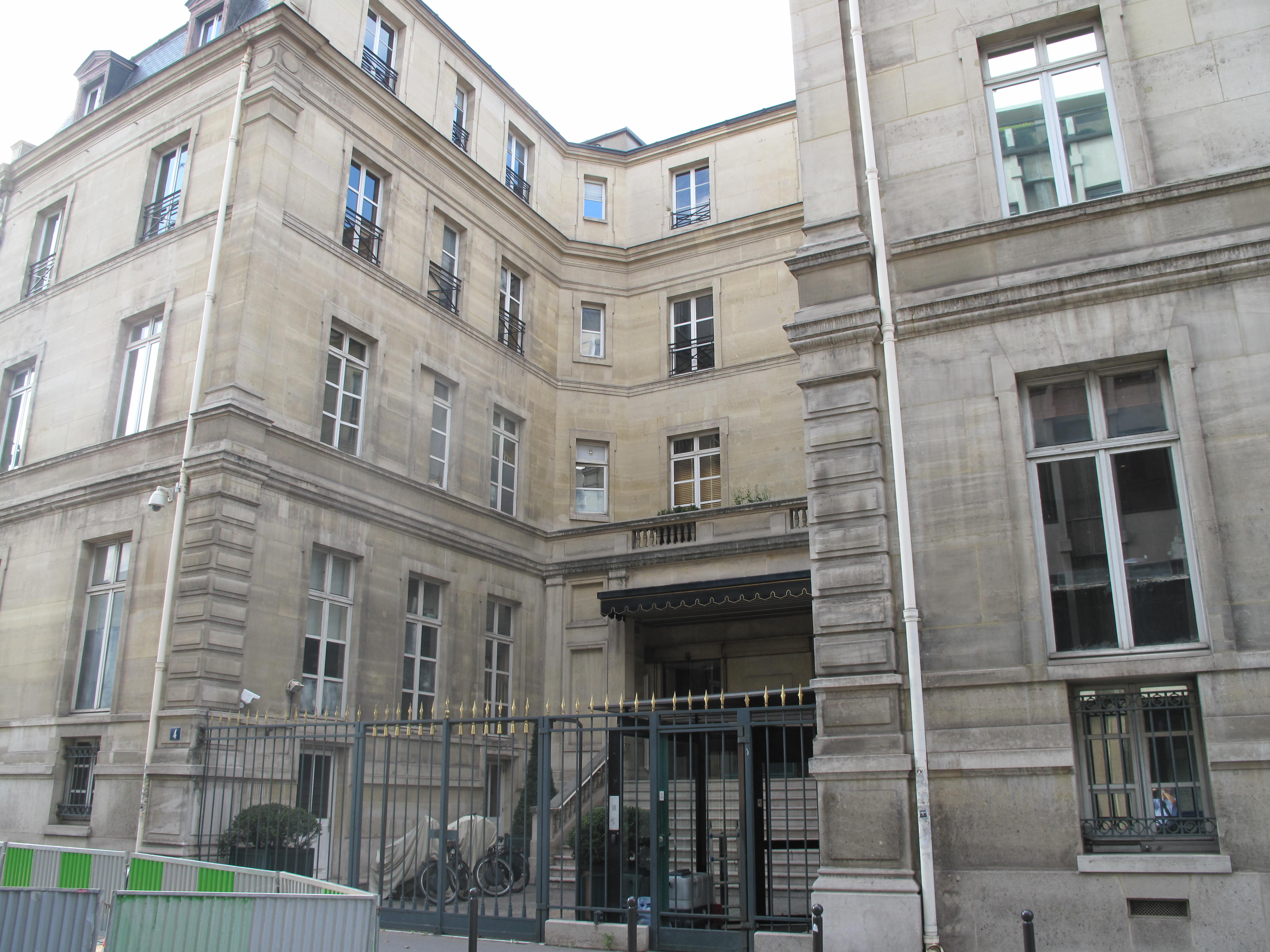
- Headquarters of Lagardère S.A. at Rue de Presbourg, Paris
- Type: Public
- Traded as: Euronext Paris: MMB
- ISIN: FR0000130213
- Industry: Publishing, Travel Retail, Live Entertainment, Media, sports club
- Founded: 1992; 34 years ago
- Founder: Jean-Luc Lagardère
- Headquarters: Paris, France
- Key people: Arnaud Lagardère (chairman and CEO)
- Products: Publishing (books, magazines, e-publishing, board games and premium stationery), retail outlets, live entertainment, radio stations, sports club
- Revenue: ▲€9,353 million (2025)
- Operating income: ▲€ 641 million (2025)
- Net income: ▲€ 203 million (2025)
- Total assets: ▲€ 9,721 million (2025)
- Total equity: ▲€ 1.022 billion (2025)
- Owners: Louis Hachette Group (66.29%); Vivendi (13,38 %); QIA (11.47%); Other (6.96%); Employees (1.88%)
- Number of employees: 33,112 (2025)
- Subsidiaries: Lagardère Publishing, Lagardère Travel Retail, Lagardère News, Lagardère Radio, Lagardère Live Entertainment, Lagardère Paris Racing
- Website: www.lagardere.com

Lagardère S.A. (French pronunciation: [laɡaʁdɛʁ]) is an international group with operations in over 50 countries. Based in the 16th arrondissement of Paris, the group was founded and created in 1992 by Jean-Luc Lagardère under the name Matra, Hachette & Lagardère.

Headed by Arnaud Lagardère, it is focused around two main divisions: Lagardère Publishing and Lagardère Travel Retail. While its book and e-publishing division (Lagardère Publishing) includes the major imprint Hachette Livre, its Travel Retail (Lagardère Travel Retail) unit includes store retail, largely in airports and railway stations.

The group's business scope also comprises other activities, mainly including Lagardère News (Le Journal du Dimanche and the Elle brand licence), Lagardère Radio (Europe 1, Europe 2, RFM), Lagardère Live Entertainment (production of concerts and shows and venue management) and Lagardère Paris Racing (sports club).

On November 21, 2023, Vivendi completed the purchase of a majority stake (60%) in Lagardère.

By the following year, Vivendi announced a major breakup of its businesses. As a result, Vivendi's shares in Lagardère were transferred to Louis Hachette Group prior to its listing on December of that year.

== History ==
=== Hachette and Matra, the foundation of Lagardère ===
The starting point for what would become the Lagardère Group was Louis Hachette's acquisition of Parisian bookstore Brédif in 1826. Hachette published magazines dedicated to public entertainment (Le Journal pour Tous ["Everyone's Newspaper"], 1855) and also took part in publishing the Dictionnaire de la Langue française ("Dictionary of the French Language") with his friend Littré, starting in 1863. In 1953, Hachette launched Le Livre de Poche with Henri Filipacchi.

Created in 1945, Matra (Mechanics/Aviation/Traction) was the company behind several technological projects, including creating a twin-engine aeroplane prototype able to travel at 800 km/h and breaking the sound barrier at Mach 1.4 in vertical flight for the first time in Europe. In 1990, Matra Espace and the aerospace division of Gec Marconi came together to create Matra Marconi Space. Matra Hautes Technologies joined the aerospace industry and officially became Aerospatiale Matra on June 11, 1999. EADS, or the European Aeronautic Defence and Space Company, later Airbus, was founded on July 10, 2000, from the merger of Aérospatiale Matra SA, Aeronautics SA, and DaimlerChrysler Aerospace AG. It officially launched the A380 program that same year. The aircraft would make its first flight in 2005.

=== Jean-Luc Lagardère and the birth of the group ===
In 1963, Jean-Luc Lagardère was appointed Chief Executive Officer of Matra, with 1,450 employees. In 1981, he became head of Hachette. In 1988, the group acquired Grolier Encyclopedias in the USA, its first overseas acquisition. In 1992, after a major year-long restructuring, Matra Hachette and Lagardère group were created. In 1990, Jean-Luc Lagardère turned to television and became head of La Cinq, which had been suffering from financial problems since it began operations in 1986. The network's financial problems would worsen after Lagardère took control, and La Cinq ultimately ceased operations on 12 April 1992 (it would be replaced by France 5 in late 1994).

=== Arnaud Lagardère and the group's refocus on media ===
In 1994, Hachette Livre launched the first multimedia encyclopedia, Axis. Also in 1994, Matra Hachette Multimedia presented EPSIS, the first image-substitution process for advertising. In 1998, Hachette Multimedia was born of the consolidation of the multimedia division of Hachette Livre and Grolier Interactive (online educational services). A strategic agreement signed in 2000 by Lagardère and Deutsche Telekom to provide Internet service led to the merger of T-Online and Club-Internet.

In 1995, Hachette acquired UCS, Canada's leading newsstand chain, and became the third largest operator in the international retail press trade. In 1996, Hachette Livre acquired the Hatier Group. In 1997, Hachette Livre won a string of literary prizes, including the Prix Goncourt and the Prix de l'Académie française with La Bataille (The Battle) by Patrick Rambaud (Grasset). That same year, Europe 1 and Club-Internet launched Europe Info. In 2000, Hachette Distribution Services created Relay, an international brand specializing in selling media products at public points of sale. That same year, Lagardère and Canal+ got into digital television. In 2001, Lagardère acquired the Virgin Stores brand and Virgin Megastore in France. Hachette Filipacchi Médias has continued its growth by taking a 42% stake in the Marie Claire Group.

=== From a conglomerate to a media-diversified group ===
With the death of Jean-Luc Lagardère on March 14, 2003, Arnaud Lagardère was appointed General Partner of Lagardère SCA. That same year, Lagardère sold off its interest in Renault as well as its automotive engineering business. In 2004, the Group acquired Editis. After antitrust review, Lagardère kept 40% of the company, including the imprints Larousse, Dalloz, Dunod, Nathan, Armand Colin and Sedes, as well as the Spanish division Grupo Anaya. The remainder was sold to Wendel. Lagardère took advantage of the growth of TNT to launch the youth channel Gulli in partnership with France Télévisions.

In 2006, Arnaud Lagardère created Lagardère Sports, a new subsidiary of the Group specializing in sports economics and sporting rights. Lagardère also became the new franchisee of the Croix-Catelan (Bois de Boulogne, Paris) and the Rue Eblé sports and recreation sites, for a twenty-year period. On May 31, 2010, Lagardère Sports changed its name and became Lagardère Unlimited, a new branch of the group specializing in the sport industry and entertainment.

On July 8, 2015, Lagardère Services was renamed Lagardère Travel Retail. On September 15 of that year, agencies of the Lagardère Group announced that they were being renamed under a common corporate brand: Lagardère Sports and Entertainment. This new brand would replace the brand of Lagardère Unlimited as one of the four divisions of the Lagardère Group. In addition, all sports marketing agencies within this division, including Sportfive, World Sport Group, IEC in Sports, Sports Marketing and Management and Lagardère Unlimited Inc., would be unified under a single commercial brand, Lagardère Sports, with all entertainment businesses under the brand Lagardère Live Entertainment.

=== 2010 shareholders meeting ===
Seventeen years after the creation of the limited partnership disputed by an American activist, the SCA (the French limited partnership with shares) was confirmed by nearly 80% of shareholders at the Shareholders Meeting on April 27, 2010.

=== Agreement between Lagardère SCA and Hearst Corporation ===
On March 28, 2011, Lagardère SCA signed a contract to sell its international magazine business, totaling 102 titles, to Hearst Corporation for €651 million. The transaction included a Master License Agreement (MLA) relating to the ELLE trademark in the 15 countries affected by the transfer, in return for which the Group would receive an annual recurring royalty payment. Lagardère would retain complete ownership of its magazine business operations in France and of its ELLE trademark throughout the world. The closing of the transaction remained subject to approval by local partners in certain countries as well as to certain customary governmental approvals and antitrust clearances in certain jurisdictions.

=== Sale of endurance sports division to WTC ===
In January 2016, Lagardère sold the endurance sports division to the World Triathlon Corporation. The transaction included the ITU World Triathlon Series races in Hamburg, Abu Dhabi, Kapstadt, Leeds and Stockholm; other running events like the Hamburg-Marathon, Hawkes Bay International Marathon, Marathon de Bordeaux, Queenstown Marathon and The Music Runs; and cycling events like the Cyclassics Hamburg, Velothon Berlin, Velothon Wales, Velothon Copenhagen, Velothon Stockholm and Velothon Stuttgart.

=== Sale of most of the media assets and sports agency ===
Since the first half of 2018, a plan to sell the Group's media assets (excluding Paris Match, Le Journal du Dimanche, Europe 1, Europe 2, RFM and the Elle brand licence) was underway at Lagardère Active. The Group had already divested a large number of assets, including international radio operations, the main digital assets (including e-Health), and the interest in Marie Claire. In 2019, Lagardère finalised the sale of most of the magazine publishing titles in France, the TV businesses, the stake in Mezzo and Disney Hachette Presse.

The Lagardère group finalized the sale of 75% of Lagardère Sports (excluding Lagardère Live Entertainment) to Hamburg-based private equity firm H.I.G. Capital on April 22, 2020.

In May 2020, the Group resisted a demand for the replacement of most of the board members, submitted by Amber Capital, its new largest shareholder. In August, peer French media conglomerate Vivendi raised its stake in the Group to 23.5%, the highest among all shareholders, including Amber (which raised its own by 2% to 20%). It made a pact with the fund in which the two jointly requested four seats, three for Amber and one for Vivendi, on the board.

In November 2020, Lagardère Studios, the entertainment television division of Lagardère Active was sold to French-based media production and distribution company Mediawan. In July 2021, Lagardère Sports was fully divested by the sale of remaining 25% to H.I.G. Capital.

=== Recent acquisitions ===
Lagardère Publishing acquired Perseus Books (2016), Bookouture (2017), La Plage (2018), Worthy Publishing Group (2018), Gigamic (2019), Blackrock Games (2019), Short Books (2019), Laurence King Publishing (2020), Workman Publishing (2021), Welbeck Publishing (2022), Sterling Publishing and 999 Games (2025). Lagardère Travel Retail completed the acquisitions of Paradies (2015), Hojeij Branded Foods (2018), International Duty Free (2019), Creative Table Holdings Ltd (2022), Marché International AG (2022) and Tastes on the Fly (2023).

=== Self-censorship ===
In 2022 the Financial Times reported that the Lagardère Group's Octopus Books had censored references in books to issues seen as sensitive in China, including information about Taiwan. One book had an entire section about Taiwan cut. The censorship was implemented to allow Octopus to continue to use low-cost Chinese book printers.

== Management ==
Since the conversion of the company into a joint-stock company with a board of directors on 30 June 2021, Arnaud Lagardère was appointed as chairman and chief executive officer.

The company is overseen by a board of directors, which has been chaired by Arnaud Lagardère since July 2021. Its other members are Valérie Bernis, Yannick Bolloré, Fatima Fikree, Marie Flavion (director representing employees), Pascal Jouen (director representing employees), Valérie Hortefeux, Véronique Morali, Arnaud de Puyfontaine, Michèle Reiser and Nicolas Sarkozy.

== Business lines ==
=== Lagardère Publishing ===
Lagardère Publishing is among the world's largest trade book publishers for the general public and educational markets, operating under the Hachette Livre imprint. The division is a federation of publishing houses which specialise in education, general literature, illustrated books, part works, dictionaries, youth works, book distribution, etc.

Lagardère Publishing operates predominantly in English, French, and Spanish.

The division also invested in leisure activities adjacent to the world of publishing with the acquisition of companies specialised in board games (Gigamic, Blackrock Games in 2019, La Boîte de Jeu in 2022 and 999 Games in 2025) and premium stationery (Paperblanks in 2022).

=== Lagardère Travel Retail ===
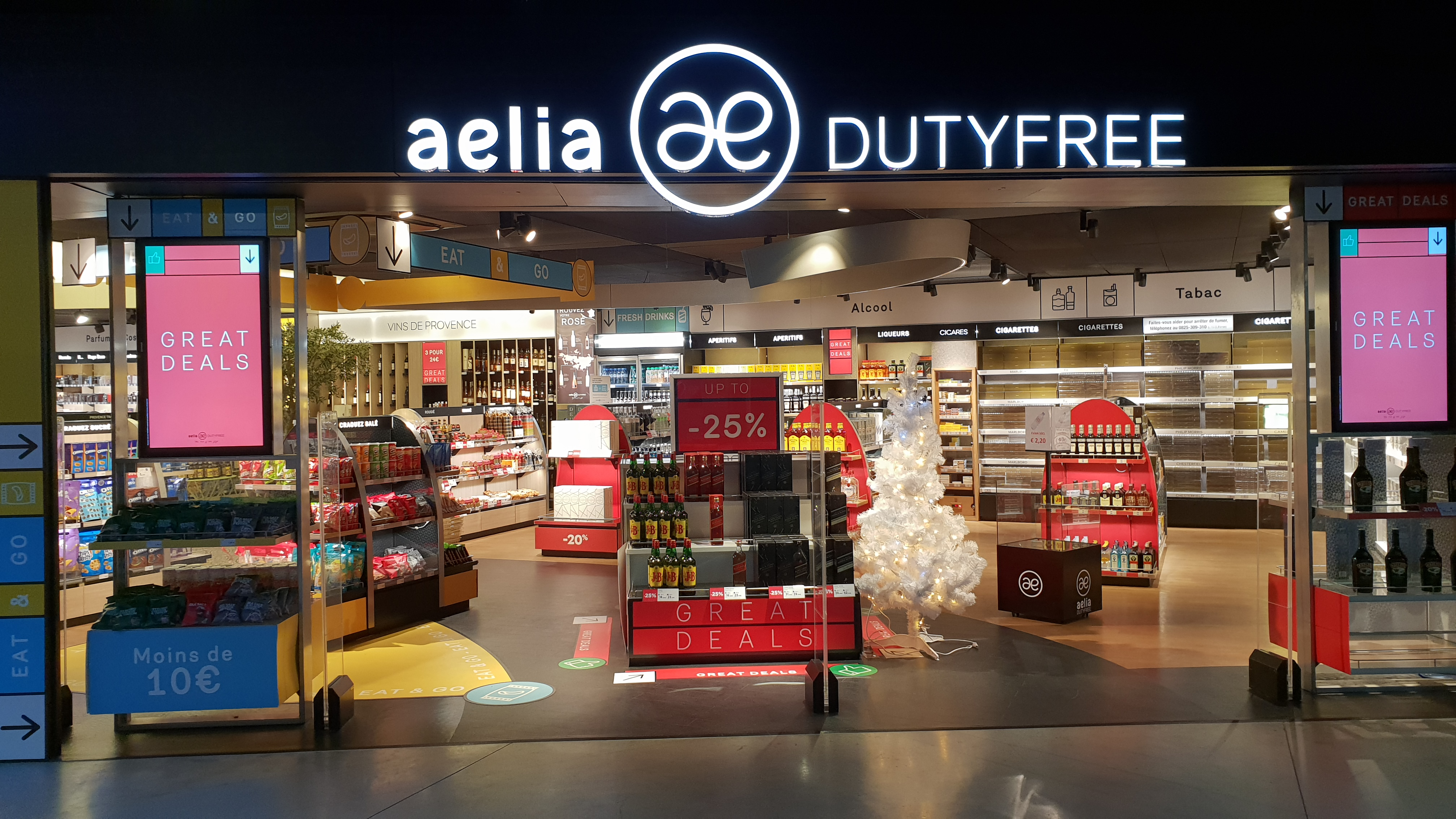
Aelia Duty Free store at Marseille Provence Airport

Lagardère Travel Retail is involved in Travel Retail (Travel Essentials, Duty Free & Fashion, and Foodservice). Aelia is a subsidiary of Lagardère that manages 270 duty-free shops in France, the United Kingdom, Poland, Ireland, Spain and New Zealand. In 2013, Aelia had sales of over €1,100 million.

At the end of 2013, Lagardère acquired the Dutch company Gerzon, including Gerzon Schiphol, Gerzon Duty Free and Gerzon Import. Gerzon has a long term concession for Fashion, Leather & Travel and has stores at Amsterdam Schiphol Airport, among them Hermes, Burberry, Victoria's Secret, Ralph Lauren and nine multi brands in Fashion and Leather & Travel. From December 1, 2015, Gerzon would become Lagardère Travel Retail the Netherlands.

In 2015, Lagardère Travel Retail acquired The Paradies Shops in North America, signing the agreement in August and completing the acquisition in October. Paradies and Lagardère Travel Retail in North America combined to become Paradies Lagardère.

In 2018, the division acquired Hojeij Branded Foods (HBF), a food service leader in the travel retail market in North America.

In 2019, Lagardère Travel Retail completed acquisition of International Duty Free (IDF), the travel retail market leader in Belgium, which also has operations in Luxembourg and Kenya.

In November 2022, it was announced Lagardère Travel Retail had acquired the Pfäffikon-headquartered multi-brand international catering company Marché International AG - holding company of Marché Group.

In November 2023, Lagardère Travel Retail acquired Tastes on the Fly, a North American Foodservice operator.

In 2025, Lagardère Travel Retail acquired a 70% stake in Schiphol Consumer Services Holding (Duty Free operator at Amsterdam Airport Schiphol).

=== Other activities ===
Lagardère News: Le Journal du Dimanche, Le JDNews, Le JDMag and the Elle brand licence.

Lagardère Radio: Europe 1, Europe 2, RFM

Lagardère Live Entertainment: venue operation and management (the Folies Bergère, Casino de Paris, Arkéa Arena), production of concerts and live shows, hosting and local promotional services for French and international productions.

Lagardère Paris Racing: sports club.

== Financial data ==
Key Figures (in millions of euros)
Year	2018***	2019	2020	2021	2022	2023	2024	2025
Net sales	6,868	7,211	4,439	5,130	6,929	8,081	8,942	9,353
Recurring operating profit	385	378	(155)	249	438	520	593	641
Finance costs, net	(57)	(53)	(76)	(64)	(74)	(97)	(138)	(124)
Income tax expense	(124)	(55)	31	(22)	(33)	(78)	(127)	(111)
Profit (loss) attributable to owners of the parent	177	(15)	(660)	(101)	161	144	168	203
Adjusted profit attributable to owners of the parent*	200	200	(330)	62	265	252	253	319

(*Excluding non-recurring/non-operating items ) / (**Restated for IFRS 15) / (***Restated for IFRS 16).

Distribution of Net Sales by Geographic Area
Year	2025
France	21%
Europe (excl. France)	43%
United States and Canada	26%
Asia-Pacific	5%
Latin America, Middle East and Africa	5%

Lagardère shares are listed at Euronext Paris.

== See also ==
- List of multinational corporations
- List of French companies
