= Conran Octopus =

Book publisher

- Parent company: Octopus Publishing Group
- Founder: Sir Terence Conran and Paul Hamlyn
- Official website: www.octopusbooks.co.uk/conran

Conran Octopus is a division of Octopus Publishing Group, a cross-platform illustrated book publisher. Including architecture, design and gardening. It was founded in 1984 by Sir Terence Conran and Paul Hamlyn, and publishes about eight titles a year. Conran's own book, The Essential Garden Book, co-authored with Dan Pearson, was published by the company.

== See also ==
- List of largest UK book publishers
