= Armand Colin =

French publishing house

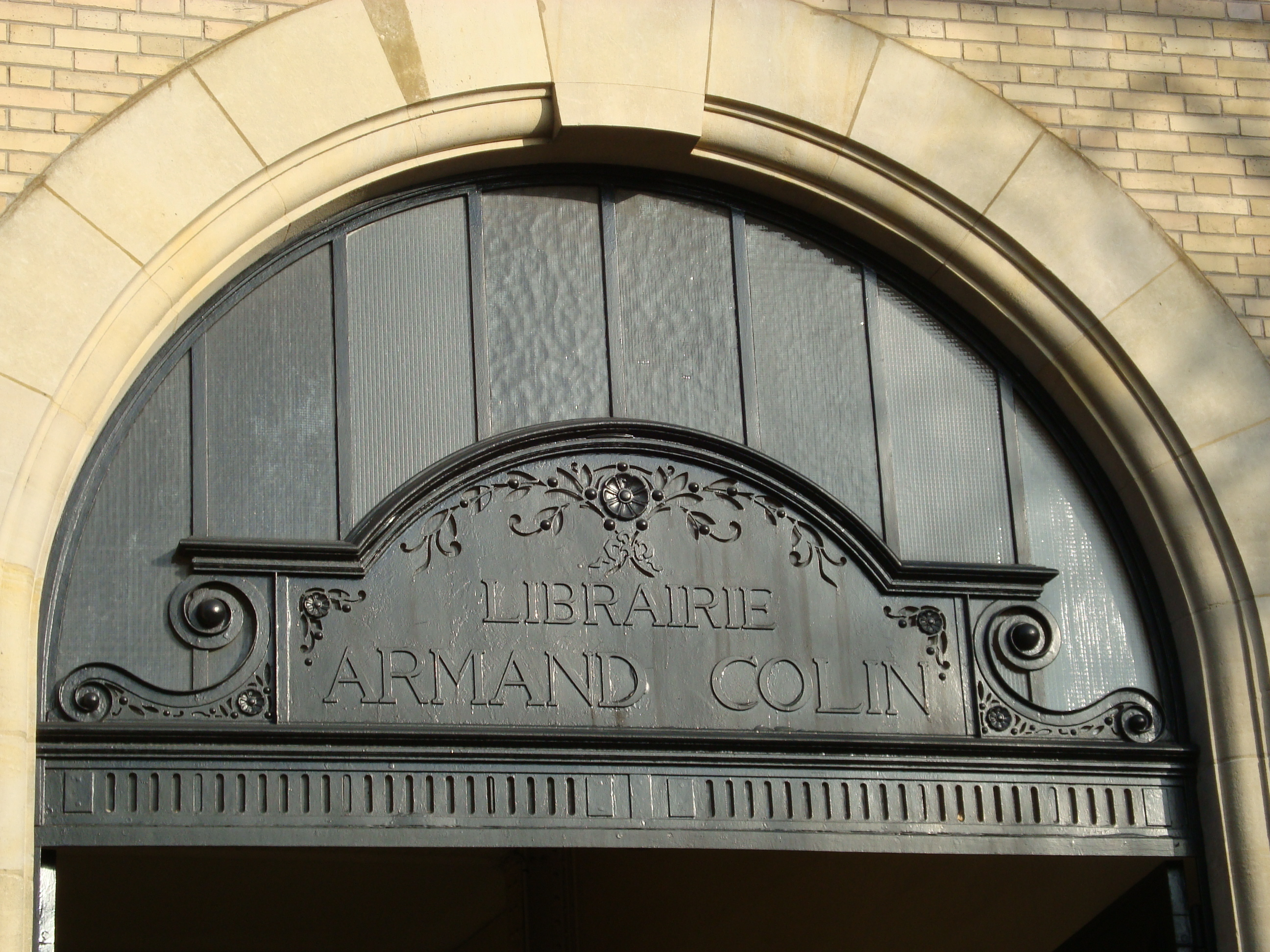
Armand Colin

Armand Colin is a French publishing house founded in 1870 by Auguste Armand Colin. It specializes in publishing works concerning human sciences, economics and education. Among its best-known publications are the "U" collection begun in 1968, and the "Cursus" collection. In 1987, Armand Colin was purchased by Masson which, in turn, became part of the City Group (Groupe de la Cité) in 1994. It is now owned by Hachette. In 2014, the house which shared its premises with Larousse moved to those of Dunod and merged with it.
