= Paradies Lagardère =

North American retail company

- Type: Subsidiary
- Industry: Travel Concessions
- Founded: Atlanta, Georgia, U.S. (1960)
- Founder: Dan & James Paradies
- Number of locations: 700+ stores (2026)
- Area served: United States and Canada
- Key people: Gregg Paradies (CEO); John Jamsion (President)
- Number of employees: 10,000+ (2026)
- Parent: Lagardère Group
- Website: ParadiesLagardère.com

Paradies Lagardère, the North American division of Lagardère Travel Retail, operates more than 720 retail stores and restaurants in airports across the United States and Canada.

== History ==
Founded as The Paradies Shops in 1960 by brothers James and Dan Paradies, the company’s first airport retail location was a toy store at Atlanta Municipal Airport, now Hartsfield-Jackson Atlanta International Airport. Since its founding, the company has expanded to operate more than 700 stores and restaurants across more than 90 airports in North America. As a part of Paris-based Lagardère Travel Retail, the company manages a portfolio of specialty retail, news and gift, and food and beverage concepts, including both national brands, locally focused offerings and proprietary concepts.

Key Dates:

- 1960: James and Dan Paradies open the first retail store officially operated by The Paradies Shops in Atlanta Municipal Airport.
- 1964: The company expands into New York LaGuardia Airport
- 1974: The Paradies Shops opens operations in Dallas and Detroit
- 1983: The first official industry RFP for concessions is issued by George Bush Intercontinental Airport; the competitive bid was won by The Paradies Shops.
- 1985: The Paradies Shops opens its first retail operation in a hotel.
- 1992: The first airport PGA TOUR Shop is opened by The Paradies Shops.
- 1993: Hojeij Branded Foods (HBF) is launched as a doughnut deliver service at Hartsfield-Jackson Atlanta International Airport by Wassim and Carol Hojeij.
- 1999: The Paradies Shops opens the first airport Brooks Brothers store.
- 2000: Canada's UCS Group merges with America's Eastern Lobby Shops and creates HDS Retail North America.
- 2004: The first airport Brighton store opens by The Paradies Shops.
- 2005: Vino Volo, North America’s airport oasis for wine, cocktails & shareable fare, was founded
- 2008: The Paradies Shops opens its 500^{th} store (in Atlanta)
- 2010: Private investment first, Freeman Spogli, invests in The Paradies Shops; the company is rebranded as Paradies.
- 2011: HDS Retail North America becomes LS travel retail North America.
- 2015: Lagardère Travel Retail acquires Paradies and merges it with LS travel retail North America to create a new industry leader in travel retail and dining – Paradies Lagardère.
- 2017: HBF acquires North America’s largest airport wine bar and wine retail chain, Vino Volo.
- 2018: Paradies Lagardère acquires Hojeij Branded Foods (HBF) and Vino Volo, and integrates it into its existing Dining Division.
- 2023: Lagardère Travel Retail acquires Tastes on the Fly, a leading food and beverage concessionaire. With the completion of this transaction, Paradies Lagardère becomes the second-largest operator of airport travel retail and food and beverage in North America.
