= Mitchell Beazley =

British book publisher

- Parent company: Octopus Publishing Group
- Founded: 1969
- Founder: James Alexander Hugh Mitchell and John Beazley
- Country of origin: United Kingdom
- Headquarters location: London
- Publication types: Books
- Official website: www.octopusbooks.co.uk

Mitchell Beazley Publishers Limited is a British book publisher which is particularly specialised in atlases, reference books, natural history books, cook books, garden books and wine books.

== History ==
The London-based company Mitchell Beazley was founded in July 1969 by James Alexander Hugh Mitchell (born 20 July 1939 in Epping, England) and John Beazley (born in 1932). They were financed by the map and atlas publisher George Philip and presented themselves for the first time at the Frankfurt Book Fair in Germany in 1969 with Patrick Moore's Moonflight Atlas. First titles which were published in 1970 were the Mitchell Beazley Atlas of the Universe by Patrick Moore and Golden Sovereigns by Nicolas Bentley.

In 1976, Mitchell Beazley made a joint venture project with the publisher International Visual Resource from the Netherlands where the encyclopedia The Joy of Knowledge was published. In the same year Mitchell's companion John Beazley died from cancer at age 44. Successful books which were published by Mitchell Beazley were The Joy of Sex by Alex Comfort and the Pocket Wine Book by wine expert Hugh Johnson. Johnson's first wine guide was published in 1977. Since then it is published annually. In May 1987, Mitchell Beazley became part of the Octopus Publishing Group.
