= Hachette Livre =

French publisher

Hachette Livre S.A.
- Parent company: Louis Hachette Group (through Lagardère Publishing)
- Founded: 1826; 200 years ago
- Country of origin: France
- Headquarters location: Paris
- Key people: Arnaud Lagardère (CEO and chairman)
- Official website: hachette.com

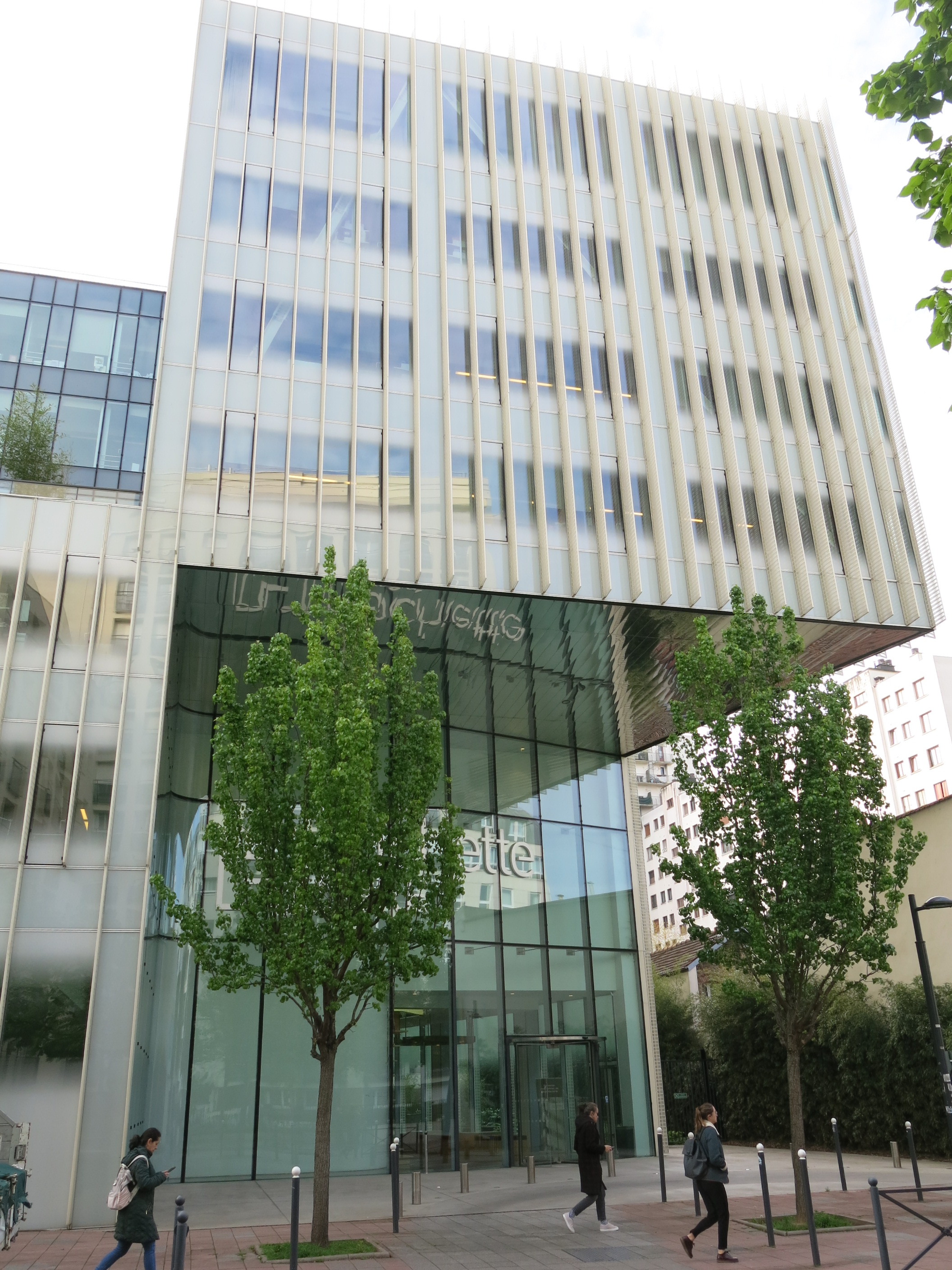
Hachette head office

Hachette Livre S.A. (French: [aʃɛt livʁ]; simply known as Hachette) is a French publishing group and public limited company established as a bricks-and-mortar specialty retailer in the Latin Quarter of Paris, France in the early 19th century. It was founded in 1826 by Louis Hachette as the bookshop Brédif, which later became successively L. Hachette et Compagnie (from French; English: "L. Hachette and Company"), Librairie Hachette ("Hachette Booksellers"), and Hachette SA before being given the name it is currently known by in France: Hachette Livre ("Hachette Book(s)"). After acquiring an Australian publisher, the company formed its Australian national subsidiary, Hachette Australia; in the UK, the company's British subsidiary became known as Hachette UK; and with its expansion into the United States, its American subsidiary was named Hachette Book Group.

Hachette Livre has been owned by the Lagardère Group since 1981 under their publishing division Lagardère Publishing. Lagardère Group in turn is majority owned by the French conglomerate Louis Hachette Group (LHG), resulting from the spin-off of Vivendi.

The company is today headquartered at 58 Rue Jean Bleuzen in the commune of Vanves in the suburban outskirts of Paris.

== History ==
=== France ===
It was founded in 1826 by Louis Hachette as Brédif, a bookshop and publishing company. It became L. Hachette et Compagnie on 1 January 1846, Librairie Hachette in 1919, and Hachette SA in 1977. The company was family led for several generations, including by Hachette's great-grandson, Robert Meunier du Houssoy. It was acquired by the Lagardère Group in 1981. In 1992, the publishing assets of Hachette SA were grouped into a subsidiary called Hachette Livre (French pronunciation: [a.ʃɛt liːvʁ]), the flagship imprint of Lagardère Publishing. Hachette has its headquarters in the 15th arrondissement of Paris. In 1996, it merged with the Hatier group, and acquired French art book publisher Fernand Hazan Éditeur soon afterwards. In 2004, Hachette acquired dictionary publisher Éditions Larousse.

=== International expansion ===
In 2002 UK publisher John Murray was acquired by Hodder Headline, which was itself acquired in 2004 by the Lagardère Group. Since then, it has been an imprint under Lagardère brand known as Hachette UK.

In 2004 Lagardère acquired Australian publisher Hodder Headline for Hachette Livre, who renamed it Hachette Australia.

In 2006 it expanded into the United States when it purchased Time Warner's book-publishing division, which was then renamed Hachette Book Group USA. Part of Time Warner's holdings was Australian independent publishing house Lothian Books, which was incorporated as an imprint.

In June 2013 Hachette announced that it would acquire the adult trade business of Hyperion Books from Disney. (Disney retained the young adult business and books related to existing Disney–ABC TV properties, under an expanded Disney–Hyperion imprint.)

In 2018 it announced its Robinson Millenials label, under which it would be publishing webcomics in partnership with Hiveworks Comics.

Hachette UK acquired Laurence King Publishing, original publisher of adult colouring book author and illustrator Johanna Basford, in August 2020. In 2022, it acquired Welbeck Publishing Group.

== Corporate affairs ==
Since April 2015 Hachette's headquarters have been located at 58 rue Jean-Bleauzen in Vanves (department Hauts-de-Seine, France).

Hachette's head office previously occupied a building at the intersection of the Boulevards Saint-Germain and Saint-Michel in the Saint-Germain-des-Prés area, then from 2006 to 2015 in Grenelle, in Paris's 15th arrondissement.

In June 2014 the company's U.S. affiliate in conjunction with Perseus Books Group, and Ingram Content Group, announced a three-way deal whereby Hachette would buy Perseus and then sell the company's client services businesses to Ingram. Financial details of the deal were not disclosed. However, in August 2014, the deal was called off because Hachette and the other parties involved decided the deal was too complicated. The deal eventually went through in April 2016 with Perseus's publishing assets and imprints going to Hachette, and distribution assets to Ingram.

Hachette's English-language businesses in the UK, and the US will be moved to a single management team in January 2024, with Hachette UK CEO David Chelley taking the same position at the Hachette Book Group USA and reporting to the Hachette Livre chairman and CEO Arnaud Lagardère.

== Company structure ==
Hachette Livre is involved in three core businesses: publishing, partworks and distribution.

=== Publishing ===
Hachette Livre has book publishing operations in their native France, as well as in Spain, Latin and North America (the former mostly in Mexico), the United Kingdom, Ireland, Russia, Australia, New Zealand, India, China, the Arab world (mostly in Lebanon and Morocco) and Francophone sub-Saharan Africa.

Region/Country	Units
France	Éditions Grasset; Grasset-Jeunesse; Fayard; Pluriel; Éditions Mazarine; Pauvert; Éditions Mille et Une Nuits; Stock; JC Lattès; Éditions du Masque; Éditions des Deux Terres; Calmann-Lévy; Éditions Kero; Éditions N°1; Orbit Books France; Le Livre de Poche; Le Livre de Poche Jeunesse; Audiolib; Hachette Éducation; Hachette Français Langue Étrangère; Istra; Groupe Alexandre Hatier; Les Éditions Foucher; Les Éditions Hatier; Hatier Jeunesse; Éditions Didier; Didier Jeunesse; Rageot; Éditions Dunod; InterÉditions; Armand Colin; Éditions Larousse; Gigamic; Harrap's; Dessain et Tolra; Hachette Illustré; Éditions La Plage; Hachette Jeunesse; Hachette Jeunesse Collection Disney (licensing agreement with The Walt Disney Company); Hachette Pratique; Hachette Tourisme; Éditions Marabout; Les Éditions du Chêne; Les Éditions E/P/A; Papier Cadeau; Hazan; Éditions Albert René (holder of Asterix comics); Pika Édition (French publisher of Japanese manga); Pika Roman; nobi nobi !; Éditions H2T (manfra); Éditions Deux Coqs d'Or; Gautier-Languereau; Hachette Romans; La Bibliothèque Rose et Verte
Spain and Latin America (Hachette España/Grupo Anaya)	Anaya; Anaya Educación; Anaya ELE; Anaya Infantil y Juvenil; Anaya Touring; Anaya Multimedia; PhotoClub; Oberon; Ediciones Cátedra; Bóveda; Edicións Xerais de Galicia (Galician); Algaida Editores; Editorial Bruño; Barcanova Editorial (Catalan); Edelsa; Grupo Editorial Patria (Mexico); Publicaciones Cultural; CECSA; Nueva Imagen; Promexa; Vox (Catalan and Spanish); Hachette Heroes e Infantil; Editorial Salvat; Larousse Spain; Ediciones Larousse (Mexico); Ediciones Pirámide; Tecnos; Alianza Editorial; AdN Alianza de Novelas
United Kingdom and Ireland (Hachette UK)	Headline Publishing Group; Headline Review; Eternal Romance; Tinder Press; Wildfire Books; Headline Home; Quercus; MacLehose Press; Jo Fletcher Books; Hodder & Stoughton; Spectre; Coronet Books; Yellow Kite; John Murray Press; John Murray; John Murray Learning; Two Roads; Hodder Faith; Nicholas Brealey Publishing; Jessica Kingsley Publishers; Bookouture; Little, Brown Book Group; Little, Brown; Abacus; Piatkus Books; Atom Books; Blackfriars; The Bridge Street Press; Constable; Corsair; Dialogue Books; Fleet; Hachette Audio UK; Paperblanks; Orbit Books UK; Sphere Books; Virago Press; Robinson Psychology; Orion Publishing Group; Orion Fiction; Victor Gollancz; Weidenfeld & Nicolson; Laurence King Publishing; Seven Dials; Orion Spring; Orion Trapeze; Orion Audio; Octopus Publishing Group; Short Books; Pyramid; Spruce; Cassell; Conran Octopus; Gaia; Godsfield Press; Hamlyn; Miller's; Mitchell Beazley; Philip's; Bounty Books; Ilex Press; Aster; Kyle Books; Summersdale Publishers; Hachette's Children's Group; Franklin Watts; Hodder's Children's Books; Orchard Books; Wayland Publishers; Orion Children's Books; Enid Blyton Entertainment; Quercus Children's Books; Pat-a-Cake; Wren & Rook; Hodder Education Group; Hodder Education; Hodder Gibson (Scotland); Galore Park; Rising Stars; RS Assessment; Hachette Ireland
North America (Hachette Book Group)	Grand Central Publishing; Twelve; Forever; Forever Yours; Goop Press (joint venture with Goop); Vision; Little, Brown and Company (United States); Back Bay Books; Jimmy Patterson (children's book imprint joint venture with James Patterson); Little, Brown Spark; Mulholland Books; Little, Brown Books for Young Readers; LB Kids; Poppy; Perseus Books Group; Avalon Travel; Basic Books; PublicAffairs; Running Press; Hachette Books; Da Capo Press; Orbit Books; Redhook; Hachette Nashville; FaithWords; Center Street; Worthy Publishing; Yen Press (joint venture with Kadokawa Corporation); JY (graphic novels aimed towards middle grade readers); Hachette Audio USA
Australia and New Zealand	Hachette Australia; Lothian Children's Books; Hachette New Zealand; Moa (English- and Māori-language children's picture books)
Other markets	Hachette Antoine (Lebanon; joint venture with Librairie Antoine); Librairie Papeterie Nationale (Morocco); Éditions Nei-Ceda (Francophone sub-saharan Africa; based in Ivory Coast) (70%); Azbooka-Atticus (Russia) (49%); Hachette-Phoenix (China; joint venture with Phoenix Publishing and Media); Hachette India

=== Partworks ===
Hachette distributes partworks to France, Belgium, Switzerland, Canada, Spain, Portugal, Brazil, Argentina, Uruguay, Ecuador, Chile, Colombia, Mexico, Peru, the United Kingdom, Ireland, Australia, New Zealand, South Africa, Italy, Greece, Germany, Austria, Poland, Japan, Taiwan, Hong Kong, Russia, the Czech Republic, Romania, Slovakia, Belarus, Croatia, Hungary and Bulgaria.

- Hachette Collections (France; also distributed in Francophone parts of Belgium, Switzerland and Canada)
- Kolekcja Hachette (Poland)
- Hachette Partworks Ltd. (United Kingdom)
- Hachette Kollektsia (Russia)
- Hachette Fascicoli (Italy; also distributed in Greece, Romania, the Czech Republic, Slovakia, Croatia, Hungary and Bulgaria)
- Hachette Collections Japan
- Editorial Salvat (Spain and Latin America)

=== Distribution ===
- Hachette Livre Distribution (France)
- Dilibel (Belgium)
- Diffulivre (Switzerland)
- Hachette Canada
- Lightning Source France (joint venture with Lightning Source)
- Bookpoint (United Kingdom)
- Hachette UK Distribution
- Alliance Distribution Services (Australia)
- HBG Cilent Services (United States)
- Comercial Grupo Anaya (Spain)

== See also ==
- Books in France
- Hachette Books
- Hachette Book Group
