= Louis Hachette =

French magazine publisher (1800–1864)

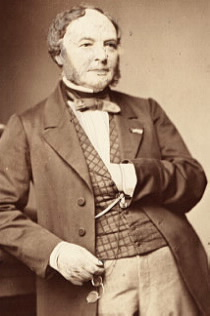
- Born: Louis Christophe François Hachette; 5 May 1800; Rethel, Ardennes, France
- Died: 31 July 1864 (aged 64); Paris, France
- Education: École Normale Supérieure
- Occupation: Publisher
- Known for: Founder of Hachette publishing house
- Spouse(s): Amélie Barbedienne (m. 1827; d. 1832); Pauline Auzat (m. 1836)
- Children: 4

Louis Christophe François Hachette (French: [lwi kʁistɔf fʁɑ̃swa aʃɛt]; 5 May 1800 – 31 July 1864) was a French publisher who established a Paris publishing house designed to produce books and other material to improve the system of school instruction. Publications were initially focused on the classics and subsequently expanded to include books and magazines of all types. The firm is currently part of a global publishing house, Hachette Livre.

== Early life ==
Hachette was born on 5 May 1800 at Rethel in the Ardennes département of France. He was a son of Jean Hachette (1775–1840) and Marie Ledouble (1781–1862).

After studying for three years at the prestigious École Normale Supérieure with the intention of becoming a teacher, in 1822, he was expelled, on political grounds. In 1826, after briefly studying law, Hachette opened Brédif, a bookshop located near the Sorbonne in Paris. The focus of the business was to produce works designed to improve the system of school instruction and to promote general culture in the community. He published manuals on various topics including dictionaries of modern and ancient languages, educational journals, and French, Latin and Greek classics annotated by the most eminent authorities.

== Milestones ==
In 1833, the Guizot Schools Law was passed which required all municipalities to open a primary school. Louis Hachette had been putting together an alphabet primer since 1829 and his was the only company capable of responding to the public order for a million textbooks.

In 1846, the L. Hachette & Company was founded. That year, Emile Littré signed a contract with the new firm to publish a dictionary, the first volumes of which appear in 1863. In 1852, Hachette contracted with seven railway companies to create station bookstalls. In addition to travel guides for rail passengers, the small outlets sold novels by authors including Charles Dickens, Gérard de Nerval, George Sand and the children’s series Bibliothèque Rose, including those by La Comtesse de Ségur.

In 1855 Hachette founded Le Journal pour tous, a publication with a circulation of 150,000 weekly. He started printing Le Tour du Monde, a weekly travel journal, in January 1860.

Hachette also manifested great interest in the formation of mutual friendly societies among the working classes, in the establishment of benevolent institutions, and in other questions relating to the amelioration of the poor, a subject on which he wrote various pamphlets. He also lent the weight of his influence towards a just settlement of issues relating to international literary copyright.

== Personal life ==
Hachette was married twice, first to Amélie Catherine Marie Agathe Barbedienne (1803–1832) on 17 February 1827 in Paris. Before her death, they were the parents of:

- Marie-Joséphine Hachette (1828–1831), who died young.
- Louise Agathe Hachette (1829–1900), who married Emile François Templier in 1849.
- Alfred Louis Hachette (1832–1872), who married Marie Aumont in 1861.

After Amelie died in 1832, he married Pauline (née Royer) Auzat (1804–1872), the widow of Édouard Jean Maurice Auzat, on 29 January 1836 in Paris. Before his death, they were the parents of a son:

- George-Jean Hachette (1832–1892), who married Marie Teyssier in 1868.

Hachette died in Paris on 31 July 1864.

== See also ==
- Hachette
