= Hatier =

French publishing house

- Parent company: Lagardère Publishing
- Founded: 1880
- Country of origin: France
- Headquarters location: Paris
- Key people: Célia Rosentraub
- Official website: editions-hatier.fr

Hatier (pronounced [a.tje]) is a French publishing house specializing in scholarly works and educational materials, now integrated into the Hachette group.

Founded in 1880 by Alexandre Hatier, Hatier obtains 20% of its sales through international affiliates in Brazil, Morocco, Côte d'Ivoire, and Spain.

== History ==
After its 1880 foundation, "la Librairie Hatier" began to publish coffee table books, then became known as early as 1886 for its first scholarly books, works in the natural sciences and "object lessons" for primary school. In 1890, Alexandre Hatier published the first Bescherelle. After Hatier's departure in 1927, his granddaughter Blanche took over the business, with the assistance of Jean and Michel Foulon.

Starting in 1970, Éditions Hatier further developed its line of extracurricular materials. The "Bescherelle" collections—which teach French grammar—and the "Profil" imprint—which present various aspects of literary masterpieces—remain popular reference works in their respective domains.

In 1996, the Alexandre Hatier Group integrated with Hachette. The group has been directed by Célia Rosentraub since 2009.
