= List of magazines in Germany =

List of German magazines

The following is an incomplete list of current and defunct magazines published in Germany. Their language may be German or other languages.

== 0-9 ==
- 11 Freunde
- 1000°
- 4x4action
- 5vor12
- 7 Tage, 7 Köpfe

== A ==
- ABC-Zeitung
- Abenteuer Archäologie
- ABI Technik
- ADAC Motorwelt
- Aero International
- Aerokurier
- akkordeon magazin
- Adel Aktuell
- Der Aktionär
- Die Aktuelle
- Alles für die Frau
- Alpentourer
- Alpin
- Angelsee Aktuell
- Anker
- Anna
- Aquaristik
- Der Ararat
- ARCH+
- Architectural Digest
- Architektur & Wohnen
- Architektur der DDR
- Armbanduhren
- arrive
- art kaleidoscope
- Astrowoche
- Atze
- Audio + Stereoplay
- Audio Test
- auf einen Blick
- Aufwind
- Auszeit
- Auto Bild
- Auto Bild Allrad
- Auto Bild Motorsport
- Auto Bild Reisemobil
- Auto Bild Sportscars
- Auto Magazin
- Auto Strassenverkehr
- Auto Test
- Autozeitung
- Avanti

== B ==
- Bahamas
- Bahn Extra
- Bauen & Renovieren
- Basteel-Ideen
- Bauhaus
- Baumeister
- Der Bazar
- Bella
- Bergsteiger
- Berlin Rom Tokio
- Berliner Illustrirte Zeitung
- Der Bibel'sche Orient
- Bike & Travel
- Bike Bild
- Bild+Funk
- Bild der Frau
- Bild der Frau Gut kochen & backen
- Bild der Frau Schlank & fit
- Bildungspraxis
- Blinker
- Blix
- Boa Vista
- Bodos Power Systems
- Boote
- Bootswelt
- Börse Online
- Box Sport
- Die Brennessei
- Brigitte
- Bravo
- Bravo Girl
- Bravo Hip Hop Special
- Bravo Screenfun
- Bravo Sport
- Bunte
- Burda Style

== C ==
- Camper Vans
- Camping, Cars & Caravans
- Campingbusse
- Capital
- Caravaning
- Carina
- Centurion
- Chip
- Chip Foto Video
- Chrismon
- Chronos
- Cicero
- Cinema
- Civis mit Sonde
- Clausewitz
- Clever Campen
- Computer Bild
- Computer Zeitung
- Connect
- Cosy
- Couch
- Cradle
- CrunchTime
- c't

== D ==
- Damals
- Die Dame
- DAV Panorama
- Deco Home
- Dein Spiegel
- Deine Gesundheit
- Das Deutsche Mädel
- Deutsches Ärzteblatt
- Die 2
- Digital photo
- Dogs
- Donna
- dotnetpro
- DU&ICH
- DUZ

== E ==
- E Living
- Echo der Frau
- Egység
- Ein Herz für Tiere
- Einfach los
- Eisenbahn-Kurier
- Electric Drive
- EMMA
- Essen + Trinken
- Eltern
- Erfolg Magazin
- Euro am Sonntag
- The European
- European Coatings Journal
- European Photography
- Exberliner

== F ==
- Fahrradland
- Feel Good
- Fernsehwoche
- FFussball
- Fikrun wa Fann
- Fisch & Fang
- Filmspiegel
- Finanzplus
- Finanztest
- Five
- Fix und Foxi
- Flieger Revue
- Fliegermagazin
- Flow
- Flug Revue
- Flugzeug Classic
- Focus
- Focus-Gesundheit
- Focus Money
- Fono Forum
- Form und Zweck
- Frau aktuell
- Frau im Leben
- Frau im Spiegel
- Frau im Trend
- Frau mit Herz
- Frau von Heute
- Freeride
- Freizeit direkt
- Freizeit Post
- Freizeit Revue
- Freizeit Spass
- Freizeit Vergnügen
- Freizeitwoche
- Freundin
- Die Freundin
- Fuldaer Geschichtsblätter
- Funk Uhr
- Für Dich
- Für Sie

== G ==
- Gala
- Game Master
- Garten Flora
- Garten & Wohnen Träume
- Gartenfreund
- Die Gartenlaube (1853–1944)
- Gartenspaß
- Geld Idee
- Die Gesellschaft
- GEO
- GEO Epoche
- Geliebte Katze
- German Life
- Gesund & Aktiv
- Glücks Revue
- Gluten Free
- Das Goldene Blatt
- Golf Magazin
- Gong
- Goodlife
- Graswurzelrevolution
- Gravel Touren
- Greenpeace Magazine
- Greta
- Guido
- Guter Rat!

== H ==
- Halali
- Handballwoche
- Happy
- Hartbeat Magazine
- Healthy Life Low Carb
- Heimkino
- Heimwerker Praxis
- Herzstück
- Hirschhausens Stern Gesund leben
- Hochzeitsplaner
- Hörzu
- Der Hund

== I ==
- Ich bin
- Illustrirte Zeitung
- Impulse
- IN
- Interieur Wohnen
- Internationale Politik
- Italien

== J ==
- Jäger
- Jessy & Friends
- JetPower
- Jolie
- Joy
- Journal für die Frau
- Jugend
- Jugend und Technik
- Juice
- Just Kick-it!

== K ==
- Kajak Magazin
- Kanu Magazin
- Kaveh
- Kicker
- Kitelife
- kochen & genießen
- Konr@d
- Koralle
- Kultur im Heim
- Kunst und Künstler

== L ==
- Landapotheke
- Landidee
- Landidee Altes Wissen
- Landidee Ausflüge
- Landidee Rezeptreihe
- Landidee Traumgarten
- LandKind
- Landleben
- Landlust
- Landzauber
- Laura
- Der Landser
- Lea
- Lecker
- Das Leben
- Leichtathletik
- Lisa
- Das literarische Echo
- Lust auf Genuss
- Lustige Blätter
- Lydia

== M ==
- Mac & i
- Mach mal Pause
- Macwelt Special
- Mad
- Das Magazin
- Manager Magazin
- Männer
- Mare
- Markt und Mittelstand
- Max
- Maxi
- Meggendorfer-Blätter
- Mein Buffet
- Mein Geheimnis
- Mein Küchengarten
- Mein Pferd
- Mein ZauberTopf
- mein schöner Garten
- mein schöner Landgarten
- mein schönes Land
- Mein TV und ich
- Meine Gartenwelt
- Meine Familie & Ich
- Meine Melodie
- Meine Pause
- Meine Stars von Dammals
- Meins
- Melodie und Rhythmus
- Mercedes Tuner
- Merian
- Merkur
- Messer Magazin
- Metal Hammer
- Micky Maus
- Mike, der Taschengeldexperte
- Militär & Geschichte
- Mini
- Modell Eisen Bahner
- Modellflug International
- Mono.Kultur
- Motor Klassik
- Motorrad
- Motorrad Abenteuer
- Motorrad Classic
- Motorsport Aktuell
- MyBike
- Myillu
- myself

== N ==
- Nation und Europa
- Natur
- Natur + Umwelt
- Neon
- Neon Zombie
- Das Neue
- Neue Berliner Illustrierte
- Das Neue Blatt
- Neue Post
- Das Neue Russland
- Neuer Weg
- Neue Werbung
- Neues Leben
- Nido
- Nur für die Frau
- NurTV

== O ==
- Off Road
- Opernwelt
- Der Orchideengarten
- Orkus
- Ostara
- Outdoor Welten
- Öko-Test

== P ==
- Palstek
- Pan
- PANTA RHAI
- pardon
- Partner Hund
- Patchwork
- Petra
- Das Pfennig-Magazin
- Pferde fit & vital
- Phöbus
- Physik Journal
- Pirsch
- Das Plakat
- Play5
- Praxis Kommunikaton
- Prima Woche
- Procycling
- Professional Tools
- Promobil
- PS

== Q ==
- Quarter Horse Journal
- Der Querschnitt
- Quick

== R ==
- Rad & Kette
- Radfahren
- Rasselbande
- Räte-Zeitung
- Reisemobil International
- RennRad
- RevierSport
- Revue des Monats
- Revue Heute
- Rezepte mit Herz
- Rezepte pur
- Roadbike
- Romantisch Wohnen
- Rotor
- Runner's World
- Rute & Rolle

== S ==
- Sabrina
- Samsung Galaxy Handbuch
- Satvision
- Sauen
- Schnitt
- Schöne Welt
- Schöne Woche
- Schöner Wohnen
- Schule
- Segeln
- Seidels Reklame
- Selber Machen
- Selbst ist der Mann
- Séparée
- Sibylle
- Signum
- Simplicissimus
- Sinn und Form
- Skimagazin
- Skipper Bootshandel
- Sleep
- smarte öko-häuser
- Spektrum der Wissenschaft
- Dein Spiegel
- Der Spiegel
- Spass für mich
- Sport auto
- Sport Bild
- Stern
- Stern Fotografie
- Stilvoll Wohnen
- Straßenbahn Magazin
- Studentenkurier
- Der Sturm
- Super TV
- Surf

== T ==
- Tauchen
- Tätowier Vorlagen
- Technikus
- Tempo
- Tennis Magazin
- Think:act
- Tina
- tina Koch & Back-Ideen
- Titanic
- Tour
- Traktor Classic
- Traumwohnen
- Truck Modell
- tv14
- TVdirekt
- TV Digital
- TV für mich
- TV-Hören und Sehen
- TV klar
- TV-Movie
- TV piccolino
- TV pur
- TV Schlau
- TV Spielfilm
- TV Sudoku
- Tweed
- Twen

== U ==
- Uhren-Magazin
- Ulenspiegel
- Über Land und Meer

== V ==
- Veggie Journal
- Viel Spass
- View
- Vinyl
- Visier
- Viva
- Von Frau zu Frau

== W ==
- Der Wahre Jacob
- wanderlust
- Welt der Wunder
- Werde
- Das Wespennest
- White Dwarf
- Wild und Hund
- Wingsurfers
- Wirtschaftswoche
- Woche der Frau
- Woche heute
- Wohnen & Garten
- Wohnen in Landhausstil
- Wohnidee
- WOM magazin

== Y ==
- Yacht

== Z ==
- Zenith
- Zeit Campus
- Zeit Wissen
- Zeitschrift für Musikwissenschaft
- Zillo
- Zuerst!
- Zuhause Wohnen

== See also ==
- List of newspapers in Germany
- Media of Germany
