= Funk Uhr =

Weekly television magazine in Germany

- Logo of Funk Uhr
- Categories: Television magazine
- Frequency: Weekly
- Circulation: 315,914 (Jan-March 2020)
- Publisher: Mediengruppe Klambt
- Founded: 1952; 74 years ago
- Company: Funke Mediengruppe
- Country: Germany
- Based in: Hamburg
- Language: German
- Website: Funk Uhr
- ISSN: 0932-6871

Funk Uhr is a German-language weekly television magazine published in Hamburg, Germany. Founded in 1952 it is one of the oldest magazines in the country.

== History and profile ==
Funk Uhr was established in 1952. The magazine was part of Axel Springer SE and was also published weekly by the company. In 2013 the company sold the magazine to Funke Mediengruppe. It is published weekly by Mediengruppe Klambt on Fridays.

The weekly has its headquarters in Hamburg. It offers a comprehensive listings of both radio and television programs. However, the magazine also features articles on finance, insurance, health, environment, travel and leisure.

== Circulation ==
The circulation of Funk Uhr was 1,674,092 copies between October and December 1994. In 2001 the weekly was one of the top television magazines worldwide with a circulation of 1,141,000 copies. It sold 907,000 copies in 2003. Its circulation decreased to 772,900 in 2006. During the fourth quarter of 2014 the circulation of the magazine was down to 453,550 copies. The magazine sold 315,914 copies between January and March 2020.

== See also ==
List of magazines in Germany
