= The New Age (film) =

- Theatrical release poster
- Directed by: Michael Tolkin
- Written by: Michael Tolkin
- Produced by: Keith Addis; Nick Wechsler
- Starring: Peter Weller; Judy Davis; Patrick Bauchau; Rachel Rosenthal; Adam West; Corbin Bernsen; Patricia Heaton; Samuel L. Jackson
- Cinematography: John J. Campbell
- Edited by: Suzanne Fenn
- Music by: Mark Mothersbaugh
- Production companies: Regency Enterprises; Alcor Films; Ixtlan
- Distributed by: Warner Bros.
- Release dates: September 13, 1994 (Toronto Film Festival); September 16, 1994
- Running time: 112 minutes
- Language: English
- Box office: $245,217

The New Age is a 1994 comedy-drama film written and directed by Michael Tolkin, and starring Peter Weller and Judy Davis.

== Plot ==
Peter and Katherine Witner are Southern California super-yuppies with great jobs but no center to their lives. When they both lose their jobs and begin marital infidelities, their solution is to start their own business together. In order to find meaning to their empty lives, they follow various New Age gurus and other such groups. Eventually, they hit rock bottom and have to make some hard decisions.

== Cast ==
- Peter Weller as Peter Witner
- Judy Davis as Katherine Witner
- Patrick Bauchau as Jean Levy
- Rachel Rosenthal as Sarah Friedberg
- Adam West as Jeff Witner
- Paula Marshall as Alison Gale
- Bruce Ramsay as Misha
- Tanya Pohlkotte as Bettina
- Susan Traylor as Ellen Saltonstall
- Patricia Heaton as Anna
- John Diehl as Lyle
- Maureen Mueller as Laura
- Sandra Seacat as Mary Netter
- Samuel L. Jackson as Dale Deveaux
- Audra Lindley as Sandi Rego
- Corbin Bernsen as Kevin Bulasky
- Jonathan Hadary as Paul Hartmann
- Lily Mariye as Sue
- Kimberley Kates as Other Catherine
- Maria Ellingsen as Hilly
- Kelly Miracco as Carol (credited as Kelly Miller)
- Dana Hollowell as Emily
- Rebecca Staab as Woman Customer
- Mary Kane as Tina Bulasky
- Patrick Dollaghan as Chet
- Jeff Celentano as Tab (credited as Jeff Weston)
- Victoria Baker as Victoria
- Bob Flanagan as Himself
- Nicole Nagel as Rich German
- Dana Kaminski as Andrea

== Release ==
The film opened on September 16, 1994, in New York (Village East Cinema and Sony Tower East) and Los Angeles, and grossed $35,797 for the weekend. It expanded to 12 screens and grossed a total of $245,217.

== Reception ==
On the review aggregator website Rotten Tomatoes, 67% of 15 critics' reviews are positive, with an average rating of 6.3/10. Metacritic, which uses a weighted average, assigned the film a score of 61 out of 100, based on 15 critics, indicating "generally favorable" reviews. Roger Ebert of the Chicago Sun-Times gave it three and a half out of four stars.

== Year-end lists ==
- 5th – Peter Rainer, Los Angeles Times
- 9th – Roger Ebert, Chicago Sun-Times
- Honorable mention – Jeff Simon, The Buffalo News
