= TV Spielfilm =

German television programme guide

- Chief Editor: Lutz Carstens
- Categories: German TV program guide
- Frequency: Biweekly
- Circulation: 753,423 (2018)
- Publisher: Hubert Burda Media
- First issue: 22 August 1990; 34 years ago
- Based in: Hamburg, Germany
- Language: German
- Website: www.tvspielfilm.de

TV Spielfilm is a biweekly German programme guide which has been published regularly since 1990. The focus is on the presentation of feature films in the programme. Until 2005, the publishing group Verlagsgruppe Milchstrasse was the publisher of the magazine until it was taken over by Hubert Burda Media.

== Development ==
The initial retail price was 3.80 Deutsche Mark, the first print run was 200,000 copies. Initially, the magazine was published monthly, the circulation was almost sold out from the beginning until the publisher increased the print run to 350,000.

Five months later, surprised by the success of the magazine, the publishing house changed the publication frequency to biweekly and started it on 1 February 1991 with a circulation of 1.2 million copies, initially at a "trial price" of 90 Pfennig. The regular price was 2.50 Deutsche Mark per issue. At the end of 2007, the price was increased from 1.45 to 1.50 euros.

With issue number 19/1991, the 1.015 million copies sold for the first time exceeded the one million mark at the regular sales price. Thus TV Spielfilm was the first successful new introduction in this magazine segment since 1983 (Auf einen Blick, die zwei, Bildwoche).

The circulation increased almost continuously until 1996; according to the IVW circulation list, the highest paid circulation was 2.763 million copies in the second quarter. Since 1998 there has been an initially slow but steady decline, with an average of around 1.5 million copies sold in 2007. In 2008, sales remained at an average of 1.46 million, the number of subscribers was just under 630,000 (2007: 640,000).

== Target group ==
At the beginning, the target group was a young readership with a "slightly male focus"; at the time of its monthly publication, the paper was conceived as a "second edition of the programme", as it did not yet contain a complete programme section at that time. The magazine was mainly bought by readers who were unfamiliar with established magazines such as Hörzu or TV Hören und Sehen. They then tried to establish a new type of magazine by switching to a biweekly publication method, which eventually succeeded.

== Market response ==
Since the concept of the sheet-makers worked ("Sprengmeister der etablierten Ordnung") and the success could no longer be overlooked, Bauer Verlag reacted and released its own feature film title TV Movie in December 1991, which copied the concept of TV Spielfilm and thus triggered a charge of plagiarism.

The evaluation of feature films by symbols ("high", "cross" and "deep thumbs"), which was carried out for the first time in TV Spielfilm, has been adopted by almost all TV guides in a modified form (stars, points) over the course of time; even in free supplements, ratings now appear in some cases. In the same way, the timeline, in which simultaneous program parts are almost eroded in a horizontal line, became a model for established journals as well as for journals that later appeared. The biweekly publication became the model for later magazines such as tv14, which was the best-selling TV guide on the market in 2007.

== Online ==
=== Website ===
TV Spielfilm operates an extensive internet portal tvspielfilm.de with information on many TV and cinema films and a complete TV programme even for exotic pay TV programmes and Dutch TV channels. The user can also find the daily tips here.

After a free registration the user can adapt this offer by selecting his own favourite stations and dividing them into groups of five. The linear day program can then be displayed next to each other for the stations in a group. When searching, which can also search for programme formats and feature film genres, registered users can also restrict the channels searched to their favourite stations. Registered users can reserve shipments and be notified by e-mail a few hours before the broadcast. Users are also notified if a film marked in the film archive appears on television in five days.

=== Apps ===
TV Spielfilm offers mobile apps for Android, iOS and Windows Phone, which include the complete TV program as well as daily tips in various categories. The applications have a notification function for TV programs and a customizable channel list. Since the settings are tied to the phone, there is no registration. On the iPad, there are different views for the program, while on the other devices all programs are always sorted by time and, if necessary, by position of the station in the personal channel list. The free apps are financed by advertising.

== TV Spielfim XXL ==
TV Spielfilm XXL is an extended version of the program guide, which appears simultaneously with the standard version, but includes more programs. In addition to conventional Free TV, the digital programme bouquets of Sky Deutschland, Vodafone Deutschland, Kabelkiosk, Telekom Entertain are also published. A total of more than 100 programs are listed. For the Free TV channels, however, fewer feature film ratings are included than in the normal TV Spielfim.

== TV Spielfilm live ==
TV Spielfilm live is the streaming media service of TV Spielfilm which was launched in July 2015. The service can optionally be used completely free of charge with access to 50 TV channels, but in SD quality and with advertising. The access to more than 70 TV channels in HD quality and without advertising cost 9,99 Euro per month. The offer is similar to the service of Zattoo, Magine TV or Waipu.tv.

== Sponsorship ==
TV Spielfilm has sponsored the German football club Hamburger SV between 2000 and 2003.
