= Freizeit Revue =

Weekly German women's magazine

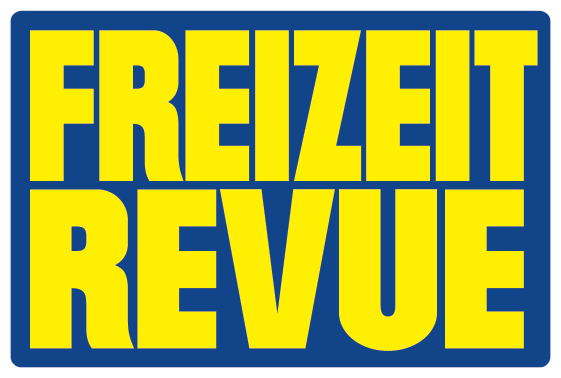
- Categories: Women's magazine
- Frequency: Weekly
- Publisher: Burda Senator Verlag GMBH
- Founded: 1970; 55 years ago
- Company: Hubert Burda Media
- Country: Germany
- Based in: Offenburg
- Language: German
- Website: Freizeit Revue
- ISSN: 0941-410X
- OCLC: 224618549

Freizeit Revue (German: Free Time Review) is a German language weekly entertainment and women's magazine published in Offenburg, Germany. It has been in circulation since 1970.

== History and profile ==
Freizeit Revue was established in 1970. The magazine is part of Hubert Burda Media. Burda Senator Verlag GMBH, a subsidiary of the company, publishes the magazine on a weekly basis on Thursdays.

The headquarters of Freizeit Revue is in Offenburg. Although men also read the magazine, its major reader group is women over 40. The magazine offers interviews with celebrities and articles about health, travel and fashion, among the others. In the early 1990s Freizeit Revue along with Bunte and Neue Post published the photographs of Princess Caroline, spouse of Prince Ernst August von Hannover, which were taken in Paris leading to an unsuccessful legal action by Princess Caroline.

During the fourth quarter of 2000 Freizeit Revue had a circulation of 1,060,297 copies, making it the third best-selling German women's magazine. In 2001 it was the sixteenth best-selling women's magazine worldwide with a circulation of 1,060,000 copies. Its average circulation was 1,028,000 copies in 2003. In the fourth quarter of 2006 its circulation was 1,009,800 copies. The total circulation of the magazine was 1,046,000 copies for 2006. The weekly had a circulation of 1,011,197 copies in 2010, making it the second best-selling weekly women magazine after Bild der Frau in Europe.

== See also ==
- List of magazines in Germany
