= Pirsch =

Pirsch is a surname. Notable people with this surname include:

- Carol McBride Pirsch (born 1936), American politician from Nebraska
- Joachim Pirsch (1914–1988), German rower
- Pete Pirsch (born 1969), American politician from Nebraska (son of Carol McBride Pirsch)
- Peter Pirsch (1866–1954), American manufacturer

== See also ==
- Peter Pirsch and Sons, company founded by Peter Pirsch
