= Schnitt =

Schnitt may refer to:

- Adolf Schnitt (1858–1924), Finnish sports shooter
- Corinna Schnitt (born 1964), German filmmaker and artist
- Todd Schnitt (born 1966), American talk radio host
- Schnitt, a German language film magazine
