= European Coatings Journal =

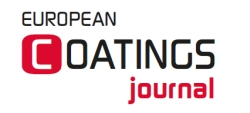
- Editor: Dr. Sonja Schulte
- Categories: Trade magazine
- Frequency: Monthly
- Publisher: Jürgen Nowak
- Founded: 1986; 40 years ago
- Company: Vincentz Network
- Country: Germany
- Based in: Hannover
- Language: English
- Website: ECJ
- ISSN: 0930-3847

The European Coatings Journal is an English-language trade magazine for the coatings industry. It is published by Vincentz Network. It was established in 1986. According to the Informationsgemeinschaft zur Feststellung der Verbreitung von Werbeträgern, it reached about 29.000 readers per issue in 2015. The European Coatings Journal is an official partner of the Conseil Européen de l'Industrie des Peintures, des Encres d'Imprimerie et des Couleurs d'Arts, the European coatings association.

== Content ==
The European Coatings Journal publishes articles on research and development, coatings production, and raw materials. Each issue typically focuses on a main topic, such as powder coatings, additives, or water-based coatings. Articles are contributed by external professionals and reviewed by the editorial team.

In addition to professional articles, the journal includes sections covering market trends and industry news, association activities, technical developments, events and trade shows, and new products and equipment. The journal also publishes preliminary reports on specific fairs and congresses, as well as market studies of key segments within the European coatings industry.

The journal occasionally publishes market studies of key segments within the European coatings industry. Special issues, such as the EC Directory, provide company profiles and overviews of organizations and institutes relevant to the coatings sector.

== See also ==
- List of magazines in Germany
