= Brigitte (magazine) =

Biweekly German women's magazine

- Editor: Brigitte Huber
- Categories: Women's magazine
- Frequency: Biweekly
- Founded: 1886; 140 years ago
- Company: Gruner + Jahr
- Country: Germany
- Based in: Hamburg
- Language: German
- Website: www.brigitte.de

Brigitte is a biweekly women's magazine in Germany which has been in circulation since 1886.

== History and profile ==
The magazine was first published in 1886 under the name Das Blatt der Hausfrau (German: Housewife’s Journal). Its target audience was the middle-class bourgeois housewife and the magazine often covered articles about child-rearing and foods. During World War II it stopped publication.

The magazine was relaunched in 1949 and was renamed as Brigitte in 1954. Brigitte merged with another women's magazine Constanze in 1969.

Brigitte is published every two weeks by Gruner + Jahr. Its headquarters is in Hamburg. The magazine launched its website in April 1997. The target audience of the magazine is both housewives and working women.

Andreas Lebert and Brigitte Huber served as co-editors of Brigitte. Lebert, after serving in the post from 2002 to 2012, left the magazine to become editor-in-chief of Zeit Wissen magazine.

In 2010 the magazine began to employ women who were not professional models.

== Circulation ==
Brigitte had a circulation of 150,000 copies in 1926. It was 940,700 copies in 1999. During the fourth quarter of 2000 its circulation rose to 958,258 copies. In 2001 it was one of top 50 women's magazine worldwide with a circulation of 958,000 copies. In 2004 the magazine had a circulation of 771,281 copies. Its circulation was 693,248 copies in 2010. Brigitte was the best-selling women's magazine in the first quarter of 2018 with a circulation of 389,279 copies.

== See also ==
- List of magazines in Germany

== Literature ==
- Dora Horvath. (2000). Bitte recht weiblich! Frauenleitbilder in der deutschen Zeitschrift Brigitte 1949-1982. Chronos Verlag, Zurich.
- Sylvia Lott-Almstadt. (1986). Brigitte 1886-1986, Chronik einer Frauenzeitschrift. Gruner + Jahr AG & Co, Hamburg. ISBN 3-570-04930-2
