= Transfermarkt =

German-based association football website

- Available in: List: Dutch; English; French; German; Greek; Indonesian; Italian; Japanese; Korean; Polish; Portuguese; Romanian; Spanish; Turkish
- Headquarters: Hamburg, Germany
- Country of origin: Germany
- Owners: Matthias Seidel; Axel Springer SE e-quadrat
- Creator: Matthias Seidel
- Founder: Matthias Seidel
- CEO: Matthias Seidel
- Parent: Axel Springer SE
- Website: transfermarkt.de (in German); transfermarkt.com (in English)
- Launched: May 2000; 26 years ago
- Current status: Active

Transfermarkt is a German-based website owned by Axel Springer SE that has footballing information, such as scores, results, statistics, transfer news, and fixtures. According to the IVW, it is in the top 25 most visited German websites, and one of the largest sport websites after kicker.de.

The website has scores, results, transfer news, fixtures, and player values. Despite the player values, along with some other facts, being estimates, researchers from the Centre for Economic Performance have found that the "rumours" of player transfers are largely accurate.

These estimated player values are usually updated every few months, considering the high inflation and fluctuation of the association football market, these estimates might be slightly lower or higher than what a players' current form and therefore current value might suggest.

== History ==
The website was founded in May 2000, by Matthias Seidel to track players and transfer targets for SV Werder Bremen before expanding to other teams. The database covering players, coaches and competitions was introduced in September 2001. It was built and maintained by the site's online community. The Website combines professional/editorial work with community contributions, rather than presenting it simply as a conventional statistics provider. Transfermarkt says its market values incorporate discussion among members of its community. Its historical database was also built and expanded by the online community. It does not use an algorithm to calculate its market values. Instead, it relies on the knowledge of its community and considers factors including transfer fees, salaries, the player's situation, age, contract situation, and the market context. In 2008, Axel Springer publishing house acquired a 51% share in the website. Seidel kept the other 49% of the shares. The English-language version started in 2009.

In 2010, IVW ranked it among the 25 most visited German websites, and one of the biggest sports sites after Kicker.

On 19 May 2014, a relaunch took place for the so-called update to 'version 4'. In the course of this update there were both server-technical as well as data-legal issues, as private data was visible to other users for an indefinite period of time. For 48 hours the site had only a very limited availability, resulting in multiple complaints on Facebook. The biggest criticisms from users was the confusing new design. As a result, Transfermarkt.de publicly apologized for the incidents and issues that were caused during the relaunch.

As of 2021, the website has 39 million unique monthly visitors and 680,000 registered users.
