= LV 1871 =

German life Insurance company

Lebensversicherung von 1871 a. G. München
- Company type: Mutual insurance
- Industry: Primary insurers
- Founded: 1871
- Headquarters: Munich, Germany
- Key people: Board: Wolfgang Reichel (Chairman of the Board); Klaus Math; Chairman of the Supervisory Board: Christoph Hamm
- Products: Insurance
- Website: www.lv1871.de

The Lebensversicherung von 1871 a. G. München (LV 1871) is a German life insurance company founded in 1871 and headquartered in Munich. LV 1871 specializes in life, pension and disability insurance.

== General information ==
The LV 1871 company group is managed by: CEO Wolfgang Reichel and Klaus Math, responsible for products, underwriting and IT, as well as sales and marketing. The chairman of the supervisory board is Christoph Hamm.

The following subsidiaries are wholly owned by the parent company Lebensversicherung von 1871 a.G. München:

- Delta Direkt Lebensversicherung AG Munich, Munich
- LV 1871 Pensionsfonds AG, Triesen (Liechtenstein), founded in 2007
- LV 1871 Private Assurance AG, Triesen (Liechtenstein), established in 2008
- Magnus GmbH, Munich, Germany
- TRIAS Versicherung AG, Munich, Germany

== Company history ==
- In 1871, the "Christkatholischer Begräbniß-Verein" (Catholic Funeral Association) was founded by a group of Munich citizens, offering funeral insurance to its members.
- By 1927, the number of members had risen to 140,000. In that same year, the institution was converted into a mutual insurance association.
- In 1929, the association began offering life insurance.
- By 1933, the number of members had risen to 400,000. In 1938 the association was forced by the rulers of the Third Reich to rename itself as "Münchener Begräbnisverein" (Munich Funeral Association).
- In July 1945, two months after the end of World War II, the association resumed business operations at Sendlinger Strasse 55 in Munich.
- In 1954 the association had a portfolio of 1.1 million insurance contracts.
- In 1969, the company renamed itself to "Lebensversicherung von 1871 a.G. München" to reflect the growing share of life insurance policies in its portfolio.
- In 1977, the company moved its headquarters to Regina-Haus at Maximiliansplatz 5 (formerly the Regina Palace Hotel).
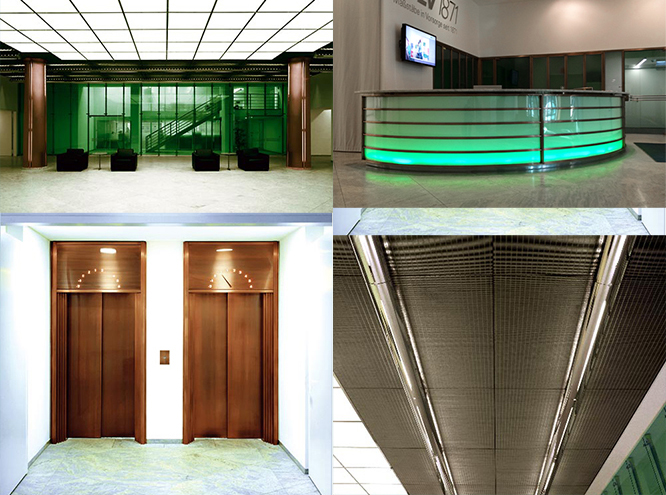
  Reception hall and conference areas in Regina Haus, redesigned by Gert M. Weber (1998)
- In 1987, the company chose a new logo, a stylized version of the "Frauenkirche" (Cathedral of Our Dear Lady) representing its founding home, the city of Munich.
- In 1993, shortly before the completion of the European Single Market, LV 1871 launched new products such as supplementary long-term care insurance as part of an overall pension plan, disability insurance for the self-employed including a premium reimbursement guarantee, and critical illness insurance policies with capital advance in the case of serious illnesses.
- In 1999, LV 1871 launched "eXtra-Rente" pension insurance, which was awarded the Capital Innovation Prize for insurance.
- In January 2013, the trade journals Euro and Euro am Sonntag awarded the Golden Bull for the company's "4flex" product. Customers can choose between a classic retirement or a lump-sum payment, as well as between "eXtraRenten" (supplementary retirement income) or a long-term care insurance plan. In the event of a serious illness or the need for long-term care, the pension is flexibly adjusted.
