= Euro am Sonntag =

German business and finance magazine

- Categories: Business magazine
- Frequency: Weekly
- Publisher: Finanzen Verlag
- Founded: 1998; 27 years ago
- Company: Finanzen Verlag
- Country: Germany
- Based in: Munich
- Language: German
- Website: Euro am Sonntag
- ISSN: 1439-9717
- OCLC: 803989959

Euro am Sonntag is a weekly business and finance magazine published in Munich, Germany. It has been in circulation since 1998.

== History and profile ==
Euro am Sonntag was started by Axel Springer SE in 1998. The company owned the magazine until May 2010 when it was sold to Frank B. Werner and a Swiss investment company, Finanzen Verlag. The publisher is also the Finanzen Verlag. The previous publisher of the magazine is the Axel Springer Financial Media, a subsidiary of Axel Springer SE.

Euro am Sonntag is published every week and is based in Munich. The weekly provides in-depth analyses of financial developments in Germany and other countries, and offers independent and sustainable information related to a successful investment strategy.

== Circulation ==
In 2001 Euro am Sonntag sold 192,000 copies, and its readership was 420,000. For the first quarter of 2005 the circulation of the magazine was 113,189 copies, making it the fourth best-selling weekly business publication in Germany. In 2010 the magazine sold 144,456 copies. In the first half of 2011 its circulation was 76,526 copies. The magazine had a circulation of 70,332 copies in the fourth quarter 2016.

== See also ==
List of magazines in Germany
