= Aero International =

- Editor-in-chief: Thomas Borchert
- Frequency: Monthly
- Publisher: Jahr Top Special Verlag GmbH & Co
- Founded: 1993; 33 years ago
- Country: Germany
- Based in: Hamburg
- Language: German
- Website: www.aerointernational.de
- ISSN: 0946-0802

Aero International is a German monthly magazine devoted to civil aviation. The magazine is based in Hamburg, Germany.

== History ==
Aero International was established in 1993. Its headquarters is in Hamburg and its owner and publisher is Jahr Top Special Verlag. The company acquired the title in 1993 when it was part of Axel Springer Verlags AG.

The magazine was established by the Austrian painter and graphic designer Mario Arbesser and Kwirt Dragan Jukic. The founding publishing house was the AJV Publishing House in Munich, Germany.

== Content ==
The magazine focuses on business aviation, airlines, airports, airliners and helicopters. It annually publishes a list of the world's safest airlines.

The editor-in-chief from 1997 to 2015 was Dietmar Plath. In that year, Thomas Borchert took over that role.

== See also ==
- List of German magazines
