= Bild der Frau =

Weekly women's magazine in Germany

- Logo
- Editor-in-chief: Sandra Immoor
- Categories: Women's magazine
- Frequency: Weekly
- Circulation: 380,000 (2024)
- First issue: 1 March 1983; 43 years ago
- Company: Funke Mediengruppe
- Country: Germany
- Based in: Hamburg
- Language: German
- Website: Bild der Frau
- ISSN: 0949-6874

Bild der Frau (German: Picture of Woman) is a weekly women's magazine published in Hamburg, Germany, that has been in circulation since 1983.

== History and profile ==
Bild der Frau was established in March 1983. The headquarters of the weekly is in Hamburg. The magazine was part of the Axel Springer Group and was published by Axel Springer SE on a weekly basis. In July 2013 the Axel Springer Group sold it and many other publications to Funke Mediengruppe.

Bild der Frau is a full-color tabloid magazine which features articles related to women. As of 2015 Sandra Immoor was the editor-in-chief of the magazine of which the website was started in 2001.

== Circulation ==
In 1987 Bild der Frau sold 2.5 million copies. During the third quarter of 1992 the magazine had a circulation of 2,094,000 copies. The circulation of the weekly was up to 2,108,309 copies between October and December 1994. In 1999 its circulation was down to 1,977,300 copies.

During the fourth quarter of 2000 the circulation of the weekly was down to 1,662,502 copies. In 2001 it was the eleventh best-selling women's magazine worldwide with a circulation of 1,663,000 copies. The magazine had an average circulation of 1,186,000 copies in 2003. In the fourth quarter of 2006 its circulation was 1,083,300 copies. It rose to 1,478,000 copies for 2006 as a whole.

Bild der Frau sold 1,085,258 copies during the second quarter of 2007. The magazine had a circulation of 1,021,098 copies in 2009, making it the best-selling weekly women magazine in Europe. In 2012 the circulation of the magazine was down to 897,600 copies. During the second quarter of 2016 the magazine had a circulation of 777,050 copies, making it the best-selling women's magazine in the country.

== See also ==
- List of magazines in Germany
