= Kultur im Heim =

East German lifestyle magazine (1956–1989)

- June 1978 cover
- Categories: Lifestyle magazine; Women's magazine
- Publisher: Verlag die Wirtschaft
- Founded: 1956
- Final issue: 1989
- Country: German Democratic Republic
- Based in: East Berlin
- Language: German
- ISSN: 0323-4967
- OCLC: 9366612

Kultur im Heim (German: Culture at Home) was an East German women's magazine specializing on home decoration and home design. The magazine was published between 1956 and 1989.

== History and profile ==
Kultur im Heim was started in 1956. It was first appeared as a supplement to an interior design magazine Möbel und Wohnraum, but then became an independent publication. Its foundation was an indicator of the change in the East Germany's cultural policy. Because in the early days of the state housing architecture and city planning were emphasized as the preferred sites of socialist cultural identity. However, from the mid-1950s its cultural policy became focused on commodities and domestic spaces.

Kultur im Heim was published by Verlag die Wirtschaft in East Berlin. Target audience of the magazine was women. The magazine functioned as a mediator between the professional design community and East German consumers.

Kultur im Heim provided its readers with several suggestions about home design and leisure activities. It advised them to prefer a simple and functional design at their home. The magazine also featured articles on the new designs of the East German furniture industry and on the modern and functional prefabricated furniture. All articles published in the magazine were based on the findings of the studies by social scientists, philosophers and designers about the relationship between socialism, aesthetics and taste.

The magazine folded in 1989.

== See also ==
- List of magazines in Germany
