= 1000° =

- A 1997 cover
- Categories: Techno music
- Circulation: 26,000
- First issue: August 1995
- Final issue: 2005
- Country: Germany
- Based in: Leipzig
- Language: German

1000° was a German electronic dance music magazine and web portal. It was first published in August 1995. With a circulation of about 26,000 copies it quickly became the most influential techno club guide in Eastern Germany.

== History ==
The magazine was first published in August 1995, and its print editions appeared until 2001. It began online portal functions as "Der Clubguide" in 1996, lasting until 2005.

== Main contributors ==
The main contributors were André Quaas, Udo Israel, Mark Busse, Mario Adolphson, and Sabrina Walte.

== See also ==
- List of German magazines
