= ABC-Zeitung =

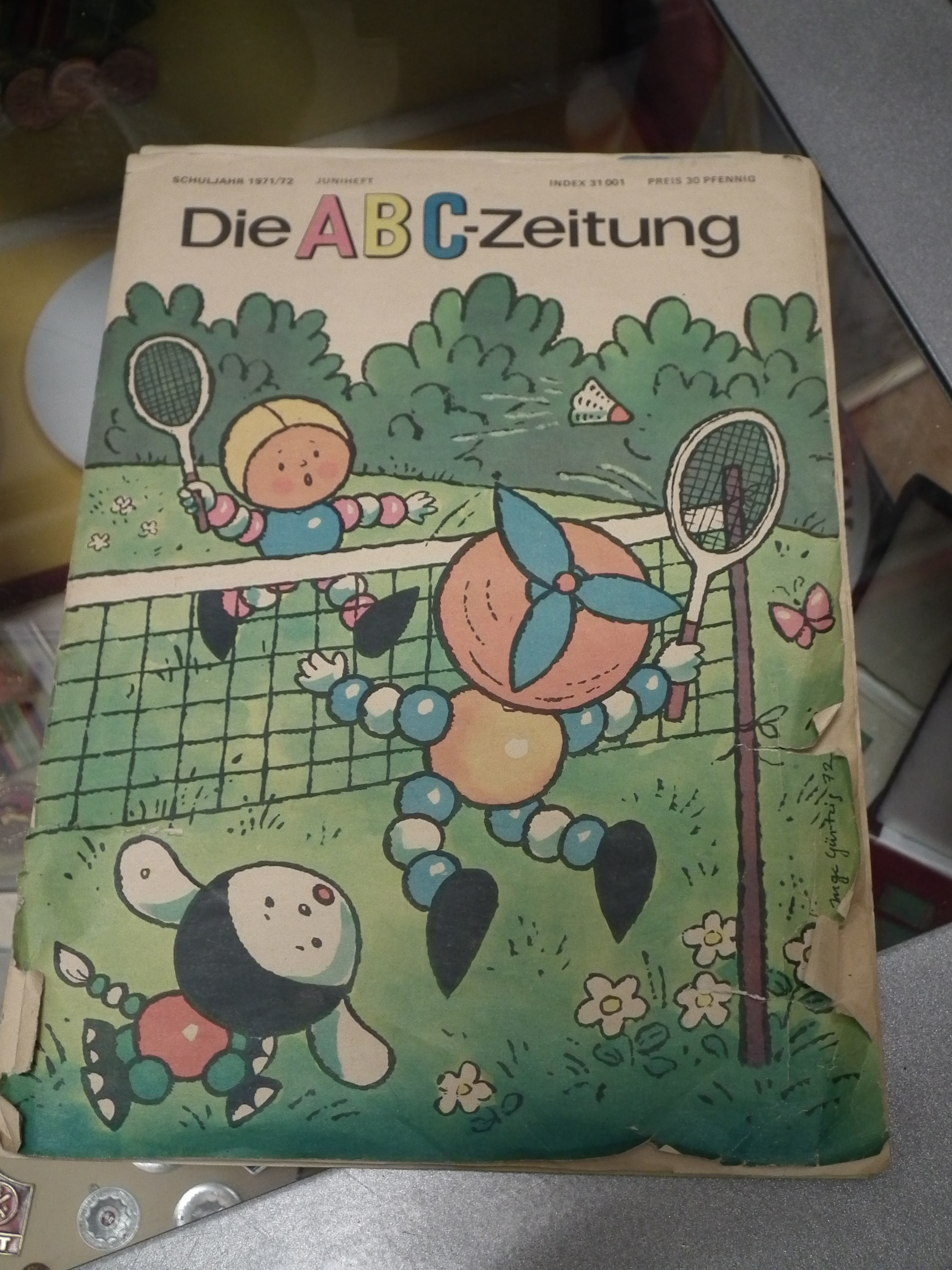
- Categories: Children's magazine
- Frequency: Monthly
- Publisher: Volk und Wissen (1946–1950); Verlag Junge Welt (1950–1990); Verlags-Union Pabel-Moewig (1990–1996)
- First issue: 1946
- Final issue: 1996
- Country: East Germany; Germany
- Language: German

ABC-Zeitung was a German monthly children's magazine published between 1946 and 1996.

== History and profile ==
Founded in 1946, ABC-Zeitung was the first children's magazine of East Germany, and at one time it had a circulation of 885,000 copies.

Published by Volk und Wissen until 1950, and then by Verlag Junge Welt, the magazine was the voice of the Free German Youth, targeting Young Pioneers and school-age children aged six to eleven. It was issued at a price of 30 Pfennig in schools or at kiosks. The magazine was also read by children as part of their school work.

In 1958 ABC-Zeitung became the official media outlet of Young Pioneers. Following it the magazine covered articles to entertain children as well as to teach them about nature, customs and children in other countries. It was also an antifascist propaganda tool for children.

After the fall of the German Democratic Republic, the magazine continued to be issued until 1996 by Verlags-Union Pabel-Moewig of Rastatt.

== See also ==
- List of German magazines
