= Neue Post =

German news and women's magazine

- Neuepost logo
- Categories: Entertainment magazine; News magazine; Women's magazine
- Frequency: Weekly
- Publisher: Bauer Verlag
- First issue: 1948
- Company: Bauer Group
- Country: Germany
- Based in: Hamburg
- Language: German
- Website: Neue Post
- OCLC: 647804353

Neue Post is a German-language weekly entertainment news magazine published in Hamburg, Germany. It has been in circulation since 1948.

== History and profile ==
Neue Post was established in 1948. The magazine is part of the Bauer Group and is published by Bauer Verlag on a weekly basis. The company acquired Neue Post in 1961 when it bought the publisher of the magazine, Kurt Möller Verlag. The headquarters of the weekly is in Hamburg.

Neue Post is a pulp magazine which is called rainbow press in Germany. The target audience of the magazine is older women. The magazine provides news on celebrities and public figures and includes articles on leisure, fashion and health-related advice.

In the early 1990s Neue Post along with Bunte and Freizeit Revue published the photographs of Princess Caroline, spouse of Prince Ernst August von Hannover, which were taken in Paris leading to an unsuccessful legal action by Princess Caroline.

== Circulation ==
During the third quarter of 1992 Neue Post sold 1,848,000 copies. The circulation of the magazine was down to 1,563,667 copies between October and December 1994.

During the fourth quarter of 2000 its circulation was down to 1,278,012 copies. In 2001 Neue Post was the thirteenth best-selling women's magazine worldwide with a circulation of 1,278,000 copies. The magazine had an average circulation of 994,000 copies in 2003. In the fourth quarter of 2006 its circulation was down to 881,100 copies. The circulation of the magazine was down to 738,370 copies in 2010.

== See also ==
List of magazines in Germany
