= ADAC Motorwelt =

Automobile and travel magazine in Germany

- Editor-in-chief: Martin Kunz
- Categories: Automobile magazine; Travel magazine
- Frequency: Quarterly
- Publisher: BCN
- Founded: 1925; 101 years ago
- Company: ADAC
- Country: Germany
- Based in: Munich
- Language: German
- ISSN: 0007-2842

ADAC Motorwelt (German: ADAC Motoring) is an automobile and travel magazine published in Munich, Germany. It is a member-magazine of ADAC (Allgemeiner Deutscher Automobil-Club e.V.) and due to 21,4 millions ADAC-members it was over decades one of the magazines in Germany with the highest circulation.

== History and profile ==
ADAC Motorwelt was established in 1925 as a monthly magazine of ADAC. The magazine and ADAC Sport are the successors of another car magazine, Der Motorfahrer, which was published for 22 years until 1925. ADAC Motorwelt is the official media outlet of ADAC. Its publisher is ADAC Verlag. The magazine was published monthly. Like ADAC, ADAC Motorwelt has its headquarters in Munich.

ADAC Motorwelt covers articles mainly on cars and travel-related topics. The magazine features also news about road tests, motor sports and new model previews. It publishes several lists and provides awards, including "Germany’s favourite car", based on reader votes. In January 2014 Michael Ramstetter, editor of the magazine, resigned from the post due to alleged vote manipulation in relation to the award of "Germany’s favourite car" for 2013.

Since 2020, the ADAC has had a magazine produced and marketed as a commission from the media group Burda. From 2020 on ADAC Motorwelt is published quarterly. Officially ADAC is still publisher, and former editor-in-chief Martin Kunz continues to oversee the content. At the same time, ADAC enhances and expands its digital communication channels, and its postal delivery to members' households was stopped.

ADAC Motorwelt is available at the ADAC local offices, travel agencies and driver safety locations as well as the Edeka and Netto supermarkets. All members need to do to get a copy of the magazine is show their membership card.

== Circulation ==
In 1992 ADAC Motorwelt had a circulation of 10.9 million copies. It was the top special interest magazine worldwide in 2001 with a circulation of 13,162,000 copies. The magazine had an average circulation of 13,777,000 copies in 2003, making it the largest magazine in Germany. It was again the largest magazine in the country with a circulation of 13,616,000 copies in 2005. During the fourth quarter of 2006 its circulation was 13,849,000 copies. Its total circulation was 13,700,000 copies in 2006, making it the largest magazine in Germany.

The circulation of ADAC Motorwelt was 13,808,111 copies in 2010, making it the largest European automobile magazine.

== See also ==
- List of magazines in Germany
