= Damals =

Monthly history magazine in Germany

- Cover of issue No. 2/2015, announcing a feature on Oliver Cromwell and the Commonwealth of England
- Editor-in-Chief: Stefan Bergmann
- Categories: History
- Frequency: Monthly
- Circulation: 23,000
- Publisher: Katja Kohlhammer
- Founded: 1969
- Company: Konradin Medien
- Country: Germany
- Based in: Leinfelden-Echterdingen
- Language: German
- Website: damals.de
- ISSN: 0011-5908

Damals is a German monthly popular scientific history magazine. The magazine has been issued since 1969, and aims primarily at students, teachers, university students, scientists and a readership interested in historical science. The German word damals means 'at that time'.

The editors, being established historians, archaeologists, cultural scientists and philologists, write scientifically-based articles. Each month another focus theme is portrayed. This concept distinguishes Damals from other German publications of the kind, for example G/Geschichte. The magazine also features brief book reviews, a historically-oriented television and radio programme, research news and articles on topics with a wide range of historical eras and themes. Moreover, it covers current exhibitions which are often featured in whole articles or even as theme of the month.

The magazine, whose scientific advisory body includes historians Christian Meier and Jürgen Osterhammel, is published by Konradin Medien GmbH of Leinfelden-Echterdingen. Katja Kohlhammer, the publishing group's executive director, is the publisher.

Abstracts of current issues, yearly tables of content and an articles archive can be viewed online. During the period of 2010-2013 Damals had a lower circulation level than other comparable history periodicals in Germany. In the third quarter of 2015, Damals sold 23,104 copies.

== See also ==
- List of magazines in Germany
