= Der Aktionär =

Business magazine in Germany

- Categories: Business magazine
- Frequency: Weekly
- Publisher: Börsenmedien AG
- Founder: Bernd Förtsch
- Founded: 1996
- Country: Germany
- Based in: Kulmbach
- Language: German
- Website: Der Aktionär
- ISSN: 1432-4911
- OCLC: 164737981

Der Aktionär (German: The Shareholder) is a German language weekly business and finance magazine published in Germany. The headquarters of the magazine is in Kulmbach.

== History and profile ==
Der Aktionär was started in late 1996 as a successor to a business magazine entitled Bulle & Bär. Bernd Förtsch is its founder who also served as its editor-in-chief. The magazine is published by the Börsenmedien AG owned by Förtsch. It was published monthly until 2000 when its frequency was switched to weekly.

Der Aktionär focuses on news about stock market. Olaf Hordenbach served as the editor-in-chief of the magazine.

In the first quarter of 2000 Der Aktionär sold 140,000 copies. In June 2000 the magazine reached a peak circulation figure with 200,000 copies. For the first quarter of 2005 the circulation of the magazine was 33,963 copies, making it the fifth best-selling weekly business publication in Germany. The circulation of the magazine was 29,536 copies in the first half of 2011.

== See also ==
List of magazines in Germany
