= Nicole Nagel =

German-American model

- Born: Berlin, Germany
- Other name: Nicky Nagel
- Citizenship: German, American
- Education: Joanne Baron / DW Brown Studio Graduate / Howard Fine Acting Studio
- Occupations: Actress, model
- Years active: 1980–present
- Spouse: Pierre Caland
- Children: 1

Nicole Nagel is a German-American model, actress, photographer and writer.

== Early life ==
Nagel was born in Berlin, Germany and discovered as a teenager by German photographer Werner Bokelberg. She began modeling and working around the world and was on the cover of more than 40 magazines in Germany and Italy, becoming one of Germany's first supermodels. In 1989 Nagel appeared in the Pirelli Calendar photographed by Joyce Tennyson.

== Career ==
Nagel was represented by numerous modeling agencies from 1980 to 1989, including Parker-Sed, Ford Models and Click Model Management. She appeared on magazine covers in Germany and Italy and in fashion magazines including Vogue, Harper's Bazaar, Elle, Madamoiselle and Brides and worked with photographers including Bruce Weber, Patrick Demarchelier and Joyce Tennyson. Nagel appeared in campaigns for fashion brands including Calvin Klein [lensed by Bruce Weber], Pringle of Scotland and Triumph International as well as in advertisements for retailers including Macy's, Bloomingdales and Karstadt.

In 1992, Nagel moved to Los Angeles and started acting in American and German productions. She also appeared in commercials and music videos. She is most well known for her role in Alan Smithee's Burn Hollywood Burn and for her recurring roles as Hulda as Doug Ross' (George Clooney) love interest on the NBC television series ER and as Kate, Jack Richmond's (Judd Nelson) love interest on Suddenly Susan. She also appeared on the television series Married With Children and with Lorenzo Lamas in Air America in 1998.

Nagel continues to act in television and movies, recently in the German miniseries Schuld und Unschuld, alongside Heinz Hoenig and Letztes Kapitel alongside Simon Verhoeven.

Nagel's work as a photographer and writer has been published in global publications including Dein Spiegel and Art Investor.

== Personal life ==
In 1996 Nagel married Pierre Caland, a French-Lebanese businessman. They have a daughter, Olympia Nagel-Caland, born in 1999.

== Filmography ==
Title	Year	Role	Notes	Ref.
The Quincy Rose Show	2011	Bondage Woman		
Schuld und Unschuld (TV Movie)	2006	Hannelore Johs		
Cyxork 7	2006	Ute		
Letztes Kapitel (TV Movie)	2005	Rita Adranski		
Kristin	2001	Marinka		
Air America (TV Series)	1998	Eva		
Silk Stalkings (TV Series)	1998	Venus Olson		
Dinner and Driving	1997	Eva		
NightMan (TV Movie)	1997	Katrina Weston		
House of Frankenstein (TV Mini-Series)	1997	Vampire Bartender		
An Alan Smithee Film: Burn Hollywood Burn	1997	Aloe Vera		
NightMan (TV Series)	1997	Katrina Weston		
Suddenly Susan (TV Series)	1997	Kate		
Life with Roger (TV Series)	1997	Lisa		
Hudson Street (TV Series)	1996	Woman #2		
Nixon	1995	Kissinger's Date		
Can't Hurry Love (TV Series)	1995	Ruth		
ER (TV Series)	1995	Hulda		
French Exit	1995	Klexxie		
Unhappily Ever After (TV Series)	1995	Amazon Woman		
Pointman (TV Series)	1995	Arina		
The New Age	1994	Rich German		
Married with Children (TV Series)	1994	Heidi		
Basic Values: Sex, Shock & Censorship in the 90's (TV Movie)	1993	Visitor (uncredited)		
Wild Palms (TV Mini-Series)	1993	Drug Addict		
