= Abenteuer Archäologie =

- Editor: Reinhard Breuer
- Categories: Archaeology and science
- First issue: February 2004
- Final issue: 2012
- Country: Germany
- Based in: Heidelberg
- Language: German
- Website: www.abenteuer-archaeologie.de
- ISSN: 1612-9954

Abenteuer Archäologie (German: Adventure Archeology) was a German archaeological and science magazine. The magazine was founded in February 2004 and was published by Spektrum der Wissenschaft Verlagsgesellschaft mbH in Heidelberg. Its editor was Reinhard Breuer. The magazine was merged with Epoch magazine in 2012.

== See also ==
List of magazines in Germany
