= Landlust (magazine) =

Bimonthly German lifestyle magazine

- Landlust logo
- Categories: Women's magazine Lifestyle magazine Gardening magazine
- Frequency: Bimonthly
- Publisher: Landwirtschaftsverlag
- Founded: 2005; 21 years ago
- Country: Germany
- Based in: Münster
- Language: German
- Website: Landlust
- ISSN: 1863-8074

Landlust (literally Lust for the Land) is a German bimonthly gardening, home and women's magazine published in Münster, Germany. It is one of the best-selling magazines in the country.

== History and profile ==
Landlust was started in 2005. The magazine is published by Landwirtschaftsverlag, an agricultural publishing house, on a bimonthly basis. The headquarters of the magazine is in Münster. Although Landlust originally targeted farming households, later its primary readers became women aged 40–59. The magazine provides articles about several aspects of countryside life. The frequent topics covered in the magazine include cooking, crafting, gardening, knitting and nature, among others.

Landlust is considered to be a revival of the Heimat concept in Germany. Philip Oltermann of the Observer regarded the magazine as one of five objects defining modern Germany. However, several German media outlets criticized the magazine's lack of refinement. Der Spiegel, for example, said: "When rubbish is turned into a magazine, it calls itself Landlust."

Although Landlust has a website, it just covers limited service offerings and features an online shop.

In November 2015, the British edition of Landlust was launched.

== Circulation ==
Landlust had a circulation of 50,000 copies in its first year. In 2007 its circulation rose to 200,000 copies. In late 2009, the magazine sold nearly 550,000 copies. The circulation of the magazine was 648,866 copies in 2010.

In 2013, Landlust became one of the top ten German magazines in terms of readership and had a circulation of 1,041,069 copies in the third quarter of the same year. During the second quarter of 2014 the magazine sold 1,024,033 copies.

== See also ==
List of magazines in Germany
