= 5vor12 =

German magazine

- Frequency: Biannual
- Founded: 1993
- Country: Germany
- Language: German

5vor12 is a biannual German magazine distributed free to schools. In addition to advertisements for companies and institutions to present their vacancies, advice on application and interviews are included. The medium is supported by educational institutions in Germany.

== History ==
The idea for the concept came in 1993. Then it was first published the same year. There are now twelve regional editions nationwide in Germany, each of which appear in metropolitan areas in schools.

== See also ==
- List of magazines in Germany
