= Impulse (German magazine) =

Monthly business magazine in Germany

- Logo of Impulse
- Categories: Business magazine
- Frequency: Monthly
- Publisher: Impulse Medien GmbH
- Founder: Johannes Gross
- Founded: 1980; 45 years ago
- Company: Impulse Medien GmbH
- Country: Germany
- Based in: Hamburg
- Language: German
- Website: Impulse
- ISSN: 0720-9037

Impulse (formally Impulse: Das Unternehmer-Magazin) is one of the business magazines published in Germany. The magazine appears on a monthly basis in Hamburg.

== History and profile ==
Impulse was started in Cologne in 1980. The founder was Johannes Gross. The magazine was owned and published by Gruner + Jahr. In November 2012 the company announced that the magazine would be sold. In January 2013 the magazine was acquired by Impulse Medien GmbH of which majority stake is held by Nikolaus Förster. The publisher of the magazine, headquartered in Hamburg, is also Impulse Medien GmbH. The magazine is published monthly.

On 1 February 2006 Klaus Schweinsberg was appointed editor-in-chief of the magazine, which targets decision makers, management consultants, investors and entrepreneurs. In 2009 Nikolaus Förster was named the editor-in-chief of the magazine.

Before the unification of Germany Impulse had an East German edition, which was launched in 1990 and was published also monthly.

In 2001 the circulation of Impulse was 142,000 copies. The magazine sold 135,128 copies in the last quarter of 2004. The monthly had a circulation of 81,132 copies during the third quarter of 2012. It was 81,000 copies in the last quarter of the same year.

== See also ==
List of magazines in Germany
