= Tina (German magazine) =

German women's magazine

- Categories: Women's magazine
- Frequency: Weekly
- First issue: 1975
- Company: Bauer Media Group
- Country: Germany
- Based in: Hamburg
- Language: German
- Website: www.tina.de
- ISSN: 0939-8562

Tina was a German women's weekly magazine.

== History ==
The magazine was first published in 1975.

According to IVW, in February 2024 tina had a circulation of 211,435 copies and thus reached around 2.55 million readers.
