= Die Aktuelle =

German magazine

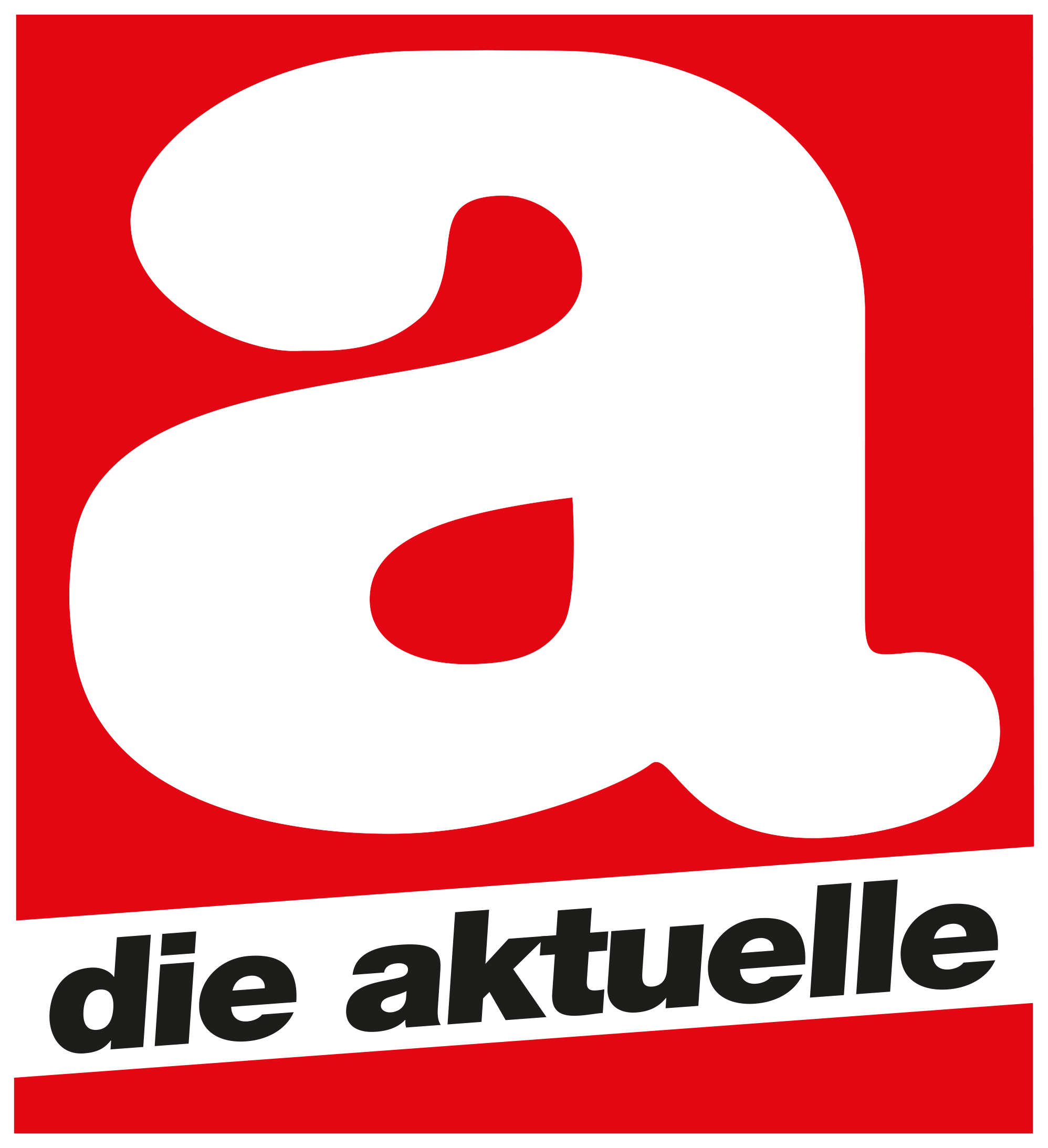
- Editor-in-Chief: Vacant
- Categories: Women's interest
- Frequency: Weekly
- Total circulation: 235,336 (2022)
- First issue: 1979
- Company: Funke Mediengruppe
- Country: Germany
- Based in: Essen
- Language: German
- Website: die-aktuelle.de
- ISSN: 0174-8017

Die Aktuelle (German for "The Actual") is a German language weekly women's magazine published in Essen, Germany.

== History and profile ==
Die Aktuelle has been published since 1979. The magazine is part of Funke Mediengruppe, and is published weekly by Gong Verlag. Its editorial office was formerly in Nuremberg and the magazine is now headquartered in Essen. In 2010, the circulation of Die Aktuelle was 388,275 copies. During the second quarter of 2016 it was down to 353,958 copies.

In 2009, Anne Hoffmann became its chief editor. In April 2023, the magazine published as its cover story a "deceptively real" interview with former racing driver Michael Schumacher, who had not spoken in public since a 2013 brain injury. The interview was a fake, generated by artificial intelligence. Hoffmann was fired for its publication and Schumacher's family said they would pursue legal action. In May 2024, it was reported that the magazine paid Schumacher €200,000 to settle the case.

== See also ==
- List of magazines in Germany
