= Martin Bossange =

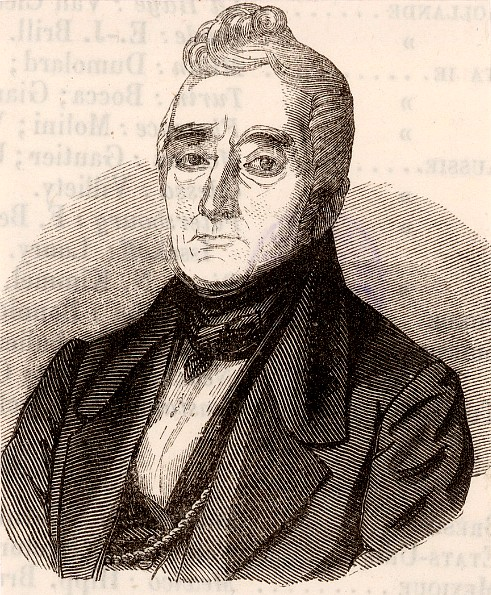
- Born: 2 February 1765; Bordeaux, France
- Died: 30 October 1865; Paris, France
- Occupation(s): Book dealer and publisher
- Children: Hector Bossange; Adolphe Bossange

Martin Bossange (2 February 1765 – 30 October 1865) was a book dealer, originally from Bordeaux, who relocated to Paris and created an international publishing business.

== Life ==
Martin Bossange arrived in Paris at the age of twenty, and set up in business as a book dealer in 1787. An early success came when he sold 50,000 copies of the 1789 drama Charles IX by Joseph Chénier. He developed a close working relationship with a dealer from Lyon called Joseph-René Masson, in 1792 entering into a formal partnership. This led, with the participation of a third partner, to the formation in 1798, of a company called Bossange, Masson et Besson.

The company quickly focused on the international book business, concentrating on selling French books overseas. Bossange opened a book dealership in Santo Domingo (then part of Haiti) in 1801, and then in 1814, despite the wartime trade blockade, a subsidiary in London. Further overseas branches followed, in Montreal and Mexico City (1815), Madrid, Naples and Rome (1820) and then, around 1830, Leipzig. The centre of the international network which emerged after the end of the war was at Great Marlborough Street in London, where Bossange collaborated with two associates named Barthès and Lowell to build up a major book dealing business. While he was based in London, between 1814 and 1820, the Paris head office was run by his son, Adolphe Bossange. After Martin Bossange returned to Paris, in 1826 his share in the London business was sold to Barthès and Lowell.

In 1818 or 1819 Martin Bossange ended the Masson partnership and sold the printing shop that produced the Journal de la librairie. He now concentrated on publication of new editions as well as deals involving older editions, and international book trades. In 1825 his business was located at "60 Rue de Richelieu" was using the name "galerie de Bossange père" ("Gallery of Bossange, father") in order to differentiate it from the business "Bossange frères" ("Bossange Brothers") which had been opened at "12 rue de Seine" some years earlier by his sons Hector and Adolphe Bossange. Martin Bossange's "salon" became known as a meeting place for writers and other literary figures. During Bossange's absences abroad Moritz Gottlieb Saphir, a Bavarian writer who had fled to Paris in 1829 following differences with the authorities in Munich, presided over a series of "literary evenings" here.

Following a succession of financial setbacks, Martin Bossange filed for bankruptcy in the Autumn of 1830. He nevertheless successfully continued to be active in publishing, far across the Rhine, in Leipzig, where he entered into a partnership with Johann Jacob Weber. Together they set up Das Pfennig-Magazin, one of the first magazine titles targeting a family readership, which appeared weekly between 1833 and 1847.

Martin Bossange retired in 1837 after selling his publishing interests in Germany to Heinrich Brockhaus. His sons, Hector and Adolphe, built up their own international book trading company, which was then continued by Hector's own sons, Gustave and Edmond, for most of the rest of the nineteenth century. Martin Bossange himself died in Paris in 1865.
