= Berlin Rom Tokio =

Nazi propaganda magazine

The German journal Berlin Rom Tokio: Monatsschrift für die Vertiefung der kulturellen Beziehungen der Völker des weltpolitischen Dreiecks (English: Berlin Rome Tokyo: Monthly Journal for the Deepening of Cultural Relations between the Peoples of the World-Political Triangle) was a periodical published during the National Socialist era in Berlin, where it was printed by Verlag Ernst Steiniger from Volume 1 (1939) Issue 1 until its discontinuation with Volume 6 (1944) Issue 5. It was edited by German foreign minister Joachim von Ribbentrop.

The strongly propaganda-oriented monthly was published by Paul Carell of the Berlin Foreign Office after Italy's accession (1937) to the Anti-Comintern Pact of 1936. As a lavishly designed, bilingual magazine (German/Italian (Note: Title: Rivista mensile per lo sviluppo dei rapporti culturali fra i popoli del triangolo Berlino, Roma, Tokio)) in four-colour print, it was intended to accompany and document the close cooperation between these three states.
