= Funke Mediengruppe =

German media and newspaper company

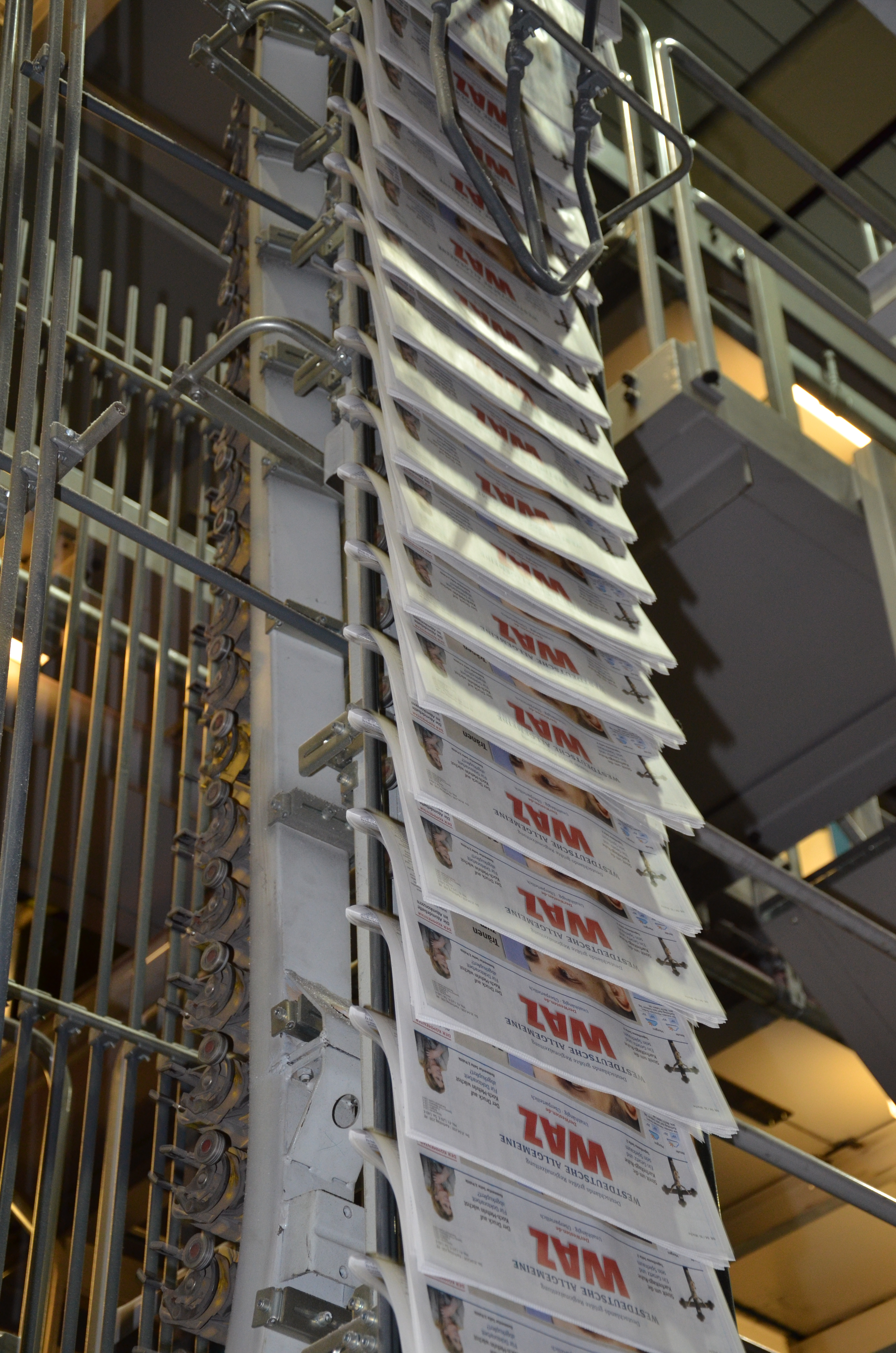
New "Westdeutsche Allgemeine Zeitung" just printed (2011)

Funke Mediengruppe (formerly WAZ-Mediengruppe) is Germany's third-largest newspaper and magazine publisher with a total of over 500 publications in eight countries. WAZ-Mediengruppe is privately held by the Funke family and is headquartered in Essen, North Rhine-Westphalia.

The group's largest paper is Westdeutsche Allgemeine Zeitung, the largest newspaper in the Ruhr metropolitan region. Other properties in Germany include the TV magazine Gong and the woman's magazine Die Aktuelle. Besides Germany, Funke Mediengruppe has publications in Austria, Hungary, Croatia, Albania, and Russia. The company formed Media Print Macedonia and owns several newspapers and magazines in North Macedonia. It also partially owns the Austrian Kronen Zeitung and Kurier.

In December 2010 WAZ Mediagroup sold all its assets in Bulgaria to a joint venture between Austrian investors and local tycoons. Until then the company had owned the two largest daily newspapers Trud and 24 hours, the weekly newspaper 168 hours, and a large portfolio of magazines.

In 2012, the Funke family bought out the shares of the Brost family and renamed the company. In 2013, Funke acquired several papers and magazines, including Berliner Morgenpost, Hamburger Abendblatt, Bild der Frau, and Hörzu, from Axel Springer AG.
