= Neue Werbung =

German trade magazine (1954–1991)

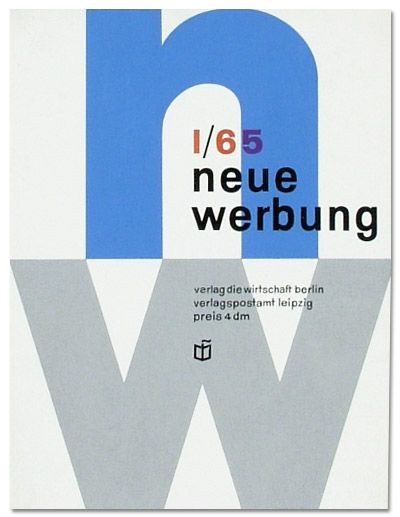
- Neue Werbung cover
- Categories: Trade magazine
- Publisher: Die Wirtschaft
- Founded: 1954
- First issue: April 1954
- Final issue: 1991
- Country: German Democratic Republic
- Based in: East Berlin
- Language: German

Neue Werbung (German: New Advertising) was an East German trade magazine specializing on advertising. Originally subtitled Fachzeitschrift für Werbung, Gebrauchsgrafik und Dekoration, the magazine was published between 1954 and 1991. Its headquarters was in East Berlin.

== History and profile ==
Neue Werbung was established in 1954. The first issue was published in April 1954. The magazine was published by Die Wirtschaft on a monthly basis in East Berlin. It was the official magazine of East Germany targeting advertising professionals. Each cover of the magazine was developed by East German designers. It featured thematic articles for the first ten years such as trademarks, industrial design, currency designs, and catalogue shopping. The magazine covered retailing activities in the country.

Neue Werbung had nearly a circulation of 17,000 copies. In 1959 its subtitle was redesigned as Fachzeitschrift für Theorie und Praxis der Sozialistischen Wirtschaftswerbung (German: Professional Journal for the Theory and Practice of Socialist Commercial Advertising). The magazine ceased publication in 1991.
