= Auto Magazin =

Monthly automobile magazine in Germany (1928–1931)

- Categories: Automobile magazine
- Frequency: Monthly
- Founded: 1928
- First issue: January 1928
- Final issue: 1931
- Country: Germany
- Based in: Berlin
- Language: German

Auto Magazin (German: Car Magazine) was a monthly automobile magazine which was published between 1928 and 1931 during the Weimar period in Berlin, Germany.

== History ==
The first issue of Auto Magazin appeared in Berlin in January 1928. The magazine was published on a monthly basis, and its goal was to provide news about the emerging automotive industry in Germany. It featured articles on the new car models of which performance features were given in detail. The mascot of the magazine was called Desmond which was a dog-like animal. It ceased publication in 1931.

Auto Magazin was digitized by the University of Erfurt and the Sächsische Landesbibliothek Dresden together with other publications of the Weimar period.
