= Peter Pirsch =

American inventor, businessman, and manufacturer

Peter T. Pirsch
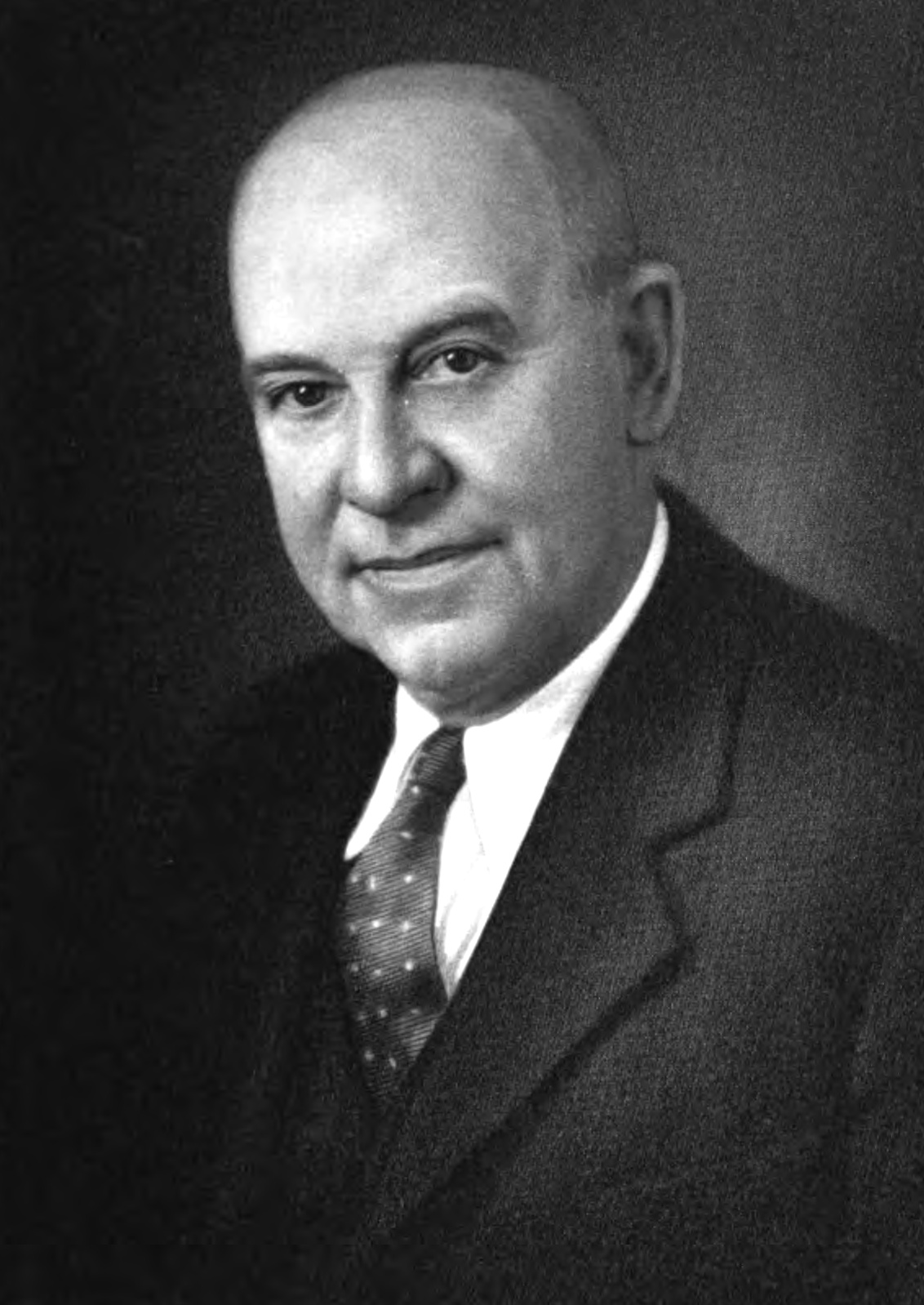
- Born: March 2, 1866; Kenosha, Wisconsin, U.S.
- Died: July 14, 1954; Kenosha, Wisconsin, U.S.
- Occupations: Inventor; businessman
- Years active: 1899–1954

Peter T. Pirsch (March 2, 1866 – July 14, 1954) was a manufacturer who founded Peter Pirsch and Sons, a Kenosha, Wisconsin–based manufacturer of fire apparatus. He is claimed to be the inventor of the first motorized fire engine.

== Personal life ==
Peter Pirsch was born in Kenosha on March 2, 1866 to Nicholas and Celia (Spielman) Pirsch. His father was an immigrant from Luxembourg that settled in Kenosha and founded a company to build carriages and wagons in 1861. He married Elizabeth Ritter in Chicago on January 15, 1885, and they had three children together. Pirsch died of a heart attack at the age of 88 on July 14, 1954.

== Fire equipment ==
Pirsch patented a compound trussed extension ladder in 1899 and went on to make hand- and horsedrawn ladder trucks. His first motorized ladder truck was on a Rambler chassis, and this was followed by others based on Couple Gear, White, Duplex, Nash and Dodge. In 1926 came the first complete Peter Pirsch fire engines; these were 150 to 750 gpm pumpers, chemical and hose trucks powered by 6-cylinder Waukesha engines. In 1928 came a pumper with fully enclosed cab, the first of its kind from a major US manufacturer, and in 1931 a one-man operation hydro-mechanical aerial ladder hoist used on an 85 ft articulated ladder truck. By this time Pirsch were building mostly on their own chassis, although others occasionally used were Sterling (1933), International (1936) and Diamond T (1937). Cabs were bought from General Motors for many years. In 1938 came the first 100 ft aluminum alloy closed lattice aerial ladder which became a Peter Pirsch specialty and is still used today.

Throughout the 1930s and 1940s a wide range of fire engines, including articulated ladder trucks were made, with power coming mostly from Hercules or Waukesha engines. All these had their engines under hoods, and the first cab forward model came in 1961 with a flat-fronted cab which is still used today. Conventionals and cab-forwards were made through the 1960s with little change, and Pirsch were also offering their specialties on other chassis such as Ford and Mack CF. Very few conventionals were made after 1970, and current production centers on rigid and articulated cab-forward units, mostly with diesel engines.

Peter Pirsch was known for carrying three changes of clothing in his car at all times, for different sales situations. He has a three-piece suit for talking to politicians and officials, a shirt and pants for city and county fire officials, and overalls for volunteer fire departments in rural communities.

Pirsch's company was very successful from the 1920s through the 1980s. The Memphis, Tennessee Fire Department and the Washington DC Fire Department were both particularly loyal customers of Pirsch fire trucks. Pirsch and Sons supplied many of the fire trucks sold throughout the State of Georgia from 1950 until 1980, with their first regional distributor being the Harold Hancock Company of Atlanta, followed by the Charles L. McLarty Company of Decatur, GA. Atlanta Georgia, and surrounding cities and towns bought dozens of Pirsch trucks supplied by these two local businesses.

Pirsch and Sons discontinued production of their trucks in the early 1980s after reorganization of the company, with the last truck coming off the line in 1987. The last custom Fire Engine built under the Pirsch name was delivered to, and is currently owned by the Osceola Fire Department in Osceola, AR (1987). Which is still in service to this day.
