= Civis mit Sonde =

German Christian democratic magazine

- Editor: Jannik Abt, Johann Fiedler
- Frequency: Irregular
- Publisher: Mario Voigt, Dorothee Bär, Ursula Männle, Arnold Vaatz, Matthias Wissmann
- Founder: Johannes Gross, Rüdiger Altmann, Wulf Schönbohm
- First issue: 1954; 72 years ago
- Country: Germany
- Language: German
- Website: civis-mit-sonde.de
- ISSN: 1432-6027

Civis mit Sonde ("Civilians with Probes") is a German Christian democratic political magazine published irregularly since 1954. According to its own description, the magazine's target audience includes students, academics, and members and functionaries of the CDU/CSU.

== History ==
The magazine resulted from the merger of the journals Civis and Sonde. Both originated within the Association of Christian Democratic Students.

In 1995, both of the magazines merged to form Civis mit Sonde.

== Editorial team ==
The magazine's editorial team is currently led by editors-in-chief Jannik Abt and Johann Fiedler.
