= Wild und Hund =

German Magazine

Wild und Hund logo.

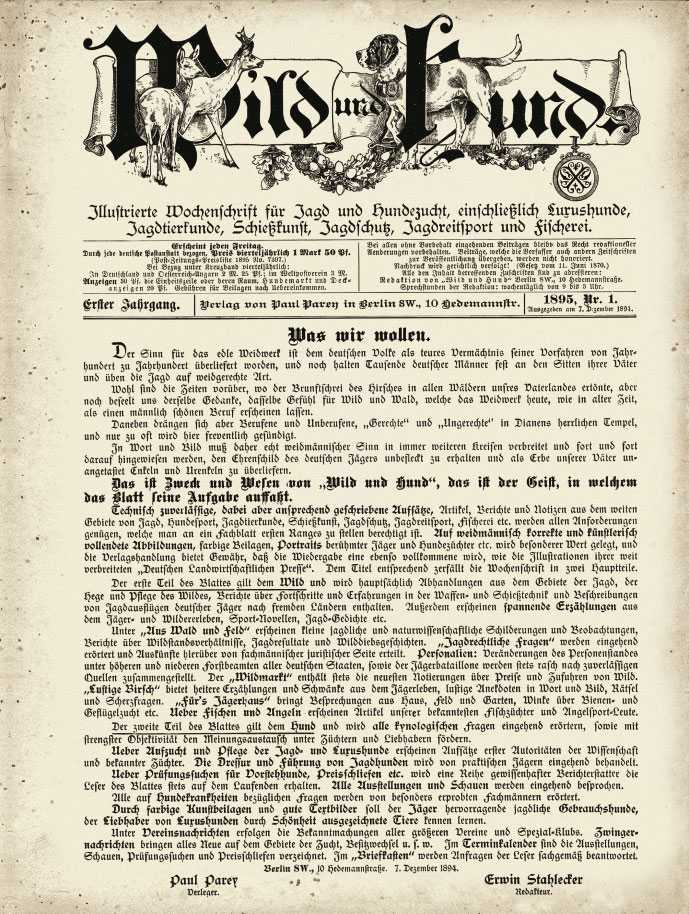
First edition of Wild und Hund, published in December 1894.

Wild und Hund (lit. Wildlife and Dogs) is a German-language, biweekly special interest journal on the subject of hunting, which is published by the Paul Parey magazine publisher in Singhofen/ Taunus. Editor-in-chief is Heiko Hornung as of May 2016.

== History and profile ==
Wild und Hund was founded by Paul Parey and has been published since 1894. It is the oldest and highest circulation hunting magazine in Germany. It covers hunting, equipment, game, territory, hunting policies and practices. The circulation is 66751 copies, of which 51230 are by subscription. Overall, the journal reaches about 350000 readers. and is sold in 54 countries
