= Das Neue Russland =

Magazine in Weimar Republic (1923–1933)

- Editor: Erich Baron
- Frequency: Monthly; Irregular (from 1930)
- Publisher: Berlin-Pankow
- Founded: 1923
- Final issue: October 1933
- Company: Society of Friends of the New Russia
- Country: Weimar Republic
- Based in: Berlin
- Language: German
- OCLC: 183382372

Das Neue Russland was a magazine which was published in Berlin, Weimar Republic, between 1923 and 1933. It was official media outlet of the Society of Friends of the New Russia. Its subtitle was Zeitschrift für Kultur, Wirtschaft und Literatur (German: Journal for culture, economics and literature).

== History and profile ==
Das Neue Russland was established by the Society of Friends of the New Russia in 1923. The magazine was published a Berlin-based company, Berlin-Pankow. It was started as a monthly publication, but it appeared irregularly from 1930. Its editor was Erich Baron. It folded in October 1933.

Some issues of Das Neue Russland were digitized by the University of Erfurt and the Sächsische Landesbibliothek Dresden together with other publications of the Weimar period.
