= Für Dich (magazine) =

Weekly women's magazine in Germany (1946–1991)

- Categories: Women's magazine
- Frequency: Weekly
- Founded: 1946
- Final issue: June 1991
- Country: East Germany; Germany
- Language: German
- ISSN: 0323-5947
- OCLC: 720413843

Für Dich (German: For You) was a weekly women's magazine published in East Germany and then in Germany following the unification. It was the only publication in East Germany which specifically targeted women. Official description of the magazine in 1988 was "illustrated weekly magazine for women, with contemporary political, economic and cultural contributions." It was in circulation between 1946 and 1991.

== History and profile ==
The magazine was established in 1946 under the title Die Frau von Heute. Next year in March it was made an official media outlet of the Democratic Women's League. It was renamed as Für Dich in 1963. The magazine was managed by the propaganda wing of the central committee of the ruling party of East Germany, namely Socialist Unity Party. It was published on a weekly basis. The fashion editor of the magazine was Edle von Krepl. Gislinde Schwarz was among the contributors. Following the unification of East Germany and West Germany in 1990 the magazine was acquired by Gruner + Jahr, a Hamburg-based publishing company. It significantly altered the editorial policy of the magazine which was modelled on another women's magazines Constanze and Tina. Because while being published in East Germany the frequent topics of the magazine included women's problems and policies in regard to women. However, these topics were replaced by fashion, travel tips and other similar subjects when the magazine became part of Gruner + Jahr. The former editors of Für Dich left the magazine because of their objections about this new design which would not lead to success. The magazine was closed down in July 1991 due to low sales.

=== Circulation ===
The magazine enjoyed higher levels of circulation varying between 300,000 copies and 600,000 copies. Für Dich sold 935,000 copies weekly in 1988. Just before its closure in 1991 its circulation was 90,000 copies.
