= Auf einen Blick =

Weekly TV magazine in Germany

- Categories: TV listing magazine; Women's magazine
- Frequency: Weekly
- Publisher: Bauer Verlag
- Founded: 1983
- Company: Bauer Group
- Country: Germany
- Based in: Hamburg
- Language: German
- Website: Auf einen Blick

Auf einen Blick is a German language television and women's magazine published in Hamburg, Germany. It has been in circulation since 1983.

== History and profile ==
Auf einen Blick was founded in 1983. The magazine is part of and published by Bauer Media Group. It is headquartered in Hamburg. It is published on a weekly basis and covers both news on women-related issues and TV programme listings. Its target audience is women older than 40.

== Circulation ==
Auf einen Blick had a circulation of 850,000 copies during the fourth quarter of 1984. During the third quarter of 1992 its circulation was up to 3,103,000 copies. The circulation of the magazine was down to 2,706,712 copies between October and December 1994. It was down to 2,504,000 copies during the third quarter of 1995 and 2,310,000 copies during the third quarter of 1996.

In 2001 Auf einen Blick had a circulation of 1,981,000 copies, making it the tenth best-selling TV guide worldwide. The magazine had an average circulation of 1,624,000 copies in 2003. In the fourth quarter of 2006 its circulation was down to 1,514,600 copies. Its circulation was down to 1,462,074 copies during the second quarter of 2007. In 2010 the magazine had a circulation of 1,261,814 copies.

== See also ==
- List of magazines in Germany
