= Seidels Reklame =

German advertising trade magazine (1913–1942)

- Categories: Advertising trade magazine
- Founder: Wilhelm Seidel
- Founded: 1913
- Final issue: 1942
- Country: German Empire
- Based in: Berlin
- Language: German

Seidels Reklame (German: Seidel's Advertising) was a German advertising trade and graphic art magazine which was in circulation between 1913 and 1942. It was based in Berlin, Germany.

== History and profile ==
Seidels Reklame was founded by Wilhelm Seidel in Berlin in 1913. The first editor was Robert Hösel, and its subtitle was Das Blatt der Praxis. From May 1935 the magazine was renamed as Werben und Verkaufen (German: Advertising and Selling) and published until this title until its closure in 1942.

Seidels Reklame covered articles about the developments in advertising and relevant legal issues, including chicanery and plagiarism. During the Weimar Republic it supported the use of advertisements in which modern, independent and provocative women were featured. It is one of the earliest German publications which used the term public relations in 1937. One of the contributors was Julius Pinschewer who stressed the significant roles of the advertising films in attracting consumers. Robert Hösel also published articles describing experiments on the optimal color combinations to produce the most effective contrast between text and background on posters.
