= Dein Spiegel =

German children's magazine

- Categories: Children's magazine News magazine
- Frequency: Monthly
- Publisher: Spiegel Verlag
- First issue: 1 September 2009; 15 years ago
- Company: Spiegel Verlag
- Country: Germany
- Based in: Hamburg
- Language: German
- Website: Dein Spiegel
- ISSN: 1868-7334

Dein Spiegel (German: Your Mirror) is a monthly German magazine aimed at young people. The magazine provides news in an appealing and educative way. It has been in circulation since 2009.

== History and profile ==
Dein Spiegel was first published on 1 September 2009. The magazine began to be published monthly in December 2009. The publisher of the monthly is Spiegel Verlag which publishes Der Spiegel among others. The co-chief editors of the monthly were Georg Mascolo and Mathias Müller von Blumencron until 2013 when they both left the company. There is a four-member core editorial team in addition to 20 editors who also write for Der Spiegel.

The magazine targets children ages between 8 and 14. The contents of the magazine mirror those in Der Spiegel, but they are offered in an age-appropriate manner and entertaining and educational way. The topics covered include stories of politics, economics, nature and technology, culture, sport and people in Germany and other countries. The monthly also publishes interviews undertaken by child reporters one of which was with Jose Manuel Barroso, President of the European Commission, in Hamburg in April 2012. The publisher, Spiegel Verlag, introduces Dein Spiegel as "the news magazine for enquiring girls and boys". Arnd Zickgraf describes the magazine as the first political children's magazine.

The 2010 circulation of Dein Spiegel was 150,000 copies. Spiegel Gruppe announced its 2011 circulation as 67,326 copies.

== See also ==
- List of magazines in Germany
