= Computer Zeitung =

German computer magazine

Computer Zeitung was the first German computer magazine, founded in 1970, and launched at the first CeBIT computer expo. It was published weekly on Mondays, in the Berliner newspaper format.

The publisher was the Konradin Verlag, with Rainer Huttenloher as the editor-in-chief since 2002.

== History ==
Since October 2009, the homepage of the Computerzeitung is not longer active and redirected to the German magazine Bild der Wissenschaft.

Since December 2010 a new Computerzeitung is available in Switzerland. The monthly magazine is available for free, with about 200,000 units per month.
