= Zeit Wissen =

- Editor-in-chief: Andreas Lebert
- Categories: Science magazine
- Frequency: Bi-monthly
- Circulation: 104,000 (Q4 2024)
- Publisher: Zeitverlag Gerd Bucerius
- Founded: 2004; 21 years ago
- First issue: 4 December 2004; 20 years ago
- Company: Zeitverlag Gerd Bucerius
- Country: Germany
- Based in: Hamburg
- Language: German
- Website: Zeit Wissen

ZEIT WISSEN is a bi-monthly popular science magazine published in Germany. The magazine is spun off from the German weekly newspaper Die Zeit. The German phrase "Zeit Wissen" literally translates to "Time Knowledge". The magazine publishes the biweekly podcast "Woher weißt Du das?".

== History ==
ZEIT WISSEN was launched in 2004. The magazine is published by Zeitverlag Gerd Bucerius. The first editor-in-chief of the magazine was Christoph Drösser. The editor-in-chief of the magazine is Andreas Lebert who was appointed to the post in August 2013, replacing Jan Schweitzer.

The magazine frequently is compared to the American publication Wired, in that it covers the cutting-edge developments in technology, science, history, fashion, modern lifestyles, avant-garde art, photography, health, and food. In 2009 ZEIT WISSEN Podcast was launched. It is one of the top German popular science podcasts.

The Q4 2024 circulation of Zeit Wissen was 104,634 copies. It reaches 0,7 to 1,5 Mio. readers per copy.

== See also ==
- List of magazines in Germany
