= Gong (magazine) =

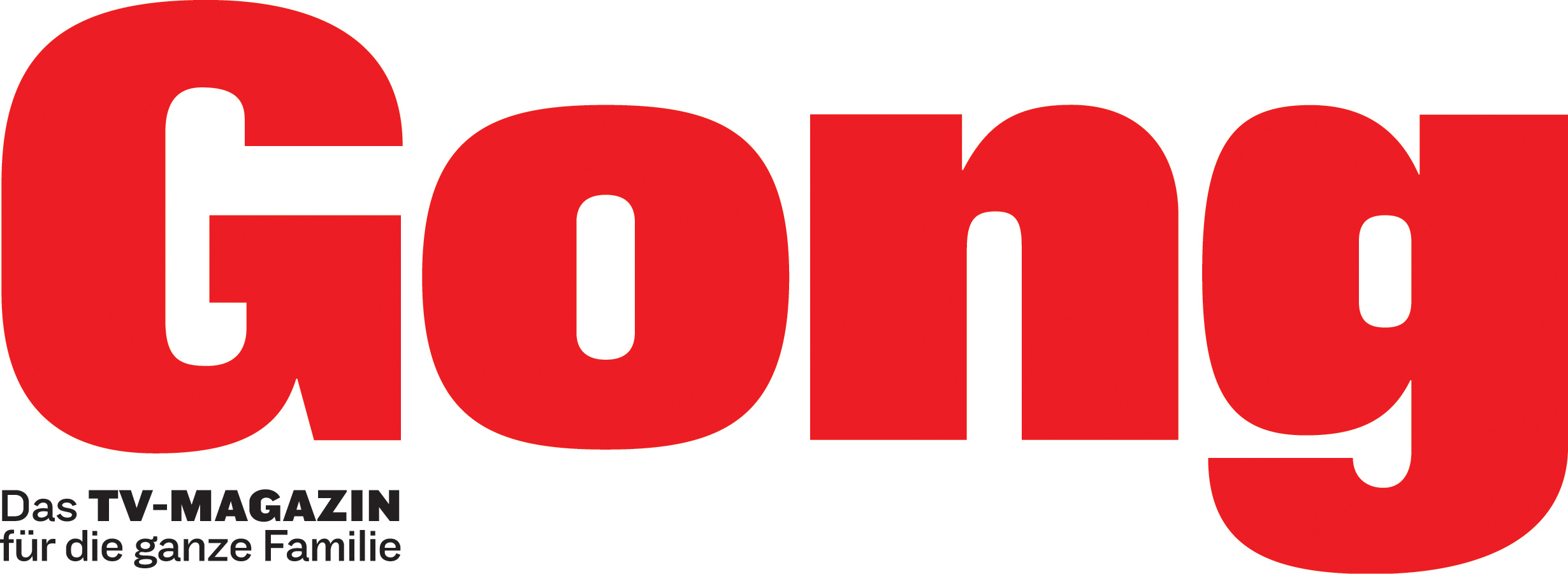

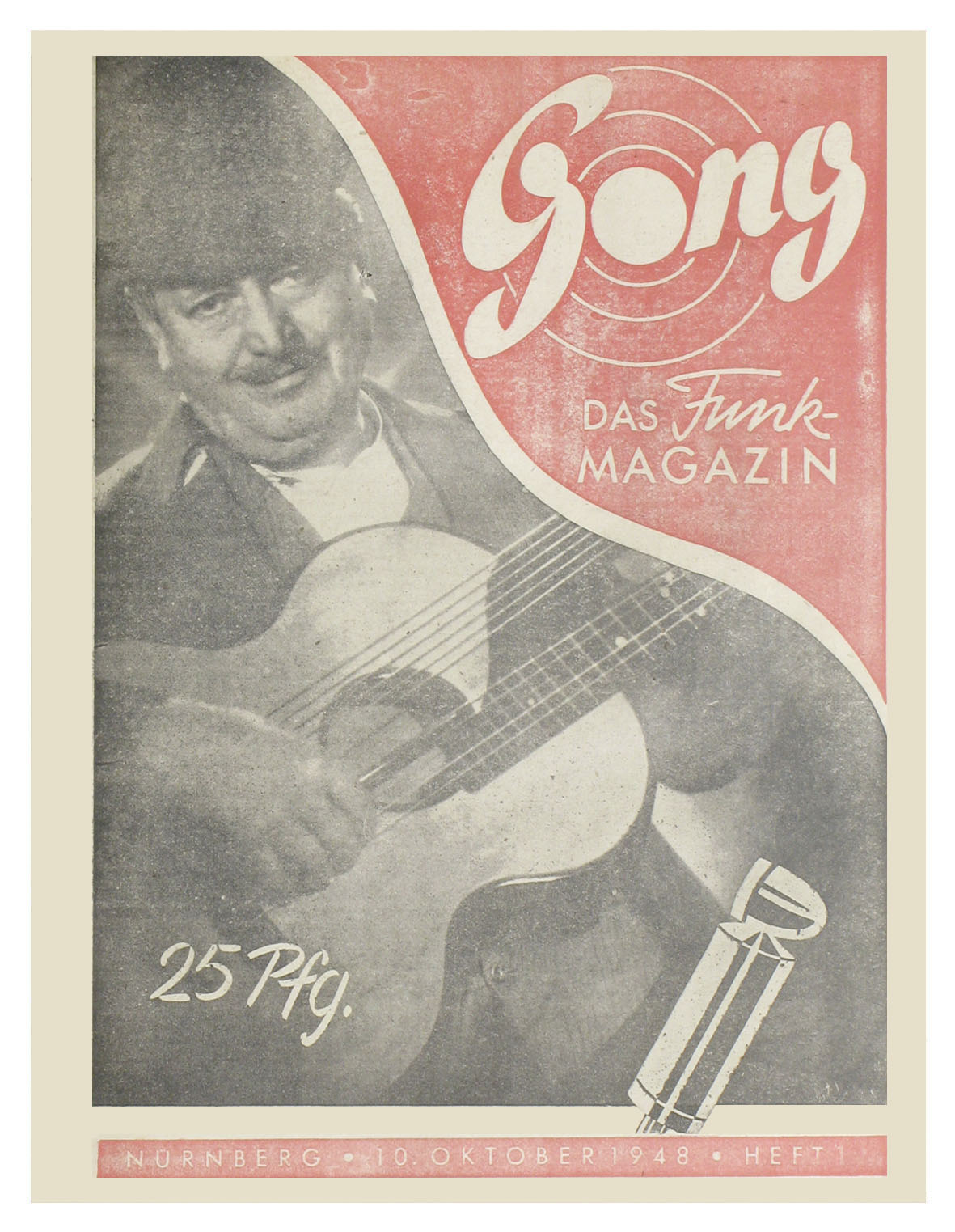
- Cover of the first issue
- Categories: Television listings magazine
- Frequency: Weekly
- First issue: 10 October 1948
- Company: Funke Mediengruppe
- Country: Germany
- Based in: Nuremberg
- Language: German
- Website: www.gong.de

Gong is a German radio and (today, primarily) television listings magazine owned and published by the German media conglomerate Funke Mediengruppe.

An extract from the magazine, was featured in the secondary school early '90s German textbook Zickzack, as part of a reading exercise.

== History and profile ==
The first edition of Gong appeared in October 1948. The magazine is published weekly and has its headquarters in Nuremberg. It was formerly based in Munich.

Since 1979, the magazine has awarded annual Goldener Gong prizes for outstanding achievement by actors, directors, writers, presenters, and producers in the German television world.
