= Bodos Power Systems =

Bodo's Power Systems
- Editor-in-chief: Bodo Arlt
- Categories: News magazine
- Frequency: Monthly
- Circulation: 25,000/month
- Publisher: Bodo's Power Systems-Verlag
- Founded: 2006
- Country: Germany
- Based in: Laboe
- Language: English
- Website: www.bodospower.de www.bodospower.com
- ISSN: 1863-5598

Bodo's Power Systems, also known as Bodo's Power Systems Magazine, is a German monthly news magazine focusing exclusively on power electronics and is published in Laboe. The editor-in-chief is Bodo Arlt.

== Overview ==
Bodo's Power Systems was established in 2006. The magazine is part of A Media. It offers access to general power electronics information, industry news, and company specific solutions for power electronics applications. Articles are written as contributions by technology experts from the industry.

== Cost of usage ==
Bodo's Power Systems is financed by advertisements, and paper copies are distributed according to a free-of-charge subscription list.

== PowerGuru ==
In June 2012, the web-based power electronics information platform PowerGuru started a cooperation with Bodo's Power Systems and provides a fully searchable, categorizable, and commentable archive of all Bodo's Power Systems articles since its establishment in 2006.

== EE Power ==
In May 2016, Bodo's Power Systems partnered with EE Power, which is now the exclusive English language digital channel for the magazine's content.
