= Peter Pirsch and Sons =

Defunct American firefighting manufacturer

Peter Pirsch & Sons
- Industry: Fire Engine
- Founded: 1900
- Defunct: 1986
- Fate: Bankrupt, 1986
- Successor: North Central Fire Apparatus
- Headquarters: Kenosha, Wisconsin, United States
- Key people: Peter Pirsch
- Products: Firefighting apparatus

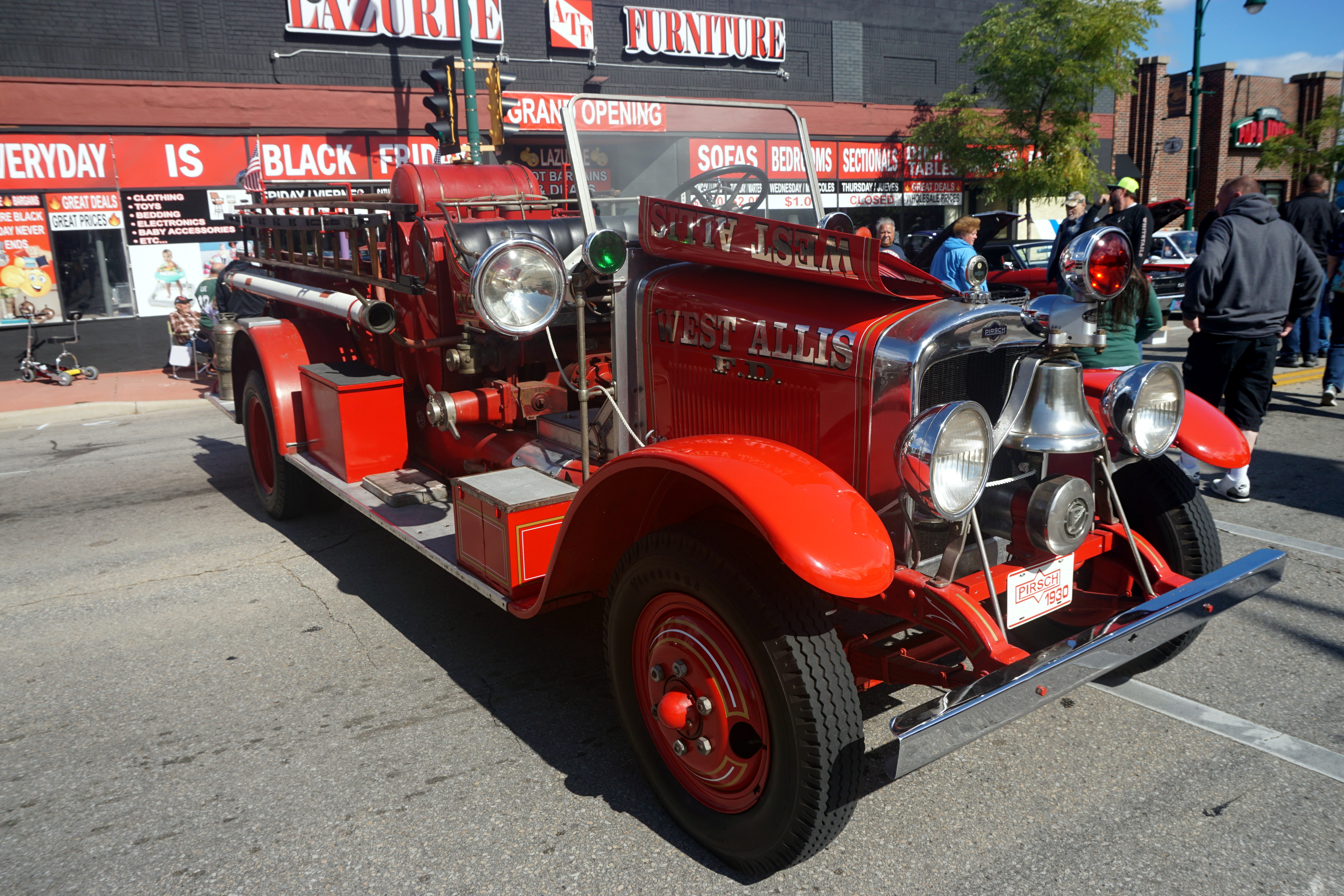
West Allis Fire Department 1930 Pirsch fire engine

1934 Dodge-Pirsch Pumper at the Kenosha History Center in Kenosha, Wisconsin

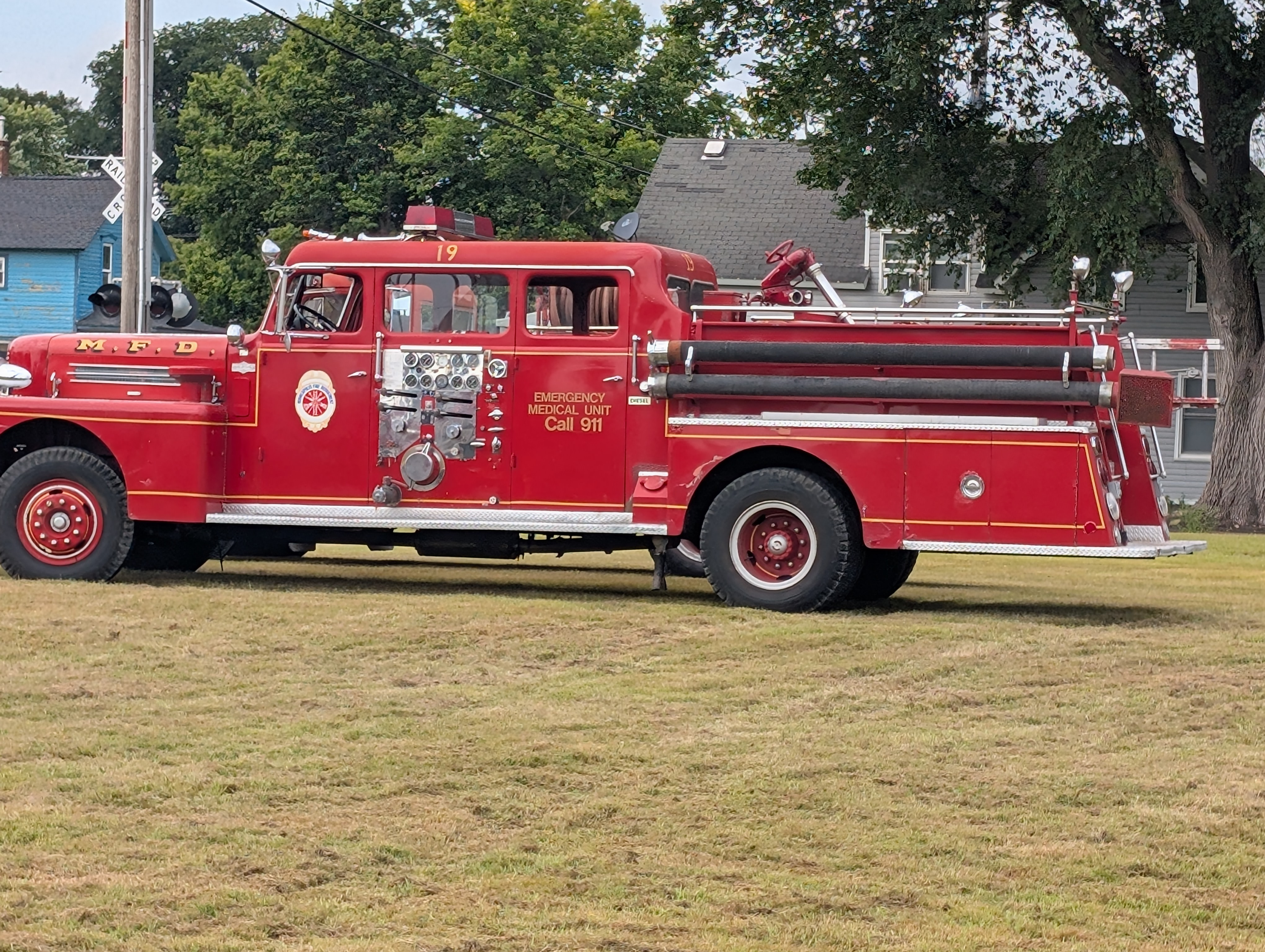
1972 Pirsch Pumper

Peter Pirsch & Sons was a firefighting apparatus manufacturer in Kenosha, Wisconsin, United States, between 1900 and 1984. It was claimed to be the first producer of modern, motorized fire engines in the United States.

== History ==
In 1899, while working at his father's carriage manufacturing business and volunteering for the Kenosha, Wisconsin fire department, Peter Pirsch received the patent for the trussed extension ladder, a marked improvement upon the older, solid ladders that firemen had been using up to that point. With patent in hand, he founded Peter Pirsch & Sons in 1900.

The first motorized ladder truck was on a Rambler chassis, and this was followed by others based on Couple Gear, White, Duplex, Nash and Dodge. The 1926 engine came 150 to 750 gpm pumpers, chemical and hose trucks powered by 6-cylinder Waukesha engines. In 1928 came a pumper with fully enclosed cab, the first of its kind from a major U.S. manufacturer, and in 1931 a one-man operation hydro-mechanical aerial ladder hoist used on an 85–ft articulated ladder truck. By this time Pirsch were building mostly on their own chassis, although others occasionally used were Sterling (1933), International (1936) and Diamond T (1937). Cabs were bought from General Motors for many years. In 1938 came the first 100–ft aluminum alloy closed lattice aerial ladder which became a Peter Pirsch specialty and is still used today.

Throughout the 1930s and 1940s a wide range of fire engines, including articulated ladder trucks were made, with power coming mostly from Hercules or Waukesha engines. Pirsch first introduced aerial ladders in the 1930s, including the first fully powered 100–foot aerial ladder device in the United States in 1935.

The first cab forward model came in 1961 with a flat-fronted cab which is still used today. Conventionals and cab-forwards were made through the 1960s with little change, and Pirsch were also offering their specialties on other chassis such as Ford and Mack CF. Very few conventionals were made after 1970, and current production centers on rigid and articulated cab-forward units, mostly with diesel engines.

Pirsch's company was very successful from the 1920s through the 1980s. The Memphis, Tennessee Fire Department and the Washington DC Fire Department were both particularly loyal customers of Pirsch fire trucks. By the late 1980s, the company built around 100 trucks a year and conducted around $10 million a year in business.

Pirsch and Sons supplied many of the fire trucks sold throughout the state of Georgia from 1950 until 1980, with their first regional distributor being the Harold Hancock Company of Atlanta, followed by the Charles L. McLarty Company of Decatur, Georgia. Atlanta, Georgia and surrounding cities and towns bought dozens of Pirsch trucks supplied by these two local businesses.

Pirsch and Sons discontinued production of their trucks in the early 1980s after reorganization of the company due to rising costs and increased competition in the narrow fire truck market. The last truck coming off the line in 1987. At the time of its closure, Peter Pirsch & Sons was the oldest privately owned fire truck manufacturer in the United States. The last custom fire engine built under the Pirsch name was delivered to, and is currently owned by the Osceola, Arkansas Volunteer Fire Department. (1987).
