= Schnitt (magazine) =

Film magazine in Germany (1995–2013)

- Editor-in-chief: Oliver Baumgarten
- Categories: Film magazine
- Frequency: Quarterly
- Founder: Nikolaj Nikitin; Oliver Baumgarten
- Founded: 1995
- Final issue: 2013
- Country: Germany
- Based in: Cologne
- Language: German
- Website: Schnitt
- ISSN: 0949-7803
- OCLC: 640025104

Schnitt (German: Editing), also called Schnitt - Das Filmmagazin, was a German language film magazine founded by Nikolaj Nikitin and Oliver Baumgarten in Germany. The magazine was headquartered in Cologne and was published between 1995 and 2013.

== History and profile ==
Schnitt was started by Nikolaj Nikitin and Oliver Baumgarten in 1995. Baumgarten was also the editor-in-chief of the magazine from its start in 1995 to 2010. The headquarters of the magazine was in Cologne. The magazine, which was published four times a year, focused on the effects of the films on the viewer and on the technical features of the films. It also featured articles about the correlations between films and other media and arts, including painting as well as on the history of films, film theory, short films and major figures in the film industry.

Although Schnitt was published in German, some of its issues were published both in German and English. The magazine ceased publication in 2013.

== See also ==
List of magazines in Germany
