= Das Pfennig-Magazin =

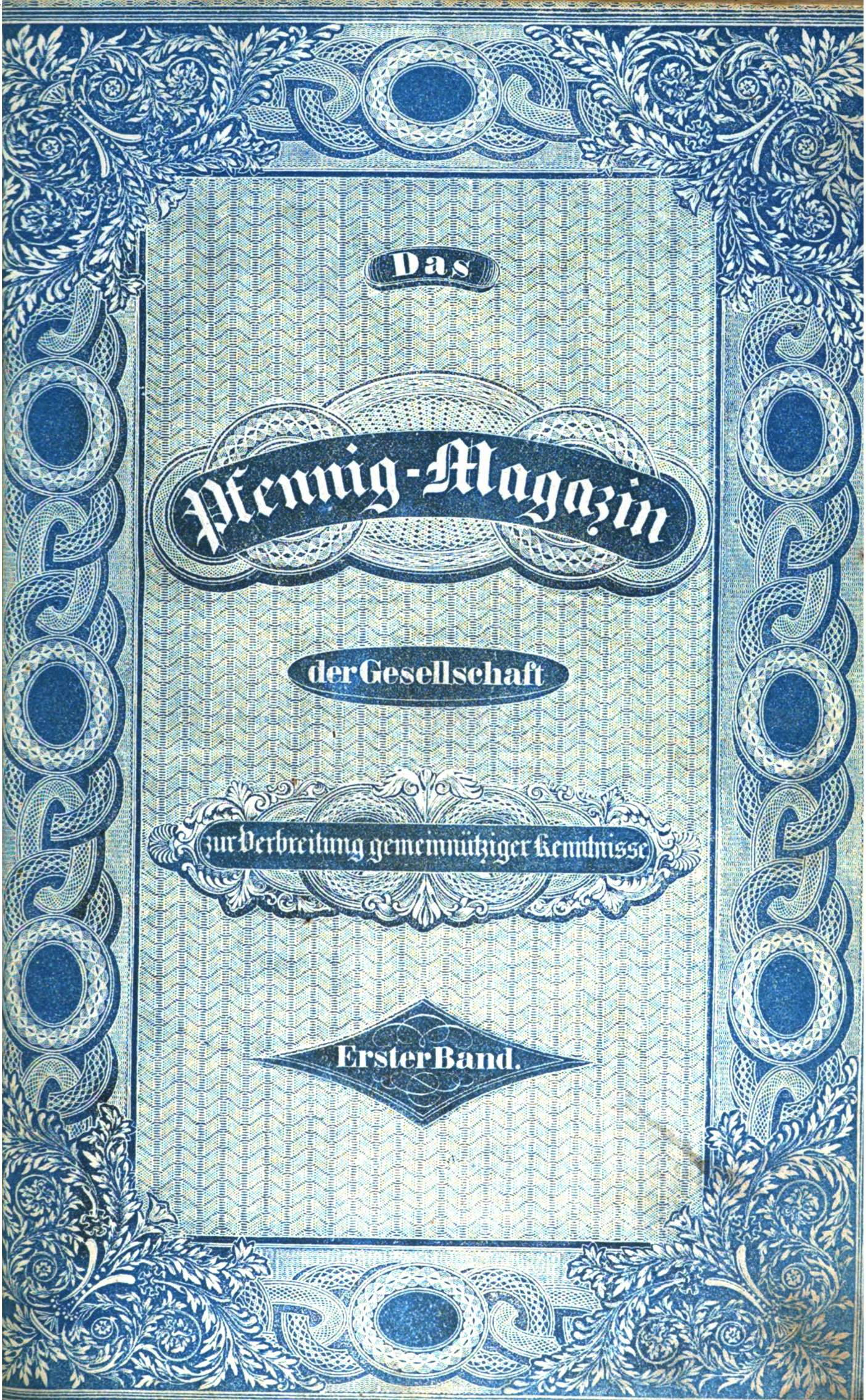
Das Pfennig-Magazin

The Pfennig-Magazin (Penny Magazine), produced jointly with the "Society for disseminating shared practical knowledge" ("Gesellschaft zur Verbreitung gemeinnütziger Kenntnisse") was the first weekly German-language journal for sharing popular scientific and other knowledge by combining text with images. This was made possible by the development of Wood engraving technology which was better suited for reproducing images in large numbers than the copper plate engraving technology used hitherto.

The Pfennig-Magazin appeared each week, starting on 4 May 1833 and continuing to appear till 1855. Circulation peaked at around 100,000 copies in 1847. The paper had a fixed eight page format, incorporating up to six images in each edition.

Editorial control was under the book dealer (later also a publisher) Johann Jacob Weber who after 1843 set up the Illustrirte Zeitung which took forward several of the ideas pioneered with the Pfennig-Magazin.

== Context ==
The Pfennig-Magazin was part of a wider trend across much of Europe. The first magazine combining text and images in this way was probably the Penny Magazine which appeared in England in 1832, courtesy of the London-based Society for the Diffusion of Useful Knowledge, intended for the working class and the middle class, "as an antidote to the more radical output of the pauper presses". The French publisher, Martin Bossange, whose son ran a publishing business in London, and whose own business had recently filed for bankruptcy in Paris, was able to help Weber to produce the Pfennig-Magazin, a German language equivalent, in Leipzig. After a few years the publishing house F.A. Brockhaus AG took over the Pfennig-Magazin from Weber who now set himself up as a publisher on his own account.

Journalism in the German Confederation during the 1830s was governed by press laws. All publications up to twenty printed pages had to be submitted to the censor, and incurred a stamp tax which was calibrated so as to limit discussion of political matters as far as possible. The way in which the Pfennig-Magazin restricted itself to subjects such as ethnology, archaeology, art history, religious, technical and natural history themes was based not on some conception of what was appropriate for popular education, but on the desire to minimise taxes driven by items on current affairs and politics.

During the 1840s the appearance of rival illustrated magazines forced the Pfennig-Magazin to adapt itself to changes in consumer taste. The journal carried beneath its main title the sub-title "für Belehrung und Unterhaltung" ("For instruction and entertainment"). Starting in January 1843 a longer sub-title was added: "Wir glauben dem Zweck unseres Magazins, gemeinnützige Kenntnisse zu verbreiten, dahingehend erweitern zu müssen, daß dies nicht mehr, wie bisher blos in der Form der Belehrung, sondern so weit es möglich ist, auch in der Form der Unterhaltung geschehe." ("We believe it is axiomatic that the objective of our magazine, to disseminate shared practical knowledge, must be broadened, so that it no longer crudely didactic, but also enhances the entertainment side of things.") Nevertheless, after 1847 circulation declined, and the Pfennig-Magazin ceased publication in 1855.
