= Hörzu =

German magazine

- Sample cover
- Editor: Christian Hellmann
- Categories: TV guide
- Frequency: Weekly
- Circulation: 1,038,901 (Q2 2016)
- First issue: 1946; 80 years ago
- Company: Funke Mediengruppe
- Country: Germany
- Based in: Hamburg
- Language: German
- Website: www.hoerzu.de

Hörzu (German: [ˌhøːɐ̯ˈtsuː]) is a German weekly television listings magazine published in Hamburg.

== History and profile ==
Hörzu first appeared in 1946 and was published by Axel Springer as the first radio program magazine to be produced in what was then the British zone of occupation. Over the years Hörzu has shifted the emphasis of its coverage from radio to television programs. The magazine is based in Hamburg.

The first edition of the magazine appeared on 11 December 1946 as HÖR ZU! Die Rundfunkzeitung ("LISTEN! The radio newspaper") as it was originally entitled. There were three editions in the first year of publication, 48 in 1947, and since then the magazine has appeared 52 or 53 times annually.

The circulation of the magazine increased rapidly. 1949 saw the first appearance of Mecki, Hörzu's cartoon hedgehog mascot. Since 1965, the Hörzu has awarded the annual Golden Camera television prize.

In early 2010, the bimonthly magazine Hörzu Wissen ("Hörzu Knowledge") was launched, which covers science, history, health, and technology topics. The magazine launch was considered a major success by Springer AG, with the premiere issue selling 130,000 copies.

The magazine was sold to Funke Mediengruppe in 2013.

=== Record subsidiary ===
Beginning in 1963 Hörzu produced and released long playing records as a subsidiary of Electrola, Cologne. In 1968 it started a progressive and avantgarde music label, Hör Zu Black Label.

== Circulation ==
During the third quarter of 1992 the circulation of Hörzu was 3,103,000 copies. The magazine had a circulation of 2,426,000 copies during the third quarter of 1995 and 2,367,000 copies during the third quarter of 1996. In 1999 the circulation of the magazine was 2,226,700 copies.

It was one of fifty best-selling television magazines worldwide with a circulation of 2,077,000 copies in 2001. The average circulation of Hörzu was 1,678,000 copies in 2003. In the fourth quarter of 2006 its circulation was 1,585,100 copies. The magazine had a circulation of 1,431,490 copies in 2010. In 2012 the circulation of the magazine was 1,275,600 copies. During the second quarter of 2016 it was 1,038,901 copies.

== Editors-in-chief of Hörzu ==
- Eduard Rhein (1946)
- Hans Bluhm (1965)
- Peter Bachér (1974)
- Felix Schmidt (1985)
- Helmut Reinke (1987)
- Klaus Stampfuss (1989)
- Andreas Petzold (1997)
- Michael Lohmann (1999)
- Jörg Walberer (2001)
- Thomas Garms (2003)
- Christian Hellmann (2009)
