= Axel Springer SE =

European multinational multimedia company

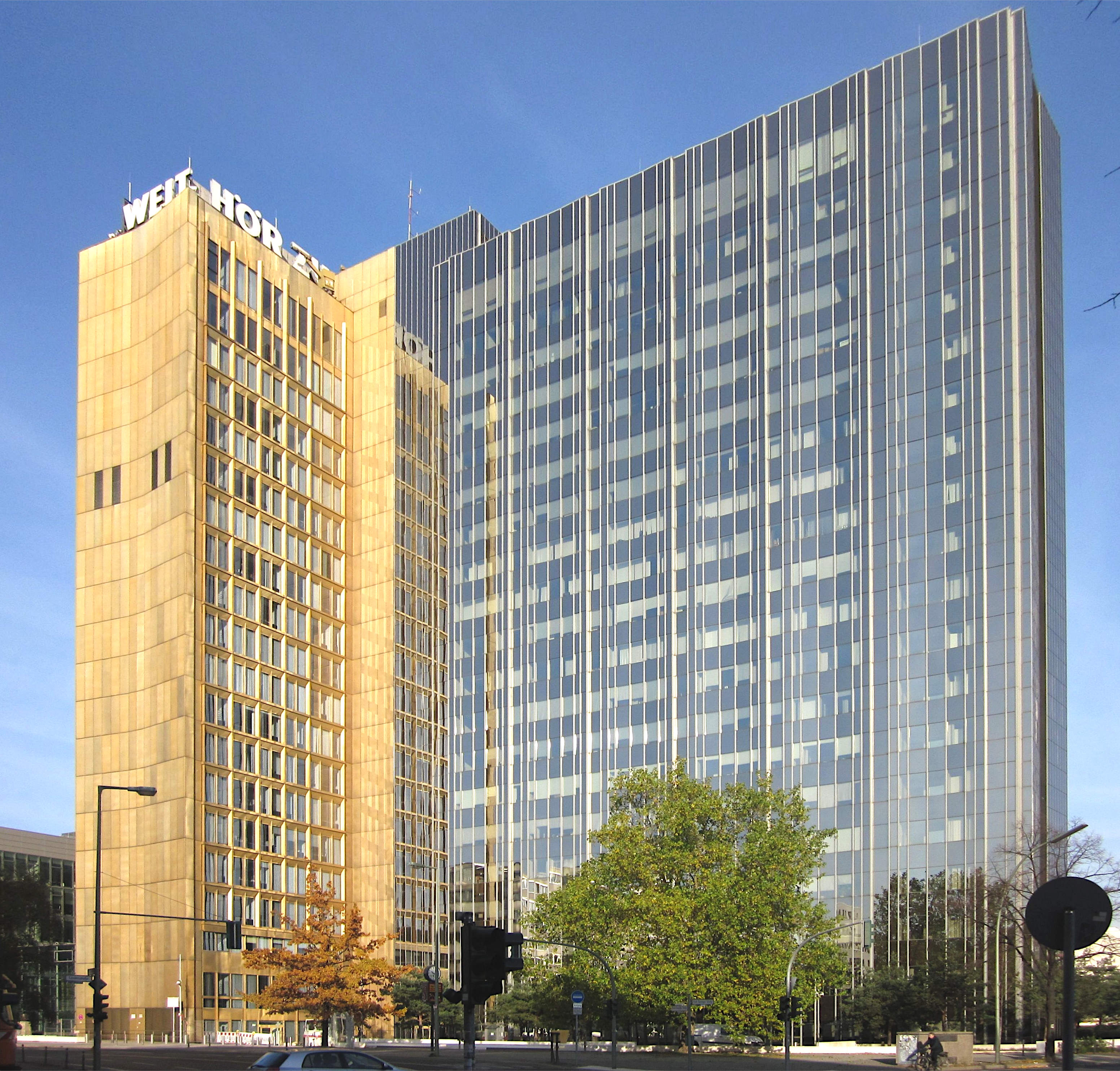
- Headquarters in Berlin
- Type: Societas Europaea
- ISIN: DE0005501357
- Industry: Publishing
- Founded: 1946; 80 years ago
- Founder: Axel Springer
- Headquarters: Berlin, Germany
- Key people: Mathias Döpfner (CEO and chairman of the management board); Ralph Büchi (chairman of the supervisory board)
- Products: Magazines, newspapers, online portals, affiliate marketing
- Revenue: ▼€3.11 billion (2019)
- Operating income: ▼€414.5 million (2019)
- Net income: ▼€134.6 million (2019)
- Total assets: ▲€7.08 billion (2019)
- Total equity: ▼€2.45 billion (2019)
- Owners: KKR (36%); Friede Springer (22%); Mathias Döpfner (22%); CPPIB (13%)
- Number of employees: c. 18,000 (2023)
- Website: axelspringer.com/en/

Axel Springer SE (German: [ˈaksl̩ ˈʃpʁɪŋɐ ɛsˈeː]) is a European multinational mass and online media company, based in Berlin, Germany. The company offers printing and publishing of advertisements, digital classifieds portfolio, marketing models and related services. Axel Springer's operations are segmented into News Media, Classifieds Media, and Marketing Media. The company is organized as a societas Europaea (SE) publishing house and is one of the largest mass media publishers in the European Union, with numerous multimedia news brands, such as Bild, Die Welt, Fakt, and the US political news site Politico, which Axel Springer acquired in 2021.

The company generated total revenues of about €3.93 billion and an EBITDA increase of 12.8% in the first half of 2023. Following US private-equity firm KKR's majority-stake acquisition in 2020, Axel Springer's revenues have increased by a total of approximately €1 billion. The company, including its subsidiaries, joint ventures, and licenses, operates in more than 40 countries.

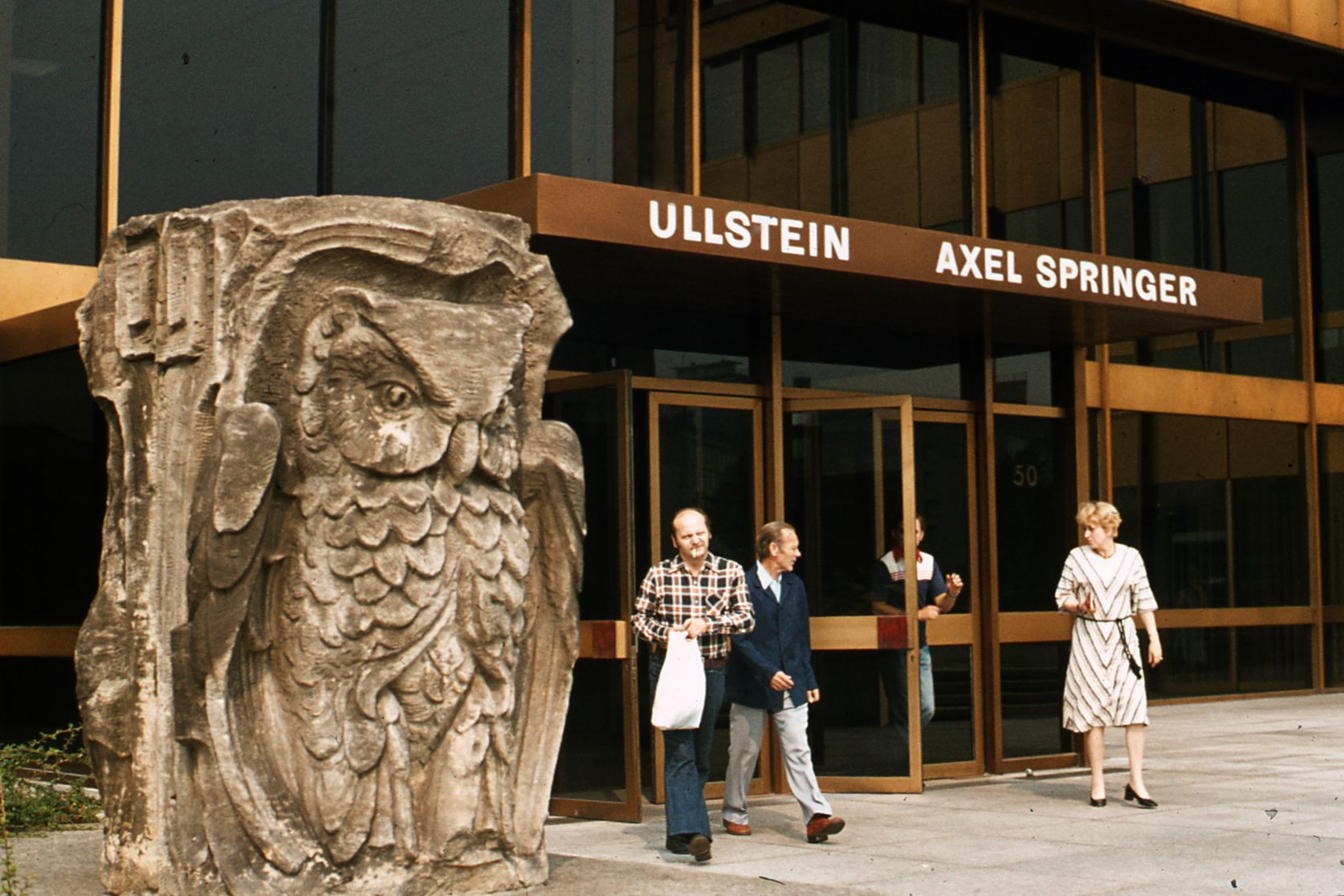
Front entrance to the Axel Springer headquarters building in West Berlin, 1977, with the Fritz Klimsch owl sculpture

The company was started in 1946 by journalist Axel Springer. Mathias Döpfner became its CEO in 2002. In 2004, Axel Springer company, the largest publishing house in Europe at that time, controlled the largest German market share for daily newspapers; 23.6%, largely because its flagship tabloid Bild is the highest-circulation newspaper in Europe with a daily readership exceeding 12 million. By 2022, the company had a market share of 10.6% in Germany.

October 2022 data indicates that Axel Springer's BILD brands attract approximately six million unique users daily, totaling up to 40 million unique users per month. IVW's data from June 2023 shows BILD receiving 504 million monthly visits and WELT achieving 127 million. In the United States, Axel Springer is ranked among the top four digital publishers, alongside USA Today, News Corp, and The New York Times.

== Newspapers, magazines, online offerings ==
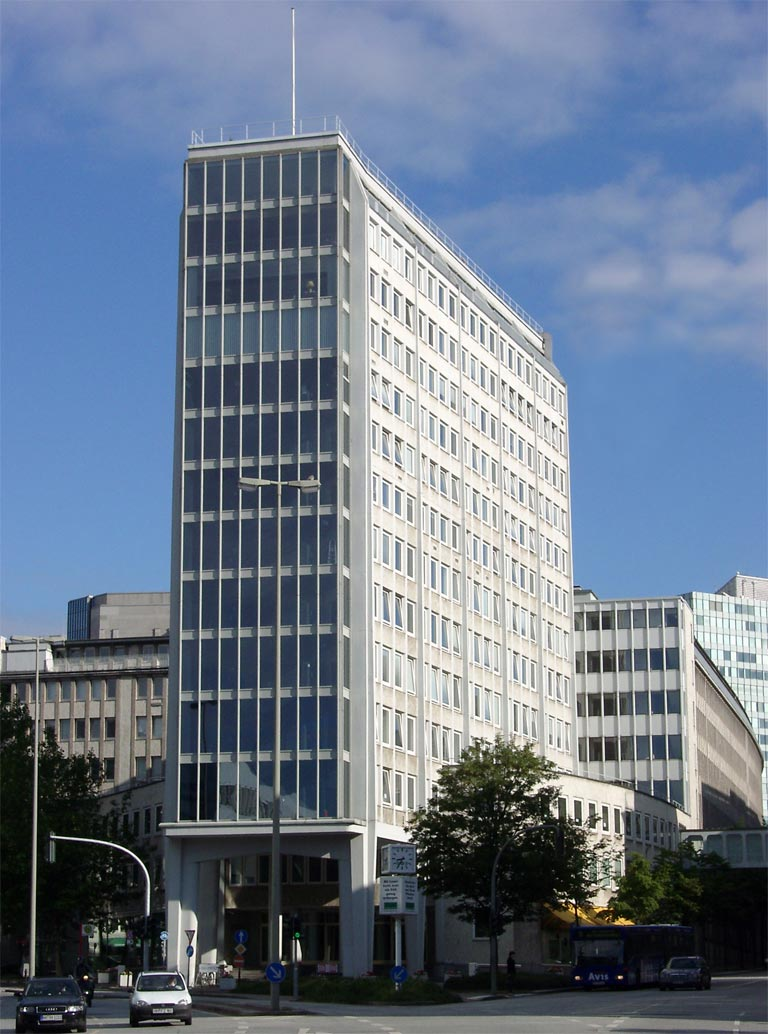
Axel Springer building in Hamburg

=== BILD ===
- Audio Video Foto Bild, magazine for consumer electronics
- Bild, tabloid with the largest circulation in Europe
- B.Z., local newspaper
- Computer Bild, published in nine countries, Europe's best-selling computer magazine
- Sport Bild, Europe's largest sport magazine
- Transfermarkt, a football transfer information website
- Fame Fighting a German celebrity boxing promotion

=== WELT ===
- Die Welt, the company's intellectual flagship, including the Welt TV news channel

=== The Telegraph ===
- The Daily Telegraph & The Sunday Telegraph, British broadsheet newspapers.

=== Multinational media ===
- Business Insider, a business, celebrity and technology news website
- Politico, a digital media company acquired by Axel Springer in October 2021 that operates in North America and Europe.
- Politico Europe, European version of Politico
- Upday, a news aggregator app

=== Other ===
- BONIAL, a marketing solutions company, which includes coupon portals, Sparheld.de Germany and Reduc.fr in France
- Dyn Media, a live broadcast sports platform
- Idealo, a price comparison service
- Morning Brew, a media company that focuses on business newsletters and podcasts

=== Classifieds ===
- Aviv, which includes real estate marketing portals immonet, immowelt, and SeLoger
- Stepstone

=== Ringier Axel Springer Poland ===
The following properties are operated by Ringier Axel Springer Media AG, a joint venture with Ringier.

- AUTO SWIAT
- Fakt, the largest daily tabloid in Poland
- Forbes Women, a spinoff of magazine and web portal Forbes that focuses on gender equality in business
- Newsweek Polska, a Polish weekly news magazine
- Onet, a Polish online news publication

=== Marketing media ===
- AWIN, a company that provides solutions for product marketing and services

== History ==
=== 1940s ===
In 1946, publisher Hinrich Springer (age 66) and his son Axel Springer (age 34) established the limited company Axel Springer Verlag GmbH. That year saw the launch of the Nordwestdeutsche Hefte and the radio and Hörzu, which was originally launched as a radio broadcast but later became a TV magazine as well.

In 1948, the afternoon and evening newspaper Hamburger Abendblatt was launched, the first daily newspaper created by Axel Springer.

=== 1950s ===
The year 1952 saw the launch of the popular daily newspaper Bild. The paper was based on the British tabloid Daily Mirror and peaked at a circulation of 5 million in the 1980s. The Sunday paper Bild am Sonntag was launched in 1956.

In 1953, Axel Springer Verlag bought the publishing house Die Welt, including the daily paper Die Welt and the Sunday paper Welt am Sonntag.

Construction on the company headquarters in Hamburg began in 1950 and was completed in 1956.

In 1956, Axel Springer secured a blocking minority in Ullstein Verlag, and three years later he took over the company completely.

ullstein bild is a brand for the photo collection (since 1877), now under Axel Springer Syndication GmbH.

This was followed in 1959 by the purchase of the newspaper Berliner Morgenpost. When Springer took over the Ullstein publishing house in December 1959, the B.Z. also became its property.

Two days before the end of the Soviet ultimatum in Berlin, Axel Springer laid the foundation stone for the new publishing headquarters on 25 May 1959.

=== 1960s ===
The official opening of the Berlin headquarters took place in 1966.

After the attack on the student leader Rudi Dutschke on 11 April 1968, the APO (Extra-Parliamentary Opposition) began acts of violence against the company. The APO had a history of animosity with the Springer Group's allegedly biased coverage of the student movement. For instance, in the wake of the killing of Benno Ohnesorg by the police at a student demonstration against the Shah, one Springer paper reported that "what happened yesterday in Berlin had nothing to do with politics …. It was criminal in the most sickening way." In fact, Ohnesorg, who had never attended a demonstration before, had been shot in the back while trying to leave the demonstration.

=== 1970s ===
The years 1972 and 1973 saw the building of the offset-printing plant in Essen-Kettwig.

=== 1980s ===
1984 witnessed the official opening of the offset printing facility in Ahrensburg near Hamburg.

In 1985, 49% of the company was offered for public subscription, marking the IPO of Axel Springer. Later that year, Axel Springer died; control of the company was transferred to his widow Friede Springer.

In 1986, the first licensed edition of Auto Bild came out, in Italy. Other licensed editions and joint venture publications later appeared in twenty European countries, Indonesia and Thailand.

=== 1990s ===
In 1993, there was the official opening of the offset printing works in Berlin-Spandau.

In May 1999, Axel Springer bought a 51% majority stake in the American television production company GRB Entertainment, but was later divested in 2002.

=== 2000s ===
In 2001, Axel Springer and T-Online established a joint subsidiary Bild.de/T-Online AG. A year later in 2002, the launch of immonet.de took place, Mathias Doepfner, former editor-in-chief of Die Welt, became CEO of Axel Springer AG, and Giuseppe Vita became Chairman of the Supervisory Board, serving until 2019. Then in 2003, the name was changed to Axel Springer AG.

In 2009, Axel Springer AG acquired affiliate marketers Zanox and Digital Window as well as StepStone ASA.

=== 2010s ===
In 2010 a $635.7 million offer by Axel for leading French real estate website operator seloger.com caused seloger shares to rise as much as 32%, the most since it went public. Within 3 days Axel increased its offer 15.6% to $735 million after shareholders rejected the deal.

In 2012, Axel Springer formed a joint venture (Axel Springer Digital Classified) with global growth equity firm General Atlantic. The company also bought TotalJobs in the UK from Reed Elsevier that year.

In 2013, Springer sold its regional newspapers, women's magazines, and television magazines to Funke Mediengruppe for €920 million That same year, Publications Grand Public, a French magazine publisher owned by Springer, was sold to Reworld Media. The German television newsbroadcaster N24 was acquired by Axel Springer SE and combined with Die Welt.

=== 2020–present ===
In 2020, Friede Springer transferred $1.5 billion of Axel Springer shares to CEO Mathias Dopfner, effectively making him heir of the media group. Under the arrangement, Friede Springer sold a 4.1% stake to Dopfner and gifted him 15% more- bringing Dopfner's direct stake of the company to 22%. She also transferred voting rights to Dopfner for her remaining 22% in the business. In October of the same year, the company expanded its Berlin headquarters with the completion of the Axel Springer Campus, a cube-shaped office building designed by Rem Koolhaas and OMA.

In October 2021, an article in The New York Times reported accusations of sexual misconduct, sexual discrimination and questionable business practices at Axel Springer SE. A day later, the publisher fired the editor-in-chief of Bild.

In April 2025, the group separated its digital classifieds operations StepStone and Aviv, keeping its media assets, including Politico, Business Insider, Bild, and Die Welt. Friede Springer and Mathias Döpfner together took 95% ownership of Axel Springer SE, with 5% owned by Axel Sven Springer, a grandson of Axel Springer, and the Friede Springer Foundation. KKR and CPP Investments divested from Axel Springer and took majority onwnership of the classified businesses, with Axel Springer holding 10% of each. The deal valued the core media business at €3.5bn and the classifieds businesses at €10bn.

In June 2026, the company acquired the British newspaper company Telegraph Media Group in a deal estimated at £575 million.

== Acquisitions ==
=== Business Insider ===
In September 2015, Axel Springer acquired Business Insider at a $442 million valuation. It purchased an additional 88% of the company for $343 million, bringing its total ownership to 97%.

=== Morning Brew ===
In October 2020, Axel Springer and Insider Inc. acquired Morning Brew, a media startup that focuses on business newsletters and podcasts, for around $75 million. The Morning Brew brand remains fully intact post-deal, and the business will operate completely independently with Insider Inc. The company's co-founders retain a sizeable minority stake and have an earn-out clause built into the deal.

=== Politico ===
In October 2021, the firm announced that it had completed the acquisition of Politico for over $1 billion, after announcing its intention to do so in late August 2021. Along with the deal, Axel Springer took full control of the Politico Europe partnership launched in 2014, as well as the technology news site Protocol, which was launched in 2020.

=== Telegraph ===
In March 2026, Axel Springer agreed to buy the Telegraph Media Group, the publisher of The Daily Telegraph, for a reported £575m.

=== Former acquisitions ===
The company previously held shares in aufeminin.com and buy.at. It was also a significant investor in the American digital media company Group Nine Media, before it was acquired by Vox Media in February 2022.

== Reception ==
=== Alleged pro-American bias ===
As of 2001, the Axel Springer SE named what it described as "solidarity with the libertarian values of the United States of America" as one of its core principles on its website. This stance led to criticism from scholars and independent observers regarding the company's reported alignment with American interests. Furthermore, an article in Foreign Policy has criticised Axel Springer SE for a history of compromising journalistic ethics to support right-wing causes, implying a longstanding pattern of bias in its publications.

Gudrun Kruip, a scholar associated with the Stiftung Bundespräsident-Theodor-Heuss-Haus, has criticised Axel Springer SE and its subsidiaries for exhibiting a pro-American stance, often omitting criticism of US foreign policy. This observation is backed by allegations made by two former CIA officers in an interview with The Nation, reporting that Axel Springer received $7 million from the CIA. The purpose of this funding, they allege, was to influence the publisher to align its editorial content with American geopolitical interests. Although no conclusive evidence has come to light, Springer's admission in his autobiography regarding the financial challenges faced at the outset of his publishing venture, suggesting the necessity of external funding for the company's rapid growth led Kruip to believe that the allegations of CIA financial support are credible.

=== Alleged editorial interference in Poland ===
In 2017, Mark Dekan of Ringier Axel Springer Polska expressed support for European unity and the role of free media in a letter to employees, amidst political debates in Poland. His comments, which included criticism of Jarosław Kaczyński, and highlighted the company's values and the importance of European integration, especially among younger Poles, was interpreted by critics as editorial interference.

=== Alleged sexual harassment ===
In March 2021, Der Spiegel reported accusations that the editor of Bild, Julian Reichelt, had promoted several young female employees in exchange for sex and sought to buy their silence before dismissing them. This was followed up by a similar report in the New York Times in October 2021. These allegations were investigated by Axel Springer, which initially supported Reichelt. However, following further scrutiny, the company ultimately decided to dismiss him.

=== Alleged Islamophobia ===
Liz Fekete criticized Axel Springer-owned Welt and Axel Springer CEO Mathias Döpfner in 2024 for what she considered anti-Muslim and anti-Palestinian bias, in particular their claim that Muslim immigrants are the main source of antisemitism. She also criticized the company for uncritically adopting Israel's talking points on the Middle East conflict, to the disadvantage of Palestinians.

Axel Springer has also been accused of making profits from illegal settlements in the Occupied Palestinian territories. Axel Springer's Israeli classified ads website Yad2 is the largest classifieds site in Israel. The website publishes real estate listings across Israel, including rental apartments and sales in Israeli settlements that are considered illegal under international law. While private users can use the website for free, business users have to pay and many a times these real estate brokers and agents are selling or renting properties in illegal settlements. German public broadcasting criticized Axel Springer in 2024 for taking their pro-Israel mission too far and that they therefore believe Palestinians and anyone who expresses criticism of Israel "must be discredited and then written against", especially criticizing it for a news report which doxed and discredited several pro-Palestinian student protesters.

=== Core Principles Pledge ===
Upon acquisition of Insider in 2015, and again in 2021 with Politico, Mathias Döpfner allegedly stated that staff would need to adhere to Axel Springer's principles, including support for a united Europe, "reconciliation between Germans and Jews", Israel's right to exist, and a free-market economy, and that staff who disagree with the principles "should not work for Axel Springer, very clearly". In an interview with the New York magazine, Döpfner emphasized that Axel Springer's commitment to these core principles, particularly the right of Israel to exist, stems from Germany's historical context rather than activism. He claimed that while Springer employees in Germany are required to support these values, American employees are not asked to sign such a pledge. He also insists that journalistic integrity remains paramount, clarifying that the company's stance does not equate to uncritical support of Israel, but recognizes its right to exist in light of historical threats. Axel Springer's stance on Israel was reiterated in April 2026, with internal notes and meetings revealing the extent to which employees were told they must adhere to this stance.

== Competitors ==
Major competitors in the German publishing market include Bauer Media Group, Bertelsmann, Hubert Burda Media, and Holtzbrinck. On a global scale, some of the key competitors of Axel Springer include other large multinational media companies such as News Corporation, Time Warner, and The New York Times Company. These companies operate in a variety of different media sectors, including print, television, and digital, and are all major players in the global media industry. In addition to traditional media companies, Axel Springer also competes with a number of digital media platforms and companies, such as Google, Facebook, and Apple, which have become increasingly influential in the media industry in recent years. These companies have disrupted the traditional media business model by offering new ways for people to access news and information, and have posed a significant challenge to traditional media companies like Axel Springer.

== See also ==
- Brill
- Concentration of media ownership
- Protests of 1968
