= Informationsgemeinschaft zur Feststellung der Verbreitung von Werbeträgern =

- Headquarters: Berlin

The Informationsgemeinschaft zur Feststellung der Verbreitung von Werbeträgern (IVW) (lit. 'Information Community for the Assessment of the Circulation of Media'), comparable to the Audit Bureau of Circulation, certifies and audits the circulations of major publications, including newspapers and magazines within Germany.

Since the IVW was founded on November 4, 1949, the testing association has continuously expanded its control activities and adapted its individual test procedures to the new requirements of the advertising market. It was founded by the publishers in cooperation with the Central Association of the German Advertising Industry (ZAW). The IVW is a sub-organization of the ZAW, but has been legally independent since 1955. The Chairman of the IVW is the President of the ZAW. Today (as of 2006) the IVW collects and controls distribution data for almost the entire range of advertising media in Germany.

== See also ==
- Newspaper circulation
- International Federation of Audit Bureaux of Circulations
  - Audit Bureau of Circulations (disambiguation)
  - Audit Bureau of Circulations (UK)
- IVW pixel
