= List of magazines in France =

In France there are many magazines which are mostly literary magazines, women's magazines and news magazines. One of the early literary magazines, Nouvelles de la république des lettres, was launched by Pierre Bayle in France in 1684. In 1996 there were 2,761 magazine titles. As of 2004 the total number of magazines increased to 4,500. The same year consumer magazines sold about 641,000 copies and business magazines sold nearly 219,000 copies in France.

The following is an incomplete list of current and defunct magazines published in France. They are published in French or other languages.

== 0-9 ==
- 20 Ans
- 2512
- 30 millions d'amis

== A ==
- Abu Naddara
- Acéphale
- L'Aérophile
- The Africa Report
- Les Ailes
- Almanach des Muses
- Alternatives économiques
- Amina
- L'Anarchie
- L'Ancien d'Algérie
- Les Annales du Théâtre et de la Musique
- Arbeiter-Illustrierte-Zeitung
- L'Arche
- L'Architecture d'Aujourd'hui
- L'Architecture Vivante
- Argile
- L'Art culinaire
- Artistic Japan
- ArTitudes
- L'Assiette au Beurre
- L'Atelier du roman
- Auto Moto
- Automobile Year
- L'Autre Afrique
- Avantages

== B ==
- Basket News

== C ==
- Cabinet des Modes
- Cahiers d'art
- Cahiers du Cinéma
- Cahiers Octave Mirbeau
- Les Cahiers de la photographie
- Cahiers pour l'Analyse
- Les Cahiers du Sud
- La Caricature (1830–1843)
- La Caricature (1880–1904)
- Le Censeur
- Challenges
- Le Charivari
- Charlie Hebdo
- Charlie Mensuel
- Le Chasseur français
- Cibles
- Cinémagazine
- Cinémonde
- Ciné-Mondial
- Cénit
- Clara
- Classica
- La Clochette
- Clubic
- Cocorico
- Confidentiel
- Le Courrier français (1884–1914)
- Le Courrier français (1948–1950)
- Le Courrier graphique
- Le Crapouillot
- Le Cri de Paris
- Cuadernos
- La Cuisinière Cordon Bleu

== D ==
- Le Débat
- Défense de l'Occident
- Delo truda
- Derrière le miroir
- Deutsch–Französische Jahrbücher
- Diapason
- Dionée
- Do Not Look at the Sun
- Documents
- Le Droit des femmes

== E ==
- L'Écho des savanes
- L'Éclipse
- L'Écran fantastique
- Les Écrits nouveaux
- Éléments
- Elle
- Energy Technology Perspectives
- L'Esprit Nouveau
- L'Estampe Moderne
- L'Estampe originale
- L'Étudiant noir
- Europe
- Europe-Action
- Europe Échecs
- L'Europe orientale
- The European
- L'Express

== F ==
- Famille chrétienne
- Femina
- La Femme
- Femme Actuelle
- Femmes françaises
- Le Figaro Magazine
- Le Film français
- Le Follet
- France-Amérique
- France Football
- La Fraternité, Journal moral et politique

== G ==
- Gazette des Beaux-Arts
- Gazette du Bon Ton
- Giustizia e Libertà
- Les Grandes Aventures
- La Guerre Sociale

== H ==
- Hayal
- L'Histoire
- L'Humanité Dimanche

== I ==
- Ici Paris
- L'Illustration
- L'Indépendance arabe
- L'Industrie Vélocipédique
- L'Infini
- L'Intelligence
- L'Intermédiaire des chercheurs et curieux
- Investir

== J ==
- Jazz Hot
- Jazz Magazine
- Je sais tout
- Jeune Afrique
- La Jeune Belgique
- Journal amusant
- Journal des Dames
- Journal des dames et des modes
- Journal of Film Preservation
- Jours de France
- Joystick

== K ==
- Al Karmel
- Khamsin
- Kultura

== L ==
- La Licorne
- Lire
- L'Officiel
- L'Officiel Hommes
- Lui
- Lyon Capitale
- Lys rouge

== M ==
- Mad Movies
- Madame Figaro
- Le Magazin pittoresque
- Marianne (magazine: 1932-1940)
- Marianne
- Marie Claire
- Max
- Le Ménestrel
- La mère éducatrice
- Merlin
- Meşveret
- Midi Minuit Fantastique
- Mieux Vivre Votre Argent
- MilK Magazine
- Minotaure
- Mirage
- La Mode Illustrée
- Le Moderniste Illustré
- Modes & Travaux
- Monde (review)
- Monde dramatique
- Le Monde de l'éducation
- Le Monde libertaire
- Le Monde mensuel
- Le Monde de la musique
- Le Moniteur des travaux publics et du bâtiment

== N ==
- Le Nain jaune
- La Nation française
- Le Navire d'Argent
- Noi donne
- Notre Temps
- Le Nouveau Détective
- Le Nouvel Économiste
- Le Nouveau Magazine Littéraire
- Nouvelle École
- Nouvelle Revue Française
- La Nouvelle Vie Ouvrière
- Les Nouvelles littéraires
- La Nouvelle Revue d'Histoire

== O ==
- Objectif et action Mutualistes
- L'Obs
- L'ŒIL
- Onze Mondial
- L'Organisateur

== P ==
- Pariscope
- Paris Match
- Paris Passion
- Le Particulier
- La Petite Illustration
- Pilote
- Pleine Vie
- Le Point
- Pour Vous
- Positif
- Présence Africaine
- Preuves
- Prima
- Psychologies

== Q ==
- Questions féministes

== R ==
- La Révolution prolétarienne
- La Revue Blanche
- Revue et gazette musicale de Paris
- La Revue hebdomadaire
- Revue d'histoire du fascisme
- Revue d'Histoire littéraire de la France
- Revue Illustrée
- La Revue du mois
- La Revue musicale
- Revue du monde musulman
- Revue Noire
- Revue de l'Orient Latin
- Revue politique et littéraire
- La Revue du vin de France
- La Revue wagnérienne
- Rivarol
- Russian Riviera

== S ==
- Science & Vie
- Sciences et Avenir
- La Semaine de Suzette
- Society
- Les Soirées de Paris
- Les Spectacles de Paris
- La Stratégie
- Studio magazine
- Şûrâ-yı Ümmet
- Le Surrealisme au service de la revolution

== T ==
- Tel Quel
- Télé 7 Jours
- Télé Poche
- Le Téméraire
- Les Temps modernes
- Têtu
- Tilt
- Tsugi
- TV Magazine

== U ==
- L'Univers illustré
- Al-Urwah al-Wuthqa
- L'Usine nouvelle

== V ==
- Verve
- La Vie
- La Vie Parisienne
- Vogue France
- Voici
- La volonté de paix

== W ==
- The Wipers Times

== Y ==
- L'Ymagier

== See also ==
- List of newspapers in France
