= Hayal (disambiguation) =

Hayal is an Ottoman satirical magazine published between 1873 and 1895. Iy may also refer to:

- Hayal (name), list of people with the name
- Hayal Pass, high mountain pass in Pakistan
- A'mâk-ı Hayâl, novel by Ahmad Hilmi of Filibe
- Bank Otsar Ha-Hayal, Israeli bank
- Brit HaHayal, Revisionist Zionist association in Poland
- Bhura Hayal, village in Pakistan
