= Femmes solidaires =

Women's movement in France

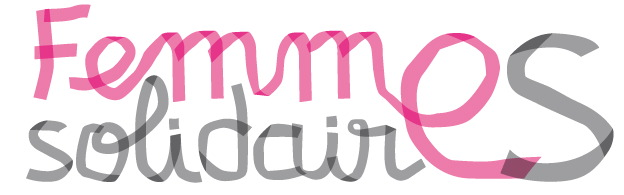
- Logo of Femmes Solidaires
- Predecessor: Union des femmes française
- Formation: June 17, 1945; 81 years ago
- Founder: Eugénie Cotton, Marie-Claude Vaillant-Couturier, Yvonne Dumont
- Location: Paris, France
- Official language: French
- President: Sabine Salmon
- Main organ: Femmes françaises (1944-1957)
- Website: https://femmes-solidaires.org
- Formerly called: Union des femmes françaises

Femmes solidaires (French pronunciation: [fam sɔlidɛʁ], "Women in solidarity") is a French feminist organisation in France, founded during the Second World War under the name Union des femmes françaises (UFF). The movement works for the defense and advancement of women's rights, gender equality, the liberal movement and international solidarity.

== Underground origins ==
The origins of Femmes solidaires date to 1941, in the grass roots women's committees of the French Resistance, created by Danielle Casanova. These women's committees gradually took shape at local levels, then at the regional and inter-regional level. They were regrouped within the Union des femmes françaises in the zone occupée and the Union des femmes de France in the zone libre. Following the arrest of Danielle Casanova and Marcelle Barjonet, the leaders in the northern zone were Josette Dumeix, then Maria Rabaté with Simone Bertrand taking the lead in the southern zone libre.

The UFF was consolidated around 1943 within the communist resistance movement during the occupation of France by Nazi Germany. This organisation took a long time to establish itself, mainly due to arrests of its members by the Nazis or by the French Vichy regime.

In April 1944, the Francs-Tireurs et Partisans asked the UFF for help with its auxiliary services, requesting their members act as intelligence or liaison officers or as quartermasters. A steering committee composed of Yvonne Dumont, Françoise Leclercq, Irène Joliot-Curie, and Eugénie Cotton met on June 11 to evaluate the proposal. The UFF became a nationwide movement, which then applied to the National Council of the Resistance for recognition.

== Formalisation after liberation ==
Before liberation, all of the individual committees had been unified by the French Communist Party (PCF) under the name of Union des femmes françaises pour la Zone nord (the Union of French Women for the northern Zone) and the Union des femmes françaises pour la Zone nord et d'Union des femmes de France de la Zone sud (Union of French Women for the southern Zone).

After liberation, they merged and were formally registered under the name "Union des femmes françaises", becoming one of the main organisations of the PCF, and became official at a congress on 21 December 1944.

== Post-war ==
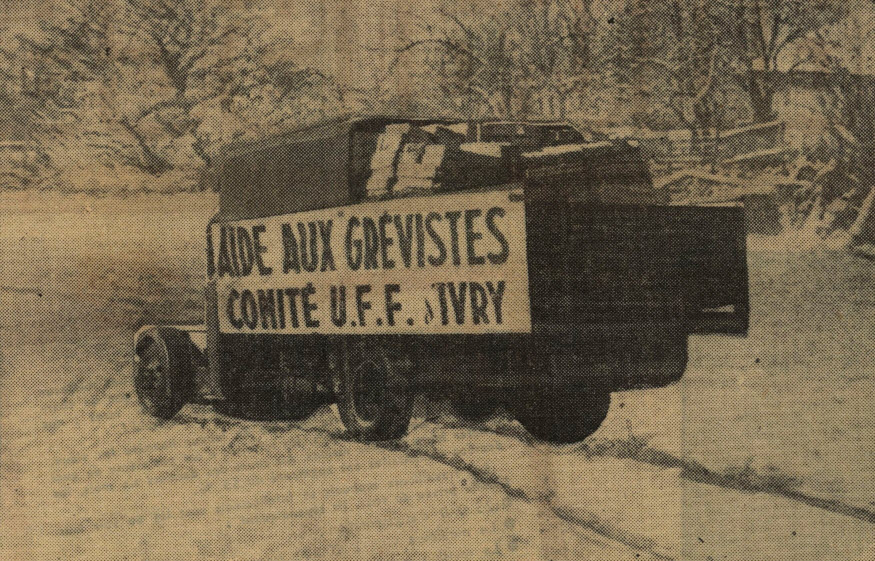
UFF-chartered supply truck, December 1947

After the Liberation and during the Cold War years, Femmes solidaires was a "Communist mass-movement organisation" led by Jeannette Vermeersch and Claudine Chomat. Their magazine Femmes françaises was a key communication tool during that era.

== Principles and objectives ==
Femmes solidaires is a national feminist movement of popular education made up of more than 190 local associations, established throughout France and its overseas departments.

The organisation's founding values are based on secularism, social diversity (:fr:mixité sociale), equal rights for women, peace, and freedom. It currently has almost 30,000 members and publishes the monthly Clara Magazine. Its social objectives were to combat all forms of discrimination and domination, particularly in the fields of employment rights, equality between men and women in the workplace, parity, and the fight against violence against women.

Femmes solidaires has special consultative status with the Economic and Social Council of the United Nations. The association is also involved in international solidarity campaigns and works with numerous feminist organisations in different countries around the world.

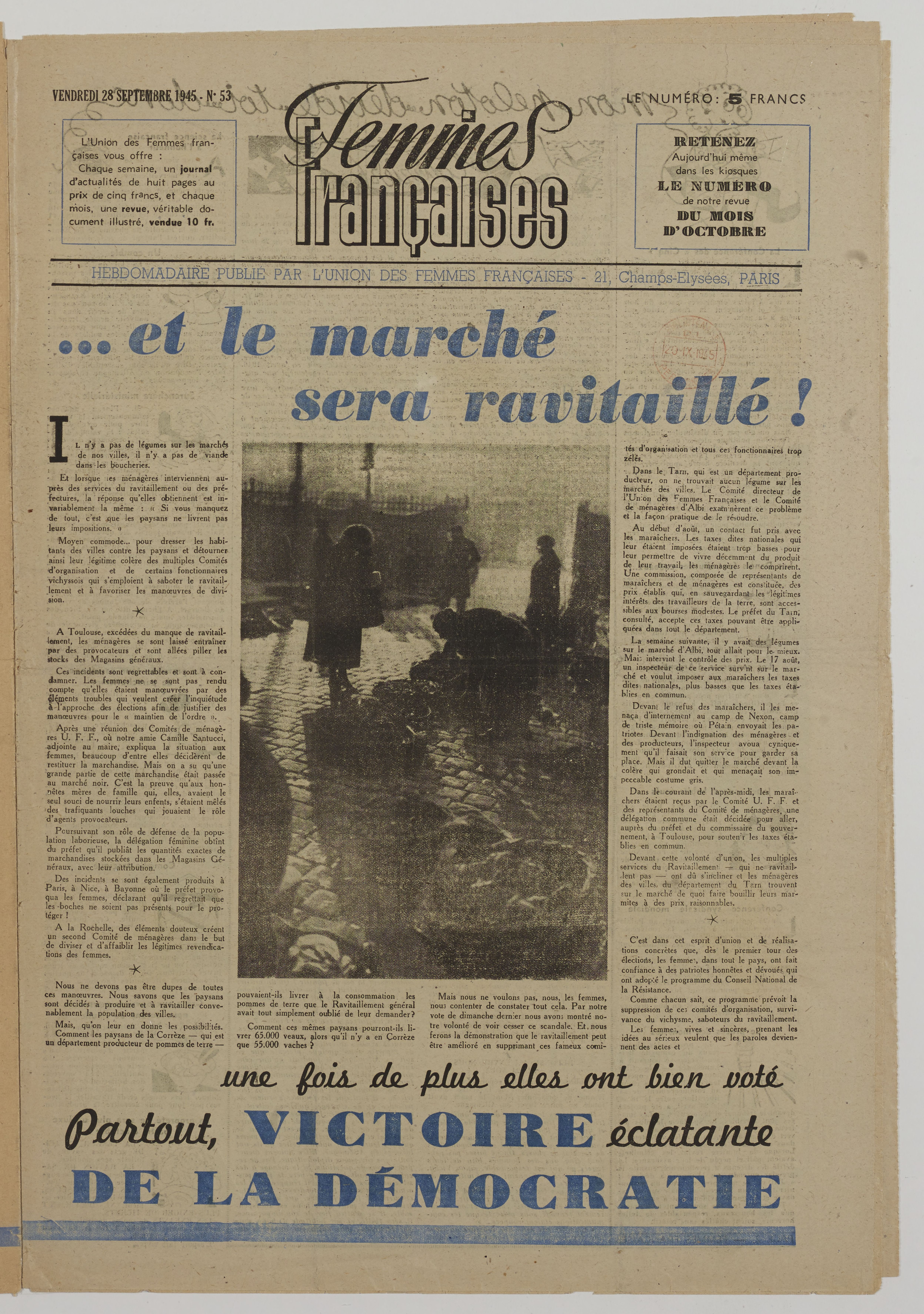
Front page of Femmes françaises, weekly magazine for women

== See also ==
- Angèle Chevrin
- Simone de Beauvoir
- Feminism in France
- French Resistance
- Housewives demonstrations
- Second wave feminism
- Vichy France

== Works cited ==
- Femmes françaises (6 June 1947). "Les paysans envoient du ravitaillement pour les travailleurs en lutte et leurs familles" [Farmers send supplies to workers and their families in the struggle]. Gallica (in French). France d'abord.
- BNF (2 May 2023) [31 May 1988]. "Union des femmes françaises | BnF Catalogue générale - Bibliothèque nationale de France". BNF. FRBNF12076018.
- Girault, Jacques; Loiseau, Dominique (2023). "BERTRAND Simone, Séraphine". maitron.fr..
- Guéraiche, William (1999). Les femmes et la République: essai sur la répartition du pouvoir de 1943 à 1979 (in French). Editions de l'Atelier. ISBN 978-2-7082-3468-0.
- Loiseau, Dominique (2018). "L'Union des femmes françaises pendant les Trente Glorieuses: entre 'maternalisme', droit des femmes et communisme" [The French Women's Union during the Trente Glorieuses: between 'maternalism', women's rights and communism]. Le Mouvement Social (in French). 4 (265).
- Loiseau, Dominique; Pennetier, Claude (2023). "BARJONET Marcelle, épouse HURAUX". maitron.fr (in French).
- Naquet, Emmanuel Naquet (2004). "Ligues et associations". In Becker, Jean-Jacques; Candar, Gilles (dir.) (eds.). Histoire des gauches en France [History of the left-wing parties in France]. Vol. 2. Paris: La Découverte.
- Sapiro, Gisèle (2004). "Brassard de l'Union des femmes françaises - Île-de-France". museedelaresistanceenligne.org.
