= France et Ukraine =

French Socio-political Weekly Newspaper

- France et Ukraine, 5 March 1920 issue
- Type: Weekly
- Format: Broadsheet
- Editor-in-chief: F. Savchenko
- Founded: 9 January 1920
- Ceased publication: 7 May 1920
- Headquarters: 11 Rue de Bassano, 16th arr., Paris
- City: Paris
- Country: France
- Circulation: 8,000 (as of 1920)

France et Ukraine ('France and Ukraine') was a French language socio-political broadsheet weekly newspaper published from Paris between January and May 1920. The first issue was published on 9 January 1920, the last (14th) being published on 7 May 1920.

The initiative to launch the newspaper was taken by the Circle for French-Ukrainian Studies, a group founded in July 1918 by F. Savchenko, and the Extraordinary Diplomatic Mission of the Ukrainian People's Republic in France. France et Ukraine was sponsored by the Ministry of Foreign Affairs of the Ukrainian People's Republic, whose subsidies constituted the main revenue source for the publication. The newspaper reached a circulation of around 8,000. Savtchenko served as editor-in-chief, whilst the managing editors were M. Houtain, E. Houtain and H. Bontoux. The editorial office was located on Rue de Bassano in the 16th arrondissement of Paris. It shared its offices with Bulletin d’informations du Bureau Ukrainien de Presse, L’Europe orientale and Ukrayinska Respublika.

The publication advocated for strengthening Franco-Ukrainian relations, with emphasis on the notion of supporting Ukraine as constituent of the cordon sanitaire against Bolshevism. Contributors to France et Ukraine included Savchenko, M. Kouchnire, V. Tymoshenko, Andre Serbinenko, Symon Petliura, I. Borshak, B. Boutenko, Michel Rudnitsky, Serge Cheloukhine, A.Loukachevitch, K. Vychevitch, Georges Bienaimé, Georges Géo-Gérald (French parliamentarian), Armand Sylvestre, Roland Derbly, Albert de Gobart, H. de Harzy, Helie d’Arnaval, Charles Dubreuil, Francois Tessier and Philippe de Caldhilhe. N. Loutchinsky was the correspondent of the newspaper in Rome.

The newspaper closed down due to the financial difficulties of the Extraordinary Diplomatic Mission of the Ukrainian People's Republic in France. There was a long gap between the 13th issue, published on 2 April 1920, and the 14th, published on 7 May 1920.
