= Aurier =

Aurier is a surname. Notable people with the surname include:

- Albert Aurier (1865–1892), French poet, art critic, and painter
- Serge Aurier (born 1992), Ivorian footballer
