= Hayal (name) =

- Gender: Female
- Language: Turkish

Origin
- Meaning: Dream

Hayal is a feminine given name of Turkish origin. In Turkish, the word "hayal" means "dream".

== Etymology ==
The word is derived from the Arabic word "Khayal"(خَيَال). Notable people with the name are as follows:

== People ==
=== Given name ===
- Hayal Köksal (born 1956), Turkish instructor
- Hayal Köseoğlu (born 1992), Turkish actress and musical artist
- Hayal Pozanti (born 1983), Turkish-American artist

=== Surname ===
- Yasin Hayal (born 1981), Turkish criminal

== See also ==
- Hayal (disambiguation)
