= Naguib Azoury =

Naguib Azoury or Negib Azoury (Arabic: نجيب عازوري, romanized: Najīb ʿĀzūrī; c. 1870–1916) was a Maronite Christian who espoused Arab nationalist ideals, most notably in the book Le Réveil de la nation arabe.

== Early life and education ==
The details of Azoury's birth are uncertain. According to one source, Azoury was born around 1873 in the village of Azour. He studied in Paris at the École des sciences politiques and later studied at the Ottoman civil service school in Constantinople. In 1898, Azoury began administration work in Jerusalem, serving as an Ottoman official for several years.

== Activities after Jerusalem ==
In May 1904, following a conflict with his brother-in-law and Jerusalem's Mutasarrif Kazim Bey, Azoury went to Cairo and condemned the mutasarrif in the newspaper al-Ikhlas.

Azoury moved to Paris and allegedly founded the Ligue de la Patrie arabe; as of December 1904 and January 1905, this organization included only Azoury and another person. Later, Azoury was sentenced to death "in absentia ... for having left his post without permission and having proceeded to Paris where he [had] devoted himself to acts compromising the existence of the [Ottoman] Empire."

In December 1904 and January 1905, Azoury's Ligue released two manifestos, both titled "The Arab Countries for the Arabs" and published in Arabic and French. The Ligue directed its first manifesto to "all the citizens of the Arab homeland subjected to the Turks"; the second manifesto addressed the "enlightened and humanitarian nations of Europe and North America". These manifestos preceded Azoury's most well-known text, Le Réveil de la nation arabe.

== Le Réveil de la nation arabe ==
In January 1905, soon after the Ligue issued its manifestos, Azoury published Le Réveil de la nation arabe dans l'Asie turque—or, more commonly, Le Réveil de la nation arabe (The Awakening of the Arab Nation). Le Réveil de la nation arabe, Azoury's most significant work, has been termed "a minor classic in Arab nationalist literature".

=== Key ideas and influences ===
Le Réveil included a comprehensive discussion of the relationships between the Ottoman Empire and the world powers. Most significantly, Azoury openly urged the Arab provinces to sever their ties with the Ottoman Empire. In addition to the text's nationalistic nature, Le Réveil exhibited anti-Zionist sentiment and decried Zionist aspirations in Palestine. Azoury envisaged “that Zionist and Arab nationalist aspirations were likely to come seriously into conflict,” writing that "two important phenomena are emerging at this moment in Asiatic Turkey. They are the awakening of the Arab Nation and the latent effort by Jews to reconstitute on a very large scale the ancient Kingdom of Israel... They are destined to fight each other continually until one of them wins." He also criticized what he viewed as French anti-clerical actions in Jerusalem and Lebanon.

Some assert that the text was likely heavily influenced by Azoury's career in the service of the Ottoman Empire. Azoury had firsthand experience of corrupt administrators as well as the flawed system that could not stem the arrival of Jewish immigrants or their acquisition of land.

=== Reception and criticism ===
Azoury largely wrote Le réveil for French readers; in fact, the book was written in French. The book apparently was not initially influential among Arabs, but it did spark dialogue in Europe and especially in France. European officials considered Le réveil an important text for gaining insight to the region, and the book is credited with encouraging European aspirations regarding the Ottoman Empire by “[claiming] that the Arab provinces were ripe for revolt, and that a movement already existed that needed only the assent of Europe to bring about the final confrontation.” Yet, Azoury admitted later “that the book sought not to describe Arab discontent so much as to create it.” The work is criticized as being a falsely nationalistic text, intended to pander to Europe rather than to rouse Arab nationalistic sentiment.

One year after Le réveil’s publication, Farid Kassab—an Arab from Beirut who was attending school in Paris—criticized Azoury’s work, writing a pamphlet that supported the Ottoman Empire and Jewish settlement in Palestine while rejecting Azoury’s idea of an Arab nation.

== Later life ==
In April 1907, while still in Paris, Azoury published the first monthly issue of L'Indépendance arabe. In order to secure funding for the publication, Azoury offered to place his knowledge of North Africa, the various pan-Islamic committees, and the regional political “web” at the service of France. Azoury was investigated at this point by uneasy French authorities, but he was largely dismissed as posing no danger. During their investigation, French authorities found no definitive evidence supporting the existence of Azoury's Ligue de la patrie arabe—for which, along with a similarly dubious Arab national committee, Azoury claimed to speak.
