= Diyojen =

Ottoman era satirical magazine (1870–1873)

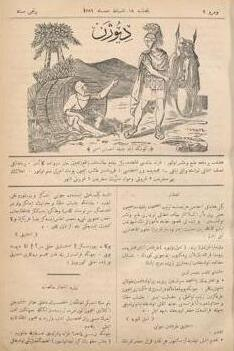
- Editor: Teodor Kasap
- Categories: Satire
- Frequency: Weekly
- Founder: Teodor Kasap
- First issue: 24 November 1870
- Final issue: 1873
- Country: Ottoman Empire
- Based in: Istanbul
- Language: Ottoman Turkish
- Website: nbn-resolving.de/urn:nbn:de:hbz:5:1-74434%20Diyojen

Diyojen (“Diogenes“) was the first Ottoman satirical magazine of the Ottoman Empire. The first issue was published in Istanbul on 24 November 1870 by the satirist Teodor Kasap (1835-1905). The caricatures published in Diyojen appeared without signs of the artists. It came out weekly in three year's issues and was banned for good in 1873 after 183 numbers. Apart from satirical pieces, the magazine became known for its caricatures and the translation of French literature. Kasap, who also worked as journalist and playwright, published other satirical magazines after the ban. In Hayal (“Fantasy” or “Illusion“), which existed from 1873 until 1877, he among other things used caricatures and satirical articles to criticize the arbitrary press law.
