= Theodoros Kasapis =

Ottoman Greek newspaper editor and educator

- Greek: Θεόδωρος Κασάπης
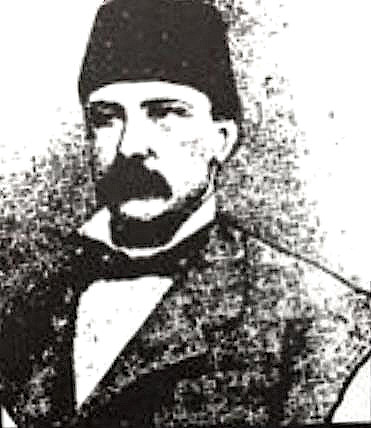
- A lithograph of Theodoros Kasapis
- Born: 10 November 1835; Kayseri, Anatolia, Ottoman Empire
- Died: 5 June 1897 (aged 61); Istanbul, Ottoman Empire

Theodoros Kasapis (Greek: Θεόδωρος Κασάπης, Turkish: Teodor Kasap) (10 November 1835–5 June 1897) was an Ottoman Greek newspaper editor and educator.

== Biography ==
He was born on November 10, 1835, in Kayseri, in central Anatolia. He studied in Paris and worked for about seven years as a personal secretary to the French novelist Alexandre Dumas. He taught French in various schools in Istanbul and then in the Imperial School of Artillery. He also worked as an editor of the French newspaper Étoile d'Orient.

In February 1870, he issued in French, the weekly satirical newspaper Le Diogene, then in Greek as Ο Διογένης (O Diogenis) and subsequently in Turkish as Diyojen. Another publication which Kasapis issued was the newspaper Çingirakli Tatar in Turkish and in Greek. Then he proceeded with the issuance of the Momos ("Blemish") and the Turkish Hayal ("Vision"). While Momos and Hayal faced repeated prohibitions, Kasapis proceeded to issue the Turkish daily newspaper İstikbal ("Future") in August 1875. Its purpose was to prepare the ground for the constitutional system in the Ottoman Empire. He was persecuted for this and had to fled to Europe in 1877. A few years later he was pardoned, and on his return was appointed as a librarian in the palace. He retained this position until his death on 5 June 1897 in Istanbul, although many sources give 1905 as his death year.
