= Aazour =

Aazour عازور 'Azour
- Municipality
- Location in Lebanon
- Coordinates: 33°33′35″N 35°32′04″E
- Country: Lebanon
- Governorate: South Governorate
- District: Jezzine District
- Elevation: 2,720 ft (830 m)
- Time zone: UTC+2 (EET)
  - Summer (DST): +3

Aazour (Arabic: عازور, romanized: ʿĀzūr) is a municipality in Lebanon, located 22 km (14 mi) from Sidon and 63 km (39 mi) south of Beirut. It is 830 meters above sea level. Aazour's area stretches for 263 hectares (2.63 km^{2}; 1.01518 mi^{2}).

The municipality of Aazour is located in the Kaza of Jezzine, one of the eight mohafazats (governorates) of Lebanon.

== History ==
In 1838, Eli Smith noted 'Azur as a village by Jezzin, "East of et-Tuffa".

== Demographics ==
In 2014, Christians made up 98.85% of registered voters in Aazour. 85.96% of the voters were Maronite Catholics.

The village population is around 1306. The majority of this population is settled in Beirut and its suburbs and treat the village as a summer destination to get away from the heat and bustle of the capital.

=== Families ===
The major family name in Aazour is Aazouri عازوري and Aoun عون (spelled also Aazoury). All Lebanese with the Azoury family originate from the village of Azour. They are also distributed around the world, mainly Canada, United States of America, Brazil, Dubai and Mexico.

== Notable people ==
- Naguib Azoury
- Jihad Azour

== Bibliography ==
- Robinson, E.; Smith, E. (1841). Biblical Researches in Palestine, Mount Sinai and Arabia Petraea: A Journal of Travels in the year 1838. Vol. 3. Boston: Crocker & Brewster.

== See also ==
http://www.azour.net/

http://www.localiban.org/spip.php?article3768

http://www.baldati.com/
