= Vincent Krassousky =

French cartoonist (1902–1948)

- Born: 22 July 1902; Kyiv, Russian Empire
- Died: 31 May 1948 (aged 45); Paris, France
- Occupation: Cartoonist
- Known for: Publishing pro-Axis propaganda for children

Vincent Krassousky (22 July 1902 – 31 May 1948) was a Ukrainian cartoonist who immigrated to France as a refugee. Krassousky's character, Vica, was a sailor, and Vica was also Krassousky's nickname. He is known chiefly for publishing pro-Axis propaganda cartoons for children during the Nazi occupation of France.

== History ==
In 1902 he was born in Kyiv, then in the Russian Empire. He fought with the White Russians during the 1917 Bolshevik Revolution, doing so from the ages of 16 and 18. According to a doctor who examined him as part of a criminal trial, his father died in Bulgaria during the war, he had a negative attitude towards Communist Bolsheviks and that they had killed his mother and sister. Claire Tufts, author of "Vincent Krassousky - Nazi Collaborator or Naïve Cartoonist?", noted that he considered the Soviets responsible for the deaths of his loved ones, he had "an intense, visceral hatred of the Russians" that others in France were aware of. He never fathered children and had not married.

His first commercial artwork was an advertisement for the breakfast drink Banania made in 1933, and he began his Vica comics in a Belgian publication in 1935. He also wrote "The Extraordinary Adventures of Bib and Bob" from the beginning to the middle of 1936, published in Paris-Soir Dimanche.

Krassousky stayed in Paris after the Nazi forces invaded Paris in 1940. He never worked for publishing companies in the area not directly occupied by Nazi Germany, so Tufts stated that "it is not surprising" that Krassousky did not move. Vica comics were published in Gavroche from 1940, until 1942, and then from January 1943 in Le Téméraire, a comics publication for children that aligned with the Axis; as part of the latter Krassousky wrote some comics supporting the Nazi German cause. In the comics the character Vica, in Alaniz's words, "mocked and excoriated England, America, the Bolsheviks, and "Jewish conspiracies."" Claire Tufts stated that the Krassousky comics were "far less offensive" compared to other Le Téméraire comics. Le Téméraire ended on 1 August 1944.

According to Alaniz, the author "may have been mentally deranged". Tufts stated that "[e]ven a cursory look" at the Vica comics made it clear that he "was much more than a naïve cartoonist living and working in Paris during the German occupation."

He was arrested in October 1944 after the liberation of France, and was accused of collaborating with Nazi authorities by making the comics, and was accused of having fascist sympathies by members of the public. He stated that he was innocent, and that a German cartoonist he worked with wrote and/or created the storylines, but he was convicted. He was given a prison sentence of one year and a 1,000 franc fine on 23 February 1945.

== Vica ==
The Vica comics starred Vica, a sailor described by José Alaniz, author of Komiks: Comic Art in Russia, as being similar to Popeye. Other characters were Tatave; Kamphara, an African character; and several anthropomorphic animal characters.

== Works ==
- Les aventures de Vica. Editions Gordinne, Liège. 1935.
- Vica au Pôle Nord. Studio André Teixier, 1935; réédition: Editions Gordinne, Liège. 1936.
- Poum Plum. Editions Gordinne, Liège. 1936.
- Vica au fond d'un volcan. Editions Gordinne, Liège. 1937.
- Vica fait de la peinture. Editions Gordinne, Liège. 1937.
- Me voici scaphandrier. Editions Gordinne, Liège. 1938.
- Histoire du joyeux Yabon le petit Négrillon, 1939.
- Vica au paradis de l'URSS ("Vica in the Paradise of the USSR"). Editions Dompol, 1942.
  - The comic portrays Madame Angleterre (Mrs. England) tormenting a bear representing Russia by injecting a virus with Vladimir Lenin and Joseph Stalin, and she is assisted by Leon Trotsky, who is a Jewish caricature. Tufts describes Madame Angleterre was an "old hag". The spread of Communism continues with the alliance of Jewish people, Soviet Union, and the United Kingdom. After Tatave decides to adopt Communist ideals, Vica comes to the Soviet Union but leaves only after being enslaved for a time. Vica tells Tatave that Soviet Russia had problems, but Tatave does not believe him. He takes Tatave to the "Le Bolchevisme contre l'Europe" (Bolshevism against Europe) exposition to watch "Au Paradis des Soviets", which documents poor conditions in the Communist Soviet Union. Tatave, now despising Stalin, angrily attacks the film screen.
- Vica contre le Service Secret Anglais ("Vica against the English Secret Service") (the title on the cover page is: Vica contre l'Intelligence Service. Editions Dompol, 1942.
  - Whilst on a spying mission, Vica travels to the United Kingdom and humiliates Winston Churchill after a fight, while Tatave does the same to Joseph Stalin. Krassousky uses his Vica character to criticize the British Empire, and this comic also discusses Anglo-French relations, stating that France is threatened by the alliance between Jewish people, the Soviet Union, and the United Kingdom. It also advocates for the construction of the Canal des Deux-Mers. The comic portrays Madame Angleterre and a Jewish caricatured agent working for her, and it shows her adding the Hammer and Sickle and the Star of David to the Union Jack. Vica, attempting to cure Madame Angleterre of the virus, attacks her. At the end of the story Vica and Tatave help build the Trans-Saharan Railway.
- Vica défie l'Oncle Sam ("Vica defies Uncle Sam"). Editions Coloniales et Métropolitaines, 1943.
  - In this comic Vica and Tatave use a telescope to see the situation in the United States. A Jewish advisor of United States President Franklin D. Roosevelt, Lévy, is described as "the spokesman for the American Jew". Roosevelt begins war preparation efforts, including releasing inmates at Sing Sing Prison to be used as soldiers, after Lévy encourages him to do so. First Lady of the United States Eleanor Roosevelt moves the Statue of Liberty away and stands in its place out of jealousy; Tufts stated that the comic shows the First Lady as "a frumpy old housewife". The comic states that German workers are happy while U.S. workers are unhappy and rioting. In addition the French ocean liner SS Normandie is destroyed in the harbor of New York after the U.S. military seizes it. Vica and Tatave travel to Sub-Saharan Africa and plant a cacti patch to foil the United States's war efforts. The U.S. invades North Africa, killing and enslaving locals. When the U.S. military moves south, Vica and Tatave force Uncle Sam out of his aircraft, and as he parachutes, he lands in the cacti patch they planted. Vica and Tatave consider Uncle Sam's defeat to be revenge for the loss of the SS Normandie.
- Pousse-Tout et Passe-Partout (under the pseudonym "Tim"), 1946.

== Notes ==
- Tufts, Clare (2004). "Vincent Krassousky-Nazi Collaborator or Naïve Cartoonist?" International Journal of Comic Art. Volume 6, Number 1. Spring 2004. pp. 18–36.
