= Eurobasket.com =

Website on basketball

- Available in: English
- Creator: Marek Wojtera
- Website: www.eurobasket.com
- Commercial: yes
- Registration: available, but not required
- Launched: March 1997
- Current status: active

Eurobasket.com, also commonly referred to as "Eurobasket News", is a basketball-centered website that provides coverage of every professional and semi-professional club basketball league from around the world, as well as many amateur level leagues. Although it is primarily focused on Europe's club basketball leagues, the website also hosts several different regional sections for Africa, Asia, Latin America and the Caribbean, Northern America, and Oceania. Eurobasket.com, which is updated on a daily basis, covers basketball in 196 different countries and in 435 different leagues around the world, with over 940,000 basketball player and basketball coach profiles. Between 2000 and 2001 it was renamed to Telebasket.com.

== History ==
Eurobasket.com is the most well-known website about international basketball coverage. Originally, it was established in 1995, as Euroster.com, in Canada, by Marek Wojtera. Wojtera, is a Polish immigrant, former basketball player, and a computer programmer. Two years later, in 1997, it changed its name to Eurobasket.com. In 2010, it was incorporated into the Hong Kong based web programming company Sports I.T. Solutions, and the two companies became partners in 2019.

== Overview ==
The site's news content is provided by its full-time staff, and over 100 sports media correspondents that are located around the world. Eurobasket.com is known as the source of the most complete basketball coverage and data collection about basketball. The site also hosts a database of over 940,000 basketball coaches and players, both active and retired, from around the world, with some of that content being accessible only through a paid subscription.

== Eurobasket Summer League ==
Eurobasket.com also operates the Eurobasket Summer League, which consists of annual three day basketball tournaments that take place in the United States. The summer league takes place in the five host venues of Atlanta, Chicago, Dallas, Las Vegas, and New York Metro Area, and also goes to the NCAA Women's Final Four. There are also European tours, where the players can be seen by more European scouts. The aim of the tournaments is to help unsigned free agents find professional basketball clubs overseas, and to that end, 767 former Eurobasket Summer League players were active on professional rosters, in 67 different countries during the 2019–20 basketball season. The summer league events, which cater to both men's and women's basketball players, have also hosted players from lesser known backgrounds, like players from NCAA Division III colleges for example. In order for the players to gain more exposure, the games are broadcast live on YouTube, and have received over 145,000 views since 2018.

== Related websites ==
Eurobasket.com's affiliated sections:

- Africa – Afrobasket.com
- Asia – Asia-basket.com
- Europe – Eurobasket.com
- Latin America and the Caribbean – Latinbasket.com
- Northern America – USbasket.com
- Oceania – Australiabasket.com
- Eurobasket Summer League – Eurobasketsummerleague.com
- Probasketballoverseas.com
- Sports Agents – Hoopsagents.com
- Youth Level – Youthbasket.com

== Eurobasket News Euro awards ==
The Eurobasket News Euro awards are annual sports awards that are given to the best basketball players and coaches that are playing and coaching on the European continent, across all European leagues and competitions, regardless of their nationalities. Awards are also given to the best basketball players in the world, that have European nationalities, regardless of whether they play in Europe, or anywhere else in the world. The awards are decided on by a vote that takes place among over 300 sports journalists that cover European basketball for the website.

=== Eurobasket News All-Europeans Player of the Year ===
The EuroBasket News All-Europeans Player of the Year award is given to the best basketball player in the world, in a given calendar year, that has European nationality, regardless of whether they play in Europe, or anywhere else in the world. For example, European players that play in the NBA, and other various leagues around the world that are not based in Europe, are eligible for the award. The award is decided on by a vote that takes place among over 300 sports journalists that cover international basketball for the website.

*	Inducted into the Naismith Memorial Basketball Hall of Fame
**	Inducted into the FIBA Hall of Fame
***	Inducted into both the Naismith and FIBA Halls of Fame

Player (X) Denotes the number of times the player has been selected.

- Nationalities listed by national team affiliation:

Year	Eurobasket News All-Europeans Player of the Year
2002	(Federal Republic of Yugoslavia) Peja Stojaković
2003	(Federal Republic of Yugoslavia) Peja Stojaković (2×)
2004	(Federal Republic of Yugoslavia) Peja Stojaković (3×)
2005	(Germany) Dirk Nowitzki*
2006	(Germany) Dirk Nowitzki* (2×)
2007	(Germany) Dirk Nowitzki* (3×)
2008	(Germany) Dirk Nowitzki* (4×)
2009	(Spain) Pau Gasol*
2010	(Spain) Pau Gasol* (2×)
2011	(Germany) Dirk Nowitzki* (5×)
2012	(Russia) Andrei Kirilenko
2013	(France) Tony Parker*
2014	(France) Tony Parker* (2×)
2015	(Spain) Pau Gasol* (3×)
2016	(Latvia) Kristaps Porziņģis
2017	(Slovenia) Goran Dragić
2018	(Greece) Giannis Antetokounmpo
2019	(Slovenia) Luka Dončić
2020	(Slovenia) Luka Dončić (2×)
2021	(Serbia) Nikola Jokić
2022	(Serbia) Nikola Jokić (2×)
2023	(Serbia) Nikola Jokić (3×)
2024	(Serbia) Nikola Jokić (4×)
2025	(Serbia) Nikola Jokić (5×)

=== Eurobasket News All-Europe Player of the Year ===
The Eurobasket News All-Europe Player of the Year award is given to the best basketball player on the European continent, in a given calendar year, across all European leagues and competitions. The award is given regardless of the player's nationality, as the winner of the award does not have to have European nationality. The award is decided on by a vote that takes place among over 300 sports journalists that cover European basketball for the website.

*	Inducted into the Naismith Memorial Basketball Hall of Fame
**	Inducted into the FIBA Hall of Fame
***	Inducted into both the Naismith and FIBA Halls of Fame

Player (X) Denotes the number of times the player has been selected.

- Nationalities listed by national team affiliation:

Year	Eurobasket News All-Europe Player of the Year
2002	(Federal Republic of Yugoslavia) Dejan Bodiroga
2003	(Lithuania) Arvydas Macijauskas
2004	(Lithuania) Šarūnas Jasikevičius
2005	(Lithuania) Šarūnas Jasikevičius (2×)
2006	(Greece) Theo Papaloukas
2007	(Greece) Dimitris Diamantidis
2008	(Lithuania) Ramūnas Šiškauskas
2009	(Spain) Juan Carlos Navarro
2010	(Spain) Juan Carlos Navarro (2×)
2011	(Spain) Juan Carlos Navarro (3×)
2012	(Greece) Vassilis Spanoulis
2013	(Greece) Vassilis Spanoulis (2×)
2014	(Spain) Sergio Rodríguez
2015	(Spain) Sergio Rodríguez (2×)
2016	(France) Nando de Colo
2017	(Serbia) Bogdan Bogdanović
2018	(Slovenia) Luka Dončić
2019	(Turkey) Shane Larkin
2020	(Turkey) Shane Larkin (2×)
2021	(Serbia) Vasilije Micić
2022	(Serbia) Vasilije Micić (2×)
2023	(Cape Verde) Edy Tavares
2024	(United States) Kendrick Nunn
2025	(United States) Kendrick Nunn (2×)

=== Eurobasket News All-Europe Team ===
The Eurobasket News All-Europe First Team and Eurobasket News All-Europe Second Team awards are given to the ten best players of all of the European continent, in a given calendar year, across all European leagues and competitions, regardless of the player's nationality, as the winner of the award does not have to have European nationality. The award is decided on by a vote that takes place among over 300 sports journalists that cover European basketball for the website.

*	Inducted into the Naismith Memorial Basketball Hall of Fame
**	Inducted into the FIBA Hall of Fame
***	Inducted into both the Naismith and FIBA Halls of Fame

Player (X) Denotes the number of times the player has been selected.
**Bold** text indicates the player who won the Eurobasket News All-Europe Player of the Year award.

- Nationalities listed by national team affiliation:

Year	Eurobasket News All-Europe First Team	Eurobasket News All-Europe Second Team
Year	Player	Player
2003	(Lithuania) Šarūnas Jasikevičius	(United States) Marcus Brown
2003	(Lithuania) **Arvydas Macijauskas**	(United States) Anthony Parker
2003	(Federal Republic of Yugoslavia) Dejan Bodiroga	(Lithuania) Saulius Štombergas
2003	(Turkey) Mirsad Türkcan	(Croatia) Nikola Vujčić
2003	(Lithuania) Arvydas Sabonis***	(Federal Republic of Yugoslavia) Dejan Tomašević
2004	(Lithuania) **Šarūnas Jasikevičius** (2×)	(Italy) Gianluca Basile
2004	(Lithuania) Arvydas Macijauskas (2×)	(Federal Republic of Yugoslavia) Dejan Milojević
2004	(United States) Anthony Parker (2×)	(United States) Maceo Baston
2004	(Federal Republic of Yugoslavia) Dejan Bodiroga (2×)	(Argentina) Luis Scola
2004	(Lithuania) Arvydas Sabonis*** (2×)	(Croatia) Nikola Vujčić (2×)
2005	(Lithuania) **Šarūnas Jasikevičius** (3×)	(Greece) Theodoros Papaloukas
2005	(Spain) Juan Carlos Navarro	(Lithuania) Arvydas Macijauskas (3×)
2005	(United States) Anthony Parker (3×)	(Greece) Dimitris Diamantidis
2005	(Argentina) Luis Scola (2×)	(Australia) David Andersen
2005	(Croatia) Nikola Vujčić (3×)	(Greece) Lazaros Papadopoulos
2006	(Greece) **Theodoros Papaloukas** (2×)	(Greece) Dimitris Diamantidis (2×)
2006	(Spain) Juan Carlos Navarro (2×)	(Spain) Jorge Garbajosa
2006	(United States) Anthony Parker (4×)	(Slovenia) Matjaž Smodiš
2006	(Argentina) Luis Scola (3×)	(Australia) David Andersen (2×)
2006	(Croatia) Nikola Vujčić (4×)	(Greece) Lazaros Papadopoulos (2×)
2007	(Greece) Theodoros Papaloukas (3×)	(Russia) JR Holden
2007	(Greece) **Dimitris Diamantidis** (3×)	(United States) Trajan Langdon
2007	(Lithuania) Ramūnas Šiškauskas	(Spain) Juan Carlos Navarro (3×)
2007	(Slovenia) Matjaž Smodiš (2×)	(United States) Mike Batiste
2007	(Argentina) Luis Scola (4×)	(Croatia) Nikola Vujčić (5×)
2008	(United States) Trajan Langdon (2×)	(United States) Terrell McIntyre
2008	(Spain) Juan Carlos Navarro (4×)	(Serbia) Igor Rakočević
2008	(Spain) Rudy Fernández	(Greece) Dimitris Diamantidis (4×)
2008	(Lithuania) **Ramūnas Šiškauskas** (2×)	(United States) Terence Morris
2008	(Montenegro) Nikola Peković	(Lithuania) Kšyštof Lavrinovič
2009	(Greece) Vassilis Spanoulis	(United States) Terrell McIntyre (2×)
2009	(Spain) **Juan Carlos Navarro** (5×)	(Serbia) Igor Rakočević (2×)
2009	(Lithuania) Ramūnas Šiškauskas (3×)	(Greece) Dimitris Diamantidis (5×)
2009	(Slovenia) Erazem Lorbek	(Turkey) Ersan İlyasova
2009	(Montenegro) Nikola Peković (2×)	(Brazil) Tiago Splitter
2010	(Serbia) Miloš Teodosić	(North Macedonia) Bo McCalebb
2010	(Spain) **Juan Carlos Navarro** (6×)	(Poland) David Logan
2010	(Lithuania) Linas Kleiza	(United States) Pete Mickeal
2010	(Russia) Victor Khryapa	(Slovenia) Erazem Lorbek (2×)
2010	(Australia) Aleks Marić	(Brazil) Tiago Splitter (2×)
2011	(Greece) Dimitris Diamantidis (6×)	(North Macedonia) Bo McCalebb (2×)
2011	(Spain) **Juan Carlos Navarro** (7×)	(Greece) Vassilis Spanoulis (2×)
2011	(United States) Chuck Eidson	(Russia) Andrei Kirilenko
2011	(Bosnia and Herzegovina) Mirza Teletović	(Poland) Maciej Lampe
2011	(Greece) Sofoklis Schortsanitis	(United States) Mike Batiste (2×)
2012	(Greece) **Vassilis Spanoulis** (3×)	(North Macedonia) Bo McCalebb (3×)
2012	(Greece) Dimitris Diamantidis (7×)	(Spain) Juan Carlos Navarro (8×)
2012	(Russia) Andrei Kirilenko (2×)	(Spain) Rudy Fernández (2×)
2012	(Slovenia) Erazem Lorbek (3×)	(United States) Mike Batiste (3×)
2012	(Serbia) Nenad Krstić	(Lithuania) Jonas Valančiūnas
2013	(Greece) **Vassilis Spanoulis** (4×)	(Italy) Daniel Hackett
2013	(Spain) Rudy Fernández (3×)	(Greece) Dimitris Diamantidis (8×)
2013	(Croatia) Bojan Bogdanović	(Slovenia) Boštjan Nachbar
2013	(Spain) Nikola Mirotić	(Lithuania) Linas Kleiza (2×)
2013	(Serbia) Nenad Krstić (2×)	(Croatia) Ante Tomić
2014	(Spain) **Sergio Rodríguez**	(France) Thomas Heurtel
2014	(United States) Andrew Goudelock	(United States) James Anderson
2014	(Spain) Rudy Fernández (4×)	(United States) Sonny Weems
2014	(Spain) Nikola Mirotić (2×)	(Serbia) Zoran Erceg
2014	(Serbia) Boban Marjanović	(Croatia) Ante Tomić (2×)
2015	(Spain) **Sergio Rodríguez** (2×)	(Turkey) Bobby Dixon
2015	(France) Nando de Colo	(Serbia) Miloš Teodosić
2015	(Serbia) Nemanja Bjelica	(Lithuania) Jonas Mačiulis
2015	(Czech Republic) Jan Veselý	(Argentina) Andrés Nocioni
2015	(Croatia) Ante Tomić (3×)	(Serbia) Boban Marjanović (2×)
2016	(Serbia) Miloš Teodosić (2×)	(Spain) Sergio Llull
2016	(France) **Nando de Colo** (2×)	(United States) Keith Langford
2016	(Spain) Rudy Fernández (5×)	(Italy) Luigi Datome
2016	(Slovenia) Anthony Randolph	(Nigeria) Ekpe Udoh
2016	(Czech Republic) Jan Veselý (2×)	(Greece) Ioannis Bourousis
2017	(Slovenia) Luka Dončić	(Serbia) Miloš Teodosić (3×)
2017	(France) Nando de Colo (3×)	(United States) Keith Langford (2×)
2017	(Serbia) **Bogdan Bogdanović**	(Russia) Alexey Shved
2017	(Greece) Georgios Printezis	(Georgia (country)) Tornike Shengelia
2017	(Nigeria) Ekpe Udoh (2×)	(Czech Republic) Jan Veselý (3×)
2018	(Slovenia) **Luka Dončić** (2×)	(Spain) Sergio Rodríguez (3×)
2018	(United States) Cory Higgins	(France) Nando de Colo (4×)
2018	(Russia) Alexey Shved (2×)	(Greece) Nick Calathes
2018	(Georgia (country)) Tornike Shengelia (2×)	(Italy) Luigi Datome (2×)
2018	(Czech Republic) Jan Veselý (4×)	(Italy) Nicolò Melli
2019	(Turkey) **Shane Larkin**	(Argentina) Facundo Campazzo
2019	(France) Nando de Colo (5×)	(United States) Mike James
2019	(United States) Will Clyburn	(Serbia) Vasilije Micić
2019	(Czech Republic) Jan Veselý (5×)	(United States) Derrick Williams
2019	(Serbia) Nikola Milutinov	(Uganda) Brandon Davies
2020	(Turkey) **Shane Larkin** (2×)	(United States) Mike James (2×)
2020	(Turkey) Scottie Wilbekin	(Serbia) Vasilije Micić (2×)
2020	(Serbia) Vladimir Lučić	(United States) Will Clyburn (2×)
2020	(Spain) Nikola Mirotić (3×)	(Georgia (country)) Tornike Shengelia (3×)
2020	(Cape Verde) Edy Tavares	(Montenegro) Bojan Dubljević
2021	(Turkey) Shane Larkin (3×)	(Canada) Kevin Pangos
2021	(Serbia) **Vasilije Micić** (3×)	(United States) Mike James (3×)
2021	(Serbia) Vladimir Lučić (2×)	(United States) Will Clyburn (3×)
2021	(Spain) Nikola Mirotić (4×)	(Georgia (country)) Tornike Shengelia (4×)
2021	(Cape Verde) Edy Tavares (2×)	(Uganda) Brandon Davies (2×)
2022	(Turkey) Shane Larkin (4×)	(United States) Mike James (4×)
2022	(Serbia) **Vasilije Micić** (4×)	(Greece) Kostas Sloukas
2022	(Bulgaria) Sasha Vezenkov	(Spain) Lorenzo Brown
2022	(Spain) Nikola Mirotić (5×)	(United States) Will Clyburn (4×)
2022	(Cape Verde) Edy Tavares (3×)	(Greece) Georgios Papagiannis
2023	(United States) Mike James (5×)	(Greece) Kostas Sloukas (2×)
2023	(United States) Kevin Punter	(Serbia) Vasilije Micić (5×)
2023	(Bosnia and Herzegovina) Džanan Musa	(United States) Will Clyburn (5×)
2023	(Bulgaria) Sasha Vezenkov (2×)	(Spain) Nikola Mirotić (6×)
2023	(Cape Verde) **Edy Tavares** (4×)	(France) Mathias Lessort
2024	(United States) T. J. Shorts	(Argentina) Facundo Campazzo
2024	(United States) **Kendrick Nunn**	(Greece) Kostas Sloukas (3×)
2024	(United States) Nigel Hayes-Davis	(Bosnia and Herzegovina) Džanan Musa (2×)
2024	(Bulgaria) Sasha Vezenkov (3×)	(Spain) Nikola Mirotić (7×)
2024	(France) Mathias Lessort (2×)	(Cape Verde) Edy Tavares (5×)
2025	(United States) Jared Harper	(Argentina) Facundo Campazzo (2×)
2025	(United States) **Kendrick Nunn** (2×)	(United States) Kevin Punter (2×)
2025	(United States) Nigel Hayes-Davis (2×)	(Bosnia and Herzegovina) Džanan Musa (3×)
2025	(Bulgaria) Sasha Vezenkov (4×)	(Spain) Nikola Mirotić (8×)
2025	(Cape Verde) Edy Tavares (6×)	(Serbia) Nikola Milutinov (2×)

=== Eurobasket News Top 20 All-Time Best European Basketball Players (1998) ===
In 1998, Eurobasket News published its list of the Eurobasket News Top 20 All-Time Best European Basketball Players. The players were selected through a voting process that included 24 sports media journalists that covered European basketball, in a collaboration with Eurobasket.com.

- Nationalities listed by national team affiliation:

Top 20 All-Time Best European Basketball Players (1998)
Rank	Player	Nationality
1.	Arvydas Sabonis	Soviet Union / Lithuania
2.	Dražen Petrović	Yugoslavia / Croatia
3.	Toni Kukoč	Yugoslavia / Croatia
4.	Sergei Belov	Soviet Union
5.	Dino Meneghin	Italy
6.	Nikos Galis	Greece
7.	Vlade Divac	Yugoslavia / (Federal Republic of Yugoslavia) FR Yugoslavia
8.	Detlef Schrempf	Germany
9.	Dražen Dalipagić	Yugoslavia
10.	Krešo Ćosić	Yugoslavia
11.	Šarūnas Marčiulionis	Soviet Union / Lithuania
12.	Sasha Danilović	Yugoslavia
13.	Juan Antonio Corbalán	Spain
14.	Dino Radja	Yugoslavia / Croatia
15.	Artūras Karnišovas	Soviet Union / Lithuania
16.	Rik Smits	Netherlands
17.	Sasha Djordjević	Yugoslavia / (Federal Republic of Yugoslavia) FR Yugoslavia
18.	Stano Kropilák	Czechoslovakia / Czech Republic
19.	Antonello Riva	Italy
20.	Juan Antonio San Epifanio "Epi"	Spain
Honorable Mention Top 21-32 All-Time Best European Basketball Players (1998)
21.	Miki Berkovich	Israel
22.	Mirza Delibašić	Yugoslavia
23.	Panagiotis Fasoulas	Greece
24.	Doron Jamchi	Israel
25.	Radivoj Korać	Yugoslavia
26.	Rimas Kurtinaitis	Soviet Union / Lithuania
27.	Gheorghe Mureșan	Romania
28.	Aco Petrović	Yugoslavia / Croatia
29.	Vladimir Tkachenko	Soviet Union
30.	Sasha Volkov	Soviet Union / Ukraine
31.	Richard Dacoury	France
32.	Georgi Glouchkov	Bulgaria

=== Eurobasket News European Basketball Hall of Fame Players ===
The Eurobasket News Hall of Fame is a result of the voting contributions of over 300 Eurobasket.com staff members and correspondents, over a span of almost 30 years (since 1997).

- Nationalities listed by national team affiliation:

Hall of Fame Player	Nationality
Alexander Belov	Soviet Union
Sergei Belov	Soviet Union
Dejan Bodiroga	Yugoslavia
Miki Berkowitz	Israel
Juan Antonio Corbalan	Spain
Ivo Daneu	Yugoslavia
Predrag Danilovic	Yugoslavia
Mirza Delibasic	Yugoslavia
Pau Gasol	Spain
Panagiotis Giannakis	Greece
Atanas Golomeev	Bulgaria
Doron Jamchy	Israel
Dragan Kicanovic	Yugoslavia
Fernando Martin	Spain
Mieczysław Łopatka	Poland
Pierluigi Marzorati	Italy
Dirk Nowitzki	Germany
Modestas Paulauskas	Lithuania
Emiliano Rodriguez	Spain
Arvydas Sabonis	Lithuania
Dražen Petrović	Croatia
Toni Kukoč	Croatia
Panagiotis Fasoulas	Greece
Dino Meneghin	Italy
Nikos Galis	Greece
Vlade Divac	Yugoslavia
Detlef Schrempf	Germany
Dražen Dalipagić	Yugoslavia
Krešimir Ćosić	Croatia
Sarunas Marciulionis	Lithuania
Dino Radja	Croatia
Arturas Karnisovas	Lithuania
Rik Smits	Netherlands
Aleksandar Đorđević	Yugoslavia
Stanislav Kropilak	Czech Republic
Antonello Riva	Italy
Epi	Spain
Antoine Rigaudeau	France
Zoran Slavnic	Yugoslavia
Predrag Stojakovic	Yugoslavia
Sergei Tarakanov	Soviet Union
Valdis Valters	Latvia
Aleksandr Volkov	Ukraine
Jure Zdovc	Slovenia
Jiri Zidek Sr.	Czech Republic

=== Eurobasket News All-Europe Coach of the Year ===
The Eurobasket News All-Europe Coach of the Year award is given to the best head basketball coach on the European continent, in a given calendar year, across all European leagues and competitions. The award is given regardless of the coach's nationality, as the winner of the award does not have to have European nationality. The award is decided on by a vote that takes place among over 300 sports journalists that cover European basketball for the website.

*	Inducted into the Naismith Memorial Basketball Hall of Fame
**	Inducted into the FIBA Hall of Fame
***	Inducted into both the Naismith and FIBA Halls of Fame

Player (X) Denotes the number of times the coach has been selected.

- Nationalities listed by national team affiliation:

Year	Eurobasket News All-Europe Coach of the Year
2002	(Federal Republic of Yugoslavia) Svetislav Pešić**
2003	(Federal Republic of Yugoslavia) Svetislav Pešić**
2004	(Italy) Carlo Recalcati
2005	(Greece) Panagiotis Giannakis
2006	(Italy) Ettore Messina**
2007	(Serbia) Željko Obradović
2008	(Italy) Ettore Messina** (2×)
2009	(Serbia) Željko Obradović (2×)
2010	(Spain) Xavi Pascual
2011	(Serbia) Željko Obradović (3×)
2012	(Serbia) Dušan Ivković**
2013	(Greece) Georgios Bartzokas
2014	(Israel) David Blatt
2015	(Spain) Pablo Laso
2016	(Greece) Dimitris Itoudis
2017	(Serbia) Igor Kokoškov
2018	(Lithuania) Šarūnas Jasikevičius
2019	(Greece) Dimitris Itoudis (2×)
2020	(Turkey) Ergin Ataman
2021	(Turkey) Ergin Ataman (2×)
2022	(Turkey) Ergin Ataman (3×)
2023	(Spain) Chus Mateo
2024	(Turkey) Ergin Ataman (4×)

=== Eurobasket News European Basketball Hall of Fame Head Coaches ===
The Eurobasket News Hall of Fame is a result of the voting contributions of over 300 Eurobasket.com staff members and correspondents, over a span of almost 30 years (since 1997).

- Nationalities listed by national team affiliation:

Head Coach	Nationality
Ergin Ataman	Turkey
Antonio Diaz-Miguel	Spain
Giannis Ioannidis	Greece
Dusko Ivanovic	Yugoslavia
Dusan Ivkovic	Yugoslavia
Jonas Kazlauskas	Lithuania
Igor Kokoskov	Yugoslavia
Erman Kunter	Turkey
Pedro Ferrandiz	Spain
Sandro Gamba	Italy
Alexander Gomelsky	Soviet Union
Evgeny Gomelsky	Soviet Union
Carlos Lisboa	Portugal
Ettore Messina	Italy
Aleksandar Nikolic	Yugoslavia
Mirko Novosel	Croatia
Svetislav Pesic	Yugoslavia
Giancarlo Primo	Italy
Carlo Recalcati	Italy
Cesare Rubini	Italy
Sasha Obradovic	Yugoslavia
Zelimir Obradovic	Yugoslavia
Aydin Ors	Turkey
Craig Pedersen	Iceland
Bogdan Tanjevic	Yugoslavia
Ivan Sunara	Croatia
Ranko Zeravica	Yugoslavia

== See also ==
- Basket News
