= Bhura Hayal =

Pakistani village

Coordinates: 33°30′55.64″N 73°23′30.05″E

- Village
- Location within Pakistan
- Country: Pakistan
- Province: Punjab
- District: Rawalpindi
- Time zone: UTC+5 (PST)

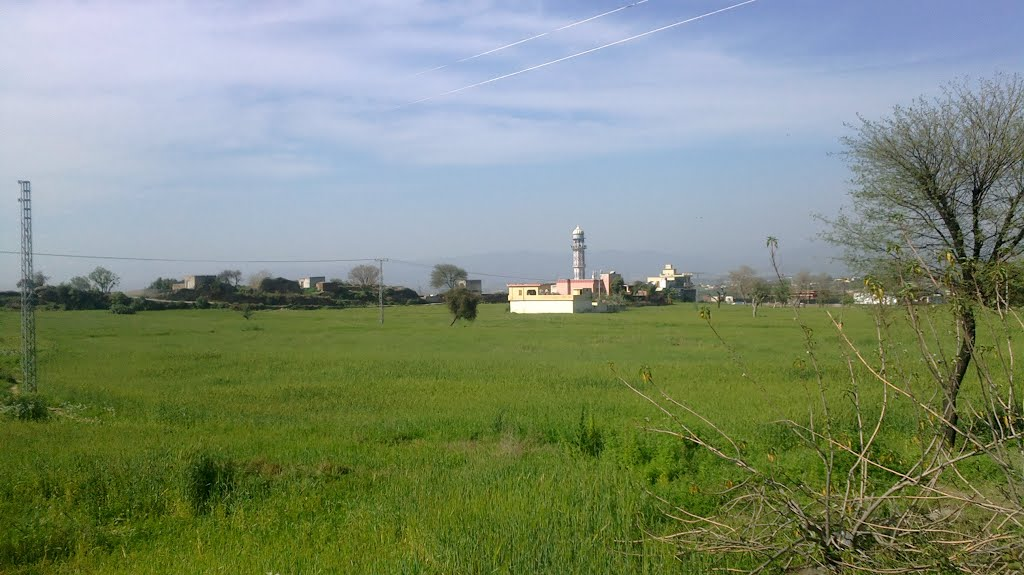
Jamia Masjid Farooqia

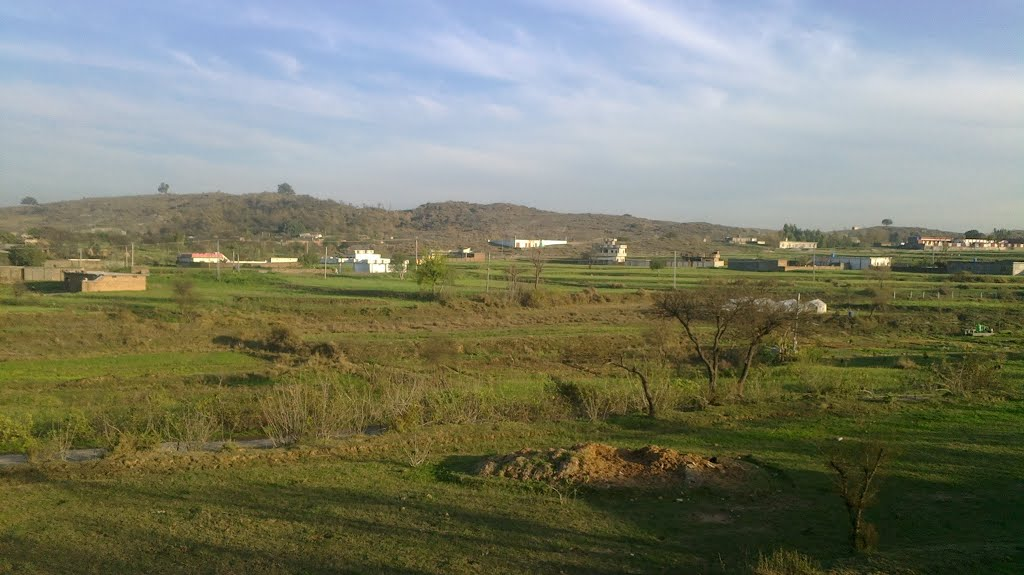
Panorama

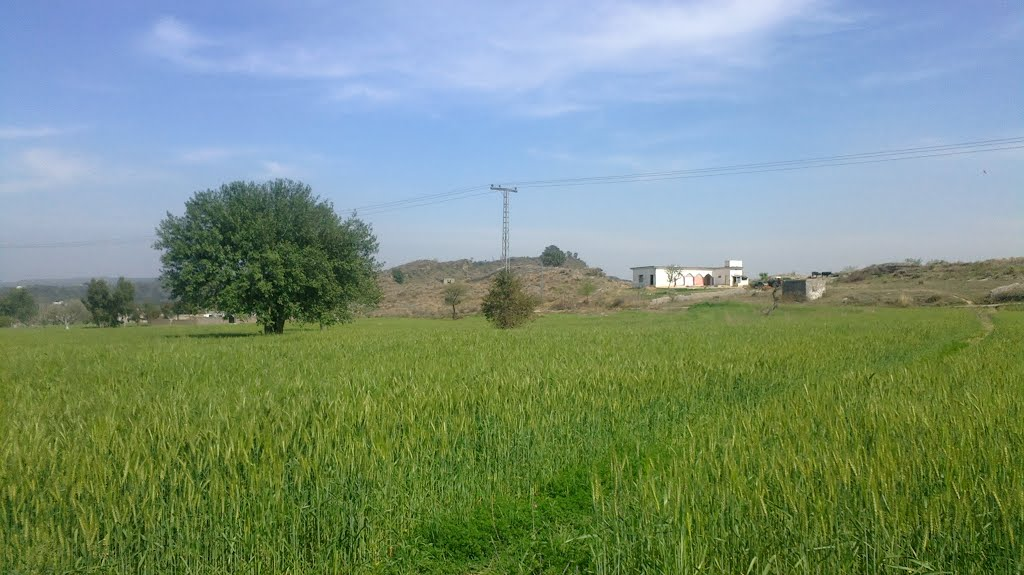
View Towards Bakko Ki Bohr

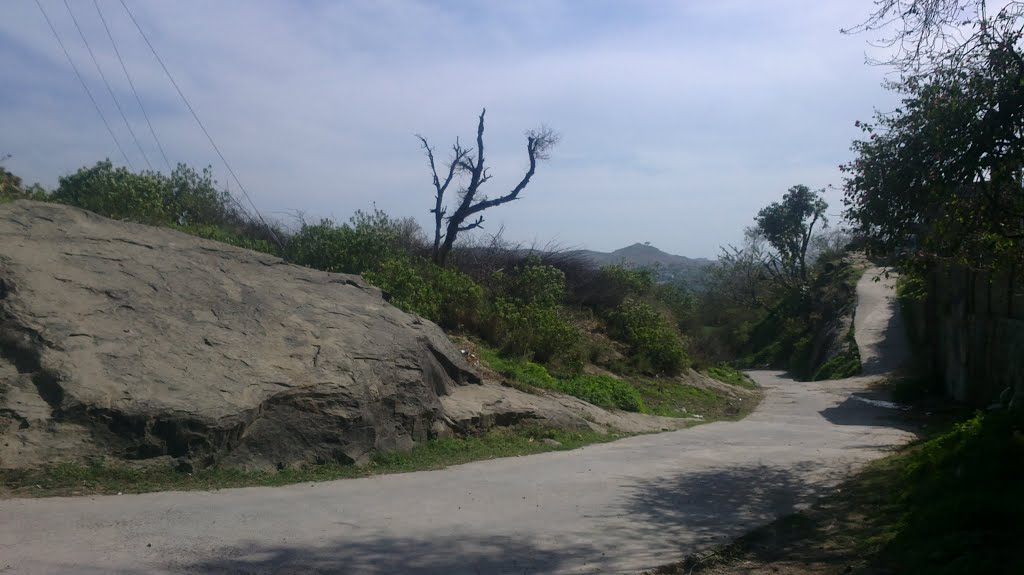
Road leading to Dhakki, Dehri Mandhar and Qibli

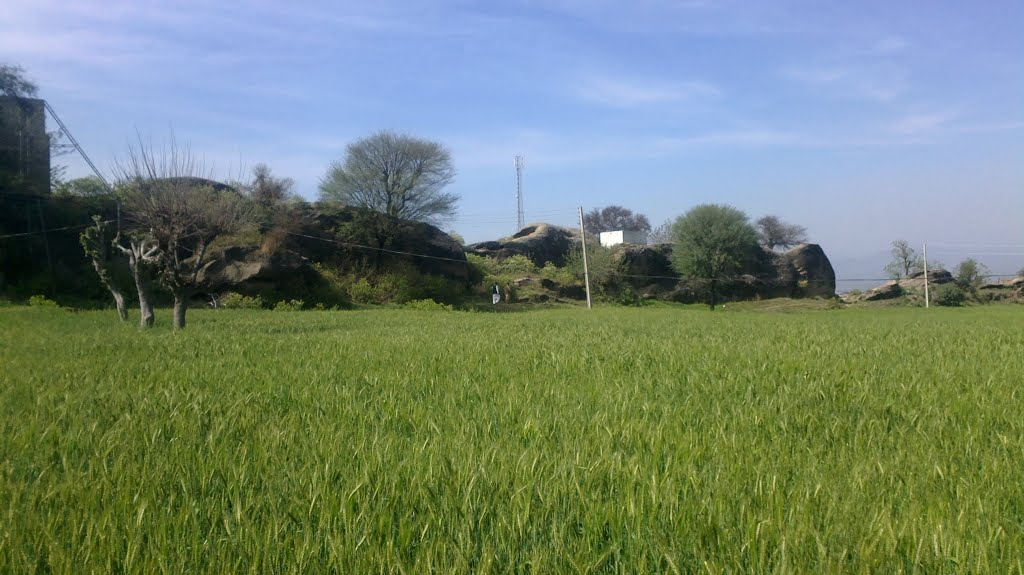
Boulders in the Village

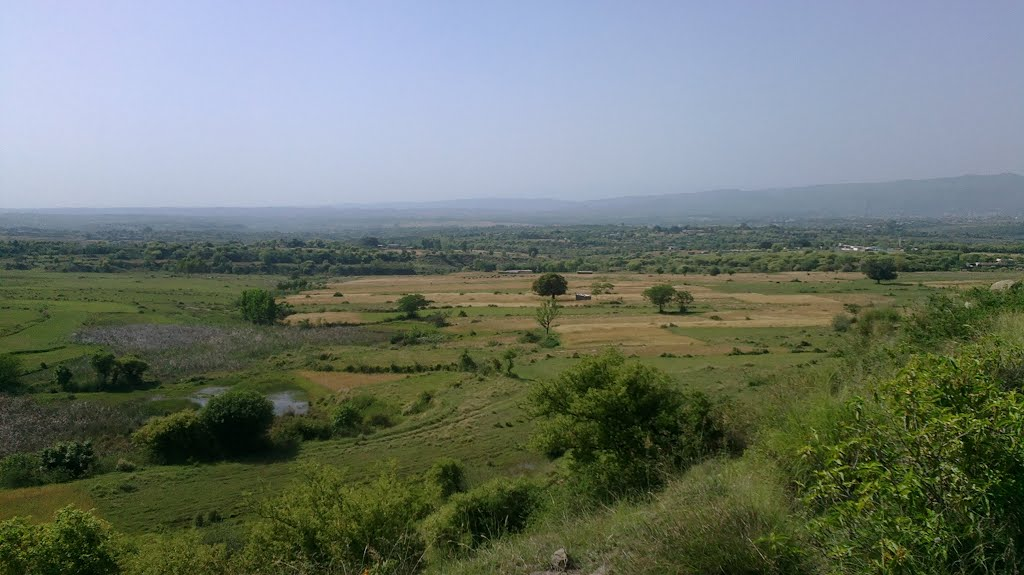
View from Top

Bhura Hayal (بھورہ حیال ) is a village in Kahuta Tehsil, in Rawalpindi District of Punjab, Pakistan with a population of about 15,000+. It is located about 8 Kilometers from Chowk Pindori on Thoa Khalsa- Matore Road.

== Origins ==
The name originates from "Hayal" family which settled here a long time ago. While "Bhura" is referred to a jungle in the Pothowari language. It is not known with certainty, when exactly the area was inhabited, however Banyan trees with water ponds underneath, scattered around the adjoining small villages, suggest that it dates back to thousands of years before. As regarding the Muslim origin in this area, it is said that Muslim Army (Sultans or Mughals) fought a war here in some remote past. Graveyards of their Shuhada with distinctly different style of graves exist as of today at two to three different places near Bhura Hayal. At one place it is called "Shaheedan" (about 2 Kilometers from Bhura Hayal on road to Chowk Pindori). A similar graveyard exists at Bhata. A Mughal family lives in the Bhura Hayal which is believed to be settled here, since the Mughal era. Another of their clan lives in a nearby village, Mohra Hayal located near Chowk Pindori. The exact history is not known, yet the proximity and alignment of these villages and above mentioned graveyards suggests a battle took place in the direction of Kashmir from Punjab and meanwhile the settlement of invaders families. Prior to the creation of Pakistan, Hindu families also lived here and on their migration to India, the vacuum was filled by the Muslim migrants from Shimla and later by some Kashmiri families.

== Geography ==
The towering minaret of Jamia Masjid (Farooqia) is situated in the center of the village. On its northern side there are layers of Kahuta, Murree and Kashmir mountains of varying heights. Low-lying ridge line where in the recent past DHA Islamabad and Bahria Town have developed their housing scheme "DHA Valley" just 4-5 Kilometers towards West. Occasionally, on a clear sky day one can see "Faisal Mosque", the main Jamia Mosque of Islamabad towards North West. The peak of Pir Panjal Range is also visible quite often early in the morning (prior to sunrise only, in the north-east direction). Kallar Syedan a major Potohar town lies on its South Eastern side. A ridge forms a crest line on its immediate East, shielding the view towards Thoa Khalsa. A feature of this ridge line is that it is a watershed to two different rivers i.e. Indus and Jehlum. The water that flows towards East and south of this line goes into Jehlum River, while that flowing in the western and northern directions goes into River Indus. This watershed line then turns towards village Bhura Hayal itself. On a few houses on upper crest of the Bhura Hayal and Maira village, this phenomenon can be observed where water from roof tops goes to the Indus River while that from the courtyard goes to the River Jehlum. The road passing through the village goes to Hajira and Rawalakot in Kashmir. Another road going to Kashmir through Kahuta joins in this road at Beor near River Jehlum. The average temperature remains from 10 to 20 degrees Celsius in winter and from 25 to 38 degrees Celsius in Summer. The maximum spell of heat in summer is felt in June, July, August and up to the middle of September only, in all other months the weather remains pleasant. Sehora, Kaka, Rakh, Nullah, Karlahi, Dhaniam, Hallan, Dehri, Mandhar, Qibli, Pari, Aara, Dhok Peeple Wali are some other villages around. Sai, Kot, Bamlot, Mowara, Pamana, are slightly away.

== Livelihoods ==
Farming is the main profession, however many join the service sector, particularly the Army. The area has produced many veteran soldiers who have served in Pakistan as well as in the British Army. Some participated in the Burma campaign during the Second World War. Wheat, barley, mustard, maze, peanuts and Indian pulses are some of the major crops grown here. There is a lot of potential for goat and cattle farming which however is not being fully utilized. .They have preserved rich traditions of Pothohar to a great extent. Pothohari language with its original dialects and accent is spoken by locals, however English and Urdu language have significantly influenced and changed the dialect/ accent amongst educated people.
