= Chowk Pindori =

Place in Rawalpindi, Pakistan

Chowk Pindori is a village situated near Kallar Syedan in Rawalpindi, Pakistan. Connecting hilly areas of the region, it is the starting point of Kohsar Tourism Expressway. Two sub-villages, Shahbagh and Darkali, are nearby.

Pothowari, which resembles Punjabi, is the predominant spoken language.

== Economy ==
The community's main source of income is agriculture. Locals mainly cultivate wheat and maize, along with dairy products.

== Culture ==
Punjabi culture is practiced by the community. Inhabitants usually wear shalwar kameez, dupatta, and perform bhangra in wedding functions.
