= Les Grandes Aventures =

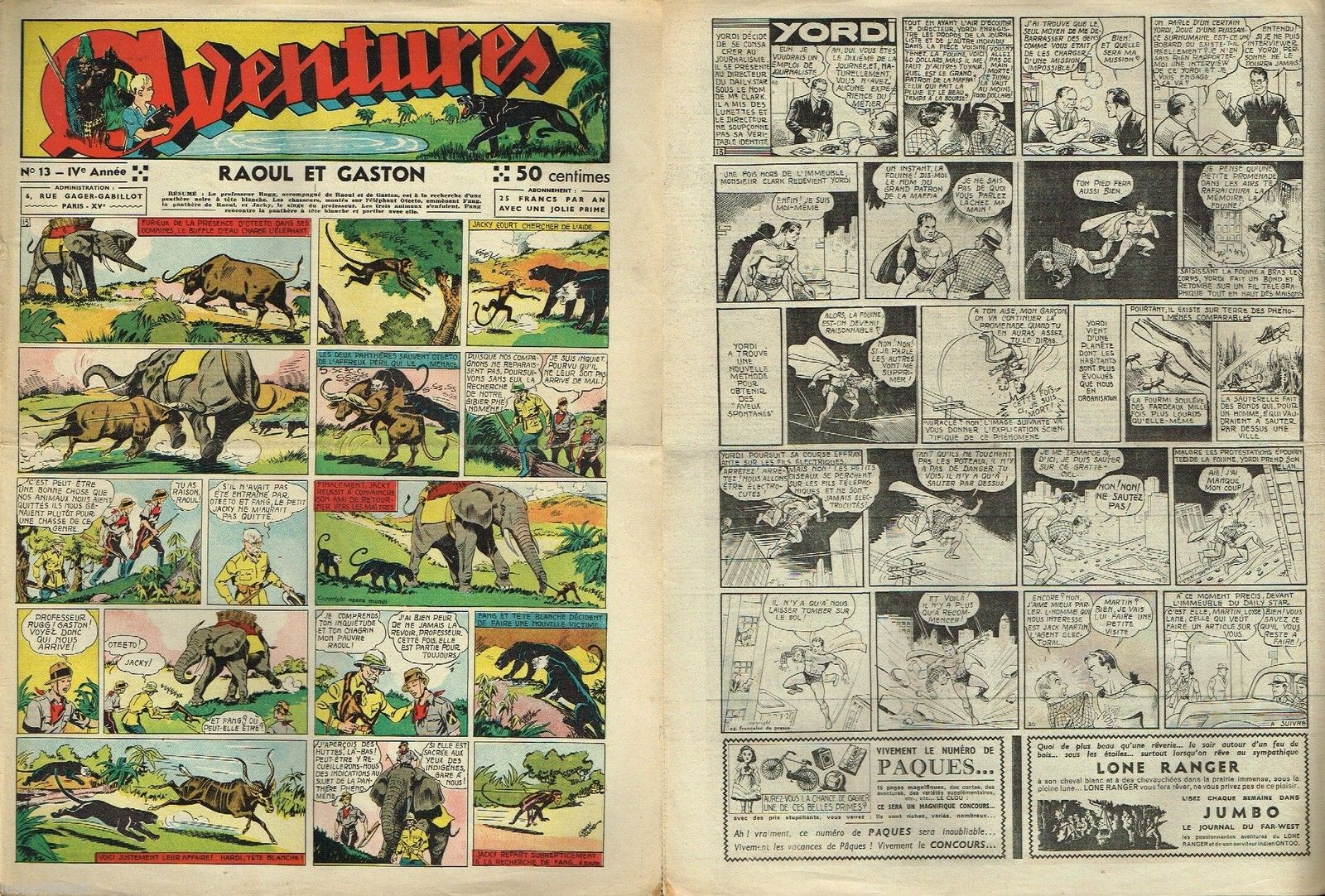
Les Grandes Aventures #12 cover and backpage (Featuring Superman beside Tom Mix)

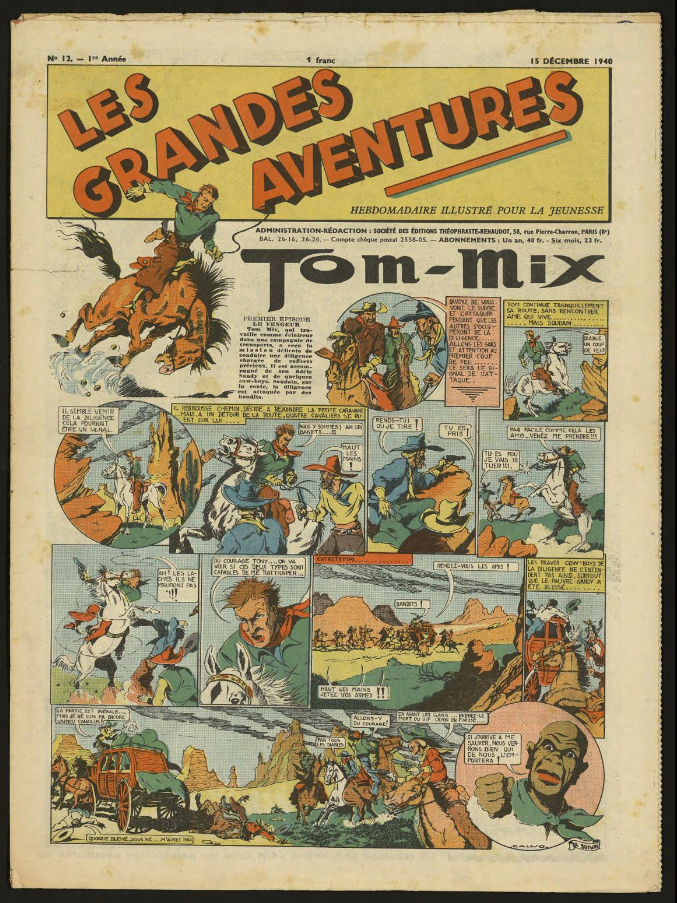
Tom Mix in Les Grandes Aventures #12

Les Grandes Aventures was a French Tabloid/comic magazine which ran for 70 weekly issues between the 16th of September 1940 and 1942 in Vichy France during WWII German occupation. It included episodes of "Tom Mix", "Superman" and "Jean Lafitte", as well as the "Strange Adventures of Robinson Crusoe and Friday", "Buffalo Bill" and "Bertrand le Preux".

== Ownership ==
Moniales or "Librairie Moderne" publishers oversaw Les Grandes Aventures' publication. According to one source, Moniales was owned by "an anti-fascist Italian who had fled Mussolini’s dictatorship", referring to owner Ettore Carozzo. The publishing house has also gone by names of "SAGE" (acronym for Société anonyme d'édition) and now Sagédition.

== Tom Mix ==
Tom Mix featured on the first page of the periodical throughout the majority of the 70 issues. Tom Mix was only drawn by Edmond Francois Calvo. Store | Vente de planches originales de bande dessinée | Ensemble du catalogue | HUBERTY & BREYNE

== Superman/Yordi ==
Under the title of "Yordi", Superman made his second debut in French comics in Les Grandes Aventures #13.
