= Clara (magazine) =

Feminist magazine based in Paris, France

Clara, stylized as CLARA, is a French-language feminist magazine based in Paris, France. The magazine was launched in 1987 as a successor of another feminist magazine, Femmes françaises. Gwendoline Lefebvre is one of the contributors.
