= Ciné-Mondial =

French language film magazine published by Nazis (1941–1944)

- Editor-in-chief: Pierre Heuzé
- Categories: Film magazine
- Frequency: Weekly
- Founded: 1941
- First issue: 8 August 1941
- Final issue: 11 August 1944
- Company: Éditions Le Pont
- Country: France
- Based in: Paris
- Language: French

Ciné-Mondial was a weekly film magazine which was published in France in the period between 1941 and 1944 when Nazi Germany occupied the country. It is known for being the sole publication on movies in France during that period.

== History and profile ==
Ciné-Mondial was started in 1941 shortly after the occupation of France by the Nazi forces. Its first issue appeared on 8 August that year. The magazine was founded by the German authorities who banned all French film magazines, including Cinémonde, Ciné-Miroir and Pour Vous. Its financier was the German embassy in Paris. It was part of Éditions Le Pont and came out weekly. Robert Muzard was the director of the magazine, and Pierre Heuzé served as its editor-in-chief.

Nazi occupiers established two cinema clubs in Paris, and the magazine was affiliated with one of them. It frequently published news about this club which had been founded in September 1943. It also attempted to improve the credibility of Nazi films among French people. However, it never featured the photographs of Nazi leaders. Because it avoided negative reactions of its readers who were mostly young adults and women. The magazine folded on 11 August 1944.
