= Ahmed Hilmi of Filibe =

Ahmed Hilmi of Filibe (or Ahmed Hilmi) (1865–1914) was a Sufi Turkish language writer and thinker. In Turkish he is usually called Şehbenderzâde Filibeli Ahmed Hilmi ("Ahmed Hilmi of Plovdiv Son of A Consul"). Being a Sufi, his thoughts were influenced by the Sufi thought, more specifically the wahdat al-wujud, greatly. He also supported the anti-materialistic way of thinking and was a great rival to his materialist contemporary writer and thinkers.

== Biography ==
He was born in Plovdiv (Filibe), where his father, Süleyman Bey, was a consul. This is where his title Şehbenderzâde, meaning "son of a consul", comes from. He has taken his first education from the religious official (müftü) of Plovdiv, until he moved to İzmir with his family. Later he entered Galatasaray Lycee. Upon the end of his education, he started to work as a government official in Beirut. Due to a political problem he ran away to Egypt from Beirut. In 1901 he returned to Istanbul, but later he was arrested and exiled to Fizan. Here his interest in Sufism grew and he started to believe in the Sufi thought of wahdat al-wujud (وحدة الوجود, "unity of being"). His entry into Sufism changed his views greatly and the influence of Sufism on his works are very clear.

In 1908, following the declaration of the Constitutional government (Meşrutiyet) he returned to Istanbul. Here, he started to publish a weekly newspaper named İttihat-ı İslam ("Islamic Union"). However the newspaper could not continue for a long time and he started to write in some other papers. In 1910, he started to publish another weekly newspaper named Hikmet ("Wisdom"). The same year, he established a publishing house named Hikmet Matbaa-yi İslâmiyesi ("Wisdom Islamic Publishing"), which published mostly works on Islamic thought.

With his own unique thought he started to criticise İttihat ve Terakki Cemiyeti ("Committee of Union and Progress"), mostly in his newspaper Hikmet, which was turned into a daily paper from weekly by the year of 1911.

Due to his thoughts and his great efforts to publish them, his paper Hikmet was banned, along with his publishing company, and he was exiled to Bursa. However, following the end of his exile, he started to publish Hikmet again. As a result of his ideas, which were not close to any major political group of the time, his paper could not continue to publish for very long. His masterpiece is the famous "A'mâk-ı Hayâl", ("The Depths of Imagination") which is about the wahdat al-wujud.

Writing many pieces, most of which are Islamic and anti-materialistic, he also published a humor magazine named Coşkun Kalender. Apart from his writer identity, he also worked as a philosophy teacher in Dârü'l-Fünûn (Istanbul University).

He died in October 1914 due to poisoning. It is not very clear if it was a murder or not, however there is a well-circulated conspiracy theory that he was poisoned by Freemasons, who were his well-known rivals. This conspiracy theory has no evidence.

== A'mâk-ı Hayâl ==
A'mâk-ı Hayâl ("The Depths of Fantasy"), is the Sufi magnum opus of Ahmed Hilmi of Filibe. A'mâk-ı Hayâl is a novel that was written in 1913, the subject of which is the Sufi wahdat al-wujud belief. Ahmed Hilmi, himself, was a strict follower of the wahdat al-wujud.

In the frame story of novel, young Râci, the protagonist, tries to find answers to his questions about life, most of which are mainly ontological problems. He tries to find the answers in science, philosophy and religion. However he can't find any answer that satisfies him. In this point he meets Aynalı Baba, who is a dervish-like Sufi. They meet every day and during their meetings, Râci falls asleep and dreams of fantastic worlds and situations. Each dream or fantasy demonstrates an aspect of Sufi thought, more specifically the wahdat al-wujud.
