= Housewives demonstrations =

Women protest poverty and rationing in WW2 France

- Manifestations de ménagères Part of demonstrations across France
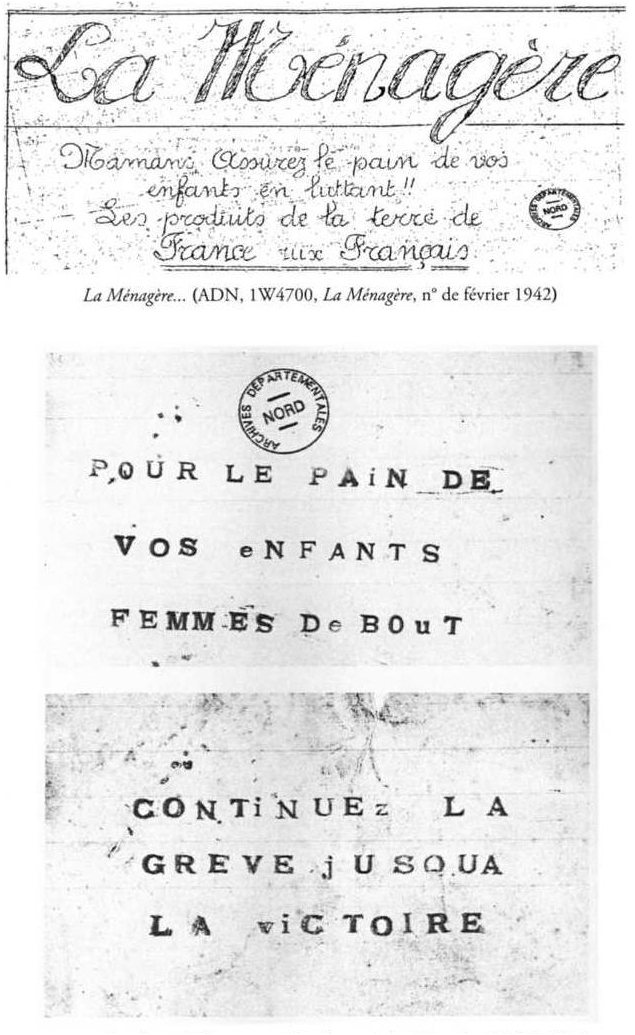
- Fliers calling for homemakers to demonstrate, distributed in Valenciennes during the Occupation of France
- Date: November 1940 to September 1942
- Location: France
- Caused by: poverty, rationing, restrictive laws
- Goals: ration cards, bread, coal, and other essential goods
- Methods: street protests
- Result: opposition by the government

Lead figures
French Communist Party	

Number
dozens to thousands	

Map of housewives demonstrations (1940-1942).

The housewives demonstrations in France were street protests against shortages and restrictions in France during the Second World War attended mostly by women, at a time when gatherings were subject to prior authorization by the German occupying force or by the Vichy regime.

Often demonstrating with their children, they demanded more food and essential goods in front of prefectures and town halls. These movements took place mainly between November 1940 and September 1942, and occurred in various departements, particularly where the Communist Party was well established.

While these movements were in part a spontaneous reaction to terrible living conditions, they were also the result of mobilization by the Communist Party, and considered a form of resistance.

== Introduction ==
Although street demonstrations were forbidden, nevertheless from 1941 onwards around 240 so-called "housewives' demonstrations" were organized to protest against the poor supply of food and basic necessities. The term "housewives' demonstration" first appeared at the time, indicating either that they were a new phenomenon or were reported as such. In the course of the 19th century, the model of the "housewife", who runs her household with ingenuity, even when she has a job, was imposed on women, starting in the cities. During the German occupation of France during the Second World War, they were largely responsible for ensuring survival in the face of everyday difficulties, and for feeding, clothing and heating the family. The queues are full of housewives.

The vast majority of these demonstrations were attended by women, which represented a break with the pre-war situation. They numbered from a few dozen to as many as a thousand. Most of the time they were few in number except in Sète, where on January 20, 1942, participation can be estimated at 2,000 women.

Demonstrators often took their children with them. They would go to the prefecture or town hall and send a delegation, sometimes with a petition, to demand more food, coal or other necessities. According to one account by the Commissaire de police in Dunkirk:

On 17 April 1941, at around 10 a.m., around 200 women ... went to the Dunkirk town hall and demanded ... additional bread ration cards. Turned away, they made their way toward the sub-prefecture, and were turned back by the security service as they approached. The demonstrators then came back towards Dunkirk town hall in small groups .... Around a hundred gathered in front of the town hall, demanding bread cards, potatoes and dried vegetables. In the afternoon, the demonstrators gathered again in front of the town hall and headed for the sub-prefecture.

The demands expressed immediate needs, and rarely were explicitly political. They were often fulfilled in 1940-1941, but with greater difficulty in 1941-1942, when the government feared contagion. To mobilize, organizers drew on what they saw as successes elsewhere, such as in Lanester, Morbihan, where the leaflet distributed on the night of April 15-6, 1942 read:

Women.. our children are hungry. Following the example of women of the 20th arrondissement of Paris, and the housewives of Troyes, Belfort and Reims, who, after petitioning, have obtained an increase in supplies, let us demand [more] bread. To keep French wheat French, let's sign petitions and demonstrate our disapproval in front of town halls.

== Major events ==
These demonstrations took place mainly from November 1940 to July 1941, and from November 1941 to September 1942, both in the Paris region, as well as around the country in the Nord and Pas-de-Calais, all along the Mediterranean coast from the Pyrénées-Orientales to the Alpes-Maritimes, in the Doubs, the Calvados, the Morbihan and other departments.

The first protests took place in November 1940. In Carcassonne, Béziers and Marseille, women protested in front of prefectures, demanding potatoes. These early demonstrations were followed by some sixty others up to the summer of 1941, in the occupied zone. From the following winter until September 1942, the women's demonstrations began again in greater numbers, about twice as many (130) as in the previous year, and broadened to some twenty departments. Chiefly working-class women were involved.

Their demands became part of broader movements and gave way to patriotic demonstrations, which began to multiply in May 1942. Subsequently, demonstrations by housewives were fewer, numbering around forty in two periods: the first, between May and September 1943, and again in the first half of 1944.

The ebb and flow of protests followed a seasonal pattern. More numerous in winter and spring, they tended to correspond to periods of increasing hardship during the pre-harvest scarcity that precedes the next harvest.

== Impact and reaction ==
The Vichy Regime was concerned by this and tried to curb the movement by forbidding dissemination of information about the demonstrations and warning mayors that there would be no extra deliveries of food. However, the French authorities did not dare to use force against the women's marches. The German occupiers, who were not the main target of the protests, felt little concern. The regime clamped down much less on housewives' demonstrations than they did on patriotic ones. In some cases, the police or gendarmerie tried to prevent a march from advancing, arresting the "leaders" or keeping an eye on them, like the activists Alphonsine Delanois or Madeleine Porquet in the Nord department.

== Spontaneous and organized ==
With their seasonal nature, their predominantly feminine character, the role of rumor in triggering them and the rivalries between localities, these demonstrations had many antiquated features reminiscent of the food riots of the Ancien Régime. Demonstrations often started at the market, where the absence of one essential product or another triggered angry emotions.

Nevertheless, the extent to which these movements were spontaneous is open to question. While their sudden appearance was clearly evident in the Doubs or the Var in 1942, that was not always the case elsewhere. Indeed, there were many cases of demonstrators responding to the call of unsigned leaflets with concrete demands.

The communists played a role in organizing these demonstrations. In April 1941, the underground paper L'Humanité appealed to women to go "en masse to the town halls to claim their due". Most of the demonstrations in spring 1941 took place in working-class municipalities that had been run by the pre-war Popular Front in the Parisian "red belt" suburbs, the Nord, and Pas-de-Calais. The geographical expansion of these movements in the winter and spring of 1941-1942 was also supported by the Communists, although this did not hamper local initiatives

== See also ==
- Black market in wartime France
- French Resistance
- German occupation of France
- Vichy France
- Zone libre

== Works cited ==
- Condette, Jean-François (2007). "Les manifestations de ménagères dans le département du Nord de 1940 à 1944 : Révolte frumentaire ou résistance ?". In Robert Vandenbussche (dir.) (ed.). Femmes et Résistance en Belgique et en zone interdite. Histoire et littérature du Septentrion (IRHiS) (in French). Lille: Publications de l’Institut de recherches historiques du Septentrion. p. 125–164. ISBN 978-2-490296-12-5.
- Guillon, Jean-Marie (1996). "Le Var. La pénurie, c'est les autres" [The Var. The shortage is for others]. Bulletins de l'Institut d'Histoire du Temps Présent (in French). 32 (1): 439–452. doi:10.3406/ihtp.1996.2353.
- Guillon, Jean-Marie (1997). "Le retour des émotions populaires : manifestations de ménagères en 1942". Mélanges Michel Vovelle: Sociétés, mentalités, cultures : France (15th–20th c.) (in French). Vol. aixois. Aix-en-Provence: Publications de l’Université de Provence. p. 267-276. ISBN 9782853993937.
- Guillon, Jean-Marie (2015). "Les ménagères, du combat quotidien à la Résistance". In Luc Capdevila, Patrick Harismendy (dir.) (ed.). L'engagement et l'émancipation: Ouvrage offert à Jacqueline Sainclivier (in French). Rennes: Presses universitaires de Rennes. p. 279–293. doi:10.4000/books.pur.90657. ISBN 978-2-7535-4102-3.
- Tartakowsky, Danielle (1996). "Manifester pour le pain, novembre 1940-octobre 1947". Bulletins de l'Institut d'Histoire du Temps Présent (in French). 32: 465–478. doi:10.3406/ihtp.1996.2355.
- Tartakowsky, Danielle (1997). Les manifestations de rue en France 1918-1968. Histoire de la France au XIXe et au XXe siècle (in French). Paris: Publications de la Sorbonne. ISBN 2-85944-307-X.
- Tartakowsky, Danielle (2010). "Les manifestations patriotiques" [Patriotic demonstrations]. In Jean-Luc Leleu; Françoise Passera; Jean Quellien (dir.) (eds.). La France pendant la Seconde Guerre mondiale [France During the Second World War] (in French). Paris: Fayard - Ministère de la Défense. ISBN 9782213654614.
