= L'Indépendance arabe =

Political magazine in Paris, France (1907–1908)

- Editor-in-chief: Eugène Jung
- Categories: Political magazine
- Frequency: Monthly
- Founder: Naguib Azoury
- Founded: 1907
- First issue: April 1907
- Final issue: September 1908
- Country: France
- Based in: Paris
- Language: French

L'Indépendance arabe was a short-lived monthly political magazine with special reference to the aspirations of political independence of the Arabs. The magazine was based in Paris, France, and was published between 1907 and 1908.

== History and profile ==
L'Indépendance arabe was first published in Paris in April 1907. Naguib Azoury was the director, and Eugène Jung was the editor-in-chief of the magazine which was published on a monthly basis. Azoury published articles in L'Indépendance arabe which called for the independence of all people living in the Ottoman Empire and for the independent states for them. He argued that France should actively take part in ending the Ottoman oppression against the Arabs. His writings were also anti-Semitic which led to accusations of him being an agent of the Catholic Church.

L'Indépendance arabe folded after producing 18 issues in September 1908 shortly after the declaration of the constitution in the Ottoman Empire. Because both Azoury and Jung thought that this incident would make the subjects of the Ottomans free. Azoury expressed these views in the final issue of L'Indépendance arabe.
