= Kohsar Tourism Expressway =

Road in Pakistan

Tourism Expressway
- Kohsar Tourism Expressway

Route information
- Length: 123 km (76 mi)

Major junctions
- South end: Rawalpindi
- North end: Muzaffarabad, AJK

Location
- Country: Pakistan

Highway system
- Roads in Pakistan

The Kohsar Tourism Expressway, also known as the Tourism Expressway, is a multi-million rupee project in Pakistan aimed at promoting tourism in the country. The expressway project is planned to connect Rawalpindi to Murree and extend further up to Muzaffarabad in Azad Jammu and Kashmir (AJK). This expressway is intended to offer an alternative route for travelers between significant destinations in the region, particularly catering to tourists.

The project involves the reconstruction and expansion of a 123-kilometre-long (76 mi) road, with an estimated cost of approximately PKR 4.5 billion. Once completed, the road will be widened to 24 feet (7.3 m). The Punjab government has assigned the Frontier Works Organisation (FWO) to undertake this significant project, and they have already received PKR 1.75 billion for commencing the work during the current fiscal year.

This new expressway is expected to have investment and commercial opportunities for both local and international tourists in the region. Alongside the road, plans include constructing high-rise buildings, restaurants, rest stops, and motels, which will contribute to strengthening the local economy and create employment opportunities also.
