= Automobile Year =

Annual automobile and motorsport yearbook

- Editor: ETAI
- Categories: Automobile & motorsport
- Frequency: annually
- Publisher: ETAI
- Founded: 1953
- Country: France
- Language: English, French, German
- Website: Official Site

Automobile Year (formerly as Annual Automobile Review) is a yearbook specialising in automobile and motorsport, published annually in three different languages; English, French (as L'Année Automobile), German (as Auto-Jahr). More recent editions now carry the tagline: "The Annual For Car Enthusiasts". Most recently, from issue 63 in 2015, it is only published in French, as "L'Annee Automobile".

== History ==
The book, then titled Annual Automobile Review was launched in 1953 by Ami Guichard (1921–1986), a Swiss motoring writer and entrepreneur from Lausanne who published it through his company, Edita S.A. He brought along the best writers and photographers he knew including Charles Faroux (the founder of the 24 Hours of Le Mans), Giovanni Lurani and Yves Debraine. One of the other contributor, Bernard Cahier was credited by Guichard for introducing him to the world of motorsport. Unlike the German and French editions, the English edition in 1956 underwent a name change when it became Automobile Year, relegating its original title to the book's subtitle and banishing it the following year.

Jean-Rodolphe Piccard, the book's deputy editor of ten years, replaced Guichard in 1986, following his sudden death, in turn, his publishing company Editions JR took over the running of the book. In 2005 Piccard retired and Christian Philippsen, a Monégasque motoring industry consultant, took over the running of the yearbook. In 2009 ETA-I of France took over publication of the Annual, after purchasing the rights from Christian Philippsen.

== Book content ==
Since its launch, the book is split into three different sections, "Industry", "Motorsport" and "Culture". Following an introduction by the editor, the book begins with a section about the motor industry with news and new car launches. The motorsport section follows, starting with a section on Formula One and highly significant single seater series (A1GP, Indianapolis 500, IRL and Champ Car), followed by endurance racing reviews (24 Hours of Le Mans, Le Mans Series, American Le Mans Series and FIA GT Championship), then touring car racing and finally rallying (World Rally Championship and Dakar Rally). A section for car culture concludes the series.

=== Difference to previous editions ===
Prior to when Philippsen came to the helm, the book was split into two sections, a section featuring new automobile launches and culture and motorsport season reviews with results points table following that.

In the past, sportscar racing had always followed F1, then the US racing scene, rallying, F3000 and finally touring cars ends the section.

The US Open wheel racing coverage, CART in particular, was placed within the US racing section along with NASCAR and the Trans-Am Series, nowadays, it follows the F1 coverage. Despite being a stock car racing series, NASCAR is now placed within the touring car section with WTCC and DTM. Until 1989, these and the IMSA Camel GT series was the only non-FIA events the book covered. The IMSA series, until 1985, was covered within the US racing section, when followed the World Sportscar Championship coverage in their own section.

Until the series demise, the touring car section dealt only the European Touring Car Championship, excepting for 1987 when it covered the World Touring Car Championship. After that, it covered significant European domestic series such as DTM (Deutsche Tourenwagen Meisterschaft).

Also previously featured in its own section was significant FIA European single seater series such as F3000, its precessor F2 and F3.

The book concludes with a race result section, featuring a depth by depth results of each F1 and 24 hours of Le Mans races covered with a points table of FIA series, these are now incorporated into their own section.

== List of Automobile Year editions ==
| Edition | Year | Cover | Managing Editor | English Editor | German Editor | Comments |
|---|---|---|---|---|---|---|
| 1 | 1953/1954 | Indianapolis 500 drawing of winning car | Ami Guichard | | | Available only in softbound. |
| 2 | 1954/1955 | softcover edition has Alfa Romeo BAT7 illustration | Ami Guichard | | | Rarest of all editions. Rumoured that only 800 were believed to be printed and most of those were lost. The loss resulted from a fire at the publishing house in Switzerland in late 1954. Surviving number today is unknown, but hard cover versions with dust cover in good condition, sell on auction sites for approximately US $800. Released in either softback or hardback. |
| 3 | 1955/1956 | dust jacket has 3 illustrations of Mercedes Benz W196 GP, Ferrari sports -racing car & Coachbuilt special | Ami Guichard | Gordon Wilkins | | First to be released exclusively as a hardbound. |
| 4 | 1956/1957 | Montage of Fiat Turbina, Renault Etoile Filante | Ami Guichard | Gordon Wilkins | | English version became "Automobile Year" |
| 5 | 1957/1958 | Technical illustration of Vanwall VW 5 | Ami Guichard | Gordon Wilkins | | |
| 6 | 1958/1959 | | Ami Guichard | Gordon Wilkins | | |
| 7 | 1959/1960 | Stirling Moss & Cooper T51 | Ami Guichard | Gordon Wilkins | | First to use a photograph instead of illustration as a cover |
| 8 | 1960/1961 | Ferrari 250 TR59/60 | Ami Guichard | Gordon Wilkins | | |
| 9 | 1961/1962 | Ferrari 250 TRI/61 | Ami Guichard | Gordon Wilkins | | |
| 10 | 1962/1963 | Graham Hill & BRM P57 | Ami Guichard | Douglas Armstrong | | |
| 11 | 1963/1964 | Jim Clark & Lotus 25 | Ami Guichard | Douglas Armstrong | | |
| 12 | 1964/1965 | AC Cobra | Ami Guichard | Douglas Armstrong | | |
| 13 | 1965/1966 | Jim Clark & Lotus 33 | Ami Guichard | Douglas Armstrong | | |
| 14 | 1966/1967 | Scuderia Filipinetti Ford GT40 | Ami Guichard | Douglas Armstrong | | |
| 15 | 1967/1968 | Denny Hulme & Brabham BT24 | Ami Guichard | Douglas Armstrong | | |
| 16 | 1968/1969 | Graham Hill & Lotus 49B | Ami Guichard | Douglas Armstrong | | |
| 17 | 1969/1970 | Jackie Stewart & Matra MS80 | Ami Guichard | Douglas Armstrong | | |
| 18 | 1970/1971 | Jochen Rindt & Lotus 72C | Ami Guichard | Douglas Armstrong | | |
| 19 | 1971/1972 | Denny Hulme & McLaren M8D | Ami Guichard | Douglas Armstrong | | |
| 20 | 1972/1973 | Emerson Fittipaldi & Lotus 72D | Ami Guichard | Douglas Armstrong | | |
| 21 | 1973/1974 | Jackie Stewart & Tyrrell 005 | Ami Guichard | Douglas Armstrong | | |
| 22 | 1974/1975 | Clay Regazzoni & Ferrari 312B3 | Ami Guichard | Douglas Armstrong | | |
| 23 | 1975/1976 | Niki Lauda & Ferrari 312T | Ami Guichard | Douglas Armstrong | | |
| 25 | 1976/1977 | Jody Scheckter & Tyrrell P34 | Ami Guichard | Douglas Armstrong | | |
| 26 | 1977/1978 | Montage of past 25 editions | Ami Guichard | Douglas Armstrong | | |
| 26 | 1978/1979 | Mario Andretti leads Ronnie Peterson in their Lotus 79 | Ami Guichard | Douglas Armstrong | | |
| 27 | 1979/1980 | Montage of Scheckter in his Ferrari 312T4, Andretti in his Lotus 80 | Ami Guichard | Douglas Armstrong | | |
| 28 | 1980/1981 | Start of the US Grand Prix West | Ami Guichard | Douglas Armstrong | | |
| 29 | 1981/1982 | Nelson Piquet & Brabham BT49C | Ami Guichard | Douglas Armstrong | | |
| 30 | 1982/1983 | Gold and chrome body panel | Ami Guichard | Ian Norris | | |
| 31 | 1983/1984 | Illustration of a driver in a Formula One car cornering | Ami Guichard | Ian Norris | | |
| 32 | 1984/1985 | Alain Prost & McLaren MP4/2 | Ami Guichard | Ian Norris | | |
| 33 | 1985/1986 | Illustrated reflection of a Porsche 944, showing a Renault F1 driver standing toward his car. | Ami Guichard | | | |
| 34 | 1986/1987 | Nigel Mansell & Williams FW11 | Jean-Rodolphe Piccard | | | |
| 35 | 1987/1988 | concept car | Jean-Rodolphe Piccard | David Hodges | | |
| 36 | 1988/1989 | Italdesign Aztec | Jean-Rodolphe Piccard | David Hodges | | |
| 37 | 1989/1990 | Honda NSX | Jean-Rodolphe Piccard | David Hodges | | |
| 38 | 1990/1991 | Bertone Nivola | Jean-Rodolphe Piccard | David Hodges | | |
| 39 | 1991/1992 | concept car | Jean-Rodolphe Piccard | Ian Norris | | |
| 40 | 1992/1993 | Audi Avus quattro | Jean-Rodolphe Piccard | Ian Norris | | |
| 41 | 1993/1994 | Isdera Commendatore 112i | Jean-Rodolphe Piccard | Ian Norris | | |
| 42 | 1994/1995 | Dodge Viper GTS & Dodge Ram; Ferrari F355 (alternative) | Jean-Rodolphe Piccard | Ian Norris | | |
| 43 | 1995/1996 | Ford GT90; Alfa Romeo GTV (alternative) | Jean-Rodolphe Piccard | Ian Norris | | |
| 44 | 1996/1997 | Ford Indigo | Jean-Rodolphe Piccard | Ian Norris | | |
| 45 | 1997/1998 | Alfa Romeo Scighera | Jean-Rodolphe Piccard | Ian Norris | | |
| 46 | 1998/1999 | Audi TT | Jean-Rodolphe Piccard | Ian Norris | | |
| 47 | 1999/2000 | SEAT Formula | Jean-Rodolphe Piccard | Ian Norris | | |
| 48 | 2000/2001 | Jaguar F-Type | Jean-Rodolphe Piccard | Ian Norris | | |
| 49 | 2001/2002 | Spyker C8 | Jean-Rodolphe Piccard | Ian Norris | | |
| 50 | 2002/2003 | Montage of past 50 covers | Jean-Rodolphe Piccard | Ian Norris | | |
| 51 | 2003/2004 | headlight | Jean-Rodolphe Piccard | Ian Norris | | |
| 52 | 2004/2005 | Koenigsegg CCR | Jean-Rodolphe Piccard | Ian Norris | | |
| 53 | 2005/2006 | Maserati Birdcage 75th | Christian Philippsen | Ian Norris | | |
| 54 | 2006/2007 | Design sketch of a Ferrari concept car | Christian Philippsen | Ian Norris | | |
| 55 | 2007/2008 | Mazda Ryuga | Christian Philippsen | Ian Norris | | |
| 56 | 2008/2009 | Honda concept car | Christian Philippsen | | | |
| 57 | 2009/2010 | Ferrari 458 Italia | Serge Bellu | | | |
| 58 | 2010/2011 | Venturi America EV | Serge Bellu | | | |
| 59 | 2011/2012 | Citroën DS4 | Serge Bellu | | | |
| 60 | 2012/2013 | Jaguar F-Type | Serge Bellu | | | |
| 61 | 2013/2014 | McLaren P1 | Serge Bellu | | | |
| 62 | 2014/2015 | Mercedes-AMG GT | Serge Bellu | | | |
| 63 | 2015/2016 | Ferrari 488 Spider | Serge Bellu | | | Ceased publishing in English and German.Published only in French under the original title " L'Annee Automobile". |

== Past contributors ==
- John Fitch (1954)
- Paul Frère (1954)
- Denis Jenkinson (1955)
- Giovanni Lurani (1954)
- Gordon Murray
- Jacques Ickx
- Günther Molter
- Federico Kirbus (1955)
- José Rosinski (editor in chief 1972–1973, 1976)
