= Le Moderniste Illustré =

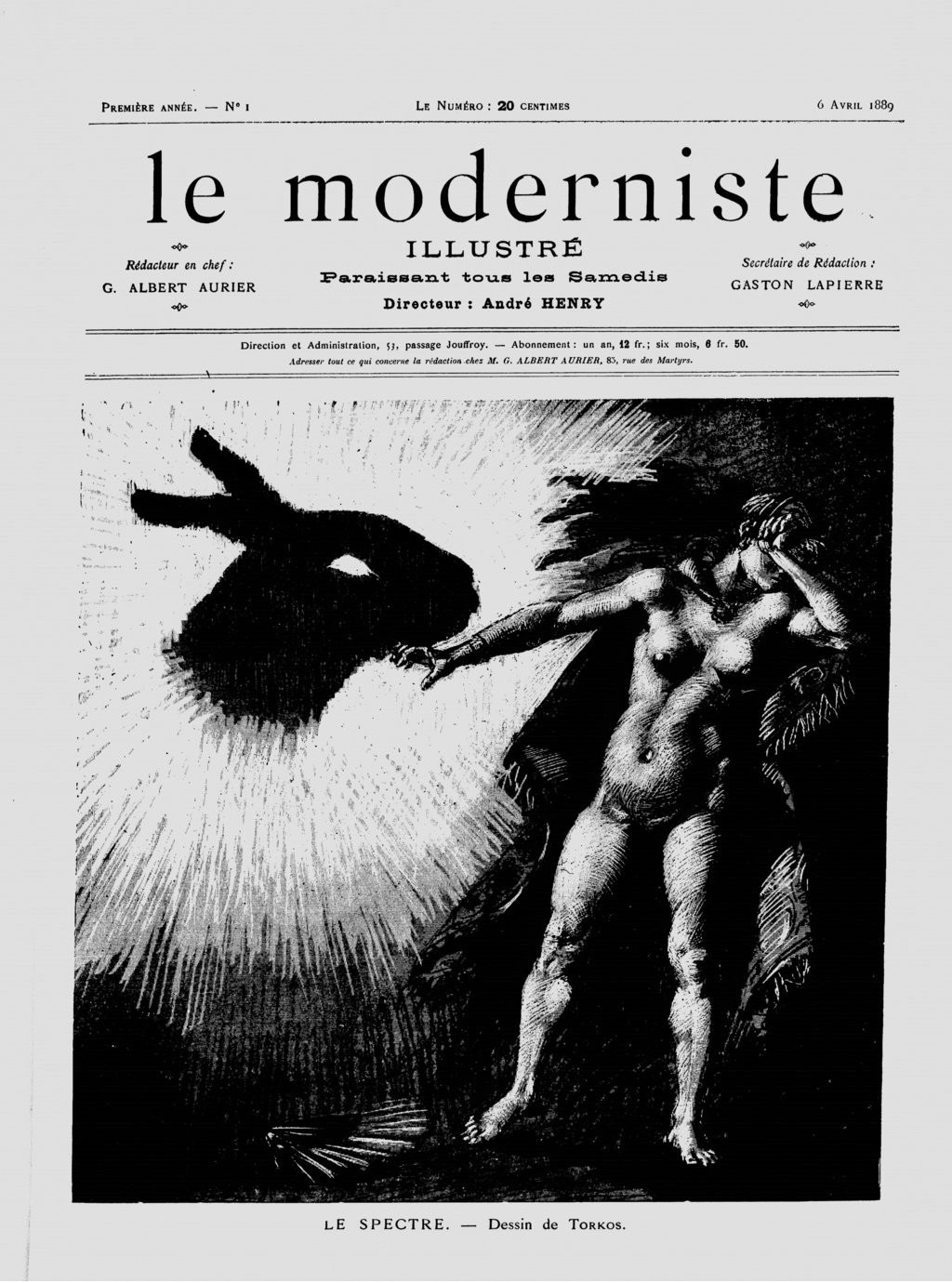
Front page of the first issue

Le Moderniste Illustré was a short-lived French illustrated weekly published in Paris on Saturdays from 6 April to 28 September 1889. A total of 23 issues were produced on modernist art and literature. The editor-in-chief was André Henry and the managing editor was Albert Aurier. Issues were sold for 20 centimes. The complete run was reprinted in facsimile by Slatkine Reprints in Geneva in 1971.

The journal is primarily remembered for Aurier's favourable early critique of the, then obscure, artist Vincent van Gogh. In Le Moderniste he described Van Gogh's paintings as "tremendous in their ardor, intensity, sunshine." Aurier would later go on to champion the work of Van Gogh in Mercure de France.
