= Le Téméraire =

Le Téméraire was a children's comic magazine in France during World War II, published by Les Editions Coloniales et Métropolitaines.

== History ==
Established by French schoolteacher Jacques Bousquet, it was first published in January 1943, and received its foothold in the French press as other children's publications closed due to paper rationing; the Nazi authorities officially allowed Le Téméraire to use paper, while other publications had not. Clare Tufts, the author of "Vincent Krassousky-Nazi Collaborator or Naïve Cartoonist?", stated that it had "quality graphics" and that the paper and ink used were "good". Therefore, it, according to Tufts, "made a significant impact" as it, especially in the Paris metropolitan area, had a "monopoly" in the youth comics market.

The founder had associations with the group Jeunes du Maréchal. The writers and editors were all French, and the publisher, which was located in the same building as the publication of the Nazi occupying authorities, was, according to the accounting books, funded entirely with French capital. Author Pascal Ory in his book Le Petit Nazi Illustré stated that the Nazi occupying forces, in Tufts's words, "approved or at least tolerated" the publication even though its creators were French.

The publication had 38 regular issues and three special issues, and its circulation was 200,000. Its comics fell in line with Nazi ideology, promoting racial purity, praising the Nazi Aryan ideal by making those characters protagonists, and denigrating the enemies of Nazi Germany, including Russia, the United Kingdom, and the United States, as well as people of non-Aryan backgrounds, as they were made antagonists. The publication sponsored 70 clubs which organized recreational activities for children. One of them, "Le Cercle des Téméraires," had a membership in the thousands.

From the beginning the comics of Vincent Krassousky, with the Vica sailor character, were published in Le Téméraire, with all issues having full Vica stories except for Issue 12. According to Tufts, the Vica comics were "far less offensive" compared to much of the remaining content.

Publication ended on August 1, 1944.
