= Objectif et action Mutualistes =

- Categories: Lifestyle magazine
- Frequency: Bimonthly
- Circulation: 336,925 (2014)
- Founded: 1979
- Country: France
- Based in: Paris
- Language: French
- Website: Mutualistes
- ISSN: 0243-9700
- OCLC: 473426970

Objectif et action Mutualistes, or simply Mutualistes, is a French language bimonthly family magazine published in France.

== History and profile ==
Objectif et action Mutualistes was established in 1979. The magazine is published on a bimonthly basis. Its headquarters is in Paris.

The circulation of the magazine was 363,010 copies in 2013 and 336,925 copies in 2014.
