= Hayal Köksal =

Hayal Köksal (Balıkesir, Turkey 1956) is a Turkish instructor giving lectures at Boğaziçi University, Yeditepe University and Bahçeşehir University. She graduated from Izmir Teachers' Training College in 1976, and Faculty of Education in Marmara University in 1985. She received her MA in English Language Teaching in 1992, and Ph.D. from Gaziantep University.

She has been dealing with Total Quality in Education since 1992, after in 2000 co-founded the Turkish Center for Schools of Quality with world-wide renowned quality expert John Jay Bonsting. She has given courses at various outstanding Turkish Universities as a part-time instructor as a way of publicizing quality-oriented education, and working as an educational quality consultant, researcher, and book writer. Köksal wrote seven books about Total Quality in Education and publishes her research results in papers at national and international conferences.

Köksal is a coordinator at the Innovative Teachers project of Microsoft Turkey and is also trying to publicize the Students' Quality Circles (Imece Circles) philosophy, at Turkish schools. She conducted nearly 200 circles till the end of 2006.
