= Albert Aurier =

French artist and art collector (1865–1892)

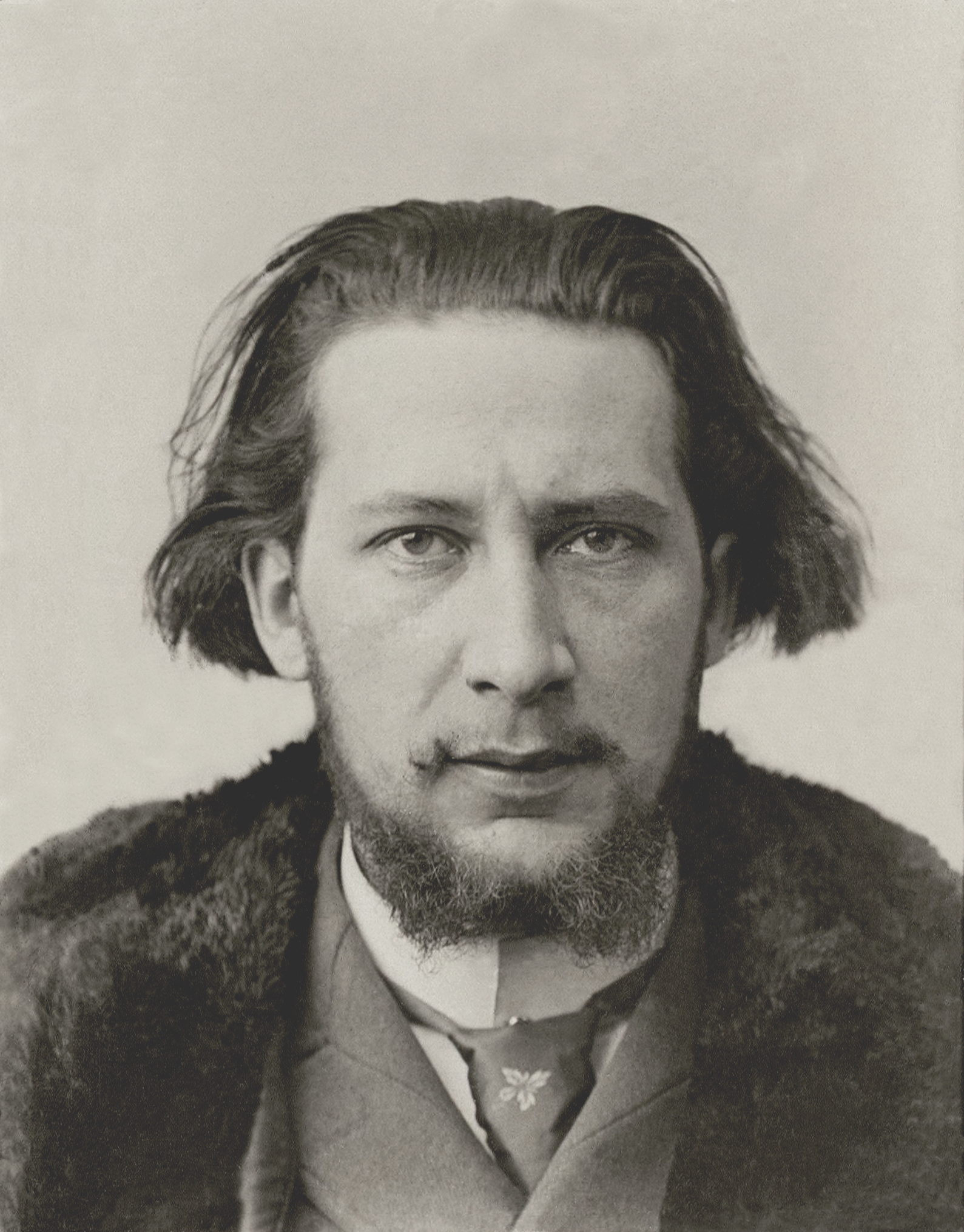
- Aurier, c. 1890.
- Born: Gabriel-Albert Aurier; 5 May 1865; Châteauroux, Indre, France
- Died: 5 October 1892 (aged 27); Paris, France

Gabriel-Albert Aurier (5 May 1865 – 5 October 1892) was a French poet, art critic and painter, associated with the Symbolist movement.

== Career ==
The son of a notary born in Châteauroux, Indre, Aurier went to Paris in 1883 to study law, but his attention was soon drawn to art and literature; he then began to contribute to Symbolist periodicals. He reviewed the annual Salon in Le Décadent, later contributed to La Plume and, in 1889, was the managing editor of Le Moderniste Illustré. From its foundation in 1890, he contributed to the Mercure de France, which published the essays on which Aurier's fame was founded: "Les Isolés: Vincent van Gogh" and "Le Symbolisme en peinture: Paul Gauguin".

After a trip to Marseille, Aurier died at the age of twenty-seven in Paris, on 5 October 1892, from a typhus infection. The next day, friends, writers and artists accompanied his coffin on the funeral train departing from the Gare d'Orsay for Châteauroux, where his remains were entombed in the family grave.

Six months after his death, in April 1893, his friends published his collected writings (Œuvres posthumes), edited by the Mercure de France.

== Art collecting ==
Most of the Van Gogh paintings from Aurier's collection were acquired by Helene Kröller-Müller, and are now in the collections of the Kröller-Müller Museum, Otterlo (The Netherlands). Works by other artists from Aurier's estate - Émile Bernard, A. Fourmon, by unknown artists and Aurier himself - were first on public view in Paris, in 1960.

== Selected art criticism ==
- Les Isolés: Vincent van Gogh, Mercure de France, January 1890, pp. 24-29 English translation
- Le Symbolisme en peinture: Paul Gauguin, Mercure de France, March 1891, pp. 155-165
- Les Symbolistes, Revue encyclopédique 2, 1 April 1892, pp. 474–486, illustrated
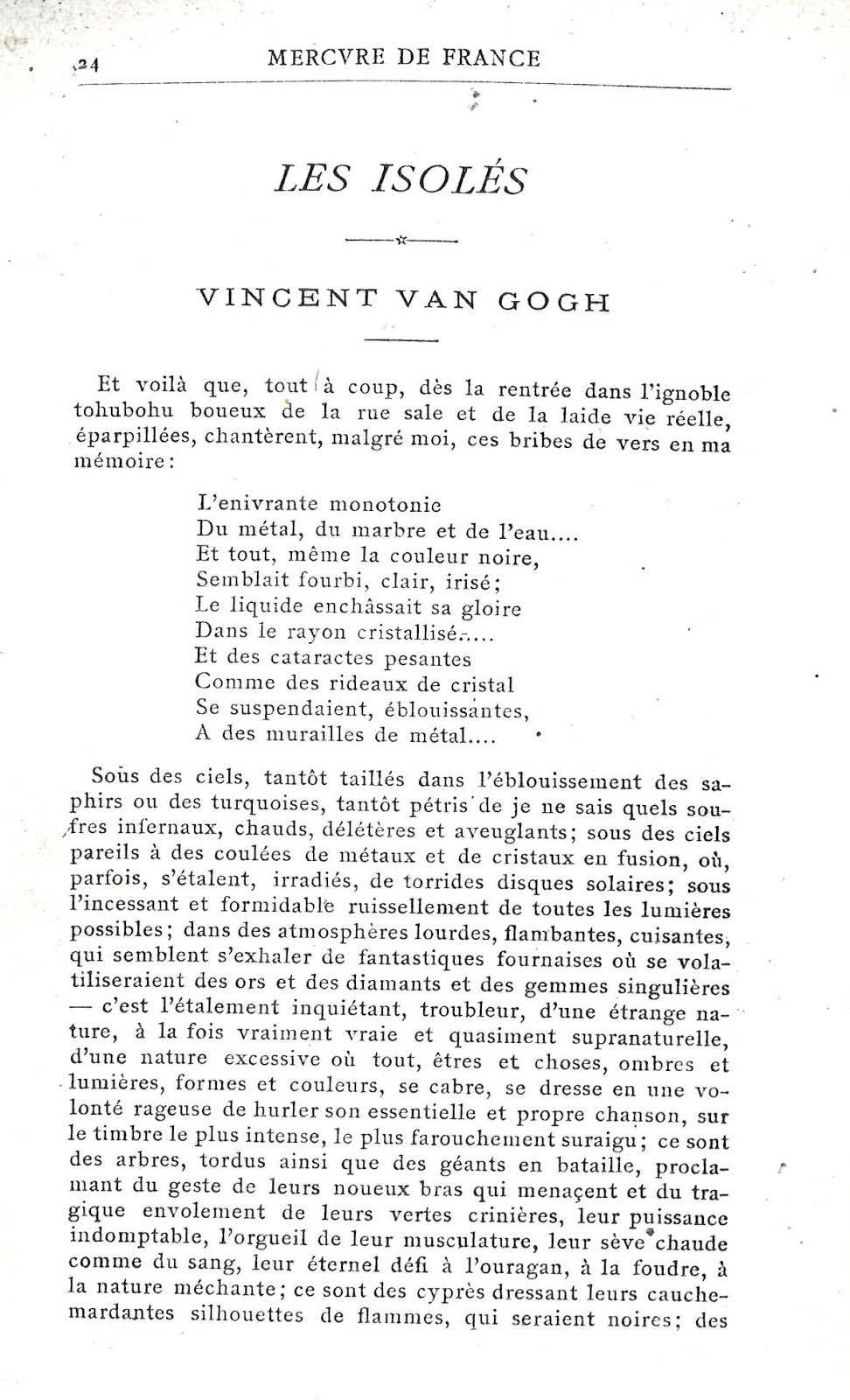
Gabriel Albert Aurier: Les isolés, article praising Vincent van Gogh, Mercure de France, January 1890.

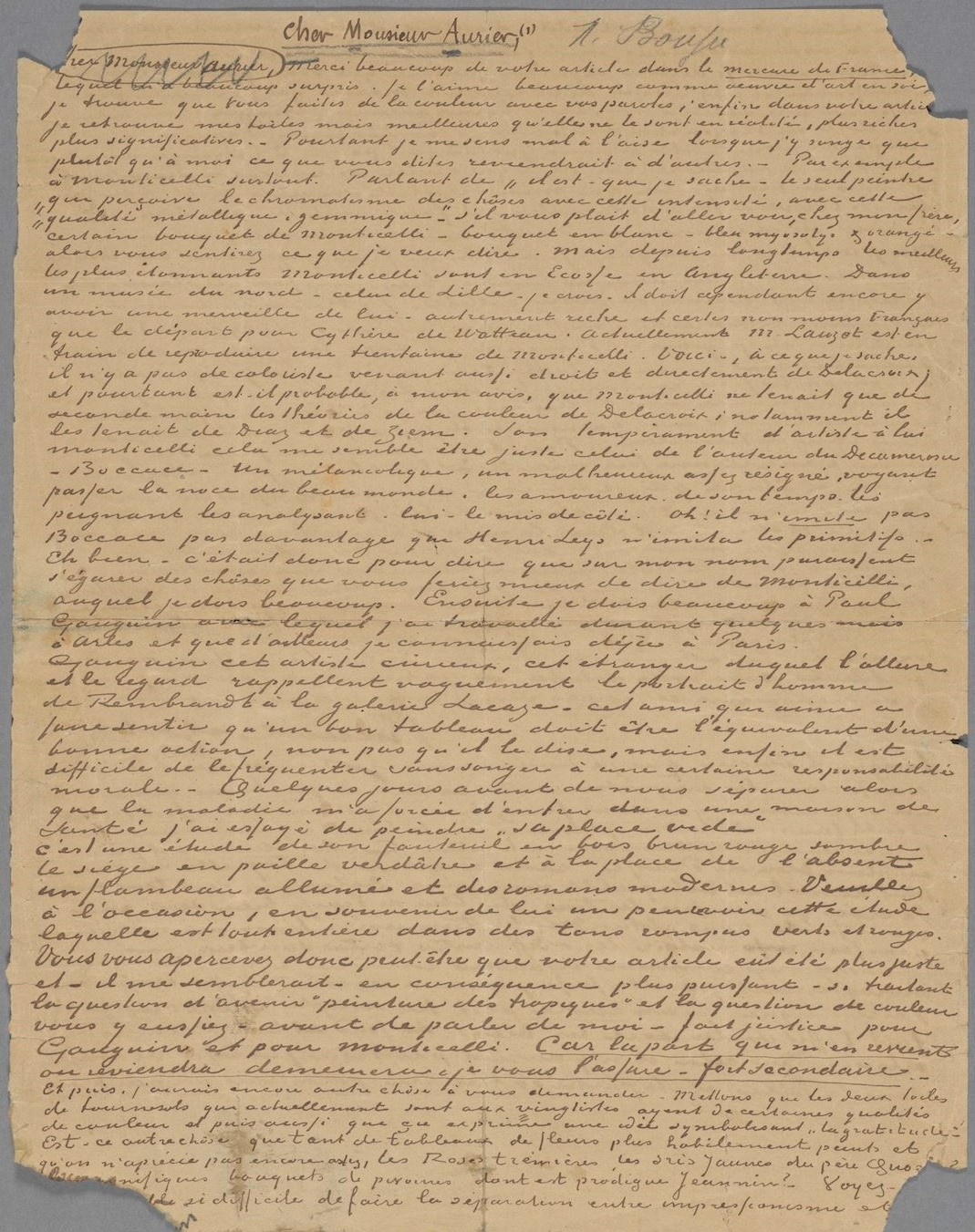
Vincent van Gogh: Letter to Albert Aurier, 8 or 9 February 1890.

== References and sources ==
Sources

- Monneret, Sophie (1979). L'impressionisme et son époque, dictionnaire international. Paris: Denoël. ISBN 2-221-05222-6.
- Lunn, Margaret Rauschenbach (15 October 1982). "G.-Albert Aurier, Critic and Theorist of Symbolist Art" (PDF) (PhD thesis). Massachusetts Institute of Technology. Archived from the original (PDF) on 4 June 2011.
