= Cibles =

French military magazine

- Editor in Chief: Éric Bondoux
- Categories: Military, civilian firearms, militaria
- Frequency: Monthly
- Publisher: Crépin-Leblond
- Founded: 1967; 59 years ago
- Company: Édition Crépin-Leblond
- Country: France
- Based in: Paris
- Language: French
- Website: www.crepin-leblond.fr
- ISSN: 0009-6679

Cibles is a French magazine that publishes articles about firearms and militaria. The magazine was launched in 1967. Its publisher is Crépin-Leblond. It is sold at newsstands in Belgium, France, and Switzerland.
