= Basket News =

French basketball magazine

- Type: Magazine (till 2013), Tabloid
- Owner: Tomar Press
- Founder: Antonio Asensio Pizarro
- Editor: Fabien Friconnet
- Founded: 2000; 26 years ago
- Ceased publication: 2013
- Language: French
- Headquarters: Paris
- Country: France
- ISSN: 1271-4534

Basket News was a weekly French magazine about basketball. In 2008, the magazine merged with Maxi-Basket. On April 3, 2013, after releasing its 643rd issue, it was switched to a tabloid format.

Basket News was covering all the latest news, including coverage of French, European, and American championships, as well as major events.

== History ==
Following the liquidation of the publisher of the newspaper Basket Hebdo (created in 1996), the editorial team was reunited to relaunch a weekly newspaper dedicated to basketball. The project culminated in 2000 with the launch of Basket News.

In 2008, Basket News acquired and merged with Maxi-Basket and MVP Basket. Maxi-Basket changed its name to Maxi Basket-News, and adopted a new version, still dedicated to French basketball news with a monthly publication.

MVP Basket also changed its name to Basket News America (BAM), the magazine's content still being dedicated to American basketball, also with a monthly publication.

The new versions of these magazines appeared for the first time on October 3, 2008. At the same time, the weekly Basket News continued its publication with a new presentation.

== Basketball awards ==
From the 1996-97 onwards the editorial team of Basket Hebdo that later created the Basket News magazine, started organising awards for the best European, American and U-22 player in Europe and also best European in NBA.

In 1997-98 a jury of 55 European journalists from 19 countries voted the best players in Europe. Dejan Bodiroga won the European player of the year a record 4 times.

The winners were determined via a readers' poll.

Best European player

- 1997-98: Predrag Danilovic
- 1998-99:
- 1999-00: Dejan Bodiroga
- 2000-01: Dejan Bodiroga
- 2001-02: Dejan Bodiroga
- 2002-03: Dejan Bodiroga (4)

Best American player

- 1997-98: Dominique Wilkins
- 1998-99: Tyus Edney
- 1999-00:
- 2000-01: Alphonso Ford
- 2001-02: Tyus Edney
- 2002-03: Tyus Edney (3)

Best Young European player (U22)

- 2000-01: Luis Scola
- 2001-02: Sofoklis Schortsianitis
- 2002-03: Antonis Fotsis

Best European in NBA

- 2002-03: Dirk Nowitzki

== See also ==
- Eurobasket.com
