= Femmes françaises =

Communist feminist magazine in France (1944–1957)

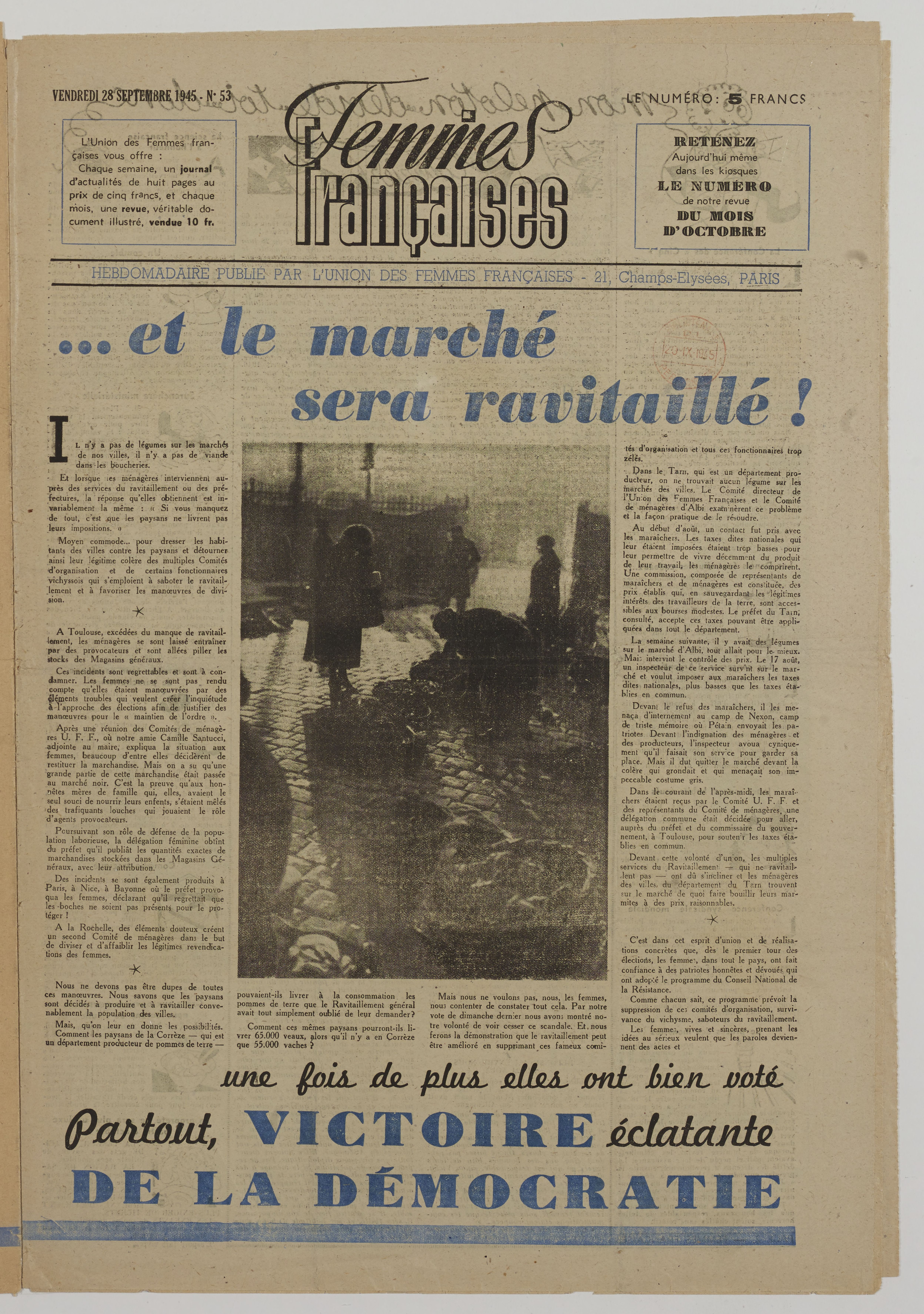
Front page of Femmes françaises dated 28 Septembre 1945

Femmes françaises (French: French women) was a feminist and communist women's magazine which was launched in 1944 and was the publication of the feminist social movement Femmes solidaires. The publisher of the magazine was France d'abord. The magazine was published on a weekly basis. In 1948 the magazine sold 5,600 copies. It ceased publication in 1957 and was succeeded by another feminist magazine, Clara.

From October 1949 to May 1952 Élise Fraysse was redactor in chief of Femmes françaises. Her coverage of events leading to Tunisian independence resulted in her imprisonment in 1952.
