= L'Europe orientale (Paris, 1919) =

Defunct French political magazine

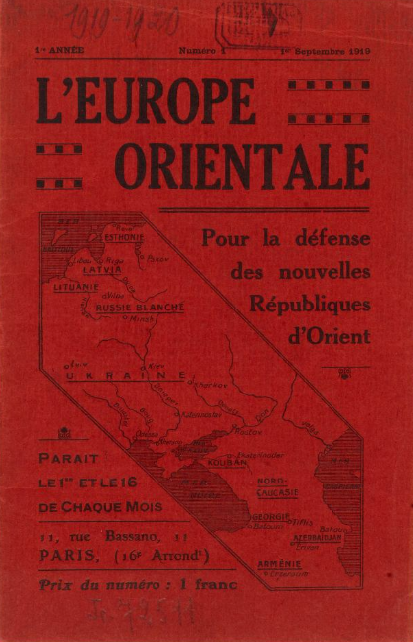
The first issue of L'Europe orientale - the map depicting the "Allogenian" lands of Estonia, Latvia, Lithuania, White Russia, Ukraine, Kuban, North Caucasus, Georgia, Azerbaijan and Armenia

L'Europe orientale: pour la defense des Nouvelles Républiques d'Orient (Eastern Europe: for the defense of the New Republics of the East) was a bi-monthly magazine published in Paris from September 1919 to January 1920. Separate print editions were issued in French and English, the latter carrying the title The Eastern Europe. L'Europe orientale campaigned for recognition of the "Allogenian nations" (i.e. the non-Russian nations in the border lands) by the Entente during the Paris Peace Conference. The publication was distributed in the United States, Canada and Switzerland.

The first issue of L'Europe orientale was published on 1 September 1919. Mykhailo Hrushevsky was the founder of the publication. It served as an organ of Hrushevsky's Committee of Independent Ukraine. F. Savchenko served as the chief editor of the magazine whilst G. Hutin was the managing editor, but effectively Hrushevsky and D. Issaievytch managed the editorial affairs of the publication. The magazine was supported economically by the Ukrainian National Committee in America, other Ukrainians in the United States, the Extraordinary Diplomatic Mission of the Ukrainian People's Republic in France and the Ukrainian National Council in Paris. The editorial committee consisted of both Ukrainian representatives (Hrushevsky, Issaievytch, Savchenko, Mykhailo Lozynsky) and personalities representing other East European nations. In the latter category, the most prominent participant was P. Tyrsa from the Kuban People's Republic. The publication was printed by Lang, Blanchong & Cie.

The last issue of L'Europe orientale (no. 9–10) was published on 16 January 1920. The magazine ceased publication due to financial difficulties and the shift of the Committee of Independent Ukraine from Paris to Prague.
