= Hayal =

Satirical magazine (1873–1895)

- Editor: Theodoros Kasapis
- Categories: Satirical magazine
- Founder: Theodoros Kasapis
- Founded: 1875
- First issue: 30 October 1875
- Final issue: 1895
- Country: Ottoman Empire; France; United Kingdom of Great Britain and Ireland
- Based in: Istanbul; Paris; London
- Language: Turkish

Hayal (Turkish: Illusion) was one of the satirical periodicals established and published by the Ottoman Greek journalist Theodoros Kasapis. The magazine was published in Istanbul between 1873 and 1877 with some interruptions. Kasapis had to leave the Ottoman Empire in 1877 and continued to publish Hayal first in Paris and then in London until 1895.

== History and profile ==
Hayal was initiated by Theodoros Kasapis, and its first issue appeared on 30 October 1873. The magazine had four editions. Its Greek edition was named as O Mauoç’u, and its French edition was titled as Polichinelle. Kheyal was its Turkish edition with the Armenian letters which produced 10 issues. Hayal also had a Bulgarian edition first named as Şutos and then Kosturka. Hayal was the first Ottoman satirical magazine which employed editorial cartoons produced by Nisan Berberyan. Kasapis's aim in using these cartoons was to reinforce the views expressed in his editorials.

Throughout its existence Hayal was banned by the Ottoman authorities many times. The magazine permanently folded by the government on 19 June 1877 after the issue 323 due to its critical cartoons. Theodoros Kasapis went into exile shortly after the closure of Hayal and restarted the magazine in Paris in 1878. Hayal moved to London where it appeared until 1895.
