= List of German women's magazines =

This is a list of German women's magazines.

== Mass market magazines ==
- Amica
- Auf einen Blick
- Bild der Frau
- Brigitte, published by Gruner + Jahr
  - Brigitte Woman
  - Brigitte Young Miss
- Frau im Spiegel
- Freundin, published by Hubert Burda Media
- Für Sie, published in Hamburg by Jahreszeiten Verlag
- Gala, published by Gruner + Jahr
- Das Goldene Blatt, published by WAZ Women Group
- Jolie, published by OZ Druck und Verlag
- Joy, published by Marquard Media AG
- Madame
- Maxi
- Myself
- Neue Post
- Petra
- Woman

No longer published:

- Allegra
- Journal für die Frau

== Feminist magazines ==
- Femina Politica, first published in 1997
- Missy Magazine, first published in 2008

No longer published:

- Beiträge zur feministischen Theorie und Praxis, published 1978-2008
- Die Hexenpresse – Zeitschrift für feministische Agitation, published 1972-1976
- Der Weg der Frau, feminist/communist magazine published 1931-1933

== German editions of foreign magazines ==
- Cosmopolitan
- Elle
- Glamour
- Grazia
- InStyle
- Vogue

Unsure of publication status:

- Elle Girl
