= List of magazines in Indonesia =

This is a list of leading magazines published in Indonesia. It is divided into those local to Indonesia, and those that are Indonesian editions of internationally published titles.

== Local titles ==
- Bali News
- Clear - Citibank-backed finance and lifestyle magazine
- Indonesia Expat - previously Jakarta Expat and Bali Expat
- Bali Plus Magazine

=== Business ===
- SWA
- Globe Asia
- Marketing
- Marketeers
- Investor
- MIX
- Infobank
- Warta Ekonomi
- Ide Bisnis
- Info Franchise
- Komite.id
- Peluang
- Inspiratif
- Foodservice Today
- Luar Biasa
- Jurnal Maritim
- Yokatta

=== Agriculture ===
- Trubus
- Trobos Livestock
- Trobos Aqua
- Agrina
- Media Perkebunan
- Poultry Indonesia
- Aqua Indonesia
- Infovet
- Agro Farm
- Sawit
- Info Akuakultur
- Hortus Archipelago
- Tebar

=== General ===
- Intisari

=== News ===
- Gatra
- Sindo Weekly
- Tempo
- Forum
- Gema
- Konstan
- Gamma
- Panji
- Sinar
- Editor
- Ummat
- Tajuk
- DR
- Intelijen
- Aktuil
- Tiras
- Sketsmasa
- Garda

=== Religion ===
- Suara Muhammadiyah - Islam
- Suara Hidayatullah - Islam
- Aula - Islam
- Inspirasi - Protestant
- Bahana - Protestant
- Hidup Katolik - Catholic
- Sabili - Islam
- Hidayah - Islam
- Risalah - Islam
- Risalah Hati - Islam
- Saksi - Islam
- Inthilaq - Islam
- Gontor - Islam
- As-Sunnah - Islam
- Ishlah - Islam
- Alkisah - Islam
- Amanah - Islam
- Utusan - Catholic
- Al Furqon - Islam
- Suara 'Aisyiyah - Islam
- Wartam - Hindu
- Hindu Times - Hindu
- Media Hindu - Hindu
- Harmoni - Buddha
- Variasari - Islam
- Al-Wa'ie - Islam
- Hikayah - Islam
- Muzakki - Islam

=== Women ===
- Asjraq (1925–1930s)
- Beauty & Hair
- Chic
- Cita Cinta
- Famili
- Female
- Femina
- Isteri Soesila–Taman Moeslimah (1924–1926)
- Kartika
- Kartini
- Kirana
- La Jang
- Liberty
- Nirmala
- Oops!
- Panasea
- Pesona
- Poetri Hindia (1908–1912)
- Prodo
- Sarinah
- Sartika
- Selecta
- Sekar
- Swara Cantika
- Tiara
- Varia

=== Teen ===
- HighEnd Teen
- Kawanku
- Gadis
- Aneka Yess!
- Hai
- GoGirl!
- Looks
- Story
- Mode
- Anita
- Cool n Smart
- Poster
- Midi
- GFresh!

=== Children ===
- Mombi
- Mombi SD
- Bobo
- Bobo Junior
- Girls
- Just for Kids
- CathKids
- Kreatif
- XY Kids
- Aku Anak Saleh
- Mentari
- Oki nirmala
- Ananda
- Cilukba
- Cilukba Junior
- Zaidan
- Azka
- Ino
- CIA
- Tomtom
- Bravo!
- Yunior

=== Health ===
- Panasea
- Fit
- Healthy Life

=== Family ===
- Ayahbunda

=== Housing ===
- Idea
- Asri
- Laras

=== Computer ===
- Info Komputer

=== Fashion ===
- HighEnd
- Dewi
- Prestige Indonesia
- Kebaya
- Noor
- Alia
- Annisa
- Ummi
- Hijabella
- Paras
- Laiqa
- Scarf
- Muslimah
- Mabrur

=== Men's lifestyle ===
- Popular
- BBm
- X2
- U
- Oke

=== Sports ===
- BolaVaganza
- Sportif
- Main Basket
- Otosport
- Liga Italia
- Liga Inggris
- Olympic
- Raket
- 90Menit
- Sportmania

=== Travel & Lifestyle ===
- Panorama
- Destin Asian
- Travel Treasures Asia
- Venue
- Tamasya
- Travel Fotografi

=== Mystery ===
- Misteri

=== Film ===
- Cinemags
- Film
- Movie Monthly

=== Literature ===
- Horison

=== Automotive ===
- Auto Expert
- MotoMaxx
- Motor
- Scooteriz
- Retroisme
- R2
- Target Car
- Mobil Laku
- OtoBikes
- Moto Bike
- Hot Import Nights
- Motoriders

=== Aviation ===
- Angkasa
- Airmagz

=== Music ===
- kOrt
- Trax
- News Musik
- Hot Chord
- Rockstar

=== Education ===
- Campus
- Fajar Pendidikan
- Alfikr

=== Entertainment ===
- TV Vista
- Film
- Showbiz

=== Technology ===
- Audiopro
- Teknologi
- Teknik Konstruksi
- Konstruksi
- Defender
- Selular
- Forsel
- Equipment Indonesia
- Techno Konstruksi
- HandPHONE

=== Comedy ===
- Humor
- Zaman

=== Wedding ===
- Bridestory
- Weddingku

=== Cooking ===
- Sedap
- Bareca
- Pastry & Bakery
- Selera

=== Gaming ===
- Hot Game
- Zigma
- GameStation

=== Regional ===
- Manglé (Sundanese language)
- Panjebar Semangat (Javanese language)
- Jaya Baya
- Sidogiri
- Djaka Lodang (Javanese language)
- Damar Jati
- Sagang
- Tatap
- Makassar Terkini

== International titles ==
- Anime Insider Indonesia - folded 2011
- Animonster - folded September 2014
- Auto Bild Indonesia - folded 2017
- Autocar Indonesia
- Bobo Indonesia
- Charlie & Lola Indonesia
- CHIP Indonesia
- Cleo Indonesia
- Komputer Aktif
- CosmoGirl Indonesia - teen women's lifestyle magazine - folded 2017
- Cosmopolitan Indonesia - women's lifestyle magazine
- DA MAN Indonesia
- Disney Princess Indonesia
- Elle Indonesia - fashion and women's lifestyle magazine
- Esquire Magazine Indonesia
- Eve Magazine Indonesia
- F1 Racing Indonesia
- FHM Indonesia - folded 2017
- Forbes Indonesia
- GameStation - folded December 2016
- GADGET+ - folded October 2016
- Girlfriend Indonesia
- Golf Digest Indonesia
- Good Housekeeping Indonesia
- HanaLaLa - Indonesian joint edition of Hana to Yume and LaLa manga magazines
- HairIdeas Indonesia
- Harper's Bazaar Indonesia - fashion magazine
- Hello! Indonesia
- In the Night Garden Indonesia
- Indesign Indonesia - Indonesia's leading architecture and design magazine
- Indonesian Tatler - spinoff of Tatler
- Livingetc Indonesia - Indonesia's bestselling modern home magazine
- Macworld Indonesia
- Male Indonesia
- Maxim Indonesia
- Men's Fitness Indonesia
- Men's Health Indonesia - men's health, fitness and lifestyle magazine
- Mother and Baby Indonesia
- National Geographic Indonesia
- Nylon Indonesia
- Nylon Guys Indonesia
- Parenting Indonesia - parenting magazine
- PC Magazine Indonesia
- Playboy Indonesia - ceased publishing in March 2007 after threats by extremist groups
- Reader's Digest Indonesia - lifestyle magazine
- Rolling Stone Indonesia
- Seventeen Indonesia - teen women's lifestyle magazine
- Shonen Magz Indonesia - manga comics, folded in July 2013
- Shonen Star Indonesia - manga comics, folded in 2013
- Solitaire Indonesia
- Travel Treasures Asia - www.traveltreasures.co.id
- Top Gear Indonesia
- Wizard Magazine Indonesia
- WOW Indonesia

== See also ==
- Media of Indonesia
- List of newspapers in Indonesia
