= List of women's magazines =

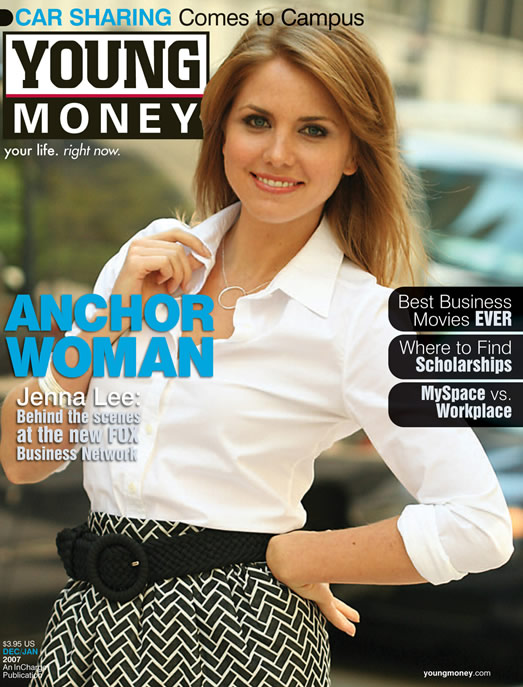
Young Money magazine, January 2007. Cover story features Jenna Lee of Fox Business Network.

This is a list of women's magazines from around the world. These are magazines that have been published primarily for a readership of women.

== Currently published ==
- 10 Magazine (UK – distributed worldwide)
- Al Jamila (Saudi Arabia)
- Allure (US)
- Alt for Damerne (Denmark)
- Amina (France and Africa)
- An an (Japan)
- ASOS.com Magazine (online)
- The Australian Women's Weekly
- Avantages (France)
- Azerbaijan gadini (Azerbaijan)
- Bella (UK)
- Best (UK)
- Better Homes and Gardens (US and Australia)
- Bild der Frau (Germany)
- Bis (Japan)
- Brigitte (Germany)
- Burda Style (Germany)
- Bust (US)
- Bustle (US)
- Canadian Living
- Candis (UK)
- Chat (UK)
- Chatelaine (Canada)
- Cittá Bella (Taiwan)
- Claudia (Poland)
- Closer (UK and France)
- Cosmopolitan (US-based)
- Croissant (Japan)
- Curve
- Damernas Värld (Sweden)
- Darling (US)
- Diva (UK)
- Donna Moderna (Italy)
- Elle
- elle (Brazil)
- Essence (US)
- Evie Magazine (US)
- Ettelaat-e Banuvan (Iran)
- Familie Journalen (Denmark)
- Femina (Denmark)
- Femina (India)
- Femme Actuelle (France)
- Femmes d'Aujourd'hui (Belgium)
- First for Women (US)
- Fucsia (Colombia)
- Gael (Belgium)
- Genevieve Magazine (Nigeria)
- Gloria (Croatia)
- Good Housekeeping (US and UK)
- Grand Hotel (Italy)
- Grazia (Italian-based)
- Gynaika (Greece)
- Hänt Extra (Sweden)
- Harper's Bazaar
- Harrods Magazine (UK)
- Heat (UK)
- Hello! (UK)
- HGTV Magazine (US)
- Hia (Saudi Arabia)
- In Touch Weekly (US)
- InStyle
- IO Donna (Italy)
- JJ (Japan)
- Kotiliesi (Finland)
- Kvinner og Klær (Norway)
- LaIsha (Israel)
- Lepota & Zdravlje (Serbia)
- Life & Style (US)
- Lonny (US)
- Love It! (UK)
- Lucire (New Zealand)
- Madame Figaro (France)
- Margriet (Netherlands)
- Marie Claire
- Martha Stewart Living (US)
- MaryJanesFarm (US)
- Me Naiset (Finland)
- Moondance (online)
- Ms. (US)
- My Weekly (UK)
- Naj (Poland)
- Nargis (Azerbaijan)
- Nesf El Donya (Egypt)
- new! (London, France)
- New Idea (Australia)
- New Woman (India)
- New Zealand Woman's Weekly
- Nők Lapja (Hungary)
- Nona (Malaysia)
- OK! (UK celebrity)
- Olivia (Finland)
- The People's Friend (UK)
- Pick Me Up! (UK)
- Plaza Kvinna (Sweden)
- Pleine Vie (France)
- Prima (UK)
- Pronto (Spain)
- Rabotnitsa (Soviet Union)
- Real People (UK)
- Real Simple (US)
- Sakhi (Karnataka, India)
- Sayidaty (Saudi Arabia)
- Shape (US)
- Star (UK)
- Stylist (UK)
- Suitcase (magazine) (UK)
- Take a Break (UK)
- Tatler (UK)
- Telva (Spain)
- Texas Family (US)
- That's Life! (UK)
- Vanitha (India)
- Veckorevyn (Sweden)
- Verve (India)
- Vintage Life (UK)
- VIVmag (online)
- Vogue
- W (US)
- With (Japan; has Chinese version)
- Woman (UK)
- Woman & Home (UK)
- Womankind (Australia)
- Woman's Day (Australia)
- Woman's Day (US)
- Woman's Era (India)
- Woman's Own (UK)
- Woman's Weekly (UK)
- Woman's World (US)
- Women's Health UK (UK)
- Women's Health (US)
- Women's Running (US)
- Zan-e Rooz (Iran)

== Defunct women's magazines ==
- Ainslee's Magazine (1897–1926, US)
- Al-Fatat (1892–1894, Egypt)
- All You (2004–2015, US)
- The American Home (1928–1977, US)
- The American Jewess (1895–1899, US)
- The Indian Ladies' Magazine (1901–1938, India)
- Arthur's Lady's Home Magazine (1852–c. 1898, US)
- Arthur's Magazine (1844–1846, US), merged with Godey's Lady's Book
- Asjraq (1925–1930s, Dutch East Indies)
- Audrey (2003–2015, US)
- Australian Woman's Mirror (1924–1961, Australia)
- Der Bazar (1855–1933, Germany)
- La Belle Assemblée (1806–1868, UK)
- Bint Al Nil (1945–1957, Egypt)
- Bitch (1996–2022, US)
- Blueprint: Design Your Life (2006–2008, US)
- Chrysalis (1977–1980, US)
- Cleo (1972–2016, Australia)
- Conditions (1976–1990, US)
- Cookie (2005–2009, US)
- Costume (2012–2014, Finland)
- The Delineator (1873–1937, US)
- Demet (1908), Turkey
- Destiny (2007–2019, South Africa)
- Domino (2005–2009, US)
- Emancipation Pictorial (1920–1921, China)
- The Englishwoman's Domestic Magazine (1852–1879, England)
- Elle Girl (2001–2006, US)
- Family Circle (1932–2019, US)
- Family Health (1969–1991, US)
- The Farmer's Wife (1897–1939, US)
- Fatat al-Sharq (1906–1929, Egypt)
- The Female Spectator (1744–1746, UK)
- Femina (1972–2023, Indonesia)
- Femina (1982–2010, South Africa)
- Femmes françaises (1944–1957, France)
- Filament (UK)
- Fit Pregnancy (1993–2015, US)
- Fitness (1992–2015, US)
- Flare (1979–2016, Canada)
- Focus: A Journal for Lesbians (1970–1983, US)
- Funü zazhi (1915–1931, China)
- g3 (British magazine) (2001–2013, UK)
- Girl Germs (1990, US)
- Girlfriends (1993–2006, US)
- Glamour (1939–2019, US)
- Godey's Lady's Book (1830–1878, US)
- The Green Book Magazine (1909–1921, US)
- Hanımlara Mahsus Gazete (1895–1908, Ottoman Empire)
- Harpies and Quines (1992–1994, UK)
- Hearth and Home (1868–1875, US)
- Hennes (1961–2009, Sweden)
- Heresies: A Feminist Publication on Art and Politics (1977–1992, US)
- Holland's Magazine (1876–1953, US)
- The Home (1920–1942, Australia)
- Home Chat, (1895–1959, UK)
- Home Notes, (1894–1958, UK)
- Homemakers (1966–2011, Canada)
- Home Monthly (1896–1900, US)
- Honey (1960–1986, UK)
- I Confess (1922–1932, US)
- Indianapolis Woman Magazine (1994–2012, US)
- Isteri Soesila–Taman Moeslimah (1924–1926, Dutch East Indies)
- Jane (1997–2007, US)
- Janus (1975–1980, US)
- Kadınca (1978–1998, Turkey)
- Kim (1992–1999, Turkey)
- The Ladder (1956–1972, US)
- Ladies' Home Journal (1883–2016, US)
- Ladies' Magazine (1827–1837, US), merged with Godey's Lady's Book
- The Ladies' Mercury (1693, England)
- The Lady (1885–2025, UK)
- The Lady's Magazine (1770–1847, England)
- The Lady's Monthly Museum (1798–1832, England)
- The Lady's Realm (1896–1915, England)
- Latina (1996–2018, US)
- Lear's (1988–1994, US)
- Look (2007–2018, UK)
- Lucky (2000–2015, US)
- Mademoiselle (1935–2001)
- Máxima (1988–2020, Portugal)
- McCall's (1897–2002, US)
- Mingguan Wanita (1983–2020, Malaysia)
- Mirabella (1989–2000, US)
- Missbehave (2006–2009, US)
- MODE (1997–2001, US)
- Modern Woman (1930s – 1950s UK)
- More (1997–2016, US)
- Mothering (1976–2011, US)
- Muslim Girl (2007, Canada/US)
- Nameh-e Banuvan (1920–1921, Iran)
- New England Offering (1847–1850, US)
- New York Woman (1986–1992, US)
- Nova (1965–1975, UK)
- NOW (1996–2019, UK)
- O: The Oprah Magazine (2000–2020, US)
- off our backs (1970–2008, US)
- On the Issues (1983–2008, US)
- On Our Backs (1984–2006, US)
- Parenting (1987–2013, US)
- Parents (1926–2022, US)
- Peterson's Magazine (1842–1898, US)
- Pictorial Review (1899–1939, US)
- Playgirl (1973–2016, US)
- Poetri Hindia (1908–1912, Dutch East Indies)
- Quilter's Newsletter (1969–2016, US)
- ROCKRGRL (1994–2005, US)
- Redbook (1903–2019, US)
- Reveal (2004–2018, UK)
- Rosie (2001–2003, US)
- Smith's Magazine (1905–1922, US)
- Spare Rib (1972–1993, UK)
- Sports Illustrated for Women (1999–2002, US)
- Sportswoman (1973–1977, US)
- $pread (2005–2010, US)
- Stribodh (1857–1952, India)
- Stri Dharma (1918–1936, India)
- Sudden Weekly (1995–2015, Hong Kong)
- Tea Moderna (2001–2017, Macedonia)
- Terakki-i Muhadderat (1869–1870, Ottoman Empire)
- Today's Housewife (1905–1928, US)
- Ummi (1989–2018, Indonesia)
- U.S. Lady (1955, US)
- Velvetpark (2002–2007, US)
- Venus Zine (1995–2010)
- VIBE Vixen (2004–2013, US)
- Vice Versa (1947–1948, US)
- Viva (circa 1970s, US)
- The Woman Voter (1910–1917, US)
- Woman's Home Companion (1873–1957, US)
- Woman's Journal (1870–1931, US)
- Woman's Realm, merged with Woman's Weekly in 2001
- Woman's Viewpoint (1923–1927, US)
- Women in Music (1935–1940, US)
- Women's Physique World (1984–2006, US)
- Women's World (1913–1921, Turkey)
- womenSports (1974–2000, US)
- Working Woman (1976–2001, US)
- Young Woman's Journal (1889–1929, US)

== See also ==
- History of women's magazines
- List of teen magazines, the readership of many of which are primarily young women
- List of German women's magazines
- List of men's magazines
