= Dena Vane-Kirkman =

British magazine editor

- Born: Dena Lesley Vane; 1 May 1944; Barnsley
- Died: 19 October 2018 (aged 74)
- Education: Barton Peveril Grammar School
- Occupation: Magazine editor
- Known for: Editor of Woman's World
- Children: 2

Dena Lesley Vane-Kirkman (1 May 1944 – 19 October 2018) was an innovative British magazine editor who is best known for her work on Woman's World in New York in the 1980s when she was part of a group of British women who made careers editing American women's magazines.

== Early life and family ==
Dena Lesley Vane was born on 1 May 1944, to Ronald Vane, a soldier in the British Army, and his wife Phyllis, a cinema usherette. Her father died when she was two but her mother subsequently married his brother, Leslie, whom she had met at Ronald's funeral.

She was educated at Barton Peveril Grammar School where she was head girl.

== Career ==
Vane-Kirkman's career in the media began with a secretarial job on the Daily Express in London where she worked for the motoring correspondent Basil Cardew and the industrial editor Sir Trevor Evans. She became a reporter and then women's editor for the local Hendon Times where she met her husband Peter Kirkman whom she married in 1965 becoming Dena Vane-Kirkman. Professionally, she remained Dena Vane. The couple had two children.

She became a sub-editor on Woman and then deputy editor of Home and Freezer Digest which she revamped so that it outsold Good Housekeeping. She applied the same formula at Living magazine where she moved it away from housekeeping and cookery towards features on relationships, sex, and women's health. According to Ronnie Lessem, however, her attempts to include business coverage were thwarted by men who saw traditional women's subjects as more profitable.

After Living was sold, she moved to New York where she edited Woman's World in the 1980s, a magazine of Bauer Publishing, and then First for Women. Her marriage ended at that time. She introduced new titles such as In Touch and Life and Style and took the firm's portfolio from two to nine titles. As in the U.K., she changed the content to address more contemporary issues. She was one of a number of British women who made careers editing American women's magazines at that time and her contemporaries included Tina Brown at Vanity Fair and Eve Pollard at Elle. She eventually became editor-in-chief at Bauer under Jill Churchill. Her views on the future of women's magazines were included in the source book Taking Their Place: A Documentary of Women in Journalism.

In January 2006, she was robbed at gunpoint at her home in New Jersey but told the burglar, "Your mother would be ashamed of you".

== Death ==
Vane-Kirkman died of heart failure on 19 October 2018, after having multiple sclerosis and lymphedema. Her funeral was at Putney Vale Crematorium in England. Mourners were asked to "dress in clothes Dena would have loved".
