= Asena (disambiguation) =

Asena may refer to:

- Asena, a she-wolf associated with a Göktürk ethnogenic myth
- Asena (name), a Turkish feminine given name
- Asena Tuğal, Turkish television journalist
- Duygu Asena, Turkish journalist
- Asena (belly dancer), Turkish belly dancer
