= Alexandra Fröhlich =

German novelist (1966/1967–2025)

- Born: 1966 or 1967
- Died: 22 April 2025 (aged 58); Hamburg, Germany
- Cause of death: Blunt force trauma
- Occupation: Journalist; writer
- Notable work: Meine russische Schwiegermutter und andere Katastrophen; Reisen mit Russen; Gestorben wird immer; Dreck am Stecken
- Children: 3

Alexandra Fröhlich (1966 or 1967 – 22 April 2025) was a German journalist and writer.

== Life and career ==
Fröhlich was initially active as a journalist in Ukraine and founded a women's magazine in Kyiv. In Germany she later worked as a freelance author for various women's magazines, including Petra and Freundin.

In 2012 she published her debut novel, Meine russische Schwiegermutter und andere Katastrophen ("My Russian Mother-in-law and Other Catastrophes"), with Knaur, about the stubborn mother-in-law Darja, her son Artjom, and lawyer Paula, who falls in love with Artjom. The novel sold more than 50,000 copies and reached Der Spiegel's bestseller list. It was also released in French in 2015 under the title Ma belle-mère russe et autres catastrophes. In the 2014 sequel, Reisen mit Russen, the Hamburg lawyer Paula travels to Kyiv to reconcile with her Russian husband, Artjom, only to find that he has disappeared, prompting her to search for him with her mother-in-law. Both works are semi-autobiographical, drawing on Fröhlich's failed marriage to a Russian.

These were followed by the crime novel Gestorben wird immer (2016) about 91-year-old Agnes Weisgut, who wants to come clean as the head of the stonemasonry business Weisgut & Söhne in Hamburg, and Dreck am Stecken (2019) about the diary of the deceased grandfather Heinrich, which reveals numerous secrets.

Fröhlich had three sons. She last lived on a houseboat at Holzhafenufer in the Moorfleet quarter of Hamburg, where she was found dead by blunt force trauma on 22 April 2025. She was 58, Investigators suspected foul play, and an investigation has commenced. The suspect was then arrested by the police and taken into custody for the murder of Fröhlich.

== Works ==
- Meine russische Schwiegermutter und andere Katastrophen. Knaur, Munich 2012, ISBN 3-426-51256-4.
- Reisen mit Russen. Knaur, Munich 2014, ISBN 978-3-426-51468-9.
- Gestorben wird immer. Penguin, Munich 2016, ISBN 978-3-328-10001-0.
- Dreck am Stecken. Penguin, Munich 2019, ISBN 978-3-328-10231-1.
