= Filiz Koçali =

Turkish politician

Filiz Koçali (born 22 January 1958, Istanbul) is a female Turkish politician and a feminist activist and journalist. She was a founder member of the Freedom and Solidarity Party (ÖDP) in 1996 and of the break-away Socialist Democracy Party (SDP) in 2002, and was secretary general of the SDP from 2004 to 2009. She is now a member of the Peace and Democracy Party.

== Career ==
Born in Istanbul, she participated in the students' movement in 1976. She interrupted her vocational training to work in several factories and take part in the struggles of the labor movement. After the 1980 military coup, she was active in a human rights organisation in Istanbul.

As a journalist she wrote for the magazines Kadınca and Kim and the newspapers Radikal gazetesi and Bianet. Having been a part of the women's rights movement since 1987, Koçali was one of the founding members of the feminist magazine Pazartesi, whose editor-in-chief she was for a while. She was editor of the daily Günlük (published 2009 to 2011).

She was involved in the founding of the Freedom and Solidarity Party (ÖDP) in 1996 as well as the Socialist Democracy Party, which broke away from the former in 2002, and a member of the executive committees of both parties. She was secretary general of the Socialist Democracy Party (SDP) from May 2004 to 2009.
