= Maxi =

Maxi may refer to:

== People ==
=== Given name ===
- Maxi Biancucchi (born 1984), Argentine footballer who plays for Flamengo
- Maxi López (born 1984), Argentine footballer who plays in Europe
- Maxi Pereira (born 1984), Uruguayan footballer who plays for SL Benfica
- Maxi Rodríguez (born 1981), Argentine footballer who plays for Newell's Old Boys
- Maximiliano Vallejo (born 1982), Argentine footballer who plays for Shahrdari Bandar Abbas FC
- Maxi Kleber (born 1992), German basketball player

=== Stage name or nickname ===
- Maxi (singer) (born 1950), Irish radio disc-jockey and producer; actor, journalist, and singer
- Maxi Glamour, American drag artist
- Maxi Jazz (1957–2022), English musician, rapper, singer-songwriter and DJ; lead vocalist of Faithless
- Maxi Priest (born 1961), British reggae vocalist of Jamaican descent
- Maxi, a contestant on the series Blush: The Search for the Next Great Makeup Artist
- Glenn Maxwell (born 1988), Australian cricketer known as "Maxi"
- Maksym Talovierov (born 2000), Ukrainian footballer known as "Maxi"

=== Fictional characters ===
- Maxi (Soulcalibur), a Ryukyuan pirate from the Soul series of fighting games
- Father Maxi, a priest from the comedy series South Park
- Maxi, from the TV series Roary the Racing Car
- Maxi Ponte, from the Disney Channel telenovela Violetta
- Maxi Purvis, from the ITV drama series Bad Girls
- Maximilian Papandrious, occasionally nicknamed "Maxi", from the ITV sitcom Mind Your Language

== Retail stores ==
- Maxi (Canadian supermarket) and Maxi & Co., a groceries store in Quebec, Canada
- Maxi (Serbian supermarket), a Serbian supermarket chain
- ICA Maxi, and MAXI ICA Stormarknad, stores operated by Swedish retailer ICA AB

== Other uses ==
- Maxi (album), by Maxi Priest
- Maxi (magazine), a German women's magazine
- MAXI, an X-ray monitoring device aboard the International Space Station
- Austin Maxi, a 1970s medium-sized 5-door hatchback car produced by British Leyland
- Maxi dress, an ankle-length dress
- Maxi language, a Gbe language in Benin, part of the Fon dialect cluster
- Maxi pad, a type of absorbent sanitary towel worn by women
- Maxi single, a music single release with more than the usual two tracks
- Maxi skirt, an ankle-length skirt
- Maxi yacht, a large racing sailboat

== See also ==
- Maximum and minimum
