= Journal für die Frau =

Biweekly women's magazine based in Hamburg, Germany (1978–2005)

- Editor-in-chief: Stefan Lewerenz
- Categories: Women's magazine
- Frequency: Biweekly
- Founded: 1978
- First issue: 30 August 1978
- Final issue: January 2005
- Company: Axel Springer Verlag (1978–2005); Burda Verlag (2005)
- Country: Germany
- Based in: Hamburg
- Language: German

Journal für die Frau was a biweekly women's magazine that existed between 1978 and 2005. It was headquartered in Hamburg, Germany.

== History and profile ==
The magazine was established in 1978 with the name Journal für Haushalt und Familie. The first issue of the magazine appeared on 30 August 1978 and was published on a monthly basis.

In October 1980 it was renamed Journal für die Frau. The frequency of the magazine was switched to biweekly on 19 October 1983. Its headquarters was in Hamburg. The market share of Journal für die Frau was 15,5% in 2000 in terms of subscription. In 2001 the website of the magazine was launched. Target audience of Journal für die Frau was women aged 40-49. Stefan Lewerenz was one of the editors-in-chief of the magazine. In the second quarter of 2003 Journal für die Frau sold 306,312 copies.

The owner of the magazine was Axel Springer Verlag until first quarter of 2005 when Burda Verlag, a media company based in Munich, acquired it. The last issue of Journal für die Frau was published in January 2005. The new owner of the magazine, Burda, merged it with another women's magazine Freundin.
