= Carol Kipling =

American interior designer

Carol Kipling is an American interior designer based in Los Angeles and Seattle.

== Career ==
Kipling established her reputation while designing interiors and furnishings in Hollywood and across the U.S. She opened her Los Angeles interior design practice and retail store in 1997 on Melrose Avenue and quickly became recognized for her unique handmade furniture and accessories.

Regarded as more cutting-edge than trendy Kipling designs furnishings for both private clients and fellow professional interior designers. Architectural Digest praised her handmade works for “illustrating her simple, comfortable and colorful aesthetic” while In Touch Weekly similarly admired Kipling's color palette and custom accessories belonging to Jennifer Aniston, Brad Pitt, Benicio del Toro and Kim Cattrall.

In interviews for both The Hollywood Reporter and the Los Angeles Times, Kipling advocated using a mix of organic materials,[10] individualized color selections and a balance of modern and vintage furnishings as the keys to creating a successful environment.

Spotlighting internationally recognized architects, designers and photographers, Carol Kipling authored Hollywood Bachelor Pads, published and released worldwide by Schiffer Publishing in 2009. Her book showcases the homes and interiors of successful single men and celebrities, like Kanye West and Dave Navarro living in Southern California.

== Publications ==
Kipling, C. Hollywood Bachelor Pads (c2009). PN; Schiffer Publishing ISBN 9780764333071
