= Burmester =

Burmester can refer to:

== People ==
- Hans-Jürgen Burmester (1916–1998), Major in the Wehrmacht during World War II
- Henry Burmester Pulleine (1838–1879), administrator and commander in the British Army
- Leo Burmester (1944–2007), American actor
- Ludwig Burmester (1840–1927), German mathematician
  - Burmester's theory, named after Ludwig Burmester
- Mark Burmester (born 1968), former Zimbabwe cricketer
- Moss Burmester (born 1981), New Zealand 200m butterfly swimmer
- O. H. E. Burmester (1897–1977), British specialist in Arabic coptology
- Rudolf Burmester (1875–1956), British navy officer
- Silke Burmester (born 1966), German journalist and author
- Torsten Burmester (born 1963), German politician
- Willy Burmester (1869–1933), German violinist

== Places ==
- Burmester, Utah, unincorporated community in Tooele County, Utah, United States
- Burmester Dome, an ice-capped dome in the west-central Saratoga Table, Antarctica

== Company ==
- Burmester Audiosysteme, a German manufacturer of audio components founded by Dieter Burmester (1946–2015)

== See also ==
- Burmeister, a surname
