= Silke Burmester =

German journalist and writer (born 1966)

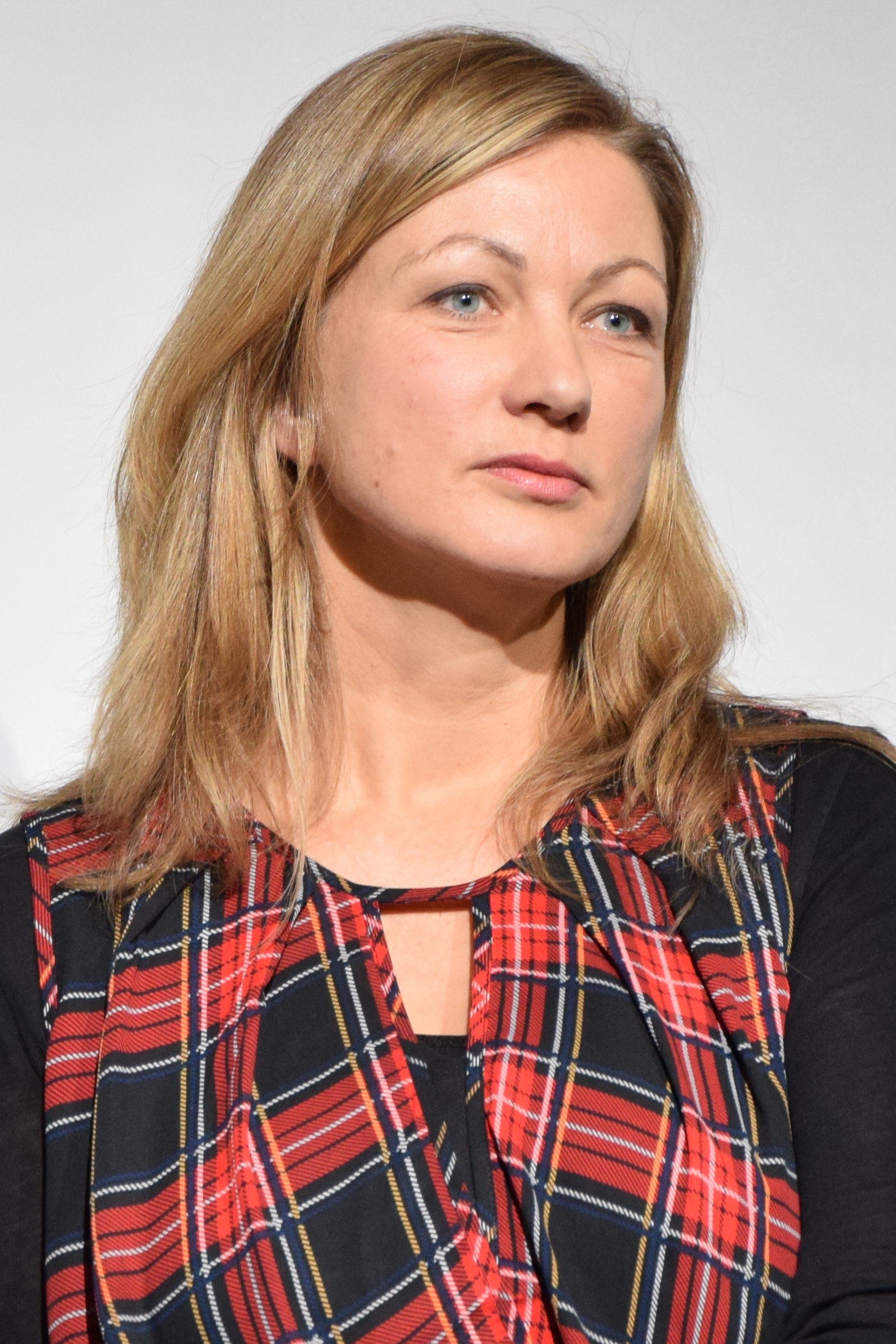
Burmester in 2015

Silke Burmester (born 1966 in Hamburg) is a German journalist, columnist and author.

== Life and career ==
Silke Burmester worked as an editorial assistant and production manager at Spiegel TV Thema. Together with Heike Hackbarth, she founded the fanzine planet pussy in the 1990s. She was a writer for Petra and Die Woche. At Amica, she headed the "Sex und Sünde" (Sex and Sin) section, and at Jahreszeiten Verlag she worked as a freelance chief editor.

At Die Tageszeitung, Burmester wrote for seven years a weekly media column under the persona of a "war reporter" until July 2016. For Spiegel Online she wrote the column S.P.O.N. – Helden der Gegenwart until March 2014. She has also written columns for Medium Magazin ("Burmester’s Moral Advice"), netzwerkrecherche.de, the Sächsische Zeitung, Die Zeit, Zeit-Magazin and mare.

In February 2008 taz published Burmester's multi-part satirical column The Secret Diary of Carla Bruni, which was published as a book later that year. The book was also discussed in the French and Italian press and translated into Romanian and Estonian. The audiobook version, read by Esther Schweins, was listed in February 2009 on the hr2-kultur best audiobooks chart.

In 2012 her book Beruhigt Euch! (Calm down!) was published, described as a "pamphlet against media hysteria". In 2016 she published Mutterblues – Mein Kind wird erwachsen, und was werde ich?, about the challenges faced by mothers when children grow up.

Burmester teaches creative writing at the Academy for Journalism in Hamburg, for SWR and at the Henri Nannen School. She advocates for freelance journalism and is a member of ProQuote, Freischreiber, the dju, the PEN Centre Germany and is a founding member of PEN Berlin.

In October 2020 she launched the online magazine Palais F*luxx, aimed at women aged 47 and above.

== Awards ==
In 2010, Burmester was awarded third place by Medium Magazin in the Journalist of the Year award in the "Culture" category, and in 2011 and 2012 she won second place in the "Entertainment" category for her humorous and biting texts.

In 2017, she received the Bert-Donnepp-Preis for media journalism.

In 2023 she and Gesine Cukrowski received the Honorary Prize Inspiration of the German Actors' Award for their campaign Let's Change The Picture.

== Jury member ==
In 2011 Burmester was on the jury of the Grimme-Preis in the "Entertainment" category, in 2012 in the "Fiction" category, and she was also a jury member for the German Radio Prize in 2011. In 2014 she was on the jury of the Prix Pantheon.

== Publications ==
- Das geheime Tagebuch der Carla Bruni. Kiepenheuer & Witsch, Cologne 2008, ISBN 978-3-462-04066-1.
- Beruhigt Euch! Kiepenheuer & Witsch, Cologne 2012, ISBN 978-3-462-04434-8; ISBN 978-3-462-30571-5 (e-book).
- Mutterblues. Kiepenheuer & Witsch, Cologne 2016, ISBN 978-3-462-04952-7.
