= Tasneem Bhatia =

Physician and personality

Taz Bhatia
- Born: Tasneem Bhatia
- Occupations: Medical doctor, author
- Works: What Doctors Eat; The 21-Day Belly Fix; Super Woman RX; The Hormone Shift (2023); The Hormone Shift (2024)
- Website: doctortaz.com

Tasneem Bhatia, known professionally as Dr. Taz, is a physician practicing in integrative and holistic medicine, author, podcaster, and entrepreneur. She is the founder of hol+, an integrative medicine practice, formerly known as CentreSpringMD.

== Career ==
Bhatia completed a Fellowship in Integrative Medicine at the University of Arizona under Dr. Andrew Weil, leading to the creation of her own practice. She is board-certified in integrative medicine and is a certified nutrition specialist. In 2009, Bhatia founded CentreSpringMD, an integrative medical practice based in Atlanta, Georgia.

In 2018, Bhatia hosted a panel at Gwyneth Paltrow's Goop health summit in New York City. The panel was titled Diet+Body, and she spoke on the topics of Chinese medicine and gut health.

In 2023, Bhatia released her book, The Hormone Shift, which focuses on midlife and menopause. In that same year, she presented at the goop Hormonal Immersive in Los Angeles, California.

In 2025, Bhatia launched the brand hol+, a rebrand of CentreSpringMD. Also in that year, she was recognized in the EY Entrepreneurial Winning Women North America Class of 2025.

=== Board roles ===
Bhatia is a member of UNICEF's Atlanta-based advisory board. Additionally, Bhatia is a member of the medical advisory board for Genexa, a pharmaceutical company specializing in over-the-counter medications using natural ingredients.

=== Media ===
Bhatia has appeared as a contributor on The Dr. Oz Show, TODAY, and CNN, and has written columns for Woman's World magazine.

Bhatia is the subject of a PBS special titled Super Woman RX with Dr. Taz.

Bhatia hosts the hol+ podcast, which was launched in 2025. The podcast covers topics related to hormonal health, weight management, and integrative medicine.

== Bibliography ==
- What Doctors Eat: Tips, Recipes, and the Ultimate Eating Plan for Lasting Weight Loss and Perfect Health (2013) ISBN 9781609619565
- The 21-Day Belly Fix: The Doctor-Designed Diet Plan for a Clean Gut and Slimmer Waist (2014) ISBN 9780553393637
- Super Woman RX: Unlock the Secrets to Lasting Health, Your Perfect Weight, Energy, and Passion with Dr. Taz's Power Type Plans (2017) ISBN 9781623368586
- The Hormone Shift: Balance Your Body and Thrive Through Midlife and Menopause (2023) ISBN 9780593578711
- The Hormone Shift: A Decade-by-Decade Guide (2024) ISBN 9789354899416

== Personal life ==
Taz Bhatia is married to Vik Bhatia. The couple have two children.
