= Bahana =

Bahana (transl. Excuse) may refer to these Indian Hindi-language films:

- Bahana (1942 film)
- Bahana (1960 film)

== See also ==
- Bahan (disambiguation)
- Bahana (magazine)
