= Asena (name) =

- Gender: Female
- Language: Turkish

Origin
- Language: Turkic
- Meaning: "Asena"

Asena is a feminine Turkish given name of mythological origin. In Turkic mythology, Asena is the name of a legendary she-wolf associated with the origin story of the Göktürks.

== People ==
=== Given name ===
- Asena Tuğal (born 1984), Turkish actress
- Asena Yalçın (born 1991), Turkish basketball player

=== Surname ===
- Duygu Asena (1946–2006), Turkish journalist
- İnci Asena (born 1948), Turkish publisher
