= Für Sie =

German fortnightly women's magazine

Für Sie (German: For Her) is a German-language fortnightly women's magazine published in Hamburg, Germany.

== History and profile ==
Für Sie was founded in 1948 and was relaunched in 2009. The magazine was published every fortnight in Hamburg by Jahreszeiten Verlag, a division of Ganske-Verlagsgruppe. Sabine Faeth was the editor-in-chief since 2011. In September 2018 the magazine was sold to the Klambt media group.

In 2004 Für Sie sold 480,372 copies.
