= Merian (magazine) =

German travel magazine

Merian is a German travel magazine which was founded in 1948. It is named after Matthäus Merian. The magazine is published by Jahreszeiten Verlag in Hamburg. Each issue of this monthly print publication is devoted to a specific city or region. The issues each deal with a geographical region: a country, a part of a country, a group of countries or a city. The name of the journal recalls the Basel engraver Matthäus Merian, who published illustrated descriptions of cities in the 17th century.
