= Bahan =

Bahan may refer to:

== Places ==
- Bahan, Burma
- Bahan, Iran
- Bahan, Israel

== People ==
- Ben Bahan, American professor
- Leonard Bahan (1898–1977), American football player
- Walter W. Bahan (1860–1916), American lawyer and politician

== See also ==
- Bahana (disambiguation)
