= Socialist Democracy Party =

Socialist Democracy Party Sosyalist Demokrasi Partisi
- Leader: Rıdvan Turan
- Founded: 28 August 2002
- Dissolved: 1 September 2015
- Merged into: United Revolutionary Party
- Headquarters: Ankara
- Ideology: Democratic socialism
- Political position: Left-wing
- National affiliation: Peoples' Democratic Congress
- Colours: Red

Website
- sosyalistdemokrasipartisi.org (Archived)

Socialist Democracy Party (Sosyalist Demokrasi Partisi, SDP) was a socialist party in Turkey. Most of its members were formerly in an opposition grouping within ÖDP, named Sosyalist Eylem Platformu (Socialist Action Platform). They defended closer ties with pro-Kurdish DEHAP and radical left and campaigned against privatisation and European Union membership. Their views were seen "too conservative" by most ÖDP affiliates and they left the party in 2001.

The SDP was founded on the 28 August 2002. It did not contest elections of 2002 and 2004, but supported left-wing electoral alliances. In the summer of 2005, it announced a Sosyalist Forum for negotiations of a broader unification, which proved to be futile. At 2007 elections, it declared support for the independent candidates of Democratic Society Party. Akın Birdal, who was elected to the Parliament in 2007, is the honorary chairman of SDP.

Following a major internal dispute, a number of founding members, including Mihri Belli, a prestigious name of the Turkish left, resigned in 2008. In 2009, Filiz Koçali, serving as the only female party chairperson of Turkey since 2004, resigned.

The party was one of the participants of the People's Democratic Congress, a political initiative instrumental in founding the Peoples' Democratic Party in 2012.

The Party dissolved itself in 2015 and joined the United Revolutionary Party.
