= Cittá Bella =

- Front cover of issue 423, featuring Alyssa Chia
- Native name: Bella儂儂
- Categories: Woman's magazine, Fasion magazine
- Frequency: Monthly
- Founder: Tsai Kun-lin
- Founded: 1984
- Company: Nong-Nong group limited (Chinese: 儂儂國際媒體集團出版), Cite Publishing Limited
- Country: Taiwan, Singapore, Malaysia
- Based in: Taipei, Taiwan
- Language: Chinese
- ISSN: 1015-9983

Cittá Bella (Chinese: Bella儂儂), also known as Bella Nong-Nong, is a Taiwanese woman's magazine, covering various topics of fasion, food, lifestyle, gender, and travel. It was published monthly from its first published in Taiwan by 1984. The magazine was founded by Tsai Kun-lin of Cathay Group. A Singaporean and Malaysian edition, Cittá Bella, is published in Singapore and Malaysia, was first published in April 1997. Since 2000, Cittá Bella has been owned by Cite Publishing Limited, a publisher owned by TOM Group. Currently, Nong-Nong group limited (Chinese: 儂儂國際媒體集團出版) under Cite Publishing Limited publishes the magazine.

== Style ==
Target audience of Bella is designed to working woman. Bella covers topics including fashion, food, lifestyle, and travel. Some designated the magazine into trending and lifestyle. While discussing usual topics such as family and relationship, Bella also discuss topics that was not consider mainstream in Taiwan at the 1990s, such as single life, sex, and cohabitation. The magazine also includes a lot of advertisement images, particularly costume, cosmetics, and hairstyle. It also use full-colour printing from its first publish in 1980s, in contrast to most magazines using monochrome printing at the time. Following Bella, Taiwanese woman's magazine changed to full-colour printing and published in double volumes.

== History ==
Bella is founded by Tsai Kun-lin of Cathay Group, a Taiwanese publisher who was suffered from post-war Taiwan's authoritarian regime. To decide the new magazine's style before its foundation, Cathay Group had researched for one year to research local magazine market and a Japanese woman's magazine called Know-How.

In 1989, Bella introduced Cosmopolitan with the name "metropolis" (Chinese: 大都會), but later was taken by Cosmopolitan. In 1993, Cittá Bella released overseas edition in Singapore and Malaysia. In 1996, Nong-Nong established Reian-A Century (Chinese: 聯亞世紀) with SPH Media in Singapore, Burda in Germany, and Rizzoli in Italy. The company published "Living生活便利". In April 1997, Cittá Bella established Malaysian edition in Malaysia, known as "Citta Bella都会佳人".

Bella is the most-read women's magazine in Taiwan. In 2000, the Business Weekly Group (Chinese: 商周集團) invested the Nong-Nong group, and the magazine belonged to Cite Publishing Limited under the Business Weekly Group. In 2001, Marie Claire terminated their partnership with China Times Group and cooperated with the Nong-Nong Group instead.

In September, Bella published issue 400. To celebrate the anniversary, the group hired Johnason Lo to redesign a new logo.

== External link ==
- Official website
- 《Citta Bella都会佳人》
