= Gynaika Magazine =

May 2010 cover of Gynaika

Gynaika Magazine (Greek ΓΥΝΑΙΚΑ), first published on 1 February 1952 by Evangelos Terzopoulos Publishing Enterprises S.A., was the first Greek women's magazine. The word 'Gynaika' means woman in Greek. Before its publication, all Greek magazines were targeted towards the male gender.

When the Greek media was opened up to international competition in the late 1980s many international women's magazines, such as ELLE and Marie Claire, entered the Greek market severely reducing the magazine's circulation.
