= Indianapolis Woman Magazine =

- Type: Women's magazine
- Format: Paper magazine
- Owner: Mary B. Weiss
- Publisher: Weiss Communications, Inc.
- Editor: Shari Finnell
- Founded: September 1984
- Ceased publication: 2012
- Language: English
- Headquarters: Indianapolis, Indiana
- Circulation: 61,457

Indianapolis Woman was a monthly magazine published in Indianapolis, USA, that covered issues of interest to women.

== History and profile ==
Indianapolis Woman Magazine was started as a monthly by C. E. Publishing in September 1984. The founding publishers were Connie Rosenthal and Linda Eder. It carried articles on shopping, cooking and decorating targeting women in Indianapolis.

The magazine was acquired by the Weiss Communications Inc. in 1994. It was a free publication with Shari Finnell as the editor-in-chief, and was published monthly by the company until April 2012.
