= Avantages =

French women's magazine

- Editor-in-chief: Isabelle Bourgeois
- Categories: Women's magazine
- Frequency: Monthly
- Circulation: Fashion
- Publisher: Avantages SA
- Founded: 1988; 38 years ago
- Company: Marie Claire Group
- Country: France
- Based in: Paris
- Language: French
- Website: Avantages
- ISSN: 0992-9967

Avantages is a monthly French women's fashion magazine published in Paris, France. It is one of the most read women's magazines in the country and is the French edition of the British magazine Essentials.

== History and profile ==
Avantages was established in 1988. The owner of the magazine is Marie Claire Group and its publisher is Avantages SA. The magazine has its headquarters in Paris and is published on a monthly basis. Its target audience includes working-class women.

As of 2015 Isabelle Bourgeois was the editor-in-chief of Avantages. She was appointed to the post in March 2007.

The website of Avantages was launched in 2009 and provides the readers with an opportunity to do shopping online, being the first in this regard in France.

== Circulation ==
The circulation of Avantages was 512,000 copies in 2005. The magazine sold 465,000 copies in the period of 2007–2008. It had a circulation of 438,565 copies in 2010. Its circulation was 457,028 copies in 2013. In November 2014 the number of its readers was 1,829,000. The magazine had a circulation of 430,299 copies in 2014.
