= Gerd Hatje =

German publisher

- Born: 14 April 1915; Hamburg, German Empire
- Died: 24 July 2007 (aged 92); Stuttgart, Germany
- Occupation: Publisher
- Organization: Verlag Gerd Hatje
- Awards: Order of Merit of Baden-Württemberg

Gerd Hatje (14 April 1915 – 24 July 2007) was a German publisher. The publishing house that he founded in 1945, named the Humanitas Verlag, renamed in 1947 as Verlag Gerd Hatje, is internationally known for contemporary art, photography and architecture. It merged in to Hatje Cantz in 1999.

== Career ==
Hatje was born in Hamburg, the son of Eisenbahngewerkschafter Johann Hatje and his wife Lina. The family moved to Stuttgart when he was age 15. He apprenticed as a typesetter. In November 1945, Hatje received a licence to found a publishing house from the American and the French military government, which he called Humanitas Verlag. It first published literature, novellas, novels, world literature (Weltliteratur), and books on jazz. He renamed the house Verlag Gerd Hatje in 1947.

In the 1950s and 1960s, Hatje changed the focus to art, photography, and architecture. He had contact with and was a friend of contemporary artists such as Hans Arp, Willi Baumeister, Joseph Beuys, Max Bill, Georges Braque, Marcel Breuer, Marc Chagall, Christo, Le Corbusier, Max Ernst, Alberto Giacometti, Walter Gropius, Joan Miró, Pablo Picasso, Ludwig Mies van der Rohe, and James Stirling. He collaborated with international publishers such as Harry N. Abrams and Thames and Hudson. Hatje described publishing as "intellectual spaces are made accessible". The publishing house gained international recognition.

In 1990, he sold the publishing house to Dr. Cantz'sche Druckerei. The companies merged as Hatje Cantz in 1999. Hatje kept working on a daily basis as senior editor. He died in Stuttgart.

== Awards ==
Hatje was awarded the Order of Merit of Baden-Württemberg in 1996. He was made Honorary Senator of the Stuttgart Academy of Arts.
