= Rıdvan Turan =

Turkish politician

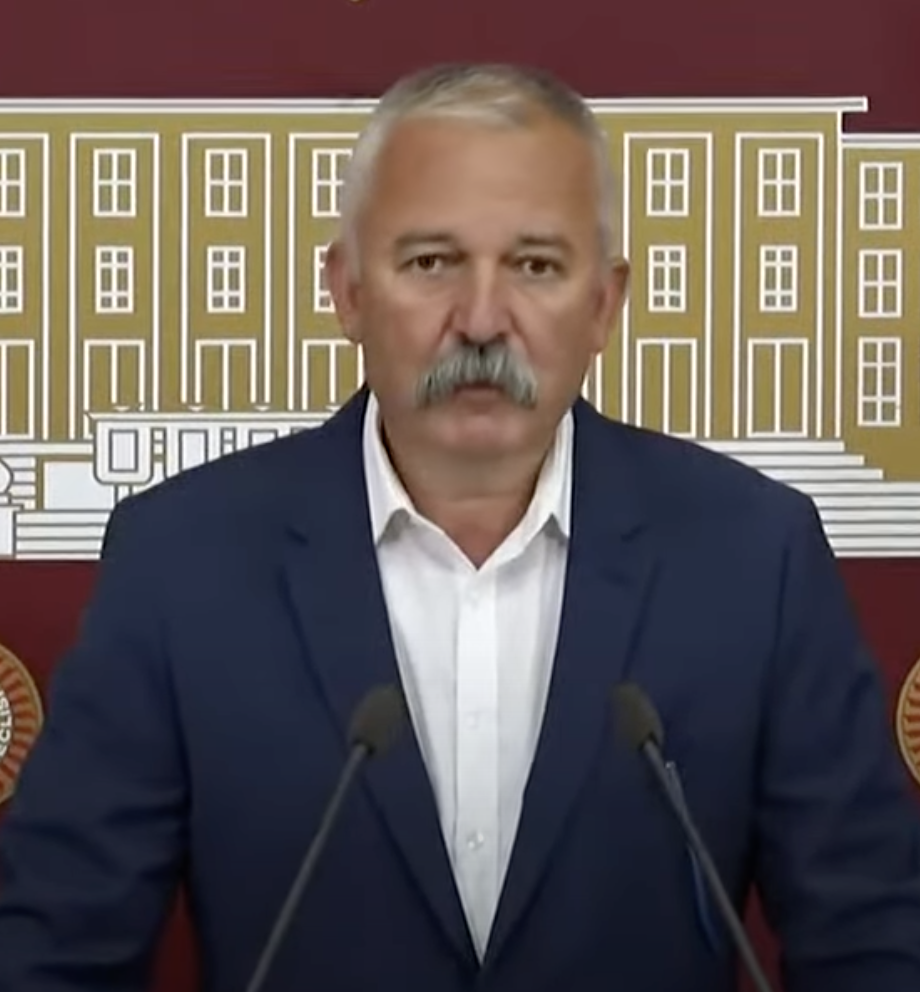

Member of the Grand National Assembly
- In office 8 July 2018 – 14 May 2023
- Constituency: Mersin (2018)
- In office 7 June 2015 – 1 November 2015
- Constituency: Adana (June 2015)

Personal details
- Born: March 29, 1971 (age 55) Reşadiye, Tokat, Turkey
- Party: Peoples' Democratic Party (HDP)
- Education: Uludağ University
- Occupation: Politician

Rıdvan Turan (born 1 January 1971) is a Turkish politician from the Peoples' Democratic Party (HDP), who serves as a Member of Parliament for Mersin.

Born in Reşadiye, Tokat, Turan graduated from Uludağ University Faculty of Medicine in 1995. In 2008, he was elected as the leader of the Socialist Democracy Party, which was a member of the Peoples' Democratic Congress and was thus instrumental in the establishment of the Peoples' Democratic Party (HDP) in 2012. In Jul 2013 he was convicted to 6 years and 3 months' imprisonment being a member of an illegal organization. The sentence was appealed. He was elected Member of Parliament for the HDP in the June 2015 general election but lost his seat in the snap election held on 1 November 2015.

He regained a seat in the 2018 parliamentary election representing Mersin.

== See also ==
- 25th Parliament of Turkey
