= Pleine Vie =

Monthly women's and general interest magazine in Paris, France

- Editor: Jeanne Thiriet
- Categories: Women's magazine; General interest magazine
- Frequency: Monthly
- Founder: Antoine Adam
- Founded: 1981; 44 years ago
- Company: Mondadori
- Country: France
- Based in: Paris
- Language: French
- Website: Pleine Vie
- ISSN: 0753-2164

Pleine Vie (French: Full Life) is a French language monthly general interest and women's magazine published in Paris, France, since 1981.

== History and profile ==
The magazine was established in 1981. The founder was Antoine Adam. It was renamed Pleine Vie in 1997. The magazine was part of Groupe Taitbout until July 1999 when it was acquired by the British media firm EMAP. The magazine had been published by Hachette Filipacchi until 2001 when it began to be published Quebecor World Inc.

The current owner of Pleine Vie is Mondadori France, a subsidiary of the Italian media group Mondadori.

Pleine Vie is published monthly. The magazine offers articles towards women over 50s and is edited by Jeanne Thiriet.

== Circulation ==
Pleine Vie sold 825,000 copies in 1998 and 823,000 copies in 1999. Its circulation rose to 1,021,000 copies in 2000 and to 1,083,980 copies in 2003.

In 2005 Pleine Vie sold 967,812 copies. In 2007 the circulation of the magazine was 913,000 copies. The magazine had a circulation of 854,000 copies in 2009 and 854,366 copies in 2010. Next year the magazine sold 843,647 copies. In 2012 the magazine had a circulation of 786,650 copies. In the period of 2013-2014 the circulation of the monthly was 786,515 copies, making it the second best-selling general interest magazine in France. Its circulation was 703,909 copies in 2014.
