= Burmeister =

Burmeister is a surname of German origin.

In zoology "Burmeister" refers to:

- Ernst-Gerhard Burmeister, German entomologist
- Hermann Burmeister (1807–1892), German zoologist also in botany "Burmeist."

Other people named Burmeister include:

- Annelies Burmeister (1928–1988), German contralto
- Arnold Burmeister (1899–1988), German military commander
- Carl Christian Burmeister (1821–1898), Danish engineer, co-founder of Burmeister & Wain
- Christfried Burmeister (1898–1965), Estonian speedskater
- Danny Burmeister (born 1963), American football player
- Eileen Burmeister (born 1924), American baseball player
- Forrest Burmeister (born 1913), American football player
- Friedrich Burmeister (1888–1968), German politician
- Friedrich Burmeister (geophysicist) (1890–1969), German geophysicist
- Jana Burmeister (born 1989), German football goalkeeper
- Joachim Burmeister (c 1566–1629), German poet and composer
- Judith Burmeister (born 1986), German singer
- Ken Burmeister (born 1947), American basketball coach
- Paul Burmeister (born 1971), American football commentator
- Richard Burmeister (1869–1944), German pianist and composer
- Roy Burmeister (1906–?), Canadian ice hockey player
- Saskia Burmeister (born 1985), Australian actress

== See also ==
- Burmester (disambiguation)
