= Tea Moderna =

- Tea Moderna's cover, January 2008
- Editor-in-chief: Mile Jovanovski
- Categories: Women's magazines
- Frequency: Weekly
- Publisher: Planet Press
- Founder: Mile Jovanovski
- Founded: 2001
- Company: Media Print Macedonia
- Country: Macedonia (now North Macedonia)
- Language: Macedonian
- Website: Tea Moderna

Tea Moderna (Macedonian: Теа Модерна) was a Macedonian woman's weekly magazine. Magazine ceased to be published in 2017.

== History and profile ==
Tea Moderna was founded by Mile Jovanovski in 2001. The magazine is part of Media Print Macedonia, which was formed by the WAZ group. It covers all topics related to women such as fashion, travel tips and social events.
