= Günlük =

Former newspaper in Turkey

- Type: Daily newspaper
- Founded: 19 January 2009
- Ceased publication: 4 April 2011
- Language: Turkish
- Headquarters: Istanbul, Turkey

Günlük (Daily) was a Turkish newspaper known for its writing about Kurdish issues. It was published from 2009 to 2011.

It was closed for a period of two months in 2009 under court order because of material deemed "terrorist propaganda" under Turkey's Press Law. One case related to an article by Amir Hassanpour, "Linguistic Rights in the Linguistic Systems of the Developed World: State, Market and Communication Technologies", which included a passing mention of the PKK. The monthly periodical Vesta had published the same article in 2003 without sanction. The newspaper and its journalists were often engaged in legal disputes with the Turkish authorities. The journalists faced terror related charges for an interview with Murat Karayilan, at the time the chairman of the Kurdistan Union of Communities (KCK), but in November 2010 where found not quilty. The paper's executive editors were Ayhan Bilgen and Filiz Koçali were both prosecuted; charges against the former were dropped, while the latter was acquitted. In 2013 the ECHR awarded damages for the suspensions, judging a violation of Article 10 of the European Convention on Human Rights.
