= Essentials (magazine) =

Defunct British lifestyle magazine

- Editor: Sarah Gooding
- Categories: Fashion, lifestyle.
- Frequency: Monthly
- Circulation: 106,648 (ABC Jul - Dec 2013); Print and digital editions.
- First issue: April 1988
- Final issue: December 2016
- Company: IPC Media
- Country: United Kingdom
- Based in: London
- Language: English
- Website: www.essentialsmagazine.com
- ISSN: 0953-6337

Essentials was a British lifestyle magazine published by IPC Media, part of Time Inc. It is still published in South Africa.

== History and profile ==
Essentials was launched in April 1988 in London, England with its final issue cover dated December 2016. It has several international editions. The French edition of the magazine is published under the name of Avantages.

The circulation of Essentials was 106,648 copies between July and December 2013.
