= Filament (magazine) =

Defunct British erotic quarterly magazine

- June 2010 cover
- Editor: Suraya Sidhu Singh
- Categories: Women's magazines
- Frequency: Quarterly / biannually
- First issue: June 2009
- Final issue: December 2011
- Country: United Kingdom
- Language: English
- Website: Filament
- ISSN: 2041-1472

Filament was a British erotic magazine aimed at women, published in the United Kingdom. It ran for 9 issues, from June 2009 to December 2011.

The magazine featured both explicit and non-explicit pornographic imagery of men, designed specifically for heterosexual women (as distinct from that designed for gay men). The magazine claimed to use "academic and primary research" in producing its content.

Critical reactions to Filament were varied. Voxpops with women undertaken by New Zealand current affairs programme Close Up were mixed, and those undertaken by British chat show The Wright Stuff were mainly negative, though some blogs were positive in their reception of the magazine.

== Erection campaign ==
In August 2009 Filament magazine began a campaign to become the first UK women's magazine to publish an erection pictorial, after the printers of its first issue declined to print the second if it contained such images. Filament sought to sell 328 further copies of the first issue to finance changing printer, and succeeded. The campaign attracted support from high-profile figures such as Zoe Margolis and Warren Ellis.
