= First for Women =

US magazine

- Categories: Women's magazine
- Frequency: Weekly
- Publisher: McClatchey Media
- Total circulation: 1,310,696 (2011)
- First issue: 1989
- Final issue: June 30, 2025
- Country: United States
- Language: English
- Website: Official website
- ISSN: 1040-9467

First for Women was an American women's magazine published from 1989 to 2025. It was launched by Bauer Media Group and later acquired by a360media. Following the merger of a360media and McClatchy in 2024, the magazine became part of the McClatchy Media Company. Its final issue was dated June 30, 2025. The magazine was started in 1989 by Bauer Media Group. In 2011 the circulation of the magazine was 1,310,696 copies. In April 2024, the magazine went weekly. The magazine ceased publication in June 2025, after 35 years.

== History ==
Bauer Media Group launched First for Women in 1989 as its second publication in the United States, following the launch of Woman's World in 1981. In 2011, the magazine had a circulation of 1,310,696 copies.

In 2022, Bauer Media Group sold the print and digital assets of ''First for Women'', ''Woman's World'' and its American bookazine business to a360media.

In March 2024, a360media announced a redesign of the magazine and a move to weekly publication. The magazine later returned to a biweekly schedule.

In December 2024, a360media merged with McClatchy to form the McClatchy Media Company. In May 2025, McClatchy announced that the print editions of First for Women, In Touch, Life & Style and Closer would cease publication. The company stated that it had been unable to develop a profitable business model for the four titles.
