= Hatje Cantz Verlag =

German publisher

- Parent company: Ganske Publishing Group
- Status: Active
- Founded: 1945
- Founder: Gerd Hatje
- Country of origin: Germany
- Headquarters location: Berlin, Germany; Stuttgart, Germany
- Key people: Holger Liebs (manager) Thomas PJ Feinen (managing director)
- Publication types: Books
- Nonfiction topics: Photography, art, architecture, design
- Official website: www.hatjecantz.de

Hatje Cantz Verlag (English: Hatje Cantz Publishing) is a German book publisher specialising in photography, art, architecture and design. It was established in 1945 by Gerd Hatje and has offices in Stuttgart and Berlin.

Hatje Cantz Verlag has a backlist of nearly 800 titles. Its photography books cover documentary and editorial photography, political and social issues, and landscape; its art books cover fine art and conceptual art.

Hatje Cantz has been part of the Ganske Publishing Group since 2011.

== History ==
The publisher was established in 1945 by Gerd Hatje. In 1990 it was sold to J. Fink Holding. After the bankruptcy of J. Fink Holding in 2011, Hatje Cantz Verlag became part of the Ganske Publishing Group.

== Books ==
Hatje Cantz has a backlist of nearly 800 titles, including the following:

- Peter Bialobrzeski's Heimet (2005)
- Felice Beato's Japanese Dream (2012)
- Christo's Valley Curtain (1973)
- Nadav Kander's Yangtze – The Long River (2010) and Bodies: 6 Women, 1 Man (2012)
- Pablo Picasso's Suite Vollard (1956)
- Taryn Simon's Birds of the West Indies (2013)
- Andy Warhol – the first monograph on him (1970)
