= Nargis (magazine) =

Azerbaijan-based lifestyle magazine

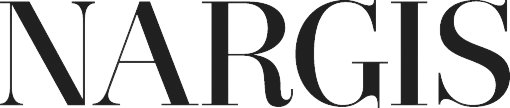

- September, 2018 cover featuring Donatella Versace
- Editor: Ulviyya Mahmud
- Categories: Fashion, Art
- Frequency: Monthly
- Total circulation: 10,000
- First issue: September 13, 2012; 14 years ago
- Company: Nargis Publishing House
- Country: Azerbaijan (other countries also available)
- Based in: Baku
- Language: Russian and other languages
- Website: www.nargismagazine.az

Nargis (pronounced [NH-AR-GHIS], Azerbaijani “nərgiz” – “narcissus”) is a magazine about fashion, lifestyle, beauty, art, cinema and music, published since 2012 in Azerbaijan.

== History ==
The magazine was named in honor of the rector of the Lomonosov Moscow State University Baku Branch, the professor Nargiz Pashayeva, who was on the cover of the first issue. The First Lady of Azerbaijan Mehriban Aliyeva attended the presentation of the first issue, that was held on January 13, 2013. The magazine has printed issue in Russian language and web-version in three languages: Azerbaijani, Russian and English.

Nargis magazine has celebrated its fifth anniversary in Paris within Haute Couture Fashion Week in January 2018. Also, Nargis invited one of the legendary Parisian photo studios – Studio Harcourt. As noted by the sales director of Studio Harcourt Pauline Rust Johnkman, for the first time studio agreed for Nargis to place its logo on the photos along with the name of the magazine. This is the first precedent, because the policy of Studio Harcourt assumes the presence on the pictures only of the studio logo.

Nargis Magazine was presented in Tbilisi on February 28, 2014. Later that year, Nargis Magazine Georgia was launched on December 22. Tako Chkheidze became editor-in-chief of Nargis Georgia magazine and the First Lady of Georgia, Maka Chichua appeared on the cover.
