= Asjraq =

Magazine published in West Sumatra, Dutch East Indies

- April 1925 edition
- Frequency: Monthly
- First issue: January 1925; 101 years ago
- Final issue: 1928; 98 years ago
- Country: Dutch East Indies
- Based in: Padang, West Sumatra (1925–1929); Padang Panjang, West Sumatra (1929–1930s)
- Language: Malay

Asjraq, later titled Soeara Kaoem Iboe Soematera (Enhanced Spelling: Suara Kaum Ibu Sumatera, meaning "Voice of Sumatran Women"), was a Malay-language women's magazine published in West Sumatra, Dutch East Indies (modern-day Indonesia), between 1925 and the 1930s. Initially headed by an editorial board of men, leadership of the magazine was soon taken over by women from diverse women's organizations in the region. Articles published in Asjraq openly criticized the treatment of women in Minangkabau society and advocated for improved education. Similar themes were found in the magazine's short fiction.

== History ==
Asjraq was first published in January 1925 and printed by De Volharding, using a title derived from the Arabic word for "east". Dates were provided using both the Hijri and Gregorian calendars. The magazine, made available to the general public, was offered at subscription fee of one gulden per three months. Publication was monthly.

Initially, Asjraq was led by a committee of three men: R. Effendi, M. Rasjid Manggis, and Abisin Abbas. To promote the magazine and seek women's involvement, they toured four cities in West Sumatra, speaking with women's organizations in Koto Gadang, Fort de Kock (now Bukittinggi), Payakumbuh, and Padang Panjang. By reaching out to the region's women's organizations, such as Meisjebond, Kaoem Iboe, and Vrouwenbond, they hoped to facilitate communication between these groups. With the fourth issue, the initial committee announced that their "duties as men" to guide the publication had been completed. New committees, consisting entirely of women, were appointed in Padang (T. S. Moro, Fatimah, and Rawani), Fort de Kock (S. Ramalah, Sjafiah, Anjus Almatsir), and Payakumbuh (Sjamsoe, Aisjah, Ratna, Ramulnas). To facilitate the distribution of Asjraq, agents were appointed in different organizations. Funding for publication activities was obtained through the sale of handicrafts.

Asjraq continued to be published until 1928. In 1929, it was acquired by the Sarikat Kaoem Iboe Soematra (Association of Sumatran Women, SKIS)—an umbrella organization of women's groups—and retitled Soeara Kaoem Iboe Soematera (Voice of Sumatran Women). Publication shifted to Padang Panjang, with the magazine headquartered at the women's teachers' college. Soeara Kaoem Iboe Soematera continued to be published into the 1930s.

== Contents ==
Rather than use cover art, Asjraq provided inspirational quotes, with the April 1925 edition featuring one by Rabindranath Tagore.

Asjraq contained several regular columns, including news on women's organizations, recipes, and advice. The magazine promoted the emancipation of Minangkabau women, openly criticizing the disadvantages and inequalities they faced. The magazine called for improved education for women, with one article citing mothers' role as the first educators of their children as a justification. Other articles called for women to become actively involved in politics and the public sphere to challenge oppressive social structures, and criticized the practice of child marriage. The historian Jeffrey Hadler describes Asjraq as "one of the first Minangkabau women's activist organizations to have an explicitly public, political agenda."

Asjraq also contained space for fiction and poetry. Short fiction published under the banner "Senggama Poestaka Melajoe" ("Touching on Malay Literature") included several works by an author writing as Si Tjantik ("The Beautiful"). These stories frequently used traditional Minangkabau settings, but are read by Salsabila Yumna Al-Insyi and Wannofri Samry of Andalas University as subtly criticizing contemporary practices such as arranged marriages. Other works of fiction included serials such as "Djoerang Jang Tiada Dapat di Djembatani" ("The Abyss That Cannot Be Bridged") by Rineff and "Manakah Tjinta jang Sebenarnja!" ("Where Is True Love!") by Roselty.

== Works cited ==
- Al-Insyi, Salsabila Yumna; Samry, Wannofri (2025). "Asjraq Magazine 1925–1928: Minangkabau Women and Modernity". Jurnal Sejarah Peradaban Islam. 9: 68–79. doi:10.30829/juspi.v9i1.22920.
- Hadler, Jeffrey (2009). Muslims and Matriarchs: Cultural Resilience in Indonesia Through Jihad and Colonialism. Singapore: NUS Press. ISBN 978-9971-69-484-5.
- Hanani, Silfia (2018). "Women's Newspapers as Minangkabau Feminist Movement Against Marginalization in Indonesia". Global Journal Al-Thaqafah. 8 (2): 75–83. doi:10.7187/GJAT122018-7.
- Setiawati, Devi Hajar Nur (2008). "Asjraq: Perempuan Bersatu Tak Bisa Dikalahkan" [Asjraq: Women United Cannot Be Defeated]. In Setyowati, Hajar Nur (ed.). Seabad Pers Perempuan: Bahasa Ibu, Bahasa Bangsa [A Century of Women's Press: Mother Tongue, National Language] (in Indonesian). Yogyakarta: I:boekoe. pp. 67–70. ISBN 978-979-1436-08-3.
