= Kim (magazine) =

Women's magazine in Turkey (1992–1999)

- Editor-in-chief: Duygu Asena
- Categories: Women's magazine
- Publisher: AD Publishing
- Founded: 1992
- Final issue: 1999
- Country: Turkey
- Based in: Istanbul
- Language: Turkish

Kim (Turkish: Who?) was a Turkish language women's magazine existed between 1992 and 1999 in Istanbul, Turkey. The magazine held feminist ideas and values and was among the most popular and best-selling magazines in Turkey during the 1990s.

== History and profile ==
Kim was established in 1992 with the motto "personal is political". The founding company was the AD Publishing. Duygu Asena was named editor-in-chief of Kim in 1993. It featured articles on the equality of women, discrimination against women and social gender which were mostly written by Duygu Asena. The readers of the magazine were middle-class women aged 20-30.

Duygu Asena, in an interview, reported that Kim was very similar to Kadınca and its continuation. Because both dealt with women-related topics such as relationships, sex, beauty, and fashion and adopted a liberal feminist ideology which was used as a vehicle in their struggle against traditional religious laws and customs. However, Asena also stated that Kim was more political and addressed younger women unlike Kadınca. Süheyla Kırca also provides some differences between these two magazines indicating that Kim did not focus on sport, environmental issues and employment which were among the frequent topics in Kadınca. Kim folded in 1999.
