= Asena (belly dancer) =

Turkish dancer

- Born: Onur Çakmak; 14 December 1977 (age 48); Istanbul, Turkey
- Occupations: Belly dancer, choreographer, singer, TV personality
- Years active: 1993–present
- Spouse: Hasan Dere (m. 2017; div. 2025)

Asena (born Onur Çakmak; 14 December 1977) is a Turkish belly dancer, choreographer, singer, and television personality. She rose to prominence in the late 1990s and 2000s for modernizing Turkish oriental dance and introducing it to international audiences.

== Early life and education ==
Asena was born in Istanbul, Turkey. Her father was originally from Rize, and her mother was of Russian origin. Raised by her grandmother in Germany from infancy, she studied ballet for three years and returned to Turkey at the age of 15. She completed her high school education in tourism and later graduated from Marmara University's Tourism and Hotel Management Department. She also studied hotel management at Istanbul Bilgi University and received modeling and etiquette training at the Language and Culture Centre.

== Career ==
Asena began dancing professionally in 1995, initially performing on a television program hosted by Mustafa Topaloğlu . After a brief hiatus to complete her education, she returned to the stage in 1999. Her energetic performances and theatrical flair helped elevate oriental dance into Turkish mainstream media. She became known for performing at private events attended by international figures such as Bill Clinton, Tina Turner, Mick Jagger, Mel Gibson, and Elizabeth Taylor.

Asena later pursued music, releasing albums and singles such as "Hint Kumaşı" and "Çatır Çatır." She also appeared on several reality shows and competitions, including:

- Benimle Dans Eder Misin? (2005) – Judge
- Buzda Dans (2007) – Contestant
- Survivor Türkiye (2011)
- Benzemez Kimse Sana (2012)
- Ben Burdan Atlarım (2013)

She served as the vice president for oriental dance at the Turkish Dance Sports Federation until 2009 and is also a licensed kickboxer.

== Personal life ==
Asena had a widely publicized relationship with singer İbrahim Tatlıses that ended in 2003. She married businessman Hasan Dere on 7 October 2017. In later years, she moved to Germany and became more private in her lifestyle. She and Dere divorced in 2025.

In 2003, she survived a gunshot wound to her leg in an incident that garnered media attention.

== Discography ==
- Asena Oyun Havaları (2001)
- Asena 2005 (2005)
- Hint Kumaşı (2010)
- Çatır Çatır (2011)
- Asena Volume I (2014)

== Legacy ==
Asena is widely credited with bringing renewed visibility and modern appeal to Turkish belly dancing. Her style influenced a new generation of performers and helped reposition oriental dance in Turkish pop culture.

Scholars such as Oyku Potoglu-Cook have highlighted Asena’s significance in merging elite and popular performance styles. Her collaboration with pianist Anjelika Akbar in the concert *Bach à L’Orientale* was praised for blending ballet and oriental dance aesthetics. Her instrumental rendition of “Warda” became a hit in the Istanbul tourist scene, marking a high point in her recorded music career.
