= Kadınca =

Monthly women's magazine in Turkey (1978–1998)

- Editor-in-chief: Duygu Asena (1978-1992)
- Categories: Women's magazine
- Frequency: Monthly
- Founder: Duygu Asena
- First issue: December 1978
- Final issue: 1998
- Country: Turkey
- Based in: Istanbul
- Language: Turkish

Kadınca (Turkish: Womanly) was a monthly women's magazine published in Istanbul, Turkey, between 1978 and 1998. It played an important role for Turkish feminist movement. It was the first popular feminist women's magazine published in Turkey.

== History and profile ==
Kadınca was established in 1978. The first issue was published in December 1978. The founder and launch editor-in-chief was Turkish journalist Duygu Asena. Her tenure ended on 1 March 1992.

Kadınca which was published on a monthly basis was modeled on British second-wave feminist magazine Spare Rib and American second-wave feminist magazine Ms.

The target audience of Kadınca was Turkish women aged between 20–30 from middle and lower middle classes. Following its launch in 1978 Kadınca began to cover topics that were not common in Turkish media discourse, including abortion, unwanted pregnancy, birth control, problems of housewives and professional women, violence against women, female sexuality and marriage problems. It also featured interviews with women from the fields of literature and business. Over time the magazine became one of the most significant supporting media outlet for feminist movement in Turkey. The magazine argued that women should have economic independence and have equal rights in society and in marriage. It adopted a liberal feminist ideology which was used as a vehicle in its struggle against traditional religious laws and customs. Another women's magazine Kim which was also edited by Duygu Asena shared this focus with Kadınca. In 1998 Kadınca folded due to financial causes.
