= Trubus =

Indonesian agriculture magazine

- Editor-in-chief: Sardi Duryatmo
- Categories: Agriculture
- Frequency: Monthly (1969-2024); Online (2025-present)
- Founder: Bambang Ismawan
- First issue: December 1969
- Final issue: December 2024 (print)
- Company: PT. Trubus Swadaya
- Country: Indonesia
- Based in: Depok
- Language: Indonesian
- Website: trubus.id
- ISSN: 0126-0057

Trubus (stylized in all caps) was an Indonesian monthly agriculture magazine.

== History ==
It was first published in December 1969.

Trubus provided articles on agriculture and is published on a monthly basis. The magazine was published the last issue in December 2024. Trubus brand currently only exists in its online portal trubus.id.
