= Mother and Baby =

1951 British TV instructional series

Mother and Baby is a British television series which aired on the BBC during 1951. The series followed the first twelve weeks of life of a baby named David Malcolm Suckling. It aired fortnightly for six episodes aired in a 20-minute time-slot.
