= Indonesia Expat =

Indonesian English language magazine

Indonesia Expat is a free monthly English language publication in Indonesia. The magazine is owned by PT Koleksi Klasik Indonesia and its head office is in Jakarta. It has the tagline "Indonesia's biggest expatriate readership".

== History and profile ==
The magazine was first published on 29 July 2009 under the title Jakarta Expat. In April 2011, it was acquired by PT Koleksi Klasik Indonesia. A sister publication with the same concept, Bali Expat, was launched in May 2012 and was distributed in Bali, the Gilis, Lombok and Jakarta. In 2014, Jakarta Expat and Bali Expat merged under the new title of Indonesia Expat.

The publication is printed on glossy 70gr art paper and has a mixture of news, humour, cultural pieces, business columns, opinions, profiles of expats living in the country, events, classifieds and advertisements.
