= Texas Family Magazine =

- Categories: Family and parenting
- Frequency: Bi-Monthly
- First issue: December 2005
- Country: USA
- Based in: Sugar Land, TX
- Language: English

Texas Family Magazine is a bi-monthly American magazine published in Sugar Land, Texas. It is a self-styled "parenting handbook" with content focused on parenting, health, education and fashion. Some of the notable past covers of Texas Family have included Debbie and Roger Clemens, Joel and Victoria Osteen, Dana Vollmer, Ricardo Chavira, Laura Miller, and Whitney Ott.
