= Bella (British magazine) =

British women's magazine

- Cover of 15 October 2024 issue
- Categories: Women's weekly magazine
- Frequency: Weekly
- Total circulation (Jan-Dec 2022): 87,500
- Founded: 1987; 38 years ago
- First issue: 5 October 1987
- Company: Bauer
- Country: United Kingdom
- Based in: London
- Language: English
- Website: www.bellamagazine.co.uk
- ISSN: 0953-0983

Bella is a weekly magazine aimed at women, currently published in the United Kingdom by H Bauer Publishing, the UK subsidiary of the German-owned family business, the Bauer Media Group.

== History and profile ==
Bella was started in 1987. The first issue was published on 5 October 1987. It was the first magazine published in the UK by Bauer and continues to be one of the strongest selling women's magazines in the country overall. A new issue is published every Tuesday. The headquarters of the magazine is in London.

For the first half of 2013 Bella had a circulation of 209,022 copies.
