= Nameh-e Banuvan =

Women's magazine in Iran (1920–1921)

- Categories: Women's magazine
- Frequency: Biweekly
- Publisher: Shahnaz Azad
- Founder: Shahnaz Azad
- First issue: 1920
- Final issue: 1921
- Country: Qajar Iran
- Based in: Tehran
- Language: Persian

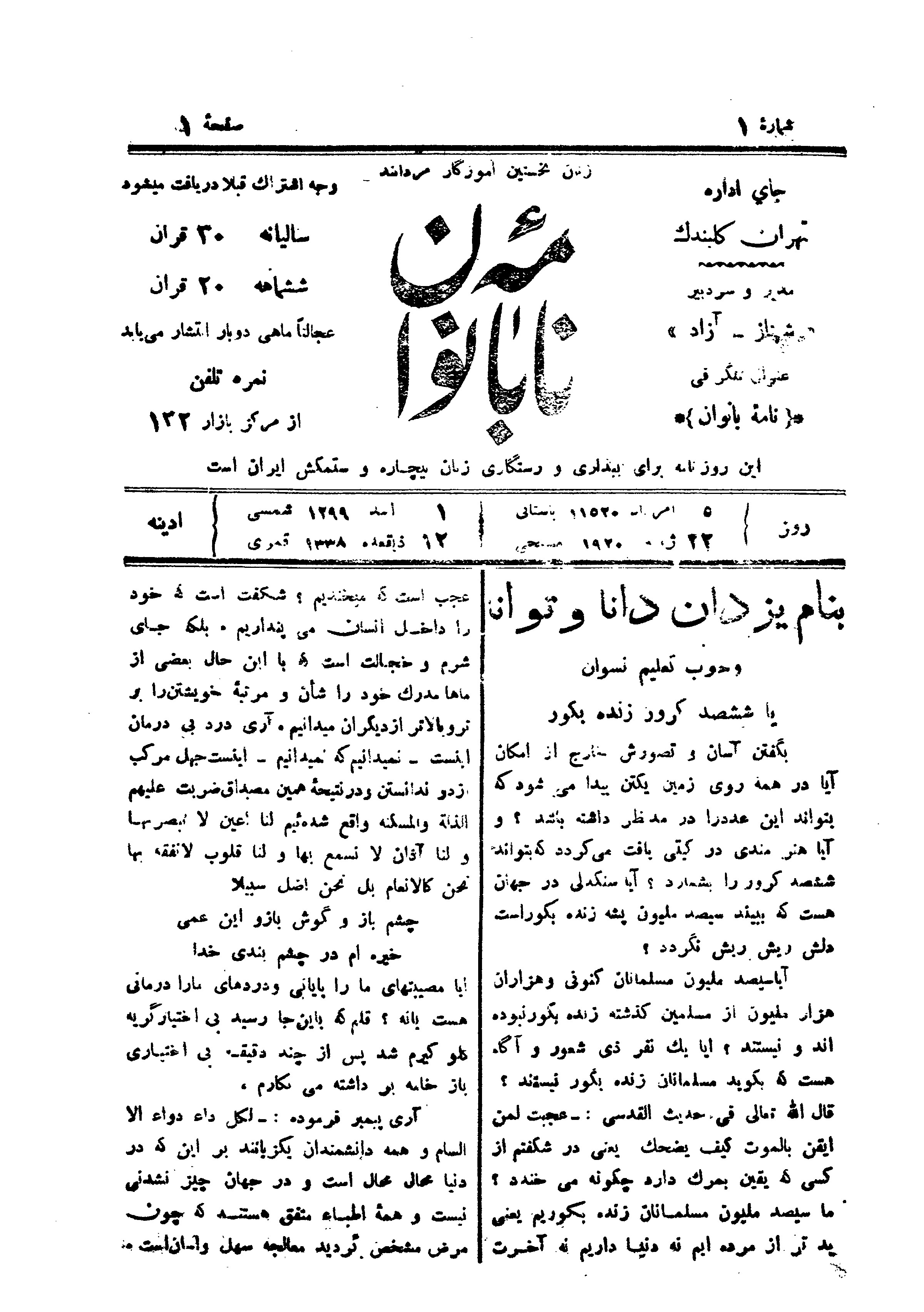
First page of the first issue of Nameh-e Banuvan

Nameh-e Banuvan (Persian: Women's Letters) was a women's magazine published in 1920 and 1921 in Persia (now Iran). It was one of the publications that were started before Reza Shah's established his rule in Iran. Its founder was Shahnaz Azad who was also the publisher. The magazine was based in Tehran. The magazine was published biweekly and stated that its aim was to encourage the emancipation of the Iranian women. It also attempted to remind male audience that women were their primary teachers.
