= Isteri Soesila–Taman Moeslimah =

Magazine in the Dutch East Indies

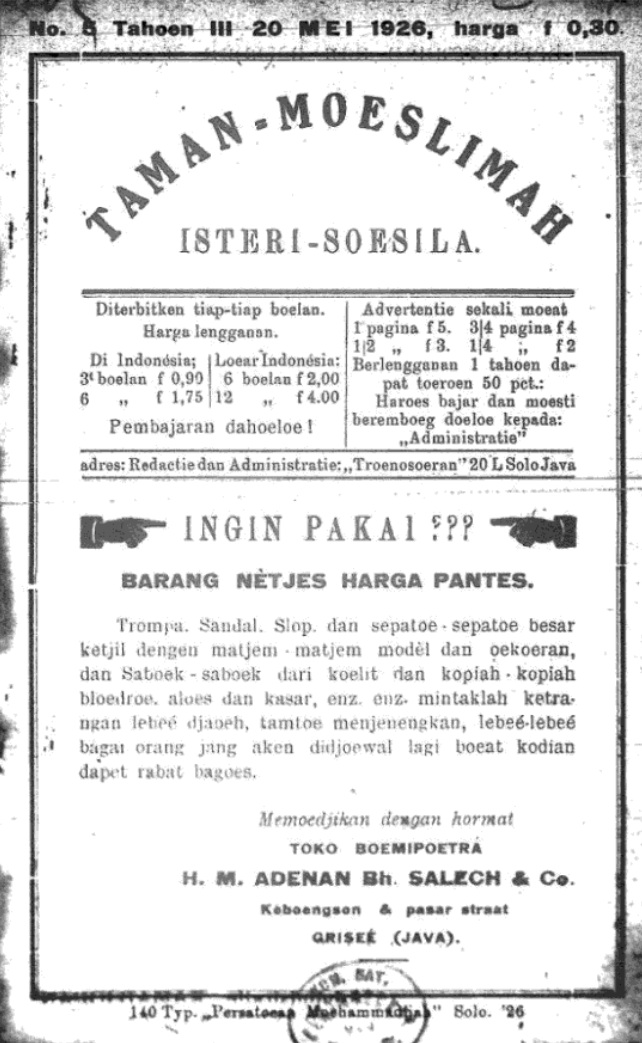
- Cover, 20 May 1926
- First issue: May 1924; 102 years ago
- Final issue: 1926; 100 years ago
- Country: Dutch East Indies
- Based in: Surakarta, Central Java
- Language: Malay

Isteri Soesila–Taman Moeslimah (Enhanced Spelling: Istri Susila–Taman Muslimah, transl. Ethical Wife–Garden of Muslim Women), also known simply as Isteri Soesila or Taman Moeslimah, was an Islamic women's magazine published in Surakarta, Central Java, Dutch East Indies (now Indonesia), between 1924 and 1926. Headed by Sjamsoel Hadiwijata, the magazine was a Malay-language accompaniment to the Javanese-language Worosoesilo. Its articles primarily dealt with women's issues, with much of its discussion based on the Qur'an and the hadiths.

== History ==
Isteri Soesila was established as a Malay-language edition of Worosoesilo, a Javanese-language women's magazine established in Surakarta, Central Java, in 1923. The first edition was published on 20 April 1924, with Sjamsoel Hadiwijata—a teacher and the editor of Worosoesilo—in charge. Most of its board were women, including manager Siti Sjamsijah.

In its inaugural issue, Isteri Soesila identified itself as being published to address misinformation about Islam and the position of women within the religion. To attract attention, free copies were sent to the local nobility (bangsawan), as well as government officials, merchants, and teachers. Subscriptions were available at 0.90 Dutch guilder per three months for consumers in the Dutch East Indies, with discounts available when bundling with Worosoesilo or subscribing for a longer period. The magazine remained in publication through 1926, receiving support from women's organizations such as Wadining and Suci Ati. The magazine was affiliated with Muhammadiyah, a reformist Islamic movement established by Ahmad Dahlan in 1912.

== Format and contents ==
The first edition of Isteri Soesila was eight pages in length, with the June 1924 edition reaching 22 pages. It measured 12 cm × 21 cm (4.7 in × 8.3 in). Many articles were written by women, with names such as Soekati, Soekarmi, and Soeparmini recorded. Other articles were written by men, with the July 1924 edition containing a piece by the kyai (scholar) Moechtar Boechari that emphasized the need for love and respect in marriage and later issues carrying content by his students B. Soediriah and Mohammad Marjo.

Articles included in Isteri Soesila were oriented towards women and dealt with issues such as homemaking, education, healthcare, and advances in the women's rights movement; one article, for example, reproduced a speech from an Indian da'i (preacher) regarding women's strength and importance. While Isteri Soesila focused primarily on women's role in the domestic sphere, it also advocated education, and presented men and women as interdependent equals, with women retaining the right to advocate for truth even when it is denied by their husbands. Nonetheless, Isteri Soesila also emphasized that men and women were created differently, framing women's primary duties being "pregnancy, childbirth, parenting, and child education". It urged them to accept modernity in accordance with their fitra (natural disposition), which it claimed to preclude adopting "men's professions" (e.g. as doctors, machinists, or politicians) and mixing with men in public settings.

Religious topics were frequently discussed in Isteri Soesila, including the proper etiquette expected of Muslim women, as well as women's obligations in Islam as well as the proper techniques for worship. Articles included discussion of polygyny in Islam as well as the practice of veiling. The magazine cited the Qur'an and hadiths in its call for education, as well as its discussion of gender issues. In presenting men and women as equals, for instance, it referred to Verse 1 of Surah An-Nisa, which describes men and women as derived from the same essence.

In its 25 June 1924 issue, Isteri Soesila emphasized the lengthy colonialization of the Indonesian Archipelago, writing that the Indies had long been in the grip of other nations and religions. Several articles negatively framed Christianity, which was then perceived as attempting to infiltrate Surakarta society. At the same time, Isteri Soesila did not universally condemn the foreign, with two 1925 articles highlighting women in the Philippines as positive examples of modern womanhood.

== Works cited ==
- Afghani, RP. M. Himam Awan; Saepudin, Didin; Rahman, Syaifur; Muarofah, Ulfiatul (2025). "Discourses of Women's Movements and Struggles in Muslim Women's Mass Media in 1912–1942". Buletin Al-Turas. 31: 125–138. doi:10.15408/bat.v31i1.43873.
- Amini, Mutiah (2025). "Analysing Women's Rights in Islam through the Critical Perspectives of Javanese Kyai Moechtar BoecharI from 1919 to 1926". Indonesia and the Malay World. 53 (155): 1–15. doi:10.1080/13639811.2025.2463267.
- Blackburn, Susan; Bessell, Sharon (1997). "Marriageable Age: Political Debates on Early Marriage in Twentieth-Century Indonesia". Indonesia (63): 107–141. doi:10.2307/3351513. JSTOR 3351513.
- Dewi, Kurniawati Hastuti (2012). "Javanese Women and Islam: Identity Formation since the Twentieth Century". Southeast Asian Studies. 1 (1): 109–140. doi:10.20495/seas.1.1_109. hdl:2433/155197.
- Fauzia, Amelia (2004). Tentang Perempuan Islam: Wacana dan Gerakan [About Muslim Women: Discourses and Movements] (in Indonesian). Jakarta: Gramedia Pustaka Utama. ISBN 978-979-22-1055-2.
- Formichi, Chiara (2025). Domestic Nationalism: Muslim Women, Health, and Modernity in Indonesia. Redwood City, California: Stanford University Press. ISBN 978-1-5036-4443-4.
- Mahayana, Maman S. (2023). Gerakan Emansipasi: Suara Pers Perempuan (1908—1928) [Emancipation Movement: The Voice of Women's Press (1908—1928)]. Jakarta: Yayasan Pustaka Obor Indonesia. ISBN 978-623-321-212-0.
- Primasari, Devi Kusumastuti (2008). "Istri Soesila–Taman Moeslimah: Majalah Perempuan yang Religius" [Istri Soesila–Taman Moeslimah: A Women's Magazine for the Religious]. In Setyowati, Hajar Nur (ed.). Seabad Pers Perempuan: Bahasa Ibu, Bahasa Bangsa [A Century of Women's Press: Mother Tongue, National Language] (in Indonesian). Yogyakarta: I:boekoe. pp. 64–66. ISBN 978-979-1436-08-3.
