= Terakki-i Muhadderat =

Women's magazine in Ottoman Empire (1869–1870)

- Editor: Ali Raşit
- Categories: Women's magazine
- Frequency: Weekly
- Founded: 1869
- First issue: 27 June 1869
- Final issue: September 1870
- Country: Ottoman Empire
- Based in: Constantinople
- Language: Ottoman Turkish

Terakki-i Muhadderat (Ottoman Turkish: Progress of Muslim Women) was a weekly women's magazine which was published in the period 1869–1870 in Constantinople, Ottoman Empire. It was the first Ottoman publication which specifically targeted women.

== History and profile ==
Launched in 1869 Terakki-i Muhadderat was the first women's magazine in the Ottoman Empire. The magazine was a weekly supplement of Terakki (Ottoman Turkish: Progress) newspaper. It was published on Sundays. The first issue of the magazine appeared on 27 June 1869.

The only editor of the magazine was Ali Raşit. Terakki-i Muhadderat mostly published the letters from women living in Constantinople. It also featured articles written by women dealing with education, Islam, polygamy and the daily problems of discrimination against themselves. The magazine ceased publication in September 1870 after producing a total of forty-eight issues.
