= İnci Asena =

Turkish poet

- Born: 1948 (age 77–78); Istanbul, Turkey
- Education: Istanbul University
- Occupation: Poet
- Spouse: Halit Çapın
- Children: 1
- Relatives: Duygu Asena (sister)
- Beauty pageant titleholder
- Title: Miss Turkey 1966
- Major competitions: Miss Turkey 1966 (Winner); Miss World 1966 (Unplaced)

İnci Asena (born in 1948) is a Turkish publisher, poet and beauty pageant titleholder who was crowned Miss Turkey 1966 and represented her country at Miss World 1966.

Born on April 1, 1948 in Istanbul, her mother was Nihal Öndersev and her father was the merchant Muhtar Asena. She is the granddaughter of Ali Şevket Öndersev, a deputy of the Republican People's Party, who was Atatürk's aide, the niece of Democratic Party deputy Vacit Asena, and the sister of writer Duygu Asena. She also used the signature “Ani Toros” in some of her works.

== Life ==
She was born to Muhtar and Nihal in Istanbul, Turkey in 1948. She is the younger sister of Duygu Asena, a notable journalist. She graduated from the School of English studies at Istanbul University.

In 1966, she participated at the Miss Turkey beauty contest under the pseudonym Aylin Öndersev, which actually was her aunt's name, who died young. She won the contest. She married journalist Halit Çapın, and gave birth to a daughter named Berfu. Her marriage ended with divorce lasting briefly.

== Literature career ==
In 1990, she established a publishing company named Adam Yayınları. Her poems appeared in Adam Sanat, a literary periodical of the company. In some of her poems, she used the pen name Ani Toros. She also wrote books, and is a member of PEN International.

== Books ==
Her books are the following:

- 1992: Türk Yazınından Seçilmiş Aşk Şiirleri (Collected poems)
- 1993: Türk Yazınından Seçilmiş Ayrılık, Özlem, Yalnızlık Şiirleri (Collected poems)
- 1993: Tramvay Döşeriz Ay Döşeriz (Poetry)
- 1994: Dünya Yazınından Seçilmiş Mektuplar (Collected letters)
- 1996: Çıplak Bakamıyorum (Poetry)
- 1998: Üç Gün Paris: Fotoğraf Arkası Notları (Travel)
- 1999: Amsterdam’dan Fotoğraf Arkası Notları (Travel)
- 2000: Tutamadığım Sözler (Poetry)
- 2000: Yirminci Yüzyılda Yazınımıza Elverenler (Collected biography)
- 2001: Maskeler (Short Story)
- 2005: Aldanış (Novel)
