= Bahana (magazine) =

Indonesian christian magazine

- Categories: Christian magazine
- Frequency: Monthly
- First issue: July 1989
- Company: Andi Publisher
- Country: Indonesia
- Based in: Sleman Regency
- Language: Indonesian
- Website: ebahana.com
- ISSN: 0852-3924

Bahana was an Indonesian Christian monthly magazine.

== History ==
It was first published in 1989.

The first edition of this magazine was published on 16 July 1989 with a main report entitled Si Boy Masuk Gereja (The Boy Enters the Church), piggybacking on the popularity of the film Catatan Si Boy (Si Boy's Notes). The first two editions of this magazine were filled with topics that were identical to young people because it was originally designed as an educational media for school and college students. Entering the third edition, the format was changed to target adult readers and families.
