= Duygu Asena =

Turkish journalist, best-selling author and activist (1946-2006)

Duygu Asena (19 April 1946 – 30 July 2006) was a Turkish journalist, best-selling author and activist for women's rights.

== Biography ==
She was born in Istanbul as the daughter of Nihal and Muhtar Asena. His father was in the sesame business. His grandfather is CHP Gümüşhane deputy Ali Şevket Öndersev. The poet İnci Asena is also her sister. After completing her secondary education at Kadıköy Private Girls' College, she studied at Istanbul University Pedagogy Department. Starting her career as a pedagogue, Asena worked at Haseki Hospital Children's Clinic and Istanbul University Children's House. Her first article in the newspaper was published in the Kelebek supplement of the Hurriyet newspaper in 1972. Since then, she has been a journalist and manager in various magazines and newspapers. She was the editor-in-chief of Kadınca magazine, one of the most important women's magazines in Turkey, between 1978 and 1992. She also served as Kim magazine. She prepared and presented a program called Ondan Sonra (After That) on TRT-2 television channel (1992–1997).

Continuing her writing as well as journalism, Asena made a name for herself with her first book, Kadının Adı Yok. The book was banned in 1988 because it was considered obscene. After a long lawsuit, it was allowed to be re-released and then filmed by director Atıf Yılmaz in the same year. Because of her writings and the themes she touched on in her books, Asena became known as a feminist writer. Asena died on 30 July 2006 at the VKV American Hospital, where she was being treated for a brain tumor. She was buried in Zincirlikuyu Cemetery. Turkey P.E.N. The Writers' Association awarded Duygu Asena an award for her services to the Turkish women's movement in 2006 and gave the first award to İpek Çalışlar for her biography of Latife Hanım.

Duygu Asena Awards are still being given. In 2022, Seray Şahiner was deemed worthy of this award for her novel "Ülker Abla".

== Bibliography ==
- Kadının Adı Yok (The Woman Has No Name), 184 pp., 1987, 59th edition 2004, ISBN 975-506-122-3 (also in Greek and Italian)
- Aslında Aşk da Yok (Actually, There Is Also No Love), 192 pp., 1989, 40th edition 2004, ISBN 975-506-128-2
- Kahramanlar Hep Erkek (Heroes Are Always Men), 160 pp., 1992, 23rd edition 2005, ISBN 975-506-108-8
- Değişen Bir Şey Yok (There Is Nothing Changed), 118pp., 1994, 43rd edition 2004, ISBN 975-325-000-2
- Aynada Aşk Vardı (There was Love in the Mirror), 360 pp., 1997, 22nd edition 2004, ISBN 975-325-456-3
- Aslında Özgürsün (Actually, You Are Free), 276 pp., 2001, 21st edition 2004, ISBN 975-6612-14-2
- Aşk Gidiyorum Demez (Love Does Not Say ‘I Am Leaving’), 208 pp., 2003, 14th edition 2003, ISBN 975-293-083-2
- Paramparça (Torn in Pieces), 157 pp., 2004, 14th edition 2006, ISBN 975-293-205-3

German language

- Die Frau hat keinen Namen (The Woman Has No Name), 174 pp., 1992, Piper, München, ISBN 3-492-11485-7
- Meine Liebe, Deine Liebe (My Love, Your Love), 215 pp., 1994, Piper, München, ISBN 3-492-11792-9

Dutch language

- De vrouw heeft geen naam (The Woman Has No Name), 219 pp., 2005, de Kern, ISBN 90-325-1011-8
- Eigenlijk ben je vrij (Actually, You Are Free), 222 pp., 2005, de Kern, ISBN 90-325-1006-1

French language

- Une femme n'a pas de nom (The Woman Has No Name), 224 pp., 2025, Bianchi Édition, ISBN 978-2-9585142-3-5

== Awards ==
- 1988 – "People at the Summit" by Magazine "Nokta"
- 1988 – "Best Author" by Boğaziçi University for Kadının Adı Yok
- 1995 – "Best Author" by Boğaziçi University
- 1998 – "75 Women in 75 Years" Award
