= Maxi (magazine) =

German women's magazine

- Categories: Women's magazine
- Frequency: Monthly
- First issue: 1998
- Company: Bauer Media Group (1998-2018); Ocean Global (2020-present)
- Country: Germany
- Based in: Kiel
- Language: German

Maxi was a German women's monthly magazine.

== History ==
It was first published in 1998.

In 2015, the editorial departments of Maxi and Myway were merged. In spring 2018, Maxi's editorial headquarters were moved from Hamburg to Munich and Myway was discontinued. In December 2018, Maxi was also discontinued.

Since March 2020, the magazine has been published ten times a year by the Kiel-based publisher Ocean Global, which acquired a license for it from the Bauer Media Group.
