= Life & Style (magazine) =

Celebrity magazine published in the United States

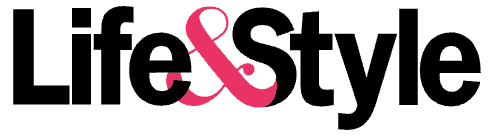
- Editor-in-chief: David Perel
- Categories: Gossip magazine
- Frequency: Weekly
- Circulation: 488,807
- Publisher: American Media, Inc.
- Founded: 2004
- Final issue: June 2025
- Country: United States
- Based in: Englewood Cliffs, New Jersey
- Language: English
- Website: www.lifeandstylemag.com

Life & Style, officially Life & Style Weekly, was an American celebrity and lifestyle magazine. It was launched by Bauer Publishing in 2004. In 2018, American Media, Inc. acquired the American celebrity magazines of the Bauer Media Group.

Although it is celebrity-focused, the magazine is geared towards lifestyle trends, and bills itself on "helping readers incorporate" celebrity beauty, clothing and body trends into their own lifestyle. However, as of 2014 the focus has been more focused on celebrity news.

A German edition was published by the Bauer Media Group from May 2008 to July 2012.

Its print edition ceased publication in June 2025, although its website continued to operate as part of the McClatchy Media Network.

== History ==
Bauer Publishing launched ''Life & Style Weekly'' on November 1, 2004. The magazine was aimed at women in their twenties and thirties and combined fashion, beauty and lifestyle coverage with celebrity news.

In 2018, American Media, Inc. acquired Bauer Media Group's American celebrity magazines, including Life & Style. American Media was later renamed a360media, which merged with McClatchy in 2024.

In May 2025, McClatchy announced that the print editions of Life & Style, In Touch, Closer and First for Women would cease publication between June 20 and 27, stating that it had been unable to develop a profitable business model for the four titles.

A German edition was published by Bauer Media Group from May 2008 to July 2012.
