= Ganske Publishing Group =

German publishing holding company

Ganske Verlagsgruppe
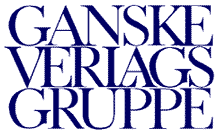
- Type: Holding company (private)
- Industry: Publishing (books, magazines, electronic media)
- Founded: 1907
- Founder: Richard Ganske
- Headquarters: Hamburg, Germany
- Number of locations: Munich and other cities
- Key people: Thomas Ganske (CEO, owner)
- Products: Books, magazines, electronic publishing, distribution, retail
- Brands: Hoffmann und Campe dtv Gräfe und Unzer; Hatje Cantz Verlag; Jahreszeiten Verlag; Für Sie; Merian; Guinness World Records
- Number of employees: ~2,000
- Subsidiaries: 18 companies

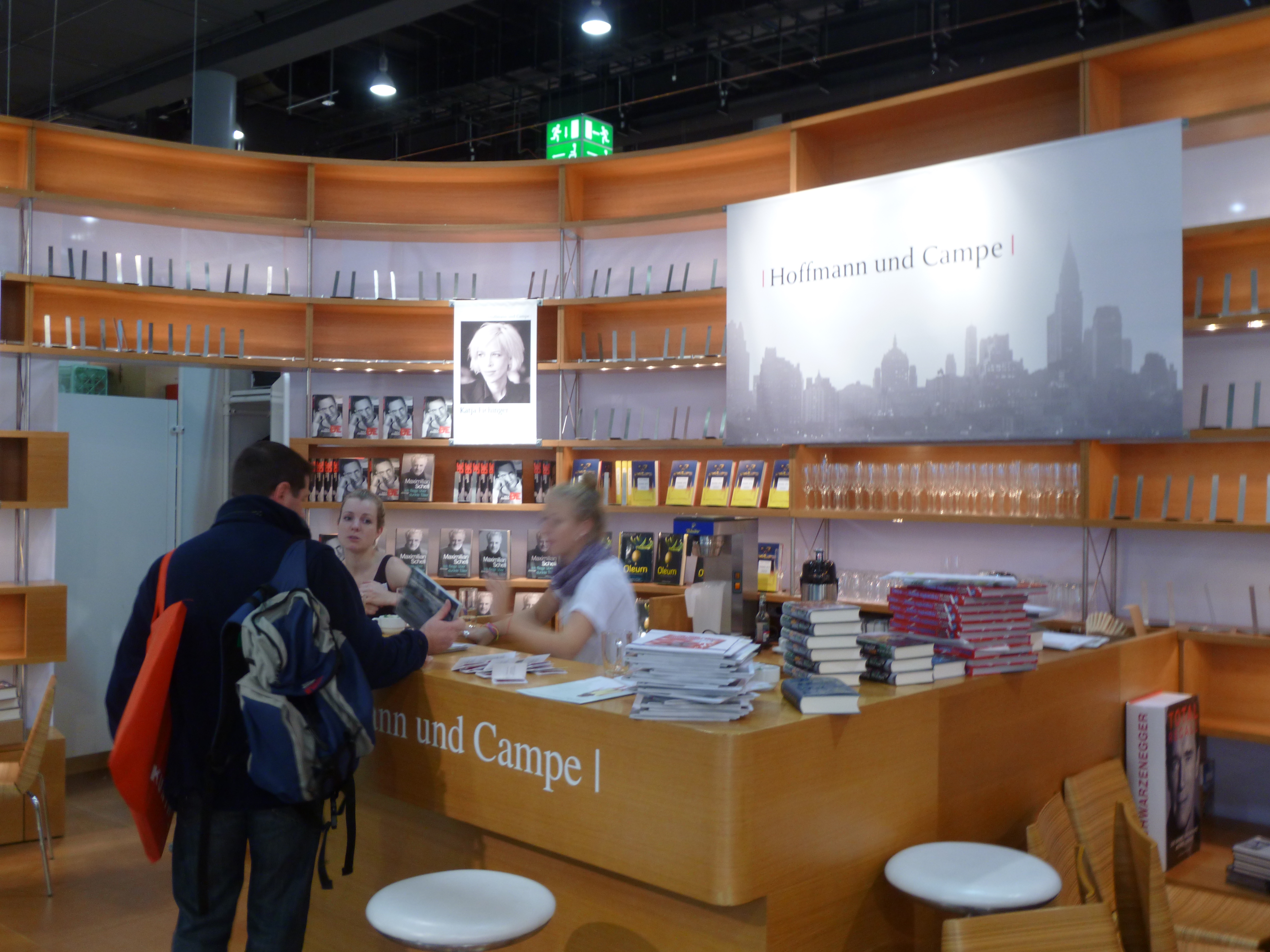
Stand of the Hoffmann & Campe publishing group at the Frankfurter Buchmesse 2012

Ganske Verlagsgruppe (translated Ganske Publishing Group) is a German publishing holding company comprising eighteen distinct companies. The group is active mainly in book and magazine publishing with an emphasis on travel, gourmet, lifestyle, and architecture, orientated towards an upscale market. It has approximately 2,000 employees. The corporate headquarters are in Hamburg, with offices in Munich and several other cities.

Licensed versions of the group's magazines as well as corporate publishing products such as the BMW Magazine and the Relais & Chateaux Magazine are published throughout the world.

The group started avantgarde ventures such as the weekly newspaper Die Woche and monthly magazine TEMPO, breeding several well known journalists and experimenting with new styles that later became staples of the journalistic toolbox. It has been the target of several unsuccessful takeover attempts.

Under the leadership of publisher Thomas Ganske, Ganske Verlagsgruppe has made significant investments in its digital assets – the online presence of its magazines, community blogs, and content for navigation devices.

== History ==
Alles über Wikipedia Book (without the cover), published by Hoffmann & Campe, Hamburg 2011. ISBN 978-3-455-50236-7 (DNB)

In 1907, Richard Ganske established the magazine subscription service Lesezirkel daheim in Kiel, which would later become the current group of companies.

In 1938, the Lesezirkel maintained 30 outlets throughout Germany serving 180,000 customers. In 1941, Kurt Ganske – the son of the company's founder – invested in the Hoffmann und Campe Verlag in Hamburg. Nine years later, he took over the remaining shares of the publishing house. After his father's death in 1979, Thomas Ganske, the current owner, took on responsibility for the group. Thomas Ganske has gradually restructured the company since 1990. In 2001, these measures resulted in setting up the Ganske Verlagsgruppe as a holding company of which he became chief executive officer.

== Business Units ==
Book Publishing

- HOFFMANN UND CAMPE
- HOFFMANN UND CAMPE Corporate Publishing
- DEUTSCHER TASCHENBUCH VERLAG (dtv)
- GRÄFE UND UNZER
- TEUBNER
- HALLWAG
- GUINNESS WORLD RECORDS
- TRAVEL HOUSE MEDIA
- MERIAN Live!
- GUIDE MICHELIN
- Hatje Cantz Verlag

Magazine Publishing (Jahreszeiten Verlag)

- FÜR SIE
- PETRA
- VITAL
- DER FEINSCHMECKER
- WEIN GOURMET
- MERIAN
- A&W Architektur & Wohnen
- COUNTRY
- ZUHAUSE WOHNEN
- SELBER MACHEN
- PRINZ

Electronic Publishing

- iPUBLISH
- MERIAN scout (navigation software)
- Kartographie
- Travel and Event Databases

Distribution / Retail / Hotel

- LESERKREIS DAHEIM
- PRESSE SERVICE GESELLSCHAFT
- WERBE MERKUR
- RHENANIA BUCHVERSAND
- AKZENTE VERSANDBUCHHANDLUNG
- Mail:Order:Kaiser
- FRÖLICH UND KAUFMANN Art Books
- HOTEL HOHENHAUS (a Relais & Chateaux member)
