= Freundin =

Biweekly women's magazine in Germany

- Categories: Women's magazine
- Frequency: Fortnightly
- Publisher: Burda Style Group
- Founded: 1948; 78 years ago
- Company: Hubert Burda Media
- Country: Germany
- Based in: Munich
- Language: German
- Website: freundin.de
- OCLC: 310976090

Freundin (German pronunciation: [ˈfʁɔʏndɪn], lit. '(female) friend') is a biweekly women's magazine published in Munich. Launched in 1948, it is one of the earliest magazines in its category.

== History and profile ==
Freundin was established in 1948. The magazine is part of Hubert Burda Media and is published by Burda Style Group on a fortnightly basis on Wednesdays. The headquarters of the magazine is in Munich. The magazine targets women from the age of 25 years.

Freundin started its website in 1996. Renate Rosenthal is one of its former editors-in-chief. Nikolaus Albrecht was the editor-in-chief of Freundin between 2012 and 2019.

== Circulation ==
In 2001, Freundin was the thirty-fifth best-selling women's magazine worldwide with a circulation of 605,000 copies. The magazine sold 465,418 copies during the fourth quarter of 2003. During the fourth quarter of 2004 its circulation was 517,269 copies. The circulation of the magazine 516,443 copies in 2010. It sold 366,039 copies in the fourth quarter of 2014. The magazine sold 237,867 copies in the first quarter of 2018 making it the second best-selling women's magazine in Germany.

== See also ==
- List of magazines in Germany
