= In Touch Weekly =

Celebrity magazines published in the United States

- Editorial Director: David Perel
- Categories: Tabloid / Gossip
- Frequency: Weekly
- Total circulation: 595,614 (June 2012)
- Founded: 2002
- Final issue: June 2025
- Company: American Media, Inc.
- Country: United States
- Based in: Englewood Cliffs, New Jersey
- Language: English
- Website: InTouchWeekly.com
- ISSN: 1540-8280

In Touch Weekly was an American celebrity gossip magazine. The magazine is focused on celebrity news, fashion, beauty, relationships and lifestyle, and is geared towards a younger readership, billing itself as "fast and fun", along with making claims about their lower cover price on their front cover to encourage buyers to purchase their magazine rather than the other titles on a supermarket checkout rack. It usually targets younger women and teenage girls.

== History and profile ==
The magazine was launched in 2002 by Bauer Publishing; Richard Spencer was editor from its launch until 2010. American Media, Inc. acquired Bauer's US celebrity magazines in 2018.

The magazine shares a publisher with its sister magazine Life & Style Weekly, a similar weekly gossip magazine. Whereas In Touch is focused more on celebrity gossip, Life & Style bills itself on giving readers lifestyle tips on how to incorporate celebrity beauty and fashion into their lives.

On September 18, 2006, after the death of Daniel Wayne Smith, son of Anna Nicole Smith, Getty Images sold the last photos taken of Daniel alive at his mother's bedside to In Touch Weekly and Entertainment Tonight for a reported $650,000.

On May 21, 2015, the magazine controversially released a police investigation of Josh Duggar from the 19 Kids and Counting reality TV show, from an investigation carried out in 2006, when Josh was 18 years of age, about events occurring in 2002, when Josh was 14 and still a minor, when he was accused of molesting his sisters and several other girls. No charges were ever filed. Although the magazine was criticized for releasing the report, the Springdale, Arkansas, city attorney and several legal experts said that since Josh was 18 at the time of the investigation and all minors' names were redacted, the release was permitted under Arkansas' Freedom of Information Act.

In Touch Weekly and its successive parent companies have faced lawsuits from people including Duggar, Richard Simmons, Blake Shelton, David Beckham, Tom Cruise and Judy Sheindlin alleging causes of action including defamation and invasion of privacy.

The magazine announced it would print its final issue in June 2025.
