= Woman's World =

American weekly magazine

- Categories: Women's health
- Frequency: Weekly
- Total circulation: 802,200 (2024)
- Founded: 1981
- Company: McClatchy Media Company
- Country: United States
- Language: English
- Website: www.womansworld.com
- ISSN: 0272-961X

Woman's World is an American supermarket weekly magazine with a circulation of 2.2 million readers. Woman's World's is targeted towards middle-class women over 50 years old. It is associated with tabloid magazines and is priced accordingly. The magazine also publishes articles online.

It concentrates on short articles about subjects such as weight loss, relationship advice and cooking, along with feature stories about women in the STEM fields and academia. It previously held the title of the most popular newsstand women's magazine, with sales of 77 million copies in 2004. It competes with more general-market traditional magazines such as Woman's Day and the now-defunct Family Circle.

== History ==
The magazine was launched in the United States in 1981 by a European magazine publisher, Heinrich Bauer Verlag of Hamburg, Germany, which set up an American subsidiary, Heinrich Bauer North America in Englewood Cliffs, New Jersey. Woman's World was the company's first American release, and was aimed at a target audience of middle-class mothers. The magazine gained rapid popularity, and within ten years had a circulation of 1.5 million readers, generating US$15 million in annual revenue.

A different magazine with the same name, but with no connection to the current one, was published in the United States 1884–1940. It has no connection to a local television series of the same name aired on WKRG-TV in Mobile, Alabama.

== Circulation and business model ==
''Woman's World'' was developed around newsstand and supermarket sales rather than the subscription-led model used by many American magazines. Within ten years of its launch, the magazine had reached a circulation of 1.5 million readers and was generating an estimated $15 million in annual revenue for Bauer Publishing.

The magazine continued to rely heavily on retail sales in later years. In 2016, ''MediaPost'' reported that ''Woman's World'' had around 925,000 readers but fewer than 100,000 print subscribers. Bauer launched websites for Woman's World and First for Women that year as part of an expansion into digital publishing.

== Format ==
The magazine is published in a large tabloid newspaper format, with about 60 pages per issue, and approximately 12% of the magazine devoted to advertisements. The cover generally features several headlines for internal articles, along with a cover model who is generally an average woman rather than an actress or model. The cover model is highlighted for their accomplishments including: writing a popular recipe, writing an article about a health story or exercise regimen for the magazine, or their successful weight loss regimen. Celebrities are also featured occasionally on the cover. The magazine generally does not publish gossip features.
