= Petra (magazine) =

German monthly women's fashion magazine

- Editor-in-chief: Sabine Barteis
- Categories: Women's interest
- Frequency: Monthly
- Publisher: Mediengruppe Klambt
- First issue: 1964
- Country: Germany
- Based in: Hamburg
- Language: German
- Website: www.petra.de

Petra is a German monthly women's fashion magazine.

== History ==
It was first published in 1964 by Constanze-Verlag, which merged to Gruner + Jahr in 1965. In 1969, the magazine was sold to Jahreszeiten Verlag.

In September 2018, the magazine was sold to Mediengruppe Klambt.
