= Bits & Pretzels =

- Company type: Startup Events UG
- Founded: 2014 in Munich, Bavaria, Germany
- Founder: Andreas Bruckschlögl, Bernd Storm and Felix Haas
- Products: Conference and workshops
- Website: bitsandpretzels.com

Bits & Pretzels is a three-day conference for founders and enthusiasts from the start-up scene, which takes place in Munich, Bavaria, Germany, during the Oktoberfest. So far, speakers included international and national founders and investors, among them the founders of Virgin, Airbnb, Lottoland, Shazam, Tinder, Zendesk and Evernote. The goal of the event is inspiration through lectures and the networking of the participants among each other.

== History ==
September 2014 the first founder event took place as a breakfast, which was founded by Andreas Bruckschlögl and Bernd Storm. Since January 2015, Felix Haas joined the team as the third co-host and since then the event is organized as "Bits & Pretzels". In May 2019, Britta Weddeling, formerly from Handelsblatt, joined as "Editor-in-Chief".

At the first event in September 2014, 1,400 participants came together in the ballroom of the Löwenbraukeller in Munich. Among the first speakers were the founders of Qype, mydealz, Stylight, and XING and various start-up pitches took place. Ilse Aigner, who is also the patron of the event, led a panel discussion on current political topics. The proceeds from the event were donated to the Munich Tafel.

The second Bits & Pretzels took place on 16 January 2015. This event already drew 1,800 participants. In addition to national speakers, international speakers were also present this time. Philip Inghelbrecht and Avery Wang gave a talk about SHAZAM! and talked about their initial problems. Other speakers included Jonathan Badeen from Tinder and Ray Chan from 9GAG.

The third Bits & Pretzels with around 3,500 participants took place from 27 to 29 September 2015. Instead of it being a breakfast, this event was planned as a three-day festival for the first time. The last day of the conference ended in the Schottenhamel tent at the Oktoberfest. The speakers included, among others, the CEO of Adidas Herbert Hainer or Niklas Östberg, CEO of Delivery Hero.

From 25 to 27 September 2016, over 5000 participants came together for 4th Bits & Pretzels. As in the previous year, the first two days took place at the International Congress Center of Messe München and the last day at the Oktoberfest. Speakers included the British entrepreneur Richard Branson, the American actor Kevin Spacey, the founder of Airbnb Nathan Blecharczyk, CEO of the Mozilla Foundation as well as the investors of the TV show Die Höhle der Löwen.

From 24 to 26 September 2017, another 5,000 participants came together in Munich, after the number of participants for this event was capped. The speakers at the 2017 event included Stefan Raab, the former World (Soccer) Players of the Year Philipp Lahm, and Oliver Kahn, the Dutch actress Carice van Houten (famous for her role in Game of Thrones) and the CEOs of adidas, Infineon and E.ON.

For the event in 2018, the satirist and television presenter Jan Böhmermann, the former F1 world champion Nico Rosberg, the founder of the #MeToo movement Tarana Burke, as well as the CEOs of Vodafone Germany, Volocopter and FlixMobility have already been confirmed.

== Schedule ==
At Bits & Pretzels, founders of national and international companies tell their success story and give tips. Keynotes, workshops, panel discussions, masterclasses, and a start-up competition are scheduled for the first two days of the conference at the International Congress Center in Munich. The speakers on the main stage wear Bavarian costume to combine Bavarian tradition with innovation. The third day of the event is all about networking, so once again all the participants come together at the Oktoberfest. Following the "Table Captain" principle, the young founders and investors network over beer and chicken in the packed Oktoberfest tent.

In 2017, "Topic Tables" revolving around one specific topic were introduced for the first time. With a Corporate Innovation stage and an Investor's stage, new areas of focus have been set in 2017. The topic of "matchmaking, was strengthened on site with a specially designated area to facilitate networking among the participants. In addition to industry-related content, an entertainment program with comedians and bands provided some diversion. In 2015, the Bavarian Comedian Harry G was on stage, and in 2016, the German band Sportfreunde Stiller gave a concert. In 2017, the band Moop Mama played in the Oktoberfest tent as a surprise. Previously implemented on a small scale, in 2017 the Bits & Pretzels Start-up Night, during which even non-Bits & Pretzels-participants were able to attend evening events all over Munich took place for the first time.

== Speakers (selection) ==
At the event, national as well as international speakers form start-ups, international companies and large DAX companies give speeches.

Year	Organization	Speaker
2014	Bigpoint	Heiko Hubertz
2014	Qype	Stephan Uhrenbacher
2014	Westwing	Delia Fischer
2014	Zooplus	Sven Rittau
2014	XING	Lars Hinrichs
2014	Jochen Schweizer	Jochen Schweizer
2014	mydealz	Fabian Spielberger
2015	9GAG	Ray Chan
2015	Tinder	Jonathan Badeen
2015	Tune	Peter Hamilton
2015	Shazam	Avery Wang and Philip Inghelbrecht
2015	Zendesk	Mikkel Svane
2015	Prezi	Peter Arvai
2015	Evernote	Phil Libin
2015	LeWeb	Loïc Le Meur
2016	Virgin	Sir Richard Branson
2016	Actor	Kevin Spacey
2016	Airbnb	Nathan Blecharczyk
2016	Mozilla	Mitchell Baker
2016	Nest	Tony Fadell
2016	Recode	Kara Swisher
2016	TechCrunch	Mike Butcher
2017	Comedian	Stefan Raab
2017	Actor	Carice van Houten
2017	Amazon	Werner Vogels
2017	E.ON	Dr. Johannes Antonius; Teyssen
2017	Infineon	Dr. Reinhard Ploss
2017	adidas	Kasper Rorsted
2017	Schranner Negotiation; Institute	Matthias Schranner
2017	Board Member; Linde, Munich Re & Metro	Prof. Dr. Ann-Kristin; Achleitner
2018	Comedian	Jan Böhmermann
2018	former F1 Driver	Nico Rosberg
2018	American civil rights activist	Tarana Burke
2019	US President	Barack Obama
2019	The Honest Company	Jessica Alba
2019	Dropbox	Drew Housten
2019	LinkedIn	Reid Hoffmann
2019	Shazam	Chris Barton
2019	Plug & Play	Saeed Amidi
2019	Freigeist	Frank Thelen

== Table Captains (selection) ==
The Table Captains are representatives from the fields of media, economics, or education, tasked with stimulating discussions at their assigned tables on the third day of Bits & Pretzels at the Oktoberfest. According to the "first-come, first-served" principle, participants can select in advance which table captain they would like to share the table with.

Table Captain	Position	Company
Katharina Borchert	Chief Innovation Officer	Mozilla Corporation
Jan Christe	Editor-in-chief	t3n Magazin
Alexander Görlach	Editor	The European
Wolfgang Grupp	Owner	Trigema
Florian Langenscheidt	Venture Capitalist	
Nico Lumma	Founder	Next Media Accelerator
Sonja Schwetje	Editor-in-chief	n-tv
Cherno Jobatey	Editor	Huffington Post
Max Wittrock	Founder	Mymuesli
Jess Erickson	Program Director	500 Startups
Alexander Kudlich	Managing Director	Rocket Internet
Adam Bird	Senior Partner	McKinsey & Company Inc.
Hannes Ametsreiter	Chief Executive Officer	Vodafone Germany
Ulrich Schäfer	Chief Business-Editor	Süddeutsche Zeitung Verlag
Antonella Mei-Pochtler	Senior Advisor	The Boston Consulting Group
Jackie Hunt	Member of the Board	Allianz
Ralf Wenzel	Chief Security Officer	Delivery Hero AG
Ralf Kleber	VP. Country Manager	Amazon.com
