= Felix Haas =

German entrepreneur and investor

- Born: Munich, Germany
- Education: Technical University of Munich

Felix Haas (born August 30), is a German entrepreneur and investor based in Munich. He is most known for founding Amiando and IDnow. He is also the co-organizer and host of Bits & Pretzels, Germany's largest founders' event.

Haas founded his first company, TiberiumSun Networks, in 1997, while still in high school. After completing his education and spending two years in Silicon Valley, he co-founded Amiando in 2006. The company was acquired by XING in 2010 and Haas co-founded IDnow in 2013. He is an active business angel investor. He has invested in over 50 internet startups in Germany and serves on the board of several companies.

== Education and early career ==
Haas was born and raised in Munich, Germany. While he was in high school, he actively attended computer and technology fairs. At a computer fair in Munich, he had the idea to develop a global content platform focused on computer games, movies and music. After working several weeks on designing the website, he launched tiberiumsun.com and founded TiberiumSun Entertainment in 1997. Haas completed his high school in 2000 and joined Technical University of Munich for B.Sc. in Electrical Engineering and Information Technology.

While studying at Technical University of Munich, Haas joined BMW as an intern and worked with the company in Munich and the USA. After completing his B.Sc., he enrolled for M.Sc. at Technical University of Munich and received his degree in 2006. During his MS.c., he also worked as a project supervisor on a collaborative project between BMW and Stanford University in Palo Alto. He was working on the BMW team that created Google Maps "Send to Car" and he co-authored the patent describing the link between internet mapping services like Google Maps and automobiles.

== Career ==
In 2006, Haas founded Felix Haas Investments to invest in start ups in Germany. Later in 2006, he co-founded Amiando, an online platform for event registration and ticketing. The company became very successful over the ensuing years and powered most of Europe's technology events including LeWeb, DLD or Online Marketing Rockstars. Amiando received wide recognition for its innovative approach in event ticketing as well for its innovative business model. In 2010, Amiando was awarded Global Technology Pioneer status by the World Economic Forum. It was later sold to XING the same year.

Haas left the position of CEO after the acquisition of Amiando and began focusing on investing in startups. In later 2012, he became a founding investor Kreditech, a big data infrastructure that allows for credit bureau independent acquisition, identification, scoring and retention management in consumer lending. The next year, together with his former Amiando co-founders, he co-founded IDnow, the first online solution for convenient and secure online identification of government IDs in Europe.

Since January 2015, Haas co-organizes and hosts Bits & Pretzels, a three-day founders' event, during Munich's Oktoberfest. Through Felix Haas Investments, he has invested in over 50 internet startups including JustBook, Iwoca, Whow Games, Jodel and Kaeuferportal. He is frequently invited to speak at Internet conferences and universities.

=== Not-for-Profit activities ===
In 2013, he was appointed as an advisor to the German Federal Ministry of Economics and Technology. In this role, he has been an advisor to the German Vice Chancellor and Minister, Sigmar Gabriel and a Member of official Advisory Group "Young Digital Economy". He also served on the board of Venturate, a platform for early-stage seed-financing for startups.
