= FPK =

FPK may refer to:

- Federal Party of Kenya
- Finsbury Park station, in London
- First People of the Kalahari
- Fitch H. Beach Airport, serving Charlotte, Michigan, United States
- Fokker–Planck–Kolmogorov equation, in physics and mathematics
- Fokofpolisiekar, an Afrikaner alternative music group
- Fox-Pitt Kelton Cochran Caronia Waller, an investment bank
- Free Pascal, an open source compiler
- Freedom Party in Carinthia (German: {[lang|de|Die Freiheitlichen in Kärnten}]), a political party in Caranthia, Austria
- PSL (rifle), a Romanian marksman rifle
