= Macquarie Group =

Australian investment bank and financial services company

Macquarie Group Limited

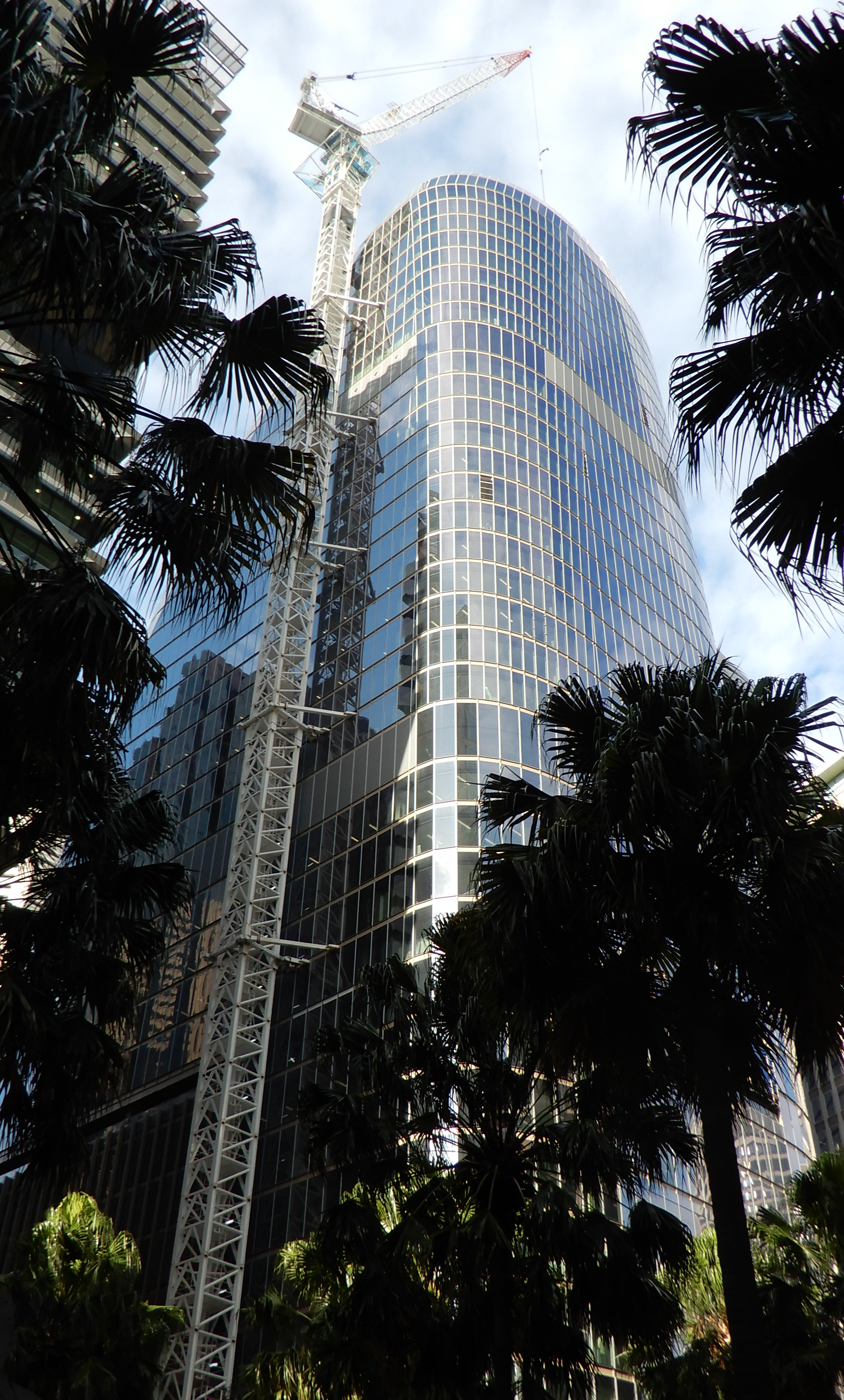
- 1 Elizabeth, Macquarie Group's global headquarters in Sydney, Australia
- Type: Public
- Traded as: ASX: MQG; S&P/ASX 50 component
- Industry: Financial services
- Founded: 10 December 1969; 56 years ago
- Headquarters: 1 Elizabeth Street, Sydney CBD, Australia
- Area served: Worldwide
- Key people: Glenn Stevens (chairman); Shemara Wikramanayake (CEO)
- Services: List of Services: Asset management; Investment banking; Corporate banking; Private equity; Consumer banking; Wealth management; Leasing; Asset financing; Equities trading; Commodity trading; Futures and options trading; Foreign exchange trading; Money market trading; Renewables development; Mergers and Acquisitions; Specialist advice; Investment management
- Operating income: ▼ A$16,887 million (2024)
- Net income: ▼ A$3,535 million (2024)
- AUM: ▲ A$938.3 billion (2024)
- Total assets: ▲ A$403,404 million (2024)
- Number of employees: ▲20,600 (2024)
- Divisions: Macquarie Capital; Macquarie Asset Management; Commodities and Global Markets; Banking & Financial Services
- Subsidiaries: MGL Subsidiaries: Macquarie Bank Limited; Delaware Investments; Macquarie Life Limited; Macquarie Prism; [Green Investment Group]; Arqiva (25%); One Rail Australia (49%); Blue Leaf Energy; Hobson Wealth Partners; Fox-Pitt Kelton Cochran Caronia Waller; Matrix Business Technologies; Matrix Networks Group; MQ Portfolio Management; MQ Capital; Network Finance Company; Cincinnati Bell; Waddell & Reed; Central Park Group LLC; Camin Cargo; Southern Water
- Capital ratio: 13.6%
- Rating: A (Fitch); A1 (Moody's); BBB+ (S&P)
- Website: www.macquarie.com

Macquarie Group Limited (/məˈkwɔːri/), more commonly known as Macquarie Bank, is an Australian multinational investment banking and financial services group headquartered in Sydney and listed on the Australian Securities Exchange. The company employs more than 20,000 staff across four operating groups in 34 markets.

Macquarie's investment banking division is Australia's top-ranked mergers and acquisitions adviser with more than A$871 billion in assets under management and is one of the world's largest infrastructure asset managers. Macquarie Bank's customers have an overall net wealth per capita of A$943,000 (as of March 2024), making them amongst the wealthiest in Australia.

== History ==
=== Hill Samuel Australia ===
Macquarie was founded on 10 December 1969 as Hill Samuel Australia Limited (HSA), a subsidiary of the UK's Hill Samuel & Co. Limited.

The group's logo is a stylised version of the holey dollar, Australia's first coinage, which was designed by Governor Macquarie.

Australian businessman Stan Owens compiled a proposal for Hill Samuel & Co. to establish an Australian subsidiary. After presenting his report in London, Owens was offered the role of implementing it. He became executive chairman of Hill Samuel Australia and founded the company from offices at Gold Fields House in Sydney's Circular Quay. The company's first three employees were Stan Owens, Blair Hesketh and Geoff Hobson. Later Chris Castleman (on loan from the British parent) and Bill Clarke joined. David Clarke and Mark Johnson were introduced to HSA and became joint managing directors in 1971. Despite being given a four-year allowance by the British parent to turn a profit, HSA was profitable by the end of its first twelve months of trading.

In 1971, HSA secured Australia's biggest mandate at the time, a US$60 million financing for corrugated iron manufacturer John Lysaght Australia. HSA expanded its presence in the Australian market, opening a Melbourne office in 1972, and a Brisbane office in 1975.

=== Macquarie Bank ===
The 1980s were marked by significant financial market deregulation in Australia, including the floating of the Australian dollar and the removal of restrictions on foreign banks. To capitalise on the opportunities offered by deregulation, HSA submitted a proposal for the formation of a new substantially Australian owned and controlled bank to be called Macquarie Bank Limited. Authority for HSA to become Macquarie Bank Limited (MBL) was received from the Paul Keating, then Federal Treasurer, on 28 February 1985, making it only the second private trading bank to be established in Australia in modern times.

The bank continued to grow its activities in the 1980s. It became Australia's leading bullion trader, initiated 24-hour foreign exchange trading, commenced stockbroking and corporate leasing activities, opened offices in London and Munich, expanded into funds management by establishing Australia's first cash management account and formed a new structured finance business which would grow to become one of the largest in the world. It also implemented the risk management framework which is credited for the organisation's long history of unbroken profitability. The framework ensured Macquarie was not materially exposed to the October 1987 global share market crash.

In other initiatives, Macquarie established its philanthropic arm, the Macquarie Group Foundation, which has since contributed more than $A330 million to community organisations around the world, and established what has become one of Australia's largest corporate art collections, the Macquarie Group Collection.

On 29 July 1996, Macquarie Bank Limited listed on the Australian Securities Exchange. By 30 October 1996, Macquarie had entered the ASX All Ordinaries Index, with a market capitalisation of approximately A$1.3 billion and would grow to more than $35 billion in 2018 to become one of Australia's largest listed companies.

Macquarie continued its overseas expansion during the early 1990s, opening offices in New York, Hong Kong, Singapore and Beijing, while extending its Australian operations to Perth and the Gold Coast. Acquisitions during the decade included Boston Australia Limited, Security Pacific Australia and the investment banking arm of Bankers Trust Australia.

In 1994, Macquarie began its infrastructure investment business with the underwriting and placement of publicly listed equity for the Hills Motorway in Sydney. It has continued to grow these activities to become the world's leading infrastructure manager. During the decade, Macquarie also launched its private banking and residential mortgages businesses and established a number of real estate and investment trusts.

Macquarie continued to expand its Asia operations in the early 2000s with the opening of offices in Seoul and Tokyo in 2000, and through the acquisition of ING Group's Asian cash equities business in March 2004.

The decade was also marked by the global expansion of Macquarie's infrastructure business, with infrastructure investment funds established in Korea, China, Europe, Russia, India and the Middle East. On 16 December 2004, Macquarie Infrastructure Corporation began trading as Macquarie Infrastructure Company Trust on the New York Stock Exchange (NYSE:MIC).

Macquarie made a number of significant acquisitions, particularly in the US, in the later part of the 2000s. These included US energy marketing and trading company Cook Inlet Energy Supply, establishing Macquarie's physical natural gas trading business in the US, and Constellation Energy's Houston-based downstream natural gas trading operations. As at 2018, Macquarie Group is the second largest physical gas trader in North America.

Other acquisitions included UK gas supply company Corona Energy in August 2006 and, in 2009, independent energy advisory firm Tristone Global Capital Inc; specialist investment bank Fox-Pitt Kelton Cochran Caronia Waller; Canadian wealth management business Blackmont Capital Inc; the wholesale electricity trading business of US firm Integrys Energy; US-based fixed income fund manager Allegiance Investment Management; the equity derivatives and structured products business of German private bank Sal. Oppenheim; and Condor Ferries service between the UK, Channel Islands and France.

In 2005, Macquarie announced an unsolicited takeover bid for the London Stock Exchange valuing the company at £1.5 billion, a bid rejected by LSE management.

=== Macquarie Group ===
In July 2006, Macquarie announced its intention to restructure the Macquarie Group into a non-operating holding company (NOHC) owning separate banking and non-banking groups so as to support continued growth across the Group's businesses, particularly internationally, whilst meeting the requirements of the Australian Prudential Regulation Authority (APRA). Establishment of Macquarie Group Limited as the NOHC was approved by the Federal Court in October 2007.

Also that year, Macquarie, via a deal in which it acquired Thames Water, a private utility company responsible for public water supply and waste water treatment in the London region of the UK, was found to have transferred to Thames Water £2bn of debt before selling its stake in the company. These disclosures followed scrutiny of the possible financial causes of Thames Water's extensive pollution of the River Thames, and other rivers, with untreated sewage between 2012 and 2014, for which Thames Water was fined a record £20m. In response to criticism, Macquarie noted that during its tenure Thames Water invested more than £11 billion, or around £1 billion per year, more than twice that invested during the five-year period before privatisation in 1989. The Lee Tunnel was commissioned in January 2010 and opened by Boris Johnson, then Mayor of London, in January 2016. The capital investment undertaken to London's water supply was the first major investment since the Victorian era. Debts in Thames Water had gone from £3.2bn to £10.5bn by the time Macquarie had sold its stake, whilst paying out £2.8bn in dividends to shareholders during their time in control. While Macquarie, once called a "vampire kangaroo" by the UK press, pulled out of Thames Water, in August 2021, it bought a majority stake in Southern Water. It invested £1.6 billion ($3.1 billion) in what has been described as the UK's second most fragile water business, which, in 2024, risked being hit by the collapse of the now heavily financially troubled Thames Water.

In 2010, Macquarie completed its then largest acquisition with the purchase of Delaware Investments, a US-based diversified asset management firm, from Lincoln Financial Group. As a result of the acquisition, Macquarie became one of the world's largest 50 asset managers. The same year, the company, through its subsidiary Macquarie Equipment Rentals, was criticised by the Australian Competition & Consumer Commission for suing 300 small businesses caught up in misleading telephony bundling deals.

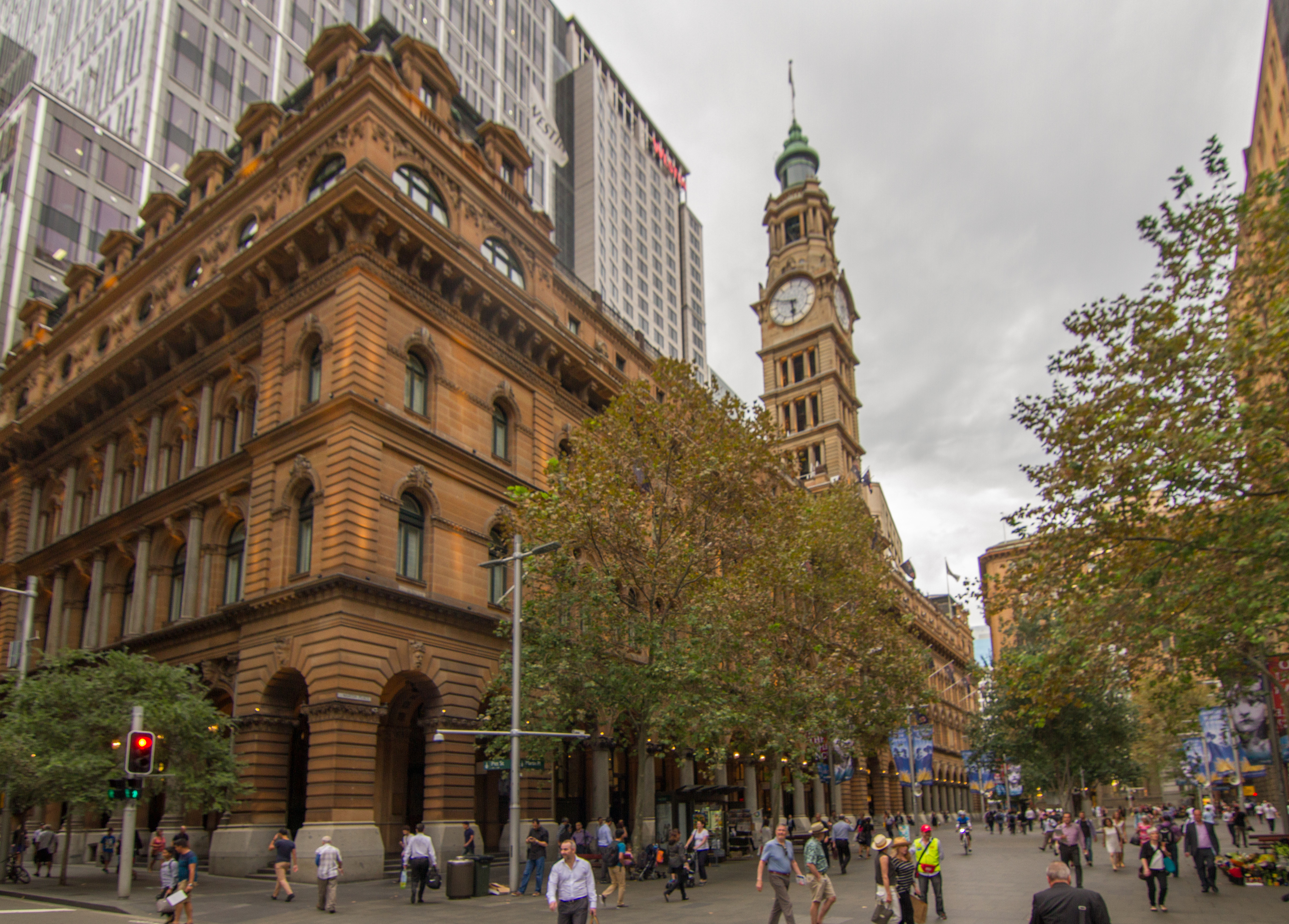
No. 1 Martin Place, one of Macquarie Group's offices in Sydney

In March 2012, Macquarie acquired the buildings located at 48–50 Martin Place and 9–19 Elizabeth Street from the Commonwealth Bank in preparation of their lease at current No. 1 Martin Place offices expiring in 2024.

In March 2014, the Private Equity Funds Management division — Macquarie Investment Management Private Markets (MIMPM) — was sold off to the former fund managers becoming ROC Equity Partners. In October 2014, Macquarie joins the Global Infrastructure Facility (GIF), formed as part of an initiative by the World Bank Group conceived under Australia's G20 2014 presidency, as an advisory partner to share market insight, advice and expertise with the GIF and its government partners.

In March 2015, Macquarie announced the acquisition of a US$4 billion aircraft operating lease portfolio from AWAS Aviation Capital, bringing Macquarie's portfolio up to more than 220 aeroplanes. In October Macquarie entered into an agreement to acquire the A$8.2 billion Esanda dealer finance portfolio from the ANZ Bank.

In June 2017, Macquarie's Commodities and Global Markets business completed its acquisition of Cargill's petroleum business as well as its North America power and gas business. The transaction expanded Macquarie's global financial and physical oil business footprint to include Geneva and Minneapolis.

In August 2017, a Macquarie-led consortium acquired the UK Green Investment Bank plc from the UK government as the result of the 'Future of the Green Investment Bank inquiry' that concluded that it was by original design to operate as an investment bank and in providing finance on fully commercial terms to achieve both green impact and strong profits the government should move GIB into private ownership so it can carry on doing what it does best – but funded by the private sector, rather than using public funds and free to borrow from the capital markets as necessary without this affecting public sector debt. Macquarie then rebranded it as a subsidiary called the Green Investment Group (GIG).

=== Recent history ===
In 2018, Shemara Wikramanayake succeeded Nicholas Moore as CEO.

In the financial year ending 31 March 2021, Macquarie reported net profit of A$3.015 billion and a final dividend per ordinary share of A$4.70 per share.

In September 2021, Cincinnati Bell, which also owns Hawaiian Tel since their July 2018 merger, was fully acquired by Macquaire Infrastructure Partners V.

In 2021, the company announced the purchase of Kansas City-based asset management company Waddell & Reed for A$2.3 billion.

Also in 2021, Macquarie entered into a binding agreement to acquire AMP Capital's Global Equity and Fixed Income (GEFI) business in Australia for A$185 million. This resulted in the A$47 billion transfer of assets to Macquaire Asset Management upon completion on 28 March 2022.

In March 2022, Macquarie Asset Management completed its acquisition of Central Park Group, an independent investment advisory company specialising in alternative investment strategies for high-net-worth investors.

In November 2023, Macquarie Capital Principal Finance announced the acquisition of energy testing and inspection services provider – Camin Cargo for an undisclosed amount.

In July 2024, the company took full ownership of National Gas in the UK, after acquiring the final 20% of the company from National Grid plc.

In April 2025, Macquarie agreed to sell its USA and European public asset management businesses – Macquarie Management Holdings, Inc, Macquarie Investment Management Holdings (Luxembourg) S.à r.l. and Macquarie Investment Management Holdings (Austria) GmbH, to Nomura in a A$$2.8 billion all-cash deal. The transaction, expected to close by the end of 2025, encompasses approximately A$$285 billion in assets across equities, fixed income and multi-asset strategies.

In February 2026, Macquarie AirFinance (MAF) was sold to Dubai Aerospace Enterprise (DAE) in a sale valued at US$7 billion.

== Structure ==
Macquarie has a non-hierarchical organisational structure where individual business entities are managed under four principal operating groups. These businesses work closely together, specialising in defined products or markets. There are also four shared services groups that provide the framework, infrastructure and support to the principal businesses.

=== Annuity-style businesses ===
Macquarie's annuity-style businesses consists of Macquarie Asset Management (formerly Macquarie Funds), Corporate and Asset Finance and Banking and Financial Services.

- Macquarie Asset Management (MAM) – is the world's biggest infrastructure asset manager and a top 50 global asset manager, managing more than $735.5 billion of asset on behalf of investors across multiple asset classes globally.
- Banking and Financial Services (BFS) – is Macquarie's retail bank offering personal banking, wealth management and business banking products and services to approximately 1.7 million clients, advisers, brokers and business clients.

=== Capital markets facing businesses ===
Capital Markets facing activities are undertaken by Macquarie Capital (formerly Investment Banking Group) and most businesses in Commodities and Global Markets, which was formed after the merger of Macquarie Securities Group (merger of Macquarie Capital Securities and the Macquarie Equity Markets Group), and the Commodities and Financial Markets Group (formerly Fixed Income, Currencies and Commodities).

- Macquarie Capital (MacCap) – advises companies on growth opportunities, sources investment funds, negotiates transactions and lists companies on the share market, as well as investing alongside clients.
- Commodities and Global Markets (CGM) – is a global business offering capital and financing, risk management, market access, physical execution and logistics solutions to its diverse client base.

=== Central services groups ===
Macquarie has a network of support groups that provide a range of functions supporting the principal Operating Groups, ensuring they have the appropriate workplace support and systems to operate effectively and the necessary resources to meet their regulatory, compliance, financial, legal and risk management requirements.

- Corporate Operations Group (COG) – provides specialist services under divisions that include technology, digital transformation and data, operations, human resources, business services/workplace, data, digital, corporate strategy, operational risk management, business resilience and global security, and the Macquarie Group Foundation.
- Financial Management Group (FMG) – is the financial hub of Macquarie focused on managing Macquarie's funding and capital. It provides strategic capital, tax and financial analysis and advice to senior management to support the growth of Macquarie's businesses around the world. It ensures Macquarie continues to meet its financial, regulatory and tax reporting compliance obligations in the jurisdictions in which Macquarie operates, and maintains relationships on behalf of the Group with a wide range of stakeholders such as regulators, partners, communities and shareholders.
- Legal and Governance Group (LGG) – brings together Macquarie's global team of dedicated lawyers, governance professionals, and the technical specialists, management, legal operations, and administrative staff who work with them.
- Risk Management Group (RMG) – forms the second line of defence and provides independent and objective review and challenge, oversight, monitoring and reporting in relation to Macquarie's material risks. Divisions include Compliance, Credit, Financial Crime Risk, Internal Audit, Market Risk, Operational Risk, Prudential Risk, and Central Risk.

=== Licences ===
Macquarie holds a number of licences enabling it to conduct activities in the jurisdictions in which it operates and is regulated by a significant number of regulators globally. In Australia, Macquarie Bank Limited holds a banking licence and as an authorised deposit-taking institution (ADI), is supervised by the Australian Prudential Regulation Authority (APRA). Other key Australian regulators include the Australian Securities & Investments Commission (ASIC) and AUSTRAC. Globally, key regulators include the UK FCA and PRA; US CFTC, FINRA, NFA, FERC, SEC and Federal Reserve Board; IIROC; MAS; Hong Kong SFC; HKMA; SEBI; Japan FSA; Korean FSS; and New Zealand FMA.

== Regulatory breaches ==
=== 2013 enforceable undertaking ===
In January 2013 ASIC accepted an Enforceable Undertaking (EU) from Macquarie Equities Limited (MEL), part of Macquarie Group, after identifying widespread failures in its financial advice arm, Macquarie Private Wealth (MPW).

ASIC’s surveillance, starting in December 2011, uncovered serious and recurring compliance issues dating back to 2008. These included:

- Client files not containing statements of advice
- Advisers failing to demonstrate reasonable basis for advice provided to the client
- Poor client records and lack of detail contained in advice documents
- A lack of supporting documentation on files to determine if there was a reasonable basis for the advice provided to the client, and
- Failing to provide sufficient evidence that clients were sophisticated investors.

ASIC noted that MEL had been aware of these deficiencies for years but had failed to implement effective or timely remediation. As a result, ASIC required MEL to address systemic compliance failures that posed risks to consumers and market integrity.

=== 2021 breaches of prudential and reporting standards ===
In April 2021 the Australian Prudential Regulation Authority (APRA) found that Macquarie Bank incorrectly treated certain intra‑group funding arrangements when calculating its Capital Requirement and related entity exposure metrics. It also breached liquidity reporting standards between 2018 and 2020. This raised serious concerns about the bank’s risk‑management and reporting practices. As a result, APRA imposed additional requirements on Macquarie Bank:

- An “operational capital overlay” of AUD 500 million to address operational risk stemming from its intra‑group structure.
- A 15% add‑on to the net cash outflow component of its Liquidity ratio (LCR) calculation.
- A 1% adjustment to the Available Stable Funding component of its Net stable funding ratio (NSFR) calculation.

APRA’s Deputy Chair, John Lonsdale, emphasised the importance of legally‑binding prudential and reporting standards, stating that the nature of the breaches by a major institution like Macquarie is “disappointing and unacceptable”.

=== 2025 OTC derivatives and futures compliance breach ===
In May 2025 ASIC imposed additional licence conditions on Macquarie Bank after repeated and long‑standing compliance failures in its futures dealing business and OTC Derivatives trade reporting. Key failures reported by ASIC included:

- Misreporting of more than 375,000 OTC derivative transactions, some for years without detection.
- Failure to prevent suspicious orders in the electricity futures market shortly after being fined nearly $5 million by ASIC’s Markets Disciplinary Panel.
- Weak internal controls: poor change‑management, unclear roles, incomplete process knowledge and data‑governance issues.

ASIC’s Commissioner, Simone Constant, emphasised the recurrent nature of the failures and the need for sustainable, not “band‑aid”, fixes.

== Leadership ==
Macquarie Group Limited's (MGL) corporate governance consists of five standing board committees that assist the Board in its oversight role: a Board Audit, Board Remuneration, Board Risk, Board Governance and Compliance and Board Conflicts Committee.

=== Executive committee ===
The executive committee manages the organisation as a whole and comprises the chief executive officer, Chief Financial Officer, Chief Risk Officer, Chief Operating Officer, Group General Counsel, CEO of Macquarie Bank Limited and heads of Macquarie's operating groups.

Current Executive Committee members are:

- Managing director and CEO (MGL) – Shemara Wikramanayake
- Deputy managing director and head of Banking and Financial Services Group – Greg Ward
- Chief financial officer and head of Financial Management Group – Alex Harvey
- Head of Macquarie Asset Management – Ben Way
- Managing director and CEO (MBL) – Stuart Green
- Group general counsel and head of Legal and Governance Group – Evie Bruce
- Head of Macquarie Capital – Michael Silverton
- Head of Commodities and Global Markets – Simon Wright
- Global chief operating officer and head of Corporate Operations Group – Nicole Sorbara
- Chief risk officer and head of Risk Management Group – Andrew Cassidy

=== Board of directors ===
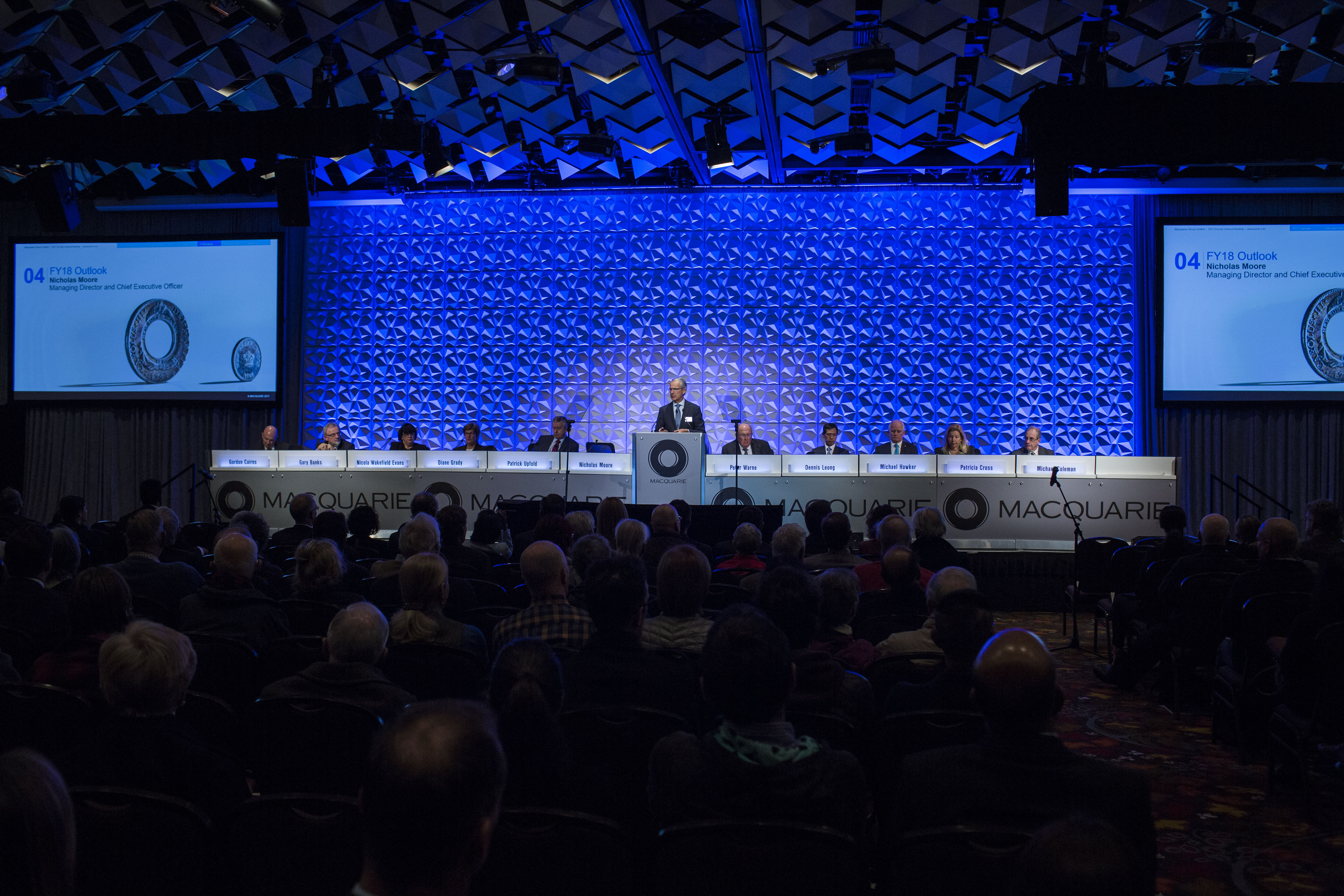
Macquarie Board Presention

The Board has eight Directors, comprising seven independent directors and one executive director, who is the Macquarie Group managing director and chief executive officer (CEO).

Macquarie Group Limited current Board of Directors includes:

- Glenn R Stevens AC – Independent chairman, Independent Voting director, a director of the Anika Foundation and the Lowy Institute and former Governor of the Reserve Bank of Australia.
- Shemara Wikramanayake – managing director, chief executive officer and Executive Voting director.
- Jillian R Broadbent AC – Independent Voting director; chair of the Board of Swiss Re Life and Health Australia, chancellor of the University of Wollongong and a director of Woolworths Australia, the National Portrait Gallery of Australia and the Sydney Dance Company.
- Phillip M Coffey – Independent Voting director; non-executive director of Lendlease, a member of the Clean Energy Finance Corporation Board and chairman of the Westpac Bicentennial Foundation.
- Michelle A Hinchliffe – Independent Voting director; non-executive Director of BHP, Santander UK and Santander UK Group Holdings
- Susan J Lloyd-Hurwitz – Independent Voting director; director of Rio Tinto and Spacecube
- Michael J Coleman – Independent Voting director; adjunct professor at the Australian School of Business at the University of New South Wales, chairman of Planet Ark Environmental Foundation and former senior audit partner with KPMG.
- Diane J Grady AM - Independent Voting director; a member of the McKinsey Advisory Council and a director of Spotless Group and Tennis Australia.
- Rebecca J McGrath - Independent Voting director, chairman of Oz Minerals and Scania Australia, non-executive director of Goodman Group, Investa Office Management Holdings and Investa Wholesale Funds Management.
- Mike Roche - Independent Voting director, member of the ADARA Partners Corporate Advisory Wise Counsel Panel, a small business mentor for Many Rivers Microfinance Limited and co-founder and director of the Sally Foundation.
- Michael J Hawker - Independent Voting director; a director of Aviva, lead independent director of Soul Patts and former CEO of Insurance Australia Group.
- Nicola M Wakefield-Evans - Independent Voting director; a director of Lendlease, Toll Holdings and Bupa Australia and New Zealand Group.

== Notable former employees ==
- Bob Carr
- David Clarke
- Simon Hannes
- John Hewson
- Catherine Livingstone
- Allan Moss
- Eddie Ng
- John Niland
- Helen Nugent
- Graeme Samuel
- Warwick Smith
- Alan Stockdale
