= Amiando =

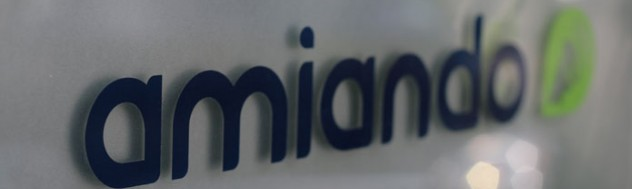
- Company type: Corporation
- Industry: Event management, online registration, ticketing
- Founded: Munich, Germany (2006)
- Founder: Felix Haas, Dennis von Ferenczy, Sebastian Bärhold, Armin Bauer, Marc P. Bernegger, Markus Eichinger
- Headquarters: Munich, Germany
- Key people: Felix Haas (Chief Executive Officer); Dennis von Ferenczy (Chief Marketing Officer); Sebastian Bärhold (Chief Finance Officer); Armin Bauer (Chief Technical Officer); Marc P. Bernegger (Chief Customer Officer)
- Website: www.xing-events.com

Amiando was a startup company for online event management, headquartered in Munich, Germany. Amiando was founded by Felix Haas, Dennis von Ferenczy, Sebastian Bärhold, Armin Bauer, Marc P. Bernegger and Markus Eichinger in Munich in 2006.

The company targeted two main segments of events: Business events (conferences, seminars, corporate events and networking events) and entertainment events (concerts, sports tournaments and parties). Clients were both event organizers as well as event agencies.

== Overview ==
All services are available in English, Spanish, German and French. In July 2012, amiando had 75 employees. amiando has been awarded prizes for its innovative products, among them the “Technology Pioneer of 2010” at the World Economic Forum, and the “eco Internet Award” as the best business client portal.

Since January 2011 amiando has been part of XING SE, an operator of the business network XING. Its headquarters are in Munich; additional offices are located in London, Paris and Hong Kong.

== History ==
=== 2006 ===
In July, the idea of an online platform for guest list management and payment management is developed. The activator is a big party during the Soccer World Cup 2006, which took place in Germany. In August, the first prototype of the platform is created, amiando is still limited to private invitations and the first temporary company holding is incorporated in Munich. In October, the founders attract seed funding from renowned business angels like Lukasz Gadowski, Rodrigo Sepulveda Schulz and Stefan Glaenzer. In December, amiando 1.0 launches.

=== 2007 ===
In January, first prototypes for ticketing are created. One month later, Wellington Partners Venture Capital joins the amiando family. Next Conference in Hamburg becomes the first professional customer of amiando. In April, amiando moves into its first real office in Munich. In May, the sixth co-founder, Marc P. Bernegger, joins the team full-time. One month later, amiando 2.0 launches officially as the first on-demand event ticketing service in Europe. In September, amiando 3.0 launches and makes amiando international by supporting English, Spanish, French and German. LeWeb3 Conference in Paris becomes the first international customer of amiando. In October, amiando becomes an official launch partner of Google Opensocial and moves the complete IT department to Googleplex in Mountain View for two weeks. Google founder Sergey Brin and Google CEO Eric Schmidt review first amiando Opensocial prototypes.

=== 2008 ===
In January, amiando turns down a first acquisition offer, Techcrunch.com uses amiando for the annual Techcrunch Crunchies event in Silicon Valley. One month later amiando organizes its one-year birthday party. In April the angels return, Wellington Partners and AdInvest join a multi-million Series A financing to support growth of amiando. In June, amiando has grown and moved to the new and current headquarters in Munich. In July, amiando 4.0 launches with ViralTickets (the possibility to offer participants a bonus system if they spread an event within their network and thus help selling more tickets for the event). In August, Urs Haeusler, former CEO of Ticketonline Switzerland joins amiando as senior manager. One month later, Facebook founder and CEO Mark Zuckerberg personally visits the amiando office for the European launch of Facebook Connect. In December, amiando 5.0 launches with amiandoEVENTS (fully customizable online registration forms).

=== 2009 ===
In June the World Economic Forum pre-nominates amiando to be a World Economic Forum Technology Pioneer. amiando wins at the Techcrunch Europe awards: Highly Commended as Best Webservice/Application EMEA and finalist as Best Startup Founders. Publicis Live uses amiando for the prestigious Monaco Media Forum.

=== 2010 ===
In August amiando 6.0 launches. amiando comes with a new look and improvements in usability. Further, a new pricing scheme is introduced. the heart of the relaunch is new email tool which is especially tailored to the needs of event organizers.

In December it is announced that amiando will be sold to XING for over €10 million.

=== 2011 ===
In January 2011 amiando is subsumed by its new owner, XING.

=== 2012 ===
In January a second branch office is opened in London, UK.

=== 2023 ===
Xing Events (Amiando) has been closed down.

== See also ==
- Cloud computing
- Business process
- Corporate entertainment
