= Asturix =

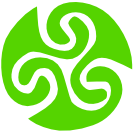

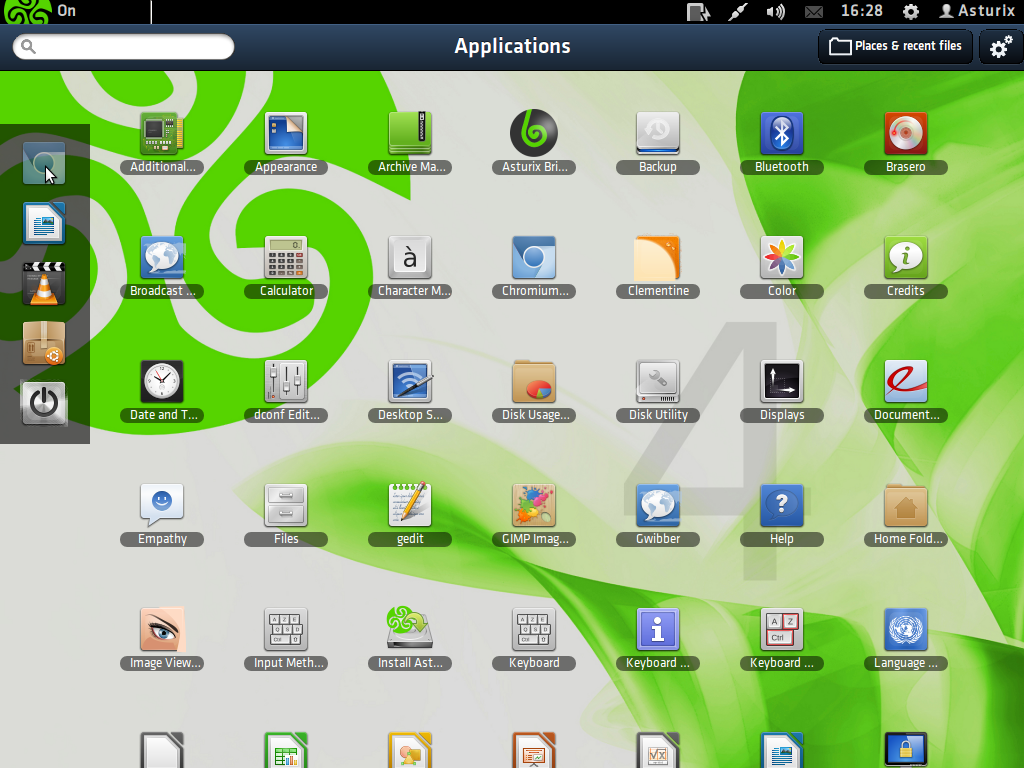
- Developer: Asturix Project
- OS family: Linux (Unix-like)
- Working state: Discontinued
- Source model: Open source
- Initial release: Asturix 1 (February 25, 2009; 17 years ago)
- Latest release: 4 / January 10, 2012; 14 years ago
- Available in: Multi-lan
- Package manager: dkpg
- Kernel type: Monolithic (Linux)
- Default user interface: Asturix On
- Official website: asturix.com

Asturix OS is a discontinued Linux distribution based on Ubuntu. It is no longer maintained.

During its lifespan, this Linux distribution received some media exposure and was reviewed by Jon "maddog" Hall's blog at Linux Magazine and the Asturian newspaper La Nueva España.

Asturix used a triskelion logo, which is also used by an unrelated Linux distribution, Trisquel.

== History ==
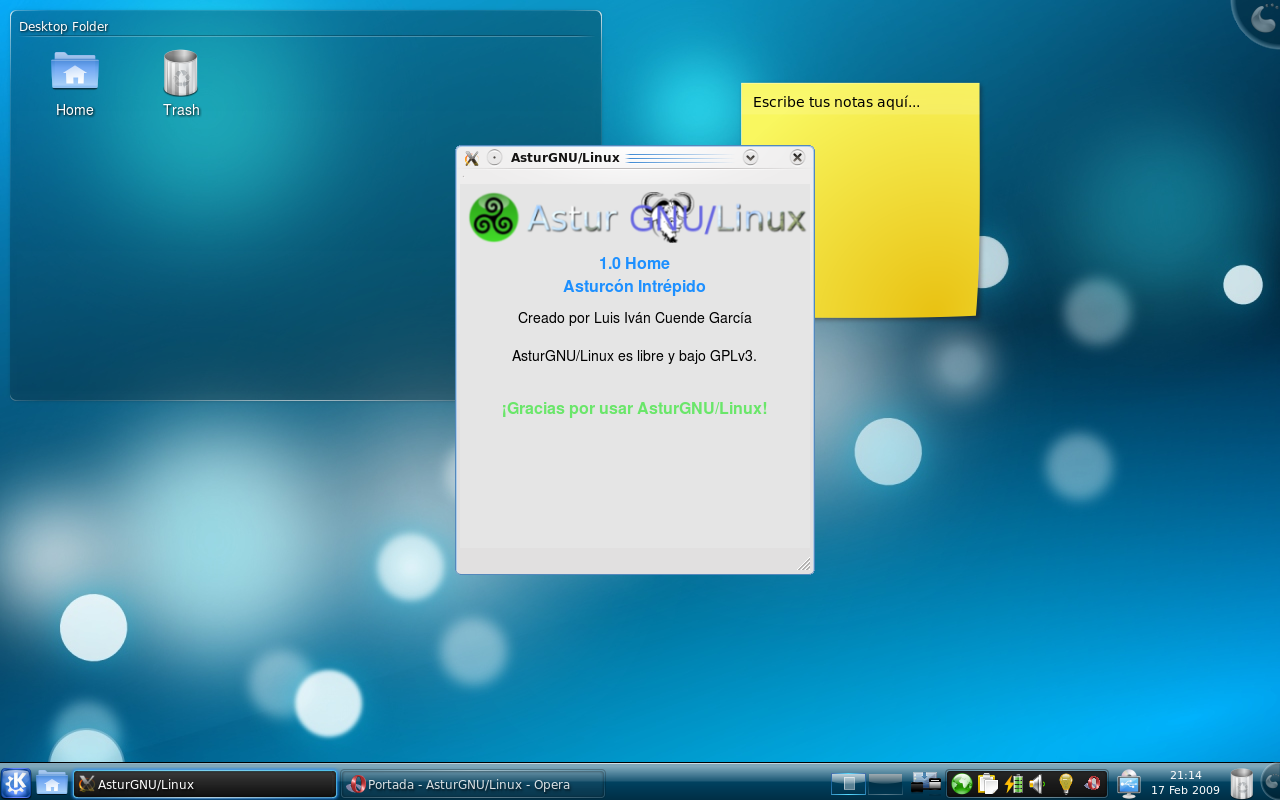
Asturix 1 RC 2

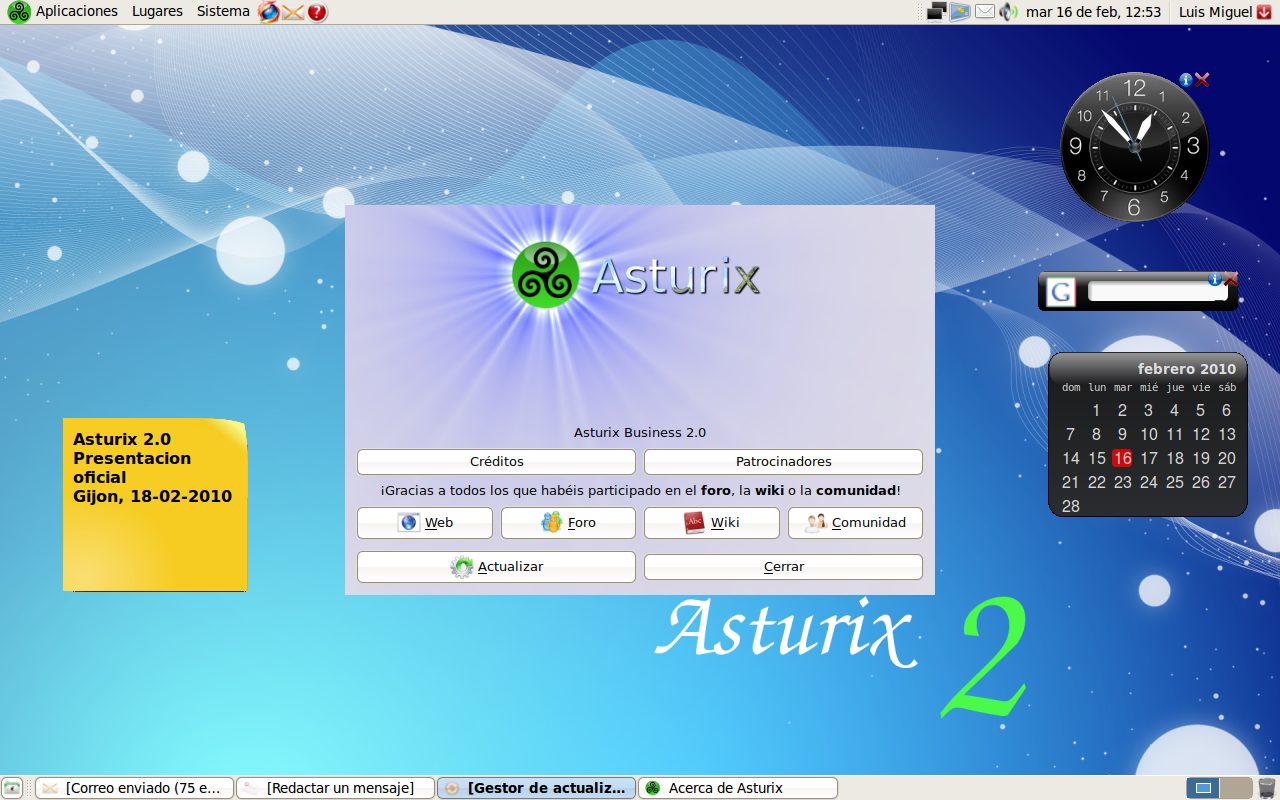
Asturix 2 Business

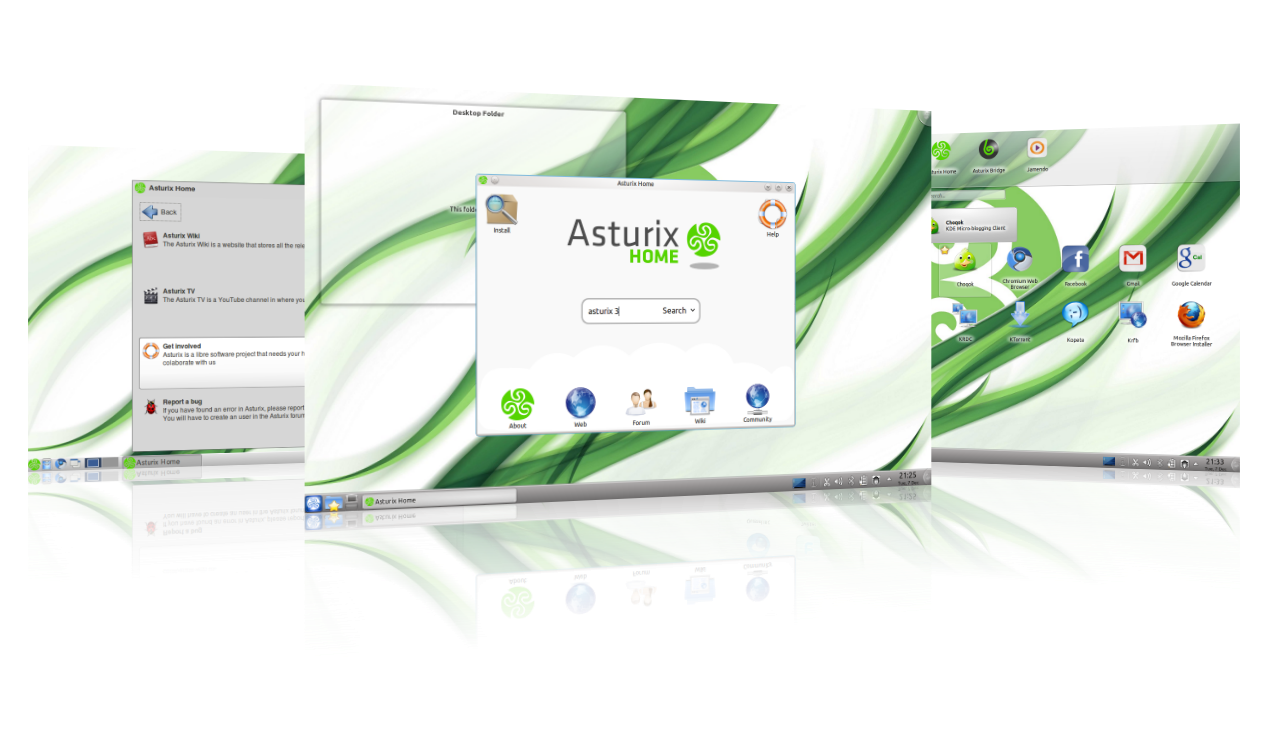
Asturix 3

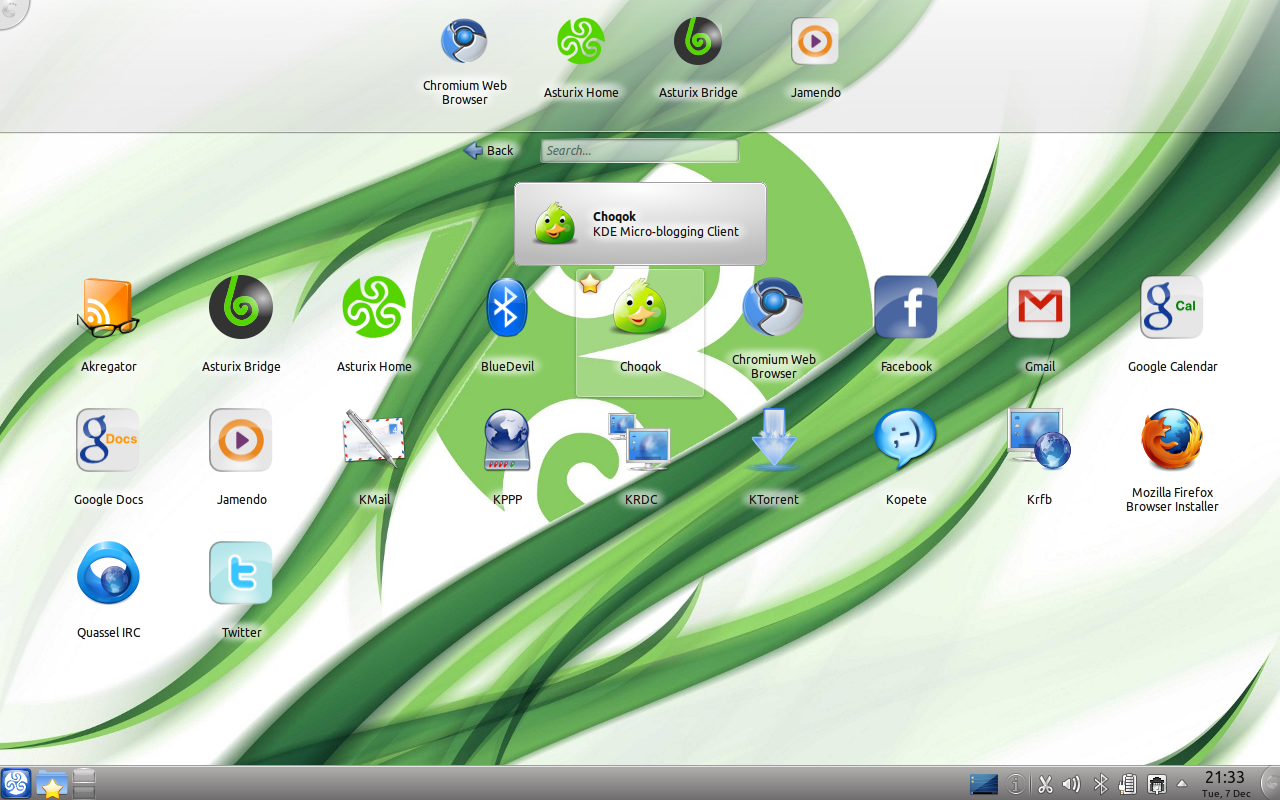
Asturix 3 showing the netbook launcher

In 2008, Asturix was launched as AsturLinux. This name conflicted with an association of Linux users (the Asociación de Usuarios de Linux de Asturias), so the project was renamed Astur GNU/Linux and later Asturix to avoid confusion. By early 2009, Asturix SO started to be developed. Until the third edition of Asturix, there were three versions: Business, Desktop and Lite. On 25 February, Asturix 1 Desktop was released, and one month later, the Business version followed. Asturix was officially presented to the mass media in October, in the Press Club Center of Oviedo. In November there was an Asturix Installation Party in the Spanish Socialist Workers' Party’s local building, the People’s House. That party was covered by a reporter from La Nueva España. Asturix 1 was very similar to Ubuntu, and, consequently, it was criticized for being an “unnecessary fork”.

Asturix 2 was released in early 2010. The launch was covered by the regional public television, RTPA and La Nueva España. A national radio broadcaster, Onda Cero, and a regional branch of Televisión Española, covered the story too. In April, DistroWatch included Asturix in its list of distributions and reviewed it.

In April 2010, Asturix was a finalist for the Campus Party Europa Innovation Prize, an event which was covered by the regional branch of Cadena Ser. Asturix 2 attracted attention from the Spanish Linux specialty media, including Linux +, Revista Linux and Todo Linux. At the same time there were groups of reviewers that claimed Asturix was only a "remastersys copy" of Ubuntu, and that it didn't justify media coverage.

The third edition of Asturix was released in December 2010. There were only two versions instead of three: the main version (named SO) and the lightweight version (called Lite). The main improvements were the addition of face recognition to log in, the use of web apps (using Asturix Bridge) and Asturix's own apps, and some SO modifications. DistroWatch wrote a brief review about it. At this time, Asturix was presented in Madrid and Langreo (Asturias). In 2011, Asturix set up an official voluntary association, which was unveiled later and covered by La Nueva España. In July, Asturix took part in the Campus Party Spain. Jon "maddog" Hall was interested in the project and a month later he wrote about it in his monthly column of Linux Magazine. He gave Asturix the last ten minutes of his lecture, in which Luis Iván Cuende García (Asturix creator) presented Asturix On, a web-based desktop environment.

Luis Iván Cuende won the Hack Now contest (in the under-18 category), an award for the best app or "hack" sponsored by HackFwd, for the development of Asturix On, a desktop environment based on web technologies, which was implemented in Asturix 4. 20 minutos, a Spanish free newspaper, interviewed Iván Cuende about this prize some days later and RTPA did the same. In November 2011, Asturix organized its first event, Youth and Free Culture with Open Source Software, sponsored by CENATIC (a governmental organization) which was covered by La Nueva España and announced at the page of Creative Commons Spain.

In January 2012, the final version of Asturix was released. It featured Asturix On and retained Asturix's own apps as found in the previous edition. Due to the addition of Asturix On, DistroWatch undertook another review and the editor, Jesse Smith, described it as a "mixed bag". It was reviewed by some blogs, including one English-speaking, Hectic Geek, though most were Spanish blogs, like Genbeta. Asturix was also featured on Televisión Española twice in this period. Since then, no further development was made.
