= Bernegger =

Bernegger is a surname. Notable people with the surname include:

- Carlos Bernegger (born 1969), Argentine-Swiss footballer
- Marc P. Bernegger (born 1979), Swiss entrepreneur and investor
- Matthias Bernegger (1582–1640), German philologist, astronomer, and writer
- Nicole Bernegger (born 1977), Swiss soul singer
