= Waddell & Reed =

American asset management and financial planning company

Waddell & Reed Financial, Inc.
- Type: Subsidiary
- Industry: Asset Management; Financial Planning
- Founded: 1937; 89 years ago
- Defunct: 2021
- Fate: Acquired
- Successor: Delaware Funds
- Headquarters: Kansas City, Missouri, U.S.
- Brands: Ivy Investments
- AUM: US$48 Billion (5th May 2021)
- Owner: Macquarie Asset Management
- Website: www.macquarieim.com

Waddell & Reed Financial, Inc. was an American asset management and financial planning company founded in 1937 in Kansas City, Missouri. It was a publicly traded company from 1998 to 2021, and briefly had its headquarters in Overland Park, Kansas, and was planning a move back to Downtown Kansas City before the company was sold. It operated asset management and distribution subsidiaries, including Ivy Investment Management Company and Waddell & Reed Investment Management Company.

The company distributed products through three primary channels:

- Advisors channel (a network of personal financial advisors around the country);
- Wholesale channel (unaffiliated broker/dealers, registered investment advisors and retirement platforms); and the
- Institutional channel (pension plans, defined benefit plans and endowments).

== History ==
The company traces its history to September 3, 1937, when it was founded by Chauncey Waddell and Cameron Reed. The company was one of the first to sell funds following the Investment Company Act of 1940. Two of its funds—United Income Fund and United Accumulative Fund—were among the first mutual funds in the United States. Its first offices were in department stores.

Continental Investment Corporation of Boston bought Waddell & Reed for $82.5 million in 1969. Liberty National Insurance Holding Company, later renamed Torchmark Corporation acquired it for $160 million in 1981. Torchmark spun it off in 1998 in a deal where for 10 Torchmark shares held, Torchmark shareholders received 3 shares of Waddell & Reed.

In 2010, the company was put in the spotlight due to their being a factor in the 2010 "Flash Crash", according to a report by the Securities and Exchange Commission and the United States Commodity Futures Trading Commission. Reportedly, a bug in Waddell & Reed's compute algorithm, coupled with significant competing high frequency traders, triggered a massive crash in the price of S&P500 E-mini futures. Later analysis from the Chicago Mercantile Exchange said the SEC/CFTC report was disingenuous to place too much blame on Waddell & Reed as the company's represented only 1.3% of the total relevant trades for the entire day, and some 9% of trades for the narrower period of time associated with the crash.

In 2013, the company acquired the photo-agency Trunk Archive, which had been co-founded by Mickey Beyer Clausen and Matthew Moneypenny. Along with Trunk Archive, the company had acquired 11 other licensing and assignment agencies to create the Great Bowery,

In February 2016, Waddell & Reed announced the purchase of at least 8.2% of the Spanish company Abengoa, which was in serious financial trouble.

In 2021, Waddell & Reed was purchased by Macquaire Asset Management, a division of Macquarie Group, becoming a wholly owned subsidiary in the process. Macquarie then sold Waddell & Reed's wealth management business to LPL Financial in April 2021 and merged the asset management business, Ivy Managements, into Delaware Funds.
