= Stan Owens =

Australian businessman

Ernest Stanley Owens OBE
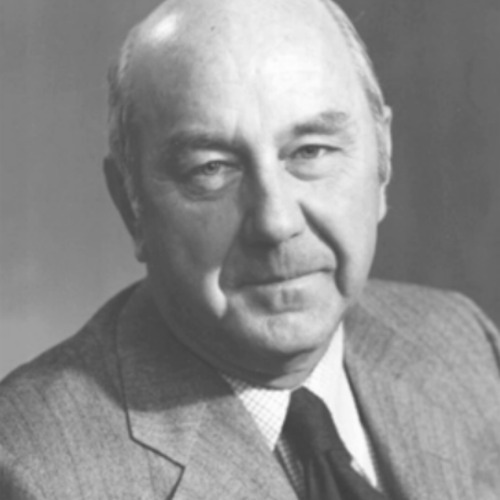
- Ernest Stanley Owens
- Born: September 22, 1916; Armidale, New South Wales, Australia
- Died: June 3, 1983 (aged 66)
- Occupation: Businessman
- Known for: Founding Chairman of Hill Samuel Australia; Chairman of AUSSAT; Chairman of Rolls-Royce Australia
- Awards: Officer of the Order of the British Empire (1970)

Ernest Stanley Owens OBE (22 September 1916 – 3 June 1983) was an Australian businessman born in Armidale, New South Wales, Australia. He was made an Officer of the Order of the British Empire in 1970.

He was a member of the Australian Institute of Management, and served on Sydney City Council from 1969 to 1974. He also served as president of the Civic Reform Association.

Amongst his appointments, he was Founding Chairman of Hill Samuel Australia (which is now known as Macquarie Group) and AUSSAT Pty Ltd (which after privatisation became known as Optus) and Chairman of Rolls-Royce Australia.
