= Kreditech =

German online lender

Kreditech Holding SSL GmbH
- Type: Limited liability company (Gesellschaft mit beschränkter Haftung)
- Industry: Financial Services
- Founded: 2012
- Headquarters: Hamburg, Germany
- Key people: David Chan (CEO)
- Products: Online financial products (primarily loans)
- Number of employees: 300
- Website: http://www.kreditech.com/

Kreditech (a trading name of Kreditech Holding SSL GmbH) was a German online lender which offered loans to individuals based on their creditworthiness which is analyzed using their online data instead of using traditional credit rating information. The company filed for bankruptcy due to the obstacles presented by the COVID-19 pandemic. Founded in 2012 by Sebastian Diemer and Alexander Graubner-Müller, Kreditech is headquartered in Hamburg, Germany; it particularly focuses its efforts on emerging markets.

== Technology ==
Kreditech used a self-learning algorithm which analyzes big data. It calculated an individual's credit score in seconds using up to 20,000 data points. Kreditech uses location-based information (GPS), social networking information (likes, friends, locations and posts), hardware data (operating system, browser, etc.), online shopping behavior and general online behavior in order to determine a loan applicant's creditworthiness.

== Operations ==
Kreditech operated in Poland, Spain, Russia, Romania, and India. The company currently employs 500 people, with the headquarters in Hamburg, Germany. Kreditech currently runs its operations via multiple online lending platforms such as Kredito24.

== Funding ==
In 2014 Kreditech closed a US$40 million Series B round. Värde Partners led the deal together with current shareholder Blumberg Capital. Point Nine Capital and other shareholders also participated in the round. This funding round was the largest ever for a German financial services tech firm, and is one of the largest rounds in Germany in 2014. From 2012 to 2014, Kreditech raised a total of $65M. In January 2015 the company raised a further $200M in credit line from Victory Park Capital. The company will use the newly obtained funds to further develop its existing product portfolio and expand its operations to new markets. In April 2015 Kreditech was included in Forbes Magazine's list "The Next Billion-Dollar Startups", effectively being the only German company to make the list.

In September 2015, Kreditech raised EUR€82.5 million in a Series C financing round led by J.C. Flowers & Co. Following this, in 2016, Kreditech further augmented its funding with an additional €10 million from the International Finance Corporation (IFC), a member of the World Bank Group, bringing the total Series C financing round to €92.7 million.

== Acquisitions ==
On January 14, 2015, Kreditech has acquired 100% of Kontomierz.pl Sp. z o. o. (Kontomierz) for a seven digit amount plus Kreditech shares. Kontomierz makes software named Kontomatik to verify client identity (KYC) and gain read-only access to bank accounts. Kreditech stated it will support the expansion of Kontomierz in global markets such as Brazil, Mexico, Russia and Spain.

== Criticism ==
Kreditech Holding SSL GmbH started in February 2012 as kredito OFS GmbH and launched its first platform kredito.de in March 2012. Kredito.de offered short-term micro loans to customers of up to €400. After launch of the service, Kredito.de was criticized heavily for trying to circumvent German legislation against usury as customers had to pay for a mandatory "credit-worthiness certificate" which cost €49.90, was valid for 30 days and whose cost was not reflected by the displayed effective interest rate. By German law an effective interest has to be communicated to a customer, all fees associated with a loan have to be included in the effective interest and the effective interest rate must not be substantially above market interest rates. Kredito.de was accused of usury by a spokesperson from the "Hamburger Verbraucherzentrale", a German institute for consumer protection, who called the service "dubious". After a couple of months Kredito.de closed its German platform. The now defunct platform Kredito.de was rebranded and restarted as Kreditech in late 2012. The company no longer offers loans in Germany, and has since eliminated the mandatory purchase of the controversial "credit-worthiness certificates" in all of their markets. While not offering short-term loans in Germany any longer, Kreditech is still criticised for offering short-term loans with effective yearly interest rates of several thousand percent. In Poland, for example, a customer is charged fees equal to an interest rate of 3305% for a 30-day loan with a face value of 502 zlotys. In Mexico a customer is charged fees equivalent to an effective interest rate of 6231% for a 7-day loan with a face value of 1000 Mexican Peso.

== Customer Data Leak ==
The company had a leak of applicant data in November 2014 which the Hamburg police are investigating. The information was leaked from within by someone who worked at the company, according to the Kreditech spokesperson.
