= Delaware Investments =

US asset management subsidiary

Delaware Funds
- Formerly: Delaware Investments
- Company type: Subsidiary
- Industry: Financial services
- Founded: 1929 (97 years ago)
- Founder: Admiral W. Linton Nelson
- Headquarters: Philadelphia, Pennsylvania, United States
- Key people: Shawn Lytle (President); Brett Lewthwaite (Head of Fixed Income)
- Products: Mutual funds; Institutional investments
- Number of employees: ~ 500 (2021)
- Parent: Macquarie Asset Management
- Website: www.delawarefunds.com

Macquarie Investment Management (previously Delaware Investments) is a US-based asset management firm providing mutual funds and Institutional investments that is a wholly owned subsidiary of Macquarie Group, an Australian investment bank.

In April 2017, Delaware Investments was rebranded as Macquarie Investment Management, effectively ending the original entity. The US funds continue to be managed under the "Delaware Funds by Macquarie" brand.

In 2020, Macquarie Investment Management began acquisition of Overland Park, Kansas based asset manager Waddell and Reed (Ivy Funds).

== History ==
Delaware Investments commenced business in 1929 and introduced its first mutual fund in 1938.

In 1972 it introduced institutional separate account management and in 1974 it established its Taft-Hartley business. In 1990 it established its International/Global capabilities. In 2000, Delaware Investments enhanced its fixed income capabilities and in 2007 it launched Delaware Investments Global Funds plc.

Macquarie Group acquired Delaware Investments, previously a division of Lincoln Financial, in 2010 for a reported $452 million cash deal. In 2017, the company became Macquarie Investment Management, a business unit of the Macquarie Group.
