= Marc P. Bernegger =

Swiss entrepreneur

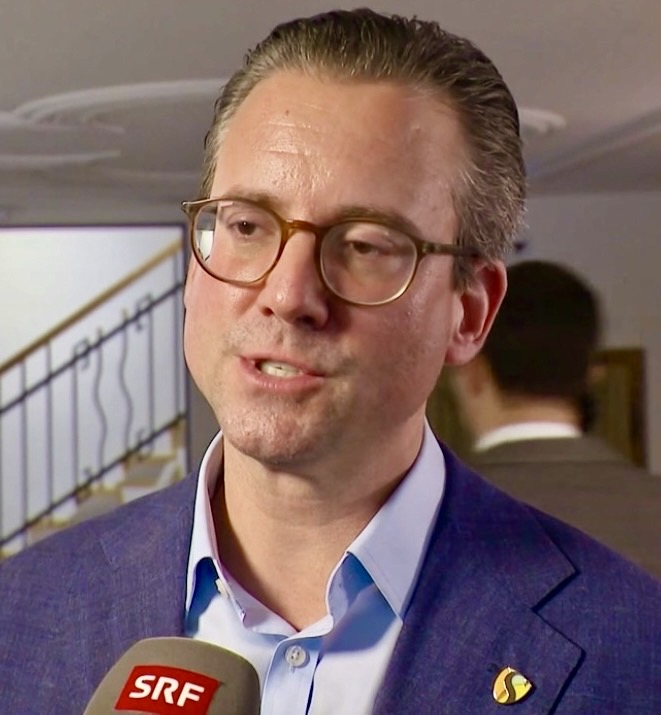
- Bernegger in 2026
- Born: 1979 (age 46–47); Zurich, Switzerland
- Education: University of Zurich Singularity University
- Occupations: Entrepreneur and Investor
- Known for: Longevity, FinTech, Bitcoin, Entrepreneurship
- Website: bernegger.com

Marc P. Bernegger is a Swiss serial entrepreneur and tech investor. He is known for co-founding usgang.ch, Amiando and Crypto Finance Group. He has also involved in entrepreneurship, future tech, FinTech and cryptocurrency in Switzerland.

Bernegger has invested in several startups and has served for board of organizations including Swiss Blockchain Federation, GenTwo, Maximon, Longevity Investors and Falcon private bank. He established his own investment firm, Bernegger Ventures, in 2007.

== Early life and education ==
Bernegger was born in Zurich in 1979 and raised in Switzerland. He holds a Master of Law degree from University of Zurich and also graduated from Singularity University in Silicon Valley.

== Career ==
In 1999, Bernegger founded usgang.ch, an online party platform that was later acquired by Axel Springer Media in 2008. He worked as a lawyer for one year. In 2006, he co-founded Amiando, an online platform for event registration and ticketing acquired by Xing in 2010. He joined the board of Pioneer’s Club PCU. In 2007, he established Bernegger Ventures, an investment firm focused on startups.

In 2013, Bernegger co-founded Finance 2.0, regarded as Switzerland’s first FinTech conference. He became a board member of Greater Zurich Area in 2014 and joined FinLeap in 2015 as senior advisor and Ambassador of Switzerland. In 2017, he joined the boards of Falcon Private Bank, CfC St. Moritz, and Crypto Finance AG. He became a founding board member of the Swiss Blockchain Federation in 2018 and joined the World Economic Forum expert Network for blockchain and digital economy in 2020. In 2021, he co-founded the venture builder Maximon, a Swiss-based longevity company.

In 2020, Bernegger founded Crypto Fund.News, which was acquired by Crypto Funds Watch in 2025. In 2017, he founded Crypto Finance Group, which was also acquired by Deutsche Börse in 2021. In 2021, he co‑founded Maximon, a company builder focused on longevity, and Longevity Investors, a network for investors in longevity. In 2012, he became an early participant in Bitcoin and was a founding shareholder and board member of Crypto Finance Group, which was acquired by Deutsche Börse in 2021.

== Awards and honors ==
- Swiss FinTech Awards – Influencer of the Year (2025): Bernegger was recognized for his contributions to fintech and entrepreneurship in Switzerland
- In 2020, Bernegger was recognized as one of the Top 8 Swiss Fintech “Bankers” in the Bilanz Ranking
- 30 most important digital heads in Switzerland by Handelszeitung
- 100 most successful people under 40 in Switzerland by Bilanz
- Newcomer of the Year 2010 by Swiss ICT
- 100 most influential technology investors in Europe by Telegraph
- World Economic Forum Recognition (2009): Amiando, the event platform he co-founded, was named a Global Technology Pioneer by the World Economic Forum.

== See also ==
- Amiando
- XING
- Axel Springer SE
