= Mickey Beyer Clausen =

Danish-born, entrepreneur and philanthropist (born 1975)

Mickey Beyer-Clausen
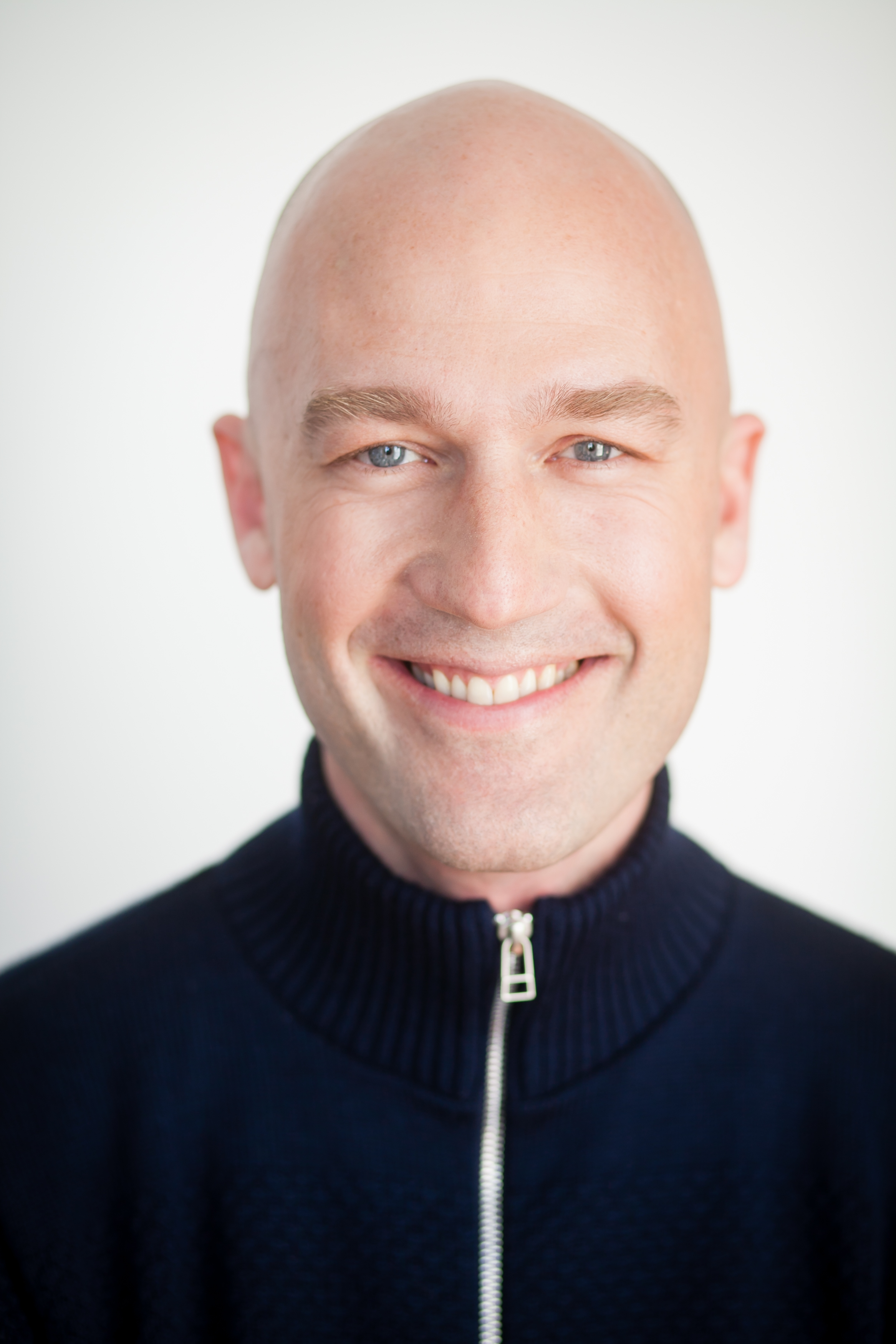
- Born: 3 April 1975; Copenhagen, Denmark
- Occupation: Entrepreneur
- Spouse: Allison Beyer-Clausen
- Children: 2
- Parent(s): Benny Kjær Sørensen and Jette Beyer-Clausen

Mickey Beyer-Clausen (born April 3, 1975 in Copenhagen) is a Danish-born entrepreneur and philanthropist, who is currently based in Southampton.

== Personal life ==
Mickey Beyer-Clausen was born in Copenhagen, Denmark in 1975. His mother was a flight attendant.

In 2006, Beyer-Clausen moved to New York City and met his now wife Allison Belmore (now Beyer-Clausen). Today, Allison runs a bakery in Southhampton, where their two children Anna and Oliver attend school.

== Business activities ==
=== Speednames and Ascio Technologies ===
In 1999, Beyer-Clausen co-founded Speednames..In 2001, he founded Ascio Technologies. In January 2007, both companies were acquired by London AIM-listed Group NBT for $36 million.

=== Trunk Archive and Mental Workout ===
In 2004, Beyer-Clausen co-founded Trunk Archive, a photo-licensing agency with Matthew Moneypenny. Which In 2013, was acquired by Waddell & Reed and Ivy Asset Strategy Funds. In 2009, he co-founded Mental Workout.

=== Timeshifter app ===
In 2017, Beyer-Clausen co-founded the Timeshifter app with Harvard Medical School scientist Dr. Steven Lockley. The app helps travelers regulate their jet lag. Many athletes use the app. During the 2026 FIFA World Cup, Nike- sponsored athletes had the opportunity to use the app. Athletes at the 2028 Summer Olympics are also expected to use the app.

== The Happiness Foundation ==
In 2002, Beyer-Clausen founded the Happiness Foundation as an alternative to typical philanthropic organizations. The foundation offers nonprofit organizations pro bono consultancy. The foundation was co-financed by the Danish-government. Beyer-Clausen is the chairman of Happiness Foundation.
