= Frank Thelen =

German businessman

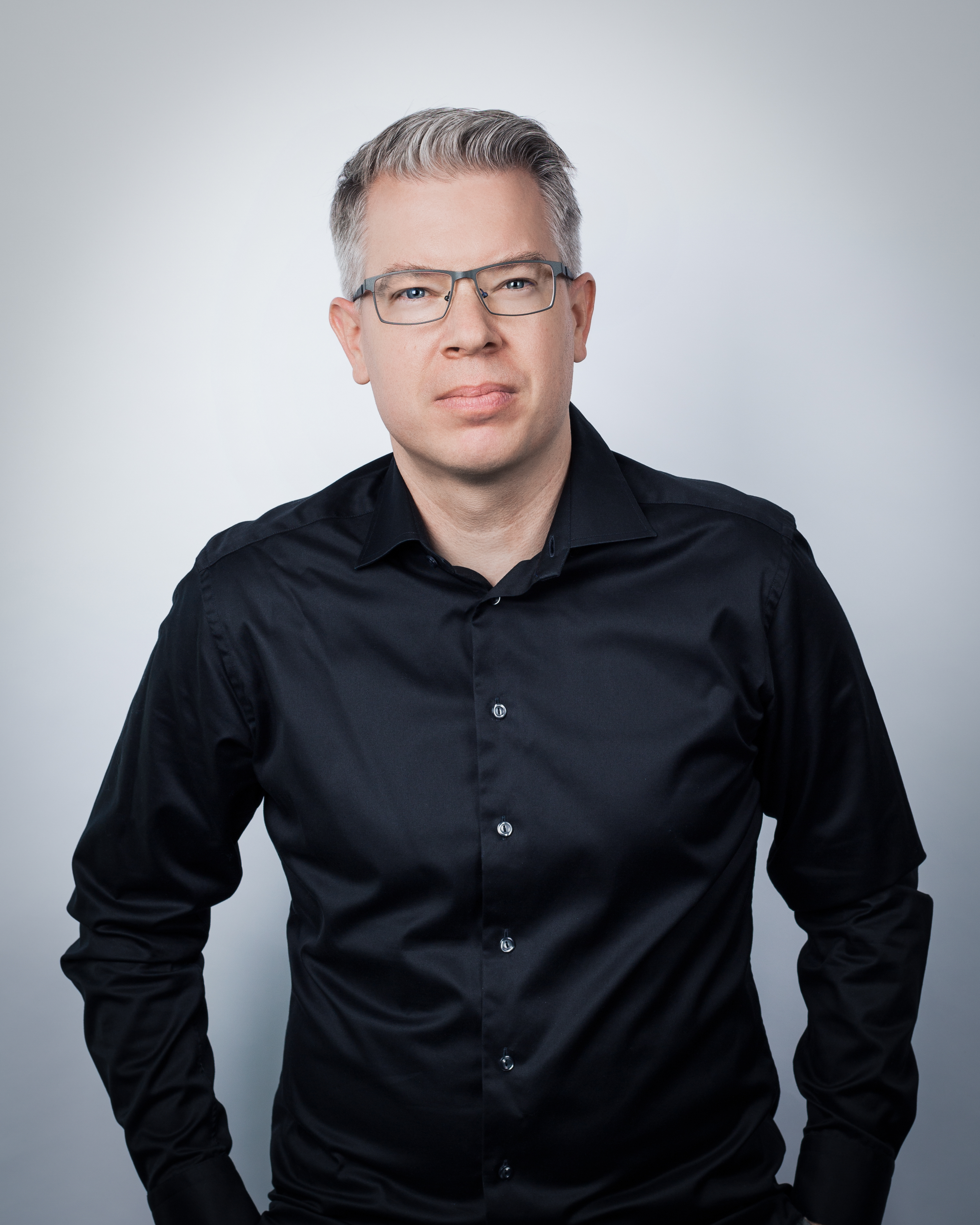
- Thelen in 2020
- Born: 10 October 1975 (age 50); Bonn, West Germany
- Occupations: Investor, businessman, author
- Television: Die Höhle der Löwen
- Website: frank.io

Frank Thelen (born 10 October 1975) is a German businessman, investor and author based in Bonn. He is best known as an investor in the TV series Die Höhle der Löwen, the German version of Shark Tank.

== Early life ==
Frank Thelen first attended the Pädagogium Bad Godesberg and then the Carl-Schurz-Realschule in Bonn.

Before turning to software engineering, Thelen's youth was primarily dominated by skateboarding and snowboarding. He still supports projects in this field today, such as "Skate-Aid" by Titus Dittman. Thelen later began studying computer science at the Bonn/Rhein-Sieg University of Applied Sciences, but dropped out to build his first company.

== Career ==
=== Early ventures (1994–2011) ===
According to his own autobiography, Thelen founded his first company, Softer Solutions Media, in 1994. The company developed a platform for the production of multimedia CD-ROMs and merged with another company in 1996, resulting in Twisd AG, for which Thelen received 1.4 million DM in venture capital in 1997. The company developed and sold a Linux-based router that connected local networks to the Internet and enabled management via a web application. In 1999, the company prepared for an IPO, but then had to file for bankruptcy in the wake of the bursting of the dot-com bubble.

Thelen went on to co-found ip.labs, an online photo service founded in 2004 that was acquired by the Fujifilm Group in 2008 for an estimated 13–19 million euros. After leaving ip.labs, he founded Doo GmbH in 2011, developing a central document management app, which drew more than ten million US dollars from investors including Lars Hinrichs and DuMont Venture. After the original approach failed, the app was relaunched in 2014 as the scanner app Scanbot, and the company renamed itself accordingly. Scanbot later pivoted to selling its software to businesses and was sold to the American company Maple Media in 2020, becoming Scanbot SDK. In July 2025, Scanbot SDK was acquired by the American technology company Apryse.

=== Venture capital and startup investments ===
From 2014, Thelen led venture capital firm e42, later renamed Freigeist Capital, which has invested in startups including Wunderlist, MyTaxi, KaufDa, pitch, Lilium, Hardt Hyperloop and Endurosat.

Among his best-known consumer investments is yfood, a Munich-based maker of ready-to-drink meal-replacement products founded in 2017 by Benjamin Kremer and Noel Bollmann. Thelen invested 200,000 euros in the company in 2018 after the founders pitched on Die Höhle der Löwen, helping raise the brand's national profile. Food group Nestlé acquired a minority stake of around 49 percent in yfood in 2023 to support its international expansion. In June 2026, Nestlé agreed to acquire the remaining shares from founders Kremer and Bollmann for a reported 220 million euros, taking full ownership of the company effective 3 July 2026; the founders left operational roles at that point, with day-to-day leadership passing to Nestlé manager Jolanda Schwirtz, while yfood's headquarters remained in Munich. By 2025 yfood had grown to roughly 150 million euros in annual revenue and distribution in some 30 countries.

Thelen has advised the Microsoft Ventures accelerator in Berlin, and has supported startups in German politics. In 2012, Thelen spoke at the Founders Conference in New York and received the "Innovate 4 Society Award" from Microsoft, presented by German Chancellor Angela Merkel for his startup "doo".

=== Television: Die Höhle der Löwen ===
Thelen joined the first season of Die Höhle der Löwen, the German version of Dragons' Den (Shark Tank), as an investor in 2014, and remained on the panel for its first seven seasons. In November 2019 he announced he would leave after the 2020 season to focus on his technology investments. He made a one-off return as a guest investor for the show's tenth-anniversary episode on 23 September 2024, appearing alongside former panellist Jochen Schweizer. In November 2024 it was announced he would rejoin as a regular investor, which he did from the autumn 2025 season, first broadcast on 25 August 2025. Thelen is also a frequent guest on German talk shows, including Markus Lanz, Maischberger and Hart aber fair.

=== Author ===
In 2018, Thelen published his autobiography Startup-DNA – Hinfallen, aufstehen, die Welt verändern, a bestseller for several weeks. The same year, he became the first investor in Xentral.

His second book, 10xDNA: Das Mindset der Zukunft, was published on 18 May 2020. It discusses developments in artificial intelligence and quantum computing, arguing that Germany and Europe need a "10x mindset" to keep pace with the United States and China, and reached number four on the Spiegel bestseller list within two weeks of release. An English-language edition, 10xDNA: Mindset for a Thriving Future, followed on 24 November 2020, and an updated German paperback edition was published by Goldmann on 18 October 2021.

=== Investment funds (2021–present) ===
In 2021, Thelen founded the Bonn-based fund company 10xDNA Capital Partners, which manages publicly available equity funds for retail and institutional investors. Its first fund, 10xDNA Disruptive Technologies, launched in September 2021, followed by Small & Mid Cap Technologies (February 2023) and Clean Technologies (March 2024); the funds invest in publicly traded technology companies and aim to provide investors with diversified exposure to the technology sector, with a focus on smaller companies outside of "Big Tech". In July 2024 the company was renamed TEQ Capital, a contraction of "Technology Equity", and Mike Judith joined as chief sales officer.

After a difficult start, performance across the fund family improved substantially from 2023 onward. By December 2024, Disruptive Technologies was up 39 percent year-to-date. By mid-2026, it had gained roughly 37 percent over the preceding twelve months and moved back above its original September 2021 issue price for the first time. The Small & Mid Cap Technologies and Clean Technologies funds likewise turned solidly positive after early losses, each showing double-digit gains since inception by the second quarter of 2026.

In January 2026, TEQ Capital launched its first exchange-traded fund, the TEQ – General Artificial Intelligence UCITS ETF (ISIN: LU3098954871), tracking a rules-based index developed with the Cologne-based firm NaroIQ that had already returned 30.2 percent in its first year of operation; Thelen personally seeded the product with one million euros.

Separately from his equity products, Thelen co-launched a European fixed-income vehicle, the Tell's Arrow Opportunities Bond Fund, in December 2023 together with the Geneva-based fixed-income specialist Genève Invest, serving as lead investor and strategic partner alongside fund manager Helge Müller. Concentrated in convertible and deep-value corporate bonds, the fund returned 11.1 percent in 2024 and had gained roughly 32 percent cumulatively since its December 2023 launch by the end of 2025, a track record German financial outlet FTD described as notable for a young fund, citing an unusually high Sharpe ratio of 2.

== Political activity ==
Thelen was a member of the Christian Democratic Union (CDU) until April 2017. On 12 February 2017 he was a delegate to the Federal Convention that elected Frank-Walter Steinmeier as federal president in the 2017 German presidential election, sitting for the Free Democratic Party (FDP) on the nomination of the Landtag of North Rhine-Westphalia. In June 2021 he was one of ten German start-up entrepreneurs who jointly donated €500,000 to the FDP, publicly advocating a governing coalition of the CDU/CSU and the FDP. Ahead of the 2025 German federal election he publicly endorsed both the CDU and the FDP.

From 2018 to 2021, Thelen co-led the German federal government's Innovation Council on digitalisation together with Dorothee Bär, then Minister of State for Digital Affairs; the advisory body met twice a year until the end of the legislative period. He is an advocate of some form of universal basic income and has argued that Europe risks falling behind the United States and China unless it creates better conditions for new technologies so that more large start-ups can emerge on the continent.

In early 2025, Thelen published an open letter addressed to Elon Musk, who had voiced support for the far-right Alternative for Germany (AfD). While expressing admiration for Musk as an entrepreneur, Thelen rejected the AfD, describing it as espousing right-wing extremist nationalism, but added that he shared the view that Germany should reduce bureaucracy, move away from what he called "woke" ideologies and adopt a different immigration policy. In a December 2025 debate over whether the business association Die Familienunternehmer should hold talks with the AfD, Thelen criticised companies that had left the group and argued that the political Brandmauer ("firewall") against the AfD had failed given the parties' standing in the polls; he called for bolder policymaking and "new faces" such as Javier Milei.

== Awards ==
In 2012, Thelen received the "Innovate 4 Society Award" from Microsoft for the startup "doo". The award was presented by Angela Merkel.

== Personal life ==
Thelen lives in Bonn and is married to orthodontist Nathalie Thelen-Sattler.

== Publications ==
- Die Autobiografie: Startup-DNA – Hinfallen, aufstehen, die Welt verändern. Murmann Publishers. 2018. ISBN 3-86774-611-7.
- Europa kann es besser: Wie unser Kontinent zu neuer Stärke findet. Ein Weckruf der Wirtschaft. Autorenbeitrag. Publisher: Thomas Sigmund & Sven Afhüppe. Herder, Freiburg 2019, ISBN 978-3-451-39360-0.
- 10xDNA: Das Mindset der Zukunft. Frank Thelen Media, ISBN 978-3982176406. English edition: 10xDNA: Mindset for a Thriving Future. Frank Thelen Media, 2020, ISBN 978-3-9821764-2-0.
- Frank Thelen – Mein Leben, Meine Firma, Meine Strategie; Author: Volker ter Haseborg Publisher: Beat Balzli. GABAL Verlag, Offenbach 2022, ISBN 978-3-96739-094-0.
