= 1 Elizabeth =

Skyscraper and Metro Station in Australia

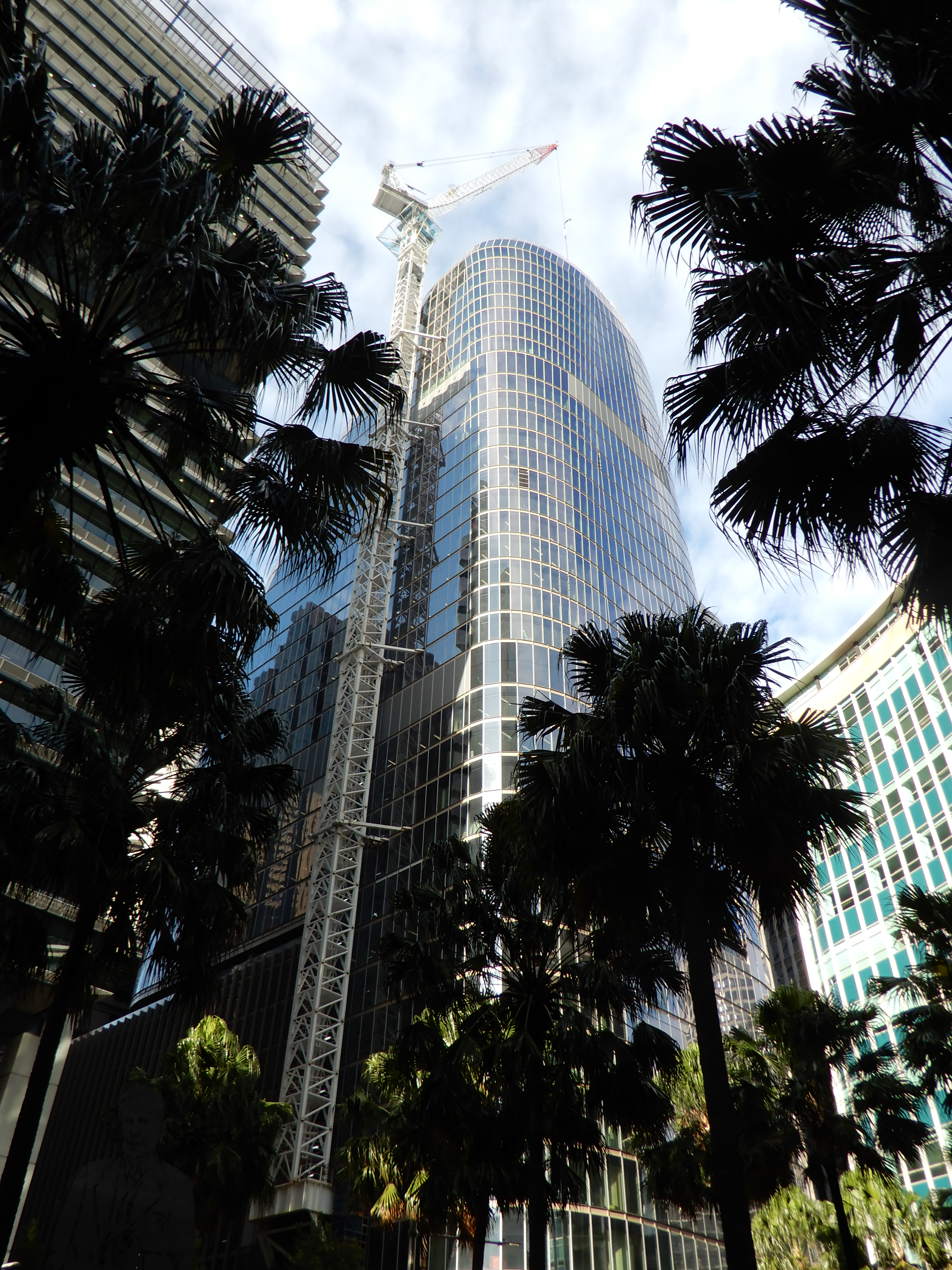
- Alternative names: Martin Place Metro North Tower

General information
- Type: Commercial
- Location: Sydney central business district, 1 Elizabeth Street, Sydney, Australia
- Coordinates: 33.866533°S 151.21033°E
- Current tenants: Macquarie Bank
- Construction started: 2020
- Completed: 2024

Height
- Height: 174 m (571 feet)
- Top floor: 39

Technical details
- Floor count: 40
- Floor area: 75,521 square metres (812,900 sq ft)
- Grounds: 6,022 square metres (64,820 sq ft)

Design and construction
- Architecture firm: Johnson Pilton Walker
- Developer: Macquarie Bank
- Structural engineer: Arup Group
- Other designers: Grimshaw Architects
- Main contractor: Lendlease

Other information
- Public transit: Martin Place

Website
- www.1elizabeth.com.au

1 Elizabeth, also known as Martin Place Metro North Tower, is a 174 m (571 feet) 40–story skyscraper in Sydney, Australia. Designed by Johnson Pilton Walker (JPW), the building has been integrated with the adjoining 50 Martin Place building, as well as the Martin Place station that sits under 1 Elizabeth.

The building occupies the sites of former office buildings on 9-19 Elizabeth Street, 8-12 Castlereagh Street, 55 Hunter Street, and an art deco apartment building on 7 Elizabeth Street which were gazetted for construction of the Sydney Metro.

== History ==
=== Proposal ===
In December 2014, Macquarie Bank learnt of the Sydney Metro's three CBD underground station construction sites and started work on a pitch to the Government of New South Wales for it to design and build the proposed Martin Place station with the intention to build an expansion to its Sydney headquarters on 48-50 Martin Place.

In February 2016, Macquarie Bank lodged an unsolicited proposal to deliver the Sydney Metro Martin Place integrated station development that will comprise the new metro station, retail space, pedestrian connections and the two buildings above the station. In March 2017, the Government of New South Wales rejected the other bid by Dexus and entered into exclusive negotiations with Macquarie Bank.

In 2018, Macquarie Bank announces it entered an agreement with the Government of New South Wales to design and deliver a new integrated station development in Martin Place partnering with contractor Lendlease. The A$3 billion development will add 95,000 square metres (1,020,000 sq ft) of new space into the Sydney market and is planned for completion by 2024. Macquarie paid the Government of New South Wales $355 million for the air rights above the station to build the two office buildings.

=== Construction ===
Construction of the building, designed by the architecture firm Johnson Pilton Walker and built by Lendlease for Macquarie Bank, began in 2020 and are to be completed in 2024. At completion, the building will become Macquarie Group's new global headquarters.

== Sydney Metro Art Program ==
As part of the Sydney Metro legacy-building public art program, three artworks from the former P&O building on 55 Hunter Street were salvaged, stored, refurbished and reinstated as public artworks incorporated into 1 Elizabeth.

Public Art salvaged from previous P&O Building at 55 Hunter Street -

- Four Continents, 1963, Douglas Annand
- P&O Wall Mural, 1963, Douglas Annand
- P&O Wall Fountain, 1962, Tom Bass
