= Shemara Wikramanayake =

Australian businesswoman (born 1962)

- Born: 1962 (age 63–64); England
- Education: Ascham School; Harvard Business School
- Alma mater: University of New South Wales
- Occupations: Managing director non-executive director
- Years active: 1987 - present
- Organization: Macquarie Group
- Known for: First female Group CEO of Macquarie Group
- Spouse: Ed Gilmartin
- Children: 2

Shemara Wikramanayake (born 1962) is an Australian businesswoman. She embarked on a career as a lawyer and then as a banker. In 2018, she became the managing director and CEO of Macquarie Group Ltd. She has advocated to increase renewable energy production and has also called on the governments to quadruple renewable energy production by 2030 with the intention to minimise the global effects of climate change.

Wikramanayake received a total of $A23.7 million in compensation in 2022, making her the highest paid CEO in Australia for the second year in a row.

== Career ==
Wikramanayake worked as a corporate lawyer at Blake Dawson Waldron before joining Macquarie Group Ltd in 1987. She headed Macquarie's corporate advisory office in New Zealand and she was also instrumental in setting up corporate advisory offices in Hong Kong and Malaysia. She worked with Macquarie Capital for nearly 20 years and was appointed as the head of the Macquarie Asset Management in 2008 and headed the asset management arm of the company for more than a decade.

In December 2018, she replaced Nicholas Moore as managing director and CEO of Macquarie Group. Prior to this, Wikramanayake was the group head of Macquarie Asset Management. She also went onto become the first female CEO of Macquarie Group and also turned out to be the sixth CEO of Macquarie Group.

In 2018, she was appointed as the commissioner of the Global Commission on Adaptation, a commission which was initiated by the World Bank to implement and accelerate climate adaptation action plan. In 2019, she was appointed to the UN's Climate Finance Leadership Initiative by Michael Bloomberg.

She is the only female CEO among Australia's 20 biggest companies by market value and the first Asian-Australian woman to head an ASX 200 listed company. In 2019, she also entered the record books as the first woman ever to become Australia's top earning CEO.

She was ranked 29th in the list of Most Powerful Women in the World for the Year 2020 by Forbes. She was ranked 24th in the list of Most Powerful Women in the World for the Year 2021 by Forbes. She was also named as one of Fortune's Most Powerful and Influential Women in a roundup of global female business leaders segment. She was ranked ninth on Fortune's list of Most Powerful Women in 2023.

She was also one of the speakers who attended the 2021 United Nations Climate Change Conference which was held in Glasgow and she spoke about the mobilising private climate finance for emerging markets. Her presence at the Glasgow G20 International Conference on Climate burnished her reputation and emphasised her green credentials while she was also seated next to Australian Prime Minister Scott Morrison. She was initially implied as the de facto leader of Australian delegation during the COP26 summit as rumours started circulating that Morrison would not be attending the COP26 conference. In July, 2024, Macquarie announced it had reversed its coal policy, paving the way for its bankers to be involved in coal-sector consolidation on Australia's east coast and coal mines globally.

She was also named as of the Australian Financial Review Business People of the Year for 2021 in recognition of her leadership prowess amid the COVID-19 pandemic related uncertainties.

She received $16.39 million in compensation in 2021. This coincided with Macquarie recording a $1.3 billion profit in the last quarter of 2021.

She also provides advice and consultancy on green technology investment to the Government of Australia.

She was also appointed as the co-chair of the Climate Finance Leadership Initiative in India.

In 2026, Wikramanayake announced that she will retire from her position at the Macquarie Group in November, she will be replaced by Greg Ward.

== Personal life ==
She was born in England, where her Sri Lankan father was a doctor. Her father Ranji had graduated from the medical school in 1958 and alongside his wife Amara, he moved to England for further training in medicine in 1958. The family faced major constraints and difficulties during their brief stay in England and left the country soon after allegations were made against her grandfather over the breach of money control laws. Her family also said that they had experienced racism in England.

Wikramanayake attended a state school in London before the family moved to Australia, where she went to Ascham School. She moved to Australia at the age of 14 along with her family in the 1970s and the family had only around $200 with them when they reached Australia. In 2018, in an interview with Australian Financial Review her father Ranji Wikramanayake recalled their life in Sri Lanka and said that they had had a privileged life in Sri Lanka but migrated to Australia after some hard times. The Wikramanayake family settled in Australian city Sydney in 1975 and Ranji was offered a part-time job at the Royal Prince Alfred Hospital.

She received a Bachelor of Commerce and Bachelor of Law from the University of New South Wales in 1985. and later completed the Advanced Management Program at Harvard Business School in 1996.

Wikramanayake is married to Ed Gilmartin, an investment banker, and has a son and a daughter. She has an elder sister who is a lawyer and a brother who is a surgeon.
