= J. Christopher Flowers =

American investment manager (born 1957)

- Born: James Christopher Flowers; 1957 (age 67–68); Berkeley, California, U.S.
- Education: Harvard University (BA)
- Occupation(s): Private equity, Humanitarian, and Philanthropist
- Employer(s): J.C. Flowers & Co. Goldman Sachs (prior)
- Known for: Financial services investing, J.C. Flowers & Co., J.C. Flowers Foundation
- Title: Managing Director and CEO
- Spouses: Mary White (m. 1984, divorced); Anne Flowers

James Christopher Flowers (born 1957) is an American private equity investor and investment manager focused on the financial services industry. He is a managing director and CEO of J.C. Flowers & Co., and a member of the firm's Management Committee.

== Early life and education ==
Flowers was born in 1957 in Berkeley, California. He grew up in Wayland, Massachusetts, where he attended Wayland High School. He graduated magna cum laude from Harvard University with a degree in Applied Mathematics.

== Professional career ==
=== Goldman Sachs ===
Flowers worked at Goldman Sachs for 19 years starting in March 1979, and was a founder of Goldman's financial institutions merger practice in the 1980s. Flowers was named partner in 1988, the same year as former Goldman CEO Lloyd Blankfein and former Merrill Lynch CEO John Thain. At 31, he was one of the youngest Goldman Sachs partners in history. Flowers retired from Goldman in 1998, one of fifteen partners to leave the bank prior to its 1998 initial public offering.

=== J.C. Flowers & Co. ===
In 1998, Flowers founded J.C. Flowers & Co., a private equity advisory and fund management firm which has acquired major equity stakes in Shinsei, NIBC Bank, HSH Nordbank and other financial institutions. As of 2017, the company manages assets of US$6.7 billion.

Flowers was the main partner of Ripplewood Holdings CEO Tim Collins in the 2000 acquisition of Long-Term Credit Bank of Japan to form Shinsei Bank. He became a director of Shinsei Bank in March 2000. Shinsei's initial public offering in 2004 netted a profit of approximately $1 billion for himself and $7 billion total for his investment group. However, the value of the investor group's stake decreased in the following years.

=== Involvement in the 2008 financial crisis ===
After an unsuccessful attempt to arrange an acquisition of Sallie Mae in 2007, Flowers became deeply involved in the 2008 financial crisis. He was approached by AIG to advise it on avoiding an imminent financial collapse. Flowers was well acquainted with Treasury Secretary Henry Paulson from their days together at Goldman Sachs, and was among the first to warn Paulson of the impending disaster at AIG. Flowers continued to advise Bank of America as it gave up on a Lehman acquisition and went on to acquire Merrill Lynch. Flowers's role in the crisis was portrayed by Michael O'Keefe in the 2011 HBO film Too Big to Fail.

In September 2008, Flowers also purchased the First National Bank of Cainesville, a regional bank in Missouri, renaming it Flowers National Bank. Flowers sold the bank to Farmers Bank of Northern Missouri in 2016.

In June 2014, Flowers completed the first public listing of a British bank on the London Stock Exchange's main market for more than a decade when he floated U.K. bank OneSavings Bank (OSB), a small business and mortgage lender he bought into in 2010. Later that year, he argued that banking regulations after the 2008 financial crisis had depressed profitability so much that lenders would struggle to attract enough investors to survive the next financial crisis. In 2016, Fortune reported that he suffered heavy losses from the Brexit vote, largely as a result of private equity investments in OSB; however, by 2018, Flowers had completely exited OSB in one of the most profitable recent financial services deals.
