= Xentral ERP Software =

Enterprise resource planning company

- Type: Private
- Industry: Enterprise Resource Planning (ERP)
- Founded: 2008
- Founder: Benedikt Sauter, Claudia Sauter
- Headquarters: Augsburg, Germany
- Key people: Domenico Cipolla (CEO, since 2024); Benedikt Sauter (Co-Founder, Product & Customer Focus)
- Number of employees: 200+
- Website: xentral.com

Xentral ERP Software is a German enterprise resource planning (ERP) company headquartered in Augsburg, Germany. The company provides cloud-based ERP services primarily for small and medium-sized enterprises (SMEs) in the e-commerce, retail, and B2B sectors.

== History ==
In 2008, Benedikt Sauter and Claudia Sauter founded the company under the name embedded projects GmbH. At first, it sold computer hardware. In the early 2010s, the couple developed an in‑house ERP service based on open‑source technology to support their hardware business. This system laid the foundation for what would later become Xentral ERP.

The ERP product was initially marketed under the name waWision. On 23 November 2018, the product was rebranded as Xentral, shifting focus from hardware to software and setting the stage for the ERP product's market rollout.

In early 2018, Xentral received its first external funding from Frank Thelen and his firm Freigeist Capital.

In March 2020, Xentral released version 20.1 of its on‑premise software, featuring integrated integrations for Shopware 6, Shopify, WooCommerce, and Gambio. This update introduced mobile optimization and a redesigned user interface.

By January 2021, Xentral had grown to serve around 1,000 SMEs and secured a US$20 million Series A investment led by Sequoia Capital, with participation from Visionaries Club.

In August 2021, the company raised a $75 million Series B funding round led by Tiger Global Management and Meritech Capital, with continued participation from Sequoia, Visionaries Club, and Freigeist Capital. This brought Xentral's total known funding to approximately $95 million.

In December 2022, Benedikt Sauter was awarded the Gründergeist Award 2022 by Hochschule Augsburg, and Xentral won the Best Omnichannel Solution award at the E‑commerce Germany Awards 2022.

At the end of 2023, Domenico Cipolla joined as Co‑CEO to support the company's scale‑up phase, allowing Benedikt Sauter to focus more on product development and customer engagement. In 2023, Xentral reported processing €3 billion in commercial transactions.

By 2024, Xentral had been valued at around €670 million and was described as a potential unicorn.

== Products and services ==
Xentral provides a cloud-based ERP platform aimed at growing small and medium-sized commerce businesses. Its functionality covers order processing, warehouse management and fulfillment, multichannel e-commerce, procurement, and financial workflows, including the export of records to the German accounting standard DATEV. The software is delivered through five-tier subscription packages and runs entirely in a web browser without on-premise installation.

The platform offers pre-built integrations with online shops, online marketplaces, shipping carriers, and payment providers. Integrations are maintained through an in-house middleware layer called Xentral Connect, which includes Xentral Flows, an automation platform, and the Flow Editor, an automation builder. Xentral is an API-driven cloud ERP that connects shops, marketplaces, and carriers in a single platform, while noting a learning curve during implementation.

In 2026, Xentral introduced artificial intelligence (AI) and automated "agentic" capabilities into its enterprise resource planning (ERP) software. The system includes an AI-assisted copilot that generates SQL-based reports from natural-language prompts, optical character recognition (OCR) for supplier invoices, and automated data import tools. Xentral is developing and beta-testing AI features designed to automate order creation, returns processing, and customer inquiries, utilizing a review framework that requires manual approval before completion. Future updates are planned to introduce capabilities for managing remittance advice and supplier invoices, alongside a Model Context Protocol (MCP) server to connect the platform with external large language models such as Claude and ChatGPT.
