= Fox-Pitt Kelton Cochran Caronia Waller =

- Type: Private
- Industry: Investment banking
- Founded: 1971
- Founder: Oliver Fox-Pitt; Robin Kelton
- Fate: acquired by Macquarie Group (2009)
- Headquarters: London, England, United Kingdom; New York, New York, United States
- Products: Financial services
- Number of employees: 285
- Parent: Swiss Re (former); J.C. Flowers & Co. (former); Macquarie Group (current)
- Website: www.fpk.com

Fox-Pitt Kelton Cochran Caronia Waller (formerly Fox-Pitt, Kelton or FPK) was an investment bank focused on mergers and acquisitions advisory services, private placements of debt and equity as well as equity research. FPK specialised in transactions involving financial institutions and financial services companies.

The firm, which had eight offices globally in London, New York, Chicago, Hartford, San Francisco, Boston, Hong Kong and Tokyo had approximately 285 employees.

It was acquired by Macquarie Group in November 2009.

== History ==
The firm was founded in 1971 by Oliver Fox-Pitt and Robin Kelton, with assistance from Len Caronia. After expanding to the U.S. in the 1980s, FPK launched Eldon, a financial services focused investment manager, in 1994 (Eldon was sold to Hiscox in 2003).

Swiss Reinsurance Co. acquired FPK in 1998 for US$200 million. Under Swiss Re's ownership, the firm expanded further globally, entering Asia.

A consortium led by private equity firm J.C. Flowers & Co. and the bank's management led by Giles Fitzpatrick, CEO, purchased Fox-Pitt from Swiss Reinsurance Co. in February 2006. Lazard investment banker Gary Parr also invested in Fox-Pitt.

Cochran Caronia Waller logo, prior to its acquisition by Fox-Pitt, Kelton

Under management and private equity ownership, the firm acquired another investment boutique, Chicago-based Cochran Caronia Waller (CCW) in 2007. CCW was founded in 1997 as Cochran Caronia & Co by George Cochran, Leonard Caronia and John Waller and was renamed Cochran Caronia Waller in 2006. Like FPK, it specialised in financial services, focusing on the property-casualty, life and health sectors. Among the notable transactions in which the firm was involved, FPK, and its co-owner J. Christopher Flowers, advised Bank of America on its acquisition of Merrill Lynch in 2008.

In 2009, Macquarie Group, Australia's largest investment bank, entered into serious discussions about a takeover of Fox-Pitt Kelton from its current ownership, and on September 30, 2009, the two firms announced a purchase agreement valuing Fox-Pitt Kelton at US$146.7 million. Macquarie's acquisition of Fox-Pitt Kelton was completed in November 2009.
