= NIBC Bank =

Commercial bank in the Netherlands

Coordinates: 52°05′16″N 4°17′53″E

NIBC Bank N.V.
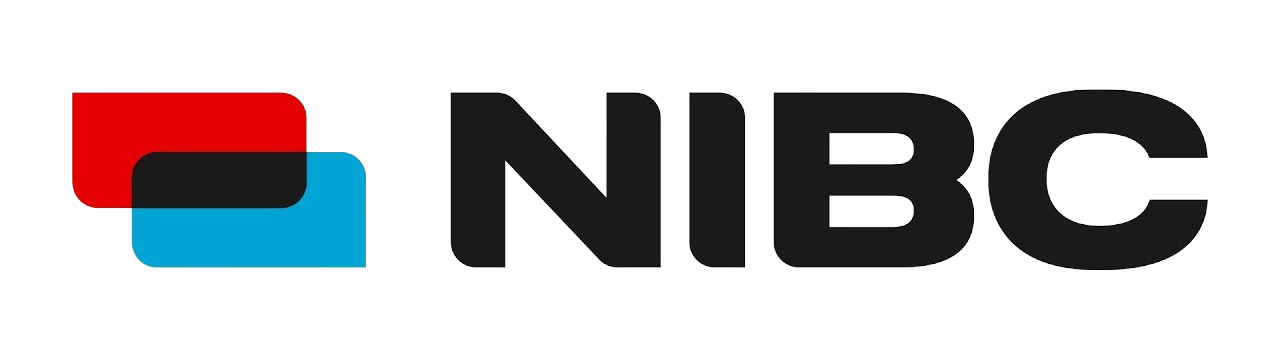

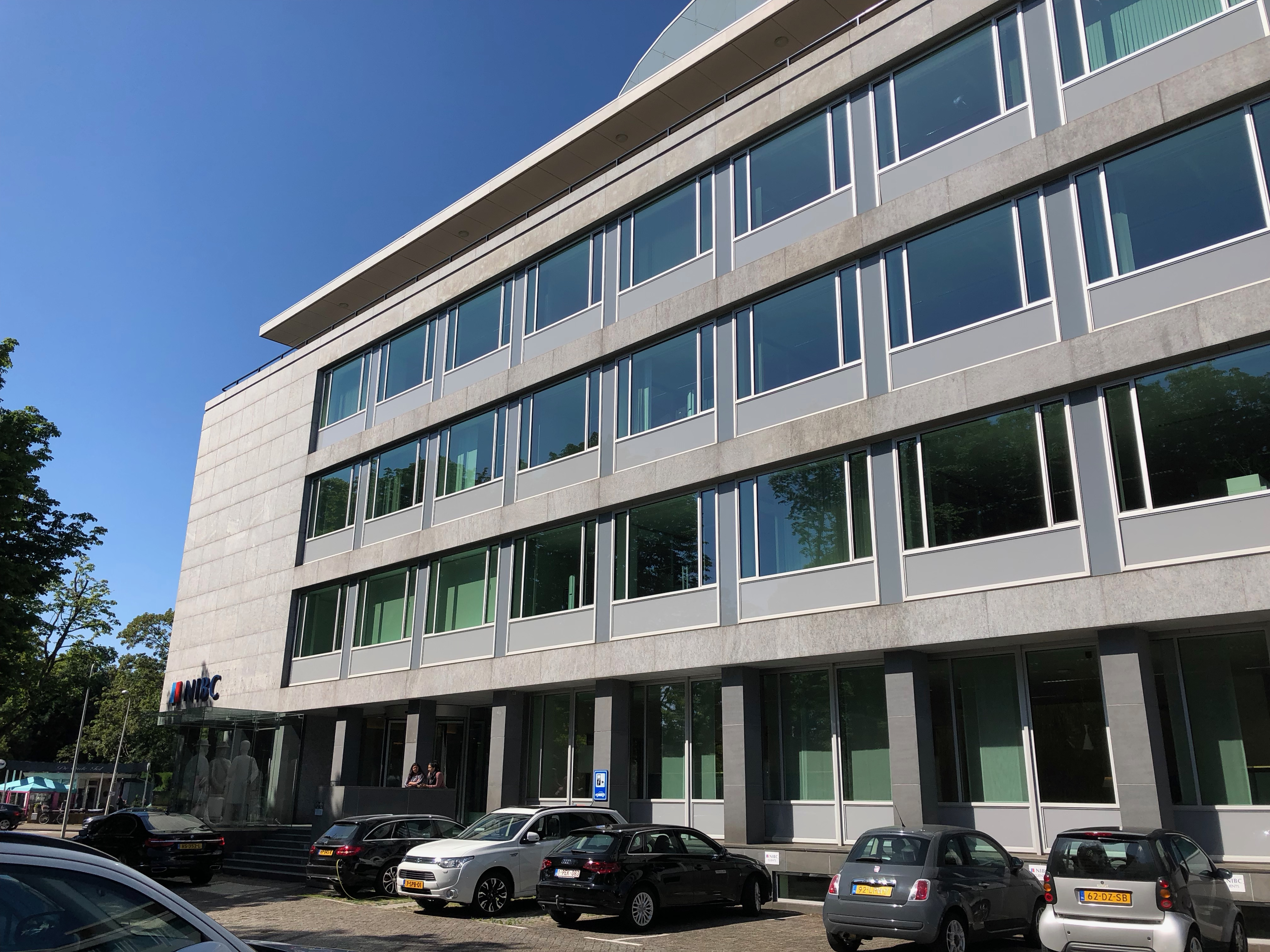
- NIBC Bank The Hague
- Type: Naamloze Vennootschap
- Traded as: Euronext Amsterdam: NIBC
- Industry: Financial services
- Founded: 1945
- Headquarters: The Hague, Netherlands
- Products: Commercial banking Retail Banking
- Total assets: €22,925 billion (Q2 2025)
- Number of employees: 666
- Website: www.nibc.com

NIBC Bank N.V. is a commercial bank in the Netherlands offering corporate and retail banking products and services. Its corporate banking activities range from advising, structuring, financing and co-investing across debt and equity in Northwest Europe with a focus on the Netherlands and Germany. The retail banking activities primarily consist of mortgage lending in the Netherlands and online retail savings products and services in the Netherlands, Germany and Belgium via the NIBC Direct brand.

NIBC Bank N.V., a publicly traded entity which is in turn majority owned by a consortium of international financial institutions and investors organised by J.C. Flowers & Co. NIBC has offices in The Hague, Amsterdam, Frankfurt, London and Brussels. As of 2016, NIBC Bank was the ninth-largest bank in the Netherlands in terms of total assets.

== History ==
NIBC was incorporated on 31 October 1945 as Maatschappij tot Financiering van Nationaal Herstel by the Dutch government along with a number of commercial banks and institutional investors to provide financing for the post-World War II economic recovery of the Netherlands. This entity was renamed De Nationale Investeringsbank ("DNIB") in 1971 and was listed on the Dutch stock exchange, now Euronext Amsterdam, from 1986 to 1999. During this time, DNIB focused on providing and participating in long-term loans and private equity investments. In 1996, DNIB started its retail business through the offering of white label residential mortgages.

In 1999, DNIB was acquired by way of a public offer made through a joint venture company, NIB Capital, owned by two of Europe’s largest pension funds, ABP and PGGM. NIB Capital acquired 85 per cent of the shares in DNIB. The remaining shares remained owned by the Dutch government and were acquired by NIB Capital in 2004. The acquisition by NIB Capital in 1999 marked the beginning of DNIB’s evolution from a long-term lending bank to a bank offering advisory, financing and investment services.

In 2005, a consortium of international financial institutions and investors organised by J.C. Flowers & Co., a U.S.-based private investment firm, purchased all the outstanding equity interests of NIB Capital. In connection with this acquisition, NIBC Holding N.V. was incorporated and NIB Capital, which was renamed NIBC N.V., became its wholly owned subsidiary. Subsequently, NIBC N.V. (as the non-surviving entity) merged into NIBC Holding N.V. (as acquiring company) and NIB Capital Bank became the holding's direct subsidiary. NIB Capital Bank subsequently changed its name to NIBC Bank N.V.

In 2014, NIBC acquired Gallinat-Bank AG in Germany, which was later renamed to NIBC Bank Deutschland AG. NIBC’s Corporate Client Offering activities in Germany are being conducted predominantly from this entity. This entity funds itself in the German corporate and institutional market and is covered by the German Einlagensicherungsfonds ("ESF").

In June 2016 NIBC Bank finalised the acquisition of SNS Securities N.V. The activities of SNS Securities continue to be operated under the name NIBC Markets, which merged into NIBC Bank in June 2017. With the acquisition of SNS Securities, NIBC expanded its service offering with capital market solutions, equity and fixed income brokerage and research.

In March 2018 NIBC Holding N.V. got publicly listed at Euronext Amsterdam.

In July 2020, private equity firm Blackstone acquired NIBC for €1 billion. On 12 November 2025, Dutch lender ABN AMRO announced the acquisition of NIBC Bank for 960 million euros from American private equity firm Blackstone. ABN AMRO finalised the acquisition in August 2026, paving the way to the incorporation of NIBC Bank.

== See also ==
- List of banks in the euro area
- List of banks in the Netherlands
