= Katharina Borchert =

German journalist

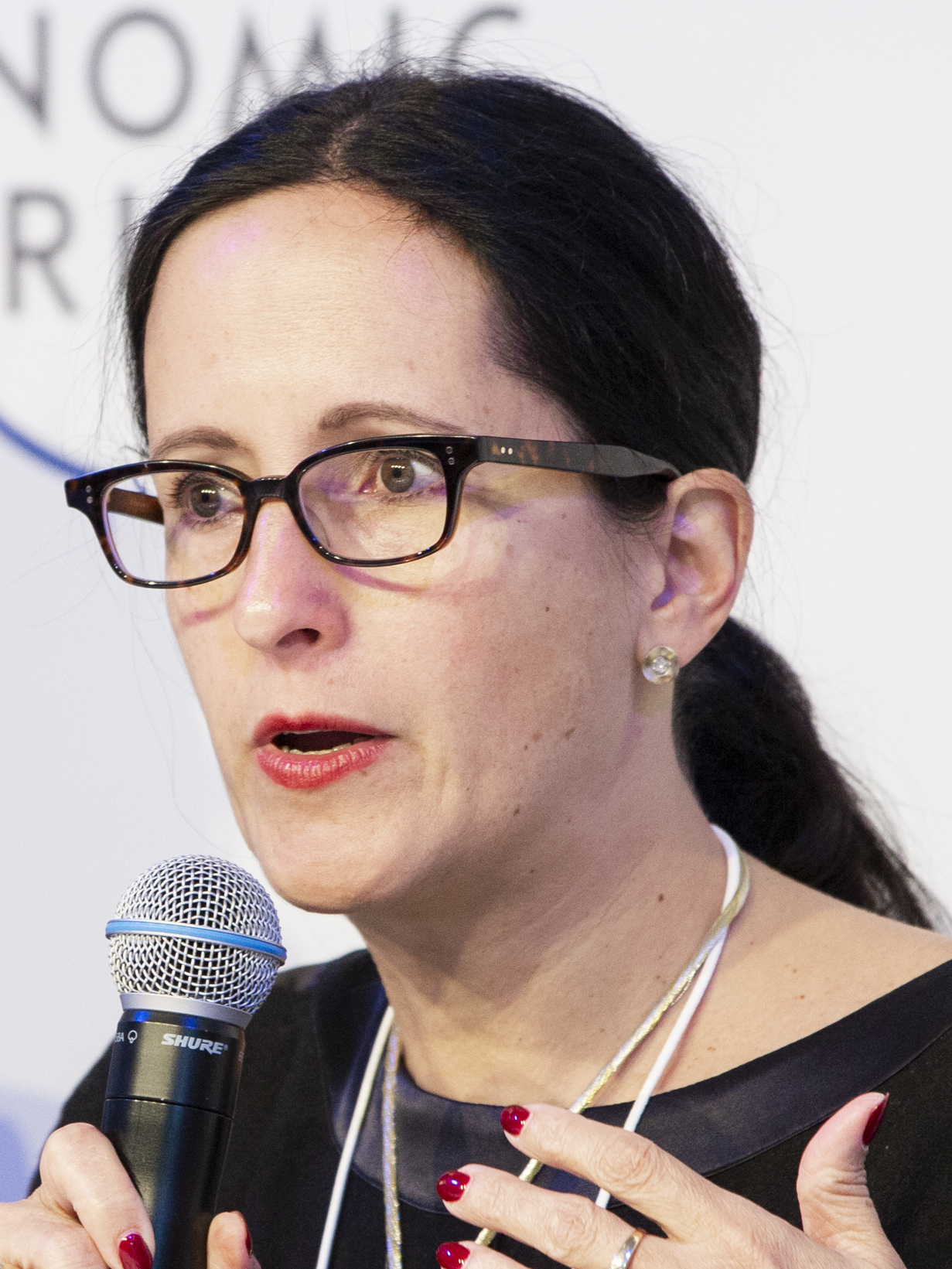
Borchert during the WEF 2019

Katharina Borchert (born Bochum, 1972) is a German journalist and technology company executive.

== Biography ==
Katharina Borchert is the daughter of the former German minister Jochen Borchert (1993–1998, CDU).

Borchert studied law and journalism at the Universities Hamburg and Lausanne. She was previously the managing director at Spiegel Online.

From 2016 to 2020, she was the chief innovation officer at Mozilla, and previously served on the Mozilla Board of Directors from 2014 to 2015.
