= J.C. Flowers & Co. =

American private equity investment firm

J.C. Flowers & Companies
- Type: Private
- Industry: Private equity Financial services
- Founded: 1998; 28 years ago
- Founder: J. Christopher Flowers
- Headquarters: New York, New York, United States
- Key people: J. Christopher Flowers (Chairman & CEO); Tim Hanford and Eric Rahe (co presidents)
- Products: Leveraged buyout, Growth capital
- AUM: US$5 billion
- Website: jcfco.com

J.C. Flowers & Co. is an American private equity investment firm, focused on investments in the financial services sector. The firm, founded in 1998, is based in New York City and run by billionaire J. Christopher Flowers, a former Goldman Sachs partner.

As of 2026, the firm had invested more than $18 billion in capital.

== History ==
J.C. Flowers & Co. was founded by J. Christopher Flowers in 1998. In March 2000, Flowers and the private equity firm Ripplewood Holdings led the consortium that bought the Long-Term Credit Bank of Japan from the Japanese government for about US$1.1 billion. It became the first Japanese bank under foreign ownership, and was renamed Shinsei Bank. J.C. Flowers raised its first fund, of US$900 million, in 2002. Flowers and Ripplewood made large profits when Shinsei went public in February 2004. In 2005, an investor group led by J.C. Flowers bought the Dutch bank NIBC for €2.1 billion.

In 2006, J.C. Flowers raised US$7 billion for its second fund, then a record for a fund focused solely on financial services. That year, a consortium led by the firm bought WestLB's stake of about a quarter of HSH Nordbank for about €1.25 billion, making J.C. Flowers the first foreign investor in a German Landesbank.

In 2007, an investor group led by JC Flowers signed an agreement to purchase Sallie Mae for approximately $25 billion, giving JC Flowers and Friedman Fleischer & Lowe 50.2 percent of the company. This deal fell through, however. In November 2007, J.C. Flowers-led group, including Swiss Re and Banco Santander, agreed to invest ¥202 billion (US$1.8 billion) in Shinsei Kaupthing Bank had agreed in August 2007 to buy NIBC for €3 billion, but called off the purchase in January 2008 and NIBC's shareholders, led by J.C. Flowers, undertook to provide the bank with €300 million in new capital. In late 2007, JC Flowers was one of the many companies bidding for the troubled British Bank, Northern Rock. They pulled out of the bidding in December.

On January 21, 2008, JC Flowers made an informal bid of £4bn for Friends Provident. A revised bid of £3.5 billion was rejected. On March 14, 2008, JC Flowers was reported to be in talks to buy troubled US investment bank Bear Stearns. On April 16, 2008, JC Flowers issued an offer to buy 24.9% of the shares of Hypo Real Estate Group at a price of €22.50 per share. At the end of 2006, JC Flowers purchased a company called PanEuroLife in Luxembourg and started to build the NewPELGroup.

In 2009, the firm raised US$2.3 billion for its third fund. That year, it was part of an investor group that bought the assets of IndyMac, which became OneWest Bank and was sold to CIT Group for US$3.4 billion in 2014. In November 2009, J.C. Flowers appointed Callum McCarthy, a former chairman of the Financial Services Authority (FSA), as its European chairman, and David Morgan, a former chief executive of Westpac, as its London managing director.

In 2010, J.C. Flowers rescued the Kent Reliance Building Society with a £50 million investment, and the society's business became OneSavings Bank. Together with Castle Trust, another British challenger bank backed by the firm, it made up 46 percent of the third fund by 2016. In December 2012, JC Flowers was reported to have submitted a non-binding first-round bid for the 316 branches being re-auctioned by The Royal Bank of Scotland Group. In July 2013, JC Flowers agreed to buy £450 million of loans belonging to struggling British bank Northern Rock.

In October 2016, Interactive Investor agreed to buy the European online brokerage business of TD Bank with financing from J.C. Flowers funds, which were to hold a majority of the merged broker. In May 2017, JC Flowers completed the acquisition of the insurance company UK General for an undisclosed sum.

In February 2018, a consortium led by Cerberus Capital Management and J.C. Flowers agreed to buy 94.9 percent of HSH Nordbank from the German states of Hamburg and Schleswig-Holstein for about €1 billion, the first sale of a German Landesbank to private owners. The sale was completed in November 2018, and the bank was to take the name Hamburg Commercial Bank in February 2019. By 2022, J.C. Flowers owned 35 percent of it. In 2018, NIBC went public again, J.C. Flowers bought Piraeus Bank Romania from the Greek Piraeus Bank and renamed it First Bank, and the Abu Dhabi Investment Authority bought the firm's 21.4 percent stake in the British insurer Pension Insurance Corporation, in which J.C. Flowers had been a founding investor.

In 2019, J.C. Flowers and other investors sold about US$700 million of Shinsei shares, reducing the firm's stake from 21.4 percent to 3.8 percent, and Flowers left the bank's board. In 2020, J.C. Flowers and Reggeborgh, holders of 75 percent of NIBC between them, agreed to sell the bank to Blackstone, which later negotiated a lower price, citing the COVID-19 pandemic, and completed the purchase in early 2021 for about €1 billion. In November 2020, J.C. Flowers and Pelican Ventures agreed to buy the reinsurer Ariel Re, which underwrites through a Lloyd's of London syndicate, from Argo Group, and the firm was among the investors that put US$800 million into the launch of the London-based insurer Inigo. In July 2021, it agreed to pay US$300 million for 30 percent of LMAX Group, a London-based operator of exchanges for foreign exchange and cryptocurrency trading. In December 2021, abrdn agreed to buy interactive investor for £1.49 billion from shareholders that included a fund advised by J.C. Flowers.

J.C. Flowers raised more than US$1.1 billion for its fifth fund, which closed in August 2022. In September 2022, Yes Bank's board approved selling about ₹48,000 crore of stressed loans to JC Flowers ARC, under terms agreed with J.C. Flowers that also allowed the bank to take up to 19.99 percent of the asset reconstruction company. In 2024, J.C. Flowers sold First Bank to Intesa Sanpaolo, and took part, alongside Liberty Strategic Capital, in an agreement led by Sixth Street to take Enstar Group private in a US$5.1 billion transaction. At the end of 2025, it completed the purchase of the US motor insurance business of Admiral Group, including Elephant Insurance of Richmond, Virginia. In June 2026, J.C. Flowers completed its purchase of the French subsidiary of Banca Monte dei Paschi di Siena, which had about €1 billion in assets, and led an investor group that agreed to buy the consumer lender Republic Finance, based in Plano, Texas, from CVC Capital Partners.

As of March 2026, private equity firm Centerbridge Partners was believed to have held talks with JC Flowers regarding a potential partnership to take over Irish lender Permanent TSB (PTSB).

== Investments ==
=== Current ===
- Jefferson Capital
- Ariel Re
- Pepper Advantage
- OneItalia Alliance
- Elephant Insurance
- Accelerated Wealth Partners
- Enstar Group

=== Former ===
- Shinsei Bank
- NIBC Bank N.V. (sold to Blackstone, 2020)
- Chi-X Asia Pacific (sold to Cboe Global Markets, 2021)
- OneSavings Bank
- Interactive Investor
- AmeriLife (recapitalized with Thomas H. Lee Partners, 2020)
- First Bank (Romania) (sold to Intesa Sanpaolo, 2024)
- Eurovita (sold to Cinven, 2017)
- Fox-Pitt Kelton
- Equita SIM
- HSH Nordbank
- Hypo Real Estate
- MF Global

== Funds ==
JC Flowers manages six private equity funds:

Fund	Close	Committed capital
J.C. Flowers I L.P.	2002	$900 million
J.C. Flowers II L.P.	2006	$7.0 billion
J.C. Flowers III L.P.	2009	$2.3 billion
J.C. Flowers IV L.P.	2016	$0.76 billion
J.C. Flowers V L.P.	2022	$1.1 billion
J.C. Flowers VI L.P.	2025	N/A
