= HackFwd =

HackFwd GmbH
- Company type: GmbH
- Founded: Hamburg, Germany (2010)
- Headquarters: Hamburg, Germany
- Website: www.hackfwd.com

HackFwd was a German pre-seed company started in 2010 by Lars Hinrichs. HackFwd only planned to invest in developers with prototypes or demos for a fixed timeframe of 12 months. The timeframe was used to get to beta and create a viable business case. HackFwd claimed to provide a support structure doing all administrative work helping with finding advisors. Of the 30% equity stake that HackFwd takes, 3% were given back to the founders to distribute to advisors and mentors. HackFwd's headquarters were in Hamburg, and the company intended to invest across Europe.

HackFwd provided funding to startups of one to three people for a year. As of early 2011 funding ranged from 91,000 EUR to 191,000 EUR depending on the size of the founding team. The investment sizes are fixed and detailed on the website. HackFwd differed from many accelerators and incubators in that the startups invested in did not move to a central location. Instead, they run quarterly events (called Build events) where all HackFwd members come together for feedback and expert mentorship sessions, which were designed to offer the most relevant support to startups in different phases of the program. Some material from the Build events were made public on the Where Passion Meets Momentum video website.

HackFwd made most of the funding process transparent and released much material in the public, including a standardized contract called “Geek Agreement”, which details the terms of finance. While a startup could not directly apply to the program, they could find a person who is part of the referrer network (staff, founders, alumni, academia) and go through them. All referrers were listed on the website. HackFwd's business model evaluation tool Phase 2 Generator was also publicly available, and could be used to submit a business idea to a referrer, or privately as a tool for constructing and evaluating a business model.

The company was shut down in December 2013 due to its limited economic success.
