= Liquidity ratio =

Accounting concept

In accounting, the liquidity ratio expresses a company's ability to repay short-term creditors out of its total cash. It is the result of dividing the total cash by short-term borrowings. It shows the number of times short-term liabilities are covered by cash. If the ratio is greater than 1.0, it means fully covered.

The formula is: LR = (liquid assets)/(short-term liabilities)

== Variants ==
Liquidity ratios measure how quickly assets can be turned into cash in order to pay the company's short-term obligations. The following metrics can also be considered to measure the liquidity of a firm.

- Current ratio measures whether a firm has enough resources to meet its short-term obligations. It is the ratio of a firm's current assets to its current liabilities.
- Quick ratio (also known as an acid test) measures the ability of a company to use near-cash ("quick") assets to eliminate current liabilities immediately.
- Reserve requirement, a bank regulation that sets the minimum reserves each bank must hold.
- Working capital, a financial metric that represents operating liquidity available.
- Crisis liquidity ratio. A number of Bulgarian academic and accounting publications discuss the "crisis liquidity ratio" (CLR), defined as:

CLR = (current assets − receivables)/(current liabilities)
and recommend its use under stressed conditions, as receivables may be less reliably realizable during crises. Several authors present CLR as a conservative variant of short-term liquidity assessment for stress scenarios, excluding receivables due to heightened collectability risk.

== See also ==
- Accounting liquidity
- Liquidity coverage ratio
- Market liquidity
