= Lars Hinrichs =

German entrepreneur and investor (born 1976)

- Hinrichs in 2026
- Born: 18 December 1976 (age 49); Hamburg Germany
- Occupations: Entrepreneur and investor
- Known for: Founder of XING; Founder of HackFwd; Member of the Supervisory Board of Deutsche Telekom

Lars Hinrichs (born 18 December 1976, Hamburg, Germany) is a German entrepreneur and investor. Hinrichs is best known as the founder of XING, a Germany focused, but worldwide available, social networking website dedicated mostly to cultivating business contacts.

== Career ==
One of his first ventures, politik-digital.de, was an award-winning platform for politics and new media, which he launched at the age of 22. The company has since evolved into a consultancy for politics, with headquarters in Berlin.

In 2003 Hinrichs founded the Open Business Club GmbH, today XING AG, where both business people and students or job seekers manage their contacts. He took XING public in December 2006 and led the company to a profitable business with annual sales of €35 million and an EBITDA margin of 35%. On 15 January 2009 he resigned from his function as CEO and joined the board of directors. Later in November 2009 Lars Hinrichs sold his stake in XING to Hubert Burda Media. Accordingly, he gave up his board membership at XING in January 2010.

In 2010 he founded HackFwd, a pre-seed investment company that supported European "geeks" investing in prototypes or demos for a fixed timeframe of 12 months. The company was shut down December 2013 due to its inability to sell any single share of the 16 companies they invested in.

Lars supports entrepreneurship and Internet policy on a local, national and European level, and has for example held several meetings with the German chancellor Angela Merkel and with Neelie Kroes, Vice President of the European Commission. He is serving on the supervisory board of Deutsche Telekom AG.

The Apartimentum, a housing project in Hamburg-Rotherbaum, is Hinrichs latest project. It deals with living in the future while focusing on the special needs of expats.

Hinrichs is an active member of the Young Global Leaders (YGL) of the World Economic Forum and the Young Presidents’ Organization (YPO).

== Personal life ==
Hinrichs lives in Hamburg, Germany, and has two children, aged 13 and 11.

== Awards ==
In 2007 Lars Hinrichs received the Media Award LeadAward and the German Internet Prize 2004 of the Federal Ministry of Economics. In August 2008 he was elected Germany's most important web entrepreneur by the Startups Initiative.
