= XING =

Social media website

New Work SE
- Company type: Societas Europaea
- Website type: Professional network service
- Available in: Simplified Chinese; Dutch; English; Finnish; French; German; Hungarian; Italian; Japanese; Korean; Polish; Portuguese; Russian; Spanish; Swedish; Turkish
- Traded as: FWB: NWO
- Founded: August 2003; 23 years ago
- Headquarters: Hamburg, Germany
- Key people: Petra von Strombeck (CEO); Patrick Alberts (CPO); Ingo Chu (CFO); Jens Pape (CTO); Martin Weiss (chairman of the supervisory board)
- Revenue: €235.1 million (2018)
- Total assets: €273.5 million (2018)
- Total equity: €98.3 million (2018)
- Employees: 2327 (2020)
- Website: Official website
- Registration: Required
- Launched: November 2003; 22 years ago

XING is a German career-oriented recruiting, job-search and social networking site, operated by New Work SE (until mid-2019 XING SE) and owned mainly by Hubert Burda Media.

Based in Hamburg, the site is primarily focused on the German-speaking market, alongside XING Spain; it competes with the American platform LinkedIn.

== Company history ==
OPEN Business Club AG was founded in August 2003 in Hamburg, Germany, by Lars Hinrichs. Its official debut was 1 November 2003. It was renamed XING in November 2006.

In its early years, the site pursued a global strategy; however, since 2012, XING has focused on the German-speaking market, as 76% of all XING page views come from Germany and 90% come from the D-A-CH area.

=== Leadership ===
Lars Hinrich led the company as CEO until 2009, when he was succeeded by Stefan Groß-Selbeck. Thomas Vollmoeller then served from 2012 and was succeeded by Petra von Strombeck in 2020.

=== Number of users ===
As of April 2019, XING reported 16 million members, up from 10 million members in the D-A-CH area in March 2016, which at that time included 880,000 premium members.

=== Ownership and acquisitions ===
In November 2009, Hubert Burda Media acquired 25.1% of XING, becoming its main shareholder. In 2010, XING acquired online event management company Amiando, changing its name to XING EVENTS. In 2012, Burda increased its shareholding to over 50%. In 2013, XING acquired Austrian e-recruiting company Kununu. In 2015, XING announced a cooperation project with eyeson, a unified communications provider. In 2017, XING acquired global expat network InterNations and Austrian recruitment company Prescreen. In April 2019, XING paid €22 million for Honeypot, a Berlin-based IT job platform.

XING shareholders
Shareholder	Proportion of holding (in %)
Burda Digital	54.84
Oppenheimer Holdings	5.04
Wasatch Advisors	3.02
Union Investment (majority for DZ Bank )	2.98
DWS Investments (majority for Deutsche Bank )	2.95
Norges Bank	2.83
free float	32.92

=== IPO ===
XING became the first Web 2.0 company to go public in Europe, debuting on 7 December 2006 at an issue price of 30 euros per share.

== Website ==
The platform offers personal profiles, groups, discussion forums, event coordination, and other common social community features. Basic membership is free, but many core functions, like searching for people with specific qualifications or messaging people to whom one is not already connected, can only be accessed by premium members. Premium membership comes at a monthly fee from €6.35 to €9.95 depending on the billing interval and the country one is from. The platform uses https and has a rigid privacy and no-spam policy.

XING has a special Ambassador program for each city or region around the world with a substantial constituency. The Ambassadors hold local events that promote the use of social networking as a business tool, letting members introduce business ideas to one another.

XING also offers the system for closed communities, called Enterprise groups with their own access paths and interface designs. The platform serves as the infrastructure for corporate groups, including IBM, McKinsey, Accenture and others.

About 76% of all pageviews come from Germany, 90% from the D-A-CH area (Germany, Austria and Switzerland).

As of 15 September 2017 XING had changed its legal status to become a Societas Europaea.

=== Revenue ===
XING sales (€)
Year	Sales in € million	Employees
2008	35.3	174
2009	45.1	265
2010	54.3	306
2011	66.2	456
2012	73.3	513
2013	84.8	571
2014	101.4	649
2015	123.0	792
2016	148.5	961
2017	187.8	1,290
2018	235.1	1,567
2019	269.2	1,778
2020	276.5	1,787
2021	284.5	1,712
2022	313.4	1,887

=== XING Mobile ===
Xing.com Mobile allows users to access some of its functions using a mobile phone, PDA or smartphone. Standards supported: HTML 3.2, XHTML MP 1.0, WML 1.1.

=== XING plug-ins ===
Xing.com plugins are available for free download that allow contact synchronization with productivity and office suites such as: Lotus Notes, Microsoft Outlook, Windows Address Book and Outlook Express. It also allows manual CSV File import–export and has a Firefox search plug-in.

== Recruitment ==
Since October 2007, XING has run a job marketplace for candidates and recruiters. Alongside fixed-price job ads, XING was one of the first German job boards to use a pay-per-click payment model, where the cost of an ad is based on user views.

== See also ==
- LinkedIn
- Viadeo
- Professional network service
- Social software
- Social networking service
- List of social networking websites
