= Franz Josef Wagner =

German journalist and writer (1943–2025)

Franz Josef Wagner (7 August 1943 – 6 October 2025) was a German author and journalist. He was editor-in-chief of the magazine Bunte and later of the tabloid B.Z., launched Elle magazine's German edition, and wrote a number of books, one of which was adapted for television.

== Life and career ==
Wagner grew up in Regensburg. His father was a teacher. After finishing his schooling, Wagner worked for the Nürnberger Zeitung, one of Germany's oldest daily newspapers. In the early 1960s he worked as a journalist for Bild in Munich. In 1966 Wagner joined the Axel Springer media company in Hamburg. During this stint at Axel Springer, Wagner was for a time a war correspondent. In 1988, Wagner moved to Hubert Burda Media in Munich. At Hubert Burda Media he served as editor-in-chief of the magazine Bunte. Wagner, together with journalist Günter Prinz, started the German edition of Elle magazine in 1988, and the magazine Superillu in 1990. In 1991 Wagner started the short-lived tabloid Super!. In July 1998 Wagner returned to Axel Springer, becoming editor-in-chief of the tabloid B.Z. He was replaced as editor-in-chief in 2000, after his paper had published a denigrating article about Franziska van Almsick. From early 2001 until his death, Wagner had a column, Post von Wagner, for Bild, the largest German tabloid. This column appeared five times a week, from Monday to Friday. Wagner authored eight books. His last book, an autobiography, was published in 2010.

He was married, had one daughter and lived in Berlin-Charlottenburg. Wagner died on 6 October 2025, at the age of 82.

== Books by Wagner ==
=== Novels ===
- Das Ding, Blanvalet. Munich 1978. ISBN 3-7645-0854-X
  - Adapted into a two-part television film, Das Ding, in 1979 by German television broadcaster ZDF
- Im September, wenn ich noch lebe. Blanvalet. München 1979. ISBN 3-7645-5302-2
- Big Story, Bertelsmann. Munich 1982. ISBN 3-570-01857-1
- Wolfs Spur, Bertelsmann. Munich 1984. ISBN 3-570-00279-9

=== As ghostwriter ===
- Udo Jürgens: Smoking und Blue Jeans – Jahre eines Traumtänzers. Lübbe. Bergisch Gladbach 1984. ISBN 3-7857-0378-3
- Franz Beckenbauer: Ich – Wie es wirklich war. C. Bertelsmann. Munich 1992. ISBN 3-570-02079-7
- Boris Becker: Augenblick, verweile doch … Bertelsmann. Munich 2003. ISBN 3-570-00780-4

=== Autobiography ===
- Brief an Deutschland, Diederichs, Munich 2010, ISBN 978-3-424-35041-8
