= Bambi Award =

German annual media award ceremony

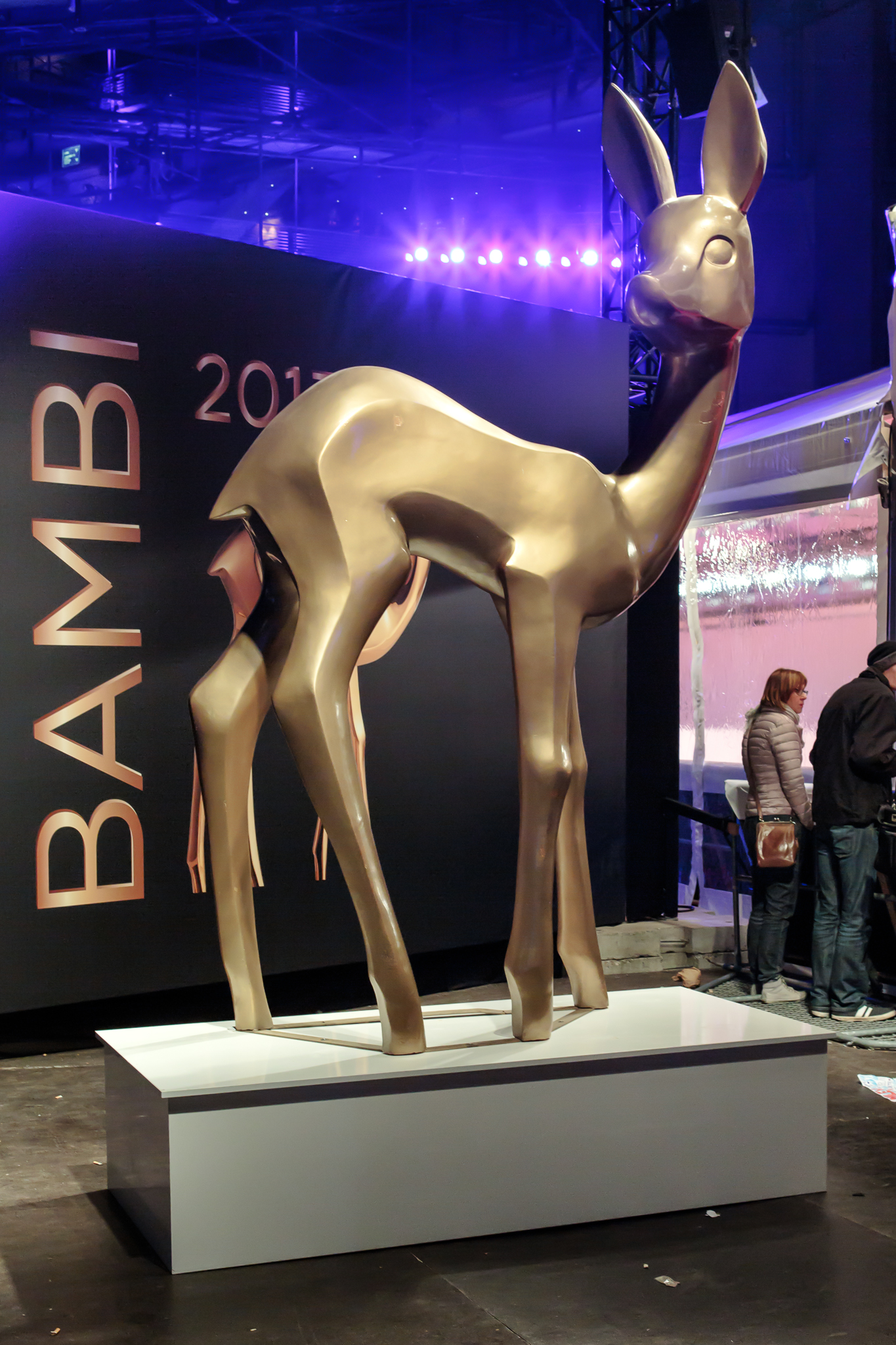
- Statue of Bambi in Berlin, 2013
- Awarded for: Excellence in international media and television
- Country: Germany
- Presented by: Hubert Burda Media
- Website: bambi.de

The Bambi, often called the Bambi Award and stylised as BAMBI, is a German award presented annually by Hubert Burda Media to recognize excellence in international media and television to personalities in the media, arts, culture, sports, and other fields "with vision and creativity who affected and inspired the German public that year", both domestic and foreign. First held in 1948, it is the oldest media award in Germany. The trophy is named after Felix Salten's 1923 book Bambi, a Life in the Woods and its statuettes are in the shape of the novel's titular fawn character. They were originally made of porcelain until 1958, when the organizers switched to using gold, with the casting done by the art casting workshop of Ernst Strassacker in Süßen.

Frequent awardees include Heinz Rühmann (12), Peter Alexander, O. W. Fischer, and Johannes Heesters (10), Sophia Loren (9), Maria Schell (8), Rock Hudson (6), Franz Beckenbauer, Pierre Brice (5), and Céline Dion (3).

== History ==
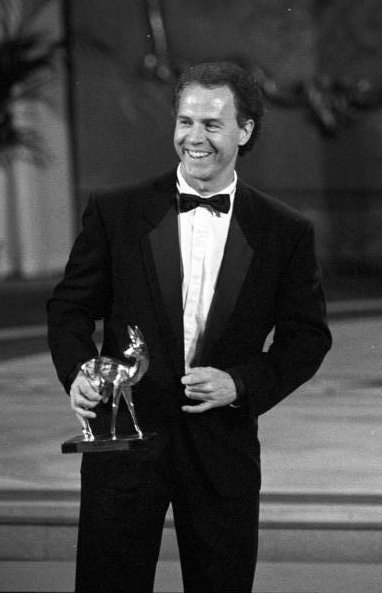
Franz Beckenbauer with a Bambi, Leipzig, 27 November 1990

The Bambi originated in 1948. The first prize winners were actors Jean Marais and Marika Rökk, as well as the DEFA-director Prof. Kurt Maetzig. His movie Ehe im Schatten (Marriage in the Shadows) was chosen as the best German film. At the 60th jubilee of the Bambi in 2008, the co-founder of the DEFA, who celebrated his 100th birthday on 25 January 2011, received a duplicate of a porcelain Bambi, because the original had been broken.

The award trophy was at first a fawn made of white porcelain, which was produced in the Majolika Manufaktur in Karlsruhe by the sculptor Else Bach (1899–1952). Since 1958, the golden-bronze deer has been produced in the art foundry of Ernst Strassacker in the Swabian village of Süßen. According to Marika Rökk's daughter, the name "Bambi" is attributed to her because she had said to her mother, after she brought the prize home: "Oh, you brought a Bambi for me", inspired by the book Bambi by Felix Salten or the 1942 Disney film of the same name.

The Bambi Awards were presented in Karlsruhe between 1948 and 1964, and afterwards in other cities such as Berlin and Offenburg.

In 2002, Michael Jackson won the Pop Artist of the Millennium Award and Anastacia won the Best Newcomer Award. In 2003 and 2004, the awards ceremony took place in the Theater am Hafen in Hamburg. The 2006 Bambi was awarded in the Mercedes-Benz Welt in Stuttgart, hosted by entertainer Harald Schmidt and model Eva Padberg. In 2007, the ceremony was held in the Congress Center in Düsseldorf (CCD), and in 2008 in Offenburg. Both events were presented by Harald Schmidt. Award recipients in 2009 included Colombian singer/songwriter and choreographer Shakira, actress Kate Winslet, Austrian actor Christoph Waltz, and Giorgio Armani, whose niece Roberta Armani accepted the award for him. Shakira performed her single "Did It Again" before accepting her award. The ceremonies of 2009 and 2010 were held in the Metropolis-Hall in Potsdam-Babelsberg. In 2014, the Crown Princess Mary of Denmark received a Bambi in the charity category for her extensive work for women's rights.

Bambi Awards are judged by Hubert Burda and the editors-in-chief at Hubert Burda Media.

== Red carpet hosts ==
- 2011: Jochen Schropp and Maren Lamersdorf
- 2012: Palina Rojinski and Jochen Schropp
- 2013: Maren Lamersdorf and Jochen Schropp
- 2014: Jochen Schropp and Maren Lamersdorf
- 2015: Thore Schölermann and Maren Lamersdorf
- 2016: Rabea Schif and Jochen Schropp
- 2017: Jochen Schropp and Viviane Geppert
- 2018: Carolin Henseler and Jochen Schropp
- 2019: Carolin Henseler and Thomas Brinkmann
- 2023: Carolin Henseler and Thomas Brinkmann
