= Felix Burda Foundation =

German charitable foundation

- Felix Burda Stiftung
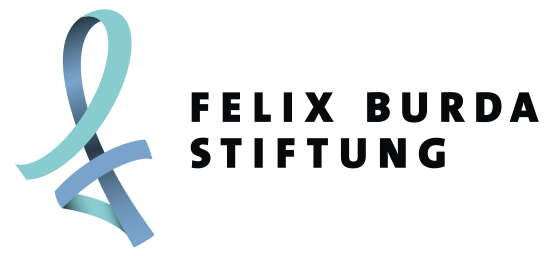
- Formation: 2001
- Founder: Hubert Burda, Christa Maar
- Type: Registered charity (Germany)
- Headquarters: Offenburg
- Key people: Robert Schweizer (chair), Berndt Birkner and Meinhard Classen
- Endowment: 300,000 euros
- Website: www.felix-burda-stiftung.de

The Felix Burda Foundation is a German charitable foundation based in Offenburg. It was founded in 2001 by Christa Maar and Hubert Burda to improve the early detection of colorectal cancer. Among its most well-known initiatives is the "Darmkrebsmonat" or "Colon Cancer Month" in March.

== History ==
In 2001 Felix Burda died of colon cancer at the age of 33. Believing he could have been cured had the disease been recognized earlier, Burda's parents, Christa Maar and Hubert Burda, initiated the Felix Burda Foundation to raise public awareness of the risk of colorectal cancer. Their goal was to halve the colorectal cancer rate within five years.

Leading doctors supported the foundation in its efforts, and in 2001 Wim Wenders created a televised public service announcement for the foundation.

=== Colon Cancer month ===
In 2002, thanks to the Foundation's efforts, March was declared "Colon Cancer Month" to increase media coverage of the issue. Campaigns on the topic of colon cancer prevention and detection are displayed annually in March.

Following the Foundation's campaigning, from 2002 German health insurance was legally required to cover a colonoscopy for all insured people over 55 and a followup procedure ten years later.

Within a year of the first Colon Cancer Month, the number of colonoscopies increased by 34%, which the Foundation saw as a sign of the success of its work. In order to increase this number, health insurance funds were required to offer bonuses to make screenings more attractive to those they insured.

=== The Felix Burda Award ===
The Felix Burda Award was created in 2003 to honor individuals who have made outstanding contributions to the prevention and early detection of colorectal cancer, whether through innovative campaigns, projects or scientific work. Among the first winners were Kai Diekmann, Günther Jauch and Susan Stahnke.

=== Other campaigns ===
The Foundation enlisted Franz Beckenbauer, Maria Furtwängler, Verona Pooth and Harald Schmidt as ambassadors. The Foundation has also campaigned to emphasise early detection for men, who are statistically more at risk of developing colorectal cancer, and for pharmacists to inform their customers about colorectal cancer risk and screenings.

In 2008, the Foundation presented a walk-in model of a colon, to explain the anatomy and function of the organ. About 20 meters long and 2.80 meters high, it is the largest replica of the colon in Europe. The model can be rented and has toured several cities, appearing in public places such as Frankfurt Central Station, along with medical specialists answering questions from visitors. In addition, the Foundation intensified its cooperation with companies to fight colon cancer.

The Foundation was awarded the Special Prize of the German Prize for Business Communication 2009.

The Foundation has worked to incorporate other risk factors, such as a family history of diabetes, into colorectal cancer screening. In 2011, in cooperation with the Assmann Foundation for Prevention, the Foundation launched a mobile app that provides information on measures to prevent various illnesses. The Foundation participated in Germany's National Cancer Plan and helped draft guidelines incorporated into the 2013 Cancer Screening and Registration Act (KFRG). For instance, the foundation called for the introduction of immunological stool tests, which were included in the catalog of benefits for health insurance in 2017. These tests use the smallest traces of blood in the stool, a recognized sign of colorectal cancer, to detect cancer more precisely than traditional stool tests developed in the 1970s.

Recently, the Foundation has worked to address the specific needs of people with a family history of colorectal cancer and to improve the organisation of colon cancer screenings.

== Organization ==
The Felix Burda Foundation is an independent charitable foundation managed in trust by the Hubert Burda Foundation. The registered office is in Offenburg with an office in Munich.The purpose of the foundation is teaching and research in the field of cancer prevention, detection, and control, in particular of colon cancer. It accomplishes its goals through various forms of public relations, such as the organization of conferences or the publication of teaching and training materials.

The Foundation is involved in international organizations in order to promote the exchange of experts in its field. In the early years, for example, colorectal cancer screening in the United States, which had a higher participation and a lower mortality rate than Germany, was an important model for the foundation.

The Foundation has an endowment of 300,000 euros. It is governed by an honorary board of trustees of three to five persons. Christa Maar and Hubert Burda are lifetime members. Other board members are appointed for a term of three, four or five years. In addition to Maar and Burda, the body currently includes internists and gastroenterologists Berndt Birkner and Meinhard Classen. The operational management of the foundation is the responsibility of a board chaired by Robert Schweizer. Other members include Heinz Spengler and Christa Maar, the foundation's managing director.
