= Kathrin Ackermann =

German actress

- Born: 30 January 1938 (age 87); Wiesbaden, Germany
- Occupation: Actress
- Spouse: Bernhard Furtwängler
- Children: 3, including Maria Furtwängler

Kathrin Ackermann (born 30 January 1938) is a German actress.

== Early life ==
Ackermann is a daughter of Hans Ackermann and Elisabeth, née Albert. Her father died during the Second World War in the Battle of France, and her mother married the conductor Wilhelm Furtwängler. He was thus Kathrin Ackermann's stepfather. Ackermann's maternal grandmother was the politician Katharina von Kardorff-Oheimb, who was married to Ernst Albert, a son of the industrialist Heinrich Albert; Ackermann's mother Elisabeth came from this marriage.

== Career ==
Growing up in Lausanne, Ackermann graduated from the Otto Falckenberg School of the Performing Arts in Munich. In 1959, she made her debut at the Bavarian State Theater in Munich, where she worked from 1961 to 1979. After that, she appeared as a freelance actress, particularly on Munich private theaters.

She has also appeared in very different roles in films and on television such as: B. in the television series Die glückliche Familie and Vater wider Willen. She recently gained new popularity in episodes of the crime series Tatort as the mother of Commissioner Charlotte Lindholm, played by her real-life daughter Maria Furtwängler. As a voice actress, Ackermann lent her voice to actress Katey Sagal in her role as Peggy Bundy in the series Married... with Children. Ackermann teaches acting at the Bayerische Theaterakademie August Everding in Munich in the musical course. She also voiced the goddess Athena in the German dub of Hercules: The Animated Series.

== Personal life ==
Ackermann was married to Bernhard Furtwängler, a son of Wilhelm's brother Walter Furtwängler. Their daughter is the actress Maria Furtwängler. In addition to Maria, she has two other children.
