= Burda Style =

Fashion magazine

- Burda Moden
- Content Director: Rashana Rebecca Jennings
- Categories: Fashion; Sewing pattern collection
- Frequency: Monthly
- Founder: Aenne Burda
- First issue: 1950; 76 years ago
- Company: Verlag Aenne Burda GmbH + Co. KG; Hubert Burda Media
- Country: Germany
- Based in: Offenburg
- Language: 17 Languages
- Website: BurdaStyle.com
- ISSN: 0007-6031

Burda Style (formerly Burda Moden) is a fashion magazine published in 17 languages and in over 100 countries. Each issue contains patterns for every design featured that month. The magazine is published by Hubert Burda Media.

== History and profile ==
In 1949, Aenne Burda expanded her family business into women's magazines publishing, founding a fashion magazine printing and publishing company in her home town of Offenburg, Germany. The same year she debuted the magazine Favorit, which was later renamed to Burda Moden. The first issue of Burda Moden magazine was published in 1950 with a circulation of 100,000. It gained popularity after 1952, when it began to include patterns for clothes.

In 1987, Burda Fashion became the first Western magazine to be published in the Soviet Union. In 1994 it became the first Western magazine to appear in the People's Republic of China.

Burda Style launched in the United States in 2013, in partnership with F+W Media.

== See also ==
- List of magazines in Germany
- Hubert Burda Media
- Hubert Burda
