= Bunte =

German weekly magazine

- Sample cover
- Editor-in-Chief: Robert Pölzer
- Frequency: Weekly
- Circulation: 468,710 (02/2017)
- Publisher: Hubert Burda Media
- Founded: 1948; 78 years ago
- Country: Germany
- Based in: Munich
- Language: German
- Website: bunte.de

Bunte (stylized as: BUNTE) is a German-language weekly celebrity gossip magazine published by Hubert Burda Media. The first edition was published in 1948 under the name Das Ufer. Under the leadership of Hubert Burda, Bunte developed into a modern popular magazine. In 2014, Bunte was the 11th most popular media brand in Germany, with 10.57 million monthly users. After Patricia Riekel stepped down, Robert Pölzer took over as Editor-in-Chief in July 2016.

== History ==
After the end of World War II, the French authorities commissioned ex-Nazi publisher Franz Burda to come up with an illustrated magazine and, following their request, he released the first edition in 1948 under the name Das Ufer. Whereas the editorial section was initially provided by the French authorities, an independent editorial team emerged at the end of the 1950s. From the beginning, the magazine reported on a wide variety of events in society. In 1953, marking the coronation of Elisabeth II, a special issue was produced with a circulation of 100,000 copies. Franz Burda had previously taken out a loan to purchase the photo copyrights (against the will of his family). In 1954, Das Ufer changed its name to Bunte Illustrierte, reflecting a key element of large-format photo series in the center of the publication, which were already printed in color.

In the 1950s and 1960s, Bunte developed into one of the most widely distributed West German popular magazines. Acquisitions also played a role in the expansion of the magazine: In 1958, the Deutsche Illustrierte was taken over. In 1960, the Münchner Illustrierte, with a circulation of some 500,000 copies, was added to the portfolio, so that the Bunte Münchner Illustrierte first surpassed the one million mark at the beginning of 1961. In addition, the publishing company bought the traditional Frankfurter Illustrierte in 1963, which was also merged into the Bunte. From then on, the publication was called Bunte Münchner Frankfurter Illustrierte. Beyond focus on high Society, in the 1960s the Bunte more and more frequently featured topics such as post-War rebuilding, cinema films and music. The magazine attracted major attention, for example, with a photo series about the Iron Curtain.

In July 1972, the Bunte Illustrierte first appeared under the abbreviated name of the Bunte. In the years that followed, the magazine was shaped above all by Hubert Burda, who started out in 1974 as an editor at the Bunte. Two years later, he took over the position as Editor-in-Chief from Bernd Ruland. Under his management, the magazine developed into a modern popular magazine for middle class society, and by the mid-1970s, the Bunte had grown to become West Germany's bestselling magazine. In 1983, Burda-Verlag unveiled its new headquarters at Arabellapark in Munich. That same year, various editorial teams, including the Bunte, moved from main headquarters in Offenburg to the Bavarian state capital.

In 1985, Burda-Verlag purchased from Rolf Mengele the handwritten notes of his father, Josef Mengele, which consisted of several thousand pages, for one million Deutsche Marks, which resulted in the Bunte's publishing a series of articles on the notorious doctor from the Auschwitz concentration camp, who was among the perpetrators of gruesome medical experiments on live human beings. The Burda-Verlag did not pay royalties from reprints to Rolf Mengele, instead they went to the survivors of Auschwitz and their dependents.

After the death of Franz Burda in the year 1986, the Burda Group was reorganized. Hubert Burda transitioned from Editor-in-Chief of the Bunte into the position of publisher. His designated successor was initially Peter Boenisch, who, however, already had to relinquish this position at the end of 1986, among other reasons, owing to differences concerning the future direction of the publication and the losses into the millions incurred by the Bunte. At the end of 1986, Lothar Strobach was ultimately appointed as the magazine's new Editor-in-Chief, and Franz Josef Wagner took on the role as co-editor in 1989. After Strobach left the Burda-Verlag in 1994, Wagner remained Editor-in-Chief until the end of 1996. His tenure was only interrupted by an intermezzo of Editor-in-Chief Beate Wedekind, who only lasted one year from 1992/1993 as editorial head of the Bunte, however.

After Wagner was forced to step down due to faltering circulation, Axel Thorer was initially under consideration for Editor-in-Chief at the Bunte. Finally, however, Patricia Riekel took over the management of the magazine in January 1997, and with the beginning of her tenure, the cover of the Bunte for the first time featured a politician, Gerhard Schröder. From then on, politics became an integral part of the publication. An additional example for this is the publication of Defense Minister Rudolf Scharping's vacation photos at a time shortly before Germany's armed forces, the Bundeswehr, faced a deployment abroad. Instead of nobility, Riekel put a spotlight on the so-called "new elites", positioning the Bunte as a magazine for women with "time, money and a desire for high-end gossip." The circulation of the Bunte stabilized and in 2001 even reached a new record.

Under the leadership of Riekel, the magazine developed into one of Germany's most "enigmatic media brands". In 2001, the Berlin daily, Der Tagesspiegel, declared that the Bunte was the new "key medium of our Republic". Whereas other magazines were struggling to make ends meet, the Bunte was able to expand its market share. The publication moved into the center of the so-called "Burda People Group", which later also included the magazines Amica and Tomorrow. In 2002, the Bunte launched its first website in cooperation with T-Online. By contrast, "Bunte TV" was unsuccessful: The magazine aired on ARD was cancelled after only six shows due to low ratings. In 2003, Burda-Verlag invested several million in the relaunch of the Bunte, including better paper quality and a more modern layout. Despite declining circulation, the Bunte was a business success in the years that followed. Together with Focus, the Bunte achieved the lion's share of its publisher's profits.

In 2016, Patricia Riekel left the publication after 1,000 issues of the Bunte. Since then Editor-in-chief Robert Pölzer has been at the helm of the people magazine.

== Circulation ==
The Bunte is one of the most popular media brands of Hubert Burda Media. Like other magazines, however, it saw its reach diminished in recent years. Paid circulation has declined by 31.3 percent since 1998 and is currently 468,710 copies. The share of subscriptions is at around 19.1 percent.

== Criticism ==
The Bunte was repeatedly embroiled in court cases with celebrities. In 1995, for example, Caroline, Princess of Hanover, won what up to that time was the largest-ever award for damages for pain and suffering in the history of the German press before the Higher Regional Court of Hamburg, because the Bunte had published a totally fabricated interview with her. The interview contained numerous untruthful details on her private life. The Bunte's chief editorial staff's counterargument was that they had been duped by an outside agency, which had sold the interview to the publication. In 1996, Tom Cruise sued the Bunte for damages because it wrongly quoted him in an interview as allegedly being "sterile". The Deputy Editor-in-chief Günter Stampf, who had manipulated the interview, was then forced to leave the publishing company. The Bunte apologized to Cruise, who subsequently dropped the lawsuit.

In 2008, the German Press Council reprimanded the Bunte due to a violation of the German Press Code. The publication had run an article on a new car model and, as the German Press Council determined, exceeded the bounds of hidden advertising for the new product. In 2010, the magazine Stern published an exposé reporting that the Bunte had hired an external agency to spy on the private lives of certain politicians. As a result, one of the persons affected, the former SPD Chairman Franz Müntefering, publicly reprimanded the Bunte for its working practices. In 2011, prior to the beginning of the Kachelmann trial, the Bunte published an interview with the moderator's ex-girlfriend, who in exchange is said to have received remuneration of 50,000 Euros. While Kachelmann's defense lawyer raised the topic of the agreement before court, Burda-Verlag rejected the criticism. In 2013, the former German Federal President Christian Wulff filed for a preliminary injunction against the Bunte. The District Court of Cologne forbade the magazine to create the impression that Wulff allegedly had a relationship with a music manager.

The Bunte, in turn, did manage to come up on top in some court cases. In 2010, for example, Charlotte Casiraghi lost a case against the publication. The daughter of Caroline, Princess of Hanover, had originally taken action against the publication of party photos. In 2016, Günther Jauch lost a legal dispute in the last instance concerning the Bunte's reporting on his wedding. Günther Jauch's lawyer alleged that the television host's privacy had been violated. The European Court of Human Rights could discover no violation of rights, however. It held that the German courts had carefully weighed the right to privacy against the informational interest of the public.
