= Maria Furtwängler =

German physician and actress (born 1966)

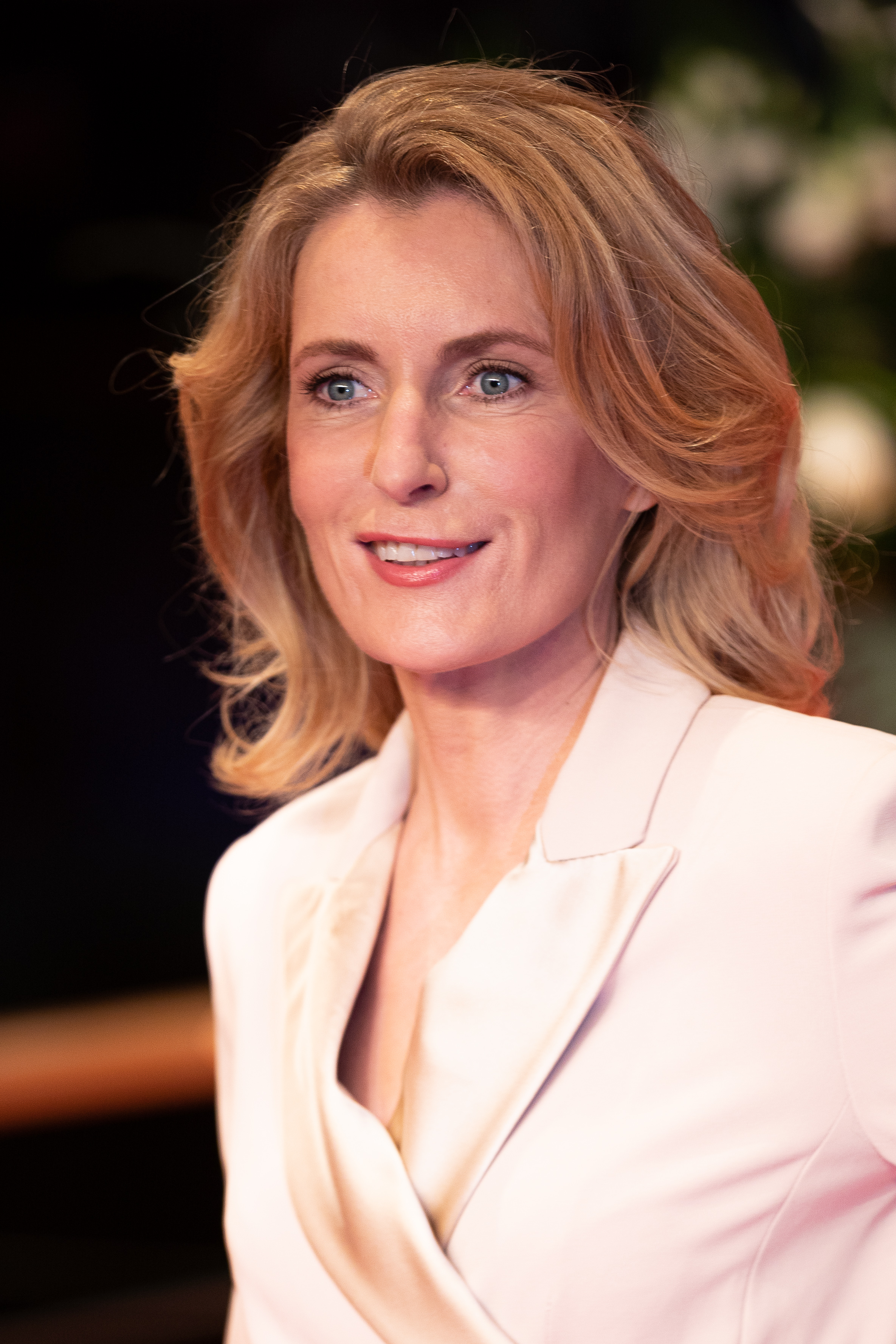
- Furtwängler in 2020
- Born: 13 September 1966 (age 59); Munich, West Germany
- Occupations: physician, actress
- Spouse: Hubert Burda (m. 1991)
- Children: 2
- Mother: Kathrin Ackermann

Maria Furtwängler-Burda (short version: German: [maˈʁiːa ˈfʊʁtvɛŋlɐ]; born 13 September 1966) is a German physician and television actress.

== Early life ==
Maria Furtwängler-Burda is a daughter of architect Bernhard Furtwängler and actress Kathrin Ackermann, great-niece and step-granddaughter of conductor Wilhelm Furtwängler, and granddaughter of politician Katharina von Kardorff-Oheimb. She has two older brothers, David and Felix. She was given her first movie role, for which she earned a bike, at the age of seven in Goodbye with Mums, produced by her uncle Florian Furtwängler. Her mother taught her acting, and she later took acting classes in Germany and other countries.

After leaving secondary school, Furtwängler studied medicine at the University of Montpellier, France, and graduated from LMU Munich in Germany. Afterwards she trained and worked as a medical doctor.

== Personal life ==
On 8 November 1991, Furtwängler married billionaire publisher Hubert Burda (born 1940), the youngest son of publishers Franz Burda and Aenne Burda, and CEO of Hubert Burda Media, an international media group which publishes over 180 magazine titles, including many fashion magazines. They have two children, Jakob (born 1990) and Elisabeth (born 1992).

== Career ==
Furtwängler began her acting career in the mid-1990s. Since then, she has acted in German television series and productions such as the Tatort series, as Hanover-based police detective Charlotte Lindholm since 2002, the successful television movies March of Millions, and Die Schicksalsjahre and cinema production The Weather Inside (Das Wetter in geschlossenen Räumen).

For her work in Tatort and March of Millions, Furtwängler was honored with Germany's most important award in the field of acting. With the movie The Weather Inside she won best actress at the 2morrow festival in Moscow; she was shortlisted in the Deutscher Filmpreis (German film prize). The film opened at the 2016 German Film Festival in New York City.

In 2022, Furtwängler chaired an independent jury that selected Edward Berger’s All Quiet on the Western Front in the race for the 95th Academy Awards in the Best International Feature Film category.

== Activism ==
Since its inception in 2005, Furtwängler has been involved in the Burda-sponsored Digital Life Design (DLD) conference series. She annually hosts a joint Burda/DLD networking reception at the World Economic Forum meeting in Davos.

In 2010 Furtwängler founded the MALISAhome in the Philippines. For the ONE Campaign, she became a goodwill ambassador for Women, Girls and Child Health. In 2015 she co-signed the ONE Campaign's open letter to Chancellor Angela Merkel and Nkosazana Dlamini-Zuma, urging them to focus on women. Also in 2015, she interviewed Merkel on development policy issues for the Chancellor's weekly podcast.

In 2013, after a meeting with Eve Ensler in Berlin, Furtwängler became more involved campaigning to end violence against women and girls in Germany. She is particularly interested in the role of the media in perpetuating harmful gender stereotypes. She has been inspired by the Geena Davis Institute and by the Women's Media Center in the US.

On International Women's Day 2016, Furtwängler supported the call of UN Women's German National Committee for a reform of the German legislation on sexual violence, based around the No Means No consent principle, which is currently not recognised in Germany. Also on International Women's Day 2016, she co-authored an op-ed with Manuela Schwesig, the German Minister for family, older people, women, and youth, highlighting the need for a stronger sexual violence law and for an end to stereotyping of women and men, particularly in the media.

== Other activities ==
=== Corporate boards ===
- Celesio, Member of the Advisory Board on Corporate Responsibility and Sustainability (since 2010)

=== Non-profit organizations ===
- Dominik Brunner Foundation, Member of the Board of Trustees
- Felix Burda Foundation, Member of the Council
- German Doctors for Developing Countries, Chairwoman of the Board of Trustees
- Hubert Burda Foundation, Member of the Board of Trustees
- MaLisa Foundation, Co-Founder and Member of the Board
- Stiftung Lesen, Ambassador

== Awards ==
- 2016 12. Festival des deutschen Films for Dramatic Art for The weather inside
- 2016 2morrow-Award
- 2013 Jupiter Award for Best TV Actress for Tatort: Wegwerfmädchen
- 2010 Karl Valentin Order
- 2010 Bavarian constitutional medal in silver
- 2009 Romy for Most Popular Cast in a Series
- 2008 DIVA-Award in the category "Best Leading Actress" for Die Flucht
- 2008 Jupiter Award for Best TV Actress in Die Flucht
- 2008 Goldene Kamera for Best Female TV Inspector (Readers Choice)
- 2007 Bavarian Order of Merit
- 2007 Goldene Henne in the category "Television – Drama"
- 2007 German Television Award for Best Actress in Tatort episodes Pauline and Das namenlose Mädchen
- 2005 Siegfried-Lowitz-Preis for Dramatic Art
- 2003 Order of Merit of the Federal Republic of Germany for her commitment in the aid organization "German Doctors"

== Filmography ==
- 2021: Confessions of Felix Krull (Director: Detlev Buck), Cinema
- 2015: The Weather Inside (Director: Isabelle Stever), Cinema
- 2015: Tatort: Spielverderber (Director: Hartmut Schoen)
- 2014: Tatort: Der sanfte Tod (Director: Alexander Adolph)
- 2012: Tatort Doppelfolge – Wegwerfmädchen/ Das goldene Band (Director: Franziska Meletzky)
- 2010: Schicksalsjahre (Director: Miguel Alexandre)
- 2008: Tatort: Salzleiche (Director: Christiane Balthasar)
- 2007: Tatort: Wem Ehre gebührt (Director: Angelina Maccarone)
- 2007: Räuber Kneißl (Director: Marcus H. Rosenmüller), Cinema
- 2007: Tatort: Das namenlose Mädchen (Director: Michael Gutmann)
- 2006: March of Millions (Die Flucht, director: Kai Wessel)
- 2005: Tatort: Pauline (Director: Niki Stein)
- 2005: Tatort: Schwarzes Herz (Director: Thomas Jauch)
- 2005: Tatort: Atemnot (Director: Thomas Jauch)
- 2004: Tatort: Märchenwald (Director: Christiane Balthasar)
- 2004: Tatort: Dunkle Wege (Director: Christiane Balthasar)
- 2003: Tatort: Sonne und Sturm (Director: Thomas Jauch)
- 2003: Tatort: Heimspiel (Director: Thomas Jauch)
- 2003: Mr. und Mrs. Right (Director: Torsten C. Fischer)
- 2002: Zu nah am Feuer (Director: Dietmar Klein)
- 2002: So fühlt sich Liebe an (Director: Peter Gersina)
- 2002: Tatort: Hexentanz (Director: René Heisig)
- 2001: Donna Leon: In Sachen Signora Brunetti (Director: Sigi Rothemund)
- 2001: Tatort: Lastrumer Mischung (Director: Thomas Jauch)
- 2000: Das Glück ist eine Insel (Director: Gloria Behrens)
- 1999: Die achte Todsünde: Gespensterjagd (Director: Stephan Meyer)
- 1999: Dir zu Liebe (Director: Hans Werner)
- 1999: Siska – Mord frei Haus (Director: Hans-Jürgen Tögel)
- 1998: Kap der guten Hoffnung (Director: Vera Loebner)
- 1998: Der Fahnder (Director: Peter Adam)
- 1997: Kap der guten Hoffnung (Director: Hans Werner)
- 1997: Herzflimmern (Director: Dieter Kehler)
- 1996: Das Haus an der Küste (Director: Dieter Kehler)
- 1996: Herz über Kopf (Director: Hans-Jürgen Tögel)
- 1994: Drei Frauen und (k)ein Mann (Director: Hans-Jürgen Tögel)
- 1986/90: Die glückliche Familie (Director: Nikolai Müllerschön u.a.)
- 1974: Goodbye with Mums (Director: Florian Furtwängler), Cinema
