= Aenne Burda =

German magazine publisher

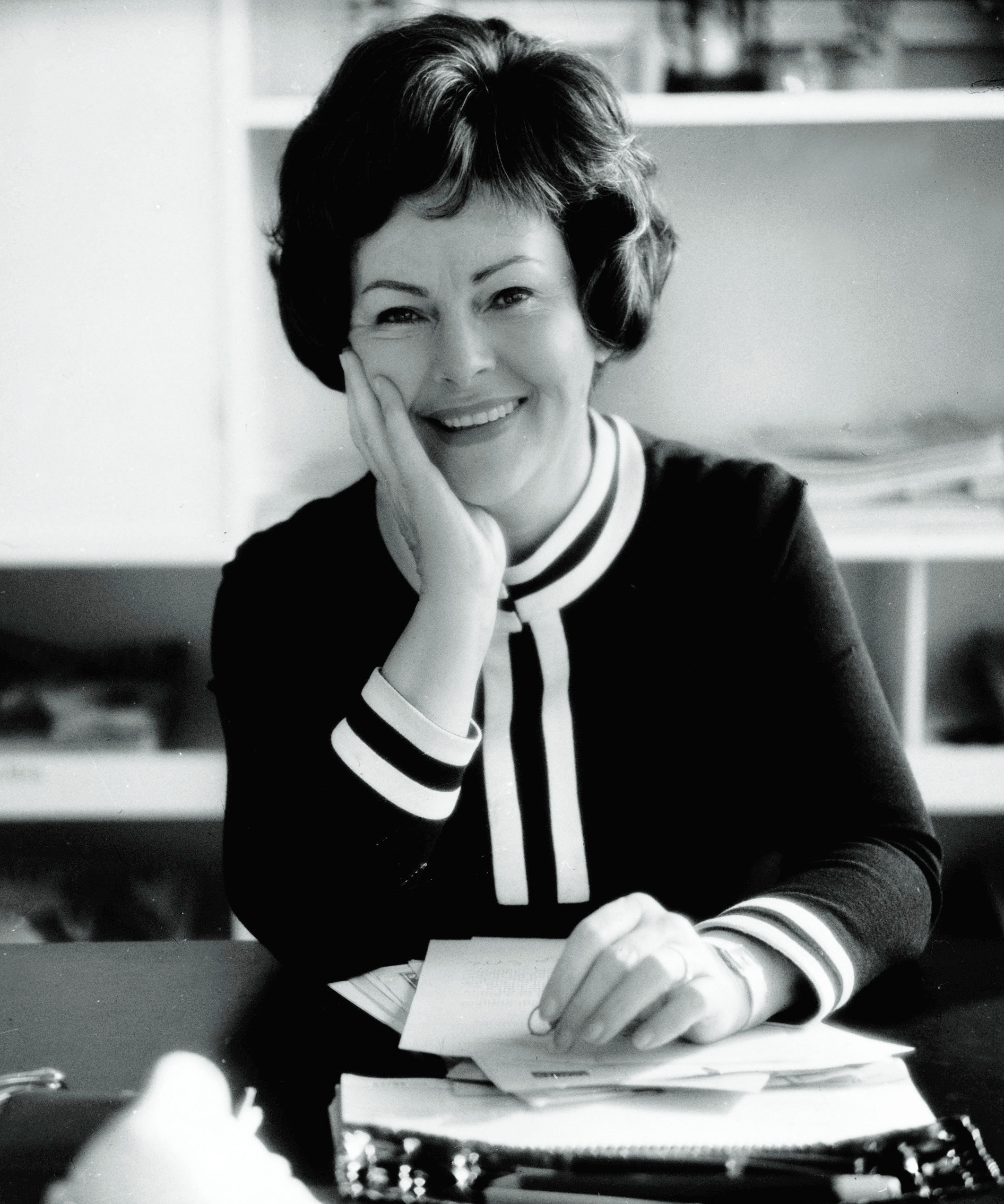
- Born: Anna Magdalene Lemminger; 28 July 1909; Offenburg, German Empire
- Died: 3 November 2005 (aged 96); Offenburg, Germany
- Occupation: Publisher
- Known for: Burda fashion magazines
- Spouse: Franz Burda II (died 1986)
- Children: Franz Burda junior (1932–2017); Frieder Burda (1936–2019); Hubert Burda (1940)
- Website: http://www.aenne-burda.com/

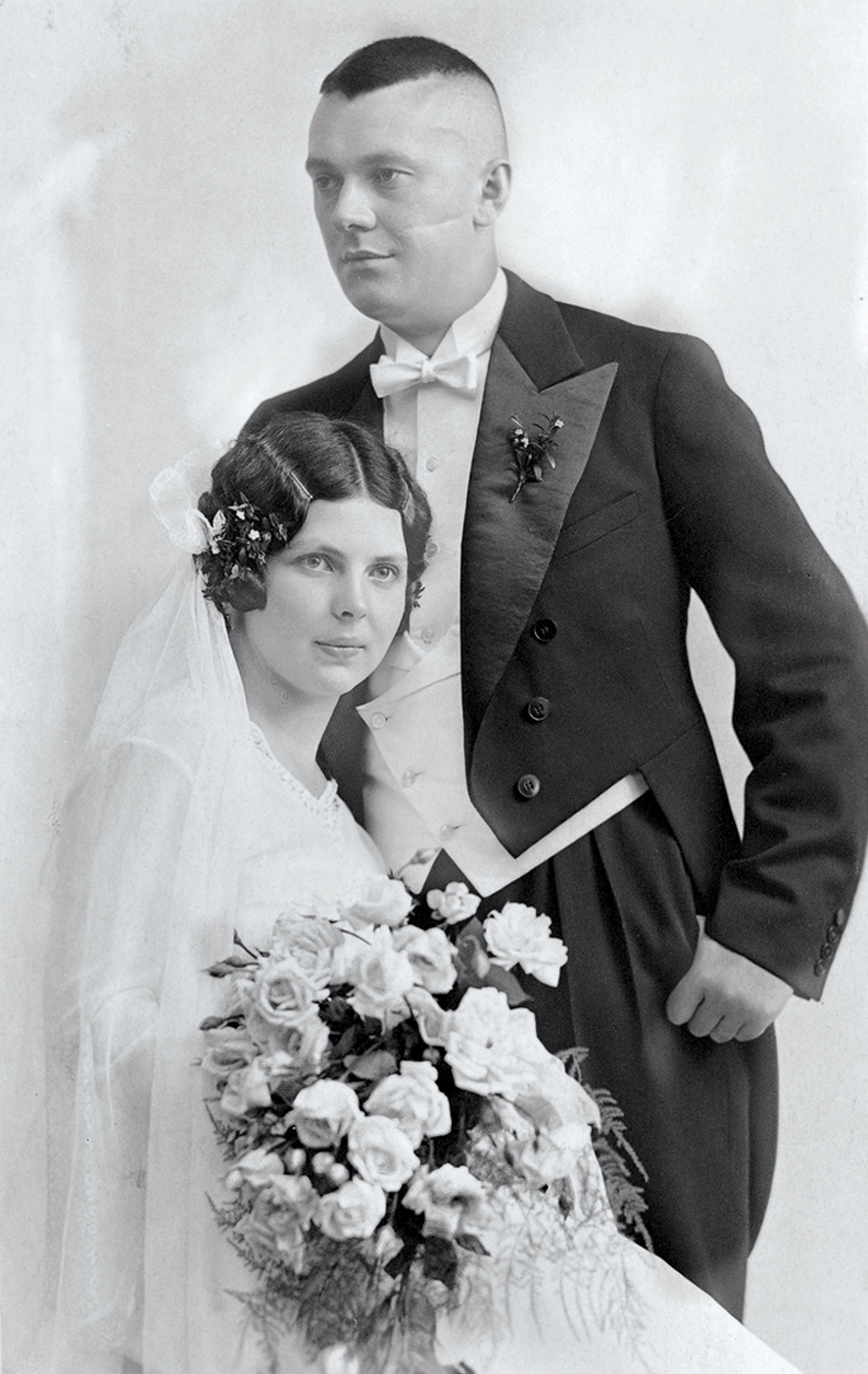
Aenne & Franz Burda in 1931

Aenne Burda (28 July 1909 – 3 November 2005), born Anna Magdalene Lemminger, was a German publisher of the Burda Group, a media group based in Offenburg and Munich, Germany. She was one of the symbols of the German economic miracle.

== Biography ==
Aenne Burda was born in Offenburg, German Empire. She chose her name after the popular song Ännchen von Tharau. She was the daughter of a steam engine fireman. She left convent high school at 17 and became a cashier at the Offenburg electricity company. In 1930 she met printer and publisher Franz Burda, son of Franz Burda, the founder of the Burda printing company. The couple married a year later, on 9 July 1931. They had three sons, Franz (1932–2017), Frieder (1936–2019) and Hubert (1940). She was the mother-in-law of actress Maria Furtwängler.

Burda founded two charitable foundations, supporting young academics and seniors in her hometown of Offenburg respectively.

Aenne Burda died in her native Offenburg, Germany, at the age of 96, from natural causes.

A movie about her life, Aenne Burda, The Economic Wonderwoman was released in 2018.

== Magazine publishing ==
Aenne and her husband helped to expand the family business into women's magazines. In 1949 Aenne Burda founded a fashion magazine printing and publishing company in her home town Offenburg. The same year she started publishing magazine Favorit, which was later renamed to Burda Moden. The first issue of Burda Moden magazine was published in 1950 with a circulation of 100,000. It became popular in the market after 1952, when it began to include sheets of paper with patterns for clothes. In 1987 Burda Moden became the first Western magazine published in Soviet Union. Burda Fashion is currently published in 90 countries in 16 different languages.

In 1977 she launched Burda CARINA magazine, a fashion and lifestyle magazine targeting a younger female audience.

== Quotes ==
- "My aim is to put together practical fashions at an affordable price that can be worn by the largest possible number of women."
- "I have learned to grow old with a young heart, thus retaining my enjoyment of life, my joie de vivre."

== Awards ==
- 1974 Great Cross of Merit of the Federal Republic of Germany
- 1979 Offenburg's Ring of Honour for her role in the city's economic development
- 1984 Bavarian Order of Merit
- 1985 Baden-Württemberg Order of Merit
- 1989 Jakob Fugger Medal by the Bavarian Publishers Association (the first time this was awarded to a woman)
- 1989 Aenne Burda is made an honorary citizen of her hometown Offenburg
- 1990 Karl Valentin Order of Merit
- 1994 Golden Order of Merit from the province of Salzburg, Austria
- 2001 Knight Commander's Cross of the Order of Merit of the Federal Republic of Germany for her exceptional achievements as a business woman

== Bibliography ==
- Aenne Burda: Ansichten, Einsichten, Erfahrungen. Articles previously published in Burda Moden, 1975–1989, ISBN 3-88978-039-3
- Aenne Burda (Hrsg.): Handarbeitsbücher für Schule, Beruf und Haus. Modeverlag Burda, Lahr (Schwarzwald)
- Judith Betzler: Aenne Burda. Die Macht des Schönen. Econ, München 1999, ISBN 3-430-11194-3
  – Excerpt, 22 pages, (pdf file)
- Peter Köpf: Die Burdas. Europa Verlag, Hamburg 2002, ISBN 3-203-79145-5
