= Franz Burda =

German publisher (1903–1986)

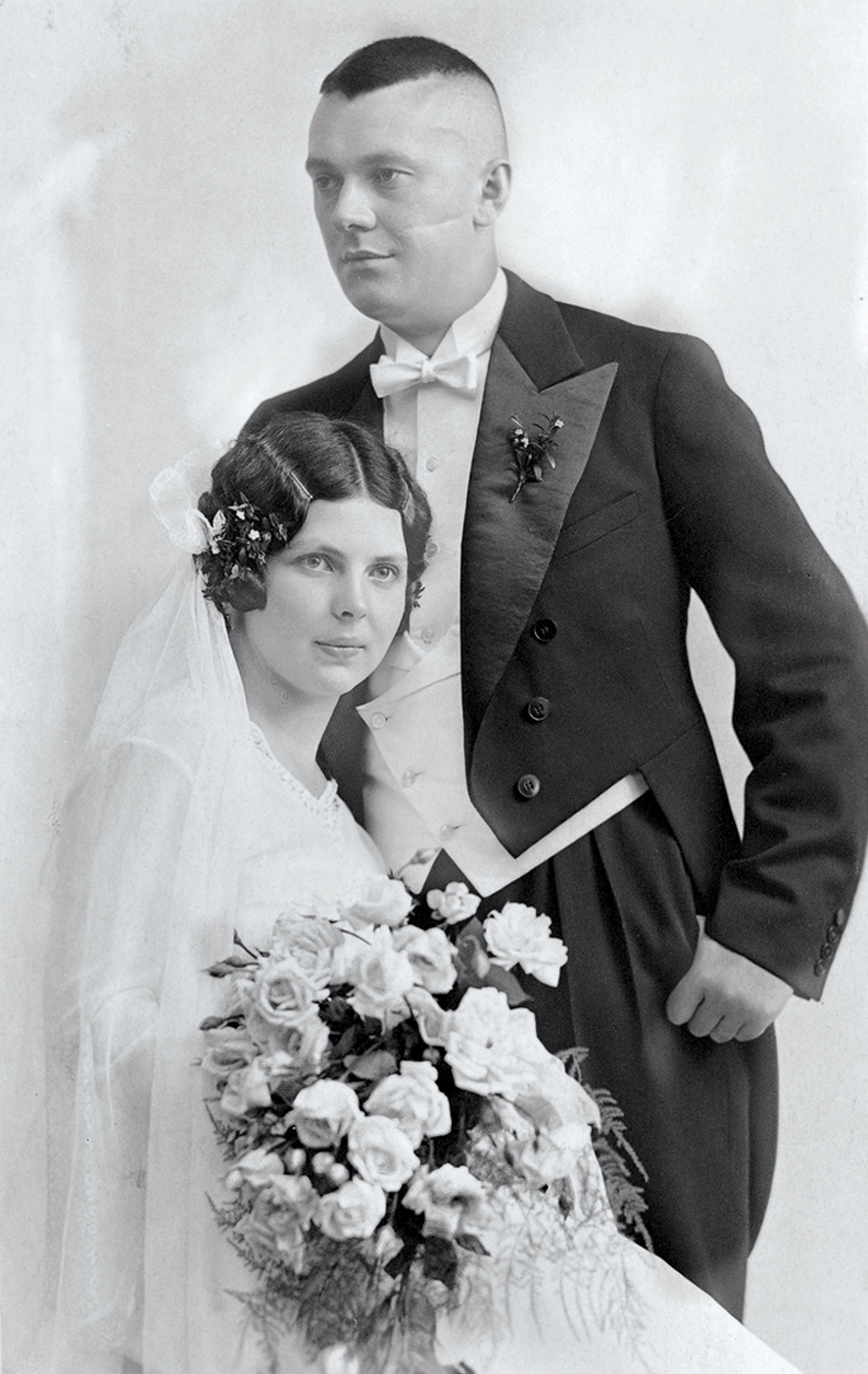
Aenne Burda and Franz Burda (1931). Franz Burda's duelling scar is visible.

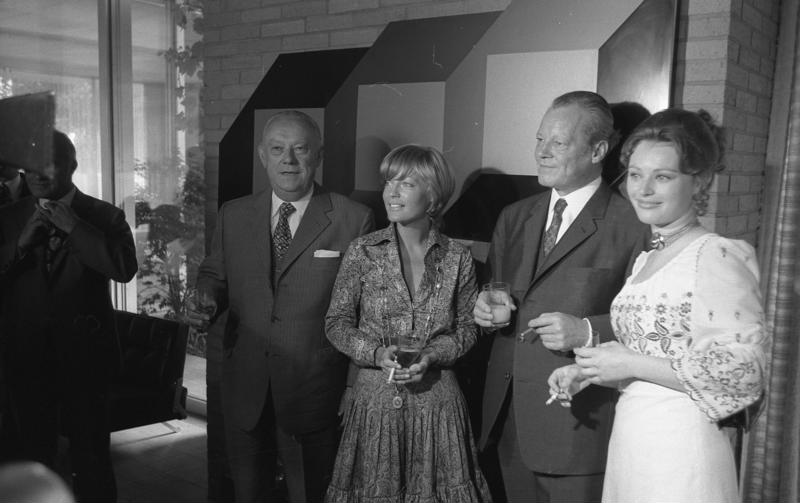
Franz Burda (left) with Romy Schneider, Willy Brandt and Ilona Grübel (1971)

Franz Burda (24 February 1903 – 30 September 1986) was a German publisher. He inherited his father's publishing business, which he developed into what is now the Hubert Burda Media conglomerate.

== Early life and family ==
Burda was born in Philippsburg. He received his doctorate in 1927, at the University of Erlangen with an economic history of the development work of the Baden-products markets. He married fashion publisher Aenne Burda ne Lemminger on 9 July 1931 and was the father of three sons, Franz, the art collector Frieder, and Hubert, the heir to the publishing empire.

== Business during World War II ==
From 1934 to 1937, Burda was a member of the paramilitary National Socialist Motor Corps. His biographer has characterised his involvement with Nazism as essentially commercial and pragmatic, rather than ideological. In 1933 he stated publicly that his business did not have any Jewish employees or co-owners, although he would have privately known that statement to be untrue, having intervened on behalf of the Jewish wife of one of his employees.

He developed his family's small printing business into a large media conglomerate. He benefited from "Aryanization" of Jewish property by the Nazi government when in 1938 Burda and partners acquired Großdruckerei, Papiergroßhandlung und Papierwarenwerk Akademiestraße Gebrüder Bauer in Mannheim. Its owner Berthold Reiss and fellow shareholders were Jews, and so they were forced to sell the business under Nazi "Aryanization" laws.

After the acquisition, Burda invited Reiss to stay on at the company to help manage the transition. Reiss’s son Hans would later write that the pair established a good working relationship, despite the circumstances of the acquisition. Burda interjected on Reiss' behalf when the latter was interned as part of Kristallnacht. The Burda and Reiss families developed a friendship after 1945.

Burda avoided military service himself by obtaining a contract printing maps for the military and using his connections. His antisemitic views were also alleged in the 1950s.

== Postwar era ==
After 1945, Burda was allowed to publish again. For the French occupation authorities, he printed stamps and school books. In 1948, against the will of many French officers, he managed to bring on the market the magazine Das Ufer ('The shore' or 'The river bank'), the forerunner of the popular magazine later called Bunte. It helped him that he was friends with a particular officer, Raymond Schmittlein, the press chief of the zone, who arranged for the license to be issued in the name of a female friend of Schmittlein's – a 'straw woman,' as it were.

Burda died in Offenburg at the age of 83 after relinquishing control of Hubert Burda Media to his three sons.
