= Hubert Burda Media =

German media group

Hubert Burda Media Holding Kommanditgesellschaft

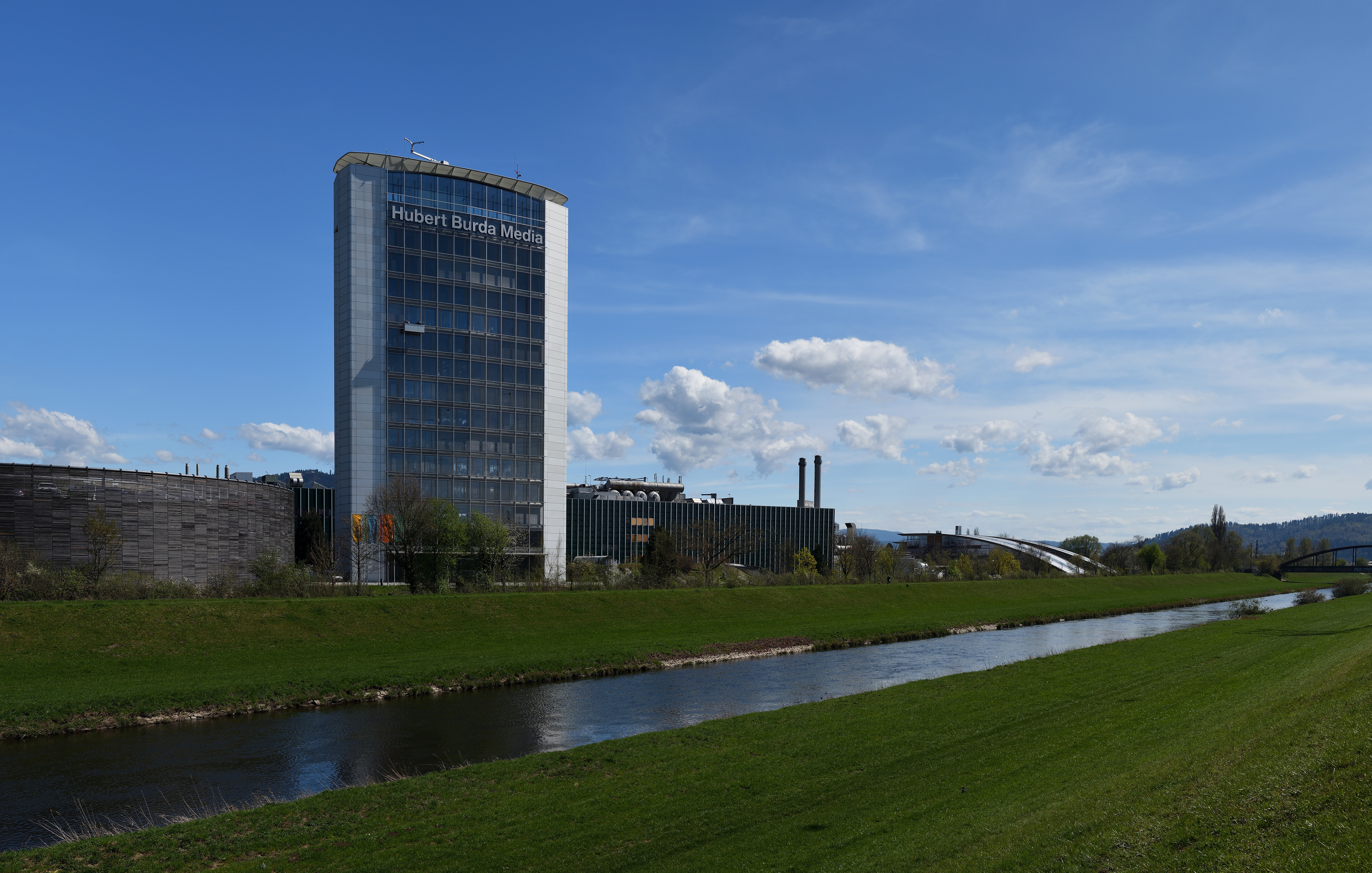
- Corporate headquarters in Offenburg
- Trade name: Hubert Burda Media
- Type: Private (Kommanditgesellschaft)
- Industry: Media, publishing
- Founded: 1903; 123 years ago
- Headquarters: Offenburg, Germany
- Key people: Hubert Burda (publisher, general partner); Paul-Bernhard Kallen (chief executive officer)
- Revenue: ▼€2.748 billion (2023)
- Number of employees: ▼ ~10,000 (2023)
- Subsidiaries: Immediate Media Company
- Website: www.burda.com

Hubert Burda Media Holding is a German media group with headquarters in Offenburg. It originated as a small printing business, founded by Franz Burda Snr in Philippsburg, in 1903.

In 1986, the corporate group was divided up between Franz Jnr, Frieder and Hubert Burda. In the 1980s and 1990s, the company developed into a major corporation; it is now one of Germany's largest media companies. Its best-known media brands include the magazines Bunte and Superillu, the German edition of Playboy, the news magazine Focus, as well as HuffPost Germany, HolidayCheck and XING. The company also owned Immediate Media, a British magazine publishing company.

== History ==
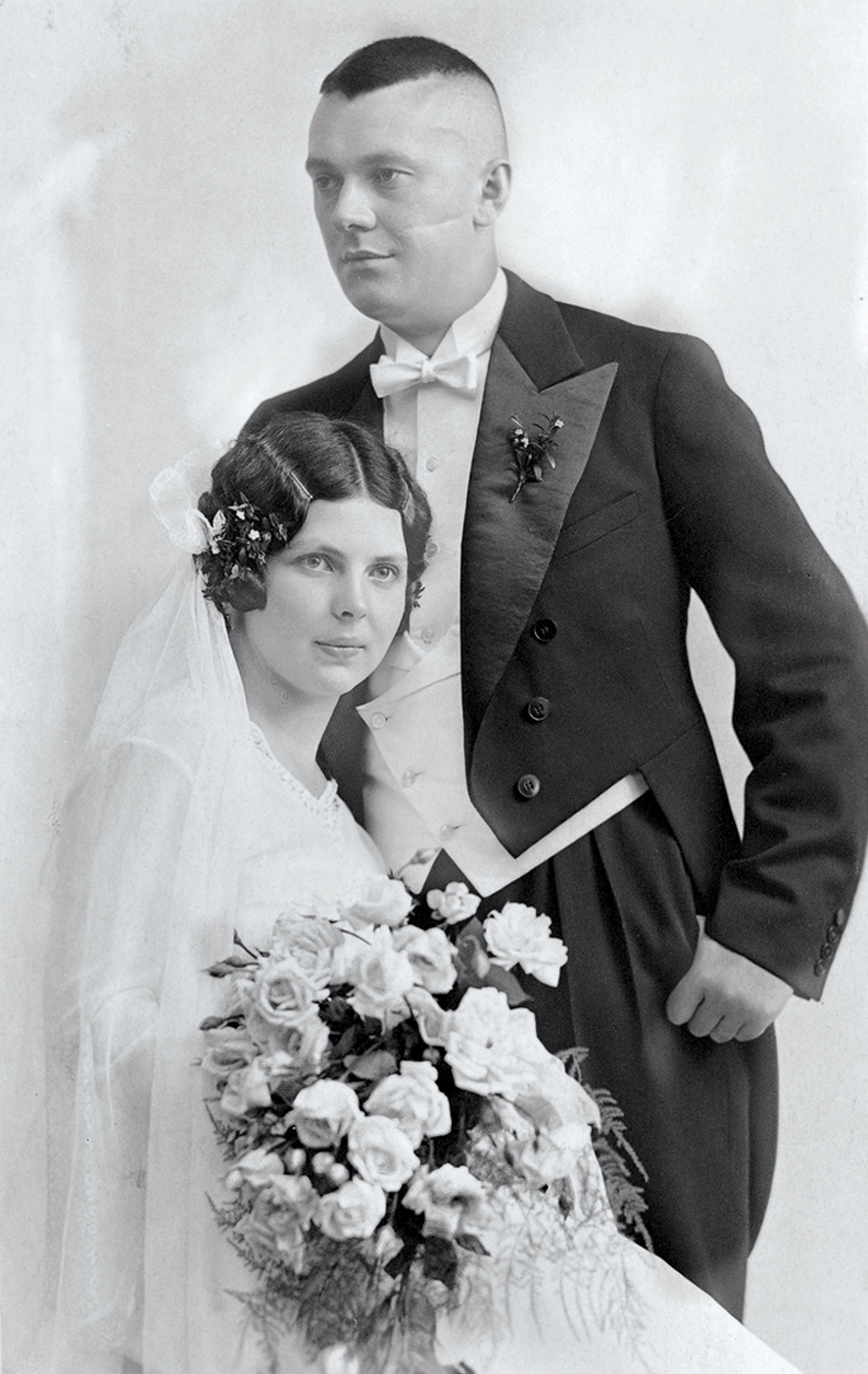
Wedding photo of Aenne and Franz Burda Sr (1931)

=== Founded as a printing company ===
From 1903, Franz Burda ("I"), the father of Franz Burda Sr ("II") and grandfather of Franz Burda Jr ("III") ran a small printing business in Philippsburg. The venture was largely unsuccessful, prompting Burda to start a new company in Offenburg, in 1908.

In 1927, the company produced Germany's first radio listings magazine, "Die Sürag", (subtitle "The Large Radio Magazine"). Its name sounded like a short form of Süddeutscher Rundfunk. Its initial circulation was 3,000 copies. In 1929, Franz Burda Sr took over the business from his father, along with the editorial duties for Sürag. He expanded the business significantly. In the early 1930s, the magazine achieved a circulation of over 85,000, and the staff grew from three to roughly 100. A second and larger phase of growth began in 1934, with the acquisition and development of new printing operations and the conversion to gravure printing.

=== Business during the Nazi regime ===
In 1938 Franz Burda and partners acquired a major printing facility, Großdruckerei, Papiergroßhandlung und Papierwarenwerk Akademiestraße Gebrüder Bauer in Mannheim. It was one of the largest and most modern printing companies in the German Reich, with some 250 employees. Its owner Berthold Reiss and fellow shareholders were Jews, meaning that they were forced to sell the business under the "Aryanization" laws relating to all Jewish-owned businesses in Nazi Germany.

As a forced seller, Berthold Reiss was obliged to find a buyer for the firm or face the appropriation of its assets and his personal destitution. Reiss pitched unsuccessfully to several potential buyers before a mutual contact told him of Franz Burda's interest. At the time Burda did not have sufficient capital to buy the business outright, so he paired with Karl Fritz, owner of Südwestdruck. One of Fritz's contacts, Robert Wagner, had the high-level political and banking contacts necessary to approve the deal and secure finance for the acquisition.

After the acquisition, Burda invited Reiss to stay on at the company to help manage the transition of ownership. Reiss's son Hans would later write that the pair established a good working relationship, despite the circumstances of the acquisition, with Reiss mentoring Burda's transition to managing a much larger business and Burda enjoying the firm's more informal culture. Burda interjected on Reiss' behalf when the latter was interned as part of Kristallnacht. The Burda and Reiss families developed a friendship after 1945, with Hans Reiss contributing to later Burda projects.

Despite his cordial relationship with Reiss, Franz Burda was a member of the Nazi Party from 1938 onwards. In 1933 he declared that his company had no Jewish employees or shareholders, although, preceding this statement in Sürag, advertisers of the National Socialist program guides NS-Funk and Der Deutsche Sender had claimed Burda did employ Jews. In reality, Burda knowingly employed a Jewish woman and rejected calls for her dismissal; this may explain why the company was never designated a "model National Socialist company". Burda also intervened against the deportation of an employee's Jewish wife, which led to Burda being reported to the Gestapo. An unauthorised biography of the family, Die Burdas, characterised Franz's membership of the Nazi party as more financial expediency than political ideology. In later official hearings Franz was held to be a Mitläufer, referring to those who were not charged with Nazi crimes but whose involvement with the Party was such that they could not be wholly exonerated.

Franz's son Hubert went on to assume a significant role in the issue of German industrial reparations, for which he was decorated by a number of German Jewish interest groups, including the Ohel Jacob Medal award. The publishing company's history during the Third Reich was described by Salomon Korn, a former Vice President of the Central Council of Jews in Germany, as a "case study for coming generations as to the question of guilt and conscience, of entanglement and dealing with the burden of this legacy".

At the beginning of World War II, Burda had a staff of roughly 600 employees. In 1941, production of the magazine "Die Sürag" was curtailed due to the war, and instead the company printed maps for the High Command of the German Army and aerial photographs for the Luftwaffe, in multi-color gravure printing. The map of Cherkasy from the Cartographical Studio Dr. Franz Burda was considered the world's first multi-colour gravure printed map. The Mannheim plant was destroyed by bombing; its operations moved to Lahr-Dinglingen in 1943.

=== After World War II ===
In the aftermath of the war, Franz Burda Sr single-handedly reached an agreement to pay reparations to the survivors and descendants of the shareholders from the Mannheim Bauer Printing Press. The company Gebr. Bauer oHG was later deleted from the commercial register and subsequently run as a Burda company. From 1945, the company printed schoolbooks and postage stamps for the French occupation zone, as well as the French military newspaper "Revue d'Information". After Franz Burda Sr received the order from the French authorities to publish a magazine, the illustrated newspaper "Das Ufer", was first published in 1948, a precursor of the "Bunte" ("Bunte Illustrierte"), against the opposition of many French officers. The license for "Das Ufer" was issued under the name of a front woman. At that time, the French occupation forces still compiled the editorial section of the magazine.

Aenne Burda, the wife of Franz Burda Sr, built up the A. Burda fashion publishing house after the War. Its key publication, Burda Moden, a magazine for sewing patterns, was launched in 1950 (a precursor named of "Favorit" was launched in 1949). Circulation grew rapidly from 100,000 at launch to roughly half a million copies. Aenne Burda developed into by far the largest customer of the printing operations of her husband, who had no authority in her company. She only granted a participating share to her children as limited partners. In 1954, Aenne Burda's company moved into new headquarters in Kestendamm in Offenburg, designed by the architect Egon Eiermann. From 1954/55, advertising for Burda publications was seen on the so-called "Burda Fleet", three Piper PA-18 airplanes with banners flying behind the tail.

=== Expansion through takeovers ===
The company built up its presence in the Bavarian capital of Munich, which in addition to Offenburg became the company's second headquarters. In 1961, the printing press in Offenburg was converted to modern rotogravure printing presses. the same year saw the inauguration of the 50m high Burda Tower, which became a symbol of the city. Already in the 1950s, a smokestack of the printing operations served as an observation point with an elevator and a terrace restaurant. In 1962, Burda acquired the majority of the Neue Verlags-Gesellschaft publishing company based in Karlsruhe, known for magazines such as "Freundin" and "Film Revue". At the end of the 1940s, Marie-Pierre Kœnig, Commander-in-chief of the French Army in Germany and Military Governor of the French Occupation Zone, was head of the publishing house. In 1953, Karl Fritz, who together with Burda had acquired the Bauer Printing Press in 1938, then purchased the Neue Verlags-Gesellschaft. In 1962, Burda bought the Bambi film prize. In 1963, Burda acquired the traditional "Frankfurter Illustrierte", which was also integrated into "Bunte". From then on, the publication was called "Bunte Münchner Frankfurter Illustrierte".

=== Hubert Burda joins the firm ===
In 1966, Hubert Burda joined the company. After he obtained a Ph.D. in Art History and completing various traineeships, Franz Burda initially put his son in charge of the Munich publishing house. The men's magazine "M", launched at the end of the 1960s with a million-DM advertising budget, was discontinued by Burda after 12 editions and extensive losses. In 1973, Franz Burda Sr largely retired from the business: he made his children, Franz Jr, Frieder and Hubert into managing shareholders. Franz Burda Jr was responsible for the printing operations, while Frieder handled finances and administration and Hubert managed publishing activities. Hubert also worked as editor for "Bunte", first as managing editor, advancing to editor-in-chief in 1976. Influenced by Andy Warhol, he led the evolution of the publication from a traditional magazine to a modern popular magazine ("people magazine"). In 1983, the "Bunte" editorial staff moved from Offenburg to Munich, to the newly built headquarters of the Burda Verlag at Arabellapark, where the company still has an office.

=== Company Division ===
After numerous mergers and acquisitions, the printing and publishing operations evolved into a large corporate group, which was re-organized in 1986 and after the death of Franz Burda Sr. The brothers, Franz and Frieder, took over all affiliate shares, including those in US printing houses, German paper factories and Austrian media distribution. The most lucrative were the shares in the Berlin-based publisher Axel Springer, which distributed dividends in the millions. Burda had previously acquired a stake of 24.9% in Axel Springer, in 1983. Franz and Frieder bundled their shareholdings in F+F Burda KG based in Baden-Baden. Hubert Burda became the sole shareholder of Burda GmbH with headquarters in Offenburg, bundling all German printing and publishing activities. By separating the operating business from the shareholding in Axel Springer, the owners averted anti-trust issues. As a result, Franz Burda Jr and Frieder Burda were able to increase their equity into a blocking minority. In 1988, they suddenly sold their shares again to the heirs of Axel Springer, having sought a majority in Axel Springer alongside Leo Kirch; Hubert Burda challenged the legality of the transaction, asserting a preemptory right of purchase for the Springer shares. He lost the subsequent court case.

=== Development into a media group ===
At the time of the legal dispute with his brothers, revenues at Hubert Burda's publishing house went into decline before improving at the end of the 1980s, particularly after the circulation of "Bunte" rallied again. Further growth came after expansion to the east: In 1987, "Burda Moden" was the first Western magazine sold in the Soviet Union. After German Reunification, Burda initiated "Superillu" in cooperation with Gong Verlag. It was conceived as "integration and lifestyle assistance as East and West grow together" and became one of the best-selling magazines in the new German states. By contrast, the East German tabloid, "Super!", launched in 1992, was a failure. In order to compensate for the losses incurred, Burda was obliged to sell the headquarters at Arabellapark. Further success came with the launch of "Focus." Established in 1993 by Hubert Burda and Helmut Markwort, the magazine had 15,000 subscribers after five editions and reached a circulation of 300,000 sold copies. Its advertising revenues would go on to surpass "Der Spiegel". "Focus" was key to the development of the Burda publishing house into a media corporation.

With the retirement of Aenne Burda in 1994, Hubert Burda purchased all the shares of the remaining family members and thus became the sole owner of the publishing house. It was integrated into the Group but remained largely independent. At the turn of the year 1994/1995, Burda consolidated its radio and TV shares and integrated them into the current profit centre structure. The Group also took on a greater international focus by establishing foreign subsidiaries.

=== Investments in digital activities ===
From 1995, Burda increased its investment in digital business models, creating a separate division for the purpose. As one of its first steps, the new division took a stake in Europa Online, a Luxembourg online service. "Focus Online" was launched in 1996, representing the first editorial news service from Burda, and additional such websites followed. Europa Online proved to be unsuccessful, but Burda continued its expansion on the Internet. In 2000, the Group consolidated its digital businesses in Focus Digital AG, which merged with Tomorrow Internet AG to become what was at the time the largest Internet group. To more accurately reflect the change in business, the company changed its name at the end of the 1990s to "Hubert Burda Media". A corresponding sign was also installed at the Burda Media Park in Offenburg, which opened in 2000: The new building was located on the site of the former Kinzig Stadium. The Burda School of Journalism moved there in 2001.

In 2000, total operating performance of Hubert Burda Media exceeded 3 billion Deutsche Mark for the first time.

In 2005, Hubert Burda Media initiated the international conference and innovation platform Digital Life Design (DLD). It gathers leading innovators, Internet investors and companies to Munich. In 2007, the Group took over the remaining shares in the Vogel Burda joint venture, which, among others, owns the computer magazine "Chip" and the technology portal "Chip Online". In 2009, Burda invested in XING with an initial purchase of 25.1% of the shares, before assuming a majority shareholding three years later.

=== Handover of operative management ===
On his 70th birthday, Hubert Burda announced his retirement from the operating business. At the turn of the year 2009/10, Paul-Bernhard Kallen was appointed as new CEO of the Group, with Hubert Burda remaining publisher and managing shareholder. Observers in turn viewed the appointment as a strengthening of the digital side of the business. Under Kallen's leadership the subsidiary Tomorrow Focus started up a German-language version of the news and discussion platform "HuffPost".

In 2013 Hubert Burda Media acquired a majority in the web browser "Cliqz", in which the Mozilla Foundation also later invested. In 2016, a group subsidiary started "Thunder", an open-source content management system that is also open to other media companies.

== Group structure ==
Hubert Burda Media is organized in a decentralized profit center structure. The subsidiaries operate largely independently, while some functions (such as procurement) are handled centrally.

The consolidation of the Group in 2015 comprised a total of 233 companies, of which 140 were headquartered in Germany. The holding company of the Group is Hubert Burda Media Holding Kommanditgesellschaft. The personally liable shareholders (general partners) of the company are Hubert Burda and a Management GmbH, which in turn is 100% owned by the holding company. The limited partners of the company are the Burda Betriebsführungsgesellschaft as well as Hubert Burda's two children. Elisabeth and Jacob Burda were given a share in the Group for the first time at the end of 2010. The executive management of the Group reports to a Management Board comprising five persons. The CEO of the management body is Paul-Bernhard Kallen, who in 2010 was the first manager from outside the family to assume the position. Holger Eckstein is the CFO, Andreas Rittstieg is responsible for Legal Affairs and Compliance. Philipp Welte is responsible for national media brands and Stefan Winners the national digital brands.

The company splits out its revenue reporting across five divisional categories: National Digital Brands, National Media Brands, International Media Brands, Print and Other.

== Financial ==
HUBERT BURDA MEDIA
Year	Revenue in bn.€	%	Employees
2018	2.664	–0.3	12,369

The firm's National Digital Media division is its largest and fastest-growing unit. In 2018 it recorded a 5% increase in sales to €1.47bn, accounting for 55% of the company's entire turnover.

== Media and digital brands ==
Hubert Burda Media owns magazines, websites, TV and radio broadcasters, including Radio Times and over 70 other magazines. It also acquired Immediate Media from its private equity owner Exponent and Management, for £270m. The Group also owns various mail order and service and marketing firms.

The Commission on Concentration in the Media (KEK) lists over 200 majority or minority shareholdings for Germany alone. The Group and its publishers are considered leaders in the media industry in terms of the development of digital business models. Hubert Burda Media earns more than half its revenues in this area.

In 2018 the company reported, roughly 600 media products released in Germany and 18 other countries. The key divisions of the Group are Blue Ocean Entertainment, BCN, BurdaDirect, BurdaDruck, BurdaForward, BurdaHome, BurdaInternational, BurdaLife, BurdaNews, BurdaPrincipal Investments, BurdaServices, BurdaStudios, BurdaStyle, BurdaTech, C3 Creative Code and Content, HolidayCheck Group and XING. The divisions operate largely independently as profit centers.

Well known media and digital brands of Hubert Burda Media include:

=== Bunte ===

Bunte is a German-language people magazine. It was first published in 1948 under the name "Das Ufer". Under Hubert Burda, Bunte developed into a modern popular magazine. Today, Bunte has one of the highest circulations of all German publications and is one of the most popular media brands in the Group. After Patricia Riekel stepped down, Robert Pölzer took over the position of editor-in-chief.

=== Chip ===

Chip was established by Kurt Eckernkamp in 1978 as the first German-language computer magazine. The publication developed into the market leader in that segment, measured in terms of circulation. The success of Chip was also facilitated by the expansion into over a dozen other countries. Since 2007, Chip has been a fully owned subsidiary of Hubert Burda Media. The acting editor-in-chief is Josef Reitberger.

Another digital brand of Hubert Burda Media is Chip Online, one of the largest German-language editorial websites.

=== Cliqz ===
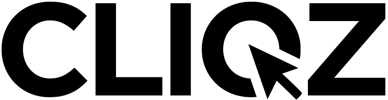

Cliqz is a web browser with an integrated search engine, unveiled in 2015. It stands out in particular thanks to its search function without traditional search results pages and tracking protection. Cliqz supports Windows, macOS, Linux, iOS and Android operating systems. In 2016, the Mozilla Foundation invested in Cliqz.

=== Cyberport ===

Cyberport is an electronics retailer, established in 1998. The company sells notebooks, tablets, smartphones and other devices, both online and in its own outlets. In the year 2000, the Group increased its stake to acquire a majority in the firm.

=== Digital Life Design ===
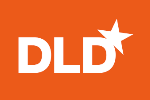

Digital Life Design (or DLD for short) is the international conference and innovation platform of Hubert Burda Media. It was launched in 2005 as "Digital Lifestyle Day". In the years that followed, DLD developed into a significant event in the Internet and media sector. It is known for attracting the participation of representatives from large US groups.

=== Focus ===
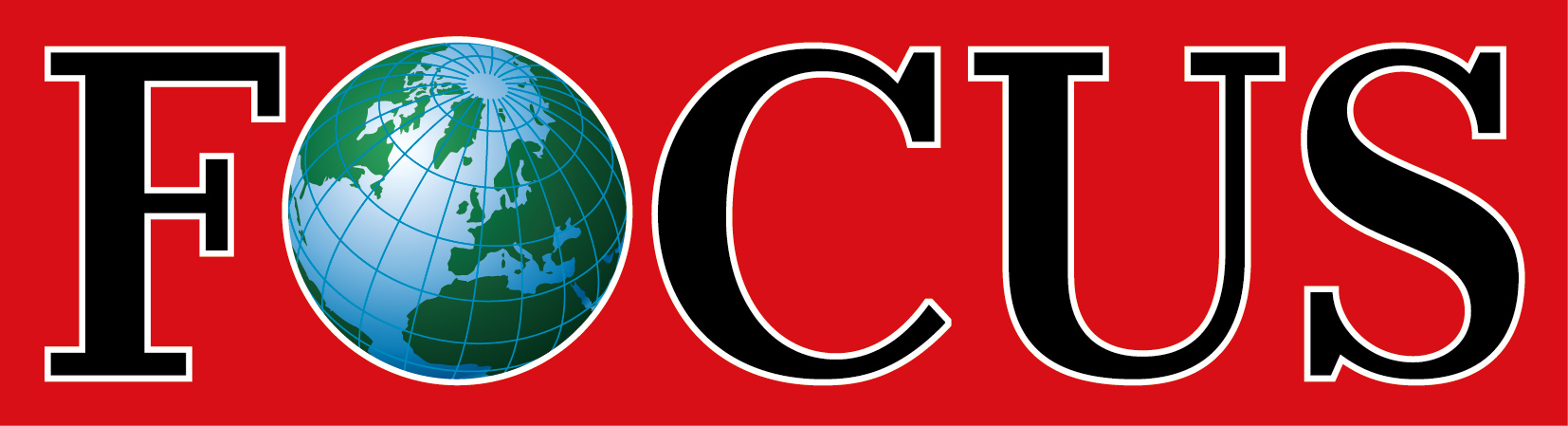

Focus is a German-language news magazine. It was established in 1993 as an alternative to Der Spiegel. Today, Focus is one of the three most widely circulated German weeklies. The concept originates from publisher Hubert Burda and founding editor-in-chief Helmut Markwort, assisted by Uli Baur. Robert Schneider has been editor-in-chief since March 1, 2016.

Its website, Focus Online, is one of the highest-profile German-language websites.

=== Freizeit Revue ===
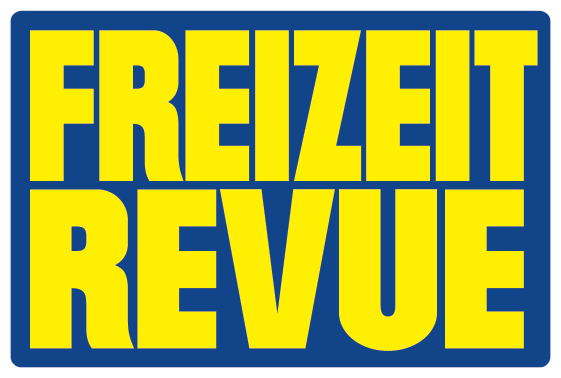

Freizeit Revue is a German-language tabloid magazine. The first edition appeared in 1970. It carries content on celebrities, crossword puzzles and practical tips. It is one of the most widely circulated and most profitable publications in the Group. The editor-in-chief of Freizeit Revue is Kai Winckler.

=== HolidayCheck Group ===
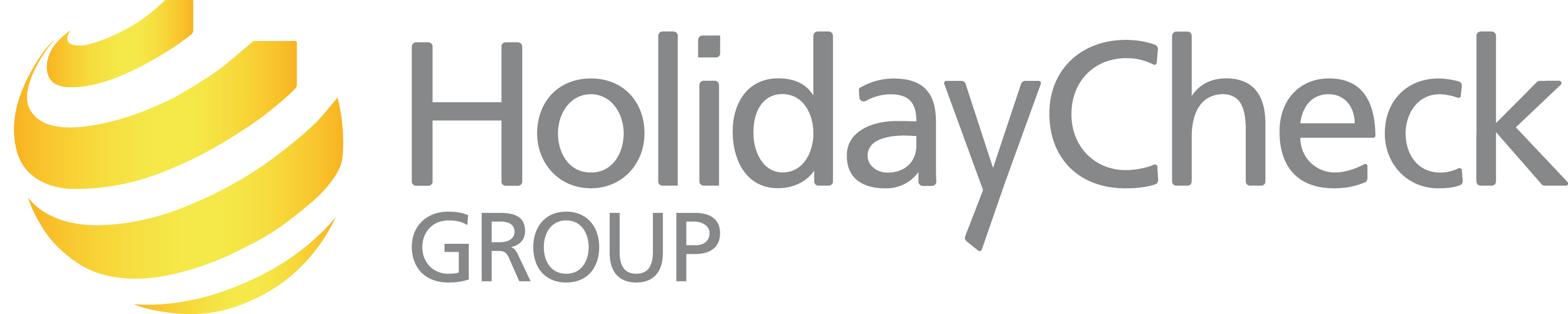

Hubert Burda Media's worldwide travel and review portals are bundled under the HolidayCheck Group. HolidayCheck is among the leading websites of this kind in Germany, measured in terms of brokered revenues. The publicly listed HolidayCheck Group previously went by the name Tomorrow Focus, after the merger of Tomorrow with Focus Digital.

=== InStyle ===
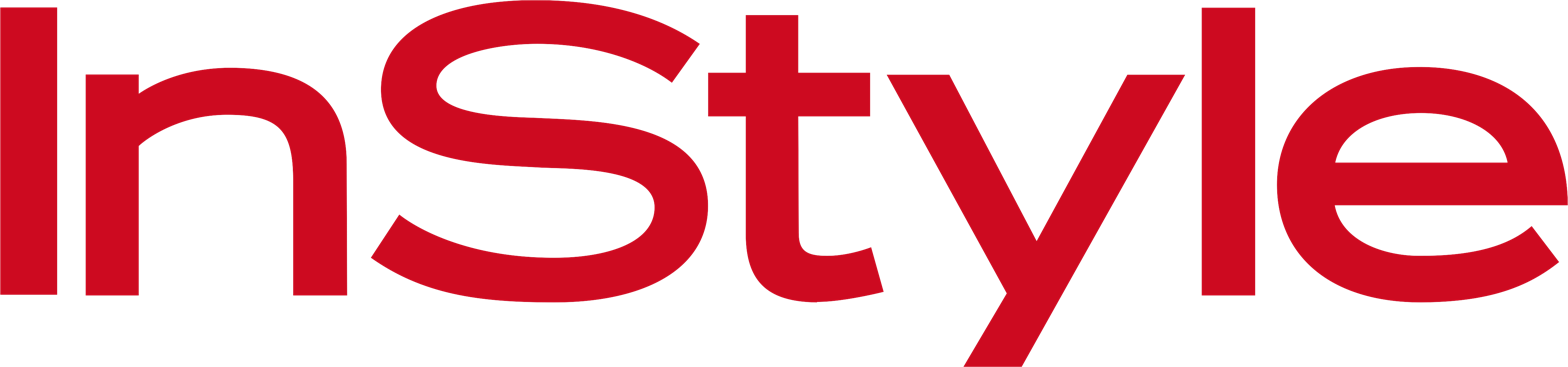

In 1998, Hubert Burda Media launched the German-language woman's magazine InStyle, licensing the product from US Time Inc. publishing company. InStyle reports on the fashion and lifestyle of celebrities and style icons. It is geared towards younger women readers. The editor-in-chief of InStyle is Kerstin Weng.

=== Superillu ===

The Burda Group established the German-language magazine Superillu after German Reunification especially for the East German market. The publication grew into the most widely read magazine. Die Zeit thus referred to Superillu as the "Mouthpiece of the East". The magazine contains regional interest stories, but has evolved over the years to include broader-based family content. Stefan Kobus is editor-in-chief.

=== XING ===

XING is a German-language social networking service for professional contacts, with more than ten million German-speaking members. It was founded in 2003 under the name OpenBC by Lars Hinrichs. Initially, Hubert Burda Media acquired one-quarter of XING, then in 2012 acquired a majority. XING is now principally an online job placement site. Editorial content is also a key focus.
