= HolidayCheck Group =

HolidayCheck Group AG
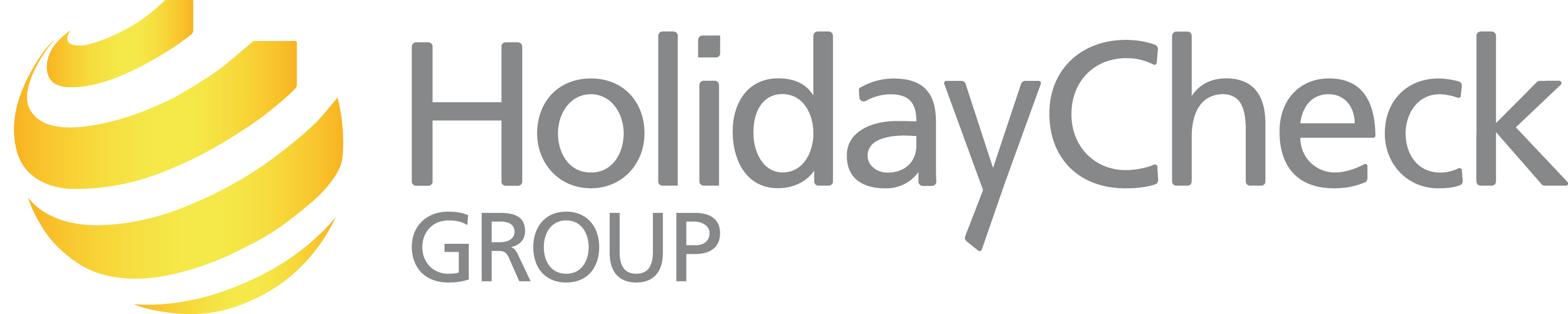
- Type: Public
- Industry: Digital media content provider
- Founded: 2001
- Headquarters: Munich, Germany
- Key people: Christoph Ludmann, CEO; Uta Fesefeldt, CFO
- Products: Online portals
- Revenue: €14.47 million (2020)
- Number of employees: 470
- Parent: Hubert Burda Media
- Website: www.holidaycheckgroup.com

HolidayCheck Group AG is an exchange-listed internet company based in Munich, Germany. It operates online portals for package-holiday reviews and bookings in Germany, Austria and Switzerland under the HolidayCheck brand.

The group was formed in 2001 as Tomorrow Focus AG through the merger of Focus Digital AG and Tomorrow Internet AG, and was renamed HolidayCheck Group AG in 2016.

== Origin ==
HolidayCheck began in 1999 as a private hotel-review website set up by students in Konstanz, Germany, among them Markus Schott, Hakan Öktem, Jens Freiter, Jörg Kampshoff and Sascha Vasic. After the broadcaster RTL reported on the site in 2003, its founders registered it as a commercial venture, which began operating on 11 November 2003.

== Operations ==
Users of HolidayCheck can book trips, compare offers and rate hotels and holidays. According to the company, the portal had about 2.5 million members and 8 million reviews in 2017.

Alongside the main portal, the group operates the car-rental comparison site MietwagenCheck through Drive Boo AG, and the Zoover review portals and the Meteovista and Weeronline weather services through WebAssets B.V.

== Ownership and acquisitions ==
In July 2006, Hubert Burda Media acquired 80 percent of HolidayCheck AG for €60 million through its subsidiaries Tomorrow Focus AG (51 percent) and Burda Digital Ventures (29 percent). Burda Digital Ventures sold its stake to Tomorrow Focus in 2007, the year HolidayCheck also acquired the portal Hotelcheck.de, and in 2008 it acquired the rival portal Urlaub.com.

In January 2009, Tomorrow Focus raised its holding to 94 percent for a further €21.6 million, and became the sole owner after the founders sold their remaining 6 percent in June 2013. The parent company made further travel-sector investments in 2015 while divesting online-publishing assets such as Focus Online and the Huffington Post, and changed its name to HolidayCheck Group AG in 2016.

== Reviews and litigation ==
HolidayCheck's user-generated reviews have been the subject of consumer testing and litigation. In a 2013 comparison of hotel-review portals by Stiftung Warentest, HolidayCheck rated best of the seven sites tested, with the testers noting its automated screening of submissions and a team that reviewed suspicious entries. In a judgment of 19 March 2015 (case I ZR 94/13), the Federal Court of Justice held that a review-portal operator need not verify user reviews before publication and is liable for false statements only after being notified of a specific violation. In 2023 the Regional Court of Munich I ruled in the company's favour against the agency Goldstar Marketing, holding that the sale of fabricated reviews was unlawful and ordering it to pay damages and to disclose the reviews' origin.

== Financial results ==
For the 2018 financial year the company reported operating EBITDA of €10.7 million on total revenue of €138.9 million, and for 2023 total revenue of about €147 million. Its shares trade in the Prime Standard segment of the Frankfurt Stock Exchange.

In 2019 the company had about 470 employees at sites in Bottighofen, Munich, Poznań and Warsaw. In a management change effective 1 February 2024, Christoph Ludmann became chief executive officer and Uta Fesefeldt chief financial officer.
