= Frieder Burda =

German art collector (1936–2019)

Frieder Burda (29 April 1936 – 14 July 2019, in Baden-Baden) was a German publisher, art collector and Honorary Citizen of Baden-Baden.

== Life ==
Born on 29 April 1936 in Gengenbach, Burda was the second son of publisher Franz Burda and his wife Aenne Burda (née Lemminger). Together with his older brother Franz and his younger brother Hubert, Burda grew up in Offenburg. After finishing school in Offenburg, Triberg and Switzerland, he completed a print and a publishing qualification. Burda was trained in his father's business group. Later he lived in France and became a magazine publisher. He spent several years in England and the United States before becoming a printer in Darmstadt. He developed his company into one of the leading commercial print foundries in Europe.

Burda died on 14 July 2019 in Baden-Baden at the age of 83.

== Art collection ==
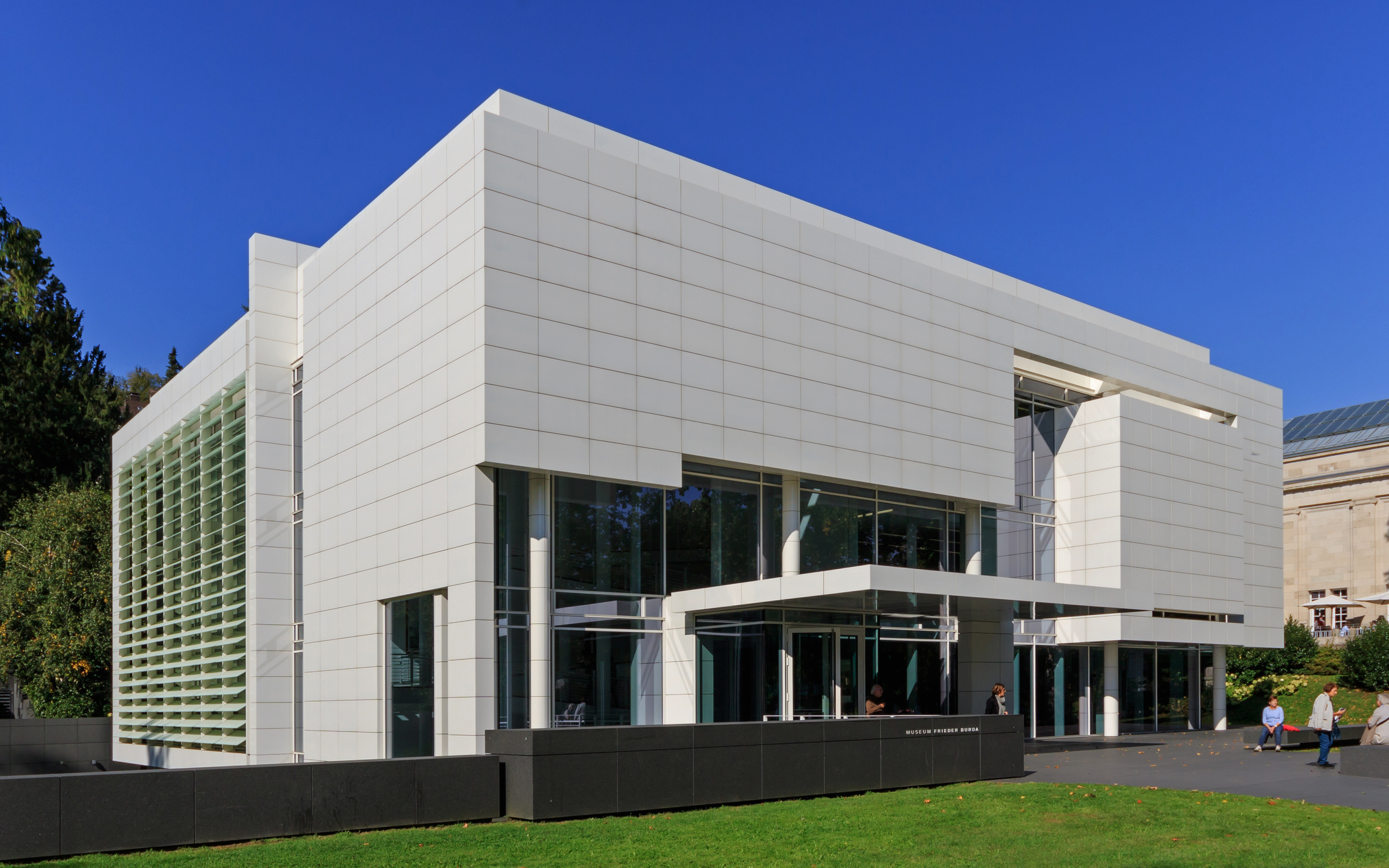
Museum Frieder Burda

A major art collector, Burda bought his first work, a slashed red painting by Lucio Fontana, at Kassel's Documenta 4 in 1968. In building his collection, he took advice from art-historian friends, including Werner Spies, Götz Adriani and Jean-Louis Prat.

Burda initially planned to build a museum near Mougins, France, where he had a house. In 2004, he opened Museum Frieder Burda in Baden-Baden, in a €20 million building designed by architect Richard Meier. The collection includes more than 700 works, including several late masterpieces by Picasso and major holdings of Germany's important postwar artists, such as Gerhard Richter and Sigmar Polke, plus a few pieces from his father's collection. The focus is on German painting, from artists ranging from Max Beckmann, Eugen Schönebeck, Georg Baselitz to Corinne Wasmuht. Following its opening in October 2004, the museum drew 40,000 visitors in its first two months. Only a sampling of the permanent collection can be displayed at one time (many works continue to be lent to special exhibitions and other museums).

The two-story glass and aluminum building itself is set on the edge of the main park in the town connected by a glass-sheathed bridge to the existing small Baden-Baden art museum, the Staatliche Kunsthalle Baden-Baden. A stand of enormous trees, including historic oaks and a blood beech, tower over the buildings. Meier's building won the American Institute of Architects Honor Award for Architecture in 2006.
