= Die glückliche Familie =

- Starring: Maria Schell; Siegfried Rauch; Maria Furtwängler
- Country of origin: Germany

Die glückliche Familie (The Happy Family) is a German television series made up of three seasons, and has a total of 52 episodes. The series ran from 1987 to 1991 on Wednesdays. This show tells the story of the Behringer family living through their day-to-day problems.

== See also ==
- List of German television series
