= Superillu =

- Editor-in-chief: Stefan Kobus
- Categories: East German issues, illustrated
- Frequency: Weekly
- Circulation: 159,165
- Publisher: Hubert Burda Media
- First issue: August 23, 1990; 34 years ago
- Country: Germany
- Based in: Berlin
- Language: German
- Website: www.superillu.de
- ISSN: 1433-9900
- OCLC: 47259126

SUPERillu is a weekly German yellow-press magazine from Berlin, which is well-read in Eastern Germany.

== History and profile ==
Superillu was founded in summer 1990 in East Berlin. The first edition appeared on 23 August 1990, six weeks before German reunification. The magazine is owned by the Hubert Burda Media group. The magazine is published by the same company on a weekly basis.

The magazine touches a range of themes, including advice columns, entertainment, politics, and business. Articles about East Germany's history, the fate and achievements of prominent East Germans after 1990 in sports, popular culture and other fields of society as well as the development of German unity are also common. Overall, drawing a positive image of East Germany is a common theme of many articles.

Superillu had a circulation of 583,000 copies in 2000. In 2010 the circulation of the magazine was 434,169 copies.
