= Hans Reiss =

German academic (1922–2020)

Hans Siegbert Reiss Ph.D. (19 August 1922 – 2 April 2020) was Professor Emeritus of German at the University of Bristol.

== Life ==
Reiss was born in Mannheim, Germany on Luisenring. Reiss was the only son of a Jewish printer, Berthold Reiss, and the actress Maria Reiss-Petri (who performed for the National Theatre Mannheim); his father's printing company was the largest in southwestern Germany. He was sent to Ireland by his parents after the 1938 pogroms; Reiss's parents survived the war in Heidelberg and the family was reunited in June 1946. He completed his education in Ireland and was awarded a scholarship to study at Trinity College Dublin in 1940. He received his Bachelor of Arts in 1943 and Ph.D. on Arthur Schnitzler from TCD in 1945, where he was assistant to the Professor of German, Max Liddell, from 1943 to 1946.

From 1946 to 1953 he was lecturer at the London School of Economics. From 1953 to 1958 he lectured at Queen Mary, University of London (then Queen Mary College). In 1957 he was appointed Professor and Head of the Department of German Studies at McGill University, Montreal. From 1965 until his retirement in 1988 he was professor and head of the German Department at the University of Bristol. Thereafter he held a number of guest professorships, and was Senior Research Fellow at the University of Bristol from 1995 until 2009.

He was married to the artist Linda Reiss from 1963 until his death; they had two children, Thomas and Richard. In 2009 they moved to Heidelberg in Germany. He died in 2020 in Heidelberg.

== Work ==
Hans Reiss's research was focussed on Goethe and 20th-century German literature, as well as German political thought around 1800. He achieved international recognition with his publication of Kant's Political Writings in 1970. His book publications include:

- Franz Kafka (1952; 1956).
- The Political Thought of the German Romantics (1793-1815) (1955).
- Goethes Romane (1963).
- Das Politische Denken in der Deutschen Romantik (1966).
- Kant’s Political Writings (1970; 2nd enlarged edition 1991), ISBN 0-521-39837-1 and ISBN 0-521-39185-7. Translated into Chinese in 2013.
- Goethe's Novels (1969; 1971), ISBN 0-870-24198-2.
- Kants Politisches Denken (1977), ISBN 3-261-02071-7. Translated into Japanese in 1989.
- The Writer’s Task from Nietzsche to Brecht (1978), ISBN 0-87471-870-8.
- Formgestaltung und Politik, Goethe-Studien (1993), ISBN 3-88479-689-5.
- Erinnerungen aus 85 Jahren (2009), ISBN 978-3-87115-007-4.

Since 1974 Reiss edited British and Irish Studies in German Language and Literature, initially with Idris Parry, then as sole editor, and from 1988 with W.E. Yates. The series closed in 2015.

== Awards ==
- 1972: Goethe's Novels was voted "Outstanding Book of the Year 1972" by the American Association of College and Research Libraries
- 1988: Order of Merit of the Federal Republic of Germany 1st Class
- 1997: Goethe Medal in Gold of the Goethe-Gesellschaft Weimar
- 2011: Life Member of the Modern Humanities Research Association (MHRA)
- Since 1981 he has been a member of the Freie Akademie der Künste Rhein-Neckar (previously known as the Freie Akademie der Künste Mannheim) in Mannheim.
