= Hubert Burda =

German publisher (born 1940)

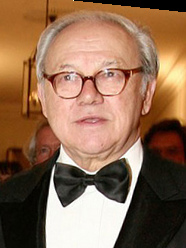
- Burda in 2011
- Born: 9 February 1940 (age 86); Heidelberg, Germany
- Education: LMU Munich
- Occupation: Publisher
- Title: CEO, Hubert Burda Media
- Spouses: Christa Maar (m. 1967; div. 1972); Maria Furtwängler (m. 1991)
- Children: 3
- Parent(s): Aenne Burda; Franz Burda I
- Website: hubertburda.de

Hubert Burda (born 9 February 1940) is a German billionaire publisher. He is the owner, publisher and general partner of Hubert Burda Media, a global media company of more than 600 media products, including websites, print magazines and other brands. It operates in 20 countries, predominantly in Germany and the UK. Its brands include Focus, Bunte and Radio Times.

Burda is chairman of the conference Digital Life Design (DLD), which takes place annually in January in Munich.

As of July 2025, Forbes estimates his net worth at $4 billion.

== Early life ==
Burda is the youngest son of the publishing couple Franz and Aenne Burda, alongside his older brothers Franz and Frieder.

As a sixth-form pupil he took painting lessons daily and hoped to become a painter, against his father's wishes. His father permitted him to study art history only on condition that he wait until after the age of 25 to begin.

Burda attended LMU Munich, where he studied art history with Hans Sedlmayr, as well as archaeology and sociology. He earned his doctorate in art history before the age of 26; his dissertation was titled Die Ruine in Hubert Robert's Pictures.

After several traineeships in US advertising agencies and publishers, Burda worked until 1974 as publishing director of the Burda magazine Bild und Funk. As an independent project, in 1969 he founded the magazine m - The Magazine For Men.

== Burda Holding ==
Burda assumed the role of sole shareholder and CEO of Burda Holding in 1987. In 1988, he recruited the editorial director of Bild-Zeitung, Günter Prinz, from Springer-Verlag. In addition to the program magazine Super TV, Burda also established SUPERillu, the magazine with the largest circulation in what was then East Germany, launching six weeks before German reunification.

In 1993, Burda collaborated with Helmut Markwort to develop the news magazine Focus, a rival to Der Spiegel.

In 1999, Burda renamed the holding company to Hubert Burda Media. Under his father the firm's revenues were split broadly equally between printing and publishing, but under Hubert the firm significantly expanded its digital and international operations, including joint ventures with Hachette, Microsoft and Rizzoli and international expansion into countries such as Singapore, Thailand, India, Russia.

=== Current operations ===
In 2018, Hubert Burda Media employed 12,369 staff and achieved revenues of €2.66 billion in its four divisions (Digital Brands National, Media Brands National, Media Brands International and Print).

Burda's German publishing arm generated over €650million, reaching approximately three-quarters of the German population. The firm's international division recorded a turnover of €413 million.

== Career and memberships ==
As of July 2025, Forbes estimated Burda's net worth at US$4 billion. He is the third richest publisher in Germany, after Friede Springer and Elisabeth Mohn.

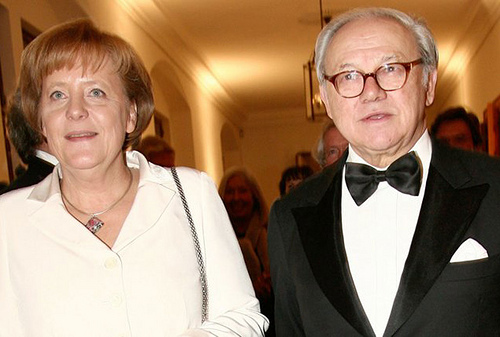
Angela Merkel and Hubert Burda in the Munich Residence on Burda's 70th birthday (2010)

Burda stepped down as CEO in 2010. He has given Burda Media shares to his two children; Elisabeth and Jacob each now hold 37.4% of the company, leaving him with 25.1%.

=== Memberships ===
- Member of the Advisory Council of the Association Against Forgetting - For Democracy
- Founder of the Academy of the Third Millennium
- Founder of the Iconic Turn lecture series, discussing the impact of images, photographs, mass media and technologies on culture, society and science
- President of the VDZ Academy of the Association of German Magazine Publishers
- Co-founder of European Publishers Council (EPC)
- Panel member of the World Economic Forum, Davos
- Former chairman of Ludwig-Maximilians-Universität München (LMU)
- Founder of the Hubert Burda Center for Innovative Communication at Ben-Gurion University of Negev, Be'er Sheva, Israel
- Initiator of the project "Godfather for Tolerance" in support of the Jewish Center Munich, on Jakobsplatz
- Chairman of the Board of Trustees Germany Foundation Integration

== Philanthropy ==
In 1975, Burda initiated the Petrarca-Preis. It was awarded to contemporary poets and translators from 1975 to 1999 and from 2010 to 2014. It was succeeded from 1999 to 2009 by the Hermann Lenz Prize, before reverting to the Petrarca Prize from 2010 to 2014.

From 1987 to 1995, Burda supported the Petrarca Translator Prize for Literary Translations. Between 1988 and 1995, he supported the Nicolas Born prize for lyrics.

In 1997, he founded the Corporate Art Prize for the cultural engagement of companies and initiatives.

In 1999, he founded the Hubert Burda Foundation, dedicated to literature, international understanding, art, culture and science. In the same year he also created the Hubert Burda Prize for Young Poetry from Eastern Europe.

In 2001, Burda established the Felix Burda Foundation, dedicated to the early detection and prevention of colon cancer. The foundation was named in memory of his son Felix, who died of the disease.

In 2005, together with the city of Offenburg, Burda donated the 2005 European Translators Award.

Since 2006 Burda has supported the Aenne Burda Award. The award aims to encourage the work of young women in the media. It is given at Burda's Digital, Life, Design conference.

=== German-Jewish reconciliation ===
Burda has been decorated by German-Jewish interest groups for his promotion of German industrial reparations. He has been active in building connections between Jews and non-Jews in Germany, promoting close ties with Israel and supporting the revival of Jewish life in his home city of Munich. He is an Honorary Senator of the College of Jewish Studies in Heidelberg.

In October 1999, he received the Interfaith Gold Medallion from the International Council of Christians and Jews for his services to German–Jewish reconciliation.

In 2005, together with German publishing houses, he initiated the project Paten für Toleranz to support the Jewish Centre Jakobsplatz in Munich. Burda donated €1m to the project.

Burda co-financed the production of an English-language CD-ROM of the Shoah Foundation (Survivors of the Shoah Visual History Foundation) by Steven Spielberg.

Burda's father, Franz Burda, was a publisher of maps prior to the rise of the Nazi regime and after it took power. Burda senior later became a supplier to the regime and, from 1938, a party member. The Burda publishing company's history during the Third Reich was described by Salomon Korn, a former Vice President of the Central Council of Jews in Germany, as a "case study for coming generations as to the question of guilt and conscience, of entanglement and dealing with the burden of this legacy".

=== Member of the Federal Assembly ===
At the suggestion of the CDU, Hubert Burda was a member of the 14th Federal Assembly and participated in the election of the German Federal President on 30 June 2010.

== Publications ==
- The Ruin in the pictures Hubert Robert s Fink, Munich 1967 (Dissertation, Faculty of Arts of the Ludwig-Maximilians-Universität München, 1967).
- (Ed.) Weltmarkt der Medien. Contributions by Wolfgang R. Langenbucher and Holger Rust. Burda, Munich 1993.
- The Digital Revolution. In: Media + Education. Jg. 38 (1994), No. 5, ISSN 0176-4918; pp. 268–271.
- (Edited with Christa Maar) Iconic Turn. The new power of images. DuMont, Cologne 2004, ISBN 3-8321-7873-2.
- Medial Chambers of Wonder. Hrsg. Wolfgang Ullrich. Fink, Munich 2009, ISBN 978-3-7705-4802-6.
- What the Traditional Economy Can Learn From an Internet Entrepreneur. In: Ders., Mathias Döpfner, Bodo Hombach, Jürgen Rüttgers (ed.): 2020 - Thoughts on the Future of the Internet. Klartext, Essen, 2010. ISBN 978-3-8375-0376-0.
- In medias res. Ten chapters on the Iconic Turn. Petrarca / Fink, Munich / Paderborn 2010, ISBN 978-3-7705-5125-5.
- "The Bunte story - a people magazine in times of upheaval." Pantheon Verlag, Munich 2012, ISBN 978-3-570-55221-6 (Paperback), ISBN 978- 3-641-10040-7 (e-book).
- Hubert Burda: The Colorful Story. A people magazine in times of upheaval. Pantheon, Munich 2012
- Hans-Jürgen Jakobs: That's new, Pussycat . In: Süddeutsche Zeitung , 8 November 2012 (briefing) Excerpt
- Notes on the Digital Revolution 1990-2015: How the Media Change , Petrarca Verlag, Munich 2014, ISBN 978-3-871150463. world / new-book-burdas-notes-to-digital-revolution / 11095832.html Burda's notes to the digital revolution, wiwo.de, news release 9 December 2014.
- "Digital Horizons: Strategies for New Media", Petrarca Verlag, Munich 2016, ISBN 978-3-87115-098-2.
- Landwege - Seewege, Petrarca Verlag, Munich 2017
- Walk with Hubert Burda: Origin. Black Forest., By Elmar Langenbacher, 2017, ISBN 978-3-000-58285-1.

== Literature ==
- Judith Betzler (ed.): Hubert Burda. Art and media; Festschrift, 9 February 2000. Petrarca, Munich 2000.
- Gero von Boehm: Hubert Burda. 11 June 2002 . Interview in: Encounters. People pictures from three decades . Collection Rolf Heyne, Munich 2012, ISBN 978-3-89910-443-1, pp. 289–297.
- Gisela Freisinger: Hubert Burda. The Medienfürst. Campus, Frankfurt am Main 2005, ISBN 3-593-37417-X.
- "Very female oriented". Burda publishing house: the Munich media house is inspired by the aggressiveness. In: Manager Magazin. 35, 2, 2005, p. 20
- " ... but he was not like that." In: Offenburger Tageblatt, 23 January 2007 (Interview with Burda by Jürgen Rohn).
- Stefan Niggemeier: -1408790.html "Digital Life Design": Not only is everything possible - it's getting better and better . In: Frankfurter Allgemeine Zeitung. 24 January 2007.

== Films ==
- Hubert Burda. Between rebellion and duty. Documentary, Germany, 2006, 45 min., Written and directed by Kathrin Pitterling, Produced by Norddeutscher Rundfunk, Series: The Heirs, Part 3, First broadcast: 22 January 2007.
- Gero von Boehm meets… Hubert Burda. Interview. Germany, 2002, 45 min., Director: Gero von Boehm, Producer: Interscience, First broadcast 24 April 2002 in 3sat.

== Awards ==
- 1997: Federal Cross of Merit, First Class
- 1999: Interfaith Gold Medal of the International Panel of Christians and Jews
- 2000: Honorary Professorship of the Prime Minister of the State of Baden-Württemberg
- 2000: Honorary citizenship of the city of Offenburg
- 2000: Honorary Membership of the Bavarian Academy of Fine Arts
- 2000: Medal " Munich shines - the friends of Munich" in gold
- 2000: Bavarian Print Media Award
- 2002: Great Federal Cross of Merit
- 2002: Honorary professor, by the Minister-President of Baden-Württemberg.
- 2004: Future Prize of the Christian-Democratic Workforce
- 2005: Grand Officer's Cross of the Order of Merit of the Italian Republic
- 2006: Leo Baeck Prize
- 2007: Jakob Fugger Medal of the Association of Magazine Publishers in Bavaria
- 2008: Medal of Merit of the State of Baden-Württemberg
- 2008: Grand Cross of Merit with star, from President Köhler at Bellevue Palace.
- 2009: Honorary Doctor of the Medical Faculty of LMU Munich
- 2009: Ohel-Jakob Medal
- 2011: Honorary senator of the College of Jewish Studies
- 2012: Officer of the Legion of Honor
- 2014: Tolerance Ring of the European Academy of Sciences and Arts
- 2014: Award for understanding and tolerance of the Jewish Museum Berlin
- 2015: Moses Mendelssohn Medal
- 2019: Award of Honorary Citizenship of Munich

Burda holds the European Print Media Prize and the Gold Medal Freedom of Speech of the European Association of Communications Agencies (EACA).

He is a Member of the Bavarian Academy of Fine Arts. He also holds a Hermann Lenz Award for German lyrics.

== Personal life ==
Burda married the art historian Christa Maar in 1967. The couple divorced in 1972. Their son Felix (born 1967) died of colorectal cancer in January 2001 (see Felix Burda Foundation).

In 1991, Burda married the doctor and actress Maria Furtwängler. They have two children, Jakob (born 1990) and Elisabeth (born 1992).
