= Offenburg =

- City
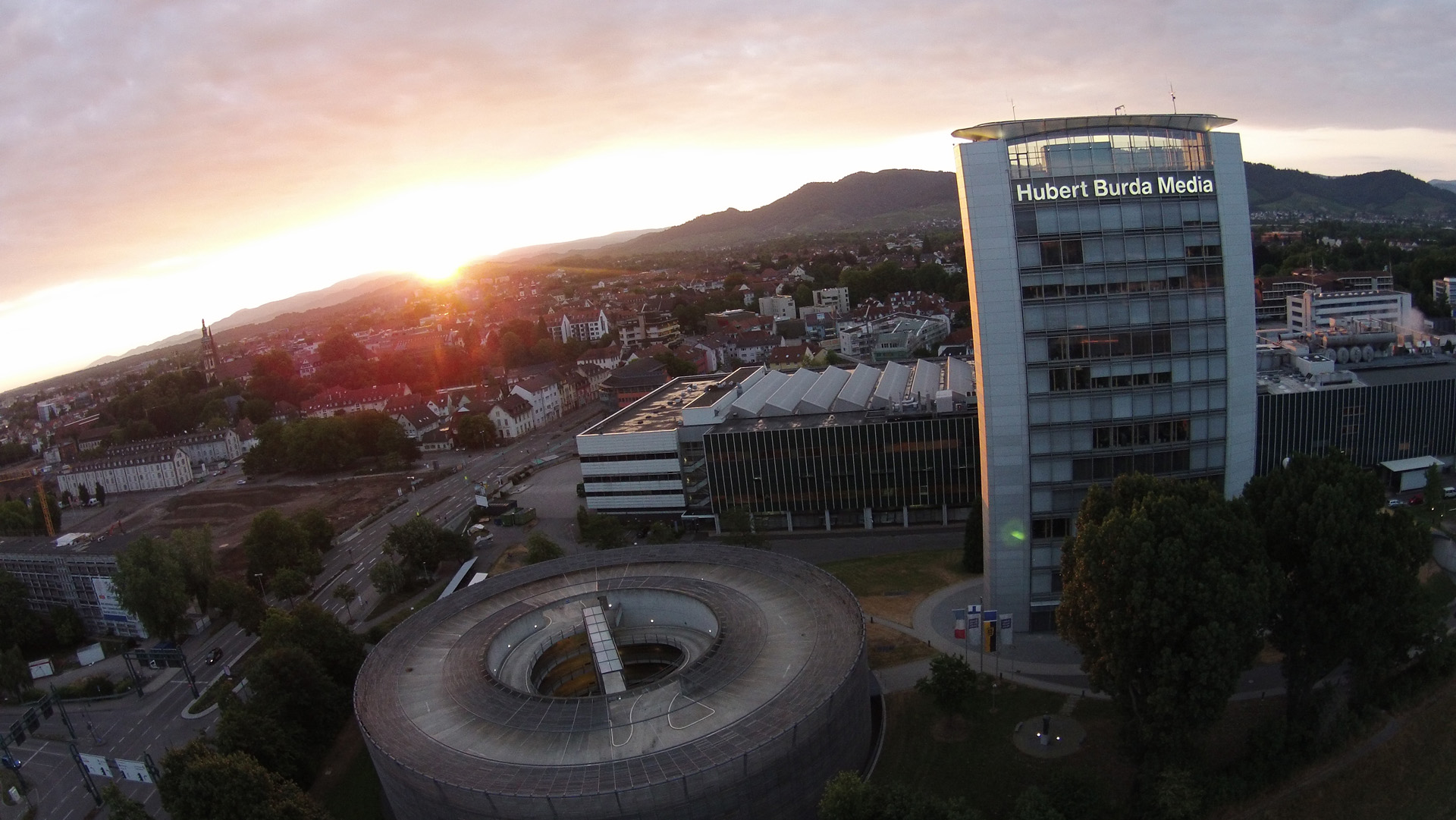
- Aerial view

- Flag Coat of arms

- Location of Offenburg within Ortenaukreis district
- Interactive map of Offenburg
- Location within Germany Location within Baden-Württemberg
- Coordinates: 48°28′N 7°56′E
- Country: Germany
- State: Baden-Württemberg
- Admin. region: Freiburg
- District: Ortenaukreis

Government
  - Mayor (2018–26): Marco Steffens (CDU)

Area
  - Total: 78.37 km^{2} (30.26 sq mi)
- Elevation: 163 m (535 ft)

Population (2025-12-31)
  - Total: 63,437
  - Density: 809.5/km^{2} (2,096/sq mi)
- Time zone: UTC+01:00 (CET)
  - Summer (DST): UTC+02:00 (CEST)
- Postal codes: 77652, 77654, 77656
- Dialling codes: 0781
- Vehicle registration: OG, BH, KEL, LR, WOL
- Website: www.offenburg.de

Offenburg (German pronunciation: [ˈɔfn̩bʊʁk]; "open borough" - coat of arms showing open gates; Low Alemmanic: Offäburg) is a city in the state of Baden-Württemberg, in south-western Germany. With nearly 60,000 inhabitants (2019), it is the largest city and the administrative capital of the Ortenaukreis.

== History ==
In recent times the remains of Roman settlements have been found within the city's territory. Offenburg was first mentioned in historical documents dating back to 1148. Offenburg had already been declared a Free Imperial City by 1240. In September 1689, the city - with the exception of two buildings - was totally destroyed by the French during the Nine Years War. Due to Napoleon's dissolution of the Holy Roman Empire in 1803 and subsequent reorganization of the German states, Offenburg lost its status as a Free Imperial City and fell under the rule of the Grand Duchy of Baden.

During the outbreak of the Revolutions of 1848, the "Offenburger Programm" which consisted of thirteen demands "in the name of the people of Baden", was put forward at the Salmen Inn on 12 September 1847. This was the first known demand for democracy in Germany. Along with the Carlsbad Decrees, the Offenburger Program demanded basic and human rights as well as freedom of the press and a progressive income tax structure. On 19 March 1848 the demands were confirmed by the 20,000 member Offenburg Peoples' Assembly.

During World War I Offenburg was one of the first cities to experience the effects of aerial bombardment, the operations against Offenburg railway sidings were mostly flown by aircraft from the Independent Force from Ochey aerodrome.

It is mostly neglected, that in the aftermath of World War I, during the Occupation of the Rhineland, French troops occupied Offenburg, because it fell within the perimeter of the Kehl bridgehead. The French occupation forces entered the town in February 1923 and remained until 1924, blocking all traffic on the Rhine Valley Railway between Offenburg and Appenweier.

Following the rise to power of the NSDAP in the 1930s, Offenburg's Jewish population fell victim to acts of repression, that culminated in the vandalization of the local synagoge in November 1938. After the war had begun, those members of the Jewish population that had not managed to emigrate were deported to Gurs concentration camp in October 1940 and from there to Auschwitz during 1942.

In World War II, it was the location of the Heilag V-C, Oflag 55/V-D and Stalag V-C prisoner-of-war camps for Allied POWs of various nationalities, including French, Polish, Belgian, British, Serbian, American, Soviet, Italian, Indian and South African. Owing to its geographical proximity to the French border, Offenburg was either exposed to temporary evacuations during the Battle of France in 1940 or artillery fire towards the final stages of the conflict. It was only a primary target on one occasion during World War II on 27 November 1944, when a force of more than 300 USAAF B-17 and Liberator bombers attacked the marshalling yards. Many other tactical attacks were flown during 1944 and 1945 against the railway installations.

French Forces entered Offenburg on 15 April 1945 and from then on Offenburg became part of the French Zone of Occupation until the creation of the Federal Republic of Germany in May 1949.

Since the creation of the Federal Republic, Offenburg has continually developed in size, inhabitants and prosperity. Between 1971 and 1975 eleven adjacent villages were incorporated into the commune of Offenburg and are now an integral part of the city.

== Government ==
=== Mayors ===
- 1801–1803: Leopold Witsch
- 1803–1832: Johann Nepomuk Lihl and Josef Sebastian Gottwald
- 1832–1840: Karl Josef Burger
- 1840–1845: Landolin Löffler
- 1845–1849: Gustav Rée
- 1849–1859: August Wiedemeyer (1849–1851 acting)
- 1860–1875: Bernhard Schaible
- 1875–1890: Franz Volk
- 1893–1921: Fritz Herrmann
- 1921–1934: Josef Holler
- 1934–1945: Wolfram Rombach
- 1945: Hermann Isenmann (acting)
- 1945–1946: Ludwig Heß, (acting)
- 1946–1947: Gustav Ernst (acting)
- 1947–1948: R. Moßbrugger (acting)
- 1949–1975: Karl Heitz
- 1975–1989: Martin Grüber
- 1989–2002: Wolfgang Bruder
- 2003–2018: Edith Schreiner
- since 3 December 2018: Marco Steffens

=== Representatives to the Federal Parliament ===
- Wolfgang Schäuble (CDU) represented the constituency of Offenburg as directly elected MP in the Lower House of the German Parliament from 1972 till his death in 2023. He also held office as 13th President of the Bundestag between 2017 and 2021.

== Geography ==
Offenburg is located approximately 15 km east of the river Rhine between Karlsruhe and Freiburg. The French city of Strasbourg lies 20 km northwest across the Rhine. Offenburg is situated at the mouth of the Kinzig river valley and at the foot of the Black Forest. The Kinzig flows out of the Black Forest and meets the Rhine near Kehl.

=== Climate ===
Köppen climate classification classifies its climate as oceanic (Cfb). Marine features are limited however, as a result of its vast distance from oceans and seas. Winters are cool, sometimes with night frosts. Precipitation mostly falls in summer months.

Climate data for Offenburg (normals 1991-2020)
Month	Jan	Feb	Mar	Apr	May	Jun	Jul	Aug	Sep	Oct	Nov	Dec	Year
Daily mean °C (°F)	2.6 (36.7)	3.6 (38.5)	7.2 (45.0)	11.2 (52.2)	15.3 (59.5)	19.8 (67.6)	20.6 (69.1)	20.0 (68.0)	15.7 (60.3)	11.1 (52.0)	6.4 (43.5)	3.6 (38.5)	11.4 (52.6)
Average precipitation mm (inches)	55.9 (2.20)	51.4 (2.02)	57.9 (2.28)	59.0 (2.32)	94.7 (3.73)	86.0 (3.39)	89.5 (3.52)	84.4 (3.32)	64.9 (2.56)	76.0 (2.99)	68.1 (2.68)	67.6 (2.66)	855.4 (33.67)
Mean monthly sunshine hours	54	82	138.9	185.1	210.4	231.1	245.6	230	171.2	103.9	56	41.3	1,749.5
Source: Deutscher Wetterdienst

== Economy ==
Offenburg has a rich trade and manufacturing sector and is home to a number of well-known brands.

=== Manufacturing and industry ===
Important manufacturing companies based at Offenburg include tesa-Werke Offenburg GmbH (adhesive tapes), Vivil (humbugs and sweets), MEIKO Maschinenbau GmbH & Co. KG (professional dishwashing systems, cleaning and disinfection technology), Hansgrohe SE (sanitary fittings) and HOBART GmbH (professional kitchen equipment). There are many other small and medium-sized companies that produce highly specialized advanced products in their appropriate sector of business.

=== Trade and commerce ===
The most important trading company in terms of employees (1,850) is EDEKA Handelsgesellschaft Südwest mbH, the largest German supermarket corporation which has a large regional production, storage and distribution centre in Offenburg. Printus GmbH with approx. 1,600 employees is a stationary wholesaling company. Several subsidiaries or affiliated companies of Markant AG (food and nonfood trade) are based in Offenburg with approx. 600 staff.

=== Publishing and printing ===
Hubert Burda Media is one of Germany's largest publishing companies. Together with the affiliated Burda printing works it still employs 1,600 people in Offenburg. Although the prominent position with regard to the number of employees has diminished during the last decades with the emerging of further economic actors in town, the expansion of Franz Burda's printing business after World War II as well as the growth and success of his wife Aenne Burda's Burda Style (formerly Burda Moden) have been decisive in developing the local economy after 1945 and in making the name of the city known all over the world.

== Infrastructure ==
=== Traffic ===
Owing to its favourable geographic situation Offenburg lies at the crossroads of important lines of communication that can be traced back to Roman times.

==== Road ====
Offenburg is situated 3 km east of the federal motorway A 5, to which it has been connected since 1960 via a famous egg-shaped junction. Two major federal roads, B 3 and B 33, intersect at Offenburg.

==== Rail ====
Since the construction of the railway line from Mannheim in 1844, Offenburg had developed into a railway centre during the 19th and earlier part of the 20th century. However, since the privatization of the Deutsche Bundesbahn in the early 1990s and the ensuing restructuring of the Deutsche Bahn AG, which subsequently led to the decommissioning of the railway workshops, the operations in Offenburg have considerably shrunk in size. Today Offenburg station lies at the crossroads of a number of railway lines, the most important being the Rhine Valley Railway, the main line between Karlsruhe and Basel with regular Intercity Express (ICE) services to Basel, Berlin, Cologne, Frankfurt, Frankfurt Airport and Amsterdam. The picturesque Black Forest Railway starts at Offenburg as does the line to Strasbourg and the line serving the Rench valley in the Black Forest. Due to the re-routing of the TGV services from Freiburg to Paris-Est via Offenburg (instead of via Müllheim and Mulhouse) in December 2018, there has since been a daily (except Saturdays) direct service from Offenburg via Strasbourg to Paris-Est.

==== Air ====
Offenburg airfield (EDTO) has been used for flying purposes since 1911 and has received a paved runway in 1975. It is owned by the municipality. However, since its declassification as a publicly accessible airfield in the 1990s, the 910 metre asphalt runway (02-20) is only available to resident aeroclubs and to aircraft that have obtained prior permission from the operator. Airports in the vicinity are: Flughafen Lahr in Lahr (EDTL) and, with scheduled traffic, Strasbourg-Entzheim (LFST) and Baden-Söllingen (EDSB). Both, Lahr and Baden-Söllingen had formerly been used by the Canadian Forces in Europe and became available for civil use after the end of the Cold War. The combination of an abundance of three well-equipped airports close by, the ever-growing noise sensitivity of residents as well as the necessity for commercial development areas has in 2012 revived discussions to shut down the aerodrome completely.

== Education ==
Apart from the primary and secondary schools that are within the responsibility of several public bodies, Offenburg houses a diverse number of educational institutions.

Offenburg is also home to the University of Applied Sciences Offenburg, with its main campus location in Offenburg, and the other campus in Gengenbach (less than 12 km away).

== Cultural heritage ==
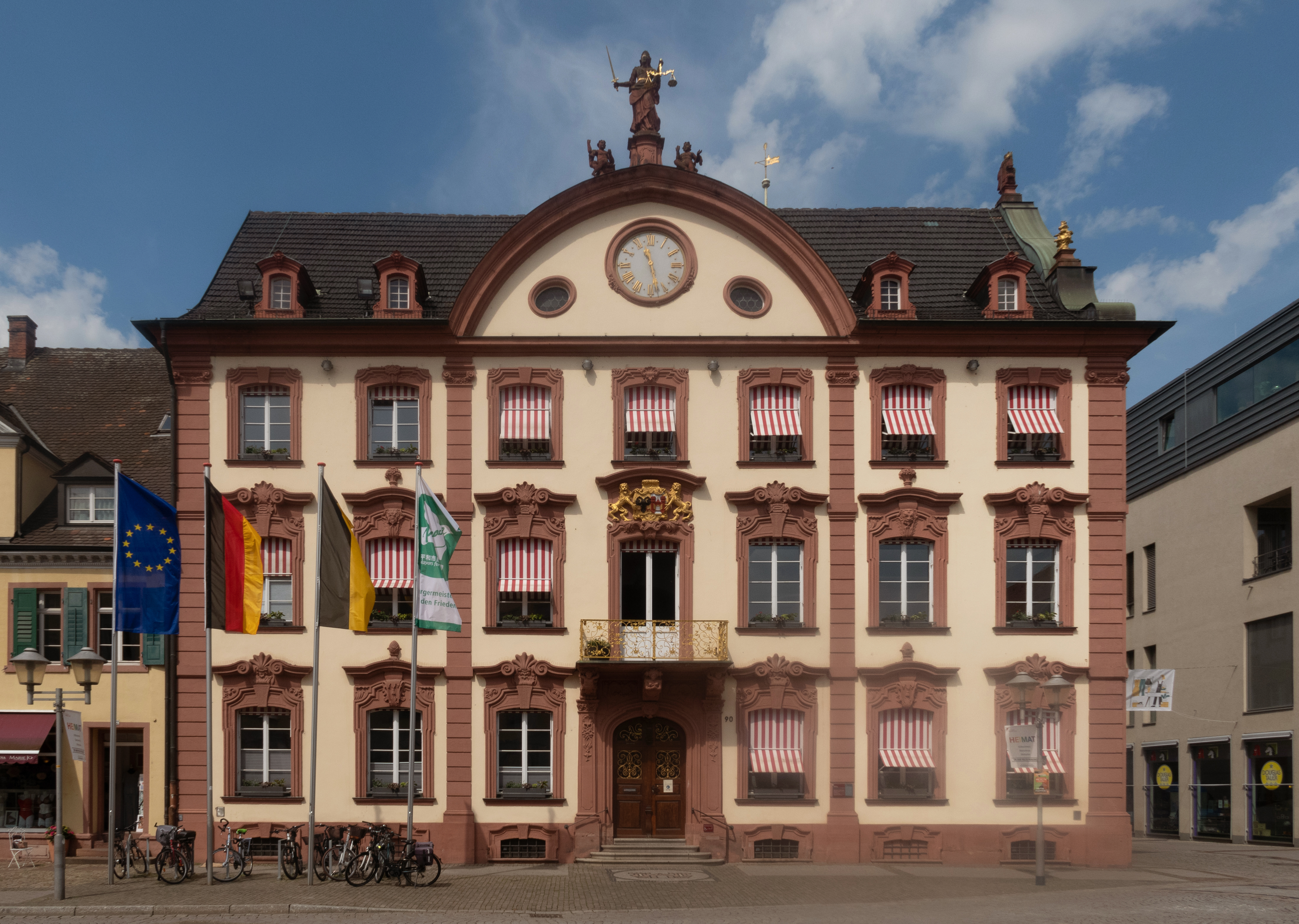
City Hall

There are several historical attractions in Offenburg including:

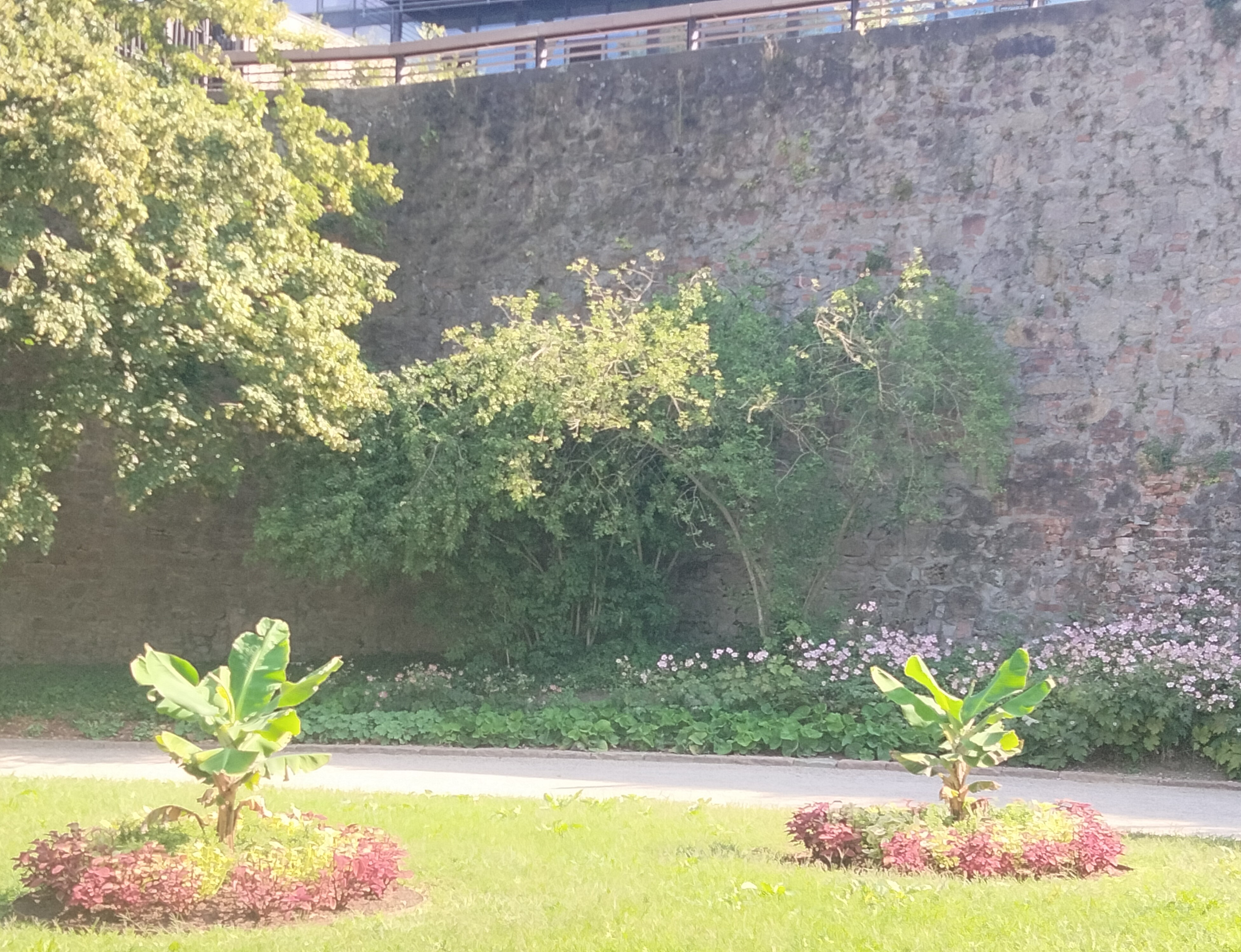
Medieval city wall with banana trees in Zwinger Park

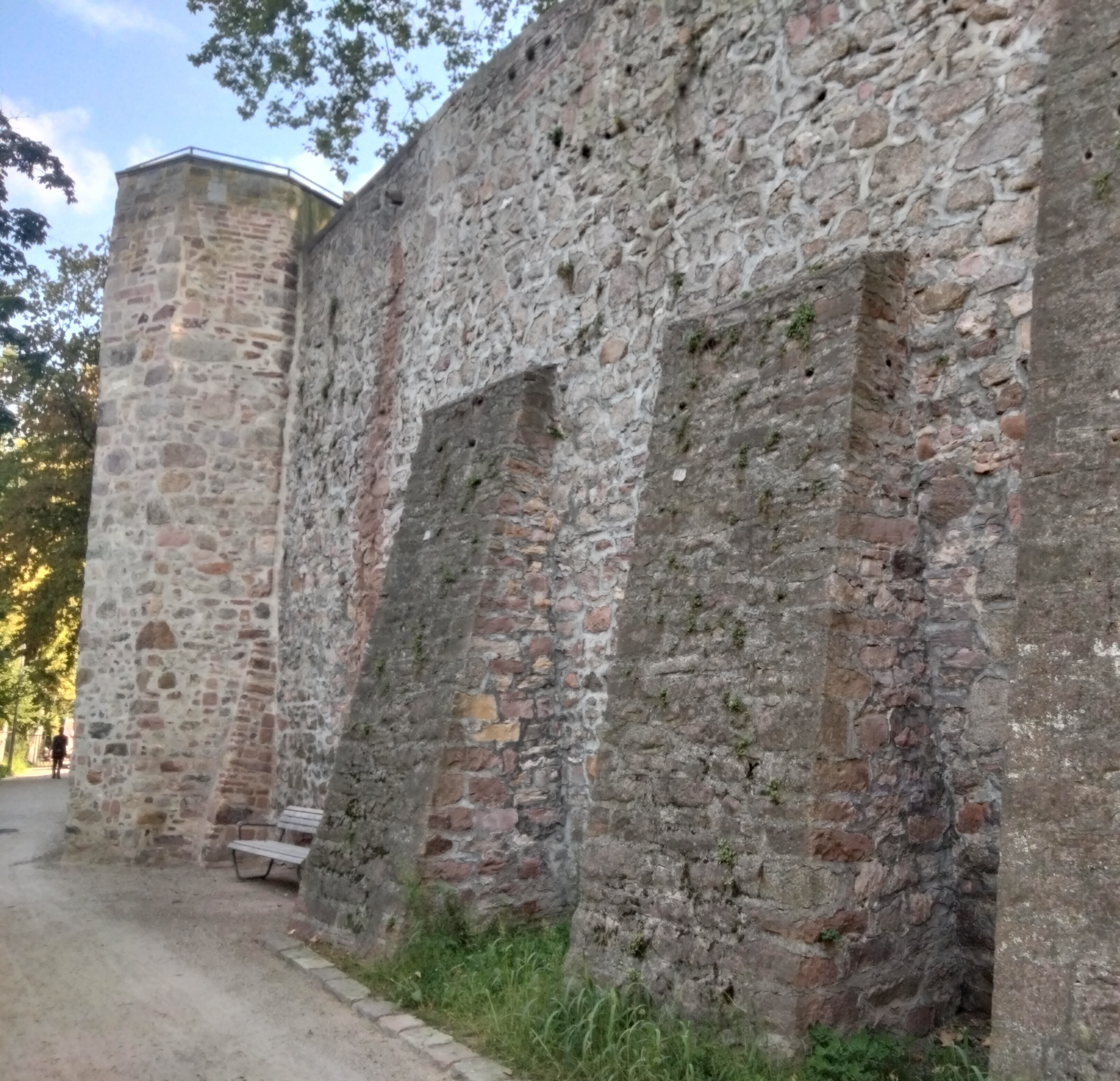
Medieval city wall

- Hirschapotheke is an old pharmacy built in 1698. The Löwenbrunnen (Lions' Fountain) in front of it dates from 1599.
- The City Hall was founded in 1521 and enlarged in a baroque style in 1741.
- Saint Ursula's Column in the middle of the Market Place was erected in 1961. Legend has it that Saint Ursula saved the city in the Thirty Years' War in 1631.
- The Salmen Inn
- The Capuchin Monastery
- The Ritterhaus, a 1784 manor-house that has been converted into the city archives and museum
- The Jewish Bath (Mikveh): a bathhouse belonging to the city's historical Jewish community; it was held to be medieval, but recent research suggests it may be from the 16th or 17th century
- The former Royal Palace (Königshof) built by Michael Ludwig Rohrer 1714 - 1717, now housing the Police station
- A part (1,340 metres) of the medieval city wall built in the 11th century can be visited in the west of the city centre. Zwinger Park in front of the wall with its banana trees is worth a visit as well.
- The Protestant Church (Evangelische Stadtkirche) was built from 1857-1864 in a neogothique style. Its tower was damaged by artillery at the end of World War II.
- Holy Trinity Church (Dreifaltigkeitskirche) was built from 1906 to 1908 in a neoromanesque style and damaged during World War II.
- The Church of the Holy Cross (Heiligkreuzkirche) was built in the 13th century, burnt down in 1689 and was rebuilt at the end of the 17th century.

== Sports ==
Offenburger FV is a German association football club based in the city of Offenburg, Baden-Württemberg. The club is one of the most successful amateur football clubs in Germany.

== Notable people ==
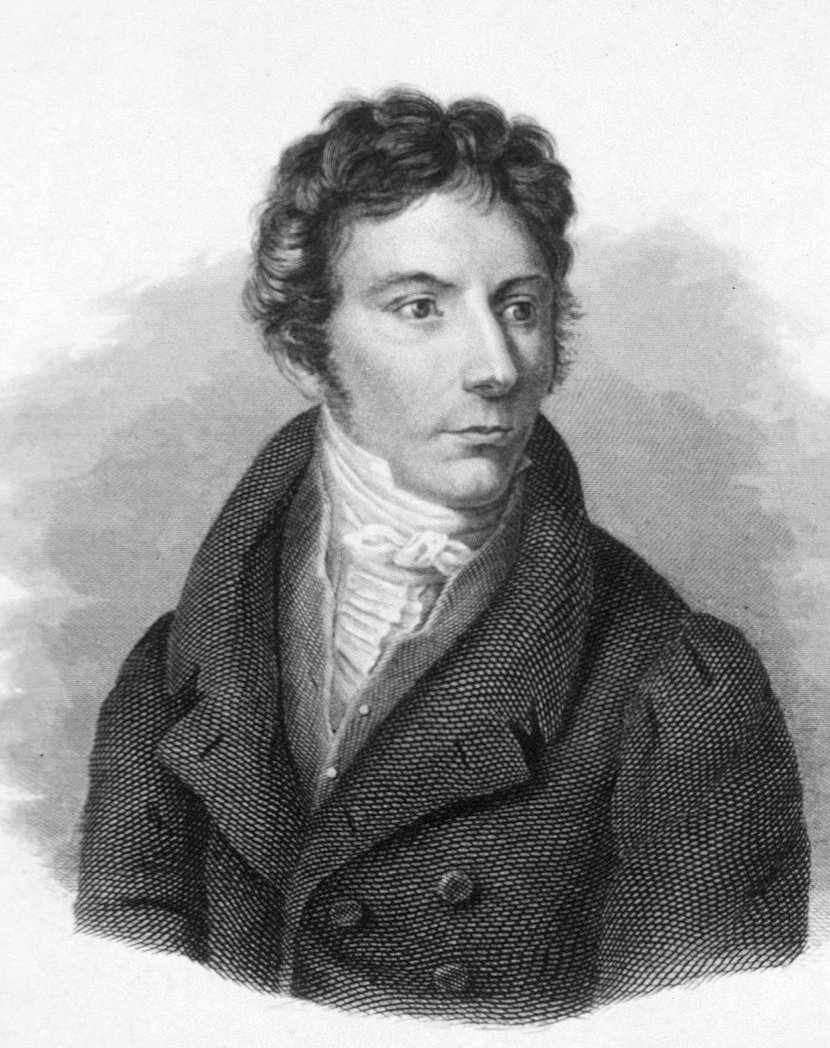
Lorenz Oken

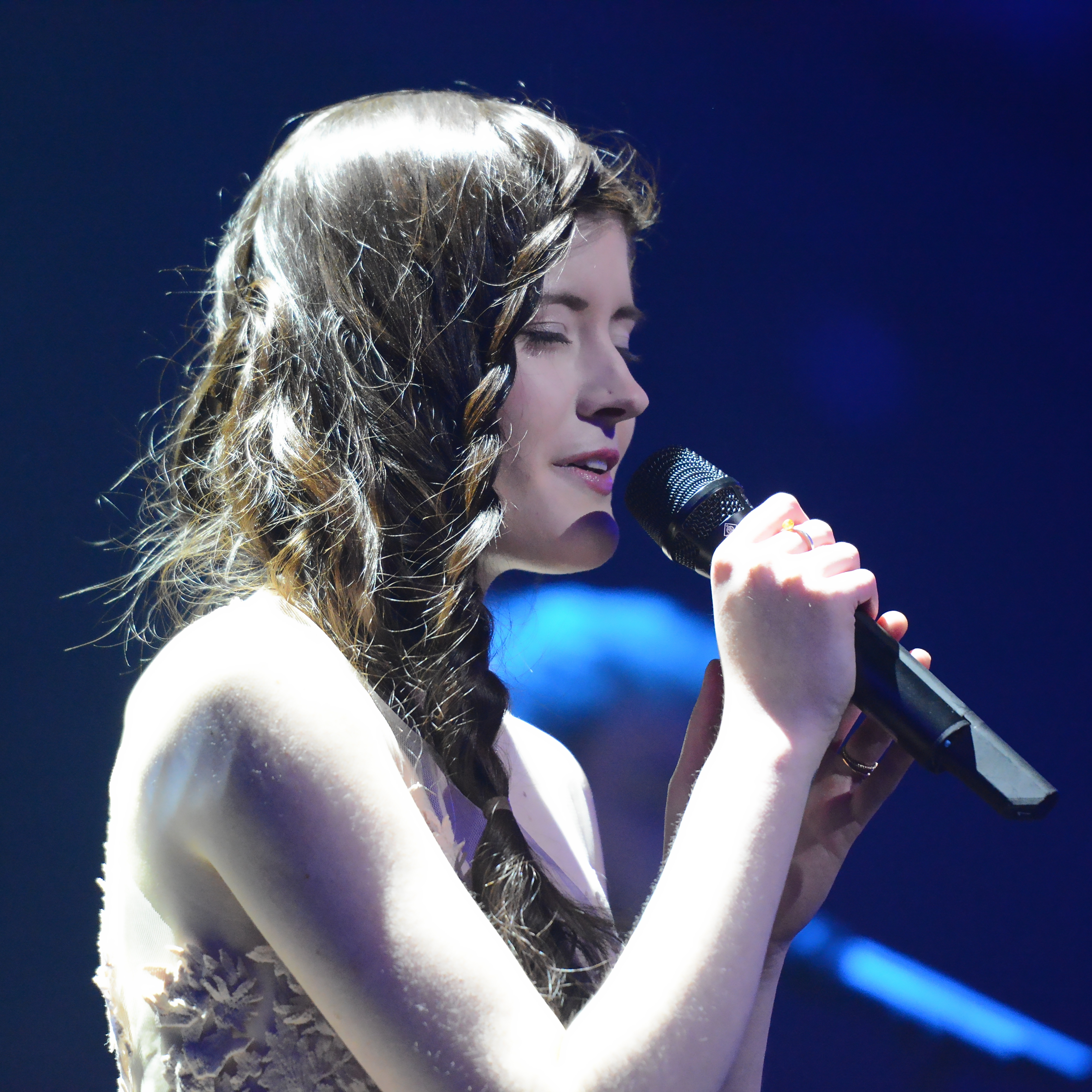
Madeline Juno, 2014

- Wolfgang Dachstein (1487–1553), organist, composer and lyricist; worked in favour of the reformation.
- Lorenz Oken (1779–1851), naturalist.
- Johann Hofer (1810–1880), lawyer, lived and died here
- Josef Kohler (1849–1919), a German jurist, author and poet.
- Baron Lothar von Seebach (1853–1930), painter, designer, water-colourist and engraver.
- Artur Dinter (1876–1948), writer and Nazi politician, died locally
- Kurt Baschwitz (1886–1968), journalist
- Emil Sutor (1888–1974), sculptor, gold medallist in the 1936 Art competitions at the Summer Olympics
- Hermann Vallendor (1894–1974), World War I flying ace
- Hans Furler (1904–1975), politician
- Otto Kumm (1909–2004), senior officer of the Waffen SS, died locally
- Aenne Burda (1909–2005), publisher and honorary citizen
- Hanns Martin Schleyer (1915–1977), manager, employer and industry representative
- Hubert Burda (born 1940), publisher and honorary citizen
- Jürgen Todenhöfer (born 1940), author, journalist, politician, and executive
- Jonas Alber (born 1969), conductor and violinist
- Dirk von Lowtzow (born 1971), musician, singer and guitarist with rock band Tocotronic
- Michael Kaeshammer (born 1977), Canadian pianist, vocalist and composer
- Madeline Juno (born 1995), singer-songwriter

=== Sport ===
- Christine Gossé (born 1964), a French rower, team bronze medallist at the 1996 Summer Olympics
- Martin Wagner (born 1968), footballer, played 302 games and 6 for Germany
- Atika Bouagaa (born 1982), volleyball player
- Felix Roth (born 1987), a former footballer who played 306 games

== Twin towns – sister cities ==
Offenburg is twinned with:

- Lons-le-Saunier, France (1959)
- Weiz, Austria (1964)
- Borehamwood, England, United Kingdom (1982)
- Altenburg, Germany (1988)
- Olsztyn, Poland (1999)
- Pietra Ligure, Italy (2007)
