= Irene Butter =

German-born American economist and Holocaust survivor (1930–2026)

- Butter, c. 2010
- Born: Irene Hasenberg; December 11, 1930; Berlin, Germany
- Died: October 2, 2026 (aged 95)
- Known for: Holocaust survivor
- Title: Professor Emeritus of Public Health
- Spouse: Charlie Butter
- Children: 2

Academic background
- Education: Duke University (PhD)

Academic work
- Discipline: Public health
- Institutions: University of Michigan

Irene Butter (née Hasenberg; December 11, 1930 – October 2, 2026) was a German-American public health scholar and Holocaust survivor. A German Jew, she survived the Westerbork transit camp and the Bergen-Belsen concentration camp in her youth. Thanks to a prisoner exchange arranged by her father, she left Bergen-Belsen with her family at the beginning of 1945, and eventually settled in the United States.

She was professor emeritus of public health at the University of Michigan and a peace activist who informed over decades as an eyewitness of the Holocaust.

== Life and career ==
=== Early life ===
Irene Hasenberg and her brother Werner were born in Berlin to John and Gertrude Hasenberg. They were a family of bankers including her father and his grandfather before him. The small family practiced Reform Judaism, was fully assimilated into the local culture, and considered themselves German.

==== Amsterdam ====
In 1937, her father's bank was taken away from him "because of its Jewish ownership" and soon other assaults followed, which caused her father to move his family to Amsterdam in December 1937. In May 1940, the Wehrmacht invaded the Benelux States. The Netherlands surrendered on May 14. The Nazi regime established the Reichskommissariat Niederlande and pursued its racially based, ideologically driven tyranny there. New hostilities against Dutch Jews followed, and her father made arrangements to get foreign travel documents from a Swedish businessman, an effort that paid off in the weeks that followed.

==== Detention camps ====
Before the new passports arrived, German occupiers deported the Hasenberg family from Amsterdam to nearby Westerbork transit camp in February 1944. In the camp, Irene reconnected with some acquaintances from the Jewish neighborhood where she had lived in Amsterdam, including her friend Hanneli Goslar as well as Hanneli's close friend Anne Frank.

It was in Westerbork that her father received a package forwarded from his Amsterdam address containing Ecuadorian travel documents for each member of the family. Because they had acquired safe new national identities, they were moved from Westerbork to a special section of Bergen-Belsen camp for foreigners and from there they were sent, about a year later, to Switzerland as part of an exchange for German citizens. However, her father died before leaving Germany from injuries inflicted by his Bergen-Belsen captors.

Irene was fourteen and weighed only 79 pounds (36 kg) when she was sent to an Algerian refugee camp of the United Nations Relief and Rehabilitation Administration, where she could eat and recover from her mental and physical hardship. With the help of American relatives, she was sent to the United States and on Christmas Eve of 1945, she arrived in Baltimore, Maryland. Six months later she was reunited with her mother Gertrude and brother Werner, who made the crossing from Europe to the United States by plane.

=== Education and career ===
Armed with a college scholarship, Hasenberg focused on her education and attended Queens College in New York. She then earned a Ph.D. in economics from Duke University, becoming one of the first women to do so. She married Charlie Butter, whom she had met during her studies; they had two children.

Irene and Charlie Butter were hired by the University of Michigan in 1966 and moved with their family to Ann Arbor, Michigan. Her courses "[highlighted] the influence of race, gender, and poverty on health status, and the central role of child and family health in achieving a healthy community many years before they became standard topics in public health teaching". From the 1960s into the 1990s, Butter published multiple articles on health care in the U.S., with a focus on midwifery and women's health.

In 1996, Butter was granted Emeritus status upon her retirement. She continued to publish academic papers.

=== Holocaust education ===
After her arrival in the U.S., she was told that it would be wise to keep silent about the Holocaust and her war experiences in Germany and the Netherlands. When her high school daughter Pamela proposed a school project in 1976 about Irene's war experiences, Butter relented and told her stories to Pamela as well as the entire class. The positive feedback she received encouraged her to expand her talks to wider audiences, including a panel discussion about the diarist Anne Frank, who died in German captivity.

She informed as an eyewitness over decades, especially in American and German schools. She commented:

From inner city schools in Detroit, schools in Ann Arbor, and rural middle schools in Dexter, students in what has become my home state of Michigan are ready to hear a message of standing up against hatred, bullying, oppression, and discrimination. Students recognize that all of us are responsible for each other, regardless of our color, religion, or race. The idea of never a bystander, of standing up for others, even when they aren't members of your tribe, is a strong theme in my life's work.”

She co-founded the Raoul Wallenberg Lectures at the University of Michigan, which honors the Swedish diplomat who is known to have saved thousands of Jews. On the jury of the Raoul Wallenberg Medal, she supported the medal for people who fought with courage for seemingly lost causes, such as the Dalai Lama. She also participated in Zeituna, an Arab-Jewish dialogue group of women. In 2020, the Deutsches Schauspielhaus in Hamburg gave an evening with her in interview and actors reading from her memoir, Shores beyond Shores. From Holocaust to Hope.

In 2024, she received the Order of Merit of the Federal Republic of Germany, Germany's highest civilian honor. She received the Dutch Government's Anne Frank Award in 2025 for her work in Holocaust education.

=== Death ===
Butter died on October 2, 2026, at the age of 95. Wolfram Weimer, German Minister of State for Culture, stated that she was an inspiring voice of remembrance and a tireless champion of peace who was engaged over decades for enlightenment, peace, and understanding."

== Publications ==
=== Scientific articles ===
- Butter, Irene Hasenberg. Economics of graduate education: an exploratory study. University of Michigan, Department of Economics, 1966.
- Butter, Irene (1967). "Health Manpower Research: A Survey". Inquiry. 4 (4): 5–41. ISSN 0046-9580.
- Butter, Irene (1971). "The migratory flow of doctors to and from the United States". Medical care: 17–31.
- Butter, Irene; Schaffner, Richard (1971). "Foreign medical graduates and equal access to medical care". Medical Care: 136–143.
- Butter, I H (April 1983). "Income differentials among primary care physicians: organizational structure or deliberate choice?". American Journal of Public Health. 73 (4): 362–363. doi:10.2105/AJPH.73.4.362. ISSN 0090-0036. PMC 1650767. PMID 6829818.
- Butter, Irene; Lapre, Ruud (1986). "Obstetric care in the Netherlands: Manpower substitution and differential costs". The International Journal of Health Planning and Management. 1 (2): 89–110. doi:10.1002/hpm.4740010203. ISSN 1099-1751.
- Butter, Irene H.; Carpenter, Eugenia S.; Kay, Bonnie J.; Simmons, Ruth S. (January 1, 1987). "Gender Hierarchies in the Health Labor Force". International Journal of Health Services. 17 (1): 133–149. doi:10.2190/0UQ0-WV6P-2R6V-2QDQ. ISSN 0020-7314.
- Kay, Bonnie J.; Butter, Irene H.; Chang, Deborah; Houlihan, Kathleen (April 1, 1988). "Women's Health and Social Change: The Case of Lay Midwives". International Journal of Health Services. 18 (2): 223–236. doi:10.2190/MUVW-3R3K-2725-DGH4. ISSN 0020-7314.
- Butter, I H; Kay, B J (September 1988). "State laws and the practice of lay midwifery". American Journal of Public Health. 78 (9): 1161–1169. doi:10.2105/AJPH.78.9.1161. ISSN 0090-0036. PMC 1349386. PMID 3407812.
- Butter, Irene H.; Kay, Bonnie J. (January 1, 1990). "Self-certification in lay midwives' organizations: A vehicle for professional autonomy". Social Science & Medicine. 30 (12): 1329–1339. doi:10.1016/0277-9536(90)90313-H. hdl:2027.42/28948. ISSN 0277-9536.
- Butter, Irene H. (1993). "Premature adoption and routinization of medical technology: Illustrations from childbirth technology". Journal of Social Issues. 49 (2): 11–34.
- Torres, Roberto E.; Butter, Irene H. (June 1, 1996). "The Impact of EEG Technology on Health Manpower". American Journal of Electroneurodiagnostic Technology. 36 (2): 114–132. doi:10.1080/1086508X.1996.11080544. ISSN 1086-508X.

=== Memoir ===
- Butter, Irene and John D. Bedwell - Co-author: Kris Holloway, Shores beyond Shores, From Holocaust to Hope, My True Story, Uitgave Can of Worms, Londen/NY, Nov. 2019, ISBN 978-1-9161908-0-1.

=== Chapters ===
- Butter, Irene H.; Carpenter, Eugenia S.; Kay, Bonnie J.; Simmons, Ruth S. (1994). "Gender Hierarchies in the Health Labor Force". In Fee, Elizabeth; Krieger, Nancy (eds.). Women's Health, Politics, and Power. Taylor & Francis. doi:10.4324/9781315231020-7/gender-hierarchies-health-labor-force-irene-butter-eugenia-carpenter-bonnie-kay-ruth-simmons.

=== Film ===
- Never a Bystander (2014) short documentary film about Butter by American filmmaker Evelyn Neuhaus.
