= Alan Posener =

British-German journalist

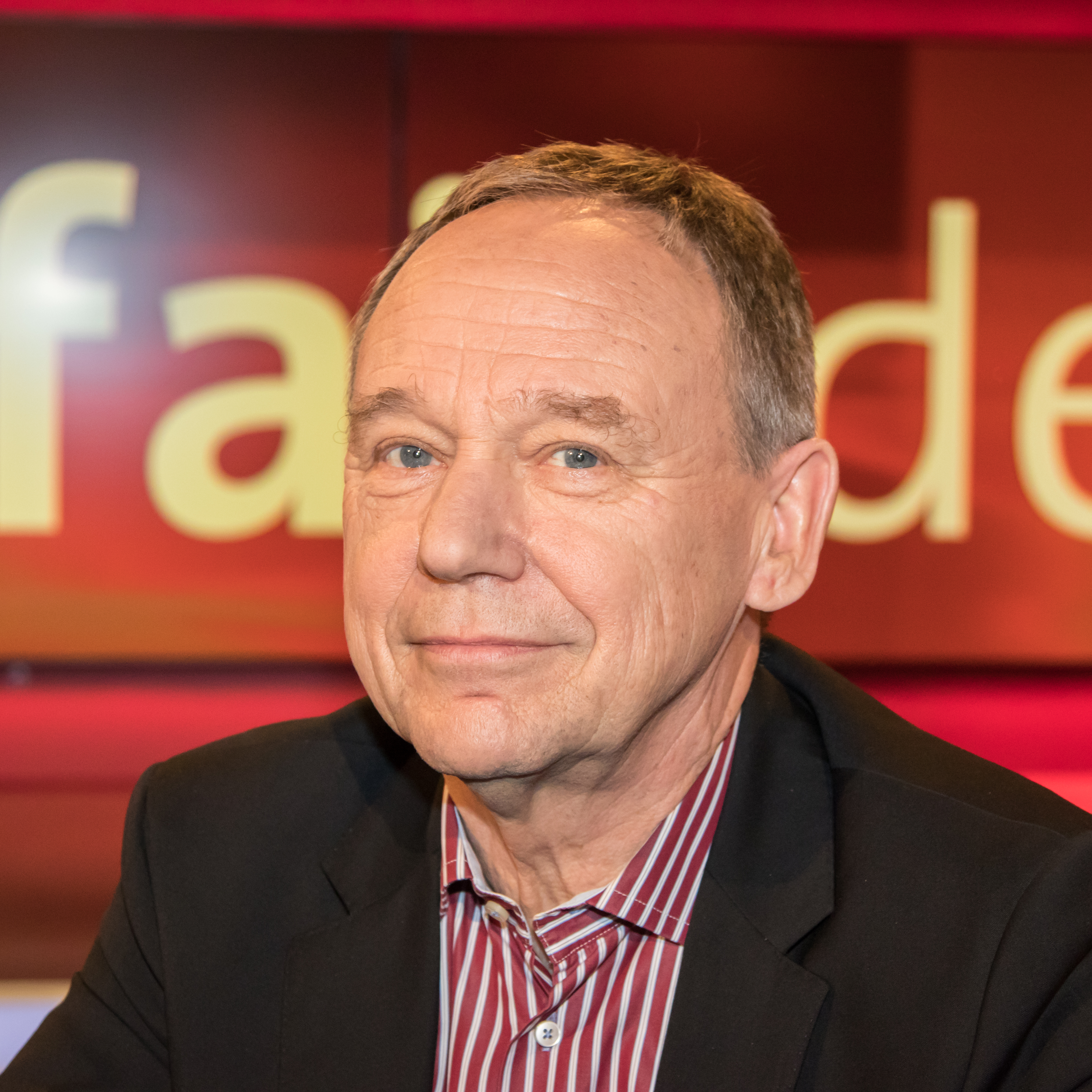
Posener in 2016

Alan Posener (born 8 October 1949 in Hampstead, London) is a British-German journalist. He is the son of the architectural historian Julius Posener.

== Biography ==
Posener is the son of a liberal German-Jewish family, while his mother is of Scottish-English ancestry. Posener's sister is the photographer Jill Posener. He grew up in England, Malaysia and Germany. He studied German studies and English at the Free University of Berlin and the Ruhr University of Bochum. During this period he served as Executive of the Communist Students Association and the Maoist Communist Party.

On graduation, Posener worked as a teacher at the Kant-Gymnasium (Berlin) and at the Martin Buber Comprehensive School in Berlin-Spandau. He left the teaching profession, as he says, because of "boredom".

=== Journalism ===
In 1987 he wrote the Rowohlt monograph on John Lennon. This was followed by monographs on John F. Kennedy, Elvis Presley, William Shakespeare, Franklin Roosevelt, and finally Mary, the mother of Jesus. Posener also wrote a biography of the relationship of John F. and Jackie Kennedy.

From 1999 to 2004, he was a writer at and then editor of Die Welt. From 2004 to 2008, he was chief of commentary for Welt am Sonntag. He now works as a correspondent for politics and society. When, in 2005, the Berlin authorities proposed renaming Kochstraße as Rudi Dutschke Strasse, he opposed the proposition. Posener stated that:

as Rudi Dutschke thought nothing of, "capitalism and consumerism, liberalism and parliamentarism," it was no coincidence that his fellow Horst Mahler (then a member of the same far-left organisation as Posener) ended up in the NPD

In May 2007, Posener used his blog at Welt Online to attack the editor of the tabloid "Bild," Kai Diekmann, accusing him of "hypocrisy" because the newspaper "serves the lowest instincts." The comment was removed a few hours later after colleagues at the Axel Springer publishing house, which is the publisher of both titles, had noticed it. Rival newspapers later printed their own critical commentaries on the tensions evident at Axel Springer Verlag.

In 2009 he published his book "Pope Benedict's crusade", in which he criticized Benedict XVI's "crusade" against the Enlightenment. An expanded and retitled version, now also available as a paperback, appeared in 2011 under the punchier title "Der gefährliche Papst" ("The Dangerous Pope"). Building on his criticism, he now also stirred controversy by spelling out a more general thesis: "Religion ist schlecht für den Menschen" ("Religion is bad for humanity").

Since 2009, Posener has conducted a weekly debate with Alexander Görlach on religious and ethical questions in The European.
