= Ingrid Bodsch =

Austrian historian

- Born: January 22, 1953 (age 73); Graz
- Occupations: Historian, museum curator

Ingrid Bodsch (born 22 January 1953) is an Austrian historian and faculty at the Stadtmuseum Bonn (Bonn city museum).

== Biography ==
After graduating from gymnasium at the Convent of the Ursulines, Graz and from the University of Graz with a degree in history and art, Bodsch continued her studies at the University of Bonn. She completed a Master of Arts there in 1977. From 1977 to 1981, Bodsch was a research associate at the University of Bonn for professors Paul Egon Hübinger and Eugen Ewig. From 1981 to 1985, Bodsch was an assistant researcher at the Schnütgen Museum in Cologne under Anton Legner.

Bodsch married molecular biologist Wolfram Bodsch in 1977 and accompanied him on his research trips to the United States, where she would find herself working at the Getty Museum from 1986 to 1988 and the Metropolitan Museum of Art.

Bodsch completed her doctorate in 1988 at the University of Bonn, and was then commissioned to plan and execute the 2000th anniversary of the founding of Jülich. Since its reestablishment in 1989, Bodsch has been the part of the management staff of the Stadtmuseum Bonn.

From 2003 to 2007, Bodsch was the spokesperson of the German Museum Association. In 2005, she was assigned the directorship of the Schumann Network by the Federal Government Commissioner for Culture and the Media, Bernd Neumann. In 2010, she coordinated the Schumann Year Celebrations to commemorate Robert Schumann's 200th birthday.
