= EYZ =

EYZ or eyz may refer to:

== EYZ ==
- EYZ Media, winner of the 2007 Innovationspreis des Beauftragten für Kultur und Medien
- EYZ, three-letter vehicle registration plates of Northern Ireland sequence issued for Coleraine

== eyz ==
- eyz, the Alcuinic name for the Gothic alphabet letter 𐌴
