= Ernst-Moritz-Arndt-Haus =

German museum

Coordinates: 50.7289°N 7.1108°E

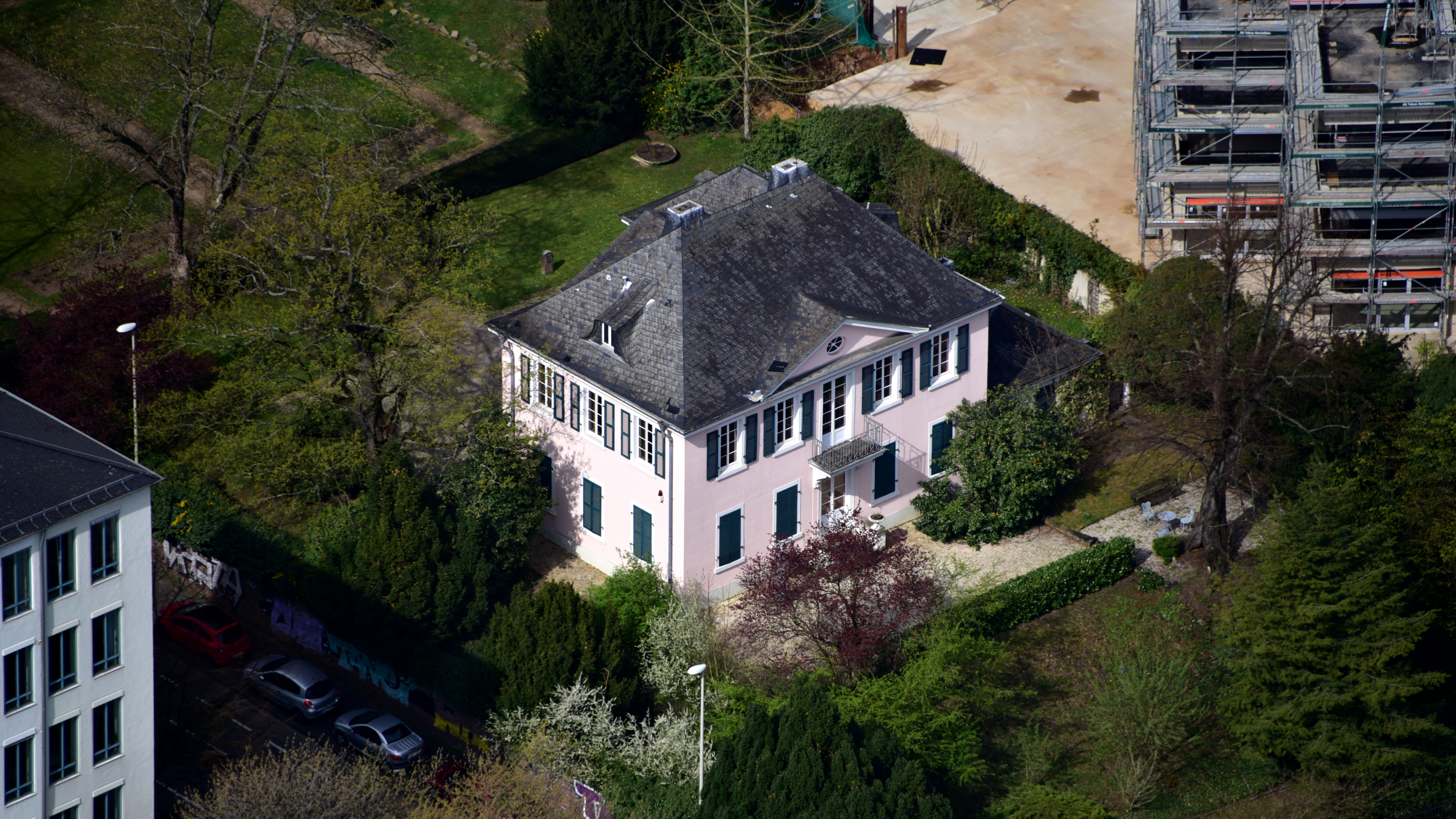
Aerial view (2018)

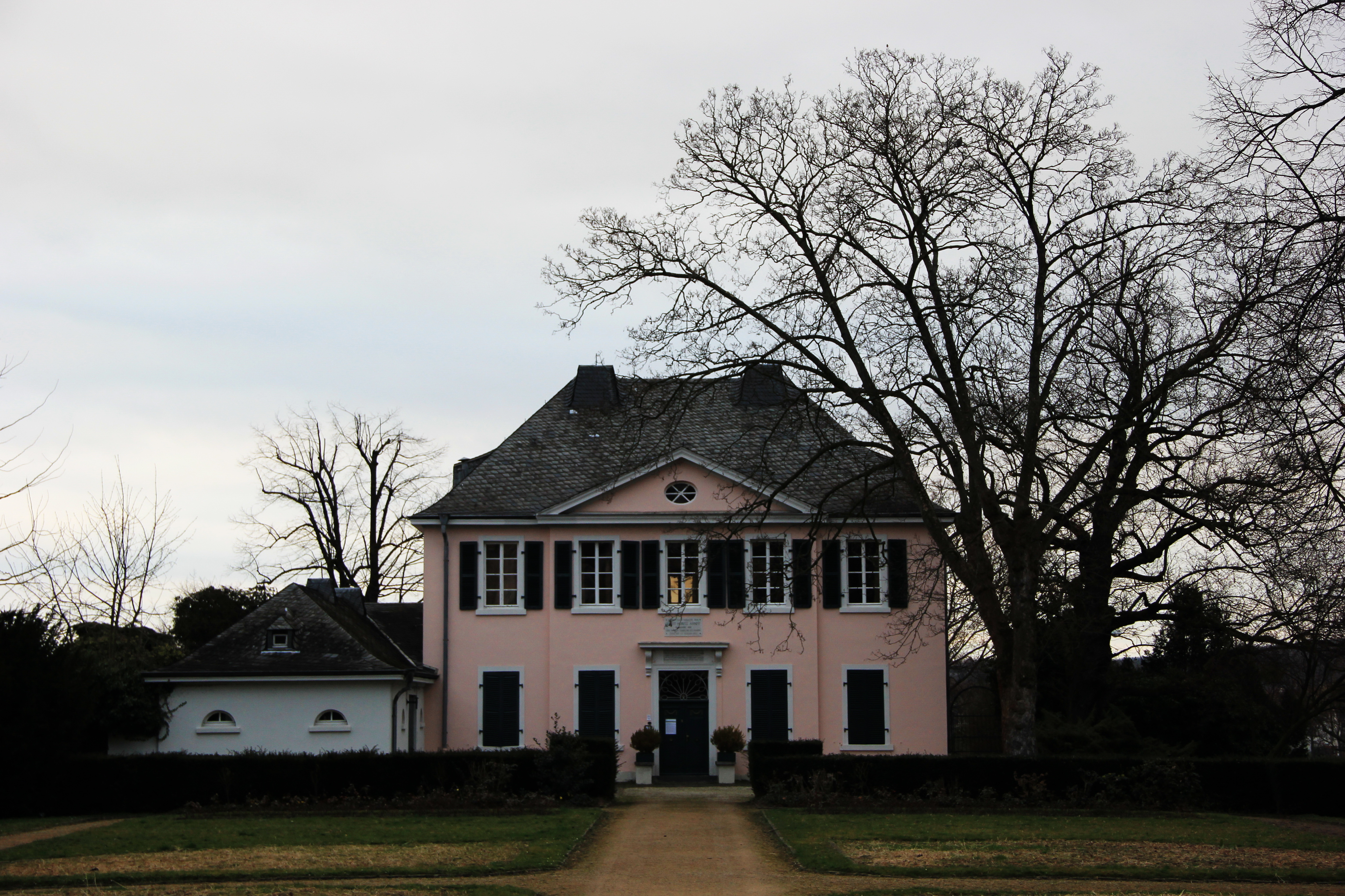
Front façade of the villa in 2015

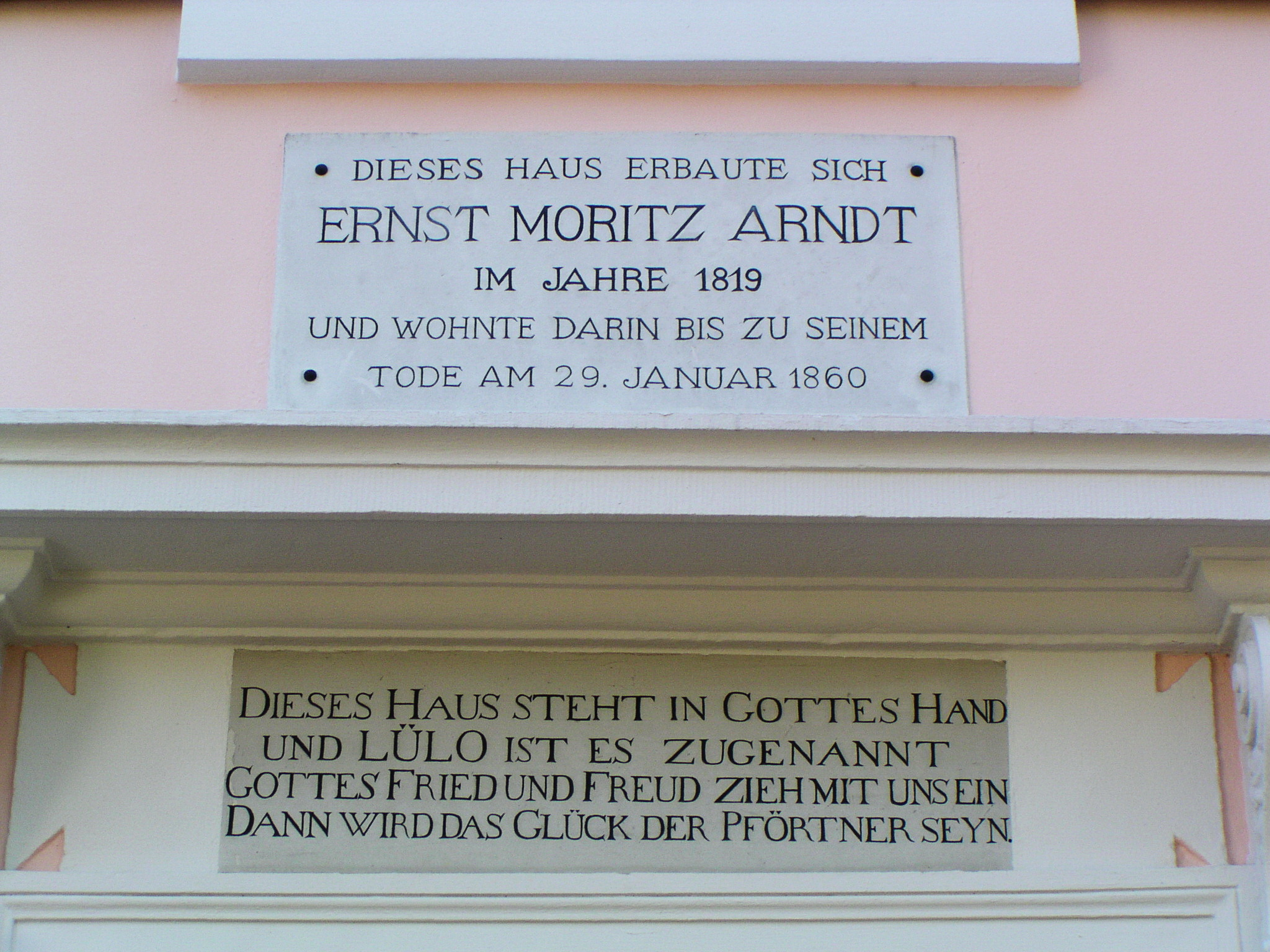
Inscriptions on the house

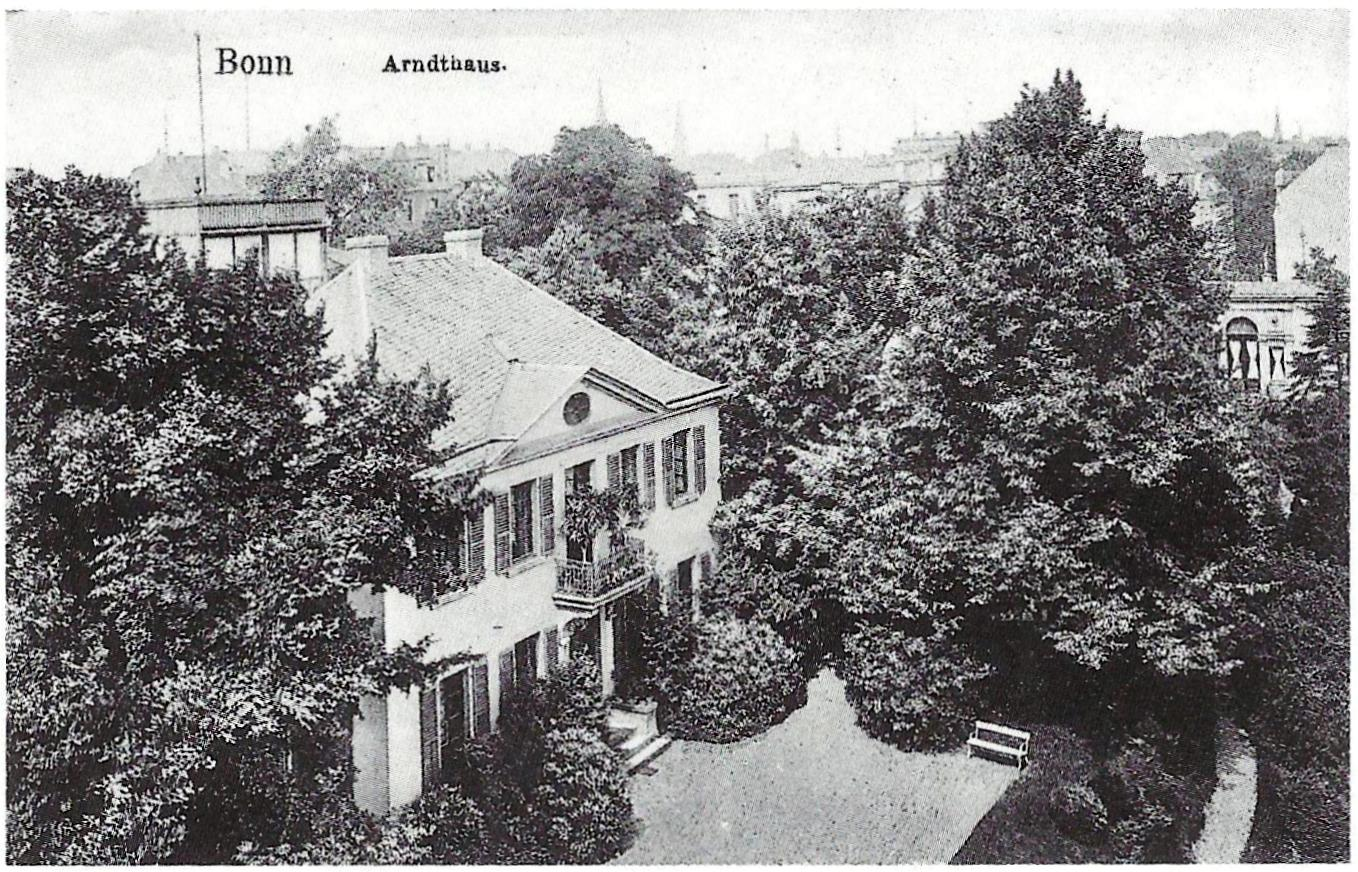
The rear façade facing the small garden; photo around 1900

The Ernst-Moritz-Arndt-Haus in the Bonn district of Südstadt was built for the poet Ernst Moritz Arndt.

The 19th-century building is Bonn's oldest Rhine villa and is now used as a branch of the Stadtmuseum Bonn. It is located at Adenauerallee 79, about 50 metres (160 ft) from the Rhine bank. The villa is listed under Denkmalschutz.

== History ==
Ernst Moritz Arndt had the villa built from January 1819 at the latest in a wine-growing area outside the city walls of the time. The builder had been appointed professor of modern history at the newly founded and nearby Rheinische Friedrich-Wilhelms-Universität Bonn in Bonn in 1818 and had acquired two vineyards on a hill directly on the Rhine in the same year. The Royal Prussian Building Inspector Friedrich Waesemann was engaged as architect. The Arndt family moved into the house as early as October 1819, even before the interior work was completed the following February and the pink paint was finished in September 1820. Arndt lived in the villa until his death in 1860. Since 1867, the building has been owned by the city of Bonn.

The Neoclassicism designed villa is situated on an approximately 6,000 m^{2} (65,000 sq ft) rectangular plot of land extending from the Adenauerallee to the Rheinuferstraße (here Rathenauufer); the villa is located at the eastern end of the park-like grounds, above the Rhine. The building stands on a rectangular ground plan, consisting of two above-ground floors and a high hip roof. The front and rear façades are articulated in five axes, with a three-axis avant-corps protruding from the front, crowned by a triangular gable. This gable is also found at the rear, but here without a risalit. On the north side of the villa, there is a one-storey, also hipped-roofed, utility and garage building.

An inscription in the door cornice of the front facade refers, according to the builder, to "a sweet spot" in the Rügen homeland. Presumably a small oak grove of the same name near Arndt's birthplace Groß Schoritz is meant.

This house is in God's hand and Lülo is the name of it[.] God's peace and joy will move in with us[,] then happiness will be the gatekeeper

Since 1989, the Bonn City Museum, founded in that year, has continued to use the villa for special exhibitions, concerts and readings.

== Museum ==
In addition to being used for events or exhibitions, the Arndt Villa is run as a museum. On the ground floor, a room is furnished with furniture from the estate of Ernst Moritz Arndt; there are also several contemporary portraits of the poet. The upper floor is furnished in the Biedermeier style, in keeping with the period of construction. The museum and the exhibitions are managed by Ingrid Bodsch.

== Exhibitions ==
- Internationale Künstler in Bonn 1700–1860: Bildende Kunst zur Zeit der Kurfürsten Joseph Clemens und Clemens August, September 1984, Exhibition of the City Archive and the Scientific City Library Bonn.
- Jakob Wassermann (1873 bis 1934): Ein Weg als Deutscher und Jude, Oktober bis November 1984, Ausstellung anlässlich des 50. Todestages, Städtische Kunstsammlung Bonn.
- Joseph von Eichendorff (1788–1857): Ich bin mit der Revolution geboren, July 1988, Ausstellung der Eichendorff-Gesellschaft.
- Diverse Sonderausstellungen zum Bonner Robert Schumann seit 1993: Robert Schumann und die Dichter, Album für die Jugend, Clara und Robert Schumann: Zeitgenössische Portraits, Clara Schumann (1996), An den Rhein, an den Rhein (2002), Zwischen Poesie und Musik: Robert Schumann – früh und spät (2006), Robert Schumann – Lebensstationen, Wohnorte und Reiseziele (2010).
- Sibylle Mertens-Schaaffhausen (1797–1857): Zum 150. Todestag der „Rheingräfin“, September bis November 2007, Ausstellung des Stadtmuseums Bonn
- Wesendoncks in Bonn? Die Wesendonckschen Familienporträts im Bestand des Stadtmuseums Bonn. Wagners Muse und ihre Familie, October 2013 to February 2014, exhibition on Mathilde Wesendonck's family.
- Mord in Bonn vor 150 Jahren: Der Koch, die Könige und der letzte deutsche Sommer vor Bismarck, May to August 2015, exhibition on German-English relations from the second half of the 19th century to the First World War.
