= Wolfram Weimer =

German publisher and journalist (born 1964)

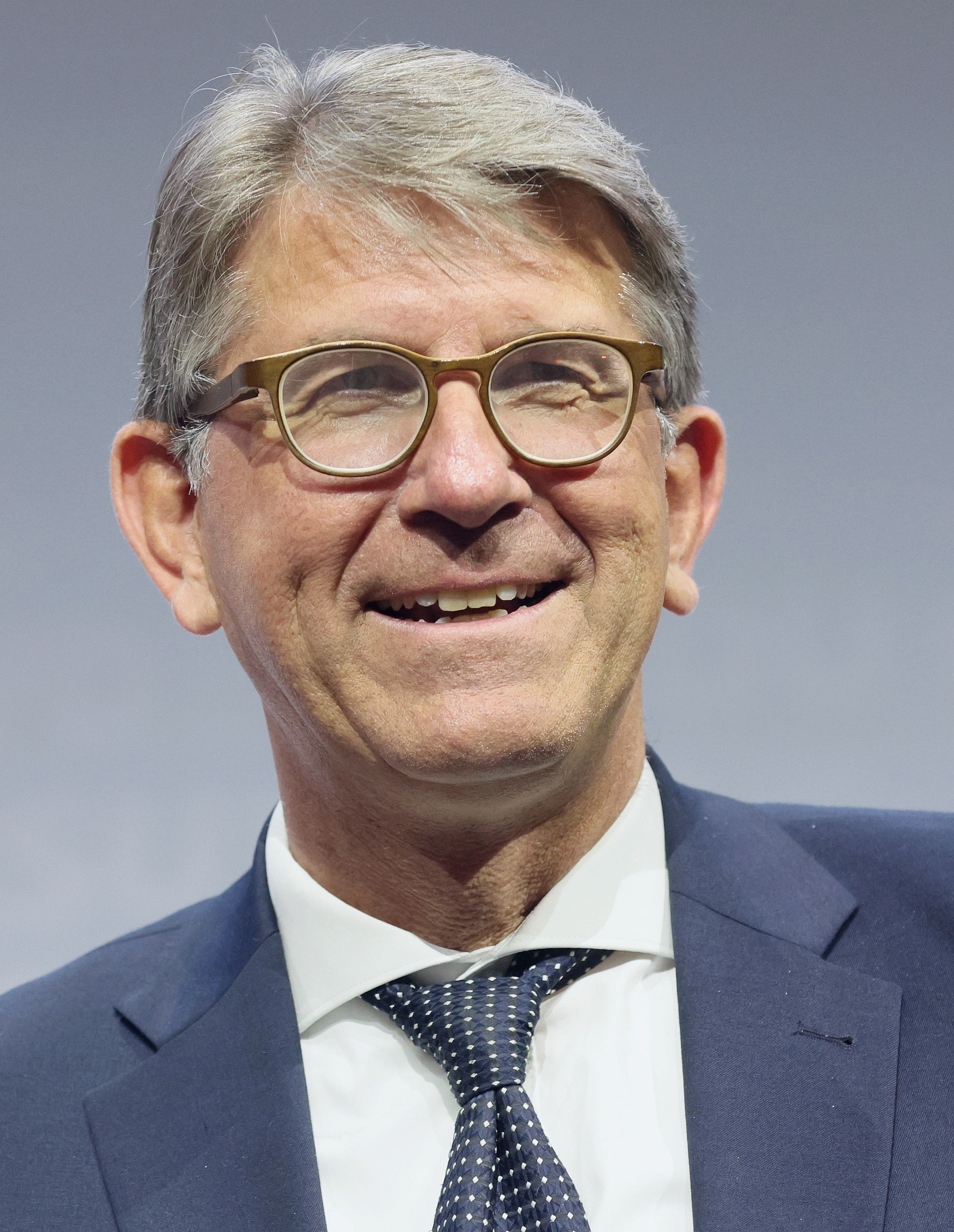
- Weimer in 2025
- Born: 11 November 1964 (age 62), Gelnhausen, West Germany
- Education: University of Frankfurt (MA, PhD)
- Occupations: Publisher, Journalist
- Title: Editor-in-chief of Die Welt and Berliner Morgenpost, Focus, and the magazine Cicero, Founder of Weimer Media Group

Wolfram Robert Wilhelm Weimer (born 11 November 1964) is a German politician and journalist. He was editor-in-chief of Die Welt and Berliner Morgenpost, Focus, and the magazine Cicero, which he founded. In 2012, he and his wife, journalist and publisher Christiane Goetz-Weimer, founded the Weimer Media Group, which publishes titles such as Business Punk, Pardon, The European and WirtschaftsKurier. Since May 2025, Weimer is the Federal Government Commissioner for Culture and the Media in the government of Chancellor Friedrich Merz, as successor to Claudia Roth.

== Early life and education ==
Wolfram Weimer was born in 1964 in Gelnhausen, to Alois Weimer. His father was a German and religion teacher in Portugal from 1966 to 1972. Wolfram Weiner attended the German School in Porto. In 1983, he graduated from the Grimmelshausen Gymnasium in Gelnhausen with the highest grade average. During his school days, Weimer founded the student newspaper Schwarzer Elch, wrote for the Gelnhäuser Tageblatt from 1980 and for the Main-Kinzig-Nachrichten from 1981.

From 1983 to 1984, he completed his military service in the German Armed Forces. In 1986, Weimer published a poetry collection titled Kopfpilz (Head Fungus).

Weimer studied history, German language and literature, political science, and economics. In 1986, he received a scholarship from the American University in Washington, D.C., as well as a scholarship from the Konrad Adenauer Foundation. In 1989, he earned a Master of Arts degree from the Goethe University in Frankfurt am Main.

A year of research in Washington resulted in a dissertation (Magna cum laude) published under the title Die Kontroverse um die Bank of North America 1783–1787 (The Controversy over the Bank of North America, 1783–1787). In 1998, Weimer received a research fellowship from the John F. Kennedy Institute for North American Studies in Berlin.

== Career ==
After completing his studies, he worked as an intern at the dpa in Washington. Weimer was business editor of the Frankfurter Allgemeine Zeitung in Frankfurt from 1990 to 1994, from 1994 to 1998 he was correspondent for the FAZ in Madrid, from 1998 to 2000 he was deputy editor-in-chief of the daily newspaper Die Welt in Berlin, from 2000 to 2001 he was editor-in-chief and from 2001 to 2002 he was co-editor-in-chief of the Welt and the Berliner Morgenpost. He left Axel Springer AG at the end of 2002.

In 2003, Weimer won over Swiss media company Ringier with his idea of developing a new German political magazine based in Potsdam. The magazine Cicero was first published in April 2004. The model for the political and cultural magazine was the American The New Yorker. He remained editor-in-chief of the magazine until January 2010.

In fall 2009, Burda Publishing recruited Weimer as the new editor-in-chief of the news magazine Focus, becoming the successor to Helmut Markwort. Under his leadership, Focus was repositioned and began a collaboration with the Economist. After leaving Focus, Weimer founded his own publishing house, the Weimer Media Group, in 2012.

Since 2015, Weimer has been the publisher of the magazine The European.

In April 2025, Chancellor-designate Friedrich Merz announced that Weimer would become the new Minister of State for Culture in his government.

== Political positions ==
Weimer's political positions were described as conservative, liberal-conservative, and neoconservative. He advocates for economic liberalism and calls for a reduction in the size of government and comprehensive deregulation.

Referring to Oswald Spengler, Weimer views the European continent as being in a phase of cultural decline. He suggests that Europe is like an extinguishing volcano, still hissing in places, and that its impressive cultural crater landscape hints at its former greatness. However, he argues that Europe has lost its "vital energy." Whereas generation after generation once naturally understood the continuation of their own family, "bloodline," tribe, nation, culture, and civilization as a "sacred aspect" ("heiliger Moment") of life over thousands of years, this consciousness, according to Weimer, has now suddenly shattered.

As one cause for the end of Europe's cultural "supremacy," Weimer points to the way the legacy of colonialism has been handled. He asserts that Europe no longer expands territorially, and that the landslide-like loss of power following decolonization was not even mourned. Instead, he claims, Europeans regarded their colonial history with moral guilt as an illegitimate expansion. Even today, he says, school curricula present and criticize the darker side of colonization as a continuous “original sin” (“Sündenfall”).

Regarding migration, Weimer diagnoses a naive multiculturalism and speaks of a "multi-culti lie" ("Multi-Kulti-Lüge"). Multiculturalism, he writes, is the attempt to eradicate old national instincts with many döner kebab shops, diligent immigration, and the veneration of "Kanak-German," in order to mentally reverse the Nazi catastrophe, so to speak — a kind of reparations through "cultural self-destruction" ("Wiedergutmachung durch kulturelle Selbstzerstörung").

Weimer generally views a "return of religion" positively and sees it as an opportunity for a cultural renaissance of the Western world. For him, religion and conservatism are inextricably linked.

In 2017, he described UNESCO as "as corrupt as FIFA" and ideologically controlled by despots, Islamists, and left-wing ecologists.

On 15 June 2022, Weimer appeared as a guest on the talk show Maischberger and declared that Russia had already won the war against Ukraine. He said that the West had also lost the "international battle for majorities" and that Berlin must present a peace plan.

Weimer supported Friedrich Merz as the CDU candidate in the 2025 German federal election against Hendrick Wüst, a possible alternative from his own party.

According to Brussels Signal, Weimer claimed that "The United States in particular stands for an anti-freedom current" in the greater context of hostilities towards Enlightenment values.

== Personal life ==
Weimer is married to publisher Christiane Goetz-Weimer and has three sons. He lives in Miesbach district on Lake Tegernsee.

== Publications ==
- Die Kontroverse um die Bank of North America 1783–1787, Dissertation. Peter Lang GmbH, 1991, ISBN 978-3-631-44316-3, Seitenzahl: 195.
- Geschichte des Geldes: Eine Chronik mit Texten und Bildern. Suhrkamp, Berlin 1994, ISBN 978-3-518-38807-5
- mit Alois Weimer: Mit Platon zum Profit. Eine Philosophie-Lesebuch für Manager. FAZ, Frankfurt am Main, 1994, ISBN 978-3-92936-829-1
- mit Hans Roeper: Die D-Mark. Eine deutsche Wirtschaftsgeschichte. Societät. Frankfurt am Main 1996, ISBN 978-3-79730-613-5
- Deutsche Wirtschaftsgeschichte. Hofmann & Campe, Hamburg 1999, ISBN 978-3-455-11229-0
- Die Sozialisierungsfalle. FAZ, Frankfurt am Main 1999, ISBN 978-3-92936-897-0
- Das Netzwerk der Vordenker. Ch.Goetz, 2004, ISBN 978-3-98093-490-9
- Credo. Warum die Rückkehr der Religion gut ist. DVA, München 2006, ISBN 978-3-42104-244-6; 2021 neu erschienen im Bonifatius Verlag als: Sehnsucht nach Gott: Warum die Rückkehr der Religion gut für unsere Gesellschaft ist, ISBN 978-3-89710-888-2
- Himmlische Karikaturen. Gütersloher Verlagshaus, 2008, ISBN 978-3-57906-985-2
- Andalusien. Ein Reiselesebuch (Hrsg.), Ellert & Richter Verlag, 2008, ISBN 978-3-8319-0304-7
- Freiheit, Gleichheit, Bürgerlichkeit. Warum die Krise uns konservativ macht. Gütersloher Verlagshaus, 2009, ISBN 978-3-57906-890-9
- Heimspiel – Eine alternativlose Realsatire. Quadriga, Köln 2012, ISBN 978-3-86995-031-0
- Das konservative Manifest. Zehn Gebote der neuen Bürgerlichkeit. Plassen Verlag, Kulmbach 2018, ISBN 978-3-86470-567-0.
- Der vergessene Erfinder: Wie Philipp Reis das Telefon erfand. Ch. Goetz Verlag, 2019, ISBN 978-3-947140-04-6
- Sehnsucht nach Gott : warum die Rückkehr der Religion gut für unsere Gesellschaft ist. Bonifatius Verlag, Paderborn 2021. ISBN 978-3-89710-888-2
