= Bernd Neumann =

German politician (born 1942)

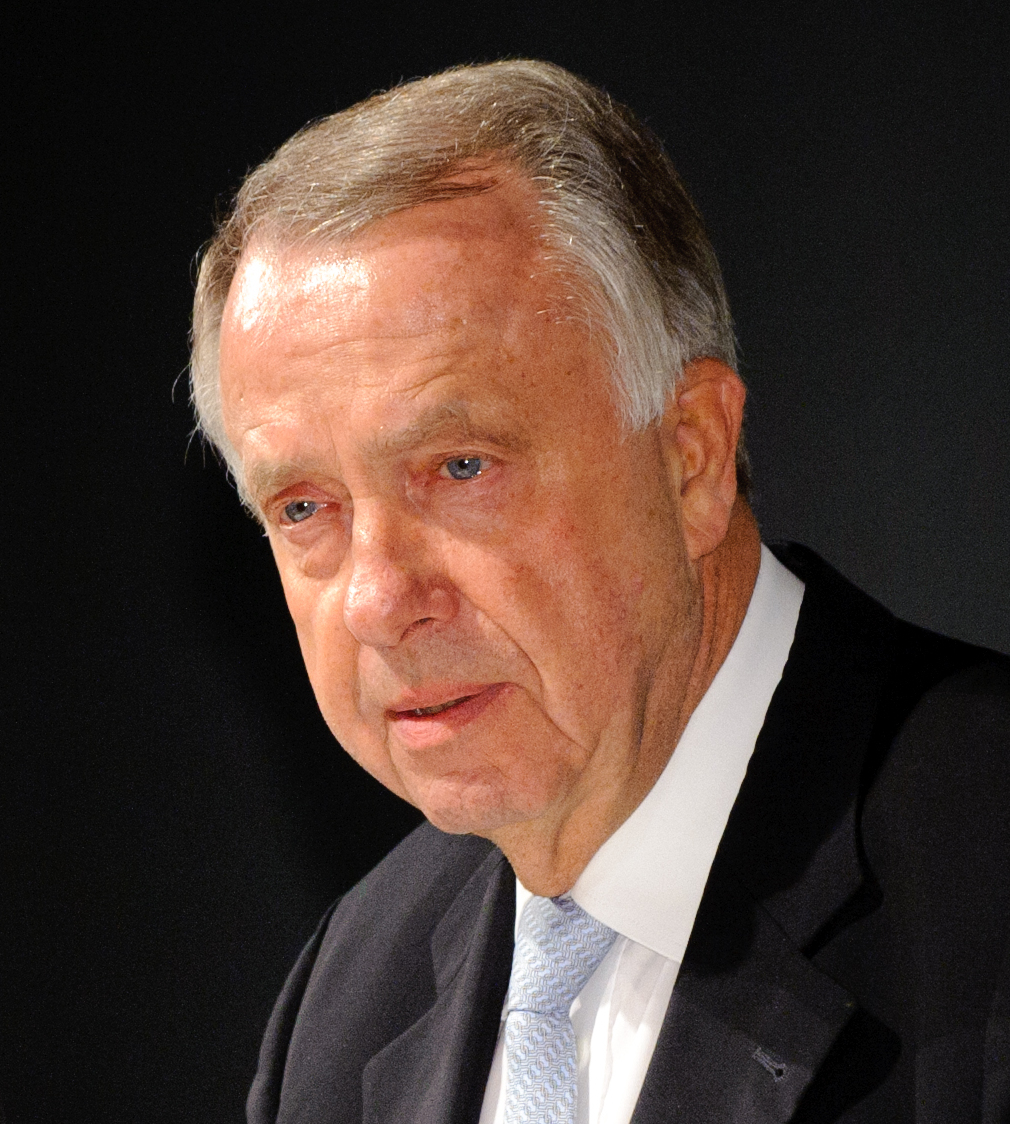
Neumann in 2010)

Bernd Otto Neumann (born 6 January 1942) is a former German politician and since 2014 president of the German Federal Film Board (FFA).

== Biography ==
Neumann was born in Elbing, East Prussia, now Elbląg, Poland. Following the flight and expulsion of Germans after World War II he found refuge in Bremen, West Germany. Neumann studied from 1961 to 1966 at the University of Bremen and later he worked as teacher until 1971 in Bremen. Neumann is married and has two children.

Since 1962, Neumann has been a member of the Christian Democratic Union (CDU). From 1979 to 2008, he led the CDU in Bremen. He was a member of the Bürgerschaft of Bremen from 1971 to 1987. Since 1987, Neumann has been a member of the Bundestag. He served from 1991 to 1998 as Secretary of State in the Federal Ministry of Research and Technology. From November 2005 until December 2013, Neumann was the Minister of State at the German Chancellery and Representative of the Federal Government for Culture. At the 2009 federal election, he unsuccessfully contested the Bremen II – Bremerhaven constituency, but was elected from the land list.

== See also ==
- Cabinet Kohl IV
- Cabinet Kohl V
- Merkel Cabinet
