= Julian Nida-Rümelin =

German philosopher (born 1954)

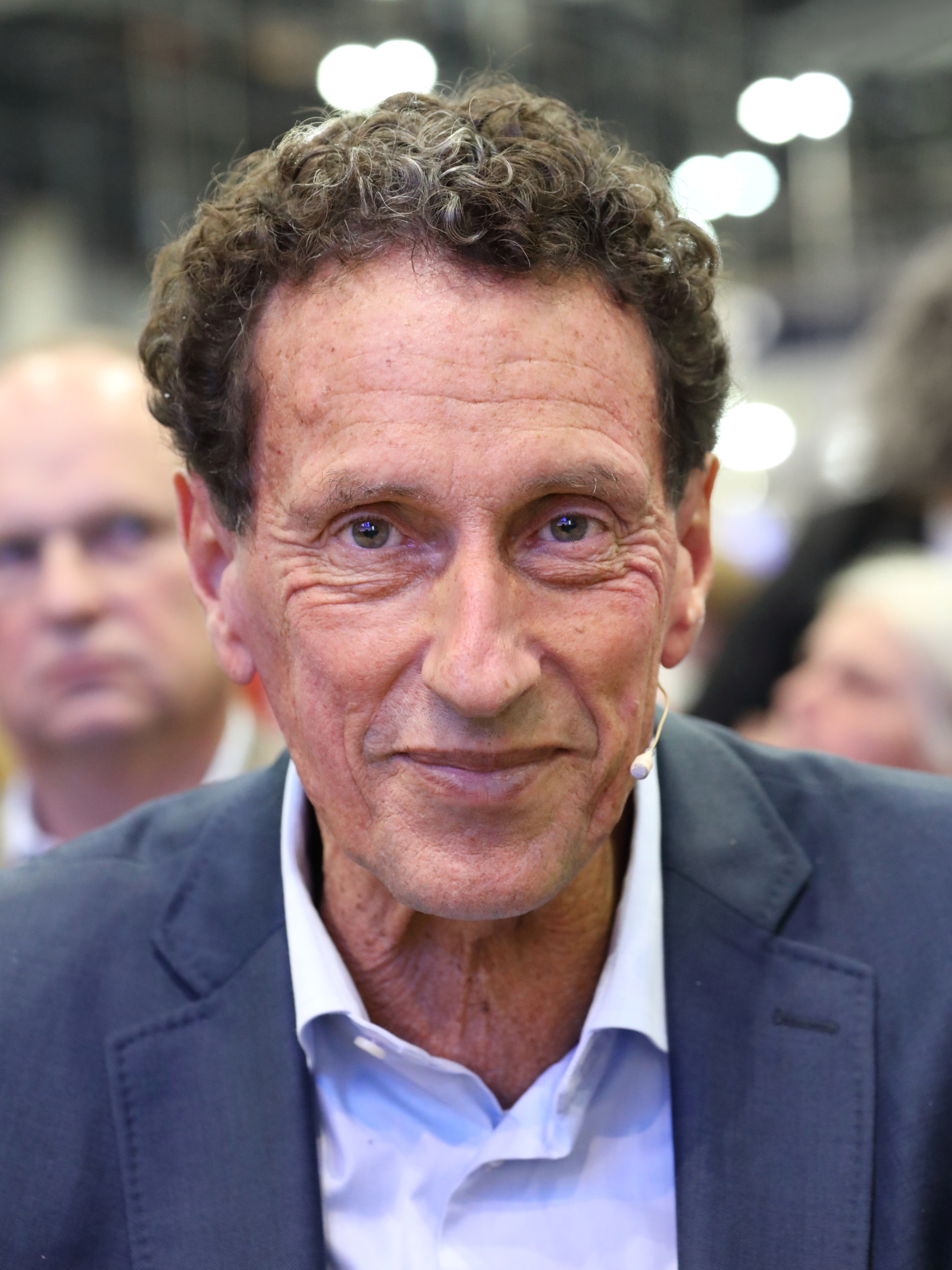
- Nida-Rümelin in 2024

Minister of State for Culture and the Media
- In office 10 January 2001 – 22 October 2002
- Chancellor: Gerhard Schröder
- Preceded by: Michael Naumann (2000)
- Succeeded by: Christina Weiss

Culture Commissioner of Munich
- In office July 1998 – January 2001
- Mayor: Christian Ude
- Preceded by: Siegfried Hummel
- Succeeded by: Lydia Hartl

Personal details
- Born: Julian Nida-Rümelin; 28 November 1954 (age 71) Munich, West Germany (now Germany)
- Party: Social Democratic Party
- Education: LMU Munich; University of Tübingen
- Occupation: Philosopher; politician; academic
- Website: julian-nida-ruemelin.com

Julian Nida-Rümelin (born 28 November 1954) is a German philosopher and public intellectual. He served as State Minister for Culture of the Federal Republic of Germany under Chancellor Schröder. He was professor of philosophy and political theory at LMU Munich until 2020. Nida-Rümelin is vice chairman of the German Ethics Council.

== Early life and education ==
Nida-Rümelin studied philosophy, physics, mathematics and political sciences. In 1984, he completed his PhD in philosophy at LMU Munich, where he obtained an assistant professorship, first at the Department of Philosophy and later at the Department of Political Sciences. In 1989, he was conferred Habilitation, a German post-doctoral qualification from the Philosophy Department of LMU Munich.

== Career ==
After a one-year visiting professorship at Minnesota State University, he was appointed Chair of the Center for Ethics in the Bio Sciences at Eberhard Karls University of Tübingen. From 1993 to 2003, he held a Chair of Philosophy at the University of Göttingen, and was then appointed Chair of Political Theory and Philosophy at LMU Munich. Since 2009, Nida-Rühmelin is Chair of Philosophy and Political Theory at the Department of Philosophy. He served as Dean of the Philosophy Faculty from 2009 until 2012 and as Deputy Dean after that. From 2011 until 2016, he was Speaker of the Munich Center for Ethics.

Currently, he is speaker of the executive study program Philosophy, Politics, and Ethics (PPE) and member of board of the Parmenides Foundation that supports multi-disciplinary research between the natural sciences and humanities. Nida-Rümelin advises executives and senior managers in ethical questions due to his expertise on risk ethics and philosophy of economics. He is part of the panel Finance and Ethics of the German Association of Financial Analyst and Asset Managers (DFAV e.V.) and the advisory board Intregity and Corporate Responsibility at Daimler AG.

Nida-Rümelin's non-academic articles have been published in German and European newspapers, including Süddeutsche Zeitung, Frankfurter Allgemeine Zeitung, Die Zeit, Le Monde, and La Repubblica. His article, "The Case for a Change of Course in European Policy", co-authored with Peter Bofinger and Jürgen Habermas, was translated and published in 12 languages.

=== Philosophical work ===
Nida-Rümelin propounds an approach to practical philosophy based on his theory of "Structural Rationality". As an alternative to consequentialism, it avoids the dichotomy between moral and extra-moral rationality that is typical in Kantian approaches, and is thus able to integrate a vast complexity of practical reasons that result in coherent practice. Whereas for Kant, rule orientation is constitutive for moral agency, the structural account of rationality extends to the more general idea that rationality consists in embedding situated or point-wise optimization within the broader structure of agency. The intimate connection between morality and rationality that Kant postulates becomes one aspect of the broader, all-encompassing account of acting in such a way that fits into a desirable structure of agency. The practice of giving and taking reasons is understood as aiming at both interpersonal and intrapersonal structural coherence. In this way, the account of structural rationality avoids the dichotomy of reasons – moral versus extra-moral – and allows us to make use of the conceptual frame of decision and game theory in order to clarify some essential aspects of practical coherence. For example, the postulates of the von Neumann/Morgenstern utility theorem are now interpreted as rules of practical coherence and not as axioms of consequentialist optimization. The utility function becomes a mere representation of coherent preferences and expected utility maximization can no longer be interpreted as optimizing the consequences of one's actions. The term “utility” is misleading and should be replaced by “subjective valuation.” The deontological character of structural rationality is compatible with using the conceptual framework of decision theory. This may come as a surprise, but is only due to a logically stringent interpretation of the utility theorem and other theorems of decision and game theory. The usual economic interpretation is only one among many others and in fact, this interpretation is incompatible with most of the practical reasons that we take to be indispensable. The structural account of rationality is embedded in the everyday practice of giving and taking reasons.

Drawing on these considerations, Nida-Rümelin deals with the relationship between philosophy and Lebenswelt (life-world)/ Lebensform (form of life). His position is inspired by Wittgenstein's philosophy. In contrary to Wittgenstein, Nida-Rümelin emphasizes the unity of practice, viz. the unity of the person (the agent) and societal interactions. Individuals strive for coherence regarding their beliefs, epistemic attitudes, actions and emotive attitudes. Taking this as a starting point any incoherences can be criticized and are the impetus for philosophy in general, and for ethical theory more specifically. Philosophical theory has to be careful not to leave the common ground of the human practice of giving and taking reasons. It cannot reinvent reasons; it cannot postulate some principles and deduce moral duties from them. Ethical principles can only be systematizations of a given practice of reasoning. Nida-Rümelin takes the side of pragmatism in its conflict against rationalism.

His theory is characterized as humanism that starts from the conditio humana, i.e. the common elements of the human condition over time and between cultures. Humanism has both an anthropological and an ethical dimension. The anthropological dimension is presented in core normative concepts like (structural) rationality, freedom and responsibility. Humanists think that the ability to act and believe and feel based on reasons is essential in order to understand the human condition. This does not however directly imply humanistic ethics. Human agency requires the ability to weigh reasons and act upon the result of weighing reasons, but it does not ensure morally acceptable agency. Even an officer in a Nazi concentration camp may act by weighing reasons. Humanistic ethics must discriminate between good and bad reasons, good and bad forms of reasoning, good and bad forms of emotive attitudes. Hating somebody because he lives a different life is irrational, as seen in the hatred of homosexuals in a majority heterosexual community, or hatred based on skin colour. The structural account of rationality is optimistic insofar as it assumes that clarifying reasons that strive towardsat intra- and interpersonally coherent agency and belief allow the elimination of bad, misleading reasons of all the three kinds mentioned above (practical, theoretical, and emotive reasons). Therefore, the relationship between anthropological humanism and ethical humanism is not deductive, but pragmatic. Those who take anthropological humanism seriously tend to embrace a humanistic ethos and those who reject humanistic principles of agency tend to fight against anthropological humanism, expressed in different forms: social Darwinism, racism, reductionist naturalism, chauvinist nationalism, discriminating sexism and other forms of anti-humanism. Since communication plays a central role in this form of humanism, Nida-Rümelin presented an account of humanistic semantics.

Nida-Rümelin defends a basic, non-ontological, non-metaphysical realism against instrumentalism in the philosophy of science, positivism, and post-modernism in practical philosophy, the humanities and the social sciences. Realism is not a metaphysical postulate but it is part of our everyday practice of giving and taking reasons (form of life). This practice requires facts that individuals find by developing arguments for and against certain hypotheses. Realism is part of our way of life and this makes it implausible to assume that the sciences and humanities can be understood in an anti-realist manner, as is assumed by instrumentalists, constructivists and post-modernists. It is the continuity between everyday life (form of life) and science that speaks in favor the existence of facts. They are not constituted by beliefs, neither by the beliefs of an individual (solipsism), nor by the beliefs of collectives (cultures) or even ideal discourse communities as seen in the work of Jürgen Habermas, or in Hilary Putnam's so-called internal realism, which is in fact a version of idealism.

Naturalism is the dominant metaphysical attitude in the natural sciences as well as in a good part of the social sciences and even in the humanities, sometimes seen in a combination of post-modernism and naturalism. Nida-Rümelin shows that this implicit or explicit naturalism cannot be maintained. He takes the constituency of human agency as given and tries to show that these constituents are incompatible with naturalism. He contends that there is no plausible naturalistic interpretation of reason, freedom, and responsibility.

Nida-Rümelin first presented his arguments in a trilogy of books: the first about practical reason (2001), the second about freedom (2005), and the third about responsibility (2011). Practical reason, epistemic and practical freedom, epistemic, practical and emotive responsibility are interpreted as three aspects of the same phenomenon: being affected by reasons. This does not mean that the chain of reasoning does not come to an end, he believes. On the contrary, he says, all reasoning ends in the indisputable elements of our shared form of life. It is irrational to doubt everything, or as Wittgenstein claims, there are some things that a sensible human man will not doubt. Reasoning, he contends, is relevant for actions. To doubt it would mean that human beings can transcend their human condition. He believes that, to be reasonable, individuals cannot exclusively depend on factors beyond their control. What individuals think to be right is relevant for what they do, he believes. There cannot be any form of naturalistic determination that excludes reasoning itself, he believes.

Nida-Rümelin takes the argument against the reduction of logic to psychology as an argument in favor of the gradual autonomy of reason. In being able to reason logically, individuals follow logical laws that cannot be identified with psychological or neurophysiological data. Nida-Rümelin embraces insights of Alonzo Church and Kurt Gödel from the 1930s regarding non-computability showing that reasoning cannot be exclusively algorithmic. As a naturalist position, he believes processes are algorithmic and that reasoning cannot be naturalized. Humanism, he believes, excludes deductionist naturalism.

=== Politics ===
Nida-Rümelin spent five years (1998–2002) in politics, first as head of the municipal department of arts and culture in Munich, the capital of Bavaria. He then held a ministerial office as the State Minister for Culture and Media and was a member of the national government of Chancellor Gerhard Schröder. During his time in office, Nida-Rümelin voiced criticism of the Bologna Process, the European reform process of higher education.

In 2014, he criticized German policies aiming to increase the tertiary education rates and recommended instead to further foster the German dual system of vocational training. His book How the rush to universities is leading to a crisis of professional and academic education stimulated a nationwide debate on education policy.

== Publications ==
- 1993 Kritik des Konsequentialismus. Oldenbourg, München (Studienausgabe 1995)
- 1994 mit L. Kern: Logik kollektiver Entscheidungen. Oldenbourg, München
- 1997 Economic Rationality and Practical Reason. Kluwer, Dordrecht
- 1999 Demokratie als Kooperation. Suhrkamp, Frankfurt
- 2000 mit Th. Schmidt: Rationalität in der praktischen Philosophie. Akademie Verlag, Berlin
- 2001 Strukturelle Rationalität. Essay. Reclam, Stuttgart (UB 18150)
- 2002 Ethische Essays. Suhrkamp, Frankfurt
- 2005 Entscheidungstheorie und Ethik / Decision Theory and Ethics. Utz, München
- 2005 Über menschliche Freiheit. Reclam, Stuttgart (UB 18365)
- 2006 Humanismus als Leitkultur., Beck, München
- 2006 Demokratie und Wahrheit. Beck, München
- 2009 Philosophie und Lebensform Suhrkamp, Frankfurt am Main
- 2011 Verantwortung Reclams Universal-Bibliothek, Stuttgart. (UB 18829)
- 2011 Die Optimierungsfalle. Philosophie einer humanen Ökonomie, Irisiana Verlag, München, ISBN 978-3-424-15078-0.
- 2012 Der Sokrates Club. Philosophische Gespräche mit Kindern, Knaus Verlag, München, ISBN 978-3-8135-0464-4.
- 2013 Philosophie einer humanen Bildung. Edition Körber-Stiftung, Hamburg, ISBN 978-3-89684-096-7.
- 2014 Der Akademisierungswahn – Zur Krise beruflicher und akademischer Bildung. Edition Körber-Stiftung, Hamburg, ISBN 978-3-89684-161-2.
- 2015 mit Klaus Zierer: Auf dem Weg in eine neue deutsche Bildungskatastrophe. Herder, Freiburg/Br., ISBN 978-3-451-31288-5.
- 2016 Humanistische Reflexionen (= suhrkamp taschenbuch Wissenschaft 2180), Suhrkamp, Frankfurt am Main, ISBN 978-3-518-29780-3.
- 2017 Über Grenzen denken: Eine Ethik der Migration., Edition Körber-Stiftung, Hamburg, ISBN 978-3-89684-195-7.
- 2018 Unaufgeregter Realismus. mentis, Paderborn, ISBN 978-3-95743-130-1.
- 2018 Digitaler Humanismus., gemeinsam mit Nathalie Weidenfeld, Piper, München, ISBN 978-3-492-05837-7.
- 2020 Die gefährdete Rationalität der Demokratie. Ein politischer Traktat, Edition Körber, Hamburg, ISBN 978-3-89684-278-7.
