= International Journal of Health Services =

- Discipline: Health policy
- Language: English
- Edited by: Joan Benach, Carles Muntaner Bonet

Publication details
- History: 1971-present
- Publisher: SAGE Publications
- Frequency: Quarterly
- Impact factor: 1.750 (2018)

Standard abbreviations
- ISO 4: Int. J. Health Serv.

Indexing
- CODEN: IJUSC3
- ISSN: 0020-7314 (print); 1541-4469 (web)
- LCCN: 71025615
- OCLC no.: 883322960

Links
- Journal homepage; Online access; Online archive

The International Journal of Health Services is a quarterly peer-reviewed academic journal covering health policy. It was established in 1971 and is published by SAGE Publications. The current editors-in-chief are Carles Muntaner (University of Toronto, Canada, The Johns Hopkins University, USA) and Joan Benach (Universitat Pompeu Fabra, Spain, The Johns Hopkins University, USA).

Starting in January 2023, the journal will change its name to the International Journal of Social Determinants of Health and Health Services.

According to the Journal Citation Reports, the International Journal of Health Services has a 2018 impact factor of 1.750, which is one of the highest Impact Factors in the history of the journal. The journal has experienced an IF upward trend since 2015.

A search on this year's (2019) rankings of scientific journals using indicators such as Citescore, SJR (SCImago Journal Rank), and Impact Factor, and sources such as SCImago, Scopus and SSCI, shows the International Journal of Health Services ranking solidly in the 2nd quartile of Health Policy journals. Details and data below:

SCIMAGO's SJR in the Health Policy category

The IJHS ranks in the 2nd quartile (85/242) and has its highest position on record.

Scopus System (Elsevier) Citescore in the Health Policy category

The IJHS has had increasing citations since 2014, with a current citescore of 1.71 (2nd quartile).

SSCI Journals in the Health Policy & Services category

The IJHS ranks in the 2nd quartile.

Web of Science for all scientific Journals

The IJHS ranks in the 2nd quartile of all scientific journals (all categories combined).
