= Alexander Görlach =

German academic and expert on geo-politics (born 1976)

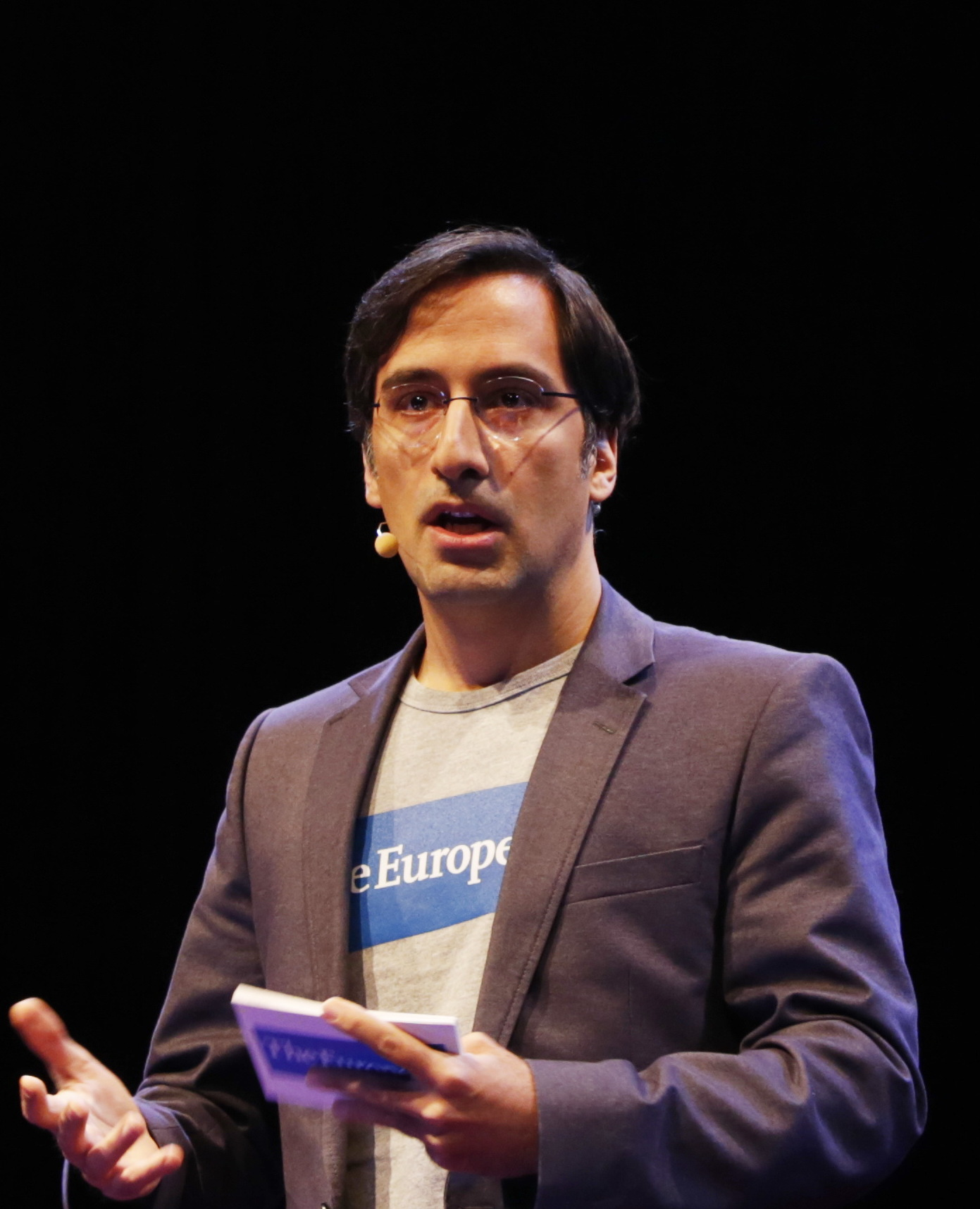
- Görlach, on stage at TEDx Berlin in 2012
- Born: 28 December 1976 (age 49); Ludwigshafen, West Germany
- Occupations: Professor, Columnist, Author, Public speaker
- Writing career
- Genres: Geo-politics, Academia, Journalism, Entrepreneurship
- Subjects: Politics, Democratic theory, Religion, Geo-politics, China, Taiwan
- Website: alexandergoerlach.com

Alexander Görlach is a German academic, author, and columnist. He currently serves as visiting scholar at the philosophy department of New York University and adjunct professor to NYU Gallatin School where he teaches democratic theory. He was previously a senior fellow at the Carnegie Council for Ethics in International Affairs and a visiting scholar at Harvard University.

Görlach is member of the Liberal Party in Germany.

== Early life ==
Görlach was born as the child of a Turkish mother and a German father in Ludwigshafen, Germany. Shortly after being born, he was adopted and raised by a German family.

== Education ==
After graduating from high school in 1996, Görlach received a scholarship from the Konrad-Adenauer-Stiftung and subsequently studied Catholic theology and philosophy at University of Mainz, Pontifical Gregorian University in Rome as well as Al-Azhar University in Cairo and the Faculty of Theology in Ankara. He also studied German studies, Political Science and Musicology at the University of Mainz. He received his ThD in comparative religion from LMU Munich in 2006 and in linguistics, in the field of language and politics, from Johannes Gutenberg University Mainz in 2009.

== Political affiliations ==
Alexander Görlach has been a member of the German Liberal Party (FDP) from September 2016 when, after ten years, he left the German Christian Democratic Party (CDU).

In 2026 Görlach sided with Rome in the automatic excommunication of the Society of Saint Pius X which had morphed, in his words, into a cult (orig. German "Sekte"), "overspiritualizing hardliners".

== Career ==
Görlach has worked for several German media outlets, such as ZDF German Television. He has been and is published in several German media outlets such as Die Welt, Frankfurter Allgemeine Zeitung, Süddeutsche Zeitung, Die Zeit and Focus magazine. From 2007 to 2009 he was executive editor of the online part of Cicero magazine. Today, he is focused on international publications: He is an op-ed contributor to the New York Times, the South China Morning Post, the Taipei Times, the Korea Times, and to The World Post.

He had various positions as visiting scholar and as fellow at Harvard University in the United States, and Cambridge University and Oxford University in the United Kingdom. He is a senior fellow to the Carnegie Council for Ethics in International Affairs in New York and a senior advisor to the Berggruen Institute in Los Angeles. Alexander holds a ThD in comparative religion and a PhD in linguistics. In the academic year 2017-18 he was a visiting scholar at National Taiwan University and City University Hongkong. Since then he focuses on the rise of China and what it means for the democracies in East Asia. Alexander Görlach is an honorary professor of ethics and theology at Leuphana University in Lüneburg, Germany. Alexander Görlach is the founder of the debate-magazine The European, that he also ran as its editor in chief from 2009 to 2015.

Today Görlach serves as an op-ed contributor to the New York Times, Neue Zürcher Zeitung, and the South China Morning Post. He is a columnist to the business magazine Wirtschaftswoche, Deutsche Welle and Focus Online. He is a frequent commentator on German News Channel WeLT TV.

== Publications ==
Homo Empathicus: On Scapegoats, Populists & Saving Democracy (Brookings Press, 2021)
