= Stadtmuseum Bonn =

Museum in Bonn, Germany

Coordinates: 50°44′05″N 7°06′16″E

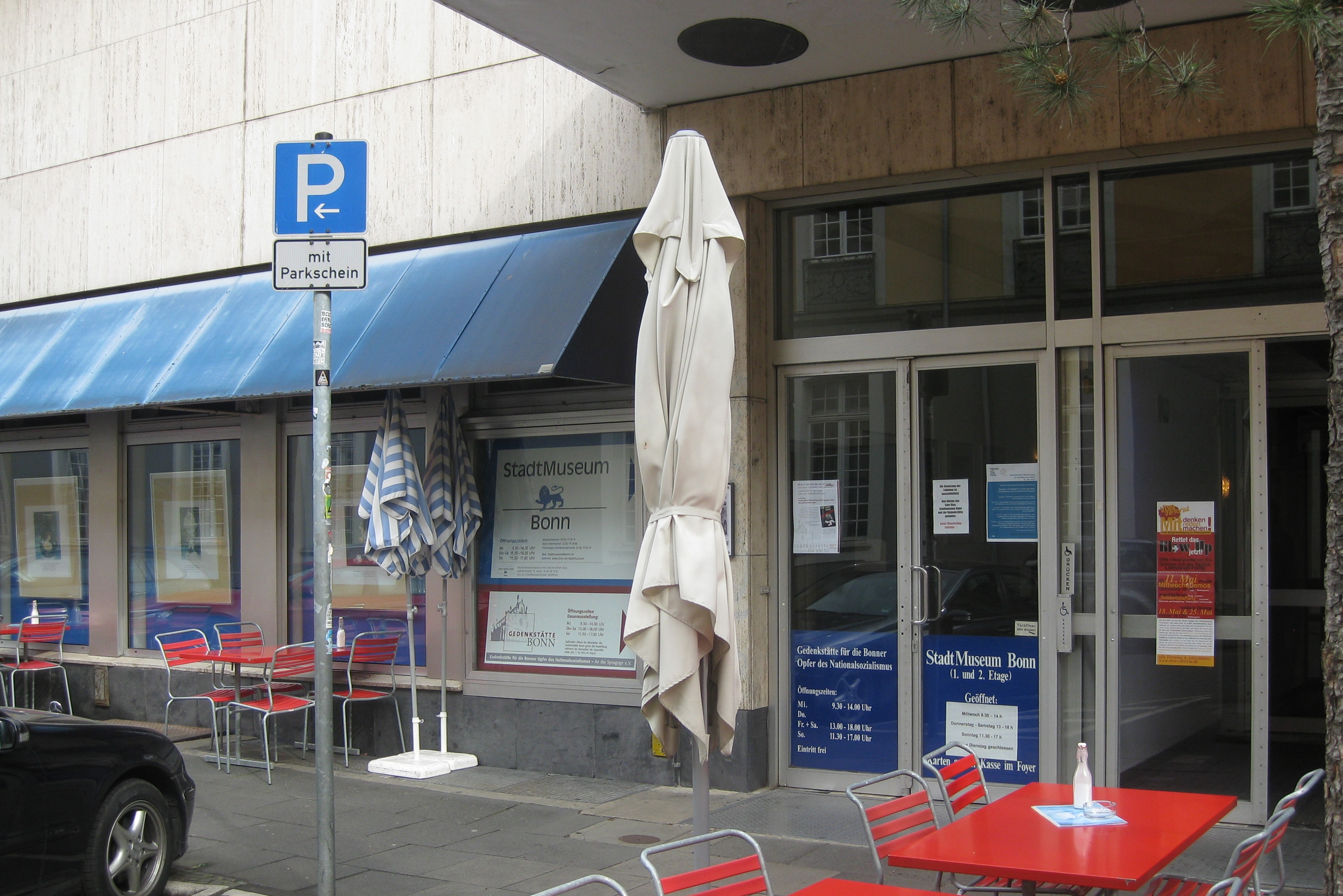
Entrance to the Stadtmuseum Bonn

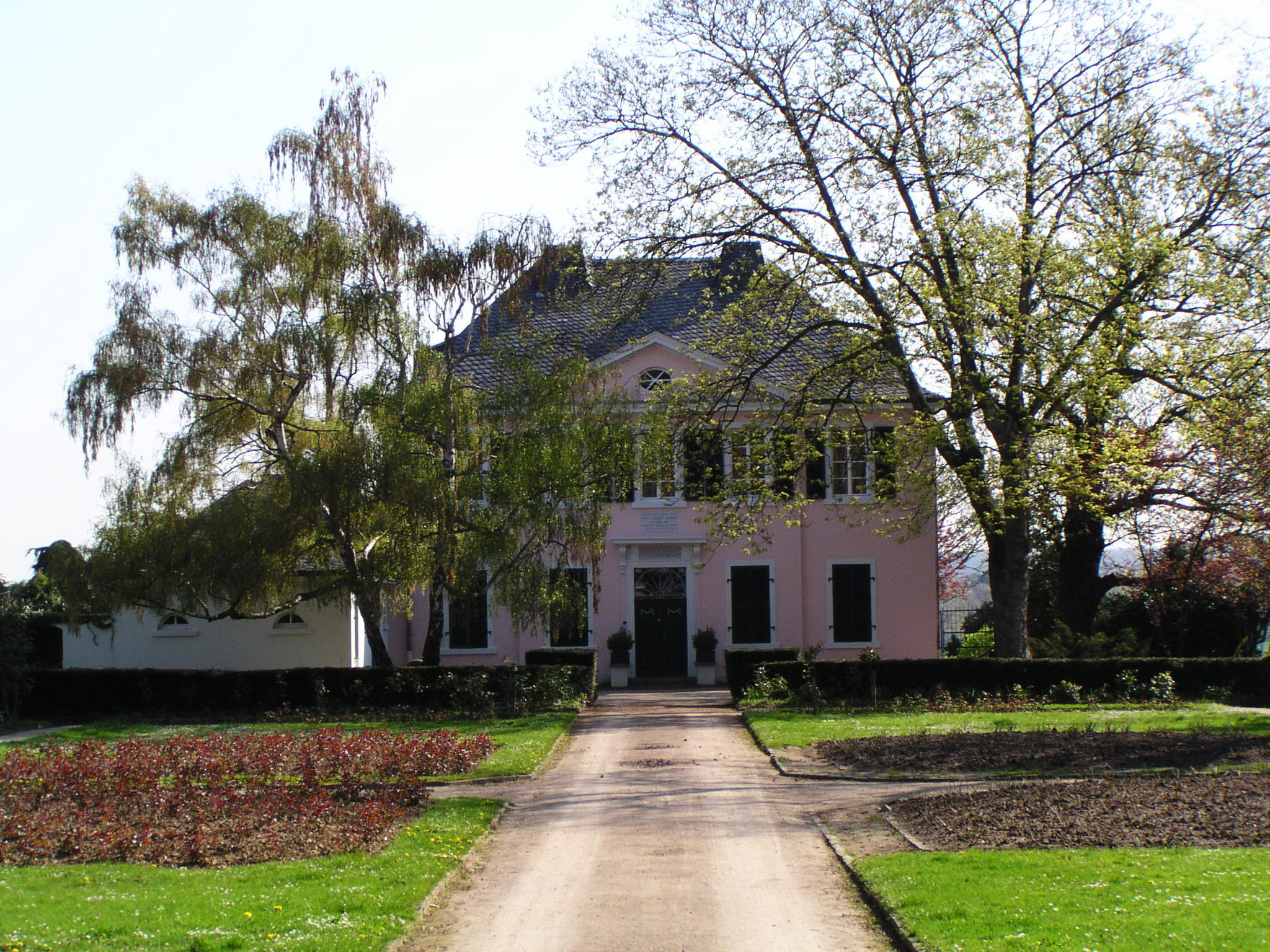
A branch of the Stadtmuseum Bonn: the Ernst-Moritz-Arndt-Haus on Adenauerallee

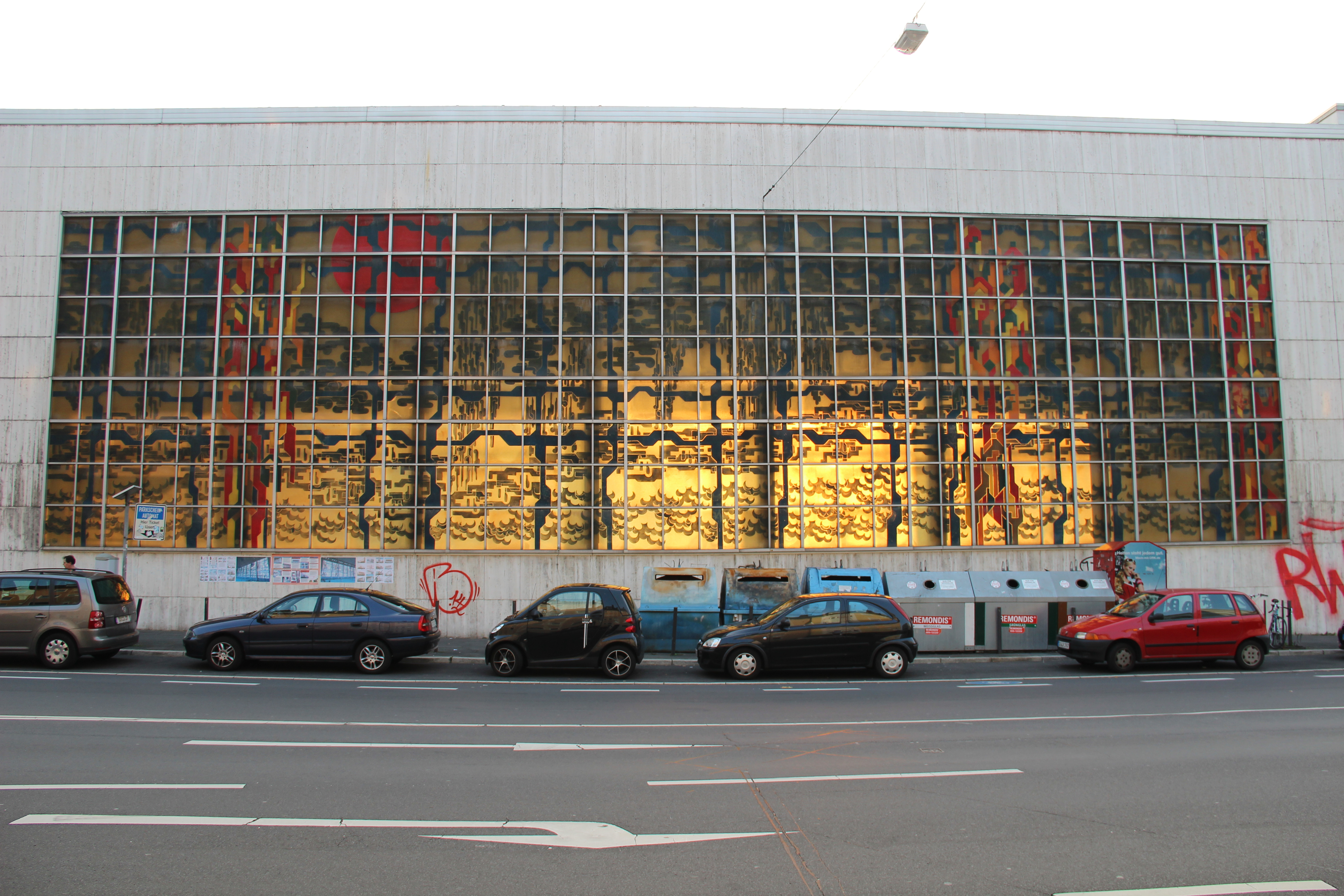
The former swimming pool of the Viktoriabad at Bundesstraße 9 (Belderberg)

Stadtmuseum Bonn (Bonn City Museum) was founded in 1989 and is dedicated to the representation of Bonn's city and cultural history as well as the presentation and maintenance of the extensive collection. The museum rooms are currently located in a building erected in the 1970s at Franziskanerstraße 9, opposite the university building adjacent to Koblenzer Tor in downtown Bonn . The two floors used by the museum previously belonged to the sauna and cleaning wing of the now abandoned Viktoriabad. A further whereabouts in the premises is unclear.

== History ==
In 1886 an association was founded in Bonn with the aim of creating a city history museum. Today's Bonner Heimat- und Geschichtsverein transferred its extensive collection to the city of Bonn in the mid-1950s. As a result, there was close cooperation between the association and the city archive. In the anniversary year 1989 ("2000 years of Bonn"), the city council under Mayor Bärbel Dieckmann decided to found the Stadtmuseum Bonn, although no suitable premises were available at the time. In the early years only the small Ernst-Moritz-Arndt-Haus in the Adenauerallee 79. Small special exhibitions and cultural events take place here. The founding director of the museum was the head of the city archives, Manfred van Rey. The opening of the actual showrooms for the permanent exhibition of the Stadtmuseum Bonn ("From Roman times to today") in the later allocated building on Franziskanerstraße took place on January 14, 1998 on 1000 square meters.
