= Focus (German magazine) =

German weekly news magazine

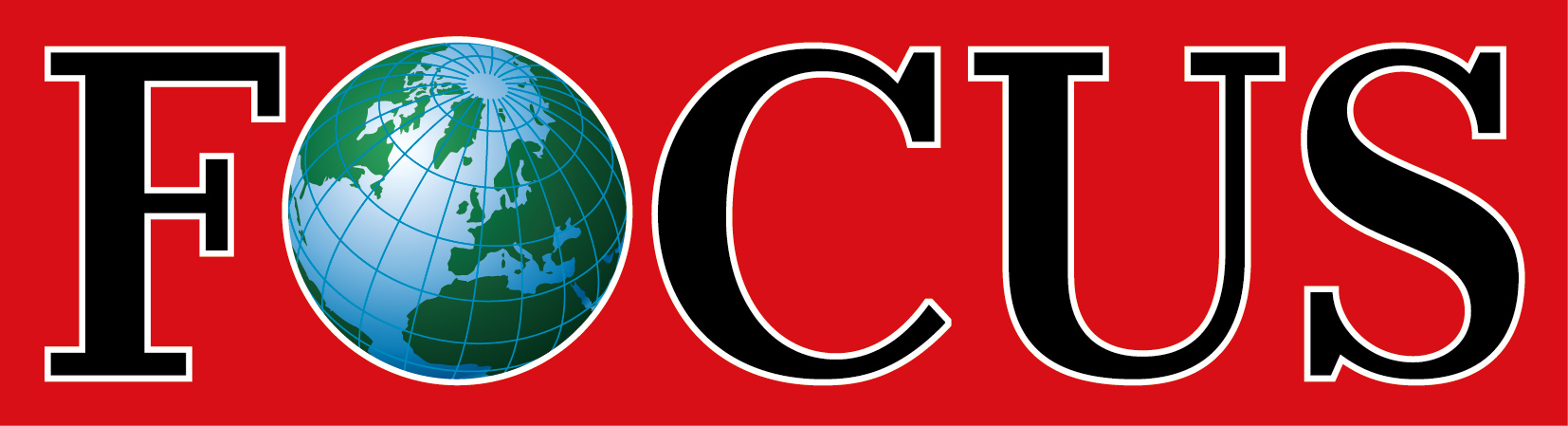
- Editor: Franziska Reich; Georg Meck
- Categories: News magazine
- Frequency: Weekly
- Circulation: 240,330 (01/2024)
- Founder: Helmut Markwort
- First issue: 18 January 1993; 33 years ago
- Company: Hubert Burda Media
- Country: Germany
- Based in: Berlin
- Language: German
- Website: focus.de
- ISSN: 0943-7576

Focus (stylized in all caps) is a German-language news magazine published by Hubert Burda Media. Established in 1993 as an alternative to the Der Spiegel weekly news magazine, its editorial staff has been headquartered in Germany's capital of Berlin since 2015. Alongside Spiegel and Stern, Focus is one of the three most widely circulated German weeklies. The concept originated from Hubert Burda and Helmut Markwort, who went from being editor-in-chief to publisher in 2009 and has been listed in the publication's masthead as founding editor-in-chief since 2017. As of March 2016, the editor-in-chief of Focus was Robert Schneider.

== History ==
Work on Focus commenced in the summer of 1991 under the code name "Zugmieze". In October 1992, Hubert Burda Media announced plans for a new weekly news magazine. Observers initially gave the project only little chance for success. Several attempts of other publishers to establish a competitor to Spiegel and Stern magazines had previously failed. The first edition arrived on the newsstands on 18 January 1993, and was already sold out the next day. The subline of the Focus was "the modern news magazine", and Helmut Markwort became the magazine's first editor-in-chief. The lead story on the alleged comeback of Hans-Dietrich Genscher as the successor of Richard von Weizsäcker in the office of the Federal President was later proven to be a canard. There was an equal mix of positive and negative reviews: whereas journalists tended to take a critical view towards Focus, advertisers had consistently favorable responses. Observers saw in Focus above all a challenger of Spiegel, whereas the publisher viewed American magazines such as Newsweek and Time as its role model.

After five issues, Focus had some 15,000 subscribers, and with circulation of over 300,000 copies sold, it was a commercial success from the beginning. The magazine played a decisive role in the expansion of Hubert Burda Media's market position. In mid-1994, a Dutch court ruled that due to brand disputes, Focus was no longer allowed to be sold in Belgium, the Netherlands, and Luxembourg. Unfazed by this, Focus continued its growth strategy, later even occasionally eclipsing Spiegel in advertising sales. Burda further enhanced its international profile, for example, through a cooperation agreement with American media group Ziff Davis. 1996 saw the launch of the Internet portal Focus Online, and the group entered into production of television content under the name of Focus TV. Focus developed into one of the leading German news magazines. In 1997, Hubert Burda was lauded for the magazine's "creative and groundbreaking innovations", among other accolades.

Over the first five years of its existence, Focus repeatedly created a sensation with its interviews of key celebrities, e.g. in 1996 with real estate mogul Jürgen Schneider after his arrest, or in 1997 with Leo Kirch in the aftermath of his media group's collapse. The Focus concept was also successfully adapted outside of Europe, e.g. in the form of Época magazine by the Brazilian media house Grupo Globo. At the beginning of 1999, Focus achieved higher readership than Spiegel for the first time, and managed to further expand its lead position in the years to follow. 2000 saw the launch of Focus Money, an off-shoot of the news magazine dedicated to business and financial topics. In 2001, a division for Internet topics was created at Focus, in addition to pooling Internet activities of Focus Digital in the joint venture Tomorrow Focus. Thus, the Focus magazine publishing company was once again primarily responsible for printed publications, yet participated in Tomorrow Focus.

In 2004, the first personnel changes occurred at Focus: In addition to his duties as editor-in-chief, Helmut Markwort also assumed the position of publisher, and Uli Baur was promoted from deputy editor-in-chief to editor-in-chief. In 2005, under the new leadership, Focus teamed up with audio publisher Hörverlag to create the download portal Claudio for audio books. In 2006, Focus became embroiled in the journalist scandal of the Bundesnachrichtendienst, the German Intelligence Services. In exchange for money and benefits in kind, several journalists had offered the intelligence agency to collect and disclose information on investigative journalists and their sources. The German Intelligence Services in turn put Focus journalists under observation as informants. Irrespective of the public debate surrounding the affair, Focus continued its development, yet like all news magazines, was grappling with declining circulation. At the end of 2009, it was announced that Helmut Markwort was stepping down as editor-in-chief. Wolfram Weimer, founder of the political magazine Cicero, was appointed as his successor. Observers saw in Markwort's departure a fundamental "change in direction". Even prior to Weimer's taking up his duties, the publisher staged a relaunch of Focus.

After only a year, Weimer left Focus and his position was left unfilled, which led to Baur becoming the sole editor-in-chief. According to media reports, publisher Markwort and Baur had "rejected" the new direction of Focus and "ultimately obstructed it more and more heavily". Weimer was said to have wanted to position the magazine as "more up-market and more political". The paid circulation of single copies "more and more heavily" declined under Weimer's and Baur's leadership, dropping below the 100,000 mark. In 2013, Jörg Quoos took over as editor-in-chief of the magazine, and Baur became publisher. Quoos gave Focus a more political orientation and, in particular, reduced the share of practical tips. For example, the magazine ran an exposé on soccer manager Uli Hoeneß's voluntary disclosure of his tax evasion, and landed the scoop on the so-called "Nazi-era treasure trove" of art collector Cornelius Gurlitt. In 2014, Ulrich Reitz followed as new editor-in-chief, as the publisher and Quoos had differences in opinion on the future direction of the magazine. Among other steps, Reitz completed the process initiated under Quoos, relocating Focus from Munich to Berlin in 2015. Only a small editorial staff remained in the Bavarian state capital. In 2016, there was again a change at the head of the editorial staff: Robert Schneider, formerly editor-in-chief of Superillu, replaced Reitz, who remained until the end of the year, responsible for the topics of politics and debate.

In 2017, Focus announced the closure of its offices in Munich and Düsseldorf, along with reorganizations in the editorial staff. Since then, the magazine is now created completely in Berlin. Later in the year, Hubert Burda Media launched a broad-based reader campaign entitled "Menschen im Focus" (people in focus).

== Circulation ==
Focus is one of the most widely circulated news magazines, and has a proportionally large share in the advertising market. However, the magazine, as with Spiegel and Stern, has sustained significant declines over the past years, dropping from 782,685 to 438,055 sold copies from the fourth quarter of 1998 to the second quarter of 2017. Individual sales experience relatively wide fluctuation, depending upon the cover story. The share of subscriptions in the paid circulation is currently roughly 37%, recently increasing slightly.

== Profile ==
While Focus positioned itself as a news magazine alongside Spiegel, the latter in turn decidedly distanced itself from Focus, dismissively referring to it as the "Munich Illustrated", among other things. Both publications differ in their editorial approaches: Spiegel puts an emphasis on complex political, economic and social analysis, whereas Focus, in addition to political reporting, also caters to topics of everyday relevance from the realms of family, health, finances and career. However, Spiegel published more articles featuring practical tips, modeled after Focus. With comparatively shorter texts, more graphics, more impactful visuals and ranking lists, readers are offered information that is easier to absorb. From the beginning, journalism offering practical tips has been an essential element of Focus. According to the news magazine's own statements, its target group includes people who "are involved in society, in politics and in their professions, thanks to their active processing of information and especially due to their strong appetite for information". When the magazine launched, observers referred to this group as "info elites". Focus is generally considered to have a bourgeois (i.e. conservative, liberal, non-socialist) political orientation.

== Criticism ==
Major controversy erupted over a Focus story on a mission involving Germany's elite counter-terror unit, GSG 9, in the village of Bad Kleinen, leading to staff offices being searched in January 1994. Law enforcement authorities investigated the magazine because confidential sources had been quoted, e.g. an assessment report from the Federal Criminal Police Office, the Bundeskriminalamt, and the pocket agenda of the slain RAF terrorist Wolfgang Grams. According to information by Stern, documents found in Focus offices provided the decisive clue to identifying the informant.

In 1995, Focus reported on business difficulties involving the Hamburg private bank Mody. As a result, it experienced a bank run by many depositors, and a day after the magazine article appeared, the bank had to close its doors until further notice. The shareholders subsequently held Focus directly responsible for the illiquidity. The Press Tribunal of the Hamburg District Court concurred, ordering Focus to pay restitution for damages. In appeal proceedings, this decision was reversed by Hamburg's Higher Regional Court, and Germany's Federal Court of Justice denied the plaintiff's appeal on points of law. Focus welcomed the end of the legal disputes as a "victory for freedom of the press".

A 2014 TU Dresden study involved research on the synchronization of news and advertising. Researchers found that, both in Spiegel and Focus, reporting on companies was more frequent, friendlier and more frequently mentioned products, the more the companies purchased advertising.

Focus's reporting on the 2015–16 New Year's Eve sexual assaults in Germany created controversy. The cover page showed hand prints in black paint on a white, naked woman; it was criticized as a "naked insult" and considered "racist". Unlike the daily newspaper Süddeutsche Zeitung, which had also caused an uproar with a polarizing depiction, Focus refused to apologise and justified the cover as a symbolic depiction of "what happened in Cologne". The German Press Council received several complaints about Focus, but rejected all of them.
