= The European (2009 magazine) =

The European Magazine
- Website type: Magazine
- Available in: German, English
- Headquarters: Germany
- Owner: WEIMER MEDIA GROUP GmbH
- Creator: Alexander Görlach
- Editor: Ansgar Graw
- Website: theeuropean-magazine.com
- Commercial: Yes
- Current status: Active

The European is a German magazine published in Berlin, Germany. The magazine's name does not describe a thematic of geographic focus but alludes to the discursive tradition of European culture and politics. It was first published in September 2009 and features opinion articles, regular columns and interviews. A quarterly print edition was launched in September 2012.

== History and profile ==
The European was first published in September 2009. Its publisher and editor-in-chief was Alexander Görlach, former editor-in-chief of Cicero Online, who previously worked for both ZDF and Frankfurter Allgemeine Zeitung. The magazine's office was located in Berlin, Germany.

The European features opinion articles, regular columns and interviews. Its claim is "Views, not News". According to its mission statement, "The European is an opinion magazine". Its authors "debate important political and cultural issues within the framework of journalistic news analysis."

Opinion articles are grouped into thematically focused debates and are contributed by outside "experts" from academia, media, politics, business, science, and culture. Prominent contributors include José Manuel Barroso, Fareed Zakaria, Nicholas Siegel, Martti Ahtisaari, Gareth Evans, Joseph Stiglitz, and Steven Pinker. According to Görlach, The European does not have a specific political leaning but strives to bring differing opinions into dialogue with each other. The German version of the magazine also features a growing circle of regular columnists who write about topics that range from domestic politics to gender issues, European economics, digital culture, and the media.

With the 2015 takeover by the Weimer Media Group GmbH, Görlach quit and The European changed its political course. 2025 Ansgar Graw becomes editorial director and Publisher of the magazine.

The magazine is financed through advertising, event organizing and through the work of a separate consulting business, which aims to aid companies and organizations with their social media and outreach strategies. Political parties, publishing houses, religious organizations, unions or interest groups have no investment in The European.

== The European in English ==
In October 2010, The European launched an English version of the magazine that is aimed at an international audience. It features debates on geopolitical issues, European "voices", and regular interviews about politics, science, and culture. The European maintains a network of international media partners that includes The Huffington Post (United States), Mediapart (France), Der Standard (Austria), Linkiesta (Italy) and several German publications.

== Print ==
In June 2012, Görlach announced the inaugural print edition of The European. The first issue was published in September 2012 (circulation 50,000). The print magazine follows a quarterly schedule and focuses on "big issues" beyond the daily news cycle. It is available on newsstands in Germany, Austria, and Switzerland.

== See also ==
- List of magazines in Germany
