= Federal Government Commissioner for Culture and the Media =

German political office

- Beauftragter der Bundesregierung für Kultur und Medien, BKM

Agency overview
- Formed: 1998
- Jurisdiction: Government of Germany
- Headquarters: Berlin
- Employees: 400 (2021)
- Annual budget: €2.14 billion (2021)
- Agency executive: Wolfram Weimer
- Website: www.kulturstaatsministerin.de

The Federal Government Commissioner for Culture and the Media (German: Beauftragter der Bundesregierung für Kultur und Medien, BKM), also known as the Minister of State for Culture (German: Kulturstaatsminister), is responsible for cultural and media policy in the Federal Republic of Germany, accompanied and monitored by the Committee for Culture and the Media in the German Bundestag. Since cultural policy in Germany falls under the jurisdiction of the states of Germany, there is no Ministry of Culture at the federal level in Germany.

In 2018, around 260 employees worked for the Commissioner in Bonn and Berlin on issues relating to culture and media; the budget amounted to €1.67 billions. In December 2021, there were already around 400 employees and €2.14 billion for culture and media in the federal budget. The Minister of State for Culture is not a federal minister, but a parliamentary state secretary who, because the office belonged to the Chancellor's Office from 1998 to 2013, bears the title of Minister of State (Staatsminister). As such, he has no voting rights in the Federal Cabinet.

== Activities ==
The primary tasks include continuously developing and improving the legal framework for the cultural and media sectors through federal legislation, promoting cultural institutions and projects of national importance, ensuring the cultural representation of the federal government in the federal capital Berlin, representing Germany's cultural and media policy interests in various international bodies, promoting nationally significant memorial sites commemorating the victims of Nazi Germany, and working with memorial sites and institutions to remember the injustices committed in the former GDR. Its responsibilities also include film promotion, the protection of cultural heritage, and leading the federal government's media policy (e.g., financing the international broadcaster Deutsche Welle).

The staff of the Federal Government Commissioner for Culture and the Media is responsible for a number of organizations and institutions, including the German Federal Archives, the German National Library the Federal Foundation for the Reappraisal of the SED Dictatorship, the Holocaust Memorial and other national memorial sites. Until the dissolution of the Federal Commissioner for the Records of the State Security Service of the former German Democratic Republic (BStU), this federal authority was part of the BKM's remit.

The authority is also responsible for awarding numerous prizes and scholarships, such as the Pour le Mérite, the German Film Prize, the German Screenplay Prize, the Innovation Prize, and the foreign scholarship at the Villa Massimo in Rome or at the German Study Center in Venice.

== History ==
The office was created in 1998 by Chancellor Gerhard Schröder and was intended to consolidate activities that had previously been spread across various ministries. Michael Naumann became the first Minister of State for Culture in February 1999.

== Office holders ==
No.	Name	Time in office	Party
1	Michael Naumann	1999–2000	SPD
2	Julian Nida-Rümelin	2001–2002	SPD
3	Christina Weiss	2002–2005	independent
4	Bernd Neumann	2005–2013	CDU
5	Monika Grütters	2013–2021	CDU
6	Claudia Roth	2021–2025	Greens
7	Wolfram Weimer	2025–	independent
