= Helmut Markwort =

German journalist

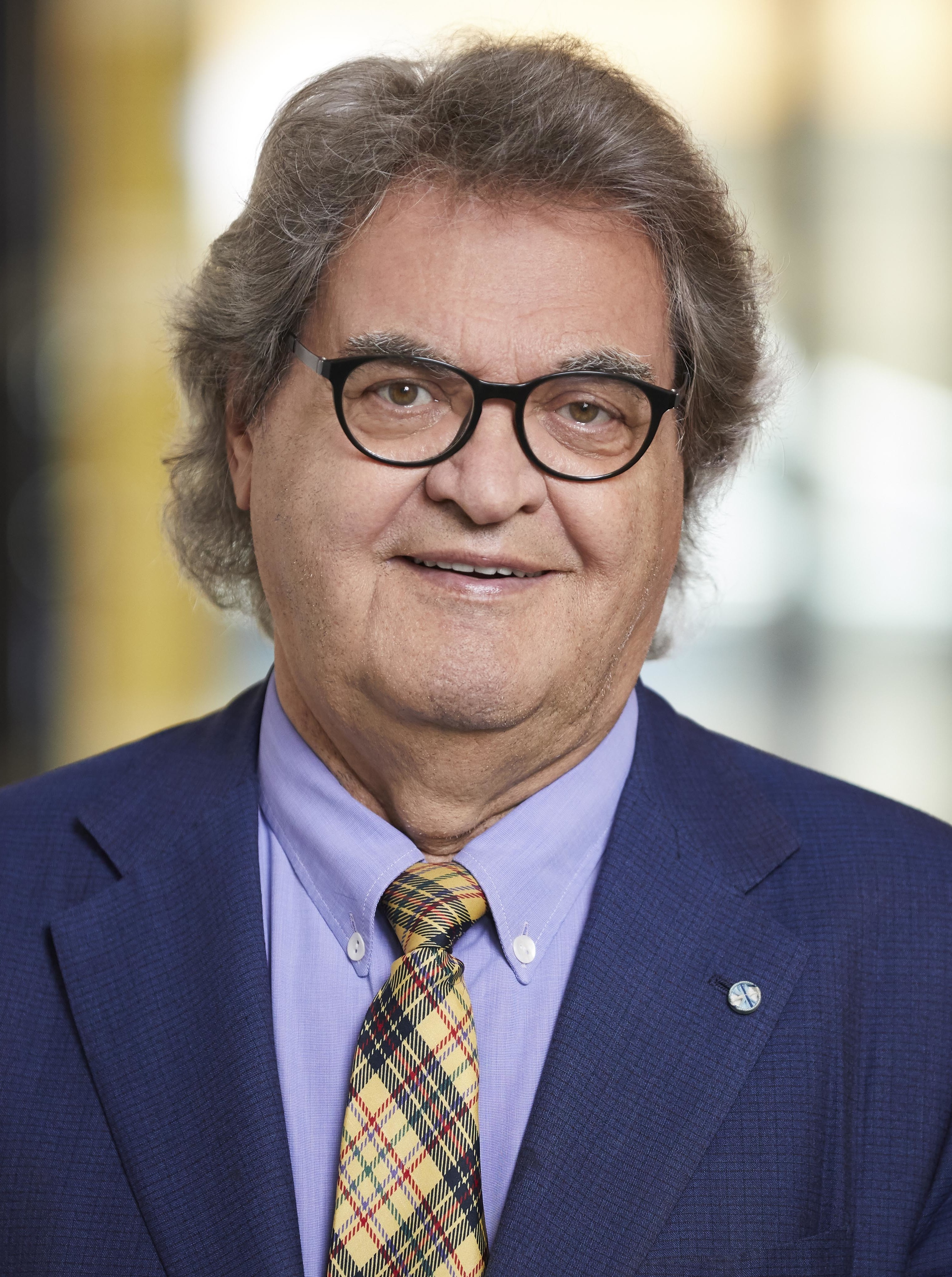
Markwort in 2019

Helmut Markwort (born 8 December 1936 in Darmstadt) is a German journalist and former editor-in-chief of the German weekly news magazine Focus from 1993 to 2010. He is a member of the Landtag of Bavaria (state parliament) for the liberal Free Democratic Party of Germany.

Markwort was nominated by his party as delegate to the Federal Convention for the purpose of electing the President of Germany in 2022.
