= Merkel cabinet =

Merkel cabinet is the name of any of four cabinets in the Federal Republic of Germany led by Angela Merkel:

- First Merkel cabinet (2005–2009)
- Second Merkel cabinet (2009–2013)
- Third Merkel cabinet (2013–2018)
- Fourth Merkel cabinet (2018–2021)
