= Innovationspreis des Beauftragten für Kultur und Medien =

The Innovationspreis des Beauftragten für Kultur und Medien (Innovation in Culture and Media Prize) was a German government media award which granted prizes of 15 to 25,000 Euros yearly from 2002 to 2010 to individuals or institutions in the film industry that demonstrated innovation.

== Past winners ==
Year	Winner	Project	Prize
2002	Internationale Media Research Agency GmbH, Leipzig	Satellite Aided Trend Analysis (SATA)	15,000 €
2002	Director's Friend GmbH, Köln		15,000 €
2002	Niels Beer und Stefan Ostertag GbR, Dresden, and the Institut für Kino und Filmkultur, Köln	School cinema - School film week	15,000 €
2003	Salzgeber & Co Medien GmbH	European Docu Zone	15,000 €
2003	Crew united, Lutz und Zenglein GbR	Internetproject: www.crew-united.com	15,000 €
2004	Deutsche Hörfilm GmbH, Berlin, and Titelbild GmbH, Berlin		15,000 €
2004	Freunde der Deutschen Kinemathek	Arsenal Experimental	15,000 €
2004	Kinomatik, Wurster, Killenberger & Ratsch GbR	MOVIEtube System	25,000 €
2005	Kurzfilmagentur Hamburg e. V.		25,000 €
2006	Film Academy Baden-Wuerttemberg, Institut für Animation, Visual Effects und digitale Postproduktion	Artificial actors	25,000 €
2006	Tina Thiele, Köln	Internetproject: www.casting-network.de	25,000 €
2006	University of Leipzig, Institut für Kommunikations- und Medienwissenschaft		25,000 €
2007	Michael Hentschel		25,000 €
2007	EYZ Media		25,000 €
